= Field hockey at the 1980 Summer Olympics – Men's team squads =

List of hockey players

The following is the list of squads that took place in the men's field hockey tournament at the 1980 Summer Olympics.

== Cuba ==
The following players represented Cuba:

- Angel Mora
- Severo Frometa
- Bernabé Izquierdo
- Edgardo Vázquez
- Héctor Pedroso
- Tomás Varela
- Raúl García
- Jorge Mico
- Rodolfo Delgado
- Lazaro Hernández
- Juan Blanco
- Juan Caballero
- Roberto Ramírez
- Ángel Fontane
- Ricardo Campos
- Juan Ríos

== India ==
The following players represented India:

- Allan Schofield
- Bir Bahadur Chettri
- Dung Dung Sylvanus
- Rajinder Singh
- Devinder Singh
- Gurmail Singh
- Ravinder Pal Singh
- Vasudevan Bhaskaran
- Somaya Muttana Maneypandey
- Maharaj Krishon Kaushik
- Charanjit Kumar
- Merwyn Fernandis
- Amarjit Rana
- Mohammed Shahid
- Zafar Iqbal
- Surinder Singh Sodhi

== Poland ==
The following players represented Poland:

- Zygfryd Józefiak
- Andrzej Mikina
- Krystian Bąk
- Włodzimierz Stanisławski
- Leszek Hensler
- Jan Sitek
- Jerzy Wybieralski
- Leszek Tórz
- Zbigniew Rachwalski
- Henryk Horwat
- Andrzej Myśliwiec
- Leszek Andrzejczak
- Jan Mielniczak
- Mariusz Kubiak
- Adam Dolatowski
- Krzysztof Głodowski

== Spain ==
The following players represented Spain:

- José Miguel García
- Juan Amat
- Santiago Malgosa
- Rafael Garralda
- Francisco Fábregas
- Juan Luís Coghen
- Ricardo Cabot
- Jaime Arbós
- Carlos Roca
- Juan Pellón
- Miguel de Paz
- Miguel Chaves
- Juan Arbós
- Javier Cabot
- Paulino Monsalve
- Jaime Zumalacárregui

== Soviet Union ==
The following players represented Soviet Union:

- Vladimir Pleshakov
- Vyacheslav Lampeyev
- Leonid Pavlovsky
- Sos Hayrapetyan
- Farit Zigangirov
- Valery Belyakov
- Sergey Klevtsov
- Oleg Zagorodnev
- Aleksandr Gusev
- Sergey Pleshakov
- Mikhail Nichepurenko
- Minneula Azizov
- Aleksandr Sychov
- Aleksandr Myasnikov
- Viktor Deputatov
- Aleksandr Goncharov

== Tanzania ==
The following players represented Tanzania:

- Leopold Gracias
- Benedict Mendes
- Soter Da Silva
- Abraham Sykes
- Youssef Manwar
- Jaypal Singh
- Mohamed Manji
- Rajabu Rajab
- Jasbir Virdee
- Islam Islam
- Stephen Da Silva
- Frederick Furtado
- Taher Ali Hassan Ali
- Anoop Mukundan
- Patrick Toto
- Julius Peter
