= India at the 1980 Summer Olympics =

- IOC code: IND
- NOC: Indian Olympic Association

in Moscow
- Competitors: 76 (58 men, 18 women) in 8 sports
- Medals Ranked 23rd: Gold 1 Silver 0 Bronze 0 Total 1

Summer Olympics appearances (overview)
- 1900; 1904–1912; 1920; 1924; 1928; 1932; 1936; 1948; 1952; 1956; 1960; 1964; 1968; 1972; 1976; 1980; 1984; 1988; 1992; 1996; 2000; 2004; 2008; 2012; 2016; 2020; 2024

India competed at the 1980 Summer Olympics in Moscow, USSR.

== Competitors ==
Sports	Men	Women	Total	Events
Athletics	9	2	11	12
Basketball	12	0	12	1
Boxing	3	0	3	3
Equestrian	4	0	4	1
Field hockey	16	16	32	2
Shooting	4	0	4	2
Weightlifting	2	0	2	2
Wrestling	6	0	6	6
Total	56	18	74	29

== Medalists ==
=== Field Hockey ===
- Vasudevan Baskaran (captain), Allan Schofield, Bir Bhadur Chettri, Sylvanus Dung Dung, Davinder Singh, Gurmail Singh, Ravinder Pal Singh, Sommayya Maneypande, Maharaj Krishan Kaushik, Charanjit Kumar, Merwyn Fernandes, Amarjit Singh Rana, Mohamed Shahid, Zafar Iqbal, and Surinder Singh Sodhi — Field Hockey, Men's Team Competition.

== Results by event ==
=== Athletics ===
Men's 200 metres

- Subramanian Perumal

- Heat — 22.39 (→ did not advance)

Men's 800 metres

- Sriram Singh

- Heat — 1:49.8
- Semifinals — 1:49.0 (→ did not advance)

Men's 1,500 metres

- Sant Kumar

- Heat — 3:55.6 (→ did not advance)

Men's 10,000 metres

- Hari Chand

- Heat — 29:45.8 (→ did not advance)

Men's Marathon

- Hari Chand

- Final — 2:22:08 (→ 31st place)

- Shivnath Singh

- Final — did not finish (→ no ranking)

Men's Shot Put

- Bahadur Singh Chauhan

- Qualification — 17.05 m (→ did not advance, 15th place)

Men's 20 km Walk

- Ranjit Singh

- Final — 1:38:27.2 (→ 18th place)

Women's 100 metres

- P. T. Usha

- Heat — 12.27 (→ did not advance)

Women's 800 metres

- Geeta Zutshi

- Heat — 2:06.6 (→ did not advance)

Women's 1,500 metres

- Geeta Zutshi

- Heat — did not start (→ did not advance)

=== Basketball ===
- Team Roster:

- Parvez Irani Diniar
- Chopra Ajmer Singh
- Tarlok Sandhu Singh
- Paramdip Singh
- Shyam Radhey
- Baldev Singh
- Dilip Gurumurthy
- Paramjit Singh
- Nagarajan Amarnath
- Jorawar Singh
- Rathore Uman Singh
- Harbhajan Singh

==== Group A ====
Pos	Team	Pld	W	L	PF	PA	PD	Pts	Qualification
1	Soviet Union (H)	3	3	0	321	235	+86	6	Semi-final round
2	Brazil	3	2	1	297	235	+62	5	Semi-final round
3	Czechoslovakia	3	1	2	285	236	+49	4	Classification round
4	India	3	0	3	194	391	−197	3	Classification round

Source: FIBA
Rules for classification: 1) points; 2) head-to-head points; 3) head-to-head goal average; 4) head-to-head number of points scored.
(H) Hosts

20 July 1980
20:15

Boxscore

India	65–121	Soviet Union
Scoring by half: 38–60, 27–61
Pts: A. Singh 22; Rebs: A. Singh 5 Asts: Han. Singh 3		Pts: Deryugin, Salnikov 17; Rebs: Deryugin 10; Asts: Yeryomin 5

Olympiiski, Moscow

21 July 1980
13:00

Boxscore

Czechoslovakia	133–65	India
Scoring by half: 63–36, 70–29
Pts: Brabenec 28; Rebs: Douša, Kropilák 6 Asts: Pospíšil 8		Pts: A. Singh 35; Rebs: five players 2 Asts: Han. Singh 10

Olympiiski, Moscow

23 July 1980
11:00

Boxscore

Brazil	137–64	India
Scoring by half: 65–28, 72–36
Pts: Schmidt 26; Rebs: Schmidt 13; Asts: Setrini 5		Pts: Shyam 32; Rebs: A. Singh 5 Asts: Han. Singh 4

Olympiiski, Moscow

=== Classification round ===
Results between Poland vs. Senegal, Australia vs. Sweden and Czechoslovakia vs. India were carried over from the preliminary round.

Pos	Team	Pld	W	L	PF	PA	PD	Pts
7	Poland	5	4	1	453	359	+94	9
8	(International Olympic Committee) Australia	5	4	1	417	381	+36	9
9	Czechoslovakia	5	3	2	474	377	+97	8
10	Sweden	5	3	2	375	341	+34	8
11	Senegal	5	1	4	345	396	−51	6
12	India	5	0	5	329	539	−210	5

Source: FIBA
Rules for classification: 1) points; 2) head-to-head points; 3) head-to-head goal average; 4) head-to-head number of points scored.

25 July 1980
11:00

Boxscore

Poland	113–67	India
Scoring by half: 63–33, 50–34

CSKA Sports Palace, Moscow

26 July 1980
11:00

Boxscore

Senegal	81–59	India
Scoring by half: 37–31, 44–28

CSKA Sports Palace, Moscow

27 July 1980
11:00

Boxscore

Sweden	119–63	India
Scoring by half: 52–29, 67–34

CSKA Sports Palace, Moscow

28 July 1980
11:00

Boxscore

India	75–93	(International Olympic Committee) Australia
Scoring by half: 41–37, 34–56

CSKA Sports Palace, Moscow

=== Boxing ===
Men's Light Flyweight (48 kg)

- Thapa Birender Singh
  1. First Round — Lost to Dietmar Geilich (East Germany) on points (2-3)

Men's Flyweight (51 kg)

- Amala Dass
  1. First Round — Lost to Yo Ryon-Sik (North Korea) on points (0-5)

Men's Bantamweight (54 kg)

- Ganapathy Manoharan
  1. First Round — Bye
  2. Second Round — Defeated Samba Jacob Diallo (Guinea) on points (4-1)
  3. Third Round — Lost to Geraldi Issaick (Tanzania) after referee stopped contest in second round

=== Field hockey ===
==== Men's team competition ====
The original plan was for a twelve-team tournament, divided into two round-robin groups of six, with the top two of each qualifying for the semi-finals.

However, nine of the twelve teams withdrew as part of the U.S.-led boycott in response to the Soviet invasion of Afghanistan.

Argentina, Kenya, Pakistan, Malaysia, and West Germany boycotted completely, and while Australia, Great Britain, the Netherlands, and New Zealand competed in some sports, their hockey governing bodies pulled out.

The organising committee subsequently reduced the competition to six teams, the minimum required to hold a competition, with Cuba and Tanzania representing the Americas and Africa in place of Argentina and Kenya respectively, while Poland were invited as the next best team from the 1978 World Cup.

Team Roster

- Allan Schofield
- Bir Bahadur Chettri
- Dung Dung Sylvanus
- Rajinder Singh
- Devinder Singh
- Gurmail Singh
- Ravinder Pal Singh
- Vasudevan Bhaskaran
- Somaya Muttana Maneypandey
- Maharaj Krishon Kaushik
- Charanjit Kumar
- Merwyn Fernandis
- Amarjit Rana
- Mohammed Shahid
- Zafar Iqbal
- Surinder Singh Sodhi

=== Preliminary ===
Pos	Team	Pld	W	D	L	GF	GA	GD	Pts	Qualification
1	Spain	5	4	1	0	33	3	+30	9	Gold-medal match
2	India	5	3	2	0	39	6	+33	8	Gold-medal match
3	Soviet Union	5	3	0	2	30	11	+19	6	Bronze-medal match
4	Poland	5	2	1	2	19	15	+4	5	Bronze-medal match
5	Cuba	5	1	0	4	7	42	−35	2	
6	Tanzania	5	0	0	5	3	54	−51	0	

Source: FIH

20 July 1980
12:45

India	18–0	Tanzania
Deavinder 4', 21', 25', 27'; Baskaran 15', 29', 57', 63'; Shahid 17'; Surinder 23', 30', 31', 34', 58'; Fernandes 27'; Iqbal 52', 55'; Kaushik 61'	Report

Minor Arena, Dynamo Stadium

21 July 1980
17:00

India	2–2	Poland
Deavinder 31'; Fernandes 69'	Report	Stanislawski 39'; Wybieralski 65'

Minor Arena, Dynamo Stadium

23 July 1980
12:45

Spain	2–2	India
Amat 21'; Cabot 43'	Report	Surinder 15', 65'

Minor Arena, Dynamo Stadium

24 July 1980
11:00

India	13–0	Cuba
Surinder 3', 11', 43', 64'; Shahid 8', 40'; Rajinder 12', 19'; Amarjit 18', 35'; Baskaran 22'; Deavinder 30', 63'	Report

Minor Arena, Dynamo Stadium

26 July 1980
12:45

Soviet Union	2–4	India
Gusev 36'; Zigangirov 66'	Report	Deavinder 3'; Surinder 34'; Shahid 41'; Kaushik 64'

Minor Arena, Dynamo Stadium

==== Gold-medal match ====
29 July 1980
17:00

India	4–3	Spain
S. Singh 24', 30'; Kaushik 42'; Shahid 58'	Report	Amat 53', 54', 65'

Minor Arena, Dynamo Stadium

=== Women's team competition ===
- Team Roster:

- Margaret Toscano
- Sudha Chaudhry
- Gangotri Bhandari
- Rekha Mundphan
- Rup Kumari Saini
- Varsha Soni
- Eliza Nelson
- Prem Maya Sonir
- Nazleen Madraswalla
- Selma d'Silva
- Lorraine Fernandes
- Harpreet Gill
- Balwinder Kaur Bhatia
- Geeta Sareen
- Nisha Sharma
- Hutoxi Bagli

==== Preliminary ====
Pos	Team	Pld	W	D	L	GF	GA	GD	Pts
1st place, gold medalist(s)	Zimbabwe	5	3	2	0	13	4	+9	8
2nd place, silver medalist(s)	Czechoslovakia	5	3	1	1	10	5	+5	7
3rd place, bronze medalist(s)	Soviet Union	5	3	0	2	11	5	+6	6
4	India	5	2	1	2	9	6	+3	5
5	Austria	5	2	0	3	6	11	−5	4
6	Poland	5	0	0	5	0	18	−18	0

Source: FIH

25 July 1980
12:45

Austria	0–2	India
	Report	Fernandes (1); Saini (1)

Stadium:
Young Pioneers Stadium

27 July 1980
13:00

India	4–0	Poland
Saini (1); Sharma (2); Sonir (1)	Report

Stadium:
Minor Arena, Dynamo Stadium

28 July 1980
13:00

India	1–2	Czechoslovakia
Sonir (1)	Report	Hubáčková (1); Kyselicová (1)

Stadium:
Young Pioneers Stadium

30 July 1980
17:15

India	1–1	Zimbabwe
Saini (1)	Report	Chase (1)

Stadium:
Minor Arena, Dynamo Stadium

31 July 1980
15:30

Soviet Union	3–1	India
Buzunova (2); Krasnikova (1)	Report	Saini (1)

Stadium:
Minor Arena, Dynamo Stadium
