= Soviet Union men's national field hockey team =

Soviet Union
- Association: Federation of bandy and field hockey USSR
- Confederation: EHF (Europe)

Olympic Games
- Appearances: 2 (first in 1980)
- Best result: (bronze) 3rd (1980)

World Cup
- Appearances: 3 (first in 1982)
- Best result: 4th (1986)

European Championship
- Appearances: 5 (first in 1970)
- Best result: (silver) 2nd (1983)
Medal record
Event	1st	2nd	3rd
Olympic Games	0	0	1
European Championship	0	1	0
Friendship Games	1	0	0
Total	1	1	1
Olympic Games
Bronze medal – third place	1980 Moscow	Team
European Championship
Silver medal – second place	1983 Amsterdam	
Friendship Games
Gold medal – first place	1984 Moscow	Team

The Soviet Union men's national field hockey team represented the Soviet Union in men's international field hockey. The team was controlled by the Federation of bandy and field hockey USSR.

It was one of the leading national teams during the period of 1980s-1990s from Europe. It won the bronze medal as the host of the 1980 Summer Olympics and reached the semi-finals of World Cup in 1986 where it finished fourth.

== Tournament record ==
=== Summer Olympics ===
- 1980 – (bronze)
- 1988 – 7th place

=== World Cup ===
- 1982 – 6th place
- 1986 – 4th place
- 1990 – 6th place

=== European Championship ===
- 1970 – 14th place
- 1978 – 9th place
- 1983 – (silver)
- 1987 – 4th place
- 1991 – 4th place

=== Friendship Games ===
- 1984 – (gold)

=== Champions Trophy ===
- 1982 – 6th place
- 1987 – 8th place
- 1988 – 4th place
- 1990 – 5th place
- 1991 – 6th place

=== Sultan Azlan Shah Cup ===
- 1991 – (bronze)

== Past squads ==
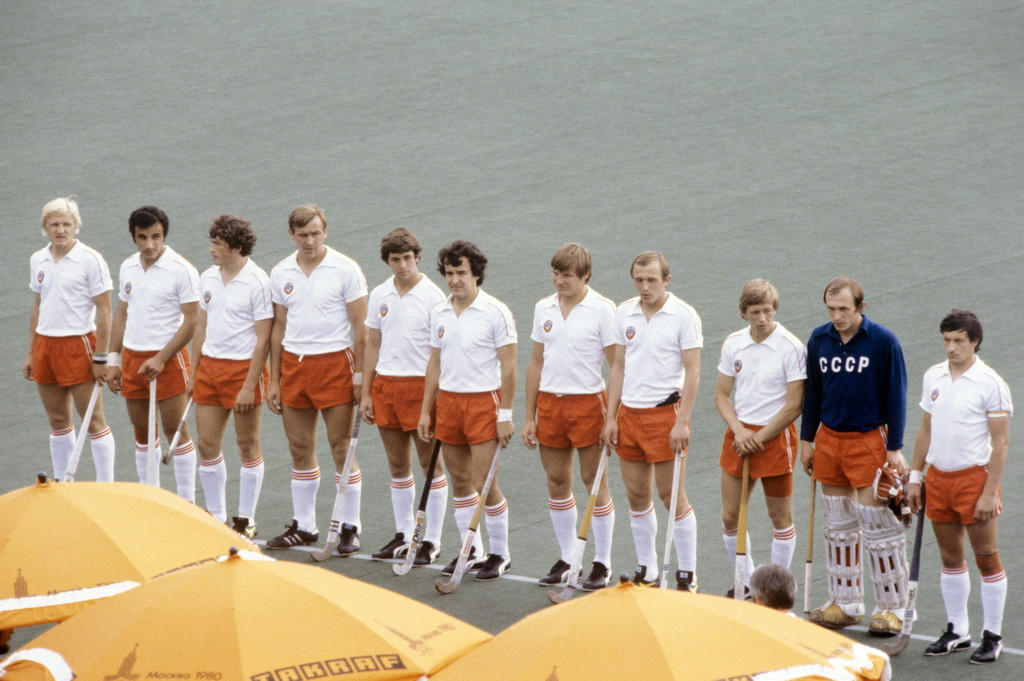
Soviet Union team at the 1980 Moscow Olympics

=== 1980 Olympic Games ===
- Vladimir Pleshakov
- Viacheslav Lampeev
- Leonid Pavlovski
- Sos Hayrapetyan
- Farit Zigangirov
- Valeri Belyakov
- Sergei Klevtsov
- Oleg Zagorodnev
- Aleksandr Gusev
- Sergei Pleshakov
- Mikhail Nichepurenko
- Minneula Azizov
- Aleksandr Sychyov
- Aleksandr Miasnikov
- Viktor Deputatov
- Aleksandr Goncharov

== See also ==
- Russia men's national field hockey team
- Soviet Union women's national field hockey team
