= Field hockey at the Friendship Games =

Field hockey at the Friendship Games was contested in two events. Men's event took place at the Minor Arena of the Central Dynamo Stadium in Moscow, Soviet Union between 18 and 26 August 1984. Women's event took place in Poznań, Poland between 28 and 30 August 1984.

== Men's event ==
Eight teams were drawn into two groups.

The host nation, Soviet Union, had two teams in the tournament. However, the Soviet Union "B" team competed "off competition". Despite ending the tournament on the third place, this result was not included in the final rankings. The fourth team (i. e. Zimbabwe) was instead counted as the third place team, etc.

=== Group A ===
Team	Pld	W	D	L	GF	GA	GD	Points
Poland	3	2	1	0	9	3	+6	5
Soviet Union B	3	2	0	1	6	1	+5	4
East Germany	3	1	1	1	4	4	0	3
Cuba	3	0	0	3	2	13	-11	0

==== Results ====
Results	(Poland)	(Soviet Union) B	(East Germany)	(Cuba)
Poland		1:0	2:2	6:1
Soviet Union B	0:1		1:0	5:0
East Germany	2:2	0:1		2:1
Cuba	1:6	0:5	1:2	

=== Group B ===
Team	Pld	W	D	L	GF	GA	GD	Points
Soviet Union A	3	3	0	0	29	1	+28	6
Zimbabwe	3	2	0	1	13	9	+5	4
Finland	3	1	0	2	7	8	-1	2
Afghanistan	3	0	0	3	0	31	-31	0

==== Results ====
Results	(Soviet Union) A	(Zimbabwe)	(Finland)	(Afghanistan)
Soviet Union A		9:1	7:0	13:0
Zimbabwe	1:9		1:0	11:0
Finland	0:7	0:1		7:0
Afghanistan	0:13	0:11	0:7	

=== Final round ===
Semifinals
A1	Poland	4
B2	Zimbabwe	1
B1	Soviet Union A	8
A2	Soviet Union B	0

Final
Poland	1
Soviet Union A	2
Third place
Zimbabwe	1
Soviet Union B	4

=== Classification 5th–8th ===
5th-8th place
A3	East Germany	27
B4	Afghanistan	0
B3	Finland	2
A4	Cuba	5

5th place match
East Germany	3
Cuba	1
7th place match
Afghanistan	2
Finland	4

=== Final ranking ===
Gold medal	Soviet Union A
Silver medal	Poland
Bronze medal	Zimbabwe
4	East Germany
5	Cuba
6	Finland
7	Afghanistan
–	Soviet Union B *

* – Soviet Union B competed "off competition" and was not included in the final ranking table.

== Women's event ==
Four teams competed in a round-robin tournament.

	Team	Pld	W	D	L	GF	GA	GD	Points
Gold medal	Soviet Union	3	3	0	0	13	1	+12	6
Silver medal	Poland	3	1	1	1	3	6	-3	3
Bronze medal	East Germany	3	1	1	1	3	6	-3	3
4	Czechoslovakia	3	0	0	3	0	6	-6	0

=== Results ===
Results	(Soviet Union)	(Poland)	(East Germany)	(Czechoslovakia)
Soviet Union		5:1	5:0	3:0
Poland	1:5		1:1	1:0
East Germany	0:5	1:1		2:0
Czechoslovakia	0:3	0:1	0:2	

=== Second place penalty shootout ===
Because East Germany and Poland had the same number of points, goals and their match was a draw, a penalty shoot-out was played between the two teams.

2nd place penalty shootout
East Germany	10
Poland	12

Poland won and was ranked second, while East Germany was ranked third.

== Winning teams' squads ==
Event	Gold	Silver	Bronze
Men's	Soviet Union Sos Hayrapetyan; Vladimir Antakov; Minneula Azizov; Valery Belyakov; Mikhail Bukatin; Vyacheslav Chechenev; Viktor Deputatov; Aleksandr Goncharov; Serik Kalimbayev; Aleksandr Myasnikov; Mikhail Nichepurenko; Sergey Pleshakov; Vladimir Pleshakov; Viacheslav Sgaronov; Oleg Zagorodnev; Farit Zigangirov	Poland Leszek Andrzejczak; Leszek Bąska; Leszek Hensler; Zygfryd Józefiak; Wojciech Klatt; Marian Kubisiak; Zbigniew Kulpa; Sławomir Łukaszewski; Wacław Łukaszewski; Jacek Merlinger; Jerzy Mirosław; Andrzej Myśliwiec; Karol Podżorski; Zbigniew Rachwalski; Jan Rygol; Jerzy Wybieralski	Zimbabwe ?
Women's	Soviet Union Svetlana Abramienkova; Tamara Bakhtina; Larisa Chizhik; Yelena Kondrutskaya; Olga Kondrutskaya; Natella Krasnikova; Lyubov Makarenko; Angeliya Maldonite; Nadezhda Pugina; Svetlana Tolstova; Nelia Vakhramiena; Zoya Valuyskaya; Alla Vlasova; Tatyana Zhuk; Yelena Guryeva; Galina Inzhuvatova	Poland Jolanta Błędowska; Alicja Dziuk; Dorota Dziuk; Małgorzata Helińska; Halina Jodłowska; Małgorzata Kępińska; Grażyna Kuczka; Małgorzata Lipska; Lucyna Matuszna; Aldona Murańska; Ewa Olesińska; Bogumiła Pajor; Dorota Witos; Małgorzata Włosek; Zuzanna Zawilska; Lidia Zgajewska	East Germany Steffi Bartsch; Adelgunde Lösch; Seglinde Ludwig; Elke Lückert; Birgit Mann; Andrea Meiling; Ina Nitzschke; Grit Pendelin; Martina Siedschlag; Christine Taday; Susann Ulrich; Anke Wagner; Iris Weis; Andrea Wiebecke; Kann Wienrich; Isolde Wilke

== Medal table ==
* Host nation (Soviet Union)

Rank	Nation	Gold	Silver	Bronze	Total
1	Soviet Union (URS)*	2	0	0	2
2	Poland (POL)*	0	2	0	2
3	East Germany (GDR)	0	0	1	1
3	Zimbabwe (ZIM)	0	0	1	1
Totals (4 entries)		2	2	2	6

== See also ==
- Field hockey at the 1984 Summer Olympics
