= Field hockey at the 1980 Summer Olympics – Men's tournament =

Men's field hockey at the 1980 Summer Olympics
- Olympic field hockey

Tournament details
- Host country: Soviet Union
- City: Moscow
- Dates: 20–29 July 1980
- Teams: 6
- Venue(s): Minor Arena of Dynamo Stadium; Young Pioneers Stadium

Final positions
- Champions: India (8th title)
- Runner-up: Spain
- Third place: Soviet Union

Tournament statistics
- Matches played: 18
- Goals scored: 146 (8.11 per match)
- Top scorer: Juan Amat (16 goals)

The men's field hockey tournament at the 1980 Summer Olympics was the 14th edition of the field hockey event for men at the Summer Olympic Games. It was held over a ten-day period beginning on 20 July, and culminating on 29 July 1980. Games were played across two venues in Moscow, at the Minor Arena at Dynamo Stadium and Young Pioneers Stadium.

India won the gold medal for the eighth time, defeating Spain 4–3 in the gold-medal match. Soviet Union won the bronze medal after defeating Poland 2–1 in the bronze-medal match.

== Qualification ==
The original plan was for a twelve-team tournament, divided into two round-robin groups of six, with the top two of each qualifying for the semi-finals.

Group A

- Pakistan
- Netherlands
- India
- Great Britain
- Argentina
- Kenya

Group B

- Soviet Union
- West Germany
- Australia
- New Zealand (defending champions, Montreal 1976)
- Spain
- Malaysia

However, nine of the twelve teams withdrew as part of the U.S.-led boycott in response to the Soviet invasion of Afghanistan.

Argentina, Kenya, Pakistan, Malaysia, and West Germany boycotted completely, and while Australia, Great Britain, the Netherlands, and New Zealand competed in some sports, their hockey governing bodies pulled out.

The organising committee subsequently reduced the competition to six teams, the minimum required to hold a competition, with Cuba and Tanzania representing the Americas and Africa in place of Argentina and Kenya respectively, while Poland were invited as the next best team from the 1978 World Cup.

== Results ==
=== Preliminary ===
Pos	Team	Pld	W	D	L	GF	GA	GD	Pts	Qualification
1	Spain	5	4	1	0	33	3	+30	9	Gold-medal match
2	India	5	3	2	0	39	6	+33	8	Gold-medal match
3	Soviet Union	5	3	0	2	30	11	+19	6	Bronze-medal match
4	Poland	5	2	1	2	19	15	+4	5	Bronze-medal match
5	Cuba	5	1	0	4	7	42	−35	2	
6	Tanzania	5	0	0	5	3	54	−51	0	

Source: FIH

20 July 1980
11:00

Poland	7–1	Cuba
Rachwalski 8'; Horwat 27', 48'; Hensler 33'; Torz 42'; Bak 63'; Mysliwiec 69'	Report	Izquierdo 49'

Minor Arena, Dynamo Stadium

20 July 1980
12:45

India	18–0	Tanzania
Deavinder 4', 21', 25', 27'; Baskaran 15', 29', 57', 63'; Shahid 17'; Surinder 23', 30', 31', 34', 58'; Fernandes 27'; Iqbal 52', 55'; Kaushik 61'	Report

Minor Arena, Dynamo Stadium

20 July 1980
17:00

Soviet Union	1–2	Spain
Lampeev 18'	Report	Coghen 32'; Amat 57'

Minor Arena, Dynamo Stadium

21 July 1980
11:00

Soviet Union	11–2	Cuba
Klevtsov 2', 44'; Pleshakov 4'; Pavlovski 10'; Belyakov 17'; Gusev 34'; Zagorodnev 41', 54'; Nichepurenko 42', 56'; Lampeev 59'	Report	Izquierdo 29', 52'

Minor Arena, Dynamo Stadium

21 July 1980
12:45

Spain	12–0	Tanzania
Garralda 2'; Coghen 7', 24', 28', 30', 43'; Monsalve 31'; Malgosa 34', 41'; Chaves 44'; Amat 65', 68'	Report

Minor Arena, Dynamo Stadium

21 July 1980
17:00

India	2–2	Poland
Deavinder 31'; Fernandes 69'	Report	Stanislawski 39'; Wybieralski 65'

Minor Arena, Dynamo Stadium

23 July 1980
11:00

Tanzania	0–4	Cuba
	Report	Mico 6'; Izquierdo 29', 45', 50'

Minor Arena, Dynamo Stadium

23 July 1980
12:45

Spain	2–2	India
Amat 21'; Cabot 43'	Report	Surinder 15', 65'

Minor Arena, Dynamo Stadium

23 July 1980
17:00

Soviet Union	5–1	Poland
Belyakov 24'; Pleshakov 26'; Klevtsov 41'; Gusev 42', 49'	Report	Torz 60'

Minor Arena, Dynamo Stadium

24 July 1980
11:00

India	13–0	Cuba
Surinder 3', 11', 43', 64'; Shahid 8', 40'; Rajinder 12', 19'; Amarjit 18', 35'; Baskaran 22'; Deavinder 30', 63'	Report

Minor Arena, Dynamo Stadium

24 July 1980
12:45

Spain	6–0	Poland
Amat 10'; Fábregas 12'; Malgosa 15'; Roca 17'; Chaves 18'; Pellón 69'	Report

Minor Arena, Dynamo Stadium

24 July 1980
17:00

Soviet Union	11–2	Tanzania
Lampeev 6', 20', 22', 41', 47'; Zagorodnev 9'; Zigangirov 17', 26'; Klevtsov 27'; Goncharov 55', 61'	Report	Manwar 32', 58'

Minor Arena, Dynamo Stadium

26 July 1980
11:00

Poland	9–1	Tanzania
Mysliwiec 5'; Wybieralski 29', 49', 57'; Stanislawski 33'; Torz 36', 42'; Horwat 52'; Mielniczak 61'	Report	D'Silva 12'

Minor Arena, Dynamo Stadium

26 July 1980
12:45

Soviet Union	2–4	India
Gusev 36'; Zigangirov 66'	Report	Deavinder 3'; Surinder 34'; Shahid 41'; Kaushik 64'

Minor Arena, Dynamo Stadium

26 July 1980
17:00

Cuba	0–11	Spain
	Report	Chaves 5', 54'; Amat 11', 13', 20', 26', 30', 33', 36', 50'; Roca 55'

Minor Arena, Dynamo Stadium

=== Classification ===
==== Fifth and sixth place ====
29 July 1980
11:00

Cuba	4–1	Tanzania
Pedroso 30'; Vazquez 36'; Izquierdo 37'; Hernandez 55'	Report	Sykes 51'

Young Pioneers Stadium

==== Bronze-medal match ====
29 July 1980
15:00

(bronze) Soviet Union	2–1	Poland
Lampeev 10', 32'	Report	Torz 67'

Minor Arena, Dynamo Stadium

== Gold-medal match ==
29 July 1980
17:00

(gold) India	4–3	Spain (silver)
S. Singh 24', 30'; Kaushik 42'; Shahid 58'	Report	Amat 53', 54', 65'

Minor Arena, Dynamo Stadium

== Final standings ==
1. India
2. Spain
3. Soviet Union
4. Poland
5. Cuba
6. Tanzania

== Goalscorers ==
There were 146 goals scored in 18 matches, for an average of 8.11 goals per match.

16 goals

- Juan Amat

15 goals

- (India) Surinder Singh Sodhi

9 goals

- (Soviet Union) Vyacheslav Lampeev

8 goals

- (India) Deavinder Singh

7 goals

- (Cuba) Bernabé Izquierdo

6 goals

- Juan Coghen

5 goals

- (India) Vasudevan Baskaran
- (India) Mohamed Shahid
- (Poland) Leszek Tórz

4 goals

- (Poland) Jerzy Wybieralski
- (Soviet Union) Aleksandr Gusev
- (Soviet Union) Sergei Klevtsov
- Miguel Chaves

3 goals

- (India) Maharaj Krishon Kaushik
- (Poland) Henryk Horwat
- (Soviet Union) Oleg Zagorodnev
- (Soviet Union) Farit Zigangirov
- Santiago Malgosa

2 goals

- (India) Mervyn Fernandis
- (India) Zafar Iqbal
- (India) Amarjit Singh Rana
- (India) Rajinder Singh
- (Poland) Andrzej Mysliwiec
- (Poland) Wlodzimierz Stanislawski
- (Soviet Union) Valeri Belyakov
- (Soviet Union) Aleksandr Goncharov
- (Soviet Union) Mikhail Nichepurenko
- (Soviet Union) Sergei Pleshakov
- Carlos Roca
- (Tanzania) Yusuf Manwar

1 goal

- (Cuba) Lazaro Hernández
- (Cuba) Jorge Mico
- (Cuba) Héctor Pedroso
- (Cuba) Edgardo Vázquez
- (Poland) Krystian Bąk
- (Poland) Leszek Hensler
- (Poland) Jan Mielniczak
- (Poland) Zbigniew Rachwalski
- (Soviet Union) Leonid Pavlovsky
- Ricardo Cabot
- Francisco Fábregas
- Rafael Garralda
- Paulino Monsalve
- Juan Pellón
- (Tanzania) Stephen D'Silva
- (Tanzania) Abraham Sykes

Source: FIH
