= Field hockey at the 1980 Summer Olympics =

Field hockey at the Games of the XXII Olympiad
- Venues: Minor Arena of the Dynamo Stadium and Young Pioneers Stadium
- Dates: July 20 – 31, 1980

Field hockey at the 1980 Summer Olympics in Moscow took place from July 20 to 31, 1980 at the Minor Arena of the Central Dynamo Stadium and the Young Pioneers Stadium. India won the men's tournament for the record eighth time, defeating Spain 4–3 in the final. The women's tournament was won by Zimbabwe.

The 33 matches of hockey events across the two venues were watched by 177,880 spectators.

== Competition schedule ==
| P | Pool Stage | C | Classification Matches |

| Event↓/Date → | Sun 20 | Mon 21 | Tue 22 | Wed 23 | Thu 24 | Fri 25 | Sat 26 | Sun 27 | Mon 28 | Tue 29 | Wed 30 | Thu 31 |
|---|---|---|---|---|---|---|---|---|---|---|---|---|
| Men | P | P | | P | P | | P | | | C | | |
| Women | | | | | | P | | P | P | | P | P |

== Medal summary ==
=== Medal table ===
* Host nation (Soviet Union)

Men's
| Rank | Nation | Gold | Silver | Bronze | Total |
|---|---|---|---|---|---|
| 1 | India | 1 | 0 | 0 | 1 |
| 2 | Spain | 0 | 1 | 0 | 1 |
| 3 | Soviet Union* | 0 | 0 | 1 | 1 |
| Totals (3 entries) | | 1 | 1 | 1 | 3 |

* Host nation (Soviet Union)

Women's
| Rank | Nation | Gold | Silver | Bronze | Total |
|---|---|---|---|---|---|
| 1 | Zimbabwe | 1 | 0 | 0 | 1 |
| 2 | Czechoslovakia | 0 | 1 | 0 | 1 |
| 3 | Soviet Union* | 0 | 0 | 1 | 1 |
| Totals (3 entries) | | 1 | 1 | 1 | 3 |

=== Men's medal winners ===
| Gold | Silver | Bronze |
|---|---|---|
| India; Vasudevan Baskaran; Bir Bhadur Chettri; Sylvanus Dung Dung; Merwyn Fernandes; Zafar Iqbal; Maharaj Krishan Kaushik; Charanjit Kumar; Maneyapanda Muthanna Somaya; Allan Schofield; Mohamed Shahid; Davinder Singh; Gurmail Singh; Amarjit Singh Rana; Rajinder Singh; Ravinder Pal Singh; Surinder Singh Sodhi | Spain; Juan Amat; Juan Arbós; Jaime Arbós; Javier Cabot; Ricardo Cabot; Miguel Chaves; Juan Coghen; Miguel de Paz; Francisco Fábregas; José Garcia; Rafael Garralda; Santiago Malgosa; Paulino Monsalve; Juan Pellón; Carlos Roca; Jaime Zumalacárregui | Soviet Union; Sos Hayrapetyan; Minneula Azizov; Valeri Belyakov; Viktor Deputatov; Aleksandr Goncharov; Aleksandr Gusev; Sergei Klevtsov; Viacheslav Lampeev; Aleksandr Miasnikov; Mikhail Nichepurenko; Leonid Pavlovski; Sergei Pleshakov; Vladimir Pleshakov; Aleksandr Sychyov; Oleg Zagorodnev; Farit Zigangirov |

=== Women's medal winners ===
| Gold | Silver | Bronze |
|---|---|---|
| Zimbabwe; Arlene Boxhall; Liz Chase; Sandra Chick; Gillian Cowley; Patricia Davies; Sarah English; Maureen George; Ann Grant; Susan Huggett; Patricia McKillop; Brenda Phillips; Christine Prinsloo; Sonia Robertson; Anthea Stewart; Helen Volk; Linda Watson | Czechoslovakia; Milada Blažková; Jiřina Čermáková; Jiřina Hájková; Berta Hrubá; Ida Hubáčková; Jiřina Kadlecová; Jarmila Králíčková; Jiřina Křížová; Alena Kyselicová; Jana Lahodová; Květa Petříčková; Viera Podhányiová; Iveta Šranková; Marie Sýkorová; Marta Urbanová; Lenka Vymazalová | Soviet Union; Liailia Akhmerova; Natalia Buzunova; Natalia Bykova; Tatiana Embakhtova; Nadezhda Filippova; Liudmila Frolova; Lidia Glubokova; Nelli Gorbatkova; Elena Guryeva; Galina Inzhuvatova; Alina Kham; Natella Krasnikova; Nadezhda Ovechkina; Tatiana Shvyganova; Galina Viuzhanina; Valentina Zazdravnykh |
