= Ricardo Cabot =

Ricardo Cabot may refer to:

- Ricardo Cabot (footballer) (1885–1958), Spanish footballer
- Ricardo Cabot Boix (1917–2014), his son, Spanish field hockey player
- Ricardo Cabot (field hockey, born 1949), his son, Spanish field hockey player
