= Hockey at the 1980 Olympics =

Hockey at the 1980 Olympics may refer to:

- Ice hockey at the 1980 Winter Olympics
- Field hockey at the 1980 Summer Olympics
