= Andrzejczak =

Andrzejczak is a Polish surname. Notable people with the surname include:

- Bob Andrzejczak (born 1986), American politician
- Leszek Andrzejczak (born 1959), Polish field hockey player
- Rajmund Andrzejczak (born 1967), Polish general, Chief of the General Staff of the Polish Armed Forces
