= Juan Ríos =

Juan Ríos can refer to:

- Juan Antonio Ríos (1888-1946), President of Chile
- Juan Ríos (baseball) (1942-1995), Puerto Rican baseball player
- Juan Ríos (field hockey) (born 1947), Cuban Olympic hockey player
- Juan Ríos (tennis) (born 1966), Puerto Rican tennis player
