= Juan Caballero =

Juan Caballero can refer to:

- Juan Caballero (field hockey)
- Juan Caballero (footballer)
