= East Germany women's national field hockey team =

East Germany
- Confederation: EHF (Europe)
Medal record
Friendship Games
Bronze medal – third place	1984 Poznań	Team

The East Germany women's national field hockey team represented East Germany in women's international field hockey competitions.

The team participated once at the Friendship Games in 1984 when it won the bronze medal.

== Tournament record ==
=== Friendship Games ===
- 1984 – (bronze)

== See also ==
- East Germany men's national field hockey team
- Germany women's national field hockey team
