= 1990 Men's Hockey Champions Trophy =

International hockey tournament

Tournament details
- Host country: Australia
- City: Melbourne
- Dates: 17–25 November
- Teams: 6 (from 3 confederations)

Final positions
- Champions: Australia (5th title)
- Runner-up: Netherlands
- Third place: Germany

Tournament statistics
- Matches played: 15
- Goals scored: 61 (4.07 per match)
- Top scorer: (Netherlands) Gijs Weterings (9 goals)

The 1990 Men's Hockey Champions Trophy ' was the 12th edition of the Hockey Champions Trophy, an international men's field hockey tournament organized by the FIH. It took place from 17 to 25 November 1990 in Melbourne, Australia.

The hosts, Australia won a record-extending fifth title and their second title in a row by finishing first in the round-robin tournament.

== Tournament ==
All times are Australian Eastern Daylight Time (UTC+11:00)

=== Pool ===
Pos	Team	Pld	W	D	L	GF	GA	GD	Pts
1st place, gold medalist(s)	Australia (C, H)	5	4	0	1	14	6	+8	8
2nd place, silver medalist(s)	Netherlands	5	3	1	1	14	8	+6	7
3rd place, bronze medalist(s)	Germany	5	3	1	1	14	12	+2	7
4	Pakistan	5	2	0	3	12	11	+1	4
5	Soviet Union	5	1	0	4	4	11	−7	2
6	Great Britain	5	1	0	4	3	13	−10	2

Source: FIH
(C) Champions; (H) Hosts

=== Results ===
17 November 1990
13:30

Netherlands	5–0	Great Britain

17 November 1990
15:30

Pakistan	6–3	Germany

18 November 1990
13:30

Australia	2–1	Soviet Union

18 November 1990
15:30

Germany	1–0	Great Britain

19 November 1990
16:00

Netherlands	1–0	Soviet Union

19 November 1990
18:00

Australia	3–0	Pakistan

21 November 1990
16:00

Netherlands	4–4	Germany

21 November 1990
18:00

Australia	4–0	Great Britain

22 November 1990
16:00

Pakistan	4–1	Soviet Union

22 November 1990
18:00

Australia	3–2	Netherlands

24 November 1990
13:00

Great Britain	2–1	Pakistan

24 November 1990
15:00

Germany	3–0	Soviet Union

25 November 1990
11:30

Netherlands	2–1	Pakistan

25 November 1990
13:30

Great Britain	1–2	Soviet Union

25 November 1990
15:30

Australia	2–3	Germany

== Statistics ==
=== Winners ===
1990 Men's Champions Trophy winners

Australia
Fifth title

=== Final standings ===
1. Australia
2. Netherlands
3. Germany
4. Pakistan
5. Soviet Union
6. Great Britain

=== Winning Squad ===
Australia

- Craig Davies
- Warren Birmingham
- Darren Bannerman
- Ashley Carey
- Greg Corbitt
- Stephen Davies
- Andrew Deane
- Lachlan Dreher
- Dean Evans
- Stewart Dearing
- Mark Hager
- Graham Reid
- Jay Stacy
- David Wansbrough
- Ken Wark
- Michael York
