= Ricardo Campos (field hockey) =

Cuban hockey player

Personal information
- Nationality: Cuban
- Born: 6 February 1959 (age 67)

Sport
- Sport: Field hockey

Ricardo Campos (born 6 February 1959) is a Cuban field hockey player. He competed in the men's tournament at the 1980 Summer Olympics.
