= Radhey Shyam =

Indian basketball player

Radhey Shyam Bijarniya
Personal information
- Citizenship: India
- Born: May 1, 1953; Sikar, Rajasthan, India
- Died: August 19, 2006 (aged 53)

Sport
- Sport: Basketball

Radhey Shyam Bijarniya (1 May 1953 – 19 August 2006) was an Indian basketball player from Sikar, Rajasthan. He represented India at the 1980 Summer Olympics and the 1982 Asian Games. He was the second best scorer from the Indian team averaging 14 points after the leading scorer Ajmer Singh Chopra at the 1980 Summer Olympics. He was a recipient of the Arjuna Award in 1983.
