= Zygfryd Józefiak =

Polish hockey player

Personal information
- Nationality: Polish
- Born: 17 August 1954 (age 71) Poznań, Poland

Sport
- Sport: Field hockey

Zygfryd Józefiak (born 17 August 1954) is a Polish field hockey player. He competed in the men's tournament at the 1980 Summer Olympics.
