= 1983 Men's EuroHockey Nations Championship =

Tournament details
- Host country: Netherlands
- City: Amstelveen
- Dates: 18–28 August
- Teams: 12 (from 1 confederation)
- Venue(s): Wagener Stadium

Final positions
- Champions: Netherlands (1st title)
- Runner-up: Soviet Union
- Third place: West Germany

Tournament statistics
- Matches played: 42
- Goals scored: 189 (4.5 per match)

The 1983 Men's EuroHockey Nations Championship was the fourth edition of the Men's EuroHockey Nations Championship, the quadrennial international men's field hockey championship of Europe organized by the European Hockey Federation. It was held in Amstelveen, Netherlands from 18 to 28 August 1983.

The hosts the Netherlands won their first title by defeating the Soviet Union 8–6 in penalty strokes after the match finished 2–2 after extra time. The defending champions West Germany won the bronze medal by defeating Spain 3–1.

== Preliminary round ==
=== Pool A ===
Pos	Team	Pld	W	D	L	GF	GA	GD	Pts	Qualification
1	Spain	5	5	0	0	24	5	+19	10	Semi-finals
2	West Germany	5	4	0	1	23	8	+15	8	Semi-finals
3	England	5	2	1	2	16	9	+7	5	
4	France	5	1	2	2	8	9	−1	4	
5	Wales	5	1	1	3	7	14	−7	3	
6	Austria	5	0	0	5	3	36	−33	0	

Source: TheSports.org

18 August 1983

West Germany	8–0	Austria

18 August 1983

England	2–3	Spain

18 August 1983

France	1–1	Wales

19 August 1983

Spain	10–0	Austria

19 August 1983

Wales	0–2	England

19 August 1983

France	1–3	West Germany

21 August 1983

England	3–4	West Germany

21 August 1983

Austria	1–4	France

21 August 1983

Spain	4–0	Wales

22 August 1983

England	8–1	Austria

22 August 1983

France	1–3	Spain

22 August 1983

Wales	0–6	West Germany

24 August 1983

Wales	6–1	Austria

24 August 1983

France	1–1	England

24 August 1983

Spain	4–2	West Germany

=== Pool B ===
Pos	Team	Pld	W	D	L	GF	GA	GD	Pts	Qualification
1	Netherlands (H)	5	4	1	0	25	5	+20	9	Semi-finals
2	Soviet Union	5	4	1	0	18	3	+15	9	Semi-finals
3	Belgium	5	2	1	2	7	13	−6	5	
4	Scotland	5	1	1	3	8	13	−5	3	
5	Ireland	5	1	1	3	4	18	−14	3	
6	Poland	5	0	1	4	4	14	−10	1	

Source: TheSports.org
(H) Hosts

18 August 1983

Scotland	2–4	Belgium

18 August 1983

Netherlands	9–0	Ireland

18 August 1983

Soviet Union	4–0	Poland

20 August 1983

Belgium	0–3	Soviet Union

20 August 1983

Poland	1–2	Ireland

20 August 1983

Scotland	1–2	Netherlands

21 August 1983

Netherlands	2–2	Soviet Union

21 August 1983

Scotland	3–2	Ireland

21 August 1983

Belgium	2–1	Poland

23 August 1983

Netherlands	5–1	Poland

23 August 1983

Belgium	0–0	Ireland

23 August 1983

Scotland	1–4	Soviet Union

24 August 1983

Netherlands	7–1	Belgium

24 August 1983

Soviet Union	5–0	Ireland

24 August 1983

Scotland	1–1	Poland

== Classification round ==
=== Ninth to twelfth place classification ===
9–12th place semi-finals
26 August
Wales	0
Poland	1
26 August
Ireland	4
Austria	0

Ninth place
Poland	2
Ireland	0
Eleventh place
Wales	0
Austria	1

==== 9–12th place semi-finals ====
26 August 1983

Wales	0–1	Poland

26 August 1983

Ireland	4–0	Austria

==== Eleventh place game ====
Wales	0–1	Austria

==== Ninth place game ====
Poland	2–0	Ireland

=== Fifth to eighth place classification ===
5–8th place semi-finals
26 August
England (p.s.o.)	1 (?)
Scotland	1 (?)
26 August
Belgium	1
France	2

Fifth place
England	3
France	0
Seventh place
Scotland	2
Belgium	0

==== 5–8th place semi-finals ====
26 August 1983

England	1–1 (a.e.t.)	Scotland
Penalties
	?–?

26 August 1983

Belgium	1–2	France

==== Seventh place game ====
Scotland	2–0	Belgium

==== Fifth place game ====
England	3–0	France

=== First to fourth place classification ===
Semi-finals
26 August
Netherlands (a.e.t.)	4
West Germany	1
26 August
Spain	2
Soviet Union	4

Final
Netherlands (p.s.o.)	4 (8)
Soviet Union	4 (6)
Third place
West Germany	3
Spain	1

==== Semi-finals ====
26 August 1983

Netherlands	4–1 (a.e.t.)	West Germany

26 August 1983

Spain	2–4	Soviet Union

==== Third place game ====
West Germany	3–1	Spain

==== Final ====
Netherlands	4–4 (a.e.t.)	Soviet Union
Penalties
	8–6

== Final standings ==
1. Netherlands
2. Soviet Union
3. West Germany
4. Spain
5. England
6. France
7. Scotland
8. Belgium
9. Poland
10. Ireland
11. Austria
12. Wales
