= Andrzej Mikina =

Polish field hockey player

Personal information
- Nationality: Polish
- Born: 30 September 1955 (age 70) Rogowo, Poland
- Height: 188 cm (6 ft 2 in)

Sport
- Sport: Field hockey

Andrzej Mikina (born 30 September 1955) is a Polish field hockey player. He competed in the men's tournament at the 1980 Summer Olympics.
