= Jan Sitek =

Polish hockey player

Personal information
- Nationality: Polish
- Born: 12 June 1953 (age 72) Siemianowice, Poland

Sport
- Sport: Field hockey

Jan Sitek (born 12 June 1953) is a Polish field hockey player. He competed in the men's tournament at the 1980 Summer Olympics.
