= Javier Cabot =

Spanish field hockey player (born 1953)

Personal information
- Born: 27 September 1953 (age 72)
Medal record
Men's Field Hockey
Representing Spain
Olympic Games
Silver medal – second place	1980 Moscow	Team competition

Javier Cabot Durán (born 27 September 1953) is a former field hockey player from Spain, who won the silver medal with the national team at the 1980 Summer Olympics in Moscow.

Javier's grandfather Ricardo Cabot Montalt, who was better known for being a footballer, sports journalist, manager, and sports director, was the first in a family of field hockey players. Javier's father, Ricardo Cabot Boix, and brother, Ricardo Cabot Durán, were also field hockey internationals, representing Spain at the 1948 Summer Olympics and the 1980 Summer Olympics, respectively.
