= East Germany men's national field hockey team =

East Germany
- Confederation: EHF (Europe)

Olympic Games
- Appearances: 1 (first in 1968)
- Best result: 11th (1968)

The East Germany men's national field hockey team represented East Germany in men's international field hockey competitions.

The team participated once at the Olympic Games where it finished in 11th place at the 1968 edition.

== Tournament record ==
=== Summer Olympics ===
- 1968 – 11th place

=== Friendship Games ===
- 1984 – 4th place

== See also ==
- East Germany women's national field hockey team
- Germany men's national field hockey team
