= Krzysztof Głodowski =

Polish hockey player

Personal information
- Nationality: Polish
- Born: 13 April 1955 (age 71) Słupsk, Poland

Sport
- Sport: Field hockey

Krzysztof Głodowski (born 13 April 1955) is a Polish field hockey player. He competed in the men's tournament at the 1980 Summer Olympics.
