= Ángel Fontane =

Cuban field hockey player

Personal information
- Nationality: Cuban
- Born: 21 July 1960 (age 65)

Sport
- Sport: Field hockey

Ángel Fontane (born 21 July 1960) is a Cuban field hockey player. He competed in the men's tournament at the 1980 Summer Olympics.
