= Severo Frometa =

Cuban hockey player

Personal information
- Nationality: Cuban
- Born: 9 August 1951 (age 74)

Sport
- Sport: Field hockey

Severo Frometa (born 9 August 1951) is a Cuban field hockey player. He competed in the men's tournament at the 1980 Summer Olympics.
