= Tomás Varela =

Cuban hockey player (born 1948)

Personal information
- Nationality: Cuban
- Born: 7 March 1948 (age 78)

Sport
- Sport: Field hockey

Tomás Varela (born 7 March 1948) is a Cuban field hockey player. He competed in the men's tournament at the 1980 Summer Olympics.
