= Adam Dolatowski =

Polish field hockey player

Personal information
- Born: 31 October 1957 (age 68) Toruń, Poland
- Height: 182 cm (6 ft 0 in)
- Weight: 76 kg (168 lb)

Sport
- Sport: Field hockey
- Club: Lech Poznań

Adam Dolatowski (born 31 October 1957) is a Polish field hockey player. He competed in the men's tournament at the 1980 Summer Olympics.
