= Mariusz Kubiak =

Polish hockey player

Personal information
- Nationality: Polish
- Born: 6 June 1958 (age 67) Gniezno, Poland

Sport
- Sport: Field hockey

Mariusz Kubiak (born 6 June 1958) is a Polish field hockey player. He competed in the men's tournament at the 1980 Summer Olympics.
