= 1987 Men's EuroHockey Nations Championship =

Tournament details
- Host country: Soviet Union
- City: Moscow
- Dates: 20–30 August
- Teams: 12 (from 1 confederation)
- Venue: Dynamo Stadium

Final positions
- Champions: Netherlands (2nd title)
- Runner-up: England
- Third place: West Germany

Tournament statistics
- Matches played: 42
- Goals scored: 162 (3.86 per match)

The 1987 Men's EuroHockey Nations Championship was the fifth edition of the Men's EuroHockey Nations Championship, the quadrennial international men's field hockey championship of Europe organized by the European Hockey Federation. It was held in Moscow, Soviet Union, from 20 to 30 August 1987.

The defending champions the Netherlands won their second title by defeating England 3–0 in penalty strokes after the match finished 1–1 after extra time. West Germany won the bronze medal by defeating the hosts, the Soviet Union 3–2 after extra time.

== Preliminary round ==
=== Pool A ===
| Pos | Team | Pld | W | D | L | GF | GA | GD | Pts | Qualification |
|---|---|---|---|---|---|---|---|---|---|---|
| 1 | England | 5 | 5 | 0 | 0 | 21 | 1 | +20 | 10 | Semi-finals |
| 2 | Netherlands | 5 | 4 | 0 | 1 | 18 | 3 | +15 | 8 | Semi-finals |
| 3 | Spain | 5 | 2 | 1 | 2 | 15 | 7 | +8 | 5 | |
| 4 | Scotland | 5 | 1 | 2 | 2 | 5 | 13 | −8 | 4 | |
| 5 | Belgium | 5 | 1 | 1 | 3 | 10 | 17 | −7 | 3 | |
| 6 | Italy | 5 | 0 | 0 | 5 | 3 | 31 | −28 | 0 | |

Source: TheSports.org

20 August 1987

| Netherlands | 4–0 | Scotland |

20 August 1987

| Spain | 2–1 | Belgium |

20 August 1987

| England | 7–0 | Italy |

21 August 1987

| Scotland | 1–0 | Italy |

21 August 1987

| Belgium | 1–4 | England |

21 August 1987

| Netherlands | 1–0 | Spain |

23 August 1987

| Spain | 11–0 | Italy |

23 August 1987

| England | 5–0 | Scotland |

23 August 1987

| Netherlands | 6–1 | Belgium |

24 August 1987

| Scotland | 2–2 | Belgium |

24 August 1987

| Italy | 0–7 | Netherlands |

24 August 1987

| Spain | 0–3 | England |

25 August 1987

| Belgium | 5–3 | Italy |

25 August 1987

| Spain | 2–2 | Scotland |

25 August 1987

| England | 2–0 | Netherlands |

=== Pool B ===
| Pos | Team | Pld | W | D | L | GF | GA | GD | Pts | Qualification |
|---|---|---|---|---|---|---|---|---|---|---|
| 1 | West Germany | 5 | 5 | 0 | 0 | 16 | 3 | +13 | 10 | Semi-finals |
| 2 | Soviet Union (H) | 5 | 3 | 1 | 1 | 8 | 3 | +5 | 7 | Semi-finals |
| 3 | Ireland | 5 | 3 | 1 | 1 | 9 | 6 | +3 | 7 | |
| 4 | Poland | 5 | 2 | 0 | 3 | 10 | 12 | −2 | 4 | |
| 5 | Wales | 5 | 0 | 1 | 4 | 3 | 12 | −9 | 1 | |
| 6 | France | 5 | 0 | 1 | 4 | 2 | 12 | −10 | 1 | |

Source: TheSports.org
(H) Hosts

20 August 1987

| West Germany | 4–0 | Ireland |

20 August 1987

| France | 1–3 | Poland |

20 August 1987

| Soviet Union | 2–0 | Wales |

22 August 1987

| West Germany | 4–2 | Poland |

22 August 1987

| Wales | 1–1 | France |

22 August 1987

| Soviet Union | 1–1 | Ireland |

23 August 1987

| West Germany | 3–1 | Wales |

23 August 1987

| Poland | 1–3 | Ireland |

23 August 1987

| Soviet Union | 2–0 | France |

25 August 1987

| Wales | 2–3 | Ireland |

25 August 1987

| West Germany | 4–0 | France |

25 August 1987

| Soviet Union | 3–1 | Poland |

26 August 1987

| France | 0–2 | Ireland |

26 August 1987

| Wales | 1–3 | Poland |

26 August 1987

| West Germany | 1–0 | Soviet Union |

== Classification round ==
=== Ninth to twelfth place classification ===
9–12th place semi-finals
28 August
Belgium (p.s.o.) | 3 (9)
France | 3 (8)
28 August
Wales | 1
Italy | 2

Ninth place
29 August
Belgium | 1 (6)
Italy (p.s.o.) | 1 (7)
Eleventh place
29 August
France | 1
Wales | 0

==== 9–12th place semi-finals ====
28 August 1987

| Belgium | 3–3 (a.e.t.) | France |
Penalties
| | 8–7 |

28 August 1987

| Italy | 2–1 | Wales |

==== Eleventh place game ====
29 August 1987

| France | 1–0 | Wales |

==== Ninth place game ====
29 August 1987

| Belgium | 1–1 (a.e.t.) | Italy |
Penalties
| | 6–7 |

=== Fifth to eighth place classification ===
5–8th place semi-finals
28 August
Ireland | 3
Scotland | 2
28 August
Spain | 0
Poland | 2

Fifth place
29 August
Ireland | 1
Poland | 2
Seventh place
30 August
Spain (p.s.o.) | 3 (3)
Scotland | 3 (2)

==== 5–8th place semi-finals ====
28 August 1987

| Ireland | 3–2 | Scotland |

28 August 1987

| Spain | 0–2 | Poland |

==== Seventh place game ====
30 August 1987

| Spain | 3–3 (a.e.t.) | Scotland |
Penalties
| | 3–2 |

==== Fifth place game ====
29 August 1987

| Ireland | 1–2 | Poland |

=== First to fourth place classification ===
Semi-finals
28 August
West Germany | 1
Netherlands | 2
28 August
England | 2
Soviet Union | 0

Final
30 August
Netherlands (p.s.o.) | 1 (3)
England | 1 (0)
Third place
30 August
West Germany (a.e.t.) | 3
Soviet Union | 2

==== Semi-finals ====
28 August 1987

| England | 2–0 | Soviet Union |

28 August 1987

| West Germany | 1–2 | Netherlands |

==== Third place game ====
30 August 1987

| West Germany | 3–2 (a.e.t.) | Soviet Union |

==== Final ====
30 August 1987

| Netherlands | 1–1 (a.e.t.) | England |
Penalties
| | 3–0 |

== Final standings ==
1. Netherlands
2. England
3. West Germany
4. Soviet Union
5. Poland
6. Ireland
7. Spain
8. Scotland
9. Italy
10. Belgium
11. France
12. Wales

== See also ==
- 1987 Women's EuroHockey Nations Championship
