= Levon Hayrapetyan =

Armenian footballer

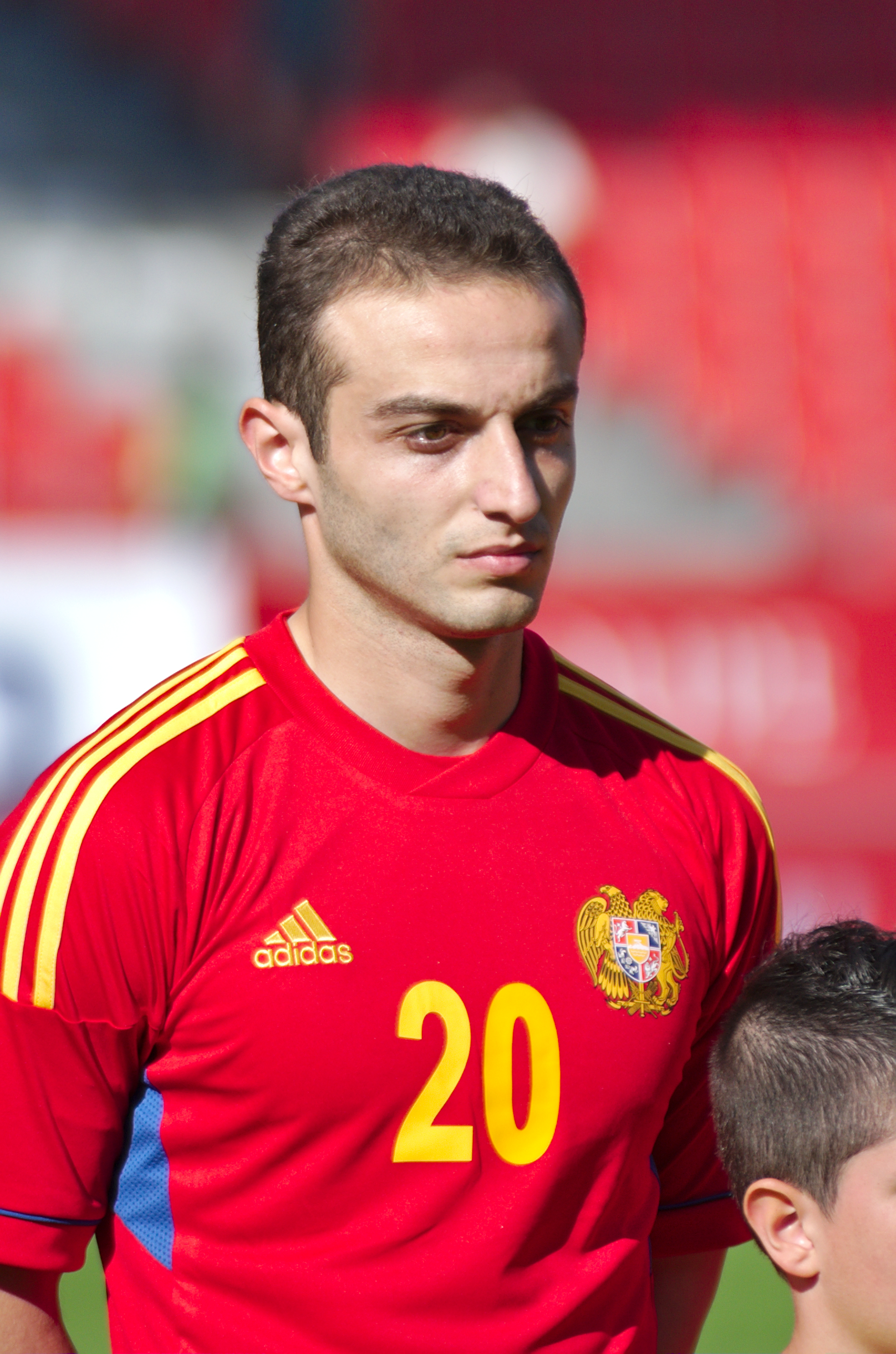

Personal information
- Full name: Levon Hayrapetyan
- Date of birth: 17 April 1989 (age 37)
- Place of birth: Yerevan, Armenian SSR, Soviet Union
- Height: 1.78 m (5 ft 10 in)
- Position: Left-back

Youth career
- Bramfelder SV von 1945
- 2004–2008: Hamburger SV

Senior career*
Years	Team	Apps	(Gls)
2008–2010	Hamburger SV II	7	(0)
2010	Pyunik	4	(0)
2011–2013	Lechia Gdańsk	38	(0)
2013	Widzew Łódź	9	(0)
2013	Widzew Łódź II	6	(1)
2014–2015	1. FK Příbram	2	(0)
2015–2016	Pyunik	25	(1)
2016–2017	Paykan	20	(0)
2017–2018	Pyunik	6	(0)
2018–2019	Alashkert	10	(1)
Total		127	(3)

International career
2008	Armenia U19	3	(0)
2009–2010	Armenia U21	6	(1)
2011–2017	Armenia	40	(1)
- * Club domestic league appearances and goals

Levon Hayrapetyan (Armenian: Լևոն Հայրապետյան, born 17 April 1989), also known as Levon Hairapetian, is an Armenian former professional footballer who played as a left-back.

He is the son of Olympic medal winning field hockey player Sos Hayrapetyan.

== Club career ==
Hayrapetyan is the pupil of the German school of football. He played in the amateur Bramefeldere 1945 club and the youth team of Hamburger SV. As part of Hamburger SV II, he spent seven games. Hayrapetyan also played four matches for Pyunik Yerevan. Pyunik won the 2010 Armenian Premier League with Levon a member of the club. In January 2011, he signed a contract with Polish club Lechia Gdańsk for a half-year deal.

On 5 June 2019, Hayrapetyan was released by FC Alashkert.

== International career ==
He played as a member of the Armenia U19 and U21 youth teams.

On 9 February 2011, Hayrapetyan made his debut in the Armenia national football team in a friendly match with Georgia. Levon suffered an injury on 11 September 2012 in a 2014 FIFA World Cup qualification away match against Bulgaria and underwent knee surgery in Munich. Hayrapetyan stated the operation went successful. He will be able to play again in about four months.

=== International goals ===
Scores and results list Armenia's goal tally first.

No	Date	Venue	Opponent	Score	Result	Competition
1.	28 March 2015	Stade de la Fontenette, Carouge, Switzerland	United Arab Emirates	1–0	4–3	Friendly

== Personal life ==
Levon is the son of field hockey Olympic medalist Sos Hayrapetyan. His father helped him in training. Hayrapetyan also holds German citizenship. His father moved to Hamburg when Levon was a child in order to play and coach for field hockey club Uhlenhorster HC.

== Honours ==
Pyunik

- Armenian Premier League: 2010, 2014–15
- Armenian Cup: 2010, 2014–15
- Armenian Supercup: 2015

Alashkert

- Armenian Cup: 2018–19
