= 1991 Men's EuroHockey Nations Championship =

Tournament details
- Host country: France
- City: Paris
- Dates: 12–23 June
- Teams: 12 (from 1 confederation)
- Venue(s): Stade Jules Noël

Final positions
- Champions: Germany (3rd title)
- Runner-up: Netherlands
- Third place: England

Tournament statistics
- Matches played: 42
- Goals scored: 175 (4.17 per match)
- Top scorer(s): (Netherlands) Floris Jan Bovelander (17 goals)

The 1991 Men's EuroHockey Nations Championship was the sixth edition of the Men's EuroHockey Nations Championship, the quadrennial international men's field hockey championship of Europe organized by the European Hockey Federation. It was held in Paris, France, from 12 to 23 June 1991.

Germany won their third title by defeating the two-time defending champions the Netherlands 3–1 in the final. England won the bronze medal by defeating the Soviet Union 2–1 in penalty strokes after the match finished 1–1 after extra time.

== Preliminary round ==
=== Pool A ===
Pos	Team	Pld	W	D	L	GF	GA	GD	Pts	Qualification
1	Netherlands	5	5	0	0	38	1	+37	10	Semi-finals
2	Soviet Union	5	4	0	1	15	6	+9	8	Semi-finals
3	France (H)	5	3	0	2	8	12	−4	6	
4	Poland	5	1	1	3	7	18	−11	3	
5	Switzerland	5	0	2	3	8	23	−15	2	
6	Italy	5	0	1	4	3	19	−16	1	

Source: TheSports.org
(H) Hosts

12 June 1991

Netherlands	9–0	Switzerland

12 June 1991

France	1–4	Soviet Union

13 June 1991

Poland	3–1	Italy

13 June 1991

France	0–6	Netherlands

14 June 1991

Soviet Union	2–0	Poland

14 June 1991

Switzerland	2–2	Italy

15 June 1991

Soviet Union	0–4	Netherlands

15 June 1991

France	3–2	Switzerland

16 June 1991

Netherlands	10–1	Poland

16 June 1991

France	2–0	Italy

17 June 1991

Switzerland	1–6	Soviet Union

18 June 1991

Switzerland	3–3	Poland

18 June 1991

Soviet Union	3–0	Italy

19 June 1991

Netherlands	9–0	Italy

19 June 1991

France	2–0	Poland

=== Pool B ===
Pos	Team	Pld	W	D	L	GF	GA	GD	Pts	Qualification
1	Germany	5	5	0	0	18	2	+16	10	Semi-finals
2	England	5	4	0	1	12	5	+7	8	Semi-finals
3	Spain	5	2	0	3	10	10	0	4	
4	Ireland	5	2	0	3	8	10	−2	4	
5	Belgium	5	2	0	3	7	13	−6	4	
6	Wales	5	0	0	5	6	21	−15	0	

Source: TheSports.org

12 June 1991

Wales	1–3	England

12 June 1991

Ireland	3–1	Spain

13 June 1991

Belgium	0–4	Germany

13 June 1991

England	3–1	Ireland

14 June 1991

Belgium	2–3	Spain

14 June 1991

Wales	0–6	Germany

15 June 1991

England	1–0	Spain

15 June 1991

Wales	1–3	Ireland

16 June 1991

England	3–0	Belgium

16 June 1991

Germany	3–0	Ireland

17 June 1991

Spain	6–2	Wales

18 June 1991

Wales	2–3	Belgium

18 June 1991

Spain	0–2	Germany

19 June 1991

Ireland	1–2	Belgium

19 June 1991

Germany	3–2	England

== Classification round ==
=== Ninth to twelfth place classification ===
9–12th place semi-finals
21 June
Italy	3
Belgium	4
21 June
Switzerland	0
Wales	2

Ninth place
23 June
Belgium	3
Wales	1
Eleventh place
23 June
Italy	1
Switzerland (a.e.t.)	2

==== 9–12th place semi-finals ====
21 June 1991

Italy	3–4	Belgium

21 June 1991

Switzerland	0–2	Wales

==== Eleventh place game ====
23 June 1991

Italy	1–2 (a.e.t.)	Switzerland

==== Ninth place game ====
23 June 1991

Belgium	3–1	Wales

=== Fifth to eighth place classification ===
5–8th place semi-finals
21 June
Ireland	2 (4)
France (p.s.o.)	2 (5)
21 June
Spain	2
Poland	0

Fifth place
23 June
France	0
Spain	1
Seventh place
23 June
Ireland	4
Poland	0

==== 5–8th place semi-finals ====
21 June 1991

Ireland	2–2 (a.e.t.)	France
Penalties
	4–5

21 June 1991

Spain	2–0	Poland

==== Seventh place game ====
23 June 1991

Ireland	4–0	Poland

==== Fifth place game ====
23 June 1991

France	0–1	Spain

=== First to fourth place classification ===
Semi-finals
21 June
England	1
Netherlands	2
21 June
Germany	4
Soviet Union	0

Final
23 June
Netherlands	1
Germany	3
Third place
23 June
England (p.s.o.)	1 (2)
Soviet Union	1 (1)

==== Semi-finals ====
21 June 1991

England	1–2	Netherlands

21 June 1991

Germany	4–0	Soviet Union

==== Third place game ====
23 June 1991

England	1–1 (a.e.t.)	Soviet Union
Penalties
	2–1

==== Final ====
23 June 1991

Netherlands	1–3	Germany

== Final standings ==
1. Germany
2. Netherlands
3. England
4. Soviet Union
5. Spain
6. France
7. Ireland
8. Poland
9. Belgium
10. Wales
11. Switzerland
12. Italy

== See also ==
- 1991 Women's EuroHockey Nations Championship
