= Poland men's national field hockey team =

Poland
- Association: Polish field hockey association (Polski Związek Hokeja na Trawie)
- Confederation: EHF (Europe)
- Head Coach: Dariusz Rachwalski
- Assistant coach(es): Tin Matković
- Manager: Patryk Karamuz
- Captain: Jacek Kurowski
| Home | Away |

FIH ranking
- Current: 24 ▼1 (19 December 2025)
- Highest: 16 (2004)
- Lowest: 28 (March – July 2023)

Olympic Games
- Appearances: 5 (first in 1952)
- Best result: 4th (1980)

World Cup
- Appearances: 6 (first in 1975)
- Best result: 8th (1982, 1986)

EuroHockey Championship
- Appearances: 14 (first in 1970)
- Best result: 5th (1974, 1978, 1987)

Poland men's national field hockey team represents Poland in international field hockey and is controlled by the Polish field hockey association, or in Polish: Polski Związek Hokeja na Trawie, also known as PZHT.

== Tournament record ==
=== Summer Olympics ===
Summer Olympics record
| Year | Round | Position | Pld | W | D | L | GF | GA | Squad |
|---|---|---|---|---|---|---|---|---|---|
| (United Kingdom) 1908 | did not participate | | | | | | | | |
| (Belgium) 1920 | did not participate | | | | | | | | |
| (Netherlands) 1928 | did not participate | | | | | | | | |
| (United States) 1932 | did not participate | | | | | | | | |
| (Germany) 1936 | did not participate | | | | | | | | |
| (United Kingdom) 1948 | did not participate | | | | | | | | |
| (Finland) 1952 | 5th place game | 6th | 5 | 2 | 1 | 2 | 6 | 13 | Squad |
| (Australia) 1956 | did not participate | | | | | | | | |
| (Italy) 1960 | Group stage | 12th | 4 | 1 | 1 | 2 | 3 | 12 | Squad |
| (Japan) 1964 | did not participate | | | | | | | | |
| (Mexico) 1968 | did not participate | | | | | | | | |
| (West Germany) 1972 | 11th place game | 11th | 8 | 3 | 2 | 3 | 19 | 16 | Squad |
| (Canada) 1976 | did not participate | | | | | | | | |
| (Soviet Union) 1980 | 3rd place game | 4th | 6 | 2 | 1 | 3 | 20 | 17 | Squad |
| (United States) 1984 | did not participate | | | | | | | | |
| (South Korea) 1988 | did not participate | | | | | | | | |
| (Spain) 1992 | did not qualify | | | | | | | | |
| (United States) 1996 | did not qualify | | | | | | | | |
| (Australia) 2000 | 12th place game | 12th | 7 | 1 | 2 | 4 | 16 | 20 | Squad |
| (Greece) 2004 | did not qualify | | | | | | | | |
| (China) 2008 | did not qualify | | | | | | | | |
| (United Kingdom) 2012 | did not qualify | | | | | | | | |
| (Brazil) 2016 | did not qualify | | | | | | | | |
| (Japan) 2020 | did not qualify | | | | | | | | |
| (France) 2024 | did not qualify | | | | | | | | |
| Total | Best: 4th | 5/25 | 30 | 9 | 7 | 14 | 64 | 78 | – |

=== Friendship Games ===
Field hockey at the Friendship Games record
| Year | Round | Position | Pld | W | D | L | GF | GA | Squad |
|---|---|---|---|---|---|---|---|---|---|
| (Soviet Union) 1984 | Final | 2nd | 3 | 1 | 1 | 1 | 3 | 6 | squad |
| Total | Best: 2nd | 2/8 | 3 | 1 | 1 | 1 | 3 | 6 | – |

=== World Cup ===
World Cup record
| Year | Round | Position | Pld | W | D * | L | GF | GA | Squad |
|---|---|---|---|---|---|---|---|---|---|
| (Spain) 1971 | did not participate | | | | | | | | |
| (Netherlands) 1973 | did not participate | | | | | | | | |
| (Malaysia) 1975 | 9th place game | 10th | 7 | 2 | 1 | 4 | 12 | 18 | Squad |
| (Argentina) 1978 | 9th place game | 9th | 8 | 3 | 1 | 4 | 17 | 25 | Squad |
| (India) 1982 | 7th place game | 8th | 7 | 2 | 0 | 5 | 9 | 17 | Squad |
| (England) 1986 | 7th place game | 8th | 7 | 2 | 1 | 4 | 10 | 17 | Squad |
| (Pakistan) 1990 | did not qualify | | | | | | | | |
| (Australia) 1994 | did not qualify | | | | | | | | |
| (Netherlands) 1998 | 11th place game | 12th | 7 | 0 | 1 | 6 | 10 | 32 | Squad |
| (Malaysia) 2002 | 15th place game | 15th | 9 | 2 | 1 | 6 | 13 | 21 | Squad |
| (Germany) 2006 | did not qualify | | | | | | | | |
| (India) 2010 | did not qualify | | | | | | | | |
| (Netherlands) 2014 | did not qualify | | | | | | | | |
| (India) 2018 | did not qualify | | | | | | | | |
| (India) 2023 | did not qualify | | | | | | | | |
| Total | Best: 8th | 6/15 | 45 | 11 | 5 | 29 | 71 | 130 | – |

=== European Championships ===
==== EuroHockey Championship ====
EuroHockey Championship record
| Year | Host | Position | Pld | W | D | L | GF | GA | Squad |
|---|---|---|---|---|---|---|---|---|---|
| 1970 | Brussels, Belgium | 7th | 6 | 2 | 2 | 2 | 7 | 7 | —N/a |
| 1974 | Madrid, Spain | 5th | 6 | 4 | 0 | 2 | 15 | 13 | —N/a |
| 1978 | Hanover, West Germany | 5th | 7 | 3 | 2 | 2 | 14 | 8 | —N/a |
| 1983 | Amstelveen, Netherlands | 9th | 7 | 2 | 1 | 4 | 7 | 14 | —N/a |
| 1987 | Moscow, Soviet Union | 5th | 7 | 4 | 0 | 3 | 14 | 13 | —N/a |
| 1991 | Paris, France | 8th | 7 | 1 | 1 | 5 | 7 | 24 | —N/a |
| 1995 | (Republic of Ireland) Dublin, Ireland | 6th | 7 | 3 | 1 | 3 | 14 | 16 | —N/a |
| 1999 | Padua, Italy | 9th | 7 | 3 | 0 | 4 | 22 | 20 | —N/a |
| 2003 | Barcelona, Spain | 8th | 7 | 2 | 1 | 4 | 9 | 16 | —N/a |
| 2005 | Leipzig, Germany | 7th | 5 | 1 | 1 | 3 | 8 | 8 | Squad |
| 2007 | Manchester, England | did not qualify | | | | | | | |
| 2009 | Amstelveen, Netherlands | 8th | 5 | 0 | 0 | 5 | 7 | 28 | Squad |
| 2011 | Mönchengladbach, Germany | did not qualify | | | | | | | |
| 2013 | Boom, Belgium | 7th | 5 | 1 | 0 | 4 | 9 | 26 | Squad |
| 2015 | London, England | did not qualify | | | | | | | |
| 2017 | Amstelveen, Netherlands | 8th | 5 | 0 | 1 | 4 | 6 | 23 | Squad |
| 2019 | Antwerp, Belgium | did not qualify | | | | | | | |
| 2021 | Amstelveen, Netherlands | did not qualify | | | | | | | |
| 2023 | Mönchengladbach, Germany | did not qualify | | | | | | | |
| 2025 | Mönchengladbach, Germany | 7th | 5 | 1 | 0 | 4 | 5 | 27 | Squad |
| 2027 | London, England | qualified | | | | | | | |
| Total | | 5th place | 86 | 27 | 10 | 49 | 144 | 243 | |

==== EuroHockey Championship II ====
EuroHockey Championship II record
| Year | Round | Position | Pld | W | D* | L | GF | GA |
|---|---|---|---|---|---|---|---|---|
| (Portugal) 2007 | Final | 1st | 5 | 4 | 0 | 1 | 23 | 9 |
| (Ukraine) 2011 | Final | 2nd | 5 | 3 | 1 | 1 | 12 | 4 |
| (Czech Republic) 2015 | Final | 1st | 5 | 5 | 0 | 0 | 13 | 4 |
| (France) 2019 | 3rd place match | 4th | 5 | 1 | 1 | 3 | 6 | 8 |
| (Poland) 2021 | 3rd place match | 4th | 5 | 2 | 1 | 2 | 9 | 8 |
| Total | 5/11 | 2 titles | 25 | 15 | 3 | 7 | 63 | 33 |

==== EuroHockey Championship III ====
EuroHockey Championship III record
| Year | Round | Position | Pld | W | D* | L | GF | GA |
|---|---|---|---|---|---|---|---|---|
| (Poland) 2023 | Final | 1st | 5 | 5 | 0 | 0 | 45 | 1 |
| Total | 1/11 | 1 title | 5 | 5 | 0 | 0 | 45 | 1 |

=== Hockey World League ===
Hockey World League record
| Season | Position | Round | Pld | W | D * | L | GF | GA |
|---|---|---|---|---|---|---|---|---|
| 2012–13 | 27th of 33 | Round 1 | 3 | 3 | 0 | 0 | 10 | 2 |
| 2012–13 | 27th of 33 | Round 2 | 5 | 1 | 1 | 3 | 16 | 21 |
| 2014–15 | 17th of 35 | Round 2 | 6 | 5 | 0 | 1 | 29 | 11 |
| 2014–15 | 17th of 35 | Semifinal | 5 | 1 | 0 | 4 | 6 | 15 |
| 2016–17 | 29th of 36 | Round 2 | 6 | 1 | 0 | 5 | 7 | 16 |
| Total | 17th (1x) | 3/3 | 25 | 11 | 1 | 13 | 68 | 65 |

=== FIH Hockey Nations Cup ===
Men's FIH Hockey Nations Cup record
| Season | Position | Round | Pld | W | D * | L | GF | GA |
|---|---|---|---|---|---|---|---|---|
| 2023–24 | 9th | Preliminary round | 4 | 1 | 0 | 3 | 5 | 8 |
| Total | 9th | 1/1 | 4 | 1 | 0 | 3 | 5 | 8 |

*Draws include knockout matches decided on a penalty shoot-out.

== Current squad ==
The following 18 players were named on 5 August 2025 for the 2025 EuroHockey Championship from 8 to 16 August 2025 in Mönchengladbach, Germany.

Caps updated as of 20 July 2025, after the match against Ireland.

| No. | Pos. | Player | Date of birth (age) | Caps | Club |
|---|---|---|---|---|---|
| 1 | GK | Mateusz Popiołkowski | 21 April 1994 (age 31) | 67 | (Poland) Politechnika Poznańska |
| 2 | | Mikołaj Głowacki | 18 March 1999 (age 26) | 47 | (Poland) Grunwald Poznań |
| 4 | | Tomasz Bembenek | 17 January 2000 (age 26) | 45 | (Germany) DTV Hannover |
| 7 | | Gracjan Jarzyński | 1 April 2001 (age 24) | 45 | (Germany) Harvestehuder THC |
| 8 | | Mikołaj Gumny | 22 November 1994 (age 31) | 102 | (Poland) Warta Poznań |
| 9 | | Jacek Kurowski (Captain) | 17 April 1998 (age 27) | 80 | (Germany) TSV Mannheim |
| 10 | DF | Maksymilian Koperski | 23 July 1999 (age 26) | 51 | (Netherlands) Oranje-Rood |
| 11 | | Damian Jarzembowski | 2 February 1997 (age 29) | 26 | (Poland) Grunwald Poznań |
| 12 | GK | Maciej Pacanowski | 21 September 1992 (age 33) | 74 | (Poland) Start Gniezno |
| 14 | | Robert Pawlak | 10 May 2003 (age 22) | 40 | (Poland) Politechnika Poznańska |
| 16 | | Jakub Janicki | 9 September 1996 (age 29) | 86 | (Poland) Gąsawa |
| 17 | | Patryk Pawlak | 19 November 1996 (age 29) | 62 | (Poland) AZS AWF Poznań |
| 21 | | Jakub Chumeńczuk | 24 November 2000 (age 25) | 32 | (Germany) Klipper THC |
| 22 | | Wojciech Rutkowski | 27 August 2000 (age 25) | 32 | (Poland) Pomorzanin Toruń |
| 23 | | Eryk Bembenek | 25 November 2001 (age 24) | 40 | (Germany) DTV Hannover |
| 24 | | Mateusz Nowakowski | 23 February 1998 (age 28) | 51 | (Germany) DTV Hannover |
| 26 | | Michał Kasprzyk | 22 August 1993 (age 32) | 84 | (Poland) Pomorzanin Toruń |
| 27 | | Michał Lange | 15 October 2000 (age 25) | 40 | (Poland) Grunwald Poznań |
| 28 | | Jakub Hołosyniuk | 3 March 2004 (age 22) | 28 | (Poland) Politechnika Poznańska |

=== Recent call-ups ===
The following players have been called up for the national team in the last 12 months.

| Pos. | Player | Date of birth (age) | Caps | Club | Latest call-up |
|---|---|---|---|---|---|
| | Karol Gumny | 24 June 2006 (age 19) | 8 | (Poland) Politechnika Poznańska | v. Ireland, 20 July 2025 |
| GK | Maksymilian Pawlak | 18 February 2005 (age 21) | 2 | (Germany) DHC Hannover | v. Ireland, 20 July 2025 |
| | Aleks Marcinkowski | 19 March 2005 (age 20) | 7 | (Poland) AZS AWF Poznań | 2024–25 FIH Hockey Nations Cup 2 |
| | Emil Witczak | 7 November 2005 (age 20) | 5 | (Poland) AZS AWF Poznań | 2024–25 FIH Hockey Nations Cup 2 |
| | Michał Wachowiak | 16 September 1991 (age 34) | 24 | (Poland) Warta Poznań | v. Scotland, 9 August 2024 |

== Results and fixtures ==
The following is a list of match results in the last 12 months, as well as any future matches that have been scheduled.

Win Draw Loss Fixture

=== 2026 ===
| 01 March 2026 WC Qualifiers GS | South Korea | 2–3 | Poland | Santiago, Chile |
| 14:15 | Lim 27'; Oh 45' | Report | Jarzyński 31', 51'; Lange 53' | Stadium: Estadio Nacional del Hockey Césped Claudia Schüler |

| 03 March 2026 WC Qualifiers GS | Canada | 1–2 | Poland | Santiago, Chile |
| 09:00 | Nicholson 60' | Report | Jarzyński 45'; Bembenek 56' | Stadium: Estadio Nacional del Hockey Césped Claudia Schüler |

| 04 March 2026 WC Qualifiers GS | Ireland | 4–1 | Poland | Santiago, Chile |
| 09:00 | Rowe 15'; Cole 21'; Walker 40'; Nelson 59' | Report | Rutkowski 52' | Stadium: Estadio Nacional del Hockey Césped Claudia Schüler |

| 06 March 2026 WC Qualifiers SF | France | 4–2 | Poland | Santiago, Chile |
| 17:15 | T. Clément 15'; Branicki 20'; Esmenjaud 21'; Sellier 36' | Report | T. Bembenek 22'; Rutkowski 34' | Stadium: Estadio Nacional del Hockey Césped Claudia Schüler |

| 08 March 2026 WC Qualifiers Third and fourth place | Poland | 1–2 | Wales | Santiago, Chile |
| 13:30 | Koperski 51' | Report | G. Furlong 22', 27' | Stadium: Estadio Nacional del Hockey Césped Claudia Schüler |

== See also ==
- Poland women's national field hockey team
