= Leszek Hensler =

Polish hockey player

Personal information
- Nationality: Polish
- Born: 4 February 1956 Gniezno, Poland
- Died: 3 June 2015 (aged 59) Poznań, Poland

Sport
- Sport: Field hockey

Leszek Hensler (4 February 1956 – 3 June 2015) was a Polish field hockey player. He competed in the men's tournament at the 1980 Summer Olympics.
