= Bernabé Izquierdo =

Cuban field hockey player

Personal information
- Nationality: Cuban
- Born: 11 June 1947 (age 78)

Sport
- Sport: Field hockey

Bernabé Izquierdo (born 11 June 1947) is a Cuban field hockey player. He competed in the men's tournament at the 1980 Summer Olympics.
