= Krystian Bąk =

Polish hockey player (born 1956)

Personal information
- Nationality: Polish
- Born: 20 September 1956 (age 69) Siemianowice, Poland

Sport
- Sport: Field hockey

Krystian Bąk (born 20 September 1956) is a Polish field hockey player. He competed in the men's tournament at the 1980 Summer Olympics.
