= Juan Caballero (field hockey) =

Cuban hockey player

Personal information
- Nationality: Cuban
- Born: 6 July 1951 (age 74)

Sport
- Sport: Field hockey

Juan Caballero (born 6 July 1951) is a Cuban field hockey player. He competed in the men's tournament at the 1980 Summer Olympics.
