= Hanuman Singh =

Indian basketball player

Personal information
- Born: 1950 Bhagwanpur, Nagaur, Rajasthan, India
- Listed height: 6 ft 0 in (1.83 m)
- Position: Guard

Career highlights
- Arjuna Award in 1975

Hanuman Singh Rathore is a noted former basketball player from India. He played for India in Asian Games, Commonwealth Games and at 1980 Olympics. He was awarded Arjuna Award in 1975. Born in 1950 in Nagaur district of Rajasthan state. He studied at Military School, Ajmer. He represented Indian Railways in national tournaments. He is now employed with SAIL.
