= Leszek Tórz =

Polish hockey player

Personal information
- Nationality: Polish
- Born: 12 April 1959 Poznań, Poland
- Died: 15 July 2018 (aged 59)

Sport
- Sport: Field hockey

Leszek Tórz (12 April 1959 – 15 July 2018) was a Polish field hockey player. He competed in the men's tournament at the 1980 Summer Olympics.
