= Lazaro Hernández =

Cuban hockey player

Personal information
- Nationality: Cuban
- Born: 3 February 1961 (age 65)

Sport
- Sport: Field hockey

Lazaro Hernández (born 3 February 1961) is a Cuban field hockey player. He competed in the men's tournament at the 1980 Summer Olympics.
