= Leszek Andrzejczak =

Polish hockey player

Personal information
- Nationality: Polish
- Born: 15 May 1959 (age 66) Poznań, Poland

Sport
- Sport: Field hockey

Leszek Andrzejczak (born 15 May 1959) is a Polish field hockey player. He competed in the men's tournament at the 1980 Summer Olympics.
