= José García (field hockey) =

Spanish field hockey player (born 1952)

Olympic medal record

Men's Field Hockey
Silver medal – second place	1980 Moscow	Team competition

José Miguel García Meseguer (born 29 September 1952) is a former field hockey player from Spain, who won the silver medal with the Men's National Team at the 1980 Summer Olympics in Moscow.
