= Jaime Zumalacárregui =

Spanish field hockey player (born 1956)

Olympic medal record

Men's Field Hockey
Silver medal – second place	1980 Moscow	Team competition

Jaime Zumalacárregui Benitez (born 7 September 1956) is a former field hockey player from Spain, who won the silver medal with the Men's National Team at the 1980 Summer Olympics in Moscow.
