= Ravinder Pal Singh =

Indian field hockey player (1960–2021)

Personal information
- Born: 6 September 1960 Sitapur, Uttar Pradesh, India
- Died: 8 May 2021 (aged 60) Lucknow, Uttar Pradesh, India
Medal record
Representing India
Men's field hockey
Olympic Games
Gold medal – first place	1980 Moscow	Team

Ravinder Pal Singh (6 September 1960 – 8 May 2021) was an Indian field hockey player and former banker. He was well known as a prominent centre-half during his playing days from 1979 to 1984. He was part of the Indian hockey team that won the gold medal in 1980 Summer Olympics at Moscow where India defeated Spain 4-3 in the final.

== Biography ==
He was born on 6 September 1960 in Sitapur, Uttar Pradesh. He was regarded as a person having the characteristics of an introvert according to his former teammates. He remained as a single throughout his lifetime and was survived by his niece Pragya Yadav. He graduated from the Lucknow Sports Hostel.

== Career ==
He was well known for his aggressive display in the field during his playing days and was referred to as a complete player by his teammates. He was also lauded for his quiet, calm and composed attitude on the field and also for his ball distribution.

Ravinder Pal Singh was part of the Indian team which competed at the 1979 Junior Hockey World Cup. He made his maiden Olympics appearance at the age of 20, representing India during the 1980 Summer Olympics and played a key role in India's triumph in the hockey tournament claiming the gold medal. He also eventually represented India at the 1984 Summer Olympics which was held in Los Angeles and was part of the Indian hockey team which finished in 5th position.

He also went on to feature at Hockey Champions Trophy on two occasions in 1980 and 1983 and also featured in the Indian team at the 1983 Silver Jubilee 10 Nation Cup in Hong Kong. He also made his maiden appearance in the Hockey World Cup tournament during the 1982 Men's Hockey World Cup in Mumbai, where India finished at 5th position. He was also part of Indian side which competed at the 1982 Men's Hockey Asia Cup in Karachi where India emerged as runners-up to hosts and arch-rivals Pakistan in the final.

He pursued his later career as a banker at the State Bank of India after retiring from international arena. He retired from playing field hockey because of a prolonged chronic spinal injury. He represented the State Bank of India hockey side in the Murugappa All India Invitation Hockey Tournament during the 1980s and 1990s, post international retirement. Ravinder Pal took voluntary retirement after serving at the State Bank of India for a brief period of time. He also played football during his leisure time at the KD Singh Stadium.

== Death ==
He died on 8 May 2021, at the age of 60 in Lucknow due to COVID-19. He was admitted at the Vivekananda Hospital on 24 April 2021, after testing positive for COVID-19. He had initially recovered from COVID-19 and was shifted to the non-COVID ICU ward on 6 May 2021, after testing negative for the virus. However, his condition deteriorated unexpectedly the very next day on 7 May 2021, and he was put on a ventilator.
