= Zbigniew Rachwalski =

Polish hockey player

Personal information
- Nationality: Polish
- Born: 21 September 1955 (age 70) Rogowo, Poland

Sport
- Sport: Field hockey

Zbigniew Rachwalski (born 21 September 1955) is a Polish field hockey player. He competed in the men's tournament at the 1980 Summer Olympics.
