= Juan Ríos (field hockey) =

Cuban hockey player

Personal information
- Nationality: Cuban
- Born: 25 December 1947 (age 78)

Sport
- Sport: Field hockey

Juan Ríos (born 25 December 1947) is a Cuban field hockey player. He competed in the men's tournament at the 1980 Summer Olympics.
