= Edgardo Vázquez =

Cuban field hockey player (born 1960)

Personal information
- Nationality: Cuban
- Born: 24 April 1960 (age 65)

Sport
- Sport: Field hockey

Edgardo Vázquez (born 24 April 1960) is a Cuban field hockey player. He competed in the men's tournament at the 1980 Summer Olympics.
