= Héctor Pedroso =

Cuban field hockey player

Personal information
- Nationality: Cuban
- Born: 22 January 1950 (age 76)

Sport
- Sport: Field hockey

Héctor Pedroso (born 22 January 1950) is a Cuban former field hockey player. He competed in the men's tournament at the 1980 Summer Olympics.
