= Juan Arbós =

Spanish field hockey player (born 1952)

Personal information
- Born: 12 November 1952 (age 73)
Medal record
Men's Field Hockey
Representing Spain
Olympic Games
Silver medal – second place	1980 Moscow	Team competition

Juan Arbós Perarnau (born 12 November 1952) is a former field hockey player from Spain. He won the silver medal with the Men's National Team at the 1980 Summer Olympics in Moscow.
