= Allan Schofield =

Indian field hockey player

Personal information
- Born: 26 January 1957 (age 69) Munnar, Kerala, India

Sport
- Sport: Field hockey
- Position: Goalkeeper
National team
Years	Team	Caps	Goals
1978–198?	India		-
Medal record
Men's Field Hockey
Representing India
Olympic Games
Gold medal – first place	1980 Moscow	Team
Asian Games
Silver medal – second place	1978 Bangkok	Team

Allan Schofield (born 26 January 1957) is a former Indian hockey player. He was part of the Indian hockey team that won the gold medal in 1980 Summer Olympics at Moscow.

== Early life and education ==
Schofield was born on 26 January 1957 in Munnar, Kerala, India, to George Schofield, an Irish tea planter and Grace Thomas, a Malayali from Kanjikkuzhi, Kottayam, as the fourth of their seven children. His Family left the tea estate and moved to Bangalore where he completed his schooling from Cathedral High School in 1974. He then joined the Indian Navy in Bombay (now Mumbai) in 1975. He is also an MBA graduate and lives in Canada.

== Career ==
Schofield was invited to join the Services football team after he volunteered to stand in as the goalkeeper in an inter-club match and excelled at it. A few months later, he was again called to volunteer as a goalkeeper for a hockey match where his performance earned him a spot in the Navy Junior team and within a year, he was called up to the Indian National Hockey team in 1976.

He was part of the squad that lost the 1978 Asian Games final to rivals Pakistan. Two years later, he was part of the 1980 Summer Olympics squad where the Indian national team captured their eighth Olympic gold medal. He was the second goalkeeper in the squad, with Bir Bahadur Chettri being the main goalkeeper and was fielded in one match. In January 1980, he played five out of six matches for the Indian senior team in the men's Champions Trophy at Karachi, Pakistan.
