= Dynamo Minor Arena =

Sports venue in Russia

Dinamo Minor Arena
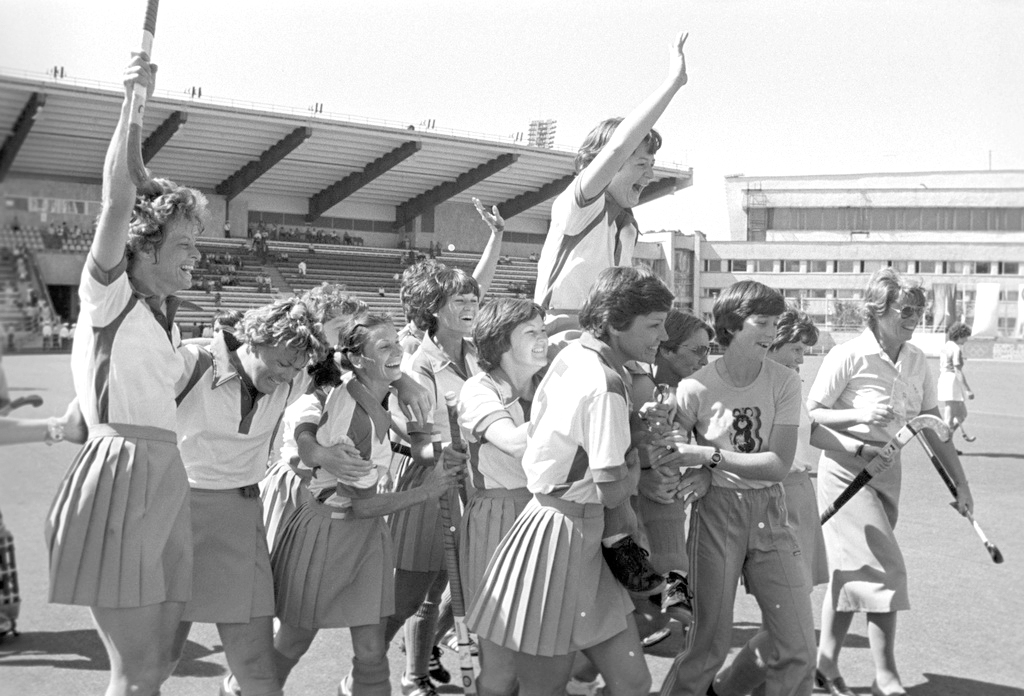
- Zimbabwe women's national field hockey team members celebrating at the 1980 Summer Olympics
- Location: Moscow, Russia
- Coordinates: 55.7906°N 37.5667°E
- Owner: Dynamo Moscow
- Capacity: 8,500
- Surface: Grass

Construction
- Built: 1928
- Renovated: 1979

Tenants
- Dynamo-D Moscow

The Dynamo Minor Arena is a sports venue in Moscow, Russia that is located near neighboring Central Dynamo Stadium.

Constructed in 1928, but renovated in 1979 in time for the 1980 Summer Olympics, it hosted the field hockey tournament.

The stadium is located in the Park of Sport Complex Dynamo along with Dynamo Grand Arena, Dynamo Manage (indoor field), Dynamo Hockey School, and other sports facilities.
