= Andrzej Myśliwiec =

Polish field hockey player

Personal information
- Nationality: Polish
- Born: 3 July 1957 (age 68) Katowice, Poland

Sport
- Sport: Field hockey

Andrzej Myśliwiec (born 3 July 1957) is a Polish field hockey player. He competed in the men's tournament at the 1980 Summer Olympics.
