= Jan Mielniczak =

Polish hockey player

Personal information
- Nationality: Polish
- Born: 11 December 1954 Poznań, Poland
- Died: 13 August 2016 (aged 61) Poznań

Sport
- Sport: Field hockey

Jan Mielniczak (11 December 1954 – 13 August 2016) was a Polish field hockey player. He competed in the men's tournament at the 1980 Summer Olympics.
