= Ajmer Singh Chopra =

Indian basketball player

Personal information
- Full name: Ajmer Singh Chopra
- Nationality: Indian
- Born: 1953 (age 72–73) Rukanpur, Karnal (Haryana)
- Height: 6 ft 5-in

Ajmer Singh Chopra (born 1953) is an Indian basketball player who was awarded the country's highest sporting honor, the Arjuna Award, in 1982. He represented the country in the Asian Basketball Championships and in the 1980 Summer Olympics in Moscow.

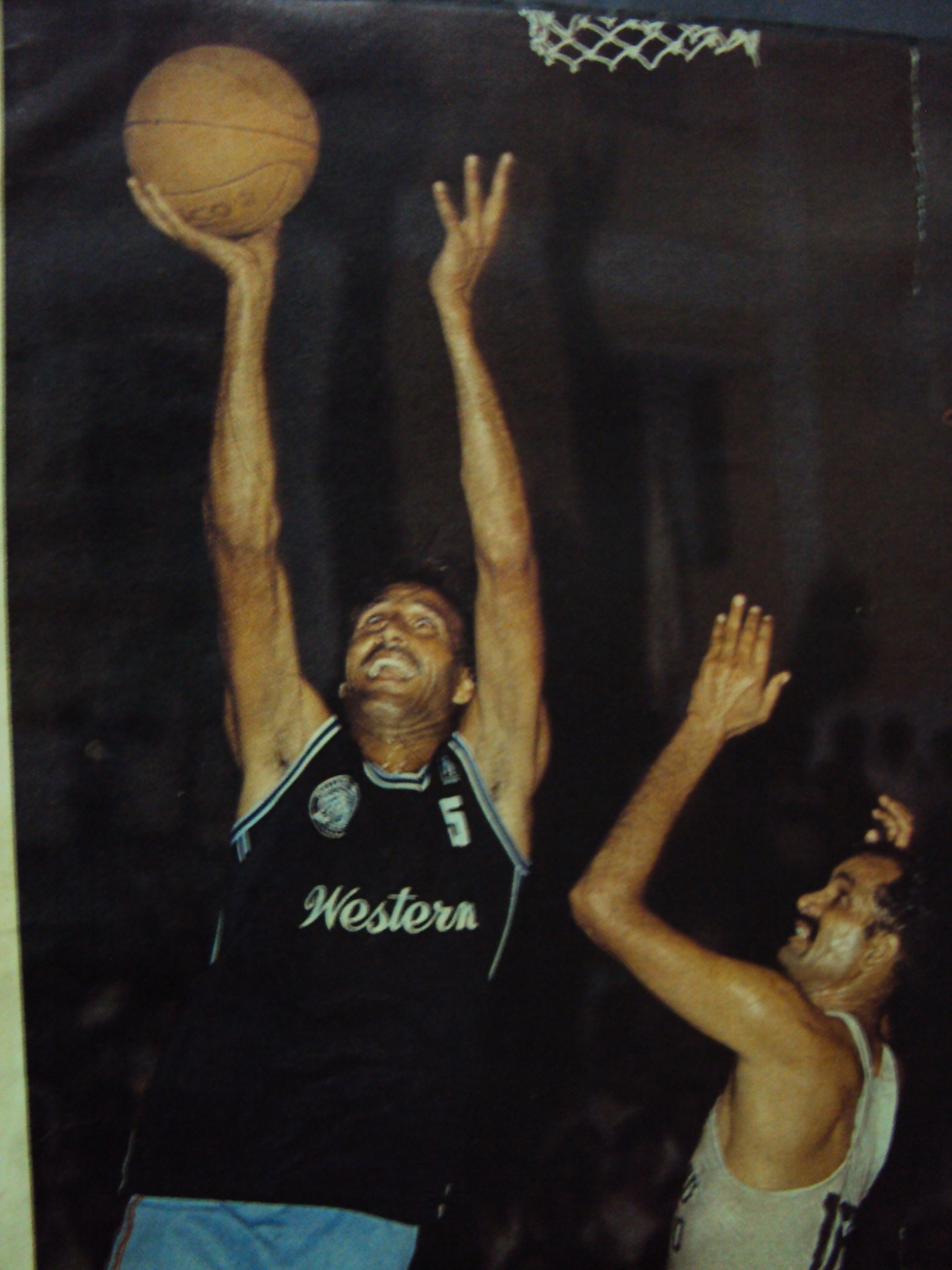
Ajmer Singh scoring a layup

According to The Hindu, Singh was "a rough and tough player and his sole aim was to score as many baskets as possible. A dedicated man, he was remarkable for his appetite for baskets. As a result, he emerged as one of the top 10 shooters in the 1980 Moscow Olympics."

== Sporting career ==
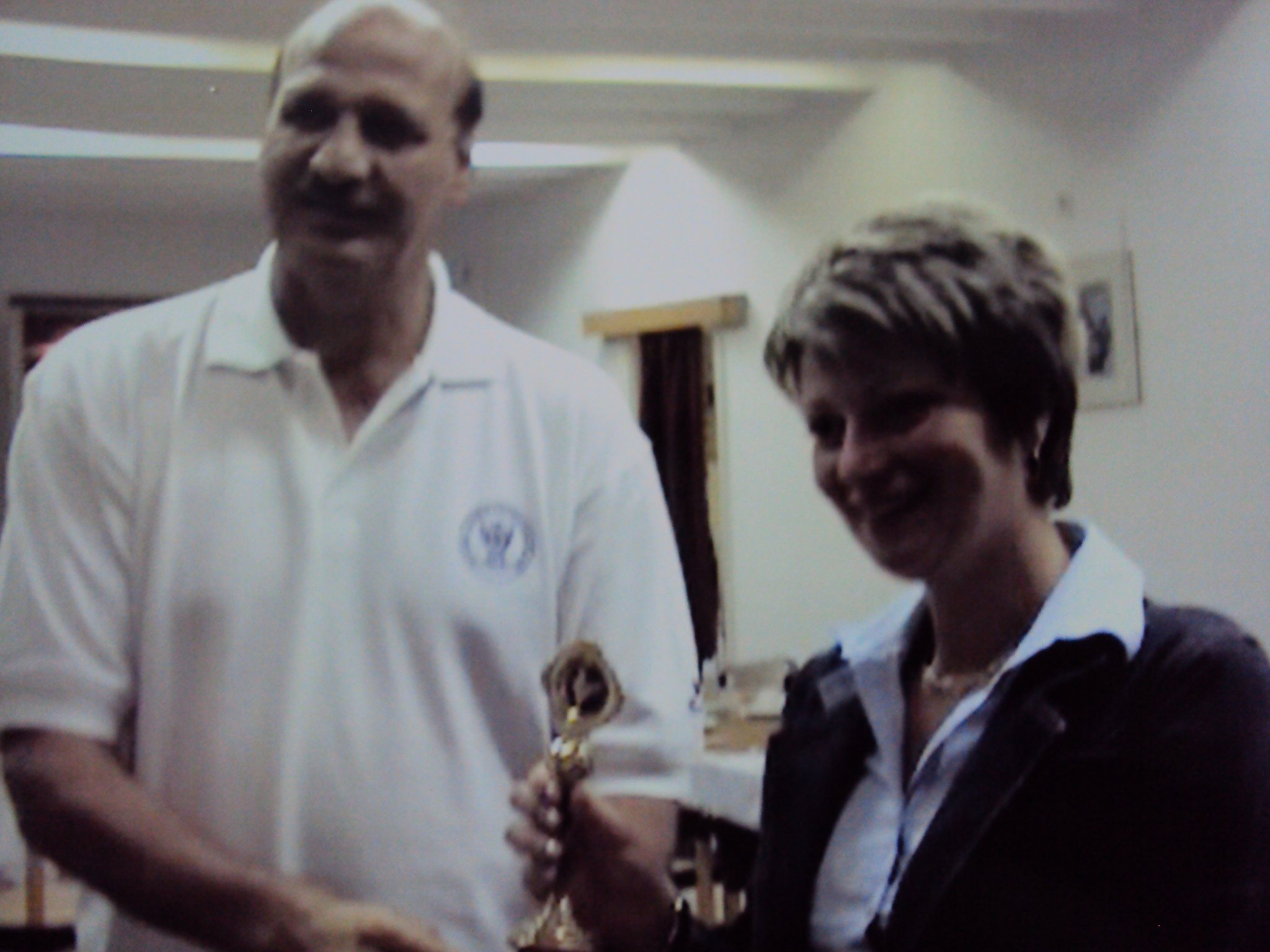
Ajmer Singh in a photo as head coach Indian Railways

Singh moved to Kota, which had a tradition in basketball. He played for the Rajasthan team and later moved to the Indian Railways team. The high point of his career was the Moscow Olympics where his performance was rated highly. His average per game at the 1980 Olympics was 21 points, with the next best scorer from the Indian team, Radhey Shyam, averaging 14 points. Singh scored nearly a third of India's points in the competition.

Ajmer has played a total of 22 national championships for Haryana, Rajasthan, and Railways, and finished with 8 gold medals. In 1982, he was conferred the Arjuna Award.
