= Henryk Horwat =

Polish field hockey player

Personal information
- Nationality: Polish
- Born: 9 February 1956 (age 70) Stalinogród, Polish People's Republic

Sport
- Sport: Field hockey

Henryk Horwat (born 9 February 1956) is a Polish field hockey player. He competed in the men's tournament at the 1980 Summer Olympics.
