= Jorge Mico =

Cuban hockey player

Personal information
- Nationality: Cuban
- Born: 19 September 1948 (age 77)

Sport
- Sport: Field hockey

Jorge Mico (born 19 September 1948) is a Cuban field hockey player. He competed in the men's tournament at the 1980 Summer Olympics.
