= Young Pioneers Stadium =

Former sports complex in Moscow, Russia

Coordinates: 55.784531°N 37.562267°E

The Young Pioneers Stadium (Russian: Стадион Юных пионеров) was a sports complex built in the Soviet Union, intended exclusively for children and youth training, the largest in Europe of this kind. It was located in Moscow. First built at the location in 1926 was a football stadium named after Mikhail Tomsky, used by FC Pishcheviki Moscow that had room for 13,000 spectators. Many other sports buildings were built around the stadium as part of a complex from 1932 to 1934 and included two volleyball grounds, five tennis courts, a cycling track, an indoor ice skating rink, as well as several indoor gyms and choreography halls. Besides that, an Indoor Athletics Area was built there in 1968. The site was reconstructed in 1980 to comply with Olympic standards and the football stadium (capacity 5,000) was used as a venue of the field hockey tournament at the 1980 Summer Olympics, including the final. After that, the complex was again the seat of the Central Children's Training and Competition Complex with more than 2,000 children regularly practicing sports.

In post-Soviet Russia, when many children's sports schools and sections around the country had been closed, the complex was used primarily for other purposes. It was demolished in 2016 to make way for a residential and commercial complex. At the time of its demolition, it is used by the Moscow Youth Football League.

== See also ==
- Vladimir Lenin All-Union Pioneer Organization
