= Paulino Monsalve =

Spanish field hockey player (1958–2024)

Olympic medal record

Men's Field Hockey
| Silver medal – second place | 1980 Moscow | Team competition |

Paulino Monsalve Ballesteros (30 October 1958 – 13 April 2024) was a Spanish field hockey player, who won the silver medal with the Spain men's national team at the 1980 Summer Olympics in Moscow. Monsalve died on 13 April 2024, at the age of 65.
