= Włodzimierz Stanisławski =

Polish hockey player

Personal information
- Nationality: Polish
- Born: 6 April 1956 (age 70) Rogowo, Poland

Sport
- Sport: Field hockey

Włodzimierz Stanisławski (born 6 April 1956) is a Polish field hockey player. He competed in the men's tournament at the 1980 Summer Olympics.
