= Santiago Malgosa =

Spanish field hockey player (born 1956)

Personal information
- Born: July 25, 1956 (age 69)
Medal record
Men's Field Hockey
Representing Spain
Olympic Games
Silver medal – second place	1980 Moscow	Team competition

Santiago Malgosa Morera (born July 25, 1956) is a former field hockey player from Spain, who won the silver medal with the Men's National Team at the 1980 Summer Olympics in Moscow.
