= Juan Coghen =

Spanish field hockey player (born 1959)

Olympic medal record

Men's Field Hockey
Silver medal – second place	1980 Moscow	Team competition

Juan Luis Coghen Alberdingk-Thijm (born 9 July 1959) is a former field hockey player from Spain who won the silver medal with the Men's National Team at the 1980 Summer Olympics of Moscow.
