= Aleksandr Sychyov =

Russian field hockey player

Olympic medal record

Men's Field Hockey
Bronze medal – third place	1980 Moscow	Team competition

Aleksandr Sychyov (Russian: Алекса́ндр Сычёв; born 10 October 1959) is a retired field hockey player from Russia, who won the bronze medal with the Men's National Field Hockey Team from the Soviet Union at the boycotted 1980 Summer Olympics in Moscow.
