= Rafael Garralda =

Spanish field hockey player (born 1956)

Olympic medal record

Men's Field Hockey
Silver medal – second place	1980 Moscow	Team competition

Rafael Garralda Garre (born 21 January 1956) is a former field hockey player from Spain. He won the silver medal with the Men's National Team at the 1980 Summer Olympics in Moscow.
