= Miguel Chaves =

Spanish field hockey player (born 1955)

Olympic medal record

Men's Field Hockey
Silver medal – second place	1980 Moscow	Team competition

Miguel Chaves Sánchez (born 10 February 1955) is a former field hockey player from Spain, who won the silver medal with the Men's National Team at the 1980 Summer Olympics in Moscow.
