= Francisco Fábregas Bosch =

Spanish field hockey player (born 1949)

Olympic medal record

Men's Field Hockey
Silver medal – second place	1980 Moscow	Team competition

Francisco Fábregas Bosch (born July 1, 1949 in Barcelona) is a former field hockey player from Spain, who won the silver medal with the Men's National Team at the 1980 Summer Olympics in Moscow. He competed in four Olympics for Spain, starting in 1968.
