= Juan Pellón =

Spanish field hockey player (born 1955)

Olympic medal record

Men's Field Hockey
Silver medal – second place	1980 Moscow	Team competition

Juan Pellón Fernández-Fontecha (born 21 January 1955) is a former field hockey player from Spain. He won the silver medal with the Men's National Team at the 1980 Summer Olympics in Moscow.

He is a brother of former tennis and field hockey player Beatriz Pellón.
