= Carlos Roca (field hockey) =

Spanish field hockey player (1958–2003)

Personal information
- Full name: Carlos Roca Portolés
- Born: 29 April 1958 Barcelona, Spain
- Died: 10 June 2003 (aged 45)
- Height: 170 cm (5 ft 7 in)
- Weight: 66 kg (146 lb)
Medal record
Men's Field Hockey
Representing Spain
Olympic Games
Silver medal – second place	1980 Moscow	Team competition

Carlos Roca Portolés (Note: In this Spanish name, the first or paternal surname is Roca and the second or maternal family name is Portolés.) (29 April 1958 – 10 June 2003) was a field hockey player from Spain who won the silver medal with the Men's National Team at the 1980 Summer Olympics in Moscow.
