= M. M. Somaya =

Indian field hockey player

Personal information
- Full name: Maneyapanda Muthanna Somaya
- Born: 8 May 1959 (age 67) Madikeri, Mysore State (now Karnataka), India

Sport
- Sport: Field hockey
- Position: Halfback
National team
Years	Team	Caps	Goals
–	India		-
Medal record
Men's field hockey
Olympic Games
Gold medal – first place	1980 Moscow	Team
Asian Games
Silver medal – second place	1982 Delhi	Team
Bronze medal – third place	1986 Seoul	Team
Champions Trophy
Bronze medal – third place	1982 Amstelveen	Team

Maneyapanda Muthanna Somaya (born 8 May 1959) is a former Indian field hockey player and was employed with Bharat Petroleum Corp Ltd. As a field hockey player, he was captain of the Indian national team and played as a halfback. He played in 3 Olympic Games in 1980, 1984 and 1988. He was a member of the Gold medal winning team in 1980 and captained the Indian team at the 1988 Seoul Olympics.

Somaya was a member of India squad that won the gold medal at the 1980 Moscow Olympics. He went on to play in two more Olympic Games — the 1984, and the 1988, captaining the side in the latter event. Somaya had a successful corporate career after his playing days with Bharat Petroleum. In 2007, he was bestowed the Life Time Achievement award by the Petroleum Sports Promotion Board. He is also a recipient of Arjuna Award.

== Biography ==
Somaya studied at St. Mary's School in Mumbai (then Bombay) and completed his college education in the city's St. Xavier's College. He credited the "Jesuit system of education, where they place equal focus on sports, academics and extra-curricular activities" for his career in sports. He was picked in the national squad for the 1980 Moscow Olympics.

In 1983, for the Silver Jubilee 10-Nation Cup in Hong Kong, Somaya was named captain.He was also captain of the Indian team at the 1985 Asia Cup, Dhaka. He captained the team that won the Peugeot Cup, Nairobi, 1988 and also led the team in the drawn India-Pak series in 1988. Somaya's only goal in the 1986 World Cup came against Spain in the group stage match.

Somaya was employed with Bharat Petroleum (BPCL) during his playing days, and after retirement, went through several programs from institutions such as Indian School of Business, Wharton School of the University of Pennsylvania and Arthur D. Little. He retired in 2017 as executive director of BPCL's aviation fueling and lubricant businesses.

== See also ==
- List of Indian hockey captains in Olympics
- Field hockey in India
