= Bir Bahadur Chettri =

Indian field hockey player

Olympic medal record

Men's Field Hockey

Olympic Games
Gold medal – first place	1980 Moscow	Team competition

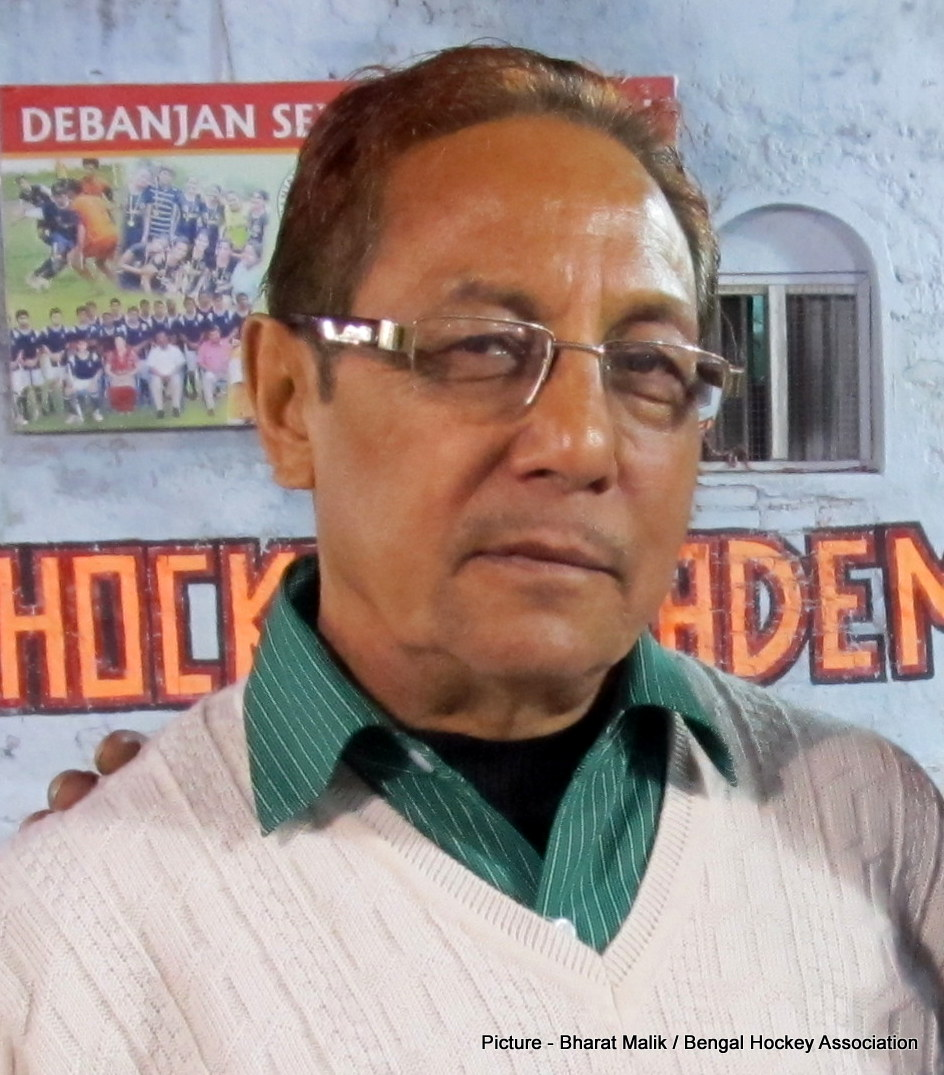

Bir Bhadur Chettri (born 7 December 1955) is an Indian field hockey player.

== Career ==
Chettri played for the national Indian field hockey team at the 1980 Summer Olympics in Moscow. He also played in the 1976 Summer Olympics in Montreal. In the preliminary rounds, India defeated Tanzania (18-0), Poland (2-0), Cuba (13-0), and the Soviet Union (4-2). They tied with Spain in the third round, but beat them in the finals with a score of 4-3, winning India the gold medal.
