= Vyacheslav Lampeyev =

Russian field hockey player

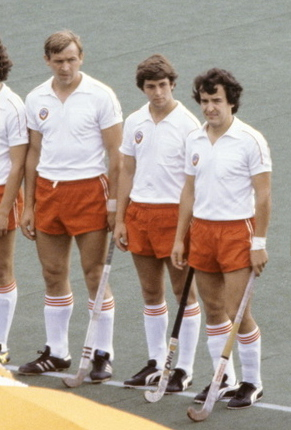
- Lampeyev (left) at the 1980 Olympics

Personal information
- Born: 3 January 1952 Ulyanovsk, Russia
- Died: 15 November 2003 (aged 51) Karasyovka, Ulyanovsk, Russia
- Height: 185 cm (6 ft 1 in)
- Weight: 89 kg (196 lb)

Sport
- Sport: Field hockey
- Club: Volga Ulyanovsk
Medal record
Representing Soviet Union
Olympic Games
Bronze medal – third place	1980 Moscow	Team

Vyacheslav Frolovich Lampeyev (Russian: Вячеслав Фролович Лампеев, 3 January 1952 – 15 November 2003) was a Russian field hockey defender. He was part of the Soviet team that won the bronze medal at the 1980 Olympics. He scored both goals in the bronze medal match against Poland, leading to a narrow 2–1 victory.

Lampeyev started as a bandy player, and since 1970s played bandy in winter and field hockey in summer for Volga Ulyanovsk. He won the Soviet field hockey title in 1970, 1971 and 1974, placing second in 1972 and third in 1976 and 1977. Between 1976 and 1980 he was a member of the national team. After retiring from competitions he worked as a bandy coach in his native Ulyanovsk. He died in 2003 when a fire broke out in his dacha due to a faulty stove. After his deaths an international junior bandy competition has been held in his honor.
