= Amarjit Singh Rana =

Indian field hockey player

Medal record

Men's field hockey

Representing India

Olympic Games
Gold medal – first place	1980 Moscow	Team competition

Amarjit Singh Rana (born 3 February 1960 at Khusropur, Punjab) is a former field hockey player from India. He was part of the Indian hockey team which won the gold medal in hockey in the 1980 Summer Olympics at Moscow.
