= Ricardo Cabot Boix =

Spanish field hockey player (1917–2014)

Ricardo Cabot Boix (12 January 1917 – 18 August 2014) was a Spanish field hockey player who competed in the 1948 Summer Olympics. He was a member of the Spanish field hockey team, which was eliminated in the group stage. He played one match as defender in the tournament.

His father Ricardo Cabot Montalt, who was known as a footballer, sports journalist, manager, and sports director, also played field hockey.
