= Charanjit Kumar =

Indian field hockey player

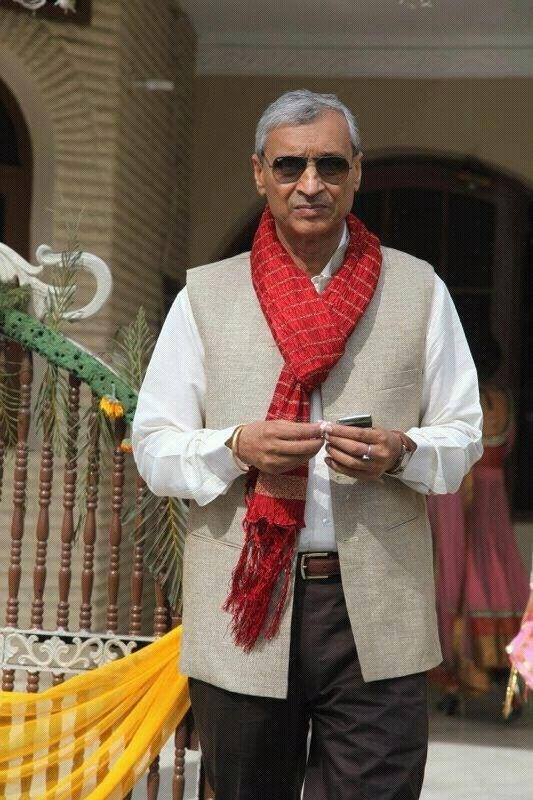
Olympic medal record Charanjit Kumar at his son's wedding.

Men's Field Hockey

Olympic Games
Gold medal – first place	1980 Moscow	Team

Asian Games
Silver medal – second place	1982 Delhi	Team

Champions Trophy
Bronze medal – third place	1982 Amstelveen	Team

Charanjit Kumar (born 11 April 1956) is a former Indian hockey player. He was part of the Indian hockey team that won the gold medal in 1980 Summer Olympics at Moscow. He was part of the Indian hockey team in 1984 Olympics
