= Maharaj Krishan Kaushik =

Indian field hockey player (1955–2021)

Olympic medal record

Men's field hockey

Olympic Games
| Gold medal – first place | 1980 Moscow | Team |

Maharaj Krishan Kaushik (2 May 1955 – 8 May 2021) was a member of the India men's national field hockey team and coach of the India women's national field hockey team.

== Biography ==
He was a member of the team when it won the gold medal at the 1980 Summer Olympics in Moscow. In 1998, he received the Arjuna Award. He also wrote the book The Golden Boot, with hockey writer K. Arumugam. For his coaching contribution to Indian hockey he received the Dronacharya Award in 2002. He died on 8 May 2021 to COVID-19 in New Delhi during the COVID-19 pandemic in India.

== Chak De India ==
Kaushik was involved in the development of the 2007 Bollywood film Chak De India. Its screenplay was written by Bollywood screenwriter Jaideep Sahni. Sahni had read a small article about the winning of the gold at the 2002 Commonwealth Games by the India women's national field hockey team and thought that the premise would make an interesting film. Hockey player Mir Ranjan Negi (who was accused of throwing the match against Pakistan during the 1982 Asian Games) has often been compared with Kabir Khan in the media.

Sahni further stated in an interview with The Hindu:

I felt why has the girls’ team been given so little coverage. I shared the idea with Aditya [Aditya Chopra]. He liked it and said stop everything else and concentrate on it. I started my research by spending time with hockey players [...] It’s just a matter of chance that Negi's story matches with Kabir Khan. There are many cases, like in Colombia, football players are killed for not performing well for the club. I had no idea about Negi’s story while writing the script, and he joined us after the script was ready. In fact, his name was suggested by M. K. Kaushik, who was the coach of the team that won the Commonwealth Games’ gold. On day one, when Negi read the script, he cried and it was then that we came to know about his story.

Sahni further noted that, "the story of Chak De was deeply inspired by the real life story of ex Chief National Coach Maharaj Krishan Kaushik and his Indian Women's hockey team's real feat of winning the Commonwealth and many other championships."

Both Kaushik and Negi did influence the development of the film after being approached by Sahni. Sahni first met with Kaushik and later recalled that, "M K Kaushik and his girls taught us all we knew about hockey. Then he recommended Negi to us, because when we finished writing and finished casting, we needed someone to train the girls. Negi assembled a team of hockey players to train the girls."

Kaushik also stated in the same interview, "I taught him everything about the game, starting from how the camp is conducted, how the girls come from different backgrounds and cultures, the psychological factors involved. Also how the coach faces pressure to select girls from different states and teams."

Sahni also contacted Negi and asked him to coach the actors portraying the hockey team. Negi agreed and trained both the girls and Shahrukh Khan for over four months.
