= Leonid Pavlovski =

Russian field hockey player

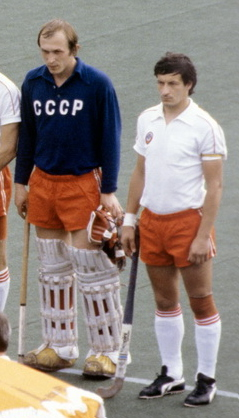
- Pavlovski (right) at the 1980 Olympics

Personal information
- Born: 29 May 1949 (age 77) Krasnoturyinsk, Russia
- Height: 175 cm (5 ft 9 in)
- Weight: 73 kg (161 lb)

Sport
- Sport: Field hockey
- Club: CSKA Sverdlovsk (1969–1983)
Medal record
Representing the Soviet Union
Olympic Games
Bronze medal – third place	1980 Moscow	Team

Leonid Viktorovich Pavlovski (Russian: Леонид Викторович Павловский, born 29 May 1949) is a retired Russian field hockey defender. He was the captain of the Soviet team that who the bronze medal at the 1980 Olympics in Moscow.

As most Soviet field hockey players of the 1970s Pavlovski competed both in bandy and field hockey, and won Soviet championships in both sports: in bandy in 1971 and 1974 and in field hockey in 1980. After retiring from competitions around 1983 he became the head coach of the Soviet and then Russian field hockey teams. Being a lifelong member of CSKA Sverdlovsk he was a career military officer holding the rank of lieutenant colonel.
