= Viktor Deputatov =

Russian field hockey player

Olympic medal record

Men's Field hockey
Bronze medal – third place	1980 Moscow	Team competition

Viktor Deputatov (born 10 May 1961) is a former field hockey player from the Soviet Union, who won the bronze medal with his national team at the boycotted 1980 Summer Olympics in Moscow. He also competed at the 1988 Summer Olympics in Seoul.
