= Ricardo Cabot (field hockey, born 1949) =

Personal information
- Born: 7 February 1949 (age 77)
Medal record
Men's Field Hockey
Representing Spain
Olympic Games
Silver medal – second place	1980 Moscow	Team competition

Ricardo Cabot Durán (born 7 February 1949 in Barcelona) is a former field hockey player from Spain, who won the silver medal with the Men's National Team at the 1980 Summer Olympics in Moscow. He competed in three consecutive Summer Olympics for Spain, starting in 1976.

Durán's grandfather Ricardo Cabot Montalt, who was better known for being a footballer, sports journalist, manager, and sports director, was the first in a family of field hockey players. Durán's father, Ricardo Cabot Boix, also played field hockey, competing for Spain in the 1948 Summer Olympics. His younger brother, Javier Cabot Durán is a former field hockey player as well, and the two brothers played together in the Spanish national team that won the silver medal at the 1980 Summer Olympics in Moscow.
