= Vladimir Pleshakov =

Russian field hockey player

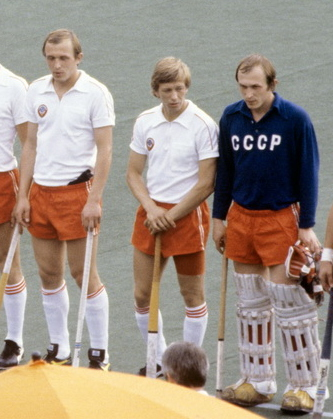
- Sergei (left) and Vladimir Pleshakov (right) at the 1980 Olympics

Personal information
- Born: 2 November 1957 (age 68) Syzran, Russian SFSR, Soviet Union
- Height: 182 cm (6 ft 0 in)
- Weight: 82 kg (181 lb)

Sport
- Sport: Field hockey
- Club: Torpedo Syzran (1975–1977); SKA Sverdlovsk (1977–1998)
Medal record
Representing Soviet Union
Olympic Games
Bronze medal – third place	1980 Moscow	Team

Vladimir Mikhailovich Pleshakov (Russian: Владимир Михайлович Плешаков, born 2 November 1957) is a retired Russian field hockey goalkeeper. Together with his twin brother Sergei he competed in the 1980, 1988 and 1992 Summer Olympics and won a bronze medal in 1980.

In 1975 Pleshakov started playing for the club Torpedo Syzran, but in 1977 moved to SKA Sverdlovsk, where he was serving with the Soviet Army. He retired in 1994 to become a coach of SKA Sverdlovsk. The team was disbanded in 1998, and Pleshakov became an association football administrator.
