= Davinder Singh (field hockey) =

Indian field hockey player (1952–2026)

Olympic medal record

Men's field hockey

Olympic Games
Gold medal – first place	1980 Moscow	Team competition

Davinder Singh Garcha (7 December 1952 – 10 January 2026) was an Indian hockey player. He was part of the Indian hockey team that won the gold medal in the 1980 Summer Olympics where he scored 8 goals in total of 6 Olympic matches and played more than 30 international matches playing just three tournaments scoring 19 goals. Singh died on 10 January 2026, at the age of 73.
