= Sergei Klevtsov =

Russian field hockey player

Olympic medal record

Men's Field hockey
Bronze medal – third place	1980 Moscow	Team competition

Sergei Klevtsov (born 30 January 1954) is a former field hockey player from Russia, who won the bronze medal with the Men's National Field Hockey Team from the Soviet Union at the 1980 Summer Olympics in Moscow.
