= Aleksandr Myasnikov =

Russian field hockey player

Personal information
- Born: 8 May 1959 (age 67) Syzran, Kuybyshev Oblast, Russian SFSR, Soviet Union
Medal record
Men's Field Hockey
Representing Soviet Union
Olympic Games
Bronze medal – third place	1980 Moscow	Team competition

Aleksandr Ivanovich Myasnikov (born 8 May 1959) is a retired field hockey player from Russia, who won the bronze medal with the Men's National Field Hockey Team from the Soviet Union at the 1980 Summer Olympics in Moscow. He represented the Soviet Union again at the 1988 Summer Olympics in Seoul.
