= Sylvanus Dung Dung =

Indian field hockey player (born 1949)

Olympic medal record

Men's field hockey

Olympic Games
| Gold medal – first place | 1980 Moscow | Team |

Asian Games
| Silver medal – second place | 1978 Bangkok | Team |

Sylvanus Dung Dung (born 27 January 1949) is a former field hockey player from Simdega, Jharkhand, India. He received the Dhyan Chand Award in 2016.
