= Sos Hayrapetyan =

Field hockey player

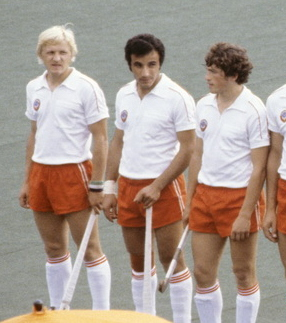
- Hayrapetyan (center) at the 1980 Olympics

Personal information
- Born: 12 September 1959 (age 66) Yerevan, Armenian SSR, Soviet Union
- Height: 176 cm (5 ft 9 in)
- Weight: 76 kg (168 lb)

Sport
- Sport: Field hockey
- Club: SKA Sverdlovsk (1978–1980); Dynamo Alma-Ata (1981–1987); Hrazdan (1988–1992); Uhlenhorster HC (1992–2004)
Medal record
Representing the Soviet Union
Olympic Games
Bronze medal – third place	1980 Moscow	Team
Intercontinental Cup
Gold medal – first place	1981 Kuala Lumpur	Team
European championships
Silver medal – second place	1983 Amsterdam	Team

Sos Hayrapetyan (also Airapetian, Armenian: Սոս Հայրապէտյան, born 12 September 1959) is a retired field hockey defender from Armenia. He won four Soviet Cups (1982, 1983, 1986, 1987), eight Soviet championships (1980–1987), two European Cups (1982, 1983) and one Intercontinental Cup (1981), and medaled at the 1980 Summer Olympics and 1983 European Championship. Hayrapetyan was named an Honoured Master of Sports of the USSR in 1984. His son Levon is an association football player.

== Biography ==
Hayrapetyan first trained in football and took up field hockey only in 1976. Within a few years, he had grown into one of the leading Soviet players. He started his club career in 1978 with SKA Sverdlovsk. In 1978 and 1979, he placed second at the Soviet championships, and in 1980 won the title. From 1981 to 1987, he played for Dynamo Alma-Ata and from 1988 to 1992 for Hrazdan.

From 1978 to 1991, Hayrapetyan was part of the Soviet national team. He won an Olympic bronze medal in 1980, the Intercontinental Cup in 1981, and a silver medal at the 1983 European Championships, losing the final in the penalty shootout. Soviet Union boycotted the 1984 Summer Olympics, and Hayrapetyan competed at the Friendship Games instead, where the Soviet team came in first place. All team members were awarded the title of Honored Master of Sports for their victory. Hayrapetyan later competed in the 1988 and 1992 Summer Olympics and finished seventh and tenth, respectively.

In 1992, Hayrapetyan moved to the German city of Hamburg, and from 1992 to 2004 played for Uhlenhorster HC. In 2004, after winning silver medals at the club championship in Germany, he retired and became a field hockey coach. He also helped in training his son, the national player of the Armenia national football team Levon Hayrapetyan.
