= Minneula Azizov =

Russian field hockey player (born 1951)

Olympic medal record

Men's Field hockey
Bronze medal – third place	1980 Moscow	Team competition

Minneula Azizov (born 23 June 1951) is a retired field hockey player from Russia, who won the bronze medal with the Men's National Field Hockey Team from the Soviet Union at the 1980 Summer Olympics in Moscow.
