= Aleksandr Goncharov =

Field hockey player

Olympic medal record

Men's Field Hockey
Bronze medal – third place	1980 Moscow	Team competition

Aleksandr Goncharov (Russian: Александр Гончаров; 27 March 1959 – 19 June 1990) was a field hockey player from the Soviet Union, who won the bronze medal with his national team at the boycotted 1980 Summer Olympics in Moscow, behind India (gold) and Spain (silver).
