= Mervyn Fernandis =

Indian field hockey player

Personal information
- Born: 12 April 1959 (age 67) Ambernath
- Height: 5 ft 7 in (170 cm)

Sport
- Sport: Field hockey
- Position: Inside Right
Senior career
Years	Team	Caps	Goals
–	Indian Airlines	-	-
National team
Years	Team	Caps	Goals
–	India		-
Medal record
Men's Field Hockey
Representing India
Olympic Games
Gold medal – first place	1980 Moscow
Asian Games
Silver medal – second place	1978 Bangkok	Team
Silver medal – second place	1982 Delhi	Team
Champions Trophy
Bronze medal – third place	1982 Amstelveen

Mervyn Fernandis (born 12 April 1959) is a former Indian hockey player. Mervyn played for the famous Indian Airlines hockey team in the 1970s. His name become synonymous with Indian hockey. He was a consistent performer for the Indian team. Mervyn with his body-serve and excellent finish was an exceptional forward. He was part of the Indian hockey team that won the gold medal in 1980 Summer Olympics at Moscow.

His father, Joe Fernandes, was the coach in P.M.M Inner wheel school (Ambernath) for a very long period of time before retiring few years ago due to old age.
