= Oleg Zagorodnev =

Russian field hockey player (born 1959)

Olympic medal record

Men's Field hockey
Bronze medal – third place	1980 Moscow	Team competition

Oleg Zagorodnev (born 7 July 1959) is a former field hockey player from Russia, who won the bronze medal with the Men's National Field Hockey Team from the Soviet Union at the boycotted 1980 Summer Olympics in Moscow.
