= Surinder Singh Sodhi (field hockey) =

Indian field hockey player

Olympic medal record

Men's field hockey

Olympic Games
Gold medal – first place	1980 Moscow	Team competition

Asian Games
Silver medal – second place	1978 Bangkok	Team

Champions Trophy
Bronze medal – third place	1982 Amstelveen	

Surinder Singh Sodhi (born 22 June 1957) is a former field hockey player from India. He is famous for playing a major role in getting India the gold medal in the 1980 Olympic games after a gap of 16 years. He played in the center forward position.

In previous games, Surinder Singh Sodhi scored 5 goals against Tanzania and 4 against Cuba.

The 15 goals he scored in the 1980 Moscow Olympics are the second-highest goals and the highest tally by an Indian in an Olympic hockey competition. It surpassed the earlier record of 14 goals set by the great Udham Singh in the 1956 Melbourne Olympics. He was awarded Arjuna Award and Maharaja Ranjit Singh Award and is a former I.G Of Police (IPS Officer) and was also awarded a police medal for Meritorious Services in 1994.

In 2022, he ran for the Jalandhar Cantonment Assembly constituency seat as the Aam Aadmi Party's candidate, losing to Pargat Singh.
