= Aleksandr Gusev (field hockey) =

Soviet field hockey player

Personal information
- Born: 21 February 1955 Sredneuralsk, Sverdlovsk Oblast, RSFSR, Soviet Union
- Died: 24 November 1994 (aged 39) Sredneuralsk, Sverdlovsk Oblast, Russia
Medal record
Men's field hockey
Representing Soviet Union
Olympic Games
| Bronze medal – third place | 1980 Moscow | Team competition |

Aleksandr Petrovich Gusev (Russian: Алекса́ндр Петро́вич Гу́сев; 21 February 1955 – 24 November 1994) was a field hockey player from the Soviet Union, who won the bronze medal with his national team at the boycotted 1980 Summer Olympics in Moscow, behind India and Spain.
