= Valeri Belyakov =

Russian field hockey player (born 1953)

Olympic medal record

Men's Field hockey
Bronze medal – third place	1980 Moscow	Team competition

Valeri Belyakov (born 13 April 1953) was a field hockey player from the Soviet Union whose team won the bronze medal at the 1980 Summer Olympics in Moscow, behind India (gold) and Spain.
