= Sergei Pleshakov =

Russian field hockey player

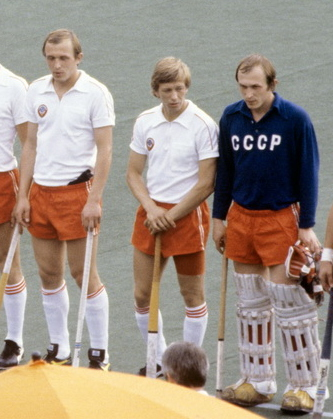
- Sergei (left) and Vladimir Pleshakov (right) at the 1980 Olympics

Personal information
- Born: 2 November 1957 Syzran, Russian SFSR, Soviet Union
- Died: 29 May 2018 Yekaterinburg, Russian Federation
- Height: 182 cm (6 ft 0 in)
- Weight: 80 kg (176 lb)

Sport
- Sport: Field hockey
- Club: Torpedo Syzran (1975–1977); SKA Sverdlovsk (1977–1998)
Medal record
Representing Soviet Union
Olympic Games
Bronze medal – third place	1980 Moscow	Team

Sergei Mikhailovich Pleshakov (Russian: Сергей Михайлович Плешаков, 2 November 1957 — 29 May 2018) was a retired Russian field hockey defender. Together with his twin brother Vladimir he competed in the 1980, 1988 and 1992 Summer Olympics and won a bronze medal in 1980.

In 1975 Pleshakov started playing for the club Torpedo Syzran, but in 1977 moved to SKA Sverdlovsk, where he was serving with the Soviet Army. He retired in 1994 to become a coach of SKA Sverdlovsk. The team was disbanded in 1998, and Pleshakov became an association football administrator.
