= Mikhail Nichepurenko =

Russian field hockey player (born 1955)

Olympic medal record

Men's Field hockey
Bronze medal – third place	1980 Moscow	Team competition

Mikhail Ivanovich Nichepurenko (Russian: Михаил Иванович Ничепуренко; born 27 December 1955 in Novokuybyshevsk, Kuybyshev Oblast) is a retired field hockey player from Russia, who won the bronze medal with the Men's National Field Hockey Team from the Soviet Union at the boycotted 1980 Summer Olympics in Moscow.
