= Central Dynamo Stadium =

Home ground for Dynamo Moscow

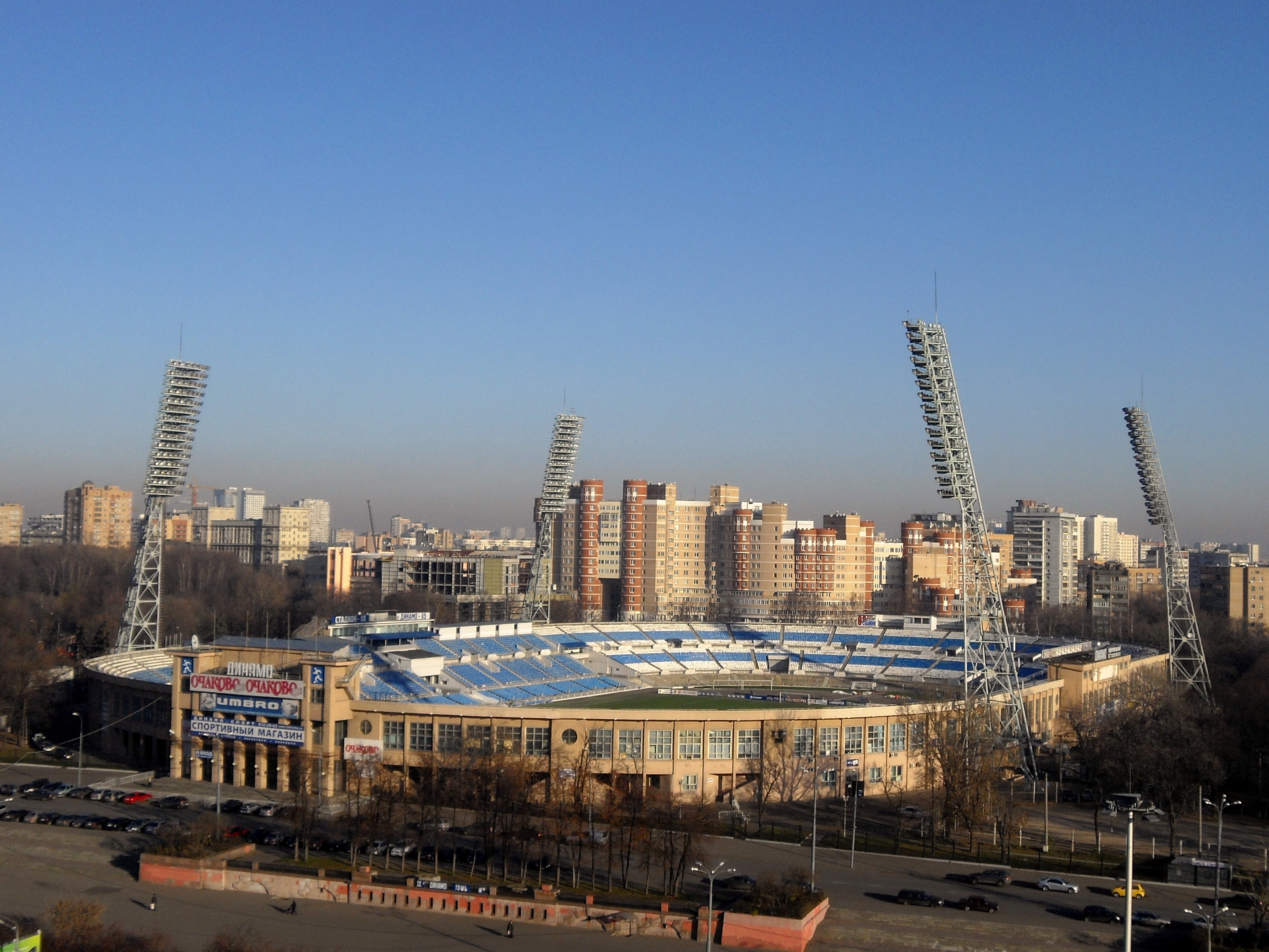
- Central Dynamo Stadium in November 2008
- Interactive map of Central Dynamo Stadium
- Location: Moscow, Russia
- Coordinates: 55°47′29″N 37°33′35″E
- Capacity: 36,540
- Field size: 105 m × 68 m (344 ft × 223 ft)

Construction
- Built: 17 August 1928
- Closed: 2008
- Demolished: 2011
- Architects: Aleksandr Langman and Lazar Cherikover

Tenants
- Dynamo Moscow (1928–2008); Soviet national football team (1928–1956)

Central Dynamo Stadium was a stadium in Moscow, Russia. It was built in 1928 and held 36,540 people. It was the home ground for Dynamo Moscow. It was central venue of the All-Soviet Dynamo sports society and carried special name of Central to denote its importance. Until the construction of the Central Lenin Stadium in 1956, the Central Dynamo Stadium was the central sports facility in Moscow. The stadium was one of the venues of the football tournament of the 1980 Summer Olympics.

A new stadium was built on the same spot and is named the VTB Arena.

== History ==
Dynamo Stadium, designed by the architects Arkadiy Langman and Lazar Cherikover, dates from 1928. In 1938, the Dinamo station of the Moscow Metro opened nearby. An athletics track circles the football field, but is no longer in use. A monument to Lev Yashin (1929–1990) stands at the stadium's north entrance and VIP boxes are positioned above the entrances to the north and south stands. In 2008, the stadium celebrated its 80-year anniversary.

Michael Jackson brought his HIStory World Tour to the Dynamo Stadium in 1996 and Deep Purple performed there the same year.

Dynamo Stadium closed for demolition in 2008, with the farewell match played on 22 November 2008. The stadium's main tenant, Dynamo Moscow, moved to the Arena Khimki, a stadium in the Moscow suburb of Khimki.

== Highlights ==
- Size of field: 105 m × 68 m (344 ft × 223 ft)
- Capacity – 36,540
- Field surface – natural grass
- Dimensions board: 28 m × 8.5 m (92 ft × 28 ft)
- Lighting: 1400 lux (4 lighting towers)
- Scoreboard – one on the western platform, electronic

== See also ==
- Glasnost Bowl
