= Farit Zigangirov =

Russian field hockey player (1954–2026)

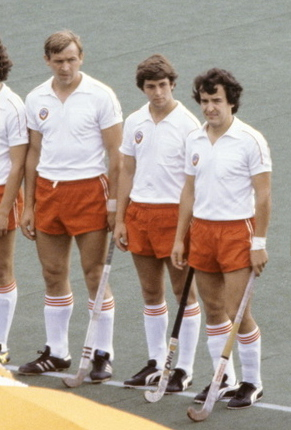
- Zigangirov (right) at the 1980 Olympics

Personal information
- Born: 15 August 1954 Kirov, Kirov Oblast, Russian SFSR, Soviet Union
- Died: 20 August 2026 (aged 72)
- Height: 174 cm (5 ft 9 in)
- Weight: 74 kg (163 lb)

Sport
- Sport: Field hockey
- Club: Dynamo Almaty
Medal record
Representing the Soviet Union
Olympic Games
Bronze medal – third place	1980 Moscow	Team
European championships
Silver medal – second place	1983 Amsterdam	Team

Farit Nurgaliyevich Zigangirov (Russian: Фарит Нургалиевич Зигангиров; Tatar: Фәрит Нургали улы Җиһангиров, Färit Nurğali ulı Cihangirow; 15 August 1954 – 20 August 2026) was a Soviet Tatar field hockey player who won a bronze medal at the 1980 Olympics in Moscow.

Zigangirov was the youngest child in a family of seven siblings. During his sports career he moved between several cities in Russia and Kazakhstan, where he settled after retiring in 1987. After the 1980 Olympics he became the captain of the Soviet field hockey team and led it to the second place at the 1983 European Championships and fourth place at the 1986 World Championships. In retirement he worked as a coach with Dynamo Almaty.

Zigangirov died on 20 August 2026, at the age of 72.
