= Czechoslovakia at the 1980 Summer Olympics =

- IOC code: TCH
- NOC: Czechoslovak Olympic Committee

in Moscow
- Competitors: 209 (162 men and 47 women) in 21 sports
- Flag bearer: Vítězslav Mácha
- Medals Ranked 13th: Gold 2 Silver 3 Bronze 9 Total 14

Summer Olympics appearances (overview)
- 1920; 1924; 1928; 1932; 1936; 1948; 1952; 1956; 1960; 1964; 1968; 1972; 1976; 1980; 1984; 1988; 1992

Other related appearances
- Bohemia (1900–1912); Czech Republic (1994–pres.); Slovakia (1994–pres.)

Czechoslovakia competed at the 1980 Summer Olympics in Moscow, USSR. 209 competitors, 162 men, and 47 women, took part in 114 events in 21 sports.

== Medalists ==
Medal	Name	Sport	Event
Gold	Ota Zaremba	Weightlifting	Men's 100 kg
Gold	Czechoslovakia national football team: Stanislav Seman; Luděk Macela; Josef Mazura; Libor Radimec; Zdeněk Rygel; Petr Němec; Ladislav Vízek; Jan Berger; Jindřich Svoboda; Lubomír Pokluda; Werner Lička; Rostislav Václavíček; Jaroslav Netolička; Oldřich Rott; František Štambacher; František Kunzo	Football	Men's competition
Silver	Imrich Bugár	Athletics	Men's discus throw
Silver	Jarmila Kratochvílová	Athletics	Women's 400 m
Silver	Czechoslovakia women's national field hockey team: Milada Blažková; Jiřina Čermáková; Jiřina Hájková; Berta Hrubá; Ida Hubáčková; Jiřina Kadlecová; Jarmila Králíčková; Jiřina Křížová; Alena Kyselicová; Jana Lahodová; Květa Petříčková; Viera Podhányiová; Iveta Šranková; Marie Sýkorová; Marta Urbanová; Lenka Vymazalová	Field hockey	Women's tournament
Bronze	Ján Franek	Boxing	Men's light middleweight
Bronze	Jiří Tabák	Gymnastics	Men's rings
Bronze	Vladimír Kocman	Judo	Men's +95 kg
Bronze	Dušan Poliačik	Weightlifting	Men's 82.5 kg
Bronze	Dan Karabin	wrestling	Men's freestyle 74 kg
Bronze	Július Strnisko	wrestling	Men's freestyle 100 kg
Bronze	Zdeněk Pecka; Václav Vochoska	Rowing	Men's double sculls
Bronze	Teodor Černý; Martin Penc; Jiří Pokorný; Igor Sláma	Cycling	Men's team pursuit
Bronze	Michal Klasa; Vlastibor Konečný; Alipi Kostadinov; Jiří Škoda	Cycling	Men's team time trial

== Archery ==
In its first appearance in the Olympic archery competition, Czechoslovakia sent two women and one man. Zdeňka Padevětová earned a fourth-place finish.
Women's Individual Competition:

- Zdeňka Padevětová — 2405 points (→ 4th place)
- Jitka Dolejší — 2219 points (→ 20th place)

Men's Individual Competition:

- František Hadaš — 2305 points (→ 24th place)

== Athletics ==
Men's 1,500 metres

- Jozef Plachý
  - Heat — 3:44.4
  - Semifinals — 3:40.4
  - Final — 3:40.7 (→ 6th place)

Men's 5,000 metres

- Jiří Sýkora
  - Heat — 13:43.1
  - Semi Final — 13:31.0
  - Final — 13:25.0 (→ 9th place)

Men's 10,000 metres

- Jiří Sýkora
  - Heat — 29:19.8 (→ did not advance)

Men's Marathon

- Vlastimil Zwiefelhofer
  - Final — did not finish (→ no ranking)
- Josef Janska
  - Final — did not finish (→ no ranking)

Men's 4 × 400 metres Relay

- Josef Lomický, Dušan Malovec, František Břečka, and Karel Kolář
  - Heat — 3:03.5
  - Final — 3:07.0 (→ 7th place)

Men's 110 m Hurdles

- Július Ivan
  - Final — did not finish (→ no ranking)

Men's 3,000 m Steeplechase

- Dušan Moravčík
  - Heat — 8:33.4
  - Semifinals — 8:28.0
  - Final — 8:29.1 (→ 10th place)

Men's Long Jump

- Jan Leitner
  - Qualification — 7.68 m (→ did not advance)

Men's Discus Throw

- Imrich Bugár
  - Qualification — 65.08 m
  - Final — 66.38 m (→ Silver Medal)

Men's Hammer Throw

- Jiří Chamrád
  - Qualification — 69.38 m
  - Final Round — 68.16 m (→ 12th place)

Men's Shot Put

- Jaromír Vlk
  - Qualification — 19.69 m
  - Final — 20.24 m (→ 7th place)

Men's 20 km Walk

- Pavol Blažek
  - Final — 1:35:30.8 (→ 14th place)
- Jozef Pribilinec
  - Final — 1:42:52.4 (→ 20th place)
- Juraj Benčík
  - Final — DSQ (→ no ranking)

Men's 50 km Walk

- Pavol Blažek
  - Final — 4:16:26 (→ 10th place)
- Juraj Benčík
  - Final — 4:27:39 (→ 13th place)
- Jaromír Vaňous
  - Final — DSQ (→ no ranking)

Women's 400 metres

- Jarmila Kratochvílová
  - Heat — 51.04
  - Semifinals — 50.79
  - Final — 49.46 NR (→ Silver Medal)

Women's Long Jump

- Jarmila Nygrýnová
  - Qualification — 6.58 m
  - Final — 6.83 m (→ 6th place)

Women's Discus Throw

- Zdena Bartoňová
  - Qualification — 59.48 m
  - Final — 57.78 m (→ 11th place)

Women's Shot Put

- Zdena Bartoňová
  - Final — 18.40 m (→ 10th place)

Women's Pentathlon

- Marcela Koblasová — 4328 points (→ 11th place)
  1. 100 metres — 14.10s
  2. Shot Put — 13.42m
  3. High Jump — 1.71m
  4. Long Jump — 6.15m
  5. 800 metres — 2:20.30

== Basketball ==
Men's team competition

- Preliminary round (group A)
  - Lost to Brazil (70-72)
  - Defeated India (133–65)
  - Lost to Soviet Union (83-99)
- Second Round (Group B)
  - Lost to Australia (86-91)
  - Defeated Sweden (83-61)
  - Lost to Poland (84-88)
  - Defeated Senegal (88-72) → 9th place
- Team Roster:
  - Jaroslav Skála
  - Dušan Žáček
  - Vlastimil Havlík
  - Peter Rajniak
  - Stanislav Kropilák
  - Pavol Bojanovský
  - Zdeněk Kos
  - Jiří Pospíšil
  - Vlastibor Klimeš
  - Kamil Brabenec
  - Zdeněk Douša
  - Gustáv Hraška

== Boxing ==
Men's Featherweight (57 kg)

- Miroslav Šandor
  1. First Round — Bye
  2. Second Round — Lost to Dejan Marovic (Yugoslavia) on points (0-5)

== Cycling ==
Eleven cyclists represented Czechoslovakia in 1980.

Individual road race

- Jiří Škoda
- Vlastibor Konečný
- Ladislav Ferebauer
- Michal Klasa

Team time trial

- Michal Klasa
- Vlastibor Konečný
- Alipi Kostadinov
- Jiří Škoda

Sprint

- Anton Tkáč

1000m time trial

- Petr Kocek

Individual pursuit

- Martin Penc

Team pursuit

- Teodor Černý
- Martin Penc
- Jiří Pokorný
- Igor Sláma

== Fencing ==
Seven fencers, six men and one woman, represented Czechoslovakia in 1980.

Men's foil

- Jaroslav Jurka
- František Koukal

Men's épée

- Jaroslav Jurka
- Oldřich Kubišta
- Jiří Douba

Men's team épée

- Jaroslav Jurka, Jaromír Holub, Jiří Douba, Jiří Adam, Oldřich Kubišta

Women's foil

- Katarína Lokšová-Ráczová

== Football ==
Men's team competition

=== Preliminary Round (Group B) ===
All matches were played at the Kirov Stadium in Leningrad except where noted.

- July 21, 1980 : Czechoslovakia - Colombia 3-0 (2-0)
- July 23, 1980 : Czechoslovakia - Nigeria 1-1 (1-0)
- July 25, 1980 : Czechoslovakia - Kuwait 0-0 (0-0)

=== Final standings ===
With four points each (one win and two draws), Czechoslovakia and Kuwait qualified for the quarterfinals.

=== Quarterfinals ===
- July 27, 1980 : Czechoslovakia - Cuba 4-0 (4-0)

=== Semifinals ===
- July 29, 1980 : Czechoslovakia - Yugoslavia 2-0 (2-0) at Dynamo Stadium, Moscow

=== Final ===
- August 2, 1980 : Czechoslovakia - East Germany 1-0 (0-0) Loujniki Stadium, Moscow

=== Roster ===
- Stanislav Seman
- Luděk Macela
- Josef Mazura
- Libor Radimec
- Zdeněk Rygel
- Petr Němec
- Ladislav Vízek
- Jan Berger
- Jindřich Svoboda
- Luboš Pokluda
- Werner Lička
- Rostislav Václavíček
- Jaroslav Netolička
- Oldřich Rott
- František Štambachr
- František Kunzo

== Handball ==
Women's Tournament

- Jana Kuťková

== Hockey ==
Women's team competition

- Preliminary Round Robin
  - Lost to Soviet Union (0-2)
  - Drew with Zimbabwe (2-2)
  - Defeated India (2-1)
  - Defeated Austria (5-0)
  - Defeated Poland (1-0) → Silver Medal
- Team Roster:
  - Jarmila Králíčková
  - Berta Hrubá
  - Iveta Šranková
  - Lenka Vymazalová
  - Jiřina Křížová
  - Jiřina Kadlecová
  - Jiřina Čermáková
  - Marta Urbanová
  - Květa Petříčková
  - Marie Sýkorová
  - Ida Hubáčková
  - Milada Blažková
  - Jana Lahodová
  - Alena Kyselicová
  - Jiřina Hájková
  - Viera Podhányiová

== Modern pentathlon ==
Three male pentathletes represented Czechoslovakia in 1980.

Men's Individual Competition:

- Milan Kadlec — 5229 pts, 8th place
- Jan Bártů — 5158 pts, 16th place
- Bohumil Starnovský — 4952 pts, 26th place

Men's Team Competition:

- Kadlec, Bártů, and Starnovský — 15339 pts, 6th place

== Swimming ==
Men's 200m Freestyle

- Petr Adamec
  - Final — 1:55.84 (→ did not advance)
- Radek Havel
  - Final — 1:55.07 (→ did not advance)

Men's 400m Freestyle

- Daniel Machek
  - Final — 3:55.66 (→ 5th place)

Men's 100m Backstroke

- Miloslav Rolko
  - Final — 57.74 (→ 4th place)

Men's 400m Individual Medley

- Miloslav Rolko
  - Final — 4:26.99 (→ 6th place)
- Daniel Machek
  - Final — 4:29.86 (→ 8th place)

Women's 100m Breaststroke

- Irena Fleissnerová
  - Heats — 1:13.35 (→ did not advance)

Women's 200m Breaststroke

- Irena Fleissnerová
  - Final — 2:33.23 (→ 5th place)

== Volleyball ==
Men's team competition

- Preliminary round (group A)
  - Lost to Soviet Union (1-3)
  - Lost to Italy (2-3)
  - Lost to Bulgaria (0-3)
  - Defeated Cuba (3-2)
- Classification Matches
  - 5th/8th place: Lost to Brazil (0-3)
  - 7th/8th place: Lost to Cuba (1-3) → 8th place
- Team Roster
  - Dušan Prieložný
  - Pavel Valach
  - Vlado Sirvoň
  - Ján Repák
  - Josef Novotný
  - Jaroslav Šmid
  - Vlastimil Lenert
  - Jaroslav Kopet
  - Ján Cifra
  - Pavel Řeřábek
  - Josef Pick
  - Cyril Krejčí
- Head coaches: Pavel Schenk and Zdeněk Václavík
