= Czechoslovakia at the Olympics =

- IOC code: TCH
- NOC: Czechoslovak Olympic Committee
- Medals Ranked 29th: Gold 51 Silver 57 Bronze 60 Total 168

Summer appearances
- 1920; 1924; 1928; 1932; 1936; 1948; 1952; 1956; 1960; 1964; 1968; 1972; 1976; 1980; 1984; 1988; 1992

Winter appearances
- 1924; 1928; 1932; 1936; 1948; 1952; 1956; 1960; 1964; 1968; 1972; 1976; 1980; 1984; 1988; 1992

Other related appearances
- Bohemia (1900–1912); Czech Republic (1994–pres.); Slovakia (1994–pres.)

Czechoslovakia first participated at the Olympic Games in 1920, after having competed as Bohemia from 1900 to 1912. The nation sent athletes to compete in every Summer Olympic Games since then, except for the 1984 Games when they were part of the Soviet-led boycott of the 1984 Summer Olympics. Czechoslovakia has participated in every Winter Olympic Games since the inaugural Games of 1924.

After the dissolution of Czechoslovakia in 1993, the Czech Republic and Slovakia sent independent teams to the Olympics starting in 1994.

Czechoslovak athletes have won a total of 143 medals at the Summer Games, mostly in gymnastics. The nation also won 25 medals at the Winter Games, with ski jumping and ice hockey as the top medal-producing sports.

== Timeline of participation ==
Olympic Years	Teams	
1900–1912	Bohemia	as part of Hungary
1920–1992	Czechoslovakia	
1994–present	Czech Republic	Slovakia

== Medal tables ==
=== Medals by Summer Games ===
Games	Athletes	Gold	Silver	Bronze	Total	Rank
1900–1912	as Bohemia					
(Belgium) 1920 Antwerp	121	0	0	2	2	21
(France) 1924 Paris	133	1	4	5	10	15
(Netherlands) 1928 Amsterdam	70	2	5	2	9	14
(United States) 1932 Los Angeles	7	1	2	1	4	17
(Nazi Germany) 1936 Berlin	188	3	5	0	8	12
(United Kingdom) 1948 London	87	6	2	3	11	8
(Finland) 1952 Helsinki	99	7	3	3	13	6
(Australia) 1956 Melbourne	63	1	4	1	6	18
(Italy) 1960 Rome	116	3	2	3	8	10
(Japan) 1964 Tokyo	104	5	6	3	14	9
1968 Mexico City	121	7	2	4	13	7
(West Germany) 1972 Munich	181	2	4	2	8	18
(Canada) 1976 Montreal	163	2	2	4	8	17
(Soviet Union) 1980 Moscow	209	2	3	9	14	13
(United States) 1984 Los Angeles	boycotted					
(South Korea) 1988 Seoul	163	3	3	2	8	17
(Spain) 1992 Barcelona	208	4	2	1	7	18
Total		49	49	45	143	28

=== Medals by Winter Games ===
Games	Athletes	Gold	Silver	Bronze	Total	Rank
(France) 1924 Chamonix	27	0	0	0	0	–
(Switzerland) 1928 St. Moritz	29	0	0	1	1	8
(United States) 1932 Lake Placid	6	0	0	0	0	–
(Nazi Germany) 1936 Garmisch-Partenkirchen	48	0	0	0	0	–
(Switzerland) 1948 St. Moritz	47	0	1	0	1	11
(Norway) 1952 Oslo	22	0	0	0	0	–
(Italy) 1956 Cortina d'Ampezzo	41	0	0	0	0	–
(United States) 1960 Squaw Valley	21	0	1	0	1	13
(Austria) 1964 Innsbruck	46	0	0	1	1	13
(France) 1968 Grenoble	48	1	2	1	4	12
(Japan) 1972 Sapporo	41	1	0	2	3	12
(Austria) 1976 Innsbruck	58	0	1	0	1	13
(United States) 1980 Lake Placid	41	0	0	1	1	17
(Socialist Federal Republic of Yugoslavia) 1984 Sarajevo	50	0	2	4	6	12
(Canada) 1988 Calgary	60	0	1	2	3	15
(France) 1992 Albertville	74	0	0	3	3	18
Total		2	8	15	25	32

=== Medals by summer sport ===
Sport	Gold	Silver	Bronze	Total
Gymnastics	12	13	10	35
Athletics	11	8	5	24
Canoeing	7	4	1	12
Shooting	4	3	2	9
Weightlifting	3	2	3	8
Boxing	3	1	2	6
Rowing	2	2	7	11
Cycling	2	2	2	6
Wrestling	1	7	7	15
Tennis	1	1	2	4
Diving	1	1	0	2
Football	1	1	0	2
Equestrian	1	0	0	1
Modern pentathlon	0	1	1	2
Volleyball	0	1	1	2
Field hockey	0	1	0	1
Handball	0	1	0	1
Judo	0	0	1	1
Totals (18 entries)	49	49	44	142

This table of summer sports does not include the bronze medal won in ice hockey at the 1920 Summer Olympics.

=== Medals by winter sport ===
Sport	Gold	Silver	Bronze	Total
Ski jumping	1	2	4	7
Figure skating	1	1	3	5
Ice hockey	0	4	4	8
Cross country skiing	0	1	4	5
Alpine skiing	0	0	1	1
Totals (5 entries)	2	8	16	26

This table includes the bronze medal won in ice hockey at the 1920 Summer Olympics.

== List of medalists ==
=== Summer Games ===
Medal	Name	Games	Sport	Event
Bronze	Czechoslovakia men's national ice hockey team: Karel Hartmann; Vilém Loos; Jan Palouš; Jan Peka; Karel Pešek; Josef Šroubek; Otakar Vindyš; Karel Wälzer	1920 Antwerp	Ice hockey	Men's competition
Bronze	Milada Skrbková; Ladislav Žemla	1920 Antwerp	Tennis	Mixed doubles
Gold	Bedřich Šupčík	1924 Paris	Gymnastics	Men's rope climbing
Silver	Robert Pražák	1924 Paris	Gymnastics	Men's artistic individual all-around
Silver	Robert Pražák	1924 Paris	Gymnastics	Men's parallel bars
Silver	Robert Pražák	1924 Paris	Gymnastics	Men's rings
Silver	Jan Koutný	1924 Paris	Gymnastics	Men's vault
Bronze	Bedřich Šupčík	1924 Paris	Gymnastics	Men's artistic individual all-around
Bronze	Ladislav Vácha	1924 Paris	Gymnastics	Men's rings
Bronze	Ladislav Vácha	1924 Paris	Gymnastics	Men's rope climbing
Bronze	Bohumil Mořkovský	1924 Paris	Gymnastics	Men's vault
Bronze	Bohumil Durdis	1924 Paris	Weightlifting	Men's 67.5 kg
Gold	František Ventura	1928 Amsterdam	Equestrian	Individual jumping
Gold	Ladislav Vácha	1928 Amsterdam	Gymnastics	Men's parallel bars
Silver	Jan Heřmánek	1928 Amsterdam	Boxing	Men's middleweight
Silver	Josef Effenberger; Jan Gajdoš; Jan Koutný; Emanuel Löffler; Bedřich Šupčík; Ladislav Tikal; Ladislav Vácha; Václav Veselý	1928 Amsterdam	Gymnastics	Men's team all-around
Silver	Ladislav Vácha	1928 Amsterdam	Gymnastics	Men's rings
Silver	Emanuel Löffler	1928 Amsterdam	Gymnastics	Men's vault
Silver	Jindřich Maudr	1928 Amsterdam	Wrestling	Men's Greco-Roman bantamweight
Bronze	Emanuel Löffler	1928 Amsterdam	Gymnastics	Men's rings
Bronze	Jaroslav Skobla	1928 Amsterdam	Weightlifting	Men's +82.5 kg
Gold	Jaroslav Skobla	1932 Los Angeles	Weightlifting	Men's heavyweight
Silver	Václav Pšenička	1932 Los Angeles	Weightlifting	Men's heavyweight
Silver	Josef Urban	1932 Los Angeles	Wrestling	Men's Greco-Roman heavyweight
Bronze	František Douda	1932 Los Angeles	Athletics	Men's shot put
Gold	Jan Brzák-Felix; Vladimír Syrovátka	1936 Berlin	Canoeing	Men's C-2 1000 m
Gold	Václav Mottl; Zdeněk Škrland	1936 Berlin	Canoeing	Men's C-2 10000 m
Gold	Alois Hudec	1936 Berlin	Gymnastics	Men's rings
Silver	Bohuslav Karlík	1936 Berlin	Canoeing	Men's C-1 1000 m
Silver	Jaroslava Bajerová; Vlasta Děkanová; Božena Dobešová; Vlasta Foltová; Anna Hřebřinová; Matylda Pálfyová; Zdeňka Veřmiřovská; Marie Větrovská	1936 Berlin	Gymnastics	Women's team all-around
Silver	Václav Pšenička	1936 Berlin	Weightlifting	Men's heavyweight
Silver	Jozef Herda	1936 Berlin	Wrestling	Men's Greco-Roman lightweight
Silver	Josef Klapuch	1936 Berlin	Wrestling	Men's freestyle heavyweight
Gold	Emil Zátopek	1948 London	Athletics	Men's 10,000 metres
Gold	František Čapek	1948 London	Canoeing	Men's C-1 10000 m
Gold	Josef Holeček	1948 London	Canoeing	Men's C-1 1000 m
Gold	Jan Brzák-Felix; Bohumil Kudrna	1948 London	Canoeing	Men's C-2 1000 m
Gold	Július Torma	1948 London	Boxing	Men's welterweight
Gold	Zdeňka Honsová; Marie Kovářová; Miloslava Misáková; Milena Müllerová; Věra Růžičková; Olga Šilhánová; Božena Srncová; Zdeňka Veřmiřovská; Eliška Misáková^{(awarded posthumously)}	1948 London	Gymnastics	Women's artistic team all-around
Silver	Emil Zátopek	1948 London	Athletics	Men's 5000 metres
Silver	Václav Havel; Jiří Pecka	1948 London	Canoeing	Men's C-2 10000 m
Bronze	Zdeněk Růžička	1948 London	Gymnastics	Men's floor
Bronze	Zdeněk Růžička	1948 London	Gymnastics	Men's rings
Bronze	Leo Sotorník	1948 London	Gymnastics	Men's vault
Gold	Emil Zátopek	1952 Helsinki	Athletics	Men's 5000 metres
Gold	Emil Zátopek	1952 Helsinki	Athletics	Men's 10000 metres
Gold	Emil Zátopek	1952 Helsinki	Athletics	Men's Marathon
Gold	Dana Zátopková	1952 Helsinki	Athletics	Women's javelin throw
Gold	Ján Zachara	1952 Helsinki	Boxing	Men's featherweight
Gold	Josef Holeček	1952 Helsinki	Canoeing	Men's C-1 1000 m
Gold	Karel Mejta; Jiří Havlis; Jan Jindra; Stanislav Lusk; Miroslav Koranda	1952 Helsinki	Rowing	Men's coxed four
Silver	Josef Doležal	1952 Helsinki	Athletics	Men's 50 km walk
Silver	Jan Brzák-Felix; Bohumil Kudrna	1952 Helsinki	Canoeing	Men's C-2 1000 m
Silver	Josef Růžička	1952 Helsinki	Wrestling	Men's Greco-Roman heavyweight
Bronze	Alfréd Jindra	1952 Helsinki	Canoeing	Men's C-1 10000 m
Bronze	Hana Bobková; Alena Chadimová; Jana Rabasová; Alena Reichová; Matylda Matoušková-Šínová; Božena Srncová; Věra Vančurová; Eva Věchtová	1952 Helsinki	Gymnastics	Women's team all-around
Bronze	Mikuláš Athanasov	1952 Helsinki	Wrestling	Men's Greco-Roman lightweight
Gold	Olga Fikotová	1956 Melbourne	Athletics	Women's discus throw
Silver	Otakar Hořínek	1956 Melbourne	Shooting	Men's 50 m rifle 3 positions
Silver	Eva Bosáková	1956 Melbourne	Gymnastics	Women's balance beam
Silver	Ladislav Fouček	1956 Melbourne	Cycling	Men's 1000 m time trial
Silver	Ladislav Fouček; Václav Machek	1956 Melbourne	Cycling	Men's tandem
Bronze	Jiří Skobla	1956 Melbourne	Athletics	Men's shot put
Gold	Bohumil Němeček	1960 Rome	Boxing	Men's light welterweight
Gold	Václav Kozák; Pavel Schmidt	1960 Rome	Rowing	Men's double sculls
Gold	Eva Bosáková	1960 Rome	Gymnastics	Women's balance beam
Silver	Dana Zátopková	1960 Rome	Athletics	Women's javelin throw
Silver	Eva Bosáková; Věra Čáslavská; Matylda Matoušková-Šínová; Hana Růžičková; Ludmila Švédová; Adolfína Tkačíková	1960 Rome	Gymnastics	Women's team all-around
Bronze	Josef Němec	1960 Rome	Boxing	Men's heavyweight
Bronze	Bohumil Janoušek; Jan Jindra; Jiří Lundák; Stanislav Lusk; Václav Pavkovič; Luděk Pojezný; Jan Švéda; Josef Věntus; Miroslav Koníček	1960 Rome	Rowing	Men's eight
Bronze	Bohumil Kubát	1960 Rome	Wrestling	Men's Greco-Roman heavyweight
Gold	Věra Čáslavská	1964 Tokyo	Gymnastics	Women's individual all-around
Gold	Věra Čáslavská	1964 Tokyo	Gymnastics	Women's vault
Gold	Věra Čáslavská	1964 Tokyo	Gymnastics	Women's balance beam
Gold	Jiří Daler	1964 Tokyo	Cycling	Men's individual pursuit
Gold	Hans Zdražila	1964 Tokyo	Weightlifting	Men's middleweight
Silver	Josef Odložil	1964 Tokyo	Athletics	Men's 1500 m
Silver	Ludvík Daněk	1964 Tokyo	Athletics	Men's discus throw
Silver	Czechoslovakia national football team: Jan Brumovský; Ludovít Cvetler; Ján Geleta; František Knebort; Karel Knesl; Karel Lichtnégl; Vojtech Masný; Štefan Matlák; Ivan Mráz; Karel Nepomucký; Zdeněk Pičman; František Schmucker; Anton Švajlen; Anton Urban; František Valošek; Josef Vojta; Vladimír Weiss	1964 Tokyo	Football	Men's competition
Silver	Věra Čáslavská; Marianna Krajčírová; Jana Posnerová; Hana Růžičková; Jaroslava Sedláčková; Adolfína Tkačíková	1964 Tokyo	Gymnastics	Women's team all-around
Silver	Czechoslovakia men's national volleyball team: Milan Čuda; Bohumil Golián; Zdeněk Humhal; Petr Kop; Josef Labuda; Josef Musil; Karel Paulus; Boris Perušič; Pavel Schenk; Václav Šmídl; Josef Šorm; Ladislav Toman	1964 Tokyo	Volleyball	Men's tournament
Silver	Jiří Kormaník	1964 Tokyo	Wrestling	Men's Greco-Roman middleweight
Bronze	Lubomír Nácovský	1964 Tokyo	Shooting	Men's 25 m rapid fire pistol
Bronze	Petr Čermák; Jiří Lundák; Jan Mrvík; Július Toček; Josef Věntus; Luděk Pojezný; Bohumil Janoušek; Richard Nový; Miroslav Koníček	1964 Tokyo	Rowing	Men's eight
Bronze	Vladimír Andrs; Pavel Hofmann	1964 Tokyo	Rowing	Men's double sculls
Gold	Miloslava Rezková	1968 Mexico City	Athletics	Women's high jump
Gold	Milena Duchková	1968 Mexico City	Diving	Women's 10 m platform
Gold	Věra Čáslavská	1968 Mexico City	Gymnastics	Women's individual all-around
Gold	Věra Čáslavská	1968 Mexico City	Gymnastics	Women's floor
Gold	Věra Čáslavská	1968 Mexico City	Gymnastics	Women's vault
Gold	Věra Čáslavská	1968 Mexico City	Gymnastics	Women's uneven bars
Gold	Jan Kůrka	1968 Mexico City	Shooting	Mixed 50 m rifle, prone
Silver	Věra Čáslavská	1968 Mexico City	Gymnastics	Women's balance beam
Silver	Věra Čáslavská; Marianna Krajčírová; Jana Kubičková; Hana Lišková; Bohumila Řimnáčová; Miroslava Skleničková	1968 Mexico City	Gymnastics	Women's team all-around
Bronze	Ludvík Daněk	1968 Mexico City	Athletics	Men's discus throw
Bronze	Czechoslovakia men's national volleyball team: Antonín Procházka; Jiří Svoboda; Luboš Zajíček; Josef Musil; Josef Smolka; Vladimír Petlák; Petr Kop; František Sokol; Bohunil Golián; Zdeněk Groessl; Pavel Schenk; Drahomír Koudelka	1968 Mexico City	Volleyball	Men's tournament
Bronze	Miroslav Zeman	1968 Mexico City	Wrestling	Men's Greco-Roman 52 kg
Bronze	Petr Kment	1968 Mexico City	Wrestling	Men's Greco-Roman +97 kg
Gold	Ludvík Daněk	1972 Munich	Athletics	Men's discus throw
Gold	Vítězslav Mácha	1972 Munich	Wrestling	Men's Greco-Roman 74 kg
Silver	Milena Duchková	1972 Munich	Diving	Women's 10 m platform
Silver	Czechoslovakia national handball team: Ladislav Beneš; František Brůna; Vladimír Haber; Vladimír Jarý; Jiří Kavan; Arnošt Klimčík; Jaroslav Konečný; František Králík; Jindřich Krepindl; Vincent Lafko; Andrej Lukošík; Pavel Mikeš; Petr Pospíšil; Ivan Satrapa; Zdeněk Škára; Jaroslav Škarvan	1972 Munich	Handball	Men's competition
Silver	Vladimír Petříček; Pavel Svojanovský; Oldřich Svojanovský	1972 Munich	Rowing	Men's coxed pair
Silver	Ladislav Falta	1972 Munich	Shooting	Mixed 25 m rapid fire pistol
Bronze	Eva Šuranová	1972 Munich	Athletics	Women's long jump
Bronze	Vladimír Jánoš; Otakar Mareček; Karel Neffe; Vladimír Petříček; František Provazník	1972 Munich	Rowing	Men's coxed four
Gold	Anton Tkáč	1976 Montreal	Cycling	Men's sprint
Gold	Josef Panáček	1976 Montreal	Shooting	Mixed skeet
Silver	Jiří Adam; Jan Bártů; Bohumil Starnovský	1976 Montreal	Modern pentathlon	Men's team
Silver	Vítězslav Mácha	1976 Montreal	Wrestling	Men's Greco-Roman 74 kg
Bronze	Helena Fibingerová	1976 Montreal	Athletics	Women's shot put
Bronze	Jan Bártů	1976 Montreal	Modern pentathlon	Men's individual
Bronze	Jaroslav Hellebrand; Vladek Lacina; Zdeněk Pecka; Václav Vochoska	1976 Montreal	Rowing	Men's quadruple sculls
Bronze	Oldřich Svojanovský; Pavel Svojanovský; Ludvík Vébr	1976 Montreal	Rowing	Men's coxed pair
Gold	Ota Zaremba	1980 Moscow	Weightlifting	Men's 100 kg
Gold	Czechoslovakia national football team: Stanislav Seman; Luděk Macela; Josef Mazura; Libor Radimec; Zdeněk Rygel; Petr Němec; Ladislav Vízek; Jan Berger; Jindřich Svoboda; Lubomír Pokluda; Werner Lička; Rostislav Václavíček; Jaroslav Netolička; Oldřich Rott; František Štambacher; František Kunzo	1980 Moscow	Football	Men's competition
Silver	Imrich Bugár	1980 Moscow	Athletics	Men's discus throw
Silver	Jarmila Kratochvílová	1980 Moscow	Athletics	Women's 400 m
Silver	Czechoslovakia women's national field hockey team: Milada Blažková; Jiřina Čermáková; Jiřina Hájková; Berta Hrubá; Ida Hubáčková; Jiřina Kadlecová; Jarmila Králíčková; Jiřina Křížová; Alena Kyselicová; Jana Lahodová; Květa Petříčková; Viera Podhányiová; Iveta Šranková; Marie Sýkorová; Marta Urbanová; Lenka Vymazalová	1980 Moscow	Field hockey	Women's tournament
Bronze	Ján Franek	1980 Moscow	Boxing	Men's light middleweight
Bronze	Jiří Tabák	1980 Moscow	Gymnastics	Men's rings
Bronze	Vladimír Kocman	1980 Moscow	Judo	Men's +95 kg
Bronze	Dušan Poliačik	1980 Moscow	Weightlifting	Men's 82.5 kg
Bronze	Dan Karabin	1980 Moscow	wrestling	Men's freestyle 74 kg
Bronze	Július Strnisko	1980 Moscow	wrestling	Men's freestyle 100 kg
Bronze	Zdeněk Pecka; Václav Vochoska	1980 Moscow	Rowing	Men's double sculls
Bronze	Teodor Černý; Martin Penc; Jiří Pokorný; Igor Sláma	1980 Moscow	Cycling	Men's team pursuit
Bronze	Michal Klasa; Vlastibor Konečný; Alipi Kostadinov; Jiří Škoda	1980 Moscow	Cycling	Men's team time trial
Gold	Miroslav Varga	1988 Seoul	Shooting	Men's 50 m rifle prone
Gold	Jozef Pribilinec	1988 Seoul	Athletics	Men's 20 km walk
Gold	Miloslav Mečíř	1988 Seoul	Tennis	Men's singles
Silver	Miloslav Bednařík	1988 Seoul	Shooting	Trap
Silver	Jan Železný	1988 Seoul	Athletics	Men's javelin throw
Silver	Jana Novotná; Helena Suková	1988 Seoul	Tennis	Women's doubles
Bronze	Miloslav Mečíř; Milan Šrejber	1988 Seoul	Tennis	Men's doubles
Bronze	Jozef Lohyňa	1988 Seoul	Wrestling	Men's freestyle 82 kg
Gold	Lukáš Pollert	1992 Barcelona	Canoeing	Men's slalom C-1
Gold	Petr Hrdlička	1992 Barcelona	Shooting	Trap
Gold	Robert Změlík	1992 Barcelona	Athletics	Men's decathlon
Gold	Jan Železný	1992 Barcelona	Athletics	Men's javelin throw
Silver	Václav Chalupa	1992 Barcelona	Rowing	Men's single sculls
Silver	Jiří Rohan; Miroslav Šimek	1992 Barcelona	Canoeing	Men's slalom C-2
Bronze	Luboš Račanský	1992 Barcelona	Shooting	Men's 10 metre running target

=== Winter Games ===
Medal	Name	Games	Sport	Event
Bronze	Rudolf Burkert	1928 St. Moritz	Ski jumping	Men's individual
Silver	Czechoslovakia men's national ice hockey team: Bohumil Modrý; Zdeněk Jarkovský; Miroslav Sláma; Josef Trousílek; Přemysl Hainý; Vilibald Šťovík; Oldřich Zábrodský; Miloslav Pokorný; Ladislav Troják; Vladimír Zábrodský; Stanislav Konopásek; Václav Roziňák; Jaroslav Drobný; Karel Stibor; Vladimír Kobranov; Gustav Bubník; Vladimír Bouzek	1948 St. Moritz	Ice hockey	Men's competition
Silver	Karol Divín	1960 Squaw Valley	Figure skating	Men's singles
Bronze	Czechoslovakia men's national ice hockey team: Vladimír Dzurilla; Vladimír Nadrchal; Rudolf Potsch; František Tikal; František Gregor; Stanislav Sventek; Ladislav Šmíd; Vlastimil Bubník; Jaroslav Walter; Miroslav Vlach; Jiří Dolana; Jiří Holík; Josef Černý; Stanislav Prýl; Jozef Golonka; Jaroslav Jiřík; Jan Klapáč	1964 Innsbruck	Ice hockey	Men's competition
Gold	Jiří Raška	1968 Grenoble	Ski jumping	Men's normal hill
Silver	Czechoslovakia men's national ice hockey team: Vladimír Nadrchal; Vladimír Dzurilla; Josef Horešovský; Jan Suchý; Karel Masopust; František Pospíšil; Oldřich Machač; Jozef Golonka; Jan Hrbatý; Václav Nedomanský; Jan Havel; Jaroslav Jiřík; Josef Černý; František Ševčík; Petr Hejma; Jiří Holík; Jiří Kochta; Jan Klapáč	1968 Grenoble	Ice hockey	Men's competition
Silver	Jiří Raška	1968 Grenoble	Ski jumping	Men's large hill
Bronze	Hana Maskova	1968 Grenoble	Figure skating	Women's singles
Gold	Ondrej Nepela	1972 Sapporo	Figure skating	Men's singles
Bronze	Helena Šikolová	1972 Sapporo	Cross-country skiing	Women's 5 km
Bronze	Czechoslovakia men's national ice hockey team: Vladimír Dzurilla; Jiří Holeček; Vladimír Bednář; Rudolf Tajcnár; Oldřich Machač; František Pospíšil; Josef Horešovský; Karel Vohralík; Václav Nedomanský; Jiří Holík; Jaroslav Holík; Jiří Kochta; Eduard Novák; Richard Farda; Josef Černý; Vladimír Martinec; Ivan Hlinka; Bohuslav Šťastný	1972 Sapporo	Ice hockey	Men's competition
Silver	Czechoslovakia men's national ice hockey team: Jiří Holík; Oldřich Machač; František Pospíšil; Jiří Holeček; Bohuslav Šťastný; Ivan Hlinka; Vladimír Martinec; Eduard Novák; Josef Augusta; Jiří Bubla; Milan Chalupa; Jiří Crha; Miroslav Dvořák; Bohuslav Ebermann; Milan Kajkl; Jiří Novák; Milan Nový; Jaroslav Pouzar	1976 Innsbruck	Ice hockey	Men's tournament
Bronze	Květa Jeriová	1980 Lake Placid	Cross-country skiing	Women's 5 km
Silver	Květa Jeriová; Blanka Paulů; Gabriela Svobodová; Dagmar Švubová	1984 Sarajevo	Cross-country skiing	Women's 4 x 5 km relay
Silver	Czechoslovakia men's national ice hockey team: Jaroslav Benák; Vladimír Caldr; František Černík; Miloslav Hořava; Jiří Hrdina; Milan Chalupa; Arnold Kadlec; Jaroslav Korbela; Jiří Králík; Vladimír Kýhos; Jiří Lála; Igor Liba; Vincent Lukáč; Dušan Pašek; Pavel Richter; Dárius Rusnák; Vladimír Růžička; Radoslav Svoboda; Jaromír Šindel; Eduard Uvíra	1984 Sarajevo	Ice hockey	Men's tournament
Bronze	Květa Jeriová	1984 Sarajevo	Cross-country skiing	Women's 5 km
Bronze	Olga Charvátová	1984 Sarajevo	Alpine skiing	Women's downhill
Bronze	Jozef Sabovčík	1984 Sarajevo	Figure skating	Men's singles
Bronze	Pavel Ploc	1984 Sarajevo	Ski jumping	Large hill individual
Silver	Pavel Ploc	1988 Calgary	Ski jumping	Normal hill individual
Bronze	Jiří Malec	1988 Calgary	Ski jumping	Normal hill individual
Bronze	Radim Nyč; Václav Korunka; Pavel Benc; Ladislav Švanda	1988 Calgary	Cross-country skiing	Men's 4 × 10 kilometre relay
Bronze	Tomáš Goder; František Jež; Jaroslav Sakala; Jiří Parma	1992 Albertville	Ski jumping	Large hill team
Bronze	Petr Barna	1992 Albertville	Figure skating	Men's singles
Bronze	Czechoslovakia men's national ice hockey team: Patrik Augusta; Petr Bříza; Leo Gudas; Miloslav Hořava; Petr Hrbek; Otakar Janecký; Tomáš Jelínek; Richard Žemlička; Drahomír Kadlec; Kamil Kašťák; Robert Lang; Igor Liba; Ladislav Lubina; František Procházka; Petr Rosol; Bedřich Ščerban; Jiří Šlégr; Richard Šmehlík; Róbert Švehla; Oldřich Svoboda; Radek Ťoupal; Peter Veselovský	1992 Albertville	Ice hockey	Men's tournament

== List of multiple medalists ==
=== Summer games ===
The Czechoslovak athlete who won the most medals in the history of the Summer Olympic Games is the gymnast Věra Čáslavská with ten medals.

Athlete	Sport	Games	Gold	Silver	Bronze	Total
Věra Čáslavská	Gymnastics	1960, 1964, 1968	6	4	0	10
Emil Zátopek	Athletics	1948, 1952	4	1	0	5
Ladislav Vácha	Gymnastics	1924, 1928	1	2	2	5
Jan Brzák-Felix	Canoeing	1936, 1948, 1952	2	1	0	3
Eva Bosáková	Gymnastics	1956, 1960	1	2	0	3
Ludvík Daněk	Athletics	1964, 1968, 1972	1	1	1	3
Bedřich Šupčík	Gymnastics	1924, 1928	1	1	1	3
Robert Pražák	Gymnastics	1924	0	3	0	3
Emanuel Löffler	Gymnastics	1928	0	2	1	3
Milena Duchková	Diving	1968, 1972	1	1	0	2
Bohumil Kudrna	Canoeing	1948, 1952	1	1	0	2
Vítězslav Mácha	Wrestling	1972, 1976	1	1	0	2
Zdeňka Veřmiřovská	Gymnastics	1936, 1948	1	1	0	2
Dana Zátopková	Athletics	1952, 1960	1	1	0	2
Jan Železný^{ZEL}	Athletics	1988, 1992	1	1	0	2
Jan Jindra	Rowing	1952, 1960	1	0	1	2
Stanislav Lusk	Rowing	1952, 1960	1	0	1	2
Miloslav Mečíř	Tennis	1988	1	0	1	2
Božena Srncová	Gymnastics	1948, 1952	1	0	1	2
Ladislav Fouček	Cycling	1956	0	2	0	2
Jan Koutný	Gymnastics	1924, 1928	0	2	0	2
Marianna Krajčírová	Gymnastics	1964, 1968	0	2	0	2
Václav Pšenička	Weightlifting	1932, 1936	0	2	0	2
Hana Růžičková	Gymnastics	1960, 1964	0	2	0	2
Adolfína Tkačíková	Gymnastics	1960, 1964	0	2	0	2
Jan Bártů	Modern pentathlon	1976	0	1	1	2
Jaroslav Skobla	Weightlifting	1928, 1932	0	1	1	2
Petr Kop	Volleyball	1964, 1968	0	1	1	2
Matylda Matoušková-Šínová	Gymnastics	1952, 1960	0	1	1	2
Josef Musil	Volleyball	1964, 1968	0	1	1	2
Vladimír Petříček	Rowing	1972	0	1	1	2
Pavel Schenk	Volleyball	1964, 1968	0	1	1	2
Pavel Svojanovský	Rowing	1972, 1976	0	1	1	2
Oldřich Svojanovský	Rowing	1972, 1976	0	1	1	2
Josef Holeček	Canoeing	1948, 1952	0	0	2	2
Bohumil Janoušek	Rowing	1960, 1964	0	0	2	2
Miroslav Koníček	Rowing	1960, 1964	0	0	2	2
Jiří Lundák	Rowing	1960, 1964	0	0	2	2
Zdeněk Pecka	Rowing	1976, 1980	0	0	2	2
Luděk Pojezný	Rowing	1960, 1964	0	0	2	2
Zdeněk Růžička	Gymnastics	1948	0	0	2	2
Josef Věntus	Rowing	1960, 1964	0	0	2	2
Václav Vochoska	Rowing	1976, 1980	0	0	2	2
Lukáš Pollert^{POL}	Canoeing	1992	1	0	0	1
Jana Novotná^{NOV}	Tennis	1988	0	1	0	1
Helena Suková^{SUK}	Tennis	1988	0	1	0	1
Jiří Rohan^{ROH}	Canoeing	1992	0	1	0	1
Miroslav Šimek^{SIM}	Canoeing	1992	0	1	0	1

^{ZEL} Jan Železný also won two other gold medals in javelin throw for Czech Republic at 1996 Olympics and 2000 Olympics.
^{POL} Lukáš Pollert also won silver medal for Czech Republic in canoe slalom at the 1996 Olympics.
^{NOV} Jana Novotná also won bronze medal in women's singles and silver medal in women's doubles for Czech Republic at the 1996 Olympics.
^{SUK} Helena Suková also won silver medal in women's doubles for Czech Republic at the 1996 Olympics.
^{ROH} Jiří Rohan also won silver medal Czech Republic in canoe slalom at the 1996 Olympics.
^{SIM} Miroslav Šimek also won silver medal Czech Republic in canoe slalom at the 1996 Olympics.

=== Winter Games ===
The Czechoslovak athlete who won the most medals in the history of the Winter Olympic Games is the ice hockey player Jiří Holík with four medals.

Athlete	Sport	Games	Gold	Silver	Bronze	Total
Jiří Holík^{IH}	Ice hockey	1964, 1968, 1972, 1976	0	2	2	4
Oldřich Machač^{IH}	Ice hockey	1968, 1972, 1976	0	2	1	3
František Pospíšil^{IH}	Ice hockey	1968, 1972, 1976	0	2	1	3
Josef Černý^{IH}	Ice hockey	1964, 1968, 1972	0	1	2	3
Vladimír Dzurilla^{IH}	Ice hockey	1964, 1968, 1972	0	1	2	3
Květa Jeriová	Cross-country skiing	1980, 1984	0	1	2	3
Jiří Raška	Ski jumping	1968	1	1	0	2
Milan Chalupa^{IH}	Ice hockey	1976, 1984	0	2	0	2
Ivan Hlinka^{IH} ^{NAG}	Ice hockey	1972, 1976	0	1	1	2
Jiří Holeček^{IH}	Ice hockey	1972, 1976	0	1	1	2
Josef Horešovský^{IH}	Ice hockey	1968, 1972	0	1	1	2
Miloslav Hořava^{IH}	Ice hockey	1984, 1992	0	1	1	2
Jozef Golonka^{IH}	Ice hockey	1964, 1968	0	1	1	2
Jaroslav Jiřík^{IH}	Ice hockey	1964, 1968	0	1	1	2
Jan Klapáč^{IH}	Ice hockey	1964, 1968	0	1	1	2
Jiří Kochta^{IH}	Ice hockey	1968, 1972	0	1	1	2
Igor Liba^{IH}	Ice hockey	1984, 1992	0	1	1	2
Vladimír Martinec^{IH}	Ice hockey	1972, 1976	0	1	1	2
Vladimír Nadrchal^{IH}	Ice hockey	1964, 1968	0	1	1	2
Václav Nedomanský^{IH}	Ice hockey	1968, 1972	0	1	1	2
Eduard Novák^{IH}	Ice hockey	1972, 1976	0	1	1	2
Pavel Ploc	Ski jumping	1984, 1988	0	1	1	2
Bohuslav Šťastný^{IH}	Ice hockey	1972, 1976	0	1	1	2
Robert Lang^{IH} ^{CZE}	Ice hockey	1992	0	0	1	1
Jiří Šlégr^{IH} ^{CZE}	Ice hockey	1992	0	0	1	1
Richard Šmehlík^{IH} ^{CZE}	Ice hockey	1992	0	0	1	1
Jaroslav Walter^{IH} ^{WAL}	Ice hockey	1964	0	0	1	1

^{IH} As a part of the Czechoslovakia national ice hockey team.
^{NAG} Ivan Hlinka was head coach of Czechoslovakia national ice hockey team which ended up third at the 1992 Olympics and Czech national ice hockey team which ended up first at the 1998 Olympics.
^{CZE} Robert Lang, Jiří Šlégr and Richard Šmehlík also won gold medal in ice hockey at the 1998 Olympics as a part of the Czech Republic national ice hockey team. Robert Lang later won bronze medal in ice hockey at the 2006 Olympics.
^{WAL} Jaroslav Walter also won bronze medal as an assistant coach of Czechoslovakia national ice hockey team at the 1992 Olympics.

== See also ==
- List of flag bearers for Czechoslovakia at the Olympics
- Category:Olympic competitors for Czechoslovakia
- Czechoslovakia at the Paralympics
- Bohemia at the Olympics
- Czech Republic at the Olympics
- Slovakia at the Olympics
