= Field hockey at the 1980 Summer Olympics – Women's tournament =

Women's field hockey at the 1980 Summer Olympics

Tournament details
- Host country: Soviet Union
- City: Moscow
- Dates: 25–31 July 1980
- Teams: 6
- Venue(s): Minor Arena of Dynamo Stadium and Young Pioneers Stadium

Final positions
- Champions: Zimbabwe (1st title)
- Runner-up: Czechoslovakia
- Third place: Soviet Union

Tournament statistics
- Matches played: 15
- Goals scored: 49 (3.27 per match)
- Top scorer(s): (Soviet Union) Natella Krasnikova (Zimbabwe) Patricia McKillop (6 goals)

The women's field hockey tournament at the 1980 Summer Olympics was the first edition of the field hockey event for women at the Summer Olympic Games. It was held over a six-day period beginning on 25 July, and culminating on 31 July 1980. Games were played across two venues in Moscow, at the Minor Arena at Dynamo Stadium and Young Pioneers Stadium.

Zimbabwe won the gold medal finishing top of the pool at the conclusion of the pool stage. Czechoslovakia and the Soviet Union won the silver and bronze respectively, finishing in second and third place in the pool.

== Qualification ==
In 1980, there was an International Federation of Women's Hockey Associations (IFWHA), separate from the predominantly male Fédération Internationale de Hockey (FIH). Because the FIH was the international federation affiliated to the International Olympic Committee, it supervised the Olympic tournament.

The FIH and IFWHA agreed that qualification for the Olympics would be decided by a joint FIH–IFWHA committee based on the results over the previous two years, including the 1978 (FIH) and 1979 (IFWHA) women's world championships.

Five teams qualified to join the host Soviet team: the Netherlands, West Germany, the United States, New Zealand, and Great Britain (taking the place of Wales, England, and Scotland, who had finished 5th, 6th, and 7th respectively in the 1979 tournament).

However, all five of these teams boycotted to protest the Soviet invasion of Afghanistan. The United States and West Germany boycotted completely, and while New Zealand, Great Britain and the Netherlands competed in other sports, their hockey governing bodies pulled out.

This threw the tournament into chaos. Subsequently, the organising committee sent out invitations to other countries, though Ireland declined their invitation.

== Results ==
=== Pool ===
Pos	Team	Pld	W	D	L	GF	GA	GD	Pts
1st place, gold medalist(s)	Zimbabwe	5	3	2	0	13	4	+9	8
2nd place, silver medalist(s)	Czechoslovakia	5	3	1	1	10	5	+5	7
3rd place, bronze medalist(s)	Soviet Union	5	3	0	2	11	5	+6	6
4	India	5	2	1	2	9	6	+3	5
5	Austria	5	2	0	3	6	11	−5	4
6	Poland	5	0	0	5	0	18	−18	0

Source: FIH

==== Pool matches ====
25 July 1980
11:00

Poland	0–4	Zimbabwe
	Report	Chase (1); Davies (1); McKillop (1); Watson (1)

Stadium:
Young Pioneers Stadium

25 July 1980
12:45

Austria	0–2	India
	Report	Fernandes (1); Saini (1)

Stadium:
Young Pioneers Stadium

25 July 1980
17:00

Soviet Union	2–0	Czechoslovakia
Buzunova (1); Krasnikova (1)	Report

Stadium:
Young Pioneers Stadium

27 July 1980
13:00

India	4–0	Poland
Saini (1); Sharma (2); Sonir (1)	Report

Stadium:
Minor Arena, Dynamo Stadium

27 July 1980
14:45

Zimbabwe	2–2	Czechoslovakia
Chase (1); McKillop (1)	Report	Hubáčková (1); Kadlecová (1)

Stadium:
Minor Arena, Dynamo Stadium

27 July 1980
17:00

Soviet Union	0–2	Austria
	Report	Lorenz (1); Pistauer (1)

Stadium:
Minor Arena, Dynamo Stadium

28 July 1980
13:00

India	1–2	Czechoslovakia
Sonir (1)	Report	Hubáčková (1); Kyselicová (1)

Stadium:
Young Pioneers Stadium

28 July 1980
14:45

Austria	3–0	Poland
Kindler (1); Porsch (2)	Report

Stadium:
Young Pioneers Stadium

28 July 1980
17:00

Soviet Union	0–2	Zimbabwe
	Report	McKillop (2)

Stadium:
Minor Arena, Dynamo Stadium

30 July 1980
15:30

Soviet Union	6–0	Poland
Buzunova (2); Krasnikova (4)	Report

Stadium:
Minor Arena, Dynamo Stadium

30 July 1980
17:15

India	1–1	Zimbabwe
Saini (1)	Report	Chase (1)

Stadium:
Minor Arena, Dynamo Stadium

30 July 1980
17:15

Austria	0–5	Czechoslovakia
	Report	Čermáková (3); Hájková (1); Kadlecová (1)

Stadium:
Young Pioneers Stadium

31 July 1980
10:00

Poland	0–1	Czechoslovakia
	Report	Lahodová (1)

Stadium:
Minor Arena, Dynamo Stadium

31 July 1980
11:45

Austria	1–4	Zimbabwe
Kindler (1)	Report	Chick (1); Cowley (1); McKillop (2)

Stadium:
Minor Arena, Dynamo Stadium

31 July 1980
15:30

Soviet Union	3–1	India
Buzunova (2); Krasnikova (1)	Report	Saini (1)

Stadium:
Minor Arena, Dynamo Stadium

== Medal Winning Squads ==
Gold Medal	Silver Medal	Bronze Medal
Zimbabwe (ZIM)	Czechoslovakia (TCH)	Soviet Union (URS)
Arlene Boxhall; Liz Chase; Sandra Chick; Gillian Cowley; Patricia Davies; Sarah English; Maureen George; Ann Grant; Susan Huggett; Patricia McKillop; Brenda Phillips; Christine Prinsloo; Sonia Robertson; Anthea Stewart; Helen Volk; Linda Watson	Milada Blažková; Jiřina Čermáková; Jiřina Hájková; Berta Hrubá; Ida Hubáčková; Jiřina Kadlecová; Jarmila Králíčková; Jiřina Křížová; Alena Kyselicová; Jana Lahodová; Květa Petříčková; Viera Podhányiová; Iveta Šranková; Marie Sýkorová; Marta Urbanová; Lenka Vymazalová	Liailia Akhmerova; Natalia Buzunova; Natalia Bykova; Tatiana Embakhtova; Nadezhda Filippova; Liudmila Frolova; Lidia Glubokova; Nelli Gorbatkova; Elena Guryeva; Galina Inzhuvatova; Alina Kham; Natella Krasnikova; Nadezhda Ovechkina; Tatiana Shvyganova; Galina Viuzhanina; Valentina Zazdravnykh

== Statistics ==
=== Final rankings ===
1. Zimbabwe
2. Czechoslovakia
3. Soviet Union
4. India
5. Austria
6. Poland

=== Goalscorers ===
6 Goals

- (Soviet Union) Natella Krasnikova
- (Zimbabwe) Patricia McKillop

5 Goals

- (Soviet Union) Natalia Buzunova

4 Goals

- (India) Rup Kumari Saini

3 Goals

- (Czechoslovakia) Jiřina Čermáková
- (Zimbabwe) Elizabeth Chase

2 Goals

- (Austria) Brigitte Kindler
- (Austria) Andrea Porsch
- (Czechoslovakia) Ida Hubáčková
- (Czechoslovakia) Jiřina Kadlecová
- (India) Nisha Sharma
- (India) Prem Maya Sonir

1 Goal

- (Austria) Regina Lorenz
- (Austria) Elisabeth Pistauer
- (Czechoslovakia) Jiřina Hájková
- (Czechoslovakia) Alena Kyselicová
- (Czechoslovakia) Jana Lahodová
- (India) Lorraine Fernandes
- (Zimbabwe) Sandra Chick
- (Zimbabwe) Gillian Cowley
- (Zimbabwe) Patricia Davies
- (Zimbabwe) Linda Watson
