= Slovakia at the Olympics =

- IOC code: SVK
- NOC: Slovak Olympic and Sports Committee
- Website: www.olympic.sk (in Slovak)
- Medals Ranked 53rd: Gold 14 Silver 19 Bronze 10 Total 43

Summer appearances
- 1996; 2000; 2004; 2008; 2012; 2016; 2020; 2024; 2028

Winter appearances
- 1994; 1998; 2002; 2006; 2010; 2014; 2018; 2022; 2026

Other related appearances
- Hungary (1896–1912); Czechoslovakia (1924–1992)

Slovakia first participated at the Olympic Games in 1994, and has sent athletes to compete in every Games since then. Prior to the dissolution of Czechoslovakia in 1993, Slovak athletes competed for Czechoslovakia at the Olympics.

Slovak athletes have won a total of thirty three medals at the Summer Olympic Games, mostly in slalom canoeing. The nation has also won ten medals at the Winter Olympic Games.

The National Olympic Committee for Slovakia was created in 1992 and recognized in 1993.

== Timeline of participation ==
Olympic Years	Teams	
1900–1912	Bohemia	as part of Hungary
1920–1992	Czechoslovakia	
1994–present	Czech Republic	Slovakia

== Medal tables ==
=== Medals by Summer Games ===
Games	Athletes	Gold	Silver	Bronze	Total	Rank
1896–1912	as part of Hungary					
1920–1992	as part of Czechoslovakia					
(United States) 1996 Atlanta	71	1	1	1	3	43
(Australia) 2000 Sydney	112	1	3	1	5	39
(Greece) 2004 Athens	64	2	2	2	6	29
(China) 2008 Beijing	58	3	3	0	6	25
(United Kingdom) 2012 London	47	0	1	3	4	59
(Brazil) 2016 Rio de Janeiro	51	2	2	0	4	37
(Japan) 2020 Tokyo	41	1	2	1	4	50
(France) 2024 Paris	28	0	0	1	1	84
(United States) 2028 Los Angeles	future event					
(Australia) 2032 Brisbane	future event					
Total		10	14	9	33	57

=== Medals by Winter Games ===
Games	Athletes	Gold	Silver	Bronze	Total	Rank
1924–1992	as part of Czechoslovakia					
(Norway) 1994 Lillehammer	42	0	0	0	0	–
(Japan) 1998 Nagano	37	0	0	0	0	–
(United States) 2002 Salt Lake City	49	0	0	0	0	–
(Italy) 2006 Turin	58	0	1	0	1	21
(Canada) 2010 Vancouver	73	1	2	0	3	17
(Russia) 2014 Sochi	63	1	0	0	1	22
(South Korea) 2018 Pyeongchang	56	1	2	0	3	17
(China) 2022 Beijing	50	1	0	1	2	21
(Italy) 2026 Milano Cortina	53	0	0	0	0	–
(France) 2030 French Alps	future event					
(United States) 2034 Utah	future event					
Total		4	5	1	10	29

=== Medals by summer sport ===
Sport	Gold	Silver	Bronze	Total
Canoeing	8	7	6	21
Shooting	1	2	3	6
Athletics	1	0	0	1
Swimming	0	2	0	2
Golf	0	1	0	1
Judo	0	1	0	1
Wrestling	0	1	0	1
Totals (7 entries)	10	14	9	33

=== Medals by winter sport ===
Sport	Gold	Silver	Bronze	Total
Biathlon	3	4	0	7
Alpine skiing	1	0	0	1
Snowboarding	0	1	0	1
Ice hockey	0	0	1	1
Totals (4 entries)	4	5	1	10

== List of medalists - Slovakia since 1993 ==
=== Summer Games ===
Medal	Name	Games	Sport	Event
Gold	Michal Martikán	(United States) 1996 Atlanta	Canoeing	Men's C-1 slalom
Silver	Slavomír Kňazovický	(United States) 1996 Atlanta	Canoeing	Men's C-1 500 metres
Bronze	Jozef Gönci	(United States) 1996 Atlanta	Shooting	Men's 50 m rifle prone
Gold	Pavol Hochschorner; Peter Hochschorner	(Australia) 2000 Sydney	Canoeing	Men's C-2 slalom
Silver	Michal Martikán	(Australia) 2000 Sydney	Canoeing	Men's C-1 slalom
Silver	Martina Moravcová	(Australia) 2000 Sydney	Swimming	Women's 100 metre butterfly
Silver	Martina Moravcová	(Australia) 2000 Sydney	Swimming	Women's 200 metre freestyle
Bronze	Juraj Minčík	(Australia) 2000 Sydney	Canoeing	Men's C-1 slalom
Gold	Pavol Hochschorner; Peter Hochschorner	(Greece) 2004 Athens	Canoeing	Men's C-2 slalom
Gold	Elena Kaliská	(Greece) 2004 Athens	Canoeing	Women's K-1 slalom
Silver	Michal Martikán	(Greece) 2004 Athens	Canoeing	Men's C-1 slalom
Silver	Jozef Krnáč	(Greece) 2004 Athens	Judo	Men's half-lightweight
Bronze	Juraj Bača; Michal Riszdorfer; Richard Riszdorfer; Erik Vlček	(Greece) 2004 Athens	Canoeing	Men's K-4 1000 metres
Bronze	Jozef Gönci	(Greece) 2004 Athens	Shooting	Men's 10 m air rifle
Gold	Michal Martikán	(China) 2008 Beijing	Canoeing	Men's C-1 slalom
Gold	Pavol Hochschorner; Peter Hochschorner	(China) 2008 Beijing	Canoeing	Men's C-2 slalom
Gold	Elena Kaliská	(China) 2008 Beijing	Canoeing	Women's K-1 slalom
Silver	Zuzana Štefečeková	(China) 2008 Beijing	Shooting	Women's trap
Silver	Juraj Tarr; Michal Riszdorfer; Richard Riszdorfer; Erik Vlček	(China) 2008 Beijing	Canoeing	Men's K-4 1000 metres
Silver	David Musuľbes	(China) 2008 Beijing	Wrestling	Men's freestyle 120 kg
Silver	Zuzana Štefečeková	(United Kingdom) 2012 London	Shooting	Women's trap
Bronze	Michal Martikán	(United Kingdom) 2012 London	Canoeing	Men's C-1 slalom
Bronze	Pavol Hochschorner; Peter Hochschorner	(United Kingdom) 2012 London	Canoeing	Men's C-2 slalom
Bronze	Danka Barteková	(United Kingdom) 2012 London	Shooting	Women's skeet
Gold	Ladislav Škantár; Peter Škantár	(Brazil) 2016 Rio de Janeiro	Canoeing	Men's C-2 slalom
Gold	Matej Tóth	(Brazil) 2016 Rio de Janeiro	Athletics	Men's 50 km walk
Silver	Matej Beňuš	(Brazil) 2016 Rio de Janeiro	Canoeing	Men's C-1 slalom
Silver	Tibor Linka; Denis Myšák; Juraj Tarr; Erik Vlček	(Brazil) 2016 Rio de Janeiro	Canoeing	Men's K-4 1000 m
Gold	Zuzana Rehák-Štefečeková	(Japan) 2020 Tokyo	Shooting	Women's trap
Silver	Jakub Grigar	(Japan) 2020 Tokyo	Canoeing	Men's K-1 slalom
Silver	Rory Sabbatini	(Japan) 2020 Tokyo	Golf	Men's individual
Bronze	Samuel Baláž; Adam Botek; Denis Myšák; Erik Vlček	(Japan) 2020 Tokyo	Canoeing	Men's K-4 500 m
Bronze	Matej Beňuš	(France) 2024 Paris	Canoeing	Men's C-1 slalom

=== Winter Games ===
Medal	Name	Games	Sport	Event
Silver	Radoslav Židek	(Italy) 2006 Turin	Snowboarding	Men's snowboard cross
Gold	Anastasiya Kuzmina	(Canada) 2010 Vancouver	Biathlon	Women's sprint
Silver	Anastasiya Kuzmina	(Canada) 2010 Vancouver	Biathlon	Women's pursuit
Silver	Pavol Hurajt	(Canada) 2010 Vancouver	Biathlon	Men's mass start
Gold	Anastasiya Kuzmina	(Russia) 2014 Sochi	Biathlon	Women's sprint
Gold	Anastasiya Kuzmina	(South Korea) 2018 Pyeongchang	Biathlon	Women's mass start
Silver	Anastasiya Kuzmina	(South Korea) 2018 Pyeongchang	Biathlon	Women's pursuit
Silver	Anastasiya Kuzmina	(South Korea) 2018 Pyeongchang	Biathlon	Women's individual
Gold	Petra Vlhová	(China) 2022 Beijing	Alpine skiing	Women's slalom
Bronze	Ice hockey team Branislav Konrád; Patrik Rybár; Matej Tomek; Michal Čajkovský; Peter Čerešňák; Marek Ďaloga; Martin Gernát; Samuel Kňažko; Martin Marinčin; Šimon Nemec; Mislav Rosandić; Peter Cehlárik; Marko Daňo; Adrián Holešinský; Marek Hrivík; Libor Hudáček; Tomáš Jurčo; Miloš Kelemen; Michal Krištof; Kristián Pospíšil; Pavol Regenda; Miloš Roman; Juraj Slafkovský; Samuel Takáč; Peter Zuzin	(China) 2022 Beijing	Ice hockey	Men's tournament

== Most successful Slovak competitors ==
Individual athletes

No	Athlete	Sport	1st place, gold medalist(s)	2nd place, silver medalist(s)	3rd place, bronze medalist(s)	Total
1	Anastasiya Kuzmina	Biathlon	3	3	0	6
2	Pavol Hochschorner; Peter Hochschorner	Canoeing	3	0	1	4
3	Michal Martikán	Canoeing	2	2	1	5
4	Elena Kaliská	Canoeing	2	0	0	2
5	Zuzana Štefečeková	Shooting	1	2	0	3
6	Erik Vlček	Canoeing	0	2	2	4
7	Martina Moravcová	Swimming	0	2	0	2
8	Matej Beňuš	Canoeing	0	1	1	2
9	Jozef Gönci	Shooting	0	0	2	2

Teams

No	Team	Sport	1st place, gold medalist(s)	2nd place, silver medalist(s)	3rd place, bronze medalist(s)	Total
1	Men's K-4	Canoeing	0	2	2	4

== List of Slovak medalists – Czechoslovakia (1920–1992) ==
=== Summer Games ===
Medal	Name	Games	Sport	Event
Silver	Jozef Herda	1936 Berlin	Wrestling	Men's Greco-Roman lightweight
Silver	Matylda Pálfyová	1936 Berlin	Gymnastics	Women's team all round
Gold	Július Torma	1948 London	Boxing	Boxing - Welterweight
Gold	Ján Zachara	1952 Helsinki	Boxing	Boxing - Featherweight
Bronze	Mikuláš Athanasov	1952 Helsinki	Wrestling	Men's Greco-Roman lightweight
Gold	Pavel Schmidt	1960 Rome	Rowing	Rowing - Men's double sculls
Silver	Marianna Krajčírová; Jana Kubičková	1964 Tokyo	Gymnastics	Women's team all round
Silver	Ľudovít Cvetler; Ján Geleta; Vojtech Masný; Štefan Matlák; Ivan Mráz; Anton Švajlen; Anton Urban; Vladimír Weiss	1964 Tokyo	Football	Men's team competition
Bronze	Bohumil Golian	1964 Tokyo	Volleyball	Men's team competition
Silver	Marianna Krajčírová; Jana Kubičková	1968 Mexico City	Gymnastics	Women's team all round
Silver	Bohumil Golian	1968 Mexico City	Volleyball	Men's team competition
Silver	Vincent Lafko; Andrej Lukošík; Peter Pospíšil	1972 Munich	Handball	Men's team competition
Bronze	Eva Šuranová	1972 Munich	Athletics	Women's Long Jump
Gold	Anton Tkáč	1976 Montreal	Cycling	Men's 1000m Sprint (Scratch)
Gold	František Kunzo; Stanislav Seman	1980 Moscow	Football	Men's team competition
Silver	Imrich Bugár	1980 Moscow	Athletics	Men's discus throw
Silver	Alena Kyselicová; Viera Podhányiová; Iveta Šranková	1980 Moscow	Field hockey	Women's team competition
Bronze	Dušan Poliačik	1980 Moscow	Weightlifting	Men's light heavyweight
Bronze	Ján Franek	1980 Moscow	Boxing	Men's light middleweight
Bronze	Dan Karabin	1980 Moscow	Wrestling	Men's freestyle welterweight
Bronze	Július Strnisko	1980 Moscow	Wrestling	Men's freestyle heavyweight
Gold	Jozef Pribilinec	1988 Seoul	Athletics	Men's 20 km Walk
Gold	Miloslav Mečíř	1988 Seoul	Tennis	Men's Singles Competition
Bronze	Miloslav Mečíř	1988 Seoul	Tennis	Men's Doubles Competition
Bronze	Jozef Lohyňa	1988 Seoul	Wrestling	Men's freestyle middleweight

=== Winter Games ===
Medal	Name	Games	Sport	Event
Silver	Ladislav Troják	1948 St. Moritz	Ice hockey	Men's team competition
Silver	Karol Divín	1960 Squaw Valley	Figure skating	Men's singles
Bronze	Vladimír Dzurilla; František Gregor; Jozef Golonka	1964 Innsbruck	Ice hockey	Men's team competition
Silver	Vladimír Dzurilla; Jozef Golonka	1968 Grenoble	Ice hockey	Men's team competition
Gold	Ondrej Nepela	1972 Sapporo	Figure skating	Men's singles
Bronze	Vladimír Dzurilla; Rudolf Tajcnár	1972 Sapporo	Ice hockey	Men's team competition
Silver	Igor Liba; Vincent Lukáč; Dušan Pašek; Dárius Rusnák	1984 Sarajevo	Ice hockey	Men's team competition
Silver	Gabriela Svobodová	1984 Sarajevo	Cross-country skiing	Women's 4 x 5 km relay
Bronze	Jozef Sabovčík	1984 Sarajevo	Figure skating	Men's singles
Bronze	Igor Liba; Róbert Švehla; Peter Veselovský; Jaromír Dragan	1992 Albertville	Ice hockey	Men's team competition

== See also ==
- List of flag bearers for Slovakia at the Olympics
- Slovakia at the Youth Olympics
- Slovakia at the Paralympics
- Slovakia at the European Youth Olympic Festival
- Slovakia at the European Games
- Slovakia at the Universiade
- Slovakia at the World Games
- Category:Olympic competitors for Slovakia
