= Rygel =

Rygel may refer to:

- Daniel Rygel the son of Zdeněk Rygel
- Dominar Rygel XVI a character from Farscape
