= Vally Weigl =

Austrian-American Composer

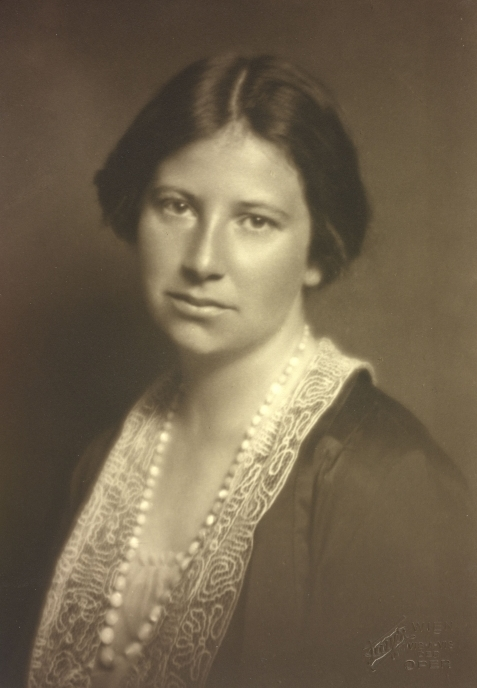

Background information
- Born: Valerie Pick; September 11, 1894; Vienna
- Died: December 25, 1982 (aged 88) New York City, New York, U.S.
- Genres: Classical
- Occupations: Composer; music therapist; educator
- Instrument: Piano
- Award: National Endowment for the Arts grant

Vally Weigl (11 September 1894 – 25 December 1982) was an Austrian-American composer and music therapist.

== Biography ==
Valerie Weigl (née Pick) was born in Vienna, Austria. She was the first daughter of a Jewish couple, lawyer Josef Pick (1849, Náchod – 1926, Vienna) and his wife Charlotte "Lotte", née Rubinstein (1871, Galați – 1939, Vienna). Her younger sister was an Austrian economist, women's rights activist, journalist and politician Käthe Leichter.

Vally took piano lessons in childhood and studied musicology at Vienna University. She studied piano under Richard Robert, composition under Karl Weigl and musicology under Guido Adler.

Vally married Karl Weigl in 1921, and after the National Socialists took power in Austria in 1938, the couple emigrated with their son to the U.S. with assistance from the Quaker Society of Friends. In New York, Weigl worked as a music teacher and composer, and a grant from the National Endowment for the Arts allowed her to compose and record Nature's Moods, New England Suite, and four song cycles. After receiving a master's degree at Columbia University, she also worked as a music therapist and became chief medical therapist at New York Medical College. She also taught at Roosevelt Cerebral Palsy School. Vally directed research projects at Mount Sinai Hospital's psychiatric division and the Hebrew Home for the Aged, and in the 1950s published a number of articles in the field of musical therapy. She died in New York City in 1982.

A biography of Vally Weigl entitled Give Them Music was published in 2003.

== Works ==
Vally Weigl composed a large number of works for orchestra and solo instruments. She enjoyed an extensive discography. Selected works include:

- Toccatina pour piano
- Nature Moods for Tenor, Clarinet and Violin
- New England Suite for Clarinet, Violoncello and Piano
- Songs of Remembrance (Poèmes de Emily Dickinson)
- Dear Earth for baritone, horn, violin, cello, and piano, words by Frederika Blankner
- Brief Encounters for clarinet, horn, bassoon, and oboe
- Songs of Love and Leaving for mezzo-soprano, baritone, clarinet and piano, words by Carl Sandburg
- Echoes from Poems
- Lyrical Suite for voice, piano, flute and cello
- Songs from "Do not Awake Me"
- Songs from "No Boundary" for voice, piano, flute and cello
- Songs Newly Seen in the Dusk
- Songs of Remembrance
- Requiem for Allison
- In Springtime pour voix et piano
- Songs from "No Boundary" pour voix, piano, flûte et violoncelle
- Oiseau de la vie pour flûte
- Lyrical Suite pour voix, piano, flûte et violoncelle
- Old Time Burlesque pour alto et piano
