= Rousek =

Rousek (Czech feminine: Rousková) is a Czech surname. Notable people with the surname include:

- Lukáš Rousek (born 1999), Czech ice hockey player
- Tomáš Rousek (born 1993), Czech ice hockey player
- Zdeňka Rousková-Padevětová (born 1958), Czech archer
