= Černolice =

- Municipality
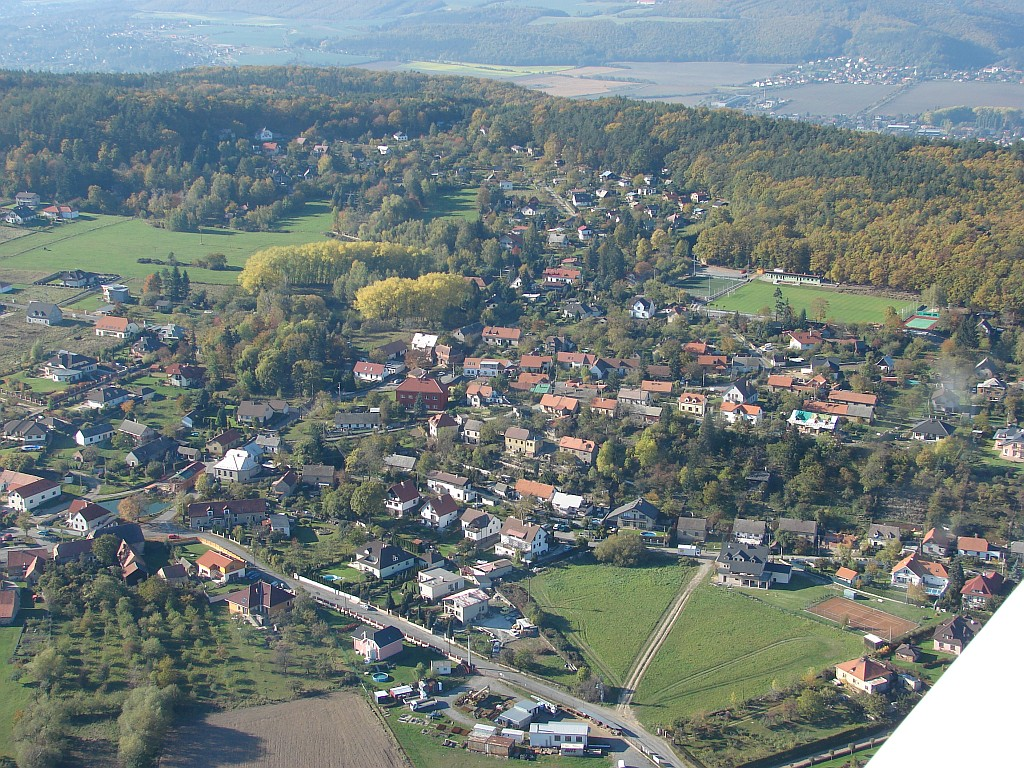
- Aerial view

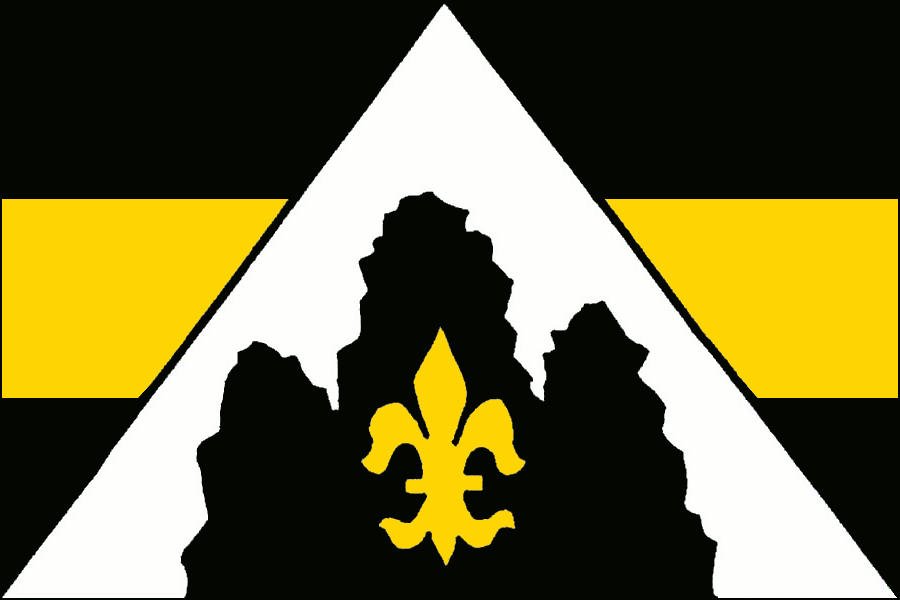
- Flag Coat of arms

- Location in the Czech Republic
- Coordinates: 49°54′35″N 14°17′58″E
- Country: Czech Republic
- Region: Central Bohemian
- District: Prague-West
- First mentioned: 1239

Area
  - Total: 3.19 km^{2} (1.23 sq mi)
- Elevation: 410 m (1,350 ft)

Population (2026-01-01)
  - Total: 591
  - Density: 185/km^{2} (480/sq mi)
- Time zone: UTC+1 (CET)
  - Summer (DST): UTC+2 (CEST)
- Postal code: 252 10
- Website: cernolice.net

Černolice is a municipality and village in Prague-West District in the Central Bohemian Region of the Czech Republic. It has about 600 inhabitants.

== Demographics ==
Historical population
| Year | Pop. | ±% |
|---|---|---|
| 1869 | 372 | — |
| 1880 | 401 | +7.8% |
| 1890 | 411 | +2.5% |
| 1900 | 392 | −4.6% |
| 1910 | 385 | −1.8% |
| 1921 | 354 | −8.1% |
| 1930 | 406 | +14.7% |
| 1950 | 355 | −12.6% |
| 1961 | 301 | −15.2% |
| 1970 | 262 | −13.0% |
| 1980 | 198 | −24.4% |
| 1991 | 149 | −24.7% |
| 2001 | 179 | +20.1% |
| 2011 | 343 | +91.6% |
| 2021 | 561 | +63.6% |
Source: Censuses

== Notable people ==
- Luděk Macela (1950–2016), footballer
