= Andrea Porsch =

Austrian field hockey player

Personal information
- Nationality: Austrian
- Born: 6 October 1959 (age 66) Vienna, Austria

Sport
- Sport: Field hockey

Andrea Porsch (born 6 October 1959) is an Austrian field hockey player. She competed in the women's tournament at the 1980 Summer Olympics.
