= Vojkovice (Frýdek-Místek District) =

- Municipality
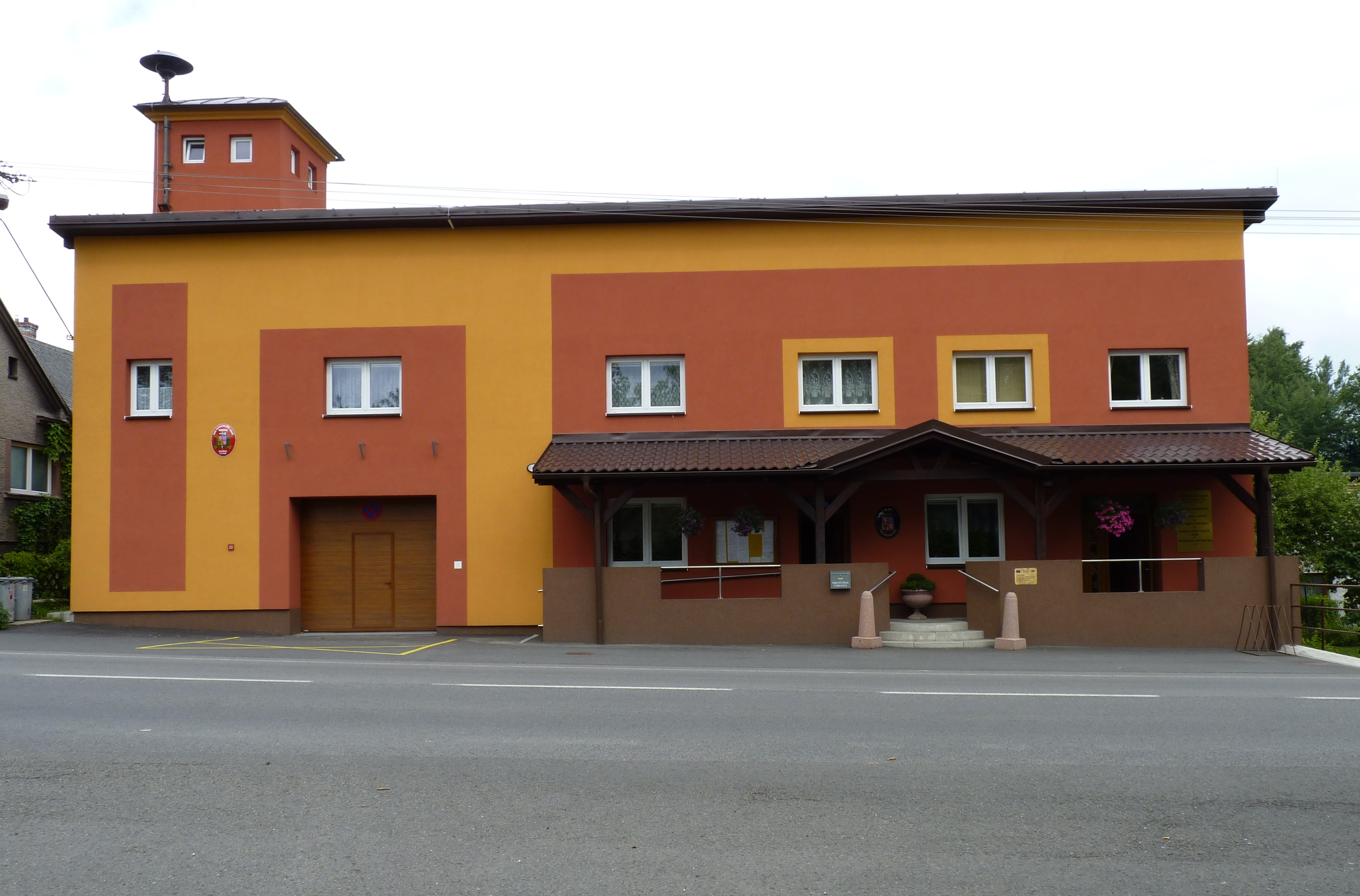
- Municipal office

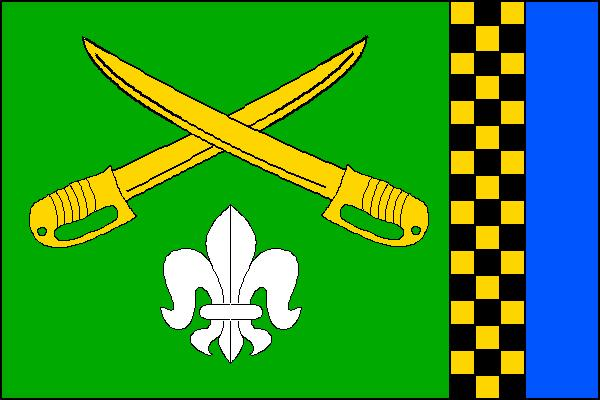
- Flag Coat of arms

- Location in the Czech Republic
- Coordinates: 49°40′56″N 18°28′5″E
- Country: Czech Republic
- Region: Moravian-Silesian
- District: Frýdek-Místek
- First mentioned: 1584

Area
  - Total: 4.88 km^{2} (1.88 sq mi)
- Elevation: 315 m (1,033 ft)

Population (2026-01-01)
  - Total: 800
  - Density: 160/km^{2} (420/sq mi)
- Time zone: UTC+1 (CET)
  - Summer (DST): UTC+2 (CEST)
- Postal code: 739 51
- Website: www.vojkovice.eu

Vojkovice (Polish: Wojkowice, German: Wojkowitz) is a municipality and village in the Frýdek-Místek District in the Moravian-Silesian Region of the Czech Republic. It has about 800 inhabitants.

== Etymology ==
The name Vojkovice is probably derived from someone named Vojtěch, who was the probable founder the village.

== Geography ==
Vojkovice is located about 7 kilometres (4 mi) east of Frýdek-Místek and 18 km (11 mi) southeast of Ostrava. It lies in the Moravian-Silesian Foothills in the historical region of Cieszyn Silesia. The highest point is at 360 m (1,181 ft) above sea level. The Lučina River flows through the municipality.

== History ==
Vojkovice was founded around 1500, certainly before 1520. The first written mention is from 1573, when it was part of Frýdek state country. The inhabitants subsisted mainly on weaving, agriculture, and hauling merchant carts up the hills.

== Demographics ==
Historical population

Year	Pop.	±%
1869	515	—
1880	473	−8.2%
1890	389	−17.8%
1900	398	+2.3%
1910	427	+7.3%

Year	Pop.	±%
1921	470	+10.1%
1930	497	+5.7%
1950	485	−2.4%
1961	552	+13.8%
1970	535	−3.1%

Year	Pop.	±%
1980	502	−6.2%
1991	465	−7.4%
2001	495	+6.5%
2011	561	+13.3%
2021	710	+26.6%

Source: Censuses

== Transport ==
The D48 motorway (part of the European route E462) from Frýdek-Místek to Český Těšín runs through the southern part of the municipality.

== Sights ==
The only protected cultural monument in the municipality is a statue of Saint Francis of Assisi from the 18th century.

== Notable people ==
- Lubomír Pokluda (born 1958), footballer
