= Miroslava Skleničková =

Czech gymnast

Medal record

Women's gymnastics

Representing Czechoslovakia

Olympic Games
Silver medal – second place	1968 Mexico City	Team

Miroslava Skleničková (born 11 March 1951, in Karlovy Vary), also known as Miroslava Denková, is a Czech former gymnast who competed for Czechoslovakia in the 1968 Summer Olympics.
