= Adolfína Tkačíková-Tačová =

Czech gymnast

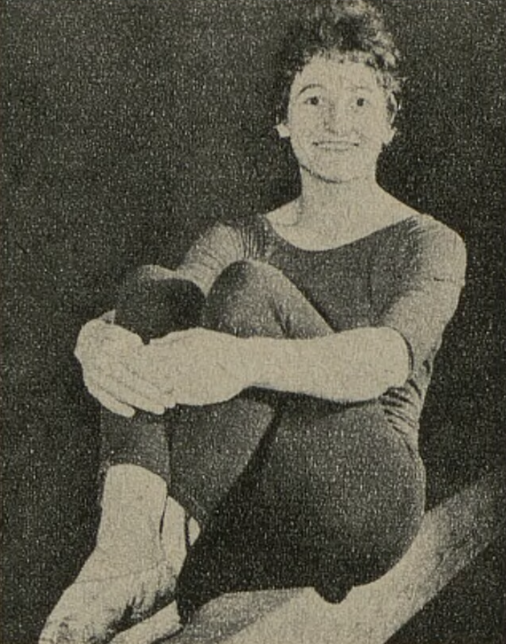
- 1960

Personal information
- Born: 19 April 1939 (age 87) Petřkovice

Sport
- Country: Czechoslovakia
- Sport: Artistic gymnastics
Medal record
Women's gymnastics
Representing Czechoslovakia
Olympic Games
Silver medal – second place	1960 Rome	Team
Silver medal – second place	1964 Tokyo	Team

Adolfína Tkačíková-Tačová (born 19 April 1939 in Petřkovice) is a Czech former gymnast who competed for Czechoslovakia in the 1960 Summer Olympics and in the 1964 Summer Olympics.
