= Brigitte Kindler =

Austrian field hockey player

Personal information
- Nationality: Austrian
- Born: 31 August 1957 (age 68) Vienna, Austria

Sport
- Sport: Field hockey

Brigitte Kindler (born 31 August 1957) is an Austrian field hockey player. She competed in the women's tournament at the 1980 Summer Olympics.
