= Třebotov =

- Municipality
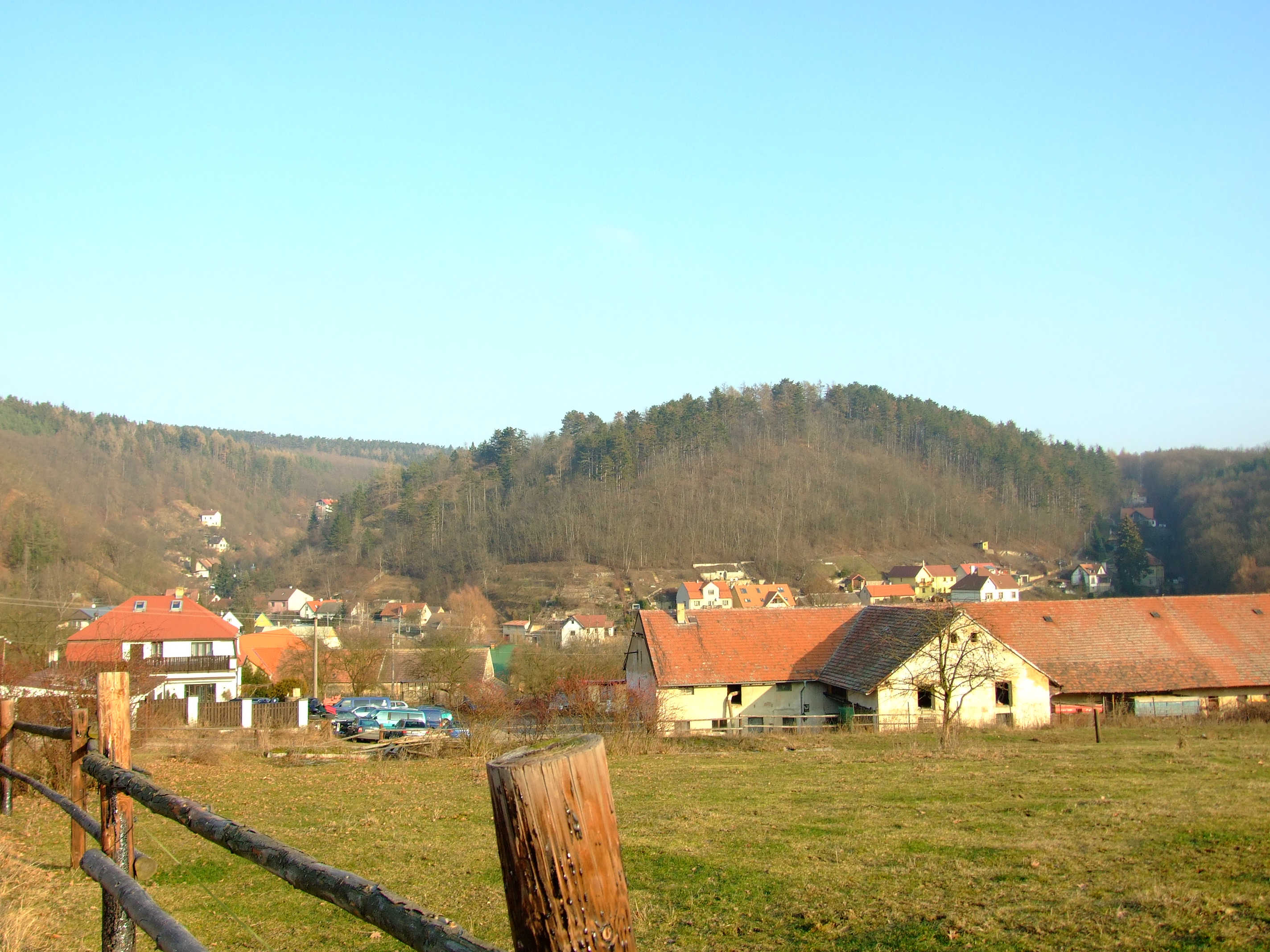
- Solopisky, a part of Třebotov

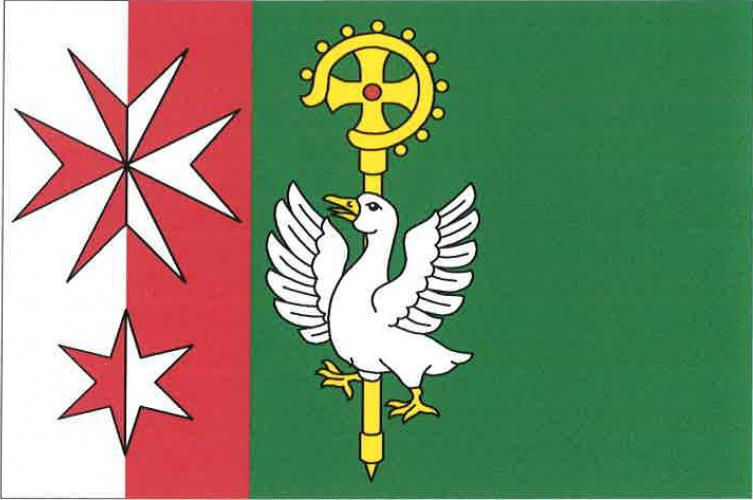
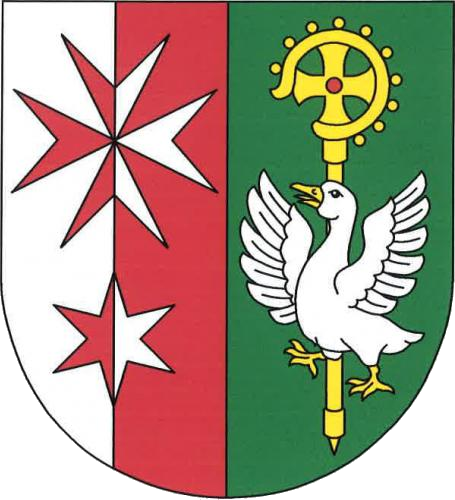
- Flag Coat of arms

- Location in the Czech Republic
- Coordinates: 49°58′21″N 14°17′29″E
- Country: Czech Republic
- Region: Central Bohemian
- District: Prague-West
- First mentioned: 1253

Area
  - Total: 6.89 km^{2} (2.66 sq mi)
- Elevation: 350 m (1,150 ft)

Population (2026-01-01)
  - Total: 1,531
  - Density: 222/km^{2} (576/sq mi)
- Time zone: UTC+1 (CET)
  - Summer (DST): UTC+2 (CEST)
- Postal codes: 252 26, 252 28
- Website: www.obectrebotov.cz

Třebotov is a municipality and village in Prague-West District in the Central Bohemian Region of the Czech Republic. It has about 1,500 inhabitants.

== Administrative division ==
Třebotov consists of three municipal parts (in brackets population according to the 2021 census):

- Třebotov (1,334)
- Kala (28)
- Solopisky (244)

== Etymology ==
The name is derived from the personal name Třebota, meaning "Třebota's (court)".

== Geography ==
Třebotov is located about 9 kilometres (6 mi) southwest of Prague. It lies in the Prague Plateau. The highest point is the hill Kulivá hora at 390 m (1,280 ft) above sea level. The entire municipality lies in the Bohemian Karst Protected Landscape Area.

== History ==
The first written mention of Třebotov is in a deed of King Wenceslaus I from 1253.

== Demographics ==
Historical population

Year	Pop.	±%
1869	794	—
1880	832	+4.8%
1890	855	+2.8%
1900	885	+3.5%
1910	855	−3.4%

Year	Pop.	±%
1921	861	+0.7%
1930	1,001	+16.3%
1950	1,049	+4.8%
1961	985	−6.1%
1970	910	−7.6%

Year	Pop.	±%
1980	1,006	+10.5%
1991	948	−5.8%
2001	996	+5.1%
2011	1,321	+32.6%
2021	1,606	+21.6%

Source: Censuses

== Transport ==
There are no railways or major roads passing through the municipality.

== Sights ==
The main landmark of Třebotov is the Church of Saint Martin. The original church was first mentioned in 1352 and probably dated from around 1300. Due to poor condition and architectural worthlessness, it was demolished. The current pseudo-Romanesque church was built on its site in 1867.

== Notable people ==
- Hana Růžičková (1941–1981), gymnast, Olympic medalist
