= Käthe Leichter =

Austrian writer (1895–1942)

Käthe Leichter

Marianne Katharina "Käthe" Leichter (20 August 1895 in Vienna, Austria – February 1942) was an Austrian Jewish economist, women's rights activist, journalist and politician. She was a member of the Social Democratic Party of Austria and the Viennese Labour Chamber. She was detained in Ravensbrück concentration camp during the Nazi regime and killed by gas at the Bernburg Euthanasia Centre in 1942.

== Early life ==
Leichter was born Marianne Katharina Pick in 1895 in Vienna, the second daughter of a Jewish couple, lawyer Josef Pick (1849, Náchod–1926) and his wife Charlotte "Lotte" Rubinstein (1871, Galați–1939). Her older sister was the Austrian-American composer and music therapist Vally Weigl.

Käthe graduated from the Beamten-Töchter-Lyceum in 1914 and subsequently began studying political science at the University of Vienna. Since, at the time, Austrian women were not allowed to graduate, she transferred to the German Heidelberg University in 1917; she graduated in July 1918 before returning to Vienna to complete two further semesters at the university.

== Political career ==
Leichter became involved in the Wiener Jugendbewegung (Viennese Youth Movement), a radical left-wing organisation, as a student prior to the outbreak of World War I, and was later a member of the Parteischüler-Bildungsverein Karl Marx (Karl Marx Association for Party Scholars and Education), a Marxist group for Social Democratic Party of Austria (SDAPÖ) members who opposed the war. When the Republic of Austria was founded in 1918, and as one of the first Austrian women political science graduates to have specialised in economics, she joined the Reichswirtschaftskommission der Arbeiterräte (State Economic Committee of the Workers' Councils), Sozialisierungskommission (State Committee for the Socialisation of Industry) and the Zentralverband für Gemeinwirtschaft (Central Organisation for Public Goods and Corporations), as well as working for the Ministry of Finance.

Leichter joined the Frauenreferat der Wiener Arbeiterkammer (Women's Department of the Viennese Institutionalised Workers' Chamber) in 1925 and led the department until 1934. She was elected to the Betriebsrat der Wiener Arbeitkammer (Workers' Committee of the Viennese Institutionalised Workers' Chamber) in 1932. She published articles and reports based on statistical data that she gathered about women's work in Austria, and also gave lectures, school courses and radio broadcasts to advocate for women's rights. She argued for equal pay, the hiring of more women in social administration, and employment opportunities for university-educated women.

== Personal life ==
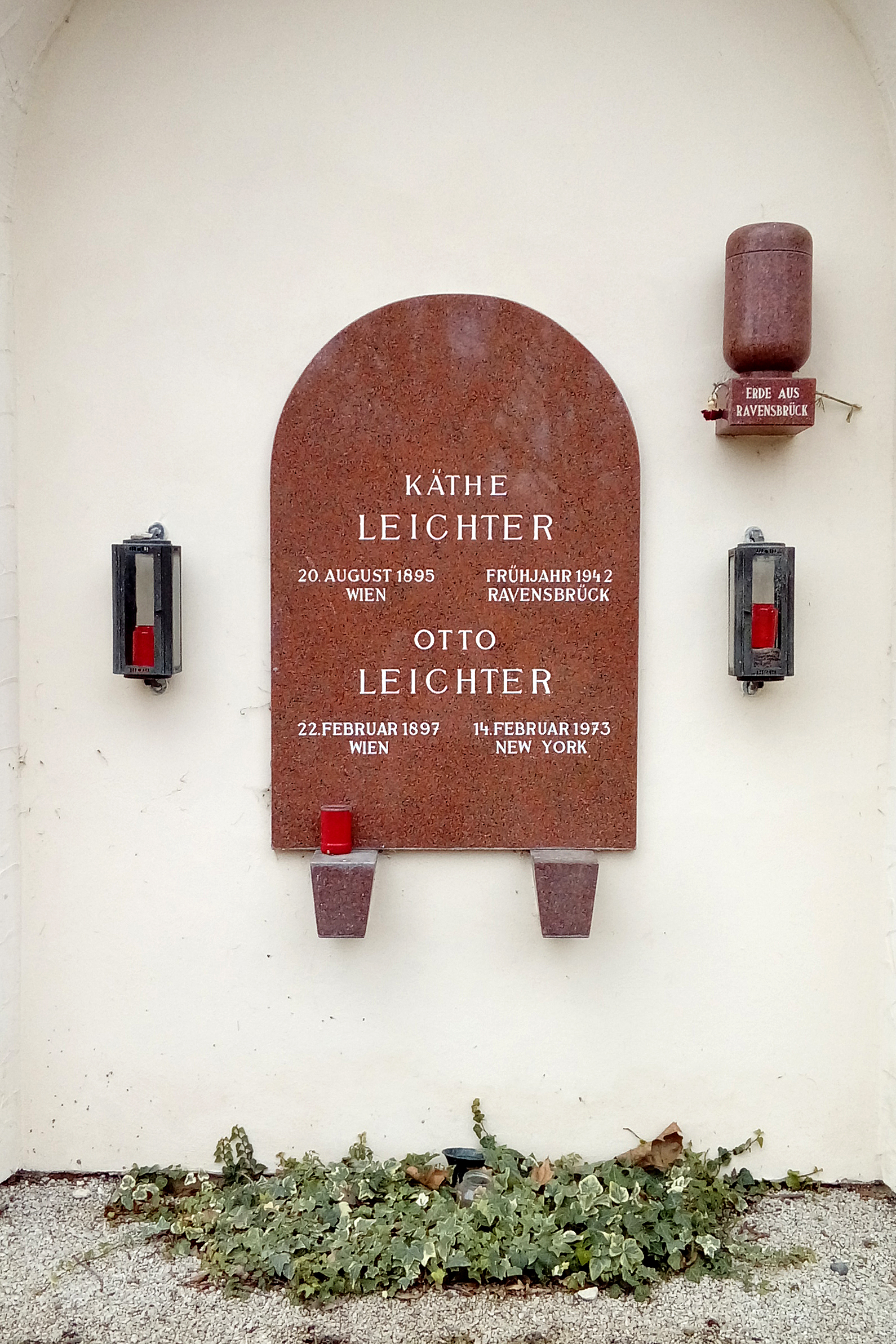
Feuerhalle Simmering, Leichter family grave

She married Otto Leichter, a fellow socialist and journalist, in 1921. She gave birth to their first son, Heinz, in 1924 and their second, Franz, in 1930.

== Political persecution and death ==
When the SDAPÖ was banned in Austria in February 1934, Leichter joined the Revolutionäre Sozialisten (Revolutionary Socialists), an underground socialist organisation that had been formed in response to the party ban. She and her husband Otto migrated to Zürich in exile for six months in 1934, but returned to Vienna when she was elected the Revolutionary Socialists' chair of education. She wrote anti-fascist pamphlets and published articles abroad under the pseudonyms Maria Mahler and Anna Gärtner. After the Nazi Party invaded Austria in the 1938 Anschluss, she attempted to flee Austria with her family; although her family escaped, Leichter was arrested by the Gestapo in Vienna on 30 May 1938 and subsequently imprisoned. She was sent to Ravensbrück concentration camp in 1940 and was killed by gas at the Bernburg Euthanasia Centre in early 1942. An urn at Feuerhalle Simmering filled with earth from Ravensbrück concentration camp serves as her cenotaph in Vienna.

== Legacy ==
Käthe-Leichter-Gasse, a street in the Hietzing district of Vienna, was named after Leichter in 1949. An annual prize awarded by the Austrian government to a woman historian is also named in Leichter's memory. Austrian-American historian Gerda Lerner wrote that Leichter "personifies the highest ideals of feminism—lifelong activity on behalf of all women, but especially working-class women; conviction that social reforms are only just if they serve the interests of women as well as men; uncompromising struggle against fascism and National Socialism, which cost her life."

== Relatives ==
Käthe Leichter's maternal relatives are

- Jacques Rubinstein, Yiddish: יעקב רובינשטיין (1841, Yareslov (Jarosław), Royal Galicia-Lodomeria–1912, Vienna, Austria-Hungary)
  ∞ Henriette Rosenfeld, (Yiddish: הענריעטטע רויזענפעלד, Hebrew: הנרייטה רוזנפלד) (1848, Pöstyén (German: Pistyan, Pistian, Püschtin, Bad Püschtin, Piešťany), Nyitra Co. Royal Hungary–1934, Vienna, Austria), and had the following children:
  - Charlotte "Lotte" Rubinstein (married Käthe Leichter's father Josef Pick)
  - Caroline Friederike Rubinstein (married name Landau)
  - Helene Rubinstein (married name Kux)
  - Heinrich Rubinstein
  - Artur Rubinstein

== Bibliography ==
- Frauenarbeit und Arbeiterinnenschutz in Österreich, 1927
- Wie leben die Wiener Heimarbeiter? : eine Erhebung über die Arbeits- und Lebensverhältnisse von tausend Wiener Heimarbeitern, 1923
- So leben wir ... 1320 Industriearbeiterinnen berichten über ihr Leben ; Eine Erhebung, 1932
- Käthe Leichter. Leben und Werk, 1973
- Käthe Leichter zum 100. Geburtstag : Texte zur Frauenpolitik, 1995
