= Elisabeth Pistauer =

Austrian field hockey player

Personal information
- Nationality: Austrian
- Born: 11 April 1955 (age 71) Vienna, Austria

Sport
- Sport: Field hockey

Elisabeth Pistauer (born 11 April 1955) is an Austrian field hockey player. She competed in the women's tournament at the 1980 Summer Olympics.
