= Nisha Sharma (field hockey) =

Indian hockey player (born 1959)

Personal information
- Nationality: Indian
- Born: 1 June 1959 (age 67)

Sport
- Sport: Field hockey

Nisha Sharma (born 1 June 1959) is an Indian field hockey player. She competed in the women's tournament at the 1980 Summer Olympics.
