= Ján Repák =

Slovak volleyball player (1956–2021)

Personal information
- Nationality: Slovak
- Born: 18 February 1956; Zákopčie, Czechoslovakia
- Died: 12 May 2021 (aged 65); Bratislava, Slovakia

Sport
- Sport: Volleyball

Ján Repák (18 February 1956 – 12 May 2021) was a Slovak volleyball player. He competed in the men's tournament at the 1980 Summer Olympics.
