= Daniel Rygel =

Czech footballer

Personal information
- Full name: Daniel Rygel
- Date of birth: 16 November 1979 (age 46)
- Place of birth: Czechoslovakia
- Position: Midfielder

Senior career*
Years	Team	Apps	(Gls)
1998–1999	Baník Ostrava	0	(0)
1999–2000	Dukla Hranice		
2000–2003	Bohemians Praha	12	(0)
2001	→ Sokol Semice (loan)	4	(2)
2001	→ Xaverov (loan)	7	(0)
2002–2003	→ Spolana Neratovice (loan)	12	(0)
2003–2004	Vítkovice	14	(4)
2003–2004	AS Trenčín	6	(0)
2004–2007	Vítkovice	60	(4)
2007–2010	Odra Wodzisław	35	(1)
2010	→ Vítkovice (loan)	9	(1)
2010–2011	Sankt Peter in der Au	28	(6)
2011–2013	Schaubach Pyhra		
2013	Hainfeld		
2014	Schaubach Pyhra		
2014–2016	Neustadtl		
- * Club domestic league appearances and goals

Daniel Rygel (born 16 November 1979) is a Czech former professional footballer who played as a midfielder. He appeared in 12 Gambrinus liga games for Bohemians Prague. He is the son of footballer Zdeněk Rygel.
