= Josef Novotný =

Czech volleyball player (born 1956)

Personal information
- Nationality: Czech
- Born: 29 March 1956 (age 68); Malšovice, Czechoslovakia

Sport
- Sport: Volleyball

Josef Novotný (born 29 March 1956) is a Czech volleyball player. He competed in the men's tournament at the 1980 Summer Olympics.
