= Juraj Benčík =

Slovak racewalker

Personal information
- Nationality: Slovak
- Born: 15 February 1945 (age 81)

Sport
- Sport: Athletics
- Event: Racewalking

Juraj Benčík (born 15 February 1945) is a Slovak racewalker. He competed in the men's 20 kilometres walk at the 1980 Summer Olympics.

Later he worked as a coach of Czechoslovakia's and Slovakia's race walker, including Olympic champion Jozef Pribilinec or Matej Tóth.

According to archive files he was a informer of the communist State Security (StB), giving her reports even after the Velvet Revolution in December 1989.

In 2026, Minister of Sport Rudolf Huliak named him his advisor in the Fund for Sports Support.
