= Cyril Krejčí =

Czech volleyball player (born 1957)

Personal information
- Nationality: Czech
- Born: 18 May 1957 (age 67); Havlíčkův Brod, Czechoslovakia

Sport
- Sport: Volleyball

Cyril Krejčí (born 18 May 1957) is a Czech volleyball player. He competed in the men's tournament at the 1980 Summer Olympics.
