= Andrej Lukošík =

Slovak handball player (born 1947)

Medal record

Men's handball

Representing Czechoslovakia

Olympic Games
Silver medal – second place	1972 Munich	Team competition

Andrej Lukošík (born 5 October 1947 in Levoča) is a Slovak handball player who competed for Czechoslovakia in the 1972 Summer Olympics.

He was part of the Czechoslovak team which won the silver medal at the Munich Games. He played four matches including the final and scored one goal.
