= Jaroslav Kopet =

Czech volleyball player (born 1952)

Personal information
- Nationality: Czech
- Born: 5 December 1952 (age 72); Teplá, Czechoslovakia

Sport
- Sport: Volleyball

Jaroslav Kopet (born 5 December 1952) is a Czech volleyball player. He competed in the men's tournament at the 1980 Summer Olympics.
