= Pavel Valach =

Czech volleyball player (born 1953)

Personal information
- Nationality: Czech
- Born: 26 October 1953 (age 71); Česká Lípa, Czechoslovakia

Sport
- Sport: Volleyball

Pavel Valach (born 26 October 1953) is a Czech volleyball player. He competed in the men's tournament at the 1980 Summer Olympics.
