= Jan Klapáč =

Czech ice hockey player

Medal record

Men's ice hockey

Representing Czechoslovakia

Olympic Games
| Silver medal – second place | 1968 Grenoble | |
| Bronze medal – third place | 1964 Innsbruck | |

World Championships
| Bronze medal – third place | 1964 Innsbruck | |
| Silver medal – second place | 1965 Tampere | |
| Silver medal – second place | 1966 Ljubljana | |
| Silver medal – second place | 1968 Grenoble | |
| Bronze medal – third place | 1969 Stockholm, Ljubljana, Skopje | |
| Gold medal – first place | 1972 Prague | |
| Bronze medal – third place | 1973 Moscow | |

Jan Klapáč (born February 27, 1941) is a Czech former professional ice hockey player, born in Prague, Protectorate of Bohemia and Moravia. He is the grandfather of alpine skier and snowboarder Ester Ledecká.
