= Hana Růžičková =

Czech gymnast

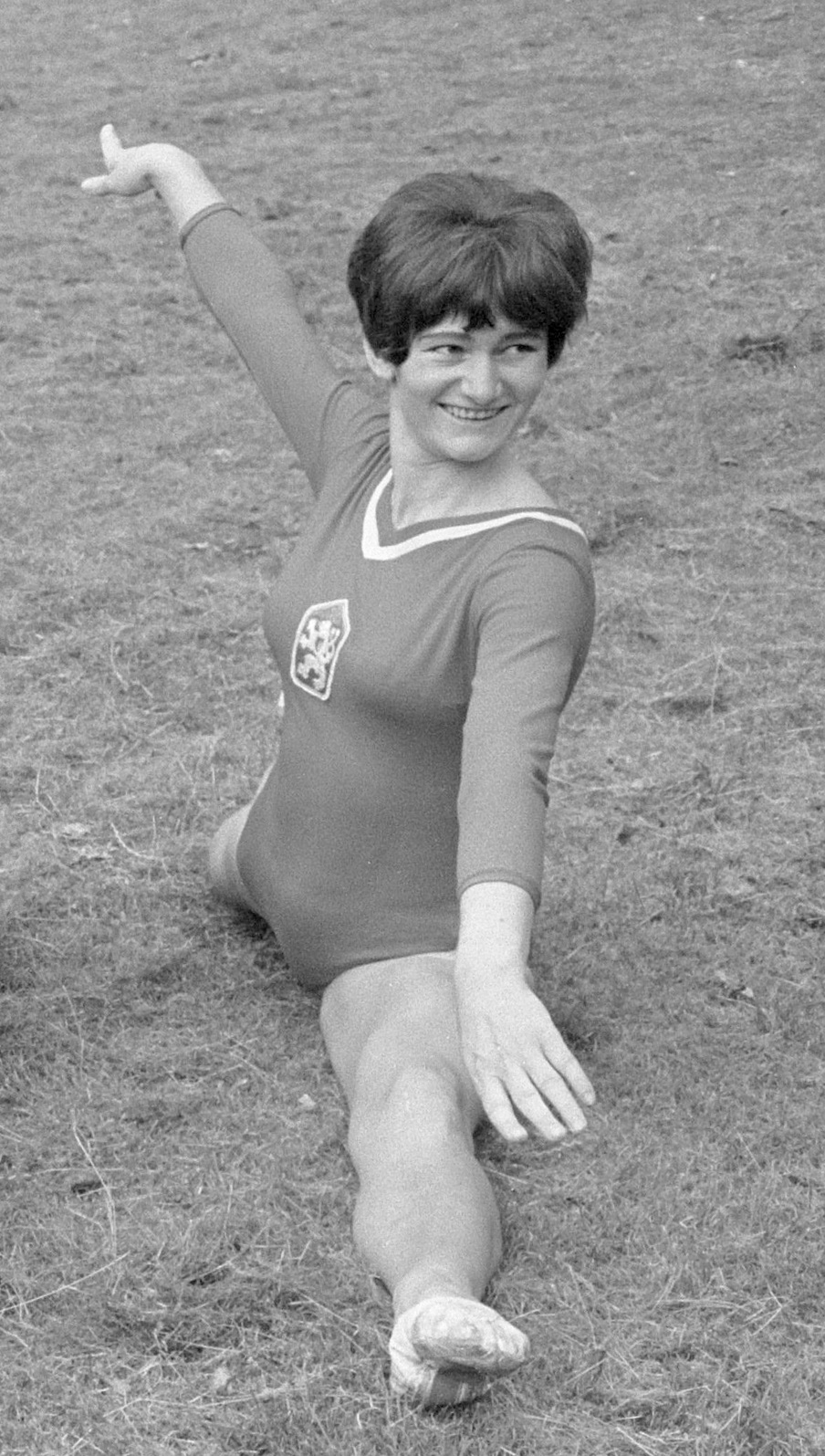
- Růžičková in 1966

Personal information
- Born: 18 February 1941 Třebotov, Protectorate of Bohemia and Moravia
- Died: 29 May 1981 (aged 40) Prague, Czechoslovakia
- Height: 1.62 m (5 ft 4 in)

Gymnastics career
- Discipline: Women's artistic gymnastics
Medal record
Representing Czechoslovakia
Olympic Games
Silver medal – second place	1960 Rome	Team
Silver medal – second place	1964 Tokyo	Team
World Championships
Silver medal – second place	1962 Prague	Team

Hana Růžičková (18 February 1941 – 29 May 1981) was a Czech gymnast. She was part of Czech teams that won silver medals at the 1960 and in the 1964 Summer Olympics. Her best individual results were fifth place in the all-around in 1964 and fifth place on the balance beam in 1964.
