= Jaromír Holub =

Czech fencer (born 1954)

Personal information
- Born: 17 December 1954 (age 71) Mariánské Lázně, Czechoslovakia

Sport
- Sport: Fencing

Jaromír Holub (born 17 December 1954) is a Czech fencer. He competed in the team épée event at the 1980 Summer Olympics.
