= Vlado Sirvoň =

Slovak volleyball player (born 1951)

Vladimír Sirvoň
Personal information
- Nationality: Slovak
- Born: 8 July 1951 (age 74) Myjava, Czechoslovakia

Sport
- Sport: Volleyball

Vladimír Sirvoň (born 8 July 1951) is a Slovak volleyball player. He competed in the men's tournament at the 1980 Summer Olympics.
