= Zdeňka Rousková-Padevětová =

Czech archer (born 1958)

Zdeňka Rousková-Padevětová (born 12 December 1958) is a Czech former archer. She represented Czechoslovakia at the 1980 Summer Olympic Games.

== Life ==
Zdeňka Padevětová was born on 12 December 1958 in Helsinki, Finland. After she married, she became known as Rousková-Padevětová or just Rousková.

Padevětová competed at the 1980 Summer Olympic Games in the women's individual event and finished fourth with a score of 2405 points. As of 2024, it is still the best Czech and Czechoslovak Olympic result in this sport.

Rousková-Padevětová is a member of the Czech Archery Hall of Fame.
