= František Gregor =

- Born: December 8, 1938; Bratislava, Czechoslovakia
- Died: March 10, 2013 (aged 74)
- Height: 5 ft 11 in (180 cm)
- Weight: 176 lb (80 kg; 12 st 8 lb)
- Position: Defence
- Played for: HC Slovan Bratislava; HC Dukla Jihlava; HC Košice
- National team: Czechoslovakia
- Playing career: 1955–1972

František Gregor
Medal record

Representing (Czechoslovakia)

Men's Ice Hockey
| Bronze medal – third place | 1964 Innsbruck | Team |

František Gregor (December 8, 1938 in Bratislava – March 10, 2013) was an ice hockey defenceman.

During his career, Gregor played for HC Slovan Bratislava, HC Dukla Jihlava and HC Košice. He also played for the Czechoslovak national team and won a bronze medal at the 1964 Winter Olympics.
