= Jarmila Králíčková =

Czech hockey player

Medal record

Women's field hockey

Representing Czechoslovakia

Olympic Games
| Silver medal – second place | 1980 Moscow | Team competition |

Jarmila Králíčková (born 11 May 1944 in Prague) is a Czech former field hockey player who competed for Czechoslovakia in the 1980 Summer Olympics.
