= Rostislav Václavíček =

Czech footballer (1946–2022)

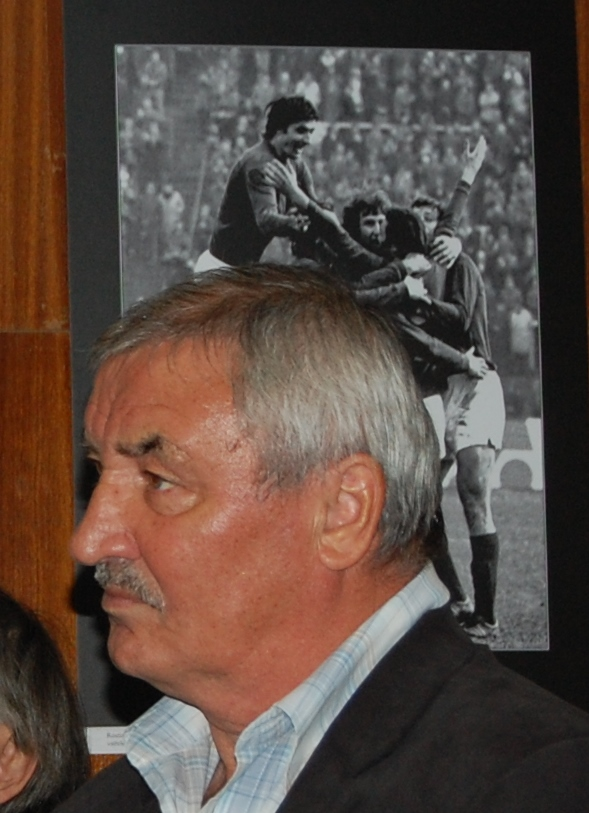
- Václavíček in 2015

Personal information
- Date of birth: 7 December 1946
- Place of birth: Vrahovice, Czechoslovakia
- Date of death: 7 August 2022 (aged 75)
- Place of death: Brno, Czech Republic
- Position: Defender

Youth career
- Železárny Prostějov

Senior career*
Years	Team	Apps	(Gls)
19??–1970	Železárny Prostějov		
1970–1971	NH Ostrava		
1971–1981	Zbrojovka Brno	289	(13)
1981–1984	KSC Hasselt		
1984–1986	Zbrojovka Brno		
Medal record
Men's football
Representing Czechoslovakia
Olympic Games
Gold medal – first place	1980 Moscow	Team competition
- * Club domestic league appearances and goals

Rostislav Václavíček (7 December 1946 – 7 August 2022) was a Czech footballer who played as a defender. He was a participant in the 1980 Olympic Games, where Czechoslovakia won the gold medal.

In his country, Václavíček played for FC Zbrojovka Brno, scoring 13 league goals in 289 games. He still holds the Czechoslovak and Czech league record playing 280 league matches in row.
