= Luděk Macela =

Czech footballer (1950–2016)

Personal information
- Date of birth: 3 October 1950
- Place of birth: Černolice, Czechoslovakia
- Date of death: 16 June 2016 (aged 65)
- Place of death: Prague, Czech Republic
- Height: 1.84 m (6 ft 1/2 in)
- Position: Defender

Youth career
- 1958–1962: SK Černolice
- 1962–1965: Tatran Všenory
- 1965–1969: Dukla Prague

Senior career*
Years	Team	Apps	(Gls)
1969–1970	→ Slavoj Vyšehrad (loan)		
1970–1982	Dukla Prague	267	(12)
1982–1985	SV Darmstadt 98	100	(0)

International career
1980–1981	Czechoslovakia	8	(0)
Medal record
Representing Czechoslovakia
Men's Football
Gold medal – first place	1980 Moscow	Team competition
- * Club domestic league appearances and goals

Luděk Macela (3 October 1950 – 16 June 2016) was a Czech football player. He played eight matches for the Czechoslovakia national football team.

He was a participant in the 1980 Olympic Games, where Czechoslovakia won the gold medal.

Macela played mostly for Dukla Prague and won the Czechoslovak First League three times with them, in 1977, 1979 and 1982.
