= Vlastibor Konečný =

Personal information
- Born: 2 January 1957 (age 69) Frýdek-Místek, Czechoslovakia
- Height: 1.81 m (5 ft 11 in)
- Weight: 75 kg (165 lb)

Cycling career
- Sport: Cycling
Medal record
Representing Czechoslovakia
Olympic Games
Bronze medal – third place	1980 Moscow	Team time trial
Friendship Games
Bronze medal – third place	1984 Schleiz	Road race, team

Vlastibor Konečný (born 2 January 1957) is a retired cyclist from Czechoslovakia. At the 1980 Summer Olympics he won a bronze medal in the 100 km time trial and finished in 17th place in the individual road race. He missed the 1984 Summer Olympics due to their boycott by Czechoslovakia and competed in the Friendship Games instead, winning a bronze medal in the team road race. He won the race of Lidice in 1975 and the Sealink Race in 1978.
