= Marianna Némethová-Krajčírová =

Slovak gymnast (born 1948)

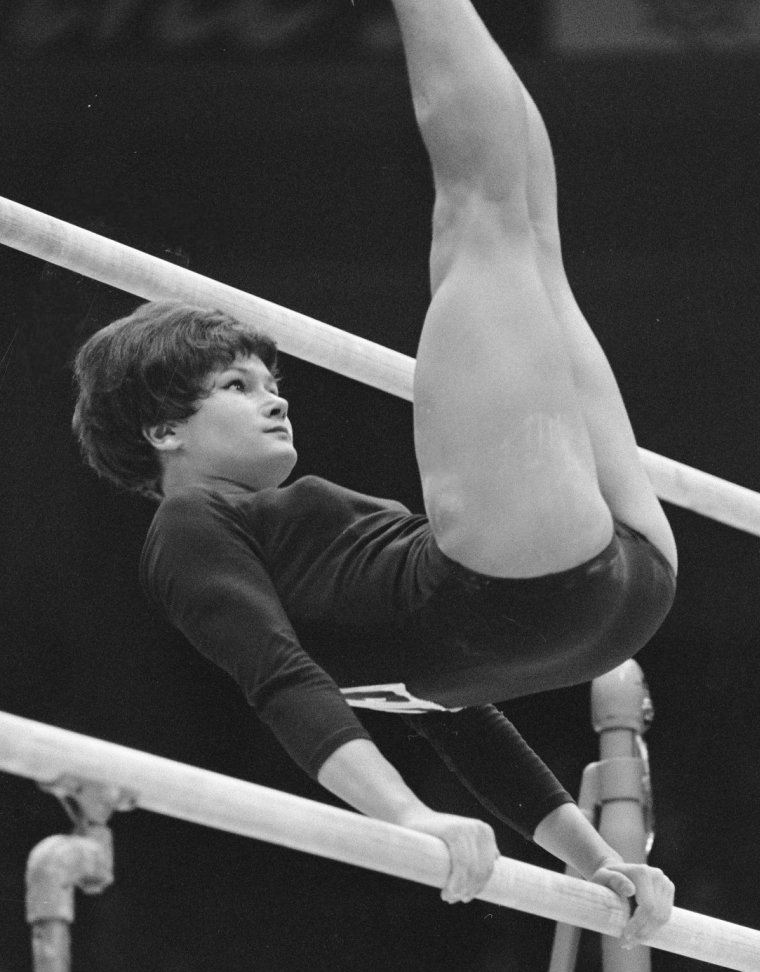

Personal information
- Born: 1 June 1948 (age 78) Košice, Czechoslovakia
- Height: 1.54 m (5 ft 1 in)
- Weight: 19 kg (42 lb)

Sport
- Sport: Artistic gymnastics
- Club: TJ Vinohrady, Bratislava
Medal record
Women's gymnastics
Representing Czechoslovakia
Olympic Games
Silver medal – second place	1964 Tokyo	Team
Silver medal – second place	1968 Mexico City	Team
World Championships
Gold medal – first place	1966 Dortmund	Team
Bronze medal – third place	1970 Ljubljana	Team
European Championships
Bronze medal – third place	1967 Amsterdam	Team
Bronze medal – third place	1967 Amsterdam	Uneven bars

Marianna Némethová-Krajčírová (born 1 June 1948) is a Slovak former gymnast. She competed in the 1964, 1968 and 1972 Summer Olympics and won silver medal in the team events in 1964 and 1968. Individually, her best achievement was fourth place on the vault in 1968.

She was born in Košice, but her family soon moved to Bratislava. She took gymnastics because of her father, a former gymnastics coach. After retirement from competitions she became a coach herself, and later an honorary member of Slovak Gymnastics Federation. She lives in Italy.
