= Lubomír Pokluda =

Czech footballer

Personal information
- Date of birth: 17 March 1958 (age 68)
- Place of birth: Vojkovice, Czechoslovakia
- Position: Midfielder

Senior career*
Years	Team	Apps	(Gls)
1976–1979	Sklo Union Teplice		
1979–1984	RH Cheb		
1985	Sparta Prague	18	(3)
1986–1988	Inter Bratislava	64	(14)
1988–1989	Lierse S.K.		

International career
1980–1982	Czechoslovakia	4	(0)
- * Club domestic league appearances and goals

Olympic medal record

Representing Czechoslovakia

Men's Football
Gold medal – first place	1980 Moscow	Team competition

Lubomír Pokluda (born 17 March 1958 in Vojkovice) is a Czech former footballer.
