= Petr Němec =

Czech footballer and manager

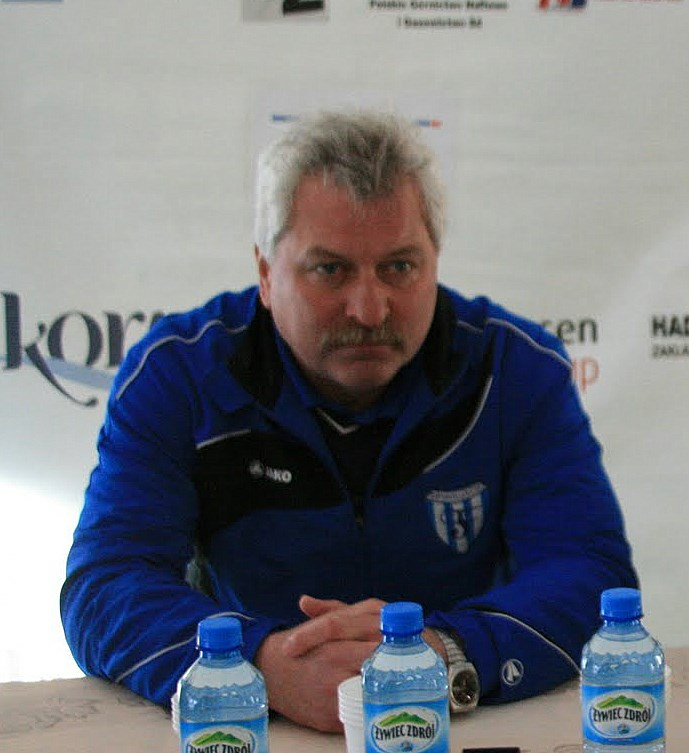

Personal information
- Date of birth: 7 June 1957 (age 69)
- Place of birth: Ostrava, Czechoslovakia
- Position: Midfielder

Youth career
- Baník Heřmanice
- 1972–1975: FC Baník Ostrava

Senior career*
Years	Team	Apps	(Gls)
1975–1977	Dukla Tábor		
1977–1986	Banik Ostrava	188	(33)
1986–1987	Sklo Union Teplice	14	(0)

International career
1981	Czechoslovakia	5	(0)

Managerial career
- 2001–2002: Śląsk Wrocław
- 2002–2003: Widzew Łódź
- 2004: KSZO Ostrowiec Świętokrzyski
- 2006–2007: Miedź Legnica
- 2007–2011: Flota Świnoujście
- 2011–2012: Arka Gdynia
- 2013–2014: Odra Opole
- 2014–2016: Ústí nad Labem
- 2016–2019: Warta Poznań
- 2019–2021: Kotwica Kołobrzeg
Medal record
Representing Czechoslovakia
Men's football
Olympic Games
Gold medal – first place	1980 Moscow	Team
- * Club domestic league appearances and goals

Petr Němec (born 7 June 1957) is a Czech professional football manager and former player.

== Club career ==
A midfielder, Němec played mostly for Baník Ostrava from his native city of Ostrava. He contributed to the best period in the history of the club. During his years as a player of the club, Baník won the Czechoslovak First League in 1980 and 1981, and the Czechoslovak Cup in 1978.

== International career ==
Němec was a member of the national teams that won the gold medal at the 1980 Summer Olympics in Moscow and the bronze medal at the 1980 UEFA European Championship.

He obtained a total number of five caps for his native country, between 24 March 1981 and 23 September 1981.

== Coaching career ==
Němec later began a coaching career, and worked in Poland from 2001 until 2021, with a two-year break from 2014 to 2016 when he managed Ústí nad Labem in his native Czech Republic.

== Honours ==
=== Player ===
Baník Ostrava

- Czechoslovak First League: 1979–80, 1980–81
- Czechoslovak Cup: 1977–78

Czechoslovakia

- Olympic Games gold medal: 1980

=== Managerial ===
Miedź Legnica

- III liga, group III: 2005–06
- Polish Cup (Legnica regionals): 2005–06

Flota Świnoujście

- III liga, group II: 2007–08
