= Vincent Lafko =

Czechoslovak handball player (1945-2012)

Olympic medal record

Men's Handball
Silver medal – second place	1972 Munich	Team competition

Vincent Lafko (7 June 1945 in Hranovnica – 15 December 2012 in Prešov) is a Czechoslovak/Slovak handball player who competed in the 1972 Summer Olympics.

He was part of the Czechoslovak team which won the silver medal at the Munich Games. He played five matches including the final and scored three goals.
