= Libor Radimec =

Czech footballer (born 1950)

Personal information
- Date of birth: 22 May 1950 (age 76)
- Place of birth: Ostrava, Czechoslovakia
- Height: 1.80 m (5 ft 11 in)
- Position: Defender

Youth career
- 1960–1969: TJ VŽKG Vítkovice

Senior career*
Years	Team	Apps	(Gls)
1969–1971	Dukla Jindřichův Hradec		
1971–1973	TJ VŽKG Vítkovice		
1973–1982	Baník Ostrava	212	(20)
1983	Austria Wien	8	(0)
1983–1985	First Vienna FC	30	(1)

International career
1980–1982	Czechoslovakia	17	(1)
- * Club domestic league appearances and goals

Olympic medal record

Representing Czechoslovakia

Men's Football
Gold medal – first place	1980 Moscow	Team competition

Libor Radimec (born 23 May 1950) is a Czech former football defender.

He played for Czechoslovakia, and was a participant in the 1982 FIFA World Cup. He also competed for Czechoslovakia at the 1980 Summer Olympics, where the team won the gold medals.

In his country he played for Baník Ostrava, for which he played 212 league matches and scored 20 league goals. He contributed to the best period in the history of the club. During his years as a player of the club, Baník won the Czechoslovak First League in 1976, 1980 and 1981. Baník also won the Czechoslovak Cup in 1978.
