= Peter Pospíšil =

Czechoslovak handball player (1944-2006)

Olympic medal record

Men's Handball
Silver medal – second place	1972 Munich	Team competition

Peter Pospíšil (24 April 1944 in Bratislava – 17 April 2006 in Bratislava) was a Slovak handball player who competed in the 1972 Summer Olympics, representing Czechoslovakia.

He was part of the Czechoslovak team which won the silver medal at the Munich Games. He played five matches including the final as goalkeeper.
