= Josef Pick =

Czech volleyball player (born 1958)

Personal information
- Nationality: Czech
- Born: 11 November 1958 (age 66)

Sport
- Sport: Volleyball

Josef Pick (born 11 November 1958) is a Czech volleyball player. He competed in the men's tournament at the 1980 Summer Olympics.
