= Jindřich Svoboda (footballer) =

Czech footballer

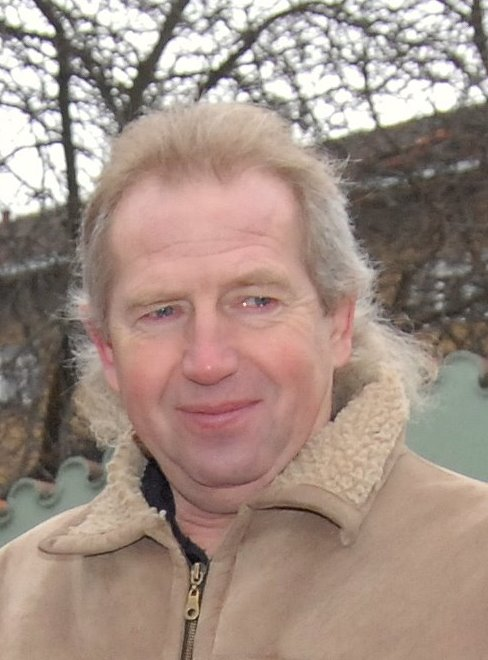
- Svoboda in 2009

Personal information
- Date of birth: 14 September 1952 (age 74)
- Place of birth: Adamov, Czechoslovakia
- Position: Striker

Youth career
- Spartak ADAST Adamov

Senior career*
Years	Team	Apps	(Gls)
1971–1973	Dukla Brno		
1973–1983	Zbrojovka Brno	216	(16)
1984–1986	TJ Gottwaldov	48	(19)

International career
1975–1977	Czechoslovakia	2	(0)
- * Club domestic league appearances and goals

Olympic medal record

Representing Czechoslovakia

Men's Football
Gold medal – first place	1980 Moscow	Team competition

Jindřich Svoboda (born 14 September 1952 in Adamov) is a Czech football player. He played for Czechoslovakia.

He was a participant at the 1980 Olympic Games, where Czechoslovakia won the gold medal, thanks to his winning goal in the final match.

In his country he played mostly for Zbrojovka Brno.
