= Oldřich Rott =

Czechoslovak footballer (born 1951)

Personal information
- Date of birth: 26 May 1951 (age 75)
- Place of birth: Třebechovice pod Orebem, Czechoslovakia
- Position: Midfielder

Youth career
- TJ Třebechovice pod Orebem
- 1966–1970: Spartak Hradec Králové

Senior career*
| Years | Team | Apps | (Gls) |
| 1970–1973 | Spartak Hradec Králové | | |
| 1973–1983 | Dukla Prague | 313 | (46) |
| 1983–1984 | EPA Larnaca | | |
| 1984–1985 | Slavia Prague | 18 | (1) |

International career
| 1978–1979 | Czechoslovakia | 3 | (0) |
- * Club domestic league appearances and goals

Olympic medal record

Representing Czechoslovakia

Men's Football
| Gold medal – first place | 1980 Moscow | Team competition |

Oldřich Rott (born 26 May 1951) is a former football midfielder from Czechoslovakia. He was a member of the national team that won the gold medal at the 1980 Summer Olympics in Moscow. Rott obtained a total number of three caps for his native country, between 1978-05-17 and 1979-03-14.

Rott played mostly for Dukla Prague and won three times the Czechoslovak First League with them, in 1977, 1979 and 1982.
