= Igor Liba =

Slovak ice hockey player

- Born: November 4, 1960 (age 65) Prešov, Czechoslovakia
- Height: 6 ft 0 in (183 cm)
- Weight: 192 lb (87 kg; 13 st 10 lb)
- Position: Left wing
- Shot: Right
- Played for: ZPA Prešov; HC Košice; HC Dukla Jihlava; New York Rangers; Los Angeles Kings; EHC Biel; HC Cavalese; EV Zeltweg; HK Spišská Nová Ves
- National team: Czechoslovakia
- NHL draft: 91st overall, 1983; Calgary Flames
- Playing career: 1979–2003

Igor Liba (born November 4, 1960) is a Slovak former professional ice hockey player. He played 37 games in the National Hockey League with the New York Rangers and Los Angeles Kings during the 1988–89 season. The rest of his career, which lasted from 1979 to 2003, was mainly spent in the Czechoslovak Extraliga and in other European leagues. Internationally Liba played for the Czechslovak national team in several tournaments, including the 1984, 1988, and 1992 Winter Olympics, winning a bronze medal in the latter. In 2005 Liba was inducted into the Slovak Hockey Hall of Fame. He was inducted into the player category of the IIHF Hall of Fame in 2024.

== Career ==
Igor Liba played for ZPA Prešov (1970–1978), HC Košice (1978–82, 1984–88, 1991–92, 1997–98 and 1998–99) and HC Dukla Jihlava (1982–84) in Czechoslovakia, after 1993 in Slovakia mostly for HK VTJ Spišská Nová Ves.

In 1983 he was drafted by the Calgary Flames. Played with the New York Rangers (10 games, 2 goals and 5 assists) and Los Angeles Kings (37 games, 7 goals and 18 assists) in the 1988–89.

He also played for EHC Biel - Switzerland, it:Hockey Club Fiemme - Italy, TuTo Turku - Finland, HK VTJ Spišská Nová Ves - Slovakia, HK VTJ Trebišov - Slovakia, HC Zeltweg - Austria and HK Dragon Prešov - Slovakia.

Internationally, he played for the Czechoslovakia men's national ice hockey team, and was inducted into the player category of the IIHF Hall of Fame during the medal ceremony of the 2024 IIHF World Championship.

== Career statistics ==
=== Regular season and playoffs ===
			Regular season					Playoffs
Season	Team	League	GP	G	A	Pts	PIM	GP	G	A	Pts	PIM
1977–78	ZPA Prešov	CSSR-3	—	—	—	—	—	—	—	—	—	—
1978–79	ZPA Prešov	CSSR-3	—	—	—	—	—	—	—	—	—	—
1979–80	TJ VSŽ Košice	CSSR	42	16	10	26	16	—	—	—	—	—
1980–81	TJ VSŽ Košice	CSSR	43	17	24	41	20	—	—	—	—	—
1981–82	TJ VSŽ Košice	CSSR	44	35	18	53	34	—	—	—	—	—
1982–83	ASD Dukla Jihlava	CSSR	43	27	18	45	24	—	—	—	—	—
1983–84	ASD Dukla Jihlava	CSSR	41	14	18	32	16	—	—	—	—	—
1984–85	TJ VSŽ Košice	CSSR	44	28	26	54	22	—	—	—	—	—
1985–86	TJ VSŽ Košice	CSSR	34	25	29	54	32	—	—	—	—	—
1986–87	TJ VSŽ Košice	CSSR	31	13	16	29	38	—	—	—	—	—
1987–88	TJ VSŽ Košice	CSSR	42	21	37	58	86	—	—	—	—	—
1988–89	New York Rangers	NHL	10	2	5	7	15	—	—	—	—	—
1988–89	Los Angeles Kings	NHL	27	5	13	18	21	2	0	0	0	2
1989–90	TJ VSŽ Košice	CSSR	44	17	20	37	37	—	—	—	—	—
1990–91	HC VSZ Košice	CSSR	2	0	1	1	0	3	1	2	3	0
1990–91	EHC Biel	NDA	18	13	8	21	10	3	1	0	1	4
1991–92	HC VSZ Košice	CSSR	16	7	9	16	6	—	—	—	—	—
1991–92	HC Cavalese	ITA	18	11	34	45	2	4	2	7	9	4
1992–93	TUTO Hockey	FIN-2	44	22	34	56	111	—	—	—	—	—
1993–94	EV Zeltweg	AUT-2	—	—	—	—	—	—	—	—	—	—
1994–95	EV Zeltweg	AUT	30	30	23	53	44	—	—	—	—	—
1995–96	EV Zeltweg	AUT	33	15	19	34	34	—	—	—	—	—
1996–97	HK VTJ Spišská Nová Ves	SVK	46	26	25	51	72	—	—	—	—	—
1997–98	HC Košice	SVK	32	10	24	34	36	—	—	—	—	—
1997–98	HK Trebisov	SVK-2	4	1	4	5	2	—	—	—	—	—
1998–99	HC VSZ Košice	SVK	52	15	25	40	24	—	—	—	—	—
1999–00	EV Zeltweg	AUT-2	30	24	36	60	18	—	—	—	—	—
2000–01	HK VTJ Farmakol Prešov	SVK-2	36	17	25	42	6	—	—	—	—	—
2002–03	HK Spisska Nova Ves	SVK	20	1	10	11	40	—	—	—	—	—
2002–03	HK VTJ Farmakol Prešov	SVK-2	20	8	11	19	40	—	—	—	—	—
CSSR totals			426	220	226	446	331	8	5	6	11	0
NHL totals			37	7	18	25	36	2	0	0	0	2

=== International ===
Medal record

Representing Czechoslovakia

Olympics
Silver medal – second place	1984 Sarajevo	
Bronze medal – third place	1992 Albertville	

World Championships
Gold medal – first place	1985 Czechoslovakia	
Silver medal – second place	1982 Finland	
Silver medal – second place	1983 West Germany	
Bronze medal – third place	1987 Austria	
Bronze medal – third place	1992 Czechoslovakia	

World Junior Championships
Silver medal – second place	1979 Sweden	

Year	Team	Event	GP	G	A	Pts	PIM
1979	Czechoslovakia	WJC	5	0	0	0	2
1980	Czechoslovakia	WJC	5	4	1	5	4
1982	Czechoslovakia	WC	10	3	2	5	6
1983	Czechoslovakia	WC	10	2	8	10	0
1984	Czechoslovakia	OLY	7	4	3	7	6
1984	Czechoslovakia	CC	5	2	3	5	6
1985	Czechoslovakia	WC	10	2	5	7	16
1986	Czechoslovakia	WC	10	2	4	6	18
1987	Czechoslovakia	WC	10	2	3	5	12
1987	Czechoslovakia	CC	6	0	4	4	6
1988	Czechoslovakia	OLY	8	4	6	10	8
1992	Czechoslovakia	OLY	4	1	2	3	4
1992	Czechoslovakia	WC	8	2	1	3	10
Junior totals			10	4	1	5	6
Senior totals			88	24	41	65	92

Awards
Preceded by Vincent Lukac	Golden Hockey Stick; 1984	Succeeded by Jiri Kralik
