= Berta Hrubá =

Czech field hockey player

Olympic medal record

Women's field hockey

Representing Czechoslovakia
Silver medal – second place	1980 Moscow	Team competition

Berta Hrubá (8 April 1946 in Prague – 24 July 1998) was a Czech field hockey player who competed in the 1980 Summer Olympics.
