= Marie Sýkorová =

Czech field hockey player (1952–2018)

Olympic medal record

Women's field hockey

Representing Czechoslovakia
| Silver medal – second place | 1980 Moscow | Team competition |

Marie Sýkorová (18 November 1952 – March 2018) was a Czech field hockey player who competed in the 1980 Summer Olympics. She was born in České Budějovice.
