= František Kunzo =

Slovak footballer

Olympic medal record

Men's football

Representing Czechoslovakia
| Gold medal – first place | 1980 Moskva | Team competition |

František Kunzo (born 17 September 1954 in Spišský Hrušov) is a Slovak former football player who competed in the 1980 Summer Olympics.
