= Jiřina Křížová =

Czech hockey player

Olympic medal record

Women's field hockey

Representing Czechoslovakia
Silver medal – second place	1980 Moscow	Team competition

Jiřina Křížová (born 21 February 1948 in Jirkov) is a Czech former field hockey player who competed in the 1980 Summer Olympics.
