= Alena Kyselicová =

Slovak field hockey player

Personal information
- Full name: Alena Mejzlíková-Kyselicová
- Born: 14 November 1957 (age 68) Trenčianske Teplice, Czechoslovakia

Sport
- Country: Czechoslovakia
- Sport: Field hockey
Medal record
Women's field hockey
Representing Czechoslovakia
Olympic Games
Silver medal – second place	1980 Moscow	Team competition

Alena Mejzlíková-Kyselicová (born 14 November 1957 in Trenčianske Teplice) is a Slovak former field hockey player. She competed for Czechoslovakia in the 1980 Summer Olympics.
