= Jiřina Kadlecová =

Czech hockey player

Olympic medal record

Women's field hockey

Representing Czechoslovakia
Silver medal – second place	1980 Moscow	Team competition

Jiřina Kadlecová (born 1 June 1948 in Prague) is a Czech former field hockey player who competed in the 1980 Summer Olympics. She is 5 ft 3 in (160 cm) in height and weighs 123 lbs.
