= Jana Lahodová =

Czech field hockey player

Olympic medal record

Women's field hockey

Representing Czechoslovakia
Silver medal – second place	1980 Moscow	Team competition

Jana Lahodová, married Vudmasková (4 June 1957 in Hradec Králové – 15 October 2010) was a Czech field hockey player who competed in the 1980 Summer Olympics.
