= Jiřina Hájková =

Czech hockey player

Olympic medal record

Women's field hockey

Representing Czechoslovakia
Silver medal – second place	1980 Moscow	Team competition

Jiřina Hájková (born 31 January 1954 in Děčín) is a Czech former field hockey player who competed in the 1980 Summer Olympics.
