= Lenka Vymazalová =

Czech hockey player

Olympic medal record

Women's field hockey

Representing Czechoslovakia
Silver medal – second place	1980 Moscow	Team competition

Lenka Vymazalová (born 15 June 1959 in Litoměřice) is a Czech former field hockey player who competed in the 1980 Summer Olympics.

Vymazalová won Olympic silver medal in hockey during the 1980 Summer Olympics in Moscow . She was part of the Czechoslovak women's team who came second in the hockey tournament behind Zimbabwe . It was the first time hockey for ladies was on the Olympic program. Six teams participated and a single series was played where all teams met once. Czechoslovakia won three games, one draw and one loss, and with seven points the second on the table became one point behind Zimbabwe. Vymazalová played two games in the Olympic tournament.
