= Jiřina Čermáková =

Czech field hockey player (1944–2019)

Olympic medal record

Women's field hockey

Representing Czechoslovakia
Silver medal – second place	1980 Moscow	Team competition

Jiřina Čermáková (17 November 1944 – 17 November 2019) was a Czech field hockey player who competed in the 1980 Summer Olympics. She was born in Prague. After her playing career, she became a field hockey coach.
