= Marta Urbanová =

Czech hockey player

Olympic medal record

Women's field hockey

Representing Czechoslovakia
Silver medal – second place	1980 Moscow	Team competition

Marta Urbanová, married Daňhelová (born 14 October 1960 in České Budějovice) is a Czech former field hockey player who competed in the 1980 Summer Olympics.
