= Zdeněk Rygel =

Czechoslovak footballer (born 1951)

Personal information
- Date of birth: 1 March 1951 (age 75)
- Place of birth: Ostrava, Czechoslovakia
- Position: Defender

Youth career
- Baník Michálkovice
- 1966–1972: Baník Ostrava

Senior career*
Years	Team	Apps	(Gls)
1972–1983	Baník Ostrava	257	(7)
1983–1984	EPA Larnaca		
1984–1986	Zbrojovka Brno		

International career
1974–1975	Czechoslovakia	4	(0)
- * Club domestic league appearances and goals

Olympic medal record

Representing Czechoslovakia

Men's Football
Gold medal – first place	1980 Moscow	Team competition

Zdeněk Rygel (born 1 March 1951 in Ostrava) is a former football player from Czechoslovakia. He was a member of the national team that won the gold medal at the 1980 Summer Olympics in Moscow. Rygel obtained a total number of four caps for his native country, between 27 April 1974 and 7 June 1975.

He played for Baník Ostrava and contributed to the best period in the history of the club. During his years as a player of the club, Baník won the Czechoslovak First League in 1976, 1980 and 1981. Baník also won the Czechoslovak Cup in 1978.

He is the father of footballer Daniel Rygel.
