= Květa Petříčková =

Czech hockey player

Olympic medal record

Women's field hockey

Representing Czechoslovakia
Silver medal – second place	1980 Moscow	Team competition

Květoslava "Květa" Petříčková (born 17 July 1952 in Prague) is a Czech former field hockey player who competed in the 1980 Summer Olympics.
