= Milada Blažková =

Czech hockey player (born 1958)

Olympic medal record

Women's field hockey

Representing Czechoslovakia
Silver medal – second place	1980 Moscow	Team competition

Milada Blažková (born 30 May 1958 in Prague) is a Czech former field hockey player who competed in the 1980 Summer Olympics.
