= Ida Hubáčková =

Czech field hockey player

Olympic medal record

Women's field hockey

Representing Czechoslovakia
Silver medal – second place	1980 Moscow	Team competition

Ida Hubáčková (born 1 October 1954 in Prague) is a Czech former field hockey player who competed in the 1980 Summer Olympics.
