= Iveta Šranková =

Slovak field hockey player

Olympic medal record

Women's field hockey

Representing Czechoslovakia
Silver medal – second place	1980 Moscow	Team competition

Iveta Šranková (born 1 October 1963 in Zlaté Moravce) is a Slovak former field hockey player who competed in the 1980 Summer Olympics.
