= Viera Podhányiová =

Slovak hockey player

Olympic medal record

Women's field hockey

Representing Czechoslovakia
Silver medal – second place	1980 Moscow	Team competition

Viera Podhányiová, married Jakabová (born 19 September 1960 in Zlaté Moravce) is a Slovak former field hockey player who competed in the 1980 Summer Olympics.
