= East Germany at the 1980 Summer Olympics =

- IOC code: GDR
- NOC: National Olympic Committee of the German Democratic Republic

in Moscow, Soviet Union 19 July–3 August 1980
- Competitors: 346 (222 men, 124 women) in 17 sports
- Flag bearers: Kristina Richter (opening), Waldemar Cierpinski (closing)
- Medals Ranked 2nd: Gold 47 Silver 37 Bronze 42 Total 126

Summer Olympics appearances (overview)
- 1968; 1972; 1976; 1980; 1984; 1988

Other related appearances
- Germany (1896–1936, 1992–pres.); United Team of Germany (1956–1964)

Athletes from East Germany (German Democratic Republic) competed at the 1980 Summer Olympics in Moscow, USSR. 346 competitors, 222 men and 124 women, took part in 167 events in 17 sports.

== Medalists ==
Medal	Name	Sport	Event
Gold	Waldemar Cierpinski	Athletics	Men's marathon
Gold	Thomas Munkelt	Athletics	Men's 110 m Hurdles
Gold	Volker Beck	Athletics	Men's 400 m Hurdles
Gold	Hartwig Gauder	Athletics	Men's 50km Walk
Gold	Gerd Wessig	Athletics	Men's High Jump
Gold	Lutz Dombrowski	Athletics	Men's Long Jump
Gold	Bärbel Wöckel	Athletics	Women's 200 m
Gold	Marita Koch	Athletics	Women's 400 m
Gold	Romy Müller; Bärbel Wöckel; Ingrid Auerswald; Marlies Göhr	Athletics	Women's 4 × 100 m Relay
Gold	Ilona Slupianek	Athletics	Women's Shot Put
Gold	Evelin Jahl	Athletics	Women's Discus
Gold	Rudi Fink	Boxing	Men's Featherweight
Gold	Rüdiger Helm	Canoeing	Men's K-1 1000 m
Gold	Rüdiger Helm; Bernd Olbricht; Harald Marg; Bernd Duvigneau	Canoeing	Men's K-4 1000 m
Gold	Birgit Fischer	Canoeing	Women's K-1 500 m
Gold	Carsta Genäuß; Martina Bischof	Canoeing	Women's K-2 500 m
Gold	Lothar Thoms	Cycling	Men's 1000 m Individual Time Trial
Gold	Lutz Heßlich	Cycling	Men's Sprint
Gold	Falk Hoffmann	Diving	Men's 10 m Platform
Gold	Martina Jäschke	Diving	Women's 10 m Platform
Gold	Roland Brückner	Gymnastics	Men's Floor
Gold	Maxi Gnauck	Gymnastics	Women's Uneven Bars
Gold	East Germany Men's National Handball Team: Hans-Georg Beyer; Lothar Doering; Günter Dreibrodt; Ernst Gerlach; Klaus Gruner; Rainer Höft; Hans-Georg Jaunich; Hartmut Krüger; Peter Rost; Dietmar Schmidt; Wieland Schmidt; Siegfried Voigt; Frank-Michael Wahl; Ingolf Wiegert	Handball	Men's Tournament
Gold	Dietmar Lorenz	Judo	Men's Open
Gold	Joachim Dreifke; Klaus Kröppelien	Rowing	Men's Double Sculls
Gold	Frank Dundr; Carsten Bunk; Uwe Heppner; Martin Winter	Rowing	Men's Quadruple Sculls
Gold	Jörg Landvoigt; Bernd Landvoigt	Rowing	Men's Coxless Pairs
Gold	Harald Jährling; Friedrich-Wilhelm Ulrich; Georg Spohr	Rowing	Men's Coxed Pairs
Gold	Siegfried Brietzke; Andreas Decker; Stefan Semmler; Jürgen Thiele	Rowing	Men's Coxless Fours
Gold	Dieter Wendisch; Walter Dießner; Ullrich Dießner; Gottfried Döhn; Andreas Gregor	Rowing	Men's Coxed Fours
Gold	Bernd Krauß; Hans-Peter Koppe; Ulrich Kons; Jörg Friedrich; Jens Doberschütz; Ulrich Karnatz; Uwe Dühring; Bernd Höing; Klaus-Dieter Ludwig	Rowing	Men's Eights
Gold	Sybille Reinhardt; Jutta Ploch; Jutta Lau; Roswietha Zobelt; Liane Buhr	Rowing	Women's Quadruple Sculls
Gold	Ute Steindorf; Cornelia Klier	Rowing	Women's Coxless Pairs
Gold	Ramona Kapheim; Silvia Fröhlich; Angelika Noack; Romy Saalfeld; Kirsten Wenzel	Rowing	Women's Coxed Fours
Gold	Martina Boesler; Kersten Neisser; Christiane Köpke; Birgit Schütz; Gabriele Kühn; Ilona Richter; Marita Sandig; Karin Metze; Marina Wilke	Rowing	Women's Eights
Gold	Jörg Woithe	Swimming	Men's 100 m Freestyle
Gold	Barbara Krause	Swimming	Women's 100 m Freestyle
Gold	Barbara Krause	Swimming	Women's 200 m Freestyle
Gold	Ines Diers	Swimming	Women's 400 m Freestyle
Gold	Petra Schneider	Swimming	Women's 400 m Individual Medley
Gold	Rica Reinisch	Swimming	Women's 100 m Backstroke
Gold	Rica Reinisch	Swimming	Women's 200 m Backstroke
Gold	Ute Geweniger	Swimming	Women's 100 m Breaststroke
Gold	Caren Metschuck	Swimming	Women's 100 m Butterfly
Gold	Ines Geißler	Swimming	Women's 200 m Butterfly
Gold	Barbara Krause; Caren Metschuck; Ines Diers; Sarina Hülsenbeck	Swimming	Women's 4 × 100 m Freestyle Relay
Gold	Rica Reinisch; Ute Geweniger; Andrea Pollack; Caren Metschuck	Swimming	Women's 4 × 100 m Medley Relay
Silver	Jürgen Straub	Athletics	Men's 1500 m
Silver	Klaus Thiele; Andreas Knebel; Frank Schaffer; Volker Beck	Athletics	Men's 4 × 400 m Relay
Silver	Frank Paschek	Athletics	Men's Long Jump
Silver	Marlies Göhr	Athletics	Women's 100 m
Silver	Christiane Wartenberg	Athletics	Women's 1500 m
Silver	Johanna Schaller-Klier	Athletics	Women's 100 m Hurdles
Silver	Barbara Krug; Gabriele Löwe; Christina Lathan; Marita Koch	Athletics	Women's 4 × 400 m Relay
Silver	Brigitte Wujak	Athletics	Women's Long Jump
Silver	Olaf Heukrodt; Uwe Madeja	Canoeing	Men's C-2 1000 m
Silver	Gerald Mortag; Uwe Unterwalder; Matthias Wiegand; Volker Winkler	Cycling	Men's Team Pursuit
Silver	Falk Boden; Bernd Drogan; Olaf Ludwig; Hans-Joachim Hartnick	Cycling	Men's Team Time Trial
Silver	Martina Proeber	Diving	Women's 3 m Springboard
Silver	East Germany national football team: Bodo Rudwaleit; Artur Ullrich; Lothar Hause; Frank Uhlig; Frank Baum; Rüdiger Schnuphase; Frank Terletzki; Wolfgang Steinbach; Jürgen Bähringer; Werner Peter; Dieter Kühn; Norbert Trieloff; Matthias Müller; Matthias Liebers; Bernd Jakubowski; Wolf-Rüdiger Netz	Football	Men's Tournament
Silver	Ralf-Peter Hemmann; Lutz Hoffmann; Lutz Mack; Michael Nikolay; Andreas Bronst; Roland Brückner	Gymnastics	Men's Team All-Around
Silver	Maxi Gnauck	Gymnastics	Women's Individual All-Around
Silver	Steffi Kräker	Gymnastics	Women's Vault
Silver	Cornelia Linse; Heidi Westphal	Rowing	Women's Double Sculls
Silver	Jörn Borowski; Egbert Swensson	Sailing	470
Silver	Harald Vollmar	Shooting	Men's 50 m Pistol
Silver	Hellfried Heilfort	Shooting	Men's 50 m Rifle Prone
Silver	Bernd Hartstein	Shooting	Men's 50 m Rifle Three Positions
Silver	Jürgen Wiefel	Shooting	Men's 25 m Rapid Fire Pistol
Silver	Thomas Pfeffer	Shooting	Men's 50 m Running Target
Silver	Roger Pyttel	Swimming	Men's 100 m Butterfly
Silver	Frank Pfütze; Jörg Woithe; Detlev Grabs; Rainer Strohbach	Swimming	Men's 4 × 200 m Freestyle Relay
Silver	Caren Metschuck	Swimming	Women's 100 m Freestyle
Silver	Ines Diers	Swimming	Women's 200 m Freestyle
Silver	Ines Diers	Swimming	Women's 800 m Freestyle
Silver	Petra Schneider	Swimming	Women's 400 m Freestyle
Silver	Ina Kleber	Swimming	Women's 100 m Backstroke
Silver	Cornelia Polit	Swimming	Women's 200 m Backstroke
Silver	Andrea Pollack	Swimming	Women's 100 m Butterfly
Silver	Sybille Schönrock	Swimming	Women's 200 m Butterfly
Silver	East Germany women's national volleyball team: Katharina Bullin; Barbara Czekalla; Brigitte Fetzer; Andrea Heim; Ute Kostrzewa; Heike Lehmann; Christine Mummhardt; Karin Püschel; Karla Roffeis; Martina Schmidt; Annette Schultz; Anke Westendorf	Volleyball	Women's Tournament
Silver	Joachim Kunz	Weightlifting	Men's 67.5 kg
Silver	Jürgen Heuser	Weightlifting	Men's +110 kg
Bronze	Frank Schaffer	Athletics	Men's 400 m
Bronze	Roland Wieser	Athletics	Men's 20km Walk
Bronze	Jörg Freimuth	Athletics	Men's High Jump
Bronze	Udo Beyer	Athletics	Men's Shot Put
Bronze	Wolfgang Hanisch	Athletics	Men's Javelin
Bronze	Ingrid Auerswald	Athletics	Women's 100 m
Bronze	Christina Lathan	Athletics	Women's 400 m
Bronze	Jutta Kirst	Athletics	Women's High Jump
Bronze	Margitta Droese-Pufe	Athletics	Women's Shot Put
Bronze	Ute Hommola	Athletics	Women's Javelin
Bronze	Richard Nowakowski	Boxing	Men's Lightweight
Bronze	Karl-Heinz Krüger	Boxing	Men's Welterweight
Bronze	Detlef Kästner	Boxing	Men's Light Middleweight
Bronze	Herbert Bauch	Boxing	Men's Light Heavyweight
Bronze	Jürgen Fanghänel	Boxing	Men's Heavyweight
Bronze	Olaf Heukrodt	Canoeing	Men's C-1 500 m
Bronze	Eckhard Leue	Canoeing	Men's C-1 1000 m
Bronze	Rüdiger Helm; Bernd Olbricht	Canoeing	Men's K-2 500 m
Bronze	Karin Guthke	Diving	Women's 3 m Springboard
Bronze	Michael Nikolay	Gymnastics	Men's Pommel Horse
Bronze	Roland Brückner	Gymnastics	Men's Vault
Bronze	Roland Brückner	Gymnastics	Men's Parallel Bars
Bronze	Maxi Gnauck; Silvia Hindorff; Steffi Kräker; Katharina Rensch; Karola Sube; Birgit Süß	Gymnastics	Women's Team All-Around
Bronze	Steffi Kräker	Gymnastics	Women's Uneven Bars
Bronze	Maxi Gnauck	Gymnastics	Women's Floor
Bronze	East Germany Women's National Handball Team: Birgit Heinecke; Roswitha Krause; Waltraud Kretzschmar; Katrin Krüger; Kornelia Kunisch; Evelyn Matz; Kristina Richter; Christina Rost; Sabine Röther; Renate Rudolph; Marion Tietz; Petra Uhlig; Claudia Wunderlich; Hannelore Zober	Handball	Women's Tournament
Bronze	Karl-Heinz Lehmann	Judo	Men's 71 kg
Bronze	Harald Heinke	Judo	Men's 78 kg
Bronze	Detlef Ultsch	Judo	Men's 86 kg
Bronze	Dietmar Lorenz	Judo	Men's 95 kg
Bronze	Peter Kersten	Rowing	Men's Single Sculls
Bronze	Martina Schröter	Rowing	Women's Single Sculls
Bronze	Jörg Damme	Shooting	Men's Trap
Bronze	Roger Pyttel	Swimming	Men's 200 m Butterfly
Bronze	Ines Diers	Swimming	Women's 100 m Freestyle
Bronze	Carmela Schmidt	Swimming	Women's 200 m Freestyle
Bronze	Carmela Schmidt	Swimming	Women's 400 m Freestyle
Bronze	Heike Dähne	Swimming	Women's 800 m Freestyle
Bronze	Petra Riedel	Swimming	Women's 100 m Backstroke
Bronze	Birgit Treiber	Swimming	Women's 200 m Backstroke
Bronze	Christiane Knacke	Swimming	Women's 100 m Butterfly
Bronze	Frank Mantek	Weightlifting	Men's 90 kg
Bronze	Uwe Neupert	Wrestling	Men's Freestyle 90kg

== Athletics ==
Men's Competition

Men's 100 metres

- Eugen Ray
  - Heat — 10.38
  - Quarterfinals — 10.30
  - Semifinals — 10.47 (→ did not advance)
- Sören Schlegel
  - Heat — 10.44
  - Quarterfinals — 10.28 (→ did not advance)
- Klaus-Dieter Kurrat
  - Heat — 10.53
  - Quarterfinals — 10.54 (→ did not advance)

Men's 800 metres

- Andreas Busse
  - Heat — 1:47.4
  - Semifinals — 1:46.9
  - Final — 1:46.9 (→ 5th place)
- Detlef Wagenknecht
  - Heat — 1:47.5
  - Semifinals — 1:46.7
  - Final — 1:47.0 (→ 6th place)
- Olaf Beyer
  - Heat — 1:48.9
  - Semifinals — 1:47.6 (→ did not advance)

Men's 1,500 metres

- Jürgen Straub
  - Heat — 3:37.0
  - Semifinals — 3:39.4
  - Final — 3:38.8 (→ Silver Medal)
- Andreas Busse
  - Heat — 3:44.3
  - Semifinals — 3:43.5
  - Final — 3:40.2 (→ 4th place)

Men's 10,000 metres

- Jörg Peter
  - Heat — 28:50.0
  - Final — 28:05.5 (→ 6th place)
- Werner Schildhauer
  - Heat — 28:32.1
  - Final — 28:11.0 (→ 7th place)

Men's Marathon

- Waldemar Cierpinski
  - Final — 2:11:03 (→ Gold Medal)
- Hans-Joachim Truppel
  - Final — 2:14:55 (→ 11th place)
- Jürgen Eberding
  - Final — 2:18:04 (→ 21st place)

Men's 4 × 400 metres Relay

- Klaus Thiele, Andreas Knebel, Frank Schaffer, and Volker Beck
  - Heat — 3:03.4
  - Final — 3:01.3 (→ Silver Medal)

Men's 110 m Hurdles

- Thomas Munkelt
  - Heat — 13.55
  - Semifinals — 13.49
  - Final — 13.39 (→ Gold Medal)
- Thomas Dittrich
  - Heat — 13.93
  - Semifinals — 13.90 (→ did not advance)
- Andreas Schlißke
  - Heat — 14.18
  - Semifinals — 14.60 (→ did not advance)

Men's 400 m Hurdles

- Volker Beck
  - Heat — 50.35
  - Semifinals — 50.36
  - Final — 48.70 (→ Gold Medal)

Men's 3,000 m Steeplechase

- Ralf Pönitsch
  - Heat — 8:56.5 (→ did not advance)

Men's Pole Vault

- Axel Weber
  - Qualification — 5.15 m (→ did not advance)

Men's Long Jump

- Lutz Dombrowski
  - Qualification — 8.17 m
  - Final — 8.54 m (→ Gold Medal)
- Frank Paschek
  - Qualification — 8.17 m
  - Final — 8.21 m (→ Silver Medal)
- Peter Rieger
  - Qualification — 7.59 m (→ did not advance)

Men's High Jump

- Gerd Wessig
  - Qualification — 2.21 m
  - Final — 2.36 m (→ Gold Medal)
- Jörg Freimuth
  - Qualification — 2.21 m
  - Final — 2.31 m (→ Bronze Medal)
- Henry Lauterbach
  - Qualification — 2.21 m
  - Final — 2.29 m (→ 4th place)

Men's Discus Throw

- Wolfgang Schmidt
  - Qualification — 62.46 m
  - Final — 65.64 m (→ 4th place)
- Hilmar Hossfeld
  - Qualification — 59.92 m
  - Final — 61.14 m (→ 11th place)
- Armin Lemme
  - Qualification — 59.44 m (→ did not advance, 13th place)

Men's Shot Put

- Udo Beyer
  - Qualification — 19.94 m
  - Final — 21.06 m (→ Bronze Medal)
- Hans-Jürgen Jacobi
  - Qualification — 19.92 m
  - Final — 20.32 m (→ 6th place)

Men's Javelin Throw

- Wolfgang Hanisch
  - Qualification — 85.82 m
  - Final — 86.72 m (→ Bronze Medal)
- Detlef Fuhrmann
  - Qualification — 78.80 m
  - Final — 83.50 m (→ 7th place)
- Detlef Michel
  - Qualification — 78.34 m (→ did not advance, 13th place)

Men's Hammer Throw

- Roland Steuk
  - Qualification — 73.52 m
  - Final — 77.54 m (→ 4th place)
- Detlef Gerstenberg
  - Qualification — 75.04 m
  - Final — 74.60 m (→ 5th place)

Men's Decathlon

- Steffen Grummt
  - Final — 7892 points (→ 8th place)
- Siegfried Stark
  - Final — retired (→ no ranking)
- Rainer Pottel
  - Final — retired (→ no ranking)

Men's 20 km Walk

- Roland Wieser
  - Final — 1:25:58.2 (→ Bronze Medal)
- Karl-Heinz Stadtmüller
  - Final — 1:29:21.7 (→ 8th place)
- Werner Heyer
  - Final — DSQ (→ no ranking)

Men's 50 km Walk

- Hartwig Gauder
  - Final — 3:49:24 (→ Gold Medal)
- Dietmar Meisch
  - Final — DSQ (→ no ranking)
- Uwe Dünkel
  - Final — DSQ (→ no ranking)

Women's Competition

Women's 100 metres

- Marlies Göhr
  - Heat — 11.41
  - Quarterfinals — 11.12
  - Semifinals — 11.18
  - Final — 11.07 (→ Silver Medal)
- Ingrid Auerswald
  - Heat — 11.32
  - Quarterfinals — 11.09
  - Semifinals — 11.27
  - Final — 11.14 (→ Bronze Medal)
- Romy Müller
  - Heat — 11.41
  - Quarterfinals — 11.12
  - Semifinals — 11.22
  - Final — 11.16 (→ 5th place)

Women's 800 metres

- Martina Kämpfert
  - Heat — 1:58.8
  - Semifinals — 1:58.1
  - Final — 1:56.3 (→ 4th place)
- Hildegard Ullrich
  - Heat — 2:00.1
  - Semifinals — 1:58.7
  - Final — 1:57.2 (→ 5th place)

Women's 1,500 metres

- Christiane Wartenberg
  - Heat — 4:00.4
  - Final — 3:57.8 (→ Silver Medal)
- Ulrike Bruns
  - Heat — 4:01.6
  - Final — 4:00.7 (→ 5th place)
- Beate Liebich
  - Heat — 4:06.8 (→ did not advance)

Women's 100 m Hurdles

- Johanna Schaller-Klier
  - Heat — 13.03
  - Semifinal — 12.77
  - Final — 12.63 (→ Silver Medal)
- Kerstin Knabe
  - Heat — 12.77
  - Semifinal — 12.99
  - Final — 12.66 (→ 4th place)
- Bettine Gärtz
  - Heat — 13.06
  - Semifinal — 13.04
  - Final — 13.14 (→ 7th place)

Women's Long Jump

- Brigitte Wujak
  - Qualification — 6.65 m
  - Final — 7.04 m (→ Silver Medal)
- Siegrun Siegl
  - Qualification — 6.53 m
  - Final — 6.87 m (→ 5th place)
- Siegrid Heimann
  - Qualification — 6.71 m
  - Final — 6.71 m (→ 7th place)

Women's High Jump

- Jutta Kirst
  - Qualification — 1.88 m
  - Final — 1.94 m (→ Bronze Medal)
- Rosemarie Ackermann
  - Qualification — 1.88 m
  - Final — 1.91 m (→ 4th place)
- Andrea Reichstein
  - Qualification — 1.88 m
  - Final — 1.91 m (→ 6th place)

Women's Discus Throw

- Evelin Jahl
  - Qualification — 60.22 m
  - Final — 69.96 m (→ Gold Medal)
- Gisela Beyer
  - Qualification — 62.86 m
  - Final — 67.08 m (→ 4th place)
- Margitta Pufe
  - Qualification — 65.52 m
  - Final — 66.12 m (→ 5th place)

Women's Javelin Throw

- Ute Hommola
  - Qualification — 63.52 m
  - Final — 66.56 m (→ Bronze Medal)
- Ute Richter
  - Qualification — 66.66 m
  - Final — 66.54 m (→ 4th place)
- Ruth Fuchs
  - Qualification — 64.26 m
  - Final — 63.94 m (→ 8th place)

Women's Shot Put

- Ilona Slupianek
  - Final — 22.41 m (→ Gold Medal)
- Margitta Pufe
  - Final — 21.20 m (→ Bronze Medal)
- Ines Reichenbach
  - Final — 19.66 m (→ 8th place)

Women's Pentathlon

- Ramona Neubert — 4698 points (→ 4th place)
  1. 100 metres — 13.93 s
  2. Shot Put — 13.68 m
  3. High Jump — 1.77 m
  4. Long Jump — 6.63 m
  5. 800 metres — 2:07.70
- Burglinde Pollak — 4553 points (→ 6th place)
  1. 100 metres — 13.74 s
  2. Shot Put — 16.67 m
  3. High Jump — 1.68 m
  4. Long Jump — 5.93 m
  5. 800 metres — 2:14.40
- Christine Laser — 1712 points (→ no ranking)
  1. 100 metres — 13.67 s
  2. Shot Put — 13.39 m
  3. High Jump — DNF

== Boxing ==
Men's Light Flyweight (– 48 kg)

- Dietmar Geilich
  1. First Round — Defeated Thapa Birender Singh (India) on points (3–2)
  2. Second Round — Defeated Pedro Manuel Nieves (Venezuela) on points (5–0)
  3. Quarter Finals — Lost to Shamil Sabirov (Soviet Union) on points (1–4)

Men's Bantamweight (– 54 kg)

- Mario Behrendt
  1. First Round — Lost to Dumitru Cipere (Romania) on points (0–5)

Men's Featherweight (– 57 kg)

- Rudi Fink → Gold Medal
  1. First Round — Defeated Hannu Kaislama (Finland) on points (5–0)
  2. Second Round — Defeated Esmail Mohamad (Afghanistan) after knock-out in first round
  3. Third Round — Defeated Carlos González (Mexico) after knock-out in first round
  4. Quarter Finals — Defeated Winfred Kabunda (Zambia) on points (4–1)
  5. Semi Finals — Defeated Viktor Rybakov (Soviet Union) on points (4–1)
  6. Final — Defeated Adolfo Horta (Cuba) on points (4–1)

Men's Lightweight (– 60 kg)

- Richard Nowakowski → Bronze Medal
  1. First Round — Defeated Christopher Ossai (Nigeria) on points (5–0)
  2. Second Round — Defeated Geofrey Nyeko (Uganda) after referee stopped contest in first round
  3. Quarter Finals — Defeated George Gilbody (Great Britain) on points (5–0)
  4. Semi Finals — Lost to Viktor Demyanenko (Soviet Union) after referee stopped contest in first round

Men's Light-Welterweight (– 63,5 kg)

- Dietmar Schwarz
  1. First Round — Defeated Teddy Makofi (Zambia) on points (5–0)
  2. Second Round — Lost to José Angel Molina (Puerto Rico) after referee stopped contest in third round

Men's Heavyweight (+ 81 kg)

- Jürgen Fanghänel → Bronze Medal
  1. First Round — Defeated Luis Castillo (Ecuador) on points (4–1)
  2. Quarter Finals — Defeated Petr Stoimenov (Bulgaria) after referee stopped contest in second round
  3. Semi Finals — Lost to Piotr Zaev (Soviet Union) on points (0–5)

== Canoeing ==
East Germany was represented by 13 canoeists, 10 men and 3 women.

Athlete	Event	Preliminary		Semifinal		Final	
Athlete	Event	Time	Rank	Time	Rank	Time	Rank
Olaf Heukrodt	Men's C-1 500 m	1:55.37	2 QF	—N/a	—N/a	1:54.38	Bronze medal
Eckhard Leue	Men's C-1 1000 m	4:04.09	2 QF	—N/a	—N/a	4:15.02	Bronze medal
Olaf Heukrodt; Uwe Madeja	Men's C-2 1000 m	3:47.43	4 QS	3:54.99	1 QF	3:49.93	Silver medal
Frank-Peter Bischof	Men's K-1 500 m	1:46.13	1 QF	1:46.21	1 QF	1:45.97	5
Birgit Fischer	Women's K-1 500 m	1:56.92	1 QF	—N/a	—N/a	1:57.96	Gold medal
Rüdiger Helm	Men's K-1 1000 m	3:45.20	1 QF	3:52.04	1 QF	3:48.77	Gold medal
Rüdiger Helm; Bernd Olbricht	Men's K-2 500 m	1:35.36	1 QF	1:35.88	1 QF	1:34.00	Bronze medal
Carsta Genäuß; Martina Bischof	Women's K-2 500 m	1:46.95	1 QF	—N/a	—N/a	1:43.88	Gold medal
Peter Hempel; Harry Nolte	Men's K-2 1000 m	3:25.71	2 QF	3:32.77	1 QF	3:31.02	5
Rüdiger Helm; Bernd Olbricht; Harald Marg; Bernd Duvigneau	Men's K-4 1000 m	3:04.86	1 QF	—N/a	—N/a	3:13.76	Gold medal

== Cycling ==
Thirteen cyclists represented East Germany in 1980.

Individual road race

- Thomas Barth
- Andreas Petermann
- Olaf Ludwig
- Bernd Drogan

Team time trial

- Falk Boden
- Bernd Drogan
- Olaf Ludwig
- Hans-Joachim Hartnick

Sprint

- Lutz Heßlich

1000 m time trial

- Lothar Thoms

Individual pursuit

- Harald Wolf

Team pursuit

- Gerald Mortag
- Uwe Unterwalder
- Matthias Wiegand
- Volker Winkler

== Diving ==
Men's Springboard

- Falk Hoffmann
  - Preliminary Round — 567.78 points (→ 3rd place)
  - Final — 858.510 points (→ 4th place)
- Frank Taubert
  - Preliminary Round — 524.04 points (→ 9th place, did not advance)
- Dieter Waskow
  - Preliminary Round — 522.87 points (→ 10th place, did not advance)

Men's Platform

- Falk Hoffmann
  - Preliminary Round — 546.12 points (→ 1st place)
  - Final — 835.650 points (→ Gold Medal)
- Dieter Waskow
  - Preliminary Round — 515.16 points (→ 6th place)
  - Final — 802.800 points (→ 5th place)
- Thomas Knuths
  - Preliminary Round — 521.01 points (→ 3rd place)
  - Final — 783.975 points (→ 6th place)

Women's Springboard

- Martina Proeber
  - Preliminary Round — 450.99 points (→ 3rd place)
  - Final — 698.895 points (→ Silver Medal)
- Karin Guthke
  - Preliminary Round — 435.21 points (→ 4th place)
  - Final — 685.245 points (→ Bronze Medal)
- Martina Jäschke
  - Preliminary Round — 427.47 points (→ 6th place)
  - Final — 668.115 points (→ 5th place)

Women's Platform

- Martina Jäschke
  - Preliminary Round — 359.88 points (→ 4th place)
  - Final — 596.250 points (→ Gold Medal)
- Ramona Wenzel
  - Preliminary Round — 358.86 points (→ 6th place)
  - Final — 542.070 points (→ 4th place)
- Kerstin Krause
  - Preliminary Round — 322.68 points (→ 9th place, did not advance)

== Fencing ==
14 fencers, 10 men and 4 women, represented East Germany in 1980.

Men's foil

- Hartmuth Behrens
- Klaus Kotzmann
- Klaus Haertter

Men's team foil

- Siegmar Gutzeit, Hartmuth Behrens, Adrian Germanus, Klaus Kotzmann, Klaus Haertter

Men's sabre

- Frank-Eberhard Höltje
- Peter Ulbrich
- Rüdiger Müller

Men's team sabre

- Rüdiger Müller, Hendrik Jung, Peter Ulbrich, Frank-Eberhard Höltje, Gerd May

Women's foil

- Mandy Niklaus
- Gabriele Janke
- Sabine Hertrampf

Women's team foil

- Mandy Niklaus, Gabriele Janke, Sabine Hertrampf, Beate Schubert

== Football ==
=== Preliminary round ===
Team	Pld	W	D	L	GF	GA	GD	Pts
East Germany	3	2	1	0	7	1	+6	5
Algeria	3	1	1	1	4	2	+2	3
Spain	3	0	3	0	2	2	0	3
Syria	3	0	1	2	0	8	−8	1

July 20, 1980
12:00

East Germany	1–1	Spain
Kühn 49'	Report	Marcos 50'

Republican Stadium, Kyiv
Attendance: 100,000
Referee: Ulf Eriksson (Sweden)

July 22, 1980
12:00

East Germany	1–0	Algeria
Terletzki 61'	Report

Republican Stadium, Kyiv
Attendance: 70,000
Referee: Romualdo Arppi Filho (Brazil)

July 24, 1980
12:00

East Germany	5–0	Syria
Hause 6'; Netz 25' 45'; Peter 75'; Terletzki 82'	Report

Republican Stadium, Kyiv
Attendance: 80,000
Referee: Ulf Eriksson (Sweden)

=== Bracket ===
Quarter-finals
July 27 - Moscow
Soviet Union	2
Kuwait	1
July 27 - Kyiv
East Germany	4
Iraq	0
July 27 - Leningrad
Czechoslovakia	3
Cuba	0
July 27 - Minsk
Yugoslavia	3
Algeria	0

Semi-finals
July 29 - Moscow
East Germany	1
Soviet Union	0
July 29 - Moscow
Czechoslovakia	2
Yugoslavia	0

Final
August 2 - Moscow
Czechoslovakia	1
East Germany	0

July 27, 1980
12:00

East Germany	4–0	Iraq
Schnuphase 4' (pen.); Netz 11'; Steinbach 17'; Terletzki 22'	Report

Republican Stadium, Kyiv
Attendance: 48,000
Referee: Romualdo Arppi Filho (Brazil)
July 29, 1980
12:00

Soviet Union	0–1	East Germany
	Report	Netz 16'

Lenin Stadium, Moscow
Attendance: 95,000
Referee: Ulf Eriksson (Sweden)
August 2, 1980
12:00

Czechoslovakia	1–0	East Germany
Svoboda 77'	Report

Lenin Stadium, Moscow
Attendance: 70,000
Referee: Eldar Azimzade (Soviet Union)

The final was played in a hard rain for the third straight Olympics. Both teams played with ten players after the 58th minute after one player from each team was red-carded.

GK	1	Bodo Rudwaleit
LB	2	Artur Ullrich
CB	3	Lothar Hause
LM	5	Frank Baum
RM	6	Rüdiger Schnuphase
CM	7	Frank Terletzki
CM	8	Wolfgang Steinbach
CF	11	Dieter Kühn
CB	12	Norbert Trieloff
RB	13	Matthias Müller
MF	14	Matthias Liebers
CF	17	Wolf-Rüdiger Netz
?	?	Jürgen Bähringer
?	?	Werner Peter
?	?	Frank Uhlig
?	?	Bernd Jakubowski
?	?	Andreas Trautmann
Manager:
(East Germany) Rudolf Krause

== Handball ==
Men's Team Competition

- Preliminary Round (Group A)
  - Defeated Spain (21–17)
  - Drew with Hungary (14–14)
  - Defeated Cuba (27–20)
  - Defeated Poland (22–21)
  - Defeated Denmark (24–20)
- Classification Match
  - Final: Defeated Soviet Union (23–22) → Gold Medal
- Team Roster
  - Siegfried Voigt
  - Günter Dreibrodt
  - Peter Rost
  - Klaus Gruner
  - Hans-Georg Beyer
  - Dietmar Schmidt
  - Hartmut Krüger
  - Lothar Doering
  - Ernst Gerlach
  - Frank-Michael Wahl
  - Ingolf Wiegert
  - Wieland Schmidt
  - Rainer Höft
  - Hans-Georg Jaunich

Women's Team Competition

- Results
  - Defeated Czechoslovakia (16–10)
  - Drew with Yugoslavia (15–15)
  - Defeated People's Rep. of Congo (28–6)
  - Defeated Hungary (19–9)
  - Lost again USSR (13–18)
- East Germany won Bronze Medal
- Team Roster
  - Birgit Heinecke
  - Roswitha Krause
  - Waltraud Kretzschmar
  - Katrin Krüger
  - Kornelia Kunisch
  - Evelyn Matz
  - Kristina Richter
  - Christina Rost
  - Sabine Röther
  - Renate Rudolph
  - Marion Tietz
  - Petra Uhlig
  - Claudia Wunderlich
  - Hannelore Zober

== Swimming ==
Men's 100 m Freestyle

- Frank Kühne
  - Heats — 52.93 (→ did not advance)

Men's 200 m Freestyle

- Frank Kühne
  - Heats — 1:53.63 (→ did not advance)
- Detlev Grabs
  - Heats — 1:53.38 (→ did not advance)

Women's 100 m Breaststroke

- Bettina Löbel
  - Heats — 1:14.32 (→ did not advance)
- Silvia Rinka
  - Heats — 1:12.88 (→ did not advance)

Women's 400 m Individual Medley

- Petra Schneider
  - Heats — 4:46.53
  - Final — 4:36.29 (→ Gold Medal)
- Grit Slaby
  - Heats — 4:52.01
  - Final — 4:48.54 (→ 4th place)
- Ulrike Tauber
  - Heats — 4:51.97
  - Final — 4:49.18 (→ 5th place)

== Volleyball ==
Women's Team Competition

- Preliminary Round (Group A)
  - Defeated Cuba (3–1)
  - Lost to Soviet Union (1–3)
  - Defeated Peru (3–2)
- Final
  - Lost to Soviet Union (1–3) → Silver Medal
- Team Roster
  - Ute Kostrzewa
  - Andrea Heim
  - Annette Schultz
  - Christine Mummhardt
  - Heike Lehmann
  - Barbara Czekalla
  - Karla Roffeis
  - Martina Schmidt
  - Anke Westendorf
  - Karin Püschel
  - Brigitte Fetzer
  - Katharina Bullin

== Weightlifting ==
-56 kg category

- Andreas Letz
  - Snatch: 115.0 kg, Clean and jerk: 150.0 kg
  - Total: 265.0 kg (→ 4th place)

-67.5 kg category

- Joachim Kunz
  - Snatch: 145.0 kg, Clean and jerk: 190.0 kg
  - Total: 335.0 kg → Silver Medal
- Gunter Ambrass
  - Total: 320.0 kg (→ 4th place)

-90 kg category

- Frank Mantek
  - Snatch: 165.0 kg, Clean and jerk: 205.0 kg
  - Total: 370.0 kg → Bronze Medal

-100 kg category

- Michael Hennig
  - Total: 362.5 kg (→ 4th place)
- Manfred Funke
  - Total: 377.5 kg (→ 6th place)

+110 kg category

- Jürgen Heuser
  - Snatch: 182.5 kg, Clean and jerk: 227.5 kg
  - Total: 410.0 kg → Silver Medal
