= Handball at the Friendship Games =

Handball at the Friendship Games is the handball tournament organized for the 1984 Summer Olympics boycotting countries. Given that the Eastern Bloc countries and allies were at that time amongst the most competitive teams the tournament's level was rather high.

It was contested in two events. Men's event took place in Rostock and Magdeburg, East Germany between 17 and 21 July 1984, with eight teams competing. The women's event was contested at Hala na Sihoti in Trenčín, Czechoslovakia between 21 and 25 August 1984, with six teams competing.

== Men's event ==
Eight teams were drawn into two groups.

The host nation, East Germany, had two teams in the tournament. However, the East Germany "B" team competed "off competition". Despite ending the tournament on the sixth place, this result was not included in the final rankings. The seventh team (i. e. Czechoslovakia) was instead counted as the sixth place team, etc.

=== Group phase ===
==== Group A ====
All matches played in Magdeburg.

Team	Pld	W	D	L	GF	GA	GD	Points
Soviet Union	3	3	0	0	69	53	+16	6
Hungary	3	2	0	1	72	66	+6	4
East Germany B	3	1	0	2	63	71	-8	2
Czechoslovakia	3	0	0	3	57	71	-14	0

Results	(Soviet Union)	(Hungary)	(East Germany) B	(Czechoslovakia)
Soviet Union		28:20	24:17	17:16
Hungary	20:28		26:18	26:20
East Germany B	17:24	18:26		28:21
Czechoslovakia	16:17	20:26	21:28	

==== Group B ====
All matches played in Rostock.

Team	Pld	W	D	L	GF	GA	GD	Points
East Germany A	3	3	0	0	88	56	+32	6
Poland	3	2	0	1	80	69	+11	4
Bulgaria	3	1	0	2	61	78	-17	2
Cuba	3	0	0	3	70	96	-26	0

Results	(East Germany) A	(Poland)	(Bulgaria)	(Cuba)
East Germany A		24:20	29:16	35:20
Poland	20:24		26:18	34:27
Bulgaria	16:29	18:26		27:23
Cuba	20:35	27:34	23:27	

=== Final round ===
==== Final ====
Date	Location	Team 1	Score	Team 2
21.07.1984	Magdeburg	East Germany A	18-17 (6-8)	Soviet Union

- East Germany A: Wieland Schmidt, Peter Hofmann — Günter Dreibrodt 6, Peter Rost, Udo Rothe 2/1, Holger Winselmann, Ingolf Wiegert 1, Frank-Michael Wahl 4, Stephan Hauck 3, Dietmar Schmidt, Hartmut Krüger 2, Peter Pysall
- Soviet Union: Aleksandr Shypenko, Mikhail Ishchenko — Oleg Gagin 1, Vladimir Belov 1, Mikhail Vasilyev 4, Yuri Shevtsov 2, Sergey Kushniryuk 2, Yuri Kidyaev 2, Aleksandr Rymanov 2, Aleksandr Karshakevich 1, Aleksandr Anpilogov 2/2, Voldemaras Novickis.
- Score: 3-6 (20'), 5-8 (20'), 6-8 (half-time); 11-10 (42'), 16-14 (52'), 17-14 (53'), 17-16 (56'), 18-16 (57'), 18-17 (58'), 18-17 (end of the game).

==== 3rd / 4th place ====
Date	Location	Team 1	Score	Team 2
21.07.1984	Magdeburg	Hungary	21-22 (aOT, 18-18, 12-9)	Poland

==== 5th / 6th place ====
Date	Location	Team 1	Score	Team 2
21.07.1984	Schwerin	East Germany B	22-25 (11-12)	Bulgaria

==== 7th / 8th place ====
Date	Location	Team 1	Score	Team 2
21.07.1984	Schwerin	Czechoslovakia	32-20 (16-11)	Cuba

=== Final ranking ===
Gold medal	East Germany A
Silver medal	Soviet Union
Bronze medal	Poland
4	Hungary
5	Bulgaria
6	Czechoslovakia
7	Cuba
–	East Germany B*

* – East Germany B competed "off competition" and was not included in the final ranking table.

=== Top scorer ===
Top scorers are:

- Péter Kovács (HUN) – 26 goals
- Andreas Nagora (DDR B) - 25 goals
- Daniel Waszkiewicz (POL) – 22 goals
- Roberto Casuso (CUB) – 21 goals
- János Gyurka (HUN) – 21 goals
- Ingolf Wiegert (DDR) – 20 goals
- Yuri Kidyaev (URS) – 16 goals

== Women's event ==
Six teams competed in a round-robin tournament.

	Team	Pld	W	D	L	GF	GA	GD	Points
Gold medal	Soviet Union	5	5	0	0	129	93	+36	10
Silver medal	Czechoslovakia	5	3	1	1	96	99	–3	7
Bronze medal	East Germany	5	2	1	2	101	95	+6	5
4	Hungary	5	1	1	3	96	97	–1	3
5	Poland	5	1	1	3	100	121	–21	3
6	Bulgaria	5	1	0	4	95	112	–17	2

=== Results ===
Results	(Soviet Union)	(Czechoslovakia)	(East Germany)	(Hungary)	(Poland)	(Bulgaria)
Soviet Union		24:15	24:21	22:20	31:16	28:21
Czechoslovakia	15:24		15:15	20:19	20:18	26:23
East Germany	21:24	15:15		16:22	27:21	22:13
Hungary	20:22	19:20	22:16		22:22	13:17
Poland	16:31	18:20	21:27	22:22		23:21
Bulgaria	21:28	23:26	13:22	17:13	21:23	

== Winning teams' squads ==
Event	Gold	Silver	Bronze
Men's	East Germany A Heiko Bonath; Rüdiger Borchardt; Günter Dreibrodt; Lutz Grosser; Stephan Hauck; Peter Hofmann; Hartmut Krüger; Peter Pysall; Peter Rost; Udo Rothe; Dietmar Schmidt; Wieland Schmidt; Dirk Schnell; Frank-Michael Wahl; Ingolf Wiegert; Holger Winselmann	Soviet Union Aleksandr Anpilogov; Leonid Berenstein; Vladimir Belov; Oleg Gagin; Mykhaylo Ishchenko; Aleksandr Karshakevich; Yuri Kidyaev; Serhiy Kushniryuk; Ivan Levin; Voldemaras Novickis; Aleksandr Rymanov; Yuri Shevtsov; Aleksandr Shypenko; Raimondas Valuckas; Mikhail Vasilev; Mykola Zhukov	Poland Ryszard Antczak; Lesław Dziuba; Jerzy Garpiel; Zbigniew Gawlik; Andrzej Kącki; Grzegorz Kosma; Andrzej Mientus; Henryk Mrowiec; Marek Pazdur; Zbigniew Plechoć; Andrzej Szymczak; Andrzej Tłuczyński; Zbigniew Tłuczyński; Zbigniew Urbanowicz; Daniel Waszkiewicz; Bogdan Wenta
Women's	Soviet Union Asmira Aksierova; Maryna Bazhanova; Tatyana Shalimova; Olga Dyedusienko; Tetyana Horb; Natalya Guskova; Larysa Karlova; Svitlana Mankova; Nataliya Matryuk; Lyubov Odynokova; Tamila Oleksiuk; Irina Popova; Yuliya Safina; Sigita Strečen; Zinaida Turchyna; Olha Zubaryeva	Czechoslovakia Mária Beňová; Mária Borošová; Mária Chlpeková; Štefánia Čorbová; Alena Damitšová; Mária Ďurišinová; Erika Gombošová; Anna Hradská; Jaroslava Ivančíková; Marta Jurišičová; Božena Mažgútová; Blažena Novosadová; Marta Pösová; Bibiána Ščerbáková; Jana Stašová; Daniela Trandžíková	East Germany Britta Franke; Cornelia Franz; Ramona Grobman; Evelyn Hübscher; Liane Kämpf; Katrin Krüger; Kornelia Kunisch; Annegret Matthäus; Annett Partusch; Sabina Picken; Kerstin Rast; Kerstin Schmidt; Marion Schulz; Andrea Stolletz; Sybille Wagner; Claudia Wunderlich

== Medal table ==
* Host nation (East Germany)

Rank	Nation	Gold	Silver	Bronze	Total
1	Soviet Union (URS)	1	1	0	2
2	East Germany (GDR)*	1	0	1	2
3	Czechoslovakia (TCH)*	0	1	0	1
4	Poland (POL)	0	0	1	1
Totals (4 entries)		2	2	2	6

== See also ==
- Handball at the 1984 Summer Olympics
