= Swimming at the 1980 Summer Olympics – Women's 200 metre breaststroke =

Women's 200 metre breaststroke at the Games of the XXII Olympiad
- Venue: Swimming Pool at the Olimpiysky Sports Complex
- Date: 23 July (heats and final)
- Competitors: 25 from 18 nations
- Winning time: 2:29.54 (OR)

Medalists
1st place, gold medalist(s)		Lina Kačiušytė	Soviet Union
2nd place, silver medalist(s)		Svetlana Varganova	Soviet Union
3rd place, bronze medalist(s)		Yuliya Bogdanova	Soviet Union

The women's 200 metre breaststroke event, included in the swimming competition at the 1980 Summer Olympics, took place on July 23, at the Swimming Pool at the Olimpiysky Sports Complex in Moscow, Soviet Union. In this event, swimmers covered four lengths of the 50-metre (160 ft) Olympic-sized pool employing the breaststroke. It was the thirteenth appearance of the event, which first appeared at the 1924 Summer Olympics in Paris. A total of 25 competitors from 18 nations participated in the event.

== Records ==
Prior to this competition, the existing world and Olympic records were:

World record	Lina Kačiušytė (URS)	2:28.36 s	Potsdam, East Germany	6 April 1979
Olympic record	Marina Kosheveya (URS)	2:33.35 s	Montreal, Canada	21 July 1976

The following records were established during the competition:

Date	Round	Name	Nationality	Time	OR	WR
23 July	Heat 3	Svetlana Varganova	Soviet Union	2:29.77	OR	
23 July	Final	Lina Kačiušytė	Soviet Union	2:29.54	OR	

== Results ==
=== Heats ===
Rank	Heat	Name	Nationality	Time	Notes
1	3	Svetlana Varganova	Soviet Union	2:29.77	Q, OR
2	3	Irena Fleissnerová	Czechoslovakia	2:32.79	Q, NR
3	4	Lina Kačiušytė	Soviet Union	2:33.04	Q
4	2	Yuliya Bogdanova	Soviet Union	2:33.45	Q
5	4	Susanne Nielsson	Denmark	2:34.42	Q
6	2	Silvia Rinka	East Germany	2:34.88	Q
7	1	Bettina Löbel	East Germany	2:35.31	Q
8	1	Ute Geweniger	East Germany	2:35.42	Q
9	3	Eva-Marie Håkansson	Sweden	2:35.64	NR
10	4	Ann-Sofi Roos	Sweden	2:35.99	
11	2	Debbie Rudd	Great Britain	2:36.32	
12	1	Margaret Kelly	Great Britain	2:37.67	
13	4	Tanya Dangalakova	Bulgaria	2:39.11	
14	4	Lisa Curry	Australia	2:39.42	
15	4	Brigitte Prass	Romania	2:39.90	NR
16	3	Odile Bihan	France	2:40.55	
17	4	Sabrina Seminatore	Italy	2:41.77	
18	2	Elke Holtz	Mexico	2:42.59	NR
19	1	Brigitte Bosmans	Belgium	2:42.87	
20	3	Catherine Bohan	Ireland	2:43.30	
21	1	Annick de Susini	France	2:44.03	
22	2	Gabriella Kindl	Hungary	2:44.08	
23	3	Lynne Tasker	Zimbabwe	2:48.86	NR
24	2	Hoàng Thị Hoà	Vietnam	2:55.94	
25	1	Nicole Rajoharison	Madagascar	3:12.40	

=== Final ===
Rank	Name	Nationality	Time	Notes
1st place, gold medalist(s)	Lina Kačiušytė	Soviet Union	2:29.54	OR
2nd place, silver medalist(s)	Svetlana Varganova	Soviet Union	2:29.61	
3rd place, bronze medalist(s)	Yuliya Bogdanova	Soviet Union	2:32.39	
4	Susanne Nielsson	Denmark	2:32.75	NR
5	Irena Fleissnerová	Czechoslovakia	2:33.23	
6	Ute Geweniger	East Germany	2:34.34	
7	Bettina Löbel	East Germany	2:34.51	
8	Silvia Rinka	East Germany	2:35.38	

== Sources ==
- "Official Report of the Organising Committee of the Games of the XXII Olympiad" (PDF). Volume Three. Fizkultura i Sport. 1981. Archived from the original (PDF) on 27 September 2007.
- Albert Schoenfeld, ed. (September 1980). "Results from the 1980 Olympic Games (Moscow)" (PDF). Swimming World & Junior Swimmer. Albert Schoenfeld. p. 73. ISSN 0039-7431.
- "Swimming at the 1980 Moskva Summer Games: Women's 200 metres Breaststroke". Olympics at Sports-Reference.com. Sports Reference, LLC. Archived from the original on 17 April 2020.
