= Eisenhüttenstadt =

Town in Germany

Eisenhüttenstadt Pśibrjog (Lower Sorbian)
- Town
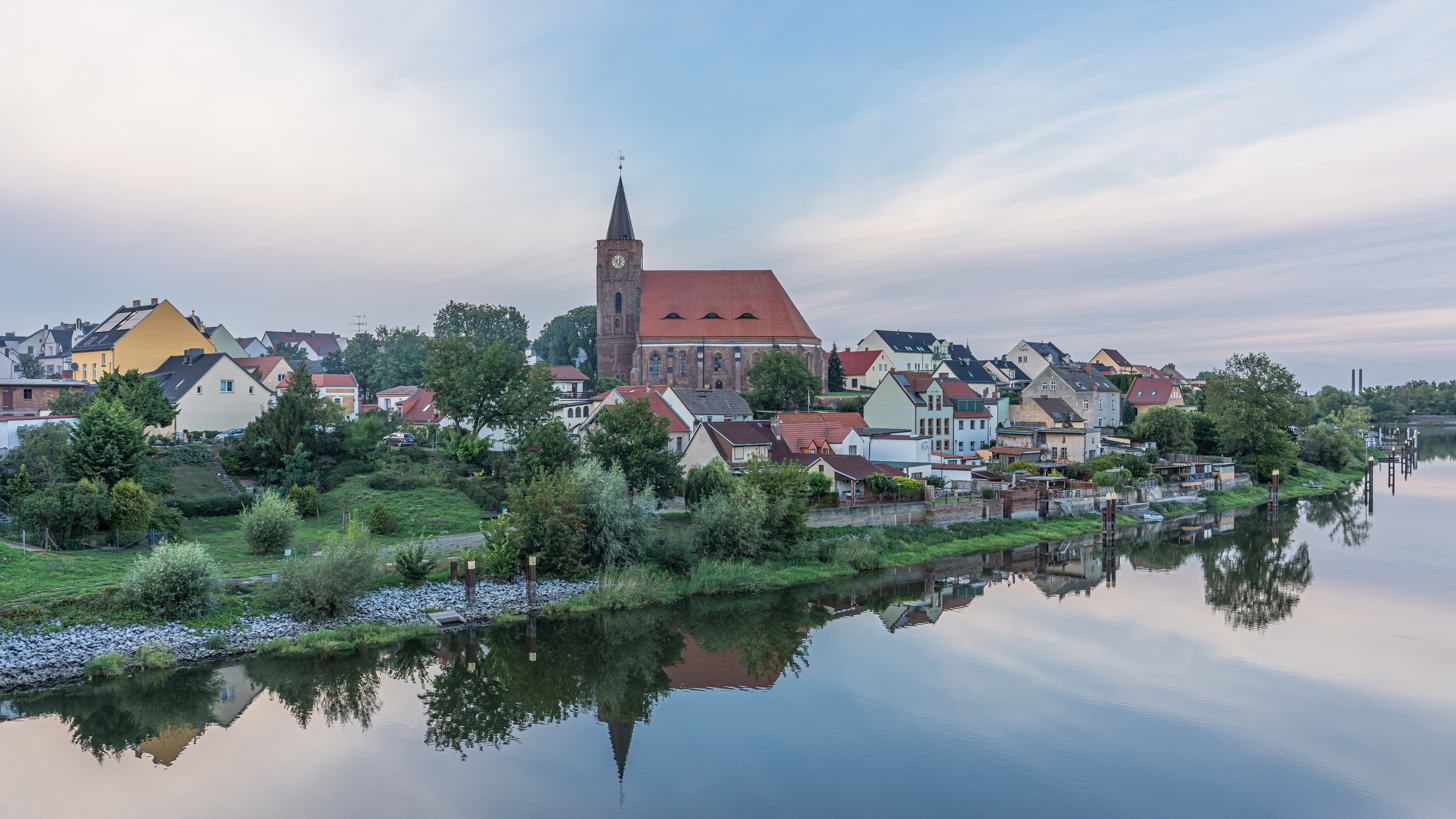
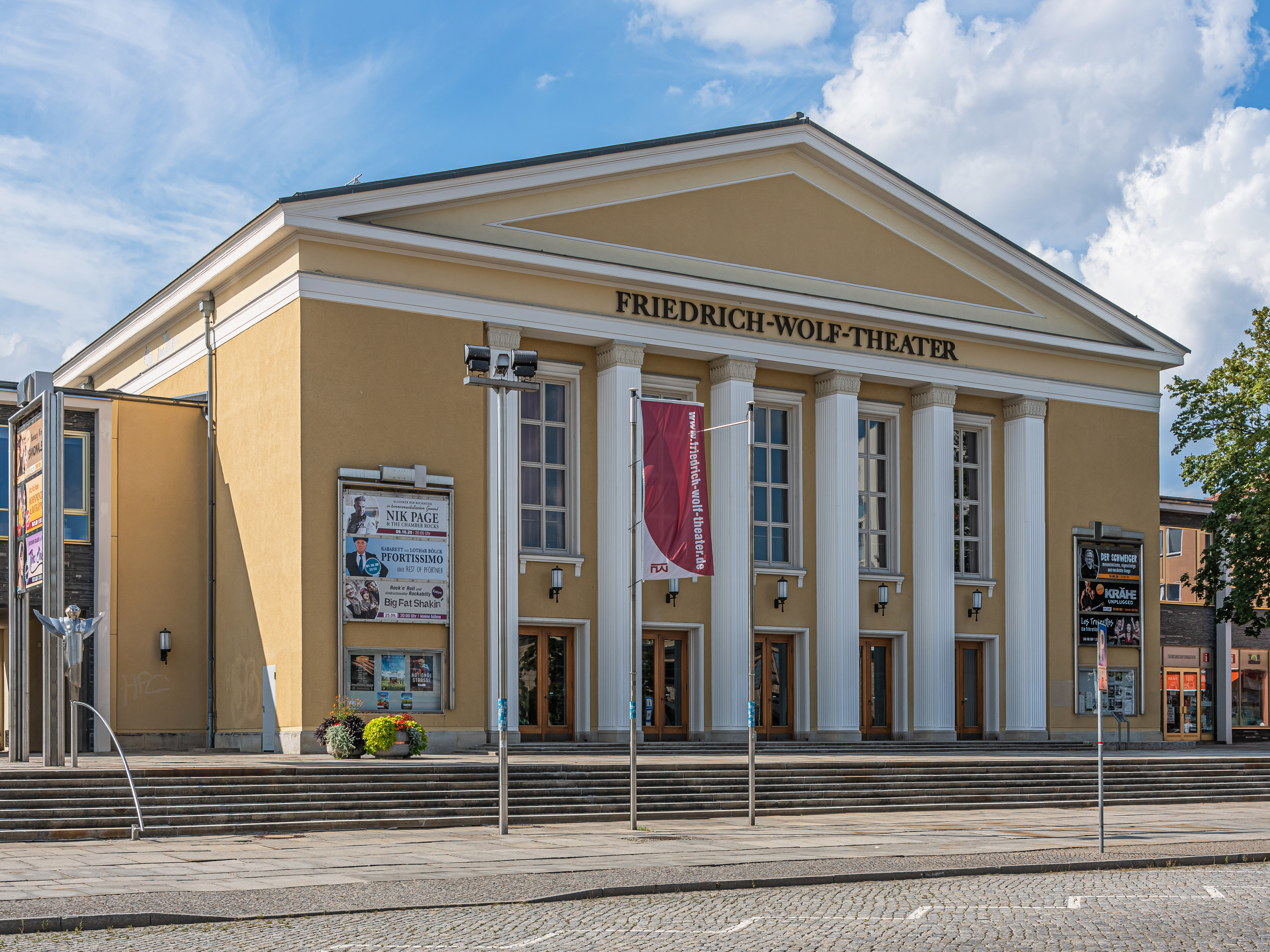
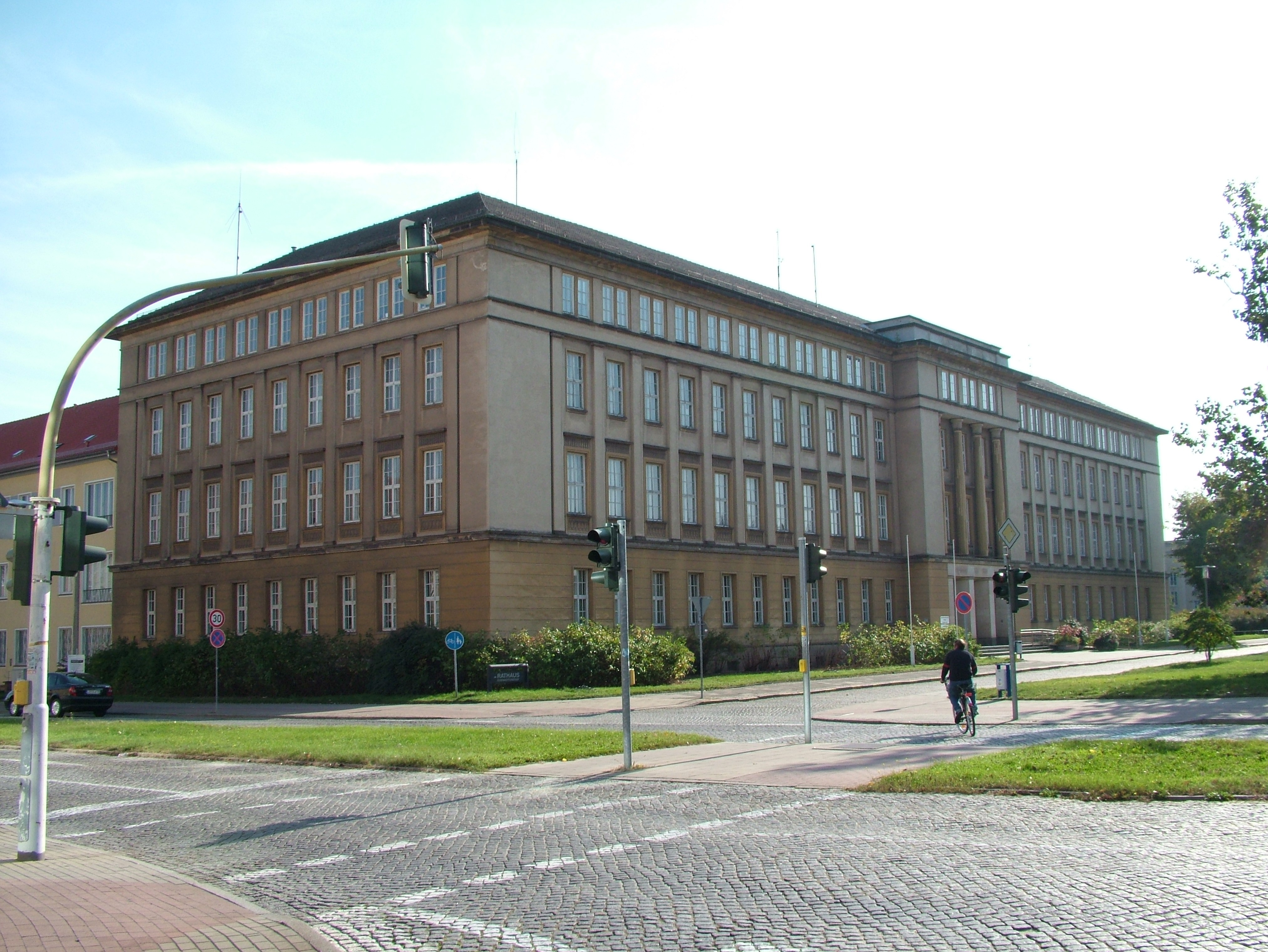
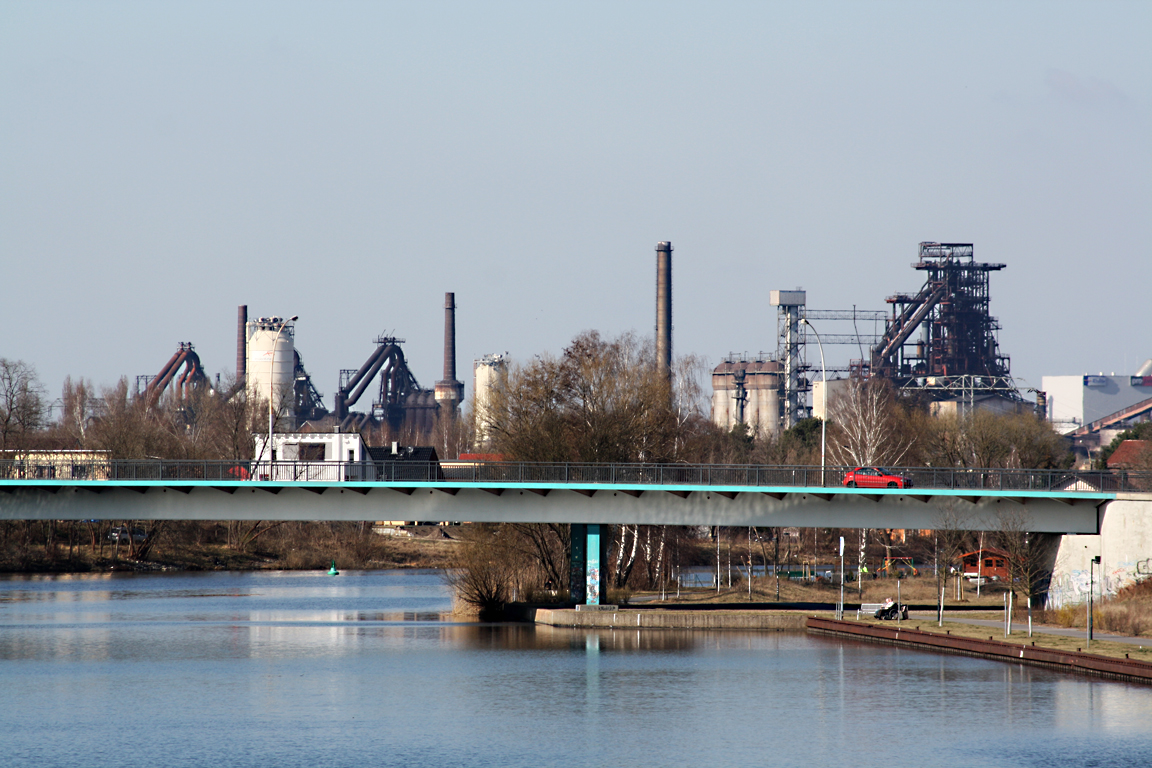
- Old core of Eisenhüttenstadt with St. Nikolai church Friedrich-Wolf-Theater Town hall Panorama with blast furnace

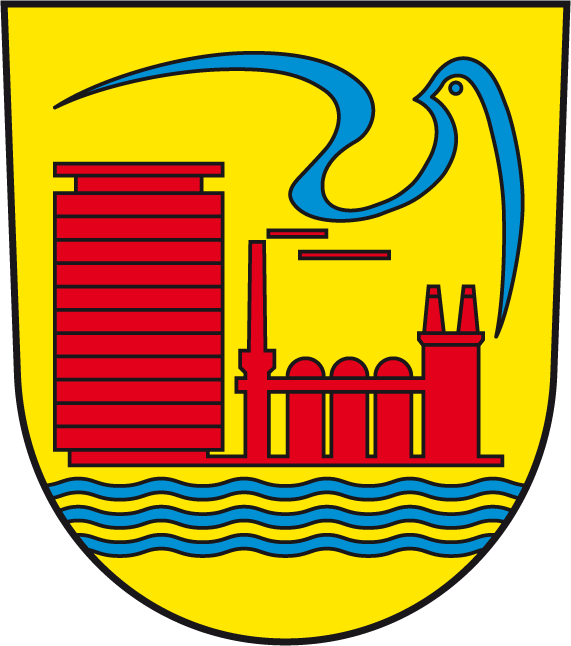
- Coat of arms

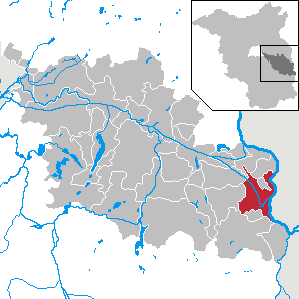
- Location of Eisenhüttenstadt within Oder-Spree district
- Interactive map of Eisenhüttenstadt
- Location within Germany Location within Brandenburg
- Coordinates: 52°08′42″N 14°40′22″E
- Country: Germany
- State: Brandenburg
- District: Oder-Spree
- Subdivisions: 4 districts

Government
  - Mayor (2017–25): Frank Balzer (SPD)

Area
  - Total: 63.48 km^{2} (24.51 sq mi)
- Elevation: 42 m (138 ft)

Population (2025-12-31)
  - Total: 24,791
  - Density: 390.5/km^{2} (1,011/sq mi)
- Time zone: UTC+01:00 (CET)
  - Summer (DST): UTC+02:00 (CEST)
- Postal codes: 15890
- Dialling codes: 03364
- Vehicle registration: LOS, EH
- Website: www.eisenhuettenstadt.de

Eisenhüttenstadt (German pronunciation: [aɪzn̩ˈhʏtn̩ʃtat]; lit. 'ironworks city') is a town in the Oder-Spree district of Brandenburg, Germany. It is located at the confluence of the Oder–Spree Canal and the River Oder on the border with Poland. Eisenhüttenstadt was founded as a planned city by East Germany in 1950, as a socialist model city and a state-owned steel mill complex. It was known as Stalinstadt (Lower Sorbian: Stalinměsto) between 1953 and 1961, in honor of Soviet leader Joseph Stalin, and received its current name during the de-Stalinization campaign.

== Geography ==
The municipal area is situated on a sandy terrace in the Berlin-Warsaw glacial valley (Urstromtal). It is bounded by the Oder river and Germany–Poland border to the east. Eisenhüttenstadt is the eastern terminus of the Oder–Spree Canal. The town centre is located about 25 kilometres (16 mi) south of Frankfurt (Oder) and 110 km (68 mi) southeast of Berlin. Eisenhüttenstadt is served by the Berlin–Wrocław railway line.

The town comprises the districts of Diehlo, Fürstenberg (Oder), and Schönfließ.

== History ==
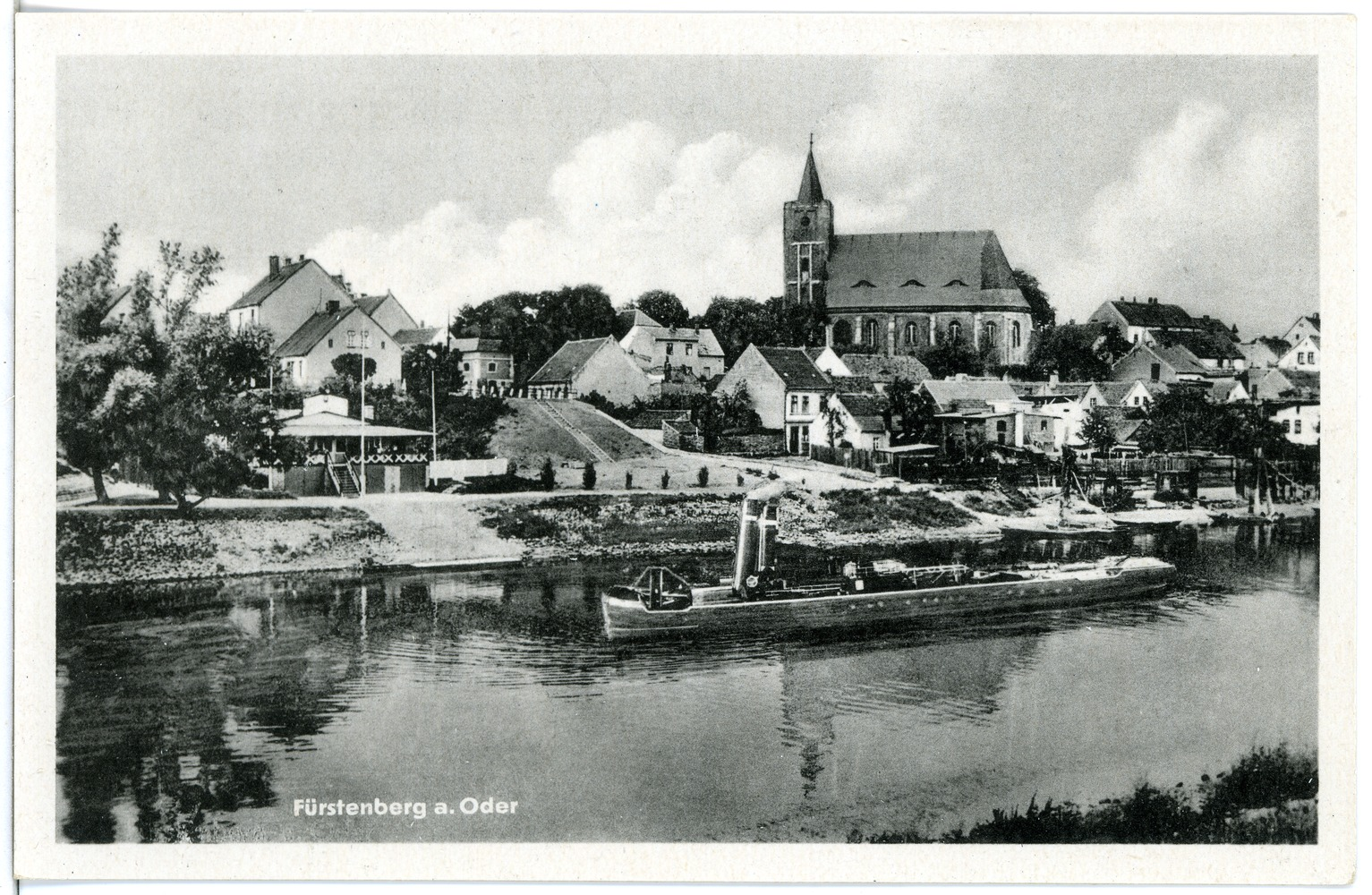
Fürstenberg in 1952

The town was built near the historic village of Fürstenberg (Oder) which was founded in 1251. In 1319, Fürstenberg (Polish: Przybrzeg) became part of the Duchy of Jawor within fragmented Piast-ruled Poland. Later on, it passed to the Kingdom of Bohemia, and Charles IV bought the town from the Cistercians of Neuzelle and allowed the construction of a bridge over the Oder to create a new trade route to Poland. In 1469, it passed to King Matthias Corvinus of Hungary, and, in 1490, it returned to Bohemia. After the Peace of Prague in 1635, Fürstenberg became part of the Electorate of Saxony. In 1815, it was transferred to Prussia, and, in 1871, it became part of the German Empire. In 1925, a port on the Oder was created.

During World War II, the Germans operated the Stalag III-B prisoner-of-war camp for Polish, French, Belgian, Serbian, Soviet, American, Dutch, Italian and British POWs in Fürstenberg with several forced labour subcamps in the town and region, a forced labour camp for Jewish men, and a subcamp of the Sachsenhausen concentration camp.

The present-day town was founded as a socialist model city in 1950 following a decision by the East German Socialist Unity Party (SED), alongside a new steel mill combine located west of the historic town of Fürstenberg (Oder). A few years before the new town was established, a bridge over the Oder river had been constructed, the earlier one having been destroyed by retreating Wehrmacht forces in February 1945, near the end of World War II.

The population grew rapidly in the 1950s and 1960s. It was renamed Stalinstadt following the death of Joseph Stalin. In 1961, during de-Stalinization, the town was renamed Eisenhüttenstadt. After German reunification in 1990, the state-owned steel works were privatized, and most of its 12,000 employees lost their jobs. Thereafter the factory employed around 2,500 workers. The town experienced a steep decline in population, from just over 50,000 to under 30,000. Consequently, many apartment blocks have now been demolished, although some in the inner city dating from the 1950s have been renovated and restored.

== Demography ==
Development of Population since 1875 within the Current Boundaries (Blue Line: Population; Dotted Line: Comparison to Population Development of Brandenburg state; Grey Background: Time of Nazi rule; Red Background: Time of Communist rule)

Recent Population Development and Projections (Population Development before Census 2011 (blue line); Recent Population Development according to the Census in Germany in 2011 (blue bordered line); Official projections for 2005-2030 (yellow line); for 2017-2030 (scarlet line); for 2020-2030 (green line)

Eisenhüttenstadt: Population development
within the current boundaries (2020)

Year	Pop.	±% p.a.
1875	3,850	—
1890	5,253	+2.09%
1910	7,971	+2.11%
1925	8,997	+0.81%
1939	8,736	−0.21%
1950	10,579	+1.76%
1964	36,937	+9.34%

Year	Pop.	±% p.a.
1971	45,762	+3.11%
1981	48,131	+0.51%
1985	49,086	+0.49%
1990	51,151	+0.83%
1995	47,376	−1.52%
2000	41,493	−2.62%
2005	34,818	−3.45%

Year	Pop.	±% p.a.
2010	31,132	−2.21%
2015	30,416	−0.46%
2016	26,325	−13.45%
2017	25,057	−4.82%
2018	24,633	−1.69%
2019	23,878	−3.06%
2020	23,373	−2.11%

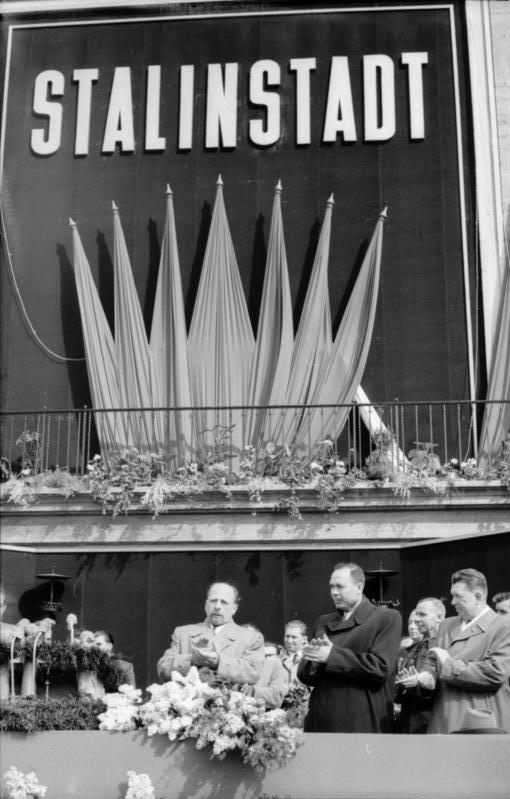
1953 celebration: Walter Ulbricht with Soviet ambassador Ivan Ilyichev

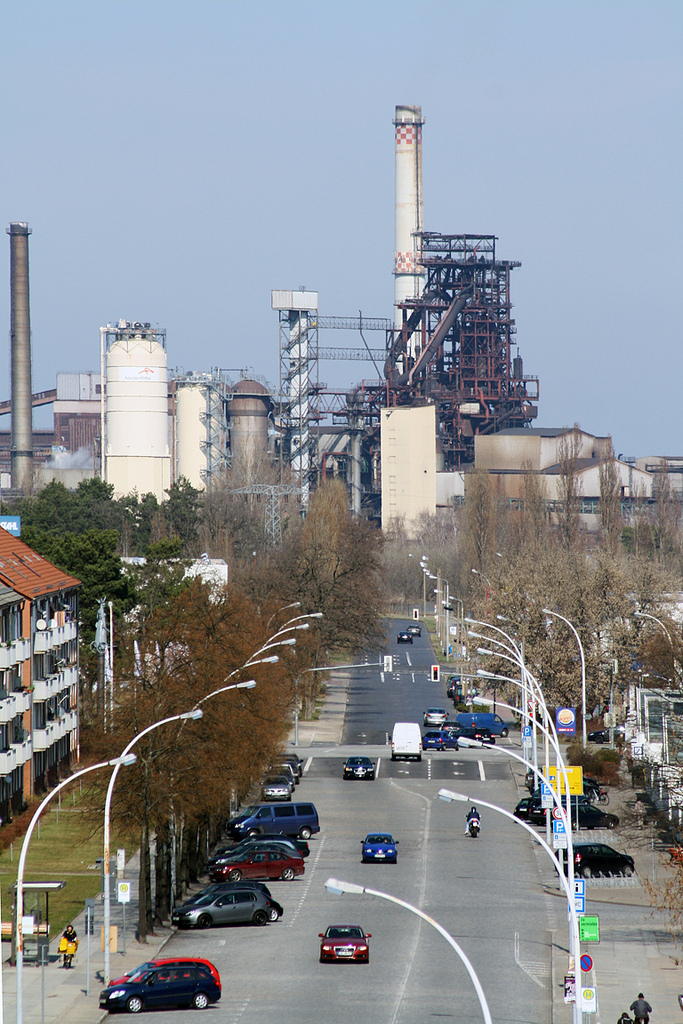
View over Eisenhüttenstadt in 2012

== Architecture ==
The first design for the new residential quarter was developed by the modernist and Bauhaus architect, Franz Ehrlich, in August 1950. His modernist plan, which laid out a dispersed town landscape along functional lines, was rejected by the Ministry for Reconstruction. The same happened to the plan presented by the architects Kurt Junghanns and Otto Geiler. The plan that was ultimately realized was developed by Kurt Walter Leucht.

== Twin towns – sister cities ==
Eisenhüttenstadt is twinned with:

- Dimitrovgrad, Bulgaria (1958)
- Drancy, France (1963)
- Głogów, Poland (1972)
- Saarlouis, Germany (1986), first East and West German town twinning

== Notable people ==
Eisenhüttenstadt is the birthplace of:

- Udo Beyer (born 1955), shot put, Olympian champion 1976 and holder of world record
- Hans-Georg Beyer (born 1956), handball player, olympic winner 1980
- Detlef Gerstenberg (1957–1993), hammer thrower, competitor in 1980 Summer Olympics
- Frank Schaffer (born 1958), athlete, medal winner in 1980 Summer Olympics
- Katharina Bullin (born 1959), volleyball player
- Gisela Beyer (born 1960), athlete
- Hendrik Reiher (born 1962), rowing cox, medal winner in multiple Olympic Games
- Torsten René Gutsche (born 1968), sprint canoer, competitor in two Summer Olympic Games; 1992 winner of the Bambi Award
- Sven Helbig (born 1968), producer, musician
- Kathrin Boron (born 1969), sculler, competitor in multiple Olympic Games, gold medalist in several World Rowing Championships
- Sören Lausberg (born 1969), retired track cyclist, competitor in two Summer Olympic Games
- Paul van Dyk (born 1971), DJ, composer and music producer
- Katja Adler (born 1974), politician
- Amadeus Wallschläger (born 1985), footballer
- Roger Kluge (born 1986), racing cyclist, silver medal winner in 2008 Summer Olympics
- Florian Müller (born 1986), footballer
- Pia Kästner (volleyball player, born 1998)

=== Other personalities associated with the city ===
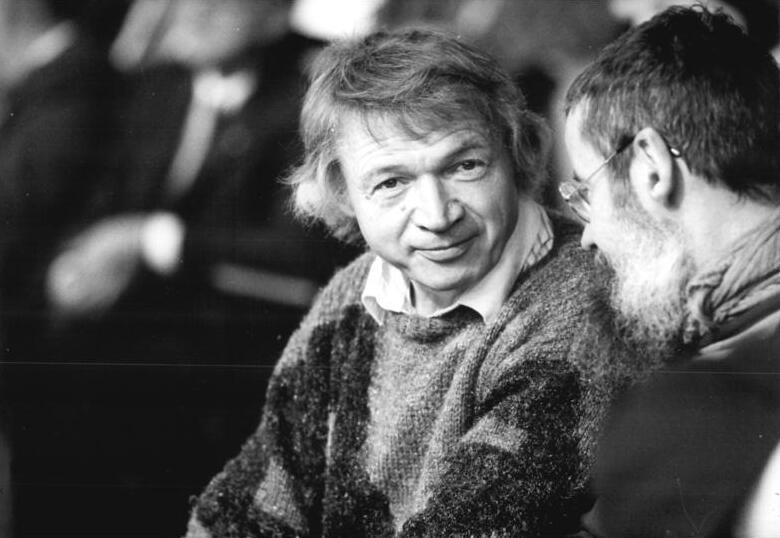
Rudolf Bahro, Berlin 1989, SED Party convention

- Bernhard Lösener (1890–1952), jurist.
- Rudolf Bahro (1935–1997), regime critic and author of the book The alternative. A critique of real-existing socialism., spent his school days in the city.
- Tamara Bunke (1937–1967), fellow combatant of Che Guevara in Bolivia, took her Abitur (school leaving examination) in Eisenhüttenstadt.
- Rolf Henrich (born 1944), lawyer, first signatory of the Founding Congress of the New Forum.
