= Vesna Radović =

Austrian handball player (born 1954)

Olympic medal record

Women's Handball
Silver medal – second place	1980 Moscow	Team

Vesna Radović (Serbian Cyrillic: Весна Радовић, German: Vesna Radovic, born 7 September 1954 in Belgrade) is a former Yugoslav/Austrian handball player who competed in the 1980 Summer Olympics and in the 1984 Summer Olympics. She played domestically for RK Radnički Beograd.

In 1980 she won the silver medal with the Yugoslav team. She played three matches as goalkeeper. After the Olympics, she left Yugoslavia for Austria.

Four years later she finished sixth with the Austrian team in the 1984 Olympic tournament. She played all five matches as goalkeeper.
