= Odile Bihan =

French swimmer

Personal information
- Born: 23 March 1963 (age 63)

Sport
- Sport: Swimming

Odile Bihan (born 23 March 1963) is a French swimmer. She competed in the women's 200 metre breaststroke at the 1980 Summer Olympics.
