= Frank Rost =

German footballer (born 1973)

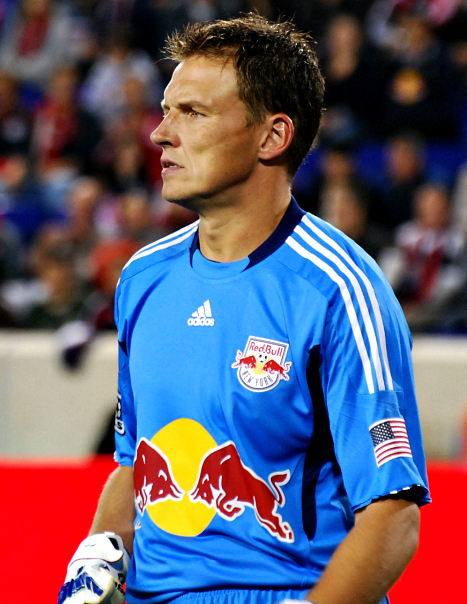
- Rost playing for New York Red Bulls in 2011

Personal information
- Full name: Frank Rost
- Date of birth: 30 June 1973 (age 53)
- Place of birth: Karl-Marx-Stadt, East Germany
- Height: 1.94 m (6 ft 4 in)
- Position: Goalkeeper

Youth career
- 1981–1982: BSG Lokomotive West Leipzig
- 1982–1986: BSG Chemie Böhlen
- 1986–1991: 1. FC Lokomotive Leipzig

Senior career*
Years	Team	Apps	(Gls)
1991–1992	1. FC Markkleeberg	33	(0)
1992–1995	Werder Bremen II	94	(0)
1992–2002	Werder Bremen	147	(1)
2002–2007	Schalke 04	130	(0)
2007–2011	Hamburger SV	149	(0)
2011	New York Red Bulls	11	(0)
Total		564	(1)

International career
2002–2003	Germany	4	(0)
- * Club domestic league appearances and goals

Frank Rost (born 30 June 1973) is a German former professional footballer who played as a goalkeeper.

He comes from a sporting family background; his father Peter won a gold medal at the 1980 Olympic Games in handball, and his mother Christina, also a handball player, won the silver at the 1976 Summer Olympics and bronze at the 1980 Games.

== Club career ==
=== Early career and Werder Bremen ===
Born in Karl-Marx-Stadt, Rost started his career at 1. FC Markkleeberg in the third German level.

His play with Markkleeberg led to interest from Werder Bremen who signed Rost in 1992. After playing with Werder Bremen II Rost made his Bundesliga debut during the 1995–96 season and became first-choice keeper during the 1998–99 season. At the end of this season he helped Bremen win the 1998–99 DFB-Pokal. The final against Bayern Munich went to penalties and Rost scored a penalty himself before saving from Lothar Matthäus to win Bremen the cup.

Rost was the second goalkeeper (after Jens Lehmann) to score from open play in the Bundesliga, when he scored on 31 March 2002 against Hansa Rostock. His goal was one of two goals Werder Bremen scored in the last minutes of the match to complete a comeback from a 3–1 deficit and win 4–3. At the end of the 2001–02 season the club finished in sixth place and qualified for the UEFA Cup.

=== Schalke 04 ===
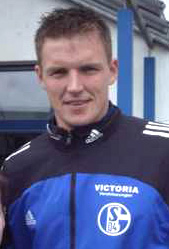
Rost with Schalke 04

Rost moved to Schalke 04 in July 2002. He was a regular first-choice keeper at Schalke until he lost his starting position to youngster Manuel Neuer in late 2006.

=== Hamburger SV ===
In January 2007 Rost moved to then struggling Hamburger SV where he immediately became first-choice keeper and helped the team move from last to seventh place.

On 30 July 2009, Rost made his 100th international club appearance in a third round Europa League qualifier. Hamburg beat Danish side Randers FC 4–0. Rost is the German record holder for combined UEFA Cup and UEFA Europa League appearances and the player with the second-most appearances overall behind Giuseppe Bergomi having played 90 matches.

Ahead of the 2010–11 season, Rost competed with the newly signed Jaroslav Drobný for the spot as number one goalkeeper. His teammates gave him the nickname "Frost". He left Hamburger SV at the end of the season, hoping to move abroad or to become a coach.

During his time in the Bundesliga Rost appeared in 426 league matches.

=== New York Red Bulls and retirement ===
On 13 July 2011, German daily tabloid Bild reported that Rost would be joining New York Red Bulls in Major League Soccer. Red Bulls confirmed the signing that day. In the 2011 season with New York, Rost appeared in 11 regular season matches and posted five clean sheets. The club announced in January 2012 that it had been unable to agree terms with Rost and that he would not return for the 2012 season.

Rost announced his retirement on 19 February 2012.

== International career ==
Rost was part of the East Germany national team at the 1989 FIFA U-16 World Championship, appearing in four matches. Rost earned a total of four caps with the Germany national team, making his debut against the United States in 2002.

== Career statistics ==
=== Club ===
Appearances and goals by club, season and competition
Club	Season	League			National cup		League cup		Europe		Other (Note: Includes German League Cup, UEFA Intertoto Cup and MLS Cup Playoffs)		Total	
Club	Season	Division	Apps	Goals	Apps	Goals	Apps	Goals	Apps	Goals	Apps	Goalss	Apps	Goals
1. FC Markkleeberg	1991–92	NOFV-Oberliga Süd	33	0	—		—		—		—		33	0
Werder Bremen II	1992–93	Oberliga Nord	30	0	1	0	—		—		—		31	0
Werder Bremen II	1993–94	Oberliga Nord	30	0	1	0	—		—		—		31	0
Werder Bremen II	1994–95	Regionalliga Nord	34	0	1	0	—		—		—		35	0
Werder Bremen II	Total		94	0	3	0	—		—		—		97	0
Werder Bremen	1992–93	Bundesliga	0	0	0	0	—		—		—		0	0
Werder Bremen	1993–94	Bundesliga	0	0	0	0	—		0	0	—		0	0
Werder Bremen	1994–95	Bundesliga	0	0	0	0	—		0	0	0	0	0	0
Werder Bremen	1995–96	Bundesliga	15	0	2	0	—		4	0	—		21	0
Werder Bremen	1996–97	Bundesliga	0	0	0	0	—		1	0	—		1	0
Werder Bremen	1997–98	Bundesliga	2	0	0	0	—		—		—		2	0
Werder Bremen	1998–99	Bundesliga	28	0	6	0	—		11	0	—		45	0
Werder Bremen	1999–00	Bundesliga	34	0	5	0	2	0	9	0	—		50	0
Werder Bremen	2000–01	Bundesliga	34	0	2	0	—		6	0	—		42	0
Werder Bremen	2001–02	Bundesliga	34	1	2	0	—		2	0	—		38	1
Werder Bremen	Total		147	1	17	0	2	0	33	0	0	0	199	1
Schalke 04	2002–03	Bundesliga	33	0	3	0	2	0	6	0	—		44	0
Schalke 04	2003–04	Bundesliga	27	0	2	0	—		10	0	—		39	0
Schalke 04	2004–05	Bundesliga	31	0	5	0	—		14	0	—		50	0
Schalke 04	2005–06	Bundesliga	32	0	2	0	2	0	14	0	—		50	0
Schalke 04	2006–07	Bundesliga	7	0	2	0	2	0	2	0	—		13	0
Schalke 04	Total		130	0	14	0	6	0	46	0	0	0	196	0
Hamburger SV	2006–07	Bundesliga	17	0	0	0	—		—		—		17	0
Hamburger SV	2007–08	Bundesliga	34	0	4	0	—		14	0	—		52	0
Hamburger SV	2008–09	Bundesliga	34	0	5	0	—		14	0	—		53	0
Hamburger SV	2009–10	Bundesliga	34	0	2	0	—		14	0	—		50	0
Hamburger SV	2010–11	Bundesliga	30	0	1	0	—		—		—		31	0
Hamburger SV	Total		149	0	12	0	0	0	42	0	0	0	203	0
New York Red Bulls	2011	Major League Soccer	11	0	0	0	—		—		3	0	14	0
Career total			564	1	46	0	8	0	121	0	3	0	742	1

=== International ===
Appearances and goals by national team and year
National team	Year	Apps	Goals
Germany	2002	1	0
Germany	2003	3	0
Total		4	0

== Honours ==
Werder Bremen

- DFB-Pokal: 1993–94, 1998–99
- UEFA Intertoto Cup: 1998

Schalke 04

- UEFA Intertoto Cup: 2003, 2004
