= Ernst Gerlach =

German handball player (born 1947)

Olympic medal record

Men's handball

Representing East Germany
Gold medal – first place	1980 Moscow	Team

World Championship
Bronze medal – third place	1978 Denmark	

Ernst Gerlach (born 19 March 1947 in Schönebeck) is a former East German handball player who competed in the 1980 Summer Olympics. He played as a centre back.

He was a member of the East German handball team which won the gold medal. He played one match and scored two goals.

At the 1978 World Championship he came third with the German team.

At club level he played for SC Magdeburg, where he won the 1970, 1977, 1980, 1981 and 1982 East German championships.

In 1980 he was awarded the DDR Patriotic Order of Merit in silver.
