= Slavica Jeremić =

Serbian handball player (born 1957)

Olympic medal record

Women's Handball
Silver medal – second place	1980 Moscow	Team

Slavica Jeremić (Serbian Cyrillic: Славица Јеремић; born 3 May 1957 in Oparić village near Rekovac, Serbia, FPR Yugoslavia) is a Yugoslav/Serbian former handball player who competed in the 1980 Summer Olympics.

In 1980 she won the silver medal with the Yugoslav team. She played all five matches and scored one goal.
