= Handball at the 1980 Summer Olympics =

Tournament details
- Host country: Soviet Union
- Venues: 2 (in 1 host city)
- Dates: 20–30 July 1980
- Teams: 18

Final positions
- Champions: East Germany (men); Soviet Union (women)
- Runners-up: Soviet Union (men); Yugoslavia (women)
- Third place: Romania (men); East Germany (women)
- Fourth place: Hungary (men); Hungary (women)

Handball at the 1980 Summer Olympics was represented by 2 events - a men's and a women's team competitions. They were held in two venues: in the Sokolniki Sports Palace (central part of Moscow) and in the Dynamo Sports Palace at Khimki-Khovrino (north-eastern part of Moscow). The schedule began on July 20 and ended on July 30. 100,493 spectators watched 51 matches of handball events at venues, mentioned above.

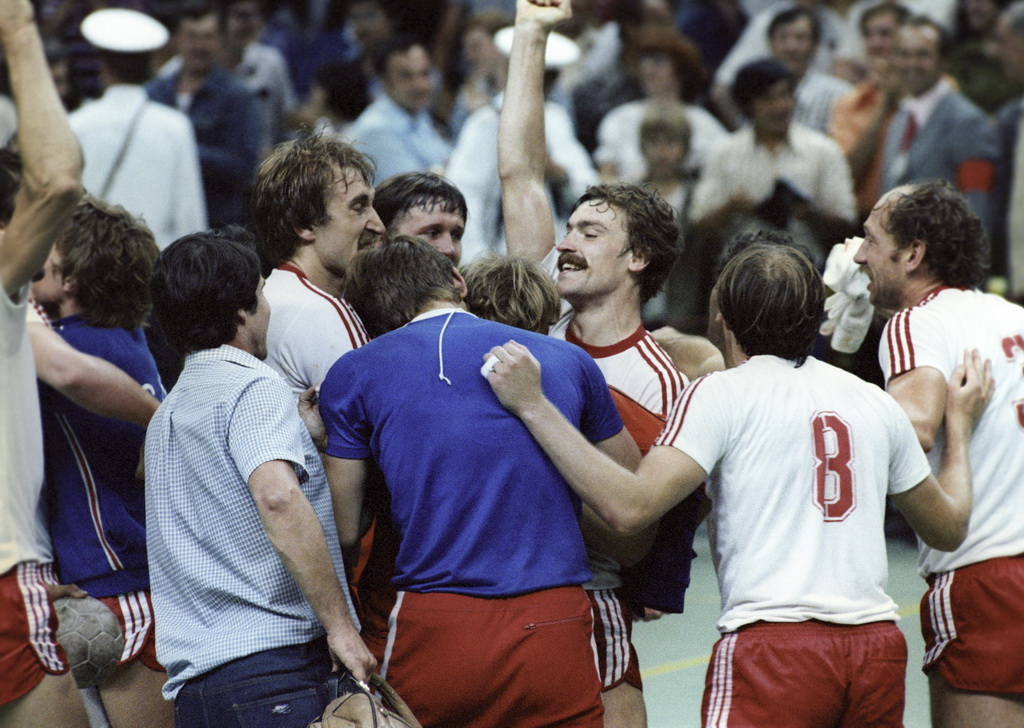
Soviet Union men's team celebrating their victory over Yugoslavia. RIAN photo.

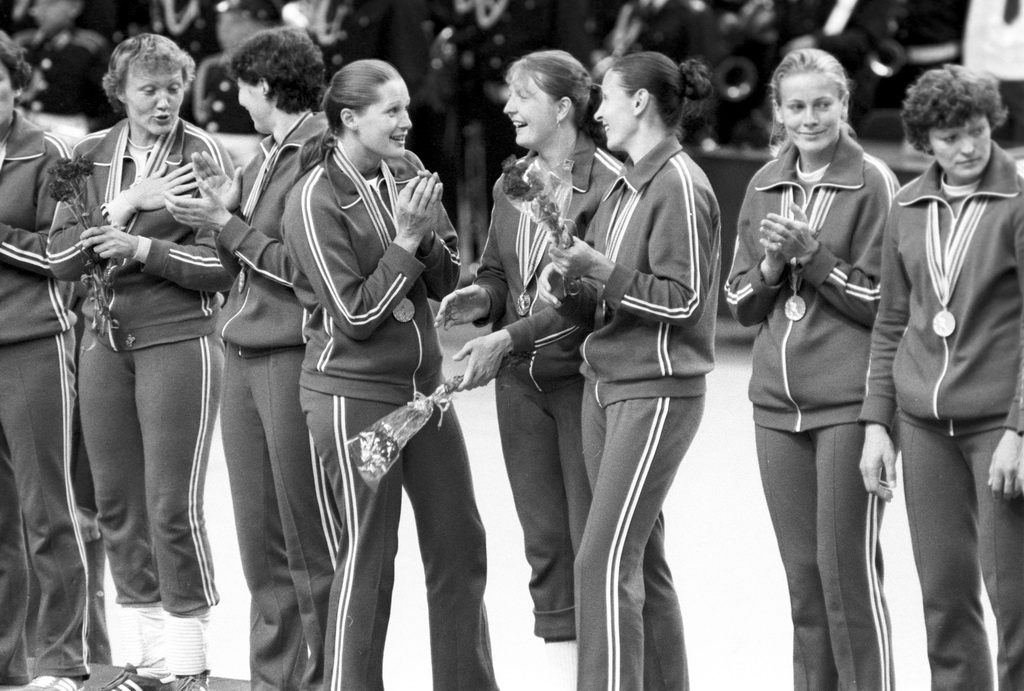
Soviet Union women's team during the victory ceremony. RIAN photo.

== Medal summary ==
Event	Gold	Silver	Bronze
Men	East Germany Hans-Georg Beyer; Lothar Doering; Günter Dreibrodt; Ernst Gerlach; Klaus Gruner; Rainer Höft; Hans-Georg Jaunich; Hartmut Krüger; Peter Rost; Dietmar Schmidt; Wieland Schmidt; Siegfried Voigt; Frank-Michael Wahl; Ingolf Wiegert	Soviet Union Aleksandr Anpilogov; Vladimir Belov; Yevgeni Chernyshov; Anatoli Fedyukin; Mykhaylo Ishchenko; Aleksandr Karshakevich; Yury Kidyayev; Vladimir Kravtsov; Serhiy Kushniryuk; Viktor Makhorin; Voldemaras Novickis; Vladimir Repev; Mykola Tomyn; Aleksey Zhuk	Romania Ştefan Birtalan; Iosif Boroş; Adrian Cosma; Cezar Drăgăniṭă; Marian Dumitru; Cornel Durău; Alexandru Fölker; Claudiu Ionescu; Nicolae Munteanu; Vasile Stîngă; Lucian Vasilache; Neculai Vasilcă; Radu Voina; Maricel Voinea
Women	Soviet Union Larysa Karlova; Tetyana Kocherhina; Valentyna Lutayeva; Aldona Nenėnienė; Lyubov Odynokova; Iryna Palchykova; Lyudmila Poradnyk; Yuliya Safina; Larisa Savkina; Sigita Strečen; Nataliya Tymoshkina; Zinaida Turchyna; Olha Zubaryeva; Natalya Lukyanenko	Yugoslavia Svetlana Anastasovska; Mirjana Đurica; Radmila Drljača; Katica Ileš; Slavica Jeremić; Svetlana Kitić; Jasna Merdan; Vesna Milosević; Mirjana Ognjenović; Vesna Radović; Radmila Savić; Ana Titlić; Biserka Višnjić; Zorica Vojinović	East Germany Birgit Heinecke; Roswitha Krause; Waltraud Kretzschmar; Katrin Krüger; Kornelia Kunisch; Evelyn Matz; Kristina Richter; Christina Rost; Sabine Röther; Renate Rudolph; Marion Tietz; Petra Uhlig; Claudia Wunderlich; Hannelore Zober

== Participating nations ==
Each qualified country was allowed to enter one team of 14 players and they all were eligible for participation. Four nations competed in both tournaments.

A total of 248(*) handball players (166 men and 82 women) from 14 nations (men from 12 nations - women from 6 nations) competed at the Moscow Games:

- Algeria (14) (men:14 women:0)
- Republic of the Congo (14) (men:0 women:14)
- Cuba (13) (men:13 women:0)
- Czechoslovakia (13) (men:0 women:13)
- Denmark (14) (men:14 women:0)
- East Germany (28) (men:14 women:14)
- Hungary (28) (men:14 women:14)
- Kuwait (14) (men:14 women:0)
- Poland (14) (men:14 women:0)
- Romania (14) (men:14 women:0)
- Soviet Union (27) (men:14 women:14)
- Spain (13) (men:13 women:0)
- Switzerland (14) (men:14 women:0)
- Yugoslavia (28) (men:14 women:14)

(*) NOTE: There are only players counted, which participated in one game at least.

== Medal table ==
Rank	Nation	Gold	Silver	Bronze	Total
1	Soviet Union	1	1	0	2
2	East Germany	1	0	1	2
3	Yugoslavia	0	1	0	1
4	Romania	0	0	1	1
Totals (4 entries)		2	2	2	6

Remark:country names are not given in the form they were used in the official documents of the IOC in 1980.

== Literature ==
- Гандбол [Handball] (in Russian). Moskau: ФИЗКУЛЬТУРА И СПОРТ. 1980. (Program magazine)
