= Makogonov =

Makogonov (masculine, Russian: Макогонов) or Makogonova (feminine, Russian: Макогонова) is a Russian surname. Notable people with the surname include:

- Irina Makogonova (born 1959), Russian volleyball player
- Vladimir Makogonov (1904–1993), Azerbaijani chess player
