= Peter Larisch =

German handball player (born 1950)

Peter Larisch (born 13 September 1950) is an East German former handball player who competed in the 1972 Summer Olympics.

He was born in Goldberg.

In 1972 he was part of the East German team which finished fourth in the Olympic tournament. He played one match and scored two goals.

He was the topscorer in the 1979-1980 DDR Oberliga with 140 goals.
