= Jens Wahl =

German former footballer (born 1966)

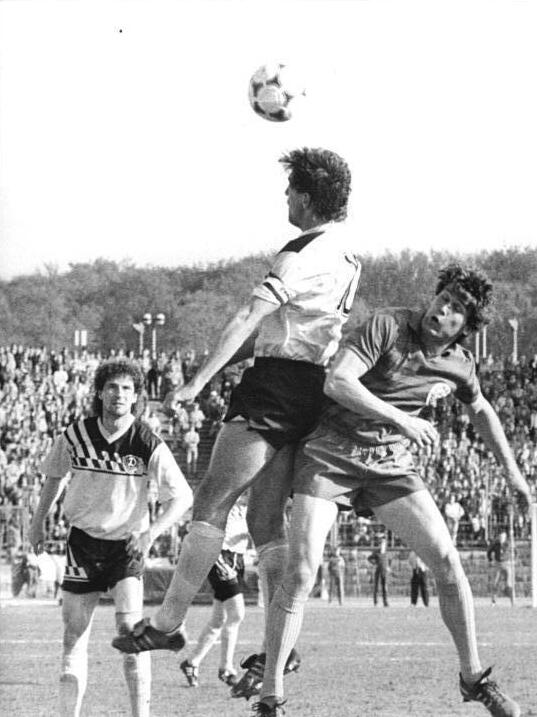
- Jens Wahl (right) challenges Dynamo Dresden's Ralf Minge, while Andreas Trautmann watches on

Personal information
- Date of birth: 24 July 1966 (age 60)
- Place of birth: East Germany
- Position: Left back

Youth career
- TSG BAU Rostock

Senior career*
Years	Team	Apps	(Gls)
–1985	TSG BAU Rostock	8	(1)
1985–1993	FC Hansa Rostock	187	(28)
1993–1996	Chemnitzer FC	100	(10)
1997	FC St. Gallen	0	(0)
1997–2000	Dynamo Dresden	54	(6)

International career
1989	East Germany	1	(0)
Medal record
Representing FC Hansa Rostock
Gold medal – first place	NOFV-Oberliga	1991
Gold medal – first place	NOFV Pokal	1991
- * Club domestic league appearances and goals

Jens Wahl (born 24 July 1966) is a German former footballer.

== Career ==
Wahl began his career with FC Hansa Rostock in the DDR-Oberliga, and won one cap for East Germany. After reunification, Hansa won the final, transitional East German championship, and the cup, with Wahl scoring the winner in the final. He later played for Chemnitzer FC, FC St. Gallen and Dynamo Dresden.

== Private ==
He is the cousin of German handball player Frank-Michael Wahl, who is the all time top scorer on the East Germany men's national handball team.
