= Ana Titlić =

Croatian handball player (born 1952)

Olympic medal record

Women's Handball
Silver medal – second place	1980 Moscow	Team

Ana Titlić (born 13 June 1952 in Gornja Vrba) is a former Yugoslav/Croatian handball player who competed in the 1980 Summer Olympics.

In 1980 she won the silver medal with the Yugoslav team. She played two matches.
