= Siegfried Voigt =

German handball player (born 1950)

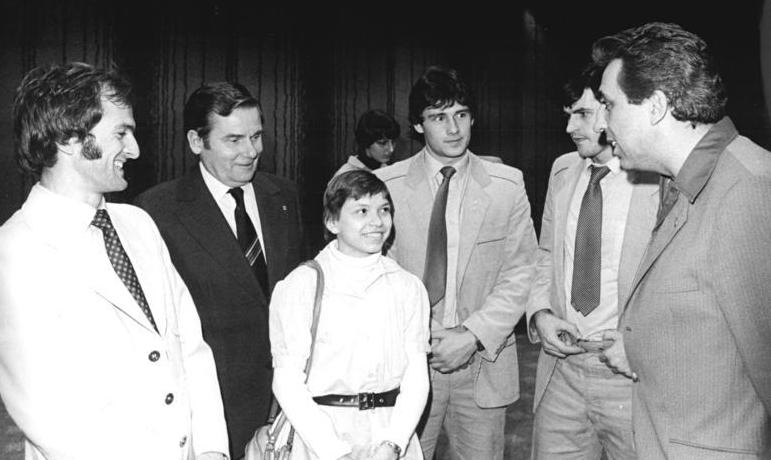
- Siegfried Voigt (2nd from right) in 1980.

Personal information
- Born: October 3, 1950 (age 76) Schneeberg, Saxony, East Germany

Sport
- Sport: Handball
- Position: goalkeeper

Senior clubs
- Years: Team
- –: BSG Wismut Aue
National team
- Years: Team
- –: East Germany
Medal record
Men's handball
Representing East Germany
Olympic Games
Gold medal – first place	1980 Moscow	Team
World Championship
Silver medal – second place	1974 East Germany
Bronze medal – third place	1978 Denmark

Siegfried Voigt (born 3 October 1950) is a former East German handball player who competed in the 1972 Summer Olympics and in the 1980 Summer Olympics.

In 1972 he was part of the East German team which finished fourth. He played two matches as goalkeeper.

Eight years later he was a member of the East German handball team which won the gold medal. He played all six matches as goalkeeper. For that he was awarded the DDR Patriotic Order of Merit in silver in 1980 and in gold in 1984.

For the East German national team he played at the 1974 World Championship, where East Germany came second, losing to Romania. At the 1978 World Championship, he came third with the East German team, beating Denmark in the third place playoff.

At club level he played for BSG Wismut Aue together with Dietmar Schmidt and Harry Zörnack.
