= Yuliya Bogdanova =

Russian swimmer

Personal information
- Born: April 27, 1964 (age 62) Leningrad, Soviet Union

Sport
- Sport: Swimming
Medal record
Representing the Soviet Union
Olympic Games
Bronze medal – third place	1980 Moscow	200 m breaststroke
World Championships (LC)
Gold medal – first place	1978 West Berlin	100m breaststroke
Silver medal – second place	1978 West Berlin	200m breaststroke
Bronze medal – third place	1978 West Berlin	4x100m medley relay
European Championships (LC)
Gold medal – first place	1977 Jönköping	100m breaststroke
Gold medal – first place	1977 Jönköping	200m breaststroke
Silver medal – second place	1977 Jönköping	4x100m medley relay

Yuliya Bogdanova (born 27 April 1964 in Leningrad) is a Russian former swimmer who competed in the 1980 Summer Olympics. she went on to win the bronze medal in the 200 metres breaststroke in the 1980 Summer Olympics and she a won gold medal of the 100 m breaststroke in the 1978 World Aquatics Championships.
