= Vesna Milošević =

Yugoslav handball player (born 1955)

Olympic medal record

Women's Handball
| Silver medal – second place | 1980 Moscow | Team |

Vesna Milošević (Macedonian Cyrillic: Весна Милошевиќ, born August 29, 1955, in Kičevo, Yugoslavia) is a former Yugoslav handball player who competed in the 1980 Summer Olympics.

In 1980 she won the silver medal with the Yugoslav team. She played all five matches as goalkeeper.
