= Annette Schultz =

East German volleyball player (born 1957)

Personal information
- Nationality: German
- Born: 1 September 1957 (age 69); Jena, Bezirk Gera, East Germany
Honours
Women's volleyball
Representing East Germany
Olympic Games
Silver medal – second place	1980 Moscow	Team

Annette Schultz (later Klatt, born 1 September 1957) is a German former volleyball player who competed for East Germany in the 1980 Summer Olympics.

Schultz was born in Jena.

In 1980, Schultz was part of the East German team that won the silver medal in the Olympic tournament. She played all five matches.
