= Klaus Gruner =

German handball player (born 1952)

Olympic medal record

Men's handball
| Gold medal – first place | 1980 Moscow | Team |

Klaus Gruner (born 22 August 1952 in Frankenhausen, Crimmitschau) is a former East German handball player who competed in the 1980 Summer Olympics.

He was a member of the East German handball team which won the gold medal. He played all six matches and scored three goals. He was the top scorer in the DDR Oberliga in the 1977–78 season with 139 goals.

He continues to coach a squad of youth in Hollenstedt, TuS Jahn Hollenstedt including his granddaughter Linnea Gruner.
