= Frank Kühne =

German swimmer

Personal information
- Born: 14 December 1961 (age 64) Leipzig, East Germany

Sport
- Sport: Swimming

Frank Kühne (born 14 December 1961) is a German swimmer. He competed in four events at the 1980 Summer Olympics for East Germany.
