= Peter Rost (handballer) =

German handball player (born 1951)

Personal information
- Nationality: German
- Born: 29 June 1951 (age 75) Leipzig, East Germany
- Height: 183 cm (72 in)

Sport
- Sport: Handball
- Position: Centre back

Youth career
- Years: Team
- 1959-?: BSG Leipzig Südwest
- –: SC Leipzig

Senior clubs
- Years: Team
- 1970-1984: SC Leipzig
National team
Years	Team	Apps	(Gls)
–	East Germany	216	(339)

Teams managed
- 1984-1989: SC Leipzig (youth)
- 1989-1993: SC Leipzig
- 1993-1998: Frankfurter Handball Club
- 1/1999-6/1999: SC Magdeburg
- 2001-2003: ThSV Eisenach
Medal record
Men's handball
Gold medal – first place	1980 Moscow	Team
World Championship
Silver medal – second place	1974 East Germany

Peter Rost (born 29 June 1951 in Leipzig, East Germany) is a former German Team handball player; today he works as a coach and an official in this sport. His biggest success was winning the Olympic gold medal as the captain of the national team of East Germany in Moscow in 1980.

Rost played for SC Leipzig nationally. In 1966 he won the DDR youth championship, and in 1972, 1976 and 1979 he won the East German Championship with the club. In 1984 he was named East German handballer of the year. All in all, he played internationally for East Germany 216 times, scoring 339 goals. He was in the team that came in second in the 1974 World Championship in their own country.

As a coach, he was responsible for the women's team from Frankfurt/Oder, the men's team of SC Magdeburg (1998/99) and of ThSV Eisenach (2001–2003). In 1999 he won the EHF European League with SC Magdeburg. In 2006 he joined the management of German handball club Concordia Delitzsch.

In 2019 he was included in the ThSV Eisenach hall of fame. In 1980 he was awarded the DDR Patriotic Order of Merit in silver and in 1984 in gold.

== Private ==
He is married to Christina Rost, who was an international player for East Germany's women's handball team, and who won a World Championship and Olympic silver and bronze medals in the 1970s. Their son Frank did not follow tradition; he played as a professional football goalkeeper for German Bundesliga team Hamburger SV.
