= Siegmar Gutzeit =

German fencer

Personal information
- Born: 25 March 1952 (age 74) Böhlen, East Germany

Sport
- Sport: Fencing

Siegmar Gutzeit (born 25 March 1952) is a German fencer. He competed in the team foil events for East Germany at the 1980 Summer Olympics.
