= Marion Tietz =

German handball player (born 1952)

Personal information
- Nationality: German
- Born: 17 November 1952 (age 73) Berlin, East Germany

Sport
- Sport: Handball

Senior clubs
- Years: Team
- –: Berliner TSC
National team
Years	Team	Apps	(Gls)
–	East Germany	188	(345)
Medal record
Olympic Games
Silver medal – second place	1976 Montreal	Team
Bronze medal – third place	1980 Moscow	Team
World Championship
Gold medal – first place	1975 Soviet Union
Gold medal – first place	1978 Czechoslovakia

Marion Tietz (born 17 November 1952) is a former East German handball player who won the World Championship in 1975 and 1978. She also competed in the 1976 Summer Olympics and in the 1980 Summer Olympics.

In 1976 she won the silver medal with the East German team. She played all five matches and scored fourteen goals.

Four years later she won the bronze medal as a member of the East German national team. She played all five matches and scored three goals.

In 1976 and 1979 she received the DDR Patriotic Order of Merit in bronze.

She played at club level for Berliner TSC.
