= Christina Rost =

German handball player (born 1952)

Medal record

Representing East Germany

Women's handball

Olympic Games
| Silver medal – second place | 1976 Montreal | Team |
| Bronze medal – third place | 1980 Moscow | Team |

IHF World Championship
| Gold medal – first place | 1975 Soviet Union | |

Christina Rost (née Mäbert, born 14 August 1952 in Chemnitz, East Germany) is a German former women's team handball player. She had her biggest success with the national team of East Germany, winning the 1975 World Championship in 1975, the Olympic silver medal in 1976 in Montreal and, four years later, the Olympic bronze medal in Moscow.

Rost played for SC Leipzig nationally, where she won 6 national championships and the EHF Champions Cup in 1973-74. She played 170 international matches for East Germany, scoring 161 goals.

In 1976 and 1979 she was awarded the DDR Patriotic Order of Merit in bronze and in 1984 in silver.

== Private ==
She is married to Peter Rost, another team handball player and Olympic gold medalist. Their son Frank did not follow in the tradition; he was a professional football goalkeeper for MLS team New York Red Bulls (2011).
