= Brigitte Fetzer =

German volleyball player (born 1956)

Personal information
- Full name: Brigitte Fetzer
- Nationality: German
- Born: 17 May 1956 (age 70); Erzgebirgskreis, East Germany
- Height: 196 cm (6 ft 5 in)
Honours
Women's volleyball
Representing East Germany
Olympic Games
Silver medal – second place	1980 Moscow	Team

Brigitte Fetzer (later Consuegra, born 17 May 1956) is a German former volleyball player who competed for East Germany in the 1980 Summer Olympics.

Fetzer was born in the district of Erzgebirgskreis.

In 1980, Fetzer was part of the East German team that won the silver medal in the Olympic tournament. She played all five matches.
