= Katharina Bullin =

German volleyball player (born 1959)

Personal information
- Nationality: German
- Born: 2 March 1959 (age 67); Stalinstadt, Bezirk Frankfurt, East Germany
Medal record
Women's volleyball
Representing East Germany
Olympic Games
Silver medal – second place	1980 Moscow	Team

Katharina Bullin (born 2 March 1959) is a German former volleyball player who competed for East Germany in the 1980 Summer Olympics.

She was born in Stalinstadt.

In 1980 she was part of the East German team which won the silver medal in the Olympic tournament. She played all five matches.
