= Hans-Georg Beyer =

German handball player (born 1956)

Olympic medal record

Men's handball
Gold medal – first place	1980 Moscow	Team

Hans-Georg Beyer (born 3 September 1956 in Stalinstadt (now Eisenhüttenstadt)) is a former East German handball player who competed in the 1980 Summer Olympics.

He was a member of the East German handball team which won the gold medal. He played five matches and scored fourteen goals.

He is the brother of Gisela Beyer and Udo Beyer.
