= Adrian Germanus =

German fencer

Personal information
- Born: 22 September 1955 (age 70) Hanover, West Germany

Sport
- Sport: Fencing

Adrian Germanus (born 22 September 1955) is a German fencer. He competed in the team foil events for East Germany at the 1980 and 1988 Summer Olympics.
