= Lothar Doering =

German handball player (born 1950)

Olympic medal record

Men's Handball

Olympics
Gold medal – first place	1980 Moscow	Team

Women's Handball

World Championship
Gold medal – first place	1993 Norway	Coach

Lothar Doering (born 23 October 1950 in Potsdam) is a former East German handball player who competed in the 1980 Summer Olympics.

He was a member of the East German handball team which won the gold medal. He played all six matches and scored twenty goals. He was the top scorer in the DDR-Oberliga Handball twice; in 1978-79 with 127 goals and in 1980-81 with 137 goals.

He was the coach of the Germany women's national team from 1992-1994 and again in 1999. In his first period he won the 1993 World Championship.
