= Martina Schmidt =

East German volleyball player (born 1960)

Personal information
- Full name: Martina Schmidt
- Nationality: German
- Born: 1 September 1960 (age 66); Parchim, East Germany
- Height: 174 cm (5 ft 9 in)
Honours
Women's volleyball
Representing East Germany
Olympic Games
Silver medal – second place	1980 Moscow	Team

Martina Schmidt (later Schwarz, born 1 September 1960) is a German former volleyball player who competed for East Germany in the 1980 Summer Olympics.

Schmidt was born in Parchim.

In 1980, Schmidt was part of the East German team that won the silver medal in the Olympic tournament. She played three matches.
