= Beate Schubert =

German fencer

Personal information
- Born: 14 October 1957 (age 68) Borna, East Germany

Sport
- Sport: Fencing

Beate Schubert (born 14 October 1957) is a German fencer. She competed in the women's team foil event for East Germany at the 1980 Summer Olympics.
