= Birgit Heinecke =

German handball player (born 1957)

Olympic medal record

Women's handball
Bronze medal – third place	1980 Moscow	Team

World Championship
Gold medal – first place	1978 Czechoslovakia	

Birgit Heinecke (née Richter, born 10 April 1957) is a former East German handball player who is a world champion from the 1978 World Championship. She also competed in the 1980 Summer Olympics.

In 1980 she won the bronze medal with the East German team. She played one match and scored three goals.

In total she played 57 games for the East German national team. In 1980 she was awarded the DDR Patriotic Order of Merit in silver.

At club level she played for SC Magdeburg.

== Post-playing career ==
After her playing days she work as a coach at the club. Later she worked for the Magdeburg based newspaper Volksstimme in the marketing department. From 2004 to 2009 she was the Marketing Manager at she newspaper Ostsee-Zeitung in Rostock. After wards she worked for Leipziger Volkszeitung.
