= Karin Püschel =

East German volleyball player (born 1958)

Personal information
- Nationality: German
- Born: 8 January 1958 (age 68); Merseburg, East Germany
Honours
Women's volleyball
Representing East Germany
Olympic Games
Silver medal – second place	1980 Moscow	Team

Karin Püschel (née Kahlow, born 8 January 1958) is a German former volleyball player who competed for East Germany in the 1980 Summer Olympics.

Püschel was born in Merseburg.

In 1980, Püschel was part of the East German team that won the silver medal in the Olympic tournament. She played three matches.
