= Werner Peter =

German footballer (born 1950)

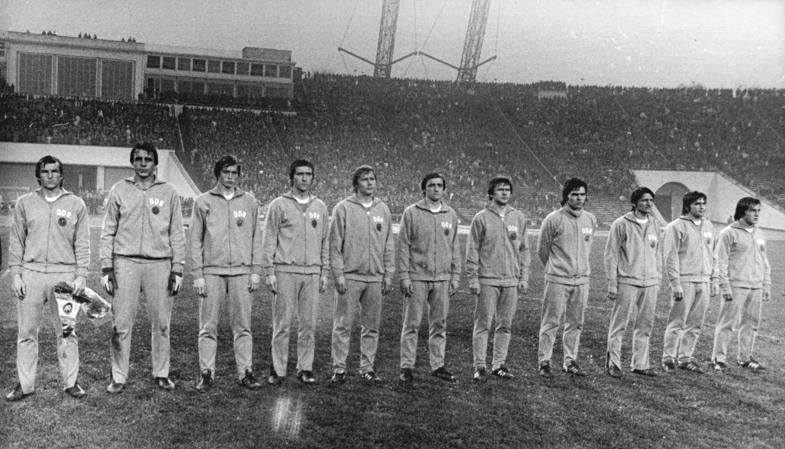
- Peter (third from right) with East Germany in 1978

Personal information
- Date of birth: 25 May 1950 (age 76)
- Place of birth: Sandersdorf, East Germany
- Height: 1.71 m (5 ft 7 in)
- Position: Forward

Senior career*
Years	Team	Apps	(Gls)
1970–1984	Hallescher FC	277	(85)

International career
1978–1979	East Germany	9	(1)
Medal record
Men's Football
Representing East Germany
Silver medal – second place	1980 Moscow	Team competition
- * Club domestic league appearances and goals

Werner Peter (born 25 May 1950) is a German former footballer who played as a forward. He won the silver medal with the East Germany national team at the 1980 Summer Olympics in Moscow, Soviet Union. He played 255 DDR-Oberliga matches (66 goals) for Hallescher FC Chemie. Peter obtained a total number of nine caps for his native country, scoring one goal.

== Career statistics ==
Scores and results list. East Germany's goal tally first.

#	Date	Venue	Opponent	Score	Result	Competition
1.	4 October 1978	Kurt-Wabbel Stadion, Halle	Iceland	1–0	3–1	UEFA Euro 1980 qualifying
