= Hans-Georg Jaunich =

German handball player (born 1951)

Olympic medal record

Men's handball
Gold medal – first place	1980 Moscow	Team

Hans-Georg Jaunich (born 18 October 1951 in Schwaan) is a former East German handball player who competed in the 1980 Summer Olympics.

He was a member of the East German handball team which won the gold medal. He played three matches and scored one goal.
