= Rainer Höft =

German handball player (born 1956)

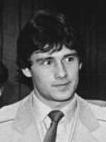

Medal record

Representing East Germany

Men's handball
Gold medal – first place	1980 Moscow	Team

World Championship
Bronze medal – third place	1978 Denmark	

Rainer Höft (born 3 April 1956 in Berlin) is a former East German handball player who competed in the 1980 Summer Olympics.

He was a member of the East German handball team which won the gold medal. He played five matches and scored four goals.

In 1980 he received the DDR Patriotic Order of Merit in silver.

At club level he played for SC Dynamo Berlin.
