= Renate Rudolph =

East German handball player (born 1949)

Olympic medal record

Women's handball
Bronze medal – third place	1980 Moscow	Team

IHF World Championship
Gold medal – first place	1978 Czechoslovakia	

Renate Rudolph (born 24 November 1949 in Leipzig, East Germany) is a former East German handball player who won the 1978 World Championship. She played as a goalkeeper. She also won bronze medals at the 1980 Summer Olympics.

In 1980, she won the bronze medal with the East German team.
