= Gerd May =

German fencer (born 1953)

Personal information
- Born: 3 June 1953 (age 73) Rostock, East Germany

Sport
- Sport: Fencing

Gerd May (born 3 June 1953) is a German fencer. He competed in the team sabre event for East Germany at the 1980 Summer Olympics.
