= Silvia Rinka =

East German swimmer

Personal information
- Born: July 27, 1962 (age 63)

Sport
- Sport: Swimming
- Strokes: Breaststroke

Silvia Rinka (later Madeja, born 27 July 1962) is an East German swimmer who competed in the late 1970s and early 1980s. Competing in the breaststroke, she finished eighth in the 200 m breaststroke event at the 1980 Summer Olympics in Moscow.

Rinka is married to Uwe Madeja, who won the silver medal in the canoeing C-2 1000 m event at those same games.
