= Christine Mummhardt =

East German volleyball player

Personal information
- Nationality: German
- Born: 27 December 1951 (age 74); Dresden, East Germany (now Germany)
Honours
Women's volleyball
Representing East Germany
Olympic Games
Silver medal – second place	1980 Moscow	Team

Christine Mummhardt (née Walther, born 27 December 1951) is a German former volleyball player who competed for East Germany in the 1976 Summer Olympics and in the 1980 Summer Olympics.

Mummhardt was born in Dresden in 1951.

In 1976, Mummhardt was part of the East German team that finished sixth in the Olympic tournament. She played all five matches. Four years later, she won a silver medal with the East German team in the 1980 Olympic tournament. She played three matches.

She studied state sciences and was employed first at Volkspolizei (German People's Police) followed by Bundesagentur für Arbeit (Federal Employment Agency).
