= Hendrik Jung =

German fencer

Personal information
- Born: 18 September 1956 (age 69) Leipzig, East Germany

Sport
- Sport: Fencing

Hendrik Jung (born 18 September 1956) is a German fencer. He competed in the team sabre event for East Germany at the 1980 Summer Olympics.
