= Ute Kostrzewa =

East German volleyball player (born 1961)

Personal information
- Nationality: German
- Born: 27 December 1961 (age 64) Eilenburg, Bezirk Leipzig, East Germany
Honours
Women's volleyball
Representing East Germany
Olympic Games
Silver medal – second place	1980 Moscow	Team

Ute Kostrzewa (later Meyer, born 27 December 1961) is a German former volleyball player who competed for East Germany in the 1980 Summer Olympics.

Kostrzewa was born in Eilenburg.

In 1980, Kostrzewa was part of the East German team that won the silver medal in the Olympic tournament. She played four matches.
