= Claudia Wunderlich =

East German handball player (born 1956)

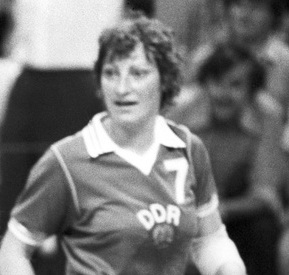
- Claudia Wunderlich (1980)

Personal information
- Nationality: German
- Born: 16 February 1956 (age 70) Halberstadt, East Germany
- Height: 170 cm (67 in)

Sport
- Sport: Handball

Senior clubs
- Years: Team
- –: SC Magdeburg
National team
- Years: Team
- –: East Germany
Medal record
Women's handball
| Bronze medal – third place | 1980 Moscow | Team |
World Championship
| Gold medal – first place | 1978 Czechoslovakia |

Claudia Wunderlich (born 16 February 1956) is a former East German handball player who is a world champion from the 1978 World Championship. She also competed in the 1980 Summer Olympics.

In 1980 she won the bronze medal with the East German team. She played four matches and scored four goals.

In 1979 she was awarded the DDR Patriotic Order of Merit in bronze and in 1984 in silver.

At club level she played for SC Magdeburg.
