= Ingolf Wiegert =

German handball player (born 1957)

Olympic medal record

Men's handball
Gold medal – first place	1980 Moscow	Team

Ingolf Wiegert (born 3 November 1957) is a former East German handball player who competed in the 1980 Summer Olympics.

He was a member of the East German handball team which won the gold medal. He played all six matches and scored ten goals.

At club level he played for TuS Fortschritt Magdeburg and SC Magdeburg. With the latter he won the European Cup in 1978 and 1981. In 1983 he was named handballer of the year in the DDR.

== Private ==
His son, Bennet Wiegert, is also a handball player.
