= Evelyn Matz =

German handball player (born 1955)

Olympic medal record

Women's handball
Silver medal – second place	1976 Montreal	Team
Bronze medal – third place	1980 Moscow	Team

World Championship
Gold medal – first place	1975 Soviet Union	
Gold medal – first place	1978 Czechoslovakia	

Evelyn Matz (later for some time Hübscher, born 22 November 1955 in Berlin) is a former East German handball player who is a world champion from 1975 and 1978. She also competed in the 1976 Summer Olympics and in the 1980 Summer Olympics, winning silver and bronze medals respectively.

In 1976 she won the silver medal with the East German team. She played all five matches and scored five goals.

Four years later she won the bronze medal as a member of the East German. She played all five matches and scored fifteen goals.

In total she played 270 national team games for the East German team.

At club level she played for Berliner TSC, where she won the 1978 EHF Champions Cup and the 1977 and 1979 EHF Cup Winners' Cup. In 1985 and 1987 she was named Handballer of the Year in East Germany.

In 1984 she was awarded the DDR Patriotic Order of Merit in silver.
