= Hartmut Krüger =

German handball player (born 1953)

Medal record

Men's handball

Representing East Germany

Olympic Games
Gold medal – first place	1980 Moscow	Team

Hartmut Krüger (born 8 May 1953 in Güsen, Elbe-Parey) is a former East German handball player who competed in the 1980 Summer Olympics.

He was a member of the East German handball team which won the gold medal. He played all six matches and scored 22 goals.
