= Bettina Löbel =

German swimmer

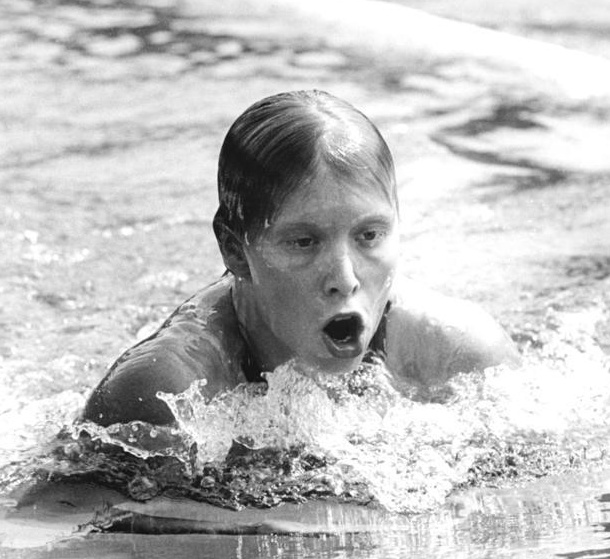
- Bettina Löbel in 1979

Personal information
- Born: 29 November 1962 (age 63) Dresden, East Germany
- Height: 1.66 m (5 ft 5 in)
- Weight: 56 kg (123 lb)

Sport
- Sport: Swimming
- Club: SC Einheit Dresden

Bettina Löbel (born 29 November 1962) is a retired German swimmer who competed for East Germany.

Löbel competed at the 1980 Summer Olympics in the 100 m and 200 m breaststroke and finished in seventh place in the latter event. In 1979–1980, she won three national titles in the 200 m breaststroke and 4 × 100 m medley.
