= Dietmar Schmidt =

German handball player and coach (born 1952)

Personal information
- Nationality: German
- Born: 29 April 1952 (age 74) Zwickau, East Germany
- Height: 181 cm (71 in)

Sport
- Sport: Handball
- Position: Pivot
- Current club: BSV Sachsen Zwickau

Senior clubs
- Years: Team
- –: BSG Aktivist „Karl Marx“ Zwickau
- –: BSG Wismut Aue
- –: ASK Vorwärts Frankfurt
National team
| Years | Team | Apps | (Gls) |
| – | East Germany | 242 | (340) |

Teams managed
- 1985-1989: East Germany women (assistent)
- 1985-1988: ASK Vorwärts Frankfurt (Women, assistant)
- 1988-1990: ASK Vorwärts Frankfurt (Men)
- –: Zwickauer HC Grubenlampe
- 1999-2002: EHV Aue
- 2002-2004: HC Plauen
- 2004-2006: HSV Glauchau
- 2006-2017: Frankfurter HC
- 2019-2020: Frankfurter HC
- 2020-: BSV Sachsen Zwickau (assistant)
Medal record
Representing East Germany
Olympic Games
| Gold medal – first place | 1980 Moscow | Team |
World Championship
| Silver medal – second place | 1974 East Germany |
| Bronze medal – third place | 1978 Denmark |

Dietmar Schmidt (born 29 April 1952 in Zwickau) is a handball coach who is currently the assistant coach at the women's team BSV Sachsen Zwickau. He is also a former East German handball player who won gold medals in the 1980 Summer Olympics as the captain.

== Playing career ==
Schmidt started his sports career with swimming and fistball. In 1967 he won the DDR Youth championship in first ball. He started playing handball in school and then joined BSG Aktivist „Karl Marx“ Zwickau and BSG Wismut Aue. In the DDR-Oberliga he played for ASK Vorwärts Frankfurt, where he won the DDR championship twice in 1974 and 1975. In 1975 he also won the EHF Champions League.

For the East German national team he played at the 1974 World Championship, where East Germany came second, losing to Romania. At the 1978 World Championship, he came third with the East German team, beating Denmark in the third place playoff.

At the 1980 Olympics He was the captain of the East German handball team which won the gold medal. He played all six matches and scored two goals. For that he was awarded the DDR Patriotic Order of Merit in silver in 1980 and in gold in 1984. He retired in 1984.

== Coaching career ==
In 1985 he became the assistant at the East Germany women's team, where he was until 1989. At the same time he was the assistant coach of the women's team of his former team, ASK Vorwärts Frankfurt. In 1988 he became the head coach of ASK Vorwärts Frankfurt's first men's team. In 1989 he won the East German Championship with the club.

Later he was the head coach of Zwickauer HC Grubenlampe, EHV Aue (1999–2002), HC Plauen (2002–2004) and HSV Glauchau (2004–2006).

From july 2006 he became the head coach at Frankfurter HC. He coached the team through the 2013 bankruptcy and exit from the Bundesliga and continued in the 3. Liga. He ceased in this position in 2017. He returned to the club in October 2019. From the 2020-21 season he became the assistant at the women's team at BSV Sachsen Zwickau, the club that his own former team BSG Aktivist „Karl Marx“ Zwickau had turned into after the German reunification. They played in the second Bundesliga at the time and was promoted to the Bundesliga the following season.
