= Günter Dreibrodt =

German handball player (born 1951)

Olympic medal record

Men's handball
Gold medal – first place	1980 Moscow	Team

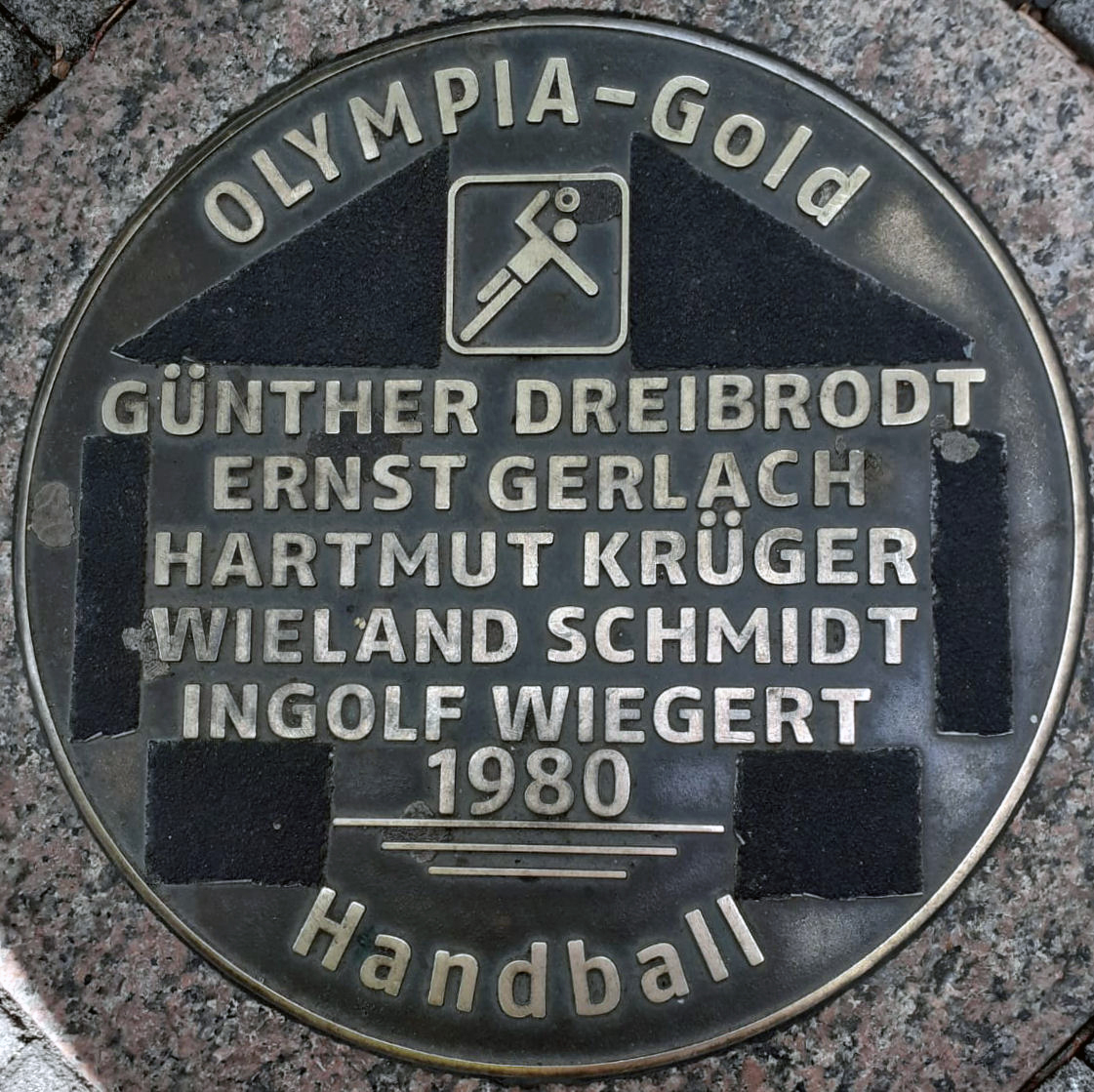
Sports Walk of Fame in Magdeburg

Günter Dreibrodt (born 26 July 1951 in Roßlau) is a former East German handball player who competed in the 1980 Summer Olympics. He played as a back.

He was a member of the East German handball team which won the gold medal. He played all six matches and scored thirteen goals.

He also played at the 1978 World Championship, where he finished 3rd with the German team.

With SC Magdeburg he won the East German Championship seven times. In the 1976-77 season he was the top scorer in the Oberliga. Additionally he won the 1978 and 1981 EHF Champions League.
