= Wieland Schmidt =

German handball player (born 1953)

Olympic medal record

Men's handball
Gold medal – first place	1980 Moscow	Team

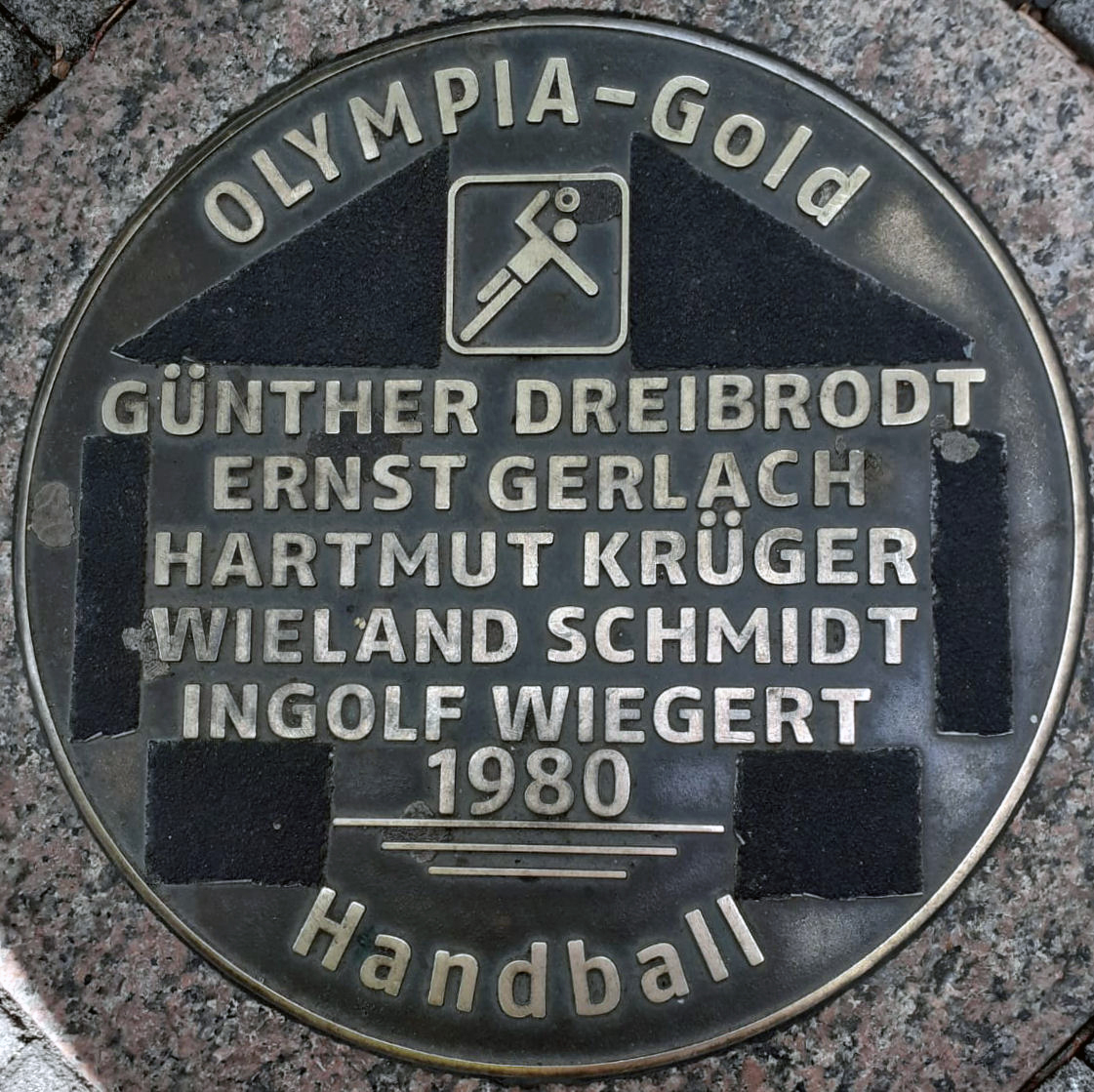
Sports Walk of Fame, Magdeburg

Wieland Schmidt (born 23 December 1953 in Magdeburg-Ottersleben) is a former East German handball player who competed in the 1980 Summer Olympics and in the 1988 Summer Olympics.

He was a member of the East German handball team which won the gold medal. He played all six matches as goalkeeper.

Eight years later he was part of the East German team which finished seventh. He played all six matches as goalkeeper again.
