= Kornelia Kunisch =

German handball player (born 1959)

Personal information
- Nationality: German
- Born: October 17, 1959 (age 67) Lübben, East Germany
- Height: 172 cm (68 in)

Sport
- Sport: Handball

Youth career
- Years: Team
- –: TSG Calbe
- 1973-1975: SC Magdeburg

Senior clubs
- Years: Team
- 1975-1990: SC Magdeburg
- 1990-1997: TuS Eintracht Minden
- 1997-2001: VT Bückeburg
- 2001-?: Eintracht Oberlübbe
National team
Years	Team	Apps	(Gls)
–	East Germany	200	(675)

Teams managed
- 1996: TuS Eintracht Minden (player-coach)
- 1997-1998: TuS Eintracht Minden
- 1998-2003: GWD Minden (youth coach)
Medal record
Women's handball
Bronze medal – third place	1980 Moscow	Team
IHF World Championship
Gold medal – first place	1978 Czechoslovakia

Kornelia Kunisch (née Elbe, born 17 October 1959 in Lübben, East Germany) is a former East German handball player who won the 1978 World Championship. She also competed in the 1980 Summer Olympics, where she won bronze medals.

== Career ==
Kunisch started playing handball at TSG Calbe before joining SC Magdeburg in 1973. In 1981 she won the DDR-Championship with the club. In 1983 she was named Handballer of the Year in DDR. In the 1980 and 1989 seasons she was the top scorer in the DDR-Oberliga.

After the fall of the Berlin Wall she joined TuS Eintracht Minden. In 1997 she stopped as a top player and joined VT Bückeburg in the Regionalliga. In 2001 she was promoted to the 2nd Bundesliga with the team.

In 1984 she was awarded the DDR Patriotic Order of Merit in silver.

== Post-playing career ==
Kunisch is educated as a physiotherapist. She has coached various youth teams at GWD Minden.

== Private ==
Her son, Christopher, is also a handball player for GWD Minden.
