= Katrin Krüger =

German handball player (born 1959)

Olympic medal record

Women's handball
Bronze medal – third place	1980 Moscow	Team

World Championship
Gold medal – first place	1978 Czechoslovakia	

Katrin Krüger (later Mietzner, born 10 April 1959 in Groß Schönebeck, Bezirk Frankfurt) is a former East German handball player who is a world champion from the 1978 World Women's Handball Championship. She also competed in the 1980 Summer Olympics. She holds the record for most goals scored for the East Germany women's national handball team with 1095 goals.

In 1980 she won the bronze medal with the East German team. She played all five matches and scored eleven goals.

At club level she played for ASK Vorwärts Frankfurt/Oder. In the 1978, 1979, 1980, 1981 and 1983 seasons she was the top scorer in the DDR-Oberliga.

== Acknowledgements ==
In 1981 and 1982 she was named Handballer of the year in East Germany. In 1979 she was awarded the DDR Patriotic Order of Merit in bronze and in 1984 in silver.

== Private ==
She is married to the former rowing European champion Jochen Mietzner and works as a judge at the Amtsgericht. Her daughter Franziska Mietzner is also a handball player.
