= Frank-Michael Wahl =

German handball player (born 1956)

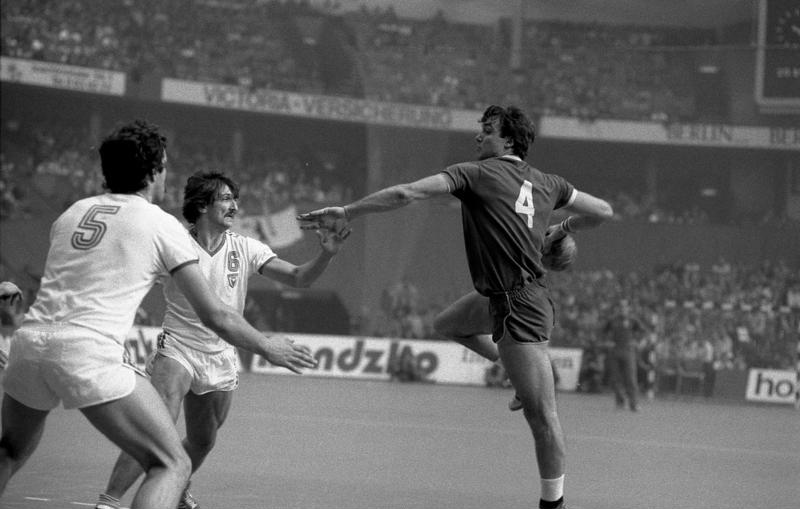
- Frank-Michael Wahl (right) in 1983

Personal information
- Full name: Frank-Michael Wahl
- Nationality: Germany
- Born: 24 August 1956 (age 70) Rostock, DDR
- Height: 1.90 m (6 ft 3 in)

Sport
- Sport: Handball
- Position: Left back

Senior clubs
- Years: Team
- 1973–1990: SC Empor Rostock
- 1990-1993: SG VfL/BHW Hameln
- 1993-: TSG Altenhagen-Heepen
- –: TSG Emmerthal
National team
Years	Team	Apps	(Gls)
–	DDR	313	(1338)
–	Germany	31	(74)

Teams managed
- 1999–2000: SG VfL/BHW Hameln
- 2001–2004: VfL Hessisch Oldendorf
- 2004-2005: HSG Gütersloh
- 2006-2007: HF Springe
- 2008: HSG Exten-Rinteln
- 2008-2009: TV 87 Stadtoldendorf
- 2016-: HSG Fuhlen/Hessisch Oldendorf
Medal record
Men's handball
Gold medal – first place	1980 Moscow	Team

Frank-Michael Wahl (born 24 August 1956 in Rostock) is a former German handball player and coach. During his playing career he played for both the DDR and German national team. He has the record for both most appearances and most goals for any German national team. With DDR competed in the 1980 Summer Olympics and the 1988 Summer Olympics, and with a unified Germany in the 1992 Summer Olympics.

In 1980 he was a member of the East German handball team which won the gold medal. He played all six matches and scored 33 goals. Eight years later he was part of the East German team which finished seventh. He played all six matches and scored 24 goals. In 1992 he competed with the German team and finished tenth. He played five matches and scored four goals.

== Club handball ==
Before the fall of the Berlin Wall he played for SC Empor Rostock in the DDR-Oberliga, where he won 3 East German championships and the FDGB-Pokal once. He also won the EHF Cup with Rostock in 1982. He was four times the topscorer in the Oberliga (in 81/82, 82/83, 84/85 and in 85/86) and he was three times awarded the player of the year award.

After the fall of the Berlin Wall he joined second league team SG VfL/BHW Hameln. A year after he was promoted with the team to the Handball-Bundesliga. In his last match for the German national team he was named honorary captain.

Later he came back to handball and played for the 2nd tier team TSG Altenhagen-Heepen, as well as the lower league TSG Emmerthal.

== Post-playing career ==
After his playing career he went on to coach several German teams.

== Private ==
He is the cousin of footballer Jens Wahl.

== See also ==
- List of men's handballers with 1000 or more international goals
