= DDR-Oberliga Handball =

Disestablished handball league in East Germany

The Handball-Oberliga der DDR was the top handball division in East Germany. It existed from 1964 to 1991 with the 1990-1991 season being the last one before the German re-unification.

Prior to 1964 the East German Championship was decided in a tournament format.

== Champions ==
- 1991 SC Magdeburg
- 1990 1. SC Berlin
- 1989 ASK Vorwärts Frankfurt/Oder
- 1988 SC Magdeburg
- 1987 SC Empor Rostock
- 1986 SC Empor Rostock
- 1985 SC Magdeburg
- 1984 SC Magdeburg
- 1983 SC Magdeburg
- 1982 SC Magdeburg
- 1981 SC Magdeburg
- 1980 SC Magdeburg
- 1979 SC Leipzig
- 1978 SC Empor Rostock
- 1977 SC Magdeburg
- 1976 SC Leipzig
- 1975 ASK Vorwärts Frankfurt/Oder
- 1974 ASK Vorwärts Frankfurt/Oder
- 1973 SC Empor Rostock
- 1972 SC Leipzig
- 1971 SC Dynamo Berlin
- 1970 SC Magdeburg
- 1969 SC Dynamo Berlin
- 1968 SC Empor Rostock
- 1967 SC Dynamo Berlin
- 1966 SC DHfK Leipzig
- 1965 SC DHfK Leipzig
- 1964 ASK Vorwärts Berlin

== Top scorers ==
Season	Player	Club	Goals
1964/65	Uwe Spindler	BSG Lokomotive Dresden	96
1965/66	Rainer Zimmermann	SC Dynamo Berlin	114
1966/67	Reiner Ganschow	SC Empor Rostock	98
1967/68	Reiner Ganschow	SC Empor Rostock	129
1968/69	Karl-Heinz Rost	SC Leipzig	106
1969/70	Günter Schüler	BSG ZAB Dessau	129
1970/71	Heinz Flacke	SC Magdeburg	137
1971/72	Heinz Flacke	SC Magdeburg	154
1972/73	Heinz Flacke	SC Magdeburg	144
1973/74	Heinz Flacke	SC Magdeburg	185
1974/75	Axel Kählert	SC DHfK Leipzig	210
1975/76	Axel Kählert	SC Leipzig	187
1976/77	Günter Dreibrodt	SC Magdeburg	204
1977/78	Klaus Gruner	ASK Vorwärts Frankfurt	139
1978/79	Lothar Doering	SC Leipzig	127
1979/80	Peter Larisch	BSG Post Schwerin	140
1980/81	Lothar Doering	SC Leipzig	137
1981/82	Frank-Michael Wahl	SC Empor Rostock	134
1982/83	Frank-Michael Wahl	SC Empor Rostock	161
1983/84	Axel Vollgold	SC Leipzig	135
1984/85	Frank-Michael Wahl	SC Empor Rostock	148
1985/86	Frank-Michael Wahl	SC Empor Rostock	147
1986/87	Jürgen Flau	BSG Post Schwerin	135
1987/88	Georg Rothenburger	BSG Wismut Aue	148
1988/89	Rüdiger Borchardt	SC Empor Rostock	141
1989/90	Rüdiger Borchardt	SC Empor Rostock	149
1990/91	Karsten Kalbitz; Uwe Seidel	ThSV Eisenach; BFV Frankfurt	150

== See also ==
- DDR-Oberliga (women's handball)
