= Soviet Union at the 1980 Summer Olympics =

- Flag of the Soviet Union
- IOC code: URS
- NOC: Soviet Olympic Committee

in Moscow, Russian SFSR, Soviet Union
- Competitors: 489 (340 men and 149 women) in 23 sports
- Flag bearer: Nikolay Balboshin
- Medals Ranked 1st: Gold 80 Silver 69 Bronze 46 Total 195

Summer Olympics appearances (overview)
- 1952; 1956; 1960; 1964; 1968; 1972; 1976; 1980; 1984; 1988

Other related appearances
- Russian Empire (1900–1912); Estonia (1920–1936, 1992–pres.); Latvia (1924–1936, 1992–pres.); Lithuania (1924–1928, 1992–pres.); Unified Team (1992); Armenia (1994–pres.); Belarus (1994–2020); Georgia (1994–pres.); Kazakhstan (1994–pres.); Kyrgyzstan (1994–pres.); Moldova (1994–pres.); Russia (1994–2016); Ukraine (1994–pres.); Uzbekistan (1994–pres.); Azerbaijan (1996–pres.); Tajikistan (1996–pres.); Turkmenistan (1996–pres.); ROC (2020); Individual Neutral Athletes (2024)

The Soviet Union (USSR) was the host nation of the 1980 Summer Olympics in Moscow. 489 competitors, 340 men and 149 women, took part in 202 events in 23 sports.

The Soviet Union won a record 80 gold medals (although since surpassed by the United States), and their 195 total medals are the second best result in history.

== Medalists ==
The USSR finished first in the final medal rankings, with 80 gold and 195 total medals.

Medal	Name	Sport	Event	Date
Gold	Yury Kashirin; Oleg Logvin; Sergey Shelpakov; Anatoly Yarkin	Cycling	Men's team time trial	20 July
Gold	Alexander Melentyev	Shooting	Mixed 50 metre pistol	20 July
Gold	Sergey Fesenko	Swimming	Men's 200 metre butterfly	20 July
Gold	Kanybek Osmonaliyev	Weightlifting	Men's 52 kg	20 July
Gold	Irina Kalinina	Diving	Women's 3 metre springboard	21 July
Gold	Sergey Koplyakov	Swimming	Men's 200 metre freestyle	21 July
Gold	Vladimir Salnikov	Swimming	Men's 1500 metre freestyle	22 July
Gold	Viktor Mazin	Weightlifting	Men's 60 kg	22 July
Gold	Zhaksylyk Ushkempirov	Wrestling	Men's Greco-Roman 48 kg	22 July
Gold	Aleksandr Portnov	Diving	Men's 3 metre springboard	23 July
Gold	Vladimir Smirnov	Fencing	Men's foil	23 July
Gold	Yelena Davydova; Maria Filatova; Nellie Kim; Yelena Naimushina; Natalia Shaposhnikova; Stella Zakharova	Gymnastics	Women's artistic team all-around	23 July
Gold	Sergey Koplyakov; Serhiy Krasyuk; Andrey Krylov; Yuri Presekin; Sergey Rusin; Vladimir Salnikov; Ivar Stukolkin	Swimming	Men's 4 × 200 metre freestyle relay	23 July
Gold	Lina Kačiušytė	Swimming	Women's 200 metre breaststroke	23 July
Gold	Vakhtang Blagidze	Wrestling	Men's Greco-Roman 52 kg	23 July
Gold	Nikolai Andrianov; Eduard Azaryan; Alexander Dityatin; Bohdan Makuts; Vladimir Markelov; Aleksandr Tkachyov	Gymnastics	Men's artistic team all-around	24 July
Gold	Viktor Vlasov	Shooting	Mixed 50 metre rifle three positions	24 July
Gold	Igor Sokolov	Shooting	Mixed 50 metre running target	24 July
Gold	Jaak Uudmäe	Athletics	Men's triple jump	24 July
Gold	Nadiya Tkachenko	Athletics	Women's pentathlon	24 July
Gold	Alexander Dityatin	Gymnastics	Men's artistic individual all-around	24 July
Gold	Yelena Davydova	Gymnastics	Women's artistic individual all-around	24 July
Gold	Anatoli Starostin	Modern pentathlon	Men's individual	24 July
Gold	Pavel Lednyov; Yevgeny Lipeyev; Anatoli Starostin	Modern pentathlon	Men's team	24 July
Gold	Vladimir Salnikov	Swimming	Men's 400 metre freestyle	24 July
Gold	Shamil Serikov	Wrestling	Men's Greco-Roman 57 kg	24 July
Gold	Gennady Korban	Wrestling	Men's Greco-Roman 82 kg	24 July
Gold	Aleksandr Kolchinsky	Wrestling	Men's Greco-Roman +100 kg	24 July
Gold	Viktor Krovopuskov	Fencing	Men's sabre	25 July
Gold	Aleksandr Tkachyov	Gymnastics	Men's parallel bars	25 July
Gold	Alexander Dityatin	Gymnastics	Men's rings	25 July
Gold	Nikolai Andrianov	Gymnastics	Men's vault	25 July
Gold	Nellie Kim	Gymnastics	Women's floor	25 July
Gold	Natalia Shaposhnikova	Gymnastics	Women's vault	25 July
Gold	Lyudmila Kondratyeva	Athletics	Women's 100 metres	26 July
Gold	Aleksandr Krasnov; Viktor Manakov; Valery Movchan; Vitaly Petrakov	Cycling	Men's team pursuit	26 July
Gold	Yelena Khloptseva; Larisa Popova	Rowing	Women's double sculls	26 July
Gold	Robertas Žulpa	Swimming	Men's 200 metre breaststroke	26 July
Gold	Yurik Vardanyan	Weightlifting	Men's 82.5 kg	26 July
Gold	Dainis Kūla	Athletics	Men's javelin throw	27 July
Gold	Nadezhda Olizarenko	Athletics	Women's 800 metres	27 July
Gold	Aleksandr Blinov; Yuri Salnikov; Valery Volkov; Sergey Rogozhin	Equestrian	Team eventing	27 July
Gold	Oleksandr Sydorenko	Swimming	Men's 400 metre individual medley	27 July
Gold	Viktor Rashchupkin	Athletics	Men's discus throw	28 July
Gold	Vera Komisova	Athletics	Women's 100 metres hurdles	28 July
Gold	Sergei Sukhoruchenkov	Cycling	Men's individual road race	28 July
Gold	Viktor Asmaev; Vyacheslav Chukanov; Nikolai Korolkov; Viktor Poganovsky	Equestrian	Team jumping	29 July
Gold	Mikhail Burtsev; Viktor Krovopuskov; Vladimir Nazlymov; Viktor Sidyak; Nikolay Alyokhin	Fencing	Men's team sabre	29 July
Gold	Shota Khabareli	Judo	Men's 78 kg	29 July
Gold	Valentin Mankin; Aleksandr Muzychenko	Sailing	Star	29 July
Gold	Soviet Union women's national volleyball team: Yelena Akhaminova; Yelena Andreyuk; Svetlana Badulina; Lyudmila Chernyshyova; Lyubov Kozyreva; Lidiya Loginova; Irina Makogonova; Svetlana Nikishina; Larisa Pavlova; Nadezhda Radzevich; Nataliya Razumova; Olga Solovova	Volleyball	Women's tournament	29 July
Gold	Soviet Union men's national water polo team: Vladimir Akimov; Aleksei Barkalov; Yevgeny Grishin; Mikhail Ivanov; Aleksandr Kabanov; Sergey Kotenko; Giorgi Mshvenieradze; Mait Riisman; Viacheslav Sobchenko; Yevgeny Sharonov; Erkin Shagaev	Water polo	Men's tournament	29 July
Gold	Leonid Taranenko	Weightlifting	Men's 110 kg	29 July
Gold	Magomedgasan Abushev	Wrestling	Men's freestyle 62 kg	29 July
Gold	Sanasar Oganisyan	Wrestling	Men's freestyle 90 kg	29 July
Gold	Soviet Union women's national handball team: Larysa Karlova; Tetyana Kocherhina; Valentyna Lutayeva; Aldona Nenėnienė; Lyubov Odynokova; Iryna Palchykova; Lyudmila Poradnyk; Yuliya Safina; Larisa Savkina; Sigita Strečen; Nataliya Tymoshkina; Zinaida Turchyna; Olha Zubaryeva; Natalya Lukyanenko	Handball	Women's tournament	30 July
Gold	Viktor Markin	Athletics	Men's 400 metres	30 July
Gold	Vladimir Kiselyov	Athletics	Men's shot put	30 July
Gold	Soviet Union women's national basketball team: Olga Barysheva; Vida Beselienė; Nelli Feryabnikova; Tatyana Ivinskaya; Tetiana Nadyrova; Lyudmila Rogozhina; Angelė Rupšienė; Uljana Semjonova; Lyubov Sharmay; Nadezhda Shuvayeva-Olkhova; Olga Sukharnova; Tatyana Ovechkina	Basketball	Women's tournament	30 July
Gold	Sultan Rakhmanov	Weightlifting	Men's +110 kg	30 July
Gold	Anatoly Beloglazov	Wrestling	Men's freestyle 52 kg	30 July
Gold	Ilya Mate	Wrestling	Men's freestyle 100 kg	30 July
Gold	Yuriy Sedykh	Athletics	Men's hammer throw	31 July
Gold	Tatyana Kolpakova	Athletics	Women's long jump	31 July
Gold	Yuri Kovshov; Vira Misevych; Viktor Ugryumov	Equestrian	Team dressage	31 July
Gold	Nikolay Solodukhin	Judo	Men's 65 kg	31 July
Gold	Sergei Beloglazov	Wrestling	Men's freestyle 57 kg	31 July
Gold	Saypulla Absaidov	Wrestling	Men's freestyle 68 kg	31 July
Gold	Soslan Andiyev	Wrestling	Men's freestyle +100 kg	31 July
Gold	Aleksandr Aksinin; Vladimir Muravyov; Andrey Prokofyev; Nikolay Sidorov	Athletics	Men's 4 × 100 metres relay	1 August
Gold	Viktor Burakov; Nikolay Chernetskiy; Mikhail Linge; Viktor Markin; Remigijus Valiulis	Athletics	Men's 4 × 400 metres relay	1 August
Gold	Tatyana Kazankina	Athletics	Women's 1500 metres	1 August
Gold	Tatyana Goyshchik; Irina Nazarova; Tatyana Prorochenko; Nina Zyuskova	Athletics	Women's 4 × 400 metres relay	1 August
Gold	Sergei Postrekhin	Canoeing	Men's C-1 500 metres	1 August
Gold	Vladimir Parfenovich	Canoeing	Men's K-1 500 metres	1 August
Gold	Sergei Chukhray; Vladimir Parfenovich	Canoeing	Men's K-2 500 metres	1 August
Gold	Soviet Union men's national volleyball team: Vladimir Chernyshyov; Vladimir Dorokhov; Aleksandr Ermilov; Vladimir Kondra; Valeriy Kryvov; Fedir Lashchonov; Viljar Loor; Oleg Moliboga; Yury Panchenko; Aleksandr Savin; Pāvels Seļivanovs; Vyacheslav Zaytsev	Volleyball	Men's tournament	1 August
Gold	Keto Losaberidze	Archery	Women's individual	2 August
Gold	Shamil Sabirov	Boxing	Light flyweight	2 August
Gold	Sergei Chukhray; Vladimir Parfenovich	Canoeing	Men's K-2 1000 metres	2 August
Silver	Andrey Krylov	Swimming	Men's 200 metre freestyle	21 July
Silver	Viktor Kuznetsov	Swimming	Men's 100 metre backstroke	21 July
Silver	Yurik Sarkisyan	Weightlifting	Men's 56 kg	21 July
Silver	Aleksandr Panfilov	Cycling	Men's track time trial	22 July
Silver	Rustam Yambulatov	Shooting	Mixed trap	22 July
Silver	Aleksandr Chayev	Swimming	Men's 1500 metre freestyle	22 July
Silver	Arsens Miskarovs	Swimming	Men's 100 metre breaststroke	22 July
Silver	Igor Kanygin	Wrestling	Men's Greco-Roman 90 kg	22 July
Silver	Svetlana Varganova	Swimming	Women's 200 metre breaststroke	23 July
Silver	Anatoly Bykov	Wrestling	Men's Greco-Roman 74 kg	23 July
Silver	Pyotr Pochynchuk	Athletics	Men's 20 kilometres walk	24 July
Silver	Viktor Saneyev	Athletics	Men's triple jump	24 July
Silver	Svetlana Krachevskaya	Athletics	Women's shot put	24 July
Silver	Olga Rukavishnikova	Athletics	Women's pentathlon	24 July
Silver	Nikolai Andrianov	Gymnastics	Men's artistic individual all-around	24 July
Silver	Andrey Krylov	Swimming	Men's 400 metre freestyle	24 July
Silver	Aleksandr Fedorovsky; Sergey Koplyakov; Serhiy Krasyuk; Viktor Kuznetsov; Aleksey Markovsky; Arsens Miskarovs; Yevgeny Seredin; Vladimir Shemetov	Swimming	Men's 4 × 100 metre medley relay	24 July
Silver	Oleksandr Perviy	Weightlifting	Men's 75 kg	24 July
Silver	Saida Gunba	Athletics	Women's javelin throw	25 July
Silver	Mikhail Burtsev	Fencing	Men's sabre	25 July
Silver	Nikolai Andrianov	Gymnastics	Men's floor	25 July
Silver	Alexander Dityatin	Gymnastics	Men's horizontal bar	25 July
Silver	Alexander Dityatin	Gymnastics	Men's parallel bars	25 July
Silver	Alexander Dityatin	Gymnastics	Men's pommel horse	25 July
Silver	Aleksandr Tkachyov	Gymnastics	Men's rings	25 July
Silver	Alexander Dityatin	Gymnastics	Men's vault	25 July
Silver	Yelena Davydova	Gymnastics	Women's balance beam	25 July
Silver	Vasil Yakusha	Rowing	Men's single sculls	25 July
Silver	Vasyl Arkhypenko	Athletics	Men's 400 metres hurdles	26 July
Silver	Yuriy Kutsenko	Athletics	Men's decathlon	26 July
Silver	Sirvard Emirzyan	Diving	Women's 10 metre platform	26 July
Silver	Ashot Karagyan; Vladimir Lapitsky; Alexandr Romankov; Sabirzhan Ruziyev; Vladimir Smirnov	Fencing	Men's team foil	26 July
Silver	Antonina Makhina	Rowing	Women's single sculls	26 July
Silver	Nina Cheremisina; Nadezhda Lyubimova; Yelena Matiyevskaya; Antonina Pustovit; Olga Vasilchenko	Rowing	Women's quadruple sculls	26 July
Silver	Nina Frolova; Maria Paziun; Olga Pivovarova; Nina Preobrazhenskaya; Nadezhda Prishchepa; Tatyana Stetsenko; Elena Tereshina; Nina Umanets; Valentina Zhulina	Rowing	Women's eight	26 July
Silver	Elvira Vasilkova	Swimming	Women's 100 metre breaststroke	26 July
Silver	Aleksandr Makarov	Athletics	Men's javelin throw	27 July
Silver	Olga Mineyeva	Athletics	Women's 800 metres	27 July
Silver	Aleksandr Blinov	Equestrian	Individual eventing	27 July
Silver	Nailya Gilyazova; Elena Belova; Valentina Sidorova; Larisa Tsagarayeva; Irina Ushakova	Fencing	Women's team foil	27 July
Silver	Tengiz Khubuluri	Judo	Men's 95 kg	27 July
Silver	Evgeniy Barbakov; Mykola Dovhan; Valeriy Kleshnyov; Yuriy Shapochka	Rowing	Men's quadruple sculls	27 July
Silver	Nikolay Pimenov; Yuriy Pimenov	Rowing	Men's coxless pair	27 July
Silver	Gennadi Kryuçkin; Aleksandr Lukyanov (cox); Viktor Pereverzev	Rowing	Men's coxed pair	27 July
Silver	Valeriy Dolinin; Vitaliy Eliseyev; Aleksey Kamkin; Aleksandr Kulagin	Rowing	Men's coxless four	27 July
Silver	Artūrs Garonskis; Dimants Krišjānis; Dzintars Krišjānis; Žoržs Tikmers; Juris Bērziņš (cox)	Rowing	Men's coxed four	27 July
Silver	Sergey Fesenko	Swimming	Men's 400 metre individual medley	27 July
Silver	Vladimir Aleynik	Diving	Men's 10 metre platform	28 July
Silver	Igor Nikitin	Weightlifting	Men's 100 kg	28 July
Silver	Aleksandr Budnikov; Boris Budnikov; Nikolay Polyakov	Sailing	Soling	29 July
Silver	Konstantin Volkov	Athletics	Men's pole vault	30 July
Silver	Aleksandr Baryshnikov	Athletics	Men's shot put	30 July
Silver	Natalya Bochina	Athletics	Women's 200 metres	30 July
Silver	Soviet Union men's national handball team: Aleksandr Anpilogov; Vladimir Belov; Yevgeni Chernyshov; Anatoli Fedyukin; Mykhaylo Ishchenko; Aleksandr Karshakevich; Yury Kidyayev; Vladimir Kravtsov; Serhiy Kushniryuk; Viktor Makhorin; Voldemaras Novickis; Vladimir Repyev; Mykola Tomyn; Aleksey Zhuk	Handball	Men's tournament	30 July
Silver	Sergey Litvinov	Athletics	Men's hammer throw	31 July
Silver	Magomedkhan Aratsilov	Wrestling	Men's freestyle 82 kg	31 July
Silver	Vera Anisimova; Natalya Bochina; Vera Komisova; Lyudmila Maslakova	Athletics	Women's 4 × 100 metres relay	1 August
Silver	Galina Alexeyeva; Nina Trofimova	Canoeing	Women's K-2 500 metres	1 August
Silver	Yuri Kovshov	Equestrian	Individual dressage	1 August
Silver	Boris Isachenko	Archery	Men's individual	2 August
Silver	Natalya Butuzova	Archery	Women's individual	2 August
Silver	Viktor Miroshnichenko	Boxing	Flyweight	2 August
Silver	Viktor Demyanenko	Boxing	Lightweight	2 August
Silver	Serik Konakbayev	Boxing	Light welterweight	2 August
Silver	Aleksandr Koshkin	Boxing	Light middleweight	2 August
Silver	Viktor Savchenko	Boxing	Middleweight	2 August
Silver	Pyotr Zayev	Boxing	Heavyweight	2 August
Silver	Sergei Postrekhin	Canoeing	Men's C-1 1000 metres	2 August
Silver	Nikolai Korolkov	Equestrian	Individual jumping	3 August
Bronze	Irina Aksyonova; Alla Grishchenkova; Olga Klevakina; Yelena Kruglova; Natalya Strunnikova; Elvira Vasilkova	Swimming	Women's 4 × 100 metre medley relay	20 July
Bronze	Vladimir Dolgov	Swimming	Men's 100 metre backstroke	21 July
Bronze	Boris Kramarenko	Wrestling	Men's Greco-Roman 62 kg	22 July
Bronze	Alexandr Romankov	Fencing	Men's foil	23 July
Bronze	Yuliya Bogdanova	Swimming	Women's 200 metre breaststroke	23 July
Bronze	Olga Kuragina	Athletics	Women's pentathlon	24 July
Bronze	Pavel Lednyov	Modern pentathlon	Men's individual	24 July
Bronze	Aleksandr Gazov	Shooting	Mixed 50 metre running target	24 July
Bronze	Ivar Stukolkin	Swimming	Men's 400 metre freestyle	24 July
Bronze	Alexander Dityatin	Gymnastics	Men's floor	25 July
Bronze	Nikolai Andrianov	Gymnastics	Men's horizontal bar	25 July
Bronze	Natalia Shaposhnikova	Gymnastics	Women's balance beam	25 July
Bronze	Natalia Shaposhnikova	Gymnastics	Women's floor	25 July
Bronze	Maria Filatova	Gymnastics	Women's uneven bars	25 July
Bronze	Nikolay Kirov	Athletics	Men's 800 metres	26 July
Bronze	Sergey Zhelanov	Athletics	Men's decathlon	26 July
Bronze	Sergei Kopylov	Cycling	Men's sprint	26 July
Bronze	Liana Tsotadze	Diving	Women's 10 metre platform	26 July
Bronze	Hryhoriy Dmytrenko; Viktor Kokoshyn; Andrey Luhin; Oleksandr Mantsevych; Ihar Maystrenka; Jonas Narmontas; Jonas Pinskus; Andriy Tishchenko; Oleksandr Tkachenko	Rowing	Men's eight	26 July
Bronze	Nina Cheremisina; Mariya Fadeyeva; Svetlana Semyonova; Galina Sovetnikova; Marina Studneva	Rowing	Women's coxed four	26 July
Bronze	Arsens Miskarovs	Swimming	Men's 200 metre breaststroke	26 July
Bronze	Aleksandr Puchkov	Athletics	Men's 110 metres hurdles	27 July
Bronze	Tatyana Providokhina	Athletics	Women's 800 metres	27 July
Bronze	Yuri Salnikov	Equestrian	Individual eventing	27 July
Bronze	Valeriy Pidluzhnyy	Athletics	Men's long jump	28 July
Bronze	Yuri Barinov	Cycling	Men's individual road race	28 July
Bronze	David Hambartsumyan	Diving	Men's 10 metre platform	28 July
Bronze	Aleksandrs Jackēvičs	Judo	Men's 86 kg	28 July
Bronze	Soviet Union men's national field hockey team: Minneula Azizov; Valeri Belyakov; Viktor Deputatov; Aleksandr Goncharov; Aleksandr Gusev; Sos Hayrapetyan; Sergei Klevtsov; Vyacheslav Lampeyev; Aleksandr Myasnikov; Mikhail Nichepurenko; Leonid Pavlovski; Sergei Pleshakov; Vladimir Pleshakov; Aleksandr Sychyov; Oleg Zagorodnev; Farit Zigangirov	Field hockey	Men's tournament	29 July
Bronze	Andrey Balashov	Sailing	Finn	29 July
Bronze	Sergey Kornilayev	Wrestling	Men's freestyle 48 kg	29 July
Bronze	Yevgeniy Ivchenko	Athletics	Men's 50 kilometres walk	30 July
Bronze	Soviet Union men's national basketball team: Alexander Belostenny; Sergei Belov; Nikolay Deryugin; Sergejus Jovaiša; Andrey Lopatov; Valery Miloserdov; Anatoly Myshkin; Aleksandr Salnikov; Sergei Tarakanov; Vladimir Tkachenko; Stanislav Yeryomin; Vladimir Zhigily	Basketball	Men's tournament	30 July
Bronze	Jüri Tamm	Athletics	Men's hammer throw	31 July
Bronze	Tetyana Skachko	Athletics	Women's long jump	31 July
Bronze	Viktor Rybakov	Boxing	Featherweight	31 July
Bronze	Aleksandr Abushakhmetov; Ashot Karagyan; Boris Lukomsky; Aleksandr Mozhayev; Vladimir Smirnov	Fencing	Men's team épée	31 July
Bronze	Soviet Union women's national field hockey team: Leyla Akhmerova; Natalia Buzunova; Natalia Bykova; Nadezhda Filippova; Lyudmila Frolova; Lidiya Glubokova; Nelli Gorbatkova; Yelena Guryeva; Galina Inzhuvatova; Alina Kham; Natella Krasnikova; Nadezhda Ovechkina; Tatyana Shvyganova; Galina Vyuzhanina; Tatyana Yembakhtova; Valentina Zazdravnykh	Field hockey	Women's tournament	31 July
Bronze	Satymkul Dzhumanazarov	Athletics	Men's marathon	1 August
Bronze	Nadezhda Olizarenko	Athletics	Women's 1500 metres	1 August
Bronze	Tatyana Lesovaya	Athletics	Women's discus throw	1 August
Bronze	Antonina Melnikova	Canoeing	Women's K-1 500 metres	1 August
Bronze	Viktor Ugryumov	Equestrian	Individual dressage	1 August
Bronze	Soviet Union national football team: Sergey Andreyev; Sergei Baltacha; Volodymyr Bezsonov; Revaz Chelebadze; Fyodor Cherenkov; Aleksandre Chivadze; Rinat Dasayev; Yuri Gavrilov; Valery Gazzaev; Vagiz Khidiyatullin; Sergei Nikulin; Khoren Oganesian; Vladimir Pilguy; Aleksandr Prokopenko; Oleg Romantsev; Sergey Shavlo; Tengiz Sulakvelidze	Football	Men's tournament	1 August
Bronze	Aramby Emizh	Judo	Men's 60 kg	1 August
Bronze	Yuri Lobanov; Vasyl Yurchenko	Canoeing	Men's C-2 1000 metres	2 August

== Competitors ==
Sport	Men	Women	Total
Archery	2	2	4
Athletics	64	35	99
Basketball	12	12	24
Boxing	11	—	11
Canoeing	12	3	15
Cycling	13	—	13
Diving	6	6	12
Equestrian	10	1	11
Fencing	14	5	19
Field hockey	16	16	32
Football	17	—	17
Gymnastics	6	6	12
Handball	14	13	27
Judo	8	—	8
Modern pentathlon	3	—	3
Rowing	30	24	54
Sailing	12	0	12
Shooting	14	0	14
Swimming	24	15	39
Volleyball	12	11	23
Water polo	11	—	11
Weightlifting	10	—	10
Wrestling	20	—	20
Total	341	149	490

== Archery ==
Men

Athlete	Event	90 m	70 m	50 m	30 m	Total	Rank
Boris Isachenko	Men's individual	271	303	302	341	2452	2nd place, silver medalist(s)
Boris Isachenko	Men's individual	289	312	300	334	2452	2nd place, silver medalist(s)
Vladimir Yesheyev	Men's individual	278	307	294	343	2432	6
Vladimir Yesheyev	Men's individual	268	310	306	326	2432	6

Women

Athlete	Event	70 m	60 m	50 m	30 m	Total	Rank
Natalya Butuzova	Women's individual	301	314	301	335	2477	2nd place, silver medalist(s)
Natalya Butuzova	Women's individual	278	306	300	342	2477	2nd place, silver medalist(s)
Keto Losaberidze	Women's individual	299	317	295	346	2491	1st place, gold medalist(s)
Keto Losaberidze	Women's individual	282	304	304	344	2491	1st place, gold medalist(s)

== Athletics ==
Men's competition

Men's 100 metres

- Aleksandr Aksinin

- Heat — 10.26
- Quarterfinals — 10.29
- Semifinals — 10.45
- Final — 10.42 (→ 4th place)

- Vladimir Muravyov

- Heat — 10.37
- Quarterfinals — 10.34
- Semifinals — 10.42
- Final — 10.44 (→ 6th place)

- Andrei Shlyapnikov

- Heat — 10.43
- Quarterfinals — 10.59 (→ did not advance)

Men's 200 metres

- Nikolay Sidorov

- Heat — 21.15
- Quarterfinals — 20.83
- Semifinals — 21.17 (→ did not advance)

- Vladimir Muravyov

- Heat — did not start (→ did not advance)

- Aleksandr Stasevich

- Heat — did not finish (→ did not advance)

Men's 400 metres

- Viktor Markin

- Heat — 46.88
- Quarterfinals — 45.58
- Semifinals — 45.60
- Final — 44.60 (→ (gold) Gold medal)

- Viktor Burakov

- Heat — 46.41
- Quarterfinals — 46.23
- Semifinals — 45.97 (→ did not advance)

- Nikolay Chernetsky

- Heat — 47.04
- Quarterfinals — 46.30
- Semifinals — 45.94 (→ did not advance)

Men's 800 metres

- Nikolay Kirov

- Heat — 1:47.5
- Semifinals — 1:46.7
- Final — 1:46.0 (→ (bronze) Bronze medal)

- Anatoliy Reshetnyak

- Heat — 1:47.9
- Semifinals — 1:48.2 (→ did not advance)

Men's 1,500 metres

- Vladimir Malozemlin

- Heat — 3:38.7
- Semifinals — 3:43.6 (→ did not advance)

- Vitaliy Tyshchenko

- Heat — 3:44.4
- Semifinals — 3:41.5 (→ did not advance)

- Pavel Yakovlev

- Heat — 3:44.2 (→ did not advance)

Men's 5,000 metres

- Aleksandr Fyodotkin

- Heat — 13:45.6
- Semifinals — 13:31.9
- Final — 13:24.1 (→ 8th place)

- Valery Abramov

- Heat — 13:42.9
- Semifinals — 13:40.7 (→ did not advance)

- Enn Sellik

- Heat — 13:52.4 (→ did not advance)

Men's 10,000 metres

- Enn Sellik

- Heat — 29:12.1
- Final — 28:13.8 (→ 8th place)

- Vladimir Shesterov

- Heat — 29:32.4 (→ did not advance)

- Aleksandras Antipovas

- Heat — did not finish (→ did not advance)

Men's 4x100 metres relay

- Vladimir Muravyov, Nikolay Sidorov, Aleksandr Aksinin and Andrey Prokofyev

- Heat — 38.68
- Final — 38.26 (→ (gold) Gold medal)

Men's 4x400 metres relay

- Nikolay Chernetskiy, Mikhail Linge, Remigijus Valiulis and Viktor Burakov

- Heat — 3:01.8

- Remigijus Valiulis, Mikhail Linge, Nikolay Chernetskiy and Viktor Markin

- Final — 3:01.1 (→ (gold) Gold medal)

Men's 110 m hurdles

- Aleksandr Puchkov

- Heat — 13.84
- Semifinals — 13.50
- Final — 13.44 (→ (bronze) Bronze medal)

- Andrey Prokofyev

- Heat — 13.61
- Semifinals — 13.59
- Final — 13.49 (→ 4th place)

- Yuriy Chervanov

- Heat — 13.75
- Semifinals — 13.78
- Final — 15.80 (→ 8th place)

Men's 400 m hurdles

- Vasyl Arkhypenko

- Heat — 50.22
- Semifinals — 49.80
- Final — 48.86 (→ (silver) Silver medal)

- Nikolay Vasilyev

- Heat — 50.09
- Semifinals — 49.87
- Final — 49.34 (→ 4th place)

- Aleksandr Kharlov

- Heat — 50.79
- Semifinals — 50.64 (→ did not advance)

Men's 3,000 m steeplechase

- Anatoliy Dimov

- Heat — 8:33.2
- Semifinals — 8:24.9
- Final — 8:19.8 (→ 8th place)

- Serhiy Olizarenko

- Heat — 8:34.3
- Semifinals — did not finish (→ did not advance)

- Aleksandr Vorobey

- Heat — 8:42.6
- Semifinals — 8:44.3 (→ did not advance)

Men's marathon

- Setymkul Dzhumanazarov

- Final — 2:11:35 (→ (bronze) Bronze medal)

- Vladimir Kotov

- Final — 2:12:05 (→ 4th place)

- Leonid Moseyev

- Final — 2:12:14 (→ 5th place)

Men's 20 km walk

- Pyotr Pochenchuk

- Final — 1:24:45.4 (→ (silver) Silver medal)

- Yevgeniy Yevsyukov

- Final — 1:26:28.3 (→ 4th place)

- Anatoliy Solomin

- Final — DSQ (→ no ranking)

Men's 50 km walk

- Yevgeniy Ivchenko

- Final — 3:56:32 (→ (bronze) Bronze medal)

- Vyacheslav Fursov

- Final — 3:58:32 (→ 5th place)

- Boris Yakovlev

- Final — DSQ (→ no ranking)

Men's long jump

- Valeriy Podluzhniy

- Qualification — 8.02 m
- Final — 8.18 m (→ (bronze) Bronze medal)

- Viktor Belskiy

- Qualification — 8.01 m
- Final — 8.10 m (→ 6th place)

Men's high jump

- Aleksandr Grigoryev

- Qualification — 2.21 m
- Final — 2.21 m (→ 8th place)

- Gennadiy Belkov

- Qualification — 2.21 m
- Final — 2.21 m (→ 10th place)

- Aleksey Demyanyuk

- Qualification — 2.21 m
- Final — 2.21 m (→ 11th place)

Men's pole vault

- Konstantin Volkov

- Qualification — 5.35 m
- Final — 5.65 m (→ (silver) Silver medal)

- Sergey Kulibaba

- Qualification — 5.35 m
- Final — 5.45 m (→ 8th place)

- Yuriy Prokhorenko

- Qualification — no mark (→ did not advance)

Men's triple jump

- Jaak Uudmäe

- Qualification — 16.69 m
- Final — 17.35 m (→ (gold) Gold medal)

- Viktor Saneyev

- Qualification — 16.57 m
- Final — 17.24 m (→ (silver) Silver medal)

- Yevgeni Anikin

- Qualification — 16.77 m
- Final — 16.12 m (→ 9th place)

Men's hammer throw

- Yuriy Sedykh

- Qualification — 78.22 m
- Final Round — 81.80 m (→ (gold) Gold medal)

- Sergey Litvinov

- Qualification — 75.24 m
- Final Round — 80.64 m (→ (silver) Silver medal)

- Jüri Tamm

- Qualification — 76.24 m
- Final Round — 78.96 m (→ (bronze) Bronze medal)

Men's discus throw

- Viktor Rashchupkin

- Qualification — 64.78 m
- Final — 66.64 m (→ (gold) Gold medal)

- Yuriy Dumchev

- Qualification — 62.82 m
- Final — 65.58 m (→ 5th place)

- Ihor Duhinets

- Qualification — 63.10 m
- Final — 64.04 m (→ 6th place)

Men's shot put

- Vladimir Kiselyov

- Qualification — 20.72 m
- Final — 21.35 m (→ (gold) Gold medal)

- Aleksandr Baryshnikov

- Qualification — 20.58 m
- Final — 21.08 m (→ (silver) Silver medal)

- Anatoliy Yarosh

- Qualification — 20.19 m
- Final — 19.93 m (→ 9th place)

Men's javelin throw

- Dainis Kula

- Qualification — 85.76 m
- Final — 91.20 m (→ (gold) Gold medal)

- Aleksandr Makarov

- Qualification — 83.32 m
- Final — 89.64 m (→ (silver) Silver medal)

- Heino Puuste

- Qualification — 82.96 m
- Final — 86.10 m (→ 4th place)

Men's decathlon

- Yuriy Kutsenko

- Final — 8331 points (→ (silver) Silver medal)

- Sergei Zhelanov

- Final — 8135 points (→ (bronze) Bronze medal)

- Valeriu Caceanov

- Final — did not finish (→ no ranking)

Women's competition

Women's 100 metres

- Lyudmila Kondratyeva

- Heat — 11.13
- Quarterfinals — 11.06
- Semifinals — 11.11
- Final — 11.06 (→ (gold) Gold medal)

- Vera Anisimova

- Heat — 11.53
- Quarterfinals — 11.33
- Semifinals — 11.51 (→ did not advance)

- Natalya Bochina

- Heat — 11.38
- Quarterfinals — 11.30
- Semifinals — 11.38 (→ did not advance)

Women's 200 metres

- Natalya Bochina

- Heat — 23.28
- Quarterfinals — 22.26
- Semifinals — 22.75
- Final — 22.19 (→ (silver) Silver medal)

- Lyudmila Maslakova

- Heat — 23.49
- Quarterfinals — 23.24
- Semifinals — 23.27 (→ did not advance)

Women's 400 metres

- Irina Nazarova

- Heat — 51.66
- Semifinals — 50.18
- Final — 50.07 (→ 4th place)

- Nina Ziuskova

- Heat — 51.42
- Semifinals — 51.12
- Final — 50.17 (→ 5th place)

- Lyudmila Chernova

- Heat — 51.51
- Semifinals — 51.30 (→ did not advance)

Women's 800 metres

- Nadiya Olizarenko

- Heat — 1:59.3
- Semifinals — 1:57.7
- Final — 1:53.5 (→ (gold) Gold medal)

- Olga Mineyeva

- Heat — 2:01.5
- Semifinals — 1:57.5
- Final — 1:54.9 (→ (silver) Silver medal)

- Tatyana Providokhina

- Heat — 1:58.5
- Semifinals — 1:58.3
- Final — 1:55.5 (→ (bronze) Bronze medal)

Women's 1,500 metres

- Tatyana Kazankina

- Heat — 3:59.2
- Final — 3:56.6 (→ (gold) Gold medal)

- Nadiya Olizarenko

- Heat — 3:59.5
- Final — 3:59.6 (→ (bronze) Bronze medal)

- Lyubov Smolka

- Heat — 4:04.4
- Final — 4:01.3 (→ 6th place)

Women's 100 m hurdles

- Vera Komisova

- Heat — 12.67
- Semifinal — 12.78
- Final — 12.56 (→ (gold) Gold medal)

- Irina Litovchenko

- Heat — 12.97
- Semifinal — 12.84
- Final — 12.84 (→ 6th place)

- Tatyana Anisimova

- Heat — 13.31
- Semifinal — did not start (→ did not advance)

Women's 4x100 metres relay

- Vera Komisova, Lyudmila Maslakova, Vera Anisimova and Natalya Bochina

- Final — 42.10 (→ (silver) Silver medal)

Women's 4x400 metres relay

- Tatyana Prorochenko, Tatyana Goyshchik, Lyudmila Chernova and Olga Mineyeva

- Heat — 3:25.3

- Tatyana Prorochenko, Tatyana Goyshchik, Nina Ziuskova and Irina Nazarova

- Final — 3:20.2 (→ (gold) Gold medal)

Women's high jump

- Marina Sysoeva

- Qualification — 1.88 m
- Final — 1.91 m (→ 5th place)

- Tamara Bykova

- Qualification — 1.88 m
- Final — 1.88 m (→ 9th place)

- Marina Serkova

- Qualification — 1.80 m (→ did not advance)

Women's long jump

- Tatyana Kolpakova

- Qualification — 6.70 m
- Final — 7.06 m (→ (gold) Gold medal)

- Tetyana Skachko

- Qualification — 6.56 m
- Final — 7.01 m (→ (bronze) Bronze medal)

- Lidiya Alfeyeva

- Qualification — 6.78 m
- Final — 6.71 m (→ 8th place)

Women's discus throw

- Tatyana Lesovaya

- Qualification — 62.20 m
- Final — 67.40 m (→ (bronze) Bronze medal)

- Galina Murašova

- Qualification — 60.32 m
- Final — 63.84 m (→ 7th place)

- Faina Melnik

- Qualification — 53.76 m (→ did not advance)

Women's javelin throw

- Saida Gunba

- Qualification — 63.98 m
- Final — 67.76 m (→ (silver) Silver medal)

- Tatyana Biryulina

- Qualification — 59.86 m
- Final — 65.08 m (→ 6th place)

- Yadviga Putiniene

- Qualification — 62.96 m
- Final — 59.94 m (→ 11th place)

Women's shot put

- Svetlana Krachevskaia

- Final — 21.42 m (→ (silver) Silver medal)

- Nunu Abashidze

- Final — 21.15 m (→ 4th place)

- Natalya Akhrimenko

- Final — 19.74 m (→ 7th place)

Women's pentathlon

- Nadiya Tkachenko — 5083 points (→ (gold) Gold medal)
  1. 100 metres — 13.29s
  2. Shot put — 16.84m
  3. High jump — 1.84m
  4. Long jump — 6.73m
  5. 800 metres — 2:05.20
- Olga Rukavishnikova — 4937 points (→ (silver) Silver medal)
  1. 100 metres — 13.66s
  2. Shot put — 14.09m
  3. High jump — 1.88m
  4. Long jump — 6.79m
  5. 800 metres — 2:04.80
- Olga Kuragina — 4875 points (→ (bronze) Bronze medal)
  1. 100 metres — 13.26s
  2. Shot put — 12.49m
  3. High jump — 1.84m
  4. Long jump — 6.77m
  5. 800 metres — 2:03.60

== Basketball ==
Summary

Team	Event	Preliminary round				Final round / Classification round						Final / BM	
Team	Event	Opposition Score	Opposition Score	Opposition Score	Rank	Opposition Score	Opposition Score	Opposition Score	Opposition Score	Opposition Score	Rank	Opposition Score	Rank
Soviet Union men's	Men's tournament	India; W 121–65	Brazil; W 101–88	Czechoslovakia; W 99–82	1 Q	(International Olympic Committee) Spain; W 102–81	(International Olympic Committee) Italy; L 85–87	Yugoslavia; L 91–101	Cuba; W 109–90	—N/a	3 q	(International Olympic Committee) Spain; W 117–74	3rd place, bronze medalist(s)
Soviet Union women's	Women's tournament	—N/a				Yugoslavia; W 97–62	Bulgaria; W 122–83	(International Olympic Committee) Italy; W 119–53	Cuba; W 95–56	Hungary; W 120–62	1 Q	Bulgaria; W 104–73	1st place, gold medalist(s)

Men's roster
- Stanislav Yeryomin
- Valery Miloserdov
- Sergei Tarakanov
- Aleksandr Salnikov
- Andrey Lopatov
- Nikolay Deryugin
- Sergei Belov
- Vladimir Tkachenko
- Anatoly Myshkin
- Sergejus Jovaiša
- Alexander Belostenny
- Vladimir Zhigily

Women's roster
- Angelė Rupšienė
- Lyubov Sharmay
- Vida Beselienė
- Olga Korostelyova
- Tatyana Ovechkina
- Nadezhda Olkhova
- Uljana Semjonova
- Lyudmila Rogozhina
- Nelli Feryabnikova
- Olga Sukharnova
- Tetiana Nadyrova
- Tatyana Ivinskaya

== Boxing ==
Athlete	Event	Round of 64	Round of 32	Round of 16	Quarterfinals	Semifinals	Final	
Athlete	Event	Opposition Result	Opposition Result	Opposition Result	Opposition Result	Opposition Result	Opposition Result	Rank
Shamil Sabirov	Light flyweight	—N/a	Bye	Miguel (POR); W 5–0	Geilich (GDR); W 4–1	Li (PRK); W 5–0	Ramos (CUB); W 3–2	1st place, gold medalist(s)
Viktor Miroshnichenko	Flyweight	—N/a	Bye	Hernández (CUB); W 4–1	Średnicki (POL); W 5–0	Váradi (HUN); W 4–1	Lesov (BUL); L RSC	2nd place, silver medalist(s)
Samson Khachatryan	Bantamweight	Bye	Tena (DOM); W 5–0	Ahanda (CMR); W 5–0	Cipere (ROU); L 1–4	Did not advance		
Viktor Rybakov	Featherweight	Bye	Londas (FRA); W 5–0	Hanlon (GBR); W 5–0	Andreykovski (BUL); W 4–1	Fink (GDR); L 1–4	Did not advance	3rd place, bronze medalist(s)
Viktor Demyanenko	Lightweight	—N/a	Bangura (SLE); W DSQ	Jong (PRK); W 5–0	Lesov (BUL); W 5–0	Nowakowski (GDR); W RSC	Herrera (CUB); L RSC	2nd place, silver medalist(s)
Serik Konakbayev	Light welterweight	—N/a	Cuțov (ROU); W 5–0	Bacskai (HUN); W RET	Molina (PUR); W WO	Aguilar (CUB); W 4–1	Oliva (ITA); L 1–4	2nd place, silver medalist(s)
Israel Akopkokhyan	Welterweight	—N/a	Bye	Aldama (CUB); L 2–3	Did not advance			
Aleksandr Koshkin	Light middleweight	—N/a	Bye	Beden (IRQ); W KO	Wilshire (GBR); W KO	Kästner (GDR); W 5–0	Martínez (CUB); L 1–4	2nd place, silver medalist(s)
Viktor Savchenko	Middleweight	—N/a	Škaro (YUG); L RSC	Pfitscher (AUT); W RSC	Trauten (GDR); W RSC	Rybicki (POL); W RSC	Gómez (CUB); L 1–4	2nd place, silver medalist(s)
David Kvachadze	Light heavyweight	—N/a		Straughn (GBR); W RSC	Kačar (YUG); L 1–4	Did not advance		
Pyotr Zayev	Heavyweight	—N/a		Salihu (YUG); W 5–0	Damiani (ITA); W 5–0	Fanghänel (GDR); W 5–0	Stevenson (CUB); L 1–4	2nd place, silver medalist(s)

== Canoeing ==
Men

Athlete	Event	Heats		Repechage		Semifinals		Final	
Athlete	Event	Time	Rank	Time	Rank	Time	Rank	Time	Rank
Sergei Postrekhin	C-1 500 m	1:54.13	1 QF	—N/a		Bye		1:53.37	1st place, gold medalist(s)
Sergei Postrekhin	C-1 1000 m	4:07.39	3 QF	—N/a		Bye		4:13.53	2nd place, silver medalist(s)
Serhiy Petrenko; Aleksandr Vinogradov	C-2 500 m	1:44.54	3 QF	—N/a		Bye		1:46.95	6
Vasyl Yurchenko; Yuri Lobanov	C-2 1000 m	3:41.32	2 QF	—N/a		Bye		3:51.28	3rd place, bronze medalist(s)
Vladimir Parfenovich	K-1 500 m	1:44.80	1 QS	Bye		1:43.24	1 QF	1:43.43	1st place, gold medalist(s)
Rasmutis Višinskis	K-1 1000 m	3:48.57	4 QR	3:50.29	1 QS	3:54.52	4	Did not advance	
Vladimir Parfenovich; Sergei Chukhray	K-2 500 m	1:33.75	1 QS	Bye		1:34.71	1 QF	1:32.38	1st place, gold medalist(s)
Vladimir Parfenovich; Sergei Chukhray	K-2 1000 m	3:24.61	1 QS	Bye		3:35.81	1 QF	3:26.72	1st place, gold medalist(s)
Gennady Makhnev; Serhei Nahorny; Aleksandr Avdeyev; Vladimir Tainikov	K-4 1000 m	3:02.70	1 QF	—N/a		Bye		3:19.83	7

Women

Athlete	Event	Heats		Semifinal		Final	
Athlete	Event	Time	Rank	Time	Rank	Time	Rank
Antonina Melnikova	K-1 500 m	1:58.74	1 QF	Bye		1:59.66	3rd place, bronze medalist(s)
Galina Alekseyeva; Nina Trofimova	K-2 500 m	1:47.07	1 QF	Bye		1:46.91	2nd place, silver medalist(s)

== Cycling ==
Thirteen cyclists represented the Soviet Union in 1980.

=== Road ===
Athlete	Event	Time	Rank
Yuri Barinov	Road race		3rd place, bronze medalist(s)
Yury Kashirin	Road race		23
Sergei Sukhoruchenkov	Road race	4:48:28.9	1st place, gold medalist(s)
Anatoly Yarkin	Road race		6
Yury Kashirin; Oleg Logvin; Sergey Shelpakov; Anatoly Yarkin	Team time trial	2:01:21.74	1st place, gold medalist(s)

=== Track ===
Pursuit

Athlete	Event	Qualification		Quarterfinals	Semifinals	Final / BM	
Athlete	Event	Time	Rank	Opposition Time	Opposition Time	Opposition Time	Rank
Vladimir Osokin	Individual pursuit	4:41.51	5 Q	Dill-Bundi (SUI); L 4:38.17	Did not advance		
Aleksandr Krasnov; Viktor Manakov; Valery Movchan; Vladimir Osokin; Vitaly Petrakov	Team pursuit	4:16.62	1 Q	Australia; W 4:14.64	Czechoslovakia; W 4:26.52	East Germany; W 4:15.70	1st place, gold medalist(s)

Sprint

Athlete	Event	Preliminary Round 1	Round 1 Repechage	Preliminary Round 2	Round 2 Repechage	Round of 16	Round of 16 Repechage	Quarterfinals	Semifinals	Final / BM	
Athlete	Event	Opposition Time	Opposition Time	Opposition Time	Opposition Time	Opposition Time	Opposition Time	Opposition Time	Opposition Time	Opposition Time	Rank
Sergei Kopylov	Sprint	Ahokas (FIN); W WO	Bye	Joseph (GUY); W 10.55	Bye	Tucker (AUS); W 10.55	Bye	Dazzan (ITA); W 10.76, W 11.00	Heßlich (GDR); L, L	Tkáč (TCH); W 10.56, W 10.47	3rd place, bronze medalist(s)

Time trial

Athlete	Event	Time	Rank
Aleksandr Panfilov	1 km time trial	1:04.845	2nd place, silver medalist(s)

== Diving ==
Men

Athlete	Event	Preliminary		Final		Total	
Athlete	Event	Points	Rank	Points	Rank	Points	Rank
Aleksandr Kosenkov	3 m springboard	558.90	4 Q	575.67	4	279.450	5
Aleksandr Portnov	3 m springboard	580.11	2 Q	614.97	1	905.025	1st place, gold medalist(s)
Vyacheslav Troshin	3 m springboard	552.42	7 Q	543.84	7	820.050	7
Vladimir Aleynik	10 m platform	539.07	2 Q	550.17	4	819.705	2nd place, silver medalist(s)
David Hambartsumyan	10 m platform	518.82	4 Q	558.03	2	817.440	3rd place, bronze medalist(s)
Sergey Nemtsanov	10 m platform	487.20	8 Q	532.26	6	775.860	7

Women

Athlete	Event	Preliminary		Final		Total	
Athlete	Event	Points	Rank	Points	Rank	Points	Rank
Irina Kalinina	3 m springboard	478.86	1 Q	486.48	1	725.910	1st place, gold medalist(s)
Irina Sidorova	3 m springboard	432.57	5 Q	433.98	8	650.265	7
Zhanna Tsiryulnikova	3 m springboard	454.35	2 Q	446.49	5	673.665	4
Sirvard Emirzyan	10 m platform	381.99	1 Q	385.47	3	576.465	2nd place, silver medalist(s)
Yelena Matyushenko	10 m platform	351.00	6 Q	364.68	4	540.180	5
Liana Tsotadze	10 m platform	360.87	2 Q	395.49	2	575.925	3rd place, bronze medalist(s)

== Equestrian ==
Individual dressage

- Yuriy Kovshov → (silver) Silver medal
- Viktor Ugryumov → (bronze) Bronze medal
- Vera Misevich → 4th place

Team dressage

- Yuriy Kovshov, Viktor Ugryumov, Vera Misevich → (gold) Gold medal

Individual eventing

- Aleksandr Blinov → (silver) Silver medal
- Yuri Salnikov → (bronze) Bronze medal
- Valery Volkov → 4th place
- Sergey Rogozhin → 11th place

Team eventing

- Aleksandr Blinov, Yuri Salnikov, Valery Volkov, Sergey Rogozhin → (gold) Gold medal

Individual jumping

- Nikolai Korolkov → (silver) Silver medal
- Viktor Poganovsky → 5th place
- Vyacheslav Chukanov → 9th place

Team jumping

- Nikolai Korolkov, Viktor Poganovsky, Vyacheslav Chukanov, Viktor Asmaev → (gold) Gold medal

== Fencing ==
18 fencers, 13 men and 5 women, represented Soviet Union in 1980.

Men's foil

- Volodymyr Smyrnov → (gold) Gold medal
- Aleksandr Romankov → (bronze) Bronze medal
- Sabirzhan Ruziyev → 4th place

Men's team foil

- Aleksandr Romankov, Volodymyr Smyrnov, Sabirzhan Ruziyev, Ashot Karagyan, Vladimir Lapitsky → (silver) Silver medal

Men's épée

- Aleksandr Mozhayev → 5th place
- Boris Lukomsky → 7th place
- Aleksandr Abushakhmetov → 9th place

Men's team épée

- Ashot Karagyan, Aleksandr Abushakhmetov, Aleksandr Mozhayev, Boris Lukomsky, Volodymyr Smyrnov → (bronze) Bronze medal

Men's sabre

- Viktor Krovopuskov → (gold) Gold medal
- Mikhail Burtsev → (silver) Silver medal
- Vladimir Nazlymov → 8th place

Men's team sabre

- Viktor Sidyak, Vladimir Nazlymov, Viktor Krovopuskov, Mikhail Burtsev, Nikolay Alyokhin → (gold) Gold medal

Women's foil

- Nailya Gilyazova → 9th place
- Yelena Novikova-Belova → 9th place
- Valentina Sidorova → 13th place

Women's team foil

- Valentina Sidorova, Nailya Gilyazova, Yelena Novikova-Belova, Irina Ushakova, Larisa Tsagarayeva → (silver) Silver medal

== Field hockey ==
Summary

Team	Event	Preliminary round						Final / BM / Pl	
Team	Event	Opposition Score	Opposition Score	Opposition Score	Opposition Score	Opposition Score	Rank	Opposition Score	Rank
Soviet Union men's	Men's tournament	(International Olympic Committee) Spain; L 1–2	Cuba; W 11–2	Poland; W 5–1	Tanzania; W 11–2	India; L 2–4	3 q	Poland; W 2–1	3rd place, bronze medalist(s)
Soviet Union women's	Women's tournament	Czechoslovakia; W 2–0	Austria; L 0–2	Zimbabwe; L 0–2	Poland; W 6–0	India; W 3–1	3rd place, bronze medalist(s)	—N/a	

Men's roster
- Vladimir Pleshakov
- Vyacheslav Lampeyev
- Leonid Pavlovski
- Sos Hayrapetyan
- Farit Zigangirov
- Valeri Belyakov
- Sergei Klevtsov
- Oleg Zagorodnev
- Aleksandr Gusev
- Sergei Pleshakov
- Mikhail Nichepurenko
- Minneula Azizov
- Aleksandr Sychyov
- Aleksandr Myasnikov
- Viktor Deputatov
- Aleksandr Goncharov

Women's roster
- Galina Inzhuvatova
- Nelli Gorbatkova
- Valentina Zazdravnykh
- Nadezhda Ovechkina
- Natella Krasnikova
- Natalia Bykova
- Lidiya Glubokova
- Galina Vyuzhanina
- Natalia Buzunova
- Leyla Akhmerova
- Nadezhda Filippova
- Yelena Guryeva
- Tatyana Yembakhtova
- Tatyana Shvyganova
- Alina Kham
- Lyudmila Frolova

== Football ==
Summary

Team	Preliminary round				Quarterfinals	Semifinals	Final / BM	
Team	Opposition Score	Opposition Score	Opposition Score	Rank	Opposition Score	Opposition Score	Opposition Score	Rank
Soviet Union men's	Venezuela; W 4–0	Zambia; W 3–1	Cuba; W 8–0	1 Q	Kuwait; W 2–1	East Germany; L 0–1	Yugoslavia; W 2–0	3rd place, bronze medalist(s)

Team roster

- Rinat Dasayev
- Tengiz Sulakvelidze
- Aleksandre Chivadze
- Vagiz Khidiyatullin
- Oleg Romantsev
- Sergey Shavlo
- Sergey Andreyev
- Volodymyr Bezsonov
- Yuri Gavrilov
- Fyodor Cherenkov
- Valery Gazzaev
- Vladimir Pilguy
- Sergei Baltacha
- Sergei Nikulin
- Khoren Oganesian
- Aleksandr Prokopenko
- Revaz Chelebadze

== Gymnastics ==
Men

Athlete	Event		Apparatus						Total	Rank
Athlete	Event		F	PH	R	V	PB	HB	Total	Rank
Nikolai Andrianov	Qualification	C	9.90	9.75	9.80	9.90	9.80	9.80	59.075	2 Q
Nikolai Andrianov	Qualification	O	9.85	9.85	9.85	9.90	9.90	9.85	59.075	2 Q
Nikolai Andrianov	Qualification	Total	9.875 Q	9.800	9.825	9.900 Q	9.850	9.825 Q	59.075	2 Q
Nikolai Andrianov	All-around		9.800	9.900	9.950	10.000	9.850	9.950	118.225	2nd place, silver medalist(s)
Nikolai Andrianov	Floor		9.850	—N/a					19.725	2nd place, silver medalist(s)
Nikolai Andrianov	Vault		—N/a			9.925	—N/a		19.825	1st place, gold medalist(s)
Nikolai Andrianov	Horizontal bar		—N/a					9.850	19.675	3rd place, bronze medalist(s)
Eduard Azaryan	Qualification	C	9.75	9.80	9.75	9.75	9.65	9.75	58.700	4
Eduard Azaryan	Qualification	O	9.80	9.90	9.85	9.85	9.75	9.80	58.700	4
Eduard Azaryan	Qualification	Total	9.775	9.850	9.800	9.800	9.700	9.775	58.700	4
Alexander Dityatin	Qualification	C	9.80	9.90	9.90	9.85	9.80	9.80	59.200	1 Q
Alexander Dityatin	Qualification	O	9.80	9.90	9.95	9.90	9.90	9.90	59.200	1 Q
Alexander Dityatin	Qualification	Total	9.800 Q	9.900 Q	9.925 Q	9.875 Q	9.850 Q	9.850 Q	59.200	1 Q
Alexander Dityatin	All-around		9.800	9.900	9.950	10.000	9.850	9.950	118.650	1st place, gold medalist(s)
Alexander Dityatin	Floor		9.900	—N/a					19.700	3rd place, bronze medalist(s)
Alexander Dityatin	Pommel horse		—N/a	9.900	—N/a				19.800	2nd place, silver medalist(s)
Alexander Dityatin	Rings		—N/a		9.950	—N/a			19.875	1st place, gold medalist(s)
Alexander Dityatin	Vault		—N/a			9.925	—N/a		19.800	2nd place, silver medalist(s)
Alexander Dityatin	Parallel bars		—N/a				9.900	—N/a	19.750	2nd place, silver medalist(s)
Alexander Dityatin	Horizontal bar		—N/a					9.900	19.750	2nd place, silver medalist(s)
Bohdan Makuts	Qualification	C	9.75	9.70	9.55	9.90	9.60	9.65	58.475	6
Bohdan Makuts	Qualification	O	9.80	9.75	9.80	9.85	9.90	9.70	58.475	6
Bohdan Makuts	Qualification	Total	9.775	9.725	9.675	9.875	9.750	9.675	58.475	6
Vladimir Markelov	Qualification	C	9.70	9.80	9.65	9.80	9.10	9.75	57.800	9
Vladimir Markelov	Qualification	O	9.70	9.80	9.85	9.60	9.80	9.85	57.800	9
Vladimir Markelov	Qualification	Total	9.700	9.800	9.750	9.700	9.450	9.800	57.800	9
Aleksandr Tkachyov	Qualification	C	9.60	9.90	9.80	9.90	9.85	9.10	58.700	4 Q
Aleksandr Tkachyov	Qualification	O	9.90	9.85	9.85	9.80	9.90	9.95	58.700	4 Q
Aleksandr Tkachyov	Qualification	Total	9.750	9.875 Q	9.825 Q	9.850	9.875 Q	9.525	58.700	4 Q
Aleksandr Tkachyov	All-around		9.550	9.800	9.850	9.900	9.900	10.000	117.700	4
Aleksandr Tkachyov	Pommel horse		—N/a	9.600	—N/a				19.475	5
Aleksandr Tkachyov	Rings		—N/a		9.900	—N/a			19.725	2nd place, silver medalist(s)
Aleksandr Tkachyov	Parallel bars		—N/a				9.900	—N/a	19.775	1st place, gold medalist(s)
Nikolai Andrianov; Eduard Azaryan; Alexander Dityatin; Bogdan Makuts; Vladimir Markelov; Aleksandr Tkachyov	Team all-around		98.05	98.45	98.25	98.65	98.10	98.10	589.60	1st place, gold medalist(s)

Women

Athlete	Event		Apparatus				Total	Rank
Athlete	Event		V	UB	BB	F	Total	Rank
Yelena Davydova	Qualification	C	9.90	9.80	9.90	9.80	39.500	5 Q
Yelena Davydova	Qualification	O	9.90	9.90	9.80	10.00	39.500	5 Q
Yelena Davydova	Qualification	Total	9.900 Q	9.850	9.850 Q	9.900	39.500	5 Q
Yelena Davydova	All-around		9.900	9.950	9.850	9.950	79.150	1st place, gold medalist(s)
Yelena Davydova	Vault		9.675	—N/a			19.575	4
Yelena Davydova	Balance beam		—N/a		9.900	—N/a	19.750	2nd place, silver medalist(s)
Maria Filatova	Qualification	C	9.90	9.85	9.90	9.80	39.400	7
Maria Filatova	Qualification	O	9.80	9.90	9.70	9.95	39.400	7
Maria Filatova	Qualification	Total	9.850	9.875	9.80	9.875	39.400	7
Nellie Kim	Qualification	C	9.90	9.90	9.90	9.90	39.475	6 Q
Nellie Kim	Qualification	O	9.75	9.85	9.80	9.95	39.475	6 Q
Nellie Kim	Qualification	Total	9.825	9.875 Q	9.850	9.925 Q	39.475	6 Q
Nellie Kim	All-around		9.700	9.850	9.950	9.450	78.425	5
Nellie Kim	Uneven bars		—N/a	9.850	—N/a		19.725	6
Nellie Kim	Floor		—N/a			9.950	19.875	1st place, gold medalist(s)
Yelena Naimushina	Qualification	C	9.85	9.75	9.80	9.85	39.200	12
Yelena Naimushina	Qualification	O	9.60	9.75	9.85	9.95	39.200	12
Yelena Naimushina	Qualification	Total	9.725	9.750	9.825	9.900	39.200	12
Natalia Shaposhnikova	Qualification	C	10.00	9.95	9.95	9.95	39.575	2 Q
Natalia Shaposhnikova	Qualification	O	9.80	9.80	9.80	9.90	39.575	2 Q
Natalia Shaposhnikova	Qualification	Total	9.900 Q	9.875	9.875 Q	9.925	39.575	2 Q
Natalia Shaposhnikova	All-around		9.900	9.900	9.900	9.750	79.025	4
Natalia Shaposhnikova	Vault		9.825	—N/a			19.725	1st place, gold medalist(s)
Natalia Shaposhnikova	Balance beam		—N/a		9.850	—N/a	19.725	3rd place, bronze medalist(s)
Stella Zakharova	Qualification	C	9.90	9.90	9.80	9.80	39.375	8
Stella Zakharova	Qualification	O	9.75	9.80	9.90	9.90	39.375	8
Stella Zakharova	Qualification	Total	9.825	9.850	9.850	9.850	39.375	8
Yelena Davydova; Maria Filatova; Nellie Kim; Yelena Naimushina; Natalia Shaposhnikova; Stella Zakharova	Team all-around		98.600	98.650	98.600	99.050	394.900	1st place, gold medalist(s)

== Handball ==
Summary

Team	Event	Preliminary round						Final / BM / Pl	
Team	Event	Opposition Score	Opposition Score	Opposition Score	Opposition Score	Opposition Score	Rank	Opposition Score	Rank
Soviet Union men's	Men's tournament	(International Olympic Committee) Switzerland; W 22–15	Kuwait; W 38–11	Algeria; W 33–10	Romania; L 19–22	Yugoslavia; W 22–17	1 Q	East Germany; L 22–23 (OT)	2nd place, silver medalist(s)
Soviet Union women's	Women's tournament	Congo; W 30–11	Czechoslovakia; W 17–7	Hungary; W 16–12	Yugoslavia; W 18–9	East Germany; W 18–13	1st place, gold medalist(s)	—N/a	

Men's roster
- Mykhaylo Ishchenko
- Mykola Tomyn
- Aleksandr Anpilogov
- Vladimir Belov
- Yevgeni Chernyshov
- Anatoli Fedyukin
- Aleksandr Karshakevich
- Yury Kidyayev
- Vladimir Kravtsov
- Serhiy Kushniryuk
- Viktor Makhorin
- Voldemaras Novickis
- Vladimir Repyev
- Aleksey Zhuk

Women's roster
- Nataliya Tymoshkina
- Larysa Karlova
- Tetyana Kocherhina
- Valentyna Lutayeva
- Aldona Nenėnienė
- Lyubov Odynokova
- Iryna Palchykova
- Zinaida Turchyna
- Lyudmila Poradnyk
- Yuliya Safina
- Sigita Strečen
- Olha Zubaryeva
- Larisa Savkina
- Natalya Lukyanenko

== Judo ==
Extra lightweight (60 kg)

- Aramby Emizh → (bronze) Bronze medal

Half lightweight (65 kg)

- Nikolai Solodukhin → (gold) Gold medal

Lightweight (71 kg)

- Tamaz Namgalauri → 12th place

Half middleweight (78 kg)

- Shota Khabareli → (gold) Gold medal

Middleweight (86 kg)

- Aleksandrs Jackēvičs → (bronze) Bronze medal

Half heavyweight (95 kg)

- Tengiz Khubuluri → (silver) Silver medal

Heavyweight (+95 kg)

- Vitaly Kuznetsov → 10th place

Open category

- Serhiy Novikov → 5 place

== Modern pentathlon ==
Athlete	Event	Riding				Fencing (épée one touch)			Shooting (10 m air pistol)			Swimming (300 m freestyle)			Running			Total points	Final rank
Athlete	Event	Time	Penalties	Rank	MP Points	Results	Rank	MP Points	Points	Rank	MP Points	Time	Rank	MP Points	Time	Rank	MP Points	Total points	Final rank
Pavel Lednyov	Individual	2:01.8	74	21	1026	30–12	=2	1026	195	=13	1022	3:41.494	31	1104	13:07.7	4	1204	5382	3rd place, bronze medalist(s)
Yevgeny Lipeyev	Individual	1:59.0	0	5	1100	24–18	=11	870	186	=40	824	3:25.358	7	1232	13:25.2	10	1150	5176	14
Anatoly Starostin	Individual	2:00.9	32	13	1068	29–13	=4	1000	199	2	1110	3:27.418	10	1216	13:17.2	8	1174	5568	1st place, gold medalist(s)
Pavel Lednyov; Yevgeny Lipeyev; Anatoly Starostin	Team																	16126	1st place, gold medalist(s)

== Rowing ==
The Soviet Union had 30 male and 24 female rowers participate in all 14 rowing events in 1980.

Men

Athlete	Event	Heats		Repechage		Semifinals		Final	
Athlete	Event	Time	Rank	Time	Rank	Time	Rank	Time	Rank
Vasil Yakusha	Single sculls	7:47.15	1 Q	Bye		7:15.14	2 FA	7:11.66	2nd place, silver medalist(s)
Aleksandr Fomchenko; Yevgeniy Duleyev	Double sculls	7:07.12	3 R	6:37.77	1 FA	—N/a		6:35.34	5
Yuriy Pimenov; Nikolay Pimenov	Coxless pair	7:25.09	1 Q	Bye		6:52.11	1 FA	6:50.50	2nd place, silver medalist(s)
Viktor Pereverzev; Gennadi Kryuçkin; Aleksandr Lukyanov	Coxed pair	7:38.49	2 R	7:15.38	1 FA	—N/a		7:03.35	2nd place, silver medalist(s)
Yuriy Shapochka; Evgeni Barbakov; Valeri Kleshnyov; Mykola Dovhan	Quadruple sculls	6:14.67	4 R	5:57.82	1 FA	—N/a		5:51.47	2nd place, silver medalist(s)
Aleksey Kamkin; Valeriy Dolinin; Aleksandr Kulagin; Vitali Eliseev	Coxless four	6:31.71	1 FA	Bye		—N/a		6:11.81	2nd place, silver medalist(s)
Artūrs Garonskis; Dimants Krišjānis; Dzintars Krišjānis; Žoržs Tikmers; Juris Bērziņš	Coxed four	6:50.29	3 R	6:28.14	1 FA	—N/a		6:19.05	2nd place, silver medalist(s)
Viktor Kokoshyn; Andriy Tishchenko; Oleksandr Tkachenko; Jonas Pinskus; Jonas Narmontas; Andrey Luhin; Oleksandr Mantsevych; Ihar Maystrenka; Hryhoriy Dmytrenko	Eight	5:50.76	1 FA	Bye		—N/a		5:52.66	3rd place, bronze medalist(s)

Women

Athlete	Event	Heats		Repechage		Semifinals		Final	
Athlete	Event	Time	Rank	Time	Rank	Time	Rank	Time	Rank
Antonina Makhina	Single sculls	4:13.39	3 R	3:54.10	1 Q	3:43.68	2 FA	3:47.22	2nd place, silver medalist(s)
Yelena Khloptseva; Larisa Popova	Double sculls	3:25.51	1 FA	Bye		—N/a		3:16.27	1st place, gold medalist(s)
Larisa Zavarzina; Galina Stepanova	Coxless pair	3:55.08	1 FA	Bye		—N/a		4:12.53	5
Antonina Pustovit; Yelena Matiyevskaya; Olga Vasilchenko; Nadezhda Lyubimova; Nina Cheremisina; Nataliya Kazak	Quadruple sculls	3:16.76	2 R	3:19.88	2 FA	—N/a		3:15.73	2nd place, silver medalist(s)
Mariya Fadeyeva; Galina Sovetnikova; Marina Studneva; Svetlana Semyonova; Nina Cheremisina; Nataliya Kazak	Coxed four	3:28.72	2 R	3:21.51	1 FA	—N/a		3:20.92	3rd place, bronze medalist(s)
Nina Frolova; Maria Paziun; Olga Pivovarova; Nina Preobrazhenskaya; Nadezhda Prishchepa; Tatyana Stetsenko; Elena Tereshina; Nina Umanets; Valentina Zhulina	Eight	3:11.72	1 FA	Bye		—N/a		3:04.29	2nd place, silver medalist(s)

== Sailing ==
Athlete	Event	Race														Net points	Final rank
Athlete	Event	1		2		3		4		5		6		7		Net points	Final rank
Athlete	Event	Rank	Points	Rank	Points	Rank	Points	Rank	Points	Rank	Points	Rank	Points	Rank	Points	Net points	Final rank
Vladimir Ignatenko; Sergei Ždanov	470	8	14.0	4	8.0	9	15.0	8	14.0	2	3.0	~~DSQ~~	~~22.0~~	8	14.0	68.0	10
Andrey Balashov	Finn	6	11.7	14	20.0	3	5.7	1	0.0	5	10.0	~~16~~	~~22.0~~	1	0.0	47.4	3rd place, bronze medalist(s)
Vladimir Leontiev; Valeri Zubanov	Flying Dutchman	6	11.7	7	13.0	1	0.0	1	0.0	8	14.0	7	13.0	~~9~~	~~15.0~~	51.7	5
Boris Budnikov; Aleksandr Budnikov; Nikolay Polyakov	Soling	3	5.7	~~8~~	~~14.0~~	3	5.7	2	3.0	5	10.0	2	3.0	2	3.0	30.4	2nd place, silver medalist(s)
Valentin Mankin; Aleksandr Muzychenko	Star	2	3.0	1	0.0	1	0.0	5	10.0	1	0.0	6	11.7	~~7~~	~~13.0~~	24.7	1st place, gold medalist(s)
Viktor Potapov; Aleksandr Zybin	Tornado	~~6~~	~~11.7~~	3	5.7	5	10.0	4	8.0	3	5.7	3	5.7	1	0.0	35.1	4

== Shooting ==
Open

Athlete	Event	Final	
Athlete	Event	Score	Rank
Aleksandr Asanov	Trap	195	6
Aleksandr Bulkin	50 m rifle prone	596	11
Aleksandr Gazov	50 m running target	587	3rd place, bronze medalist(s)
Tamaz Imnaishvili	Skeet	195	9
Afanasijs Kuzmins	25 m rapid fire pistol	595	6
Aleksandr Mastyanin	50 m rifle prone	597	6
Aleksandr Melentyev	50 m free pistol	581	1st place, gold medalist(s)
Aleksandr Mitrofanov	50 m rifle three positions	1164	5
Sergei Pyzhianov	50 m free pistol	564	6
Aleksandr Sokolov	Skeet	194	11
Igor Sokolov	50 m running target	589	1st place, gold medalist(s)
Vladas Turla	25 m rapid fire pistol	595	4
Viktor Vlasov	50 m rifle three positions	1173	1st place, gold medalist(s)
Rustam Yambulatov	Trap	196 (+24 +25)	2nd place, silver medalist(s)

== Swimming ==
Men

Athlete	Event	Heat		Semifinal		Final	
Athlete	Event	Time	Rank	Time	Rank	Time	Rank
Aleksandr Buchenkov	200 m butterfly	2:03.98	10	—N/a		Did not advance	
Aleksandr Chayev	1500 m freestyle	15:20.68	3 Q	—N/a		15:14.30	2nd place, silver medalist(s)
Vladimir Dolgov	100 m backstroke	57.87	2 Q	58.04	7 Q	57.63	3rd place, bronze medalist(s)
Vladimir Dolgov	200 m backstroke	2:05.11	9	—N/a		Did not advance	
Aleksandr Fedorovsky	100 m breaststroke	1:03.86	2 Q	—N/a		1:04.00	4
Sergey Fesenko	200 m butterfly	2:00.20	1 Q	—N/a		1:59.76	1st place, gold medalist(s)
Sergey Fesenko	400 m individual medley	4:28.18	5 Q	—N/a		4:23.43	2nd place, silver medalist(s)
Mikhail Gorelik	200 m butterfly	2:03.15	8 Q	—N/a		2:02.44	5
Sergei Kiselyov	100 m butterfly	56.56	13 Q	56.52	13	Did not advance	
Sergey Koplyakov	100 m freestyle	52.08	5 Q	51.51	4 Q	51.34	4
Sergey Koplyakov	200 m freestyle	1:51.04	1 Q	—N/a		1:49.91	1st place, gold medalist(s)
Sergey Krasyuk	100 m freestyle	52.08	5 Q	51.81	6 Q	51.80	6
Andrey Krylov	200 m freestyle	1:51.21	2 Q	—N/a		1:50.76	2nd place, silver medalist(s)
Andrey Krylov	400 m freestyle	3:54.79	2 Q	—N/a		3:53.24	2nd place, silver medalist(s)
Viktor Kuznetsov	100 m backstroke	58.47	12 Q	56.75	1 Q	56.99	2nd place, silver medalist(s)
Viktor Kuznetsov	200 m backstroke	2:05.14	11	—N/a		Did not advance	
Aleksey Markovsky	100 m butterfly	56.45	12 Q	55.69	8 Q	55.70	8
Arsens Miskarovs	100 m breaststroke	1:04.06	3 Q	—N/a		1:03.82	2nd place, silver medalist(s)
Arsens Miskarovs	200 m breaststroke	2:19.57	2 Q	—N/a		2:17.28	3rd place, bronze medalist(s)
Eduard Petrov	1500 m freestyle	15:32.32	8 Q	—N/a		15:28.24	8
Vladimir Salnikov	400 m freestyle	3:54.54	1 Q	—N/a		3:51.31	1st place, gold medalist(s)
Vladimir Salnikov	1500 m freestyle	15:08.25	1 Q	—N/a		14:58.27	1st place, gold medalist(s)
Yevgeny Seredin	100 m butterfly	55.83	4 Q	55.62	5 Q	55.35	5
Aleksandr Sidorenko	400 m individual medley	4:28.02	4 Q	—N/a		4:22.89	1st place, gold medalist(s)
Vladimir Shemetov	100 m backstroke	59.01	18	Did not advance			
Vladimir Shemetov	200 m backstroke	2:04.20	4 Q	—N/a		2:03.48	4
Vladimir Shemetov	400 m individual medley	4:34.01	15	—N/a		Did not advance	
Sergey Smiryagin	100 m freestyle	52.21	10 Q	52.18	11	Did not advance	
Ivar Stukolkin	200 m freestyle	1:53.44	12	—N/a		Did not advance	
Ivar Stukolkin	400 m freestyle	3:56.60	5 Q	—N/a		3:53.95	3rd place, bronze medalist(s)
Gennady Utenkov	200 m breaststroke	2:21.17	5 Q	—N/a		2:19.64	4
Robertas Žulpa	100 m breaststroke	1:06.23	13	—N/a		Did not advance	
Robertas Žulpa	200 m breaststroke	2:17.83	1 Q	—N/a		2:15.85	1st place, gold medalist(s)
Sergey Kopliakov; Vladimir Salnikov; Ivar Stukolkin; Andrey Krylov; Sergey Rusin*; Sergey Krasyuk*; Yuri Presekin*	4 × 200 m freestyle relay	7:29.39	1 Q	—N/a		7:23.50	1st place, gold medalist(s)
Viktor Kuznetsov; Arsens Miskarovs; Yevgeny Seredin; Sergey Kopliakov; Vladimir Shemetov*; Aleksandr Fedorovsky*; Aleksey Markovsky*; Sergey Krasyuk*	4 × 100 m medley relay	3:48.83	1 Q	—N/a		3:45.92	2nd place, silver medalist(s)

Women

Athlete	Event	Heat		Final	
Athlete	Event	Time	Rank	Time	Rank
Irina Aksyonova	200 m freestyle	2:03.63	7 Q	2:04.00	8
Irina Aksyonova	400 m freestyle	4:14.39	5 Q	4:14.40	5
Irina Aksyonova	800 m freestyle	8:44.42	4 Q	8:38.05	4
Yuliya Bogdanova	100 m breaststroke	1:15.04	16	Did not advance	
Yuliya Bogdanova	200 m breaststroke	2:33.45	4 Q	2:32.39	3rd place, bronze medalist(s)
Larisa Gorchakova	100 m backstroke	1:03.82	5 Q	1:03.87	6
Larisa Gorchakova	200 m backstroke	2:16.68	7 Q	2:17.72	8
Alla Grishchenkova	100 m butterfly	1:04.10	15	Did not advance	
Alla Grishchenkova	200 m butterfly	2:16.01	7 Q	2:15.70	8
Yelena Ivanova	800 m freestyle	8:47.33	8 Q	8:46.45	8
Lina Kačiušytė	100 m breaststroke	1:12.71	7 Q	1:12.21	7
Lina Kačiušytė	200 m breaststroke	2:33.04	3 Q	2:29.54	1st place, gold medalist(s)
Olga Klevakina	100 m freestyle	57.62	6 Q	57.40	4
Olga Klevakina	200 m freestyle	2:02.36	4 Q	2:02.29	4
Olga Klevakina	400 m freestyle	4:18.13	8 Q	4:19.18	8
Olga Klevakina	400 m individual medley	4:55.99	7 Q	4:50.91	7
Oksana Komissarova	400 m freestyle	4:18.61	9	Did not advance	
Oksana Komissarova	800 m freestyle	8:45.80	6 Q	8:42.04	5
Yelena Kruglova	100 m backstroke	1:04.63	11	Did not advance	
Yelena Kruglova	200 m backstroke	2:22.41	15	Did not advance	
Larisa Polivoda	100 m butterfly	1:04.50	18	Did not advance	
Larisa Polivoda	200 m butterfly	2:17.99	13	Did not advance	
Natalya Strunnikova	100 m freestyle	57.43	4 Q	57.83	6
Natalya Strunnikova	200 m freestyle	2:03.36	6 Q	2:03.74	7
Larisa Tsaryova	100 m freestyle	59.12	15	Did not advance	
Svetlana Varganova	200 m breaststroke	2:29.77	1 Q	2:29.61	2nd place, silver medalist(s)
Elvira Vasilkova	100 m breaststroke	1:11.03	2 Q	1:10.41	2nd place, silver medalist(s)
Irina Gerasimova; Natalya Strunnikova; Larisa Tsaryova; Olga Klevakina	4 × 100 m freestyle relay	DSQ		Did not advance	
Yelena Kruglova; Elvira Vasilkova; Alla Grishchenkova; Natalya Strunnikova; Irina Aksyonova*; Olga Klevakina*	4 × 100 m medley relay	4:16.46	3 Q	4:13.61	3rd place, bronze medalist(s)

== Volleyball ==
Summary

Team	Event	Preliminary round					Semifinals / Pl	Final / BM / Pl	
Team	Event	Opposition Score	Opposition Score	Opposition Score	Opposition Score	Rank	Opposition Score	Opposition Score	Rank
Soviet Union men's	Men's tournament	Czechoslovakia; W 3–1	(International Olympic Committee) Italy; W 3–0	Bulgaria; W 3–0	Cuba; W 3–0	1 Q	Romania; W 3–0	Bulgaria; W 3–1	1st place, gold medalist(s)
Soviet Union women's	Women's tournament	Peru; W 3–1	East Germany; W 3–1	Cuba; W 3–0	—N/a	1 Q	Hungary; W 3–0	East Germany; W 3–1	1st place, gold medalist(s)

Men's roster
- Yury Panchenko
- Vyacheslav Zaytsev
- Aleksandr Savin
- Vladimir Dorokhov
- Aleksandr Yermilov
- Valeriy Kryvov
- Pāvels Seļivanovs
- Oleg Moliboga
- Vladimir Kondra
- Vladimir Chernyshov
- Fedir Lashchonov
- Viljar Loor

Women's roster
- Nadezhda Radzevich
- Nataliya Razumova
- Olga Solovova
- Yelena Akhaminova
- Larisa Pavlova
- Yelena Andreyuk
- Irina Makogonova
- Lyubov Kozyreva
- Svetlana Nikishina
- Lyudmila Chernyshyova
- Svetlana Badulina
- Lidiya Loginova

== Water polo ==
Summary

Team	Preliminary round				Final round					
Team	Opposition Score	Opposition Score	Opposition Score	Rank	Opposition Score	Opposition Score	Opposition Score	Opposition Score	Opposition Score	Rank
Soviet Union men's	(International Olympic Committee) Italy; W 8–6	(International Olympic Committee) Spain; W 4–3	Sweden; W 12–1	1 Q	Hungary; W 5–4	(International Olympic Committee) Spain; W 6–2	Cuba; W 8–5	(International Olympic Committee) Netherlands; W 7–3	Yugoslavia; W 8–7	1st place, gold medalist(s)

Team roster
- Evgeni Sharonov
- Sergei Kotenko
- Vladimir Akimov
- Yevgeny Grishin
- Mait Riisman
- Aleksandr Kabanov
- Aleksei Barkalov
- Erkin Shagaev
- Georgi Mshvenieradze
- Mikhail Ivanov
- Viacheslav Sobchenko

== Weightlifting ==
Athlete	Event	Snatch		Clean & Jerk		Total	Rank
Athlete	Event	Result	Rank	Result	Rank	Total	Rank
Kanybek Osmonaliyev	52 kg	107.5	4	137.5	1	245.0	1st place, gold medalist(s)
Yurik Sarkisyan	56 kg	112.5	6	157.5	1	270.0	2nd place, silver medalist(s)
Viktor Mazin	60 kg	130.0	1	160.0	2	290.0	1st place, gold medalist(s)
Aleksandr Pervi	75 kg	157.5	3	200.0	1	357.5	2nd place, silver medalist(s)
Yurik Vardanyan	82.5 kg	177.5	1	222.5	1	400.0	1st place, gold medalist(s)
David Rigert	90 kg	—	—	—	—	—	—
Igor Nikitin	100 kg	177.5	2	215.0	3	392.5	2nd place, silver medalist(s)
Leonid Taranenko	110 kg	182.5	2	240.0	1	422.5	1st place, gold medalist(s)
Vasily Alekseyev	+110 kg	—	—	—	—	—	—
Sultan Rakhmanov	+110 kg	195.0	1	245.0	1	440.0	1st place, gold medalist(s)

== Medals by republic ==
In the following table for team events number of team representatives, who received medals are counted, not "one medal for all the team", as usual. Because there were people from different republics in one team.

Rank	Republic	Gold	Silver	Bronze	Total
1	Russian SFSR	102	69	81	252
2	Ukrainian SSR	34	21	17	72
3	Byelorussian SSR	7	10	7	24
4	Lithuanian SSR	7	1	3	11
5	Georgian SSR	6	4	3	13
6	Tajik SSR	6	0	2	8
7	Kirghiz SSR	4	3	2	9
8	Kazakh SSR	4	2	1	7
9	Estonian SSR	4	0	2	6
10	Latvian SSR	2	7	2	11
11	Armenian SSR	2	3	4	9
12	Uzbek SSR	2	1	1	4
13	Turkmen SSR	1	1	1	3
14	Moldavian SSR	1	0	0	1
15	Azerbaijan SSR	0	3	0	3
Totals (15 entries)		182	125	126	433
