= Soviet Union women's national field hockey team =

Women's national field hockey team representing Soviet Union

Soviet Union
- Association: Federation of bandy and field hockey USSR
- Confederation: EHF (Europe)

Olympic Games
- Appearances: 1 (first in 1980)
- Best result: (bronze) 3rd (1980)

World Cup
- Appearances: 3 (first in 1981)
- Best result: (bronze) 3rd (1981)

European Championship
- Appearances: 3 (first in 1984)
- Best result: (silver) 2nd (1984)
Medal record
Event	1st	2nd	3rd
Olympic Games	0	0	1
World Cup	0	0	1
European Championship	0	1	2
Friendship Games	1	0	0
Total	1	1	4
Olympic Games
Bronze medal – third place	1980 Moscow	Team
World Cup
Bronze medal – third place	1981 Buenos Aires	
European Championship
Silver medal – second place	1984 Lille	
Bronze medal – third place	1987 London	
Bronze medal – third place	1991 Brussels	
Friendship Games
Gold medal – first place	1984 Poznań	Team

The Soviet Union women's national field hockey team represented the Soviet Union in women's international field hockey and was controlled by the Federation of bandy and field hockey USSR, the governing body for field hockey in the Soviet Union.

== Tournament record ==
=== Summer Olympics ===
- 1980 – (bronze)

=== World Cup ===
- 1981 – (bronze)
- 1983 – 10th place
- 1986 – 8th place

=== European Championship ===
- 1984 – (silver)
- 1987 – (bronze)
- 1991 – (bronze)

=== Friendship Games ===
- 1984 – (gold)

== Past squads ==
=== 1980 Olympic Games ===
- Valentina Zazdravnykh
- Tatyana Shvyganova
- Galina Vyuzhanina
- Tatyana Yembakhtova
- Alina Kham
- Natella Krasnikova
- Nadezhda Ovechkina
- Nelli Gorbyatkova
- Yelena Guryeva
- Galina Inzhuvatova
- Nadezhda Filippova
- Lyudmila Frolova
- Lidiya Glubokova
- Leyla Akhmerova
- Natalia Buzunova
- Natalia Bykova

== See also ==
- Russia women's national field hockey team
- Soviet Union men's national field hockey team
