= Volleyball at the 1980 Summer Olympics – Women's tournament =

Women's volleyball at the Games of the XXII Olympiad
- Venue: Minor Arena; Druzhba Multipurpose Arena
- Date: 21–29 July
- Competitors: 96 from 8 nations

Medalists
1st place, gold medalist(s)		Soviet Union (3rd title)
2nd place, silver medalist(s)		East Germany
3rd place, bronze medalist(s)		Bulgaria

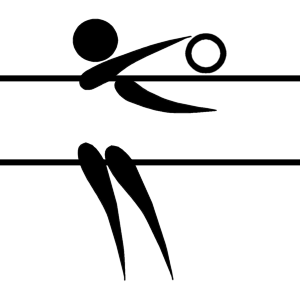

The 1980 Women's Olympic Volleyball Tournament was the 5th edition of the event, organized by the world's governing body, the FIVB in conjunction with the IOC. It was held in Moscow, Soviet Union from 21 to 29 July 1980.

== Qualification ==
Qualifiers	Date	Host	Vacancies	Qualified
Host Country	23 October 1974	(Austria) Vienna	1	Soviet Union
1976 Olympic Games	19–30 July 1976	(Canada) Montréal	~~1~~	~~Japan~~
1978 World Championship	25 Aug. – 7 Sep. 1978	(Soviet Union) Leningrad	1	Cuba
1979 Asian Championsnip	7–14 December 1979	Hong Kong	~~1~~	~~China~~
1979 NORCECA Championship	22-29 April 1979	(Cuba) Havana	~~1~~	~~United States~~
1979 South American Championship	22-26 April 1979	Argentina	1	Peru
1979 European Championship	5–13 October 1979	(France) Lyon	1	East Germany
World Qualifier	20-24 January 1980	(Bulgaria) Pazardzhik	1	Romania
Wildcards replacing boycotting nations*	20-24 January 1980	(Bulgaria) Pazardzhik	3	Brazil*
Wildcards replacing boycotting nations*	20-24 January 1980	(Bulgaria) Pazardzhik	3	Bulgaria*
Wildcards replacing boycotting nations*	20-24 January 1980	(Bulgaria) Pazardzhik	3	Hungary*
Total			8	

* Notes:

1. United States was the 1979 NORCECA Championship runners-up (champions Cuba, were already qualified as World champions), but together with China (1979 Asian champion), Japan (1976 Olympic champion) and other countries, boycotted the games.
2. Brazil, Bulgaria and Hungary replaced China, Japan and the United States.

== Format ==
The tournament was played in two different stages. In the Preliminary round (first stage), the eight participants were divided into two pools of four teams. A single round-robin format was played within each pool to determine the teams position in the pool. The Final round (second stage) was played in a single elimination format, where the preliminary round two highest ranked teams in each group advanced to the semifinals and the two lowest ranked teams advanced to the 5th–8th place semifinals.

== Pools composition ==
Pool A	Pool B
Soviet Union	Bulgaria
Peru	Romania
Cuba	Hungary
East Germany	Brazil

== Venues ==
- Minor Arena, Moscow, Soviet Union
- Druzhba Multipurpose Arena, Moscow, Soviet Union

== Preliminary round ==
=== Group A ===
Pos	Team	Pld	W	L	Pts	SW	SL	SR	SPW	SPL	SPR	Qualification
1	Soviet Union	3	3	0	6	9	2	4.500	153	99	1.545	1st–4th semifinals
2	East Germany	3	2	1	5	7	6	1.167	166	160	1.038	1st–4th semifinals
3	Cuba	3	1	2	4	4	6	0.667	117	117	1.000	5th–8th semifinals
4	Peru	3	0	3	3	3	9	0.333	108	168	0.643	5th–8th semifinals

Date		Score		Set 1	Set 2	Set 3	Set 4	Set 5	Total	Report
21 Jul	East Germany	3–1	Cuba	15–11	15–13	10–15	15–4		55–43	Report
21 Jul	Soviet Union	3–1	Peru	15–2	7–15	15–4	15–9		52–30	Report
23 Jul	Peru	0–3	Cuba	6–15	5–15	6–15			17–45	Report
23 Jul	Soviet Union	3–1	East Germany	15–5	10–15	16–14	15–6		56–40	Report
25 Jul	Peru	2–3	East Germany	10–15	17–15	15–11	10–15	9–15	61–71	Report
25 Jul	Soviet Union	3–0	Cuba	15–6	15–13	15–10			45–29	Report

=== Group B ===
Pos	Team	Pld	W	L	Pts	SW	SL	SR	SPW	SPL	SPR	Qualification
1	Bulgaria	3	2	1	5	7	4	1.750	138	114	1.211	1st–4th semifinals
2	Hungary	3	2	1	5	8	6	1.333	161	170	0.947	1st–4th semifinals
3	Romania	3	2	1	5	7	7	1.000	157	153	1.026	5th–8th semifinals
4	Brazil	3	0	3	3	4	9	0.444	152	171	0.889	5th–8th semifinals

Date		Score		Set 1	Set 2	Set 3	Set 4	Set 5	Total	Report
21 Jul	Bulgaria	3–1	Romania	15–9	7–15	15–5	15–4		52–33	Report
21 Jul	Hungary	3–2	Brazil	17–15	9–15	15–12	6–15	15–12	62–69	Report
23 Jul	Hungary	2–3	Romania	15–5	3–15	5–15	15–10	8–15	46–60	Report
23 Jul	Bulgaria	3–0	Brazil	15–7	15–9	15–12			45–28	Report
25 Jul	Brazil	2–3	Romania	15–10	15–9	6–15	13–15	6–15	55–64	Report
25 Jul	Bulgaria	1–3	Hungary	15–8	9–15	7–15	10–15		41–53	Report

== Final round ==
=== 5th–8th place ===
- venue: Druzhba Multipurpose Arena.
- All times are Moscow Summer Time (MSD) (UTC+04:00).

5-8th place
27 July
Peru	3
Romania	0
27 July
Cuba	3
Brazil	0

5th place
29 July
Cuba	3
Peru	1
7th place
29 July
Romania	0
Brazil	3

==== 5th–8th place semifinals ====
Date	Time		Score		Set 1	Set 2	Set 3	Set 4	Set 5	Total	Report
27 Jul	17:30	Peru	3–0	Romania	15–12	15–9	15–11			45–32	Report
27 Jul	19:30	Cuba	3–0	Brazil	15–2	15–5	15–6			45–13	Report

==== 7th place match ====
Date	Time		Score		Set 1	Set 2	Set 3	Set 4	Set 5	Total	Report
29 Jul	16:00	Romania	0–3	Brazil	8–15	12–15	12–15			32–45	Report

==== 5th place match ====
Date	Time		Score		Set 1	Set 2	Set 3	Set 4	Set 5	Total	Report
29 Jul	18:00	Cuba	3–1	Peru	15–9	15–7	12–15	15–5		57–36	Report

=== Final ===
- venue: Minor Arena.
- All times are Moscow Summer Time (MSD) (UTC+04:00).

Semi-finals
27 July
Soviet Union	3
Hungary	0
27 July
East Germany	3
Bulgaria	2

Final
29 July
Soviet Union	3
East Germany	1
Third place
29 July
Bulgaria	3
Hungary	2

==== Semifinals ====
Date	Time		Score		Set 1	Set 2	Set 3	Set 4	Set 5	Total	Report
27 Jul	17:30	East Germany	3–2	Bulgaria	15–10	12–15	15–9	7–15	15–6	64–55	Report
27 Jul	19:30	Soviet Union	3–0	Hungary	15–11	15–13	15–2			45–26	Report

==== Bronze medal match ====
Date	Time		Score		Set 1	Set 2	Set 3	Set 4	Set 5	Total	Report
29 Jul	17:30	Bulgaria	3–2	Hungary	15–5	13–15	6–15	15–4	15–8	64–47	Report

==== Gold medal match ====
Date	Time		Score		Set 1	Set 2	Set 3	Set 4	Set 5	Total	Report
29 Jul	19:30	Soviet Union	3–1	East Germany	15–12	11–15	15–13	15–7		56–47	Report

== Final standing ==
Rank	Team
1st place, gold medalist(s)	Soviet Union
2nd place, silver medalist(s)	East Germany
3rd place, bronze medalist(s)	Bulgaria
4	Hungary
5	Cuba
6	Peru
7	Brazil
8	Romania

1980 Women's Olympic champions

Soviet Union
3rd title

12-woman roster
Nadezhda Radzevich, Nataliya Razumova, Olga Solovova, Yelena Akhaminova, Larisa Pavlova, Yelena Andreyuk, Irina Makogonova, Lyubov Kozyreva, Svetlana Nikishina, Lyudmila Chernyshyova, Svetlana Badulina, Lidiya Loginova
Head coach
Nikolay Karpol

== Medalists ==
Gold	Silver	Bronze
Soviet Union Nadezhda Radzevich; Nataliya Razumova; Olga Solovova; Yelena Akhaminova; Larisa Pavlova; Yelena Andreyuk; Irina Makogonova; Lyubov Kozyreva; Svetlana Nikishina; Lyudmila Chernyshyova; Svetlana Badulina; Lidiya Loginova Head coach: Nikolay Karpol	East Germany Ute Kostrzewa; Andrea Heim; Annette Schultz; Christine Mummhardt; Heike Lehmann; Barbara Czekalla; Karla Roffeis; Martina Schmidt; Anke Westendorf; Karin Püschel; Brigitte Fetzer; Katharina Bullin Head coach: Dieter Grund	Bulgaria Tanya Dimitrova; Valentina Ilieva; Galina Stancheva; Silviya Petrunova; Anka Khristolova; Verka Borisova; Margarita Gerasimova; Rumyana Kaisheva; Maya Georgieva; Tanya Gogova; Tsvetana Bozhurina; Rositsa Dimitrova Head coach: Vasil Simov
