= 1979 Women's European Volleyball Championship =

Tournament details
- Host country: France
- Dates: 5 – 13 October
- Teams: 12
- Venue: Various (in 4 host cities)

Final positions
- Champions: Soviet Union (10th title)

The 1979 Women's European Volleyball Championship was the eleventh edition of the event, organised by Europe's governing volleyball body, the Confédération Européenne de Volleyball. It was hosted in several cities in France from 5 to 13 October 1979, with the final round held in Lyon.

== Participating teams ==
- Belgium
- Bulgaria
- Czechoslovakia
- East Germany
- France
- Hungary
- Netherlands
- Poland
- Romania
- Soviet Union
- West Germany
- Yugoslavia

== Format ==
The tournament was played in two different stages. In the first stage, the twelve participants were divided into three groups of four teams each. In the second stage, two groups were formed, one containing the winners and runners-up from all first stage groups (six teams in total) to contest the tournament title. A second group was formed by the remaining six teams which played for position places (7th to 12th). All groups in both stages played a single round-robin format.

== Pools composition ==
| Pool A | Pool B | Pool C |
|---|---|---|
| Poland | Belgium | France |
| Romania | Bulgaria | Hungary |
| Soviet Union | Czechoslovakia | Netherlands |
| West Germany | East Germany | Yugoslavia |

== Venues ==
| Pool A | Pool B and 7th–12th pool | Tournament host cities |
| Orléans | Cannes | Tournament host cities |
| Pool C | Final pool | Tournament host cities |
| Évreux | Lyon | Tournament host cities |

== Preliminary round ==
=== Pool A ===
- venue location: Orléans, France

| Pos | Team | Pld | W | L | Pts | SW | SL | SR | SPW | SPL | SPR | Qualification |
|---|---|---|---|---|---|---|---|---|---|---|---|---|
| 1 | Romania | 3 | 2 | 1 | 5 | 8 | 4 | 2.000 | 157 | 134 | 1.172 | Final pool |
| 2 | Soviet Union | 3 | 2 | 1 | 5 | 8 | 5 | 1.600 | 177 | 137 | 1.292 | Final pool |
| 3 | Poland | 3 | 2 | 1 | 5 | 6 | 6 | 1.000 | 142 | 138 | 1.029 | 7th–12th pool |
| 4 | West Germany | 3 | 0 | 3 | 3 | 2 | 9 | 0.222 | 93 | 160 | 0.581 | 7th–12th pool |

| Date | | Score | | Set 1 | Set 2 | Set 3 | Set 4 | Set 5 | Total | Report |
|---|---|---|---|---|---|---|---|---|---|---|
| 5 Oct | Poland | 3–1 | West Germany | 15–6 | 15–1 | 13–15 | 15–7 | | 58–29 | Report |
| 5 Oct | Soviet Union | 3–2 | Romania | 15–5 | 15–12 | 11–15 | 12–15 | 15–8 | 68–55 | Report |
| 6 Oct | Romania | 3–1 | West Germany | 15–7 | 12–15 | 15–11 | 15–12 | | 57–45 | Report |
| 6 Oct | Poland | 3–2 | Soviet Union | 15–10 | 6–15 | 15–12 | 12–15 | 15–12 | 63–64 | Report |
| 7 Oct | Soviet Union | 3–0 | West Germany | 15–6 | 15–2 | 15–11 | | | 45–19 | Report |
| 7 Oct | Romania | 3–0 | Poland | 15–5 | 15–6 | 15–10 | | | 45–21 | Report |

=== Pool B ===
- venue location: Cannes, France

| Pos | Team | Pld | W | L | Pts | SW | SL | SR | SPW | SPL | SPR | Qualification |
|---|---|---|---|---|---|---|---|---|---|---|---|---|
| 1 | East Germany | 3 | 3 | 0 | 6 | 9 | 1 | 9.000 | 149 | 77 | 1.935 | Final pool |
| 2 | Bulgaria | 3 | 2 | 1 | 5 | 6 | 3 | 2.000 | 115 | 83 | 1.386 | Final pool |
| 3 | Czechoslovakia | 3 | 1 | 2 | 4 | 4 | 6 | 0.667 | 114 | 125 | 0.912 | 7th–12th pool |
| 4 | Belgium | 3 | 0 | 3 | 3 | 0 | 9 | 0.000 | 42 | 135 | 0.311 | 7th–12th pool |

| Date | | Score | | Set 1 | Set 2 | Set 3 | Set 4 | Set 5 | Total | Report |
|---|---|---|---|---|---|---|---|---|---|---|
| 5 Oct | East Germany | 3–0 | Belgium | 15–1 | 15–5 | 15–3 | | | 45–9 | Report |
| 5 Oct | Bulgaria | 3–0 | Czechoslovakia | 15–5 | 15–10 | 15–11 | | | 45–26 | Report |
| 6 Oct | Bulgaria | 3–0 | Belgium | 15–4 | 15–4 | 15–3 | | | 45–11 | Report |
| 6 Oct | East Germany | 3–1 | Czechoslovakia | 15–6 | 15–13 | 13–15 | 15–9 | | 58–43 | Report |
| 7 Oct | East Germany | 3–0 | Bulgaria | 15–3 | 16–14 | 15–8 | | | 46–25 | Report |
| 7 Oct | Czechoslovakia | 3–0 | Belgium | 15–7 | 15–10 | 15–5 | | | 45–22 | Report |

=== Pool C ===
- venue location: Évreux, France

| Pos | Team | Pld | W | L | Pts | SW | SL | SR | SPW | SPL | SPR | Qualification |
|---|---|---|---|---|---|---|---|---|---|---|---|---|
| 1 | Hungary | 3 | 3 | 0 | 6 | 9 | 3 | 3.000 | 167 | 111 | 1.505 | Final pool |
| 2 | Netherlands | 3 | 2 | 1 | 5 | 8 | 4 | 2.000 | 160 | 136 | 1.176 | Final pool |
| 3 | Yugoslavia | 3 | 1 | 2 | 4 | 5 | 7 | 0.714 | 121 | 136 | 0.890 | 7th–12th pool |
| 4 | France | 3 | 0 | 3 | 3 | 1 | 9 | 0.111 | 79 | 144 | 0.549 | 7th–12th pool |

| Date | | Score | | Set 1 | Set 2 | Set 3 | Set 4 | Set 5 | Total | Report |
|---|---|---|---|---|---|---|---|---|---|---|
| 5 Oct | Yugoslavia | 1–3 | Hungary | 15–8 | 3–15 | 3–15 | 12–15 | | 33–53 | Report |
| 5 Oct | Netherlands | 3–0 | France | 15–11 | 15–9 | 15–13 | | | 45–33 | Report |
| 6 Oct | Yugoslavia | 3–1 | France | 15–4 | 15–5 | 9–15 | 15–6 | | 54–30 | Report |
| 6 Oct | Hungary | 3–2 | Netherlands | 16–18 | 15–13 | 15–9 | 8–15 | 15–7 | 69–62 | Report |
| 7 Oct | Yugoslavia | 1–3 | Netherlands | 3–15 | 15–8 | 8–15 | 8–15 | | 34–53 | Report |
| 7 Oct | Hungary | 3–0 | France | 15–7 | 15–3 | 15–6 | | | 45–16 | Report |

== Final round ==
=== 7th–12th pool ===
- venue location: Cannes, France

| Pos | Team | Pld | W | L | Pts | SW | SL | SR | SPW | SPL | SPR |
|---|---|---|---|---|---|---|---|---|---|---|---|
| 1 | Czechoslovakia | 5 | 5 | 0 | 10 | 15 | 0 | MAX | 226 | 125 | 1.808 |
| 2 | Poland | 5 | 4 | 1 | 9 | 12 | 5 | 2.400 | 231 | 153 | 1.510 |
| 3 | West Germany | 5 | 3 | 2 | 8 | 10 | 8 | 1.250 | 201 | 200 | 1.005 |
| 4 | Yugoslavia | 5 | 2 | 3 | 7 | 7 | 10 | 0.700 | 202 | 198 | 1.020 |
| 5 | France | 5 | 1 | 4 | 6 | 5 | 14 | 0.357 | 184 | 254 | 0.724 |
| 6 | Belgium | 5 | 0 | 5 | 5 | 3 | 15 | 0.200 | 146 | 260 | 0.562 |

| Date | | Score | | Set 1 | Set 2 | Set 3 | Set 4 | Set 5 | Total | Report |
|---|---|---|---|---|---|---|---|---|---|---|
| 9 Oct | Poland | 3–1 | West Germany | 15–6 | 15–1 | 13–15 | 15–7 | | 58–29 | Report |
| 9 Oct | Czechoslovakia | 3–0 | Belgium | 15–7 | 15–10 | 15–5 | | | 45–22 | Report |
| 9 Oct | Yugoslavia | 3–1 | France | 15–4 | 15–5 | 9–15 | 15–6 | | 54–30 | Report |
| 10 Oct | Yugoslavia | 0–3 | Czechoslovakia | 11–15 | 14–16 | 6–15 | | | 31–46 | Report |
| 10 Oct | Poland | 3–1 | France | 15–12 | 15–7 | 9–15 | 15–4 | | 54–38 | Report |
| 10 Oct | West Germany | 3–1 | Belgium | 15–7 | 9–15 | 15–4 | 15–1 | | 54–27 | Report |
| 11 Oct | Yugoslavia | 0–3 | Poland | 11–15 | 10–15 | 6–15 | | | 27–45 | Report |
| 11 Oct | Czechoslovakia | 3–0 | West Germany | 15–7 | 15–13 | 15–3 | | | 45–23 | Report |
| 11 Oct | France | 3–2 | Belgium | 14–16 | 15–9 | 15–4 | 12–15 | 15–12 | 71–56 | Report |
| 12 Oct | Yugoslavia | 1–3 | West Germany | 11–15 | 15–5 | 11–15 | 8–15 | | 45–50 | Report |
| 12 Oct | Poland | 3–0 | Belgium | 15–5 | 15–4 | 15–5 | | | 45–14 | Report |
| 12 Oct | Czechoslovakia | 3–0 | France | 15–7 | 15–0 | 15–13 | | | 45–20 | Report |
| 13 Oct | Yugoslavia | 3–0 | Belgium | 15–9 | 15–7 | 15–11 | | | 45–27 | Report |
| 13 Oct | Czechoslovakia | 3–0 | Poland | 15–11 | 15–13 | 15–5 | | | 45–29 | Report |
| 13 Oct | West Germany | 3–0 | France | 15–5 | 15–9 | 15–11 | | | 45–25 | Report |

=== Final pool ===
- venue location: Lyon, France

| Pos | Team | Pld | W | L | Pts | SW | SL | SR | SPW | SPL | SPR |
|---|---|---|---|---|---|---|---|---|---|---|---|
| 1 | Soviet Union | 5 | 5 | 0 | 10 | 15 | 5 | 3.000 | 279 | 187 | 1.492 |
| 2 | East Germany | 5 | 4 | 1 | 9 | 12 | 4 | 3.000 | 209 | 136 | 1.537 |
| 3 | Bulgaria | 5 | 3 | 2 | 8 | 11 | 8 | 1.375 | 240 | 210 | 1.143 |
| 4 | Hungary | 5 | 2 | 3 | 7 | 10 | 11 | 0.909 | 251 | 269 | 0.933 |
| 5 | Romania | 5 | 1 | 4 | 6 | 5 | 14 | 0.357 | 189 | 261 | 0.724 |
| 6 | Netherlands | 5 | 0 | 5 | 5 | 4 | 15 | 0.267 | 171 | 276 | 0.620 |

| Date | | Score | | Set 1 | Set 2 | Set 3 | Set 4 | Set 5 | Total | Report |
|---|---|---|---|---|---|---|---|---|---|---|
| 9 Oct | Soviet Union | 3–2 | Romania | 15–5 | 15–12 | 11–15 | 12–15 | 15–8 | 68–55 | Report |
| 9 Oct | East Germany | 3–0 | Bulgaria | 15–3 | 16–14 | 15–8 | | | 46–25 | Report |
| 9 Oct | Hungary | 3–2 | Netherlands | 16–18 | 15–13 | 15–9 | 8–15 | 15–7 | 69–62 | Report |
| 10 Oct | Hungary | 3–0 | Romania | 16–14 | 15–11 | 15–8 | | | 46–33 | Report |
| 10 Oct | Soviet Union | 3–2 | Bulgaria | 15–10 | 15–7 | 10–15 | 9–15 | 15–11 | 64–58 | Report |
| 10 Oct | East Germany | 3–0 | Netherlands | 15–7 | 15–4 | 15–6 | | | 45–17 | Report |
| 11 Oct | Soviet Union | 3–1 | Hungary | 18–16 | 15–6 | 9–15 | 15–8 | | 57–45 | Report |
| 11 Oct | Bulgaria | 3–0 | Netherlands | 17–15 | 15–6 | 15–6 | | | 47–27 | Report |
| 11 Oct | East Germany | 3–0 | Romania | 15–3 | 15–5 | 15–3 | | | 45–11 | Report |
| 12 Oct | Soviet Union | 3–0 | Netherlands | 15–6 | 15–1 | 15–1 | | | 45–8 | Report |
| 12 Oct | East Germany | 3–1 | Hungary | 15–4 | 15–6 | 7–15 | 15–13 | | 52–38 | Report |
| 12 Oct | Bulgaria | 3–0 | Romania | 15–4 | 15–10 | 15–6 | | | 45–20 | Report |
| 13 Oct | Romania | 3–2 | Netherlands | 15–12 | 12–15 | 13–15 | 15–5 | 15–10 | 70–57 | Report |
| 13 Oct | Bulgaria | 3–2 | Hungary | 9–15 | 11–15 | 15–3 | 15–10 | 15–10 | 65–53 | Report |
| 13 Oct | Soviet Union | 3–0 | East Germany | 15–9 | 15–5 | 15–7 | | | 45–21 | Report |

== Final ranking ==
| Place | Team |
|---|---|
| 1st place, gold medalist(s) | Soviet Union |
| 2nd place, silver medalist(s) | East Germany |
| 3rd place, bronze medalist(s) | Bulgaria |
| 4. | Hungary |
| 5. | Romania |
| 6. | Netherlands |
| 7. | Czechoslovakia |
| 8. | Poland |
| 9. | West Germany |
| 10. | Yugoslavia |
| 11. | France |
| 12. | Belgium |

| Qualified for the 1980 Olympic Games as hosts |
| Qualified for the 1980 Olympic Games |

1979 Women's European champions

Soviet Union
Tenth title

Team Roster
Lyudmila Chernyshyova, Nadezhda Radzevich, Lidiya Loginova, Tatyana Cherkasova, Irina Makogonova, Lyubov Kozyreva, Yelena Andreyuk, Yelena Akhaminova, Svetlana Nikishina, Nataliya Razumova and Tatyana Kunitskaya.
Head coach: Nikolay Karpol.
