= Russian Hockey Federation =

Russian Hockey Federation may refer to

- Russian Field Hockey Federation
- Ice Hockey Federation of Russia
- Russian Bandy Federation (in Russia, bandy is also called "Russian hockey")
