= Gorbatkov =

Gorbatkov (Russian: Горбатков) is a Russian masculine surname, its feminine counterpart is Gorbatkova. It may refer to

- Dmitry Gorbatkov (born 1981), Kazakhstani volleyball player
- Nelli Gorbatkova (1958–1981), Russian field hockey player
