= Soviet Union national field hockey team =

Soviet Union national field hockey team may refer to:

- Soviet Union men's national field hockey team
- Soviet Union women's national field hockey team
