= Gymnastics at the 1980 Summer Olympics – Men's floor =

Men's floor at the Games of the XXII Olympiad
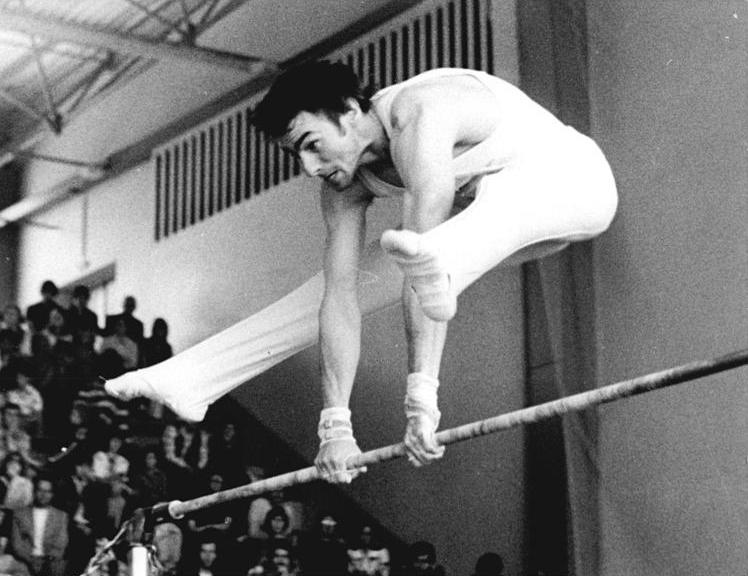
- Gold medalist Roland Brückner (1978)
- Venue: Luzhniki Palace of Sports
- Date: 20–25 July 1980
- Competitors: 65 from 14 nations
- Winning score: 19,750

Medalists
1st place, gold medalist(s)		Roland Brückner; East Germany
2nd place, silver medalist(s)		Nikolai Andrianov; Soviet Union
3rd place, bronze medalist(s)		Aleksandr Dityatin; Soviet Union

These are the results of the men's floor competition, one of eight events for male competitors in artistic gymnastics at the 1980 Summer Olympics in Moscow. The qualification and final rounds took place on July 20, 22 and 25th at the Sports Palace at the Central Lenin Stadium.

== Results ==
=== Qualification ===
Sixty-eight gymnasts competed in the compulsory and optional rounds on July 20 and 22. The six highest scoring gymnasts advanced to the final on July 25. Each country was limited to two competitors in the final. Half of the points earned by each gymnast during both the compulsory and optional rounds carried over to the final. This constitutes the "prelim" score.

=== Final ===
Rank	Gymnast	C	O	Prelim	Final	Total
Gold medal	Roland Brückner (GDR)	9.850	9.850	9.850	9.900	19.750
Silver medal	Nikolai Andrianov (URS)	9.900	9.850	9.875	9.850	19.725
Bronze medal	Alexander Dityatin (URS)	9.800	9.800	9.800	9.900	19.700
4	Jiri Tabak (TCH)	9.850	9.800	9.825	9.850	19.675
5	Peter Kovacs (HUN)	9.750	9.800	9.775	9.650	19.425
6	Lutz Hoffmann (GDR)	9.700	9.750	9.725	9.000	18.725

Preceded by Gymnastics at the 1976 Summer Olympics – Men's floor	Men's Floor Event; 1980	Succeeded by Gymnastics at the 1984 Summer Olympics – Men's floor
