= Bandy and Field Hockey Federation of the USSR =

Former sports governing body

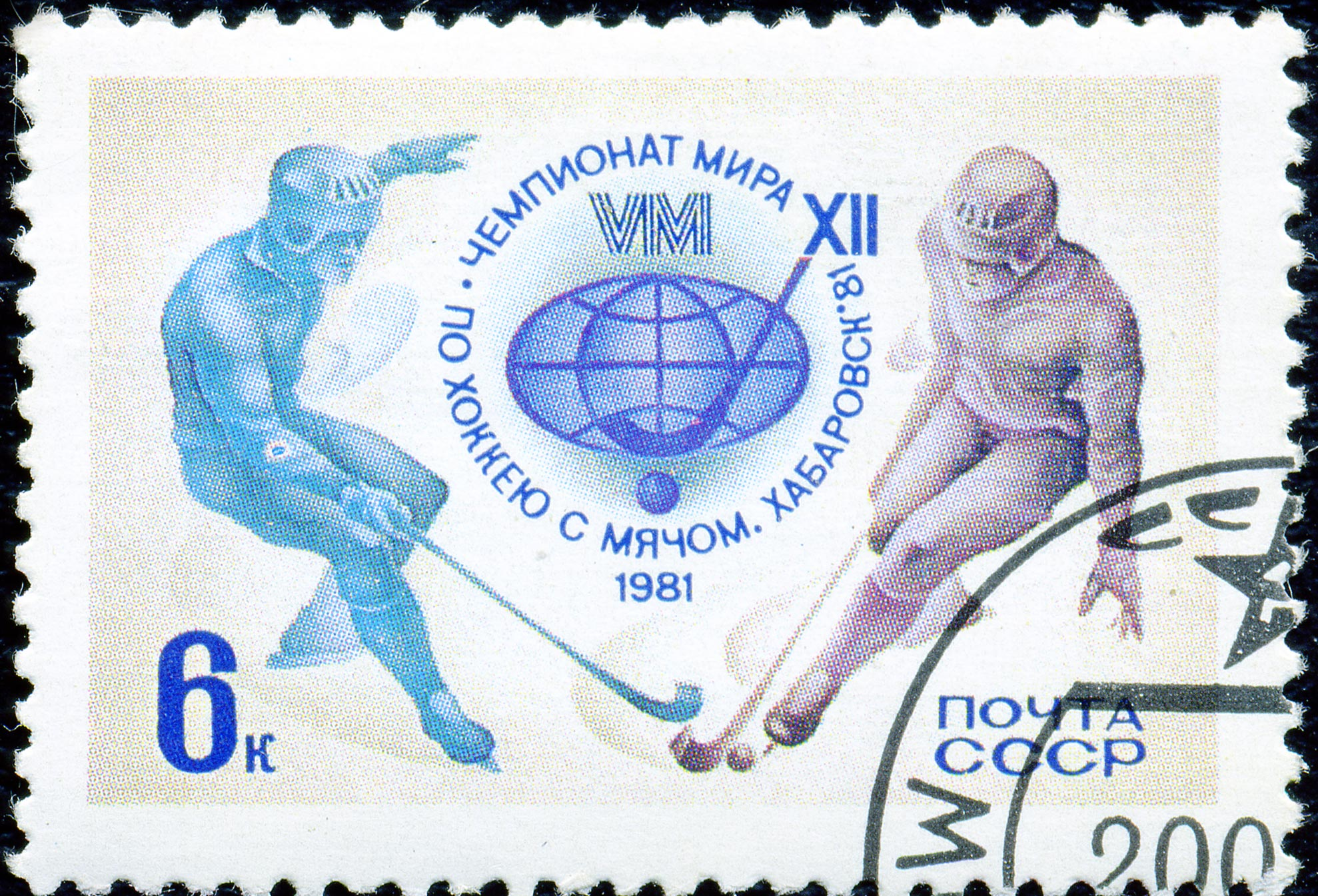
The Soviet Union hosted many Bandy World Championships.

Bandy and Field Hockey Federation of the USSR (Russian: Федерация хоккея с мячом и хоккея на траве СССР) was the governing body for the sports of bandy and field hockey in the Soviet Union. The federation was governing these two sports since 1967, when ice hockey was split off to form the Soviet Union Ice Hockey Federation; ice hockey had only been introduced to the Soviet Union some twenty years earlier.

The federation was one of the founding members of the Federation of International Bandy in 1955.

After the dissolution of the Soviet Union in late 1991, the federation was replaced by the All Russian Bandy Federation in early 1992. For field hockey, the Russian Field Hockey Federation was created in its place.

The following former states of the Soviet Union now have their own bandy federations: Russia (founded in 1992), Kazakhstan (Kazakhstan Bandy Federation, 1993), Belarus (Belarusian Bandy Federation, 1999), Estonia (Estonian Bandy Association, 2002), Kyrgyzstan (Bandy Federation of Kyrgyzstan, 2004), Latvia (Latvia's Bandy Federation, 2006), Ukraine (Ukrainian Bandy and Rink bandy Federation, 2007), and Lithuania (Lithuanian Bandy Association, 2008).

== National teams ==
=== Bandy ===
- Soviet Union men's team
- Soviet Union women's team

=== Field hockey ===
- Soviet Union men's team
- Soviet Union women's team
