= Gymnastics at the 1980 Summer Olympics – Women's vault =

Women's vault at the Games of the XXII Olympiad
- Pictogram for Gymnastics
- Venue: Palace of Sports
- Date: 21 July 1980 (qualifying); 25 July 1980 (final)
- Competitors: 62 from 16 nations
- Winning total: 19.725

Medalists
1st place, gold medalist(s)		Natalia Shaposhnikova	Soviet Union
2nd place, silver medalist(s)		Steffi Kräker	East Germany
3rd place, bronze medalist(s)		Melita Rühn	Romania

These are the results of the women's vault competition, one of six events for female competitors in artistic gymnastics at the 1980 Summer Olympics in Moscow. The qualification and final rounds took place on 21, and 25 July at the Sports Palace of the Central Lenin Stadium.

== Results ==
=== Qualification ===
Sixty-two gymnasts competed in the compulsory and optional rounds on 21 and 23 July. The six highest scoring gymnasts advanced to the final on 25 July. Each country was limited to two competitors in the final. Half of the points earned by each gymnast during both the compulsory and optional rounds carried over to the final. This constitutes the "prelim" score.

=== Final ===
Rank	Gymnast	C	O	Prelim	Final	Total
Gold medal	Natalia Shaposhnikova (URS)	10.000	9.800	9.900	9.825	19.725
Silver medal	Steffi Kräker (GDR)	9.950	9.900	9.925	9.750	19.675
Bronze medal	Melita Rühn (ROU)	9.750	10.000	9.875	9.775	19.650
4	Elena Davydova (URS)	9.900	9.900	9.900	9.675	19.575
5	Nadia Comăneci (ROU)	9.950	9.900	9.925	9.425	19.350
6	Maxi Gnauck (GDR)	9.950	9.900	9.925	9.375	19.300
