= Yelena Akhaminova =

Ukrainian volleyball player

Yelena Sokolovskaya
Personal information
- Full name: Yelena Rabigovna Sokolovskaya (Akhaminova)
- Nationality: Soviet; Ukrainian
- Born: 5 October 1961 (age 65) Sverdlovsk, Russian SFSR, Soviet Union (now Yekaterinburg, Sverdlovsk Oblast, Russia)
- Height: 1.81 m (5 ft 11 in)
- Weight: 80 kg (176 lb)

Volleyball information
- Position: Middle blocker
- Number: 4

Career
- Years: Team
- 1977–1982: Uralochka Sverdlovsk
- 1982–1989: Medin Odesa
- 1989–1993: Haukiputaan Heitto
- 1993–1994: Dinamo-Jinestra Odesa
- 1994–1995: Chemik Police
- 1995–2002: ?
- 2002–2003: Khimik Yuzhne

National team
- Years: Team
- 1979–1983: Soviet Union
Honours
Women's volleyball
Representing the Soviet Union
Olympic Games
Gold medal – first place	1980 Moscow	Team
World Cup
Bronze medal – third place	1981 Japan
European Championship
Gold medal – first place	1979 France
Silver medal – second place	1981 Bulgaria
Silver medal – second place	1983 East Germany
Summer Universiade
Gold medal – first place	1979 Mexico City
European Junior Championships
Gold medal – first place	1979 Yugoslavia

Yelena Rabigovna Sokolovskaya (née Akhaminova) (Russian: Еле́на Раби́говна Соколо́вская (Ахами́нова)) (born 5 October 1961 in Sverdlovsk) is a Soviet Russian-born Ukrainian former volleyball player and coach. As a player for the Soviet Union she is an Olympic gold medallist (in 1980) and European champion (in 1979).

== Playing career ==
Sokolovskaya played from 1977 until 2002 for clubs in the Russian SFSR, Ukrainian SSR, Finland, Post-Soviet Ukraine, and Poland. She won many titles including the CEV Women's Champions League, CEV Cup, USSR Championship, Soviet Cup, Polish Championship and Polish Cup.

She played for the Soviet Union national team at junior and senior level from 1979 to 1983, taking part of the World Championship (in 1982) and becoming Olympic champion (in 1980), World Cup bronze medallist (in 1981), European champion (in 1979) and European silver medallist (in 1981 and in 1983).

=== Clubs ===
- (Russian Soviet Federative Socialist Republic) Uralochka Sverdlovsk (1977–1982)
- (Ukrainian Soviet Socialist Republic) Medin Odesa (1982–1989)
- (Finland) Haukiputaan Heitto (1989–1993)
- (Ukraine) Dinamo-Jinestra Odesa (1993–1994)
- (Poland) Chemik Police (1994–1995)
- ? (1995–2002)
- (Ukraine) Khimik Yuzhne (2002–2003)

== Coaching career ==
In 2006, Sokolovskaya was appointed head coach of Ukrainian women's volleyball club VC Jinestra (previously called Dinamo-Jinestra Odesa). She won twice the Ukrainian Cup and finished four times as runners up of the Ukrainian Super League during her six seasons as coach, before the club folded in 2012.

== Honours and awards ==
=== Individual Achievements ===
- 1980 - Merited Master of Sports of the USSR

=== Team Achievements - Player ===
National team
Junior

- 1979 Women's Junior European Volleyball Championship – Gold medal
- 1979 Summer Universiade – Gold medal

Senior

- 1979 European Championship – Gold medal
- 1980 Olympic Games – Gold medal
- 1981 European Championship – Silver medal
- 1981 World Cup – Bronze medal
- 1983 European Championship – Silver medal

Club

- 1978 USSR Championship - Champion (with Uralochka Sverdlovsk)
- 1979 USSR Championship - Champion (with Uralochka Sverdlovsk)
- 1980 USSR Championship - Champion (with Uralochka Sverdlovsk)
- 1980-81 CEV Champions League - Champion (with Uralochka Sverdlovsk)
- 1981 USSR Championship - Champion (with Uralochka Sverdlovsk)
- 1981–82 CEV Champions League - Champion (with Uralochka Sverdlovsk)
- 1982 USSR Championship - Champion (with Uralochka Sverdlovsk)
- 1983 Soviet Cup - Champion (with Medin Odesa)
- 1983 CEV Cup - Champion (with Medin Odesa)
- 1994-95 Polish Championship - Champion (with Chemik Police)
- 1995 Polish Cup - Champion (with Chemik Police)

=== Team Achievements - Coaching ===
Club

- 2010 Ukrainian Cup - Champion (with Dinamo-Jinestra Odesa)
- 2011 Ukrainian Cup - Champion (with Dinamo-Jinestra Odesa)
