= Natalya Lukyanenko =

Ukrainian handball player (born 1963)

Olympic medal record

Women's Handball
Gold medal – first place	1980 Moscow	Team

Natalya Lukyanenko (Ukrainian: Наталія Миколаївна Лук'яненко; born 14 January 1963 in Kyiv) — is a former Ukrainian handball player who competed in the 1980 Summer Olympics and became Olympic champion. She played in the position of goaltender.

== Career ==
She did not play any single match in the 1980 Olympics.

As player of HC Spartak Kyiv, she won European Champions Cup in the 1980/81 season.
