= Lyudmila Rogozhina =

Ukrainian/Soviet basketball player

Olympic medal record

Women's basketball

Representing the Soviet Union
Gold medal – first place	1980 Moscow	Team competition

Lyudmila Nikolayevna Rogozhina-Muravyova (Russian: Людмила Николаевна Рогожина-Муравьёва; born 27 May 1959 in Dnipropetrovsk, Ukrainian SSR, Soviet Union) is a Ukrainian and Soviet former basketball player who competed in the 1980 Summer Olympics.
