= Larisa Savkina =

Azerbaijani handball player

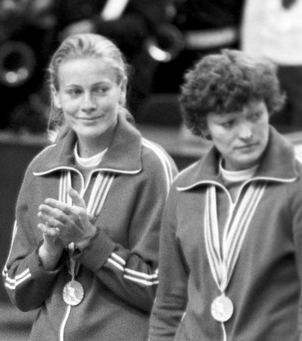
- Savkina (left) at the 1980 Olympics

Personal information
- Born: 8 February 1955 (age 71) Rustavi, Georgia
- Height: 178 cm (70 in)

Sport
- Sport: Handball

Senior clubs
- Years: Team
- –: Automobilist Baku
National team
- Years: Team
- –: Soviet Union
Medal record
Representing the Soviet Union
Olympic Games
Gold medal – first place	1980 Moscow	Team

Larisa Mikhaylovna Savkina (Russian: Лариса Михайловна Савкина, born 8 February 1955) is a retired Soviet handball player. She was born in Georgia to Russian parents, but played in Azerbaijan for Automobilist Baku. She was part of the Soviet team, that won a gold medal at the 1980 Olympics in Moscow. She played all five matches and scored one goal.
