= Valentyna Lutayeva =

Ukrainian handball player (1956–2023)

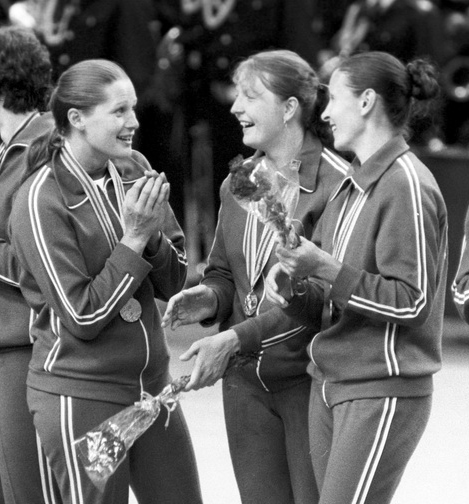
- Lutayeva (center) at the 1980 Olympics

Personal information
- Born: 18 June 1956 Zaporizhzhia, Ukrainian SSR, Soviet Union
- Died: 12 January 2023 (aged 66)
- Height: 176 cm (5 ft 9 in)
- Weight: 75 kg (165 lb)

Sport
- Sport: Handball
- Club: ZII Zaporozhie
Medal record
Representing the Soviet Union
Olympic Games
Gold medal – first place	1980 Moscow	Team

Valentyna Ivanivna Lutayeva (née Berzina, Ukrainian: Валентина Іванівна Лутаєва-Берзіна, 18 June 1956 – 12 January 2023) was a Ukrainian handball player. She was part of the Soviet team that won a gold medal at the 1980 Olympics.
