= Nataliya Kazak =

Soviet rower

Personal information
- Nationality: Soviet
- Born: 4 February 1960 (age 65)

Sport
- Sport: Rowing

Nataliya Kazak (born 4 February 1960) is a Soviet rower. She competed in two events at the 1980 Summer Olympics.
