= Sigita Strečen =

Lithuanian handball player (born 1958)

Olympic medal record

Women's Handball
Gold medal – first place	1980 Moscow	Team

World Championship
Gold medal – first place	1982 Hungary	Team

Sigita Mažeikaitė-Strečen (née Mažeikaitė, born September 24, 1958, in Panevėžys, Lithuanian SSR) is a former Lithuanian handball player who competed in the 1980 Summer Olympics.

In 1980 she won the gold medal with the Soviet team. She played four matches including the final and scored two goals.
