= Viktor Makhorin =

Soviet handball player

Olympic medal record

Men's Handball
Silver medal – second place	1980 Moscow	Team

Viktor Pavlovich Makhorin (Russian: Виктор Павлович Махорин, July 2, 1948 – June 20, 1993) was a Soviet/Russian handball player who competed in the 1980 Summer Olympics. He was born in Toshkent, Toshkent Shahri, Uzbekistan. In 1980 he won the silver medal with the Soviet team. He played all six matches and scored seven goals.
