= Lyubov Sharmay =

Russian basketball player

Medal record

Women's basketball

Representing the Soviet Union

Olympic Games
Gold medal – first place	1980 Moscow	Team competition

Lyubov Georgyevna Sharmay (Russian: Любовь Георгьевна Шармай, born 15 April 1956) is a Russian former basketball player who competed in the 1980 Summer Olympics.
