= Mykola Tomyn =

Soviet handball player

Olympic medal record

Men's Handball
Gold medal – first place	1976 Montreal	Team
Silver medal – second place	1980 Moscow	Team

Mykola Mykolayevich Tomyn (Ukrainian: Микола Миколайович Томин, born December 28, 1948) is a former Soviet/Ukrainian handball player who competed in the 1976 Summer Olympics and in the 1980 Summer Olympics.

In 1976 he won the gold medal with the Soviet team. He played all six matches as goalkeeper.

Four years later he was part of the Soviet team which won the silver medal. He played all six matches as goalkeeper again.
