= Vladimir Kravtsov =

Soviet handball player

Olympic medal record

Men's Handball
Gold medal – first place	1976 Montreal	Team
Silver medal – second place	1980 Moscow	Team

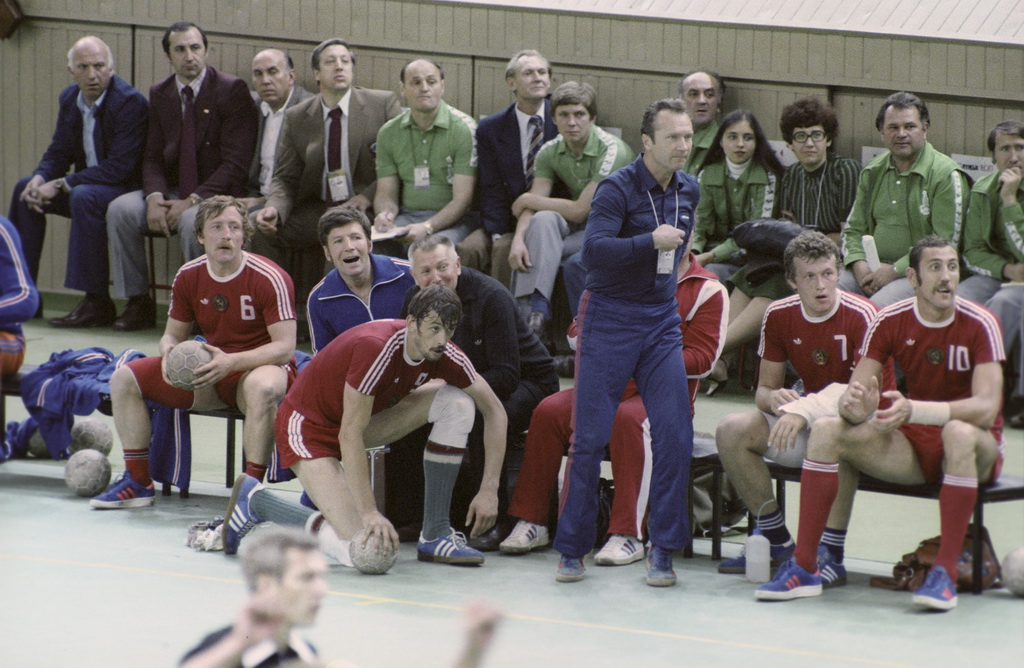

Vladimir Nikolaevich Kravtsov (Russian: Владимир Николаевич Кравцов, October 19, 1949 – December 2, 1999) was a Soviet/Russian handball player who competed in the 1976 Summer Olympics and in the 1980 Summer Olympics. In 1976 he won the gold medal with the Soviet team. He played all six matches and scored fourteen goals. Four years later he was part of the Soviet team which won the silver medal. He played four matches and scored eleven goals.
