= Ashot Karagyan =

Soviet fencer (born 1951)

Personal information
- Born: 23 January 1951 (age 75) Yerevan, Armenia

Sport
- Sport: Fencing
Medal record
Men's fencing
Representing Soviet Union
Olympic Games
Silver medal – second place	1980 Moscow	Foil, team
Bronze medal – third place	1980 Moscow	Épée, team

Ashot Karagyan (Armenian: Աշոտ Հակոբի Կարագյան; born 23 January 1951) is a Soviet fencer. He won a silver medal in the team foil and a bronze in the team épée events at the 1980 Summer Olympics.
