= Iryna Palchykova =

Ukrainian handball player (born 1959)

Olympic medal record

Women's Handball
Gold medal – first place	1980 Moscow	Team

World Championship
Gold medal – first place	1982 Hungary	Team

Iryna Havrylivna Palchykova-Biletska (Ukrainian: Ірина Гаврилівна Пальчикова-Білецька, born March 22, 1959) is a former Soviet/Ukrainian handball player who competed in the 1980 Summer Olympics.

In 1980, she won the gold medal with the Soviet team. She played all five matches and scored four goals.

At club level she played for Spartak Kiev, where she won 8 Soviet Championships and 4 European Cups.
