= Vladimir Repyev =

Soviet handball player

Olympic medal record

Men's Handball
Silver medal – second place	1980 Moscow	Team

Vladimir Georgiyevich Repyev (Russian: Владимир Георгиевич Репьев; July 11, 1956 – January 4, 2009) was a Soviet/Russian handball player who competed in the 1980 Summer Olympics. In 1980 he won the silver medal with the Soviet team. He played one match.
