= Russian Field Hockey Federation =

Governing body of field hockey in Russia

Russian Field Hockey Federation Федерация хоккея на траве России
- Sport: Hockey
- Jurisdiction: Russia
- Affiliation: International Hockey Federation
- Regional affiliation: European Hockey Federation

Official website
- fhtr.ru
- (Russia)

Russian Field Hockey Federation (Russian: Федерация хоккея на траве России, romanized: Federatsiya khokkeya na trave Rossii), is the governing body for field hockey in Russia. The federation is a member of the European Hockey Federation.

The federation was created in 1992, after the 1991 dissolution of the Soviet Union, and took over field hockey in Russia from Federation of bandy and field hockey USSR.

In response to the 2022 Russian invasion of Ukraine, the International Hockey Federation banned Russia from the 2022 Women's FIH Hockey Junior World Cup, and banned Russian officials from FIH events. In addition, the European Hockey Federation banned the participation of all Russian athletes and officials from all events sanctioned by the Federation.

== National teams ==
- Russia men's team
- Russia women's team
