= Svetlana Badulina =

Soviet volleyball player (born 1960)

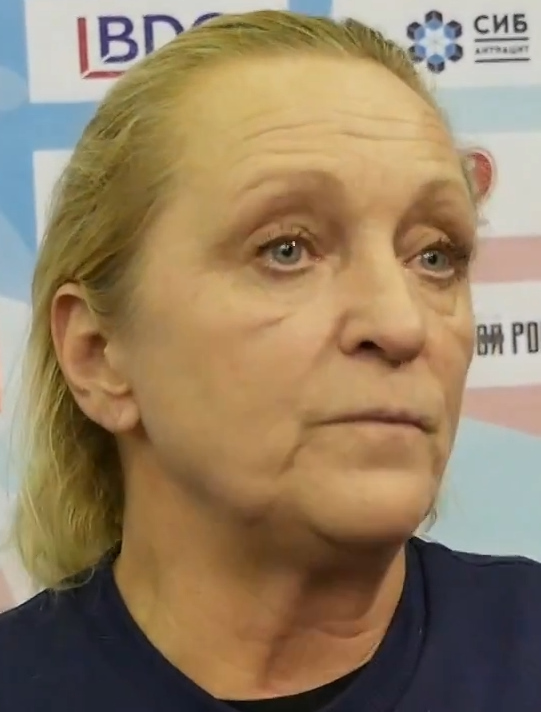
- November 2018

Personal information
- Full name: Svetlana Mikhaylovna Badulina
- Born: 26 October 1960 (age 66); Moscow, Russia
- Height: 1.77 m (5 ft 9 1/2 in)

Volleyball information
- Position: Outside hitter
- Number: 11
Honours
Women's volleyball
Representing the Soviet Union
Olympic Games
| Gold medal – first place | 1980 Moscow | Team |
FIVB World Cup
| Bronze medal – third place | 1985 Japan | Team |

Svetlana Badulina is a Russian former volleyball player for the USSR who won a gold medal in the 1980 Summer Olympics in Moscow, Soviet Union.
