= Natalia Bykova =

Soviet field hockey player (born 1958)

Medal record

Representing the Soviet Union

Women's Field hockey

Olympic Games
Bronze medal – third place	1980 Moscow	Team

Natalia Bykova (born 17 August 1958) is a field hockey player and Olympic medalist. Competing for the Soviet Union, she won a bronze medal at the 1980 Summer Olympics in Moscow. She is the mother of tennis player Vera Zvonareva.
