= Larisa Pavlova =

Soviet volleyball player (born 1952)

Personal information
- Full name: Larisa Mikhaylovna Pavlova
- Born: February 13, 1952 (age 74); Uglegorsky District, Russia
- Height: 1.82 m (5 ft 11 1/2 in)
Honours
Women's volleyball
Representing the Soviet Union
Olympic Games
Gold medal – first place	1980 Moscow	Team

Larisa Pavlova is a former volleyball player for the USSR. Born in Uglegorsky District, she competed for the Soviet Union at the 1980 Summer Olympics in Moscow, Soviet Union and won a gold medal.
