= Valentina Zazdravnykh =

Russian field hockey player (1954–2023)

Medal record

Representing the Soviet Union

Women's Field hockey

Olympic Games
Bronze medal – third place	1980 Moscow	Team

Valentina Mikhailovna Zazdravnykh (Russian: Валентина Михайловна Заздравных; 24 November 1954 – 30 Junе 2023) was a Russian field hockey player and Olympic medalist. Competing for the Soviet Union, she won a bronze medal at the 1980 Summer Olympics in Moscow.

Zazdravnykh died on 30 June 2023, at the age of 68.
