= Lidiya Glubokova =

Soviet field hockey player

Medal record

Representing the Soviet Union

Women's Field hockey

Olympic Games
Bronze medal – third place	1980 Moscow	Team

Lidiya Glubokova (17 September 1953 – 15 May 2022) was a field hockey player and Olympic medalist. Competing for the Soviet Union, she won a bronze medal at the 1980 Summer Olympics in Moscow.
