= Irina Makogonova =

Soviet volleyball player (born 1959)

Personal information
- Full name: Irina Petrovna Makogonova (-Kolodyazhnaya)
- Born: 12 November 1959; Voronezh, Voronezh Oblast, Russian SFSR, Soviet Union
- Height: 1.79 m (5 ft 10 in)

Volleyball information
- Position: Outside hitter
- Number: 7
Honours
Women's volleyball
Representing the Soviet Union
Olympic Games
Gold medal – first place	1980 Moscow	Team
World Championship
Bronze medal – third place	1978 Soviet Union	Team
FIVB World Cup
Bronze medal – third place	1981 Japan	Team

Irina Petrovna Makogonova (Russian: Ири́на Петро́вна Макого́нова) is a Russian former volleyball player who competed for the now defunct Soviet Union. She won a gold medal in the 1980 Moscow Olympics.
