= Olga Solovova =

Soviet volleyball player (born 1953)

Personal information
- Full name: Olga Anatolyevna Solovova
- Born: 22 June 1953 (age 73); Ussuriysk, Primorsky Kray, Russia
- Height: 1.83 m (6 ft 0 in)

Volleyball information
- Position: Middle blocker
- Number: 3
Honours
Women's volleyball
Representing the Soviet Union
Olympic Games
Gold medal – first place	1980 Moscow	Team
FIVB World Cup
Bronze medal – third place	1981 Japan	Team

Olga Solovova (born 22 June 1953) is a former volleyball player for the USSR. Born in Ussuriysk, she won a gold medal with the Soviet Union at the 1980 Summer Olympics in Moscow, Soviet Union.
