= Lyudmila Frolova =

Field hockey player

Medal record

Representing the Soviet Union

Women's Field hockey

Olympic Games
Bronze medal – third place	1980 Moscow	Team

Lyudmila Frolova (born Lyudmila Valeryevna Frolova on July 29, 1953) is a field hockey player and Olympic medalist. Competing for the Soviet Union, she won a bronze medal at the 1980 Summer Olympics in Moscow.
