= Galina Vyuzhanina =

Field hockey player

Medal record

Representing the Soviet Union

Women's Field hockey

Olympic Games
| Bronze medal – third place | 1980 Moscow | Team |

Galina Vyuzhanina (born 3 August 1952) is a field hockey player and Olympic medalist. Competing for the Soviet Union, she won a bronze medal at the 1980 Summer Olympics in Moscow.
