= Leyla Akhmerova =

Uzbek field hockey player (born 1957)

Medal record

Representing the Soviet Union

Women's Field hockey

Olympic Games
Bronze medal – third place	1980 Moscow	Team

Leyla Begnyazovna Akhmerova (born 1 May 1957) is an Uzbek field hockey player and Olympic medallist. Competing for the Soviet Union, she won a bronze medal at the 1980 Summer Olympics in Moscow.
