= Nadezhda Radzevich =

Soviet volleyball player (born 1953)

Personal information
- Full name: Nadezhda Borisovna Radzevich
- Nationality: Russian
- Born: 10 March 1953 (age 73); Chkalov, Chkalovskaya Oblast, Russian SFSR, Soviet Union
- Height: 1.78 m (5 ft 10 in)

Volleyball information
- Position: Opposite
- Number: 1
Honours
Women's volleyball
Representing Soviet Union
Olympic Games
Gold medal – first place	1980 Moscow	Team
World Championship
Bronze medal – third place	1978 Soviet Union
World Cup
Bronze medal – third place	1981 Japan
European Championship
Gold medal – first place	1975 Yugoslavia
Gold medal – first place	1977 Finland
Gold medal – first place	1979 France
Silver medal – second place	1981 Bulgaria
Summer Universiade
Gold medal – first place	1979 Mexico City
European Junior Championship
Gold medal – first place	1971 Italy	Under-20
Gold medal – first place	1973 Netherlands	Under-20

Nadezhda Radzevich is a Russian former volleyball player from Chkalov/Orenburg, who competed for the now defunct Soviet Union who won a gold medal in the 1980 Summer Olympics in Moscow with the Soviet national team.
