= Yelena Andreyuk =

Soviet volleyball player (born 1958)

Personal information
- Full name: Yelena Valentinovna Andreyuk (-Chesnokova)
- Born: 23 November 1958
- Height: 1.80 m (5 ft 11 in)

Volleyball information
- Position: Middle blocker
- Number: 6
Honours
Women's volleyball
Representing the Soviet Union
Olympic Games
Gold medal – first place	1980 Moscow	Team

Yelena Valentinovna Andreyuk is a former volleyball player for the USSR who won a gold medal in the 1980 Summer Olympics in Moscow, Soviet Union.
