= Nadezhda Ovechkina =

Field hockey player

Medal record

Representing the Soviet Union

Women's Field hockey

Olympic Games
Bronze medal – third place	1980 Moscow	Team

Nadezhda Ovechkina (born 30 September 1958) is a Russian field hockey player and Olympic medalist. She was born in Moscow. Competing for the Soviet Union, she won a bronze medal at the 1980 Summer Olympics in Moscow.
