= Lyubov Kozyreva (volleyball) =

Soviet volleyball player (born 1956)

Personal information
- Full name: Lyubov Vladimirovna Kozyreva (Timofeyeva)
- Born: December 12, 1956 (age 69); Krasnozavodsk, Moscow Oblast, Russia
- Height: 1.78 m (5 ft 10 in)

Volleyball information
- Position: Opposite
- Number: 8
Honours
Women's volleyball
Representing the Soviet Union
Olympic Games
Gold medal – first place	1980 Moscow	Team
World Championship
Bronze medal – third place	1978 Soviet Union
European Championship
Gold medal – first place	1979 France

Lyubov Kozyreva (born December 12, 1956) is a Russian former volleyball player for the USSR. Born in Krasnozavodsk, she competed for the Soviet Union at the 1980 Summer Olympics in Moscow, Soviet Union.
