= Svetlana Nikishina =

Soviet volleyball player (born 1958)

Personal information
- Full name: Svetlana Dmitriyevna Nikishina
- Born: October 20, 1958 (age 68); Chelyabinsk, Russia
- Height: 1.74 m (5 ft 8 1/2 in)

Volleyball information
- Position: Setter
- Number: 9

National team
1979–1981	Soviet Union
Honours
Women's volleyball
Representing the Soviet Union
Olympic Games
Gold medal – first place	1980 Moscow	Team
FIVB World Cup
Bronze medal – third place	1981 Japan

Svetlana Nikishina (born October 20, 1958) is a former volleyball player for the USSR. Born in Chelyabinsk, she won a gold medal with the Soviet Union at the 1980 Summer Olympics in Moscow, Soviet Union.
