= Lidiya Loginova =

Soviet volleyball player

Personal information
- Full name: Lidiya Ivanovna Loginova
- Born: 27 February 1951 (age 75); Kazan, Tatar ASSR, Russian SFSR, Soviet Union
- Height: 1.70 m (5 ft 7 in)

Volleyball information
- Position: Setter
- Number: 12
Honours
Women's volleyball
Representing the Soviet Union
Olympic Games
| Gold medal – first place | 1980 Moscow | Team |
World Championship
| Bronze medal – third place | 1978 Soviet Union |
FIVB World Cup
| Bronze medal – third place | 1981 Japan |

Lidiya Loginova (born 27 February 1951) is a Russian former volleyball player. Born in Kazan, the then capital of the Tatar Autonomous Soviet Socialist Republic in the Russian Soviet Federative Socialist Republic, she competed for the Soviet Union at the 1980 Summer Olympics in Moscow, Soviet Union and won a gold medal.
