= Nataliya Razumova =

Soviet volleyball player (born 1961)

Personal information
- Full name: Nataliya Nikolayevna Razumova (Starshova)
- Born: November 21, 1961 (age 64); Revda, Sverdlovsk Oblast, Russian SFSR, Soviet Union (present day Russia)
- Height: 1.84 m (6 ft 1/2 in)

Volleyball information
- Position: Outside hitter
- Number: 2
Honours
Women's volleyball
Representing the Soviet Union
Olympic Games
Gold medal – first place	1980 Moscow	Team

Nataliya Nikolayevna Razumova (Russian: Ната́лья Никола́евна Ра́зумова, born November 21, 1961) is a retired Russian volleyball player who competed for the now defunct Soviet Union. Born in Revda, Sverdlovsk Oblast, she competed for the Soviet national team at the 1980 Moscow Olympics, where she won a gold medal.
