= Handball at the 1980 Summer Olympics – Men's tournament =

1980 Men's Olympic handball tournament
Tournament details
- Host country: Soviet Union
- Venues: 2 (in 1 host city)
- Dates: 20–30 July 1980
- Teams: 12

Final positions
- Champions: East Germany (1st title)
- Runners-up: Soviet Union
- Third place: Romania
- Fourth place: Hungary

Tournament statistics
- Matches played: 36
- Goals scored: 1,560 (43.33 per match)
- Top scorers: (Poland) Jerzy Klempel (44 goals)

The men's tournament was one of two handball tournaments at the 1980 Summer Olympics. It was the fourth appearance of a men's handball tournament as a medal event at the Olympic Games.

== Qualification ==
Qualification	Date	Host	Berths	Qualified
Host nation	23 October 1974	(Austria) Vienna	1	Soviet Union
1978 World Championship	26 January – 5 February 1978	Denmark	~~6~~ 5	~~West Germany~~; East Germany; Denmark; Yugoslavia; Poland; Romania
1978 World Championship Group B	22 February – 3 March 1978	Spain	~~2~~ 3	Spain; Switzerland; Hungary
1979 African Championship	20–31 July 1979	(Republic of the Congo) Brazzaville	1	~~Tunisia~~; Algeria
1980 Pan American Championship	7–14 January 1980	Mexico City	1	Cuba
1979 Asian Championship	4–9 November 1979	(China) Nanjing	1	~~Japan~~; Kuwait
Total			12	

== Results ==
=== Preliminary round ===
12 teams played each other in two groups to decide for which place each of them will compete in the final round.

==== Group A ====
Pos	Team	Pld	W	D	L	GF	GA	GD	Pts	Qualification
1	East Germany	5	4	1	0	108	92	+16	9	Gold medal game
2	Hungary	5	3	2	0	96	88	+8	8	Bronze medal game
3	Spain	5	2	1	2	102	106	−4	5	Fifth place game
4	Poland	5	2	1	2	123	97	+26	5	Seventh place game
5	(International Olympic Committee) Denmark	5	1	0	4	96	104	−8	2	Ninth place game
6	Cuba	5	0	1	4	103	141	−38	1	Eleventh place game

20 July 1980; 17:00	Denmark (International Olympic Committee)	30–18	Cuba	Sokolniki Arena
20 July 1980; 17:00	Poulsen 8	(18–8)	Querol 5	Sokolniki Arena

20 July 1980; 18:30	Poland	20–20	Hungary	Sokolniki Arena
20 July 1980; 18:30	Garpiel, Kałuziński 5	(7–11)	Kontra 8	Sokolniki Arena

20 July 1980; 20:00	East Germany	21–17	Spain	Sokolniki Arena
20 July 1980; 20:00	Doering, Wahl 6	(6–9)	Uría 6	Sokolniki Arena

22 July 1980; 17:00	Poland	34–19	Cuba	Dynamo Sports Palace
22 July 1980; 17:00	Klempel 11	(14–10)	Prendes 5	Dynamo Sports Palace

22 July 1980; 18:30	Denmark (International Olympic Committee)	19–20	Spain	Dynamo Sports Palace
22 July 1980; 18:30	Pazyj 5	(9–9)	Albisu 5	Dynamo Sports Palace

22 July 1980; 20:00	East Germany	14–14	Hungary	Dynamo Sports Palace
22 July 1980; 20:00	Wahl 6	(9–7)	Kontra 4	Dynamo Sports Palace

24 July 1980; 17:00	Spain	17–20	Hungary	Sokolniki Arena
24 July 1980; 17:00	Serrano 4	(8–10)	Kovács 6	Sokolniki Arena

24 July 1980; 18:30	Denmark (International Olympic Committee)	12–26	Poland	Sokolniki Arena
24 July 1980; 18:30	Jeppesen 5	(5–9)	Klempel 10	Sokolniki Arena

24 July 1980; 20:00	East Germany	27–20	Cuba	Sokolniki Arena
24 July 1980; 20:00	Wahl 6	(13–10)	Agramonte 9	Sokolniki Arena

26 July 1980; 17:00	Spain	24–24	Cuba	Dynamo Sports Palace
26 July 1980; 17:00	Albisu 9	(9–13)	Agramonte, Prendes 7	Dynamo Sports Palace

26 July 1980; 18:30	Denmark (International Olympic Committee)	15–16	Hungary	Dynamo Sports Palace
26 July 1980; 18:30	Poulsen 4	(6–8)	Kovács 4	Dynamo Sports Palace

26 July 1980; 20:00	East Germany	22–21	Poland	Dynamo Sports Palace
26 July 1980; 20:00	Dreibrodt, Wahl 5	(11–9)	Panas 7	Dynamo Sports Palace

28 July 1980; 17:00	Hungary	26–22	Cuba	Sokolniki Arena
28 July 1980; 17:00	Kontra 10	(14–11)	Casuso 8	Sokolniki Arena

28 July 1980; 18:30	Poland	22–24	Spain	Sokolniki Arena
28 July 1980; 18:30	Klempel 8	(13–11)	Albisu 7	Sokolniki Arena

28 July 1980; 20:00	East Germany	24–20	(International Olympic Committee) Denmark	Sokolniki Arena
28 July 1980; 20:00	Krüger 7	(13–9)	Dahl-Nielsen 7	Sokolniki Arena

==== Group B ====
Pos	Team	Pld	W	D	L	GF	GA	GD	Pts	Qualification
1	Soviet Union (H)	5	4	0	1	134	75	+59	8	Gold medal game
2	Romania	5	4	0	1	119	88	+31	8	Bronze medal game
3	Yugoslavia	5	4	0	1	132	92	+40	8	Fifth place game
4	(International Olympic Committee) Switzerland	5	2	0	3	110	98	+12	4	Seventh place game
5	Algeria	5	1	0	4	94	124	−30	2	Ninth place game
6	Kuwait	5	0	0	5	64	176	−112	0	Eleventh place game

(H) Hosts

20 July 1980; 17:00	Yugoslavia	22–18	Algeria	Dynamo Sports Palace
20 July 1980; 17:00	Jovović 6	(12–10)	Mekhnache 6	Dynamo Sports Palace

20 July 1980; 18:30	Romania	32–12	Kuwait	Dynamo Sports Palace
20 July 1980; 18:30	Stîngă, Vasilache 5	(18–3)	J. Al-Qassar 9	Dynamo Sports Palace

20 July 1980; 20:00	Soviet Union	22–15	(International Olympic Committee) Switzerland	Dynamo Sports Palace
20 July 1980; 20:00	Anpilogov, Belov 4	(13–8)	Züllig 5	Dynamo Sports Palace

22 July 1980; 17:00	Romania	26–18	Algeria	Sokolniki Arena
22 July 1980; 17:00	Stîngă 7	(14–7)	Djeffal 10	Sokolniki Arena

22 July 1980; 18:30	Soviet Union	38–11	Kuwait	Sokolniki Arena
22 July 1980; 18:30	Anpilogov 11	(22–5)	J. Al-Qassar 4	Sokolniki Arena

22 July 1980; 20:00	Yugoslavia	26–21	(International Olympic Committee) Switzerland	Sokolniki Arena
22 July 1980; 20:00	Obran 6	(12–8)	Jehle, Züllig 6	Sokolniki Arena

24 July 1980; 17:00	Switzerland (International Olympic Committee)	32–14	Kuwait	Dynamo Sports Palace
24 July 1980; 17:00	Züllig 10	(14–6)	J. Al-Qassar 5	Dynamo Sports Palace

24 July 1980; 18:30	Soviet Union	33–10	Algeria	Dynamo Sports Palace
24 July 1980; 18:30	Fedyukin, Zhuk 6	(16–3)	Hamiche 3	Dynamo Sports Palace

24 July 1980; 20:00	Yugoslavia	23–21	Romania	Dynamo Sports Palace
24 July 1980; 20:00	Jurina 8	(12–9)	Stîngă 7	Dynamo Sports Palace

26 July 1980; 17:00	Spain	26–18	Algeria	Sokolniki Arena
26 July 1980; 17:00	Züllig 11	(11–7)	Bouzerar 5	Sokolniki Arena

26 July 1980; 18:30	Yugoslavia	44–10	Kuwait	Sokolniki Arena
26 July 1980; 18:30	Jurina 9	(24–5)	Al-Qena'i 4	Sokolniki Arena

26 July 1980; 20:00	Soviet Union	19–22	Romania	Sokolniki Arena
26 July 1980; 20:00	Belov 5	(15–9)	Stîngă 7	Sokolniki Arena

28 July 1980; 17:00	Kuwait	17–30	Algeria	Dynamo Sports Palace
28 July 1980; 17:00	Al-Randi 4	(14–11)	Djeffal 7	Dynamo Sports Palace

28 July 1980; 18:30	Romania	18–16	(International Olympic Committee) Switzerland	Dynamo Sports Palace
28 July 1980; 18:30	Birtalan 6	(9–6)	Jehle, Züllig 4	Dynamo Sports Palace

28 July 1980; 20:00	Soviet Union	22–17	Yugoslavia	Dynamo Sports Palace
28 July 1980; 20:00	Fedyukin 5	(12–9)	Jurina 9	Dynamo Sports Palace

=== Final round ===
==== Eleventh place game ====
30 July 1980; 11:00	Cuba	32–24	Kuwait	Dynamo Sports Palace
30 July 1980; 11:00	Agramonte 9	(16–13)	Al-Randi 11	Dynamo Sports Palace

==== Ninth place game ====
30 July 1980; 12:30	Denmark (International Olympic Committee)	28–20	Algeria	Dynamo Sports Palace
30 July 1980; 12:30	Jeppesen 8	(15–9)	Djeffal 6	Dynamo Sports Palace

==== Seventh place game ====
30 July 1980
14:00
Poland
23–22 (ET)
(International Olympic Committee) Switzerland
Dynamo Sports Palace
Klempel 9
(11–10)
Huber, Maag 5

FT: 20-20 ET: 3-2

==== Fifth place game ====
30 July 1980
13:00
Spain
24–23 (ET)
Yugoslavia
Sokolniki Arena
Uría 6
(12–7)
Mrkonja 8

FT: 21-21 ET: 3-2

==== Bronze medal game ====
30 July 1980; 14:45	Hungary	18–20	Romania	Sokolniki Arena
30 July 1980; 14:45	Kovács 5	(7–11)	Stîngă 7	Sokolniki Arena

==== Gold medal game ====
30 July 1980
18:30
East Germany
23–22 (ET)
Soviet Union
Sokolniki Arena
Krüger 6
(10–10)
Anpilogov, Belov 5

FT: 20–20 ET: 3–2

== Rankings and statistics ==
=== Final ranking ===
Rank	Team
1st place, gold medalist(s)	East Germany
2nd place, silver medalist(s)	Soviet Union
3rd place, bronze medalist(s)	Romania
4	Hungary
5	Spain
6	Yugoslavia
7	Poland
8	(International Olympic Committee) Switzerland
9	(International Olympic Committee) Denmark
10	Algeria
11	Cuba
12	Kuwait

=== Top goalscorers ===
Rank	Name	Goals
1	(Poland) Jerzy Klempel	44
2	(International Olympic Committee) Ernst Züllig	40
3	(Romania) Vasile Stîngă	36
4	(Cuba) Jesús Agramonte	34
5	(Algeria) Ahcene Djeffal	33
5	(Socialist Federal Republic of Yugoslavia) Pavle Jurina	33
5	(East Germany) Frank-Michael Wahl	33
8	(Hungary) Zsolt Kontra	30
8	(Cuba) Juan Prendes	30
10	(Soviet Union) Aleksandr Anpilogov	29

== Team rosters ==
Algeria	Cuba	Denmark	East Germany	Hungary	Kuwait
Ali Akacha; Omar Azzeb; Abdel Atif Bakir; Abdelkrim Bendjemil; Abdel Atif Bergheul; Azzedine Bouzerar; Ahcen Djeffal; Ahmed Farfar; Abdel Krim Hamiche; Kamel Hebri; Mohamed Machou; Mouloud Mekhnache; Rashid Mokhrani; Abdel Madjid Slimani Coach: Aziz Derouaz	Jesús Agramonte; Moisés Casales; Roberto Casuso; Ibrain Crombet; Miguel Izquierdo; Lázaro Jiménez; Juan Llanes; Sabino Medina; José Nenínger; Pablo Pedroso; Juan Prendes; Juan Querol; Roberto Zulueta Coach: Lázaro Pedroso	Michael Jørn Berg; Morten Stig Christensen; Anders Dahl-Nielsen; Iver Grunnet; Hans Hattesen; Carsten Haurum; Palle Jensen; Bjarne Jeppesen; Mogens Jeppesen; Thomas Pazyj; Erik Bue Pedersen; Poul Kjær Poulsen; Per Skaarup; Ole Nørskov Sørensen Coach: Leif Mikkelsen	Hans-Georg Beyer; Lothar Doering; Günter Dreibrodt; Ernst Gerlach; Klaus Gruner; Rainer Höft; Hans-Georg Jaunich; Hartmut Krüger; Peter Rost; Dietmar Schmidt; Wieland Schmidt; Siegfried Voigt; Frank-Michael Wahl; Ingolf Wiegert Coach: Paul Tiedemann	Béla Bartalos (Tatabánya KC); János Fodor (FTC); Ernő Gubányi (Tatabánya KC); László Jánovszki (Bud. Spartacus); Alpár Jegenyés (Bud. Honvéd); József Kenyeres (Bud. Honvéd); Zsolt Kontra (Tatabánya KC); Péter Kovács (Bud. Honvéd); Miklós Kovacsics (Pécsi Mecsek); Ambrus Lele (Szegedi Volán); Árpád Pál (Tatabánya KC); László Szabó (Szegedi Volán); István Szilágyi (FTC); Sándor Vass (Elektromos SE) Coach: Mihály Faludi	Abdel Aziz Al-Anjri; Khamis Bashir; Jasem al-Deyab; Ahmed al-Emran; Majid Al-Khamis; Faraj Al-Mutairi; Saleh Najem; Jasem Al-Qassar; Mond al-Qassar; Abdullah Al-Qena'i; Musa'ed Al-Randi; Ismael Shah Al-Zadah; Khaled Shah; Fawzi Al-Shuwairbat Coach: János Adorján
Poland	Romania	Soviet Union	Spain	Switzerland	Yugoslavia
Janusz Brzozowski; Piotr Czaczka; Jerzy Garpiel; Zbigniew Gawlik; Ryszard Jedliński; Andrzej Kącki; Alfred Kałuziński; Jerzy Klempel; Grzegorz Kosma; Marek Panas; Henryk Rozmiarek; Zbigniew Tłuczyński; Daniel Waszkiewicz; Mieczysław Wojczak Coach: Jacek Zglinicki	Ştefan Birtalan; Iosif Boroş; Adrian Cosma; Cezar Drăgăniṭă; Marian Dumitru; Cornel Durău; Alexandru Fölker; Claudiu Ionescu; Nicolae Munteanu; Vasile Stîngă; Lucian Vasilache; Neculai Vasilcă; Radu Voina; Maricel Voinea Coaches: Kunst-Ghermănescu, Nedeff and Pană	Aleksandr Anpilogov; Vladimir Belov; Yevgeni Chernyshov; Anatoli Fedyukin; Mykhaylo Ishchenko; Aleksandr Karshakevich; Yury Kidyayev; Vladimir Kravtsov; Serhiy Kushniryuk; Viktor Makhorin; Voldemaras Novickis; Vladimir Repev; Mykola Tomyn; Aleksey Zhuk Coach: Anatoly Yevtushenko	Jesús María Albisu; Vicente Calabuig; Juan de la Puente; Juan Pedro de Miguel; Francisco López; Gregorio López; Rafael López; Agustín Milián; Juan Francisco Muñoz; José Ignacio Novoa; José María Pagoaga; Eugenio Serrano; Juan José Uría Coach: Javier Cabanas	Konrad Affolter; Roland Brand; Hans Huber; Ugo Jametti; Peter Jehle; Robert Jehle; Hanspeter Lutz; Peter Maag; Walter Müller; Martin Ott; Max Schär; Rudolf Weber; Eduard Wickli; Ernst Züllig Coach: Vinko Kandija	Zlatan Arnautović; Jovica Cvetković; Adnan Dizdar; Jovica Elezović; Mile Isaković; Drago Jovović; Pavle Jurina; Enver Koso; Peter Mahne; Jasmin Mrkonja; Velibor Nenadić; Goran Nerić; Stjepan Obran; Momir Rnić Coach: Branislav Pokrajac
