= Kuwait at the 1980 Summer Olympics =

- IOC code: KUW
- NOC: Kuwait Olympic Committee

in Moscow
- Competitors: 56 in 7 sports
- Medals: Gold 0 Silver 0 Bronze 0 Total 0

Summer Olympics appearances (overview)
- 1968; 1972; 1976; 1980; 1984; 1988; 1992; 1996; 2000; 2004; 2008; 2012; 2016; 2020; 2024

Other related appearances
- Independent Olympic Athletes (2016)

Kuwait competed at the 1980 Summer Olympics in Moscow, USSR. 56 competitors, all men, took part in 26 events in 7 sports.

== Athletics ==
Men's 100 metres

- Abdul Majeed Al-Mosawi

- Heat — 11.28 (→ did not advance)

Men's 200 metres

- Abdul Majeed Al-Mosawi

- Heat — did not start (→ did not advance)

Men's 800 metres

- Khaled Hussain Mahmoud

- Heat — 1:54.6 (→ did not advance)

Men's 1,500 metres

- Khaled Khalifa Al-Shammari

- Heat — 3:57.6 (→ did not advance)

Men's 400 m Hurdles

- Abdultif Hashem

- Heat — 53.31 (→ did not advance)

Men's Discus Throw

- Najem Najem

- Qualification — 39.26 m (→ did not advance, 17th place)

Men's Hammer Throw

- Khaled Murad Ghaloum

- Qualification — 47.40 m (→ did not advance, 17th place)

Men's Shot Put

- Mohammad Al-Zinkawi

- Qualification — 17.15 m (→ did not advance, 14th place)

Men's Long Jump

- Essa Hashem

- Qualification — no mark (→ no ranking)

== Diving ==
Men

Athlete	Event	Preliminary		Final	
Athlete	Event	Points	Rank	Points	Rank
Abdullah Mayouf	10 m platform	326.34	23	Did not advance	

== Fencing ==
Nine fencers represented Kuwait in 1980.

Men's foil

- Khaled Al-Awadhi
- Kifah Al-Mutawa
- Ahmed Al-Ahmed

Men's team foil

- Ahmed Al-Ahmed, Khaled Al-Awadhi, Ali Al-Khawajah, Kifah Al-Mutawa

Men's épée

- Kazem Hasan
- Mohamed Al-Thuwani
- Osama Al-Khurafi

Men's team épée

- Ebrahim Al-Cattan, Osama Al-Khurafi, Mohamed Al-Thuwani, Kazem Hasan, Kifah Al-Mutawa

Men's sabre

- Ahmed Al-Ahmed
- Ali Al-Khawajah
- Mohamed Eyiad

== Football ==
Men's Team Competition

- Preliminary Round (Group B)

- Defeated Nigeria (3-1)
- Drew with Colombia (1-1)
- Drew with Czechoslovakia (0-0)

- Quarter Finals

- Lost to Soviet Union (1-2) → Eliminated

- Team Roster

- Ahmad al-Trabulsi
- Mahboub Mubarak
- Jamal al-Qabendi
- Waleed al-Mubarak
- Saed al-Houti
- Fathi Marzouq
- Abdulla al-Biloushi
- Jasem Sultan
- Mu'ayed al-Haddad
- Hamad Bouhamad
- Yousef al-Suwayed
- Ahmad Askar
- Humoud al-Shemmari
- Sami al-Hashash
- Faisal al-Daakhjl
- Abdulnabi al-Khaldi

== Handball ==
Men's Team Competition

- Preliminary Round (Group B)

- Lost to Romania (12-32)
- Lost to Soviet Union (11-38)
- Lost to Switzerland (14-32)
- Lost to Yugoslavia (10-44)
- Lost to Algeria (17-30)

- Classification Match

- 11th/12th place: Lost to Cuba (23-32) → 12th place

- Team Roster

- Faraj Al-Mutairi
- Khalid Shahzadah
- Saleh Najem
- Fawzi al-Shuwairbat
- Jasem al-Deyab
- Ismaeel Shahzadah
- Jasem Al-Qassar
- Majid Al-Khamis
- Abdel Aziz Al-Anjri
- Mond al-Qassar
- Musa'ed Al-Randi
- Khamis Bashir
- Abdullah Al-Qena'i
- Ahmad al-Emran

== Swimming ==
Men

Athlete	Event	Heat		Semifinal		Final	
Athlete	Event	Time	Rank	Time	Rank	Time	Rank
Adham Hemdan	100 m freestyle	58.33	34	Did not advance			
Adham Hemdan	200 m freestyle	2:07.51	38	—N/a		Did not advance	
Mohamed Abdul Wahab	400 m freestyle	4:37.68	28	—N/a		Did not advance	
Mohamed Abdul Wahab	100 m butterfly	1:06.35	31	Did not advance			
Saleh Marzouk	200 m butterfly	2:36.53	25	—N/a		Did not advance	
