= Switzerland at the 1980 Summer Olympics =

- Flag of the Olympic Movement
- IOC code: SUI
- NOC: Swiss Olympic Association

in Moscow
- Competitors: 73 (67 men, 6 women) in 10 sports
- Medals Ranked 19th: Gold 2 Silver 0 Bronze 0 Total 2

Summer Olympics appearances (overview)
- 1896; 1900; 1904; 1908; 1912; 1920; 1924; 1928; 1932; 1936; 1948; 1952; 1956; 1960; 1964; 1968; 1972; 1976; 1980; 1984; 1988; 1992; 1996; 2000; 2004; 2008; 2012; 2016; 2020; 2024

Other related appearances
- 1906 Intercalated Games

Switzerland competed at the 1980 Summer Olympics in Moscow, USSR. In partial support of the American-led 1980 Summer Olympics boycott, Switzerland competed under the Olympic Flag instead of its national flag. 73 competitors, 67 men and 6 women, took part in 45 events in 10 sports.

== Medalists ==
=== Gold ===
- Robert Dill-Bundi — Cycling, Men's 4.000m Individual Pursuit
- Jürg Röthlisberger — Judo, Men's Middleweight (86 kg)

== Archery ==
After not competing in the 1976 archery competition, Switzerland returned in 1980 with four competitors. Lotti Tschanz earned the nation's first top eight finish.

Women's Individual Competition:

- Lotti Tschanz — 2346 points (→ 8th place)
- Erika Ulrich — 2240 points (→ 18th place)

Men's Individual Competition:

- Romeo Frigo — 2364 points (→ 18th place)
- Patrick Jopp — 2190 points (→ 32nd place)

== Athletics ==
Men's 1,500 metres

- Pierre Délèze

- Heat — 3:44.8 (→ did not advance)

Men's 5,000 metres

- Markus Ryffel

- Heat — 13:45.0
- Semi Final — 13:29.3
- Final — 13:23.1 (→ 5th place)

Men's 10,000 metres

- Markus Ryffel

- Heat — did not finish (→ did not advance)

Men's Marathon

- Josef Peter

- Final — 2:24:53 (→ 40th place)

Men's 4×400 metres Relay

- Rolf Strittmatter, Peter Haas, Rolf Gisler, and Urs Kamber

- Heat — 3:07.2 (→ did not advance)

Men's 400 m Hurdles

- Franz Meier

- Heat — 50.32
- Semifinals — 50.12
- Final — 50.00 (→ 7th place)

Men's Long Jump

- Rolf Bernhard

- Qualification — 7.98 m
- Final — 7.88 m (→ 9th place)

Men's High Jump

- Roland Dalhäuser

- Qualification — 2.21 m
- Final — 2.24 m (→ 5th place)

Men's Pole Vault

- Felix Böhni

- Qualification — 5.15 m (→ did not advance)

Men's Shot Put

- Jean-Pierre Egger

- Qualification — 19.61 m
- Final — 18.90 m (→ 12th place)

Men's Decathlon

- Stephan Niklaus

- Final — 7762 points (→ 12th place)

Women's 100 metres

- Brigitte Senglaub

- Heat — 11.69
- Quarterfinals — 11.56 (→ did not advance)

- Mosi Alli

- Heat — 12.19 (→ did not advance)

Women's 1,500 metres

- Cornelia Bürki

- Heat — 4:05.5 (→ did not advance)

Women's 100 m Hurdles

- Yvonne Von Kauffungen

- Heat — did not start (→ did not advance)

== Cycling ==
Ten cyclists represented Switzerland in 1980. Robert Dill-Bundi won gold in the individual pursuit.

Individual road race

- Gilbert Glaus
- Richard Trinkler
- Hubert Seiz
- Jürg Luchs

Team time trial

- Gilbert Glaus
- Fritz Joost
- Jürg Luchs
- Richard Trinkler

Sprint

- Heinz Isler

1000m time trial

- Heinz Isler

Individual pursuit

- Robert Dill-Bundi

Team pursuit

- Robert Dill-Bundi
- Urs Freuler
- Hans Känel
- Hans Ledermann

== Handball ==
=== Men's team competition ===
- Preliminary Round (Group B)

- Lost to Soviet Union (15-22)
- Lost to Yugoslavia (21-26)
- Defeated Kuwait (32-14)
- Defeated Algeria (26-18)
- Lost to Romania (16-18)

- Classification Match

- 7th/8th place: Lost to Poland (22-23) → 8th place

- Team Roster

- Edi Wickli
- Ernst Züllig
- Robert Jehle
- Roland Brand
- Max Schär
- Peter Maag
- Walter Müller
- Rudolf Weber
- Hans Huber
- Konrad Affolter
- Hanspeter Lutz
- Ugo Jametti
- Peter Jehle
- Martin Ott

== Rowing ==
Men's single sculls

- Bernard Destraz (7th)

Men's coxless fours

- Jörg Weitnauer, Bruno Saile, Hans-Konrad Trümpler, Stefan Netzle (6th)

Men's coxed fours

- Daniel Homberger, Peter Rahn, Roland Stocker, Peter Stocker, Karl Graf (6th)

== Swimming ==
Men's 100m Freestyle

- Stéfan Voléry

- Heats — 52,68 (→ did not advance)
