= Jasem =

Jasem is a given name and surname of Arabic origin. Notable people with the name include:

== Given name ==
- Jasem Amiri (born 1987), Iranian wrestler
- Jasem Delavari (1986–2025), Iranian amateur boxer
- Jasem Al-Deyab, Kuwaiti handball player
- Sami Jasem Al-Dosari (born 1965), Saudi Arabian footballer
- Jasem Al-Dowaila (born 1963), Kuwaiti hurdler
- Jasem Al-Hail (born 1992), Qatari footballer
- Jasem Al-Huwaidi (born 1972), Kuwaiti footballer
- Jasem Al-Qassar, Kuwaiti handball player
- Jasem Sadeghi (born 1986), Iranian footballer
- Jasem Yaqoub (born 1953), Kuwaiti footballer

== Surname ==
- Mahir Jasem (born 1989), Emirati footballer
- Waleed Al-Jasem (1959–2025), Kuwaiti footballer

== See also ==
- Jassem, a city in southern Syria
