= Anatoli Fedyukin =

Soviet handball player (1952–2020)

Personal information
- Full name: Anatoli Viktorovich Fedyukin
- Nationality: Russian
- Born: January 26, 1952 Voronezh, Soviet Union
- Died: July 29, 2020 (aged 68)
- Height: 180 cm (71 in)

Sport
- Sport: Handball
- Position: Right wing

Senior clubs
- Years: Team
- 1967–1972: Trud Moscow
- 1972–1978: SK Kunzevo
- 1978–1983: CSKA Moscow
National team
Years	Team	Apps	(Gls)
1972–1980	Soviet Union	103	(222)

Teams managed
- –1989: Iskra Odinzovo
- 1989–1995: CSKA Moscow
- 2000–2002: Fram Reykjavik
- 2002–2004: Energija Voronezh
Medal record
Men's Handball
Olympic Games
Gold medal – first place	1976 Montreal	Team
Silver medal – second place	1980 Moscow	Team
World Championship
Gold medal – first place	1978 West Germany	Team
Silver medal – second place	1978 Denmark	Team

Anatoli Viktorovich Fedyukin (Russian: Анатолий Викторович Федюкин; 26 January 1952 in Voronezh – 29 July 2020) was a Soviet/Russian handball player and coach. He won both Olympic and World gold medals, and competed in the 1976 Summer Olympics and in the 1980 Summer Olympics.

== Career ==
He trained at Zenit in Moscow until 1978 and at the Armed Forces sports society (CSKA) in the same city since then. He won the Soviet Men's Handball Championship 4 times (1979, 1980, 1982 and 1983) and reached the final of the 1982-83 European Cup, where CSKA lost to VfL Gummersbach.

In 1976 he won the Olympic gold medal with the Soviet team. He played three matches including the final.

Four years later he was part of the Soviet team which won the silver medal. He played five matches including the final and scored 21 goals.

At the 1978 World Championship he won a silver medal, losing to West Germany in the final. At the 1982 World Championship he won a gold medal.

== Coaching career ==
After his playing days he first coached CSKA's second team Iskra Odinzowo, and then CSKA from 1989 to 1995. Here he won the Russian Handball Super League in 1994 and 1995. From 2000 to 2002 he coached the Icelandic team Fram Reykjavik. From 2002 to 2004 he coached Energija Voronezh.
