= Aleksandr Anpilogov =

Soviet handball player (born 1954)

Personal information
- Full name: Aleksandr Semyonovich Anpilogov
- Born: 18 January 1954 (age 72) Tbilisi
- Height: 203 cm (80 in)

Sport
- Sport: Handball
- Position: Left back / right back

Senior clubs
- Years: Team
- 1970-1985: Burevestnik Tbilisi
- 1987-1992: ETSV 09 Landshut
National team
| Years | Team | Apps | (Gls) |
| 1974-1984 | Soviet Union | 217 | (572) |

Teams managed
- –: ETSV 09 Landshut
- 1999-2000: HC Wuppertal (assistent)
- 2000-2001: Greece Women
Medal record
Representing Soviet Union
Men's Handball
Olympic Games
| Gold medal – first place | 1976 Montreal | Team |
| Silver medal – second place | 1980 Moscow | Team |
World Championship
| Silver medal – second place | 1978 Denmark | Team |
| Gold medal – first place | 1982 West Germany | Team |

Aleksandr Semyonovich Anpilogov (Georgian: ალექსანდრე ანპილოგოვი, Russian: Александр Семёнович Анпилогов, born 18 January 1954) is a former Soviet/Georgian handball player who competed in the 1976 Summer Olympics and in the 1980 Summer Olympics.

Anpilogov trained at Burevestnik in Tbilisi. In 1976 he won the Olympic gold medal with the Soviet team. He played all six matches and scored 13 goals.

Four years later he was part of the Soviet team which won the silver medal. He played all six matches and scored 29 goals.
