= Mykhaylo Ishchenko =

Soviet handball player

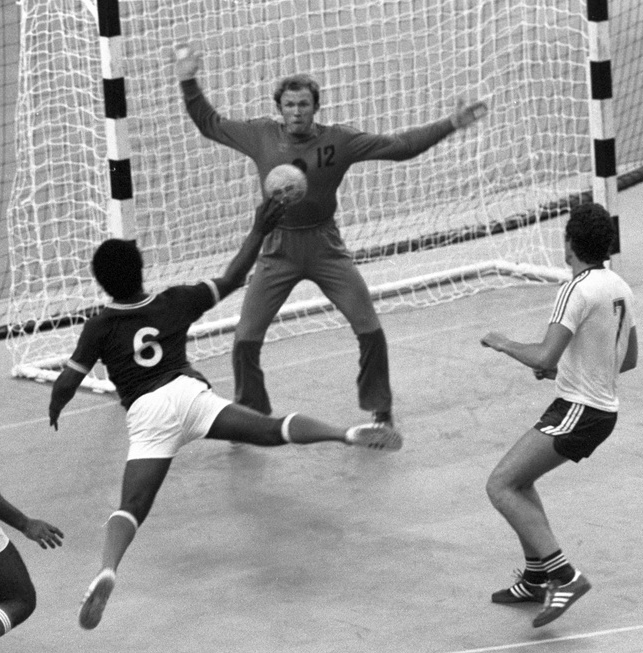
- Ishchenko at the 1980 Olympics

Personal information
- Born: 19 May 1950 (age 76) Morozovsk, Russian SFSR, Soviet Union
- Height: 191 cm (75 in)

Sport
- Sport: Handball
- Position: Goalkeeper

Senior clubs
- Years: Team
- -1976: Burevestnik Zaporizhzhia
- 1976–1986: CSKA Kyiv
- –: →SKA Lviv
National team
| Years | Team | Apps | (Gls) |
| 1971–1986 | Soviet Union | 167 | (1) |
Medal record
Representing the Soviet Union
Olympic Games
| Gold medal – first place | 1976 Montreal | Team |
| Silver medal – second place | 1980 Moscow | Team |
World Championships
| Silver medal – second place | 1978 Denmark | Team |
| Gold medal – first place | 1982 West Germany | Team |

Mykhaylo Oleksiyovich Ishchenko (Ukrainian: Михайло Олексійович Іщенко; born 19 May 1950) is a retired Soviet handball goalkeeper who competed in the 1972, 1976 and 1980 Summer Olympics. He won several awards; such as gold medal in 1976, a silver in 1980 and placed fifth in 1972. He won another set of gold and silver medal at the world championships.
