= List of men's handballers with 1000 or more international goals =

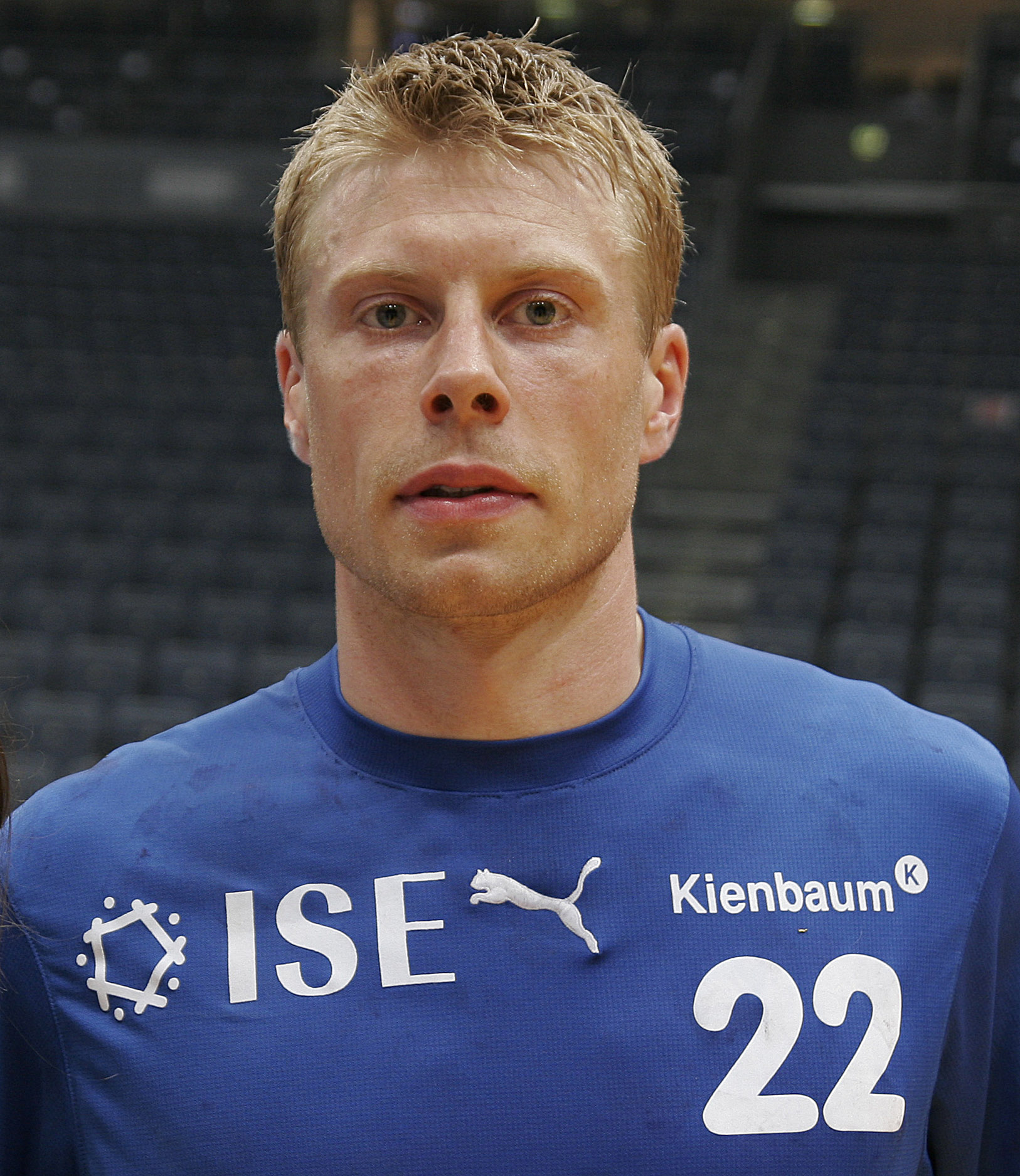
Iceland's Guðjón Valur Sigurðsson holds the record with 1879 goals.

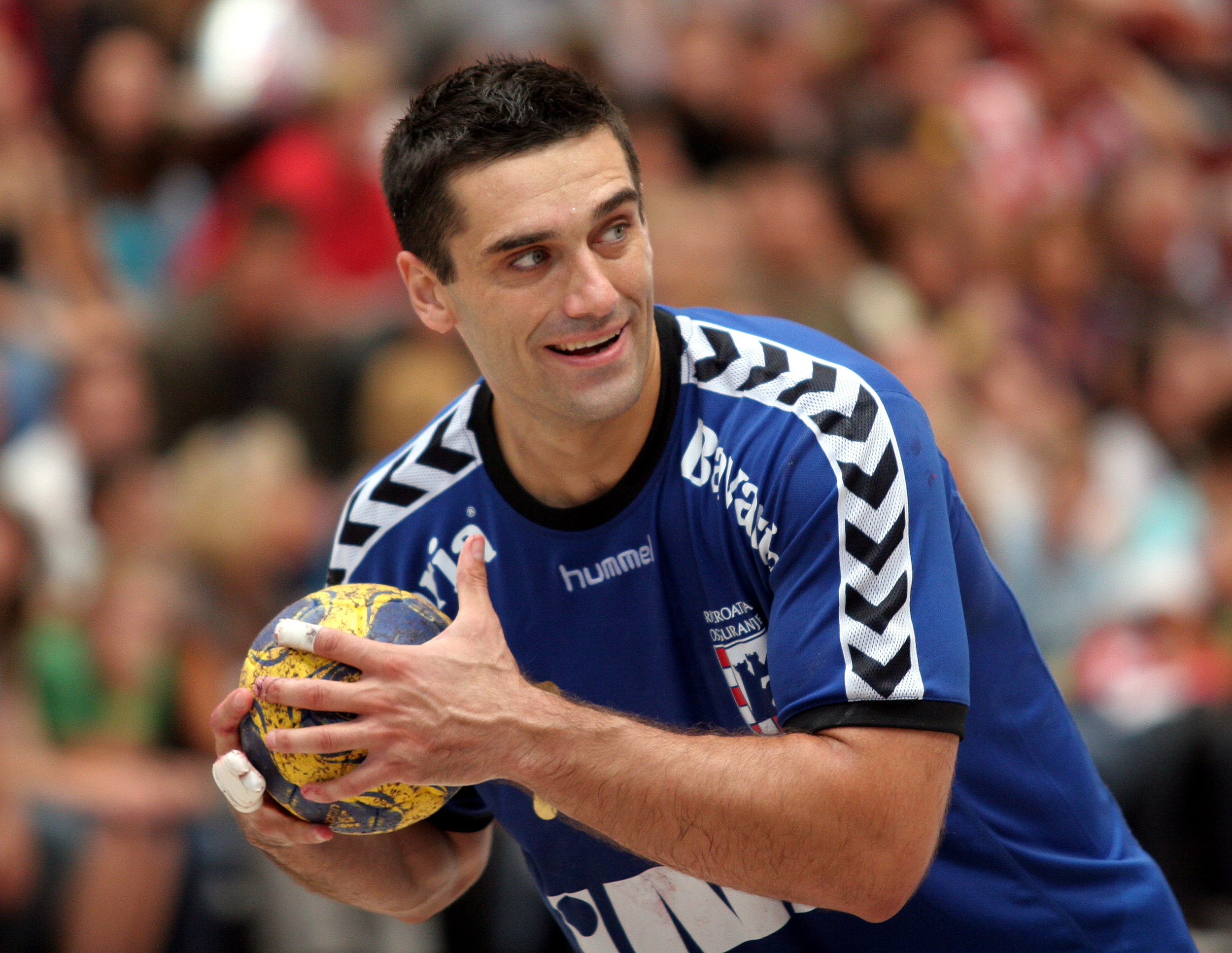
Kiril Lazarov of North Macedonia holds the record for most goals per game.

In total on male side, 27 handballers to date have scored 1000 or more goals for their national teams at senior level.

A vast majority of the players who scored at least 1000 goals, are from the modern era of the sport. This is partly because fewer games were played at international level than today. Péter Kovács held the record for most goals scored, until Guðjón Valur Sigurðsson beat his record in 2018. France is the country with the most entries on this list, with four players having scored 1000 or more goals. Only two players on this list have played for two different federations. Frank-Michael Wahl scored 1338 goals for East Germany and 74 goals for the German national team, also Talant Duyshebaev, who scored 726 goals for USSR, Unified Team and Russia and 569 goals for Spain. Only goals scored at the highest international level are included, meaning goals for national junior and youth teams are not. Only one player scoring more than 1000 goals managed to reach a goals per game ratio 7.0 and above, while the lowest ratio is 3.09. Out of 27 players to score 1000 or more goals in history, only 10 of them have won the World Championship at least once. Ahmed El-Ahmar is the only non-European player to appear on this list.

== By player ==
- updated as of 29 January 2024

Players in bold are still active.

=== Men's handball ===
Rank	Player	Goals	Ratio
1	(Iceland) Guðjón Valur Sigurðsson	1879	5.15
2	(Hungary) Péter Kovács	1797	5.56
3	(North Macedonia) Kiril Lazarov	1728	7.32
4	(Iceland) Ólafur Stefánsson	1570	4.76
5	(Denmark) Lars Christiansen	1503	4.45
6	(France) Jérôme Fernandez	1463	3.75
7	(Portugal) Carlos Resende	1444	5.78
8	(Egypt) Ahmed El-Ahmar	1425	4.43
9	(Romania) Vasile Stîngă	1414	5.26
10	(East Germany) (Germany) Frank-Michael Wahl	1412	4.1
11	(Denmark) Mikkel Hansen	1387	5.03
12	(Italy) Settimio Massotti	1371	4.54
13	(Soviet Union) (Unified Team at the Olympics) (Russia) (Spain) Talant Duyshebaev	1342	—
14	(France) Nikola Karabatić	1293	3.63
15	(Sweden) Magnus Wislander	1191	3.09
16	(Poland) Jerzy Klempel	1170	5.6
17	(Sweden) Stefan Lövgren	1138	4.25
18	(Iceland) Kristján Arason	1123	4.58
19	(Russia) Eduard Koksharov	1110	4.91
20	(Switzerland) Andy Schmid	1094	5.02
21	(Switzerland) Marc Baumgartner	1093	6.47
22	(Austria) Andreas Dittert	1089	5.36
23	(Romania) Robert Licu	1054	4.34
24	(Sweden) Per Carlén	1026	3.14
25	(France) Michaël Guigou	1021	3.33
26	(France) Frédéric Volle	1016	4.22
27	(Denmark) Erik Veje Rasmussen	1015	4.36

== See also ==
- European Men's Handball Championship
- List of European Cup and EHF Champions League top scorers
- List of women's handballers with 1000 or more international goals
- World Men's Handball Championship
