= Vladimir Belov (handballer) =

Soviet handball player

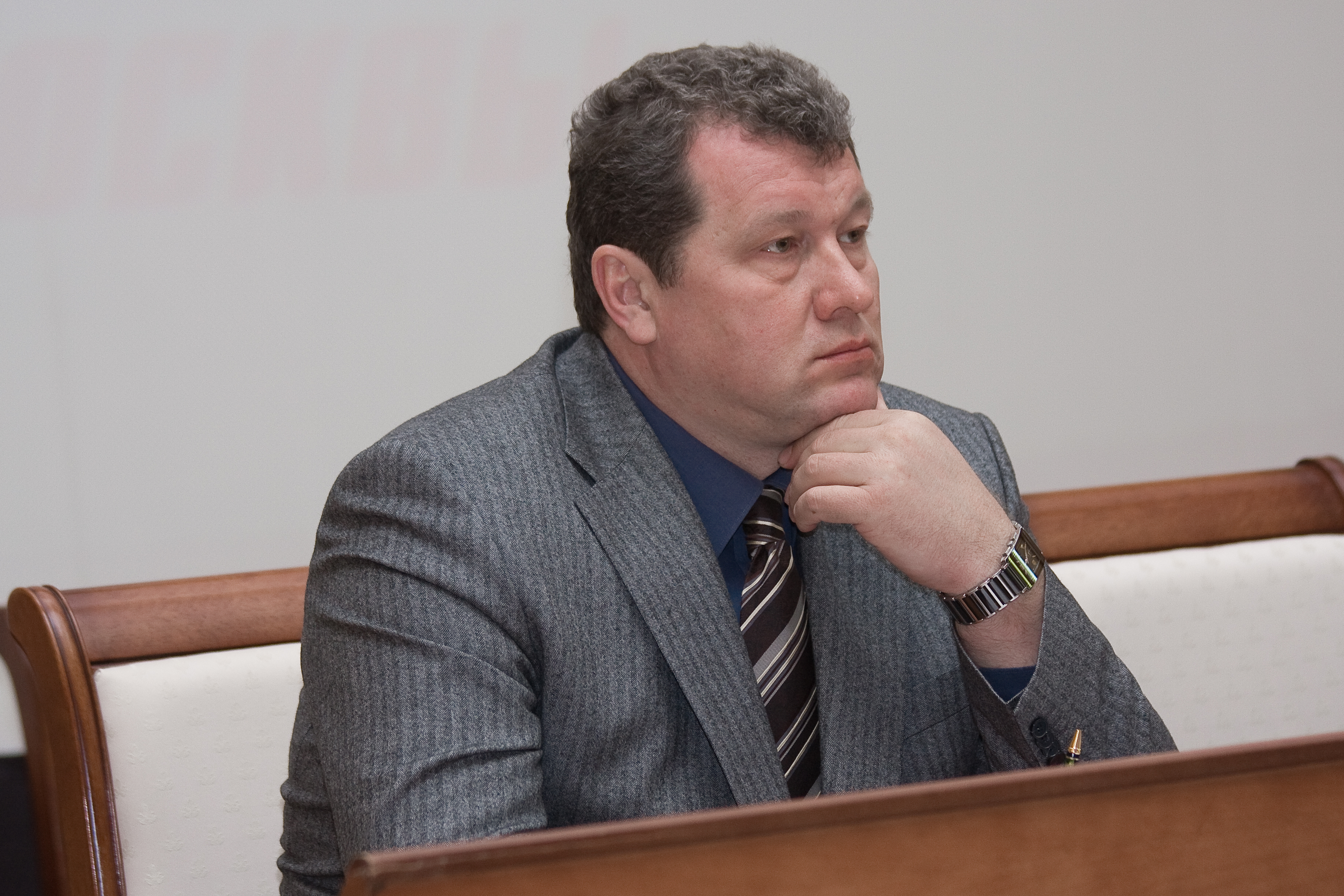
- Vladimir Belov, 2008

Personal information
- Full name: Vladimir Borisovich Belov
- Nationality: Russia
- Born: 26 April 1958 Kuntsevo District, Moscow, Russi
- Died: 14 November 2016 (aged 58)
- Height: 195 cm (77 in)

Sport
- Sport: Handball
- Position: Centre back

Youth career
- Years: Team
- –: SK Kuntzevo
National team
Years	Team	Apps
1977-?	Soviet Union	162
Medal record
Representing the Soviet Union
Olympic Games
Men's Handball
Silver medal – second place	1980 Moscow	Team
World championship
Silver medal – second place	1978 Denmark	Team
Gold medal – first place	1982 West Germany	Team

Vladimir Borisovich Belov (Russian: Владимир Борисович Белов, 26 April 1958 – 14 November 2016) was a Soviet/Russian handball player who competed in the 1980 Summer Olympics.

In 1980 he won the silver medal with the Soviet team. He played in all six matches and scored 22 goals.
