= Karshakevich =

Karshakevich (Belarusian: Каршакевіч) is a surname. Notable people with the surname include:

- Aleksandr Karshakevich (born 1959), Belarusian footballer
- Valery Karshakevich (born 1988), Belarusian footballer
