= Aleksandr Karshakevich =

Belarusian handball player

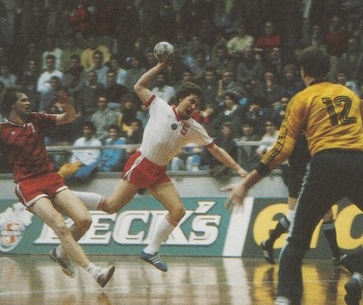
- Aleksandr Karshakevich (1987)

Personal information
- Full name: Aleksandr Vladimirovich Karshakevich
- Born: 6 April 1959 (age 67) Ashmyany, Hrodna Voblast, Byelorussian SSR, USSR
- Height: 184 cm (72 in)

Sport
- Sport: Handball
- Position: Left wing

Senior clubs
- Years: Team
- 1979-1990: SKA Minsk
- 1990-1994: DJK Hürth Gleuel
National team
- Years: Team
- –: Soviet Union
Medal record
Men's handball
Representing Soviet Union
Olympic Games
Gold medal – first place	1988 Seoul	Team
Silver medal – second place	1980 Moscow	Team
World Championships
Gold medal – first place	1982 West Germany	Team
Silver medal – second place	1990 Czechoslovakia	Team

Aleksandr Vladimirovich Karshakevich (Belarusian: Аляксандр Уладзіміравіч Каршакевіч; Russian: Александр Владимирович Каршакевич, born 6 April 1959 in Ashmyany, Hrodna Voblast) is a former Soviet/Belarusian handball player who competed in the 1980 Summer Olympics and in the 1988 Summer Olympics.

In 1980, he won the silver medal with the Soviet team. He played four matches including the final and scored 13 goals.

Eight years later he won the gold medal with the Soviet team. He played five matches including the final and scored twenty goals.

At club level he played for SKA Minsk and won the Soviet Championship in 1981, 1984, 1985, 1986, 1988 and 1990. At European level he won the European Cup in 1987 1989 and 1990. He also won the EHF Cup Winners' Cup in 1983 and 1988.
