= Ólafur Stefánsson =

Icelandic handball player (born 1973)

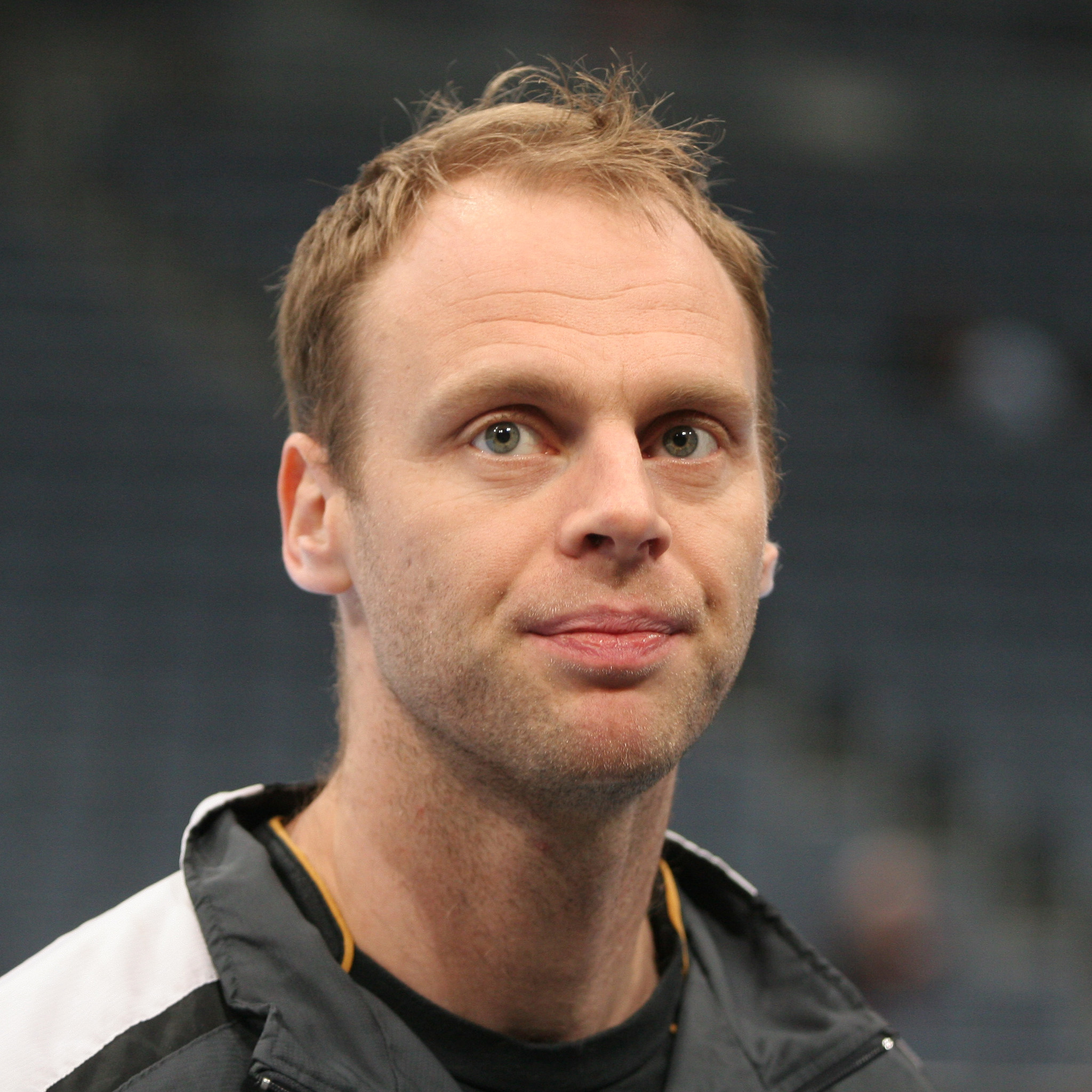

Personal information
- Full name: Ólafur Indriði Stefánsson
- Born: 3 July 1973 (age 53) Reykjavík, Iceland
- Height: 6 ft 5 in (1.96 m)

Sport
- Sport: Handball
- Position: Right back
- Current club: HC Erlangen (assistant coach)

Youth career
- Years: Team
- 1984–1992: Valur

Senior clubs
- Years: Team
- 1992–1996: Valur
- 1996–1998: LTV Wuppertal
- 1998–2003: SC Magdeburg
- 2003–2009: BM Ciudad Real
- 2009–2011: Rhein-Neckar Löwen
- 2011–2012: AG København
- 2012–2013: Lekhwiya
- 2015: KIF Kolding
National team
Years	Team	Apps	(Gls)
1992–2013	Iceland	330	(1570)

Teams managed
- 2013: Valur
- 2015–2016: Iceland (assistant)
- 2022–: Erlangen (assistant)
Medal record
Representing Iceland
Men's Handball
Summer Olympics
Silver medal – second place	2008 Beijing	Team competition
European Championship
Bronze medal – third place	2010 Austria	Team competition

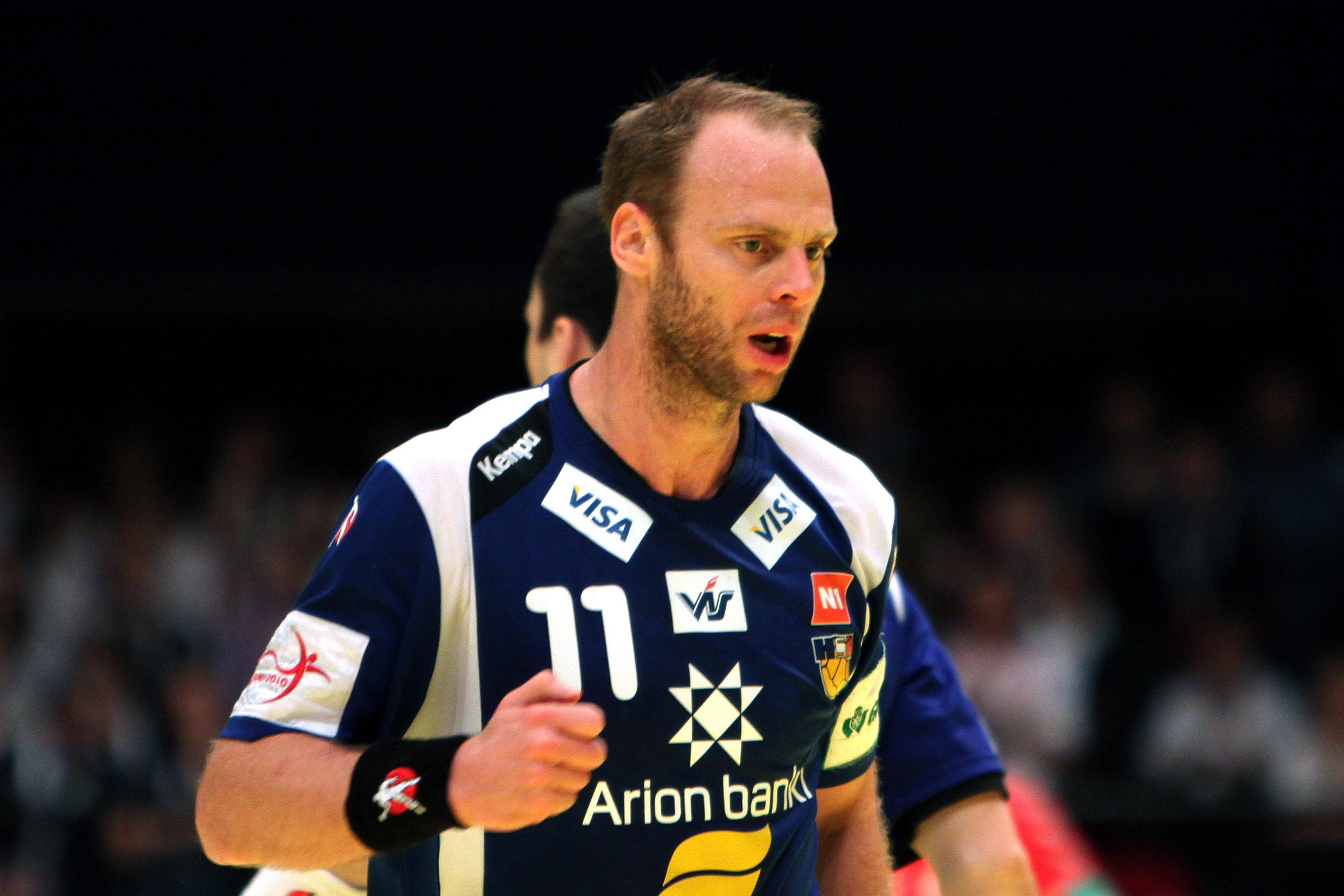
Ólafur Stefánsson

Ólafur Indriði Stefánsson (born 3 July 1973) is an Icelandic former handball player who for many years was the captain of the Iceland men's national handball team but announced his international retirement after the 2012 London Olympics. His position was right back. At his peak he was considered to be one of the very best handball players in the world.

As a player for his national team, his goal tally of 1570 is fourth only to Gudjon Valur Sigurdsson, Péter Kovács and Kiril Lazarov. He is also one of the most enduring handball players of all times, having been a senior field player from 1992 until 2015.

He was voted Icelandic Sportsperson of the Year in 2002, 2003, 2008 and 2009. He won silver with the Icelandic handball team at the 2008 Beijing Olympics, as well as bronze at the 2010 European Championship.

== Career in clubs ==
Ólafur's career started with the Reykjavík based sports club Valur. With Valur, Ólafur became Icelandic champion 5 times. After Valur, he transferred to the Bundesliga, playing with LTV Wuppertal, then coached by Icelandic coach Viggó Sigurðsson. Later the joined another Icelandic coach, Alfreð Gíslason in SC Magdeburg. In 2003, Ólafur was transferred to top Spanish club BM Ciudad Real. At the pinnacle of his career, Ólafur Stefánsson enjoyed massive success with Ciudad, winning both the Champions League and the Spanish title multiple times. In 2009 he went back to Germany to play with Rhein-Neckar Löwen, then coached by Icelandic national team coach, Guðmundur Guðmundsson. On 1 July 2011 he signed for AG København, but after the club filed for bankruptcy in the summer of 2012 he was without a club for the remainder of the year. On 7 December his agent announced he had signed for the Lekhwiya Handball Team in Doha, Qatar.

Since March 2022 Ólafur works as assistant coach at Erlangen .

== Career on the national team ==
In 1995, he was selected to play on the Iceland men's national handball team to take part in the world championships, which were held in Iceland.

He was captain for the national handball team on the 2008 Summer Olympics in Beijing (where Iceland won the silver medal), and again at the 2010 European Championship where Iceland finished third.

== Family ==
He is the brother of Icelandic basketball player Jón Arnór Stefánsson and former footballer Eggert Stefánsson who played with Fram in Úrvalsdeild karla.

== Honours ==
=== Valur Reykjavík ===
- Icelandic champion: 1991, 1993, 1994, 1995, 1996
- Icelandic cup: 1993

=== SC Magdeburg ===
- Bundesliga: 2001
- DHB-Supercup: 2001
- Champions League: 2002
- EHF Cup: 1999, 2001
- EHF Men's Champions Trophy: 2001, 2002

=== BM Ciudad Real ===
- Liga ASOBAL : 2004, 2007, 2008, 2009
- Copa ASOBAL: 2004, 2005, 2006, 2007, 2008
- Supercopa ASOBAL: 2005, 2008
- EHF Champions League: 2006, 2008, 2009
- EHF Men's Champions Trophy: 2005, 2006

=== AG København ===
- Danish Handball League : 2012
- Danish Cup: 2011

=== International ===
- 5th place at 1997 World Championship
- 4th place at 2002 European Championship
- 2nd at 2008 Olympic Games
- 3rd place at 2010 European Championship

==== Individual ====
- Icelandic Sports Personality of the Year: 2002, 2003, 2008, 2009
- Top Scorer at 2002 European Championship
- Top Scorer in Magdeburg's history
- Top Scorer in 2007-08 EHF Champions League
- Top Scorer at BM Ciudad Real in 2002-03 season
- Selected in 2002 European Championship All Star Team
- Selected in 2004 Olympic Games All Star Team
- Selected in 2008 Olympic Games All Star Team
- Selected in 2010 European Championship All Star Team

==== Orders and special awards ====
- Order of the Falcon - Knight Grand Cross in 2008

== International goals ==
No.	Date	Venue	Opponent	Score	Result	Competition
1.	21 January 2000	Rijeka, Croatia	Sweden	6–9	23–31	2000 European Men's Handball Championship
2.	21 January 2000	Rijeka, Croatia	Sweden	11–20	23–31	2000 European Men's Handball Championship
3.	21 January 2000	Rijeka, Croatia	Sweden	22–30	23–31	2000 European Men's Handball Championship
4.	22 January 2000	Rijeka, Croatia	Portugal	5–2	25–28	2000 European Men's Handball Championship
5.	22 January 2000	Rijeka, Croatia	Portugal	9–7	25–28	2000 European Men's Handball Championship
6.	22 January 2000	Rijeka, Croatia	Portugal	12–11	25–28	2000 European Men's Handball Championship
7.	22 January 2000	Rijeka, Croatia	Portugal	19–22	25–28	2000 European Men's Handball Championship
8.	22 January 2000	Rijeka, Croatia	Portugal	20–24	25–28	2000 European Men's Handball Championship
9.	23 January 2000	Rijeka, Croatia	Russia	1–0	23–25	2000 European Men's Handball Championship
10.	23 January 2000	Rijeka, Croatia	Russia	11–12	23–25	2000 European Men's Handball Championship
11.	23 January 2000	Rijeka, Croatia	Russia	20–23	23–25	2000 European Men's Handball Championship
12.	25 January 2000	Zagreb, Croatia	Denmark	5–3	24–26	2000 European Men's Handball Championship
13.	25 January 2000	Zagreb, Croatia	Denmark	7–6	24–26	2000 European Men's Handball Championship
14.	25 January 2000	Zagreb, Croatia	Denmark	17–14	24–26	2000 European Men's Handball Championship
15.	25 January 2000	Zagreb, Croatia	Denmark	21–22	24–26	2000 European Men's Handball Championship
16.	27 January 2000	Zagreb, Croatia	Slovenia	3–3	26–27	2000 European Men's Handball Championship
17.	27 January 2000	Zagreb, Croatia	Slovenia	5–6	26–27	2000 European Men's Handball Championship
18.	27 January 2000	Zagreb, Croatia	Slovenia	9–10	26–27	2000 European Men's Handball Championship
19.	27 January 2000	Zagreb, Croatia	Slovenia	20–19	26–27	2000 European Men's Handball Championship
20.	29 January 2000	Rijeka, Croatia	Ukraine	8–6	26–25	2000 European Men's Handball Championship
21.	29 January 2000	Rijeka, Croatia	Ukraine	9–7	26–25	2000 European Men's Handball Championship
22.	29 January 2000	Rijeka, Croatia	Ukraine	25–24	26–25	2000 European Men's Handball Championship

== See also ==
- List of men's handballers with 1000 or more international goals
