= List of European Cup and EHF Champions League top scorers =

== All-time top scorers (including qualifying rounds) ==
	Player	Country	Goals	Years	Clubs
1	Kiril Lazarov	(North Macedonia)	**1306**	1998–	Pelister, MKB Veszprém, Zagreb, Atlético Madrid, Barcelona, HBC Nantes
2	Nikola Karabatic	(France)	**1038**	2002–	Montpellier, THW Kiel, FC Barcelona, Paris Saint-Germain
3	Momir Ilić	(Serbia)	1033	2004–2019	Gorenje, VfL Gummersbach THW Kiel, MKB Veszprém
4	Marko Vujin	(Serbia)	**898**	2006–	MKB Veszprém, THW Kiel
5	Siarhei Rutenka	(Belarus)	862	2001–2016	Celje Pivovarna Laško, Ciudad Real, Barcelona
6	Uwe Gensheimer	(Germany)	**851**	2007–	Rhein-Neckar Löwen, Paris Saint-Germain
7	Timur Dibirov	(Russia)	**840**	2004–	Chehovski Medvedi, RK Vardar
8	László Nagy	(Hungary)	818	2000–2019	Barcelona, MKB Veszprém
9	Mikkel Hansen	(Denmark)	**780**	2007–	GOG Svendborg, Barcelona, AG København, Paris Saint-Germain
10	Vid Kavtičnik	(Slovenia)	**725**	2004–	RK Gorenje Velenje, THW Kiel, Montpellier

Bold:	Still active in Europe.

Goalkeepers

1. (Spain) Gonzalo Perez de Vargas 25
2. (Denmark) Niklas Landin 19
3. (Sweden) Andreas Palicka 15
4. (France) Vincent Gérard 14
5. (Croatia) Marin Šego 10
6. (Spain) Sergey Hernández 9

== EHF Champions League Top Goalscorer by seasons ==
The top scorer award is for the player who amassed the most goals in the tournament, excluding the qualifying rounds.

Season	Player	Country	Club	Goals
1993–94	Uroš Šerbec	Slovenia	(Slovenia) RK Celje	76
1994–95	Nenad Peruničić	FR Yugoslavia	(Spain) CD Bidasoa	82
1995–96	Carlos Resende	Portugal	(Portugal) ABC Braga	80
1996–97	Carlos Resende (2)	Portugal	(Portugal) ABC Braga (2)	82
1997–98	József Éles	Hungary	(Hungary) Veszprém KC	84
1998–99	Zlatko Saračević	Croatia	(Croatia) RK Zagreb	90
1999–00	Zlatko Saračević (2)	Croatia	(Croatia) RK Zagreb (2)	92
2000–01	Yuriy Kostetskiy	Ukraine	(Portugal) ABC Braga (3)	81
2001–02	Nenad Peruničić (2)	FR Yugoslavia	(Germany) SC Magdeburg	83
2002–03	Mirza Džomba	Croatia	(Hungary) Veszprém KC (2)	67
2003–04	Siarhei Rutenka	Belarus	(Slovenia) RK Celje (2)	86
2004–05	Siarhei Rutenka (2)	Belarus	(Slovenia) RK Celje (3)	95
2005–06	Kiril Lazarov	North Macedonia	(Hungary) Veszprém KC (3)	85
2006–07	Nikola Karabatic	France	(Germany) THW Kiel	89
2007–08	Kiril Lazarov (2)	North Macedonia	(Croatia) RK Zagreb (3)	96
2007–08	Ólafur Stefánsson	Iceland	(Spain) BM Ciudad Real	96
2008–09	Filip Jícha	Czech Republic	(Germany) THW Kiel (2)	99
2009–10	Filip Jícha (2)	Czech Republic	(Germany) THW Kiel (3)	119
2010–11	Uwe Gensheimer	Germany	(Germany) Rhein-Neckar Löwen	118
2011–12	Mikkel Hansen	Denmark	(Denmark) AG København	98
2012–13	Hans Lindberg	Denmark	(Germany) HSV Hamburg	101
2013–14	Momir Ilić	Serbia	(Hungary) Veszprém KC (4)	103
2014–15	Momir Ilić (2)	Serbia	(Hungary) Veszprém KC (5)	114
2015–16	Mikkel Hansen (2)	Denmark	(France) Paris Saint-Germain	141
2016–17	Uwe Gensheimer (2)	Germany	(France) Paris Saint-Germain (2)	115
2017–18	Uwe Gensheimer (3)	Germany	(France) Paris Saint-Germain (3)	92
2018–19	Alex Dujshebaev	Spain	(Poland) Vive Targi Kielce	99
2019–20	Niclas Ekberg	Sweden	(Germany) THW Kiel (4)	85
2020–21	Valero Rivera Folch	Spain	(France) HBC Nantes	95
2021–22	Aleix Gómez	Spain	(Spain) FC Barcelona	104
2022–23	Emil Wernsdorf Madsen	Denmark	(Denmark) GOG Håndbold	107
2023–24	Kamil Syprzak	Poland	(France) Paris Saint-Germain (4)	112
2024–25	Mathias Gidsel	Denmark	(Germany) Füchse Berlin (1)	133
2025–26	Mathias Gidsel (2)	Denmark	(Germany) Füchse Berlin (2)	161

=== Most goals in a season (≥100) ===
As of the end of 2025/26 season

Player	Goals	Season	Position	Sn with ≥100 goals
(Denmark) Mathias Gidsel	161	2025/26	OB	2
(Denmark) Mikkel Hansen	141	2015/16	OB	2
(Portugal) Francisco Costa	136	2025/26	OB	1
(Croatia) Mario Šoštarić	130	2024/25	W	1
(Serbia) Momir Ilić	120	2015/16	OB	3
(France) Elohim Prandi	120	2025/26	OB	1
(Czech Republic) Filip Jícha	119	2009/10	OB	1
(Germany) Uwe Gensheimer	118	2010/11	W	1
(Spain) Aleix Gómez	117	2025/26	W	2
(Denmark) Frederik Bjerre	116	2025/26	W	1
(Denmark) Lasse Andersson	115	2024/25	OB	1
(Poland) Kamil Syprzak	112	2023/24	P	3
(Portugal) Martim Costa	112	2025/26	OB	2
(North Macedonia) Kiril Lazarov	109	2015/16	OB	2
(Denmark) Emil Madsen	107	2022/23	OB	1
(France) Dika Mem	106	2023/24	OB	2
(France) Melvyn Richardson	103	2025/26	OB	1
(Serbia) Marko Vujin	103	2015/16	OB	1
(Slovenia) Dean Bombač	101	2015/16	OB	1
(Denmark) Hans Lindberg	101	2012/13	W	1
(Poland) Arkadiusz Moryto	100	2022/23	W	1

Goalkeeper with most goals in a single season is (Spain) Gonzalo Perez de Vargas: 7 goals in 2020/21.

== Statistics ==
=== By player ===
Players with 2 or more titles:

Country	Titles	Seasons
(Germany) Uwe Gensheimer	3	2010–11, 2016–17, 2017–18
(Portugal) Carlos Resende	2	1995–96, 1996–97
(Croatia) Zlatko Saračević	2	1998–99, 1999–00
(Federal Republic of Yugoslavia) Nenad Peruničić	2	1994–95, 2000–01
(Belarus) Siarhei Rutenka	2	2003–04, 2004–05
(North Macedonia) Kiril Lazarov	2	2005–06, 2007–08
(Czech Republic) Filip Jícha	2	2008–09, 2009–10
(Serbia) Momir Ilić	2	2013–14, 2014–15
(Denmark) Mikkel Hansen	2	2011–12, 2015–16
(Denmark) Mathias Gidsel	2	2024–25, 2025–26

=== By country ===
Countries with 2 or more titles:

Country	Titles
Denmark	6
Croatia	3
Germany	3
Spain	3
North Macedonia	2
FR Yugoslavia	2
Portugal	2
Belarus	2
Czech Republic	2
Serbia	2

=== By club ===
Clubs with 2 or more titles:

Country	Titles	Seasons
(Hungary) Veszprém KC	5	1997–98, 2002–03, 2005–06, 2013–14, 2014–15
(Germany) THW Kiel	4	2006–07, 2008–09, 2009–10, 2019–20
(France) Paris Saint-Germain	4	2015–16, 2016–17, 2017–18, 2023-24
(Portugal) ABC Braga	3	1995–96, 1996–97, 2000–01
(Slovenia) RK Celje	3	1993–94, 2003–04, 2004–05
(Croatia) RK Zagreb	3	1998–99, 1999–00, 2007–08
