= Aleksey Zhuk =

Soviet handball player

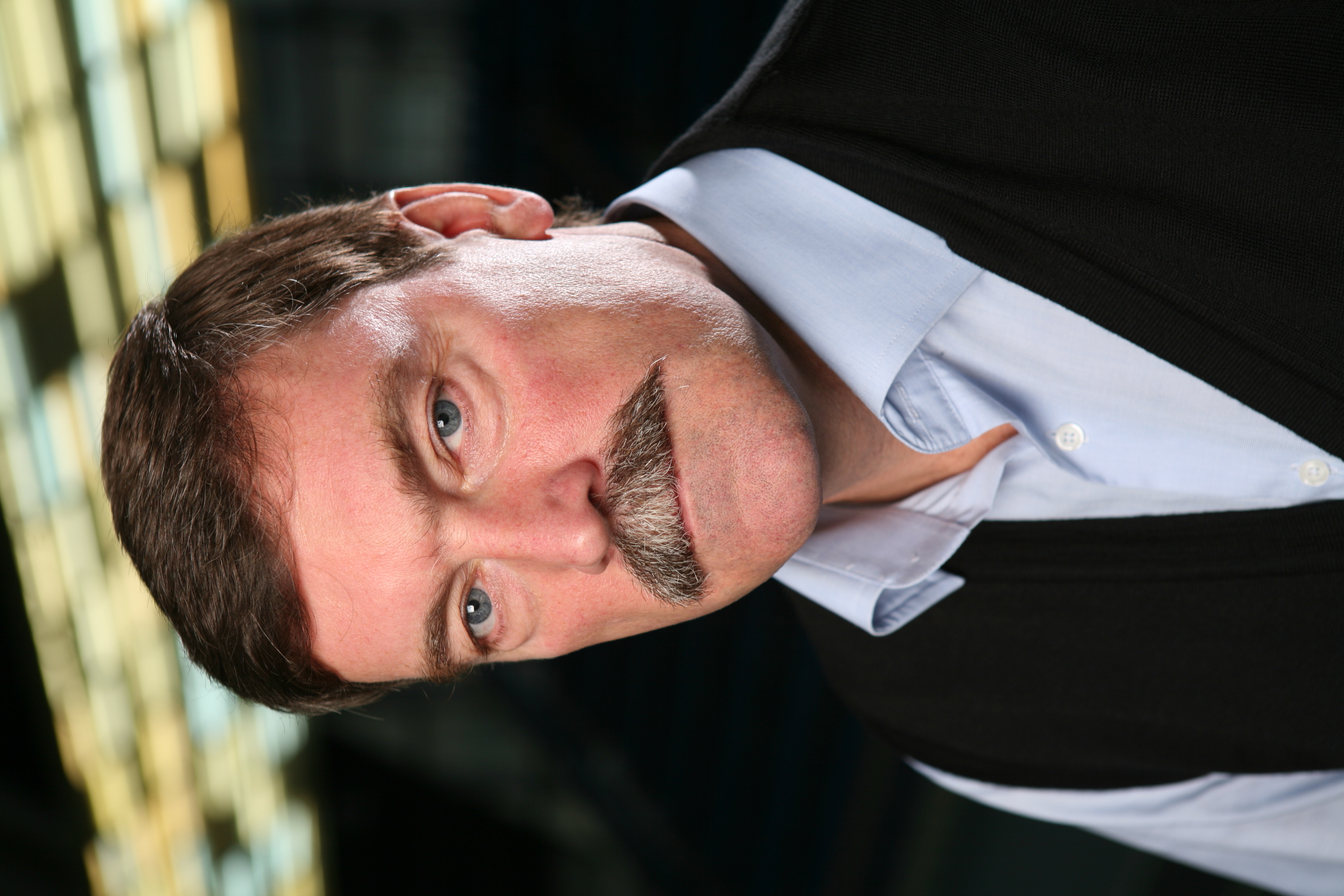

Medal record

Representing the Soviet Union

Olympic Games

Men's Handball
Silver medal – second place	1980 Moscow	Team

World championship
Silver medal – second place	1978 Denmark	Team

Aleksey Vladimirovich Zhuk (Russian: Алексей Владимирович Жук, born November 6, 1955) is a former Soviet/Russian handball player who competed in the 1980 Summer Olympics.

In 1980 he won the silver medal with the Soviet team. He played all six matches and scored twenty goals.

He was a handball player for CSKA Moscow between 1974 and 1987 and since 1987 he served in the administrative side of CSKA. He is the head trainer and chief of CSKA tennis team since 1994. He is also an adviser to the general director of Alexander Ostrovsky Academy in sports issues.
