= Per Carlén =

Swedish handball player (born 1960)

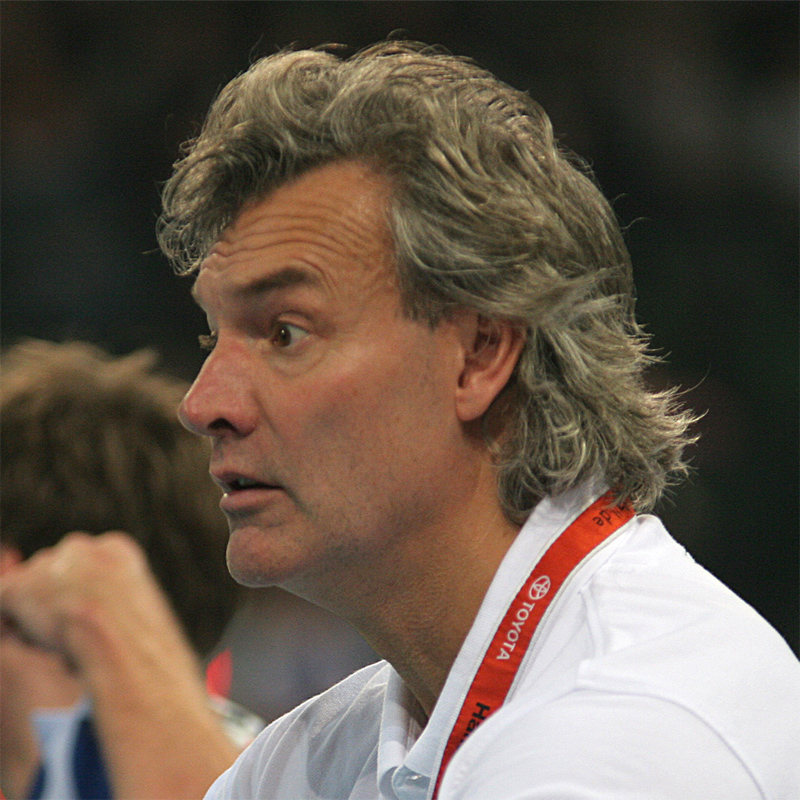
- Per Carlén (2011)

Personal information
- Nationality: Swedish
- Born: 19 November 1960 (age 65) Karlstad, Sweden
- Height: 1.95 m (6 ft 5 in)

Sport
- Sport: Handball
- Position: Pivot

Youth career
- Years: Team
- –: IF Hellton

Senior clubs
- Years: Team
- 1978–1979: HK Drott
- 1982–1983: IK Heim
- 1983–1985: HP Warta
- 1985–1989: BM Granollers
- 1989–1991: Atlético Madrid
- 1991–2000: Ystads IF
National team
Years	Team	Apps	(Gls)
1982–1996	Sweden	327	(1026)

Teams managed
- 2006–2007: TSV St. Otmar St. Gallen
- 2007–2008: IFK Malmö
- 2008–2010: SG Flensburg-Handewitt
- 2011: HSV Hamburg
- 2013–2014: Bjerringbro-Silkeborg
- 2015–2016: Israel men's national team
Medal record
Olympic Games
Silver medal – second place	1996 Atlanta	Team competition
Silver medal – second place	1992 Barcelona	Team competition
World Championship
Gold medal – first place	1990 Czechoslovakia	Team competition
Bronze medal – third place	1993 Sweden	Team competition
Bronze medal – third place	1995 Iceland	Team competition
European Championship
Gold medal – first place	1994 Portugal	Team competition

Per Carlén (born 19 November 1960) is a Swedish former handball player and current coach. He is the father of Swedish national handball player Oscar Carlén and Swedish national football player Hilda Carlén. His most recent coaching job was with the defending German champion HSV Hamburg, who sacked him on 29 December 2011.

== Player career ==
Along with, among others, Magnus Wislander, Staffan Olsson, Erik Hajas och Björn Jilsén, Carlén was a key player in Bengt Johansson's successful national team during the 1980s and 1990s. Usually Carlén played line player. During his national career he played 329 games (1032 goals). Ona club level he represented IK Heim, Ystads IF, BM Granollers and Atlético Madrid BM. In 1992 Carlén won a national championship with Ystads IF.

=== Player clubs ===
- IFK Skoghall
- HK Drott
- IF Hellton
- IK Heim
- HP Warta
- BM Granollers
- Atlético Madrid BM
- Ystads IF HF

=== Coaching clubs ===
- TSV St. Otmar St. Gallen, 2006–2007
- HK Malmö, 2007–2008
- SG Flensburg-Handewitt, 2008–2010
- HSV Hamburg, 2011

== Resume ==
- Caps/Goals: 329/1032 mål (1982–1996)
- World champion 1990 (in Prague, Czechoslovakia)
- European champion 1994
- 3rd place in the 1993 and 1995 World championships
- Swedish champion with Ystads IF HF 1992
- Participated in four Summer Olympics: Los Angeles (1984), Seoul (1988), Barcelona (1992) and Atlanta (1996)

== See also ==
- List of men's handballers with 1000 or more international goals
