= Ryszard Jedliński =

Polish handball player (1953–2023)

Personal information
- Nationality: Polish
- Born: 9 September 1953 Płock, Poland
- Died: 17 September 2023 (aged 70)
- Height: 1.80 m (5 ft 11 in)

Sport
- Sport: Handball
- Position: Pivot

Senior clubs
- Years: Team
- 1966–1972: Wisła Płock
- 1972–1982: AZS-AWF Warszawa
National team
Years	Team	Apps	(Gls)
1969–1976	Poland	85	(125)
Medal record
World Championship
Bronze medal – third place	1982 West Germany

Ryszard Grzegorz Jedliński (9 September 1953 – 17 September 2023) was a Polish handball player who competed in the 1980 Summer Olympics and at the 1982 World Men's Handball Championship.

In 1980 he was part of the Polish team which finished seventh in the Olympic tournament.

Jedliński died on 17 September 2023, at the age of 70.
