= Eugenio Serrano =

Spanish handball player (born 1960)

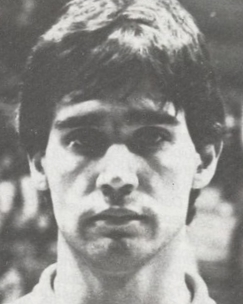
- Serrano in 1986

Personal information
- Full name: Eugenio Serrano Gispert
- Nationality: Spain
- Born: 14 April 1960 (age 66) Barcelona, Spain
- Height: 192 cm (76 in)

Sport
- Sport: Handball
- Position: Right wing

Youth career
- Years: Team
- 1970-1976: Sant Joan Bosco
- 1977: University of Barcelona

Senior clubs
- Years: Team
- 1977-1979: BM Granollers
- 1979-1994: FC Barcelona Handbol
National team
Years	Team	Apps	(Gls)
1979-1994	Spain	231	(622)

Eugenio Serrano Gispert (born April 14, 1960) is a former Spanish handball player who competed in the 1980, 1984 and 1988 Summer Olympics.

== Career ==
Serrano started playing handball at his school Sant Joan Bosco. After a year at Barcelona University, he joined BM Granollers in the top league in Spain. Two years after he joined FC Barcelona, where he played for 15 years. With the club he won the Spanish championship 8 times, the Copa del Rey de Balonmano 7 times, the Catalan league 9 times and the Spanish supercup 6 times. He also won the EHF Cup Winners' Cup 4 times and the EHF Champions League once.

=== National team ===
Serrano debuted for the Spanish national on January 13th 1979 in 21:23 loss against Czechoslovakia.

In 1979 he won the B-team world cup.

In 1980, he was part of the Spanish team which finished fifth in the Olympic tournament. He played all six matches and scored twenty goals.

At the 1982 World Men's Handball Championship he finished 8th with the Spanish team, scoring 11 goals in 8 matches.

Two years later, he finished eighth with the Spanish team in the 1984 Olympic tournament. He played all six matches and scored 14 goals.

At the 1986 World Men's Handball Championship he scored 28 goals in 5 games, and Spain finished 5th.

In 1988, he was a member of the Spanish team which finished ninth in the Olympic tournament. He played all six matches and scored 24 goals.

== Outside the pitch ==
Serrano has a degree in Economy.

He has also coached handball at a grassroots level.

== Titles ==
- EHF Champions League: 1991
- EHF Cup Winners' Cup: 1984, 1985, 1986, 1994
- Spanish Championships: 1980, 1982, 1986, 1988, 1989, 1990, 1991, 1992
- Copa del Rey: 1983, 1984, 1985, 1987, 1990, 1993, 1994
- Spanish Supercup: 1986, 1988, 1989, 1990, 1991, 1993
- Catalan League: 1982, 1983, 1985, 1987, 1988, 1991, 1992, 1993
- B-World Championship: Gold 1979
