= Jerzy Garpiel =

Polish handball player (born 1957)

Personal information
- Nationality: Polish
- Born: 16 February 1957 (age 69) Kraków, Poland
- Height: 1.92 m (6 ft 4 in)

Sport
- Sport: Handball
- Position: Left back

Senior clubs
- Years: Team
- 1975–1985: Hutnik Kraków
- 1985–1994: TV Gelnhausen
National team
Years	Team	Apps	(Gls)
1979–1984	Poland	159	(280)
Medal record
World Championship
Bronze medal – third place	1982 West Germany

Jerzy Garpiel (born 16 February 1957) is a former Polish handball player who competed in the 1980 Summer Olympics and at the 1982 World Men's Handball Championship.

In 1980 he was part of the Polish team which finished seventh in the Olympic tournament.
