= Guðjón Valur Sigurðsson =

Icelandic handball player (born 1979)

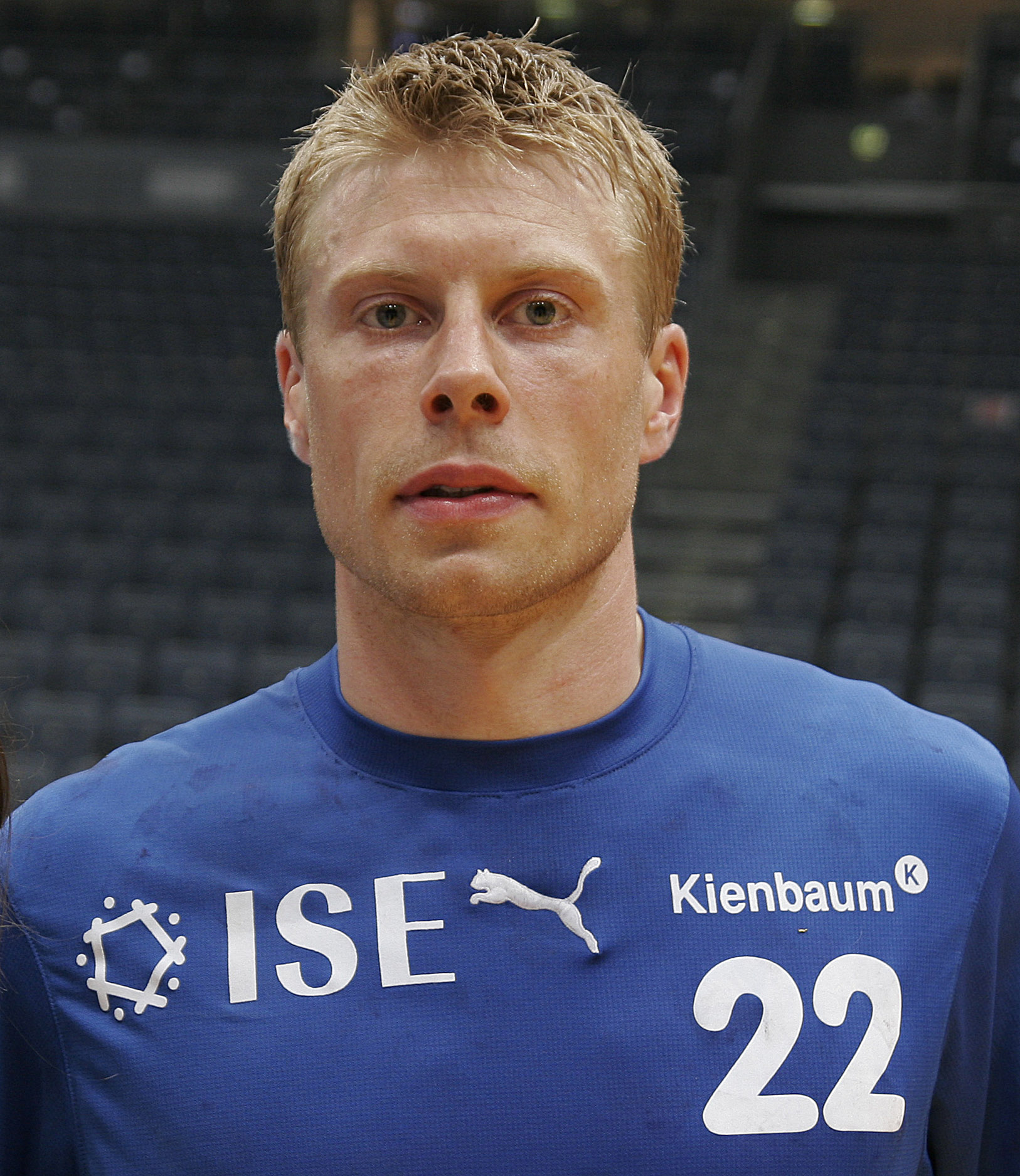
- Guðjón with Gummersbach in 2007

Personal information
- Nationality: Icelandic
- Born: 8 August 1979 (age 47) Reykjavík, Iceland
- Height: 1.87 m (6 ft 2 in)

Sport
- Sport: Handball
- Position: Left wing
- Current club: VfL Gummersbach (Manager)

Senior clubs
- Years: Team
- 1998–2001: KA Akureyri
- 2001–2005: TUSEM Essen
- 2005–2008: VfL Gummersbach
- 2008–2011: Rhein-Neckar Löwen
- 2011–2012: AG København
- 2012–2014: THW Kiel
- 2014–2016: FC Barcelona
- 2016–2019: Rhein-Neckar Löwen
- 2019–2020: Paris Saint-Germain
National team
Years	Team	Apps	(Gls)
1999–2020	Iceland	365	(1879)

Teams managed
- 2020–: VfL Gummersbach
Medal record
Olympic Games
Silver medal – second place	2008 Beijing	Team
European Championships
Bronze medal – third place	2010 Austria	Team

Guðjón Valur Sigurðsson (born 8 August 1979) is an Icelandic retired handball player and current coach of VfL Gummersbach. A captain of the Iceland men's national handball team, Guðjón Valur broke the world record for most goals scored in international men's handball in 2018. He won silver with the Icelandic handball team at the 2008 Beijing Olympics, as well as bronze at the 2010 European Championship.

He was included in the European Handball Federation Hall of Fame in 2023.

== Club career ==
Guðjón started his handball career at a young age with Grótta on Seltjarnarnes. He also played with KA Akureyri and lost the Icelandic championship final in 2001. KA won the championship final the year after he left. After that, he began his professional career in Germany with Essen. In 2005, Gudjón Valur won the European championship with Essen. Later that year, he joined Gummersbach. At Gummersbach, he was joined by the Icelandic national handball coach Alfreð Gíslason, former Icelandic sportsman of the year, who led Gummersbach's training from 2006 until 2008.

In April 2020, Guðjón announced his retirement from handball.

== International career ==
At the World Championship in handball in Germany in January–February 2007, Gudjón Valur scored the most goals (total of 66). He also played the most minutes of any player in the competition. On average, Gudjón Valur played 58 and a half minutes out of 60 in each game. However, the Icelandic team, which played well, was unlucky and ended in 8th place. Gudjón Valur is one of the most experienced players on the Icelandic national team. Guðjón Valur was named the Icelandic Sportsperson of the Year in 2006.

In August 2008 Guðjón Valur played with the Icelandic national team at the Olympics in Beijing, China and won the silver. Gudjon was second top scorer of the Icelandic national team with 43 goals and was named in a seven-man Excellent Olympics. In 2010 Gudjon Valur won his second award for the national team in the tournament when the Icelandic national team won the bronze in the Europe Championship in Austria 2010. Gudjon Valur also played with the Icelandic national team in World Championships in Sweden 2011 and was second top scorer of Iceland with 47 goals.

A year later, at the 2012 European Men's Handball Championship Guðjón played in top form again, being the best Icelandic scorer and the sixth overall of the tournament. The national team, however, slightly underperformed and finished only tenth, still Guðjón Valur made it to the All-Star team as the best left wing of the championship.

On 7 January 2018 playing against Germany, with 1798 goals in 343 matches Guðjón Valur broke the world record for most goals scored in international men's handball. At the end of his career he had scored a tally of 1879 goals in 365 matches for the Icelandic men's national handball team. The previous record holder was the Hungarian Péter Kovács, who scored 1797 goals for the Hungarian team.

== Managerial career ==
On 3 May 2020, it was announced that Guðjón would take over as manager of 2.Bundesliga club VfL Gummersbach. Guðjón had previously played for Gummersbach from 2005 to 2007. In 2021/2022 they won the 2.Bundesliga and were promoted to Bundesliga. In 2022/2023 he was awarded Trainer of the year in Bundesliga.

== See also ==
- List of men's handballers with 1000 or more international goals
