= Pavle Jurina =

Yugoslav handball player (1955-2011)

Personal information
- Born: 2 January 1955 Ledenik, PR Croatia, FPR Yugoslavia
- Died: 2 December 2011 (aged 56)
- Height: 1.94 m (6 ft 4 in)

Sport
- Sport: Handball
- Position: left back

Senior clubs
- Years: Team
- 1972–1976: (Socialist Federal Republic of Yugoslavia) Partizan Našice
- 1976–1984: (Socialist Federal Republic of Yugoslavia) Partizan Bjelovar
- 1984–1986: (Italy) SC Gaeta
- 1986–1987: (West Germany) TuS Schutterwald
National team
Years	Team	Apps
197x–198x	Yugoslavia	140

Teams managed
- –: SC Gaeta
- –: PM Città Sant'Angelo
- –: Handball Sassari
- –: PM Alcamo
Medal record
Olympics
Gold medal – first place	1984 Los Angeles
World Championship
Silver medal – second place	1982 West Germany
Mediterranean Games
Gold medal – first place	1979 Split
Gold medal – first place	1983 Casablanca

Pavle "Pavao" Jurina (2 January 1955 – 2 December 2011) was a Croatian handball player who competed in the 1980 Summer Olympics and in the 1984 Summer Olympics. He was elected three times as best Yugoslav player (1979, 1980 and 1982).

Jurina was born in Našice. Standing at 1.94 m, he debuted as a handball player with the local team Partizan Našice; in 1976 he moved to Partizan Bjelovar, winning the Yugoslav national championship in 1977 and 1979. The same year, he won gold at the Mediterranean Games with the Yugoslav national team. In 1980 he finished sixth in the Olympic tournament: he played all six matches and was fifth best scorer with 33 goals. At the 1982 World Championship, Jurina and the Yugoslavs went to the final but was defeated by USSR. At the 1983 Mediterranean Games, he won its second gold medal in the competition. In 1984 he was part of the Yugoslav team which won the gold medal in the Los Angeles Olympics. He played all six matches and scored five goals.

In 1984 he then moved to Italy, where he played at SC Gaeta. In 1986/1987 Jurian played his ultimate season for German team TuS Schutterwald. Later he coached several Italian teams, including SC Gaeta, PM Città Sant'Angelo, Handball Sassari and PM Alcamo.

He died in 2011 from a cardiac arrest. 10 years after his death a stamp has been issued by Croatian Post Office.
