= Burevestnik (sports society) =

The emblem of the VSS Burevestnik

Burevestnik (Russian: Буреве́стник; English: Stormy Petrel) was the All-Union VSS of students and teachers of the most part of high schools and universities in the USSR, established in 1957 (between 1936 and 1957 the society with the same name united workers of Trade Unions of the State trade and State institutions).

== Notable members (one per sport) ==
- Nikolai Andrianov (artistic gymnastics)
- Tatyana Kazankina (athletics)
- Sergei Kovalenko (basketball)
- Gennadi Shatkov (boxing)
- Nona Gaprindashvili (chess)
- Lyubov Kozyreva (cross-country skiing)
- Mark Midler (fencing)
- Aleksandr Anpilogov (handball)
- Lidia Skoblikova (speed skating)
- Alexander Medved (wrestling)
