= Rafael López (handballer) =

Spanish handball player (born 1953)

Rafael López de León (born August 14, 1953) is a former Spanish handball player who competed in the 1980 Summer Olympics and in the 1984 Summer Olympics.

In 1980 he was part of the Spanish team which finished fifth in the Olympic tournament. He played two matches. Four years later he finished eighth with the Spanish team in the 1984 Olympic tournament. He played five matches and scored three goals.
