= Velibor Nenadić =

Yugoslav handball player

- Velibor Nenadić in 1987

Personal information
- Nationality: Yugoslav
- Born: 11 April 1957 (age 69)

Sport
- Sport: Handball

Velibor Nenadić (born 11 April 1957) is a Yugoslav handball player. He competed in the men's tournament at the 1980 Summer Olympics.
