= Jürg Luchs =

Swiss cyclist

Personal information
- Born: 29 September 1956 (age 70)

Cycling career
- Sport: Cycling

Jürg Luchs (born 29 September 1956) is a Swiss former cyclist. He competed in the individual road race and team time trial events at the 1980 Summer Olympics.
