= Lotti Tschanz =

Swiss archer (born 1933)

Charlotte "Lotti" Tschanz (born 10 July 1933) is a Swiss former archer who represented Switzerland in archery.

== Career ==
Tschanz competed in the 1980 Summer Olympic Games in the women's individual event and finished eighth with a score of 2346 points.
