= Peter Mahne =

Slovenian handball player

Personal information
- Nationality: Slovenian
- Born: 2 March 1959 (age 66); Ljubljana, Yugoslavia

Sport
- Sport: Handball

Peter Mahne (born 2 March 1959) is a Slovenian handball player. He competed in the men's tournament at the 1980 Summer Olympics.
