= Andrzej Kącki =

Polish handball player (born 1953)

Personal information
- Full name: Andrzej Marian Kącki
- Nationality: Polish
- Born: 29 November 1953 Tarnów, Poland
- Height: 1.87 m (6 ft 2 in)

Sport
- Sport: Handball
- Position: Goalkeeper

Senior clubs
- Years: Team
- 1971–1980: SPR Stal Mielec
National team
Years	Team	Apps	(Gls)
1977–1980	Poland	60	(0)

Andrzej Marian Kącki (born 29 November 1953) is a former Polish handball player who competed in the 1980 Summer Olympics.
