= Abdel Krim Hamiche =

Algerian handball player (born 1958)

Personal information
- Nationality: Algerian
- Born: 29 September 1958 (age 68)

Sport
- Sport: Handball
- Current club: Retired

Youth career
- Years: Team
- –: IRB Oran

Senior clubs
- Years: Team
- 1978–1985: (Algeria) MP Alger
- 1985–1986: (Algeria) Nadit Alger
- 1986–1988: (France) AC Boulogne-Billancourt
- 1988–1989: (Qatar) Al-Sadd SC
- 1989–1991: (France) Vitrolles SMUC
National team
- Years: Team
- –: Algeria

Abdel Krim Hamiche (born 29 September 1958) is an Algerian handball player. He competed in the men's tournament at the 1980 Summer Olympics.
