= Vicente Calabuig =

Spanish handball player (born 1958)

Vicente Calabuig Saus (born 3 March 1953) is a former Spanish handball player who competed in the 1980 Summer Olympics. In 1980 he finished fifth with the Spanish team in the Olympic tournament. He played all six matches and scored three goals.
