= Marek Panas =

Polish handball player (born 1951)

Marek Andrzej Panas (born 7 November 1951 in Elbląg) is a Polish former handball player who competed in the 1980 Summer Olympics.

In 1980 he was part of the Polish team which finished seventh in the Summer Olympics. He played five matches and scored twelve goals.
