= Jesús María Albisu =

Spanish handball player (born 1949)

Jesús María Albisu Andrade (born 6 April 1949 in Errenteria) is a former Spanish handball player who competed in the 1980 Summer Olympics.

In 1980 he finished fifth with the Spanish team in the Olympic tournament. He played all six matches and scored 27 goals.
