= Sokolniki Arena =

Former sports venue in Moscow, Russia

Coordinates: 55°47′34″N 37°40′17″E

- Sokolniki Sports Palace
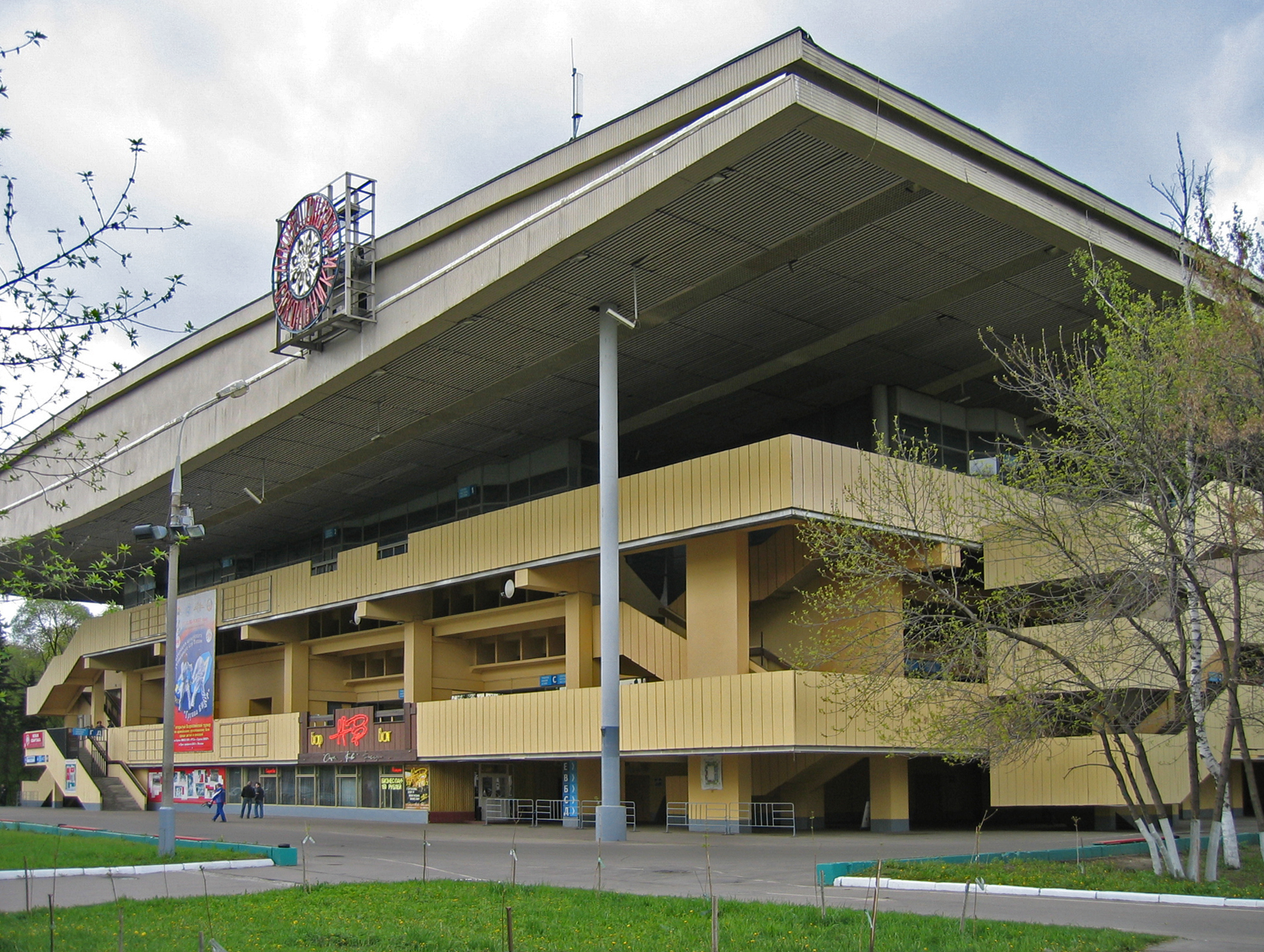
- Interactive map of Sokolniki Arena
- Location: Moscow, Russia
- Capacity: 5,000

Construction
- Opened: 1956
- Renovated: 1973

Website
- www.sokolniki.info

Sokolniki Arena or Sokolniki Sports Palace is a former indoor sporting arena located in Moscow, Russia. It is located in the Sokolniki District of the city. Initially it was an outdoor skating rink, roofed in 1973 during the preparations for the 1973 Summer Universiade. The capacity of the arena is 5,000.

The Sokolniki Sports Palace was a venue of handball tournament for the 1980 Summer Olympics. It is the home arena of the HK Lokomotiv Moscow ice hockey team.

The Sokolniki Arena was demolished in December 2021.

== Tragedy ==
On March 10, 1975, at a friendly match between Soviet and Canadian youth hockey teams at the Sokolniki Arena, at least 20 people were killed in a stampede after the lights went out.
