= Jasem Sadeghi =

Iranian footballer

Personal information
- Full name: Jasem Sadeghi
- Date of birth: March 30, 1986 (age 40)
- Place of birth: Dehcheshmeh, Iran
- Position: Midfielder

Team information
- Current team: Esteghlal Ahvaz
- Number: 6

Youth career
- –2006: Foolad

Senior career*
Years	Team	Apps	(Gls)
2006–2007	Foolad	3	(0)
2007–2008	Shahin Ahvaz	?	(1)
2008 –	Esteghlal Ahvaz	42	(2)
- * Club domestic league appearances and goals as of 3 June 2010

Jasem Sadeghi (born March 30, 1986) is an Iranian football player, who currently plays for Esteghlal Ahvaz of the IPL

== Club career ==
Sadeghi joined Esteghlal Ahvaz in 2008 after spending the previous season at Shahin Ahvaz F.C.

=== Club career statistics ===
Last Update 3 June 2010

Club performance			League		Cup		Continental		Total	
Season	Club	League	Apps	Goals	Apps	Goals	Apps	Goals	Apps	Goals
Iran			League		Hazfi Cup		Asia		Total	
2006–07	Foolad	Persian Gulf Cup	3	0			-	-		
2007–08	Shahin Ahvaz	Azadegan League		1			-	-		
2008–09	Esteghlal Ahvaz	Persian Gulf Cup	20	0			-	-		
2009–10	Esteghlal Ahvaz	Persian Gulf Cup	22	2		0	-	-		2
Total	Iran			3			0	0		
Career total				3			0	0		

- Assist Goals

Season	Team	Assists
09–10	Esteghlal Ahvaz	0
