= Juan Prendes =

Cuban handball player (born 1955)

Personal information
- Nationality: Cuban
- Born: 8 March 1955 (age 70)

Sport
- Sport: Handball

Juan Prendes (born 8 March 1955) is a Cuban handball player. He competed in the men's tournament at the 1980 Summer Olympics.
