= Juan José Uría =

Spanish handball player (born 1956)

Juan José Uría Bazterrica (born July 25, 1956 in Gipuzkoa) is a Spanish former handball player who competed in the 1980 Summer Olympics, the 1984 Summer Olympics, and the 1988 Summer Olympics.

== Career ==
In 1980 he was part of the Spanish team, which finished fifth in the Olympic tournament. He played all six matches and scored 24 goals.

Four years later he finished eighth with the Spanish team in the 1984 Olympic tournament. He played all six matches and scored ten goals.

In 1988 he was a member of the Spanish team, which finished ninth in the Olympic tournament. He played all six matches and scored six goals.
