= Juan de la Puente =

Spanish handball player (born 1956)

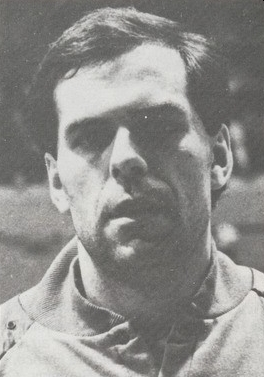
- Juan de la Puente (1986)

Personal information
- Full name: Juan Alfonso de la Puente Bordonaba
- Nationality: Spanish
- Born: 14 January 1956 (age 70) Gijon, Spain
- Height: 183 cm (72 in)

Sport
- Sport: Handball

Youth career
- Years: Team
- –: Institut Jovellanos
- –1971: Colegio de la Immaculada
- 1971–1973: RGC Covadonga

Senior clubs
- Years: Team
- 1973–1985: Atlético Madrid BM
- 1985–1990: FC Barcelona Handbol
- 1990–?: SCDR Anaitasuna
National team
Years	Team	Apps	(Gls)
1976-1988	Spain	185	(228)

Juan Alfonso de la Puente Bordonaba (born 14 January 1956 in Gijón) is a former Spanish handball player who competed at the 1980, the 1984 and the 1988 Summer Olympics for his native country.

In 1980 he was part of the Spanish team which finished fifth in the Olympic Tournament. He played all six matches and scored ten goals.

Four years later he finished eighth with the Spanish team in the 1984 Olympic tournament. He played four matches and scored five goals.

In 1988 he was a member of the Spanish team which finished ninth in the Olympic tournament. He played five matches and scored seven goals.
