= Mouloud Mekhnache =

Algerian handball player

Personal information
- Nationality: Algerian
- Born: 1955 (age 70–71) Skikda, Algeria
- Height: 180 cm (71 in)

Sport
- Sport: Handball
- Position: Right wing / Right back

Youth career
- Years: Team
- 1968-1971: JSM Skikda

Senior clubs
- Years: Team
- 1971-1973: JSM Skikda
- 1973-1983: Nadit Alger
- 1983-1993: JSM Skikda
National team
- Years: Team
- –: Algeria

Teams managed
- 1993-1999: JSM Skikda

Mouloud Mekhnache (born 1955) is an Algerian handball player and coach. He competed at the 1980 Summer Olympics and the 1984 Summer Olympics.
