= Juan Querol =

Cuban handball player (born 1958)

Personal information
- Full name: Juan Francisco Querol Morales
- Nationality: Cuban
- Born: 21 August 1958 (age 68)
- Height: 186 cm (73 in)

Sport
- Sport: Handball
Medal record
Men's handball
Representing Cuba
Pan American Games
Silver medal – second place	1987 Indianapolis	Team

Juan Francisco Querol Morales (Note: In this Spanish name, the first or paternal surname is Querol and the second or maternal family name is Morales.) (born 21 August 1958), nicknamed El Mago, is a Cuban handball player. He competed in the men's tournament at the 1980 Summer Olympics.
