= Jesús Agramonte =

Cuban handball player (born 1959)

Personal information
- Full name: Jesús Marcelino Agramonte Terry
- Nationality: Cuba
- Born: 26 April 1959 (age 67) Cruces, Cienfuegos, Cuba
- Height: 1.91 m (6 ft 3 in)

Sport
- Sport: Handball
Medal record
Men's handball
Representing Cuba
Pan American Games
Silver medal – second place	1987 Indianapolis	Team

Jesús Marcelino Agramonte Terry (Note: In this Spanish name, the first or paternal surname is Agramonte and the second or maternal family name is Terry.) (born 26 April 1959) is a Cuban handball player. He competed in the 1980 Summer Olympics.
