= Ahcen Djeffal =

Algerian handball player (born 1952)

Personal information
- Nationality: Algerian
- Born: 12 December 1952 (age 73)

Sport
- Sport: Handball

Ahcen Djeffal (born 12 December 1952) is an Algerian handball player. He competed at the 1980 Summer Olympics and the 1988 Summer Olympics.
