= Poul Kjær Poulsen =

Danish handball player (born 1952)

Personal information
- Full name: Poul Anders Kjær Poulsen
- Nationality: Danish
- Born: 16 May 1952 (age 74) Bredstrup, Denmark
- Height: 181 cm (71 in)

Sport
- Sport: Handball
- Current club: Retired

Senior clubs
- Years: Team
- 1973-1974: Fredericia HK
- 1979-1982: IK Skovbakken
National team
Years	Team	Apps	(Gls)
–	Denmark	60	(106)

Poul Anders Kjær Poulsen (born May 16, 1952) is a Danish former handball player who competed in the 1980 Summer Olympics.

He was born in Bredstrup, Syddanmark.

In 1980 he finished ninth with the Danish team in the Olympic tournament. He played all six matches and scored 18 goals.
