= Azzedine Bouzerar =

Algerian handball player (born 1953)

Personal information
- Nationality: Algerian
- Born: 7 July 1953 (age 71)

Sport
- Sport: Handball

Azzedine Bouzerar (born 7 July 1953) is an Algerian handball player. He competed in the men's tournament at the 1980 Summer Olympics.
