= Roberto Casuso =

Cuban handball player (1954-2011)

Personal information
- Born: 24 October 1954; Havana, Cuba
- Died: 29 November 2011 (aged 57); Havana, Cuba

Sport
- Sport: Handball

Roberto Casuso (24 October 1954 – 29 November 2011) was a Cuban handball player. He competed in the men's tournament at the 1980 Summer Olympics.
