= Eduard Wickli =

Swiss handball player

Personal information
- Nationality: Swiss
- Born: 23 January 1949 (age 76)

Sport
- Sport: Handball

Eduard Wickli (born 23 January 1949) is a Swiss handball player. He competed in the men's tournament at the 1980 Summer Olympics.
