= Ahmad Al-Emran =

Kuwaiti handball player

Ahmad al-Emran
Personal information
- Nationality: Kuwait
- Height: 1.60 m (5 ft 3 in)
- Weight: 87 kg (192 lb)

Sport
- Sport: Handball

Ahmad al-Emran is a Kuwaiti handball player. He competed in the 1980 Summer Olympics.
