= Jerzy Klempel =

Polish handball player (1953–2004)

Personal information
- Nationality: Polish
- Born: 23 April 1953 Międzylesie, Poland
- Died: 28 May 2004 (aged 51) Wrocław, Poland
- Height: 1.92 m (6 ft 4 in)

Sport
- Sport: Handball
- Position: Right back, Right wing

Senior clubs
- Years: Team
- 1970–1971: Gwardia Opole
- 1971–1982: Śląsk Wrocław
- 1982–1991: Frisch Auf Göppingen
National team
Years	Team	Apps	(Gls)
1972–1987	Poland	224	(1170)

Olympic medal record

Men's Handball
Bronze medal – third place	1976 Montreal	Team

Jerzy Klempel (23 April 1953 – 28 May 2004) was a Polish former handball player and coach who competed in the 1976 Summer Olympics and in the 1980 Summer Olympics.

In 1976 he won the bronze medal with the Polish team. He played all five matches and scored 23 goals.

Four years later he was part of the Polish team which finished seventh. He played all six matches and scored 44 goals. He became the top scorer of the tournament.

He holds the record for being the fastest player to reach 1,000 goals in the handball-Bundesliga, using only 123 games to do so.

== See also ==
- List of men's handballers with 1000 or more international goals
