= Peter Jehle (handballer) =

Swiss handball player

Personal information
- Nationality: Swiss
- Born: 14 May 1957 (age 67)

Sport
- Sport: Handball

Peter Jehle (born 14 May 1957) is a Swiss handball player. He competed at the 1980 Summer Olympics and the 1984 Summer Olympics.
