= Faraj Al-Mutairi =

Kuwaiti handball player

Personal information
- Nationality: Kuwait
- Height: 1.72 m (5 ft 8 in)
- Weight: 77 kg (170 lb)

Sport
- Sport: Handball

Faraj Al-Mutairi is a Kuwaiti handball player. He competed in the 1980 Summer Olympics.
