= Mohamed Al-Qassar =

Kuwaiti handball player

Personal information
- Nationality: Kuwait
- Height: 1.75 m (5 ft 9 in)
- Weight: 74 kg (163 lb)

Sport
- Sport: Handball

Mohamed Al-Qassar is a Kuwaiti handball player. He competed in the 1980 Summer Olympics.
