= Robert Jehle =

Swiss handball player

Personal information
- Nationality: Swiss
- Born: 13 July 1952
- Died: 20 April 1988 (aged 35)

Sport
- Sport: Handball

Robert Jehle (13 July 1952 – 20 April 1988) was a Swiss handball player. He competed in the men's tournament at the 1980 Summer Olympics.
