= Ernst Züllig =

Swiss handball player

Personal information
- Nationality: Swiss
- Born: 10 October 1948 (age 76)

Sport
- Sport: Handball

Ernst Züllig (born 10 October 1948) is a Swiss handball player. He competed in the men's tournament at the 1980 Summer Olympics.
