= Saleh Najem =

Kuwaiti handball player

Personal information
- Nationality: Kuwaiti
- Died: 12 October 2021

Sport
- Sport: Handball

Saleh Najem (died 12 October 2021) was a Kuwaiti handball player. He competed in the men's tournament at the 1980 Summer Olympics.
