= Hans Huber (handballer) =

Swiss handball player

Personal information
- Nationality: Swiss
- Born: 8 February 1951 (age 74)

Sport
- Sport: Handball

Hans Huber (born 8 February 1951) is a Swiss handball player. He competed in the men's tournament at the 1980 Summer Olympics.
