= Majid Al-Khamis =

Kuwaiti handball player

Personal information
- Nationality: Kuwait
- Height: 1.70 m (5 ft 7 in)
- Weight: 75 kg (165 lb)

Sport
- Sport: Handball

Majid Al-Khamis is a Kuwaiti handball player. He competed in the 1980 Summer Olympics.
