= Abdullah Al-Qena'i =

Kuwaiti handball player

Personal information
- Nationality: Kuwait
- Height: 1.70 m (5 ft 7 in)
- Weight: 87 kg (192 lb)

Sport
- Sport: Handball

Abdullah Al-Qena'i is a Kuwaiti handball player. He competed in the 1980 Summer Olympics.
