= Ugo Jametti =

Swiss handball player

Personal information
- Nationality: Swiss
- Born: 24 August 1959 (age 65)

Sport
- Sport: Handball

Ugo Jametti (born 24 August 1959) is a Swiss handball player. He competed in the men's tournament at the 1980 Summer Olympics.
