= Khamis Bashir =

Kuwaiti handball player

Personal information
- Nationality: Kuwaiti

Sport
- Sport: Handball

Khamis Bashir is a Kuwaiti handball player. He competed in the men's tournament at the 1980 Summer Olympics.
