= Vasile Stîngă =

Romanian handball player (born 1957)

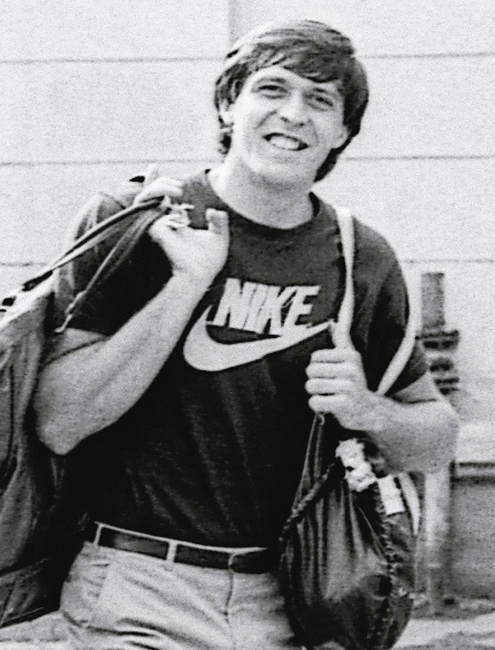

Personal information
- Born: 21 January 1957 (age 69) Hunedoara, Romania
- Height: 188 cm (74 in)

Sport
- Sport: Handball
- Position: Left back, Centre back

Youth career
- Years: Team
- –: (Romania) Clubul Sportiv Școlar Constructorul

Senior clubs
- Years: Team
- –1977: (Romania) Metalul Hunedoara
- 1977–1989: (Romania) Steaua Bucharest
- 1989–1992: (Spain) Alzira Avidesa
National team
| Years | Team | Apps | (Gls) |
| – | Romania (Youth) | 16 | (113) |
| – | Romania (Junior) | 14 | (22) |
| – | Romania (B) | 2 | (6) |
| 1974–? | Romania (A) | 269 | (1414) |
| – | Total: | 301 | (1555) |

Teams managed
- 2004–2006: (Romania) Steaua Bucharest
- 2008–2008: (Romania) HCM Constanța
- 2008–?: (Romania) Energia Târgu Jiu
Medal record
Representing Romania
Olympic Games
| Bronze medal – third place | 1980 Moscow | Team |
| Bronze medal – third place | 1984 Los Angeles | Team |
World University Games
| Gold medal – first place | 1981 France | Team |
| Gold medal – first place | 1985 West Germany | Team |

Vasile Stîngă (also Stanga, born 21 January 1957) is a Romanian handball coach and former player. He played 269 matches for Romania men's national handball team, scoring 1414 goals and winning bronze medals at the 1980 and 1984 Olympics. He was the top scorer at the 1982 World Championship and in 1985 was selected for the World Handball Team.

At the club level Stângă played for Steaua Bucharest (1977–1989), winning with them 11 national titles and also reach an EHF Champions League final in 1989, and for Alzira Avidesa (1989–1992) in Spain, and was instrumental in the 1992 Copa del Rey win against Barcelona. He led Steaua to victory in the 2006 EHF Challenge Cup as a coach.

Stîngă is married to the former basketball player Ecaterina Stîngă, they have a son Andrei and a daughter Corina.

== See also ==
- List of men's handballers with 1000 or more international goals
