= Peter Maag (handballer) =

Swiss handball player

Personal information
- Nationality: Swiss
- Born: 8 January 1953 (age 72)

Sport
- Sport: Handball

Peter Maag (born 8 January 1953) is a Swiss handball player. He competed in the men's tournament at the 1980 Summer Olympics.
