= Konrad Affolter =

Swiss handball player

Personal information
- Nationality: Switzerland
- Born: 17 May 1954 (age 70)
- Height: 1.87 m (6 ft 2 in)
- Weight: 87 kg (192 lb)

Sport
- Sport: Handball

Konrad Affolter (born 17 May 1954) is a Swiss handball player. He competed in the 1980 Summer Olympics.
