= Hanspeter Lutz =

Swiss handball player

Personal information
- Nationality: Swiss
- Born: 26 September 1954 (age 70)

Sport
- Sport: Handball

Hanspeter Lutz (born 26 September 1954) is a Swiss handball player. He competed in the men's tournament at the 1980 Summer Olympics.
