= Walter Müller (handballer) =

Swiss handball player

Personal information
- Nationality: Swiss
- Born: 10 February 1957 (age 68)

Sport
- Sport: Handball

Walter Müller (born 10 February 1957) is a Swiss handball player. He competed in the men's tournament at the 1980 Summer Olympics.
