= Roland Brand =

Swiss handball player

Personal information
- Nationality: Swiss
- Born: 6 November 1953 (age 71)

Sport
- Sport: Handball

Roland Brand (born 6 November 1953) is a Swiss handball player. He competed in the men's tournament at the 1980 Summer Olympics.
