= Jasem Al-Qassar =

Kuwaiti handball player

Personal information
- Nationality: Kuwait
- Height: 1.68 m (5 ft 6 in)
- Weight: 78 kg (172 lb)

Sport
- Sport: Handball

Jasem Al-Qassar is a Kuwaiti handball player. He competed in the 1980 Summer Olympics.
