= Jasem Al-Deyab =

Kuwaiti handball player

Jasem al-Deyab
Personal information
- Full name: Jasem Muhammad al-Deyab
- Nationality: Kuwait
- Height: 1.60 m (5 ft 3 in)
- Weight: 86 kg (190 lb)

Sport
- Sport: Handball

Jasem al-Deyab is a Kuwaiti handball player. He competed in the 1980 Summer Olympics.
