= 1978 World Men's Handball Championship =

Tournament details
- Host country: Denmark
- Dates: 26 January-5 February
- Teams: 16

Final positions
- Champions: West Germany
- Runners-up: Soviet Union
- Third place: East Germany
- Fourth place: Denmark

Tournament statistics
- Matches played: 42
- Goals scored: 1,647 (39.21 per match)
- Top scorers: Péter Kovács (HUN); Jerzy Klempel (POL) (47 goals each)

The 1978 World Men's Handball Championship was the ninth team handball World Championship. It was held in Denmark between 26 January-5 February 1978. West Germany won the championship.

== Teams ==
Group A	Group B	Group C	Group D
Canada	East Germany	Denmark	Bulgaria
Czechoslovakia	France	Iceland	Japan
West Germany	Hungary	Soviet Union	Poland
Yugoslavia	Romania	Spain	Sweden

== Preliminary round ==
=== Group A ===
Date	Venue	Game	Res.	Half
26.Jan	Odense	Yugoslavia - Canada	24-11	(13-4)
26.Jan	Odense	West Germany - Czechoslovakia	16-13	(8-5)
28.Jan	Vejle	Yugoslavia - Czechoslovakia	17-16	(9-7)
28.Jan	Ringe	West Germany - Canada	20-10	(7-3)
29.Jan	Odense	West Germany - Yugoslavia	18-13	(9-5)
29.Jan	Fredericia	Czechoslovakia - Canada	29-10	(15-5)

Team	Pld	W	D	L	GF	GA	GD	Pts
West Germany	3	3	0	0	54	36	+18	6
Yugoslavia	3	2	0	1	54	45	+9	4
Czechoslovakia	3	1	0	2	58	43	+15	2
Canada	3	0	0	3	31	73	−42	0

=== Group B ===
Date	Venue	Game	Res.	Half
26.Jan	Herning	Hungary - France	33-22	(17-9)
26.Jan	Herning	East Germany - Romania	18-16	(8-7)
28.Jan	Esbjerg	Hungary - East Germany	12-10	(7-6)
28.Jan	Aabenraa	Romania - France	36-17	(18-9)
29.Jan	Herning	Romania - Hungary	22-21	(9-10)
29.Jan	Ribe	East Germany - France	28-15	(14-6)

Team	Pld	W	D	L	GF	GA	GD	Pts
Romania	3	2	0	1	74	56	+18	4
East Germany	3	2	0	1	56	43	+13	4
Hungary	3	2	0	1	66	54	+12	4
France	3	0	0	3	54	97	−43	0

=== Group C ===
Date	Venue	Game	Res.	Half
26.Jan	Århus	Denmark - Spain	19-15	(11-9)
26.Jan	Århus	Soviet Union - Iceland	22-18	(14-9)
28.Jan	Aalborg	Soviet Union - Spain	24-12	(10-5)
28.Jan	Randers	Denmark - Iceland	21-14	(10-8)
29.Jan	Århus	Soviet Union - Denmark	16-16	(9-8)
29.Jan	Thisted	Spain - Iceland	25-22	(15-10)

Team	Pld	W	D	L	GF	GA	GD	Pts
Soviet Union	3	2	1	0	62	46	+16	5
Denmark	3	2	1	0	56	45	+11	5
Spain	3	1	0	2	52	65	−13	2
Iceland	3	0	0	3	54	68	−14	0

=== Group D ===
Date	Venue	Game	Res.	Half
26.Jan	Brøndby	Poland - Japan	26-21	(13-13)
26.Jan	Brøndby	Sweden - Bulgaria	31-16	(14-10)
28.Jan	Køge	Sweden - Japan	24-20	(10-10)
28.Jan	Kalundborg	Poland - Bulgaria	28-22	(20-7)
29.Jan	Helsingør	Poland - Sweden	22-17	(14-9)
29.Jan	Næstved	Japan - Bulgaria	23-20	(11-11)

Team	Pld	W	D	L	GF	GA	GD	Pts
Poland	3	3	0	0	76	60	+16	6
Sweden	3	2	0	1	72	58	+14	4
Japan	3	1	0	2	64	70	−6	2
Bulgaria	3	0	0	3	58	82	−24	0

== Second round ==
=== Group 1 ===
Date	Venue	Game	Res.	Half
31.Jan	Odense	Yugoslavia - Romania	17-16	(9-10)
31.Jan	Brøndby	East Germany - West Germany	14-14	(9-7)
2.Feb	Kalundborg	Yugoslavia - East Germany	16-16	(11-9)
2.Feb	Helsingør	Romania - West Germany	17-17	(6-8)

Team	Pld	W	D	L	GF	GA	GD	Pts
West Germany	3	1	2	0	49	44	+5	4
East Germany	3	1	2	0	48	46	+2	4
Yugoslavia	3	1	1	1	46	50	−4	3
Romania	3	0	1	2	49	52	−3	1

=== Group 2 ===
Date	Venue	Game	Res.	Half
31.Jan	Vejle	Soviet Union - Sweden	24-18	(10-5)
31.Jan	Randers	Denmark - Poland	25-23	(14-12)
2.Feb	Århus	Soviet Union - Poland	18-16	(7-9)
2.Feb	Herning	Denmark - Sweden	18-14	(10-9)

Team	Pld	W	D	L	GF	GA	GD	Pts
Soviet Union	3	2	1	0	58	50	+8	5
Denmark	3	2	1	0	59	53	+6	5
Poland	3	1	0	2	61	60	+1	2
Sweden	3	0	0	3	49	64	−15	0

=== Placement matches -- 9th to 12th ===
Date	Venue	Game	Res.	Half
31.Jan	Rønnede	Spain - Japan	26-15	(14-10)
31.Jan	Frederikssund	Czechoslovakia - Hungary	18-18	(11-12)
2 Feb	Roskilde	Spain - Czechoslovakia	24-21	(12-12)
2 Feb	Nykøbing Falster	Hungary - Japan	28-26	(15-16)
4 Feb	Taastrup	Hungary - Spain	23-19	(11-8)
4 Feb	Aakirkeby	Japan - Czechoslovakia	25-25	(14-12)

Team	Pld	W	D	L	GF	GA	GD	Pts
Hungary	3	2	1	0	71	63	+8	5
Spain	3	2	0	1	69	59	+10	4
Czechoslovakia	3	0	2	1	64	67	−3	2
Japan	3	0	1	2	66	81	−15	1

== 7th / 8th place ==
Date	Match^{1}			Score	Half
05.02.1978	Romania	-	Sweden	25-17	(13-7)

- (^{1}) - In Copenhagen

== 5th / 6th place ==
Date	Match^{1}			Score	Half
05.02.1978	Yugoslavia	-	Poland	21-19	(8-10)

- (^{1}) - In Copenhagen

== 3rd / 4th place ==
Date	Match^{1}			Score	Half
05.02.1978	East Germany	-	Denmark	19-15	(9-7)

- (^{1}) - In Copenhagen

== Final ==
Date	Match^{1}			Score	Half
05.02.1978	West Germany	-	Soviet Union	20-19	(11-11)

- (^{1}) - In Copenhagen

== Final standings ==
Rank	Team
Gold medal	West Germany
Silver medal	Soviet Union
Bronze medal	East Germany
4	Denmark
5	Yugoslavia
6	Poland
7	Romania
8	Sweden
9	Hungary
10	Spain
11	Czechoslovakia
12	Japan
13	Iceland
14	Bulgaria
15	Canada
16	France

Source: IHF
