= Péter Kovács (handballer) =

Hungarian handball player (born 1955)

Personal information
- Nationality: Hungarian
- Born: 8 April 1955 (age 71) Budapest, Hungary
- Height: 2.04 m (6 ft 8 in)

Sport
- Sport: Handball
- Position: Left Back
- Current club: —

Senior clubs
- Years: Team
- 1970–1984: Budapest Honvéd SE
- 1984–1988: OSC Dortmund
- 1988–1990: TV Grosswallstadt
- 1990–1991: TUSEM Essen
National team
Years	Team	Apps	(Gls)
1973–1995	Hungary	323	(1797)

Teams managed
- –: VfL Hameln
- –: SC Bad Salzuflen
- –: Klagenfurt
- –1998: Százhalombattai KE
- 1998–2003: Hungary Women Junior
- 2003–2006: SC Pick Szeged
- 2006–2007: Dunaferr SE
- 2007: Óbudai Goldberger SE
- 2007–2010: Turkey Women
- 2010–2011: CS Oltchim Rm. Vâlcea
- 2011–2012: Békéscsabai Előre NKSE
- 2016: Kisvárdai KC
- 2017–2018: Vasas SC
- 2018–: Szent István SE (Junior Team)
Medal record
World Championship
Silver medal – second place	1986 Switzerland	Team

Péter Kovács (born April 8, 1955 in Budapest) is a former Hungarian international handball player and handball coach.

One of the best players of his time, Kovács played 323 times for Hungary and scored 1797 goals, having captured a World Championship silver medal in 1986.

On club level, beside the number of domestic successes, his biggest achievement is the European Champions Cup title, he has taken with Budapest Honvéd in 1982. Kovács has shown his class abroad as well, having won both the German championship and cup title. He was also awarded the Sportsman of the Year prize while in Dortmund, just ahead of the football professionals of the local club Borussia. Thanks to his outstanding performances he was given the nickname "Peter the Great".

== Playing career ==
=== Club ===
==== Budapest Honvéd ====
Kovács started to play handball for his hometown team Budapest Honvéd SE and spent the majority of his playing career by the club. For the late seventies he established himself as one of the key players in the team, and during the period he spent at the club he has won the Hungarian championship six times and has taken the Hungarian cup title once. He has also lifted the European Champions Cup trophy in 1982, after two unsuccessful campaigns in 1978 and 1979, when Honvéd have lost out in the semifinals.

Kovács was known for his prolific goalscoring skills, having won the Hungarian championship top scorers' award four times (1977, 1981, 1982, 1983). In addition, he has also been voted the Hungarian Handballer of the Year in those seasons.

==== German years ====
He moved to 2. Bundesliga team OSC Dortmund in 1984 and won promotion to the top division right in his first season with the club. He spent another three years with the North-Rhine Westphalian team before moving to TV Großwallstadt. With the Aschaffenburg-based club he has taken the German cup in 1989 and the German championship a year later. In 1990, at the age of 35, Kovács has decided to a final change, and switched to league rivals TUSEM Essen for his last professional season. He ended his career in style by finishing fourth in the Bundesliga and celebrating the German cup triumph over TV Niederwürzbach in the finals.

=== International ===
Kovács has played on five World Championships for the Hungarian national team, debuting on the 1974 edition. Four years later, despite Hungary finished only seventh, Kovács already found himself in the spotlight as he was named the top scorer of the tournament with 47 goals. In 1982 Kovács was in inspired form once again, finishing second on the top scorers' list with 56 goals. He has peaked and enjoyed his best international result on the 1986 World Championships, where Hungary finished second after losing 22–24 to Yugoslavia in the final. Kovács scored 45 goals on the tournament, and with that he became the fourth best scorer of the World Championship. He was also selected to the All-Star team.

Although retired from professional handball earlier, Kovács made a comeback for the 1995 World Championships at the age of 40, however, finished in the disappointing seventeenth position with Hungary, suffering four losses and achieving a single victory against the United States.

Kovács have been also selected for three Olympic Games, first in 1976. That year the Hungarian team finished sixth on the Olympic tournament. He played all five matches and scored fifteen goals. Four years later he finished fourth with Hungary, scoring 25 goals in six matches.

Hopes were high before the 1984 Olympic Games, since Hungary had a bright generation on the top, but by joining the Soviet Union-led boycott the team did not participate on the tournament. Instead of that, the Hungarian national team took part on the Friendship Games, where they finished fourth after losing the bronze medal match to Poland by a single goal. Kovács has topped the scoring chart with 26 goals.

He was member of the team which finished fourth again on the 1988 Olympic tournament. Kovács played all six matches and scored 23 goals.

He was picked for the World Selection four times between 1978 and 1985.

== Coaching career ==
Kovács started his coaching career in lower reputation German clubs before moving home to Hungary to overtake Százhalombattai KE. He first tasted the success as coach while in charge at the Hungarian women's junior national team: he has managed the team to silver medals on the Junior World Championship in 2001 and 2003, and guided them to another silver on the Junior European Championship in 2002.

The silver-era continued on his next managerial station, as he finished second in the Hungarian championship with SC Pick Szeged three times in a row between 2004 and 2006. However, at the end of the 2006 season, his team managed to break the long-held league domination of domestic rivals MKB Veszprém, after Szeged overcame their Transdanubian opponent in the Hungarian cup final.

In the summer of 2006, he moved to coach Dunaferr NK in which he won the league and cup bronze with the Danube-side team. After one season, he moved on to sit on the bench of Óbudai Goldberger SE. His role included coaching the Turkish women's national team, supervised the training of younger age-groups, and educated future coaches of the sport.

Kovács was close to lead the Turkish team to their first ever major tournament in 2008, but after they beat Denmark 25–24 in the first rounds of the European Championship qualification playoff, their highly rated opponent have turned the things around in the second leg, and secured a one-goal aggregate victory over Turkey.

Two years later, Turkey was only one match away from the European Championship again, and have faced Serbia in a decisive match. They needed a two-goals victory to secure their ticket to continental tournament. On a tightly contested game, after a 15–15 half-time score, finally Serbia won by a single goal and thus knocked Turkey out from the competition.

Despite Kovács did not manage to qualify his team to a major international tournament, he was held in high esteem following his impressive work in Turkey, and in the summer of 2010 Oltchim Râmnicu Vâlcea have bought out from his contract. Oltchim have expected to repeat the results of the past season and reach the finals of the EHF Champions League, and although the team have qualified for the main round of the competition, the board went over Kovács' head and with a surprise decision they have removed the Hungarian coach from his position just three days prior the main round clash against ŽRK Budućnost Podgorica. He was the fourth trainer in four years who was eaten up by the Romanian team. Kovács was replaced by Anja Andersen, however, the Danish manager has also been fired just in a month due to the poor performances, and Oltchim eventually finished group last.

Few months later, Kovács was amongst the three candidates for the head coach position of the Hungarian women's national team, which was vacated in June 2011, following Hungary failed to qualify for the forthcoming World Championship and Eszter Mátéfi resigned. The Hungarian Handball Federation finally came to a decision that Karl Erik Bøhn is the right man to fulfil their plans, however, Kovács have not been without a job for too long, since he was signed by Békéscsabai Előre NKSE yet in October 2011. His contract ran until 30 June 2012.

== Administrative roles ==
Between 1995 and 2003 he served as technical director of the Hungarian Handball Federation, and from 1996 to 2005 he was member of the Commission of Coaching and Methods of the International Handball Federation. Kovács was also invited as one of the two main lecturers for the 2012 Top Coaches' Seminar of the European Handball Federation, which is set to take place in Serbia during the 2012 European Championship.

== Achievements ==
=== As player ===
- Nemzeti Bajnokság I:
  - Winner: 1976, 1977, 1980, 1981, 1982, 1983
- Magyar Kupa:
  - Winner: 1983
- Bundesliga:
  - Winner: 1990
- DHB-Pokal:
  - Winner: 1989, 1991
- World Championship:
  - Silver Medallist: 1986

=== As coach ===
- Nemzeti Bajnokság I – men:
  - Silver Medallist: 2004, 2005, 2006
- Magyar Kupa – men:
  - Winner: 2006
- Nemzeti Bajnokság I – women:
  - Bronze Medallist: 2007
- Magyar Kupa – women:
  - Silver Medalist: 2012
  - Bronze Medallist: 2007
- Junior World Championship – women's tournament:
  - Silver Medallist: 2001, 2003
- Junior European Championship – women's tournament:
  - Silver Medallist: 2002

== Individual awards ==
- Hungarian Handballer of the Year: 1977, 1980, 1981, 1982, 1983
- Nemzeti Bajnokság I Top Scorer: 1977, 1981, 1982, 1983
- World Championship Top Scorer: 1978
- Friendship Games Top Scorer: 1984
- All-Star Left Back of the World Championship: 1986

== Personal life ==
He is married and has two children, András and Márton.

== See also ==
- List of men's handballers with 1000 or more international goals
