= Soviet Union men's national handball team =

The USSR national handball team was the national handball team of the Soviet Union. It was considered one of the strongest national teams in the world, and has won both the World Men's Handball Championship and Olympic gold.

After the Dissolution of the Soviet Union the Russia men's national handball team became the successor to the Soviet Union team. The last major international tournament for the Soviet Union was the 1992 Olympics, where they competed as the Unified team. The last game under the Soviet flag was on 21 December 1991 against Germany.

== World Championships Record ==
Year	Hosting Country	Rank
1954	Sweden	Did not participate
1958	East Germany	Did not participate
1961	West Germany	Did not participate
1964	Czechoslovakia	5th Place
1967	Sweden	4th Place
1970	France	9th Place
1974	East Germany	5th Place
1978	Denmark	Runners-Up
1982	West Germany	Champions
1986	Switzerland	10th Place
1990	Czechoslovakia	Runners-Up

== Summer Olympics Record ==
Year	Hosting City	Rank
1972	(West Germany) Munich	5th Place
1976	(Canada) Montreal	Champions
1980	(Soviet Union) Moscow	Runners-Up
1984	(United States) Los Angeles	Did not participate
1988	(South Korea) Seoul	Champions
1992	(Spain) Barcelona	Unified Team Championship

=== Euro Tournaments ===
All teams in these tournaments are European,all World and Olympic Champions, and top 7 from World Championships and Olympics were participating. They were mini European championships at the time.

EURO World Cup tournament Sweden

- 1971 (Sweden) : 3rd place
- 1974 (Sweden) : 4th place
- 1979 (Sweden) : Champions
- 1984 (Sweden) : Champions
- 1992 (Sweden) : As CIS (Commonwealth of Independent States) 4th place

EURO Super Cup tournament Germany

- 1979 (Germany) : 3rd place
- 1981 (Germany) : Champions
- 1983 (Germany) : 2nd place
- 1985 (Germany) : Champions
- 1987 (Germany) : 2nd place
- 1989 (Germany) : Champions
- 1991 (Germany) : 2nd place

== National teams of the former Soviet republics ==
Armenia	National team	U-21 team	EHF
Azerbaijan	National team	U-21 team	EHF
Belarus	National team	U-21 team	EHF
Estonia	National team	U-21 team	EHF
Georgia	National team	U-21 team	EHF
Kazakhstan	National team	U-21 team	AHF
Kyrgyzstan	National team	U-20 team	AHF
Latvia	National team	U-21 team	EHF
Lithuania	National team	U-21 team	EHF
Moldova	National team	U-21 team	EHF
Russia	National team	U-21 team	EHF
Tajikistan	National team	U-20 team	AHF
Turkmenistan	National team	U-20 team	AHF
Ukraine	National team	U-21 team	EHF
Uzbekistan	National team	U-20 team	AHF

== See also ==
- Soviet Union women's national handball team
- Russia men's national handball team
- Russia women's national handball team
