= 1982 World Men's Handball Championship =

Tournament details
- Host country: West Germany
- Dates: 23 February to 7 March
- Teams: 16

Final positions
- Champions: Soviet Union
- Runners-up: Yugoslavia
- Third place: Poland
- Fourth place: Denmark

Tournament statistics
- Matches played: 54
- Goals scored: 2,344 (43.41 per match)
- Top scorer: Vasile Stîngă (RSR) (65 goals)

The 1982 World Men's Handball Championship was the 10th team handball World Championship. It was held in West Germany and West Berlin between 23 February-7 March 1982. Soviet Union won the championship.

== Teams ==
Group A	Group B	Group C	Group D
Czechoslovakia	Algeria	East Germany	Cuba
Kuwait	Hungary	Japan	Denmark
Soviet Union	Spain	Poland	Romania
West Germany	Sweden	Switzerland	Yugoslavia

== Preliminary round ==
Advanced to second round

=== Group A ===
Date	Venue	Game	Res.	Half
23.02.1982	Essen	Soviet Union - Czechoslovakia	31-17	(16-7)
23.02.1982	Essen	West Germany - Kuwait	24-10	(7-4)
24.02.1982	Duisburg	Soviet Union - Kuwait	44-19	(22-7)
24.02.1982	Dortmund	West Germany - Czechoslovakia	19-18	(7-7)
26.02.1982	Dortmund	Czechoslovakia - Kuwait	33-12	(17-4)
26.02.1982	Dortmund	Soviet Union - West Germany	24-16	(10-7)

Team	Pld	W	D	L	GF	GA	GD	Pts
Soviet Union	3	3	0	0	99	52	+47	6
West Germany	3	2	0	1	59	52	+7	4
Czechoslovakia	3	1	0	2	68	62	+6	2
Kuwait	3	0	0	3	41	101	−60	0

=== Group B ===
Date	Venue	Game	Res.	Half
23.02.1982	Homburg	Spain - Algeria	19-15	(11-6)
23.02.1982	Homburg	Hungary - Sweden	20-20	(10-5)
24.02.1982	Eppelheim	Hungary - Algeria	30-20	(15-10)
24.02.1982	West Berlin	Spain - Sweden	23-20	(14-7)
26.02.1982	Ludwigshafen	Sweden - Algeria	31-15	(11-5)
26.02.1982	Ludwigshafen	Spain - Hungary	20-20	(11-10)

Team	Pld	W	D	L	GF	GA	GD	Pts
Spain	3	2	1	0	62	55	+7	5
Hungary	3	1	2	0	70	60	+10	4
Sweden	3	1	1	1	71	58	+13	3
Algeria	3	0	0	3	50	80	−30	0

=== Group C ===
Date	Venue	Game	Res.	Half
23.02.1982	Hamburg	Poland - Switzerland	16-15	(7-7)
23.02.1982	Hamburg	East Germany - Japan	28-18	(15-11)
24.02.1982	Bremen	Poland - Japan	28-19	(16-9)
24.02.1982	Bremen	East Germany - Switzerland	16-14	(7-6)
26.02.1982	Kiel	Switzerland vs. Japan	18-15	(9-7)
26.02.1982	Kiel	East Germany vs. Poland	19-19	(10-9)

Team	Pld	W	D	L	GF	GA	GD	Pts
East Germany	3	2	1	0	63	51	+12	5
Poland	3	2	1	0	63	53	+10	5
Switzerland	3	1	0	2	47	47	0	2
Japan	3	0	0	3	52	74	−22	0

=== Group D ===
Date	Venue	Game	Res.	Half
23.02.1982	Göppingen	Yugoslavia - Cuba	38-21	(23-12)
23.02.1982	Göppingen	Romania - Denmark	20-18	(11-8)
24.02.1982	Eppelheim	Romania - Cuba	34-26	(20-8)
24.02.1982	West Berlin	Denmark - Yugoslavia	19-18	(8-11)
26.02.1982	Sindelfingen	Denmark - Cuba	28-21	(10-9)
26.02.1982	Sindelfingen	Yugoslavia - Romania	22-21	(12-12)

Team	Pld	W	D	L	GF	GA	GD	Pts
Yugoslavia	3	2	0	1	78	61	+17	4
Romania	3	2	0	1	0	66	−66	4
Denmark	3	2	0	1	65	59	+6	4
Cuba	3	0	0	3	68	100	−32	0

== Second round ==
Advanced to final
Advanced to bronze match

=== Group 1 ===
Date	Venue	Game	Res.	Half
28.02.1982	Hannover	Soviet Union - Switzerland	23-14	(10-7)
28.02.1982	Dortmund	West Germany - Poland	18-17	(9-9)
28.02.1982	Bremerhaven	Czechoslovakia - East Germany	24-21	(13-11)
02.03.1982	Dortmund	Soviet Union - Poland	27-21	(13-13)
02.03.1982	Dortmund	East Germany - West Germany	19-16	(9-8)
02.03.1982	Lübbecke	Switzerland - Czechoslovakia	17-17	(10-8)
04.03.1982	Dortmund	Soviet Union - East Germany	25-17	(14-9)
04.03.1982	Düsseldorf	Poland - Czechoslovakia	24-23	(15-9)
04.03.1982	Dortmund	West Germany - Switzerland	16-16	(8-9)

Team	Pld	W	D	L	GF	GA	GD	Pts
Soviet Union	5	5	0	0	130	85	+45	10
Poland	5	2	1	2	97	102	−5	5
East Germany	5	2	1	2	92	98	−6	5
West Germany	5	2	1	2	85	94	−9	5
Czechoslovakia	5	1	1	3	99	112	−13	3
Switzerland	5	0	2	3	76	88	−12	2

=== Group 2 ===
Date	Venue	Game	Res.	Half
28.02.1982	Munich	Denmark - Spain	23-22	(14-14)
28.02.1982	Munich	Romania - Sweden	31-24	(13-11)
28.02.1982	Offenburg	Hungary - Yugoslavia	20-20	(12-12)
02.03.1982	Böblingen	Yugoslavia - Spain	28-25	(11-12)
02.03.1982	Böblingen	Romania - Hungary	24-19	(12-11)
02.03.1982	Günzburg	Denmark - Sweden	21-20	(11-9)
04.03.1982	Frankfurt	Spain - Romania	22-20	(10-7)
04.03.1982	Frankfurt	Hungary - Denmark	19-19	(9-8)
04.03.1982	Elsenfeld	Yugoslavia - Sweden	30-19	(15-9)

Team	Pld	W	D	L	GF	GA	GD	Pts
Yugoslavia	5	3	1	1	118	104	+14	7
Denmark	5	3	1	1	100	99	+1	7
Romania	5	3	0	2	116	105	+11	6
Spain	5	2	1	2	112	111	+1	5
Hungary	5	0	4	1	98	103	−5	4
Sweden	5	0	1	4	103	125	−22	1

== 13th to 16th place ==
Date	Venue	Game	Res.	Half
28.02.1982	Gütersloh	Kuwait - Algeria	22-20	(8-9)
28.02.1982	Osnabrück	Cuba - Japan	25-20	(12-10)
02.03.1982	Haltern	Japan - Kuwait	31-20	(13-10)
02.03.1982	Brake	Algeria - Cuba	21-21	(12-13)
03.03.1982	Halle	Cuba - Kuwait	34-30	(16-12)
03.03.1982	Unna	Japan - Algeria	22-21	(11-12)

Team	Pld	W	D	L	GF	GA	GD	Pts
Cuba	3	2	1	0	80	71	+9	5
Japan	3	2	0	1	73	66	+7	4
Kuwait	3	1	0	2	72	85	−13	2
Algeria	3	0	1	2	62	65	−3	1

Updated to match(es) played on unknown. Source:

== 11th / 12th place ==
Date	Match^{1}			Score	Half
07.03.1982	Sweden	-	Switzerland	25–17	(10–5)

- (^{1}) - In Minden

== 9th / 10th place ==
Date	Match^{1}			Score	Half
06.03.1982	Hungary	-	Czechoslovakia	24–18	(16–7)

- (^{1}) - In Minden

== 7th / 8th place ==
Date	Match^{1}			Score	Half
07.03.1982	West Germany	-	Spain	19–15	(8–9)

- (^{1}) - In Dortmund

== 5th / 6th place ==
Date	Match^{1}			Score	Half
06.03.1982	Romania	-	East Germany	24–21	(12–10)

- (^{1}) - In Dortmund

== 3rd / 4th place ==
Date	Match^{1}			Score	Half
06.03.1982	Poland	-	Denmark	23–22	(12–13)

- (^{1}) - In Dortmund

== Final ==
Date	Match^{1}			Score	Half
07.03.1982	Soviet Union	-	Yugoslavia	30–27	(12–13) 23–23 (24–23 after extra time)

- (^{1}) - In Dortmund

== Final standings ==
Rank	Team
Gold medal	Soviet Union
Silver medal	Yugoslavia
Bronze medal	Poland
4	Denmark
5	Romania
6	East Germany
7	West Germany
8	Spain
9	Hungary
10	Czechoslovakia
11	Sweden
12	Switzerland
13	Cuba
14	Japan
15	Kuwait
16	Algeria

Winner and qualified for the 1984 Summer Olympics
Qualified for the 1984 Summer Olympics
Qualified for the 1984 Summer Olympics after the boycott

1982 Men's World Champions

Soviet Union
First title
