= Handball at the 1984 Summer Olympics – Men's tournament =

1984 Men's Olympic handball tournament
Tournament details
- Host country: United States
- Venue: 1 (in 1 host city)
- Dates: July 31 – August 11, 1984
- Teams: 12

Final positions
- Champions: Yugoslavia (2nd title)
- Runners-up: West Germany
- Third place: Romania
- Fourth place: Denmark

Tournament statistics
- Matches played: 36
- Goals scored: 1,502 (41.72 per match)
- Top scorers: (Sweden) Björn Jilsén (50 goals)

The men's tournament was one of two handball tournaments at the 1984 Summer Olympics. It was the fifth appearance of a men's handball tournament as a medal event at the Olympic Games.

== Results ==
=== Preliminary round ===
Teams in two groups played each other in a round to decide, for which place each of them should compete in the Final Round.

==== Group A ====
Rank	Team	Pld	W	D	L	GF	GA	Pts	(Socialist Federal Republic of Yugoslavia)	(Romania)	(Iceland)	(Switzerland)	(Japan)	(Algeria)
1.	Yugoslavia	5	4	1	0	123	76	9	X	19:18	22:22	25:11	32:15	25:10
2.	Romania	5	4	0	1	120	91	8	18:19	X	26:17	23:17	28:22	25:16
3.	Iceland	5	3	1	1	102	96	7	22:22	17:26	X	23:16	21:17	19:15
4.	Switzerland	5	2	0	3	83	102	4	11:25	17:23	16:23	X	20:13	19:18
5.	Japan	5	1	0	4	84	117	2	15:32	22:28	17:21	13:20	X	17:16
6.	Algeria	5	0	0	5	75	105	0	10:25	16:25	15:19	18:19	16:17	X

==== Group B ====
Rank	Team	Pld	W	D	L	GF	GA	Pts	(West Germany)	(Denmark)	(Sweden)	(Spain)	(United States)	(South Korea)
1.	West Germany	5	5	0	0	114	95	10	X	20:18	18:17	18:16	21:19	37:25
2.	Denmark	5	4	0	1	115	99	8	18:20	X	26:19	21:16	19:16	31:28
3.	Sweden	5	3	0	2	119	110	6	17:18	19:26	X	26:25	21:18	36:23
4.	Spain	5	2	0	3	105	106	4	16:18	16:21	25:26	X	17:16	31:25
5.	United States	5	0	1	4	91	100	1	19:21	16:19	18:21	16:17	X	22:22
6.	South Korea	5	0	1	4	123	157	1	25:37	28:31	23:36	25:31	22:22	X

=== Final Round ===
- 1st-placed teams from each group competed for the 1st place in this round;
- 2nd-placed - competed for the 3rd place
- 3rd-placed - competed for the 5th place
- 4th-placed - competed for the 7th place
- 5th-placed - competed for the 9th place
- 6th-placed - competed for the 11th place

All matches were held on 10 August.

11th place match

- South Korea 25-21 Algeria

9th place match

- United States 24-16 Japan

7th place match

- Switzerland 18-17 Spain

5th place match

- Sweden 26-24 Iceland

3rd place match

- Romania 23-19 Denmark

1st place match

- Yugoslavia 18-17 West Germany

== Summary ==
Place	Nation
1	Yugoslavia
	Coach: Branislav Pokrajac; Zlatan Arnautović (Borac Banja Luka); Mirko Bašić (Metaloplastika Šabac); Jovica Elezović (Proleter Zrenjanin); Mile Isaković (Metaloplastika Šabac); Pavle Jurina (Partizan Bjelovar); Milan Kalina (Crvena zvezda Beograd); Slobodan Kuzmanovski (Metaloplastika Šabac); Dragan Mladenović (Železničar Niš); Zdravko Rađenović (Schwabing/FRG); Momir Rnić (Proleter Zrenjanin); Branko Štrbac (Crvena zvezda Beograd); Veselin Vujović (Metaloplastika Šabac); Veselin Vuković (Metaloplastika Šabac); Zdravko Zovko (Medveščak-Infosistem) Rolando Pušnik (RK Crvenka)
2	West Germany
	13 Jochen Fraatz; Thomas Happe; Arnulf Meffle; Rüdiger Neitzel; 6 Michael Paul; Dirk Rauin; Siegfried Roch; Michael Roth; Ulrich Roth; 4 Martin Schwalb; Uwe Schwenker; 10 Thomas Springel; 1 Andreas Thiel; 12 Klaus Wöller; Erhard Wunderlich
3	Romania
	Coach: Radu Voina; Mircea Bedivan; Dumitru Berbece; Iosif Boroş; Alexandru Buligan; Gheorghe Covaciu; Gheorghe Dogărescu; Marian Dumitru; Cornel Durău; Alexandru Fölker; Nicolae Munteanu; Vasile Oprea; Adrian Simion; Vasile Stîngă; Neculai Vasilcă; Maricel Voinea
4	Denmark Morten Stig Christensen; Anders Dahl-Nielsen; Michael Fenger; Jørgen Gluver; Hans Henrik Hattesen; Carsten Haurum; Klaus Jensen; Mogens Jeppesen; Keld Nielsen; Erik Veje Rasmussen; Jens Erik Roepstorff; Per Skaarup; Poul Sørensen; Mikael Strøm
5	Sweden Göran Bengtsson; Per Carlén; Lennart Ebbinge; Lars-Erik Hansson; Claes Hellgren; Rolf Hertzberg; Björn Jilsén; Pär Jilsén; Mats Lindau; Christer Magnusson; Per Öberg; Peter Olofsson; Mats Olsson; Sten Sjögren; Danny Sjöberg-Augustsson
6	Iceland Þorbergur Aðalsteinsson; Kristján Arason; Steinar Birgisson; Jens Einarsson; Alfreð Gíslason; Bjarni Guðmundsson; Guðmundur Guðmundsson; Sigurður Gunnarsson; Atli Hilmarsson; Þorbjörn Jensson; Brynjar Kvaran; Þorgils Mathiesen; Jakob Sigurðsson; Sigurður Sveinsson; Einar Þorvarðarson
7	Switzerland Jürgen Bätschmann; René Barth; Markus Braun; Max Delhees; Roland Gassmann; Martin Glaser; Peter Hürlimann; Peter Jehle; Heinz Karrer; Uwe Mall; Martin Ott; Norwin Platzer; Martin Rubin; Max Schär; Peter Weber
8	Spain Cecilio Alonso; Juan Javier Cabanas; Juan de la Puente; Juan Pedro de Miguel; Pedro García; Rafael López; Agustín Milián; Juan Francisco Muñoz; José Ignacio Novoa; Jaime Puig; Javier Reino; Lorenzo Rico; Julián Ruiz; Eugenio Serrano; Juan José Uría
9	United States Coach: Javier Garcia; James Buehning; Robert Djokcvich; Tim Dykstra; Craig Gilbert; Steven Goss; William Kessler; Stephen Kirk; Peter Lash; Michael Lenard; Joseph McVein; Gregory Morava; Rod Oshita; Thomas Schneeberger; Joe Story Tim Funk
10	Japan Seimei Gamo; Takashi Ikenoue; Yasou Ikona; Hidetada Ito; Koji Matsui; Mitsuaki Nakamoto; Kiyoshi Nishiyama; Takahiro Ohata; Nobuo Sasaki; Kenzo Seki; Yoshihiro Shiga; Katsutoshi Taguchi; Seiichi Takamura; Yukihiko Uemura; Shinji Yamamoto
11	South Korea An Jin-su; Choi Geun-nyeon; Choi Tae-seop; Hwang Yak-na; Gang Deok-su; Gang Jae-won; Gang Tae-gu; Go Seok-chang; Lee Gwang-nam; Lee Sang-hyo; Im Gyu-ha; Im Yeong-cheol; Park Byeong-hong; Park Yeong-dae; Sim Jeong-man
12	Algeria Omar Azeb; Djaffar Bel Hocine; Abdelkrim Bendjemil; Abdel Salem Ben Magh Soula; Brahim Boudrali; Mourad Boussebt; Mustapha Doballah; Abu Sofiane Draouci; Hocine Ledra; Kamel Maoudj; Mouloud Meknache; Zineddine Mohamed Seghir; Rachid Mokrani; Kamel Ouchia; Azzedine Ouhib
