= Handball at the 1988 Summer Olympics – Men's team squads =

List of handball players

The following squads and players competed in the men's handball tournament at the 1988 Summer Olympics.

== Algeria ==
The following players represented Algeria:

- Makhlouf Aït Hocine
- Omar Azeb
- Ben Ali Beghouach
- Abdeslam Benmaghsoula
- Mahmoud Bouanik
- Salah Bouchekriou
- Abdelhak Bouhalissa
- Brahim Boudrali
- Mourad Boussebt
- Ahcene Djeffal
- Sofiane Draouci
- Fethnour Lacheheb
- Zineddine Mohamed Seghir
- Kamel Ouchia

== Czechoslovakia ==
The following players represented Czechoslovakia:

- Miroslav Bajgar
- Michal Barda
- Tomáš Bártek
- Petr Baumruk
- Milan Brestovanský
- Karel Jindřichovský
- Jiří Kotrč
- Peter Mesiarik
- Jan Novák
- Jozef Škandík
- Libor Sovadina
- František Štika
- Zdeněk Vaněk
- Milan Folta

== East Germany ==
The following players represented East Germany:

- Rüdiger Borchardt
- Jens Fiedler
- Mike Fuhrig
- Matthias Hahn
- Stephan Hauck
- Peter Hofmann
- Bernd Metzke
- Andreas Neitzel
- Peter Pysall
- Wieland Schmidt
- Holger Schneider
- Frank-Michael Wahl
- Holger Winselmann

== Hungary ==
The following players represented Hungary:

- Imre Bíró
- József Bordás
- Ottó Csicsay
- János Fodor
- János Gyurka
- László Hoffmann
- Mihály Iváncsik
- Mihály Kovács
- Péter Kovács
- László Marosi
- Tibor Oross
- Jakab Sibalin
- László Szabó
- Géza Tóth

== Iceland ==
The following players represented Iceland:

- Kristján Arason
- Alfreð Gíslason
- Guðmundur Guðmundsson
- Sigurður Gunnarsson
- Atli Hilmarsson
- Guðmundur Hrafnkelsson
- Brynjar Kvaran
- Þorgils Mathiesen
- Páll Ólafsson
- Bjarki Sigurðsson
- Jakob Sigurðsson
- Geir Sveinsson
- Sigurður Sveinsson
- Einar Þorvarðarson
- Karl Þráinsson

== Japan ==
The following players represented Japan:

- Izumi Fujii
- Yukihiro Hashimoto
- Hidetada Ito
- Kazuhiro Miyashita
- Yoshihiko Nikawadori
- Kiyoshi Nishiyama
- Shinji Okuda
- Shinichi Shudo
- Koji Tachiki
- Takashi Taguchi
- Seiichi Takamura
- Kenji Tamamura
- Kodo Yamamoto
- Toshiyuki Yamamura
- Hiroshi Yanai

== South Korea ==
The following players represented South Korea:

- Choi Suk-jae
- Kang Jae-won
- Kim Jae-hwan
- Koh Suk-chang
- Lee Sang-hyo
- Lim Jin-suk
- Noh Hyun-suk
- Oh Young-ki
- Park Do-hun
- Park Young-dae
- Shim Jae-hong
- Shin Young-suk
- Yoon Tae-il

== Soviet Union ==
The following players represented the Soviet Union:

- Vyacheslav Atavin
- Igor Chumak
- Valeri Gopin
- Aleksandr Karshakevich
- Andrey Lavrov
- Yuri Nesterov
- Voldemaras Novickis
- Aleksandr Rymanov
- Konstantin Sharovarov
- Yuri Shevtsov
- Georgi Sviridenko
- Aleksandr Tuchkin
- Andrey Tyumentsev
- Mikhail Vasilev

== Spain ==
The following players represented Spain:

- Juan Javier Cabanas
- Juan de la Puente
- Jesús Ángel Fernández
- Jaume Fort
- Jesús Gómez
- Ricardo Marín
- Juan Francisco Muñoz
- Jaime Puig
- Javier Reino
- Lorenzo Rico
- Julián Ruiz
- Joan Sagalés
- Eugenio Serrano
- Juan José Uría
- Miguel Ángel Zúñiga

== Sweden ==
The following players represented Sweden:

- Per Carlén
- Per Carlsson
- Johan Eklund
- Mats Fransson
- Erik Hajas
- Claes Hellgren
- Peder Järphag
- Björn Jilsén
- Pär Jilsén
- Ola Lindgren
- Staffan Olsson
- Mats Olsson
- Sten Sjögren
- Magnus Wislander

== United States ==
The following players represented the United States:

- Brian Bennett
- James Buehning
- Scott Driggers
- Craig Fitschen
- Steven Goss
- Bob Hillary
- Boyd Janny
- Bryant Johnson
- William Kessler
- Stephen Kirk
- Peter Lash
- Joseph McVein
- Rod Oshita
- Joe Story
- Mike Sullivan

== Yugoslavia ==
The following players represented Yugoslavia:

- Mirko Bašić
- Jožef Holpert
- Boris Jarak
- Slobodan Kuzmanovski
- Muhamed Memić
- Alvaro Načinović
- Goran Perkovac
- Zlatko Portner
- Iztok Puc
- Rolando Pušnik
- Momir Rnić
- Zlatko Saračević
- Irfan Smajlagić
- Ermin Velić
- Veselin Vujović
