= Iceland at the 1984 Summer Olympics =

- IOC code: ISL
- NOC: Olympic Committee of Iceland

in Los Angeles
- Competitors: 30 in 5 sports
- Flag bearer: Einar Vilhjálmsson
- Medals Ranked 43rd: Gold 0 Silver 0 Bronze 1 Total 1

Summer Olympics appearances (overview)
- 1908; 1912; 1920–1932; 1936; 1948; 1952; 1956; 1960; 1964; 1968; 1972; 1976; 1980; 1984; 1988; 1992; 1996; 2000; 2004; 2008; 2012; 2016; 2020; 2024

Iceland competed at the 1984 Summer Olympics in Los Angeles, United States.

== Medalists ==
Medal	Name	Sport	Event	Date
Bronze	Bjarni Friðriksson	Judo	Men's 95 kg	9 August

== Results by event ==
=== Athletics ===
Key

- Note–Ranks given for track events are within the athlete's heat only
- Q = Qualified for the next round
- q = Qualified for the next round as a fastest loser or, in field events, by position without achieving the qualifying target
- NR = National record
- N/A = Round not applicable for the event
- Bye = Athlete not required to compete in round

Men
Track & road events

Athlete	Event	Heat		Quarterfinals		Semifinal		Final	
Athlete	Event	Result	Rank	Result	Rank	Result	Rank	Result	Rank
Oddur Sigurðsson	400 m	46.30	2	46.07	7	Did not advance			

Field events

Athlete	Event	Qualification		Final	
Athlete	Event	Distance	Position	Distance	Position
Kristján Harðarson	long jump	7.09	22	Did not advance	
Vésteinn Hafsteinsson	discus throw	~~59.58~~	DSQ	Did not advance	
Einar Vilhjálmsson	javelin throw	80.94	10	81.58	6
Sigurður Einarsson	javelin throw	69.82	26	Did not advance	

Women
Field events

Athlete	Event	Qualification		Final	
Athlete	Event	Distance	Position	Distance	Position
Disa Gísladóttir	high jump	1.80	24	Did not advance	
Íris Grönfeldt	javelin thrown	48.70	22	Did not advance	

=== Handball ===
Summary

Key:

- ET – After extra time
- P – Match decided by penalty-shootout.

Team	Event	Group stage						5th to 12th places	Final / BM	
Team	Event	Opposition Score	Opposition Score	Opposition Score	Opposition Score	Opposition Score	Rank	Opposition Score	Opposition Score	Rank
Iceland men's	Men's tournament	Yugoslavia; D 22-22	Romania; L 17-26	Switzerland; W 23-16	Japan; W 21-17	Algeria; W 19-15	3	Sweden; L 24-26	Did not advance	6

Team Roster

- Þorbergur Aðalsteinsson
- Kristján Arason
- Steinar Birgisson
- Jens Einarsson
- Alfreð Gíslason
- Bjarni Guðmundsson
- Guðmundur Guðmundsson
- Sigurður Gunnarsson
- Atli Hilmarsson
- Þorbjörn Jensson
- Brynjar Kvaran
- Þorgils Mathiesen
- Jakob Sigurðsson
- Sigurður Sveinsson
- Einar Þorvarðarson

=== Judo ===
- Bjarni Friðriksson - Men's 95 kg Bronze
- Kolbeinn Gíslason - Men's open category

=== Sailing ===
Helmsman	Crew	Event	Race I		Race II		Race III		Race IV		Race V		Race VI		Race VII		Total Points	Total -1	Rank
Helmsman	Crew	Event	Rank	Points	Rank	Points	Rank	Points	Rank	Points	Rank	Points	Rank	Points	Rank	Points	Total Points	Total -1	Rank
Gunnlaugur Jonasson	Jon Petursson		18	24.0	12	18.0	~~DSQ~~	~~35.0~~	24	30.0	16	22.0	21	27.0	20	26.0	182.0	147.0	23

=== Swimming ===
Men

Athlete	Event	Heat		Final	
Athlete	Event	Time	Rank	Time	Rank
Ingi Jónsson	100 m freestyle	56.31	55	Did not advance	
Ingi Jónsson	200 m freestyle	2:02.23	47	Did not advance	
Ingi Jónsson	100 m butterfly	1:00.68	43	Did not advance	
Árni Sigurðsson	100 m breaststroke	1:08.52	38	Did not advance	
Árni Sigurðsson	200 m breaststroke	DSQ		Did not advance	
Tryggvi Helgason	100 m breaststroke	1:07.71 NR	33	Did not advance	
Tryggvi Helgason	200 m breaststroke	2:32.03	37	Did not advance	

Women

Athlete	Event	Heat		Final	
Athlete	Event	Time	Rank	Time	Rank
Guðrún Ágústsdóttir	100 m breaststroke	1:16.70	25	Did not advance	
Guðrún Ágústsdóttir	200 m breaststroke	2:44.85 NR	20	Did not advance	
