= Iceland at the 1988 Summer Olympics =

- IOC code: ISL
- NOC: Olympic Committee of Iceland

in Seoul
- Competitors: 32 (28 men and 4 women) in 5 sports
- Flag bearer: Bjarni Friðriksson
- Medals: Gold 0 Silver 0 Bronze 0 Total 0

Summer Olympics appearances (overview)
- 1908; 1912; 1920–1932; 1936; 1948; 1952; 1956; 1960; 1964; 1968; 1972; 1976; 1980; 1984; 1988; 1992; 1996; 2000; 2004; 2008; 2012; 2016; 2020; 2024

Iceland competed at the 1988 Summer Olympics in Seoul, South Korea.

== Competitors ==
The following is the list of number of competitors in the Games.

Sport	Men	Women	Total
Athletics	5	2	7
Handball	15	0	15
Judo	2	–	2
Sailing	2	0	2
Swimming	4	2	6
Total	28	4	32

== Results by event ==
=== Athletics ===
Key

- Note–Ranks given for track events are within the athlete's heat only
- Q = Qualified for the next round
- q = Qualified for the next round as a fastest loser or, in field events, by position without achieving the qualifying target
- NR = National record
- N/A = Round not applicable for the event
- Bye = Athlete not required to compete in round

Men
Field events

Athlete	Event	Qualification		Final	
Athlete	Event	Distance	Position	Distance	Position
Vésteinn Hafsteinsson	Discus throw	58.94		Did not advance	
Eggert Bogason	Discus throw	NM		Did not advance	
Einar Vilhjálmsson	Javelin throw	78.92		Did not advance	
Sigurður Einarsson	Javelin throw	75.52		Did not advance	
Pétur Guðmundsson	Shot put	19.21		Did not advance	

Women
Track & road events

Athlete	Event	Heat		Semifinal		Final	
Athlete	Event	Result	Rank	Result	Rank	Result	Rank
Helga Halldórsdóttir	400 m hurdles	58.99		Did not advance			

Field events

Athlete	Event	Qualification		Final	
Athlete	Event	Distance	Position	Distance	Position
Íris Grönfeldt	Javelin throw	54.28		Did not advance	

=== Handball ===
Summary

Key:

- ET – After extra time
- P – Match decided by penalty-shootout.

Team	Event	Group stage						5th to 12th places	Final / BM	
Team	Event	Opposition Score	Opposition Score	Opposition Score	Opposition Score	Opposition Score	Rank	Opposition Score	Opposition Score	Rank
Iceland men's	Men's tournament	United States; W 22-15	Algeria; W 22-16	Sweden; L 14-20	Yugoslavia; D 19-19	Soviet Union; L 19-32	4	East Germany; L 29-31	Did not advance	8

- Kristján Arason
- Alfreð Gíslason
- Guðmundur Guðmundsson
- Sigurður Gunnarsson
- Atli Hilmarsson
- Guðmundur Hrafnkelsson
- Brynjar Kvaran
- Þorgils Mathiesen
- Páll Ólafsson
- Bjarki Sigurðsson
- Jakob Sigurðsson
- Geir Sveinsson
- Sigurður Sveinsson
- Einar Þorvarðarson
- Karl Þráinsson

=== Judo ===
Men's 95 kg

- Bjarni Friðriksson

Men's +95 kg

- Sigurður Bergmann

=== Sailing ===
Men

Athlete	Event	Race I		Race II		Race III		Race IV		Race V		Race VI		Race VII		Total Points	Total -1
Athlete	Event	Rank	Points	Rank	Points	Rank	Points	Rank	Points	Rank	Points	Rank	Points	Rank	Points	Total Points	Total -1
Gunnlaugur Jonasson; Isleifur Fridriksson	470	21	27.0	17	23.0	20	26.0	15	21.0	DNF	36.0	21	27.0	16	22.0	182.0	146.0

=== Swimming ===
Men

Athlete	Event	Heat		Semifinal		Final	
Athlete	Event	Time	Rank	Time	Rank	Time	Rank
Magnús Ólafsson	50 m freestyle	24.50	40	Did not advance			
Magnús Ólafsson	100 m freestyle	52.01	31	Did not advance			
Magnús Ólafsson	200 m freestyle	1:53.05	28	Did not advance			
Ragnar Guðmundsson	400 m freestyle	4:05.12	37	Did not advance			
Ragnar Guðmundsson	1500 m freestyle	15:57.54	31	Did not advance			
Eðvarð Eðvarðsson	100 m backstroke	57.70		58.20	16	Did not advance	
Eðvarð Eðvarðsson	200 m backstroke	2:05.61	24	Did not advance			
Arnþór Ragnarsson	100 m breaststroke	1:07.93	50	Did not advance			
Arnþór Ragnarsson	200 m breaststroke	2:27.93	43	Did not advance			
Arnþór Ragnarsson	200 m individual medley	2:10.18	27	Did not advance			

Women

Athlete	Event	Heat		Semifinal		Final	
Athlete	Event	Time	Rank	Time	Rank	Time	Rank
Bryndís Ólafsdóttir	50 m freestyle	28.38	37	Did not advance			
Bryndís Ólafsdóttir	100 m freestyle	59.56	40	Did not advance			
Bryndís Ólafsdóttir	200 m freestyle	2:07.11	32	Did not advance			
Ragnheiður Runólfsdóttir	100 m breaststroke	1:13.01	23	Did not advance			
Ragnheiður Runólfsdóttir	200 m breaststroke	2:39.10	27	Did not advance			
Ragnheiður Runólfsdóttir	200 m individual medley	2:22.65	24	Did not advance			
