= Switzerland at the 1984 Summer Olympics =

- IOC code: SUI
- NOC: Swiss Olympic Association

in Los Angeles, United States 28 July 1984 – 12 August 1984
- Competitors: 129 (102 men and 27 women) in 18 sports
- Flag bearer: Christine Stückelberger
- Medals Ranked 26th: Gold 0 Silver 4 Bronze 4 Total 8

Summer Olympics appearances (overview)
- 1896; 1900; 1904; 1908; 1912; 1920; 1924; 1928; 1932; 1936; 1948; 1952; 1956; 1960; 1964; 1968; 1972; 1976; 1980; 1984; 1988; 1992; 1996; 2000; 2004; 2008; 2012; 2016; 2020; 2024

Other related appearances
- 1906 Intercalated Games

Switzerland competed at the 1984 Summer Olympics in Los Angeles, United States. 129 competitors, 102 men and 27 women, took part in 91 events in 18 sports.

== Medalists ==
Medal	Name	Sport	Event	Date
Silver	Daniel Nipkow	Shooting	Men's 50 metre rifle three positions	1 August
Silver	Alfred Achermann; Richard Trinkler; Laurent Vial; Benno Wiss	Cycling	Men's team time trial	5 August
Silver	Amy-Cathérine de Bary; Otto Hofer; Christine Stückelberger	Equestrian	Team dressage	9 August
Silver	Markus Ryffel	Athletics	Men's 5000 metres	11 August
Bronze	Hugo Dietsche	Wrestling	Men's Greco-Roman 62 kg	1 August
Bronze	Étienne Dagon	Swimming	Men's 200 metre breaststroke	2 August
Bronze	Otto Hofer	Equestrian	Individual dressage	10 August
Bronze	Heidi Robbiani	Equestrian	Individual jumping	12 August

== Archery ==
In Switzerland's third appearance in Olympic archery, two women and one man competed.

Women's Competition:

- Ursula Hess – 2473 points (→ 13th place)
- Vreny Burger – 2419 points (→ 27th place)

Men's Competition:

- Thomas Hardmeier – 2476 points (→ 20th place)

== Athletics ==
Men's 400 metres

- Marcel Arnold

- Heat — 46.46
- Quarterfinals — 46.10 (→ did not advance)

Men's 5,000 metres

- Markus Ryffel

- Heat — 13:46.16
- Semifinals — 13:40.08
- Final — 13:07.54 (→ Silver Medal)

Men's Marathon

- Bruno Lafranchi

- Final — 2:24:38 (→ 50th place)

Men's High Jump

- Roland Dalhäuser

- Qualification — 2.24m
- Final — no mark (→ no ranking)

Men's Long Jump

- René Gloor

- Qualification — 7.71m (→ did not advance, 13th place)

Men's Pole Vault

- Felix Böhni

- Qualifying Round — 5.40m
- Final — 5.30m (→ 7th place)

Men's Shot Put

- Werner Günthör

- Qualifying Round — 19.71 m
- Final — 20.28m (→ 5th place)

Men's Decathlon

- Michele Rüfenacht

- Final Result — 7924 points (→ 10th place)

- Patrick Vetterli

- Final Result — 7739 points (→ 13th place)

Women's 3,000 metres

- Cornelia Bürki

- Heat — 8:45.82
- Final — 8:45.20 (→ 5th place)

Women's Marathon

- Gabriela Andersen-Schiess

- Final — 2:48:42 (→ 37th place)

Women's Javelin Throw

- Regula Egger

- Qualification — 57.88m (→ did not advance)

Women's Heptathlon

- Corinne Schneider

- Final Result — 6042 points (→ 10th place)

== Cycling ==
Twelve cyclists represented Switzerland in 1984.

Individual road race

- Richard Trinkler — +1:43 (→ 10th place)
- Stefan Maurer — +3:37 (→ 12th place)
- Heinz Imboden — did not finish (→ no ranking)
- Benno Wiss — did not finish (→ no ranking)

Team time trial

- Alfred Achermann
- Richard Trinkler
- Laurent Vial
- Benno Wiss

Sprint

- Heinz Isler

1000m time trial

- Heinz Isler

Individual pursuit

- Jörg Müller
- Stephan Joho

Team pursuit

- Daniel Huwyler
- Hans Ledermann
- Hansruedi Märki
- Jörg Müller

Points race

- Jörg Müller
- Stephan Joho

== Fencing ==
Five fencers, all men, represented Switzerland in 1984

Men's épée

- Michel Poffet
- Daniel Giger
- Gabriel Nigon

Men's team épée

- Olivier Carrard, Daniel Giger, Gabriel Nigon, Michel Poffet, François Suchanecki

== Handball ==
Men's Team Competition

- Team Roster

- Jürgen Bätschmann
- René Barth
- Markus Braun
- Max Delhees
- Roland Gassmann
- Martin Glaser
- Peter Hürlimann
- Peter Jehle
- Heinz Karrer
- Uwe Mall
- Martin Ott
- Norwin Platzer
- Martin Rubin
- Max Schär
- Peter Weber

== Modern pentathlon ==
Three male modern pentathletes represented Switzerland in 1984.

Individual

- Andy Jung
- Peter Steinmann
- Peter Minder

Team

- Andy Jung
- Peter Steinmann
- Peter Minder

== Swimming ==
Men's 100m Freestyle

- Dano Halsall

- Heat — 50.91
- Final — 50.50 (→ 5th place)

- Stéfan Voléry

- Heat — 51.24
- B-Final — 51.42 (→ 10th place)

Men's 200m Freestyle

- Stéfan Voléry

- Heat — 1:54.19 (→ did not advance, 25th place)

- Thierry Jacot

- Heat — 1:56.54 (→ did not advance, 36th place)

Men's 100m Backstroke

- Patrick Ferland

- Heat — 58.78 (→ did not advance, 22nd place)

Men's 200m Backstroke

- Patrick Ferland

- Heat — 2:08.31 (→ did not advance, 22nd place)

Men's 100m Breaststroke

- Étienne Dagon

- Heat — 1:05.37 (→ did not advance, 20th place)

- Felix Morf

- Heat — 1:05.89 (→ did not advance, 23rd place)

Men's 200m Breaststroke

- Étienne Dagon

- Heat — 2:18.95
- Final — 2:17.41 (→ Bronze Medal)

- Felix Morf

- Heat — DSQ (→ did not advance, no ranking)

Men's 100m Butterfly

- Théophile David

- Heat — 55.81
- B-Final — 55.40 (→ 10th place)

- Dano Halsall

- Heat — 55.35
- B-Final — 55.51 (→ 11th place)

Men's 200m Butterfly

- Théophile David

- Heat — 2:03.21 (→ did not advance, 19th place)

Men's 4 × 100 m Freestyle Relay

- Dano Halsall, Stéfan Voléry, Thierry Jacot, and Roger Birrer

- Heat — 3:26.61 (→ did not advance, 9th place)

Men's 4 × 100 m Medley Relay

- Patrick Ferland, Étienne Dagon, Théophile David, and Dano Halsall

- Heat — 3:48.13
- Final — 3:47.93 (→ 7th place)

Women's 100m Freestyle

- Marie-Thérèse Armentero

- Heat — 58.73 (→ did not advance, 19th place)

Women's 400m Freestyle

- Nadia Krüger

- Heat — 4:28.20 (→ did not advance, 18th place)

Women's 800m Freestyle

- Nadia Krüger

- Heat — 9:07.95 (→ did not advance, 16th place)

Women's 4 × 100 m Medley Relay

- Eva Gysling, Patricia Brülhart, Carole Brook, and Marie-Thérèse Armentero

- Heat — 4:20.55
- Final — 4:19.02 (→ 6th place)

Women's 100m Backstroke

- Eva Gysling

- Heat — 1:05.18
- B-Final — 1:06.11 (→ 16th place)

Women's 200m Backstroke

- Eva Gysling

- Heat — 2:25.69 (→ did not advance, 24th place)

Women's 200m Butterfly

- Carole Brook

- Heat — 2:18.66
- B-Final — 2:16.74 (→ 15th place)
