= Sweden at the 1984 Summer Olympics =

- IOC code: SWE
- NOC: Swedish Olympic Committee

in Los Angeles
- Competitors: 174 (131 men and 43 women) in 19 sports
- Flag bearer: Hans Svensson
- Medals Ranked 16th: Gold 2 Silver 11 Bronze 6 Total 19

Summer Olympics appearances (overview)
- 1896; 1900; 1904; 1908; 1912; 1920; 1924; 1928; 1932; 1936; 1948; 1952; 1956; 1960; 1964; 1968; 1972; 1976; 1980; 1984; 1988; 1992; 1996; 2000; 2004; 2008; 2012; 2016; 2020; 2024

Other related appearances
- 1906 Intercalated Games

Sweden competed at the 1984 Summer Olympics in Los Angeles, California, United States. 174 competitors, 131 men and 43 women, took part in 138 events in 19 sports.

== Medalists ==
Medal	Name	Sport	Event	Date
Gold	Agneta Andersson	Canoeing	Women's K-1 500 metres	10 August
Gold	Agneta Andersson; Anna Olsson	Canoeing	Women's K-2 500 metres	10 August
Silver	Ragnar Skanåker	Shooting	Men's 50 metre pistol	29 July
Silver	Svante Rasmuson	Modern pentathlon	Men's individual	1 August
Silver	Kent-Olle Johansson	Wrestling	Men's Greco-Roman 62 kg	1 August
Silver	Roger Tallroth	Wrestling	Men's Greco-Roman 74 kg	2 August
Silver	Björne Väggö	Fencing	Men's épée	8 August
Silver	Lars-Erik Moberg	Canoeing	Men's K-1 500 metres	10 August
Silver	Per-Inge Bengtsson; Lars-Erik Moberg	Canoeing	Men's K-2 500 metres	10 August
Silver	Agneta Andersson; Eva Karlsson; Anna Olsson; Susanne Wiberg	Canoeing	Women's K-4 500 metres	11 August
Silver	Per-Inge Bengtsson; Tommy Karls; Lars-Erik Moberg; Thomas Ohlsson	Canoeing	Men's K-4 1000 metres	11 August
Silver	Bo Gustafsson	Athletics	Men's 50 kilometres walk	11 August
Silver	Patrik Sjöberg	Athletics	Men's high jump	11 August
Bronze	Per Johansson	Swimming	Men's 100 metre freestyle	31 July
Bronze	Frank Andersson	Wrestling	Men's Greco-Roman 90 kg	1 August
Bronze	Bengt Baron; Per Johansson; Thomas Lejdström; Mikael Örn	Swimming	Men's 4 × 100 metre freestyle relay	2 August
Bronze	Sören Claeson	Wrestling	Men's Greco-Roman 82 kg	3 August
Bronze	Kenth Eldebrink	Athletics	Men's javelin throw	5 August
Bronze	Ingamay Bylund; Ulla Håkansson; Louise Nathhorst	Equestrian	Team dressage	9 August

== Archery ==
Göran Bjerendal, a veteran of the 1980 Summer Olympics, became the second Swedish archer to place in the top eight and the first since 1972.

Women's Individual Competition:

- Liselotte Andersson – 2468 points (→ 14th place)
- Ylva Iversson – 2420 points (→ 26th place)

Men's Individual Competition:

- Göran Bjerendal – 2522 points (→ 6th place)
- Gert Bjerendal – 2481 points (→ 19th place)
- Tommy Quick – 2447 points (→ 27th place)

== Athletics ==
Men's Competition

Men's 400 metres

- Tommy Johansson

- Heat — 47.77 (→ did not advance)

Men's 5,000 metres

- Mats Erixon

- Heat — 13:44.45
- Semifinals — 13:29.72
- Final — 13:41.64 (→ 12th place)

Men's Marathon

- Tommy Persson — did not finish (→ no ranking)
- Kjell-Erik Ståhl — did not finish (→ no ranking)

Men's 50 km Walk

- Bo Gustafsson

- Final — 3:53:19 (→ Silver Medal)

- Bengt Simonsen

- Final — DSQ (→ no ranking)

- Roland Nilsson

- Final — DSQ (→ no ranking)

Men's High Jump

- Patrik Sjöberg

- Qualification — 2.24m
- Final — 2.33m (→ Silver Medal)

- Thomas Eriksson

- Qualification — 2.21m (→ did not advance)

Men's Triple Jump

- Thomas Eriksson

- Qualification — 15.97m (→ did not advance)

Men's Javelin Throw

- Kenth Eldebrink

- Qualification — 81.06m
- Final — 83.72m (→ Bronze Medal)

Men's Shot Put

- Sören Tallhem

- Qualifying Round — 19.94 m
- Final — 19.81 m (→ 7th place)

- Yngve Wahlander

- Qualifying Round — 18.28 m (→ did not advance)

Men's Discus Throw

- Stefan Fernholm

- Final — 63.22m (→ 8th place)

Men's Pole Vault

- Miro Zalar

- Qualifying Round — no mark (→ did not advance)

Women's Competition

Women's 1,500 metres

- Jill McCabe

- Heat — 4:16.48 (→ did not advance)

Women's 3,000 metres

- Eva Ernström

- Heat — 9.06.54 (→ did not advance)

Women's 400m Hurdles

- Ann-Louise Skoglund

- Heat — 55.75
- Semifinal — 55.17
- Final — 55.43 (→ 5th place)

Women's Marathon

- Midde Hamrin

- Final — 2:36:41 (→ 18th place)

Women's Long Jump

- Annette Tånnander

- Qualification — 6.16 m (→ did not advance, 14th place)

Women's Heptathlon

- Kristine Tånnander

- Final Result — 5985 points (→ 12th place)

- Annette Tånnander

- Final Result — 5908 points (→ 14th place)

== Boxing ==
Men's Lightweight

- Shadrach Odhiambo

Men's Light-Welterweight

- Stefan Sjöstrand

Men's Welterweight

- Vesa Koskela

Men's Light-Middleweight

- Lotfi Ayed

Men's Light-Heavyweight

- Christer Corpi

Men's Heavyweight

- Håkan Brock

== Cycling ==
Eleven cyclists, seven men and four women, represented Sweden in 1984.

Men's individual road race

- Per Christiansson
- Lars Wahlqvist
- Kjell Nilsson
- Stefan Brykt

Team time trial

- Bengt Asplund
- Per Christiansson
- Magnus Knutsson
- Håkan Larsson

Women's individual road race

- Kristina Ranudd — 15th place
- Tuulikki Jahre — 16th place
- Marianne Berglund — 25th place
- Paula Westher — 35th place

== Fencing ==
Six fencers, five men and one woman, represented Sweden in 1984.

Men's épée

- Björne Väggö
- Jerri Bergström
- Greger Forslöw

Men's team épée

- Jerri Bergström, Greger Forslöw, Kent Hjerpe, Jonas Rosén, Björne Väggö

Women's foil

- Kerstin Palm

== Handball ==
Summary

Key:

- ET: After extra time
- P – Match decided by penalty-shootout.

Team	Event	Group Stage						Final / BM / Pl.	
Team	Event	Opposition Score	Opposition Score	Opposition Score	Opposition Score	Opposition Score	Rank	Opposition Score	Rank
Sweden men's	Men's tournament	South Korea; W 36–23	United States; W 21–18	West Germany; L 17–18	Denmark; L 19–26	Spain; W 26–25	3 Q	Iceland; W 26–24	5

Men's Team Competition

- Preliminary Round (Group B)

- Defeated South Korea (36:23)
- Defeated United States (21:18)
- Lost to West Germany (17:18)
- Lost to Denmark (19:26)
- Defeated Spain (26:25)

- Classification Match

- 5th/6th place: Defeated Iceland (26:24) → 5th place

- Team Roster

- Göran Bengtsson
- Per Carlsén
- Lennart Ebbinge
- Lars-Erik Hansson
- Claes Hellgren
- Rolf Hertzberg
- Björn Jilsén
- Per Jilsén
- Mats Lindau
- Christer Magnusson
- Per Öberg
- Peter Olofsson
- Mats Olsson
- Sten Sjögren
- Danny Sjöberg-Augustsson

== Judo ==
Extra Lightweight, Men

- Anders Hellqvist (=18th)

Half Lightweight, Men

- Jörgen Häggqvist (Note: also competed in the 1992 Summer Olympics) (11th)

Half Middleweight, Men

- Per Kjellin (=14th)

Middleweight, Men

- Michel Grant (=12th)

== Modern pentathlon ==
Three male modern pentathletes represented Sweden in 1984. Svante Rasmuson won a silver medal in the individual event.

Individual

- Svante Rasmuson – 5456 points (→ Silver Medal)
- Martin Lamprecht – 4803 points (→ 30th place)
- Roderick Martin – 4205 points (→ 47th place)

Team

- Svante Rasmuson, Martin Lamprecht, Roderick Martin

== Swimming ==
Men's Competition

Men's 100m Freestyle

- Per Johansson

- Heat — 50.57
- Final — 50.31 (→ Bronze Medal)

- Thomas Lejdström

- Heat — 51.19
- B-Final — 51.64 (→ 13th place)

Men's 200m Freestyle

- Anders Holmertz

- Heat — 1:51.70
- B-Final — 1:52.44 (→ 12th place)

- Thomas Lejdström

- Heat — 1:51.76
- B-Final — 1:53.63 (→ 16th place)

Men's 400m Freestyle

- Anders Grillhammar

- Heat — 4:00.26 (→ did not advance, 21st place)

- Anders Holmertz

- Heat — 4:03.07 (→ did not advance, 23rd place)

Men's 1500m Freestyle

- Anders Holmertz

- Heat — 16:11.38 (→ did not advance, 22nd place)

Men's 100m Backstroke

- Bengt Baron

- Heat — 57.66
- Final — 57.34 (→ 6th place)

- Hans Fredin

- Heat — 58.39
- B-Final — 58.31 (→ 13th place)

Men's 200m Backstroke

- Michael Söderlund

- Heat — 2:05.85
- B-Final — 2:05.02 (→ 11th place)

- Hans Fredin

- Heat — 2:06.50 (→ did not advance, 18th place)

Men's 100m Breaststroke

- Peter Berggren

- Heat — 1:04.95
- B-Final — 1:05.66 (→ 16th place)

Men's 100m Butterfly

- Bengt Baron

- Heat — 54.67
- Final — 55.14 (→ 8th place)

Men's 200m Butterfly

- Thomas Lejdström

- Heat — 2:03.81 (→ did not advance, 20th place)

Men's 200m Individual Medley

- Mikael Örn

- Heat — 2:07.56
- B-Final — 2:11.79 (→ 16th place)

- Anders Peterson

- Heat — 2:08.35 (→ did not advance, 20th place)

Men's 400m Individual Medley

- Anders Peterson

- Heat — 4:32.93
- B-Final — 4:27.95 (→ 9th place)

Men's 4 × 100 m Freestyle Relay

- Richard Milton, Michael Söderlund, Mikael Örn, and Per Johansson

- Heat — 3:23.86

- Thomas Lejdström, Bengt Baron, Mikael Örn, and Per Johansson

- Final — 3:22.69 (→ Bronze Medal)

Men's 4 × 200 m Freestyle Relay

- Michael Söderlund, Tommy Werner, Mikael Örn, and Anders Holmertz

- Heat — 7:28.60

- Michael Söderlund, Tommy Werner, Anders Holmertz, and Thomas Lejdström

- Final — 7:26.53 (→ 6th place)

Men's 4 × 100 m Medley Relay

- Michael Söderlund, Peter Berggren, Bengt Baron, and Per Johansson

- Heat — 3:49.76

- Bengt Baron, Peter Berggren, Thomas Lejdström, and Per Johansson

- Final — 3:47.13 (→ 5th place)

Women's Competition

Women's 100m Freestyle

- Agneta Eriksson

- Heat — 58.43
- B-Final — 58.08 (→ 15th place)

- Maria Kardum

- Heat — 58.22
- B-Final — 58.12 (→ 16th place)

Women's 200m Freestyle

- Ann Linder

- Heat — 2:04.60
- B-Final — 2:03.85 (→ 12th place)

Women's 200m Freestyle

- Maria Kardum

- Heat — DNS (→ did not advance)

Women's 400m Freestyle

- Ann Linder

- Heat — 4:18.28
- B-Final — 4:17.55 (→ 11th place)

Women's 800m Freestyle

- Ann Linder

- Heat — 8:50.80 (→ did not advance, 9th place)

Women's 4 × 100 m Freestyle Relay

- Maria Kardum, Agneta Eriksson, Petra Hilder, and Malin Rundgren

- Heat — 3:52.27

- Maria Kardum, Agneta Eriksson, Petra Hilder, and Karin Furuhed

- Final — 3:51.24 (→ 7th place)

Women's 4 × 100 m Medley Relay

- Anna-Karin Eriksson, Eva-Marie Håkansson, Agneta Eriksson, and Maria Kardum

- Heat — 4:17.65
- Final — DSQ (→ no ranking)

Women's 100m Backstroke

- Anna-Karin Eriksson

- Heat — 1:06.09 (→ did not advance, 20th place)

Women's 200m Backstroke

- Sofia Kraft

- Heat — 2:19.73
- B-Final — 2:19.37 (→ 15th place)

Women's 200m Individual Medley

- Anette Philipsson

- Heat — 2:21.70
- B-Final — 2:21.54 (→ 12th place)

- Maria Kardum

- Heat — 2:22.87 (→ did not advance, 18th place)

Women's 400m Individual Medley

- Sofia Kraft

- Heat — 4:55.10
- B-Final — 4:53.25 (→ 10th place)
