= Algeria at the 1984 Summer Olympics =

- IOC code: ALG
- NOC: Algerian Olympic Committee

in Los Angeles
- Competitors: 32
- Flag bearer: Abdelkrim Bendjemil
- Medals Ranked 42nd: Gold 0 Silver 0 Bronze 2 Total 2

Summer Olympics appearances (overview)
- 1964; 1968; 1972; 1976; 1980; 1984; 1988; 1992; 1996; 2000; 2004; 2008; 2012; 2016; 2020; 2024; 2028

Other related appearances
- France (1896–1960)

Algeria competed at the 1984 Summer Olympics in Los Angeles, United States. That nation won its first ever Olympic medals at these Games.

== Medalists ==
Medal	Name	Sport	Event	Date
Bronze	Mustapha Moussa	Boxing	Men's Light Heavyweight	9 August
Bronze	Mohamed Zaoui	Boxing	Men's Middleweight	9 August

== Results by event ==
=== Athletics ===
Men's 200 metres

- Ali Bakhta

Men's 800 metres

- Ahmed Belkessam

Men's 1,500 metres

- Mehdi Aidet
- Abderrahmane Morceli

Men's 5,000 metres

- Abdelrazzak Bounour
  - Heat — 13:51.52
  - Semifinals — 13:57.43 (→ did not advance)

Men's 110 metres Hurdles

- Mohamed Ryad Benhaddad

Men's 20 km Walk

- Abdelouahab Ferguene
  - Final — 1:31:24 (→ 26th place)
- Benamar Kechkouche
  - Final — 1:34:12 (→ 30th place)

Men's Hammer Throw

- Hakim Toumi
  - Qualification — 67.68m (→ did not advance)

=== Boxing ===
Men's Bantamweight (– 54 kg)

- Mustapha Kouchene
  1. First Round — Bye
  2. Second Round — Lost to Dale Walters (Canada), 0-5

Men's Bantamweight (– 57 kg)

- Azzedine Said
  1. First Round — Bye
  2. Second Round — Lost to Omar Catari (Venezuela), after referee stopped contest in second round

Men's Bantamweight (– 63,5 kg)

- Ahmed Hadjala
  1. First Round — Bye
  2. Second Round — Defeated Umesh Maskey (Nepal), after referee stopped contest in second round
  3. Third Round – Lost to Jean Mbereke (Cameroon), on points (1:4)

Men's Bantamweight (– 67,5 kg)

- Kamel Abboud
  1. First Round — Bye
  2. Second Round — Defeated Henry Kalunga (Zambia), on points (5:0)
  3. Third Round – Lost to Alexander Küzler (West Germany), on points (1:4)

Men's Middleweight (– 75 kg)

- Mohamed Zaoui → Bronze Medal
  1. First Round – Bye
  2. Second Round – Defeated Tsiu Monne (Lesotho), after referee stopped contest in second round
  3. Quarterfinals – Defeated Moses Mwaba (Zambia), on points (4:1)
  4. Semifinals – Lost to Virgil Hill (United States), on points (0:5)

Men's Middleweight (– 81 kg)

- Mustapha Moussa → Bronze Medal
  1. First Round – Bye
  2. Second Round – Defeated Drake Thadzi (Malawi), on points (5:0)
  3. Quarterfinals – Defeated Anthony Wilson (Great Britain), on points (5:0)
  4. Semifinals – Lost to Anton Josipović (Yugoslavia), on points (0:5)

Men's Bantamweight (– 91 kg)

- Mohamed Bouchiche
  1. First Round — Bye
  2. Second Round — Lost to Willie DeWit (Canada), on points (0:5)

=== Handball ===
==== Men's team competition ====
- Preliminary Round (Group A)
  - Lost to Yugoslavia (10:25)
  - Lost to Romania (16:25)
  - Lost to Iceland (15:19)
  - Lost to Switzerland (18:19)
  - Lost to Japan (16:17)
- Classification Match
  - 11th/12th place: Lost to South Korea (21:25) → 12th place
- Team Roster
  - Omar Azeb
  - Djaffar Belhocine
  - Abdelkrim Bendjemil
  - Abdesselam Benmaghsoula
  - Brahim Boudrali
  - Mourad Boussebt
  - Mustapha Doballah
  - Abu Sofiane Draouci (Note: also competed at the 1988 Summer Olympics)
  - Hocine Ledra
  - Kamel Maoudj
  - Mouloud Meknache
  - Zine Mohamed Seghir
  - Rachid Mokrani
  - Kamel Ouchia
  - Azzedine Ouhib
