= Handball at the 1982 Asian Games =

- Venue: Delhi University Grounds
- Date: 23–30 November 1982
- Nations: 8

The Handball events at the 1982 Asian Games were held in New Delhi, India between 19 November and 4 December 1982. The competition included only men's event.

== Medalists ==
Event	Gold	Silver	Bronze
Men	China; Cai Jianguo; Deng Shanjun; Gao Zhongxin; Hu Weidong; Jin Bailan; Li Yingcai; Min Yue; Song Anwen; Sun Tie; Wang Xiong; Wang Yueting; Wei Heping; Wu Mingqun; Xie Jiyong	Japan; Seimei Gamo; Takashi Ikenoue; Yasuo Ikoma; Eiichi Ino; Hidetada Ito; Koji Matsui; Toru Nagano; Kiyoshi Nishiyama; Takahiro Ohata; Koji Saito; Yoshihiro Shiga; Shunji Takagi; Akira Tsugawa; Shinji Yamamoto	South Korea; Choi Jung-ho; Choi Tae-sup; Kang Duck-soo; Kang Jae-won; Kang Sae-yong; Kang Tae-koo; Kim Young-nam; Lee In-chul; Lee Sang-hyo; Lee Sang-woo; Lim Jae-sik; Lim Kyu-ha; Lim Young-chul; Oh Sae-hoon; Park Byung-hong; Shim Jung-man

== Results ==
=== Main round ===
==== Group A ====
Pos	Team	Pld	W	D	L	GF	GA	GD	Pts	Qualification
1	Japan	3	3	0	0	86	51	+35	6	Semifinals
2	Kuwait	3	2	0	1	85	61	+24	4	Semifinals
3	United Arab Emirates	3	1	0	2	71	92	−21	2	Placement 5–6
4	India	3	0	0	3	57	95	−38	0	Placement 7–8

Source: Results

23 November	Japan	35–19	United Arab Emirates	Delhi University Grounds, New Delhi

24 November	Kuwait	36–17	India	Delhi University Grounds, New Delhi

25 November	Kuwait	29–19	United Arab Emirates	Delhi University Grounds, New Delhi

25 November	Japan	26–12	India	Delhi University Grounds, New Delhi

26 November	Japan	25–20	Kuwait	Delhi University Grounds, New Delhi

27 November	India	28–33	United Arab Emirates	Delhi University Grounds, New Delhi

==== Group B ====
Pos	Team	Pld	W	D	L	GF	GA	GD	Pts	Qualification
1	China	3	3	0	0	78	62	+16	6	Semifinals
2	South Korea	3	2	0	1	94	71	+23	4	Semifinals
3	Saudi Arabia	3	1	0	2	52	67	−15	2	Placement 5–6
4	Bahrain	3	0	0	3	53	77	−24	0	Placement 7–8

Source: Results

23 November	China	28–15	Bahrain	Delhi University Grounds, New Delhi

24 November	South Korea	32–18	Saudi Arabia	Delhi University Grounds, New Delhi

25 November	South Korea	34–24	Bahrain	Delhi University Grounds, New Delhi

25 November	China	21–19	Saudi Arabia	Delhi University Grounds, New Delhi

26 November	Saudi Arabia	15–14	Bahrain	Delhi University Grounds, New Delhi

27 November	China	29–28	South Korea	Delhi University Grounds, New Delhi

=== Classification 5th–8th ===
==== Placement 7–8 ====
28 November	India	16–31	Bahrain	Delhi University Grounds, New Delhi

==== Placement 5–6 ====
28 November	United Arab Emirates	28–34	Saudi Arabia	Delhi University Grounds, New Delhi

=== Final round ===
Semifinals
28 November
Japan	21
South Korea	20
28 November
China	28
Kuwait	24

Gold medal match
30 November
Japan	19
China	24
Bronze medal match
30 November
South Korea	32
Kuwait	22

==== Semifinals ====
28 November	Japan	21–20	South Korea	Delhi University Grounds, New Delhi

28 November	China	28–24	Kuwait	Delhi University Grounds, New Delhi

==== Bronze medal match ====
30 November	South Korea	32–22	Kuwait	Delhi University Grounds, New Delhi

==== Gold medal match ====
30 November	Japan	19–24	China	Delhi University Grounds, New Delhi

== Final standing ==
Rank	Team	Pld	W	D	L
1st place, gold medalist(s)	China	5	5	0	0
2nd place, silver medalist(s)	Japan	5	4	0	1
3rd place, bronze medalist(s)	South Korea	5	3	0	2
4	Kuwait	5	2	0	3
5	Saudi Arabia	4	2	0	2
6	United Arab Emirates	4	1	0	3
7	Bahrain	4	1	0	3
8	India	4	0	0	4
