= Lin Yingzhe =

Lin Yingzhe may refer to following individuals of which name in Chinese character can be transliterated to Hanyu Pinyin:

- 林英哲 (Lín Yīngzhé; born 1952), Japanese musician
- 林英喆 (Lín Yīngzhé; born 1960), South Korea handball coach
