= Yukihiko =

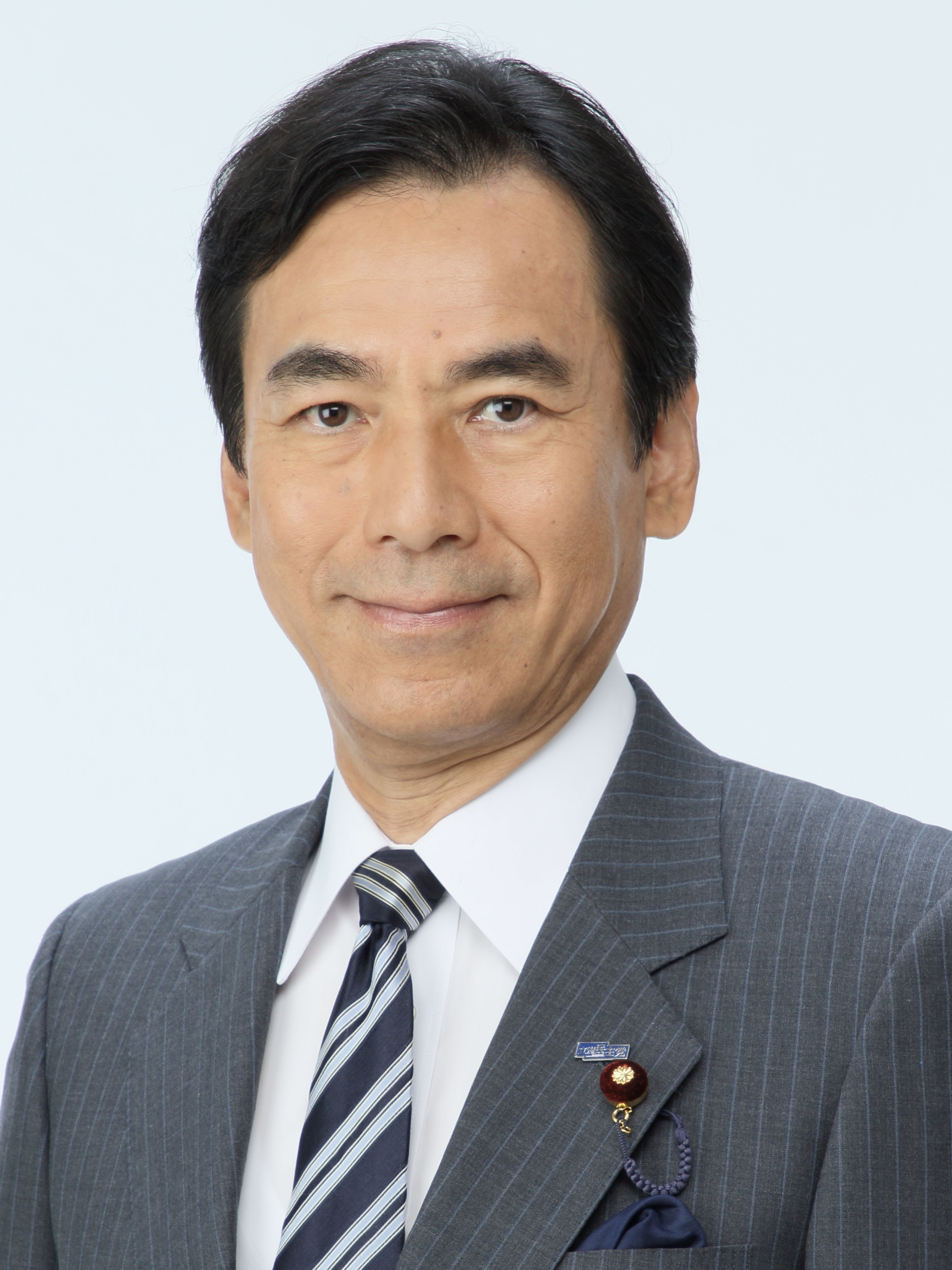
- Yukihiko Akutsu, Japanese politician
- Pronunciation: jɯkʲiçiko (IPA)
- Gender: Male

Origin
- Origin: Japanese
- Meaning: Different meanings depending on the kanji used

Yukihiko is a masculine Japanese given name.

== Written forms ==
Yukihiko can be written using different combinations of kanji characters. Here are some examples:

- 幸彦, "happiness, elegant boy"
- 幸比古, "happiness, young man (archaic)"
- 行彦, "to go, elegant boy"
- 行比古, "to go, young man (archaic)"
- 之彦, "of, elegant boy"
- 志彦, "determination, elegant boy"
- 雪彦, "snow, elegant boy"
- 恭彦, "respectful, elegant boy"
- 由起彦, "reason, to rise, elegant boy"
- 由紀彦, "reason, chronicle, elegant boy"
- 有紀彦, "to have, chronicle, elegant boy"

The name can also be written in hiragana ゆきひこ or katakana ユキヒコ.

== Notable people with the name ==
- Yukihiko Akutsu (阿久津 幸彦; born 1956), Japanese politician
- Yukihiko Haida (灰田 有紀彦; 1909–1986), Japanese composer and musician
- Yukihiko Ikeda (池田 行彦; 1937–2004), Japanese politician
- Yukihiko Kusunose (楠瀬 幸彦; 1858–1927), Japanese general
- Yukihiko Satō (佐藤 由紀彦; born 1976), Japanese footballer
- Yukihiko Tsutsumi (堤 幸彦; born 1955), Japanese television and film director
- Yukihiko Uemura (上村 幸彦; born 1959), Japanese handball player
- Yukihiko Yaguchi (矢口 幸彦; born 1955), Japanese automotive engineer
- Yukihiko Yasuda (安田 靫彦; 1884–1978), pseudonym of Shinzaburō Yasuda, Japanese painter
