= Jesús Gómez =

Jesús Gómez may refer to:

- Jesús Gómez (American football) (born 2003), Mexican-American football player
- Jesús Gómez (equestrian) (1941–2017), Mexican equestrian
- Jesús Gómez (handballer) (born 1965), Spanish handball player
- Jesús Gómez Alonso (1952–2006), Spanish social scientist
- Alejandro Gómez (Bolivian footballer), born Jesús Alejandro Gómez Lanza (born 1979), Bolivian footballer
- Jesús Alejandro Gómez (Mexican footballer) (born 2002), Mexican footballer
- Jesús Gómez (footballer, born 1984) (born 1984), Venezuelan footballer
- Jesús Gómez (runner) (born 1991), Spanish middle-distance runner
- Jesús Gómez (sprinter) (born 1999), Spanish sprinter
