= List of Västra Frölunda IF sections =

Västra Frölunda IF is a Swedish football club in Gothenburg. The sports club includes the following sections:

- Västra Frölunda IF Bowling, bowling section
- Västra Frölunda IF Handball, handball section
- Frölunda HC, ice hockey
