= Morf (surname) =

Morf is a surname and notable people with this surname are as follows:

- Doris Morf (1927–2003), Swiss author, journalist and politician
- Felix Morf (born 1962), Swiss swimmer
- Fritz Morf (1928–2011), Swiss football player
- Heinrich Morf (1854–1921), Swiss linguist and literary historian
- René Morf (born 1969), Swiss football player
