= Katsutoshi =

- Gender: Male

Origin
- Origin: Japanese
- Meaning: Different meanings depending on the kanji used

Katsutoshi (written: 勝敏, 勝利, 勝俊, 勝年 or 克俊) is a masculine Japanese given name. Notable people with the name include:

- Katsutoshi Domori (堂森 勝利; born 1976), Japanese footballer
- Hasegawa Katsutoshi (長谷川 勝敏; born 1944), Japanese sumo wrestler
- Katsutoshi Kaneda (金田 勝年; born 1949), Japanese politician
- Katsutoshi Kawamura (川村 克俊; born 1954), Japanese ice hockey player
- Katsutoshi Kawano (河野 克俊; born 1954), Japanese admiral
- Katsutoshi Nagasawa (長沢 勝俊; 1923–2008), Japanese composer
- Katsutoshi Naito (内藤 克俊; 1911–1957), Japanese sport wrestler
- Katsutoshi Nekoda (猫田 勝敏; 1944–1983), Japanese volleyball player
- Katsutoshi Okubo (大久保 勝利; born 1943), Japanese Nordic combined skier
- Katsutoshi Shiina (born 1961), Japanese karateka
- Katsutoshi Taguchi (田口 勝利; born 1961), Japanese handball player
- Katsutoshi Tsumagari (津曲 勝利; born 1975), Japanese volleyball player
