= 1990 World Men's Handball Championship =

Tournament details
- Host country: Czechoslovakia
- Dates: 28 February – 10 March
- Teams: 16

Final positions
- Champions: Sweden (3rd title)
- Runner-up: Soviet Union
- Third place: Romania
- Fourth place: Yugoslavia

Tournament statistics
- Matches played: 54
- Goals scored: 2,443 (45.24 per match)
- Top scorer(s): (Cuba) Julián Duranona (Soviet Union) Aleksandr Tuchkin (55 goals each)

Awards
- Best player: (France) Jackson Richardson

The 1990 World Men's Handball Championship was the 12th team handball World Championship. It was held in Czechoslovakia from February 28 to March 10, 1990. Sweden won the championship.

== Qualification ==
Competition	Vacancies	Qualified
Host nation	1	Czechoslovakia
1988 Summer Olympics	6	Soviet Union; South Korea; Yugoslavia; Hungary; Sweden; East Germany
1989 World Men's Handball Championship Group B	6	Iceland; Poland; Romania; Spain; France; Switzerland
1989 Asian Men's Handball Championship	1	Japan
1989 African Men's Handball Championship	1	Algeria
1989 Pan American Men's Handball Championship	1	Cuba

== Teams ==
Group A	Group B	Group C	Group D
Algeria	Czechoslovakia	Cuba	East Germany
France	Romania	Iceland	Japan
Hungary	South Korea	Spain	Poland
Sweden	Switzerland	Yugoslavia	Soviet Union

== Preliminary round ==
=== Group A ===
Pos	Team	Pld	W	D	L	GF	GA	GD	Pts	Qualification
1	Sweden	3	3	0	0	71	57	+14	6	Main round
2	Hungary	3	2	0	1	61	59	+2	4	Main round
3	France	3	1	0	2	59	65	−6	2	Main round
4	Algeria	3	0	0	3	55	65	−10	0	Ranking round

Source: IHF

28 February 1990	Hungary	19–18	France	Plzeň
28 February 1990		(9–7)		Plzeň

28 February 1990	Sweden	20–19	Algeria	Plzeň
28 February 1990		(11–8)		Plzeň

1 March 1990	Algeria	16–22	Hungary	Plzeň
1 March 1990		(7–11)		Plzeň

1 March 1990	France	18–26	Sweden	Plzeň
1 March 1990		(9–13)		Plzeň

3 March 1990	Hungary	20–25	Sweden	Plzeň
3 March 1990		(8–14)		Plzeň

3 March 1990	France	23–20	Algeria	Plzeň
3 March 1990		(7–7)		Plzeň

=== Group B ===
Pos	Team	Pld	W	D	L	GF	GA	GD	Pts	Qualification
1	Romania	3	3	0	0	75	57	+18	6	Main round
2	South Korea	3	1	0	2	69	72	−3	2	Main round
3	Czechoslovakia (H)	3	1	0	2	58	62	−4	2	Main round
4	Switzerland	3	1	0	2	46	57	−11	2	Ranking round

Source: IHF
(H) Hosts

28 February 1990	South Korea	24–26	Romania	Prešov
28 February 1990		(12–12)		Prešov

28 February 1990	Czechoslovakia	12–13	Switzerland	Prešov
28 February 1990		(5–7)		Prešov

1 March 1990	Switzerland	17–21	South Korea	Prešov
1 March 1990		(5–11)		Prešov

1 March 1990	Romania	25–17	Czechoslovakia	Prešov
1 March 1990		(11–9)		Prešov

3 March 1990	South Korea	24–29	Czechoslovakia	Prešov
3 March 1990		(10–17)		Prešov

3 March 1990	Romania	24–16	Switzerland	Prešov
3 March 1990		(12–8)		Prešov

=== Group C ===
Pos	Team	Pld	W	D	L	GF	GA	GD	Pts	Qualification
1	Spain	3	3	0	0	66	61	+5	6	Main round
2	Yugoslavia	3	2	0	1	72	65	+7	4	Main round
3	Iceland	3	1	0	2	65	69	−4	2	Main round
4	Cuba	3	0	0	3	76	84	−8	0	Ranking round

Source: IHF

28 February 1990	Yugoslavia	17–18	Spain	Zlín
28 February 1990		(9–6)		Zlín

28 February 1990	Iceland	27–23	Cuba	Zlín
28 February 1990		(17–8)		Zlín

1 March 1990	Cuba	27–28	Yugoslavia	Zlín
1 March 1990		(14–16)		Zlín

1 March 1990	Spain	19–18	Iceland	Zlín
1 March 1990		(11–11)		Zlín

3 March 1990	Yugoslavia	27–20	Iceland	Zlín
3 March 1990		(10–11)		Zlín

3 March 1990	Spain	29–26	Cuba	Zlín
3 March 1990		(12–10)		Zlín

=== Group D ===
Pos	Team	Pld	W	D	L	GF	GA	GD	Pts	Qualification
1	Soviet Union	3	3	0	0	95	56	+39	6	Main round
2	East Germany	3	2	0	1	70	73	−3	4	Main round
3	Poland	3	1	0	2	63	68	−5	2	Main round
4	Japan	3	0	0	3	55	86	−31	0	Ranking round

Source: IHF

28 February 1990	Soviet Union	26–21	Poland	Žilina
28 February 1990		(13–9)		Žilina

28 February 1990	East Germany	26–22	Japan	Žilina
28 February 1990		(18–7)		Žilina

1 March 1990	Japan	16–35	Soviet Union	Žilina
1 March 1990		(14–16)		Žilina

1 March 1990	Poland	17–25	East Germany	Žilina
1 March 1990		(9–9)		Žilina

3 March 1990	Soviet Union	34–19	East Germany	Žilina
3 March 1990		(15–10)		Žilina

3 March 1990	Poland	25–17	Japan	Žilina
3 March 1990		(12–11)		Žilina

== Ranking round ==
Pos	Team	Pld	W	D	L	GF	GA	GD	Pts
13	Switzerland	3	3	0	0	76	56	+20	6
14	Cuba	3	1	1	1	69	72	−3	3
15	Japan	3	1	0	2	53	65	−12	2
16	Algeria	3	0	1	2	58	63	−5	1

Source: IHF

5 March 1990	Algeria	20–20	Cuba	Zlín
5 March 1990		(8–11)		Zlín

5 March 1990	Switzerland	22–12	Japan	Zlín
5 March 1990		(15–3)		Zlín

6 March 1990	Japan	21–20	Algeria	Zlín
6 March 1990		(10–10)		Zlín

6 March 1990	Cuba	26–32	Switzerland	Zlín
6 March 1990		(11–16)		Zlín

8 March 1990	Algeria	18–22	Switzerland	Zlín
8 March 1990		(10–14)		Zlín

8 March 1990	Cuba	23–20	Japan	Zlín
8 March 1990		(10–13)		Zlín

== Main round ==
=== Group I ===
Pos	Team	Pld	W	D	L	GF	GA	GD	Pts	Qualification
1	Sweden	5	4	0	1	130	101	+29	8	Final
2	Romania	5	4	0	1	117	105	+12	8	Third place game
3	Hungary	5	3	1	1	110	108	+2	7	Fifth place game
4	Czechoslovakia (H)	5	1	2	2	107	116	−9	4	Seventh place game
5	France	5	1	1	3	109	115	−6	3	Ninth place game
6	South Korea	5	0	0	5	119	147	−28	0	Eleventh place game

Source: IHF
(H) Hosts

5 March 1990	Sweden	26–20	Czechoslovakia	Ostrava
5 March 1990		(15–9)		Ostrava

5 March 1990	Hungary	27–24	South Korea	Ostrava
5 March 1990		(14–11)		Ostrava

5 March 1990	France	21–25	Romania	Ostrava
5 March 1990		(11–12)		Ostrava

6 March 1990	Czechoslovakia	21–21	France	Ostrava
6 March 1990		(9–9)		Ostrava

6 March 1990	Romania	21–24	Hungary	Ostrava
6 March 1990		(10–13)		Ostrava

6 March 1990	South Korea	23–34	Sweden	Ostrava
6 March 1990		(7–17)		Ostrava

7 March 1990	France	31–24	South Korea	Ostrava
7 March 1990		(13–12)		Ostrava

7 March 1990	Hungary	20–20	Czechoslovakia	Ostrava
7 March 1990		(8–10)		Ostrava

7 March 1990	Sweden	19–20	Romania	Ostrava
7 March 1990		(9–12)		Ostrava

=== Group II ===
Pos	Team	Pld	W	D	L	GF	GA	GD	Pts	Qualification
1	Soviet Union	5	5	0	0	148	109	+39	10	Final
2	Yugoslavia	5	3	0	2	120	102	+18	6	Third place game
3	Spain	5	3	0	2	109	114	−5	6	Fifth place game
4	East Germany	5	2	0	3	106	111	−5	4	Seventh place game
5	Iceland	5	1	0	4	101	117	−16	2	Ninth place game
6	Poland	5	1	0	4	102	133	−31	2	Eleventh place game

Source: IHF

5 March 1990	Spain	24–17	Poland	Bratislava
5 March 1990		(12–10)		Bratislava

5 March 1990	Yugoslavia	21–20	East Germany	Bratislava
5 March 1990		(9–11)		Bratislava

5 March 1990	Iceland	19–27	Soviet Union	Bratislava
5 March 1990		(8–14)		Bratislava

6 March 1990	Soviet Union	24–22	Yugoslavia	Bratislava
6 March 1990		(11–8)		Bratislava

6 March 1990	Poland	27–25	Iceland	Bratislava
6 March 1990		(11–13)		Bratislava

6 March 1990	East Germany	25–20	Spain	Bratislava
6 March 1990		(9–11)		Bratislava

7 March 1990	Spain	28–37	Soviet Union	Bratislava
7 March 1990		(14–17)		Bratislava

7 March 1990	Yugoslavia	33–20	Poland	Bratislava
7 March 1990		(18–10)		Bratislava

8 March 1990	Iceland	19–17	East Germany	Bratislava
8 March 1990		(8–12)		Bratislava

== Placement round ==
=== Eleventh place game ===
9 March 1990; 17:30	South Korea	27–33	Poland	Prague
9 March 1990; 17:30		(13–13)		Prague

=== Ninth place game ===
10 March 1990; 09:00	France	29–23	Iceland	Prague
10 March 1990; 09:00		(15–11)		Prague

=== Seventh place game ===
10 March 1990; 11:00	Czechoslovakia	17–16	East Germany	Prague
10 March 1990; 11:00		(8–6)		Prague

=== Fifth place game ===
9 March 1990; 20:00	Hungary	19–23	Spain	Prague
9 March 1990; 20:00		(8–10)		Prague

=== Third place game ===
10 March 1990; 13:30	Romania	27–21	Yugoslavia	Prague
10 March 1990; 13:30		(10–12)		Prague

=== Final ===
10 March 1990; 16:30	Sweden	27–23	Soviet Union	Prague
10 March 1990; 16:30		(11–12)		Prague

== Final standings ==
Rank	Team
Gold medal	Sweden
Silver medal	Soviet Union
Bronze medal	Romania
4	Yugoslavia
5	Spain
6	Hungary
7	Czechoslovakia
8	East Germany
9	France
10	Iceland
11	Poland
12	South Korea
13	Switzerland
14	Cuba
15	Japan
16	Algeria

Qualified for the 1992 Summer Olympics
Qualified for the 1992 Summer Olympics but banned due to UN sanctions
Qualified for the 1992 Summer Olympics as host
Qualified for the 1992 Summer Olympics in replacement of Yugoslavia

1990 Men's World Champions

Sweden
Third title

== Medal summary ==
Gold	Silver	Bronze
Sweden Magnus Andersson; Per Carlén; Magnus Cato; Johan Eklund; Mats Fransson; Erik Hajas; Björn Jilsén; Ola Lindgren; Mats Olsson; Staffan Olsson; Jonas Persson; Axel Sjöblad; Sten Sjögren; Tomas Svensson; Pierre Thorsson; Magnus Wislander	Soviet Union Vyacheslav Atavin; Yuri Gavrilov; Valeri Gopin; Aleksandr Karshakevich; Oleg Kiselyov; Igor Kustov; Andrey Lavrov; Yuri Nesterov; Konstantin Sharovarov; Georgi Sviridenko; Igor Tchumak; Aleksandr Tuchkin; Andrey Tyumentsev; Valeri Vassilyev; Andrei Xepkin; Mikhail Yakimovich	Romania Dumitru Berbece; Alexandru Buligan; Ianos Cicu; Vasile Cocuz; Marian Dumitru; Cornel Durau; Adrian Ghimes; Robert Licu; Ion Mocanu; Costica Neagu; Nicolae Popescu; Rudi Prisacaru; Maricel Voinea; Valentin Cristian Zaharia

== Top goalscorers ==
Rank	Player	Goals
1	(Cuba) Julián Duranona	55
1	(Soviet Union) Aleksandr Tuchkin	55
3	(South Korea) Kim Jae-hwan	50
4	(France) Philippe Debureau	39
5	(Socialist Federal Republic of Yugoslavia) Irfan Smajlagić	38
6	(Algeria) Djaffar Bel Hocine	37
6	(Romania) Marian Dumitru	37
8	(Spain) Javier Cabanas	36
8	(Spain) Aleix Franch	36
8	(Hungary) László Marosi	36
8	(Poland) Bogdan Wenta	36
