= Mitsuaki =

- Gender: Male

Origin
- Origin: Japanese
- Meaning: Different meanings depending on the kanji used

Mitsuaki (written: 光昭, 光明, 光顕, 充昭 or 満明) is a masculine Japanese given name. Notable people with the name include:

== People ==
- Mitsuaki Hoshino (星野 充昭; born 1959), Japanese actor and voice actor
- Mitsuaki Iwagō (岩合 光昭; born 1950), Japanese photographer
- Mitsuaki Kojima (小島 光顕; born 1968), Japanese footballer
- Mitsuaki Madono (真殿 光昭; born 1964), Japanese voice actor
- Mitsuaki Nakamoto (中本 満明; born 1954), Japanese handball player
- Mitsuaki Sato (佐藤 満明; born 1968), Japanese basketball player and women's basketball coach
- Mitsuaki Shiga (志賀 光明; born 1991), Japanese water polo player
- Mitsuaki Yoshida (吉田 光昭; born 1939), Japanese virologist

== Fictional characters ==
• Mitsuaki Takeda (武田 光秋) a character in the film Godzilla, Mothra and King Ghidorah: Giant Monsters All-Out Attack
