= CB Alicante =

Spanish handball club

Calpisa
- Full name: Club Balonmano Alicante
- Founded: 1945
- Dissolved: 1993
- Arena: Pitiu Rochel, Alicante, Spain
- Capacity: 1,868
- League: Liga ASOBAL
- 1992–93: Liga ASOBAL, 6th
Home	Away

Club Balonmano Alicante or Club Balonmano Calpisa was a Spanish handball team based in Alicante, Spain, that dominated the Spanish league along four years and reached four championships and three Spanish cups.

Most of their players joined the national side of Spain and sometimes there were 6 or 7 Calpisa members playing with Spain.

== Club's name ==
Name	Gap	Total seasons
C.D. Obras del Puerto	1954–1972	18
Obras del Puerto Calpisa	1972–1974	2
C.B. Calpisa	1974–1981	7
C.B. Calpisa-Hércules	1981–1982	1
C.B. Tecnisa	1982–1985	3
C.B. Tecnisán	1985–1988	3
C.B. Helados Alacant	1988–1992	4
C.B. Alicante-Benidorm	1992–1993	1

== Trophies ==
- División de Honor: 4
  - Winners: 1974–75, 1975–76, 1976–77, 1977–78
  - Runners-Up: 1978–79, 1979–80
- Copa del Rey (Spanish cup): 5
  - Winners: 1974–75,1975–76,1976–77,1979–80, (CB Tecnisán) 1985–86
  - Runners-Up: 1978–79
- EHF Champions League:
  - Semi-Final 77–78 Lost in semifinal against Śląsk Wrocław.
- EHF Cup Winners' Cup: 1
  - Winners: 1979–80
- EHF Cup:
  - Runners-Up: (CB Tecnisa) 1985–86
- Double

Winners (3): 1974–75, 1975–76, 1976–77

== Notable players ==
- (Spain) José Perramón
- (Spain) Pitiu Rochel
- (Spain) Gregorio López
- (Spain) Melo
- (Spain) Ignacio Novoa
- (Spain) Víctor García
- (Spain) de Miguel
- (Spain) Mario Hernández
- (Spain) Santos Labaca
- (Spain) Javier Cabanas
- (Spain) Josep Maria Masip
- (Spain) Miguel Ángel Cascallana
- (Croatia) Nikola Miloš
- (Denmark) Jørgen Gluver
- (Norway) Kaare Rankeliv
- (Soviet Union) Serguei Stupka
- (Socialist Federal Republic of Yugoslavia) Pero Milošević
- (Socialist Federal Republic of Yugoslavia) Radivoje Krivokapić
- (Socialist Federal Republic of Yugoslavia) Ivo Munitić
- (Socialist Federal Republic of Yugoslavia) Časlav Grubić
- (Socialist Federal Republic of Yugoslavia) Božidar Gašpar
- (Socialist Federal Republic of Yugoslavia) Dragan Radovanović
- (Socialist Federal Republic of Yugoslavia) Vjekoslav Mitrović
- (Socialist Federal Republic of Yugoslavia) Stojan Šumej

== Notables coaches ==
- Miguel Roca Mas
- Pitiu Rochel
- José Julio Espina
- Santos Labaca
- César Argilés Blasco
- (Socialist Federal Republic of Yugoslavia) Ivo Munitić
