= Jan-Olaf Immel =

German handball player (born 1976)

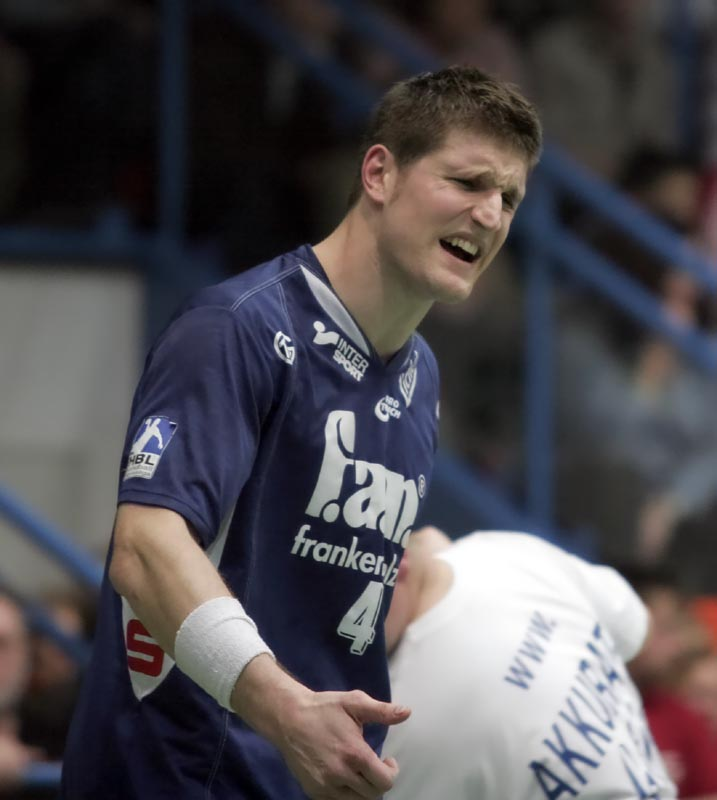

Personal information
- Nationality: German
- Born: 14 March 1976 (age 50) Wiesbaden, East Germany
- Height: 2.02 m (6 ft 8 in)

Sport
- Sport: Handball
- Position: Left back

Youth career
- Years: Team
- –: TuS Dotzheim

Senior clubs
- Years: Team
- –: TuS Dotzheim
- -2005: SG Wallau-Massenheim
- 2005-2007: TV Großwallstadt
- 2007-2009: TSG Münster
- 2009-2010: HSG FrankfurtRheinMain
- 2010-2011: DHC Rheinland
National team
Years	Team	Apps	(Gls)
1999-??	Germany	105	(151)

Teams managed
- 2008-2009: TSG Münster
- 2009-2010: HSG FrankfurtRheinMain
- 2013-: TSG Eppstein
Medal record
Olympic Games
Silver medal – second place	2004 Athens	Team Competition
World Men's Handball Championship
Silver medal – second place	2003 Portugal	Team competition
European Championship
Gold medal – first place	2004 Slovenia	Team competition

Jan Olaf Immel (born 14 March 1976) is a former German team handball player. He received a silver medal at the 2004 Summer Olympics in Athens with the German national team. His team won the 2004 European Men's Handball Championship in Slovenia.

He debuted for the German national team in May 1999 against Belgium.

He missed the 2007 World Championship, where Germany won gold, due to a shoulder operation.

In 2007 he joined the second tier team TSG Münster, where he became a player-coach. After the fusion with SG Wallau-Massenheim, where the club became HSG FrankfurtRheinMain, he continued in this function.

He retired in 2011.

In 2013 he became the coach of TSG Eppstein.
