= Ursula Hess =

Swiss archer (born 1946)

Ursula Hess (born 7 August 1946) is a former Swiss archer. She competed at the 1984 Summer Olympics representing Switzerland

== See also ==
- Switzerland at the 1984 Summer Olympics
