= Nóel Atli Arnórsson =

Icelandic footballer (born 2006)

Personal information
- Full name: Nóel Atli Arnórsson
- Date of birth: 30 September 2006 (age 20)
- Place of birth: Denmark
- Position: Centre-back

Team information
- Current team: AaB
- Number: 24

Youth career
- Aalborg KFUM
- AaB

Senior career*
Years	Team	Apps	(Gls)
2023–	AaB	52	(1)

International career^{‡}
2021	Iceland U-15	2	(0)
2022	Iceland U-16	3	(0)
2022–2023	Iceland U-17	6	(0)
2023	Iceland U-19	3	(0)
2024–	Iceland U-20	2	(0)
2025–	Iceland U-21	1	(0)
- * Club domestic league appearances and goals as of 2 June 2026 ‡ National team caps and goals as of 18:42, 19 June 2025 (UTC)

Nóel Atli Arnórsson (born 30 September 2006) is an Icelandic professional footballer who plays as a centre-back for Danish 1st Division club AaB.

== Career ==
Arnórsson joined AaB at the age of 11, moving from Aalborg KFUM. At AaB, Arnórsson worked his way up through the club's youth academy, and in August 2023 made his first-team debut when he was substituted in a Danish Cup match against Egen UI. He became the 11th youngest player to make his debut for AaB's first team when he was just 16 years and 319 days old. The following month he made another appearance in a cup match.

On 11 October 2023, Arnórsson signed a new contract with AaB until the end of 2026. On 10 March 2024, Arnórsson made his league debut in the Danish 1st Division when he was in the starting lineup against Vendsyssel FF. Young Arnórsson finished the season with eight league games and two cup games for AaB's first team.

Ahead of the 2024–25 season, Arnórsson was permanently promoted to the first team squad. Davidsen made his Danish Superliga debut on 19 July 2024, where he was in the starting lineup in the season opener against FC Nordsjælland.

In September 2024 Arnórsson was injured in a match against Randers FC. He was back again in late October, playing matches for the U-19 team, but in November he was injured again during a U-19 match, which would keep him out for the rest of the year.

== Personal life ==
Nóel Atli Arnórsson is the son of former Icelandic handball player Arnór Atlason, who had a career as a player for the Icelandic national team and as a player and assistant coach for Aalborg Håndbold. Nóel is the grandson of former Icelandic handball player Atli Hilmarsson.
