= Marc Wiltberger =

French handball player (born 1969)

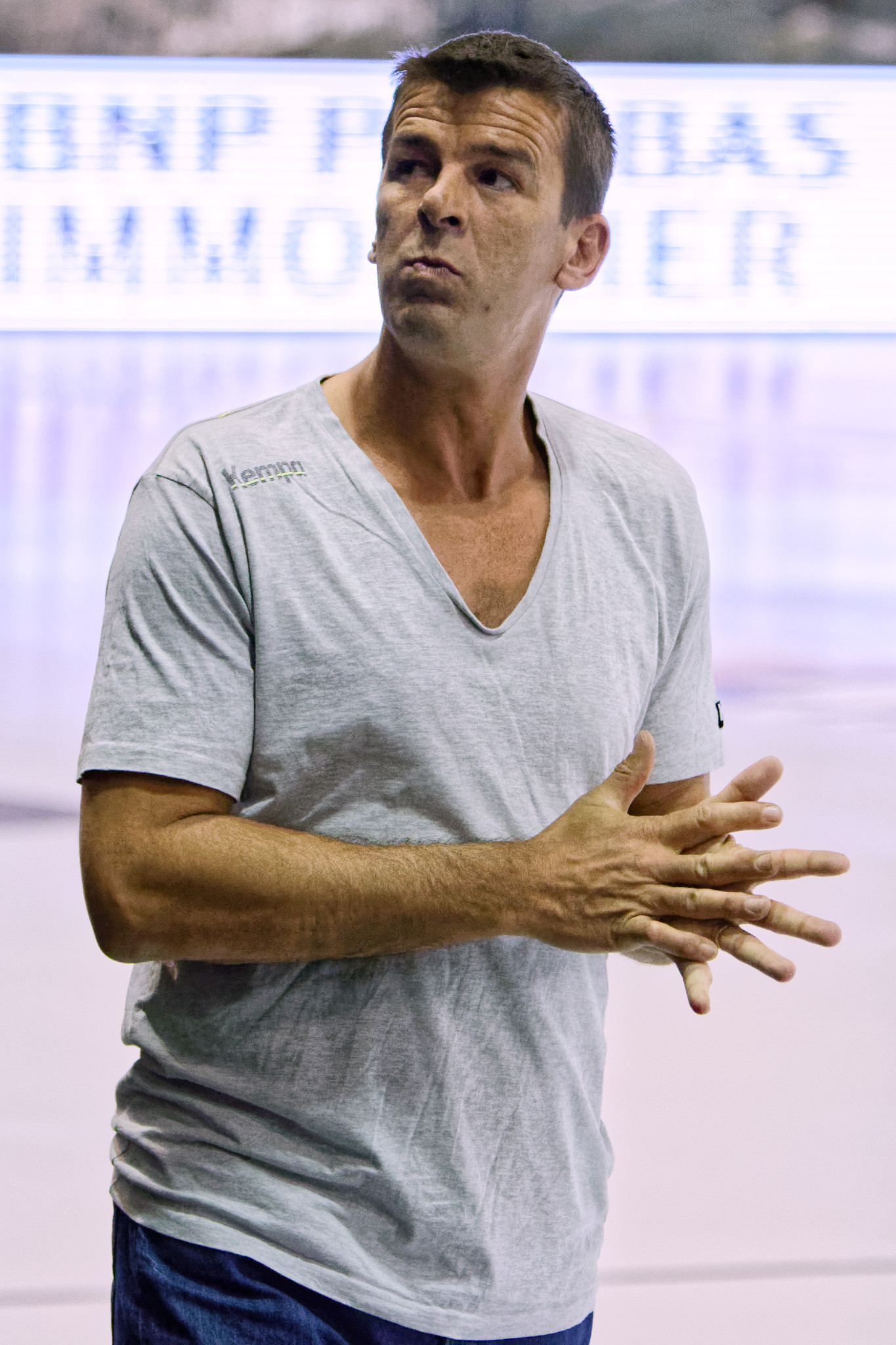
- Marc Wiltberger (2015)

Personal information
- Nationality: French
- Born: 19 July 1961 (age 65) Strassbourg, France
- Height: 1.93 m (6 ft 4 in)

Sport
- Sport: Handball
- Position: Centerback

Youth career
- Years: Team
- –: Racing Club de Strasbourg

Senior clubs
- Years: Team
- 1978-1989: Racing Club de Strasbourg
- 1989-1993: Girondins de Bordeaux HBC
- 1993-1996: Montpellier AHB
- 1996-1999: SG Wallau-Massenheim (Germany)
- 1999-2001: SC Sélestat
- 2001-2004: Chambéry Savoie HB
National team
Years	Team	Apps	(Gls)
1991-2000	France	148	(241)

Teams managed
- 2014-2015: Pays d'Aix Université Club (assistent)
- 2015: Pays d'Aix Université Club
Medal record
World Championship
Bronze medal – third place	1997 Japan

Marc Wiltberger (born 1969) is a French team handball coach and former player.

== Career ==
Wiltberger started his handball career at his hometown club Racing Club de Strasbourg. In 1989 he joined Girondins de Bordeaux HBC, where he won the 1990 Coupe de France. After 4 years he joined Montpellier AHB, where he won the French Championship in 1995. In the 1991-92 season he was top scorer in the French league.

In 1996 he joined German Bundesliga team SG Wallau-Massenheim. In 1999 he returned to France to join SC Sélestat. From 2001 until his retirement in 2004 he played for Chambéry Savoie HB. Here he won the French League Cup in 2002 and came second in the French league in 2002 and 2003.

At the 1997 World Championship Japan he won bronze medals with the French team. He also competed at the 2000 Summer Olympics in Sydney, where the French team placed sixth.

In the 2014-15 season he was the assistent coach at Pays d'Aix Université Club. When head coach Zvonimir Serdarušić left the club at the end of the season Wiltberger took over as interim coach until November 2015.

In January 1996 he was temporarily excluded from handball along with 5 other French players for the consumption of Marihuana.
