= Pär Jilsén =

Swedish handball player (born 1960)

Personal information
- Nationality: Sweden
- Born: 12 January 1960 (age 66) Krylbo, Sweden
- Height: 188 cm (74 in)

Sport
- Sport: Handball
- Position: Wing

Youth career
- Years: Team
- –: Irsta HF

Senior clubs
- Years: Team
- –1981: Irsta HF
- 1981–1984: IK Heim
- 1984–1991: Redbergslids IK
National team
Years	Team	Apps
1983–1991	Sweden	96

Teams managed
- –: Önnereds HK
- –: IK Sävehof women's team (assistant)
- 2004–2005: Sweden U21
Medal record
World Championship
Gold medal – first place	1990 Czechoslovakia

Pär Jilsén (born 1 December 1960) is a Swedish former handball player and handball coach. He is the brother of fellow handball player Björn Jilsén, who he played with both with various clubs and on the national team. Pär Jilsén started playing handball at Irsta HF at the age of 7. He played in the club until aged 20, before moving to Gothenburg club IK Heim. In 1984 he moved to Redbergslids IK, where he played the rest of his career. In 1988 he was named Swedish Handballer of the Year.

He competed in the 1984 Summer Olympics and in the 1988 Summer Olympics together with his brother. He did however never play at a world cup.
