= Västra Frölunda IF Handball =

Swedish handball club

Västra Frölunda IF
- Full name: Västra Frölunda Idrottförening Handboll
- Founded: 1930
- Arena: Gothenburg, Sweden
| Home | Away |

Västra Frölunda IF Handball is Västra Frölunda IF's handball section, founded in 1930, the same year the main association was formed. The men's handball section has been successful, with 18 seasons in Elitserien.

== History ==
Västra Frölunda was promoted to the top division, at the time known as Allsvenskan, in 1954, but was immediately relegated. They were promoted again in 1970. In 1970–71 they finished third in the league and qualified for the playoffs. They won against IF Saab in the semifinals, but were defeated by SoIK Hellas in the finals. They finished second in the league in 1973–74, but lost against IF Saab in the semifinals. Västra Frölunda won the regular season in 1974–75. However, they were eliminated by HK Drott in the semifinals. Västra Frölunda were relegated in 1977 but were promoted again two years later. In 1981–82 they returned to the playoffs by finishing fourth in the league, but they were again eliminated by HK Drott in the semifinals. In the following season they finished fourth again, and reached their second final by winning against Ystads IF in the semifinals. In the finals they were defeated by cross-town rivals IK Heim. Västra Frölunda improved to second in the league in 1983–84, but lost the semifinals against HK Drott. In 1987–88 they finished 10th in the league and were relegated. They returned to the top division in 1994, but were immediately relegated. Västra Frölunda currently plays in Division 3, the fifth level.

== Notable players ==
- Per Öberg
- Lars Karlsson
