= Arnór Atlason =

Icelandic handball player (born 1984)

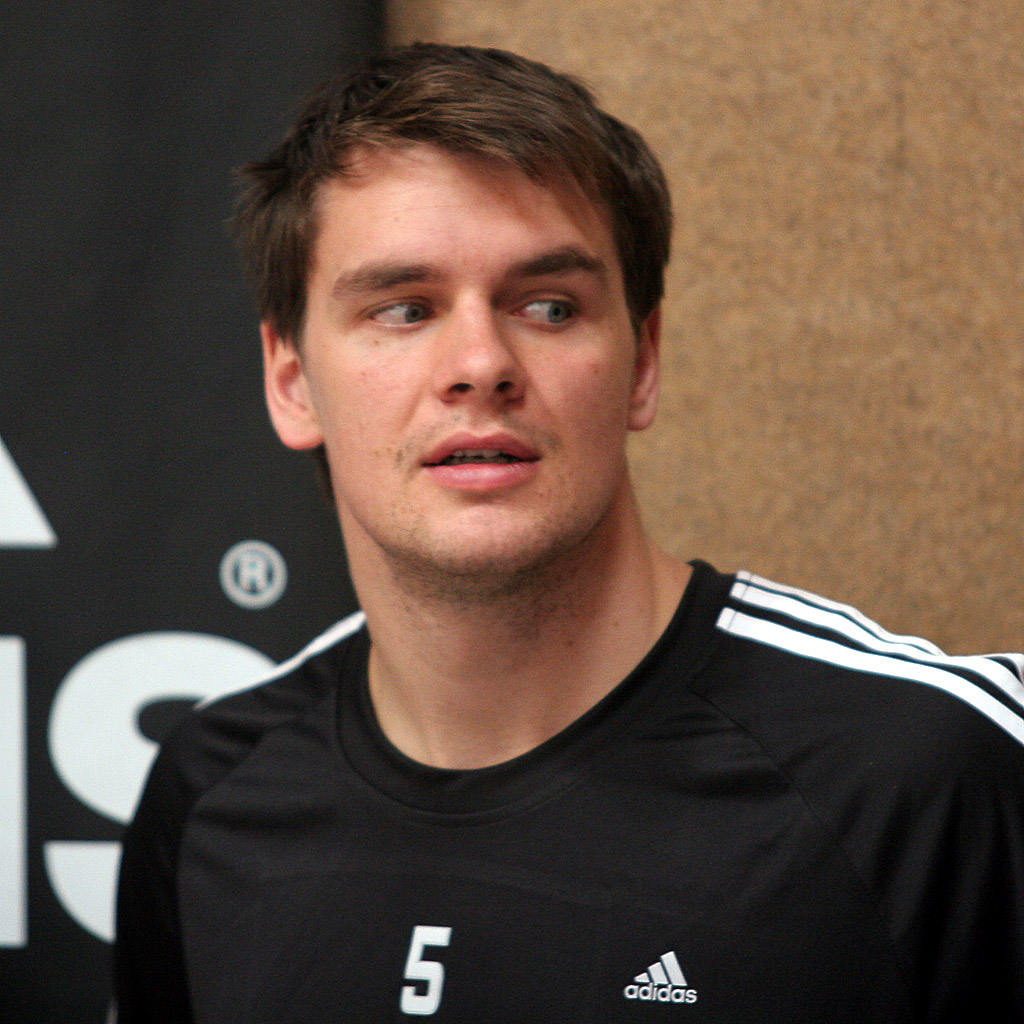

Personal information
- Nationality: Icelandic
- Born: 23 July 1984 (age 42) Akureyri, Iceland
- Height: 1.91 m (6 ft 3 in)

Sport
- Sport: Handball
- Position: Left back

Senior clubs
- Years: Team
- –2004: KA Akureyri
- 2004–2006: SC Magdeburg
- 2006–2010: FCK Håndbold
- 2010–2012: AG København
- 2012–2013: SG Flensburg-Handewitt
- 2013–2016: Saint-Raphaël Var Handball
- 2016–2018: Aalborg Håndbold
National team
Years	Team	Apps	(Gls)
–	Iceland	200	(427)

Teams managed
- 2018–2023: Aalborg Håndbold (assistant)
- 2023–: TTH Holstebro
- 2023–: Iceland (assistant)
Medal record
Olympic Games
Silver medal – second place	2008 Beijing	Team
European Championship
Bronze medal – third place	2010 Austria	Team

Arnór Atlason (born 23 July 1984) is an Icelandic retired handball player. He is the current head coach of TTH Holstebro, and assistant coach of the Iceland men's national handball team.

== Career ==
Arnór proved to be one of the best players in his position during the 2008 Olympics, scoring 4 goals against France in the final.

Arnór was the top scorer for Iceland and fourth overall in the 2010 Handball European Championship, with 39 goals out of 66 shots (59%), behind Nikola Karabatic who had 40 goals out of 73 shots (55%). He was also the highest assister with 27 assists out of 8 games, with Nikola Karabatić behind with 25, Ivano Balić and Filip Jícha tied third with 24, however Jícha played two matches less games.

Arnór also had the second highest goals plus assists, with 66 goals created in 8 matches, behind Jícha with 77 out of 6 matches.

Arnór has been regarded as one of the best assisters of his generation, being a key player for the Icelandic national team and AG Copenhagen, often keeping Mikkel Hansen out of his natural position.

=== Coaching Career ===
From 2018 to 2023 he was the assistant coach at Aalborg Håndbold. In 2023 he became the head coach of the Danish club TTH Holstebro and assistant coach on the Icelandic national team under Snorri Guðjónsson. In his first season in charge of TTH the team finished 11th in the Danish league.

In 2025 he was named Danish Men's Coach of the Year, after TTH had reached the semifinal of the 2024-25 Danish Championship. The following summer he extended his contract with TTH until 2028.

== Personal life ==
Arnór is the son of handballer Atli Hilmarsson who also played for Iceland in the Olympics. Arnór is the father of footballer Nóel Atli Arnórsson.
