= SG Wallau-Massenheim =

German handball club

- Full name: Spielgemeinschaft Wallau/Massenheim
- Founded: August 1, 1975; 50 years ago
- Arena: Sporthalle Wiesbaden am Elsässer Platz
- Capacity: 1500
- League: Bezirksliga
- Club colours
Home	Away

SG Wallau-Massenheim was a team handball club from Wallau (which belongs to Hofheim) east of Wiesbaden, Germany. It was a union of the two clubs TV Wallau and TuS Massenheim. Today they play in German lower leagues.

The club's biggest achievement is winning the German Championship twice; in 1992 and 1993 and the EHF Cup in 1992.

In the fall of 2004 the team began to lose sponsorships and the team had to declare bankruptcy in January 2005, as they could not pay a debt of 1.27 million euros. The team was refounded as HSG Breckenheim Wallau/Massenheim in the fourth tier, the Oberliga.

== Accomplishments ==
- Handball-Bundesliga:
  - 1992, 1993
- DHB-Pokal:
  - 1993, 1994
- DHB-Supercup:
  - 1994
- EHF Cup:
  - 1992
- EHF Champions League Finalists:
  - 1993
- Double

Winners (1): 1992–93

== Notable former players ==
- (Germany) Heiner Brand
- (Germany) Pascal Hens
- (Germany) Martin Schwalb
- (Germany) Jan-Olaf Immel
- (Germany) / (Belarus) Andrej Klimovets
- (Germany) Christian Zeitz
- (Germany) Peter Hofmann
- (Russia) Dmitri Torgovanov
- (Russia) Igor Lavrov
- (Denmark) Klavs Bruun Jørgensen
- (France) Frédéric Volle
- (France) Marc Wiltberger
- (Sweden) Björn Jilsén
