= Ingi Jónsson =

Icelandic swimmer

Personal information
- Nationality: Icelandic
- Born: 1 November 1962 (age 63)

Sport
- Sport: Swimming
- Strokes: freestyle, butterfly

Ingi Jónsson (born 1 November 1962) is an Icelandic butterfly and freestyle swimmer. He competed in three events at the 1984 Summer Olympics in Los Angeles, the Men's 100 metres Freestyle, Men's 200 metres Freestyle, and Men's 100 metres Butterfly, in which he placed 55th, 47th, and 43rd in, respectively.
