= Magnús Ólafsson (swimmer) =

Icelandic swimmer

Personal information
- Born: 16 September 1967 (age 58)

Sport
- Sport: Swimming

Magnús Ólafsson (born 16 September 1967) is an Icelandic freestyle swimmer. He competed in three events at the 1988 Summer Olympics.
