= Craig Gilbert =

American handball player (born 1956)

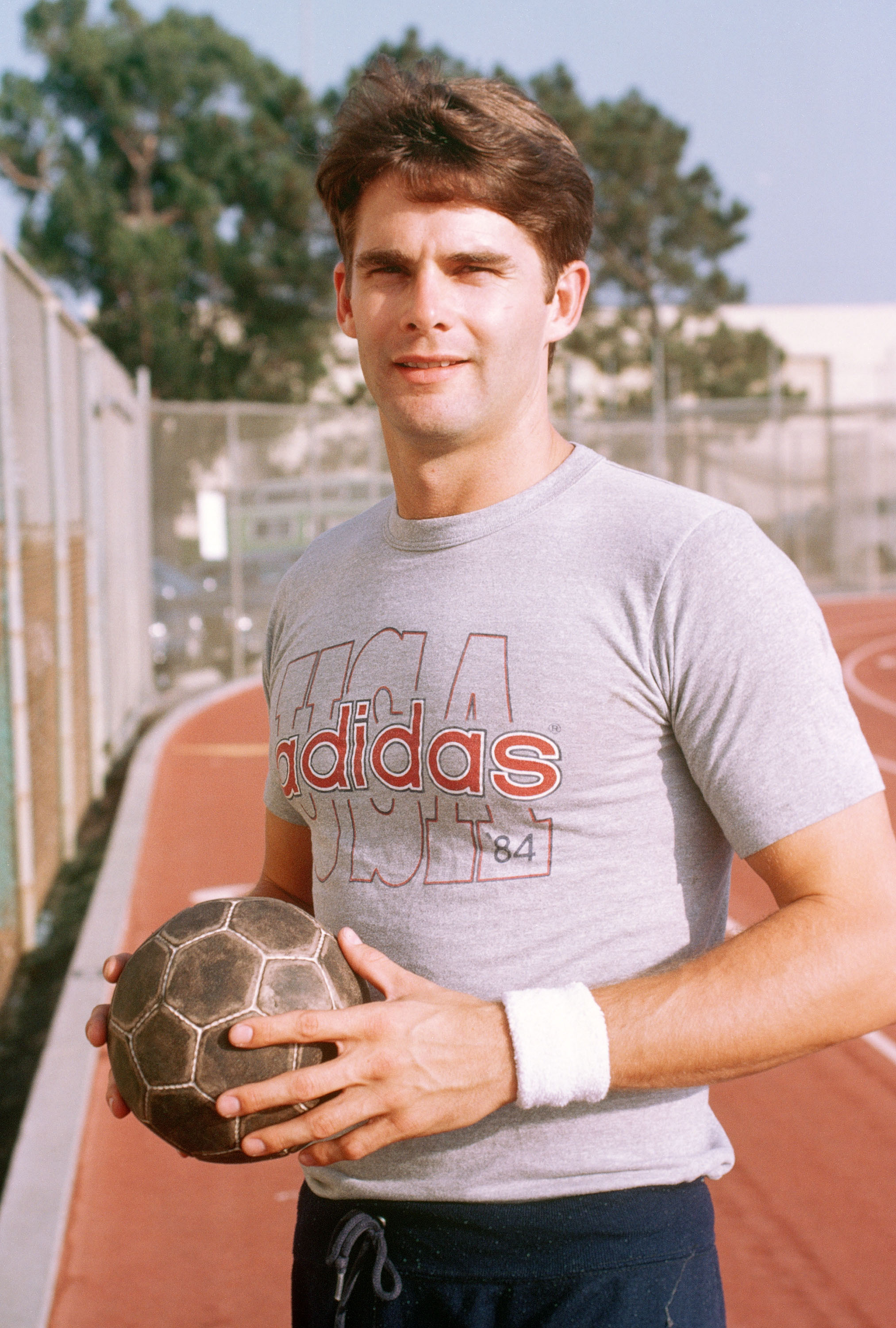
- Craig Gilbert at the 1984 Summer Olympics

Personal information
- Full name: Craig Thompson Gilbert
- Nationality: United States
- Born: November 1, 1956 (age 69) Buffalo, New York
- Height: 188 cm (6 ft 2 in)

Sport
- Sport: Handball

Youth career
- Years: Team
- 1975–1978: West Point Team Handball

Senior clubs
- Years: Team
- –: Jersey Jets
National team
- Years: Team
- 1978–84: United States
- Military career
- Allegiance: United States
- Branch: United States Army
- Service years: 1978–1986, 2004–2005
- Rank: Lieutenant colonel

Craig Gilbert (born November 1, 1956, in Buffalo, New York) is an American former handball player who competed in the 1984 Summer Olympics.

== Handball career ==
When he was at the United States Military Academy, he played for their handball team. He claimed the College Nationals twice.

At West Point, he also played football and basketball.

In 1978, he was elected in the national team.

At the 1984 Summer Olympic Games in Los Angeles, he and the team reached the 9th ranking. He played one game against Denmark.

== Military career ==
He graduated in 1978 with a mechanical engineering degree at the United States Military Academy.

He visited the Airborne School, Ranger School and the United States Army Command and General Staff College.

He served for 6.5 years in South Korea and afterwards he joined the United States Army Reserve.

Gilbert was a reserve liaison officer for 17 years and he recruited candidates for the United States Military Academy.

Between 2004 and 2005 he served in Afghanistan at the Operation Enduring Freedom for this he was promoted to lieutenant colonel.

=== Awards and decorations ===
Ranger tab
Parachutist Badge

== Academic ==
Additionally to his time at West Point he also did a master's degree in Steven Institute of Technology and Rutgers University.
