= Costica Neagu =

Romanian handball player (born 1966)

Personal information
- Nationality: Romanian
- Born: 1 January 1966 (age 59)

Sport
- Sport: Handball

Costica Neagu (born 1 January 1966) is a Romanian handball player. He competed in the men's tournament at the 1992 Summer Olympics.
