= Andreas Neitzel =

German handball player (born 1964)

Personal information
- Nationality: East Germany
- Born: 14 February 1964 Berlin
- Height: 186 cm (73 in)

Sport
- Sport: Handball
National team
Years	Team	Apps	(Gls)
1988	East Germany	3	(4)
- Updated on only during the 1988 Summer Olympics

Andreas Neitzel (born 14 February 1964) is a former East German male handball player. He was a member of the East Germany national handball team. He was part of the East German team at the 1988 Summer Olympics.

He played his club handball at SC Dynamo Berlin, followed by VfL Fredenbeck and TV Schiffdorf.
