= Jesús Fernández (handballer, born 1962) =

Spanish handball player

Personal information
- Full name: Jesús Ángel Fernández
- Nationality: Spanish
- Born: 7 June 1962 (age 62)

Sport
- Sport: Handball

Jesús Ángel Fernández (born 7 June 1962) is a Spanish handball player. He competed in the men's tournament at the 1988 Summer Olympics.
