= Dano Halsall =

Swiss swimmer (born 1963)

Personal information
- Born: February 16, 1963 (age 63) Geneva, Switzerland
Medal record
Men's swimming
Representing Switzerland
World Championships (LC)
Silver medal – second place	1986 Madrid	50 m freestyle

Dano Halsall (born February 16, 1963) is a former freestyle swimmer from Switzerland, who competed in three Summer Olympics for his native country, starting in 1984.

Halsall was born in Geneva. His mother is Swiss and his father was born in Jamaica.

Halsall broke the world record in the 50m Freestyle on July 21, 1985. The next year he won the silver medal in the same event at the 1986 World Aquatics Championships in Madrid, Spain. He retired after the 1992 Summer Olympics in Barcelona, Spain.

Records
Preceded by Robin Leamy	Men's 50 metre freestyle world record holder (long course); July 21, 1985 – December 6, 1985	Succeeded by Tom Jager
