= Bernd Metzke =

German handball player (born 1966)

Personal information
- Nationality: East Germany
- Born: 25 June 1966 Belzig, Bezirk Potsdam, East Germany
- Height: 191 cm (75 in)

Sport
- Sport: Handball

Senior clubs
- Years: Team
- ?-?: ASK Vorwärts Frankfurt
National team
Years	Team	Apps
?-?	East Germany	4
- Updated on only during the 1988 Summer Olympics

Bernd Metzke (born 25 June 1966) is a former East German male handball player. He was a member of the East Germany national handball team. He was part of the team at the 1988 Summer Olympics. On club level he played for ASK Vorwärts Frankfurt in Frankfurt.
