= Santos Labaca =

Spanish handball player (born 1949)

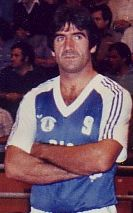

Santos Carlos Labaca Martínez (born November 1, 1949, in Pasajes, Gipuzkoa) is a Spanish former handball player who competed in the 1972 Summer Olympics.

In 1972, he was part of the Spanish team which finished fifteenth in the Olympic tournament. He played four matches and scored five goals.
