= Mike Fuhrig =

German handball player (born 1965)

Personal information
- Nationality: German
- Born: 17 April 1965 (age 61) Bad Schlema, Germany

Sport
- Sport: Handball

Mike Fuhrig (born 17 April 1965) is a German handball player. He competed in the men's tournament at the 1988 Summer Olympics.
