= José Novoa =

Spanish handball player (born 1955)

Personal information
- Full name: José Ignacio Novoa Behovide
- Born: December 20, 1955 (age 70); Irun, Guipúzcoa, Spain
- Playing position: Right wing

Senior clubs
- Years: Team
- 1970-1975: Bidasoa Irun
- 1975-1980: CB Calpisa
- 1980-1982: FC Barcelona Handbol
- 1982-1984: BM Granollers
- 1984-1986: CB Alicante
- 1986-1984: Tenerife Tres de Mayo
- 1987-1989: BM Valencia
- 1989-1990: CB Alzira
- 1990-1992: CB Helados Alacant

José Ignacio Novoa Behovide (Note: In this Spanish name, the first or paternal surname is Novoa and the second or maternal family name is Behovide.) (born December 20, 1955) is a Spanish former handball player who competed in the 1980 Summer Olympics and in the 1984 Summer Olympics.

In 1980 he was part of the Spanish team which finished fifth in the Olympic tournament. He played five matches and scored three goals.

Four years later he finished eighth with the Spanish team in the 1984 Olympic tournament. He played all six matches and scored seven goals.
