= Kang Duck-soo =

South Korean handball player (born 1959)

Personal information
- Nationality: South Korean
- Born: 30 January 1959 (age 67)

Sport
- Sport: Handball
Medal record
Asian Games
| Bronze medal – third place | 1982 Delhi | Team |

Kang Duck-soo (born 30 January 1959) is a South Korean handball player. He competed in the men's tournament at the 1984 Summer Olympics.
