= Jørgen Gluver =

Danish handball player (born 1960)

Jørgen Gluver (born 15 June 1960) is a Danish former handball player.

With Denmark, he finished fourth in the 1984 Olympic tournament. He played all six matches and scored nine goals. In total he played 88 games for the Danish national team scoring 135 goals.

He played his club handball with Rødovre HK (until 1984), HIK Håndbold (1984-1985) and in Denmark and CB Alicante in Spain (from 1985).
