= Lee Gwang-nam =

South Korean handball player (born 1966)

Personal information
- Nationality: South Korean
- Born: 14 March 1966 (age 59)

Sport
- Sport: Handball

Lee Gwang-nam (born 14 March 1966) is a South Korean handball player. He competed in the men's tournament at the 1984 Summer Olympics.
