= Tryggvi Helgason =

Icelandic swimmer

Personal information
- Born: 24 July 1963 (age 62)

Sport
- Sport: Swimming

Tryggvi Helgason (born 24 July 1963) is an Icelandic breaststroke swimmer. He competed in two events at the 1984 Summer Olympics.
