= Jozef Škandík =

Slovak handball player (born 1963)

Jozef Škandík (born 13 July 1963 in Bojnice) is a Slovak former handball player who competed in the 1988 Summer Olympics.
