= Guðrún Ágústsdóttir =

Icelandic swimmer

Personal information
- Born: 14 June 1967 (age 59)

Sport
- Sport: Swimming

Guðrún Fema Ágústsdóttir (born 14 June 1967) is an Icelandic former breaststroke swimmer. She competed in two events at the 1984 Summer Olympics.
