= Kang Tae-koo =

South Korean handball player (born 1961)

Personal information
- Nationality: South Korean
- Born: 25 January 1961 (age 65)

Sport
- Sport: Handball
Medal record
Asian Games
Bronze medal – third place	1982 Delhi	Team

Kang Tae-koo (born 25 January 1961) is a South Korean handball player. He competed in the men's tournament at the 1984 Summer Olympics.
