= Thierry Jacot =

Swiss swimmer

Personal information
- Born: 3 December 1961 (age 64)

Sport
- Sport: Swimming

Thierry Jacot (French: [tjɛʁi ʒako]; born 3 December 1961) is a Swiss freestyle swimmer. He competed in two events at the 1984 Summer Olympics.
