= Shim Jung-man =

South Korean handball player (born 1962)

Personal information
- Nationality: South Korean
- Born: 4 April 1962 (age 64)

Sport
- Sport: Handball
Medal record
Asian Games
Bronze medal – third place	1982 Delhi	Team

Shim Jung-man (born 4 April 1962) is a South Korean handball player. He competed in the men's tournament at the 1984 Summer Olympics.
