= Théophile David =

Swiss swimmer

Personal information
- Born: 15 December 1963 (age 62)

Sport
- Sport: Swimming

Théophile David (born 15 December 1963) is a Swiss butterfly swimmer. He competed at the 1984 Summer Olympics and the 1988 Summer Olympics.
