= Arnþór Ragnarsson =

Icelandic swimmer (born 1968)

Personal information
- Born: 31 January 1968 (age 58)

Sport
- Sport: Swimming

Arnþór Ragnarsson (born 31 January 1968) is an Icelandic breaststroke swimmer. He competed in two events at the 1988 Summer Olympics.
