= Aleix Franch =

Spanish handball player (born 1966)

Personal information
- Full name: Aleix Franch Alfos
- Nationality: Spanish
- Born: 29 September 1966 (age 58); Sabadell, Barcelona, Spain

Sport
- Sport: Handball

Aleix Franch Alfos (Note: In this Spanish name, the first or paternal surname is Franch and the second or maternal family name is Alfos.) (born 29 September 1966) is a Spanish handball player. He competed in the men's tournament at the 1992 Summer Olympics.
