= Kenzo Seki =

Japanese handball player (born 1955)

Kenzo Seki (関 健三, Seki Kenzō, born 24 January 1955) is a Japanese former handball player who competed in the 1984 Summer Olympics.
