= Eva Gysling =

Swiss swimmer

Personal information
- Born: 10 January 1967 (age 59)

Sport
- Sport: Swimming

Eva Gysling (born 10 January 1967) is a Swiss backstroke and freestyle swimmer. She competed at the 1984, 1988 and the 1992 Summer Olympics.
