= Yoshihiro Nikawadori =

Japanese handball player (born 1961)

Yoshihiro Nikawadori (荷川取義浩, Nikawadori Yoshihiro, born 4 December 1961) is a Japanese former handball player who competed in the 1988 Summer Olympics.
