= Ragnheiður Runólfsdóttir =

Icelandic swimmer

Personal information
- Born: 19 November 1966 (age 59)

Sport
- Sport: Swimming

Ragnheiður Runólfsdóttir (born 19 November 1966) is an Icelandic breaststroke and individual medley swimmer. She competed at the 1988 Summer Olympics and the 1992 Summer Olympics.

Ragnheiður was named Sportsperson of the Year in 1991, by which time she had already set around 200 Icelandic records in swimming events. She was the second woman to receive the title. During her career, Ragnheiður competed twice in the Olympic Games: she participated in the 1988 Games in Seoul, South Korea, and the 1992 Games in Barcelona, Spain, after which she ended her competitive career.
