= Choi Geun-nyeon =

South Korean handball player (born 1965)

Personal information
- Nationality: South Korean
- Born: 15 April 1965 (age 59)

Sport
- Sport: Handball

Choi Geun-nyeon (born 15 April 1965) is a South Korean handball player. He competed in the men's tournament at the 1984 Summer Olympics.
