= Pedro García (handballer) =

Spanish handball player (born 1963)

Personal information
- Nationality: Spanish
- Born: 17 February 1963 (age 62); Barcelona, Spain

Sport
- Sport: Handball

Pedro García (born 17 February 1963) is a Spanish handball player. He competed in the men's tournament at the 1984 Summer Olympics.
