= Park Byung-hong =

South Korean handball player (born 1963)

Personal information
- Nationality: South Korean
- Born: 20 June 1963 (age 63)

Sport
- Sport: Handball
Medal record
Asian Games
Bronze medal – third place	1982 Delhi	Team

Park Byung-hong (born 20 June 1963) is a South Korean handball player. He competed in the men's tournament at the 1984 Summer Olympics.
