= Kodo Yamamoto =

Japanese handball player (born 1961)

Kodo Yamamoto (山本 興道, Yamamoto Kōdō; born 8 February 1961) is a Japanese former handball player who competed in the 1988 Summer Olympics.
