= Nobuo Sasaki =

Japanese handball player (born 1956)

Nobuo Sasaki (佐々木 信男, Sasaki Nobuo, born 22 March 1956) is a Japanese former handball player who competed in the 1984 Summer Olympics.
