= Johan Eklund (handballer) =

Swedish handball player (born 1964)

Personal information
- Full name: Johan Torsten Eklund
- Nationality: Swedish
- Born: 18 February 1964 (age 62) Stockholm, Sweden

Sport
- Sport: Handball
- Position: Line player
- Current club: Retired

Youth career
- Years: Team
- -1983: HK Cliff

Senior clubs
- Years: Team
- 1983-1984: HK Cliff
- 1984-1992: Redbergslids IK
National team
Years	Team	Apps	(Gls)
1985-1991	Sweden	23	(82)
Medal record
World Championship
Gold medal – first place	1990 Czechoslovakia

Johan Eklund (born 18 February 1964) is a Swedish former handball player and handball coach. He is a world champion from 1990, and he competed in the 1988 Summer Olympics.

== Club career ==
Eklund started his career at the Swedish club HK Cliff, where he won the Swedish junior championship in 1983. The year after, in 1984, he transferred to Redbergslids IK, where he won his first Swedish league in 1985. Here he started taking coaching courses in 1992.
