= Kamel Maoudj =

Algerian handball player (born 1969)

Personal information
- Nationality: Algerian
- Born: 30 August 1969 (age 55)

Sport
- Sport: Handball

Kamel Maoudj (born 30 August 1969) is an Algerian handball player. He competed in the men's tournament at the 1984 Summer Olympics.
