= Mats Lindau =

Swedish handball player (born 1958)

Mats Lindau (born 6 October 1958) is a Swedish former handball player who competed in the 1984 Summer Olympics.

In 1984 he finished fifth with the Swedish team in the Olympic tournament. He played all six matches and scored seven goals.
