= Krylbo =

Urban area in Avesta, Sweden

Coordinates: 60.12978°N 16.21378°E

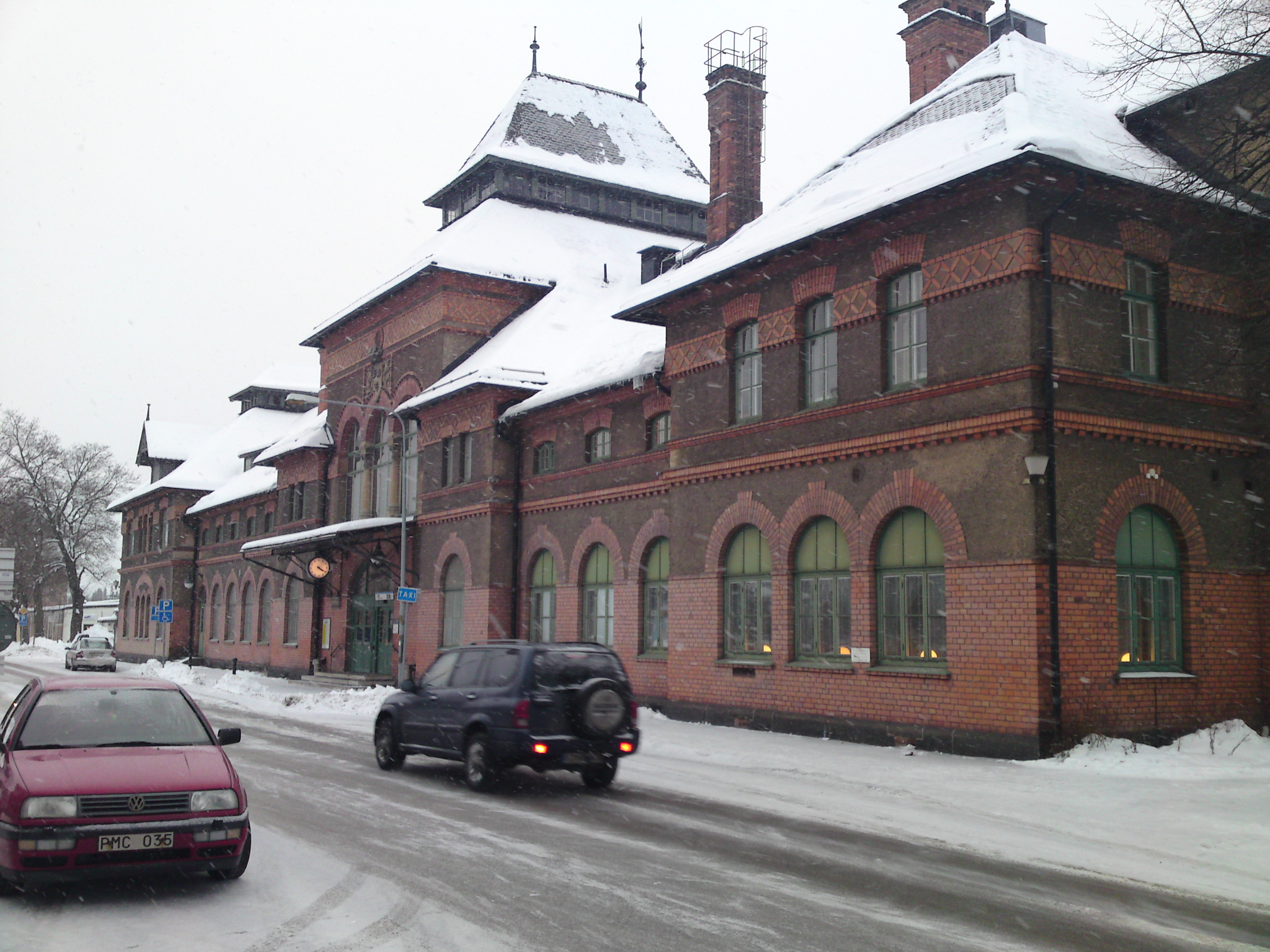
Avesta Krylbo railroad station in February 2009

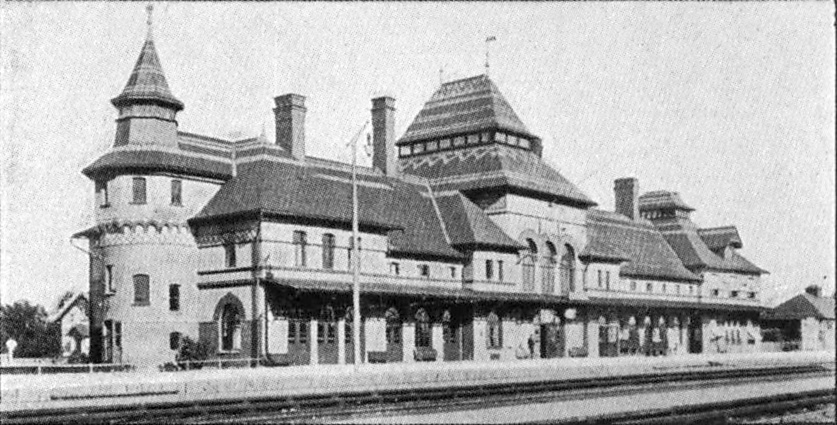
The railroad station around 1910

Krylbo (Swedish pronunciation: [ˈkry̌ːlbʊ]) is a part of the Swedish town Avesta in Avesta Municipality, Dalarna County. It was a market town until it merged with the city of Avesta in 1966.

Krylbo is mostly known for being an important railway hub called Avesta-Krylbo. On July 19, 1941, a German train of five cars transporting ammunition exploded while standing at the Krylbo railway station. 24 people were injured.

Krylbo is the birthplace of legendary Detroit Red Wings defenceman Nicklas Lidström and athlete Henry Eriksson.
