= Martin Glaser =

Swiss handball player

Personal information
- Nationality: Swiss
- Born: 12 May 1962 (age 62)

Sport
- Sport: Handball

Martin Glaser (born 12 May 1962) is a Swiss handball player. He competed in the men's tournament at the 1984 Summer Olympics.
