= Azzedine Ouhib =

Algerian handball player (born 1956)

Personal information
- Nationality: Algerian
- Born: 15 November 1956 (age 68)

Sport
- Sport: Handball

Azzedine Ouhib (born 15 November 1956) is an Algerian handball player. He competed in the men's tournament at the 1984 Summer Olympics.
