= Rolf Hertzberg =

Swedish handball player (born 1959)

Rolf Hertzberg (born April 2, 1959) is a former Swedish handball player who competed in the 1984 Summer Olympics.

In 1984 he finished fifth with the Swedish team in the Olympic tournament. He played three matches as goalkeeper.
