= Þorbergur Aðalsteinsson =

Icelandic handball player (born 1956)

Personal information
- Nationality: Icelandic
- Born: 16 May 1956 (age 70)
- Height: 190 cm (75 in)

Sport
- Sport: Handball
- Current club: Retired
National team
Years	Team	Apps	(Gls)
–	Iceland	148	(369)

Teams managed
- Years: Team
- 1990–1995: Iceland

Þorbergur Aðalsteinsson (born 16 May 1956) is an Icelandic former handball player who competed in the 1984 Summer Olympics.

He then have been coach of the Iceland men's national handball team from 1990 to 1995
