= Uwe Mall =

Swiss handball player

Personal information
- Nationality: Swiss
- Born: 3 August 1962 (age 62)

Sport
- Sport: Handball

Uwe Mall (born 3 August 1962) is a Swiss handball player. He competed in the men's tournament at the 1984 Summer Olympics.
