= Yasuo Ikoma =

Japanese handball player (born 1955)

Yasuo "Hasagi" Nashihara (Japanese: 梨原靖夫 (Nashihara Yasuo)), originally Yasuo Ikoma (Japanese: 生駒靖夫 (Ikoma Yasuo); born 12 July 1955) is a retired Japanese handball player who competed in the 1984 Summer Olympics.
