= Claes Hellgren =

Swedish handball player (born 1955)

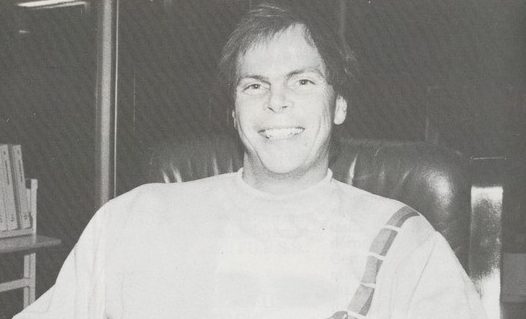
- Claes Hellgren in 1988.

Personal information
- Full name: Claes Göran Vilhelm Hellgren
- Nationality: Sweden
- Born: 27 February 1955 (age 71) Norrköping, Sweden

Sport
- Sport: Handball
- Position: Goalkeeper

Senior clubs
- Years: Team
- 1972–1974: Irsta HF
- 1974–1978: IF Guif
- 1978–1983: IK Heim
- 1983–1985: Coronas Tres de Mayo
- 1985–1986: HP Warta
- 1987–1990: Irsta HF
- 1990–1991: Stavanger IF
- 1990–1991: Sushi Masters
National team
Years	Team	Apps	(Gls)
1976–1988	Sweden	214	(3)

Teams managed
- 1986–1987: United States (women)
- 1987–1990: Irsta HF
- 1988–1989: Sweden U21
- 1990–1992: Stavanger IF
- 1992–1994: Irsta HF
- 1994–1996: United States (men and women)
- 1996–1999: Sweden (women)
- 1999–2001: IF Guif

Claes Hellgren (born 27 February 1955) is a Swedish former handball player who played as goalkeeper, sports commentator and handball coach. In 1979 he was named Swedish Handballer of the Year.

== Club career ==
Hellgren started playing for the Irsta HF first team in the Division 3, the third tier in the 1972–73 season. After two seasons he moved to IF Guif, where in his first season was promoted to the Swedish top flight. In the four seasons Hellgren spent at the club they ended in the playoff once, where they lost in the semi-final to SoIK Hellas.

Afterwards, he moved to IK Heim, where he reached playoffs in four out of five seasons with the club, and became Swedish champions in 1982 and 1983. They also reached the semi-final of the Cup Winners' Cup in 1978/80 where they lost to CB Calpisa Alicante.

In the 1983 summer, he, together with Björn Jilsén, became the two first Swedish players to join a foreign club, when they moved to Tenerife to join Coronas Tres de Mayo, a relatively newly created club that was about to play its first season in the top flight. They finished 6th and Hellgren was awarded with the player of the season award.

After two seasons in Spain, he returned to Sweden and joined the team HP Warta, with which he reached the semi-final of the 1986 championship playoffs. In the 1986–87 season, the active career was put on a burner, to go into coaching where he was coaching the USA women's team.

From 1987 to 1990 he became the player-coach og his former club Irsta HF. In his third season at the club, they managed to be promoted to the top league. In the first season in the top flight, they managed to finish 4th.

In the last years of his active career, he played as a player coach for Norwegian side Stavanger IF.

In both 1984 and in 1985 he won the award for world's best goalkeeper.

== International career ==
Hellgren debuted in a 19–16 win against Switzerland on 10 September 1976. He played for the national team for 12 years, where he competed in the 1984 Summer Olympics and in the 1988 Summer Olympics. He also participated in the World Championship 3 times; in 1978, 1982 and 1986.

For a long time he held the record for most caps for the Swedish national team, but was eventually overtaken, and he was the first Swedish player to achieve 200 international matches.

== Coaching career ==
Hellgren had slowly become a more classical coach when he played less and less for Stavanger IF. He took over the USA women's team. In his first tournament, the Pan American Games, he managed to win the tournament. He took over his former club Irsta IF, where he didn't manage to bring them to the play-offs.

Between 1994 and 1996 Hellgren was the coach of both the US men's and women's teams. This was in the lead-up to Atlanta 1996. At the 1995 women's World cup, the United States ended at 17th out of 20. At the Olympics games the team would finish last out of 8 participants. On the men's side, he would lead them to a 17th place out of 20 and at the Olympics a 9th out of 12th.

Afterwards, he took over the Swedish women's team between 1996 and 1999. At the European Women's Handball Championship he finished 8th out of 12, but fail to qualify for the World Championship in both 1997 and 1999.

In 1998 he returned to club handball and became the coach of IF Guif. They gained promotion to the top flight in 1999, and the season after they were in the playoffs as a newly promoted team. After his tenure at IF Guif, he focused specifically on goalkeeper coaching at various clubs and national teams, and on individual coaching.

Additionally Hellgren has worked sa a teacher in maths, biology and P.E. From 2014 to 2017, he was fitness coach for Hammarby Fotboll.

== Personal life ==
Hellgren was born in Norrköping to Anna-Carin and Swedish swimmer Rune Hellgren.
