= Jens Einarsson =

Icelandic handball player (born 1954)

Personal information
- Full name: Jens Guðjón Einarsson
- Nationality: Icelandic
- Born: 27 December 1954 (age 71)
- Height: 1.83 m (6 ft 0 in)

Sport
- Sport: Handball
National team
Years	Team	Apps	(Gls)
–	Iceland	61	(0)

Jens Einarsson (born 27 December 1954) is an Icelandic former handball player who competed in the 1984 Summer Olympics.
