= Lim Young-chul =

South Korean handball player (born 1960)

- Hangul: 임영철
- Hanja: 林英喆
- RR: Im Yeongcheol
- MR: Im Yŏngch'ŏl

Lim Young-chul, also written Im Yeong-cheol (born 15 June 1960) is a South Korean handball player and coach.

As a player, he won a bronze medal at the 1982 Asian Games in New Delhi and participated at the 1984 Summer Olympics with South Korean national team.

As a coach of the South Korea women's national team, he participated at three others editions of the Olympics (winning a silver medal in 2004, a bronze medal in 2008 and finishing 10th in 2016.), at many World Championships (as in 2013) and at many continental competitions (Asian Games and Asian Championships). He also managed many female clubs in Korea.
