= Felix Morf =

Swiss swimmer

Personal information
- Born: 5 January 1962 (age 64)

Sport
- Sport: Swimming

Felix Morf (born 5 January 1962) is a Swiss breaststroke swimmer. He competed in two events at the 1984 Summer Olympics.
