= Danny Sjöberg-Augustsson =

Swedish handball player (born 1958)

Danny Sjöberg-Augustsson (born 15 July 1958) is a former Swedish handball player who competed in the 1984 Summer Olympics.

In 1984 he finished fifth with the Swedish team in the Olympic tournament. He played five matches and scored ten goals.

In total he played 104 matches for the Sweden men's national handball team. At club level he played for Västra Frölunda IF.
