= Bjarni Guðmundsson =

Icelandic handball player (born 1957)

Personal information
- Full name: Bjarni Ólafur Guðmundsson
- Nationality: Icelandic
- Born: 5 January 1957 (age 69)
- Height: 1.81 m (5 ft 11 in)

Sport
- Sport: Handball
National team
| Years | Team | Apps | (Gls) |
| – | Iceland | 195 | (386) |

Bjarni Guðmundsson (born 5 January 1957) is an Icelandic former handball player who competed in the 1984 Summer Olympics.
