= Yukihiko Uemura =

Japanese handball player (born 1959)

Yukihiko Uemura (上村 幸彦, Uemura Yukihiko; born 27 February 1959) is a Japanese former handball player who competed in the 1984 Summer Olympics.
