= Þorbjörn Jensson =

Icelandic handball player

Personal information
- Nationality: Icelandic
- Born: 16 November 1967 (age 58) Iceland
- Height: 194 cm (76 in)

Sport
- Sport: Handball
National team
| Years | Team | Apps | (Gls) |
| – | Iceland | 160 | (104) |

Teams managed
- Years: Team
- 1995-2001: Iceland

Þorbjörn Jensson (born 7 September 1953) is an Icelandic former handball player who competed in the 1984 Summer Olympics.

He then have been coach of the Iceland men's national handball team from 1995 to 2001
