= Heinz Karrer =

Swiss handball player

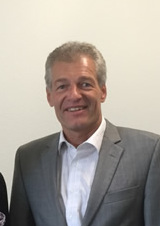
- Heinz Karrer in 2013

Personal information
- Nationality: Swiss
- Born: 10 May 1959 (age 65)

Sport
- Sport: Handball

Heinz Karrer (born 10 May 1959) is a Swiss handball player. He competed in the men's tournament at the 1984 Summer Olympics.
