= Roland Gassmann =

Swiss handball player

Personal information
- Nationality: Swiss
- Born: 31 March 1960 (age 64)

Sport
- Sport: Handball

Roland Gassmann (born 31 March 1960) is a Swiss handball player. He competed in the men's tournament at the 1984 Summer Olympics.
