= Katsutoshi Taguchi =

Japanese handball player (born 1961)

Katsutoshi Taguchi (田口 勝利, Taguchi Katsutoshi, born 30 October 1961) is a Japanese former handball player who competed in the 1984 Summer Olympics.
