= Koji Matsui (handballer) =

Japanese handball player (born 1957)

Koji Matsui (松井 幸嗣, Matsui Kōji; born 6 July 1957) is a Japanese former handball player who competed in the 1984 Summer Olympics.
