= Jürgen Bätschmann =

Swiss handball player (born 1957)

Personal information
- Nationality: Swiss
- Born: 29 September 1957 (age 67)

Sport
- Sport: Handball

Jürgen Bätschmann (born 29 September 1957) is a Swiss handball player. He competed in the men's tournament at the 1984 Summer Olympics.
