= Steinar Birgisson =

Icelandic handball player (born 1955)

Personal information
- Full name: Júlíus Steinar Birgisson
- Nationality: Icelandic
- Born: 25 May 1955 (age 71)
- Height: 187 cm (74 in)

Sport
- Sport: Handball
- Current club: Retired
National team
Years	Team	Apps	(Gls)
–	Iceland	91	(121)

Steinar Birgisson (born 25 May 1955) is an Icelandic former handball player who competed in the 1984 Summer Olympics.
