= Jesús Gómez (handballer) =

Spanish handball player (born 1965)

Personal information
- Nationality: Spanish
- Born: 17 April 1965 (age 61)

Sport
- Sport: Handball

Jesús Gómez (born 17 April 1965) is a Spanish handball player. He competed in the men's tournament at the 1988 Summer Olympics.
