= Lars-Erik Hansson =

Swedish handball player (born 1959)

Lars-Erik Hansson (born 16 June 1959) is a former Swedish handball player who competed in the 1984 Summer Olympics.

In 1984 he finished fifth with the Swedish team in the Olympic tournament. He played two matches and scored two goals.
