= Stephen Kirk =

American handball player

Personal information
- Full name: Stephen C. Kirk
- Nationality: United States
- Born: May 25, 1959 (age 67) Rockville Centre, New York

Sport
- Sport: Handball

Stephen C. Kirk (born May 25, 1959) is an American former handball player who competed in the 1984 Summer Olympics and in the 1988 Summer Olympics.

In high school he mainly played basketball.
