= Mitsuaki Nakamoto =

Japanese handball player (born 1954)

Mitsuaki Nakamoto (中本 満明, Nakamoto Mitsuaki, born 14 April 1954) is a Japanese former handball player who competed in the 1984 Summer Olympics.
