= Peter Olofsson =

Swedish handball player (born 1957)

Personal information
- Full name: Bengt Peter Olofsson
- Nationality: Sweden
- Born: 15 July 1957 (age 69) Uddevalla, Sweden
- Height: 203 cm (80 in)

Sport
- Sport: Handball

Senior clubs
- Years: Team
- –: HF Kroppskultur
National team
Years	Team	Apps	(Gls)
1975-1985	Sweden	96	(269)

Peter Olofsson (born 15 June 1957) is a former Swedish handball player who played his entire career at HF Kroppskultur. He is one of the most scoring players of all time in the Swedish league and was the league top scorer in 1983/84 and in 1985/86 seasons. In 1984 he was named Swedish Handballer of the Year.

He competed in the 1984 Summer Olympics. In 1984 he finished fifth with the Swedish team in the Olympic tournament. He played all six matches and scored 19 goals. Due to injuries he never played at a world cup.

After his playing career he has been a youth coach at GF Kroppskultur.

His son Viktor Olofsson is also a handball player.
