= Shinji Yamamoto (handballer) =

Japanese handball player (born 1953)

Shinji Yamamoto (山本 伸二, Yamamoto Shinji; born 17 September 1953) is a Japanese former handball player who competed in the 1984 Summer Olympics.
