= Karl Þráinsson =

Icelandic handball player (born 1965)

Personal information
- Nationality: Icelandic
- Born: 10 August 1965 (age 61)
- Height: 183 cm (72 in)

Sport
- Sport: Handball
National team
| Years | Team | Apps | (Gls) |
| – | Iceland | 72 | (83) |
- Updated on 1. February 2023

Karl Þráinsson (born 10 August 1965) is an Icelandic former handball player who competed in the 1988 Summer Olympics.
