= Björn Jilsén =

Swedish handball player (born 1959)

Personal information
- Full name: Björn Erik Jilsén
- Nationality: Sweden
- Born: 8 January 1959 (age 67) Krylbo, Sweden
- Height: 193 cm (76 in)

Sport
- Sport: Handball
- Position: Left wing

Youth career
- Years: Team
- –: Irsta HF

Senior clubs
- Years: Team
- –1981: Irsta HF
- 1981–1983: IK Heim
- 1983–1984: Coronas Tres de Mayo
- 1984–1986: Redbergslids IK
- 1986–1987: SG Wallau-Massenheim
- 1987–1989: Redbergslids IK
- 1989–1992: RTV 1879 Basel
- 1992–1994: Irsta HF
National team
Years	Team	Apps	(Gls)
1982–1991	Sweden	189	(957)

Teams managed
- 1989–1992: RTV 1879 Basel
- 1992–1994: Irsta HF
- 1992–1994: SG Wallau-Massenheim
Medal record
World Championship
Gold medal – first place	1990 Czechoslovakia

Björn Erik Jilsén (born 8 January 1959 in Krylbo, Sweden) is a Swedish former handball player and handball coach. He was one of the best Swedish players in the 1980s and is recognised as one of the biggest names in Swedish handball of all time. In 1985 he was named Swedish Handballer of the Year. He has the best goals/games average of all time on the Swedish national team with 5.06 goals pr match.

His brother Pär Jilsén was also a handball player on the national team.

He was a part of the golden generation of the Swedish national team which started with the 1984 Summer Olympics. He also competed in the 1988 Summer Olympics. At the 1990 World Men's Handball Championship he became a world champion with the Swedish team.

At the end of his career he became a player-coach in Switzerland, Sweden and later Germany.
