= Per Öberg =

Swedish handball player (born 1962)

Per Öberg (born 3 June 1962) is a former Swedish handball player who competed in the 1984 Summer Olympics.

In 1984 he finished fifth with the Swedish team in the Olympic tournament. He played three matches and scored one goal.
