= Sten Sjögren =

Swedish handball player (born 1957)

Personal information
- Full name: Sten Hugo Sjögren
- Nationality: Sweden
- Born: 28 April 1957 (age 69) Lund, Sweden

Sport
- Sport: Handball
- Position: Right wing

Youth career
- Years: Team
- -1976: Lugi HF

Senior clubs
- Years: Team
- 1975-1994: Lugi HF
- 1994-1997: Skurups Handboll
National team
Years	Team	Apps	(Gls)
1978-1991	Sweden	200	(506)

Teams managed
- 1994-1997: Skurups Handboll
- 1997-1999: Olympic/Viking HK
- 1999-2002: Ystads IF
- 2002-2004: Lugi HF
- 2004-2006: Stavstens IF
Medal record
World Championship
Gold medal – first place	1990 Czechoslovakia

Sten Sjögren (born 28 April 1957 in Lund, Sweden) is a Swedish former handball player who played almost all his active years at Lugi HF.

Here he won the Swedish Championship in Allsvenskan i handboll för herrar 1979/1980, the first and until now only championship for the club. He held the record for most club appearances for the club until 2019, when he was overtaken by Anders Hallberg. He also has the record for most goals with the club, with 1,790 goals. He also had the record for most goals in the top Swedish division, with 1,534, until he was overtaken by Erik Hajas and later Zoran Roganović.

In 1983 he was named Swedish Handballer of the Year.

He stopped playing in Lugi HF in 1994 to become player-manager at Skurups Handboll in Skåne.

With Sweden he competed in the 1984 Summer Olympics and in the 1988 Summer Olympics. At the 1990 World Men's Handball Championship he became a world champion with the Swedish team.

After being the player-manager at Skurups Handboll he went on to coach several Swedish league teams, including his former club Lugi HF.
