= Kamel Ouchia =

Algerian handball player (born 1956)

Personal information
- Nationality: Algerian
- Born: 2 October 1956 (age 70)

Sport
- Sport: Handball
- Position: Goalkeeper
- Current club: Retired

Youth career
- Years: Team
- 1970–1972: CS DNC Alger
- 1974–1976: AS Finances

Senior clubs
- Years: Team
- 1976–??: (Algeria) Mouloudia Club d'Alger
National team
- Years: Team
- 1976–1988: Algeria

Kamel Ouchia (born 2 October 1956) is an Algerian handball player. He competed at the 1984 Summer Olympics and the 1988 Summer Olympics.
