= Kristján Arason =

Icelandic handball player (born 1961)

Personal information
- Nationality: Icelandic
- Born: 23 July 1961 (age 65)
- Height: 1.94 m (6 ft 4 in)

Sport
- Sport: Handball
- Position: Right back

Senior clubs
- Years: Team
- –1985: FH
- 1985–1986: VfL Hameln
- 1986–1988: VfL Gummersbach
- 1988–1991: Teka Santander
- 1991–1994: FH
National team
Years	Team	Apps	(Gls)
–	Iceland	245	(1123)

Teams managed
- 1991–1994: FH
- 1994–1996: TSV Bayer Dormagen
- 1996–1997: SG Wallau-Massenheim
- 2010–2012: FH

Kristján Arason (born 23 July 1961) is a former member of Icelandic national handball team. He is the husband of Þorgerður Katrín Gunnarsdóttir, a well-known figure in Icelandic politics. He ranked fourth in IHF's list of the world's best handball players in the year 1989. He won the Icelandic championship with Fimleikafélag Hafnarfjarðar (FH) as a coach in 2011.

== Basketball ==
Before fully focusing on handball, Kristján played various other sports, including basketball. He was a member of the Iceland junior national basketball teams and won the 2. deild karla with Haukar in 1981.

== See also ==
- List of men's handballers with 1000 or more international goals
