= Abdel Salem Ben Magh Soula =

Algerian handball player (born 1961)

Personal information
- Nationality: Algerian
- Born: 20 February 1961 (age 65)

Sport
- Sport: Handball

Achievements and titles
- Olympic finals: 1984 Summer Olympics; 1988 Summer Olympics

Abdel Salem Ben Magh Soula ou Abdeslam Benmaghsoula (born 20 February 1961) is an Algerian handball player. He competed at the 1984 Summer Olympics and the 1988 Summer Olympics.
