= Brahim Boudrali =

Algerian handball player (born 1963)

Personal information
- Nationality: Algerian
- Born: 12 February 1963 (age 63)
- Height: 186 cm (73 in)

Sport
- Sport: Handball

Senior clubs
- Years: Team
- –: SR Annaba
- 1983–1996: MC Alger
- –: Al Ahli SC
National team
- Years: Team
- 1983–1996: Algeria

Teams managed
- 1998–1999: Algeria
- 2001–2003: Algeria
- 2006–2007: Al Ahli SC (Doha)
- 2007–2008: Al-Wakrah SC
- 2008–2011: Al-Ahli Saudi FC
- 2011–2013: Oman
- 2013–2015: Lekhwiya SC
- 2017–?: Al-Ahli Saudi FC
- 2021–?: Al-Khor SC
- 2024–?: Oman Club

Brahim Boudrali (born 12 February 1963) is an Algerian handball player and coach. He competed at the 1984 Summer Olympics and the 1988 Summer Olympics.
