= Abu Sofiane Draouci =

Algerian handball player (born 1960)

Personal information
- Nationality: Algerian
- Born: 22 April 1960 (age 66)

Sport
- Sport: Handball

Abu Sofiane Draouci (born 22 April 1960) is an Algerian handball player. He competed at the 1984 Summer Olympics and the 1988 Summer Olympics.
