= Atli Hilmarsson =

Icelandic handball player (born 1959)

Personal information
- Nationality: Icelandic
- Born: 23 December 1959 (age 66)
- Height: 192 cm (76 in)

Sport
- Sport: Handball
- Current club: Retired
National team
Years	Team	Apps	(Gls)
–	Iceland	134	(391)

Atli Hilmarsson (born 23 December 1959) is an Icelandic former handball player who competed in the 1984 Summer Olympics and in the 1988 Summer Olympics.

Atli is the father of handballer Arnór Atlason who also played for Iceland in the Olympics. Atli is the grandfather of footballer Nóel Atli Arnórsson.
