= Sigurður Sveinsson =

Icelandic handball player (born 1959)

Personal information
- Full name: Sigurður Valur Sveinsson
- Nationality: Icelandic
- Born: 5 March 1959 (age 67)
- Height: 192 cm (76 in)

Sport
- Sport: Handball
National team
Years	Team	Apps	(Gls)
–	Iceland	242	(736)

Sigurður Valur Sveinsson (born 5 March 1959) is an Icelandic former handball player who competed in the 1984 Summer Olympics and in the 1988 Summer Olympics.

He played for the German clubs TuS Nettelstedt and TBV Lemgo in the Bundesliga, and OSC Dortmund in the 2. Bundesliga. In the 1984/85 season with TBV Lemgo he was the Bundesliga top scorer with 191 goals, and in 1989/90 he was the top scorer in the 2. Bundesliga with OSC Dortmund. In the 1990/91 season he played for Atlético Madrid in Spain.
