= Einar Þorvarðarson =

Icelandic handball player (born 1957)

Personal information
- Nationality: Icelandic
- Born: 12 August 1957 (age 69)
- Height: 1.93 m (6 ft 4 in)

Sport
- Sport: Handball
- Position: Goalkeeper

Senior clubs
- Years: Team
- –: HK Kópavogur
- –: Valur Reykjavík
- 1985–1987: Coronas Tres de Mayo
- 1987–1990: Valur Reykjavík
National team
Years	Team	Apps	(Gls)
–	Iceland	223	(0)

Teams managed
- 1991-1994: UMF Selfoss
- Updated on 26 January 2018

Einar Þorvarðarson (born 12 August 1957) is an Icelandic former handball player and handball coach. He competed in the 1984 Summer Olympics and in the 1988 Summer Olympics.

When he ended his playing career he became the coach of Icelandic side UMF Selfoss.
