= Sigurður Gunnarsson =

Icelandic handball player (born 1959)

Personal information
- Nationality: Icelandic
- Born: 11 September 1959 (age 67) Iceland

Sport
- Sport: Handball

Senior clubs
- Years: Team
- –: Víkingur
- 1981-1982: Bayer Leverkusen
- –: Víkingur
- 1984-1987: Coronas 3 De Mayo
National team
Years	Team	Apps	(Gls)
–	Iceland	202	(493)

Sigurður Gunnarsson (born 11 September 1959) is an Icelandic former handball player who competed in the 1984 and in the 1988 Summer Olympics.

Gunnarsson was also a prolific Soccer player and featured in the Icelandic youth national teams before committing to the handball.
