= Þorgils Mathiesen =

Icelandic handball player

Personal information
- Full name: Þorgils Óttar Mathiesen
- Nationality: Icelandic
- Born: 17 May 1962 (age 64)
- Height: 188 cm (74 in)

Sport
- Sport: Handball
- Current club: Retired
National team
| Years | Team | Apps | (Gls) |
| – | Iceland | 247 | (575) |

Þorgils Óttar Mathiesen (born 17 May 1962) is an Icelandic former handball player who competed in the 1984 Summer Olympics and in the 1988 Summer Olympics.
