= Brynjar Kvaran =

Icelandic handball player (born 1958)

Personal information
- Nationality: Icelandic
- Born: 16 January 1958 (age 68)
- Height: 186 cm (73 in)

Sport
- Sport: Handball
- Position: Goalkeeper
- Current club: Retired
National team
Years	Team	Apps	(Gls)
–	Iceland	116	(0)

Brynjar Kvaran (born 16 January 1958) is an Icelandic former handball player who competed in the 1984 Summer Olympics and in the 1988 Summer Olympics.
