= Jakob Sigurðsson =

Icelandic handball player (born 1964)

Personal information
- Nationality: Icelandic
- Born: 28 March 1964 (age 62)
- Height: 181 cm (71 in)

Sport
- Sport: Handball
- Current club: Retired
National team
Years	Team	Apps	(Gls)
–	Iceland	247	(303)

Jakob Óskar Sigurðsson (born 28 March 1964) is an Icelandic former handball player who competed at three olympic games: in the 1984 Summer Olympics, in the 1988 Summer Olympics, and in the 1992 Summer Olympics. He is currently the CEO of Victrex International, a major worldwide manufacturer of peek polymer.
