= United States at the 1988 Summer Olympics =

- Flag of the United States
- IOC code: USA
- NOC: United States Olympic Committee

in Seoul
- Competitors: 527 (332 men and 195 women) in 27 sports
- Flag bearer: Evelyn Ashford
- Medals Ranked 3rd: Gold 36 Silver 31 Bronze 27 Total 94

Summer Olympics appearances (overview)
- 1896; 1900; 1904; 1908; 1912; 1920; 1924; 1928; 1932; 1936; 1948; 1952; 1956; 1960; 1964; 1968; 1972; 1976; 1980; 1984; 1988; 1992; 1996; 2000; 2004; 2008; 2012; 2016; 2020; 2024; 2028

Other related appearances
- 1906 Intercalated Games

The United States of America (USA) competed at the 1988 Summer Olympics in Seoul, South Korea. 527 competitors, 332 men and 195 women, took part in 230 events in 27 sports.

== Medal totals ==
The United States finished outside of the top two in the overall medal count (third behind the Soviet Union and East Germany) for the first time and in the gold medal count for only the second time. It was revealed thereafter that the Soviet Union and East Germany operated extensive state-sponsored doping programs to prepare for the Games.

== Medalists ==
The following U.S. competitors won medals at the games. In the discipline sections below, the medalists' names are bolded.

Medal	Name	Sport	Event	Date
Gold	Janet Evans	Swimming	Women's 400 meter individual medley	September 19
Gold	Greg Louganis	Diving	Men's 3 meter springboard	September 20
Gold	Matt Biondi; Matt Cetlinski; Troy Dalbey; Doug Gjertsen; Dan Jorgensen^{[a]} Craig Oppel^{[a]}	Swimming	Men's 4 × 200 meter freestyle relay	September 21
Gold	Matt Biondi	Swimming	Men's 100 meter freestyle	September 22
Gold	Janet Evans	Swimming	Women's 400 meter freestyle	September 22
Gold	Matt Biondi; Troy Dalbey; Doug Gjertsen^{[a]} Chris Jacobs; Tom Jager; Shaun Jordan^{[a]} Brent Lang^{[a]}	Swimming	Men's 4 × 100 meter freestyle relay	September 23
Gold	Carl Lewis	Athletics	Men's 100 meters	September 24
Gold	Jackie Joyner-Kersee	Athletics	Women's heptathlon	September 24
Gold	Matt Biondi	Swimming	Men's 50 meter freestyle	September 24
Gold	Janet Evans	Swimming	Women's 800 meter freestyle	September 24
Gold	Andre Phillips	Athletics	Men's 400 meter hurdles	September 25
Gold	Carl Lewis	Athletics	Men's long jump	September 25
Gold	Florence Griffith-Joyner	Athletics	Women's 100 meters	September 25
Gold	David Berkoff; Matt Biondi; Chris Jacobs; Tom Jager^{[a]} Jay Mortenson^{[a]} Richard Schroeder	Swimming	Men's 4 × 100 meter medley relay	September 25
Gold	Roger Kingdom	Athletics	Men's 110 meter hurdles	September 26
Gold	Greg Louganis	Diving	Men's 10 meter platform	September 27
Gold	Lynne Jewell; Allison Jolly	Sailing	Women's 470	September 27
Gold	Joe DeLoach	Athletics	Men's 200 meters	September 28
Gold	Steve Lewis	Athletics	Men's 400 meters	September 28
Gold	Florence Griffith-Joyner	Athletics	Women's 200 meters	September 29
Gold	Jackie Joyner-Kersee	Athletics	Women's long jump	September 29
Gold	United States women's national basketball team: Cynthia Brown; Vicky Bullett; Cynthia Cooper; Anne Donovan; Teresa Edwards; Kamie Ethridge; Jennifer Gillom; Bridgette Gordon; Andrea Lloyd; Katrina McClain; Suzie McCoonnell; Teresa Weatherspoon	Basketball	Women's tournament	September 29
Gold	John Smith	Wrestling	Freestyle 62 kilogram	September 29
Gold	Jay Barrs	Archery	Men's individual	September 30
Gold	Louise Ritter	Athletics	Women's high jump	September 30
Gold	Ken Flach; Robert Seguso	Tennis	Men's doubles	September 30
Gold	Zina Garrison; Pam Shriver	Tennis	Women's doubles	September 30
Gold	Kenny Monday	Wrestling	Freestyle 74 kilogram	September 30
Gold	Danny Everett; Steve Lewis; Antonio McKay^{[a]} Butch Reynolds; Kevin Robinzine; Andrew Valmon^{[a]}	Athletics	Men's 4 × 400 meter relay	October 1
Gold	Evelyn Ashford; Alice Brown; Sheila Echols; Florence Griffith-Joyner; Dannette Young^{[a]}	Athletics	Women's 4 × 100 meter relay	October 1
Gold	Kennedy McKinney	Boxing	Bantamweight	October 1
Gold	Ray Mercer	Boxing	Heavyweight	October 1
Gold	Greg Barton	Canoeing	Men's K-1 1000 meters	October 1
Gold	Greg Barton; Norman Bellingham	Canoeing	Men's K-2 1000 meters	October 1
Gold	Andrew Maynard	Boxing	Light heavyweight	October 2
Gold	United States men's national volleyball team: Craig Buck; Bob Ctvrtlik; Scott Fortune; Karch Kiraly; Ricci Luyties; Douglas Partie; Jon Root; Eric Sato; Dave Saunders; Jeff Stork; Troy Tanner; Steve Timmons	Volleyball	Men's tournament	October 2
Silver	Michele Mitchell	Diving	Women's 10 meter platform	September 18
Silver	Matt Biondi	Swimming	Men's 100 meter butterfly	September 21
Silver	David Wharton	Swimming	Men's 400 meter individual medley	September 21
Silver	Chris Jacobs	Swimming	Men's 100 meter freestyle	September 22
Silver	Randy Barnes	Athletics	Men's shot put	September 23
Silver	Hollis Conway	Athletics	Men's high jump	September 24
Silver	Erich Buljung	Shooting	Men's 10 meter air pistol	September 24
Silver	Tom Jager	Swimming	Men's 50 meter freestyle	September 24
Silver	David Berkoff	Swimming	Men's 100 meter backstroke	September 24
Silver	Beth Barr; Janel Jorgensen; Tracey McFarlane; Mary T. Meagher^{[a]} Betsy Mitchell^{[a]} Dara Torres^{[a]} Mary Wayte	Swimming	Women's 4 × 100 meter medley relay	September 24
Silver	Mike Powell	Athletics	Men's long jump	September 25
Silver	Evelyn Ashford	Athletics	Women's 100 meters	September 25
Silver	Kevin Asano	Judo	–60 kilogram	September 25
Silver	Thomas Bohrer; Richard Kennelly; David Krmpotich; Raoul Rodriguez	Rowing	Men's four	September 25
Silver	Anne Marden	Rowing	Women's single sculls	September 25
Silver	Hal Haenel; Mark Reynolds	Sailing	Star	September 27
Silver	William Baylis; Robert Billingham; John Kostecki	Sailing	Soling	September 27
Silver	Carl Lewis	Athletics	Men's 200 meters	September 28
Silver	Butch Reynolds	Athletics	Men's 400 meters	September 28
Silver	Gregory Best; Joe Fargis; Lisa Jacquin; Anne Kursinski	Equestrian	Team jumping	September 28
Silver	Tracie Ruiz	Synchronized swimming	Solo	September 30
Silver	Jay Barrs; Richard McKinney; Darrell Pace	Archery	Men's team	October 1
Silver	Valerie Brisco-Hooks; Diane Dixon; Florence Griffith-Joyner; Denean Howard; Sherri Howard^{[a]} Lillie Leatherwood^{[a]}	Athletics	Women's 4 × 400 meter relay	October 1
Silver	Michael Carbajal	Boxing	Light flyweight	October 1
Silver	Karen Josephson; Sarah Josephson	Synchronized swimming	Duet	October 1
Silver	Tim Mayotte	Tennis	Men's singles	October 1
Silver	United States men's national water polo team: James Bergeson; Greg Boyer; Peter Campbell; Jeffrey Campbell; Jody Campbell; Christopher Duplanty; Michael Evans; Douglas Kimbell; Edward Klass; Alan Mouchawar; Kevin Robertson; Terry Schroeder; Craig Wilson	Water polo	Men's tournament	October 1
Silver	Bruce Baumgartner	Wrestling	Freestyle 130 kilogram	October 1
Silver	Roy Jones Jr.	Boxing	Light middleweight	October 2
Silver	Riddick Bowe	Boxing	Super heavyweight	October 2
Silver	Gregory Best	Equestrian	Individual jumping	October 2
Bronze	Wendy Williams	Diving	Women's 10 meter platform	September 18
Bronze	Matt Biondi	Swimming	Men's 200 meter freestyle	September 19
Bronze	Dennis Koslowski	Wrestling	Greco-Roman 100 kilogram	September 21
Bronze	Mitzi Kremer; Jill Sterkel^{[a]} Dara Torres; Laura Walker; Mary Wayte; Paige Zemina^{[a]}	Swimming	Women's 4 × 100 meter freestyle relay	September 22
Bronze	Calvin Smith	Athletics	Men's 100 meters	September 24
Bronze	Connie Paraskevin-Young	Cycling	Women's sprint	September 24
Bronze	Edwin Moses	Athletics	Men's 400 meter hurdles	September 25
Bronze	Larry Myricks	Athletics	Men's long jump	September 25
Bronze	Kelly McCormick	Diving	Women's 3 meter springboard	September 25
Bronze	Phoebe Mills	Gymnastics	Balance beam	September 25
Bronze	Seth Bauer; Doug Burden; Jeffrey McLaughlin; Peter Nordell; Ted Patton; John Pescatore; Jack Rusher; Jonathan Smith; Mike Teti	Rowing	Men's eight	September 25
Bronze	Jill Sterkel	Swimming	Women's 50 meter freestyle	September 25
Bronze	Mary T. Meagher	Swimming	Women's 200 meter butterfly	September 25
Bronze	Tonie Campbell	Athletics	Men's 110 meter hurdles	September 26
Bronze	Kim Gallagher	Athletics	Women's 800 meters	September 26
Bronze	Michael Swain	Judo	–71 kilogram	September 27
Bronze	Mike Gebhardt	Sailing	Men's Division II	September 27
Bronze	Charles McKee; John Shadden	Sailing	Men's 470	September 27
Bronze	Danny Everett	Athletics	Men's 400 meters	September 28
Bronze	United States men's national basketball team: Willie Anderson; Stacey Augmon; Bimbo Coles; Jeffrey Grayer; Hersey Hawkins; Dan Majerle; Danny Manning; Herman Reid; Mitch Richmond; David Robinson; Charles D. Smith; Charles E. Smith	Basketball	Men's tournament	September 30
Bronze	William Scherr	Wrestling	Freestyle 100 kilogram	September 30
Bronze	Debra Ochs; Denise Parker; Melanie Skillman	Archery	Women's team	October 1
Bronze	Romallis Ellis	Boxing	Lightweight	October 1
Bronze	Kenneth Gould	Boxing	Welterweight	October 1
Bronze	Brad Gilbert	Tennis	Men's singles	October 1
Bronze	Zina Garrison	Tennis	Women's singles	October 1
Bronze	Nathaniel Carr	Wrestling	Freestyle 68 kilogram	October 1

Medals by sport
Sport	1st place, gold medalist(s)	2nd place, silver medalist(s)	3rd place, bronze medalist(s)	Total
Athletics	13	7	6	**26**
Swimming	8	6	4	**18**
Boxing	3	3	2	**8**
Wrestling	2	1	3	**6**
Diving	2	1	2	**5**
Tennis	2	1	2	**5**
Canoeing	2	0	0	**2**
Sailing	1	2	2	**5**
Archery	1	1	1	**3**
Basketball	1	0	1	**2**
Volleyball	1	0	0	**1**
Rowing	0	2	1	**3**
Equestrian	0	2	0	**2**
Synchronized swimming	0	2	0	**2**
Judo	0	1	1	**2**
Shooting	0	1	0	**1**
Water polo	0	1	0	**1**
Cycling	0	0	1	**1**
Gymnastics	0	0	1	**1**
Total	36	31	27	94

Medals by day
Day	Date	1st place, gold medalist(s)	2nd place, silver medalist(s)	3rd place, bronze medalist(s)	Total
1	September 18	0	1	1	**2**
2	September 19	1	0	1	**2**
3	September 20	1	0	0	**1**
4	September 21	1	2	1	**4**
5	September 22	2	1	1	**4**
6	September 23	1	1	0	**2**
7	September 24	4	5	2	**11**
8	September 25	4	5	7	**16**
9	September 26	1	0	2	**3**
10	September 27	2	2	3	**7**
11	September 28	2	3	1	**6**
12	September 29	4	0	0	**4**
13	September 30	5	1	2	**8**
14	October 1	6	7	6	**19**
15	October 2	2	3	0	**5**
Total		36	31	27	94

Medals by gender
Gender	1st place, gold medalist(s)	2nd place, silver medalist(s)	3rd place, bronze medalist(s)	Total	Percentage
Male	24	23	17	**64**	68.1%
Female	12	7	10	**29**	30.8%
Mixed	0	1	0	**1**	1.1%
Total	36	31	27	94	100%

Multiple medalists
Name	Sport	1st place, gold medalist(s)	2nd place, silver medalist(s)	3rd place, bronze medalist(s)	Total
Matt Biondi	Swimming	5	1	1	**7**
Florence Griffith-Joyner	Athletics	3	1	0	**4**
Janet Evans	Swimming	3	0	0	**3**
Chris Jacobs	Swimming	2	1	0	**3**
Tom Jager	Swimming	2	1	0	**3**
Carl Lewis	Athletics	2	1	0	**3**
Greg Barton	Canoeing	2	0	0	**2**
Troy Dalbey	Swimming	2	0	0	**2**
Doug Gjertsen	Swimming	2	0	0	**2**
Jackie Joyner-Kersee	Athletics	2	0	0	**2**
Steve Lewis	Athletics	2	0	0	**2**
Greg Louganis	Diving	2	0	0	**2**
Evelyn Ashford	Athletics	1	1	0	**2**
Jay Barrs	Archery	1	1	0	**2**
David Berkoff	Swimming	1	1	0	**2**
Butch Reynolds	Athletics	1	1	0	**2**
Danny Everett	Athletics	1	0	1	**2**
Zina Garrison	Tennis	1	0	1	**2**
Gregory Best	Equestrian	0	2	0	**2**
Mary T. Meagher	Swimming	0	1	1	**2**
Dara Torres	Swimming	0	1	1	**2**
Mary Wayte	Swimming	0	1	1	**2**
Jill Sterkel	Swimming	0	0	2	**2**

^{a} - Indicates that the athlete competed in preliminaries but not the final.

== Archery ==
The United States continued to be a strong contender in archery, though it found that South Korea had taken the top spot in the sport. Jay Barrs was the only non-Korean to win a gold medal for archery in Seoul. Two-time gold medallist Darrell Pace and 1984 silver medallist Richard McKinney joined Barrs in winning the team silver, while the women's team added a bronze medal despite not having any of the individual archers advance to the final. With her women's team bronze, 15-year-old Denise Parker become the youngest medalist in the history of Olympic archery.

Men

Athlete	Event	Preliminary round		1/8 final		Quarterfinal		Semifinal		Final	
Athlete	Event	Score	Rank	Score	Rank	Score	Rank	Score	Rank	Score	Rank
Jay Barrs	Individual	1294	3 Q	313	13 Q	326	4 Q	334	2 Q	338	1st place, gold medalist(s)
Richard McKinney	Individual	1288	4 Q	321	6 Q	327	3 Q	332	3 Q	324	6
Darrell Pace	Individual	1257	19 Q	306	18 Q	329	1 Q	322	9	Did not advance	
Jay Barrs; Richard McKinney; Darrell Pace	Team	3839	2 Q	—N/a				992	1 Q	972	2nd place, silver medalist(s)

Women

Athlete	Event	Preliminary round		1/8 final		Quarterfinal		Semifinal		Final	
Athlete	Event	Score	Rank	Score	Rank	Score	Rank	Score	Rank	Score	Rank
Debra Ochs	Individual	1227	26	Did not advance							
Denise Parker	Individual	1263	11 Q	298	21	Did not advance					
Melanie Skillman	Individual	1252	15 Q	307	14 Q	318	9 Q	311	10	Did not advance	
Debra Ochs; Denise Parker; Melanie Skillman	Team	3742	4 Q	—N/a				988	2 Q	952	3rd place, bronze medalist(s)

== Athletics ==
The men's 100 meter sprint was marred by the usage of performance-enhancing drugs when the initial winner, Canadian sprinter Ben Johnson, tested positive for banned substances after the race and was stripped of the gold medal and his world record time of 9.79 seconds, thus allowing Carl Lewis to repeat as gold medal winner. In 1989, Johnson admitted to further PED usage between 1981 and 1988 and his world record of 9.83 seconds from the 1987 World Championships was rescinded as well, allowing Lewis's 9.92 seconds in the Olympic final became the new world record. This put the United States in position to sweep the gold medals in the men's sprint distances, including a sweep of all medals at the 400 meter distance. The United States men also won medals while setting Olympic records at both hurdle distances. In the men's relays, a fumbled baton exchange in the heat of the 4 × 100 caused a heartbreaking disqualification for the favored American team. In the 4 × 400, however, the United States cruised to victory while equaling the 20-year-old world record which had been set in Mexico City. In men's field events, the highlight came from Carl Lewis defending his gold medal from Los Angeles and leading the United States to a medal sweep in the long jump. In the women's events, Florence Griffth-Joyner had dominating performances in the 100 and 200 meter sprints, lowering the Olympic record by over 0.2 seconds in the 100 and lowering the world record by almost 0.4 seconds in the 200. She also helped the United States to strong performances in the relays, winning gold in the 4 × 100 and coming in second, while beating the previous world record, to a record-shattering performance by the Soviet team in the 4 × 400. Meanwhile, in the heptathlon, Jackie Joyner-Kersee dominated the competition while setting a world record that has not been approached in the succeeding 30 years. Joyner-Kersee's long jump performance in the heptathlon was enough to set the Olympic record for the discipline, only for her to eclipse it in the final of the long jump event. The high jump event also saw Louise Ritter eclipse the Olympic record on the way to a gold medal. Finally, the only United States medal in the middle-distance events came from Kim Gallagher, who captured bronze in the 800 meters.

Key

- Note–Ranks given for track events are within the athlete's heat only
- Q = Qualified for the next round
- q = Qualified for the next round as a fastest loser or, in field events, by position without achieving the qualifying target

Men
Track and road events

Athlete	Event	Heat		Quarterfinal		Semifinal		Final	
Athlete	Event	Time	Rank	Time	Rank	Time	Rank	Time	Rank
Carl Lewis	100 m	10.14	1 Q	9.99	1 Q	9.97	1 Q	9.92 WR	1st place, gold medalist(s)
Dennis Mitchell	100 m	10.37	1 Q	10.13	2 Q	10.23	3 Q	10.04	4
Calvin Smith	100 m	10.28	1 Q	10.16	1 Q	10.15	2 Q	9.99	3rd place, bronze medalist(s)
Joe DeLoach	200 m	20.98	1 Q	20.56	1 Q	20.06	1 Q	19.75 OR	1st place, gold medalist(s)
Carl Lewis	200 m	20.72	2 Q	20.57	1 Q	20.23	1 Q	19.79	2nd place, silver medalist(s)
Roy Martin	200 m	20.65	1 Q	20.54	2 Q	20.62	6	Did not advance	
Danny Everett	400 m	45.63	1 Q	44.33	1 Q	44.36	2 Q	44.09	3rd place, bronze medalist(s)
Steve Lewis	400 m	45.31	1 Q	44.41	1 Q	44.35	1 Q	43.87	1st place, gold medalist(s)
Butch Reynolds	400 m	46.28	3 Q	44.46	1 Q	44.33	1 Q	43.93	2nd place, silver medalist(s)
Tracy Baskin	800 m	1:50.38	4	Did not advance					
Mark Everett	800 m	1:49.86	4	Did not advance					
Johnny Gray	800 m	1:48.83	1 Q	1:45.96	1 Q	1:45.04	4 Q	1:44.80	5
Jeff Atkinson	1500 m	3:38.33	2Q	—N/a		3:39.12	5 Q	3:40.80	10
Mark Deady	1500 m	3:41.91	2 Q	—N/a		3:39.47	8	Did not advance	
Steve Scott	1500 m	3:41.57	2 Q	—N/a		3:38.20	1 Q	3:36.99	5
Terry Brahm	5000 m	13:45.28	13 q	—N/a		14:04.12	15	Did not advance	
Sydney Maree	5000 m	13:47.85	2 Q	—N/a		13:22.61	2 Q	13:23.69	5
Doug Padilla	5000 m	13:58.45	5 Q	—N/a		13:37.11	11	Did not advance	
Bruce Bickford	10,000 m	28:16.16	7 Q	—N/a				29:09.74	18
Steve Plasencia	10,000 m	DNF		—N/a				Did not advance	
Pat Porter	10,000 m	28:45.04	11	—N/a				Did not advance	
Arthur Blake	110 m hurdles	13.66	1 Q	13.65	2 Q	13.52	2 Q	13.96	8
Tonie Campbell	110 m hurdles	13.45	1 Q	13.47	1 Q	13.47	2 Q	13.38	3rd place, bronze medalist(s)
Roger Kingdom	110 m hurdles	13.40	1 Q	13.17 OR	1 Q	13.37	1 Q	12.98 OR	1st place, gold medalist(s)
Edwin Moses	400 m hurdles	49.38	1 Q	—N/a		47.89	1 Q	47.56	3rd place, bronze medalist(s)
Andre Phillips	400 m hurdles	49.34	1 Q	—N/a		48.19	1 Q	47.19 OR	1st place, gold medalist(s)
Kevin Young	400 m hurdles	49.35	1 Q	—N/a		48.56	2 Q	47.94	4
Brian Abshire	3000 m steeplechase	8:36.56	4 Q	—N/a		8:27.78	9	Did not advance	
Brian Diemer	3000 m steeplechase	8:38.40	4 Q	—N/a		8:23.89	7	Did not advance	
Henry Marsh	3000 m steeplechase	8:33.89	6 Q	—N/a		8:18.94	7 q	8:14.39	6
Lee McNeill; Dennis Mitchell; Albert Robinson; Calvin Smith	4 × 100 m relay	DSQ		—N/a		Did not advance			
Danny Everett; Steve Lewis; Antonio McKay^{[b]} Butch Reynolds; Kevin Robinzine; Andrew Valmon^{[b]}	4 × 400 m relay	3:02.16	1 Q	—N/a		3:02.84	1 Q	2:56.16 WR	1st place, gold medalist(s)
Mark Conover	Marathon	—N/a						DNF	
Ed Eyestone	Marathon	—N/a						2:19:09	29
Pete Pfitzinger	Marathon	—N/a						2:14:44	14
Jim Heiring	20 km walk	—N/a						1:27:30	38
Tim Lewis	20 km walk	—N/a						1:31:00	44
Gary Morgan	20 km walk	—N/a						1:27:26	37
Marco Evoniuk	50 km walk	—N/a						3:56:55	22
Andrew Kaestner	50 km walk	—N/a						4:12:49	34
Carl Schueler	50 km walk	—N/a						3:57:44	23

Field events

Athlete	Event	Qualification		Final	
Athlete	Event	Result	Rank	Result	Rank
Carl Lewis	Long jump	8.06	3 Q	8.72	1st place, gold medalist(s)
Larry Myricks	Long jump	8.19	2 Q	8.27	3rd place, bronze medalist(s)
Mike Powell	Long jump	8.34	1 Q	8.49	2nd place, silver medalist(s)
Willie Banks	Triple jump	16.57	7 Q	17.03	6
Robert Cannon	Triple jump	15.69	29	Did not advance	
Charles Simpkins	Triple jump	16.35	10 Q	17.29	5
Hollis Conway	High jump	2.28	=5 Q	2.36	2nd place, silver medalist(s)
Jim Howard	High jump	2.25	=13 q	2.31	10
Brian Stanton	High jump	2.25	=9 q	2.31	11
Earl Bell	Pole vault	5.40	=4 q	5.70	4
Billy Olson	Pole vault	5.40	=9 q	5.50	12
Kory Tarpenning	Pole vault	5.40	=4 q	5.50	10
Randy Barnes	Shot put	20.83	3 Q	22.39	2nd place, silver medalist(s)
Jim Doehring	Shot put	19.73	11 q	19.89	11
Gregg Tafralis	Shot put	19.71	12 q	20.16	9
Mike Buncic	Discus throw	63.16	6 q	62.46	10
Randy Heisler	Discus throw	59.08	17	Did not advance	
Mac Wilkins	Discus throw	62.48	7 q	65.90	5
Brian Crouser	Javelin throw	72.72	29	Did not advance	
Tom Petranoff	Javelin throw	77.48	18	Did not advance	
Dave Stephens	Javelin throw	78.42	14	Did not advance	
Lance Deal	Hammer throw	73.66	17	Did not advance	
Kenneth Flax	Hammer throw	72.70	18	Did not advance	
Jud Logan	Hammer throw	72.64	19	Did not advance	

Combined event – Decathlon

Athlete	Event	100 m	LJ	SP	HJ	400 m	110H	DT	PV	JT	1500 m	Points	Rank
Tim Bright	Result	11.18	7.05	14.12	2.06	49.34	14.39	41.68	5.70	61.60	4:51.20	8216	7
Tim Bright	Points	821	826	736	859	845	925	699	1132	762	611	8216	7
Dave Johnson	Result	11.15	7.12	14.52	2.03	49.15	14.66	42.36	4.90	66.46	4:29.62	8180	9
Dave Johnson	Points	827	842	760	831	854	891	713	880	835	747	8180	9
Gary Kinder	Result	11.31	7.00	14.89	1.97	51.79	DNS					DNF	
Gary Kinder	Points	793	814	783	776	734	DNS					DNF	

Women
Track and road events

Athlete	Event	Heat		Quarterfinal		Semifinal		Final	
Athlete	Event	Time	Rank	Time	Rank	Time	Rank	Time	Rank
Evelyn Ashford	100 m	11.10	1 Q	10.88	1 Q	10.99	1 Q	10.83	2nd place, silver medalist(s)
Florence Griffith-Joyner	100 m	10.88 OR	1 Q	10.62 OR	1 Q	10.70	1 Q	10.54^{[c]}	1st place, gold medalist(s)
Gwen Torrence	100 m	11.12	1 Q	10.99	2 Q	11.02	3 Q	10.97	5
Florence Griffith-Joyner	200 m	22.51	1 Q	21.76 OR	1 Q	21.56 WR	1 Q	21.34 WR	1st place, gold medalist(s)
Pamela Marshall	200 m	DNF		Did not advance					
Gwen Torrence	200 m	22.87	1 Q	22.25	1 Q	22.53	3 Q	22.17	6
Valerie Brisco-Hooks	400 m	51.96	1 Q	51.24	2 Q	49.90	2 Q	50.16	4
Diane Dixon	400 m	52.45	1 Q	51.98	2 Q	49.84	3 Q	50.72	5
Denean Howard	400 m	52.26	1 Q	51.02	3 Q	49.87	4 Q	51.12	6
Joetta Clark	800 m	2:00.83	2 Q	—N/a		2:03.32	7	Did not advance	
Kim Gallagher	800 m	2:01.70	1 Q	—N/a		1:57.39	2 Q	1:56.91	3rd place, bronze medalist(s)
Delisa Walton-Floyd	800 m	2:02.37	2 Q	—N/a		1:58.82	2 Q	1:57.80	5
Mary Decker	1500 m	4:03.61	2 Q	—N/a				4:02.49	8
Kim Gallagher	1500 m	4:07.22	4 Q	—N/a				4:16.25	11
Regina Jacobs	1500 m	4:18.09	11	—N/a				Did not advance	
Mary Decker	3000 m	8:44.15	4 Q	—N/a				8:47.13	10
Vicki Huber	3000 m	8:48.93	5 Q	—N/a				8:37.25	6
PattiSue Plumer	3000 m	8:45.21	7 q	—N/a				8:59.17	13
Lynn Jennings	10,000 m	32:18.44	8 Q	—N/a				31:39.93	6
Francie Larrieu-Smith	10,000 m	31:52.02	6 Q	—N/a				31:35.52	5
Lynn Nelson	10,000 m	32:15.45	6 Q	—N/a				32:32.24	15
Gail Devers	100 m hurdles	13.18	3 Q	13.22	4 Q	13.51	8	Did not advance	
Jacqueline Humphrey	100 m hurdles	13.24	4 Q	13.25	6 q	13.59	7	Did not advance	
LaVonna Martin	100 m hurdles	13.20	3 Q	13.20	5 q	13.29	7	Did not advance	
Leslie Maxie	400 m hurdles	57.60	5	—N/a		Did not advance			
Latanya Sheffield	400 m hurdles	55.61	4 q	—N/a		54.36	3 Q	55.32	8
Schowonda Williams	400 m hurdles	55.98	2 Q	—N/a		56.71	7	Did not advance	
Evelyn Ashford; Alice Brown; Sheila Echols; Florence Griffith-Joyner; Dannette Young^{[b]}	4 × 100 m relay	42.39	1 Q	—N/a		42.12	1 Q	41.98	1st place, gold medalist(s)
Valerie Brisco-Hooks; Diane Dixon; Florence Griffith-Joyner; Denean Howard; Sherri Howard^{[b]} Lillie Leatherwood^{[b]}	4 × 400 m relay	3:25.86	1 Q	—N/a				3:15.51	2nd place, silver medalist(s)
Nancy Ditz	Marathon	—N/a						2:33:42	17
Margaret Groos	Marathon	—N/a						2:40:59	39
Cathy O'Brien	Marathon	—N/a						2:41:04	40

^{b} - Indicates the athlete ran in a preliminary round but not the final.
^{c} - Griffith-Joyner's final time was faster than the Olympic record she had set in the quarterfinal but the wind reading during the race was 3 meters/second in favor of the sprinters, thus disallowing the race for any IAAF records.

Field events

Athlete	Event	Qualification		Final	
Athlete	Event	Result	Rank	Result	Rank
Sheila Echols	Long jump	6.37	16	Did not advance	
Jackie Joyner-Kersee	Long jump	6.96	3 Q	7.40 OR	1st place, gold medalist(s)
Carol Lewis	Long jump	6.40	13	Did not advance	
Patricia King	High jump	1.84	19	Did not advance	
Louise Ritter	High jump	1.92	=11 Q	2.03 OR	1st place, gold medalist(s)
Coleen Sommer	High jump	1.87	18	Did not advance	
Bonnie Dasse	Shot put	19.45	11 q	17.60	12
Ramona Pagel	Shot put	18.55	15	Did not advance	
Connie Price	Shot put	17.09	18	Did not advance	
Carol Cady	Discus throw	62.72	10 Q	63.42	11
Ramona Pagel	Discus throw	57.50	15	Did not advance	
Connie Price	Discus throw	57.04	16	Did not advance	
Donna Mayhew	Javelin throw	61.56	12 q	61.78	7
Karin Smith	Javelin throw	57.94	20	Did not advance	
Lynda Sutfin	Javelin throw	56.12	24	Did not advance	

Combined event – Heptathlon

Athlete	Event	100H	HJ	SP	200 m	LJ	JT	800 m	Points	Rank
Wendy Brown	Result	14.07	1.83	12.69	24.83	6.13	44.34	2:26.43	5972	18
Wendy Brown	Points	968	1016	707	902	890	751	738	5972	18
Cindy Greiner	Result	13.55	1.80	14.13	24.48	6.47	38.00	2:13.65	6297	8
Cindy Greiner	Points	1043	978	803	935	997	629	912	6297	8
Jackie Joyner-Kersee	Result	12.69	1.86	15.80	22.56	7.27 OR	45.66	2:08.51	7291 WR	1st place, gold medalist(s)
Jackie Joyner-Kersee	Points	1172	1054	915	1123	1264	776	987	7291 WR	1st place, gold medalist(s)

== Basketball ==
Summary

Team	Event	Preliminary round						Quarterfinal	Semifinal	Final / BM	
Team	Event	Opposition Result	Opposition Result	Opposition Result	Opposition Result	Opposition Result	Rank	Opposition Result	Opposition Result	Opposition Result	Rank
United States men	Men's tournament	Spain; W 97–53	Canada; W 76–70	Brazil; W 102–87	China; W 108–57	Egypt; W 102–35	1 Q	Puerto Rico; W 94–57	Soviet Union; L 76–82	Bronze medal final Australia; W 78–49	3rd place, bronze medalist(s)
United States women	Women's tournament	Czechoslovakia; W 87–81	Yugoslavia; W 101–74	China; W 102–88	—N/a		1 Q	—N/a	Soviet Union; W 102–88	Yugoslavia; W 77–70	1st place, gold medalist(s)

=== Men's tournament ===
This was the last time that the United States was represented by college players in Olympic competition. Other countries, meanwhile, used their best professionals.
Roster
The following is the United States roster in the men's basketball tournament of the 1988 Summer Olympics.

United States men's national basketball team – 1988 Summer Olympics roster
Players
Coaches

Pos.	No.	Name	Age – Date of birth	Height	Club	Ctr.
G	4	Mitch Richmond	23 – 30 June 1965	1.96 m (6 ft 5 in)	Kansas State Wildcats	(United States)
G	5	Charles Smith	20 – 29 November 1967	1.85 m (6 ft 1 in)	Georgetown Hoyas	(United States)
G	6	Bimbo Coles	20 – 22 April 1968	1.85 m (6 ft 1 in)	Virginia Tech Hokies	(United States)
G	7	Hersey Hawkins	21 – 29 September 1966	1.90 m (6 ft 3 in)	Bradley Braves	(United States)
G/F	8	Jeff Grayer	22 – 17 December 1965	1.96 m (6 ft 5 in)	Iowa State Cyclones	(United States)
F	9	Charles Smith	23 – 16 July 1965	2.08 m (6 ft 10 in)	Pittsburgh Panthers	(United States)
F	10	Willie Anderson	22 – 8 January 1966	2.01 m (6 ft 7 in)	Georgia Bulldogs	(United States)
G/F	11	Stacey Augmon	20 – 1 August 1968	2.03 m (6 ft 8 in)	UNLV Runnin' Rebels	(United States)
G/F	12	Dan Majerle	23 – 9 September 1965	1.98 m (6 ft 6 in)	Central Michigan Chippewas	(United States)
F	13	Danny Manning	22 – 17 May 1966	2.08 m (6 ft 10 in)	Kansas Jayhawks	(United States)
C	14	J. R. Reid	20 – 31 March 1968	2.06 m (6 ft 9 in)	North Carolina Tar Heels	(United States)
C	15	David Robinson	23 – 6 August 1965	2.16 m (7 ft 1 in)	Navy Midshipmen	(United States)

Head coach

John Thompson

Legend

- Club – describes last
  club before the tournament
- Age – describes age
  on 17 September 1988

Group play

Pos	Team	Pld	W	L	PF	PA	PD	Pts	Qualification
1	United States	5	5	0	485	302	+183	10	Quarterfinals
2	Spain	5	4	1	484	435	+49	9	Quarterfinals
3	Brazil	5	3	2	590	522	+68	8	Quarterfinals
4	Canada	5	2	3	479	455	+24	7	Quarterfinals
5	China	5	1	4	433	527	−94	6	9th–12th classification round
6	Egypt	5	0	5	338	568	−230	5	9th–12th classification round

Source: FIBA archive
Rules for classification: 1) points; 2) head-to-head points; 3) head-to-head goal average; 4) head-to-head number of points scored.

18 September 1988

Spain	53–97	United States
Scoring by half: 32–48, 21–49

Jamsil Gymnasium, Seoul

20 September 1988

Canada	70–76	United States
Scoring by half: 42–40, 28–36

Jamsil Gymnasium, Seoul

21 September 1988

Brazil	87–102	United States
Scoring by half: 55–63, 32–39

Jamsil Gymnasium, Seoul

23 September 1988

China	57–108	United States
Scoring by half: 26–59, 31–49

Jamsil Gymnasium, Seoul

24 September 1988

Egypt	35–102	United States
Scoring by half: 21–62, 14–40

Jamsil Gymnasium, Seoul

Quarterfinal

26 September 1988
11:45

Boxscore

United States	94–57	Puerto Rico
Scoring by half: 48–28, 46–29
Pts: Manning 18; Rebs: Manning 7 Asts: C.D. Smith 3		Pts: Cruz 12; Rebs: Mincy 8 Asts: Cruz 4

Jamsil Gymnasium, Seoul

Semifinal

28 September 1988
12:00

Boxscore

United States	76–82	Soviet Union
Scoring by half: 37–47, 39–35
Pts: Robinson 19; Rebs: Robinson 12; Asts: Coles 2		Pts: Kurtinaitis 28; Rebs: Sabonis 13; Asts: Volkov 5

Jamsil Gymnasium, Seoul

Bronze medal game

29 September 1988
21:30

Boxscore

Australia	49–78	United States
Scoring by half: 29–52, 20–26
Pts: Gaze 17; Rebs: Sengstock 6 Asts: Smyth 2		Pts: Majerle, Richmond, Robinson 12; Rebs: Richmond, Robinson 7 Asts: Richmond 2

Jamsil Gymnasium, Seoul

=== Women's tournament ===
Team roster
The following is the United States roster in the women's basketball tournament of the 1988 Summer Olympics.

United States women's national basketball team – 1988 Summer Olympics roster
Players
Coaches

Pos.	No.	Name	Age – Date of birth	Height	Club	Ctr.
G	4	Teresa Edwards	24 – 19 July 1964	1.75 m (5 ft 9 in)		(France)
PG	5	Kamie Ethridge	24 – 21 April 1964	1.65 m (5 ft 5 in)
F/C	6	Cindy Brown	23 – 16 March 1965	1.88 m (6 ft 2 in)		(France)
C	7	Anne Donovan	26 – 1 November 1961	2.03 m (6 ft 8 in)
PG	8	Teresa Weatherspoon	22 – 8 December 1965			(Italy)
F	9	Bridgette Gordon	21 – 27 April 1967	1.83 m (6 ft 0 in)		(Turkey)
F	10	Vicky Bullett	20 – 4 October 1967	1.91 m (6 ft 3 in)		(Italy)
F	11	Andrea Lloyd-Curry	23 – 2 September 1965	1.88 m (6 ft 2 in)		(Italy)
F	12	Katrina McClain Johnson	23 – 19 September 1965	1.85 m (6 ft 1 in)		(Turkey)
F/C	13	Jennifer Gillom	24 – 13 June 1964	1.91 m (6 ft 3 in)		(Turkey)
G	14	Cynthia Cooper-Dyke	25 – 14 April 1963	1.78 m (5 ft 10 in)	CD CREF	(Spain)
	15	Suzie McConnell-Serio	22 – 29 July 1966		Penn State Lady Lions	(United States)

Head coach

Kay Yow

Legend

- Club – describes last
  club before the tournament
- Age – describes age
  on 17 September 1988

Group play

Pos	Team	Pld	W	L	PF	PA	PD	Pts	Qualification
1	United States	3	3	0	282	234	+48	6	Semifinals
2	Yugoslavia	3	2	1	199	211	−12	5	Semifinals
3	China	3	1	2	200	214	−14	4	Classification round
4	Czechoslovakia	3	0	3	202	224	−22	3	Classification round

Source: FIBA
Rules for classification: 1) points; 2) head-to-head points; 3) head-to-head goal average; 4) head-to-head number of points scored.

19 September 1988
9:45

Boxscore

Czechoslovakia	81–87	United States
Scoring by half: 39–37, 42–50
Pts: Nováková 21; Rebs: Nováková 8 Asts: Kalužáková, Nováková 2		Pts: Edwards 24; Rebs: McClain 8 Asts: Edwards 2

Jamsil Gymnasium, Seoul

22 September 1988
9:45

Boxscore

United States	101–74	Yugoslavia
Scoring by half: 55–40, 46–34
Pts: Edwards 23; Rebs: McClain 9 Asts: Weatherspoon 2		Pts: Golić 16; Rebs: Dornik 4 Asts: Bajkuša, Vangelovska 2

Jamsil Gymnasium, Seoul

25 September 1988
11:45

Boxscore

China	79–94	United States
Scoring by half: 37–46, 42–48
Pts: Zheng 32; Rebs: Zheng 8 Asts: Cong 5		Pts: McClain 27; Rebs: McClain 13; Asts: Edwards 5

Jamsil Gymnasium, Seoul

Semifinal

27 September 1988
11:45

Boxscore

United States	102–88	Soviet Union
Scoring by half: 50–39, 52–49
Pts: Cooper 27; Rebs: McClain 15; Asts: Edwards 6		Pts: Zasulskaya 16; Rebs: Tuomaitė 6 Asts: Yakovleva 2

Jamsil Gymnasium, Seoul

Gold medal game

29 September 1988
12:00

Boxscore

Yugoslavia	70–77	United States
Scoring by half: 36–42, 34–35
Pts: Nakić 23; Rebs: Golić 10; Asts: Nakić 3		Pts: Edwards 18; Rebs: Brown 8 Asts: Edwards, McConnell 3

Jamsil Gymnasium, Seoul

== Boxing ==
There were several controversies involving the American boxers at the games. Young and talented Roy Jones Jr. dominated his opponents, never losing a round en route to the final, where he controversially lost a 3–2 decision to South Korean fighter Park Si-Hun despite pummeling Park for three rounds and landing 86 punches to Park's 32. The decision sparked outrage and an International Olympic Committee investigation found that the three judges who voted for Park Si-Hun had been bribed by South Korean officials. With some elements of corruption in Olympic boxing coming to light, refereeing standards were changed after the games to avoid future controversies. Corruption was also suspected in Michael Carbajal's decision loss in his gold medal match. In another controversial gold medal match, Riddick Bowe lost to future world heavyweight champion Lennox Lewis. After Lewis landed several hard punches the referee gave Bowe two standing eight counts and waved the fight off after the second one, even though Bowe seemed able to continue. In yet another controversy, Michael Carbajal lost the gold medal bout in the light flyweight, with suspicions of politics influencing the judges decision being quite widespread. Members of the U.S. Army Boxing Team (Anthony Hembrick, Andrew Maynard, Kennedy McKinney, Ray Mercer) trained for the Olympics at Fort Huachuca, Arizona.

Furthermore, middleweight Anthony Hembrick never had the opportunity to fight. Hembrick and his coach, Ken Adams, misinterpreted the fight schedule. Afterwards, they blamed the schedule for being too confusing. By the time Hembrick arrived at Chamshil Students' Gymnasium twelve minutes late, he had been disqualified and the match was being awarded to South Korean Ha Jong-ho.

Athlete	Event	First round	Second round	Third round	Quarterfinal	Semifinal	Final	
Athlete	Event	Opposition Result	Opposition Result	Opposition Result	Opposition Result	Opposition Result	Opposition Result	Rank
Michael Carbajal	Light flyweight	Bye	O (KOR); W 3–2	Hiền (VIE); W RSC	Olson (CAN); W 5–0	Isaszegi (HUN); W 4–1	Marinov (BUL); L 0–5	2nd place, silver medalist(s)
Arthur Johnson	Flyweight	Mannai (ITA); W 5–0	Singh (NEP); W RSC	Kim (KOR); L 0–5	Did not advance			=9
Kennedy McKinney	Bantamweight	Bye	Pérez (GUA); W RSC	Birajdar (IND); W WO	Mwema (KEN); W 5–0	Moolasan (THA); W RSC	Khristov (BUL); W 5–0	1st place, gold medalist(s)
Kelcie Banks	Featherweight	Tuur (NED); L KO	Did not advance					=33
Romallis Ellis	Lightweight	Bye	Lee (KOR); W 5–0	Traoré (MLI); W RSC	Chuprenski (BUL); W 3–2	Zülow (GDR); L 0–5	Did not advance	3rd place, bronze medalist(s)
Todd Foster	Light welterweight	Bye	Rahilou (MAR); W KO	Jeon (KOR); W KO	Cheney (AUS); L 2–3	Did not advance		=5
Kenneth Gould	Welterweight	Marwa (TAN); W 4–1	Ankamah (GHA); W 5–0	Masoe (ASA); W 5–0	Nyman (FIN); W 5–0	Boudouani (FRA); L 1–4	Did not advance	3rd place, bronze medalist(s)
Roy Jones Jr.	Light middleweight	Bye	Makalamba (MAW); W KO	Franke (TCH); W 5–0	Zaytsev (URS); W 5–0	Woodhall (GBR); W 5–0	Park (KOR); L 2–3	2nd place, silver medalist(s)
Andrew Maynard	Light heavyweight	Bye	Masoe (ASA); W RSC	—N/a	Erős (HUN); W 5–0	Petrich (POL); W RET	Shanavazov (URS); W 5–0	1st place, gold medalist(s)
Ray Mercer	Heavyweight	Bye	Gavenčiak (TCH); W RSC	—N/a	Gaudiano (ITA); W KO	Vanderlyde (NED); W RSC	Baik (KOR); W KO	1st place, gold medalist(s)
Riddick Bowe	Super heavyweight	Bye	Botowamungu (AUT); W KO	—N/a	Hrivňák (TCH); W RSC	Miroshnichenko (URS); W 5–0	Lewis (CAN); L RSC	2nd place, silver medalist(s)

== Canoeing ==
Men

Athlete	Event	Heat		Repechage		Semifinal		Final	
Athlete	Event	Time	Rank	Time	Rank	Time	Rank	Time	Rank
Jim Terrell	C-1 500 m	Bye^{[d]}		Bye		2:00.13	4	Did not advance	
Bruce Merritt	C-1 1000 m	4:17.73	6 R	4:41.75	3 SF	4:16.51	4	Did not advance	
Rodney McLain; Bruce Merritt	C-2 500 m	1:51.48	6 R	1:53.36	3 SF	1:53.32	5	Did not advance	
Gregory Steward; Ronald Urick	C-2 1000 m	4:26.56	6 R	4:17.77	4	Did not advance			
Mike Herbert	K-1 500 m	1:43.41	4 R	Bye^{[d]}		1:43.40	2 QF	1:46.73	4
Greg Barton	K-1 1000 m	3:42.26	1 SF	Bye		3:40.96	1 QF	3:55.27	1st place, gold medalist(s)
Terry Kent; Terry White	K-2 500 m	1:34.69	3 SF	Bye		1:36.33	3 QF	1:36.62	8
Greg Barton; Norman Bellingham	K-2 1000 m	3:20.50	2 SF	—N/a		3:25.36	1 QF	3:32.42	1st place, gold medalist(s)
Curt Bader; Michael Harbold; Terry Kent; Terry White	K-4 1000 m	3:07.70	2 SF	Bye		3:15.60	5	Did not advance	

Women

Athlete	Event	Heat		Repechage		Semifinal		Final	
Athlete	Event	Time	Rank	Time	Rank	Time	Rank	Time	Rank
Traci Phillips	K-1 500 m	1:59.53	4 SF	—N/a		1:59.48	3 QF	2:00.81	6
Shelia Conover; Cathy Marino-Geers	K-2 500 m	1:50.54	2 SF	Bye		1:54.16	3 QF	1:50.33	7
Shelia Conover; Shirley Dery-Batlik; Cathy Marino-Geers; Traci Phillips	K-4 500 m	1:41.77	4 SF	—N/a		1:43.17	3 QF	1:47.94	9

Key: QF – Qualified to medal final; SF – Qualified to semifinal; R – Qualified to repechage; ^{d} - Heat not held due to lack of competitors. All competitors scheduled for this heat advanced to the next round.

== Cycling ==
Nineteen cyclists represented the United States in 1988. Connie Paraskevin-Young won bronze in the women's sprint.

=== Road ===
Athlete	Event	Time	Rank
Scott McKinley	Men's road race	4:32:56	65
Bob Mionske	Men's road race	4:32:46	4
Craig Schommer	Men's road race	4:32:56	69
Norman Alvis; Jim Copeland; Tony Palmer; Andy Paulin	Men's team time trial	2:02:35.7	10
Bunki Bankaitis-Davis	Women's road race	2:00:52	14
Inga Thompson	Women's road race	2:00:52	8
Sally Zack	Women's road race	2:00:52	16

=== Track ===
Points race

Athlete	Event	Round one		Final	
Athlete	Event	Points	Rank	Points	Rank
Frankie Andreu	Points race	11	11 Q	21	8

Pursuit

Athlete	Event	Qualification		Round of 16	Quarterfinal	Semifinal	Final / BM	
Athlete	Event	Time	Rank	Opposition Result	Opposition Result	Opposition Result	Opposition Result	Rank
David Brinton	Individual pursuit	4:48.93	14 Q	Sturgess (GBR); L 4:47.27	Did not advance			
Dave Lettieri; Michael McCarthy; Leonard Nitz; Carl Sundquist	Team pursuit	4:22.96	9	Did not advance				

Sprint

Athlete	Event	Qualifying		Round 1	Repechage 1	Round 2	Repechage 2	Quarterfinal	Semifinal	Final / BM	
Athlete	Event	Time	Rank	Opposition Result	Opposition Result	Opposition Result	Opposition Result	Opposition Result	Opposition Result	Opposition Result	Rank
Ken Carpenter	Men's sprint	10.792	5	Abrams (GUY), Faccini (ITA); L	Alwi (MAS), Harnett (CAN), Lynch (BAR); L	Did not advance					
Connie Paraskevin-Young	Women's sprint	11.845	4	Speight (AUS), Tabor (CAN); W 12.11	Bye	—N/a		Zhou (CHN); W 12.85, W 12.94	Salumäe (URS); L, L	Bronze medal final Gautheron (FRA); W 14.07, W 12.41	3rd place, bronze medalist(s)

Time trial

Athlete	Event	Time	Rank
Bobby Livingston	1 km time trial	1:06.926	14

== Diving ==
Men

Athlete	Event	Preliminary		Final	
Athlete	Event	Points	Rank	Points	Rank
Mark Bradshaw	3 m springboard	588.15	7 Q	642.99	5
Greg Louganis	3 m springboard	629.67	3 Q	730.80	1st place, gold medalist(s)
Patrick Jeffrey	10 m platform	553.89	5 Q	483.54	12
Greg Louganis	10 m platform	617.67	1 Q	638.61	1st place, gold medalist(s)

Women

Athlete	Event	Preliminary		Final	
Athlete	Event	Points	Rank	Points	Rank
Wendy Lucero	3 m springboard	477.99	4 Q	498.81	6
Kelly McCormick	3 m springboard	473.73	5 Q	533.19	3rd place, bronze medalist(s)
Michele Mitchell	10 m platform	426.45	2 Q	436.95	2nd place, silver medalist(s)
Wendy Williams	10 m platform	402.54	4 Q	400.44	3rd place, bronze medalist(s)

== Equestrian ==
Dressage

Athlete	Horse	Event	Qualifying		Final	
Athlete	Horse	Event	Points	Rank	Points	Rank
Belinda Baudin	Christopher	Individual	1248	33	Did not advance	
Robert Dover	Federleicht	Individual	1327	12 Q	1320	13
Lendon Gray	Later On	Individual	1212	43	Did not advance	
Jessica Ransehousen	Orpheus	Individual	1308	=15 Q	1282	17
Belinda Baudin; Robert Dover; Lendon Gray; Jessica Ransehousen	as above	Team	3883	=6	—N/a	

Eventing

Athlete	Horse	Event	Dressage		Cross-country				Jumping			
Athlete	Horse	Event	Penalties	Rank	Penalties	Rank	Total	Rank	Penalties	Rank	Total	Rank
Bruce Davidson	Dr. Peaches	Individual	50.40	6	76.40	20	126.80	18	15	29	141.80	18
Phyllis Dawson	Albany II	Individual	54.60	10	40	13	94.60	10	5	=11	99.60	10
Karen Lende O'Connor	The Optimist	Individual	64.20	21	DNF				Did not advance			
Ann Sutton	Tarzan	Individual	57.20	14	DNF				Did not advance			
Bruce Davidson; Phyllis Dawson; Karen Lende O'Connor; Ann Sutton	as above	Team	162.20	4	DNF				Did not advance			

Jumping

Athlete	Horse	Event	Qualifying						Final					
Athlete	Horse	Event	Round 1		Round 2		Total		Round 1		Round 2		Total	
Athlete	Horse	Event	Points	Rank	Points	Rank	Points	Rank	Penalties	Rank	Penalties	Rank	Penalties	Rank
Greg Best	Gem Twist	Individual	69.50	=1	63.50	=10	133.00	=5 Q	4	=4 Q	0	1	4	2nd place, silver medalist(s)
Joseph Fargis	Mill Pearl	Individual	69.50	=1	63.50	=10	133.00	=5 Q	4	=4 Q	8	=8	12	=7
Lisa Ann Jacquin	For the Moment	Individual	16.00	58	24.00	51	40.00	56	Did not advance					
Anne Kursinski	Starman	Individual	69.50	=1	52.00	23	121.50	11 Q	4	=4 Q	4	=3	8	=4
Greg Best; Joseph Fargis; Lisa Ann Jacquin; Anne Kursinski	as above	Team	—N/a						12.25	2	8.25	1	20.50	2nd place, silver medalist(s)

== Fencing ==
19 fencers represented the United States in 1988.

Men

Athlete	Event	Round 1 pool		Quarterfinal pool		Semifinal pool		Elimination round										
Athlete	Event	Round 1 pool		Quarterfinal pool		Semifinal pool		Round 1	Round 2	Round 3	Barrage 1	Barrage 2	Barrage 3	Barrage 4	Quarterfinal	Semifinal / Cl.	Final / BM / Pl.	
Athlete	Event	W–T–L	Rank	W–L	Rank	W–L	Rank	Opposition Result	Opposition Result	Opposition Result	Opposition Result	Opposition Result	Opposition Result	Opposition Result	Opposition Result	Opposition Result	Opposition Result	Rank
Peter Lewison	Individual foil	2–2	3 Q	2–3	5 Q	3–1	1 Q	Sypniewski (POL); W 10–6	Érsek (HUN); L 7–10	Did not advance	Bye	Emura (JPN); W 10–8	Gátai (HUN); W 10–8	Romankov (URS); L 1–10	Did not advance			12
Dave Littell	Individual foil	2–0–3	4 Q	1–4	6	Did not advance												43
Mike Marx	Individual foil	3–0–2	3 Q	3–2	2 Q	0–4	5	Did not advance										36
Peter Lewison; Dave Littell; Mike Marx; Greg Massialas; George Nonomura	Team foil	0–0–3	4	—N/a											Did not advance			14
Robert Marx	Individual épée	0–0–4	5	Did not advance														71
Rob Stull	Individual épée	1–1–2	4 Q	3–1	2 Q	0–5	6	Did not advance										47
Stephen Trevor	Individual épée	2–2	4 Q	4–0	1 Q	1–4	5	Did not advance										=38
Robert Marx; Lee Shelley; Rob Stull; Stephen Trevor	Team épée	1–0–1	2 Q	—N/a											Hungary; L 3–9	Did not advance		11
Mike Lofton	Individual sabre	1–0–5	6	Did not advance						—N/a	Did not advance		—N/a		Did not advance			32
Steve Mormando	Individual sabre	3–0–3	3 Q	2–2	4 Q	3–2	3 Q	Alshan (URS); L 1–10	Did not advance	—N/a	Dalla Barba (ITA); L 7–10	Did not advance	—N/a		Did not advance			16
Peter Westbrook	Individual sabre	3–0–3	4 Q	2–2	4 Q	1–4	5	Did not advance		—N/a	Did not advance		—N/a		Did not advance			20
Bob Cottingham; Paul Friedberg; Mike Lofton; Steve Mormando; Peter Westbrook	Team sabre	1–0–2	3	—N/a											Did not advance			7

Women

Athlete	Event	Round 1 pool		Quarterfinal pool		Semifinal pool		Elimination round							
Athlete	Event	Round 1 pool		Quarterfinal pool		Semifinal pool		Round 1	Round 2	Barrage 1	Barrage 2	Quarterfinal	Semifinal / Cl.	Final / BM / Pl.	
Athlete	Event	W–L	Rank	W–L	Rank	W–L	Rank	Opposition Result	Opposition Result	Opposition Result	Opposition Result	Opposition Result	Opposition Result	Opposition Result	Rank
Caitlin Bilodeaux	Individual foil	3–1	1 Q	4–1	1 Q	3–2	2 Q	Fichtel (FRG); L 1–8	Did not advance	Królikowska (POL); W 8–6	Sun (CHN); L 5–8	Did not advance			11
Sharon Monplaisir	Individual foil	2–2	3 Q	1–4	6	Did not advance									35
Mary O'Neill	Individual foil	1–3	4 Q	0–5	6	Did not advance									36
Caitlin Bilodeaux; Elaine Cheris; Sharon Monplaisir; Mary O'Neill; Molly Sullivan	Team foil	1–1	2 Q	—N/a								Hungary; L 5–9	Classification semifinal South Korea; W 9–2	5th place final China; L 8–8	6

== Field hockey ==
Summary

Team	Event	Preliminary round				Semifinal / Cl.	Final / BM / Pl.	
Team	Event	Opposition Result	Opposition Result	Opposition Result	Rank	Opposition Result	Opposition Result	Rank
United States women	Women's tournament	Netherlands; L 1–3	Argentina; L 1–2	Great Britain; T 2–2	4	5th-8th place classification West Germany; L 1–2	7th place final Argentina; L 1–3	8

=== Women's tournament ===
The US women's field hockey team competed for the second time at the Summer Olympics.

Roster

- ( 1.) Patty Shea (gk)
- ( 2.) Yolanda Hightower
- ( 3.) Mary Koboldt
- ( 4.) Marcia Pankratz
- ( 5.) Cheryl Van Kuren
- ( 6.) Diane Bracalente
- ( 7.) Beth Beglin
- ( 8.) Marcella Place
- ( 9.) Sandra Vander-Heyden
- (10.) Tracey Fuchs
- (11.) Sheryl Johnson
- (12.) Sandra Costigan
- (13.) Christy Morgan
- (14.) Barbara Marois
- (15.) Megan Donnelly
- (16.) Donna Lee

Head coach: Boudewijn Castelijn

Preliminary round

Pos	Team	Pld	W	D	L	GF	GA	GD	Pts	Qualification
1	Netherlands	3	3	0	0	9	2	+7	6	Semi-finals
2	Great Britain	3	1	1	1	4	7	−3	3	Semi-finals
3	Argentina	3	1	0	2	2	3	−1	2	5th–8th place classification
4	United States	3	0	1	2	4	7	−3	1	5th–8th place classification

Source: FIH

21 September 1988
13:30

Netherlands	3–1	United States
H. Lejeune 29'; Von Weiler 34'; L. Lejeune 68'	Report	Johnson 44'

Umpires:
Dominique Ache (BEL)
R Tong (RSA)

23 September 1988
15:15

Argentina	2–1	United States
Colombo 11'; Garbo 36'	Report	Donnelly 61'

Umpires:
Dominique Ache (BEL)
Naomi Kato (JPN)

25 September 1988
09:00

United States	2–2	Great Britain
Morgan 37'; Johnson 60'	Report	Dixon 32'; Parker 51'

Umpires:
Jan Hadfield (AUS)
Margaret Lanning (CAN)

5th-8th place classification

27 September 1988
09:00

United States	1–2	West Germany
Donnelly 19'	Report	Wollschläger 41'; Blumenberg 49'

Umpires:
Jolanda Mohlmann (NED)
Naomi Kato (JPN)

8th place game

29 September 1988
11:00

United States	1–3 (a.e.t.)	Argentina
Morgan 41'	Report	Minnand 47'; Hussey 82'; Palma 84'

Umpires:
Margaret Lanning (CAN)
A Poelmans (NED)

== Football ==
Summary

Team	Event	Preliminary round				Quarterfinal	Semifinal	Final / BM	
Team	Event	Opposition Result	Opposition Result	Opposition Result	Rank	Opposition Result	Opposition Result	Opposition Result	Rank
United States men	Men's tournament	Argentina; T 1–1	South Korea; T 0–0	Soviet Union; L 2–4	4	Did not advance			

Roster Head coach: Lothar Osiander

No.	Pos.	Player	DoB	Age	Caps	Club	Tournament games	Tournament goals	Minutes played	Sub off	Sub on	Cards yellow/red
1	GK	David Vanole	February 6, 1963	25	?	(United States) Los Angeles Heat	3	0	270	0	0	0
2	DF	Steve Trittschuh	April 24, 1965	23	?	(United States) St. Louis Steamers	0	0	0	0	0	0
3	DF	John Doyle	March 16, 1966	22	?	(United States) University of San Francisco	2	1	135	0	1	0
4	DF	Kevin Crow	September 17, 1961	27	?	(United States) San Diego Sockers	3	0	270	0	0	0
5	DF	Mike Windischmann	December 6, 1965	22	?	(United States) Los Angeles Lazers	1	1	22	0	1	0
6	FW	Frank Klopas	September 1, 1966	22	?	(Greece) AEK Athens	2	0	180	0	0	0
7	FW	Jim Gabarra	September 22, 1959	28	?	(United States) Los Angeles Lazers	0	0	0	0	0	0
8	MF	Rick Davis	November 24, 1958	29	?	(United States) Tacoma Stars	3	0	270	0	0	(yellow card) 1
9	FW	Brent Goulet	June 19, 1964	24	?	(England) Crewe Alexandra F.C.	3	1	203	1	1	0
10	FW	Peter Vermes	November 21, 1966	21	?	(United States) New Jersey Eagles	2	0	180	0	0	0
11	FW	Eric Eichmann	May 7, 1965	23	?	(United States) Fort Lauderdale Strikers	0	0	0	0	0	0
12	DF	Paul Krumpe	March 4, 1963	25	?	(United States) Los Angeles Heat	3	0	245	1	0	0
13	MF	John Harkes	March 8, 1967	21	?	(United States) National team	2	0	92	1	1	0
14	DF	John Stollmeyer	October 25, 1962	25	?	(United States) Cleveland Force	2	0	59	1	1	0
15	MF	Tab Ramos	September 21, 1966	22	?	(United States) New Jersey Eagles	2	0	119	2	0	0
16	MF	Bruce Murray	January 25, 1966	22	?	(United States) Washington Stars	2	0	180	0	0	0
17	MF	Desmond Armstrong	November 2, 1964	23	?	(United States) Baltimore Blast	3	0	205	0	1	(yellow card) 1
18	GK	Jeff Duback	January 5, 1964	24	?	(United States) Boston Bolts	0	0	0	0	0	0
19	DF	Brian Bliss	September 28, 1965	22	?	(United States) Cleveland Force	3	0	270	0	0	(yellow card) 1
20	DF	Paul Caligiuri	May 9, 1964	24	?	(West Germany) SV Meppen	3	0	270	0	0	0

Preliminary round

Group C
Pos	Team	Pld	W	D	L	GF	GA	GD	Pts
1	Soviet Union	3	2	1	0	6	3	+3	5
2	Argentina	3	1	1	1	4	4	0	3
3	South Korea (H)	3	0	2	1	1	2	−1	2
4	United States	3	0	2	1	3	5	−2	2

Source: FIFA
(H) Hosts
18 September 1988

United States	1–1	Argentina
Windischmann 78'	Report	Alfaro 83' (pen.)

Daegu Civic Stadium, Daegu

20 September 1988

South Korea	0–0	United States
	Report

Busan Gudeok Stadium, Busan

22 September 1988

South Korea	1–2	Argentina
Noh Soo-jin 14'	Report	Alfaro 3'; Fabbri 73'

Busan Gudeok Stadium, Busan

== Gymnastics ==
In the women's artistic gymnastics team all-around competition, the United States women's team was penalized five-tenths of a point from their team score by the Fédération Internationale de Gymnastique (FIG) after the compulsory round. East German judge Ellen Berger noticed that Rhonda Faehn, who was the American team alternate and not competing, had been standing on the uneven bars podium for the duration of Kelly Garrison-Steve's compulsory uneven bars routine. Although Faehn was not a coach, Berger assessed the penalty under a rule prohibiting coaches from remaining on the podium while an athlete competes. The deduction caused the United States to fall to fourth place with a combined score of 390.575, three-tenths of a point behind East Germany. This incident remains controversial in the sport of gymnastics, as the United States outperformed the East German team and would have taken the bronze medal in the team competition had they not been penalized.

=== Artistic ===
Men
Team

Athlete	Event	Apparatus												Total	
Athlete	Event	F		PH		R		V		PB		HB		Total	
Athlete	Event	C	O	C	O	C	O	C	O	C	O	C	O	Score	Rank
Kevin Davis	Team	9.45	9.75	9.70	9.80	9.50	9.60	9.30	9.45	9.50	9.85	9.60	9.25	114.75	=53 Q
Scott Johnson	Team	9.70	9.85	8.85	9.65	9.30	9.80	9.50	9.70	9.70	9.80	8.75	9.60	114.20	63
Charles Lakes	Team	9.70	9.90	9.60	9.80	9.60	9.60	9.60	9.60	9.60	9.95	9.80	9.70	116.45	28 Q
Dominick Minicucci, Jr.	Team	9.35	9.55	9.30	9.60	9.55	9.50	9.50	9.35	9.60	9.65	9.45	9.50	113.90	=67
Lance Ringnald	Team	9.65	9.80	9.40	9.70	9.30	9.55	9.40	9.70	9.50	9.80	9.70	9.75	115.25	47 Q
Wes Suter	Team	9.40	9.70	9.45	9.60	9.15	9.35	9.50	9.50	9.40	9.80	9.35	9.65	113.85	69
Total	Team	96.90		96.00		95.30		95.45		97.10		96.10		576.85	11

Individual finals

Athlete	Event	Apparatus												Total	
Athlete	Event	F		PH		R		V		PB		HB		Total	
Athlete	Event	P	F	P	F	P	F	P	F	P	F	P	F	Score	Rank
Kevin Davis	All-around	9.600	9.650	9.750	9.700	9.550	9.650	9.375	9.800	9.675	9.650	9.425	9.500	115.325	34
Charles Lakes	All-around	9.800	9.900	9.700	9.950	9.600	9.700	9.600	9.750	9.875	9.800	9.750	9.850	117.175	19
Lance Ringnald	All-around	9.725	9.500	9.525	9.100	9.250	9.850	9.500	9.800	9.600	9.650	9.500	9.550	115.075	35

Women
Team

Athlete	Event	Apparatus								Total	
Athlete	Event	V		UB		BB		F		Total	
Athlete	Event	C	O	C	O	C	O	C	O	Score	Rank
Kelly Garrison-Steves	Team	9.700	9.750	9.700	9.750	9.775	9.800 Q	9.800	9.550	77.825	21 Q
Brandy Johnson	Team	9.850	9.800 Q	9.775	9.900	9.725	9.800	9.875	9.825	78.550	=11 Q
Missy Marlowe	Team	9.600	9.750	9.750	9.775	8.975	9.725	9.625	9.650	76.850	46
Phoebe Mills	Team	9.650	9.800	9.750	9.925 Q	9.850	9.900 Q	9.900	9.900 Q	78.675	=6 Q
Chelle Stack	Team	9.675	9.825	9.225	9.875	9.625	9.675	9.700	9.800	77.400	=32
Hope Spivey	Team	9.725	9.850	9.650	9.275	9.675	9.675	9.800	9.800	77.450	=30
Total	Team	97.625		97.350		97.550		98.050		390.575	4

Individual finals

Athlete	Event	Apparatus								Final	
Athlete	Event	V		UB		BB		F		Final	
Athlete	Event	P	F	P	F	P	F	P	F	Score	Rank
Kelly Garrison-Steves	All-around	9.725	9.825	9.725	9.750	9.787	9.675	9.675	9.775	77.937	16
Brandy Johnson	All-around	9.825	9.825	9.837	9.875	9.763	9.825	9.850	9.725	78.525	10
Phoebe Mills	All-around	9.725	9.800	9.837	9.850	9.875	9.275	9.900	9.775	78.037	15
Brandy Johnson	Vault	9.825	9.949	—N/a						19.774	5
Phoebe Mills	Uneven bars	—N/a		9.837	9.950	—N/a				19.787	8
Kelly Garrison-Steves	Balance beam	—N/a				9.787	9.787	—N/a		19.574	7
Phoebe Mills	Balance beam	—N/a				9.875	9.887	—N/a		19.762	3rd place, bronze medalist(s)
Phoebe Mills	Floor	—N/a						9.900	9.762	19.662	6

=== Rhythmic ===
Athlete	Event	Qualification						Final					
Athlete	Event	Rope	Hoop	Clubs	Ribbon	Total	Rank	Rope	Hoop	Clubs	Ribbon	Total	Rank
Michelle Berube	All-around	9.55	9.50	9.55	9.50	38.10	=22	Did not advance					
Diane Simpson	All-around	9.45	9.45	9.50	9.40	37.80	26	Did not advance					

== Handball ==
Summary

Team	Event	Preliminary round						Final / Pl. round			Final / BM / Pl.	
Team	Event	Opposition Result	Opposition Result	Opposition Result	Opposition Result	Opposition Result	Rank	Opposition Result	Opposition Result	Rank	Opposition Result	Rank
United States men	Men's tournament	Iceland; L 15–22	Yugoslavia; L 23–31	Soviet Union; L 14–26	Sweden; L 12–26	Algeria; L 17–20	6	—N/a			11th place final Japan; L 21–24	12
United States women	Women's tournament	Yugoslavia; L 18–19	Czechoslovakia; L 19–33	South Korea; L 18–24	—N/a		4	China; L 22–31	Ivory Coast; W 27–16	3	—N/a	7

=== Men's tournament ===
Roster
The following players represented the United States:

- Brian Bennett
- James Buehning
- Scott Driggers
- Craig Fitschen
- Steven Goss
- Bob Hillary
- Boyd Janny
- Bryant Johnson
- William Kessler
- Stephen Kirk
- Peter Lash
- Joseph McVein
- Rod Oshita
- Joe Story
- Mike Sullivan

Preliminary round

Pos	Team	Pld	W	D	L	GF	GA	GD	Pts	Qualification
1	Soviet Union	5	5	0	0	130	82	+48	10	Gold medal game
2	Yugoslavia	5	3	1	1	116	109	+7	7	Bronze medal game
3	Sweden	5	3	0	2	106	91	+15	6	Fifth place game
4	Iceland	5	2	1	2	96	102	−6	5	Seventh place game
5	Algeria	5	1	0	4	89	109	−20	2	Ninth place game
6	United States	5	0	0	5	81	125	−44	0	Eleventh place game

20 September 1988; 18:00	Iceland	22–15	United States	Suwon Gymnasium, Suwon; Referees: Rauchfuß, Buchda (GDR)
20 September 1988; 18:00	Arason 8	(8–8)	Lash 4	Suwon Gymnasium, Suwon; Referees: Rauchfuß, Buchda (GDR)
20 September 1988; 18:00	3× (yellow card) 2× (suspension)		3× (yellow card) 5× (suspension)	Suwon Gymnasium, Suwon; Referees: Rauchfuß, Buchda (GDR)

22 September 1988; 10:00	Yugoslavia	31–23	United States	Suwon Gymnasium, Suwon; Referees: Lee, Park (KOR)
22 September 1988; 10:00	Vujović 7	(17–11)	Goss 7	Suwon Gymnasium, Suwon; Referees: Lee, Park (KOR)
22 September 1988; 10:00	2× (yellow card) 3× (suspension)		1× (yellow card) 5× (suspension)	Suwon Gymnasium, Suwon; Referees: Lee, Park (KOR)

24 September 1988; 18:00	Soviet Union	26–14	United States	Suwon Gymnasium, Suwon; Referees: Haak, Koppe (NED)
24 September 1988; 18:00	Tyumentsev 6	(10–5)	Goss 5	Suwon Gymnasium, Suwon; Referees: Haak, Koppe (NED)
24 September 1988; 18:00	2× (yellow card) 3× (suspension)		3× (yellow card) 3× (suspension)	Suwon Gymnasium, Suwon; Referees: Haak, Koppe (NED)

26 September 1988; 14:00	Sweden	26–12	United States	Suwon Gymnasium, Suwon; Referees: Brosio, Zaworotny (ARG)
26 September 1988; 14:00	B. Jilsén 6	(11–6)	Lash, Sullivan 4	Suwon Gymnasium, Suwon; Referees: Brosio, Zaworotny (ARG)
26 September 1988; 14:00	2× (yellow card) 1× (suspension)		2× (yellow card) 5× (suspension)	Suwon Gymnasium, Suwon; Referees: Brosio, Zaworotny (ARG)

28 September 1988; 10:00	United States	17–20	Algeria	Suwon Gymnasium, Suwon; Referees: Lelong, Tancrez (FRA)
28 September 1988; 10:00	Hillery, Lash 5	(8–10)	three players 3	Suwon Gymnasium, Suwon; Referees: Lelong, Tancrez (FRA)
28 September 1988; 10:00	3× (yellow card) 4× (suspension)		3× (yellow card) 2× (suspension)	Suwon Gymnasium, Suwon; Referees: Lelong, Tancrez (FRA)

11th place match

30 September 1988; 10:00	United States	21–24	Japan	Suwon Gymnasium, Suwon; Referees: Brosio, Zaworotny (ARG)
30 September 1988; 10:00	Goss 8	(11–8)	Tamamura 10	Suwon Gymnasium, Suwon; Referees: Brosio, Zaworotny (ARG)
30 September 1988; 10:00	2× (yellow card) 4× (suspension)		2× (yellow card) 3× (suspension)	Suwon Gymnasium, Suwon; Referees: Brosio, Zaworotny (ARG)

=== Women's tournament ===
Roster
The following players represented the United States:

- Kathy Callaghan
- Kim Clarke
- Laura Coenen
- Sandra DeLaRiva
- Megan Gallagher
- Amy Gamble
- Sam Jones
- Portia Lack
- Karyn Palgut
- Carol Peterka
- Angie Raynor
- Cindy Stinger
- Penny Stone
- Sherry Winn

Preliminary round

Pos	Team	Pld	W	D	L	GF	GA	GD	Pts	Qualification
1	South Korea (H)	3	2	0	1	76	67	+9	4 (Note: 25% rule: South Korea +3 GD, Yugoslavia –1 GD, Czechoslovakia –2 GD)	Final round
2	Yugoslavia	3	2	0	1	58	58	0	4	Final round
3	Czechoslovakia	3	2	0	1	81	69	+12	4	Placement round
4	United States	3	0	0	3	55	76	−21	0	Placement round

(H) Hosts
Notes:

21 September 1988; 18:00	Yugoslavia	19–18	United States	Suwon Gymnasium, Suwon; Referees: Marin, Şerban (ROU)
21 September 1988; 18:00	Galic, S. Mugoša 5	(10–8)	Jones 9	Suwon Gymnasium, Suwon; Referees: Marin, Şerban (ROU)
21 September 1988; 18:00	2× (yellow card) 3× (suspension)		2× (yellow card) 3× (suspension)	Suwon Gymnasium, Suwon; Referees: Marin, Şerban (ROU)

23 September 1988; 14:00	Czechoslovakia	33–19	United States	Suwon Gymnasium, Suwon; Referees: Christensen, Jørgensen (DEN)
23 September 1988; 14:00	Damitšová 8	(13–11)	Jones 10	Suwon Gymnasium, Suwon; Referees: Christensen, Jørgensen (DEN)
23 September 1988; 14:00	1× (yellow card) 3× (suspension)		1× (yellow card) 6× (suspension)	Suwon Gymnasium, Suwon; Referees: Christensen, Jørgensen (DEN)

25 September 1988; 14:00	South Korea	24–18	United States	Suwon Gymnasium, Suwon; Referees: Blademo, Wester (SWE)
25 September 1988; 14:00	Kim C. 7	(11–10)	Jones 6	Suwon Gymnasium, Suwon; Referees: Blademo, Wester (SWE)
25 September 1988; 14:00	2× (yellow card) 4× (suspension)		2× (yellow card) 3× (suspension)	Suwon Gymnasium, Suwon; Referees: Blademo, Wester (SWE)

Placement round

Pos	Team	Pld	W	D	L	GF	GA	GD	Pts
5	Czechoslovakia	3	3	0	0	93	52	+41	6
6	China	3	2	0	1	89	60	+29	4
7	United States	3	1	0	2	68	80	−12	2
8	Ivory Coast	3	0	0	3	40	98	−58	0

27 September 1988; 14:00	China	31–22	United States	Suwon Gymnasium, Suwon; Referees: Haak, Koppe (NED)
27 September 1988; 14:00	Sun 10	(12–13)	Jones 6	Suwon Gymnasium, Suwon; Referees: Haak, Koppe (NED)
27 September 1988; 14:00	3× (yellow card) 3× (suspension)		3× (yellow card) 2× (suspension)	Suwon Gymnasium, Suwon; Referees: Haak, Koppe (NED)

29 September 1988; 14:00	Ivory Coast	16–27	United States	Suwon Gymnasium, Suwon; Referees: Lee, Park (KOR)
29 September 1988; 14:00	Bah, Kramou 5	(6–14)	three players 4	Suwon Gymnasium, Suwon; Referees: Lee, Park (KOR)
29 September 1988; 14:00	2× (yellow card) 4× (suspension)		1× (yellow card) 2× (suspension)	Suwon Gymnasium, Suwon; Referees: Lee, Park (KOR)

== Judo ==
Athlete	Event	Round of 64	Round of 32	Round of 16	Quarterfinal	Semifinal	Repechage 1	Repechage 2	Repechage 3	Final / BM	
Athlete	Event	Opposition Result	Opposition Result	Opposition Result	Opposition Result	Opposition Result	Opposition Result	Opposition Result	Opposition Result	Opposition Result	Rank
Kevin Asano	–60 kg	Bye	Šedivák (TCH); W 0001–0000	Lee (HKG); W 1010–0000	Sheu (TPE); W 1010–0000	Hosokawa (JPN); W 0000–0000 Y	Bye			Kim (KOR); L 0000–0000 S	2nd place, silver medalist(s)
Joe Marchal	–65 kg	Bye	Wu (TPE); W 1000–0000	Yamamoto (JPN); L 0000–1000	Did not advance						=7
Mike Swain	–71 kg	Bye	Ombito (KEN); W 0200–0000	Beauchamp (CAN); W 0000–0000 Y	Loll (GDR); L 0001–0010	Did not advance	Bye		Stranz (FRG); W 0000–0000 Y	Bronze medal final Brown (GBR); ~~L0000–0001~~	3rd place, bronze medalist(s)
Jason Morris	–78 kg	Schaffter (SUI); W 0000–0000 K	Varaev (URS); L 0000–0000 Y	Did not advance							=20
Rene Capo	–86 kg	Bye	Spijkers (NED); L 0000–0020	Did not advance			—N/a	Did not advance			=19
Robert Berland	–95 kg	—N/a	Bye	Meiling (FRG); L 0000–0000 C	Did not advance		—N/a		Van de Walle (BEL); L 0000–1000	Did not advance	=7
Steve Cohen	+95 kg	—N/a	Blas (GUM); W 0101–0000	Salonen (FIN); L 0000–0000 Y	Did not advance		—N/a	Did not advance			=13

== Modern pentathlon ==
Three pentathletes represented the United States in 1988.

Athlete	Event	Riding (show jumping)			Fencing (épée one touch)			Swimming (300 m freestyle)			Shooting (25 m rapid fire pistol)			Running (4000 m cross-country)			Total	
Athlete	Event	Penalties	Rank	MP points	RR	Rank	MP points	Time	Rank	MP points	Score	Rank	MP points	Time	Rank	MP points	MP points	Rank
Michael Gostigan	Individual	EL		0	35 V – 30 D	26	820	3:21.24	14	1264	196	=4	1044	14:50.75	57	895	4023	60
Robert Nieman	Individual	156	35	944	41 V – 24 D	7	932	3:23.09	22	1248	194	=11	1000	14:45.89	55	910	5034	18
Robert Stull	Individual	630	59	470	44 V – 21 D	=3	983	3:24.25	27	1240	188	=43	868	14:06.02	42	1027	4588	49
Michael Gostigan; Robert Nieman; Robert Stull	Team	—N/a	18	1414	—N/a	=2	2735	—N/a	7	3752	—N/a	4	2912	—N/a	15	2832	13645	16

== Rowing ==
Men

Athlete	Event	Heat		Repechage		Semifinal		Final	
Athlete	Event	Time	Rank	Time	Rank	Time	Rank	Time	Rank
Andrew Sudduth	Single sculls	7:05.61	2 R	7:05.52	1 SF	6:59.70	2 FA	7:11.45	6
Kurt Bausback; Edward Ives	Coxless pair	6:40.15	3 R	7:04.99	3 SF	6:50.47	5 FB	7:26.65	9
Robert Espeseth; Jon Fish; Daniel Lyons	Coxed pair	7:17.36	3 SF	Bye		7:07.05	6 FB	7:24.18	11
Glenn Florio; Kevin Still	Double sculls	6:33.75	6 R	6:56.45	5	Did not advance			
Thomas Bohrer; Richard Kennelly; David Krmpotich; Raoul Rodriguez	Coxless four	6:03.67	1 SF	Bye		6:07.71	3 FA	6:05.53	2nd place, silver medalist(s)
Tom Darling; Chris Huntington; John Terwilliger; John Walters; Mark Zembsch	Coxed four	6:08.36	1 SF	Bye		6:15.30	2 FA	6:18.47	5
Charlie Altekruse; John Frackleton; Greg Montesi; John Strotbeck	Quadruple sculls	5:54.08	5 R	5:59.07	4	Did not advance			
Seth Bauer; Doug Burden; Jeffrey McLaughlin; Peter Nordell; Ted Patton; John Pescatore; Jack Rusher; Jonathan Smith; Mike Teti	Eight	5:39.26	3 R	5:35.63	1 FA	—N/a		5:48.26	3rd place, bronze medalist(s)

Women

Athlete	Event	Heat		Repechage		Semifinal		Final	
Athlete	Event	Time	Rank	Time	Rank	Time	Rank	Time	Rank
Anne Marden	Single sculls	8:01.55	1 SF	Bye		7:40.51	2 FA	7:50.28	2nd place, silver medalist(s)
Mara Keggi; Barbara Kirch	Pair	8:16.85	3 R	8:05.55	2 FA	—N/a		7:56.27	6
Monica Havelka; Cathy Thaxton-Tippett	Double sculls	7:38.62	4 R	7:29.52	2 FA	—N/a		7:21.28	6
Elizabeth Bradley; Jennifer Corbet; Cynthia Eckert; Sarah Gengler; Kim Santiago	Coxed four	7:33.42	4 R	7:28.01	2 FA	—N/a		7:09.12	5
Sherry Cassuto; Angie Herron; Jennie Marshall; Anne Martin	Quadruple sculls	6:42.93	2 R	6:39.10	3 FB	—N/a		6:14.28	9
Betsy Beard; Susan Broome; Christine Campbell; Peg Mallery; Stephanie Maxwell-Pierson; Abby Peck; Anna Seaton; Juliet Thompson; Alison Townley	Eight	6:24.55	3 R	—N/a^{[e]}	4 FA	—N/a		6:26.66	6

^{e} - Race not run, times from heats were used to rank boats.
Qualification legend: FA = Final A (medal); FB = Final B (non-medal); SF = Semifinal; R = Repechage

== Sailing ==
Men

Athlete	Event	Race							Total	
Athlete	Event	1	2	3	4	5	6	7	Points	Rank
Mike Gebhardt	Division II	8.0	0.0	8.0	~~17.0~~	10.0	14.0	8.0	48.0	3rd place, bronze medalist(s)
Brian Ledbetter	Finn	22.0	18.0	14.0	16.0	~~25.0~~	13.0	8.0	91.0	10
Charles McKee; John Shadden	470	10.0	3.0	3.0	~~17.0~~	10.0	18.0	8.0	51.0	3rd place, bronze medalist(s)

Women

Athlete	Event	Race							Total	
Athlete	Event	1	2	3	4	5	6	7	Points	Rank
Lynne Jewell; Allison Jolly	470	5.7	0.0	0.0	3.0	~~28.0~~	3.0	15.0	26.7	1st place, gold medalist(s)

Open

Athlete	Event	Race							Total	
Athlete	Event	1	2	3	4	5	6	7	Points	Rank
Paul Foerster; Andrew Goldman	Flying Dutchman	~~24.0~~	20.0	16.0	5.7	16.0	8.0	20.0	85.7	11
James Melvin; Patrick Muglia	Tornado	11.7	16.0	~~30.0~~	20.0	30.0	15.0	18.0	110.7	14
Hal Haenel; Mark Reynolds	Star	14.0	8.0	0.0	10.0	8.0	8.0	~~28.0~~	48.0	2nd place, silver medalist(s)
William Baylis; Robert Billingham; John Kostecki	Soling	3.0	0.0	8.0	0.0	3.0	~~10.0~~	0.0	14.0	2nd place, silver medalist(s)

== Shooting ==
Men

Athlete	Event	Qualification		Final			
Athlete	Event	Points	Rank	Points	Rank	Total	Rank
Erich Buljung	10 m air pistol	590 OR	1 Q	97.9	5	687.9 OR	2nd place, silver medalist(s)
Don Nygord	10 m air pistol	574	28	Did not advance			
Rojelio Arredondo	25 m rapid fire pistol	590	13	Did not advance			
John McNally	25 m rapid fire pistol	597	2 Q	93	8	690	7
Don Nygord	50 m pistol	559	11	Did not advance			
Darius Young	50 m pistol	556	16	Did not advance			
Todd Bensley	50 m running target	581	17	Did not advance			
Scott Swinney	50 m running target	580	18	Did not advance			
Roderick Fitz-Randolph	10 m air rifle	587	17	Did not advance			
Robert Foth	10 m air rifle	591	5 Q	101.5	3	692.5	4
Glenn Dubis	50 m rifle prone	595	15	Did not advance			
Webster Wright	50 m rifle prone	594	24	Did not advance			
Glenn Dubis	50 m rifle three positions	1174	4 Q	99.5	2	1273.5	5
Daniel Durben	50 m rifle three positions	1169	13	Did not advance			

Women

Athlete	Event	Qualification		Final			
Athlete	Event	Points	Rank	Points	Rank	Total	Rank
Kimberly Dyer	10 m air pistol	377	16	Did not advance			
Ruby Fox	10 m air pistol	375	22	Did not advance			
Kimberly Dyer	25 m pistol	578	24	Did not advance			
Ruby Fox	25 m pistol	577	26	Did not advance			
Launi Meili	10 m air rifle	395 OR	1 Q	98.3	8	493.3	6
Deena Wigger	10 m air rifle	392	10	Did not advance			
Launi Meili	50 m rifle three positions	582	8 Q	94.5	6	676.5	7
Wanda Jewell	50 m rifle three positions	579	13	Did not advance			

Open shotgun

Athlete	Event	Qualification		Semifinal				Final			
Athlete	Event	Points	Rank	Points	Rank	Total	Rank	Points	Rank	Total	Rank
Brian Ballard	Trap	144	17 Q	48	=3	192	12	Did not advance			
Daniel Carlisle	Trap	147	8 Q	47	=12	194	9	Did not advance			
George Haas III	Trap	143	23 Q	49	=1	192	12	Did not advance			
Carolyn Koch	Trap	130	47	Did not advance							
Daniel Carlisle	Skeet	149	2 Q	48	=17	197	3 Q	23	=3	220	4
Terry Carlisle	Skeet	139	49	Did not advance							
Matthew Dryke	Skeet	147	10 Q	49	=23	193	24	Did not advance			
Richard Smith	Skeet	145	26	Did not advance							

== Swimming ==
Men

Athlete	Event	Heat		Final	
Athlete	Event	Time	Rank	Time	Rank
Matt Biondi	50 m freestyle	22.39 OR	1 FA	22.14 WR	1st place, gold medalist(s)
Tom Jager	50 m freestyle	22.61	=3 FA	22.36	2nd place, silver medalist(s)
Matt Biondi	100 m freestyle	49.04 OR	1 FA	48.63 OR	1st place, gold medalist(s)
Chris Jacobs	100 m freestyle	49.20 OR	2 FA	48.63	2nd place, silver medalist(s)
Matt Biondi	200 m freestyle	1:48.39	2 FA	1:47.99	3rd place, bronze medalist(s)
Troy Dalbey	200 m freestyle	1:48.96	5 FA	1:48.86	7
Matt Cetlinski	400 m freestyle	3:50.82	8 FA	3:48.09	4
Dan Jorgensen	400 m freestyle	3:52.64	11 FB	3:55.34	14
Matt Cetlinski	1500 m freestyle	15:07.41	1 FA	15:14.76	4
Lars Jorgensen	1500 m freestyle	15:39.51	23	Did not advance	
David Berkoff	100 m backstroke	54.51 WR	1 FA	55.18	2nd place, silver medalist(s)
Jay Mortenson	100 m backstroke	57.19	13 FB	57.06	11
Dan Veatch	200 m backstroke	2:01.73	5 FA	2:02.26	7
Steve Bigelow	200 m backstroke	2:03.64	15 FB	2:02.95	10
Richard Schroeder	100 m breaststroke	1:03.05	7 FA	1:02.55	6
Daniel Watters	100 m breaststroke	1:04.04	15 FB	1:04.17	15
Mike Barrowman	200 m breaststroke	2:15.85	3 FA	2:15.45	4
Kirk Stackle	200 m breaststroke	2:19.47	19	Did not advance	
Matt Biondi	100 m butterfly	53.46	2 FA	53.01	2nd place, silver medalist(s)
Jay Mortenson	100 m butterfly	54.44	8 FA	54.07	6
Mark Dean	200 m butterfly	2:00.86	10 FB	2:00.26	9
Melvin Stewart	200 m butterfly	1:59.78	6 FA	1:59.19	5
Bill Stapleton	200 m individual medley	2:05.32	12 FB	2:06.82	16
David Wharton	200 m individual medley	2:04.44	9 FB	2:03.05	9
Jeff Kostoff	400 m individual medley	4:24.10	10 FB	4:22.95	9
David Wharton	400 m individual medley	4:20.84	4 FA	4:17.36	2nd place, silver medalist(s)
Matt Biondi; Troy Dalbey; Doug Gjertsen^{[f]} Chris Jacobs; Tom Jager; Shaun Jordan^{[f]} Brent Lang^{[f]}	4 × 100 m freestyle relay	3:19.52	1 FA	3:16.53 WR	1st place, gold medalist(s)
Matt Biondi; Matt Cetlinski; Troy Dalbey; Doug Gjertsen; Dan Jorgensen^{[f]} Craig Oppel^{[f]}	4 × 200 m freestyle relay	7:18.76	2 FA	7:12.51 WR	1st place, gold medalist(s)
David Berkoff; Matt Biondi; Chris Jacobs; Tom Jager^{[f]} Jay Mortenson^{[f]} Richard Schroeder	4 × 100 m medley relay	3:43.00	1 FA	3:36.93 WR	1st place, gold medalist(s)

Women

Athlete	Event	Heat		Final	
Athlete	Event	Time	Rank	Time	Rank
Leigh Ann Fetter	50 m freestyle	25.91	4 FA	25.78	5
Jill Sterkel	50 m freestyle	26.02	6 FA	25.71	3rd place, bronze medalist(s)
Mitzi Kremer	100 m freestyle	56.97	13 FB	56.83	12
Dara Torres	100 m freestyle	56.37	7 FA	56.25	7
Mitzi Kremer	200 m freestyle	2:01.45	7 FA	2:00.23	6
Mary Wayte	200 m freestyle	1:59.50	3 FA	1:59.04	4
Tami Bruce	400 m freestyle	4:10.73	3 FA	4:08.16	4
Janet Evans	400 m freestyle	4:10.12	1 FA	4:03.85 WR	1st place, gold medalist(s)
Tami Bruce	800 m freestyle	8:31.57	5 FA	8:30.86	5
Janet Evans	800 m freestyle	8:28.13	2 FA	8:20.20 OR	1st place, gold medalist(s)
Beth Barr	100 m backstroke	1:02.63	4 FA	1:02.78	5
Betsy Mitchell	100 m backstroke	1:02.85	5 FA	1:02.71	4
Beth Barr	200 m backstroke	2:13.91	4 FA	2:12.39	4
Andrea Hayes	200 m backstroke	2:14.77	5 FA	2:15.02	6
Susan Johnson	100 m breaststroke	1:11.09	12 FB	1:11.08	13
Tracey McFarlane	100 m breaststroke	1:10.59	6 FA	1:09.60	6
Tracey McFarlane	200 m breaststroke	2:23.11	12 FB	2:33.46	14
Susan Rapp	200 m breaststroke	2:34.21	15 FB	2:32.90	13
Janel Jorgensen	100 m butterfly	1:00.97	6 FA	1:00.48	5
Mary T. Meagher	100 m butterfly	1:11.09	8 FA	1:00.97	7
Mary T. Meagher	200 m butterfly	2:12.35	3 FA	2:10.80	3rd place, bronze medalist(s)
Trina Radke	200 m butterfly	2:13.05	7 FA	2:11.55	5
Whitney Hedgepeth	200 m individual medley	2:17.45	8 FA	2:17.99	8
Mary Wayte	200 m individual medley	DSQ		Did not advance	
Janet Evans	400 m individual medley	4:43.04	3 FA	4:37.76	1st place, gold medalist(s)
Erika Hansen	400 m individual medley	4:50.03	11 FB	4:51.93	11
Mitzi Kremer; Jill Sterkel^{[f]} Dara Torres; Laura Walker; Mary Wayte; Paige Zemina^{[f]}	4 × 100 m freestyle relay	3:45.10	3 FA	3:44.25	3rd place, bronze medalist(s)
Beth Barr; Janel Jorgensen; Tracey McFarlane; Mary T. Meagher^{[f]} Betsy Mitchell^{[f]} Dara Torres^{[f]} Mary Wayte	4 × 100 m medley relay	4:10.38	2 FA	4:07.90	2nd place, silver medalist(s)

^{f} - Athlete swam in the heat but not the final.
Note: Times in the first round ranked across all heats.
Qualification legend: FA – Advance to medal final; FB – Advance to non-medal final

== Synchronized swimming ==
Three female synchronized swimmers represented the United States in 1988.

Athlete	Event	Qualification						Final			
Athlete	Event	Technical figures		Free swim		Total		Free swim		Total	
Athlete	Event	Score	Rank	Score	Rank	Score	Rank	Score	Rank	Score	Rank
Tracie Ruiz	Solo	98.633	2	98.400	1	197.033	2 Q	99.000	=1	197.633	2nd place, silver medalist(s)
Karen Josephson; Sarah Josephson	Duet	97.684	2	98.600	1	196.284	2 Q	99.600	1	197.284	2nd place, silver medalist(s)

== Table tennis ==
Athlete	Event	Group stage								Round of 16	Quarterfinal	Semifinal	Final / BM	
Athlete	Event	Opposition Result	Opposition Result	Opposition Result	Opposition Result	Opposition Result	Opposition Result	Opposition Result	Rank	Opposition Result	Opposition Result	Opposition Result	Opposition Result	Rank
Sean O'Neill	Men's singles	Saive (BEL); L 0–3	Issaum (BRA); W 3–2	Lofti (TUN); W 3–0	Gatien (FRA); L 0–3	Cooke (GBR); L 0–3	Jiang (CHN); L 0–3	Klampár (HUN); L 0–3	6	Did not advance				
Insook Bhushan	Women's singles	Bisiach (AUS); W 3–0	Uchiyama (JPN); L 2–3	Popova (URS); L 0–3	Ben Aïssa (TUN); W 3–0	Chen (CHN); L 0–3	—N/a		4	Did not advance				
Diana Gee	Women's singles	Jiao (CHN); L 0–3	Kovtun (URS); L 0–3	Domonkos (CAN); L 2–3	Alejo (DOM); W 3–0	Urbán (HUN); L 0–3	—N/a		5	Did not advance				
Insook Bhushan; Diana Gee	Women's doubles	Kloppenburg / Vrieskoop (NED); L 0–2	Hrachová / Kasalova (TCH); L 1–2	Chen / Jiao (CHN); L 1–2	Cheng / Wan (MAS); W 2–0	Nemes / Nolten (FRG); L 1–2	Hoshino / Ishida (JPN); L 0–2	—N/a	6	—N/a	Did not advance			

== Tennis ==
Men

Athlete	Event	Round of 64	Round of 16	Quarterfinal	Semifinal	Final		
Athlete	Event	Opposition Result	Opposition Result	Opposition Result	Opposition Result	Opposition Result	Opposition Result	Rank
Brad Gilbert	Singles	Tauson (DEN); W 6–2, 7–5, 6–1	Cherkasov (URS); W 6–4, 1–6, 6–1, 6–2	Seguso (USA); W 6–2, 6–1, 6–2	Jaite (ARG); W 5–7, 6–1, 7–6^{(7–1)}, 6–3	Mayotte (USA); L 4–6, 4 6, 3–6	Did not advance	3rd place, bronze medalist(s)
Tim Mayotte	Singles	Song (KOR); W 6–3, 6–3, 6–4	Nargiso (ITA); W 2–6, 6–2, 6–4, 6–0	Mansdorf (ISR); W 6–4, 6–2, 6–4	Steeb (FRG); W 7–6^{(7–4)}, 7–5, 6–3	Gilbert (USA); W 6–4, 6–4, 6–3	Mečíř (TCH); L 6–3, 2–6, 4–6, 2–6	2nd place, silver medalist(s)
Robert Seguso	Singles	Odizor (NGR); W 6–4, 6–3, 6–2	Cahill (NZL); W 6–3, 7–6^{(7–3)}, 6–7^{(8–10)}, 6–2	Gilbert (USA); L 2–6, 1–6, 2–6	Did not advance			
Ken Flach; Robert Seguso	Doubles	—N/a	Suharyadi / Wailan-Walalangi (INA); W 6–3, 6–1, 7–5	Köves / Markovits (HUN); W 6–4, 6–4, 6–4	Christensen / Tauson (DEN); W 6–4, 7–5, 6–2	Mečíř / Šrejber (TCH); W 6–2, 6–4, 6–1	Casal / Sánchez (ESP); W 6–3, 6–4, 6–7^{(5–7)}, 6–7^{(1–7)}, 9–7	1st place, gold medalist(s)

Women

Athlete	Event	Round of 64	Round of 32	Round of 16	Quarterfinal	Semifinal	Final	
Athlete	Event	Opposition Result	Opposition Result	Opposition Result	Opposition Result	Opposition Result	Opposition Result	Rank
Chris Evert	Singles	Bye	Cecchini (ITA); W 6–2, 6–2	Reggi (ITA); L 6–2, 4–6, 1–6	Did not advance			
Zina Garrison	Singles	Bye	Hernández (MEX); W 6–1, 6–4	Paulus (AUT); W 7–5, 6–2	Shriver (USA); W 6–2, 6–3	Graf (FRG); L 2–6, 0–6	Did not advance	3rd place, bronze medalist(s)
Pam Shriver	Singles	Bye	Hetherington (CAN); W 6–2, 6–3	Maleeva (BUL); W 6–3, 3–6, 6–2	Garrison (USA); L 2–6, 3–6	Did not advance		
Zina Garrison; Pam Shriver	Doubles	—N/a		Bye	Demongeot / Tauziat (FRA); W 7–5, 6–2	Smylie / Turnbull (AUS); W 7–6^{(7–5)}, 6–4	Novotná / Suková (TCH); W 4–6, 6–2, 10–8	1st place, gold medalist(s)

== Volleyball ==
Summary

Team	Event	Preliminary round						Semifinal / Cl.	Final / BM / Pl.	
Team	Event	Opposition Result	Opposition Result	Opposition Result	Opposition Result	Opposition Result	Rank	Opposition Result	Opposition Result	Rank
United States men	Men's tournament	Japan; W 3–0	Netherlands; W 3–1	Argentina; W 3–2	France; W 3–0	Tunisia; W 3–0	1 Q	Brazil; W 3–0	Soviet Union; W 3–1	1st place, gold medalist(s)
United States women	Women's tournament	China; L 0–3	Brazil; W 3–2	Peru; L 2–3	—N/a		3	5th-8th semifinal East Germany; L 1–3	7th place final South Korea; W 3–2	7

=== Men's tournament ===
Roster
The following volleyball players represented the United States:

- Troy Tanner
- Dave Saunders
- Jon Root
- Bob Ctvrtlik
- Doug Partie
- Steve Timmons
- Craig Buck
- Scott Fortune
- Ricci Luyties
- Jeff Stork
- Eric Sato
- Karch Kiraly (c)
- Head coach: Marv Dunphy

Preliminary round

Pos	Team	Pld	W	L	Pts	SW	SL	SR	SPW	SPL	SPR	Qualification
1	United States	5	5	0	10	15	3	5.000	263	155	1.697	Semifinals
2	Argentina	5	3	2	8	11	7	1.571	219	211	1.038	Semifinals
3	France	5	3	2	8	10	7	1.429	222	190	1.168	5th–8th semifinals
4	Netherlands	5	3	2	8	10	7	1.429	202	183	1.104	5th–8th semifinals
5	Japan	5	1	4	6	5	12	0.417	182	225	0.809	9th–12th semifinals
6	Tunisia	5	0	5	5	0	15	0.000	101	225	0.449	9th–12th semifinals

18 September 1988	United States	3–0	Japan
18 September 1988	(15–13, 15–2, 15–2)

19 September 1988	United States	3–1	Netherlands
19 September 1988	(15–7, 12–15, 15–1, 15–11)

22 September 1988	United States	3–2	Argentina
22 September 1988	(11–15, 11–15 ,15–4, 17–15, 15–7)

24 September 1988	United States	3–0	France
24 September 1988	(17–15, 15–6, 15–13)

26 September 1988	United States	3–0	Tunisia
26 September 1988	(15–4, 15–6 ,15–4)

Semifinal

30 September 1988	Brazil	0–3	United States
30 September 1988	(3–15, 5–15, 11–15)

Final

2 October 1988	Soviet Union	1–3	United States
2 October 1988	(15–13, 10–15, 4–15, 8–15)

=== Women's tournament ===
Roster

- Deitre Collins
- Caren Kemner
- Laurel Kessel
- Liz Masakayan
- Jayne McHugh
- Melissa McLinden
- Kim Oden
- Prikeba Phipps
- Angela Rock
- Kimberly Ruddins
- Liane Sato
- Tammy Webb

- Head coach: Terry Liskevych

Preliminary round

Pos	Team	Pld	W	L	Pts	SW	SL	SR	SPW	SPL	SPR	Qualification
1	Peru	3	3	0	6	9	4	2.250	177	142	1.246	1st–4th semifinals
2	China	3	2	1	5	8	4	2.000	161	132	1.220	1st–4th semifinals
3	United States	3	1	2	4	5	8	0.625	140	167	0.838	5th–8th semifinals
4	Brazil	3	0	3	3	3	9	0.333	126	163	0.773	5th–8th semifinals

20 September 1988	China	3–0	United States
20 September 1988	(15–9, 15–5, 15–7); Report

23 September 1988	Brazil	2–3	United States
23 September 1988	(16–14, 5–15, 13–15, 15–12, 7–15); Report

25 September 1988	Peru	3–2	United States
25 September 1988	(12–15, 9–15, 15–4, 15–5, 15–9); Report

Classification semifinal

27 September 1988	East Germany	3–1	United States
27 September 1988	(15–13, 15–11, 10–15, 15–8); Report

7th place final

29 September 1988	South Korea	2–3	United States
29 September 1988	(4–15, 15–12, 15–13, 9–15, 8–15); Report

== Water polo ==
Summary

Team	Event	Preliminary round						Semifinal	Final / BM	
Team	Event	Opposition Result	Opposition Result	Opposition Result	Opposition Result	Opposition Result	Rank	Opposition Result	Opposition Result	Rank
United States men	Men's tournament	Yugoslavia; W 7–6	Spain; L 7–9	China; W 14–7	Greece; W 18–9	Hungary; W 10–9	1 Q	Soviet Union; W 8–7	Yugoslavia; L 7–9	2nd place, silver medalist(s)

Roster

- Craig Wilson
- Kevin Robertson
- James Bergeson
- Peter Campbell
- Douglas Kimbell
- Edward Klass
- Alan Mouchawar
- Jeffrey Campbell
- Greg Boyer
- Terry Schroeder
- Jody Campbell
- Christopher Duplanty
- Michael Evans

- Head coach: Bill Barnett

Preliminary round

Team	Pld	W	D	L	GF	GA	GD	Pts
United States	5	4	0	1	56	40	+16	8
Yugoslavia	5	4	0	1	60	38	+22	8
Spain	5	3	1	1	48	38	+10	7
Hungary	5	2	1	2	50	43	+7	5
Greece	5	1	0	4	45	66	−21	2
China	5	0	0	5	34	68	−34	0

September 21, 1988	United States	7–6	Yugoslavia	Jamsil Indoor Swimming Pool

September 22, 1988	United States	7–9	Spain	Jamsil Indoor Swimming Pool

September 23, 1988	United States	14–7	China	Jamsil Indoor Swimming Pool

September 26, 1988	United States	18–9	Greece	Jamsil Indoor Swimming Pool

September 27, 1988	Hungary	9–10	United States	Jamsil Indoor Swimming Pool

Semifinal

September 30, 1988	Soviet Union	7–8	United States	Jamsil Indoor Swimming Pool

Gold medal game

October 1, 1988	Yugoslavia	9–7	United States	Jamsil Indoor Swimming Pool

== Weightlifting ==
Athlete	Event	Snatch		Clean & jerk		Total	
Athlete	Event	Weight	Rank	Weight	Rank	Weight	Rank
Michael Jacques	–67.5 kg	125.0	=14	157.5	13	282.5	13
Tony Urrutia	–75 kg	150.0	=8	177.5	=10	327.5	8
Derrick Crass	–82.5 kg	140.0	=14	175.0	9	315.0	11
Curt White	–82.5 kg	140.0	=14	165.0	=13	305.0	14
Brett Brian	–90 kg	140.0	=14	180.0	=15	320.0	14
Arn Kritsky	–90 kg	147.5	11	185.0	=10	332.5	11
Jeff Michels	–110 kg	167.5	12	192.5	13	360.0	13
Rich Schutz	–110 kg	160.0	14	200.0	=11	360.0	11
John Bergman	+110 kg	167.5	7	185.0	14	352.5	10
Mario Martinez	+110 kg	175.0	=4	232.5	=3	407.5	4

== Wrestling ==
Key:

- TO – Victory by fall.
- PP – Decision by points – the loser with technical points.
- PO – Decision by points – the loser without technical points.
- ST – Technical superiority – a margin of victory of at least 15 points.
- SP - Technical superiority - a margin of victory between 12 and 14 points, the loser with technical points.
- SO - Technical superiority - a margin of victory between 12 and 14 points, the loser without technical points.
- DQ - Decision by forfeit
- PA - Decision by injury
- PZ - Loser disqualified for passivity, no technical points scored by either wrestler.
- P1 - Loser disqualified for passivity, winner leading by 11 points or less.
- Q – Qualify to gold medal bout
- q – Qualify to bronze medal bout

Athlete	Event	Pool stage									Final / BM / Pl.	
Athlete	Event	Opposition Result	Opposition Result	Opposition Result	Opposition Result	Opposition Result	Opposition Result	Opposition Result	Opposition Result	Rank	Opposition Result	Rank
Tim Vanni	Freestyle 48 kg	Marcuño (ESP); W 4–0^{ST}	Kobayashi (JPN); L 0–4^{TO}	El-Messouti (SYR); W 3.5–0.5^{SP}	Zeinalnia (IRI); W 4–0^{TO}	Şükrüoğlu (TUR); W 3–1^{PP}	Bye	—N/a		2 q	Bronze medal final Karamchakov (URS); L 1–3^{PP}	4
Ken Chertow	Freestyle 52 kg	Bourdin (FRA); L 1–3^{PP}	Olvera (MEX); W 3–1^{PP}	Yordanov (BUL); L 0.5–3.5^{SP}	Did not advance				—N/a	9	Did not advance	
Barry Davis	Freestyle 57 kg	Schwendtner (TCH); W 3–1^{PP}	Ak (TUR); L 1–3^{PP}	Nagy (HUN); L 0–4^{TO}	Did not advance				—N/a	7	Did not advance	
John Smith	Freestyle 62 kg	Orbán (HUN); W 3–1^{PP}	Shterev (BUL); W 3–1^{PP}	Skubacz (POL); W 3–1^{PP}	Lehto (FIN); W 3–1^{PP}	Schillaci (ITA); W 4–0^{TO}	Enkhee (MGL); W 3–1^{PP}	—N/a		1 Q	Sarkisyan (URS); W 3–0^{PO}	1st place, gold medalist(s)
Nate Carr	Freestyle 68 kg	Podolszki (HUN); W 4–0^{ST}	Shir (AFG); W 4–0^{ST}	Leipold (FRG); W 3–1^{PP}	Bye	Brown (AUS); W 3–0^{PO}	McKay (CAN); W 3–0^{PO}	Park (KOR); L 1–3^{PP}	Bye	2 q	Bronze medal final Akaishi (JPN); W 3–1^{PP}	3rd place, bronze medalist(s)
Kenny Monday	Freestyle 74 kg	Walker (GBR); W 3.5–0^{SO}	Jessel (MEX); W 4–0^{TO}	Nagy (HUN); W 3–1^{PP}	Sejdi (YUG); W 3–0^{PO}	Holmes (CAN); W 3–0^{PO}	Enkhbayar (MGL); W 3–0^{PO}	Rauhala (FIN); W 3–0^{PO}	—N/a	1 Q	Varayev (URS); W 3–1^{PP}	1st place, gold medalist(s)
Mark Schultz	Freestyle 82 kg	Nanev (BUL); W 3–0^{PO}	Trik (FRG); W 4–0^{ST}	Radomski (POL); W 3–1^{PP}	Kodei (NGR); W 4–0^{TO}	Gstöttner (GDR); W 4–0^{TO}	Tambouvtsev (URS); L 1–3^{PP}	Gençalp (TUR); L 0–3.5^{SO}	—N/a	3	5th place final Sükhbat (MGL); L 0–4^{PA}	6
Jim Scherr	Freestyle 90 kg	Cox (CAN); W 3–1^{PP}	Tóth (HUN); W 3–1^{PP}	Verma (IND); W 3–1^{PP}	English (GBR); W 4–0^{ST}	Ota (JPN); L 0–4^{TO}	Bye	—N/a		3	5th place final Alabakov (BUL); W 3–1^{PP}	5
William Scherr	Freestyle 100 kg	Wala (POL); W 4–0^{TO}	Bye	Strnisko (TCH); W 3–1^{PP}	Loban (GBR); W 3–1^{PP}	Puşcaşu (ROU); L 1–3^{PP}	Karaduchev (BUL); W 3–1^{PP}	—N/a		2 q	Bronze medal final Neupert (GDR); W 4–0^{TO}	3rd place, bronze medalist(s)
Bruce Baumgartner	Freestyle 130 kg	El-Hadad (EGY); W 4–0^{DQ}	Schröder (GDR); W 3–1^{PP}	Ramsaran (MRI); W 4–0^{ST}	Sandurski (POL); W 4–0^{ST}	—N/a				1 Q	Gobejishvili (URS); L 1–3^{PP}	2nd place, silver medalist(s)
Mark Fuller	Greco-Roman 48 kg	Saito (JPN); W 3–1^{PP}	Rønningen (NOR); L 1–3^{PP}	Maenza (ITA); L 1–3^{PP}	Did not advance		—N/a			5	Did not advance	
Shawn Sheldon	Greco-Roman 52 kg	Rønningen (NOR); L 1–3^{PP}	Hu (CHN); L 0–2^{PZ}	Did not advance				—N/a		8	Did not advance	
Anthony Amado	Greco-Roman 57 kg	Huh (KOR); L 0–3^{P1}	Bouallouche (MAR); W 4–0^{TO}	Sigde (NOR); W 3–1^{PP}	Holidis (GRE); L 0–4^{TO}	Did not advance		—N/a		5	Did not advance	
Isaac Anderson	Greco-Roman 62 kg	Tracz (POL); W 3–1^{PP}	Hu (CHN); W 3–0^{P1}	Loksairi (MAR); W 3–0^{P1}	An (KOR); L 0–3^{PO}	Madzhidov (URS); L 1–3^{PP}	—N/a			3	5th place final Behl (FRG); L 1–3^{PP}	6
Andrew Seras	Greco-Roman 68 kg	Ichillumpa (PER); W 4–0^{ST}	Pittner (AUT); W 4–0^{ST}	Julfalakyan (URS); L 1–3^{PP}	Lagerborg (SWE); L 0–0^{DQ}	Did not advance	—N/a			5	Did not advance	
David Butler	Greco-Roman 74 kg	Tracz (POL); L 1–3^{PP}	Podlesek (YUG); W 2–0^{PZ}	Ito (JPN); W 3–1^{PP}	Kim (KOR); L 0–3^{PO}	Did not advance		—N/a		6	Did not advance	
John Morgan	Greco-Roman 82 kg	Frinta (TCH); W 4–0^{TO}	N'To (CMR); W 4–0^{DQ}	Stoykov (BUL); L 0–0^{DQ}	Kleven (NOR); L 1–3^{PP}	Did not advance		—N/a		4	7th place final Daras (POL); W 4–0^{DQ}	7
Michial Foy	Greco-Roman 90 kg	Koschnitzke (GDR); L 0–4^{TO}	Cox (CAN); W 4–0^{TO}	Bye	Stenibach (FRG); L 1–3^{PP}	Did not advance		—N/a		6	Did not advance	
Dennis Koslowski	Greco-Roman 100 kg	Fukube (JPN); W 4–0^{ST}	Ahokas (FIN); W 4–0^{ST}	Marshall (CAN); W 3–0^{P1}	Gedekhauri (URS); L 1–3^{PP}	Bye	Wroński (POL); L 0–3^{PO}	Tertei (YUG); W 3–0^{PO}	—N/a	2 q	Bronze medal final Georgiev (BUL); W 3–0^{PO}	3rd place, bronze medalist(s)
Duane Koslowski	Greco-Roman 130 kg	Neumüller (AUT); W 3–1^{PP}	Bechara (LIB); W 4–0^{TO}	Klauz (HUN); L 0–3^{PO}	Karelin (URS); L 0–4^{ST}	—N/a				4	7th place final Wrocławski (POL); L 0–4^{DQ}	8

== See also ==
- United States at the 1987 Pan American Games
- United States at the 1988 Summer Paralympics
