= Wrestling at the 1988 Summer Olympics – Men's freestyle 130 kg =

Men's freestyle 130 kg at the Games of the XXIV Olympiad
- Venue: Sangmu Gymnasium
- Dates: 29 September–1 October 1988
- Competitors: 15 from 15 nations

Medalists
1st place, gold medalist(s)		David Gobejishvili	Soviet Union
2nd place, silver medalist(s)		Bruce Baumgartner	United States
3rd place, bronze medalist(s)		Andreas Schröder	East Germany

The Men's Freestyle 130 kg at the 1988 Summer Olympics as part of the wrestling program were held at the Sangmu Gymnasium, Seongnam.

== Medalists ==
Gold	David Gobejishvili; Soviet Union
Silver	Bruce Baumgartner; United States
Bronze	Andreas Schröder; East Germany

== Tournament results ==
The wrestlers are divided into 2 groups. The winner of each group decided by a double-elimination system.

Legend

- TF — Won by Fall
- SP — Won by Superiority, 12-14 points difference, the loser with points
- SO — Won by Superiority, 12-14 points difference, the loser without points
- ST — Won by Technical Superiority, 15 points difference
- PP — Won by Points, the loser with technical points
- PO — Won by Points, the loser without technical points
- P0 — Won by Passivity, scoring zero points
- P1 — Won by Passivity, while leading by 1-11 points
- PS — Won by Passivity, while leading by 12-14 points
- PA — Won by Opponent Injury
- DQ — Won by Forfeit
- DNA — Did not appear
- L — Losses
- ER — Round of Elimination
- CP — Classification Points
- TP — Technical Points

=== Eliminatory round ===
==== Group A ====
L		CP	TP		L
Round 1
0	Bruce Baumgartner (USA)	4-0 DQ		Hassan El-Hadad (EGY)	1
0	Andreas Schröder (GDR)	4-0 TF	1:12	Adam Sandurski (POL)	1
0	Ham Duk-won (KOR)	3-1 PP	6-4	Jesús Montesdeoca (ESP)	1
0	Dan Payne (CAN)	4-0 TF	0:21	Navind Ramsaran (MRI)	1
Round 2
0	Bruce Baumgartner (USA)	3-1 PP	11-1	Andreas Schröder (GDR)	1
1	Adam Sandurski (POL)	4-0 TF	1:00	Ham Duk-won (KOR)	1
2	Jesús Montesdeoca (ESP)	0-3 P1	4:14	Dan Payne (CAN)	0
1	Navind Ramsaran (MRI)			Bye	
1	Hassan El-Hadad (EGY)			DNA	
Round 3
2	Navind Ramsaran (MRI)	0-4 ST	0-15	Bruce Baumgartner (USA)	0
1	Andreas Schröder (GDR)	4-0 TF	1:05	Ham Duk-won (KOR)	2
1	Adam Sandurski (POL)	3-1 PP	4-3	Dan Payne (CAN)	1
Round 4
0	Bruce Baumgartner (USA)	4-0 ST	17-0	Adam Sandurski (POL)	2
1	Andreas Schröder (GDR)	3.5-.5 SP	15-3	Dan Payne (CAN)	2

Wrestler	L	ER	CP
Bruce Baumgartner (USA)	0	-	15
Andreas Schröder (GDR)	1	-	12.5
Daniel Payne (CAN)	2	4	8.5
Adam Sandurski (POL)	2	4	7
Ham Duk-won (KOR)	2	3	3
Navind Ramsaran (MRI)	2	3	0
Jesús Montesdeoca (ESP)	2	2	1
Hassan El-Hadad (EGY)	1	1	0

==== Group B ====
L		CP	TP		L
Round 1
0	László Klauz (HUN)	4-0 TF	16-0	Miroslav Luberda (TCH)	1
1	Ralf Bremmer (FRG)	1-3 PP	4-8	Hiroyuki Obata (JPN)	0
0	David Gobejishvili (URS)	4-0 ST	17-0	Dennis Atiyeh (SYR)	1
0	Atanas Atanasov (BUL)			Bye	
Round 2
1	Atanas Atanassov (BUL)	0-3 P1	5:17	László Klauz (HUN)	0
2	Miroslav Luberda (TCH)	0-4 TF	4:11	Ralf Bremmer (FRG)	1
1	Hiroyuki Obata (JPN)	0-4 TF	2:43	David Gobejishvili (URS)	0
1	Dennis Atiyeh (SYR)			Bye	
Round 3
2	Dennis Atiyeh (SYR)	0-4 ST	0-15	Atanas Atanassov (BUL)	1
0	László Klauz (HUN)	4-0 TF	0:17	Hiroyuki Obata (JPN)	2
2	Ralf Bremmer (FRG)	0-3 P1	4:43	David Gobejishvili (URS)	0
Round 4
2	Atanas Atanassov (BUL)	1-3 PP	1-6	David Gobejishvili (URS)	0
0	László Klauz (HUN)			Bye	
Round 5
1	László Klauz (HUN)	0-3 PO	0-10	David Gobejishvili (URS)	0

Wrestler	L	ER	CP
David Gobejishvili (URS)	0	-	17
László Klauz (HUN)	1	-	11
Atanas Atanassov (BUL)	2	4	5
Ralf Bremmer (FRG)	2	3	5
Hiroyuki Obata (JPN)	2	3	3
Dennis Atiyeh (SYR)	2	3	0
Miroslav Luberda (TCH)	2	2	0

=== Final round ===
	CP	TP	
7th place match
Adam Sandurski (POL)	3-1 PP	7-5	Ralf Bremmer (FRG)
5th place match
Dan Payne (CAN)	1-3 PP	3-8	Atanas Atanassov (BUL)
Bronze medal match
Andreas Schröder (GDR)	3-0 P1	4:21	László Klauz (HUN)
Gold medal match
Bruce Baumgartner (USA)	1-3 PP	1-3	David Gobejishvili (URS)

== Final standings ==
1. David Gobejishvili (URS)
2. Bruce Baumgartner (USA)
3. Andreas Schröder (GDR)
4. László Klauz (HUN)
5. Atanas Atanassov (BUL)
6. Dan Payne (CAN)
7. Adam Sandurski (POL)
8. Ralf Bremmer (FRG)
