= Wrestling at the 1988 Summer Olympics – Men's Greco-Roman 130 kg =

Men's Greco-Roman 130 kg at the Games of the XXIV Olympiad
- Venue: Sangmu Gymnasium
- Dates: 20–21 September 1988
- Competitors: 16 from 16 nations

Medalists
1st place, gold medalist(s)		Aleksandr Karelin	Soviet Union
2nd place, silver medalist(s)		Rangel Gerovski	Bulgaria
3rd place, bronze medalist(s)		Tomas Johansson	Sweden

The Men's Greco-Roman 130 kg at the 1988 Summer Olympics as part of the wrestling program were held at the Sangmu Gymnasium, Seongnam from September 20 to September 22. The wrestlers are divided into 2 groups. The winner of each group decided by a double-elimination system.

== Medalists ==
Gold	Aleksandr Karelin; Soviet Union
Silver	Rangel Gerovski; Bulgaria
Bronze	Tomas Johansson; Sweden

== Results ==
Legend

- FR — Won by forfeit
- D2 — Both wrestlers disqualified for passivity
- DQ — Disqualification from the entire competition
- P0 — Won by passivity, scoring zero points
- P1 — Won by passivity, while leading by 1–11 points margin
- PA — Win by injury default or withdrawal
- PO — Win by decision (1–11 points margin) and loser has no technical points
- PP — Win by decision (1–11 points margin) and loser has technical points
- PS — Won by passivity, while leading by 12–14 points margin
- SO — Win by superiority (12–14 points margin) and loser has no technical points
- SP — Win by superiority (12–14 points margin) and loser has technical points
- ST — Win by technical superiority (15 points margin)
- TF — Win by fall
- CP — Classification points

=== Eliminatory round ===
==== Group A ====
	Score		CP
Round 1
Duane Koslowski (USA)	5–3	Alexander Neumüller (AUT)	3–1 PP
Khodr Bechara (LIB)	0:30	Lubomír David (TCH)	0–4 TF
László Klauz (HUN)	5:30	Fritz Gerdsmeier (FRG)	3–0 P1
Aleksandr Karelin (URS)	4:00	Tomas Johansson (SWE)	3–0 P1
Round 2
Duane Koslowski (USA)	1:12	Khodr Bechara (LIB)	4–0 TF
Alexander Neumüller (AUT)	3:44	Lubomír David (TCH)	4–0 PA
László Klauz (HUN)	4:43	Aleksandr Karelin (URS)	0–3 P1
Fritz Gerdsmeier (FRG)	1–2	Tomas Johansson (SWE)	1–3 PP
Round 3
Duane Koslowski (USA)	0–2	László Klauz (HUN)	0–3 PO
Alexander Neumüller (AUT)	4:10	Aleksandr Karelin (URS)	0–4 TF
Tomas Johansson (SWE)		Bye	
Round 4
Tomas Johansson (SWE)	2–1	László Klauz (HUN)	3–1 PP
Duane Koslowski (USA)	0–15	Aleksandr Karelin (URS)	0–4 ST

Athlete	L	R	CP	TB
Aleksandr Karelin (URS)	0	—	14	3
Tomas Johansson (SWE)	1	—	6	0
László Klauz (HUN)	2	4	7	3
Duane Koslowski (USA)	2	4	7	0
Alexander Neumüller (AUT)	2	3	5	
Lubomír David (TCH)	1	2	4	
Fritz Gerdsmeier (FRG)	2	2	1	
Khodr Bechara (LIB)	2	2	0	

==== Group B ====
	Score		CP
Round 1
Hassan El-Hadad (EGY)	2:09	Navind Ramsaran (MRI)	4–0 TF
Farhan Jassim (IRQ)	3:51	Kazuya Deguchi (JPN)	0–3 P1
Rangel Gerovski (BUL)	5:44	Dan Payne (CAN)	3–0 P1
Fabio Valguarnera (ITA)	5:49	Roman Wrocławski (POL)	0–0 D2
Round 2
Hassan El-Hadad (EGY)	4:16	Farhan Jassim (IRQ)	3–0 P1
Navind Ramsaran (MRI)	0:48	Kazuya Deguchi (JPN)	0–4 TF
Rangel Gerovski (BUL)	5:27	Fabio Valguarnera (ITA)	3–0 P1
Dan Payne (CAN)	4:19	Roman Wrocławski (POL)	0–4 TF
Round 3
Hassan El-Hadad (EGY)	2:14	Kazuya Deguchi (JPN)	4–0 TF
Rangel Gerovski (BUL)	4:23	Roman Wrocławski (POL)	3–0 P1
Round 4
Hassan El-Hadad (EGY)	0–5	Rangel Gerovski (BUL)	0–3 PO
Kazuya Deguchi (JPN)		Bye	
Round 5
Kazuya Deguchi (JPN)	0–14	Rangel Gerovski (BUL)	0–3.5 SO
Hassan El-Hadad (EGY)		Bye	

Athlete	L	R	CP	TB
Rangel Gerovski (BUL)	0	—	15.5	6.5
Hassan El-Hadad (EGY)	1	—	11	4
Kazuya Deguchi (JPN)	2	—	7	0
Roman Wrocławski (POL)	2	3	4	
Dan Payne (CAN)	2	2	0	
Fabio Valguarnera (ITA)	2	2	0	
Farhan Jassim (IRQ)	2	2	0	
Navind Ramsaran (MRI)	2	2	0	

=== Finals ===
	Score		CP
7th place match
Duane Koslowski (USA)		Roman Wrocławski (POL)	0–4 FR
5th place match
László Klauz (HUN)	5:00	Kazuya Deguchi (JPN)	3.5–0 PS
Bronze medal match
Tomas Johansson (SWE)	5:04	Hassan El-Hadad (EGY)	3–0 P1
Gold medal match
Aleksandr Karelin (URS)	5–3	Rangel Gerovski (BUL)	3–1 PP

== Final standing ==
Rank	Athlete
1st place, gold medalist(s)	Aleksandr Karelin (URS)
2nd place, silver medalist(s)	Rangel Gerovski (BUL)
3rd place, bronze medalist(s)	Tomas Johansson (SWE)
4	Hassan El-Hadad (EGY)
5	László Klauz (HUN)
6	Kazuya Deguchi (JPN)
7	Roman Wrocławski (POL)
