= Anne Sutton (disambiguation) =

Anne or Ann Sutton may refer to:

- Anne Sutton (1589–1615), British noblewoman
- Anne F. Sutton (1942–2022), British historian
- Ann Sutton (born 1935), British author
- Ann Sutton (equestrian) (born 1958), American Olympic equestrian
