= Rangel Gerovski =

Bulgarian wrestler (1959–2004)

Medal record

Men's Greco-Roman wrestling

Representing Bulgaria

Olympic Games
Silver medal – second place	1988 Seoul	130 kg

World Championships
Bronze medal – third place	Ostia 1990	130 kg
Bronze medal – third place	Varna 1991	130 kg

European Championships
Gold medal – first place	Gothenburg 1981	>100 kg
Silver medal – second place	Poznań 1990	130 kg

Rangel Gerovski (Bulgarian: Рангел Геровски) (15 January 1959 – 26 April 2004) was a Bulgarian wrestler who competed in the 1988 Summer Olympics and in the 1992 Summer Olympics. He won gold at the 1981 European Championships, silver medals at the 1988 Olympics and 1990 European Championships, and bronze at the 1990 World Championships
