= Ralf Bremmer =

German wrestler

Personal information
- Nationality: German
- Born: 21 August 1961 (age 64) Bochum, Germany

Sport
- Sport: Wrestling

Ralf Bremmer (born 21 August 1961) is a German wrestler. He competed in the men's freestyle 130 kg at the 1988 Summer Olympics.
