= Atanas Atanasov (wrestler) =

Bulgarian wrestler

Personal information
- Nationality: Bulgarian
- Born: 4 February 1963 (age 63) Burgas, Bulgaria

Sport
- Sport: Wrestling

Atanas Atanasov (born 4 February 1963) is a Bulgarian wrestler. He competed in the men's freestyle 130 kg at the 1988 Summer Olympics.
