= Fabio Valguarnera =

Italian wrestler

Personal information
- Nationality: Italian
- Born: 7 March 1967 (age 59) Palermo, Italy

Sport
- Sport: Wrestling

Fabio Valguarnera (born 7 March 1967) is an Italian wrestler. He competed in the men's Greco-Roman 130 kg at the 1988 Summer Olympics.
