= Jesús Montesdeoca =

Spanish wrestler (born 1966)

Personal information
- Nationality: Spanish
- Born: 30 October 1966 (age 59)

Sport
- Sport: Wrestling

Jesús Montesdeoca (born 30 October 1966) is a Spanish wrestler. He competed in the men's freestyle 130 kg at the 1988 Summer Olympics.
