= Lubomír David =

Czech wrestler

Personal information
- Nationality: Czech
- Born: 17 February 1964 (age 62)

Sport
- Sport: Wrestling

Lubomír David (born 17 February 1964) is a Czech wrestler. He competed in the men's Greco-Roman 130 kg at the 1988 Summer Olympics.
