= Ham Deog-won =

South Korean wrestler

Personal information
- Nationality: South Korean
- Born: 12 July 1961 (age 65)

Sport
- Sport: Wrestling

Ham Deog-won (born 12 July 1961) is a South Korean wrestler. He competed in the men's freestyle 130 kg at the 1988 Summer Olympics.
