= Miroslav Luberda =

Czech wrestler

Personal information
- Nationality: Czech
- Born: 18 December 1963 (age 62) Vítkovice, Czechoslovakia

Sport
- Sport: Wrestling

Miroslav Luberda (born 18 December 1963) is a Czech wrestler. He competed in the men's freestyle 130 kg at the 1988 Summer Olympics.
