= Kazuya Deguchi =

Japanese wrestler

Personal information
- Nationality: Japanese
- Born: 12 July 1966 (age 60)

Sport
- Sport: Wrestling

Kazuya Deguchi (出口 一也, Deguchi Kazuya; born 12 July 1966) is a Japanese former wrestler. He competed in the men's Greco-Roman 130 kg at the 1988 Summer Olympics.
