= Phyllis Dawson =

American equestrian

Personal information
- Nationality: American
- Born: July 27, 1957 (age 68) Fairfax, Virginia, United States

Sport
- Sport: Equestrian

Phyllis Dawson (born July 27, 1957) is an American equestrian. She competed in two events at the 1988 Summer Olympics, on her Irish Sport Horse, Albany II.
