= Melanie Skillman =

American archer (born 1954)

Personal information
- Full name: Melanie Soltysik Skillman
- Born: September 23, 1954 (age 72) Reading, Pennsylvania, U.S.
Medal record
Women's archery
Representing United States
Olympic Games
Bronze medal – third place	1988 Seoul	Team

Melanie Soltysik Skillman (born September 23, 1954 in Reading, Pennsylvania) is an American archer who was a member of the American squad that won the team bronze medals at the 1988 Summer Olympics. She also competed in the individual event, finishing in 10th place.

== Career ==
Skillman began shooting archery at the age of 10. She went on to become the U.S. Field Archery Champion in 1985 and earned eight Pennsylvania state championship titles. At the 1987 U.S. Nationals, she finished as runner-up, and the following year placed third at the 1988 U.S. Olympic Trials, qualifying her for the Seoul Summer Olympics. There, she contributed to the U.S. team's bronze medal performance. Skillman had previously pursued spots on the U.S. Olympic team at both the 1980 and 1984 trials.

During her Olympic training period, she was employed at Godiva Chocolates in Reading, Pennsylvania. Following her medal ceremony in Seoul, Skillman experienced a memorable moment when the medal became unscrewed as she boarded a bus back to the Olympic Village, sending it rolling across the parking lot.
