= Navind Ramsaran =

Mauritian wrestler (born 1961)

Personal information
- Nationality: Mauritian
- Born: 10 April 1961 (age 65)
- Height: 1.86 m (6 ft 1 in)
- Weight: 115 kg (254 lb)

Sport
- Sport: Wrestling
- Events: Freestyle, Greco-Roman
Medal record
Men's Wrestling
Representing Mauritius
All-Africa Games
Bronze medal – third place	1987 Nairobi	Greco-Roman (130 kg)

Navind Sharma Ramsaran (born 10 April 1961) is a former Mauritian wrestler. He competed in the heavyweight Greco-Roman and freestyle competitions at the 1988 Summer Olympics. Ramsaran won a bronze medal in the 1987 All-Africa Games in the Greco-Roman heavyweight category.

Olympic Games
Preceded by ?	Flagbearer for Mauritius; Seoul 1988	Succeeded by ?
