= Bob Hillery =

American handball player

Personal information
- Full name: Robert J. Hillery
- Nationality: United States
- Born: November 15, 1964 (age 61) Queens, New York

Sport
- Sport: Handball

Robert J. Hillery (born November 15, 1964) is an American former handball player who competed in the 1988 Summer Olympics.
