= Mike Sullivan (handballer) =

American handball player (born 1963)

Michael Sullivan
Personal information
- Full name: Michael Jeffrey Sullivan
- Nationality: United States
- Born: November 14, 1963 (age 62) Queens, New York, U.S.
- Height: 6 ft (1.8 m)

Sport
- Sport: Handball
Medal record
Men's handball
Representing the United States
Pan American Games
Gold medal – first place	1987 Indianapolis	Team

Michael Jeffrey Sullivan (born November 14, 1963, in Queens, New York) is an American former handball player who competed in the 1988 Summer Olympics.
