= Andreas Schröder =

East German wrestler

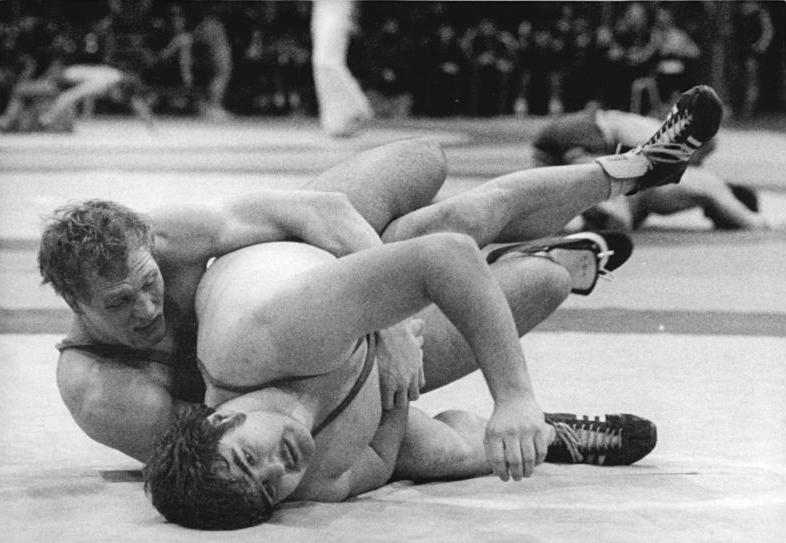
- Andreas Schröder (on top) while wrestling against René Schiekel (at the bottom) in 1985

Medal record

Men's freestyle wrestling

Representing East Germany

Olympic Games
| Bronze medal – third place | 1988 Seoul | 130 kg |

World Championships
| Gold medal – first place | 1991 Varna | 130 kg |

European Championships
| Gold medal – first place | 1992 Kaposvár | 130 kg |
| Gold medal – first place | 1991 Stuttgart | 130 kg |
| Gold medal – first place | 1990 Poznan | 130 kg |
| Gold medal – first place | 1986 Piraeus | 130 kg |

Andreas Schröder (born 8 July 1960 in Jena) is a German former wrestler who competed in the 1988 Summer Olympics and in the 1992 Summer Olympics.
