= Peter Lash =

American handball player

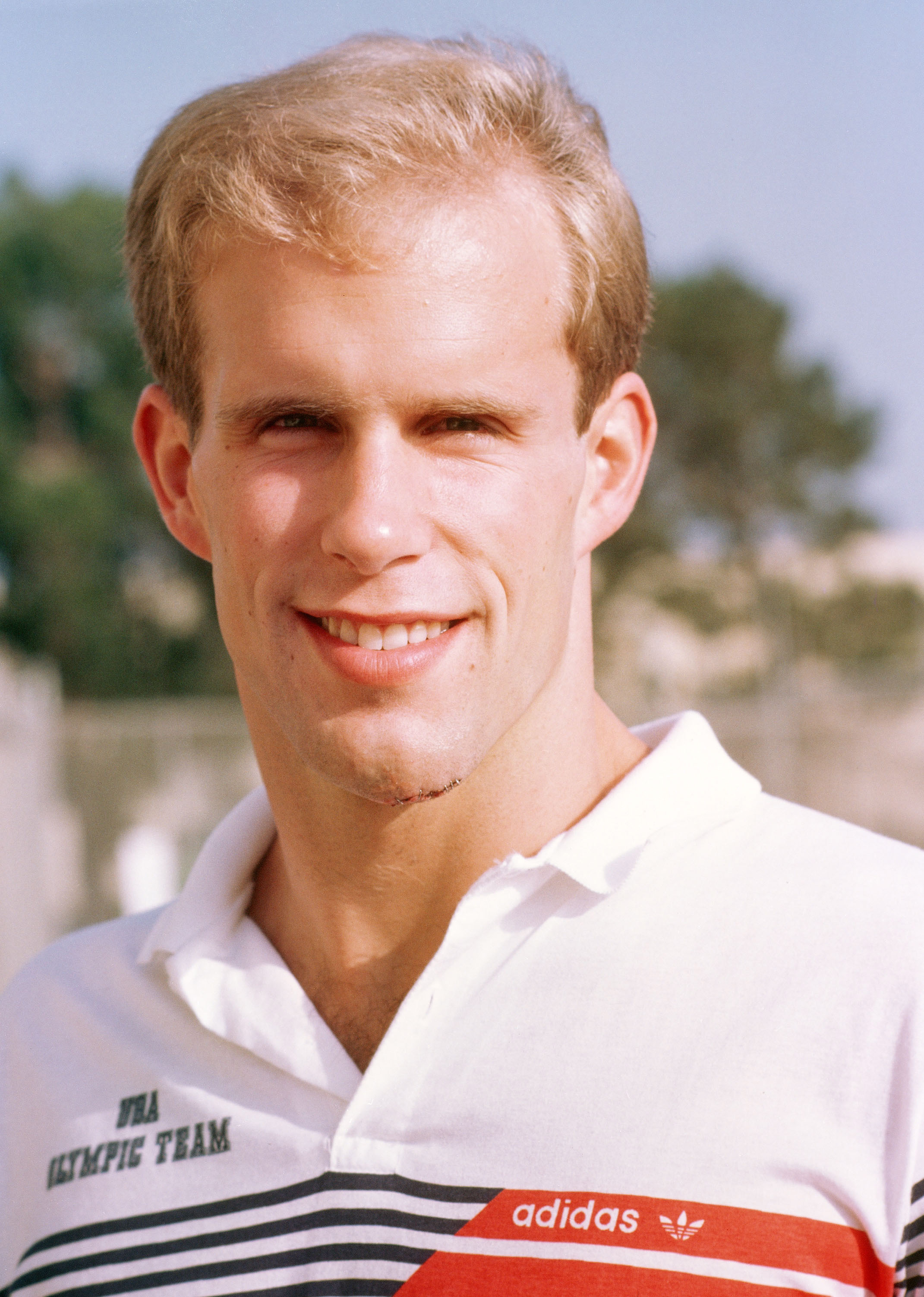
- Lash in 1984

Personal information
- Full name: Peter Waller Lash Jr.
- Nationality: United States
- Born: August 11, 1959 (age 67) Anchorage, Alaska, U.S.
- Height: 6 ft 4 in (1.93 m)

Sport
- Sport: Handball
Medal record
Men's handball
Representing the United States
Pan American Games
Gold medal – first place	1987 Indianapolis	Team

Peter Waller Lash Jr. (born August 11, 1959) is an American former handball player who competed in the 1984 Summer Olympics and in the 1988 Summer Olympics.
