= Roman Wrocławski =

Polish wrestler

Personal information
- Nationality: Polish
- Born: 13 July 1955 (age 71) Piotrków Trybunalski, Poland

Sport
- Sport: Wrestling
Medal record
Representing Poland
World Championships
Gold medal – first place	1982 Katowice	-100 kg
Bronze medal – third place	1981 Oslo	-100 kg
Summer Universiade
Bronze medal – third place	1981 Bucharest	-100 kg

Roman Dominik Wrocławski (born 13 July 1955) is a Polish wrestler. He competed in the men's Greco-Roman 130 kg at the 1988 Summer Olympics.
