= Khodr Bechara =

Lebanese wrestler

Personal information
- Nationality: Lebanese
- Born: 13 April 1965 (age 61)

Sport
- Sport: Wrestling

Khodr Bechara (born 13 April 1965) is a Lebanese wrestler. He competed in the men's Greco-Roman 130 kg at the 1988 Summer Olympics.
