= Alexander Neumüller =

Austrian wrestler

Personal information
- Nationality: Austrian
- Born: 2 March 1966 (age 60) Salzburg, Austria

Sport
- Sport: Wrestling

Alexander Neumüller (born 2 March 1966) is an Austrian wrestler. He competed in the men's Greco-Roman 130 kg at the 1988 Summer Olympics.
