= Duane Koslowski =

American wrestler (1959–2025)

Personal information
- Born: August 16, 1959 Watertown, South Dakota, U.S.
- Died: February 2, 2025 (aged 65)

Sport
- Country: United States
- Sport: Wrestling
- Weight class: 130 kg
- Events: Greco-Roman; Folkstyle
- College team: Minnesota-Morris
- Club: Minnesota Wrestling Club
- Team: USA
Medal record
Men's Greco-Roman wrestling
Representing the United States
Pan American Games
Gold medal – first place	1987 Indianapolis	130 kg
Collegiate Wrestling
Representing Minnesota-Morris
NCAA Division III Championships
Gold medal – first place	1981 University Heights	Heavyweight

Duane Koslowski (August 16, 1959 – February 2, 2025) was an American wrestler. He competed in the men's Greco-Roman 130 kg at the 1988 Summer Olympics. His twin brother, Dennis Koslowski, wrestled with him at Minnesota-Morris and was a two-time Olympic medalist in Greco-Roman wrestling. Duane Koslowski died on February 2, 2025, at the age of 65.
