= Belinda Baudin =

American equestrian

Personal information
- Nationality: American
- Born: June 13, 1955 (age 70) Wellington, New Zealand

Sport
- Sport: Equestrian

Belinda Baudin (born June 13, 1955) is an American equestrian. She competed in two events at the 1988 Summer Olympics.
