= László Klauz =

Hungarian wrestler (1961–2013)

Personal information
- Nationality: Hungarian
- Born: 6 November 1961 Győr, Hungary
- Died: 28 March 2013 (aged 51) Budafok
- Height: 194 cm (6 ft 4 in)

Sport
- Sport: Wrestling
Medal record
Representing Hungary
Men's Greco-Roman wrestling
World Championships
Silver medal – second place	1989 Martigny	130 kg
Bronze medal – third place	1986 Budapest	130 kg
World Cup
Silver medal – second place	Oak Lawns 1986	130 kg
Silver medal – second place	Heinola 1993	130 kg

László Klauz (6 November 1961 – 28 March 2013) was a Hungarian wrestler. He competed at the 1988 Summer Olympics and the 1992 Summer Olympics. He won silver medal at the 1989 World Wrestling Championships and bronze medal at the 1986 World Wrestling Championships.

== Major results ==
Year	Tournament	Venue	Result	Event
1986	World Championships	Budapest, Hungary	3rd	Greco-Roman 130 kg
1987	European Championships	Tampere, Finland	6th	Greco-Roman 130 kg
1988	Olympic Games	Seoul, South Korea	4th	Freestyle 130 kg
1988	Olympic Games	Seoul, South Korea	5th	Greco-Roman 130 kg
1989	World Championships	Martigny, Switzerland	10th	Freestyle 130 kg
1989	World Championships	Martigny, Switzerland	2nd	Greco-Roman 130 kg
1990	European Championships	Poznań, Poland	4th	Greco-Roman 130 kg
1990	World Championships	Tokyo, Japan	6th	Freestyle 130 kg
1990	World Championships	Ostia, Italy	5th	Greco-Roman 130 kg
1991	World Championships	Varna, Bulgaria	4th	Greco-Roman 130 kg
1992	Olympic Games	Barcelona, Spain	4th	Greco-Roman 130 kg
1993	World Championships	Stockholm, Sweden	5th	Greco-Roman 130 kg
