= Dan Payne (Canadian football) =

Canadian football player (born 1966)

Profile
- Position: Offensive tackle

Personal information
- Born: June 7, 1966 (age 60); New Westminster, British Columbia, Canada
- Listed height: 6 ft 7 in (2.01 m)
- Listed weight: 300 lb (136 kg)

Career information
- College: Simon Fraser University (Purdue University)
- CFL draft: 1989: 2nd round, 9th overall pick

Career history
- 1989: Saskatchewan Roughriders
- 1990: BC Lions
- 1992: Hamilton Tiger-Cats
- 1993–1995: Saskatchewan Roughriders
- 1996: BC Lions
- 1996–1997: Toronto Argonauts
- 1998–2003: BC Lions

Awards and highlights
- 4× Grey Cup champion (1989, 1996, 1997, 2000)

Dan Payne
Medal record
Men's Wrestling
Representing Canada
Pan American Games
Bronze medal – third place	1987 Indianapolis	Greco-Roman (130 kg)
Bronze medal – third place	1987 Indianapolis	Freestyle (130 kg)

Dan Payne (born June 7, 1966) is a Canadian former professional football offensive lineman who played fourteen seasons in the Canadian Football League (CFL) for four teams, mostly at right guard. He attended Purdue University on a full football/wrestling scholarship before transferring to Simon Fraser University. He played football and wrestled at Simon Fraser University. He was a member of four Grey Cup-winning teams: the Saskatchewan Roughriders (1989), the Toronto Argonauts (1996, 1997), and the B.C. Lions (2000). During his career, he also played for Hamilton.

Payne was raised in Port Coquitlam, British Columbia. Prior to his football career, he competed as an amateur wrestler, winning two NAIA national championships. In international competition, he won bronze at the 1987 Pan American Games in freestyle and Greco-Roman before representing Canada in the 1988 Seoul Olympics, where he competed in both the freestyle (6th place) and Greco-Roman (13th place) competitions in the 130 kg division.
