= Ann Sutton (equestrian) =

American equestrian (born 1958)

Personal information
- Full name: Ann Hardaway Sutton
- Born: October 23, 1958 (age 67) Columbus, Georgia, United States

Sport
- Sport: Equestrian

Ann Hardaway Sutton (born October 23, 1958) is an American equestrian. She competed in two events at the 1988 Summer Olympics.
