= Hassan El-Haddad =

Egyptian wrestler

Personal information
- Nationality: Egyptian
- Born: 5 July 1957
- Died: 30 September 2017 (aged 60); Cairo, Egypt

Sport
- Sport: Wrestling

Hassan El-Haddad (5 July 1957 – 30 September 2017) was an Egyptian wrestler. He competed at the 1984 Summer Olympics and the 1988 Summer Olympics.
