= Handball at the 1988 Summer Olympics – Men's tournament =

1988 Men's Olympic handball tournament
Tournament details
- Host country: South Korea
- Venues: 2 (in 2 host cities)
- Dates: 20 September – 1 October 1988
- Teams: 12

Final positions
- Champions: Soviet Union (2nd title)
- Runners-up: South Korea
- Third place: Yugoslavia
- Fourth place: Hungary

Tournament statistics
- Matches played: 36
- Goals scored: 1,556 (43.22 per match)
- Top scorers: (South Korea) Kang Jae-won (49 goals)

The men's tournament was one of two handball tournaments at the 1988 Summer Olympics. It was the sixth appearance of a men's handball tournament as a medal event at the Olympic Games.

== Qualification ==
Mean of qualification	Date	Host	Vacancies	Qualified
Host nation	30 September 1981	(West Germany) Baden-Baden	1	South Korea
1986 World Championship	25 February – 8 March 1986	Switzerland	6	Yugoslavia; Hungary; East Germany; Sweden; Spain; Iceland
1987 World Championship Group B	17–28 February 1987	Italy	2	Soviet Union; Czechoslovakia
1987 African Championship	3–12 July 1987	(Morocco) Rabat	1	Algeria
1987 Pan American Games	9–16 August 1987	(United States) Indianapolis	1	United States
1987 Asian Championship	20–29 August 1987	(Jordan) Amman	1	Japan
Total			12	

== Preliminary round ==
=== Group A ===
Pos	Team	Pld	W	D	L	GF	GA	GD	Pts	Qualification
1	Soviet Union	5	5	0	0	130	82	+48	10	Gold medal game
2	Yugoslavia	5	3	1	1	116	109	+7	7	Bronze medal game
3	Sweden	5	3	0	2	106	91	+15	6	Fifth place game
4	Iceland	5	2	1	2	96	102	−6	5	Seventh place game
5	Algeria	5	1	0	4	89	109	−20	2	Ninth place game
6	United States	5	0	0	5	81	125	−44	0	Eleventh place game

20 September 1988; 10:00	Yugoslavia	18–24	Soviet Union	Suwon Gymnasium, Suwon; Referees: Hofmann, Prause (FRG)
20 September 1988; 10:00	Vujović 8	(7–10)	Tyumentsev 6	Suwon Gymnasium, Suwon; Referees: Hofmann, Prause (FRG)
20 September 1988; 10:00	3× (yellow card) 4× (suspension)		2× (yellow card) 5× (suspension)	Suwon Gymnasium, Suwon; Referees: Hofmann, Prause (FRG)

20 September 1988; 14:00	Sweden	21–18	Algeria	Suwon Gymnasium, Suwon; Referees: Lelong, Tancrez (FRA)
20 September 1988; 14:00	Hajas, Järphag 4	(14–9)	Seghir 5	Suwon Gymnasium, Suwon; Referees: Lelong, Tancrez (FRA)
20 September 1988; 14:00	2× (yellow card) 4× (suspension)		3× (yellow card) 6× (suspension)	Suwon Gymnasium, Suwon; Referees: Lelong, Tancrez (FRA)

20 September 1988; 18:00	Iceland	22–15	United States	Suwon Gymnasium, Suwon; Referees: Rauchfuß, Buchda (GDR)
20 September 1988; 18:00	Arason 8	(8–8)	Lash 4	Suwon Gymnasium, Suwon; Referees: Rauchfuß, Buchda (GDR)
20 September 1988; 18:00	3× (yellow card) 2× (suspension)		3× (yellow card) 5× (suspension)	Suwon Gymnasium, Suwon; Referees: Rauchfuß, Buchda (GDR)

22 September 1988; 10:00	Yugoslavia	31–23	United States	Suwon Gymnasium, Suwon; Referees: Lee, Park (KOR)
22 September 1988; 10:00	Vujović 7	(17–11)	Goss 7	Suwon Gymnasium, Suwon; Referees: Lee, Park (KOR)
22 September 1988; 10:00	2× (yellow card) 3× (suspension)		1× (yellow card) 5× (suspension)	Suwon Gymnasium, Suwon; Referees: Lee, Park (KOR)

22 September 1988; 14:00	Sweden	18–22	Soviet Union	Suwon Gymnasium, Suwon; Referees: Marin, Şerban (ROU)
22 September 1988; 14:00	Hajas 6	(7–11)	Karshakevich 9	Suwon Gymnasium, Suwon; Referees: Marin, Şerban (ROU)
22 September 1988; 14:00	3× (yellow card) 3× (suspension)		2× (yellow card) 7× (suspension)	Suwon Gymnasium, Suwon; Referees: Marin, Şerban (ROU)

22 September 1988; 18:00	Iceland	22–16	Algeria	Suwon Gymnasium, Suwon; Referees: Zaworotny, Brosio (ARG)
22 September 1988; 18:00	Arason 8	(11–8)	Seghir 4	Suwon Gymnasium, Suwon; Referees: Zaworotny, Brosio (ARG)
22 September 1988; 18:00	2× (yellow card) 6× (suspension)		2× (yellow card) 6× (suspension)	Suwon Gymnasium, Suwon; Referees: Zaworotny, Brosio (ARG)

24 September 1988; 10:00	Yugoslavia	23–22	Algeria	Suwon Gymnasium, Suwon; Referees: Rauchfuß, Buchda (GDR)
24 September 1988; 10:00	Smajlagić 7	(10–11)	three players 4	Suwon Gymnasium, Suwon; Referees: Rauchfuß, Buchda (GDR)
24 September 1988; 10:00	3× (yellow card) 7× (suspension)		3× (yellow card) 3× (suspension)	Suwon Gymnasium, Suwon; Referees: Rauchfuß, Buchda (GDR)

24 September 1988; 14:00	Sweden	20–14	Iceland	Suwon Gymnasium, Suwon; Referees: Sjong, Ludvigsen (NOR)
24 September 1988; 14:00	Carlén, Hajas 5	(12–6)	three players 3	Suwon Gymnasium, Suwon; Referees: Sjong, Ludvigsen (NOR)
24 September 1988; 14:00	2× (yellow card) 3× (suspension)		2× (yellow card) 4× (suspension)	Suwon Gymnasium, Suwon; Referees: Sjong, Ludvigsen (NOR)

24 September 1988; 18:00	Soviet Union	26–14	United States	Suwon Gymnasium, Suwon; Referees: Haak, Koppe (NED)
24 September 1988; 18:00	Tyumentsev 6	(10–5)	Goss 5	Suwon Gymnasium, Suwon; Referees: Haak, Koppe (NED)
24 September 1988; 18:00	2× (yellow card) 3× (suspension)		3× (yellow card) 3× (suspension)	Suwon Gymnasium, Suwon; Referees: Haak, Koppe (NED)

26 September 1988; 10:00	Yugoslavia	19–19	Iceland	Suwon Gymnasium, Suwon; Referees: Haak, Koppe (NED)
26 September 1988; 10:00	Portner 6	(8–10)	Gíslason, Þráinsson 5	Suwon Gymnasium, Suwon; Referees: Haak, Koppe (NED)
26 September 1988; 10:00	2× (yellow card) 11× (suspension)		3× (yellow card) 8× (suspension)	Suwon Gymnasium, Suwon; Referees: Haak, Koppe (NED)

26 September 1988; 14:00	Sweden	26–12	United States	Suwon Gymnasium, Suwon; Referees: Brosio, Zaworotny (ARG)
26 September 1988; 14:00	B. Jilsén 6	(11–6)	Lash, Sullivan 4	Suwon Gymnasium, Suwon; Referees: Brosio, Zaworotny (ARG)
26 September 1988; 14:00	2× (yellow card) 1× (suspension)		2× (yellow card) 5× (suspension)	Suwon Gymnasium, Suwon; Referees: Brosio, Zaworotny (ARG)

26 September 1988; 18:00	Soviet Union	26–13	Algeria	Suwon Gymnasium, Suwon; Referees: Lee, Park (KOR)
26 September 1988; 18:00	Gopin, Nesterov 4	(13–5)	Bouanik 5	Suwon Gymnasium, Suwon; Referees: Lee, Park (KOR)
26 September 1988; 18:00	2× (yellow card) 2× (suspension)		1× (yellow card) 4× (suspension)	Suwon Gymnasium, Suwon; Referees: Lee, Park (KOR)

28 September 1988; 10:00	United States	17–20	Algeria	Suwon Gymnasium, Suwon; Referees: Lelong, Tancrez (FRA)
28 September 1988; 10:00	Hillery, Lash 5	(8–10)	three players 3	Suwon Gymnasium, Suwon; Referees: Lelong, Tancrez (FRA)
28 September 1988; 10:00	3× (yellow card) 4× (suspension)		3× (yellow card) 2× (suspension)	Suwon Gymnasium, Suwon; Referees: Lelong, Tancrez (FRA)

28 September 1988; 14:00	Iceland	19–32	Soviet Union	Suwon Gymnasium, Suwon; Referees: Rauchfuß, Buchda (GDR)
28 September 1988; 14:00	Gíslason 6	(8–15)	Tuchkin 11	Suwon Gymnasium, Suwon; Referees: Rauchfuß, Buchda (GDR)
28 September 1988; 14:00	3× (yellow card) 2× (suspension)		3× (yellow card) 7× (suspension)	Suwon Gymnasium, Suwon; Referees: Rauchfuß, Buchda (GDR)

28 September 1988; 18:00	Yugoslavia	25–21	Sweden	Suwon Gymnasium, Suwon; Referees: Marin, Şerban (ROU)
28 September 1988; 18:00	Puc 5	(14–10)	Carlén, B. Jilsén 5	Suwon Gymnasium, Suwon; Referees: Marin, Şerban (ROU)
28 September 1988; 18:00	2× (yellow card) 1× (suspension)		3× (yellow card) 2× (suspension)	Suwon Gymnasium, Suwon; Referees: Marin, Şerban (ROU)

=== Group B ===
Pos	Team	Pld	W	D	L	GF	GA	GD	Pts	Qualification
1	South Korea (H)	5	4	0	1	127	117	+10	8	Gold medal game
2	Hungary	5	3	0	2	102	93	+9	6 (Note: 25% rule: Hungary +6 GD, 80 GS; Czechoslovakia +2 GD, 88 GS; East Germany +2 GD, 84 GS)	Bronze medal game
3	Czechoslovakia	5	3	0	2	109	103	+6	6	Fifth place game
4	East Germany	5	3	0	2	109	100	+9	6	Seventh place game
5	Spain	5	2	0	3	101	106	−5	4	Ninth place game
6	Japan	5	0	0	5	97	126	−29	0	Eleventh place game

(H) Hosts
Notes:

20 September 1988; 11:30	Hungary	20–22	South Korea	Suwon Gymnasium, Suwon; Referees: Christensen, Jørgensen (DEN)
20 September 1988; 11:30	P. Kovács 10	(9–11)	Kang 7	Suwon Gymnasium, Suwon; Referees: Christensen, Jørgensen (DEN)
20 September 1988; 11:30	2× (yellow card) 5× (suspension)		3× (yellow card) 4× (suspension) 1× (red card)	Suwon Gymnasium, Suwon; Referees: Christensen, Jørgensen (DEN)

20 September 1988; 15:30	East Germany	25–18	Japan	Suwon Gymnasium, Suwon; Referees: Haak, Koppe (NED)
20 September 1988; 15:30	Borchardt, Wahl 6	(14–10)	Miyashita 6	Suwon Gymnasium, Suwon; Referees: Haak, Koppe (NED)
20 September 1988; 15:30	2× (yellow card) 4× (suspension)		3× (yellow card) 4× (suspension)	Suwon Gymnasium, Suwon; Referees: Haak, Koppe (NED)

20 September 1988; 19:30	Spain	17–20	Czechoslovakia	Suwon Gymnasium, Suwon; Referees: Wester, Blademo (SWE)
20 September 1988; 19:30	Serrano 7	(5–10)	Bartek 6	Suwon Gymnasium, Suwon; Referees: Wester, Blademo (SWE)
20 September 1988; 19:30	2× (yellow card) 4× (suspension)		2× (yellow card) 7× (suspension) 2× (red card)	Suwon Gymnasium, Suwon; Referees: Wester, Blademo (SWE)

22 September 1988; 11:30	Hungary	16–19	Czechoslovakia	Suwon Gymnasium, Suwon; Referees: Guterman, Taranuhin (URS)
22 September 1988; 11:30	Iváncsik 6	(6–12)	Kotrč 7	Suwon Gymnasium, Suwon; Referees: Guterman, Taranuhin (URS)
22 September 1988; 11:30	3× (yellow card) 3× (suspension)		2× (yellow card) 4× (suspension)	Suwon Gymnasium, Suwon; Referees: Guterman, Taranuhin (URS)

22 September 1988; 15:30	East Germany	22–23	South Korea	Suwon Gymnasium, Suwon; Referees: Jug, Jeglič (YUG)
22 September 1988; 15:30	Borchardt 8	(13–9)	Kang 9	Suwon Gymnasium, Suwon; Referees: Jug, Jeglič (YUG)
22 September 1988; 15:30	3× (yellow card) 4× (suspension)		1× (yellow card) 3× (suspension)	Suwon Gymnasium, Suwon; Referees: Jug, Jeglič (YUG)

22 September 1988; 19:30	Spain	25–19	Japan	Suwon Gymnasium, Suwon; Referees: Sjong, Ludvigsen (NOR)
22 September 1988; 19:30	Muñoz 8	(13–5)	Yamamura 6	Suwon Gymnasium, Suwon; Referees: Sjong, Ludvigsen (NOR)
22 September 1988; 19:30	2× (yellow card) 5× (suspension)		2× (yellow card) 6× (suspension) 1× (red card)	Suwon Gymnasium, Suwon; Referees: Sjong, Ludvigsen (NOR)

24 September 1988; 11:30	Hungary	22–19	Japan	Suwon Gymnasium, Suwon; Referees: Wester, Blademo (SWE)
24 September 1988; 11:30	Marosi 11	(10–11)	Tamamura 13	Suwon Gymnasium, Suwon; Referees: Wester, Blademo (SWE)
24 September 1988; 11:30	2× (yellow card) 6× (suspension)		1× (yellow card) 9× (suspension) 1× (red card)	Suwon Gymnasium, Suwon; Referees: Wester, Blademo (SWE)

24 September 1988; 15:30	East Germany	21–20	Spain	Suwon Gymnasium, Suwon; Referees: Christensen, Jørgensen (DEN)
24 September 1988; 15:30	Borchardt 8	(11–8)	Muñoz 6	Suwon Gymnasium, Suwon; Referees: Christensen, Jørgensen (DEN)
24 September 1988; 15:30	2× (yellow card) 4× (suspension)		2× (yellow card) 5× (suspension) 1× (red card)	Suwon Gymnasium, Suwon; Referees: Christensen, Jørgensen (DEN)

24 September 1988; 19:30	South Korea	29–28	Czechoslovakia	Suwon Gymnasium, Suwon; Referees: Hofmann, Prause (FRG)
24 September 1988; 19:30	Lee 9	(15–12)	Sovadina 10	Suwon Gymnasium, Suwon; Referees: Hofmann, Prause (FRG)
24 September 1988; 19:30	3× (yellow card) 5× (suspension)		3× (yellow card) 7× (suspension)	Suwon Gymnasium, Suwon; Referees: Hofmann, Prause (FRG)

26 September 1988; 11:30	Hungary	26–16	Spain	Suwon Gymnasium, Suwon; Referees: Jug, Jeglič (YUG)
26 September 1988; 11:30	Marosi 8	(14–8)	Muñoz 5	Suwon Gymnasium, Suwon; Referees: Jug, Jeglič (YUG)
26 September 1988; 11:30	2× (yellow card) 5× (suspension)		2× (yellow card) 5× (suspension)	Suwon Gymnasium, Suwon; Referees: Jug, Jeglič (YUG)

26 September 1988; 15:30	East Germany	24–21	Czechoslovakia	Suwon Gymnasium, Suwon; Referees: Marin, Şerban (ROU)
26 September 1988; 15:30	Borchardt 9	(11–9)	Bajgar, Bartek 5	Suwon Gymnasium, Suwon; Referees: Marin, Şerban (ROU)
26 September 1988; 15:30	3× (yellow card) 8× (suspension)		2× (yellow card) 6× (suspension) 1× (red card)	Suwon Gymnasium, Suwon; Referees: Marin, Şerban (ROU)

26 September 1988; 19:30	South Korea	33–24	Japan	Suwon Gymnasium, Suwon; Referees: Guterman, Taranuhin (URS)
26 September 1988; 19:30	Kang 10	(18–11)	Yamamura 7	Suwon Gymnasium, Suwon; Referees: Guterman, Taranuhin (URS)
26 September 1988; 19:30	6× (suspension)		2× (yellow card) 6× (suspension)	Suwon Gymnasium, Suwon; Referees: Guterman, Taranuhin (URS)

28 September 1988; 11:30	Czechoslovakia	21–17	Japan	Suwon Gymnasium, Suwon; Referees: Jug, Jeglič (YUG)
28 September 1988; 11:30	Sovadina 6	(13–7)	Tamamura, Yamamura 5	Suwon Gymnasium, Suwon; Referees: Jug, Jeglič (YUG)
28 September 1988; 11:30	2× (yellow card) 5× (suspension)		2× (yellow card) 2× (suspension)	Suwon Gymnasium, Suwon; Referees: Jug, Jeglič (YUG)

28 September 1988; 15:30	Spain	23–20	South Korea	Suwon Gymnasium, Suwon; Referees: Wester, Blademo (SWE)
28 September 1988; 15:30	Serrano 8	(10–9)	Lee 8	Suwon Gymnasium, Suwon; Referees: Wester, Blademo (SWE)
28 September 1988; 15:30	2× (yellow card) 2× (suspension)		2× (yellow card) 1× (suspension)	Suwon Gymnasium, Suwon; Referees: Wester, Blademo (SWE)

28 September 1988; 19:30	Hungary	18–17	East Germany	Suwon Gymnasium, Suwon; Referees: Guterman, Taranuhin (URS)
28 September 1988; 19:30	Iváncsik 8	(7–9)	Hahn, Schneider 4	Suwon Gymnasium, Suwon; Referees: Guterman, Taranuhin (URS)
28 September 1988; 19:30	3× (yellow card) 6× (suspension)		2× (yellow card) 6× (suspension)	Suwon Gymnasium, Suwon; Referees: Guterman, Taranuhin (URS)

== Final round ==
=== Eleventh place game ===
30 September 1988; 10:00	United States	21–24	Japan	Suwon Gymnasium, Suwon; Referees: Brosio, Zaworotny (ARG)
30 September 1988; 10:00	Goss 8	(11–8)	Tamamura 10	Suwon Gymnasium, Suwon; Referees: Brosio, Zaworotny (ARG)
30 September 1988; 10:00	2× (yellow card) 4× (suspension)		2× (yellow card) 3× (suspension)	Suwon Gymnasium, Suwon; Referees: Brosio, Zaworotny (ARG)

=== Ninth place game ===
30 September 1988; 11:30	Algeria	15–21	Spain	Suwon Gymnasium, Suwon; Referees: Ludvigsen, Sjong (NOR)
30 September 1988; 11:30	Seghir 5	(6–11)	Marín 4	Suwon Gymnasium, Suwon; Referees: Ludvigsen, Sjong (NOR)
30 September 1988; 11:30			2× (yellow card) 3× (suspension)	Suwon Gymnasium, Suwon; Referees: Ludvigsen, Sjong (NOR)

=== Seventh place game ===
30 September 1988
14:00
Iceland
29–31 (ET)
East Germany
Suwon Gymnasium, Suwon
Referees: Christensen, Jørgensen (DEN)
Arason 9
(13–12)
Borchardt 8
2× (yellow card) 7× (suspension)

2× (yellow card) 7× (suspension)

FT: 23–23 ET: 2–2, 3–3 Pen: 1–3

=== Fifth place game ===
30 September 1988; 15:30	Sweden	27–18	Czechoslovakia	Suwon Gymnasium, Suwon; Referees: Lelong, Tancrez (FRA)
30 September 1988; 15:30	Järphag 8	(14–8)	Bartek 5	Suwon Gymnasium, Suwon; Referees: Lelong, Tancrez (FRA)
30 September 1988; 15:30	2× (yellow card) 4× (suspension)		2× (yellow card) 4× (suspension) 1× (red card)	Suwon Gymnasium, Suwon; Referees: Lelong, Tancrez (FRA)

=== Bronze medal game ===
1 October 1988; 15:00	Yugoslavia	27–23	Hungary	Olympic Gymnastics Arena, Seoul; Referees: Christensen, Jørgensen (DEN)
1 October 1988; 15:00	Portner, Vujović 7	(12–13)	Iváncsik, P. Kovács 6	Olympic Gymnastics Arena, Seoul; Referees: Christensen, Jørgensen (DEN)
1 October 1988; 15:00	2× (yellow card) 6× (suspension) 1× (red card)		2× (yellow card) 4× (suspension)	Olympic Gymnastics Arena, Seoul; Referees: Christensen, Jørgensen (DEN)

=== Gold medal game ===
1 October 1988; 17:00	Soviet Union	32–25	South Korea	Olympic Gymnastics Arena, Seoul; Referees: Hofmann, Prause (FRG)
1 October 1988; 17:00	Rymanov 7	(17–11)	Kang 10	Olympic Gymnastics Arena, Seoul; Referees: Hofmann, Prause (FRG)
1 October 1988; 17:00	3× (yellow card) 3× (suspension)		2× (yellow card) 1× (suspension)	Olympic Gymnastics Arena, Seoul; Referees: Hofmann, Prause (FRG)

== Rankings and statistics ==
=== Final ranking ===
Rank	Team
1st place, gold medalist(s)	Soviet Union
2nd place, silver medalist(s)	South Korea
3rd place, bronze medalist(s)	Yugoslavia
4	Hungary
5	Sweden
6	Czechoslovakia
7	East Germany
8	Iceland
9	Spain
10	Algeria
11	Japan
12	United States

=== Top goalscorers ===
Rank	Name	Goals
1	(South Korea) Kang Jae-won	49
2	(East Germany) Rüdiger Borchardt	42
3	(Japan) Kenji Tamamura	34
4	(Iceland) Kristján Arason	33
5	(Hungary) Mihály Iváncsik	31
5	(South Korea) Lee Sang-hyo	31
5	(Socialist Federal Republic of Yugoslavia) Zlatko Portner	31
8	(Hungary) László Marosi	30
9	(Soviet Union) Aleksandr Tuchkin	29
9	(Socialist Federal Republic of Yugoslavia) Veselin Vujović	29
