= Algeria at the 1988 Summer Olympics =

- IOC code: ALG
- NOC: Algerian Olympic Committee

in Seoul
- Competitors: 44 in 7 sports
- Flag bearer: Noureddine Tadjine
- Medals: Gold 0 Silver 0 Bronze 0 Total 0

Summer Olympics appearances (overview)
- 1964; 1968; 1972; 1976; 1980; 1984; 1988; 1992; 1996; 2000; 2004; 2008; 2012; 2016; 2020; 2024; 2028

Other related appearances
- France (1896–1960)

Algeria competed at the 1988 Summer Olympics in Seoul, South Korea. 44 competitors, 40 men and 4 women, took part in 29 events in 7 sports.

== Competitors ==
The following is the list of number of competitors in the Games.

Sport	Men	Women	Total
Athletics	11	2	13
Boxing	6	–	6
Cycling	2	0	2
Handball	14	0	14
Judo	5	1	6
Tennis	0	1	1
Weightlifting	2	–	0
Total	40	4	44

== Athletics ==
Men
Track and road events

Athlete	Event	Heat Round 1		Heat Round 2		Semifinal		Final	
Athlete	Event	Time	Rank	Time	Rank	Time	Rank	Time	Rank
Moustafa Kamel Salmi	100 metres	11.08	86	Did not advance					
Moustafa Kamel Salmi	200 metres	21.24	28 q	21.26	30	Did not advance			
Réda Abdenouz	800 metres	1:47.67	16 q	1:46.97	16 Q	1:45.95	13	Did not advance	
Ahmed Bel Kessam	800 metres	1:47.96	21 q	1:46.93	21	Did not advance			
Rachid Kram	1500 metres	3:39.90	6 q	—N/a		3:41.39	18	Did not advance	
Allaoua Khellil	Marathon	—N/a						2:21:12	35
Noureddine Tadjine	110 metres hurdles	14.36	28 Q	14.35	28	Did not advance			
Azzedine Brahmi	3000 metres steeplechase	8:35.59	10 Q	—N/a		8:16.54	4 Q	8:26.68	13
Mohamed Bouhalla	20 kilometres walk	—N/a						1:27:10	34
Abdel Wahab Ferguene	20 kilometres walk	—N/a						1:26:33	32

Field events

Athlete	Event	Qualification		Final	
Athlete	Event	Distance	Position	Distance	Position
Lotfi Khaïda	Long jump	7.10	29	Did not advance	
Lotfi Khaïda	Triple jump	15.68	30	Did not advance	
Hakim Toumi	Hammer throw	65.78	26	Did not advance	

Women
Track and road events

Athlete	Event	Heat Round 1		Heat Round 2		Semifinal		Final	
Athlete	Event	Time	Rank	Time	Rank	Time	Rank	Time	Rank
Hassiba Boulmerka	800 metres	2:03.33	18	—N/a		Did not advance			
Hassiba Boulmerka	1500 metres	4:08.33	14	—N/a				Did not advance	

== Boxing ==
Athlete	Event	Round of 64	Round of 32	Round of 16	Quarterfinals	Semifinals	Final	
Athlete	Event	Opposition Result	Opposition Result	Opposition Result	Opposition Result	Opposition Result	Opposition Result	Rank
Yacine Sheikh	Light flyweight	Martínez (ESA); L 0–5	Did not advance					
Benaissa Abed	Flyweight	Bye	Moukrim (MAR); W 3–2	Nsubuga (UGA); W 3–2	Tews (GDR); L 0–5	Did not advance		
Slimane Zengli	Bantamweight	Gomes (ANG); W 5–0	Santana (BRA); W 5–0	Artemyev (URS); L 0–5	Did not advance			
Azzedine Saïd	Lightweight	Mbao (ZAM); W' KO	Kubuitsile (BOT); W RSC R1	Hegazi (EGY); L 0–5	Did not advance			
Noureddine Meziane	Light middleweight	Hussain (PAK); L KO	Did not advance					
Ahmed Dine	Middleweight	Bye	Füzesy (HUN); L 0–5	Did not advance				

== Cycling ==
Two male cyclists represented Algeria in 1988.

=== Road ===
Men

Athlete	Event	Time	Rank
Sebti Benzine	Road race	4:43:15	96
Mohamed Mir	Road race	4:32:56	39

== Handball ==
The Algerians elected to send only a men's team to the 1988 Olympics, with 15 members. One man, Mohamed Machou, did not start.

They finished the event with a final record of 1 win, 0 ties, and 5 losses, scoring 104 goals while letting in 130 for a point differential of -26. They made 198 attempts on goal, netting them a 52.5% success rate. They were given 12 yellow cards and 21 2-minute suspensions. They played a notably clean series of games, garnering not a single red card or disqualification. They were coached by Mohamed Lamine Aziz Derouaz.

Summary

Key:

- FT – After full time.
- P – Match decided by penalty-shootout.

Team	Event	Group stage						Final / BM	
Team	Event	Opposition Score	Opposition Score	Opposition Score	Opposition Score	Opposition Score	Rank	Opposition Score	Rank
Algeria men's	Men's tournament	Sweden; L 18–21	Iceland; L 16–22	Yugoslavia; L 22–23	Soviet Union; L 13–26	United States; W 20–17	5	Spain; L 15–21	10

Team roster

- Brahim Bourdrali - Played 6 games, scored 12 times.
- Abdelhak Bouhalissa - Played 3 games, scored 4 times.
- Omar Azzeb - Played 3 games, scored 1 time.
- Ben Ali Beghouach - Played 6 games, scored 7 times.
- Makhlouf Ait Hocine - Played 5 games, scored 15 times.
- Salah Bouchekriou - Plated 6 games, scored 7 times.
- Ahcen Djeffal - Played 5 games, scored 8 times.
- Mahmoud Bouanik - Played 6 games, scored 13 times.
- Fethnour Lacheheb - Played 6 games, scored 4 times.
- Kamel Ouchia - Played 6 games, never scored.
- Abdel Salem Ben Magh Soula - Played 6 games, scored 11 times
- Zineddine Mohamed Seghir - Played 6 games, scored 21 times.
- Abu Sofiane Draouci (Note: also competed at the 1984 Summer Olympics) - Played 2 games, never scored.
- Mourad Boussebt - Played 6 games, scored 1 time.
- Mohamed Machou - Did not start.

Group play

Pos	Team	Pld	W	D	L	GF	GA	GD	Pts	Qualification
1	Soviet Union	5	5	0	0	130	82	+48	10	Gold medal game
2	Yugoslavia	5	3	1	1	116	109	+7	7	Bronze medal game
3	Sweden	5	3	0	2	106	91	+15	6	Fifth place game
4	Iceland	5	2	1	2	96	102	−6	5	Seventh place game
5	Algeria	5	1	0	4	89	109	−20	2	Ninth place game
6	United States	5	0	0	5	81	125	−44	0	Eleventh place game

20 September 1988; 14:00	Sweden	21–18	Algeria	Suwon Gymnasium, Suwon; Referees: Lelong, Tancrez (FRA)
20 September 1988; 14:00	Hajas, Järphag 4	(14–9)	Seghir 5	Suwon Gymnasium, Suwon; Referees: Lelong, Tancrez (FRA)
20 September 1988; 14:00	2× (yellow card) 4× (suspension)		3× (yellow card) 6× (suspension)	Suwon Gymnasium, Suwon; Referees: Lelong, Tancrez (FRA)

22 September 1988; 18:00	Iceland	22–16	Algeria	Suwon Gymnasium, Suwon; Referees: Zaworotny, Brosio (ARG)
22 September 1988; 18:00	Arason 8	(11–8)	Seghir 4	Suwon Gymnasium, Suwon; Referees: Zaworotny, Brosio (ARG)
22 September 1988; 18:00	2× (yellow card) 6× (suspension)		2× (yellow card) 6× (suspension)	Suwon Gymnasium, Suwon; Referees: Zaworotny, Brosio (ARG)

24 September 1988; 10:00	Yugoslavia	23–22	Algeria	Suwon Gymnasium, Suwon; Referees: Rauchfuß, Buchda (GDR)
24 September 1988; 10:00	Smajlagić 7	(10–11)	three players 4	Suwon Gymnasium, Suwon; Referees: Rauchfuß, Buchda (GDR)
24 September 1988; 10:00	3× (yellow card) 7× (suspension)		3× (yellow card) 3× (suspension)	Suwon Gymnasium, Suwon; Referees: Rauchfuß, Buchda (GDR)

26 September 1988; 18:00	Soviet Union	26–13	Algeria	Suwon Gymnasium, Suwon; Referees: Lee, Park (KOR)
26 September 1988; 18:00	Gopin, Nesterov 4	(13–5)	Bouanik 5	Suwon Gymnasium, Suwon; Referees: Lee, Park (KOR)
26 September 1988; 18:00	2× (yellow card) 2× (suspension)		1× (yellow card) 4× (suspension)	Suwon Gymnasium, Suwon; Referees: Lee, Park (KOR)

28 September 1988; 10:00	United States	17–20	Algeria	Suwon Gymnasium, Suwon; Referees: Lelong, Tancrez (FRA)
28 September 1988; 10:00	Hillery, Lash 5	(8–10)	three players 3	Suwon Gymnasium, Suwon; Referees: Lelong, Tancrez (FRA)
28 September 1988; 10:00	3× (yellow card) 4× (suspension)		3× (yellow card) 2× (suspension)	Suwon Gymnasium, Suwon; Referees: Lelong, Tancrez (FRA)

9th place match

30 September 1988; 11:30	Algeria	15–21	Spain	Suwon Gymnasium, Suwon; Referees: Ludvigsen, Sjong (NOR)
30 September 1988; 11:30	Seghir 5	(6–11)	Marín 4	Suwon Gymnasium, Suwon; Referees: Ludvigsen, Sjong (NOR)
30 September 1988; 11:30			2× (yellow card) 3× (suspension)	Suwon Gymnasium, Suwon; Referees: Ludvigsen, Sjong (NOR)

== Judo ==
Athlete	Event	Round of 64	Round of 32	Round of 16	Quarterfinals	Semifinals	Repechage			Final	
Athlete	Event	Round of 64	Round of 32	Round of 16	Quarterfinals	Semifinals	Round 1	Round 2	Round 3	Final	
Athlete	Event	Opposition Result	Opposition Result	Opposition Result	Opposition Result	Opposition Result	Opposition Result	Opposition Result	Opposition Result	Opposition Result	Rank
Ali Idir	60 kg	Bye	Takahashi (CAN); W Ippon	Csák (HUN); L Koka	Did not advance						
Meziane Dahmani	65 kg	Bećanović (YUG); L Yusei-gachi	Did not advance								
Mohamed Meridja	71 kg	Bye	Ruiz (ESP); L Yuko	Did not advance							
Riad Chibani	86 kg	Bye	Medina (COL); W Waza-ari	Canu (FRA); L Koka	Did not advance						
Boualem Miloudi	+95 kg	—N/a	Venturelli (ITA); L Ippon	Did not advance							

== Tennis ==
Women

Athlete	Event	Round of 64	Round of 32	Round of 16	Quarterfinals	Semifinals	Final	
Athlete	Event	Opposition Result	Opposition Result	Opposition Result	Opposition Result	Opposition Result	Opposition Result	Rank
Warda Bouchabou	Singles	Scheuer-Larsen (DEN); L (0–6, 1–6)	Did not advance					

== Weightlifting ==
Athlete	Event	Snatch		Clean & jerk		Total	Rank
Athlete	Event	Result	Rank	Result	Rank	Total	Rank
Azzedine Basbas	56 kg	107.5	9	137.5	8	245.0	10
Omar Yousfi	110 kg	140.0	16	170.0	14	310.0	14
