= Handball at the 1986 Goodwill Games =

== Medalists ==
Event	Gold	Silver	Bronze
Men	Soviet Union Valery Gopin; Aleksandr Malinovsky; Sergey Rybakov; Andrei Xepkin; Konstantin Sharovarov; Igor Chumak; Aleksandr Tuchkin; Mikhail Vasilyev; Yury Kidyayev; Valdemaras Novickis; Aleksandr Rymanov; Yury Shevtsov; Aleksandr Shipenko; Georgy Sviridenko; Raimondas Valuzkas	United States Jim Buehning; Bob Djokovich; Craig Fitschen; Boyd Janny; Joe McVein; Greg Morava; Jan Erik Paris; Joe Story; Scott Carlsen; Scott Driggers; Steve Goss; Bill Kessler; Rodney Mitchell; Rod Oshita; Tom Schneeberger	Czechoslovakia Miroslav Bajgar; Petr Baumruk; Milan Folta; Martin Lipták; Ján Sedláček; Libor Sovadina; Ľubomír Švajlen; Jan Bašný; Milan Brestovanský; Jiří Kotrč; Peter Mesiarik; Milan Skvaril; František Štika; Csaba Szücs
Women	Soviet Union Nataliya Anisimova; Nataliya Tsygankova; Elina Guseva; Nataliya Kirchyk; Irina Malko; Tamila Oleksyuk; Tatyana Shalimova; Valentina Zubku; Marina Bazanova; Tatyana Gorb; Larisa Karlova; Yelena Kuznetsova; Svetlana Mankova; Olga Semyonova; Zinaida Turchina	Germany Meike Birkmose; Sabine Fricke; Sabine Hintz; Sabrina Koschella; Barbara Pfister; Sigrid Schieß; Dagmar Stelberg; Sabine Wagner; Silvia Schmitt; Sabine Erbs; Petra Helfers; Petra Platen; Manuela Schmidt; Michaela Traub; Dagmar Zöllner	Hungary Mária Acsbog; Erika Csapó; Anikó Géczi; Katalin Gombai; Zsuzsa Nyári; Marianna Rácz; Katalin Szilágyi; Ildikó Tóth; Ildikó Barna; Csilla Elekes; Marianna Nagy-Gódor; Éva Kovács; Csilla Orbán; Erzsébet Suluuk; Anna Topa; Rúzsa Tóth
