= Joe Story =

American handball player

Personal information
- Full name: Joseph Bradley Story
- Nationality: American
- Born: March 3, 1952 (age 74) Seattle, Washington, U.S.
- Height: 5 ft 7 in (1.70 m)

Sport
- Sport: Handball
Medal record
Men's handball
Representing the United States
Pan American Games
Gold medal – first place	1987 Indianapolis	Team
Goodwill Games
Silver medal – second place	1986 Moscow	Team

Joseph Bradley Story (born March 3, 1952, in Seattle, Washington) is an American former handball player who competed in the 1984 Summer Olympics and in the 1988 Summer Olympics.
