= Major achievements in handball by nation =

This article contains lists of achievements in major senior-level international indoor handball, beach handball and field handball tournaments according to first-place, second-place and third-place results obtained by teams representing different nations. The objective is not to create combined medal tables; the focus is on listing the best positions achieved by teams in major international tournaments, ranking the nations according to the most podiums accomplished by teams of these nations.

== Results ==
For the making of these lists, results from following major international tournaments were consulted:

Form	Governing body	Tournament	Edition		
Form	Governing body	Tournament	First	Latest	Next
Indoor handball	IHF & IOC	Handball at the Summer Olympics (quadrennially)	1972	2024	2028
Indoor handball	IAHF (1938) & IHF	IHF World Men's Handball Championship (biennially)	1938	2025	2027
Indoor handball	IAHF (1938) & IHF	IHF World Women's Handball Championship (biennially)	1957	2025	2027
Beach handball	IHF & IWGA	Beach handball at the World Games (quadrennially)	2001	2025	2029
Beach handball	IHF	Beach Handball World Championships (biennially)	2004	2026	2028
Field handball	IAHF & IOC	Field handball at the Summer Olympics	1936	1936	Defunct
Field handball	IAHF & IHF	IHF World Men's Outdoor Handball Championship	1938	1966	Defunct
Field handball	IHF	IHF World Women's Outdoor Handball Championship	1949	1960	Defunct

- IHF: International Handball Federation
- IAHF: International Amateur Handball Federation
- IOC: International Olympic Committee
- IWGA: International World Games Association

Medals for the demonstration events are NOT counted. Medals earned by athletes from defunct National Olympic Committees (NOCs) or historical teams are NOT merged with the results achieved by their immediate successor states. The International Olympic Committee (IOC) do NOT combine medals of these nations or teams.

The tables are pre-sorted by total number of first-place results, second-place results and third-place results, then most first-place results, second-place results, respectively. When equal ranks are given, nations are listed in alphabetical order.

=== Indoor handball, beach handball and field handball ===
==== Men and women ====
Last updated after the 2026 IHF Beach Handball World Championships (As of 28 June 2026)
		Indoor handball				Beach handball				Field handball			Number of			
		Olympic Games		World Championships		World Games		World Championships		Olympic Games	World Championships		Number of			
Rk.	Nation	Men	Women	Men	Women	Men	Women	Men	Women	Men	Men	Women	1st place, gold medalist(s)	2nd place, silver medalist(s)	3rd place, bronze medalist(s)	Total
1	Germany	2nd place, silver medalist(s)		1st place, gold medalist(s)	1st place, gold medalist(s)	1st place, gold medalist(s)	1st place, gold medalist(s)	1st place, gold medalist(s)	1st place, gold medalist(s)	1st place, gold medalist(s)	1st place, gold medalist(s)	3rd place, bronze medalist(s)	8	1	1	10
2	Hungary		2nd place, silver medalist(s)	2nd place, silver medalist(s)	1st place, gold medalist(s)	2nd place, silver medalist(s)	2nd place, silver medalist(s)	2nd place, silver medalist(s)	2nd place, silver medalist(s)		3rd place, bronze medalist(s)	1st place, gold medalist(s)	2	6	1	9
3	Spain	3rd place, bronze medalist(s)	3rd place, bronze medalist(s)	1st place, gold medalist(s)	2nd place, silver medalist(s)	2nd place, silver medalist(s)	3rd place, bronze medalist(s)	3rd place, bronze medalist(s)	1st place, gold medalist(s)				2	2	4	8
4	Russia	1st place, gold medalist(s)	1st place, gold medalist(s)	1st place, gold medalist(s)	1st place, gold medalist(s)	1st place, gold medalist(s)		3rd place, bronze medalist(s)	1st place, gold medalist(s)				6	0	1	7
5	Denmark	1st place, gold medalist(s)	1st place, gold medalist(s)	1st place, gold medalist(s)	1st place, gold medalist(s)			2nd place, silver medalist(s)	2nd place, silver medalist(s)		2nd place, silver medalist(s)		4	3	0	7
6	Croatia	1st place, gold medalist(s)		1st place, gold medalist(s)		1st place, gold medalist(s)	2nd place, silver medalist(s)	1st place, gold medalist(s)	1st place, gold medalist(s)				5	1	0	6
7	Brazil				1st place, gold medalist(s)	1st place, gold medalist(s)	1st place, gold medalist(s)	1st place, gold medalist(s)	1st place, gold medalist(s)				5	0	0	5
8	East Germany^{*}	1st place, gold medalist(s)	2nd place, silver medalist(s)	2nd place, silver medalist(s)	1st place, gold medalist(s)						1st place, gold medalist(s)		3	2	0	5
8	Norway		1st place, gold medalist(s)	2nd place, silver medalist(s)	1st place, gold medalist(s)		2nd place, silver medalist(s)		1st place, gold medalist(s)				3	2	0	5
8	Romania	2nd place, silver medalist(s)		1st place, gold medalist(s)	1st place, gold medalist(s)						2nd place, silver medalist(s)	1st place, gold medalist(s)	3	2	0	5
11	West Germany^{*}	2nd place, silver medalist(s)		1st place, gold medalist(s)	3rd place, bronze medalist(s)						1st place, gold medalist(s)	2nd place, silver medalist(s)	2	2	1	5
12	Czechoslovakia^{*}	2nd place, silver medalist(s)		1st place, gold medalist(s)	1st place, gold medalist(s)						3rd place, bronze medalist(s)	3rd place, bronze medalist(s)	2	1	2	5
13	Austria			2nd place, silver medalist(s)	3rd place, bronze medalist(s)					2nd place, silver medalist(s)	3rd place, bronze medalist(s)	2nd place, silver medalist(s)	0	3	2	5
14	France	1st place, gold medalist(s)	1st place, gold medalist(s)	1st place, gold medalist(s)	1st place, gold medalist(s)								4	0	0	4
14	Soviet Union^{*}	1st place, gold medalist(s)	1st place, gold medalist(s)	1st place, gold medalist(s)	1st place, gold medalist(s)								4	0	0	4
14	Yugoslavia^{*}	1st place, gold medalist(s)	1st place, gold medalist(s)	1st place, gold medalist(s)	1st place, gold medalist(s)								4	0	0	4
17	South Korea	2nd place, silver medalist(s)	1st place, gold medalist(s)		1st place, gold medalist(s)								2	1	0	3
17	Sweden	2nd place, silver medalist(s)		1st place, gold medalist(s)							1st place, gold medalist(s)		2	1	0	3
19	Argentina						1st place, gold medalist(s)	3rd place, bronze medalist(s)	1st place, gold medalist(s)				2	0	1	3
		Indoor handball				Beach handball				Field handball			Number of			
		Olympic Games		World Championships		World Games		World Championships		Olympic Games	World Championships		Number of			
Rk.	Nation	Men	Women	Men	Women	Men	Women	Men	Women	Men	Men	Women	1st place, gold medalist(s)	2nd place, silver medalist(s)	3rd place, bronze medalist(s)	Total
20	Ukraine		3rd place, bronze medalist(s)				1st place, gold medalist(s)	2nd place, silver medalist(s)					1	1	1	3
21	Qatar			2nd place, silver medalist(s)		2nd place, silver medalist(s)		3rd place, bronze medalist(s)					0	2	1	3
21	Turkey						3rd place, bronze medalist(s)	2nd place, silver medalist(s)	2nd place, silver medalist(s)				0	2	1	3
23	Italy						1st place, gold medalist(s)		3rd place, bronze medalist(s)				1	0	1	2
23	Netherlands				1st place, gold medalist(s)				3rd place, bronze medalist(s)				1	0	1	2
23	Unified Team^{*}	1st place, gold medalist(s)	3rd place, bronze medalist(s)										1	0	1	2
26	Poland	3rd place, bronze medalist(s)		2nd place, silver medalist(s)									0	1	1	2
26	Portugal					2nd place, silver medalist(s)		3rd place, bronze medalist(s)					0	1	1	2
26	Serbia				2nd place, silver medalist(s)			3rd place, bronze medalist(s)					0	1	1	2
26	Switzerland									3rd place, bronze medalist(s)	2nd place, silver medalist(s)		0	1	1	2
30	Serbia and Montenegro^{*}			3rd place, bronze medalist(s)	3rd place, bronze medalist(s)								0	0	2	2
31	Belarus					1st place, gold medalist(s)							1	0	0	1
31	Egypt							1st place, gold medalist(s)					1	0	0	1
31	Greece								1st place, gold medalist(s)				1	0	0	1
34	Iceland	2nd place, silver medalist(s)											0	1	0	1
34	Montenegro		2nd place, silver medalist(s)										0	1	0	1
34	ROC^{*}		2nd place, silver medalist(s)										0	1	0	1
37	China		3rd place, bronze medalist(s)										0	0	1	1
37	Slovenia			3rd place, bronze medalist(s)									0	0	1	1

^{*}Defunct National Olympic Committees (NOCs) or historical teams are shown in italic.

==== Men ====
Last updated after the 2026 Men's Beach Handball World Championships (As of 28 June 2026)
		Indoor handball		Beach handball		Field handball		Number of			
		Olympic Games	World Championships	World Games	World Championships	Olympic Games	World Championships	Number of			
Rk.	Nation	Men	Men	Men	Men	Men	Men	1st place, gold medalist(s)	2nd place, silver medalist(s)	3rd place, bronze medalist(s)	Total
1	Germany	2nd place, silver medalist(s)	1st place, gold medalist(s)	1st place, gold medalist(s)	1st place, gold medalist(s)	1st place, gold medalist(s)	1st place, gold medalist(s)	5	1	0	6
2	Croatia	1st place, gold medalist(s)	1st place, gold medalist(s)	1st place, gold medalist(s)	1st place, gold medalist(s)			4	0	0	4
3	Russia	1st place, gold medalist(s)	1st place, gold medalist(s)	1st place, gold medalist(s)	3rd place, bronze medalist(s)			3	0	1	4
4	Denmark	1st place, gold medalist(s)	1st place, gold medalist(s)		2nd place, silver medalist(s)		2nd place, silver medalist(s)	2	2	0	4
5	Spain	3rd place, bronze medalist(s)	1st place, gold medalist(s)	2nd place, silver medalist(s)	3rd place, bronze medalist(s)			1	1	2	4
6	Hungary		2nd place, silver medalist(s)	2nd place, silver medalist(s)	2nd place, silver medalist(s)		3rd place, bronze medalist(s)	0	3	1	4
7	East Germany^{*}	1st place, gold medalist(s)	2nd place, silver medalist(s)				1st place, gold medalist(s)	2	1	0	3
7	Sweden	2nd place, silver medalist(s)	1st place, gold medalist(s)				1st place, gold medalist(s)	2	1	0	3
7	West Germany^{*}	2nd place, silver medalist(s)	1st place, gold medalist(s)				1st place, gold medalist(s)	2	1	0	3
10	Romania	2nd place, silver medalist(s)	1st place, gold medalist(s)				2nd place, silver medalist(s)	1	2	0	3
11	Czechoslovakia^{*}	2nd place, silver medalist(s)	1st place, gold medalist(s)				3rd place, bronze medalist(s)	1	1	1	3
12	Austria		2nd place, silver medalist(s)			2nd place, silver medalist(s)	3rd place, bronze medalist(s)	0	2	1	3
12	Qatar		2nd place, silver medalist(s)	2nd place, silver medalist(s)	3rd place, bronze medalist(s)			0	2	1	3
14	Brazil			1st place, gold medalist(s)	1st place, gold medalist(s)			2	0	0	2
14	France	1st place, gold medalist(s)	1st place, gold medalist(s)					2	0	0	2
14	Soviet Union^{*}	1st place, gold medalist(s)	1st place, gold medalist(s)					2	0	0	2
14	Yugoslavia^{*}	1st place, gold medalist(s)	1st place, gold medalist(s)					2	0	0	2
		Indoor handball		Beach handball		Field handball		Number of			
		Olympic Games	World Championships	World Games	World Championships	Olympic Games	World Championships	Number of			
Rk.	Nation	Men	Men	Men	Men	Men	Men	1st place, gold medalist(s)	2nd place, silver medalist(s)	3rd place, bronze medalist(s)	Total
18	Poland	3rd place, bronze medalist(s)	2nd place, silver medalist(s)					0	1	1	2
18	Portugal			2nd place, silver medalist(s)	3rd place, bronze medalist(s)			0	1	1	2
18	Switzerland					3rd place, bronze medalist(s)	2nd place, silver medalist(s)	0	1	1	2
21	Belarus			1st place, gold medalist(s)				1	0	0	1
21	Egypt				1st place, gold medalist(s)			1	0	0	1
21	Unified Team^{*}	1st place, gold medalist(s)						1	0	0	1
24	Iceland	2nd place, silver medalist(s)						0	1	0	1
24	Norway		2nd place, silver medalist(s)					0	1	0	1
24	South Korea	2nd place, silver medalist(s)						0	1	0	1
24	Turkey				2nd place, silver medalist(s)			0	1	0	1
24	Ukraine				2nd place, silver medalist(s)			0	1	0	1
29	Argentina				3rd place, bronze medalist(s)			0	0	1	1
29	Serbia				3rd place, bronze medalist(s)			0	0	1	1
29	Serbia and Montenegro^{*}		3rd place, bronze medalist(s)					0	0	1	1
29	Slovenia		3rd place, bronze medalist(s)					0	0	1	1

^{*}Defunct National Olympic Committees (NOCs) or historical teams are shown in italic.

==== Women ====
Last updated after the 2026 Women's Beach Handball World Championships (As of 28 June 2026)
		Indoor handball		Beach handball		Field handball	Number of			
		Olympic Games	World Championships	World Games	World Championships	World Championships	Number of			
Rk.	Nation	Women	Women	Women	Women	Women	1st place, gold medalist(s)	2nd place, silver medalist(s)	3rd place, bronze medalist(s)	Total
1	Hungary	2nd place, silver medalist(s)	1st place, gold medalist(s)	2nd place, silver medalist(s)	2nd place, silver medalist(s)	1st place, gold medalist(s)	2	3	0	5
2	Germany		1st place, gold medalist(s)	1st place, gold medalist(s)	1st place, gold medalist(s)	3rd place, bronze medalist(s)	3	0	1	4
2	Norway	1st place, gold medalist(s)	1st place, gold medalist(s)	1st place, gold medalist(s)	3rd place, bronze medalist(s)		3	0	1	4
4	Spain	3rd place, bronze medalist(s)	2nd place, silver medalist(s)	3rd place, bronze medalist(s)	1st place, gold medalist(s)		1	1	2	4
5	Brazil		1st place, gold medalist(s)	1st place, gold medalist(s)	1st place, gold medalist(s)		3	0	0	3
6	Russia	1st place, gold medalist(s)	1st place, gold medalist(s)	1st place, gold medalist(s)			3	0	0	3
7	Denmark	1st place, gold medalist(s)	1st place, gold medalist(s)	2nd place, silver medalist(s)			2	1	0	3
8	Argentina			1st place, gold medalist(s)	1st place, gold medalist(s)		2	0	0	2
8	France	1st place, gold medalist(s)	1st place, gold medalist(s)				2	0	0	2
8	Romania		1st place, gold medalist(s)			1st place, gold medalist(s)	2	0	0	2
8	South Korea	1st place, gold medalist(s)	1st place, gold medalist(s)				2	0	0	2
8	Soviet Union^{*}	1st place, gold medalist(s)	1st place, gold medalist(s)				2	0	0	2
8	Yugoslavia^{*}	1st place, gold medalist(s)	1st place, gold medalist(s)				2	0	0	2
		Indoor handball		Beach handball		Field handball	Number of			
		Olympic Games	World Championships	World Games	World Championships	World Championships	Number of			
Rk.	Nation	Women	Women	Women	Women	Women	1st place, gold medalist(s)	2nd place, silver medalist(s)	3rd place, bronze medalist(s)	Total
14	Croatia			1st place, gold medalist(s)	2nd place, silver medalist(s)		1	1	0	2
14	East Germany^{*}	2nd place, silver medalist(s)	1st place, gold medalist(s)				1	1	0	2
16	Czechoslovakia^{*}		1st place, gold medalist(s)			3rd place, bronze medalist(s)	1	0	1	2
16	Italy			3rd place, bronze medalist(s)	1st place, gold medalist(s)		1	0	1	2
16	Netherlands		1st place, gold medalist(s)		3rd place, bronze medalist(s)		1	0	1	2
16	Ukraine	3rd place, bronze medalist(s)			1st place, gold medalist(s)		1	0	1	2
20	Austria		3rd place, bronze medalist(s)			2nd place, silver medalist(s)	0	1	1	2
20	Turkey			2nd place, silver medalist(s)	3rd place, bronze medalist(s)		0	1	1	2
20	West Germany^{*}		3rd place, bronze medalist(s)			2nd place, silver medalist(s)	0	1	1	2
23	Greece			1st place, gold medalist(s)			1	0	0	1
24	Montenegro	2nd place, silver medalist(s)					0	1	0	1
24	ROC^{*}	2nd place, silver medalist(s)					0	1	0	1
24	Serbia		2nd place, silver medalist(s)				0	1	0	1
27	China	3rd place, bronze medalist(s)					0	0	1	1
27	Serbia and Montenegro^{*}		3rd place, bronze medalist(s)				0	0	1	1
27	Unified Team^{*}	3rd place, bronze medalist(s)					0	0	1	1

^{*}Defunct National Olympic Committees (NOCs) or historical teams are shown in italic.

=== Indoor handball ===
==== Men and women ====
Last updated after the 2025 World Women's Handball Championship (As of 14 December 2025)
		Indoor handball				Number of			
		Olympic Games		World Championships		Number of			
Rk.	Nation	Men	Women	Men	Women	1st place, gold medalist(s)	2nd place, silver medalist(s)	3rd place, bronze medalist(s)	Total
1	Denmark	1st place, gold medalist(s)	1st place, gold medalist(s)	1st place, gold medalist(s)	1st place, gold medalist(s)	4	0	0	4
1	France	1st place, gold medalist(s)	1st place, gold medalist(s)	1st place, gold medalist(s)	1st place, gold medalist(s)	4	0	0	4
1	Russia	1st place, gold medalist(s)	1st place, gold medalist(s)	1st place, gold medalist(s)	1st place, gold medalist(s)	4	0	0	4
1	Soviet Union^{*}	1st place, gold medalist(s)	1st place, gold medalist(s)	1st place, gold medalist(s)	1st place, gold medalist(s)	4	0	0	4
1	Yugoslavia^{*}	1st place, gold medalist(s)	1st place, gold medalist(s)	1st place, gold medalist(s)	1st place, gold medalist(s)	4	0	0	4
6	East Germany^{*}	1st place, gold medalist(s)	2nd place, silver medalist(s)	2nd place, silver medalist(s)	1st place, gold medalist(s)	2	2	0	4
7	Spain	3rd place, bronze medalist(s)	3rd place, bronze medalist(s)	1st place, gold medalist(s)	2nd place, silver medalist(s)	1	1	2	4
8	Czechoslovakia^{*}	2nd place, silver medalist(s)		1st place, gold medalist(s)	1st place, gold medalist(s)	2	1	0	3
8	Germany	2nd place, silver medalist(s)		1st place, gold medalist(s)	1st place, gold medalist(s)	2	1	0	3
8	Norway		1st place, gold medalist(s)	2nd place, silver medalist(s)	1st place, gold medalist(s)	2	1	0	3
8	Romania	2nd place, silver medalist(s)		1st place, gold medalist(s)	1st place, gold medalist(s)	2	1	0	3
8	South Korea	2nd place, silver medalist(s)	1st place, gold medalist(s)		1st place, gold medalist(s)	2	1	0	3
13	Hungary		2nd place, silver medalist(s)	2nd place, silver medalist(s)	1st place, gold medalist(s)	1	2	0	3
14	West Germany^{*}	2nd place, silver medalist(s)		1st place, gold medalist(s)	3rd place, bronze medalist(s)	1	1	1	3
		Indoor handball				Number of			
		Olympic Games		World Championships		Number of			
Rk.	Nation	Men	Women	Men	Women	1st place, gold medalist(s)	2nd place, silver medalist(s)	3rd place, bronze medalist(s)	Total
15	Croatia	1st place, gold medalist(s)		1st place, gold medalist(s)		2	0	0	2
16	Sweden	2nd place, silver medalist(s)		1st place, gold medalist(s)		1	1	0	2
17	Unified Team^{*}	1st place, gold medalist(s)	3rd place, bronze medalist(s)			1	0	1	2
18	Austria			2nd place, silver medalist(s)	3rd place, bronze medalist(s)	0	1	1	2
18	Poland	3rd place, bronze medalist(s)		2nd place, silver medalist(s)		0	1	1	2
20	Serbia and Montenegro^{*}			3rd place, bronze medalist(s)	3rd place, bronze medalist(s)	0	0	2	2
21	Brazil				1st place, gold medalist(s)	1	0	0	1
21	Netherlands				1st place, gold medalist(s)	1	0	0	1
23	Iceland	2nd place, silver medalist(s)				0	1	0	1
23	Montenegro		2nd place, silver medalist(s)			0	1	0	1
23	Qatar			2nd place, silver medalist(s)		0	1	0	1
23	ROC^{*}		2nd place, silver medalist(s)			0	1	0	1
23	Serbia				2nd place, silver medalist(s)	0	1	0	1
28	China		3rd place, bronze medalist(s)			0	0	1	1
28	Slovenia			3rd place, bronze medalist(s)		0	0	1	1
28	Ukraine		3rd place, bronze medalist(s)			0	0	1	1

^{*}Defunct National Olympic Committees (NOCs) or historical teams are shown in italic.

==== Men ====
Last updated after the 2025 World Men's Handball Championship (As of 2 February 2025)
		Indoor handball		Number of			
		Olympic Games	World Championships	Number of			
Rk.	Nation	Men	Men	1st place, gold medalist(s)	2nd place, silver medalist(s)	3rd place, bronze medalist(s)	Total
1	Croatia	1st place, gold medalist(s)	1st place, gold medalist(s)	2	0	0	2
1	Denmark	1st place, gold medalist(s)	1st place, gold medalist(s)	2	0	0	2
1	France	1st place, gold medalist(s)	1st place, gold medalist(s)	2	0	0	2
1	Russia	1st place, gold medalist(s)	1st place, gold medalist(s)	2	0	0	2
1	Soviet Union^{*}	1st place, gold medalist(s)	1st place, gold medalist(s)	2	0	0	2
1	Yugoslavia^{*}	1st place, gold medalist(s)	1st place, gold medalist(s)	2	0	0	2
7	Czechoslovakia^{*}	2nd place, silver medalist(s)	1st place, gold medalist(s)	1	1	0	2
7	East Germany^{*}	1st place, gold medalist(s)	2nd place, silver medalist(s)	1	1	0	2
7	Germany	2nd place, silver medalist(s)	1st place, gold medalist(s)	1	1	0	2
7	Romania	2nd place, silver medalist(s)	1st place, gold medalist(s)	1	1	0	2
7	Sweden	2nd place, silver medalist(s)	1st place, gold medalist(s)	1	1	0	2
7	West Germany^{*}	2nd place, silver medalist(s)	1st place, gold medalist(s)	1	1	0	2
13	Spain	3rd place, bronze medalist(s)	1st place, gold medalist(s)	1	0	1	2
14	Poland	3rd place, bronze medalist(s)	2nd place, silver medalist(s)	0	1	1	2
15	Unified Team^{*}	1st place, gold medalist(s)		1	0	0	1
16	Austria		2nd place, silver medalist(s)	0	1	0	1
16	Hungary		2nd place, silver medalist(s)	0	1	0	1
16	Iceland	2nd place, silver medalist(s)		0	1	0	1
16	Norway		2nd place, silver medalist(s)	0	1	0	1
16	Qatar		2nd place, silver medalist(s)	0	1	0	1
16	South Korea	2nd place, silver medalist(s)		0	1	0	1
22	Serbia and Montenegro^{*}		3rd place, bronze medalist(s)	0	0	1	1
22	Slovenia		3rd place, bronze medalist(s)	0	0	1	1

^{*}Defunct National Olympic Committees (NOCs) or historical teams are shown in italic.

==== Women ====
Last updated after the 2025 World Women's Handball Championship (As of 14 December 2025)
		Indoor handball		Number of			
		Olympic Games	World Championships	Number of			
Rk.	Nation	Women	Women	1st place, gold medalist(s)	2nd place, silver medalist(s)	3rd place, bronze medalist(s)	Total
1	Denmark	1st place, gold medalist(s)	1st place, gold medalist(s)	2	0	0	2
1	France	1st place, gold medalist(s)	1st place, gold medalist(s)	2	0	0	2
1	Norway	1st place, gold medalist(s)	1st place, gold medalist(s)	2	0	0	2
1	Russia	1st place, gold medalist(s)	1st place, gold medalist(s)	2	0	0	2
1	South Korea	1st place, gold medalist(s)	1st place, gold medalist(s)	2	0	0	2
1	Soviet Union^{*}	1st place, gold medalist(s)	1st place, gold medalist(s)	2	0	0	2
1	Yugoslavia^{*}	1st place, gold medalist(s)	1st place, gold medalist(s)	2	0	0	2
8	East Germany^{*}	2nd place, silver medalist(s)	1st place, gold medalist(s)	1	1	0	2
8	Hungary	2nd place, silver medalist(s)	1st place, gold medalist(s)	1	1	0	2
10	Spain	3rd place, bronze medalist(s)	2nd place, silver medalist(s)	0	1	1	2
11	Brazil		1st place, gold medalist(s)	1	0	0	1
11	Czechoslovakia^{*}		1st place, gold medalist(s)	1	0	0	1
11	Germany		1st place, gold medalist(s)	1	0	0	1
11	Netherlands		1st place, gold medalist(s)	1	0	0	1
11	Romania		1st place, gold medalist(s)	1	0	0	1
16	Montenegro	2nd place, silver medalist(s)		0	1	0	1
16	ROC^{*}	2nd place, silver medalist(s)		0	1	0	1
16	Serbia		2nd place, silver medalist(s)	0	1	0	1
19	Austria		3rd place, bronze medalist(s)	0	0	1	1
19	China	3rd place, bronze medalist(s)		0	0	1	1
19	Serbia and Montenegro^{*}		3rd place, bronze medalist(s)	0	0	1	1
19	Ukraine	3rd place, bronze medalist(s)		0	0	1	1
19	Unified Team^{*}	3rd place, bronze medalist(s)		0	0	1	1
19	West Germany^{*}		3rd place, bronze medalist(s)	0	0	1	1

^{*}Defunct National Olympic Committees (NOCs) or historical teams are shown in italic.

=== Beach handball ===
==== Men and women ====
Last updated after the 2026 Beach Handball World Championships (As of 28 June 2026)
		Beach handball				Number of			
		World Games		World Championships		Number of			
Rk.	Nation	Men	Women	Men	Women	1st place, gold medalist(s)	2nd place, silver medalist(s)	3rd place, bronze medalist(s)	Total
1	Brazil	1st place, gold medalist(s)	1st place, gold medalist(s)	1st place, gold medalist(s)	1st place, gold medalist(s)	4	0	0	4
1	Germany	1st place, gold medalist(s)	1st place, gold medalist(s)	1st place, gold medalist(s)	1st place, gold medalist(s)	4	0	0	4
3	Croatia	1st place, gold medalist(s)	2nd place, silver medalist(s)	1st place, gold medalist(s)	1st place, gold medalist(s)	3	1	0	4
4	Spain	2nd place, silver medalist(s)	3rd place, bronze medalist(s)	3rd place, bronze medalist(s)	1st place, gold medalist(s)	1	1	2	4
5	Hungary	2nd place, silver medalist(s)	2nd place, silver medalist(s)	2nd place, silver medalist(s)	2nd place, silver medalist(s)	0	4	0	4
6	Argentina		1st place, gold medalist(s)	3rd place, bronze medalist(s)	1st place, gold medalist(s)	2	0	1	3
6	Russia	1st place, gold medalist(s)		3rd place, bronze medalist(s)	1st place, gold medalist(s)	2	0	1	3
8	Turkey		3rd place, bronze medalist(s)	2nd place, silver medalist(s)	2nd place, silver medalist(s)	0	2	1	3
9	Norway		2nd place, silver medalist(s)		1st place, gold medalist(s)	1	1	0	2
9	Ukraine		1st place, gold medalist(s)	2nd place, silver medalist(s)		1	1	0	2
11	Italy		1st place, gold medalist(s)		3rd place, bronze medalist(s)	1	0	1	2
12	Denmark			2nd place, silver medalist(s)	2nd place, silver medalist(s)	0	2	0	2
13	Qatar	2nd place, silver medalist(s)		3rd place, bronze medalist(s)		0	1	1	2
14	Belarus	1st place, gold medalist(s)				1	0	0	1
14	Egypt			1st place, gold medalist(s)		1	0	0	1
14	Greece				1st place, gold medalist(s)	1	0	0	1
17	Portugal	2nd place, silver medalist(s)				0	1	0	1
18	Netherlands				3rd place, bronze medalist(s)	0	0	1	1
18	Serbia			3rd place, bronze medalist(s)		0	0	1	1

^{*}Defunct National Olympic Committees (NOCs) or historical teams are shown in italic.

==== Men ====
Last updated after the 2026 Men's Beach Handball World Championships (As of 28 June 2026)
		Beach handball		Number of			
		World Games	World Championships	Number of			
Rk.	Nation	Men	Men	1st place, gold medalist(s)	2nd place, silver medalist(s)	3rd place, bronze medalist(s)	Total
1	Brazil	1st place, gold medalist(s)	1st place, gold medalist(s)	2	0	0	2
1	Croatia	1st place, gold medalist(s)	1st place, gold medalist(s)	2	0	0	2
1	Germany	1st place, gold medalist(s)	1st place, gold medalist(s)	2	0	0	2
4	Russia	1st place, gold medalist(s)	3rd place, bronze medalist(s)	1	0	1	2
5	Hungary	2nd place, silver medalist(s)	2nd place, silver medalist(s)	0	2	0	2
6	Portugal	2nd place, silver medalist(s)	3rd place, bronze medalist(s)	0	1	1	2
6	Qatar	2nd place, silver medalist(s)	3rd place, bronze medalist(s)	0	1	1	2
6	Spain	2nd place, silver medalist(s)	3rd place, bronze medalist(s)	0	1	1	2
9	Belarus	1st place, gold medalist(s)		1	0	0	1
9	Egypt		1st place, gold medalist(s)	1	0	0	1
11	Denmark		2nd place, silver medalist(s)	0	1	0	1
11	Turkey		2nd place, silver medalist(s)	0	1	0	1
11	Ukraine		2nd place, silver medalist(s)	0	1	0	1
14	Argentina		3rd place, bronze medalist(s)	0	0	1	1
14	Serbia		3rd place, bronze medalist(s)	0	0	1	1

^{*}Defunct National Olympic Committees (NOCs) or historical teams are shown in italic.

==== Women ====
Last updated after the 2026 Women's Beach Handball World Championships (As of 28 June 2026)
		Beach handball		Number of			
		World Games	World Championships	Number of			
Rk.	Nation	Women	Women	1st place, gold medalist(s)	2nd place, silver medalist(s)	3rd place, bronze medalist(s)	Total
1	Argentina	1st place, gold medalist(s)	1st place, gold medalist(s)	2	0	0	2
1	Brazil	1st place, gold medalist(s)	1st place, gold medalist(s)	2	0	0	2
1	Germany	1st place, gold medalist(s)	1st place, gold medalist(s)	2	0	0	2
4	Croatia	2nd place, silver medalist(s)	1st place, gold medalist(s)	1	1	0	2
4	Norway	2nd place, silver medalist(s)	1st place, gold medalist(s)	1	1	0	2
6	Italy	1st place, gold medalist(s)	3rd place, bronze medalist(s)	1	0	1	2
6	Spain	3rd place, bronze medalist(s)	1st place, gold medalist(s)	1	0	1	2
8	Hungary	2nd place, silver medalist(s)	2nd place, silver medalist(s)	0	2	0	2
9	Turkey	3rd place, bronze medalist(s)	2nd place, silver medalist(s)	0	1	1	2
10	Greece		1st place, gold medalist(s)	1	0	0	1
10	Russia		1st place, gold medalist(s)	1	0	0	1
10	Ukraine	1st place, gold medalist(s)		1	0	0	1
13	Denmark		2nd place, silver medalist(s)	0	1	0	1
14	Netherlands		3rd place, bronze medalist(s)	0	0	1	1

^{*}Defunct National Olympic Committees (NOCs) or historical teams are shown in italic.

=== Field handball ===
Last updated after the 1966 IHF World Men's Outdoor Handball Championship (As of 16 December 2019)
		Field handball			Number of			
		Olympic Games	World Championships		Number of			
Rk.	Nation	Men	Men	Women	1st place, gold medalist(s)	2nd place, silver medalist(s)	3rd place, bronze medalist(s)	Total
1	Germany	1st place, gold medalist(s)	1st place, gold medalist(s)	3rd place, bronze medalist(s)	2	0	1	3
2	Austria	2nd place, silver medalist(s)	3rd place, bronze medalist(s)	2nd place, silver medalist(s)	0	2	1	3
3	Romania		2nd place, silver medalist(s)	1st place, gold medalist(s)	1	1	0	2
3	West Germany^{*}		1st place, gold medalist(s)	2nd place, silver medalist(s)	1	1	0	2
5	Hungary		3rd place, bronze medalist(s)	1st place, gold medalist(s)	1	0	1	2
6	Switzerland	3rd place, bronze medalist(s)	2nd place, silver medalist(s)		0	1	1	2
7	Czechoslovakia^{*}		3rd place, bronze medalist(s)	3rd place, bronze medalist(s)	0	0	2	2
8	East Germany^{*}		1st place, gold medalist(s)		1	0	0	1
8	Sweden		1st place, gold medalist(s)		1	0	0	1
10	Denmark		2nd place, silver medalist(s)		0	1	0	1

^{*}Defunct National Olympic Committees (NOCs) or historical teams are shown in italic.

== See also ==
- List of major achievements in sports by nation
