= Joseph McVein =

American handball player

Joe McVein
Personal information
- Full name: Joseph Dean McVein
- Nationality: United States
- Born: December 7, 1956 (age 69) Sumter, South Carolina, U.S.
- Height: 6 ft 2 in (1.88 m)

Sport
- Sport: Handball
Medal record
Men's handball
Representing the United States
Pan American Games
Gold medal – first place	1987 Indianapolis	Team
Goodwill Games
Silver medal – second place	1986 Moscow	Team

Joseph Dean McVein (born December 7, 1956, in Sumter, South Carolina) is an American former handball player who competed in the 1984 Summer Olympics and in the 1988 Summer Olympics. He also graduated from Mission San Jose High School.
