= Scott Driggers =

American handball player

Personal information
- Full name: Scott L. Driggers
- Nationality: United States
- Born: September 11, 1962 (age 64) Pensacola, Florida, U.S.
- Height: 6 ft 5 in (1.95 m)

Sport
- Sport: Handball
- Position: Goalkeeper
Medal record
Men's handball
Representing the United States
Goodwill Games
Silver medal – second place	1986 Moscow	Team
Pan American Games
Gold medal – first place	1987 Indianapolis	Team

Scott L. Driggers (born September 11, 1962 in Pensacola, Florida) is an American former handball player who competed in the 1988 Summer Olympics. He graduated from Colorado College and Harvard Business School.
