= Boyd Janny =

American handball player

Personal information
- Full name: Boyd Michael Janny
- Nationality: United States
- Born: January 20, 1964 (age 62) Oconomowoc, Wisconsin, U.S.
- Height: 6 ft 6 in (1.98 m)

Sport
- Sport: Handball
Medal record
Men's handball
Representing the United States
Goodwill Games
| Silver medal – second place | 1986 Moscow | Team |
Pan American Games
| Gold medal – first place | 1987 Indianapolis | Team |

Boyd Michael Janny (born January 20, 1964) is an American former handball player who competed in the 1988 Summer Olympics.
