= National team appearances in the World Men's Field Handball Championship =

This article lists the performances of each of the 22 national teams which have made at least one appearance in the IHF World Men's Outdoor Handball Championship finals.

== Debut of teams ==
Each successive World Women's Handball Championship has had at least one team appearing for the first time. Teams in parentheses are considered successor teams by IHF.

Year	Debutants	Total
1938	Denmark; Germany; Hungary; Netherlands; Luxembourg; Poland; Romania; Switzerland; Sweden; Czechoslovakia	10
1948	Austria; Belgium; Finland; France; Portugal	5
1952	Spain; Saar	2
1955	Norway; Yugoslavia	2
1959		0
1963	West Germany; East Germany; Israel; United States	4
1966		0

== Participation details ==
Legend

- 1st – Champions
- 2nd – Runners-up
- 3rd – Third place
- 4th – Fourth place
- 5-10th – Fifth to tenth place
- IR – Intermediary round
- PR – Preliminary round
- •• — Qualified but withdrew
- • — Did not qualify
- × — Did not enter
- — Hosts
- flag — Part of corresponding country.

For each tournament, the number of teams in each finals tournament (in brackets) are shown.

Team	(Germany); 1938 (10)	(France); 1948 (12)	(Switzerland); 1952 (10)	(West Germany); 1955 (17)	(Austria); 1959 (7)	(Switzerland); 1963 (8)	(Austria); 1966 (6)	Total
Austria	(Germany)	IR	4th	7th	4th	5th	3rd	6
Belgium	×	PR	•	PR	•	×	×	2
Czechoslovakia	6th	×	×	3rd	×	×	×	2
Denmark	8th	2nd	5th	PR	6th	×	×	5
Finland	×	PR	×	PR	×	×	×	2
France	×	4th	PR	8th	•	×	×	3
/ (West) Germany	1st	×	1st	1st	1st	2nd	1st	6
East Germany	(Germany)	×	×	×	(Germany)	1st	2nd	2
Hungary	3rd	PR	×	PR	7th	×	×	4
Israel	×	×	×	×	×	7th	×	1
Luxembourg	10th	PR	•	PR	×	×	×	3
Netherlands	9th	IR	6th	PR	×	6th	6th	5
Norway	×	×	•	PR	×	×	×	1
Poland	7th	IR	×	×	•	4th	4th	4
Portugal	×	IR	•	PR	×	×	×	2
Romania	5th	×	×	×	2nd	×	×	2
Saar	(Germany)	(France)	PR	6th	(Germany)	(West Germany)		2
Spain	×	×	PR	PR	••	×	×	2
Sweden	4th	1st	2nd	4th	3rd	×	×	5
Switzerland	2nd	3rd	3rd	2nd	5th	3rd	5th	7
United States	×	×	×	×	×	8th	×	1
Yugoslavia	×	×	•	5th	•	×	×	1

== Results of host nations ==
Year	Host nation	Finish
1938	Germany	Champions
1948	France	Fourth Place
1952	Switzerland	Third Place
1955	West Germany	Champions
1959	Austria	Fourth Place
1963	Switzerland	Third Place
1966	Austria	Third Place

== Results of defending champions ==
Year	Defending champions	Finish
1938	—	—
1948	Germany	Did not enter
1952	Sweden	Runners-up
1955	West Germany	Champions
1959	Germany (United team of East and West Germany)	Champions
1963	East Germany	Champions
1963	West Germany	Runners-up
1966	East Germany	Runners-up
