= Gregory Morava =

American handball player (born 1959)

Greg Morava
Personal information
- Full name: Gregory Eugene Morava
- Born: February 9, 1959 (age 67) Chicago, Illinois, U.S.
- Height: 6 ft (1.8 m)

Sport
- Sport: Handball
Medal record
Men's handball
Representing the United States
Goodwill Games
Silver medal – second place	1986 Moscow	Team
Pan American Games
Gold medal – first place	1987 Indianapolis	Team

Gregory Eugene Morava (born February 9, 1959, in Chicago) is an American former handball player who competed in the 1984 Summer Olympics.
