= Holger Winselmann =

German handball player (born 1963)

Personal information
- Nationality: German
- Born: 11 November 1963 (age 62) Magdeburg, East Germany

Sport
- Sport: Handball
- Position: Right wing

Senior clubs
- Years: Team
- –: SC Magdeburg
National team
- Years: Team
- –: East Germany
- –: Germany

Holger Winselmann (born 11 November 1963) is a German handball player.

== Professional career ==
He competed at the 1988 Summer Olympics and the 1992 Summer Olympics. He played both for the East German and unified German national teams.
