= Kushniryuk =

Kushniriuk or Kushniryuk is a Ukrainian patronymic surname derived from the occupation kushnir, "furrier" and literally meaning "son of furrier". Notable people with the surname include:

- Serhiy Kushniryuk
- Vitaly Kushniriuk ( born 1947) Ukrainian painter
