= Rod Oshita =

American handball player (1959–2025)

Personal information
- Full name: Rodney Kenji Oshita
- Nationality: United States
- Born: June 25, 1959 Los Angeles, California, U.S.
- Died: March 25, 2025 (aged 65)
- Height: 6 ft 6 in (1.98 m)

Sport
- Sport: Handball
- Position: Goalkeeper
Medal record
Men's handball
Representing the United States
Goodwill Games
Silver medal – second place	1986 Moscow	Team
Pan American Games
Gold medal – first place	1987 Indianapolis	Team

Rodney Kenji Oshita (June 25, 1959 – March 25, 2025) was an American handball player who competed in the 1984 Summer Olympics and in the 1988 Summer Olympics.

Oshita played Water Polo growing up and competed collegiately for UC Irvine. He was a member of the USA Team Handball National Team from 1982 to 1988, competing at two Olympic Games as well as winning gold at the 1987 Pan American Games and silver at the 1986 Goodwill Games. Oshita served on the board for the United States Team Handball Foundation, which was established after the 1984 Summer Olympics. He died on March 25, 2025, at the age of 65.
