= IHF World Handball Championship =

IHF World Handball Championship may refer to

== Indoor handball ==
- IHF World Men's Handball Championship
- IHF World Women's Handball Championship
- IHF Men's Junior World Championship
- IHF Women's Junior World Championship
- IHF Men's Youth World Championship
- IHF Women's Youth World Championship
- (World University Handball Championship) Not from the IHF

== Beach handball ==
- Beach Handball World Championships

== Field/Outdoor handball ==
- IHF World Men's Outdoor Handball Championship
- IHF World Women's Outdoor Handball Championship
