= Oshita =

Oshita, Ōshita, Ooshita or Ohshita (written: 大下) is a Japanese surname. Notable people with the surname include:

- Gerald Oshita (1942–1992), American musician, composer, and sound recordist
- Hiroshi Ohshita (大下 弘, 1922–1979), Japanese baseball player and manager
- Rod Oshita (1959–2025), American handball player
- Yukiharu Oshita (大下 幸治, born 1949), Japanese water polo player
