= Peter Hofmann (handballer) =

German handball player (born 1955)

Personal information
- Nationality: East Germany
- Born: 17 October 1955 (age 71) Leipzig
- Height: 185 cm (73 in)

Sport
- Sport: Handball
- Position: Goalkeeper

Senior clubs
- Years: Team
- -1990: SC Leipzig
- 1990-?: SG Wallau-Massenheim
- –: HSC Bad Neustadt
National team
| Years | Team | Apps |
| ?-? | East Germany | 148 |

Peter Hofmann (born 17 October 1955) is a former East German male handball player. He was a member of the East Germany national handball team. He was part of the team at the 1988 Summer Olympics. On club level he played for SC Leipzig in Leipzig.
