= 1970 World Men's Handball Championship – qualification =

Qualification matches for the 1970 World Men's Handball Championship took place in 1969.

== Europe and Africa ==
The draw took place on 15 March in Basel, Switzerland.

=== Draw ===
Pot 1 (seeded) (WC 67)	Pot 2 (unseeded)
Soviet Union (4); Sweden (5); West Germany (6); Yugoslavia (7); Hungary (8); East Germany (9); Poland (12); Norway (13); Switzerland (14); Iceland (Not participate)	Spain; Finland; Portugal; Belgium; Netherlands; Austria; Israel; Morocco; Bulgaria; Luxembourg

=== East Germany – Israel ===
15. November 1969	East Germany	35–2	Israel	Schwerin
15. November 1969	Reiner Ganschow (13)	(19–2)		Schwerin

Israel	0–5	East Germany	Kfar Giladi; Referees: ? (ROU)
	(forfeit)		Kfar Giladi; Referees: ? (ROU)

The second game between East Germany and Israel was a forfeit loss because Israel had not a correct handball hall. This was decided by executive committee of the IHF at the weekend 29–30 November 1969.

In Tel Aviv was only an outdoor small field handball place available and the hall in Kfar Giladi had not the official handball court dimensions of 20×40 meter.

On 28 November 1969 the Israel Handball Association found an alternative place but it was too late.

The Israel Handball Association made a protest against the decision of the IHF. They said the dimensions were correct and on Tuesday two officials of the East Germany team and the two referees had no complains against the field. The Israelis said there were political reasons that the Germany didn't travel to Israel.

On 21 December 1969 the IHF rejected the protest.

In einer gemeinsamen Sitzung des Büros der IHF am 21. Dezember 1969 in Basel mit Vertretern Ostdeutschland und Israel wurde nach eingehender Beratung entschieden, daß das Rückspiel Israel – Ostdeutschland für die Endrundenqualifikation der Hallenhandball-Weltmeisterschaft 1970 wegen Nichterfüllung der technischen Voraussetzungen entsprechend dem geltenden WM-Reglement nicht stattfinden konnte und damit nicht gewertet wird. Ostdeutschland ist auf Grunde des regulären Vorspielergebinsses von 35:2 für die Endrunde der Weltmeisterschaft in Frankreich qualifiziert. Dem Protest von Israel konnte nicht stattgegeben werden.

— IHF
Translation:

In a joint meeting of the IHF office in Basel on December 21, 1969 with representatives of East Germany and Israel, it was decided after detailed consultation that the return leg Israel - East Germany for the final qualification of the 1970 Indoor Handball World Cup due to non-fulfillment of the technical requirements in accordance with the current World Cup Regulations could not take place and are therefore not evaluated. East Germany is qualified for the finals of the World Cup in France due to the regular lead win of 35: 2. The Israeli protest could not be accepted.

=== Hungary – Bulgaria ===
15. November 1969	Hungary	29–11	Bulgaria	Játékcsarnok, Budapest
15. November 1969		(15–6)		Játékcsarnok, Budapest

30. November 1969	Bulgaria	15–23	Hungary	Sofia
30. November 1969		(8–12)		Sofia

=== Iceland – Austria ===
List of games form Iceland: 15.11.1969 and 7.12.1969

15 November 1969	Iceland	28–10	Austria	Reykjavík; Referees: Nilsson & Pettersson (NOR)
15 November 1969	Geir Hallsteinsson (7)	(12–2)	Patzer (4)	Reykjavík; Referees: Nilsson & Pettersson (NOR)
15 November 1969		Report,		Reykjavík; Referees: Nilsson & Pettersson (NOR)

7 December 1969; 17:00	Austria	21–20	Iceland	Wiener Stadthalle, Vienna
7 December 1969; 17:00		(11–8)		Wiener Stadthalle, Vienna

=== Norway – Belgium ===
16. November 1969; 18:30	Norway	26–6	Belgium	Oslo
16. November 1969; 18:30	Per Graver (8)	(15–2)		Oslo
16. November 1969; 18:30		Report		Oslo

30. November 1969	Belgium	6–35	Norway
30. November 1969		Report	Per Graver (11)

=== Poland – Morocco ===
Morocco gave forfeit. First was Morocco directly qualified for the World championship, one year later the IHF recall this decision.

=== Soviet Union – Finland ===
16. November 1969	Soviet Union	22–10	Finland	Leningrad or Moscow (Note: According to the Russian book in Leningrad. According to the Swiss newsletter in Moscow.)
16. November 1969		(11–6)		Leningrad or Moscow

30. November 1969	Finland	19–33	Soviet Union	Helsinki

=== Sweden – Portugal ===
Portugal gave forfeit

=== Switzerland – Luxembourg ===
15. November 1969	Switzerland	11–10	Luxembourg	Steinli, Möhlin; Attendance: 1.800
15. November 1969	Hansjürg Rudolf (5)	(5–7)		Steinli, Möhlin; Attendance: 1.800
15. November 1969		Report		Steinli, Möhlin; Attendance: 1.800

29. November 1969	Luxembourg	9–22	Switzerland	Differdange; Attendance: 1.200
29. November 1969		(1–12)	Willy Glaus (6)	Differdange; Attendance: 1.200
29. November 1969		Report		Differdange; Attendance: 1.200

=== West Germany – Netherlands ===
28. November 1969	Netherlands	16–16	West Germany	Utrecht
28. November 1969		(9–10)	Herbert Hönnige & Hans-Günther Schmidt (3)	Utrecht

30. November 1969	West Germany	22–10	Netherlands	Münster; Attendance: 5.000
30. November 1969	Max Müller	(9–6)		Münster; Attendance: 5.000

=== Yugoslavia – Spain ===
15 November 1969	Yugoslavia	28–14	Spain	Pančevo

29 November 1969	Spain	15–26	Yugoslavia	Vigo

== North America ==
In March Die Tat from Switzerland wrote that Canada and the United States were already qualified.

15. November 1969	United States	17–21	Canada Edmonton International Handball Club	Livingston, New Jersey

30. November 1969	Canada	19–17	United States	Toronto
30. November 1969	Mario Savage (7)		Vince Drake (9)	Toronto

The USA submitted a protest in December after a research of a private investigator because the Canadian Eric Jacobsen is Danish and has not a passport from Canada. On 21 December 1969 the protest was rejected because of missing evidence by the IHF. In January the USA was able to prove the claimed and Canada was disqualified. Therefore the Spanish team should be the substitute. But they rejected because they have no time to build a good team again. On 28 January 1970 the former rival USA was taken as replacement.
