= Peter Pysall =

German handball player (born 1960)

Personal information
- Nationality: East German
- Born: 26 June 1960 (age 66) Heilbad Heiligenstadt, East Germany

Sport
- Sport: Handball
- Position: Centerback

Senior clubs
- Years: Team
- 1974–1990: SC Magdeburg
- 1990–6/1992: SG Leutershausen
- 6/1992–1993: SC Magdeburg
National team
Years	Team	Apps
–	East Germany	155

Teams managed
- –: SC Magdeburg (assistant)
- 2/1998–3/2000: TSV Bayer Dormagen
- 2000–3/2004: SG Leutershausen
- 2004–2005: SV Post Schwerin
- 2005–2007: HSV Insel Usedom
- 2007–2011: Dessau-Roßlauer HV
- 2012–2015: HC Elbflorenz
- 2017–2020: Glinder HV Eintracht
- 2020–: SV Eiche 05 Biederitz

Peter Pysall (born 26 June 1960) is a former East German handball player and current coach. He competed in the men's tournament at the 1988 Summer Olympics.

With SC Magdeburg he won several DDR Championships, 1 DDR Cup and the 1981 European Cup.
