= Mikhail Vasilyev =

Mikhail Vasilyev may refer to:

- Mikhail Vasilyev (explorer) (1770–1847), Russian explorer and vice admiral of the Imperial Russian Navy
- Mikhail Vasilyev (handballer) (1961–2025), Russian handball player
