= Fitschen =

Fitschen is a surname. Notable people with the surname include:

- Craig Fitschen (born 1967), American handball player
- Doris Fitschen (1968–2025), German footballer
- Jan Fitschen (born 1977), German long-distance runner
- Jürgen Fitschen (born 1948), German banker
