= Ricardo Marín =

Ricardo Marín may refer to:

- Ricardo Marín (footballer) (born 1998), Mexican footballer
- Ricardo Marín (handballer) (born 1968), Spanish handball player
