= Steven Goss =

American handball player

Steve Goss
Personal information
- Full name: Steven James Goss
- Nationality: United States
- Born: August 29, 1960 (age 66) Castro Valley, California, U.S.
- Height: 6 ft (1.8 m)

Sport
- Sport: Handball
Medal record
Men's handball
Representing the United States
Goodwill Games
Silver medal – second place	1986 Moscow	Team
Pan American Games
Gold medal – first place	1987 Indianapolis	Team

Steven James Goss (born August 29, 1960) is an American former handball player who competed in the 1984 Summer Olympics and in the 1988 Summer Olympics.
