= 1970 World Men's Handball Championship =

Tournament details
- Host country: France
- Dates: 26 February-8 March
- Teams: 16

Final positions
- Champions: Romania
- Runner-up: East Germany
- Third place: Yugoslavia

Tournament statistics
- Matches played: 42
- Goals scored: 1,262 (30.05 per match)

The 1970 World Men's Handball Championship was the seventh team handball World Championship. It was held in France between 26 February-8 March 1970. Romania won the championship.

== Qualification ==
Competition	Dates	Vacancies	Qualified
Host nations		1	France
1967 World Championship	12–21 January 1967	3	Czechoslovakia; Denmark; Romania
Asia		1	Japan
Europe and Africa Qualification	15 November – 7 December 1969	10	East Germany; Hungary; Iceland; Norway; Poland; Soviet Union; Sweden; Switzerland; West Germany; Yugoslavia
North America Qualification	15–30 November 1969	1	United States^{1}

^{1}First Canada was qualified but was disqualified because they used a Danish player.

== Results ==
=== Preliminary round ===
GROUP A

Date	Venue	Game	Res.	Half
26 Feb	Saint-Nazaire	East Germany - Soviet Union	13-11	(8-6)
26 Feb	Quimper	Sweden - Norway	8-6	(5-2)
28 Feb	Rennes	Soviet Union - Norway	10-9	(5-4)
28 Feb	Rennes	Sweden - East Germany	11-9	(5-4)
1 Mar	Nantes	East Germany - Norway	10-8	(5-3)
1 Mar	Nantes	Soviet Union - Sweden	12-11	(6-5)

Group A	Games	Goals	Points
Sweden	3	30-27	4
East Germany	3	32-30	4
Soviet Union	3	33-33	4
Norway	3	23-28	0

GROUP B

Date	Venue	Game	Res.	Half
26 Feb	Bayonne	Czechoslovakia - Japan	19-9	(8-2)
26 Feb	Angoulême	Yugoslavia- USA	34-8	(22-3)
28 Feb	Agen	Czechoslovakia - USA	23-9	(13-5)
28 Feb	Agen	Yugoslavia - Japan	17-17	(10-8)
1 Mar	Toulouse	Japan - USA	21-15	(10-7)
1 Mar	Toulouse	Czechoslovakia - Yugoslavia	16-15	(8-11)

Group B	Games	Goals	Points
Czechoslovakia	3	58-33	6
Yugoslavia	3	66-41	3
Japan	3	47-51	3
United States	3	32-78	0

GROUP C

Date	Venue	Game	Res.	Half
26 Feb	Paris	Romania - France	12-9	(7-2)
26 Feb	Rouen	West Germany - Switzerland	11-10	(7-3)
28 Feb	Amiens	Romania - Switzerland	22-7	(9-6)
28 Feb	Évreux	West Germany - France	15-12	(10-6)
1 Mar	Caen	France - Switzerland	15-12	(7-3)
1 Mar	Caen	West Germany - Romania	15-14	(5-9)

Group C	Games	Goals	Points
West Germany	3	41-36	6
Romania	3	48-31	4
France	3	36-39	2
Switzerland	3	29-48	0

GROUP D

Date	Venue	Game	Res.	Half
26 Feb	Longwy	Denmark - Poland	23-16	(10-6)
26 Feb	Mulhouse	Hungary - Iceland	19-9	(9-3)
28 Feb	Hagondange	Denmark - Iceland	19-13	(9-6)
28 Feb	Strasbourg	Hungary- Poland	15-9	(4-4)
1 Mar	Metz	Iceland - Poland	21-18	(14-9)
1 Mar	Metz	Hungary - Denmark	24-19	(13-6)

Group D	Games	Goals	Points
Hungary	3	58-37	6
Denmark	3	61-53	4
Iceland	3	43-56	2
Poland	3	43-59	0

=== Placement Round (9-12 pos.) ===
The four third placed teams from the preliminary round played a round robin tournament for positions 9-12.

Date	Venue	Game	Res.	Half
3 Mar	Paris	Soviet Union - France	25-14	(13-7)
3 Mar	Creil	Japan - Iceland	20-19	(12-9)
4 Mar	Paris	Soviet Union - Iceland	19-15	(8-5)
5 Mar	Paris	Japan - France	22-13	(13-7)
6 Mar	Paris	Soviet Union - Japan	28-12	(11-6)
6 Mar	Paris	Iceland - France	19-17	(12-10)

Placement Round		Games	Goals	Points
9.	Soviet Union	3	72-41	6
10.	Japan	3	54-60	4
11.	Iceland	3	53-56	2
12.	France	3	44-66	0

=== Main Round ===
The top two finishers from each preliminary round group progressed to the quarter-finals. The winners progressed to the semi-final stage, while losers played for positions 5-8.

Quarter-finals

Date	Venue	Game	Res.	Half
3 Mar	Paris	Romania - Sweden	15-13	(10-6)
3 Mar	Orléans	East Germany - West Germany	18-17• ET 16-16	(11-8)
3 Mar	Besançon	Denmark - Czechoslovakia	18-16	(10-7)
3 Mar	Grenoble	Yugoslavia - Hungary	11-10	(5-6)

Semi-finals

Date	Venue	Game	Res.	Half
5 Mar	Lyon	Romania - Denmark	18-12	(9-6)
5 Mar	Bordeaux	East Germany - Yugoslavia	17-13	(8-6)

Bronze medal game

Date	Venue	Game	Res.	Half
7 Mar	Paris	Yugoslavia - Denmark	29-12	(13-6)

Final

Date	Venue	Game	Res.	Half
8 Mar	Paris	Romania - East Germany	13-12 (after extra time)	(4-5) 10-10 (11-11 during extra time)

==== Positions 5-8 ====
Semi-Final Round

Date	Venue	Game	Res.	Half
5 Mar	Évreux	Sweden - Czechoslovakia	12-11	(5-7)
5 Mar	Troyes	West Germany - Hungary	15-13	(8-7)

7-8 pos.

Date	Venue	Game	Res.	Half
7 Mar	Paris	Czechoslovakia- Hungary	21-14	(12-4)

5-6 pos.

Date	Venue	Game	Res.	Half
7 Mar	Paris	West Germany - Sweden	15-14	(8-8)

Source: International Handball Federation

== Final standings ==
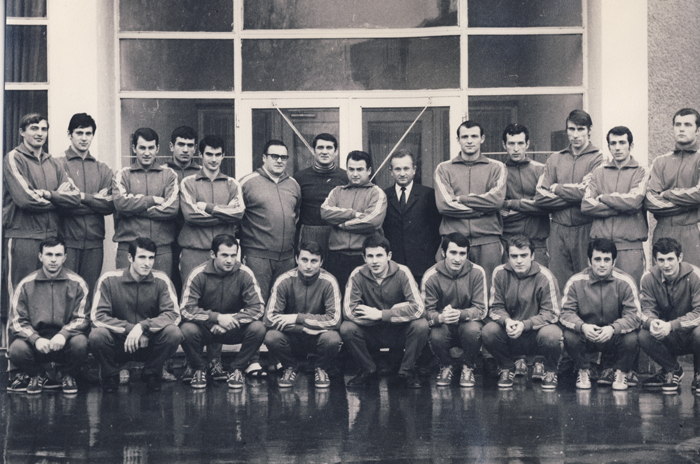
The national team of Romania, world champions in 1970

Places 1–8 were decided by play–off or knock–out. Places 9–12 were decide by a placement round. Teams finishing fourth in the preliminary round are ranked 13 to 16. In case of a tie in points gained, the goal difference of the preliminary round were taken into account.

Rank	Team
1st place, gold medalist(s)	Romania
2nd place, silver medalist(s)	East Germany
3rd place, bronze medalist(s)	Yugoslavia
4	Denmark
5	West Germany
6	Sweden
7	Czechoslovakia
8	Hungary
9	Soviet Union
10	Japan
11	Iceland
12	France
13	Norway
14	Poland
15	Switzerland
16	United States
