= Craig Fitschen =

American handball player

Personal information
- Full name: Craig Steven Fitschen
- Nationality: United States
- Born: January 17, 1967 (age 59) Syosset, New York, U.S.
- Height: 6 ft (1.8 m)

Sport
- Sport: Handball
Medal record
Men's handball
Representing the United States
Goodwill Games
Silver medal – second place	1986 Moscow	Team
Pan American Games
Bronze medal – third place	1991 Havana	Team

Craig Steven Fitschen (born January 17, 1967) is an American former handball player who competed in the 1988 Summer Olympics.
