= Zbigniew Gawlik =

Polish handball player (born 1956)

Personal information
- Nationality: Polish
- Born: 1 July 1956 (age 70) Kraków, Poland
- Height: 1.80 m (5 ft 11 in)

Sport
- Sport: Handball
- Position: Left wing

Senior clubs
- Years: Team
- 1972–1985: Hutnik Kraków
- 1985–1994: UHC Stockerau
National team
Years	Team	Apps	(Gls)
1978–1988	Poland	141	(194)
Medal record
World Championship
Bronze medal – third place	1982 West Germany

Zbigniew Gawlik (born 1 July 1956) is a former Polish handball player who competed in the 1980 Summer Olympics and at the 1982 World Men's Handball Championship..

In 1980 he was part of the Polish team which finished seventh in the Olympic tournament.
