= Rüdiger Borchardt =

German handball player (born 1963)

Personal information
- Nationality: German
- Born: 8 December 1963 (age 62) Wismar, Germany
- Height: 198 cm (78 in)

Sport
- Sport: Handball
- Position: Right back

Youth career
- Years: Team
- –1976: TSG Wismar
- 1976–1982: SC Empor Rostock

Senior clubs
- Years: Team
- 1982–1990: SC Empor Rostock
- 1990–1991: GWD Minden
- 1991–1992: VfL Bad Schwartau
- 1992–1998: SC Empor Rostock
National team
Years	Team	Apps	(Gls)
1984–1990	East Germany	139	(668)
1990–?	Germany	15	(22)

Rüdiger Borchardt (born 8 December 1963) is a German handball player, who represented both the East German and German national teams. For East Germany, he competed in the men's tournament at the 1988 Summer Olympics and the 1986 and 1990 World Championships.

In the 1980s he was one of the best East German players, when he played for SC Empor Rostock. He was the topscorer in the DDR Oberliga in both the 1988-89 season (141 goals) and in the 1989-1990 season (149 goals). After the fall of the Berlin Wall he joined GWD Minden in the 2nd Handball-Bundesliga, and in 1991 he joined VfL Bad Schwartau. In 1992 he returned to SC Empor Rostock.
