= Mohamed Machou =

Algerian handball player (born 1958)

Personal information
- Nationality: Algerian
- Born: 25 June 1958 (age 66)

Sport
- Sport: Handball

Mohamed Machou (born 25 June 1958) is an Algerian handball player. He competed in the men's tournament at the 1980 Summer Olympics.
