= Toshiyuki Yamamura =

Japanese handball player (born 1964)

Toshiyuki Yamamura (山村敏之, Yamamura Toshiyuki, born 9 July 1964) is a Japanese former handball player who competed in the 1988 Summer Olympics.
