= Mikhail Vasilyev (handballer) =

Russian handball player (1961–2025)

Medal record

Men's handball

Representing Soviet Union

Olympic Games
Gold medal – first place	1988 Seoul	Team

World Championships
Gold medal – first place	1982 West Germany	Team

Mikhail Anatolyevich Vasilyev (Russian: Михаил Анатольевич Васильев; 4 March 1961 – 25 February 2025) was a Russian handball player who competed for the Soviet Union in the 1988 Summer Olympics.

In 1988, he won the gold medal with the Soviet team where he played all six matches and scored five goals. On 5 March 2025, it was announced that Vasilyev had died at the age of 64.
