= International Amateur Handball Federation =

International organisation for several sports

- Abbreviation: IAHF
- Predecessor: International Association of Athletics Federations
- Successor: International Basketball Federation 1934; International Handball Federation 1946; International Volleyball Federation 1947
- Formation: 4 August 1928; 98 years ago; during the Summer Olympics
- Founded at: Amsterdam, Netherlands
- Dissolved: between 10 July 1946 and 13 July 1946; 80 years ago
- Type: International Sports Federation
- Headquarters: Munich, Germany
- Coordinates: 48.15597°N 11.5114813°E
- Region served: Worldwide
- Fields: American handball; Basketball; Field handball; Indoor handball; Volleyball

The International Amateur Handball Federation (IAHF) was the administrative and controlling body for handball and field handball. IAHF was responsible for the organisation of handball's major international tournaments, notably the World Men's Handball Championship, which commenced in 1938, and the World Men's Outdoor Handball Championship, which commenced in 1938. The organisation was dissolved after World War II.

== History ==
On 13 September 1925 the first international field handball game between Germany and Austria happened. Because of this event, uniform rules and an international association were desired.

In 1926, the International Amateur Athletics Federation (IAAF, now known as World Athletics) created a commission to govern all ball games played with the hands, such as field-handball, court-handball, volleyball and basketball. In the same year the first international field handball rules were created in The Hague.

Two years later during the 1928 Summer Olympics the IAAF invited national representatives to create an independent federation. Representatives from 11 countries founded the International Amateur Handball Federation on 4 August 1928 in Amsterdam. The later IOC president Avery Brundage and Lauri Pihkala how invented Pesäpallo were founding members.

The International Olympic Committee recognized handball as Olympic sport in 1933. Three years later during the 1936 Summer Olympics field handball had its first and last appearance at the Summer Olympics. At this point IAHF had 23 members.

In 1938 the first Outdoor and Indoor World Men's Handball Championship were organised by the IAHF.

In 1946 the successor the International Handball Federation was founded by Denmark and Sweden and the IAHF was dissvolved during the first IHF congress between 10 and 13 July 1946. Because the IAHF was under strong influence of Germany the members dissvolved the IAHF and found the IHF.

== Basketball ==
In 1934, oversight of basketball was transferred to the Fédération Internationale de Basketball (FIBB, now abbreviated FIBA).

== Volleyball ==
The first (failed) attempt to create an independent volleyball federation at the 1934 IAHF congress in Stockholm. During a friendly match between the Czech and French national teams on 26 August 1946 the two nations and Poland created a document to create an international federation. The following year 14 nations founded the FIVB in Paris between 18 and 20 April.

== Presidents ==
	Name	Country	Start	End	Comment
1.	Franz-Paul Lang	Germany	1928	1931	President of Deutschen Sportbehörde für Athletik
interim	Karl Ritter von Halt	Germany	1931	1934	IOC member
2.	Karl Ritter von Halt	Germany	1934	1938	IOC member
3.	Richard Herrmann	Germany	1938	1941	Head of the Handball and Basketball department of NSRL
4.	unknown				

== Members ==
Following counties were member of the IAHF as of the 4th IAHF-Congress:

Country	Since	Until	Federation
Argentina	18 May 1930		Argentine Basketball Confederation
Austria	4 August 1928		Austrian Handball Federation
Belgium	30 August 1934	Between 30 August 1934 – 13 August 1936	
Brazil	18 May 1930		Brazilian Sports Confederation
Canada	4 August 1928		Amateur Athletic Union of Canada
Czechoslovakia	4 August 1928		Ceskoslovensky Svaz Hazené
Denmark	4 August 1928		Danish Athletics Federation
Egypt	18 May 1930		Union Egyptienne des Sociétés Sportives
Estonia	30 August 1934		Estonia Handball Association
Finland	4 August 1928	Between 30 August 1934 – 13 August 1936	
France	4 August 1928		French Athletics Federation (1930); French Handball Federation of Metz (1936)
Germany	4 August 1928		German Athletics Association (1930); NSRL (1936)
Greece	4 August 1928	Between 4 August 1928 – 18 May 1930	Hellenic Amateur Athletic Association
Haiti	30 August 1934		Fédération Haïtienne de Ballon à la Main Amateur
Hungary	18 May 1930		Hungarian Handball Federation
Ireland	4 August 1928		Irish Amateur Handball Association
Japan	18 May 1930		Japan Association of Athletics Federations
Luxembourg	30 August 1934		Luxembourg Athletics Federation
Netherlands	30 August 1934		Netherlands Handball Association
Poland	18 May 1930		Polski Zwiazek Gier Sportowych
Portugal	13 August 1936		Associacao Lisbonense de Hand-Ball
Romania	18 May 1930		Romanian Athletics Federation (1930); Romanian Handball Federation (1936)
Sweden	4 August 1928		Swedish Athletics Association (1930); Swedish Handball Federation (1936)
Switzerland	18 May 1930 (Note: According to a swiss source from 1952 they joined already in 1929.)		Swiss Gymnastics Federation (1929–1939); Schweizerischer Handballausschuss (1939–1946)
United States	4 August 1928		Amateur Athletic Union of the United States
Uruguay	30 August 1934		Centro Athletico «Gimnasia y Deportes»
Yugoslavia	30 August 1934	Between 30 August 1934 – 13 August 1936	
