= Serhiy Kushniryuk =

Soviet handball player

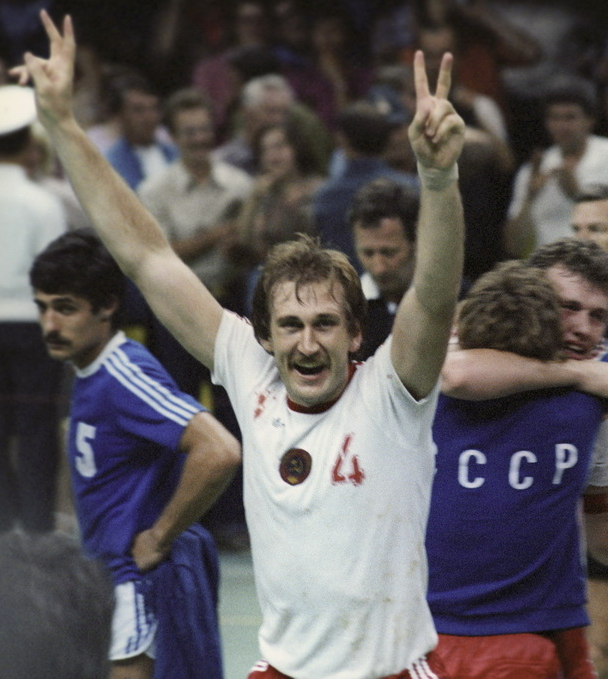
- Kushniryuk at the 1980 Olympics

Personal information
- Born: 15 March 1956 (age 70) Chortkiv, Ukraine
- Height: 202 cm (6 ft 8 in)
- Weight: 98 kg (216 lb)

Sport
- Sport: Team handball
- Club: Burevestnik Zaporizhzhia; CSKA Moscow
Medal record
Representing the Soviet Union
Olympic Games
Gold medal – first place	1976 Montreal	Team
Silver medal – second place	1980 Moscow	Team
World championship
Silver medal – second place	1978 Denmark	Team
Gold medal – first place	1982 West Germany	Team

Serhiy Georgievich Kushniryuk (Ukrainian: Сергій Георгійович Кушнiрюк; born 15 March 1956) is a retired Ukrainian handball player. He was part of the Soviet teams that won a gold medal at the 1976 Summer Olympics and placed second in 1980. He also won a gold and a silver medal at the world championships in 1978 and 1982.
