= Yury Kidyayev =

Soviet handball player

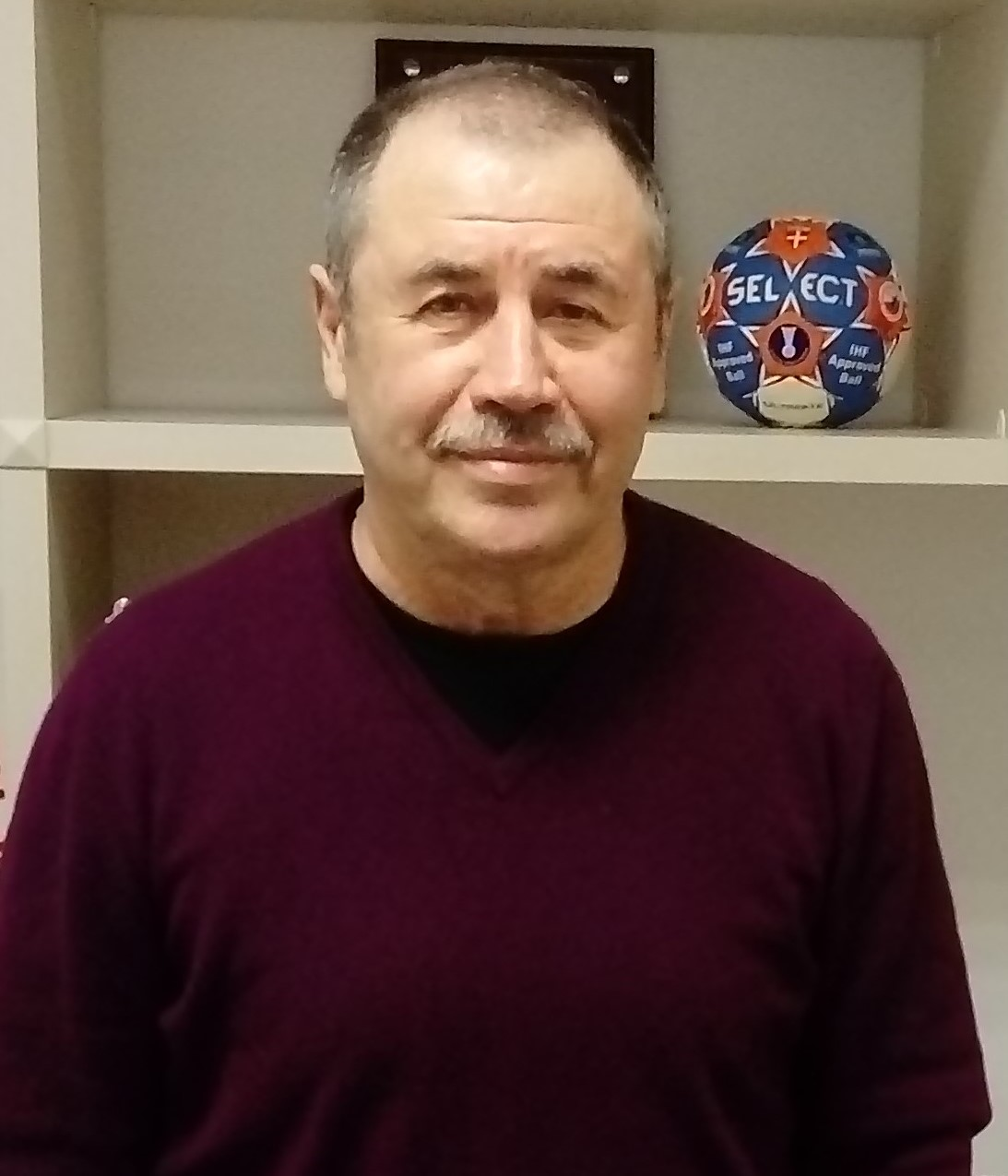

Medal record

Representing Soviet Union

Men's Handball

Olympic Games
Gold medal – first place	1976 Montreal	Team
Silver medal – second place	1980 Moscow	Team

World Championship
Silver medal – second place	1978 Denmark	Team

Yury Konstantinovich Kidyayev (Russian: Юрий Константинович Кидяев; born February 28, 1955, in Moscow) is a former Soviet/Russian handball player who competed in the 1976 Summer Olympics and in the 1980 Summer Olympics.

In 1976 he won the gold medal with the Soviet team. He played all six matches and scored fifteen goals.

Four years later he was part of the Soviet team which won the silver medal. He played five matches including the final and scored twelve goals.
