= Motoball =

Sport with motorcycles and a ball

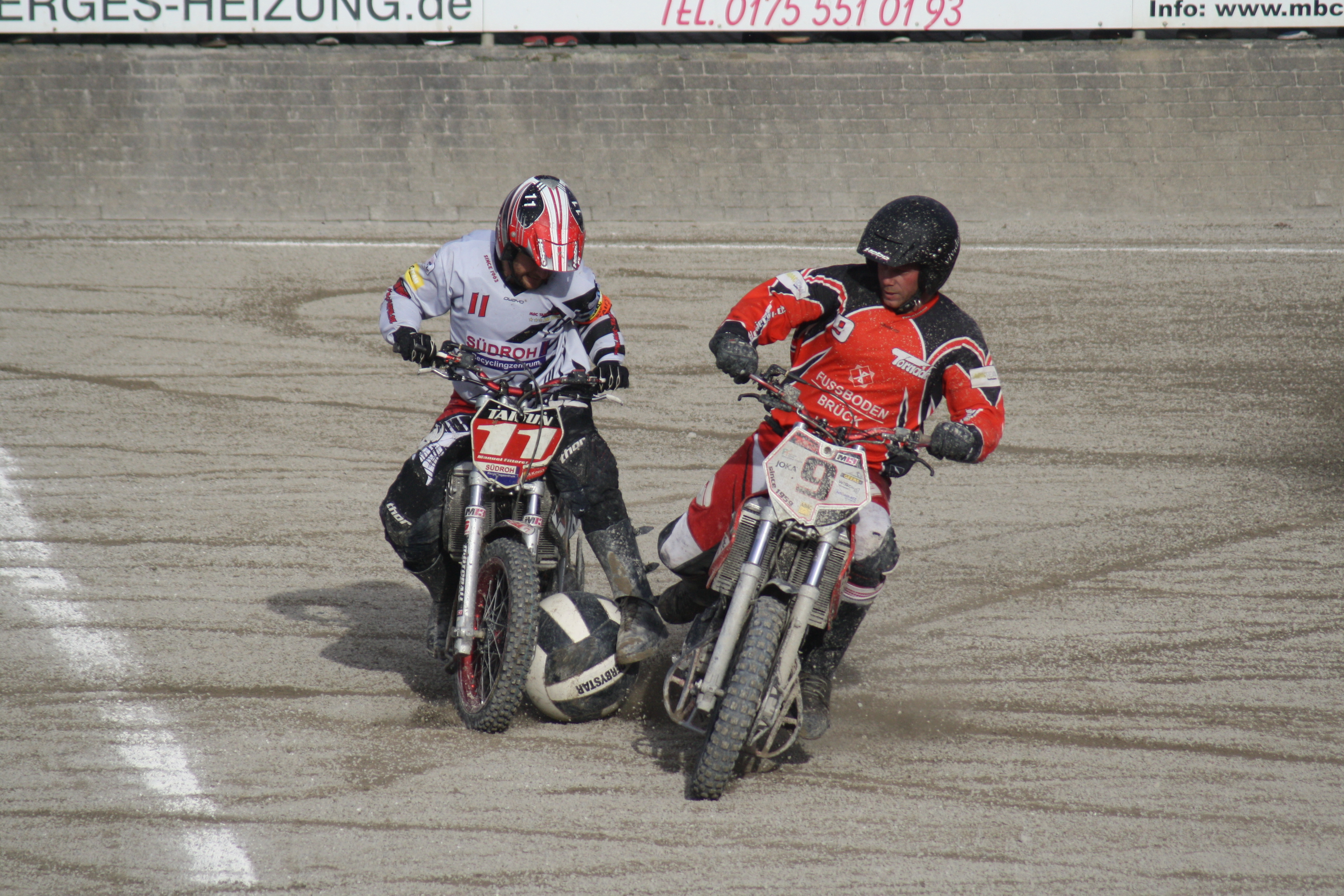
Motoball in Germany

Motoball (also known as motorcycle polo) is a team motorsport similar to association football, with the main differences being that all players (except goalkeepers) are riding motorcycles, and the ball is much bigger. It began as an officially organized sport in the mid-1920s or mid-1930s.

== Rules and regulations ==
Motoball is played in a 5v5 format. There are four players on motorcycles, and one on their feet as the goalkeeper. The matches are split up into four 20-minute periods. There is only one spot on the field the motorcycles are not allowed to go, which is the semicircle in front of the goal. The game is played with a ball nearly 40 centimetres (16 in) in diameter. The playing field is 100 metres (110 yd) long, and at the start each team is waiting at the back line Shin guards and helmets are used for protection against collisions initiated by the riders. The riders use special prepared GasGas two-stroke 250 cc motorcycles for the game. At the sides of the bike, special frames are mounted, so riders can pinch the ball between their bike and their leg.

== Commission of French Motoball ==
Pascale Reschko Jacquot has been president of the French Motoball Commission since 2012. In the latest FIM Europe Management Council, which was held in Fiumicino, Italy, she was appointed as president of the FIM Europe Motoball Commission. It was the first time in FIM Europe history that a woman was elected president of a European Commission. The commission of French Motoball is in charge of setting rule changes and hiring referees to officiate the games.

== Other events ==
Motoball was included in the inaugural Goodwill Games.

== European Championship ==
See: European Motoball Championship Results

=== Medals (1986-2025) ===
| Rank | Nation | Gold | Silver | Bronze | Total |
|---|---|---|---|---|---|
| 1 | Russia | 24 | 6 | 0 | 30 |
| 2 | Germany | 7 | 12 | 10 | 29 |
| 3 | France | 3 | 8 | 15 | 26 |
| 4 | Belarus | 1 | 7 | 6 | 14 |
| 5 | Lithuania | 0 | 1 | 1 | 2 |
| 5 | Ukraine | 0 | 1 | 1 | 2 |
| 7 | Netherlands | 0 | 0 | 2 | 2 |
| Totals (7 entries) | | 35 | 35 | 35 | 105 |
