= Aleksandr Artemyev =

Aleksandr Ivanovich Artemyev
- Александр Иванович Артемьев
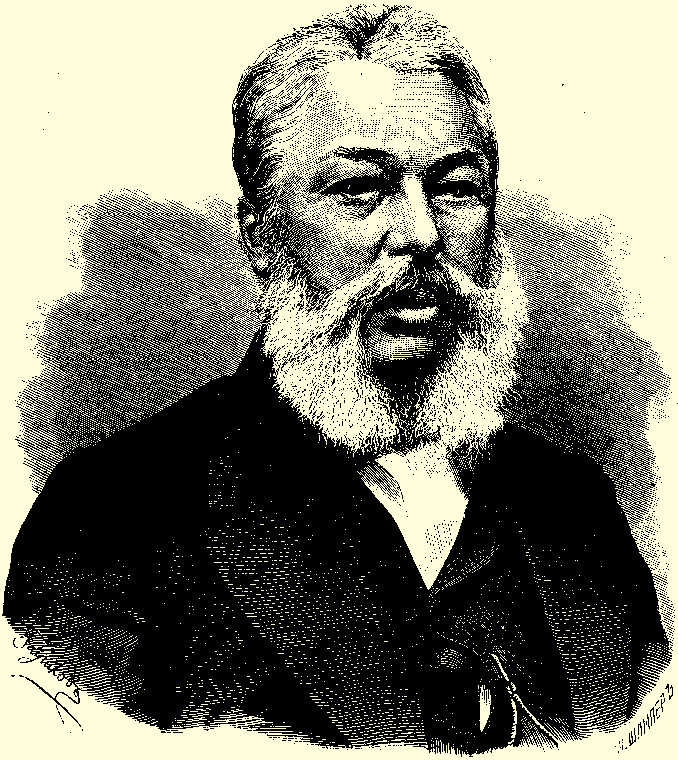
- Born: October 24, 1820; Khvalynsk, Saratov Governorate
- Died: September 29, 1874 (aged 53)
- Occupations: Statistician, archeologist, ethnographer, geographer

Aleksandr Ivanovich Artemyev (Russian: Александр Иванович Артемьев; October 24, 1820 – September 29, 1874) was a Russian statistician, archeologist, ethnographer and geographer; State Councillor, senior editor of the Central Statistical Committee, member of the Statistical Council of the Ministry of Internal Affairs of the Russian Empire.
