= Tomáš Bartek =

Czech handball player

Personal information
- Nationality: Czech (Czechoslovakia)
- Born: 29 July 1950 (age 76) Gottwaldov, Czechoslovakia
- Height: 192 cm (76 in)

Sport
- Sport: Handball
- Position: left back
National team
Years	Team	Apps	(Gls)
–	Czechoslovakia	151	(516)

Tomáš Bartek (born 24 February 1958 in Gottwaldov) is a Czech former handball player and handball coach. He competed in the 1988 Summer Olympics where the team finish 6th.
