= Abdelhak Bouhalissa =

Algerian handball player (born 1961)

Personal information
- Nationality: Algerian
- Born: 1 July 1961 (age 63)

Sport
- Sport: Handball

Abdelhak Bouhalissa (born 1 July 1961) is an Algerian handball player. He competed in the men's tournament at the 1988 Summer Olympics.
