= Makhlouf Aït Hocine =

Algerian handball player (born 1966)

Personal information
- Nationality: Algeria
- Born: 17 November 1966 (age 59)
- Height: 1.82 m (6 ft 0 in)
- Weight: 79 kg (174 lb)

Sport
- Sport: Handball

Makhlouf Aït Hocine (born 17 November 1966) is an Algerian handball player. He competed in the 1988 Summer Olympics.
