= Peder Järphag =

Swedish handball player (born 1964)

Personal information
- Full name: Owe Stellan Peder Järphag
- Nationality: Swedish
- Born: 24 January 1964 (age 62)
- Height: 191 cm (75 in)

Sport
- Sport: Handball
- Current club: Retired

Senior clubs
- Years: Team
- -1985: IK Sävehof
- 1985-1986: HP Warta
- 1986-1988: BM Granollers (Spain)
- 1988-1993: IK Sävehof
- 1988-1993: IK Sanna/Heim
National team
Years	Team	Apps
–	Sweden	78

Peder Järphag (born 24 January 1964) is a Swedish former handball player who competed in the 1988 Summer Olympics, where Sweden finished 5th. Järphag played all 6 matches

Järphag has also been a handball trainer at IK Sanna/Heim and IK Sävehof.
