= Mahmoud Bouanik =

Algerian handball player (born 1967)

Personal information
- Nationality: Algerian
- Born: 1 January 1967 (age 58)

Sport
- Sport: Handball

Mahmoud Bouanik (born 1 January 1967) is an Algerian handball player. He competed at the 1988 Summer Olympics and the 1996 Summer Olympics.
