= Zineddine Mohamed Seghir =

Algerian handball player (born 1959)

Personal information
- Nationality: Algerian
- Born: 22 August 1959 (age 66)

Sport
- Sport: Handball

Achievements and titles
- Olympic finals: 1984 Summer Olympics, 1988 Summer Olympics

Zineddine Mohamed Seghir (born 22 August 1959) is an Algerian handball player. He competed at the 1984 Summer Olympics and the 1988 Summer Olympics.
