= Libor Sovadina =

Czech handball player

Libor Sovadina (born 2 November 1964 in Náchod) is a Czech former handball player who competed in the 1988 Summer Olympics.
