= IHF World Men's Field Handball Championship =

World championship of field handball

- Sport: Field handball
- Founded: 1938
- Founder: International Amateur Handball Federation (IAHF)
- First season: 1938
- No. of teams: 6
- Continent: International (IHF)
- Most recent champion: West Germany (3rd title)
- Most titles: West Germany (3 titles)

IHF World Men's Field Handball Championship was the world championship of field handball and was organized by the International Handball Federation (IHF) in the period 1948–1966. The first edition was organized by the International Amateur Handball Federation (IAHF) the predecessor of the IHF. In total, seven editions were held. West Germany and East Germany did not participate in the 1948 championship due to the end of World War II.

== Tournament ==
Year	Host country	Gold medal game			Bronze medal game
Year	Host country	Gold	Score	Silver	Bronze	Score	Fourth place
1938; Details	Germany	Germany	23–0	Switzerland	Hungary	10–2	Sweden
1948; Details	France	Sweden	11–4	Denmark	Switzerland	21–4	France
1952; Details	Switzerland	West Germany	19–8	Sweden	Switzerland	12–10	Austria
1955; Details	West Germany	West Germany	25–13	Switzerland	Czechoslovakia	13–10	Sweden
1959; Details	Austria	Germany^{1}	14–11	Romania	Sweden	18–9	Austria
1963; Details	Switzerland	East Germany	14–7	West Germany	Switzerland	10–6	Poland
1966; Details	Austria	West Germany	Round-robin (15–15)	East Germany	Austria	Round-robin (19–15)	Poland

^{1}: Germany sent a united team composed of players from the GDR and the FRG.

=== Medal table ===
Rank	Nation	Gold	Silver	Bronze	Total
1	West Germany	3	1	0	4
2	Germany	2	0	0	2
3	Sweden	1	1	1	3
4	East Germany	1	1	0	2
5	Switzerland	0	2	3	5
6	Denmark	0	1	0	1
6	Romania	0	1	0	1
8	Austria	0	0	1	1
8	Czechoslovakia	0	0	1	1
8	Hungary	0	0	1	1
Totals (10 entries)		7	7	7	21

=== National team appearances in the IHF World Championship ===
Best result of participants from Europe, with Israel

Best result for discontinued states

USA

Best result for discontinued states (Germany)

==== Comprehensive team results by tournament ====
Source: IHF official site.

Legend

- 1st – Champions
- 2nd – Runners-up
- 3rd – Third place
- 4th – Fourth place
- 5-10th – Fifth to tenth place
- IR – Intermediary round
- PR – Preliminary round
- •• — Qualified but withdrew
- • — Did not qualify
- × — Did not enter
- — Hosts
- flag — Part of corresponding country.

For each tournament, the number of teams in each finals tournament (in brackets) are shown.

Team	(Germany); 1938 (10)	(France); 1948 (12)	(Switzerland); 1952 (10)	(West Germany); 1955 (17)	(Austria); 1959 (7)	(Switzerland); 1963 (8)	(Austria); 1966 (6)	Total
Austria	(Germany)	IR	4th	7th	4th	5th	3rd	6
Belgium	×	PR	•	PR	•	×	×	2
Czechoslovakia	6th	×	×	3rd	×	×	×	2
Denmark	8th	2nd	5th	PR	6th	×	×	5
Finland	×	PR	×	PR	×	×	×	2
France	×	4th	PR	8th	•	×	×	3
/ (West) Germany	1st	×	1st	1st	1st	2nd	1st	6
East Germany	(Germany)	×	×	×	(Germany)	1st	2nd	2
Hungary	3rd	PR	×	PR	7th	×	×	4
Israel	×	×	×	×	×	7th	×	1
Luxembourg	10th	PR	•	PR	×	×	×	3
Netherlands	9th	IR	6th	PR	×	6th	6th	5
Norway	×	×	•	PR	×	×	×	1
Poland	7th	IR	×	×	•	4th	4th	4
Portugal	×	IR	•	PR	×	×	×	2
Romania	5th	×	×	×	2nd	×	×	2
Saar	(Germany)	(France)	PR	6th	(Germany)	(West Germany)		2
Spain	×	×	PR	PR	••	×	×	2
Sweden	4th	1st	2nd	4th	3rd	×	×	5
Switzerland	2nd	3rd	3rd	2nd	5th	3rd	5th	7
United States	×	×	×	×	×	8th	×	1
Yugoslavia	×	×	•	5th	•	×	×	1

== See also ==
- IHF World Women's Field Handball Championship
- IHF World Men's Handball Championship
