= Miroslav Bajgar =

Czech handball player

Miroslav Bajgar (born 3 February 1958 in Bílovec) is a Czech former handball player who competed in the 1988 Summer Olympics.
