= Ricardo Marín (handballer) =

Spanish handball player (born 1968)

Personal information
- Nationality: Spanish
- Born: 28 April 1968 (age 58) Valencia, Spain

Sport
- Sport: Handball

Ricardo Marín (born 28 April 1968) is a Spanish handball player. He competed at the 1988 Summer Olympics and the 1992 Summer Olympics.
