= Handball at the Goodwill Games =

- Sport: Handball
- First season: 1986
- Folded: 1994
- Most titles: Soviet Union (3 titles)

Handball has been included at three editions of the Goodwill Games. It was first held for both men and women in 1986.

Two other editions have been held in 1990 and 1994, but only for men.

== Men's tournament ==
Year	Host	Final			3rd place match			Teams
Year	Host	Champions	Score	Runners-up	3rd place	Score	4th place	Teams
1986	Soviet Union	Soviet Union	^{n/a}	United States	Czechoslovakia	^{n/a}	Iceland	5 (+1)
1990	United States	Soviet Union	29 – 27 (a.e.t.)	Yugoslavia	Spain	24 – 19	United States	8
1994	Russia	France	22 – 20	Russia	Spain	29 – 25	South Korea	6

^n/a A round-robin tournament determined the final standings.

== Women's tournament ==
Year	Host	Final			3rd place match			Teams
Year	Host	Champions	Score	Runners-up	3rd place	Score	4th place	Teams
1986	Soviet Union	Soviet Union	^{n/a}	West Germany	Hungary	^{n/a}	Denmark	6

^n/a A round-robin tournament determined the final standings.

== Medal table ==
Rank	Nation	Gold	Silver	Bronze	Total
1	Soviet Union	3	0	0	3
2	France	1	0	0	1
3	Russia	0	1	0	1
3	United States	0	1	0	1
3	West Germany	0	1	0	1
3	Yugoslavia	0	1	0	1
7	Spain	0	0	2	2
8	Czechoslovakia	0	0	1	1
8	Hungary	0	0	1	1
Totals (9 entries)		4	4	4	12
