= East Germany men's national handball team =

East Germany

Information
- Association: East German Handball Association

Colours
1st	2nd

Results

Summer Olympics
- Best result: 1 (1980)

World Championship
- Best result: 2 (1970, 1974)
- Last updated on .

The East Germany men's national handball team represented the former country of East Germany in international team handball competitions. They had eight appearances at the World Men's Handball Championships, where they won silver medals in 1970 and 1974, and bronze medals in 1978 and 1986. East Germany won Olympic gold in 1980 after a thrilling final against the USSR. The 1958 World Men's Handball Championship was the third team handball World Championship. It was held in the German Democratic Republic between 27 February and 8 March 1958.The 1974 World Men's Handball Championship was the eighth team handball World Championship. It was held in East Germany between 26 February-10 March 1974. On 30 July 1980, the team won the olympic tournament by defeating the Soviet Union, 23–22, in the final game in Moscow.

== World Championship history ==
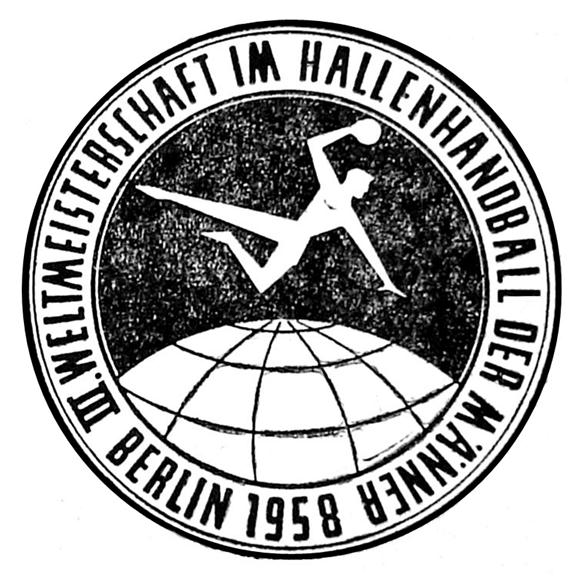

- 1958 : 3rd place
- 1961 : 4th place
- 1964 : 10th place
- 1967 : 9th place
- 1970 : 2nd place
- 1974 : 2nd place
- 1978 : 3rd place
- 1982 : 6th place
- 1986 : 3rd place
- 1990 : 8th place

=== World Outdoor Championship ===
- 1963 (Switzerland) : Champions
- 1966 (Austria) : 2nd place

=== Euro Tournaments ===
All teams in these tournaments are European, All World and Olympic Champions, and top 7 from World Championships and Olympics were participating. They were mini European championships at the time.

EURO World Cup tournament Sweden

- 1971 (Sweden) : 6th place
- 1974 (Sweden) : 3rd place
- 1979 (Sweden) : 3rd place
- 1984 (Sweden) : 6th place
- 1988 (Sweden) : 2nd place

EURO Super Cup tournament Germany

- 1983 (Germany) : 7th place
- 1985 (Germany) : 2nd place
- 1987 (Germany) : 3rd place
- 1989 (Germany) : 2nd place

== Olympic Games ==
- 1972: 4th place
- 1980: Gold
- 1988: 7th place
