= 1986 Goodwill Games =

International sports event

- Official logo
- Host city: Moscow, Russian SFSR
- Country: Soviet Union
- Opening: 5 July 1986
- Closing: 20 July 1986

The Goodwill Games inaugural opening ceremony at the Central Lenin Stadium

The 1986 Goodwill Games was the inaugural edition of the international multi-sport event created by Ted Turner, which was held from 5 – 20 July 1986. The main stadium was the Central Lenin Stadium in Moscow, Russian SFSR, Soviet Union. The Games were a response to the Olympic boycotts of the period, which saw the United States refuse to attend the 1980 Olympic Games in Moscow, and the Soviet Union refusing to attend the 1984 Summer Olympics in Los Angeles. Soviet athletes dominated the competition, winning 118 gold medals and 241 medals overall. The United States finished in second place, with 42 golds and 142 medals in total.

== Summary ==
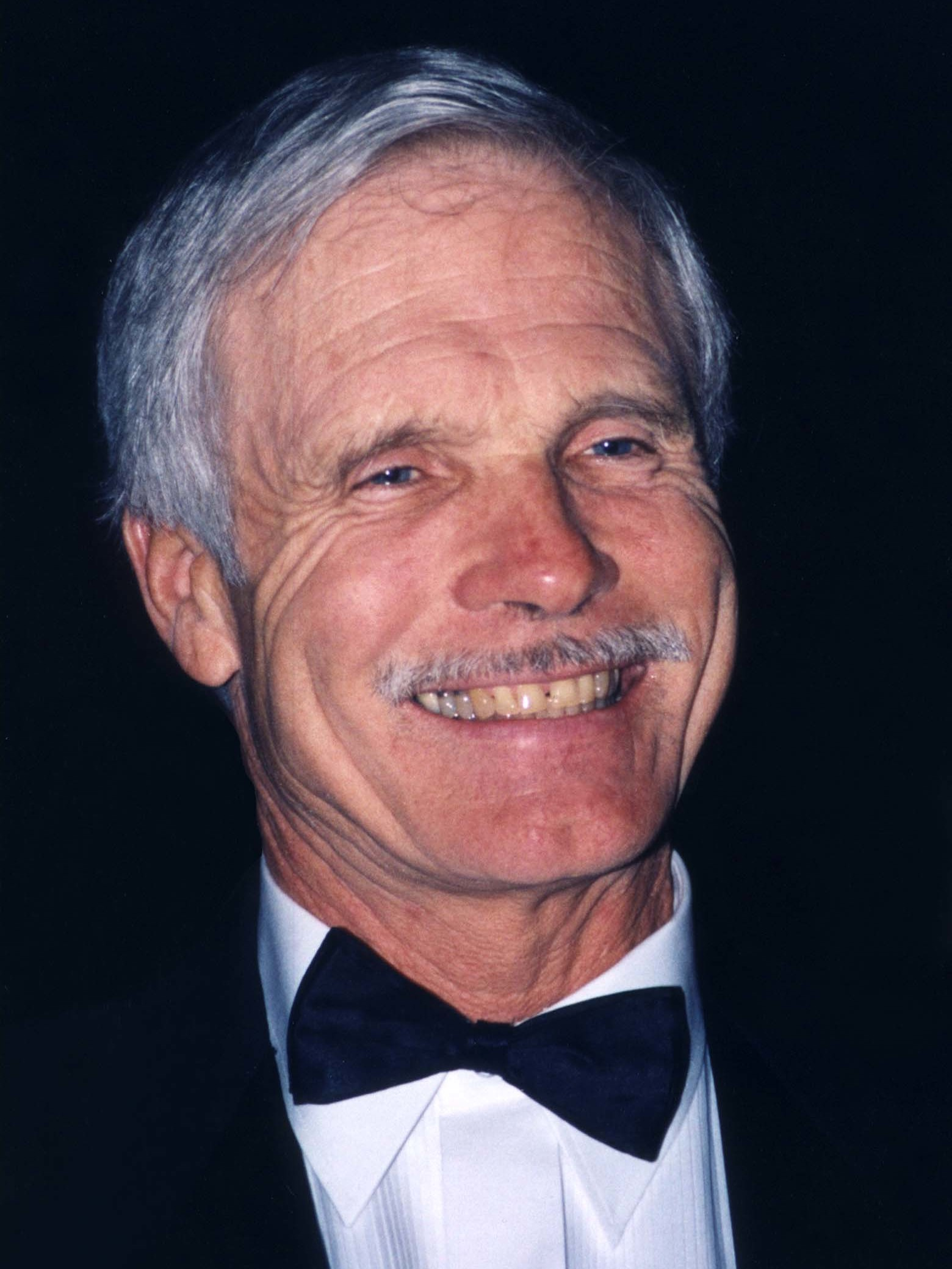
Ted Turner of Turner Broadcasting created and funded the inaugural Goodwill Games

A total of 3000 athletes from 79 nations took part in events in eighteen different sports. The Goodwill Games was the first time in ten years that elite athletes from Soviet Union and United States competed against each other in a major summer multi-sport event. In contrast to the selection methods of other major competitions, the Games was an invitation-only event. The event was broadcast over 129 hours on TBS in the United States.

The Goodwill Games, although commercial in nature, were not successful financially and Turner Broadcasting suffered millions of dollars of losses through its support of the event.

A number of sporting world records were set over the course of the Games. In the athletics competition, Sergey Bubka broke the pole vault record with a mark of 6.01 m, Jackie Joyner-Kersee broke the heptathlon record with a score of 7148 points, while Ben Johnson defeated Carl Lewis in the 100 metres to win his first major international title. Vladimir Salnikov broke the 800 m freestyle world record in the swimming competition with a time of 7:50.64. In the cycling events, Michael Hübner and Erika Salumäe set world records in the men's and women's 200 m flying start race, respectively.

The 1986 FIBA World Basketball Championship in Madrid was broadcast on Ted Turner's network and were thus classified as the official Goodwill Games event for the men's sport. In the women's basketball competition, the United States team broke the Soviets' undefeated international run, which had grown to 152 victories. The 1986 Games also saw the first ever international motorcycle polo, or motoball, competition.

== Sports ==
- Athletics
- Basketball
- Boxing
- Cycling
- Diving
- Gymnastics
- Handball
- Judo
- Modern pentathlon
- Motoball
- Rowing
- Swimming
- Tennis
- Volleyball
- Water polo
- Weightlifting
- Wrestling
- Yachting

== Participant countries ==
- Algeria
- Angola
- Argentina
- Australia
- Austria
- Bahamas
- Bangladesh
- Belgium
- Benin
- Bolivia
- Botswana
- Brazil
- Bulgaria
- Burkina Faso
- Cambodia
- Canada
- China
- Colombia
- Costa Rica
- Ivory Coast
- Cyprus
- Czechoslovakia
- Denmark
- East Germany
- Ecuador
- Ethiopia
- Finland
- France
- Great Britain
- Greece
- Hungary
- India
- Indonesia
- Iceland
- Ireland
- Italy
- Jamaica
- Japan
- Kenya
- Kuwait
- Laos
- Lebanon
- Madagascar
- Mexico
- Mongolia
- Morocco
- Mozambique
- Netherlands
- New Zealand
- Nicaragua
- Nigeria
- North Korea
- North Yemen
- Norway
- Peru
- Poland
- Portugal
- Romania
- Senegal
- Seychelles
- South Yemen
- Soviet Union
- Spain
- Sri Lanka
- Sudan
- Sweden
- Switzerland
- Syria
- Tanzania
- Tunisia
- Turkey
- United States
- Uruguay
- Venezuela
- Vietnam
- West Germany
- Yugoslavia
- Zimbabwe

== Medal table ==
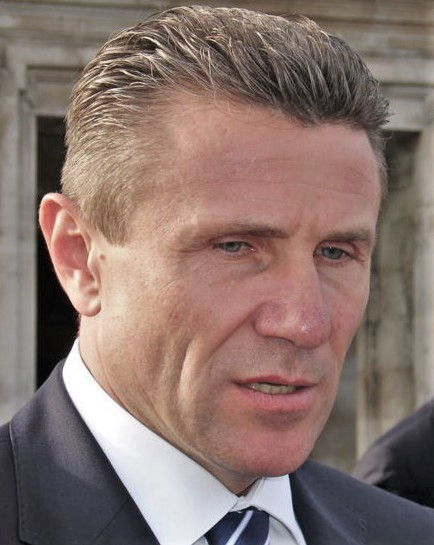
Sergey Bubka won gold for the Soviet Union with a pole vault world record

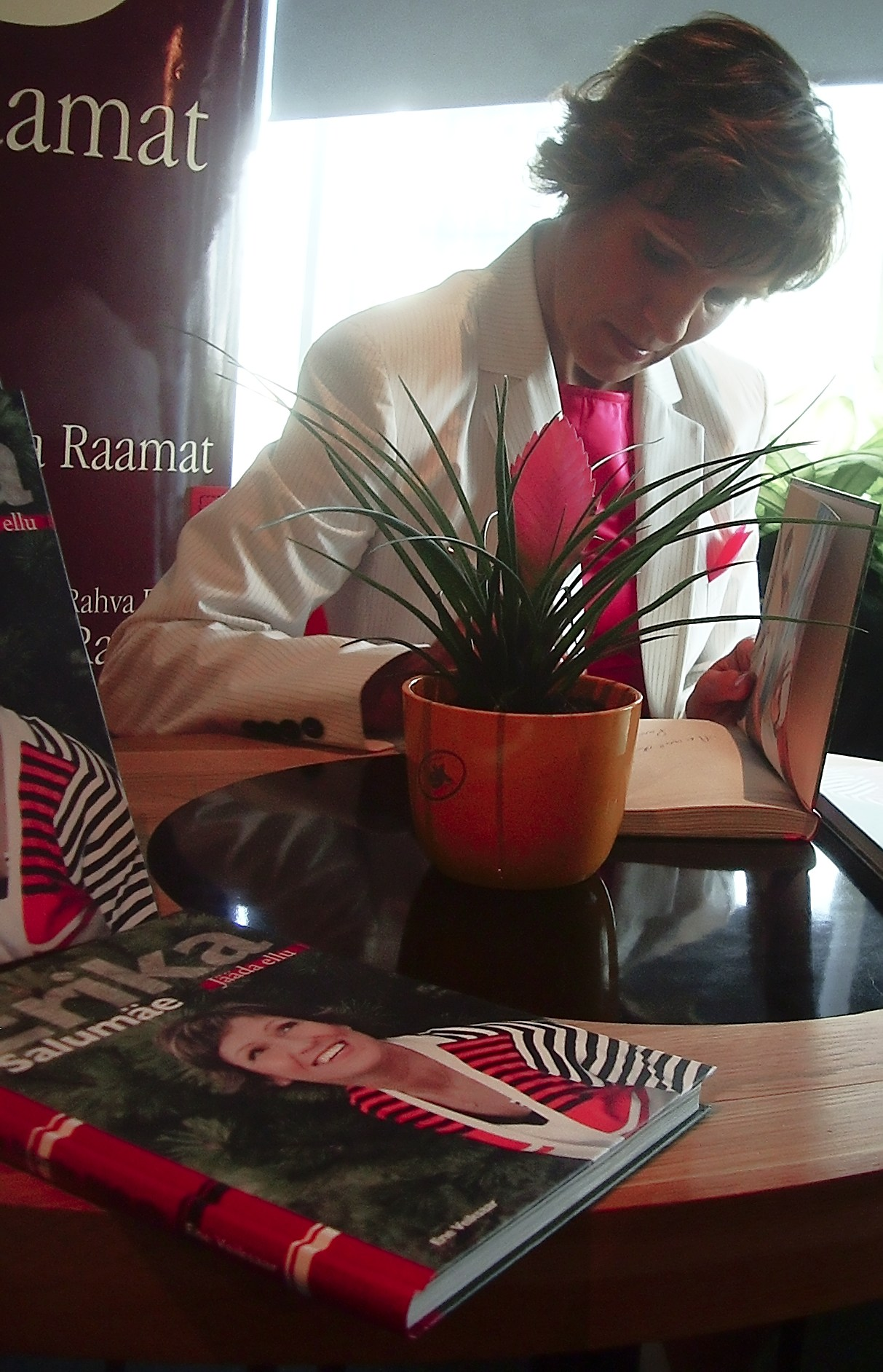
Erika Salumäe was another Soviet athlete to win with a world record

Rank	Nation	Gold	Silver	Bronze	Total
1	Soviet Union (URS)	118	80	43	241
2	United States (USA)	42	49	51	142
3	East Germany (GDR)	7	11	10	28
4	Romania (ROU)	6	6	6	18
5	Bulgaria (BUL)	4	7	20	31
6	Poland (POL)	2	3	6	11
7	Canada (CAN)	2	0	2	4
8	Japan (JPN)	1	0	3	4
9	Australia (AUS)	1	0	2	3
10	Great Britain (GBR)	1	0	1	2
10	Portugal (POR)	1	0	1	2
12	Ethiopia (ETH)	1	0	0	1
12	Switzerland (SUI)	1	0	0	1
14	Czechoslovakia (TCH)	0	9	1	10
15	China (CHN)	0	4	5	9
16	France (FRA)	0	2	2	4
17	Hungary (HUN)	0	1	5	6
17	Mongolia (MGL)	0	1	5	6
19	Venezuela (VEN)	0	1	2	3
20	Turkey (TUR)	0	1	1	2
20	West Germany (FRG)	0	1	1	2
22	Finland (FIN)	0	1	0	1
22	Nigeria (NGR)	0	1	0	1
24	North Korea (PRK)	0	0	6	6
25	Italy (ITA)	0	0	5	5
26	Brazil (BRA)	0	0	2	2
27	Colombia (COL)	0	0	1	1
27	Ivory Coast (CIV)	0	0	1	1
27	Kenya (KEN)	0	0	1	1
27	Kuwait (KUW)	0	0	1	1
27	Netherlands (NED)	0	0	1	1
27	Norway (NOR)	0	0	1	1
Totals (32 entries)		187	178	186	551
