= Equestrian at the 1988 Summer Olympics – Individual jumping =

Equestrian at the Olympics

Individual jumping at the Games of the XXIV Olympiad
- Venue: Seoul Olympic Stadium
- Date: 26 September–2 October
- Competitors: 74 from 24 nations
- Winning total: 1.25 faults

Medalists
1st place, gold medalist(s)		Pierre Durand Jr. France
2nd place, silver medalist(s)		Greg Best; United States
3rd place, bronze medalist(s)		Karsten Huck; West Germany

The individual show jumping at the 1988 Summer Olympics took place between 26 September and 2 October at the Seoul Olympic Stadium. It featured a significant change to the competition format from prior years. The event was open to men and women. There were 74 competitors from 24 nations. Each nation could have up to 4 riders, up from 3 in previous years (though only a maximum of 3 could advance to the final). The event was won by Pierre Durand Jr. of France, the nation's first victory in individual jumping since 1964 and fourth overall—most of any nation, moving out of a tie with Italy at three. Silver went to Greg Best of the United States, with bronze to Karsten Huck of West Germany.

== Background ==
This was the 18th appearance of the event, which had first been held at the 1900 Summer Olympics and has been held at every Summer Olympics at which equestrian sports have been featured (that is, excluding 1896, 1904, and 1908). It is the oldest event on the current programme, the only one that was held in 1900. The team and individual events remained separated, as they had been starting in 1968.

Five of the top 10 riders from the 1984 Games returned: gold medalist Joseph Fargis of the United States, fourth-place finisher Mario Deslauriers of Canada, sixth-place finisher Luis Álvarez de Cervera of Spain, seventh-place finisher Frédéric Cottier of France, and tenth-place finisher Luis Astolfi of Spain. The field was considered open, with top riders (including 1986 World Champion Gail Greenough of Canada and 1987 World Cup winner Katharine Burdsall of the United States) not competing.

Colombia and Liechtenstein each made their debut in the event. France competed for the 16th time, most of any nation.

== Competition format ==
The competition underwent a significant format change, adding a two-round qualifying round before the two-round final. The course was 770 metres long, with jumps up to 1.60 metres high, a 2.00 metre oxer, and a 4.60 metre water jump.

In the qualifying round, each pair performed in two rounds. There was no elimination between the two rounds of the qualifying. Positive scoring, rather than the fault system, was used for the qualifying round. The total score for the two rounds in qualifying was used to determined advancement to the final. A maximum of 50% of the pairs could advance (37 of the 74 starters), with each nation limited to three riders advancing.

The final also consisted of two rounds. This time, however, there was a cut between the two rounds; only the top 20 advanced from the first round of the final to the second. Both rounds of the final used the typical fault system of scoring. The combined score for both rounds determined the placement. A jump-off would be used if necessary to break ties for medal positions; other ties would not be broken.

== Schedule ==
All times are Korea Standard Time adjusted for daylight savings (UTC+10)

Date	Time	Round
Monday, 26 September 1988	10:00	Qualifying round 1 Qualifying round 2
Sunday, 2 October 1988	8:00	Final round 1 Final round 2

== Results ==
Bourdy (France), Brinkmann (West Germany), and Pyrah (Great Britain) did not advance due to the limit of three pairs per nation. Bourdy was tied for 8th in the qualifying round; Cottier and Durand had lower scores than him but advanced instead. Durand, 18th overall and 4th among French riders in qualifying, ran both rounds of the final without any jumping penalties and finished with a total of 1.25 faults from time to win the gold medal. Huck had led the first round of the final, with a completely clean run (0 faults) to Durand's 0.25 time faults, and went last in the second round of the final knowing that Durand had reached the 1.25 total. Huck nearly made the second round clean as well, but hit the next-to-last rail to receive 4 faults—tied with Best for second, who had had 4 in the first round but was clean in the second. In the jump-off, both Huck and Best had 4 faults again; the silver medal went to the American based on time in the jump-off.

Rank	Rider	Horse	Nation	Qualifying			Final			Jump-off	
Rank	Rider	Horse	Nation	Round 1	Round 2	Total	Round 1	Round 2	Total	Faults	Time
1st place, gold medalist(s)	Pierre Durand Jr.	Jappeloup	France	59.50	50.50	110.00	0.25	1.00	1.25	—N/a	
2nd place, silver medalist(s)	Greg Best	Gem Twist	United States	69.50	63.50	133.00	4.00	0.00	4.00	4.00	45.70
3rd place, bronze medalist(s)	Karsten Huck	Nepornuk 8	West Germany	48.00	70.00	118.00	0.00	4.00	4.00	4.00	54.75
4	Anne Kursinski	Starman	United States	69.50	52.00	121.50	4.00	4.00	8.00	—N/a	
4	David Broome	Countryman	Great Britain	48.00	41.00	89.00	4.00	4.00	8.00	—N/a	
6	Jaime Azcárraga	Chin Chin	Mexico	58.00	60.00	118.00	4.00	4.25	8.25	—N/a	
7	Jan Tops	Doreen	Netherlands	55.00	45.00	100.00	8.00	4.00	12.00	—N/a	
7	Nick Skelton	Apollo	Great Britain	41.50	56.00	97.50	4.00	8.00	12.00	—N/a	
7	Joe Fargis	Mill Pearl	United States	69.50	63.50	133.00	4.00	8.00	12.00	—N/a	
7	Franke Sloothaak	Walzerkonig 19	West Germany	48.00	56.00	104.00	4.00	8.00	12.00	—N/a	
7	Markus Fuchs	Shandor II	Switzerland	22.50	45.00	67.50	4.00	8.00	12.00	—N/a	
7	Thomas Fuchs	Dollar Girl	Switzerland	63.50	70.00	133.50	4.00	8.00	12.00	—N/a	
7	Jos Lansink	Felix	Netherlands	43.50	72.00	115.50	4.00	8.00	12.00	—N/a	
14	Joe Túri	Vital	Great Britain	34.50	63.50	98.00	4.25	8.00	12.25	—N/a	
15	Ian Millar	Big Ben	Canada	69.50	56.00	125.50	0.75	12.25	13.00	—N/a	
16	Rob Ehrens	Sunrise	Netherlands	69.50	56.00	125.50	8.00	8.00	16.00	—N/a	
16	Michel Robert	La Fayette	France	63.50	73.50	137.00	4.00	12.00	16.00	—N/a	
18	Juan García	Tirol	Spain	61.50	29.00	90.50	8.00	8.25	16.25	—N/a	
19	Dirk Hafemeister	Orchidee 76	West Germany	69.50	70.00	139.50	4.00	14.00	18.00	—N/a	
20	Jack Doyle	Hardly	Ireland	30.50	50.50	81.00	8.00	24.75	32.75	—N/a	
21	Lisa Carlsen	Kahlua	Canada	69.50	73.50	143.00	4.00	EL	EL	—N/a	
22	Gerry Mullins	Glendalough	Ireland	55.00	27.00	82.00	8.50	did not advance		—N/a	
22	Pedro Sánchez	Nuit Des Tourelle	Spain	59.50	29.00	88.50	8.50	did not advance		—N/a	
24	Vitor Teixeira	Going	Brazil	46.00	67.50	113.50	8.75	did not advance		—N/a	
25	André Johannpeter	Heartbreaker	Brazil	29.00	39.00	68.00	9.50	did not advance		—N/a	
26	Jean-Claude Van Geenberghe	Piquet	Belgium	69.50	63.50	133.00	12.00	did not advance		—N/a	
26	Mark Todd	Bago	New Zealand	55.00	33.00	88.00	12.00	did not advance		—N/a	
28	George Sanna	Schnaps	Australia	37.00	49.00	86.00	13.25	did not advance		—N/a	
29	Rodney Brown	Slinky	Australia	55.00	40.00	95.00	13.50	did not advance		—N/a	
30	Mario Deslauriers	Box Car Willie	Canada	61.50	56.00	117.50	15.75	did not advance		—N/a	
31	Frédéric Cottier	Flambeauc	France	50.00	61.00	111.00	16.00	did not advance		—N/a	
32	Philippe Guerdat	Lanciano II	Switzerland	25.50	48.00	73.50	23.75	did not advance		—N/a	
33	Manuel da Costa	Jalisco B	Portugal	69.50	25.00	94.50	24.00	did not advance		—N/a	
33	Luis Álvarez de Cervera	Mirage Mexicain	Spain	40.00	33.00	73.00	24.00	did not advance		—N/a	
35	Boris Boor	Monaco F	Austria	41.50	45.00	86.50	24.75	did not advance		—N/a	
36	Manuel Torres	Zalme	Colombia	32.00	35.50	67.50	35.75	did not advance		—N/a	
37	Hugo Simon	Gipsy Lady	Austria	34.50	66.00	100.50	DNF	did not advance		—N/a	
38	Hubert Bourdy	Morgat	France	69.50	56.00	125.50	did not advance			—N/a	
39	Wolfgang Brinkmann	Pedro	West Germany	39.00	67.50	106.50	did not advance			—N/a	
40	Malcolm Pyrah	Anglezarke	Great Britain	52.00	26.00	78.00	did not advance			—N/a	
41	Wout-Jan van der Schans	Treffer	Netherlands	51.00	15.00	66.00	did not advance			—N/a	
42	Yoshihiro Nakano	El Lute	Japan	34.50	29.00	63.50	did not advance			—N/a	
43	Luis Astolfi	Coreven Steepers	Spain	17.00	45.00	62.00	did not advance			—N/a	
44	Thomas Batliner	Foxstone	Liechtenstein	45.00	17.00	62.00	did not advance			—N/a	
45	Kim Seung-hwan	Forever	South Korea	30.50	31.00	61.50	did not advance			—N/a	
46	Anatoly Timoshenko	Pinguin	Soviet Union	18.00	42.00	60.00	did not advance			—N/a	
46	Ove Hansen	Sancerre	Norway	38.00	22.00	60.00	did not advance			—N/a	
48	Maurice Beatson	Jeferson Junior	New Zealand	43.50	16.00	59.50	did not advance			—N/a	
49	John Anderson	Farmer	Canada	0.00	56.00	56.00	did not advance			—N/a	
50	Juan Carlos García	Buenos Aires	Colombia	12.00	38.00	50.00	did not advance			—N/a	
51	Shuichi Toki	Purplex	Japan	25.50	23.00	48.50	did not advance			—N/a	
52	Ryuzo Okuno	Challenger No. 1	Japan	10.00	37.00	47.00	did not advance			—N/a	
53	Jeff McVean	Whisper Grey	Australia	0.00	45.00	45.00	did not advance			—N/a	
54	Gerardo Tazzer	Peregrine	Mexico	22.50	21.00	43.50	did not advance			—N/a	
55	Harvey Wilson	Crosby	New Zealand	22.50	19.50	42.00	did not advance			—N/a	
56	Lisa Jacquin	For The Moment	United States	16.00	24.00	40.00	did not advance			—N/a	
57	Nam Gwan-U	Opal	South Korea	3.00	35.50	38.50	did not advance			—N/a	
58	André Salah Sakakini	Tric Trac 2	Egypt	0.00	33.00	33.00	did not advance			—N/a	
59	Alberto Carmona	The Dubliner	Venezuela	11.00	18.00	29.00	did not advance			—N/a	
60	Takao Sawai	Milkyway	Japan	8.00	19.50	27.50	did not advance			—N/a	
61	Alejandro Orózco	Eros	Mexico	15.00	0.00	15.00	did not advance			—N/a	
62	Mun Hyeon-jin	Amadeus	South Korea	0.00	14.00	14.00	did not advance			—N/a	
63	Mun Eun-jin	Makmillion	South Korea	9.00	0.00	9.00	did not advance			—N/a	
64	Gregory McDermott	Mr. Shrimpton	Australia	55.00	DNS		did not advance			—N/a	
65	Alberto Rivera	Rey A	Mexico	34.50	DNS		did not advance			—N/a	
66	Paulo Stewart	Platon	Brazil	27.50	DNS		did not advance			—N/a	
67	Walter Gabathuler	Jogger	Switzerland	22.50	DNS		did not advance			—N/a	
68	Paul Darragh	For Sure	Ireland	19.50	DNS		did not advance			—N/a	
68	John Ledingham	Kilcoltrim	Ireland	19.50	DNS		did not advance			—N/a	
70	John Cottle	Ups & Downs	New Zealand	13.50	DNS		did not advance			—N/a	
71	Raimundas Udrakis	Dekoratsia	Soviet Union	7.00	DNS		did not advance			—N/a	
72	Christina Johannpeter	Societe	Brazil	6.00	DNS		did not advance			—N/a	
73	Vyacheslav Chukanov	Zritel	Soviet Union	5.00	DNS		did not advance			—N/a	
74	Sergejs Šakurovs	Final	Soviet Union	4.00	DNS		did not advance			—N/a	
