= Equestrian at the 1988 Summer Olympics – Team jumping =

Team jumping at the Games of the XXIV Olympiad
- Venue: Seoul Olympic Stadium
- Date: 28 September
- Competitors: 64 from 16 nations

Medalists
| 1st place, gold medalist(s) | | Ludger Beerbaum; Wolfgang Brinkmann; Dirk Hafemeister; Franke Sloothaak | West Germany |
| 2nd place, silver medalist(s) | | Greg Best; Lisa Ann Jacquin; Anne Kursinski; Joseph Fargis | United States |
| 3rd place, bronze medalist(s) | | Hubert Bourdy; Frédéric Cottier; Michel Robert; Pierre Durand Jr. | France |

The team jumping at the 1988 Summer Olympics took place on 28 September at the Seoul Olympic Stadium.

== Results ==
| Rank | Name | Nation | Round 1 | Round 2 | Total |
|---|---|---|---|---|---|
| 1st place, gold medalist(s) | Ludger Beerbaum; Wolfgang Brinkmann; Dirk Hafemeister; Franke Sloothaak | West Germany | 4.25 | 13.00 | 17.25 |
| 2nd place, silver medalist(s) | Greg Best; Lisa Ann Jacquin; Anne Kursinski; Joseph Fargis | United States | 12.25 | 8.25 | 20.50 |
| 3rd place, bronze medalist(s) | Hubert Bourdy; Frédéric Cottier; Michel Robert; Pierre Durand Jr. | France | 18.75 | 8.75 | 27.50 |
| 4 | Ian Millar; Mario Deslauriers; Lisa Carlsen; Laura Tidball-Balisky | Canada | 16.00 | 12.75 | 28.75 |
| 5 | Wout-Jan van der Schans; Rob Ehrens; Jan Tops; Jos Lansink | Netherlands | 16.25 | 16.00 | 32.25 |
| 6 | Nick Skelton; Malcolm Pyrah; David Broome; Joe Túri | Great Britain | 16.00 | 24.00 | 40.00 |
| 7 | Markus Fuchs; Thomas Fuchs; Philippe Guerdat; Walter Gabathuler | Switzerland | 16.00 | 28.25 | 44.25 |
| 8 | André Johannpeter; Christina Johannpeter; Vitor Teixeira; Paulo Stewart | Brazil | 40.00 | 35.00 | 75.00 |
| 8 | Alfredo Fernández; Juan García; Pedro Sánchez; Luis Álvarez | Spain | 29.50 | 45.50 | 75.00 |
| 10 | Jeff McVean; Vicki Roycroft; Rodney Brown; George Sanna | Australia | 44.25 | 33.25 | 77.50 |
| 11 | Gerry Mullins; Jack Doyle; Paul Darragh; John Ledingham | Ireland | 33.00 | 48.50 | 81.50 |
| 12 | Mark Todd; Harvey Wilson; Maurice Beatson; Colin McIntosh | New Zealand | 52.25 | 44.75 | 97.00 |
| 13 | Ryuzo Okuno; Yoshihiro Nakano; Shuichi Toki; Takao Sawai | Japan | 63.25 | did not advance | |
| 14 | Gerardo Tazzer; Jaime Azcárraga; Everardo Hegewisch; Alberto Rivera | Mexico | 76.50 | did not advance | |
| 15 | Anatoly Timoshenko; Sergejs Šakurovs; Raimundas Udrakis; Vyacheslav Chukanov | Soviet Union | 80.25 | did not advance | |
| 16 | Kim Seung-hwan; Mun Eun-jin; Mun Hyeon-jin; Nam Gwan-U | South Korea | 142.75 | did not advance | |
