= Mexico at the 1988 Summer Olympics =

- IOC code: MEX
- NOC: Mexican Olympic Committee

in Seoul
- Competitors: 83 (66 men, 17 women) in 17 sports
- Flag bearer: Ernesto Canto
- Medals Ranked 44th: Gold 0 Silver 0 Bronze 2 Total 2

Summer Olympics appearances (overview)
- 1900; 1904–1920; 1924; 1928; 1932; 1936; 1948; 1952; 1956; 1960; 1964; 1968; 1972; 1976; 1980; 1984; 1988; 1992; 1996; 2000; 2004; 2008; 2012; 2016; 2020; 2024

Mexico competed at the 1988 Summer Olympics in Seoul, South Korea. 83 competitors, 66 men and 17 women, took part in 82 events in 17 sports.

== Competitors ==
The following is the list of number of competitors in the Games.

Sport	Men	Women	Total
Archery	3	1	4
Athletics	18	3	21
Boxing	6	–	6
Cycling	5	0	5
Diving	2	1	3
Equestrian	5	0	5
Fencing	0	1	1
Gymnastics	1	0	1
Judo	3	–	3
Modern pentathlon	3	–	3
Rowing	2	0	2
Sailing	2	2	4
Shooting	2	1	3
Swimming	7	3	10
Synchronized swimming	–	3	3
Tennis	3	2	5
Wrestling	4	–	4
Total	66	17	83

== Medalists ==
Medal	Name	Sport	Event	Date
Bronze	Jesús Mena	Diving	Men's 10 metre platforn	27 September
Bronze	Mario González	Boxing	Flyweight	29 September

== Archery ==
In its third Olympic archery competition, Mexico entered three men and one woman.

Men

Athlete	Event	Ranking round		Round 1		Quarterfinals		Semifinals		Final	
Athlete	Event	Score	Rank	Score	Rank	Score	Rank	Score	Rank	Score	Rank
Andrés Anchondo	Individual	1248	26	Did not advance							
Omar Bustani	Individual	1232	38	Did not advance							
Adolfo González	Individual	1215	49	Did not advance							
Andrés Anchondo; Omar Bustani; Adolfo González	Team	3695	10 Q	—N/a				917	12	Did not advance	

Women

Athlete	Event	Ranking round		Round 1		Quarterfinals		Semifinals		Final	
Athlete	Event	Score	Rank	Score	Rank	Score	Rank	Score	Rank	Score	Rank
Aurora Bretón	Individual	1224	29	Did not advance							

== Athletics ==
Men
Track and road events

Athlete	Event	Heat Round 1		Heat Round 2		Semifinal		Final	
Athlete	Event	Time	Rank	Time	Rank	Time	Rank	Time	Rank
Eduardo Nava	100 metres	10.68	54	Did not advance					
Mauricio Hernández	800 metres	1:49.03	38	Did not advance					
Marcos Barreto	5000 metres	13:45.82	14 q	—N/a		13:53.93	27	Did not advance	
Arturo Barrios	5000 metres	13:59.04	32	—N/a		Did not advance			
Mauricio González	5000 metres	13:47.98	20 Q	—N/a		13:32.52	19	Did not advance	
Marcos Barreto	10,000 metres	29:18.14	28	—N/a				Did not advance	
Arturo Barrios	10,000 metres	28:08.63	3 Q	—N/a				27:39.32	5
Mauricio González	10,000 metres	28:36.66	20 Q	—N/a				27:59.90	11
Jesús Herrera	Marathon	—N/a						2:13:58	11
Martín Mondragón	Marathon	—N/a						2:27:10	57
Carlos Rétiz	Marathon	—N/a						2:25:34	50
Roberto Carmona	110 metres hurdles	15.24	39	Did not advance					
Ernesto Canto	20 kilometres walk	—N/a						DQ	
Carlos Mercenario	20 kilometres walk	—N/a						1:20:56	7
Joel Sánchez	20 kilometres walk	—N/a						DQ	
Hernán Andrade	50 kilometres walk	—N/a						DQ	
Martín Bermúdez	50 kilometres walk	—N/a						3:49:22	15
Arturo Bravo	50 kilometres walk	—N/a						4:08:08	33
Herman Adam; Eduardo Nava; Antonio Ruíz; Miguel Elizondo	4 × 100 metres relay	40.31	17	—N/a		Did not advance			

Women
Track and road events

Athlete	Event	Heat Round 1		Heat Round 2		Semifinal		Final	
Athlete	Event	Time	Rank	Time	Rank	Time	Rank	Time	Rank
Blanca Jaime	Marathon	—N/a						2:43:00	43
Sandra Taváres	100 metres hurdles	13.81	26	Did not advance					

Field events

Athlete	Event	Qualification		Final	
Athlete	Event	Distance	Position	Distance	Position
Cristina Fink	High jump	1.84	21	Did not advance	

== Boxing ==
Athlete	Event	Round of 64	Round of 32	Round of 16	Quarterfinals	Semifinals	Final	
Athlete	Event	Opposition Result	Opposition Result	Opposition Result	Opposition Result	Opposition Result	Opposition Result	Rank
Mario González	Flyweight	Bye	Mathibeli (LES); W 5–0	Pingale (IND); W 4–1	Kotey (GHA); W w/o	Tews (GDR); L 0–5	Did not advance	3rd place, bronze medalist(s)
José de Jesús García	Bantamweight	Joseph (GRN); W RSC R1	Mayanja (SWE); L 1–4	Did not advance				
Miguel Ángel González	Featherweight	Lee (KOR); L 0–5	Did not advance					
Guillermo Tamez	Lightweight	Knight (BAR); L 0–5	Did not advance					
Humberto Rodríguez	Light welterweight	Bye	Temo (FIJ); W RSC R2	Chinyadza (ZIM); W KO	Myrberg (SWE); L KO	Did not advance		
Martín Amarillas	Middleweight	Bye	Shah (PAK); L 2–3	Did not advance				

== Cycling ==
Five cyclists, all men, represented Mexico in 1988.

=== Road ===
Men

Athlete	Event	Time	Rank
Gabriel Cano	Road race	DNF	
Héctor Pérez	Road race	4:42:47	94
Luis Rosendo Ramos	Road race	4:32:56	77
Gabriel Cano; Guillermo Gutiérrez; Héctor Pérez; Luis Rosendo Ramos	Team time trial	2:12:46.4	22

=== Track ===
Points race

Athlete	Event	Qualification			Final		
Athlete	Event	Laps	Points	Rank	Laps	Points	Rank
Manuel Youshimatz	Points race	Same lap	32	1 Q	–2 laps	21	9

== Diving ==
Men

Athlete	Event	Qualification		Final	
Athlete	Event	Points	Rank	Points	Rank
Jesús Mena	3 metre springboard	581.01	8 Q	598.77	7
Jorge Mondragón	3 metre springboard	594.36	5 Q	616.02	6
Jesús Mena	10 metre platform	523.50	10 Q	594.39	3rd place, bronze medalist(s)
Jorge Mondragón	10 metre platform	518.52	11 Q	511.89	9

Women

Athlete	Event	Qualification		Final	
Athlete	Event	Points	Rank	Points	Rank
María José Alcalá	3 metre springboard	392.16	20	Did not advance	
María José Alcalá	10 metre platform	359.64	10 Q	349.41	9

== Equestrianism ==
=== Jumping ===
Athlete	Horse	Event	Qualification						Final					
Athlete	Horse	Event	Round 1		Round 2		Total		Round 1		Round 2		Total	
Athlete	Horse	Event	Score	Rank	Score	Rank	Score	Rank	Penalties	Rank	Penalties	Rank	Total	Rank
Jaime Azcárraga	Chin Chin	Individual	58.00	17	60.00	15	118.00	12 Q	4.00	4 Q	4.25	7	8.25	6
Alejandro Orózco	Eros	Individual	15.00	59	0.00	62	15.00	61	Did not advance					
Alberto Rivera	Rey A	Individual	34.50	39	DNS		DNF		Did not advance					
Gerardo Tazzer	Peregrine	Individual	22.50	50	21.00	54	43.50	54	Did not advance					
Jaime Azcárraga; Everardo Hegewisch; Alberto Rivera; Gerardo Tazzer	Chin Chin; Pepito; Rey A Peregrine	Team	—N/a						76.50	14	Did not advance			

== Fencing ==
One female fencer represented Mexico in 1988.

Individual
Pool stages

Athlete	Event	Group Stage 1					Group Stage 2						Group Stage 3					
Athlete	Event	Opposition Result	Opposition Result	Opposition Result	Opposition Result	Rank	Opposition Result	Opposition Result	Opposition Result	Opposition Result	Opposition Result	Rank	Opposition Result	Opposition Result	Opposition Result	Opposition Result	Opposition Result	Rank
Fabiana López	Women's foil	Bau (FRG); L 4–5	Glikina (URS); L 1–5	Palm (SWE); L 4–5	Lazăr (ROU); L 0–5	5	Did not advance											

== Gymnastics ==
=== Artistic ===
Men

Athlete	Event	Qualification							
Athlete	Event	Apparatus						Total	Rank
Athlete	Event	F	PH	R	V	PB	HB	Total	Rank
Tony Piñeda	Individual	18.250	17.050	18.000	18.300	19.300	11.500	102.400	88

== Judo ==
Athlete	Event	Round of 64	Round of 32	Round of 16	Quarterfinals	Semifinals	Repechage			Final	
Athlete	Event	Round of 64	Round of 32	Round of 16	Quarterfinals	Semifinals	Round 1	Round 2	Round 3	Final	
Athlete	Event	Opposition Result	Opposition Result	Opposition Result	Opposition Result	Opposition Result	Opposition Result	Opposition Result	Opposition Result	Opposition Result	Rank
Salvador Hernández	60 kg	Bye		Hosokawa (JPN); L Ippon	Did not advance						
Federico Vizcarra	71 kg	Bye	Ruiz (PUR); W Shido	Brain (AUS); L Yuko	Did not advance						
Carlos Huttich	78 kg	Bye	Erkhembayar (MGL); L Waza-ari	Did not advance							

== Modern pentathlon ==
Three male pentathletes represented Mexico in 1988.

Athlete	Event	Riding (show jumping)			Fencing (épée one touch)			Swimming (300 m freestyle)			Shooting (Rapid fire pistol)			Running (4000 m)			Total points	Final rank
Athlete	Event	Penalties	Rank	MP points	Results	Rank	MP points	Time	Rank	MP points	Points	Rank	MP Points	Time	Rank	MP Points	Total points	Final rank
Marcelo Hoyo	Individual	174	37	926	31	30	762	3:36.97	48	1140	184	56	780	13:11.76	12	1192	4800	39
Ivar Sisniega	Individual	150	30	950	31	36	752	3:21.51	16	1260	189	34	890	13:04.47	8	1213	5065	14
Alejandro Yrizar	Individual	246	47	854	36	17	847	3:23.47	24	1248	189	34	890	13:48.31	26	1081	4920	28
Marcelo Hoyo; Ivar Sisniega; Alejandro Yrizar	Team	570	10	2730	98	9	2361	10:21.95	10	3648	562	16	2560	40:04.54	2	3486	14785	8

== Rowing ==
Men

Athlete	Event	Heats		Repechage		Semifinals		Final	
Athlete	Event	Time	Rank	Time	Rank	Time	Rank	Time	Rank
Luis Miguel García; Joaquín Gómez	Double sculls	6:45.16	5 R	6:45.59	4	Did not advance			

== Sailing ==
Women

Athlete	Event	Race							Net points	Final rank
Athlete	Event	1	2	3	4	5	6	7	Net points	Final rank
Eliane Fierro; Tania Fierro	470	24	23	23	25	20	22	~~28~~	137	19

Open

Athlete	Event	Race							Net points	Final rank
Athlete	Event	1	2	3	4	5	6	7	Net points	Final rank
Nilo Ozib	Division II	46	44	41	~~52~~	52	35	34	252	38
Eric Mergenthaler	Finn	10	14	17	24	15	28	~~40~~	108	13

== Shooting ==
Men

Athlete	Event	Qualification		Final	
Athlete	Event	Points	Rank	Points	Rank
José Álvarez	50 m rifle three positions	1154	40	Did not advance	
José Álvarez	50 m rifle prone	591	39	Did not advance	

Mixed

Athlete	Event	Qualification		Final	
Athlete	Event	Points	Rank	Points	Rank
Nuria Ortiz	Skeet	141	40	Did not advance	
Alfredo Cuentas	Trap	138	39	Did not advance	

== Swimming ==
Men

Athlete	Event	Heats		Final A/B	
Athlete	Event	Time	Rank	Time	Rank
Javier Careaga	100 metre breaststroke	1:05.37	35	Did not advance	
Javier Careaga	200 metre breaststroke	2:20.11	23	Did not advance	
Javier Careaga	200 metre individual medley	2:09.38	24	Did not advance	
Javier Careaga	400 metre individual medley	4:30.71	21	Did not advance	
Ignacio Escamilla	100 metre freestyle	54.56	56	Did not advance	
Ignacio Escamilla	200 metre freestyle	1:53.63	32	Did not advance	
Ignacio Escamilla	400 metre freestyle	4:03.16	34	Did not advance	
Rodrigo González	50 metre freestyle	24.01	29	Did not advance	
Rodrigo González	100 metre freestyle	51.46	28	Did not advance	
Rodrigo González	200 metre freestyle	1:52.99	26	Did not advance	
Rodrigo González	200 metre individual medley	2:09.52	25	Did not advance	
Carlos Romo	400 metre freestyle	4:04.02	35	Did not advance	
Carlos Romo	100 metre butterfly	58.04	41	Did not advance	
Ernesto Vela	100 metre backstroke	59.19	33	Did not advance	
Ernesto Vela	200 metre backstroke	2:05.08	22	Did not advance	
Urbano Zea	50 metre freestyle	24.86	45	Did not advance	
Urbano Zea	100 metre butterfly	57.89	40	Did not advance	
Rodrigo González; Ignacio Escamilla; Jorge Alarcón; Urbano Zea	4 × 100 metre freestyle relay	3:29.72	13	Did not advance	
Ignacio Escamilla; Jorge Alarcón; Carlos Romo; Rodrigo González	4 × 200 metre freestyle relay	DQ		Did not advance	
Ernesto Vela; Javier Careaga; Urbano Zea; Rodrigo González	4 × 100 metre medley relay	3:54.21	20	Did not advance	

Women

Athlete	Event	Heats		Final A/B	
Athlete	Event	Time	Rank	Time	Rank
Marlene Bruten	100 metre butterfly	1:05.37	29	Did not advance	
Marlene Bruten	200 metre butterfly	2:19.68	23	Did not advance	
Marlene Bruten	200 metre individual medley	2:26.89	27	Did not advance	
Marlene Bruten	400 metre individual medley	5:03.69	26	Did not advance	
Patricia Kohlmann	50 metre freestyle	27.45	32	Did not advance	
Patricia Kohlmann	100 metre freestyle	59.05	36	Did not advance	
Patricia Kohlmann	200 metre freestyle	2:10.36	35	Did not advance	
Patricia Kohlmann	200 metre individual medley	2:29.61	29	Did not advance	
María Rivera	50 metre freestyle	27.16	26	Did not advance	
María Rivera	100 metre freestyle	59.32	38	Did not advance	

== Synchronized swimming ==
Three synchronized swimmers represented Mexico in 1988.

Athlete	Event	Figures		Qualification			Final		
Athlete	Event	Points	Rank	Points	Total (Figures + Qualification)	Rank	Points	Total (Figures + Final)	Rank
Lourdes Candini	Solo	84.533	23 Q	88.000	172.533	10	Did not advance		
Susana Candini	Solo	83.067	29	Did not advance					
Sonia Cárdeñas	Solo	84.733	21	Did not advance					
Lourdes Candini; Susana Candini (qualification); Sonia Cárdeñas (final)	Duet	83.800	8	91.200	175.000	8 Q	92.200	176.833	8

== Tennis ==
Men

Athlete	Event	Round of 64	Round of 32	Round of 16	Quarterfinals	Semifinals	Final	
Athlete	Event	Opposition Result	Opposition Result	Opposition Result	Opposition Result	Opposition Result	Opposition Result	Rank
Leonardo Lavalle	Singles	Agénor (HAI); W 3–6, 6–3, 6–2, 2–1 Retired	Casal (ESP); L 3–6, 4–6, 6–7	Did not advance				
Francisco Maciel	Singles	Nargiso (ITA); L 6–4, 6–2, 6–7, 6–7, 6–8	Did not advance					
Agustín Moreno	Singles	Tsuchihashi (JPN); W 7–6, 6–2, 6–4	Edberg (SWE); L 2–6, 6–7, 0–6	Did not advance				
Leonardo Lavalle; Agustín Moreno	Doubles	—N/a	Markovits / Köves (HUN); L 6–3, 3–6, 7–6, 4–6, 4–6	Did not advance				

Women

Athlete	Event	Round of 64	Round of 32	Round of 16	Quarterfinals	Semifinals	Final	
Athlete	Event	Opposition Result	Opposition Result	Opposition Result	Opposition Result	Opposition Result	Opposition Result	Rank
Xóchitl Escobedo	Singles	Minter (AUS); L 1–6, 3–6	Did not advance					
Claudia Hernández	Singles	Bye	Garrison (USA); L 1–6, 4–6					
Xóchitl Escobedo; Claudia Hernández	Doubles	—N/a		Savčenko / Zvereva (URS); L 1–6, 2–6	Did not advance			

== Wrestling ==
Greco-Roman

Athlete	Event	Group Stage								Final	
Athlete	Event	Opposition Result	Opposition Result	Opposition Result	Opposition Result	Opposition Result	Opposition Result	Opposition Result	Rank	Opposition Result	Rank
Adrian Ponce	57 kg	Salah (IRQ); L 8–15	Chaambi (TUN); L 0–15	Did not advance					9	Did not advance	

Greco-Roman

Athlete	Event	Group Stage								Final	
Athlete	Event	Opposition Result	Opposition Result	Opposition Result	Opposition Result	Opposition Result	Opposition Result	Opposition Result	Rank	Opposition Result	Rank
Bernardo Olvera	52 kg	Vásquez (GUA); W Fall	Chertow (USA); L 7–10	Bourdin (FRA); L Passivity	Did not advance				8	Did not advance	
Jorge Olvera	57 kg	Šorov (YUG); L 1–11	Giordemaina (MLT); W 10–5	Noh (KOR); L 3–19	Did not advance				7	Did not advance	
Alfonso Jessel	74 kg	Nagy (HUN); L 1–14	Monday (USA); L Fall	Did not advance					10	Did not advance	
