= Frances Steinwedell =

American equestrian patron (1933 – 2024)

Frances "Fran" Blunt Steinwedell (1933 – April 8, 2024) was a founding member of the American Grand Prix Association, horse show organizer, patron and dedicated supporter of the sport of equestrian show jumping in the United States. She owned three horses ridden by Anne Kursinksi that would go on to be renowned champions, winning medals at the Olympic and Pan American Games. One of these, Starman, would be named the Show Jumping horse of the year. For her contributions to show jumping, she was named to the United States Show Jumping Hall of Fame in 2016.

== Biography ==
Steinwedell was born Frances Blunt in 1933 and grew up in Chicago, one of three daughters to Carleton Blunt, an attorney and property developer. She first became involved in horse sport in the Midwest, competing alongside her sister Carlene Blunt, a champion equestrian. In 1946, she produced one of the first all-junior horse shows in the United States. For her efforts, she received a certificate of honor from the Chicago Sun. As a rider, she won amateur hunter and jumper classes and championships.

In the 1950s, her family moved to Florida, where her father established the Village of Golf near Boynton Beach. Steinwedell married and later moved to California, where she worked to further develop equestrianism on the West Coast. There, she initiated the Grand Prix of Flintridge, which was one of the first FEI World Cup Qualifiers to be held in the western United States. There, she served as president of the Flintridge Riding Club, the oldest riding club west of the Mississippi and one of the most prestigious in the United States. She continued her riding career through the 1970s in California, competing as an Amateur-Owner in both hunt seat and show jumping. In 1976, she won the USEF Hunter Seat Medal Finals.

Steinwedell first met a four year old Anne Kursinksi when she came to take lessons At the Flintridge Riding Club. Kursinksi would later became best friends with Steinwedell's daughter Francie. Steinwedell would later go on to be one of Kursinksi's most important patrons and sponsors. Steinwedell's daughter, Francie Steinwedell-Carvin would also become a prominent equestrian.

=== USET Support ===
Steinwedell was a long time supporter of the United States Equestrian Team's Gold Medal Club, an initiative to advance American showjumping on the international stage. She was particularly notable for her syndicate ownership of three world class mounts for Olympian Anne Kursinski, Eros, Livius and Starman.

Livius, would earn both an individual and a team gold medal with Kursinski at the 1983 Pan American Games in Caracas, Venezuela. Livius and Kursinski would also travel as the reserve horse and rider pair to the 1984 Summer Olympics, and win the 1983 Grand Prix of Rome.

Starman would place fourth individually in show jumping at the 1988 Summer Olympics in Seoul, and win a team silver medal. Starman would be named the 1990 Show Jumping Horse of the Year by the Chronicle of the Horse, win the 1991 Grand Prix of Aachen, and be inducted in the Show Jumping Hall of Fame in 2012. Starman and Kursinski would compete at 11 Nations Cups together. Starman retired at age 15 and later went on to be a successful breeding stallion.

Eros and Kursinksi would compete at the 1996 Summer Olympic Games where they were a part of the silver medal-winning United States show jumping team. They would also go on to compete at the FEI World Equestrian Games, FEI World Cup Finals and Mexico's $450,000 Pulsar Grand Prix, the world's richest event at the time. Kursinksi credited Steinwedell's support of her as being integral to her to compete in the Olympics.

=== Later years ===
In 1992, Steinwedell was named the Pacific Coast Horse Shows Association Horsewoman of the year. She served on various boards related to horse sport, including the Pacific Coast Horse Shows Association, West Coast Equestrian, the United States Equestrian Team and the USET Foundation. In 2003, Steinwedell joined the board of the Show Jumping Hall of Fame.

In 2016, Steinwedell was inducted into the United States Show Jumping Hall of Fame for her contributions to the sport. In 2019, the United States Equestrian Team honored her with a special award for 40 years of contributions to the Gold Medal Club.

Steinwedell died at age 89 on April 8, 2024.
