= United States Show Jumping Hall of Fame =

The Show Jumping Hall of Fame and Museum is an American organization located at the Kentucky Horse Park in Lexington, Kentucky. It moved to the Kentucky Horse Park in 2010 and was previously located in facilities at Busch Gardens in Tampa, Florida. It came into existence in 1987 as a means to pay homage to the people and horses who have made outstanding contributions to the sport of show jumping.

== Inductees ==
Horses	People
1987 : Idle Dice; 1990 : San Lucas; 1992 : Snowman; 1995 : Trail Guide; 1996 : Heatherbloom — Jet Run; 1997 : Sun Beau; 1999 : Democrat — Sinjon; 2000 : Touch of Class; 2001 : Untouchable; 2002 : Calypso — Gem Twist; 2003 : Main Spring; 2004 : Snowbound; 2005 : For the Moment; 2008 : Abdullah — Miss Budweiser — Riviera Wonder; 2009 : Balbuco; 2010 : Good Twist; 2012 : Starman - Nautical; 2014 : I Love You; 2016 : The Natural; 2017 : Authentic (show jumping horse); 2017 : Sympatico (horse); 2018 : Bold Minstrel; 2020 : Sapphire; 2023 : Cedric	1987 : William Steinkraus — Bertalan de Némethy; 1988 : Patrick Butler — August A. Busch, Jr.; 1989 : Jimmy Williams — Frances Rowe — David T. Kelley — Ben O'Meara; 1990 : Harry D. Chamberlin — Kathy Kusner — Arthur McCashin; 1991 : Adolph Mogavero — Pat Dixon — Morton W. “Cappy” Smith — Whitney Stone; 1992 : Barbara Worth Oakford — Eleonora R. Sears — Mary Mairs Chapot; 1993 : Dr. Robert C. Rost — Joe Green; 1994 : Gordon Wright — Frank Chapot; 1995 : Michael G. Walsh; 1996 : Richard “Dick” Donnelly — Pamela Carruthers; 1997 : Bobby Egan — Edward “Ned” King; 1998 : Fred “Freddy” Wettach, Jr. — Melanie Smith Taylor — Johnny Bell; 1999 : Franklin F. “Fuddy” Wing, Jr. — Rodney Jenkins; 2000 : George H. Morris — Carol Durand; 2001 : Eugene R. Mische — Lt. Colonel John W. Russell — Robert J. Burke; 2002 : Honey Craven — Harry R. Gill; 2003 : J. Russell Stewart, Sr.; 2005 : Michael Matz; 2006 : Conrad Homfeld; 2007 : Joe Fargis — Karen Golding — Marcia “Mousie” Williams; 2008 : Dr. John Steele; 2009 : Neal Shapiro; 2010 : John D. Ammerman — Leonard A. King, Jr.; 2011 : Jane Clark — Gabor Foltenyi — Hap Hansen — Larry Langer; 2012 : Jerry Baker — Charles "Sonny" Brooks; 2013 : Daniel Marks — Seamus Brady — Steve Stephens; 2014 : Fitz Dixon — Guy Henry; 2015 : Katie Monahan Prudent — Susan Hutchison — Elizabeth Busch Burke; 2016 : Walter Devereux III — Frances Steinwedell — Anne Kursinski; 2017 : Hunter Harrison — Norman Dello Joio (equestrian); 2018 : Peter Doubleday — Robert Ridland — Colonel John W. "Gyp" Wofford; 2019 : Leslie Burr Howard — David Distler; 2020 : Margie Engle; 2021 : Beezie Madden — Mason Phelps, Jr.; 2022 : Linda Allen — Anthony D'Ambrosio; 2023 : Francisco "Pancho" Lopez
