= Guerdat =

Guerdat is a surname. Notable people with the surname include:

- Philippe Guerdat (born 1952), Swiss equestrian
- Steve Guerdat (born 1982), Swiss equestrian
