= Robert Gage =

Robert Gage may refer to:

- Bobby Gage (1927–2005), American football player
- Robert Gage (equestrian) (1952–2019), American equestrian show jumping rider and coach
- Robert Gage (MP) (c. 1519–1587), MP for Lewes
- Robert Gage (ornithologist) (1813–1891), Irish ornithologist and owner of Rathlin Island
- Robert Merrell Gage (1892–1981), American sculptor
