= Frank Chapot =

American equestrian (1932–2016)

Personal information
- Full name: Francis Davis Chapot
- Born: February 24, 1932 Camden, New Jersey, U.S.
- Died: June 20, 2016 (aged 84) Neshanic Station, New Jersey, U.S.
Medal record
Equestrian
Representing the United States
Olympic Games
Silver medal – second place	1960 Rome	Team jumping
Silver medal – second place	1972 Munich	Team jumping
Pan American Games
Gold medal – first place	1959 Chicago	Team jumping
Gold medal – first place	1963 São Paulo	Team jumping
Silver medal – second place	1959 Chicago	Individual jumping
Silver medal – second place	1967 Winnipeg	Team jumping

Francis Davis Chapot (February 24, 1932 – June 20, 2016) was an American equestrian who competed at six consecutive Olympic Games - from 1956 to 1976 - and won two silver medals in team show jumping, at Rome 1960 and Munich 1972. Chapot was chef d'equipe of the American equestrian team from 1980 to 2004, leading them to their first Olympic team gold at Los Angeles 1984. Additionally, he coached the American show jumping team from 1968 until his retirement in 2005. Chapot is also known for breeding and training Gem Twist, a champion showjumper named World's Best Horse in 1990. In later life, Chapot became a jump course designer and judge. In 2001, he was awarded the United States Equestrian Federation's Lifetime Achievement Award for his contributions to horse sport.

== Early life and education ==
Chapot was born in Camden, New Jersey to Frank Joseph Chapot, a salesman, and his wife Dorothy Davis Chapot. Chapot was raised in Walpack Township, New Jersey, on his family's farm. He graduated from nearby Pingry School in 1950. He earned a bachelor's degree at the Wharton School of the University of Pennsylvania in 1955.

== Career ==
Chapot spent two years serving in the United States air force. In 1956, while still on active duty in the air force, Chapot joined the American equestrian team.

He often attributed his success to being chosen as a member of the Olympic team and having a good relationship with Bertalan de Némethy, the aristocratic Hungarian who coached the U.S. show jumpers more than two decades and whose role Chapot assumed during the early 1980s. He also was invited to judge at many shows in the circuit.

He married fellow Olympic equestrian Mary Mairs in 1965. They were on the same Olympic show jumping team in 1964 and 1968, narrowly missing out on bronze in 1968 by 0.25 points. They retired to raise horses at Chado Farm, including the champion show jumper, Gem Twist, who won two Olympic silver medals and was named World's Best Horse at the 1990 World Equestrian Games in Stockholm. Gem Twist had an incredible career at the Grand Prix level. The gelding is the only horse to have won the "American Grand Prix Association Horse of the Year" title three times, and is regarded as having been one of the best show-jumpers in the history of the discipline. The Chapots had the horse cloned and began a breeding line from the clone.

== Awards and recognition ==
Chapot was inducted into the United States Show Jumping Hall of Fame in 1994, two years after his wife Mary.

== Personal life ==
Chapot married Mary Mairs in 1965, and they had two daughters, Laura and Wendy. Laura Chapot became a grand prix rider, while Wendy rides as an amateur jumper. A resident of the Neshanic Station section of Branchburg, New Jersey, Chapot died in Bound Brook, New Jersey, on June 20, 2016, at the age of 84 after declining health. He was survived by his wife Mary and their two daughters.

== See also ==
- List of athletes with the most appearances at Olympic Games
