= Jorge Alarcón =

Jorge Alarcón can refer to:

- Jorge Alarcón (footballer) (born 1956), Ecuadorian footballer
- Jorge Alarcón (swimmer) (born 1969), Mexican swimmer
