= Raimundas =

Raimundas is a Lithuanian masculine given name. It is a cognate of the name Raymond, and may refer to:

- Raimundas Čivilis (1959–2000), Lithuanian basketball player
- Raimundas Labuckas (born 1984), Lithuanian sprint canoer
- Raimundas Mažuolis (born 1972), former freestyle swimmer from Lithuania
- Raimundas Palaitis, (born 1957), Lithuanian politician
- Raimundas Udrakis (born 1965), Lithuanian-Soviet Olympic equestrian
