= George H. Morris =

American equestrian

Medal record

Equestrian

Representing the United States

Olympic Games
Silver medal – second place	1960 Rome	Team jumping

Pan American Games
Gold medal – first place	1959 Chicago	Team jumping

George H. Morris (born February 26, 1938) is an American equestrian. He won team silver in show jumping at the 1960 Rome Olympics and is considered a founding father of hunt seat equitation. He was chef d'equipe for the United States show jumping team, which won Olympic gold under his leadership, from 2005 until 2013. He also served as chef d'equipe for the Brazilian show jumping team at the 2016 Rio Olympics. Throughout his career, Morris has been a "proponent of the forward seat" and wrote several books on the subject, including Hunter Seat Equitation. Morris trained students at his Hunterdon Stables and traveling clinics, producing nationally and internationally successful riders, including Olympic champions. In 2019, after a United States Center for SafeSport investigation, Morris was banned for life from the United States Equestrian Federation (USEF) due to sexual misconduct with minors. Morris is likewise banned from coaching international teams for any country.

== Career ==
=== Early career: Rider ===
Morris grew up in, and began riding as a child in, New Canaan, Connecticut. He and his siblings rode with the New Canaan Mounted Troop, and by 1947, Morris was riding at the Ox Ridge Hunt Club. In 1948, he competed and won for the first time. By 1949, he began competing in equitation, and in 1950 he first competed in the Maclay Horsemanship Finals. By 1952, Morris was training with coach Gordon Wright and riding his first great horse, Game Cock. At age fourteen, Morris won the 1952 ASPCA Maclay Horsemanship Finals and AHSA Hunt Seat Equitation Medal Finals, making him the youngest rider to do so. Morris tried out for the 1956 Olympic Games team, placing second in the trials. However he was not named to the United States team. Morris briefly attended the University of Virginia in 1956, but later said, "I got very poor marks because riding and partying was about all I studied." In 1957, he joined the United States team on a national summer tour, and in 1958 competed in Europe for the first time. Morris represented the United States in international competition, winning team gold at the 1959 Pan American Games and team silver at the 1960 Rome Olympics. He also placed fourth individually at the Olympics. Morris rode on eight winning Nations Cup teams between 1958 and 1960.

Morris attempted an acting career in the early 1960s. With the help of agent Edith Van Cleve, he enrolled in the Neighborhood Playhouse School of Theater and performed in summer stock productions. After two years he returned to the horse world in 1962 or 1963 as a professional.

=== Later career: Coach, judge, chef d'equipe ===
Due to his status as a professional Morris could no longer compete for the United States team. He began a career teaching riding and training horses instead, producing many of the country's best riders in the 1960s, 1970s and 1980s. He trained with Gunnar Andersen for a year, then started his own farm in 1964, leasing Dave Kelley's Armonk, New York facility. One of his early students, Jimmy Kohn, won the 1964 AHSA Medal Finals. Throughout the late 1960s, Morris split his time between Connecticut, New York and New Jersey, traveling to train at different facilities and competitions. In 1971 he bought property in Pittstown, New Jersey to establish Hunterdon Stables. For roughly the next thirty years he trained students at Hunterdon Stables in hunters, jumpers and equitation. His former students include Olympians: Conrad Homfeld, Leslie Burr-Howard and Melanie Smith Taylor won team gold in 1984; Lisa Jacquin, Anne Kursinski and Norman Dello Joio competed in 1992; Burr-Howard, Kursinski and Peter Leone won team silver in 1996; Chris Kappler won team gold and individual silver in 2004.

In the 1980s, Morris began competing internationally again for a brief period. He broke his femur in a fall in 1986 and broke his neck a year later. In 1989, he retired his best horse, Rio, and by the early 1990s Morris decided to stop competing.

In the late 1980s, Morris became president of the United States Show Jumping Hall of Fame, and in 2000 he was inducted into the Hall of Fame.

In 2005 Morris decided to sell Hunterdon Stables and became chef d'equipe of the United States show jumping team. During his term as chef d'equipe, the team won gold in the 2005 Samsung Super League, team silver at the 2006 World Equestrian Games, team gold at the 2008 Beijing Olympics, and team gold and individual gold and silver at the 2011 Pan American Games. His last competition with the United States team was the 2012 London Olympics where the team finished sixth. His term as chef d'equipe ended in 2013, when he was replaced by Robert Ridland.

In 2016 Morris served as chef d'equipe for the Brazilian show jumping team at the Rio Olympics. George Morris was slated to be a clinician at the Hants County Exhibition in Nova Scotia in May/June 2016.

Morris served on the United States Equestrian Federation (USEF) National Jumper Committee and Planning Committee. He was president of the United States Show Jumping Hall of Fame for over thirty years, before stepping down in January 2019. After turning over the presidency to Robert Ridland, Morris remained on the Hall of Fame's board of directors. For many years, Morris taught horsemanship clinics designed to develop young riders.

=== Lifetime ban for sexual misconduct ===
On August 5, 2019, Morris was provisionally banned by the United States Center for SafeSport from USEF for sexual misconduct involving a minor. The ban was subject to appeal. In a statement issued that same day, Morris said, "I contest these findings wholeheartedly and am in the process of disputing them." Some former students and professional riders, in interviews with The New York Times, said they were aware of Morris' relationships with minors throughout his career and particularly in the 1970s. Others, including Eric Lamaze, Robert Dover, and former student Katie Monahan-Prudent defended Morris through an "I Stand With George" Facebook page and hashtag.

Independent arbitration regarding Morris' lifetime ban was held on November 7 and 8, 2019, in New York City. On November 19, 2019, after the appeal process ended, his lifetime ban was made permanent. Under the lifetime ban, which is reciprocated by the International Federation for Equestrian Sports (FEI), Morris is not able to coach international teams for any country. He is also prohibited from coaching USEF members.

== Legal issues ==
On August 5, 2020, two lawsuits were filed against Morris in New York's Manhattan Supreme Court; both suits allege the rape of minors, and seek financial damages. The lawsuits also target USEF, which the plaintiffs claim turned a blind eye to sexual abuse, which was an "open secret" in the equestrian community.

== Personal life ==
Morris was born in New York City, and grew up in New Canaan, Connecticut, the son of Alice Van Arden Frank Morris and Harry H. Morris Junior. Morris has said he inherited a "nervous constitution," and is "not crazy about people," but is "passionate about riding and about training horses." In his autobiography, Morris said that he partied at various clubs, including Studio 54, drank heavily, and has had several hundred sexual partners. He currently resides in Wellington, Florida where he keeps pet dogs, particularly beagles.

== Legacy, awards, and honors ==
Morris was honored with the George H. Morris Excellence in Equitation Championship, a competition held at the Winter Equestrian Festival from 2007 to 2019. The Hunterdon Cup, an equitation competition named after Morris' stables, was held from 2006 until 2019. On 26 November 2019, in the wake of Morris' lifetime ban, the USHJA announced that it had voted to eliminate two tributes to Morris: the Hunterdon Cup and the George H. Morris Trophy. The Hunterdon Cup was renamed the Gladstone Cup, while the George H. Morris Trophy was removed.

== Publications ==
Originally published in 1971, and now in its third edition, Morris' Hunter Seat Equitation often is recognized as the definitive work on the subject. Morris also has authored several other books and videos on riding and judging. Live broadcasts of training sessions led by Morris are featured on the United States Equestrian Federation (USEF) network.

In 1989, Morris began contributing to the Chronicle of the Horse magazine's "Between Rounds" section. Morris also wrote a column in the monthly equestrian magazine Practical Horseman, titled "Jumping Clinic," in which he critiqued the jumping form of riders in reader-submitted photographs. He wrote "Jumping Clinic" from 1977 until 2019, when showjumper Beezie Madden took over the column. He coined the term "drama riding" for the lack of classical position seen in riders in the show ring today.

=== Works ===
- Hunter Seat Equitation (1st ed. 1971, Rev ed. 1979, 3rd ed. 1990)
- The American Jumping Style: Modern Techniques of Successful Horsemanship (1993)
- George H. Morris Teaches Beginners to Ride (1st ed. 1981, reprinted 2006)
- Because Every Round Counts (2006)
- Designing Courses and Obstacles (Contributor, 1978)
- Unrelenting: The Real Story: Horses, Bright Lights, and My Pursuit of Excellence (Author with Karen Robertson Terry, 2016)

== See also ==
- Horse show
