= Alberto Rivera =

Alberto Rivera may refer to:

- Alberto Rivera (activist) (1935–1997), Spanish-American anti-Catholic activist
- Alberto Rivera (equestrian) (born 1954), Mexican Olympic equestrian
- Alberto Rivera (footballer) (born 1978), Spanish association footballer
- Albert Rivera (born 1979), Spanish politician

== See also ==
- Alberto Riveron (born 1960), American college football official
