= Robert Gage (equestrian) =

American equestrian and coach (1952–2019)

Personal information
- Nationality: United States
- Discipline: Show jumping
- Born: March 20, 1952
- Died: June 12, 2019 (aged 67); San Diego County, California, United States
- Home town: Rolling Hills, California, United States

Robert Gage (March 20, 1952 – June 12, 2019) was an American equestrian show jumping rider and coach. He was named West Coast Rider of the Year four times, received the American Grandprix Association's Rider of the Year Award two years in a row, and was a member of the U.S. World Cup team three times. Gage was banned on February 1, 2019, by the United States Center for SafeSport after it found that he had engaged in sexual misconduct with minors. On June 12, 2019, he died of suicide.

== Biography ==
When Gage was 11 years old, he and his family moved from Hermosa Beach to Rolling Hills, Southern California horse country. He became the Pacific Coast Junior Rider of the Year when he was 13 years old. Gage trained under Jimmy A. Williams, of the 1989 United States Show Jumping Hall of Fame. At 18, he switched to training and coaching for a decade.

In his late 20s, for one year Gage rode competitively in Venezuela. For much of the 1980s, he was one of the highest ranking American riders, competing in the United States and Europe. He was named West Coast rider of the year four times. He won the American Grandprix Association's Rider of the Year Award two years in a row, and at one point was the top ranking rider for 80 consecutive weeks. He was a member of the U.S. World Cup team three times, and in 1987 he won the Grand Prix of Del Mar.

Gage was a three-time World Cup Grand Prix rider. He placed 3rd in puissance in 1991 at the L.A. Equestrian Center.

As a trainer, Gage worked in San Diego County. Gage also served as an equestrian judge and ran clinics. In 1986 he played himself in the drama film Lightning, the White Stallion. Gage was a resident of Fallbrook, California, in northern San Diego County.

At age 67, Gage was banned on February 1, 2019, by the United States Center for SafeSport for sexual misconduct with minors. He learned on June 11 while awaiting his appeal that another alleged victim had come forward. On June 12, 2019, he died of suicide by hanging in north San Diego County.

== See also ==
- Puissance
- Show jumping
