= Alberto Carmona =

Venezuelan equestrian

Personal information
- Nationality: Venezuelan
- Born: 3 November 1961 (age 63)

Sport
- Sport: Equestrian

Alberto Carmona (born 3 November 1961) is a Venezuelan equestrian. He competed in the individual jumping event at the 1988 Summer Olympics.
