= Gregory McDermott =

Australian equestrian (born 1958)

Personal information
- Nationality: Australian
- Born: 5 September 1958 (age 66)

Sport
- Sport: Equestrian

Gregory McDermott (born 5 September 1958) is an Australian equestrian and horse trainer. He competed in the individual jumping event at the 1988 Summer Olympics.

McDermott was born in 1958 and grew up in Junee, New South Wales. He started out his working life as a shearer before moving to Western Australia to join a showjumping circuit set up by businessman Alan Bond.

McDermott was on a short list for the 1984 Summer Olympics but did not qualify. At the 1988 Summer Olympics, McDermott entered the individual jumping event with his horse Mr Shrimpton. Mr Shrimpton had appeared at the 1984 Olympics, ridden by Greg Eurell. In competition in Seoul, McDermott was forced to withdraw from the Olympics when Mr Shrimpton damaged a tendon.

During the 1990s, McDermott became a horse trainer. He trained Ossie Cossie to 19 wins from 59 starts between 1994 and 1998.

McDermott carried the Olympic torch in Wagga Wagga during the 2000 Summer Olympics torch relay.
