= Colin McIntosh =

New Zealand equestrian

Personal information
- Nationality: New Zealand
- Born: 1 June 1949 (age 75); Helensville, Auckland, New Zealand

Sport
- Sport: Equestrian

Colin McIntosh (born 1 June 1949) is a New Zealand equestrian. He competed in the team jumping event at the 1988 Summer Olympics.
