= Greg Best =

American equestrian (born 1964)

Personal information
- Full name: Gregory Alan Best
- Born: July 23, 1964 (age 62) Lynchburg, Virginia, U.S.
Medal record
Equestrian
Representing the United States
Olympic Games
| Silver medal – second place | 1988 Seoul | Individual jumping |
| Silver medal – second place | 1988 Seoul | Team jumping |
Pan American Games
| Silver medal – second place | 1987 Indianapolis | Team jumping |

Gregory Alan Best (born July 23, 1964) is an equestrian competitor and coach in the sport of show jumping who won two silver medals for the United States in the 1988 Summer Olympic Games in Seoul, South Korea riding the famous Gem Twist. In 1992, Best suffered a fall that shattered his shoulder. After this, he moved to New Zealand, where he rode for the New Zealand League, winning the World Cup Series. He has also served as a New Zealand National Show Jumping Selector, a National Show Jumping Coach and a member of the New Zealand Show Jumping High Performance Committee. Best coached New Zealand's jumpers for the 2004 Summer Olympic Games in Athens. Between 1987 and 2003, Best also garnered 6 FEI World Cup wins. He now conducts coaching clinics in the United States, Canada and New Zealand. Along with Gem Twist, horses named Santos and Entrepreneur have been among his champion mounts.

Best graduated from Gill St. Bernard's School in 1982. He has been a resident of Flemington, New Jersey.

== Accomplishments ==
- 1984 – Won the North American Young Rider Championships
- 1985 – USET Talent Derby
- 1986 – USET Foundation Lionel Guerrand-Hermès Memorial Award
- 1987 – American Grand Prix Association Champion, Grand Prix of Florida, Grand Prix of Tampa
- 1987 – Team silver Pan American Games
- 1988 – Individual and team silver for show jumping in Seoul Summer Olympic Games
- 1990 – Final four in the World Equestrian Games
- 2001/2002 season – winner FEI World Cup Jumping – Pacific League – New Zealand
