= Rodrigo González (swimmer) =

Mexican swimmer (born 1968)

Personal information
- Born: March 13, 1968 (age 58) Torreón, Coahuila, Mexico
Medal record
Swimming
Representing Mexico
Pan American Games
Bronze medal – third place	1991 Havana	100m Freestyle

Rodrigo González Sesma (born March 13, 1968, in Torreón, Coahuila, Mexico) is a retired Olympic freestyle swimmer. He competed at two consecutive Summer Olympics.

== International competitions ==
=== Summer Olympics ===
The first was the 1988 Summer Olympics in Seoul, South Korea, as part of the Mexico swimming team of seven men and three women that competed in 21 sporting events. The second was the 1992 Summer Olympics in Barcelona, Spain, as part of the Mexico swimming team of four men and five women that competed in 8 sporting events.

=== Pan American Games ===
He won the bronze medal in the Men's 100m Freestyle at the 1991 Pan American Games.
