= Lightning, the White Stallion =

- Home video release poster
- Directed by: William A. Levey
- Written by: Harry Alan Towers
- Produced by: Harry Alan Towers
- Starring: Mickey Rooney; Susan George; Isabel García Lorca; Billy Wesley; Martin Charles Warner; Françoise Pascal
- Cinematography: Steven Shaw
- Edited by: Ken Bornstein
- Music by: Maurizio Abeni; Anna-Karin Klockar
- Production companies: Cannon Films Inc. Cannon International; Mist Entertainment
- Distributed by: Cannon Film Distributors
- Release date: August 1986
- Running time: 95 minutes
- Country: United States
- Language: English

Lightning, the White Stallion is a 1986 American drama film directed by William A. Levey and written by Harry Alan Towers. The film stars Mickey Rooney, Susan George, Isabel García Lorca, Billy Wesley, Martin Charles Warner and Françoise Pascal. The film was released in August 1986, by Cannon Film Distributors.

== Plot ==
The horse of wealthy gambler Barney Ingram, Cloverdale III, is stolen by creditor Emmet Fallon. The horse is eventually stabled and renamed Lightning, but under the condition that he will be trained by a young rider as a racing horse.

== Cast ==
- Mickey Rooney as Barney Ingram
- Susan George as Madame Rene
- Isabel García Lorca as Stephanie Ward
- Billy Wesley as Lucas Mitchell
- Martin Charles Warner as Emmett Fallon
- Françoise Pascal as Marie Ward Leeman
- Read Morgan as Harvey Leeman
- Stanley Siegel as Jim Piper
- Jay Rasumny as Johnny
- Debra Berger as Lili Castle
- Murray Langston as Gorman
- Richard Lundin as Max
- Justin Lundin as Wiley
- Charles Pitt as Judge
- Sheila Colligan as Registrar
- Karen Davis as Melinda
- Claudia Stenke as Danielle
- Rob Gage as himself
- Jennifer Young as Rob Gage's Girlfriend
- Shannon McLeod as Daphne
- William A. Levey as Ophthalmologist
- John Warren James as Mailman
- Bradley C. Golden as Neighbor
- Ayanna DuLaney as Nurse
