= Katie Monahan-Prudent =

American equestrian

Personal information
- Birth name: Katie Monahan
- National team: United States
- Born: 1954 (age 70–71); Chicago
- Occupation: Equestrian
- Spouse: Henri Prudent

Achievements and titles
- National finals: American Grandprix Association Rider of the Year: 1982, 1986, 1988; American Invitational winner: 1983, 1985, 1988

Katie Monahan-Prudent (born c. 1954) is an American equestrian, best known as the 1986 World Champion in team showjumping, and the coach of Olympians Beezie Madden and Reed Kessler. Monahan-Prudent rose to prominence in the 1980s, when she was an Olympic team member, three-time American Invitational winner, and Whitney Cup recipient. In 2016, Monahan-Prudent was inducted into the Show Jumping Hall of Fame. She owns Plain Bay Farm, located in Middleburg, Virginia, with her husband Henri Prudent.

== Early life and junior career ==
Monahan-Prudent was born in Chicago. She began riding at age five. At age seven, she became the Illinois state champion in the thirteen-and-under junior hunter division. She spent much of her early career training at Cherry Blossom Farm in Virginia. In 1969, at age fifteen, she won the ASPCA Maclay Finals. Her mother died of cancer the same year. In 1972, she won the AHSA Medal Finals. Monahan attended Rutgers University, but dropped out after one year to train with George Morris in New Jersey.

== Career ==
Monahan-Prudent rode in her first FEI World Cup Final in 1979 and narrowly finished second. She was selected for the 1980 Olympic team representing the United States. However, due to the 1980 Summer Olympics boycott, she did not compete. In 1981, Monahan-Prudent bought Noren, a stallion, in Europe. In 1982, he was selected as Horse of the Year. Monahan-Prudent was named the American Grandprix Association Rider of the Year three times, in 1982, 1986, and 1988. Additionally, she won the American Invitational three times: in 1983 on Noren, in 1985 with The Governor, and in 1988 aboard Special Envoy. In 1986, Monahan-Prudent helped the United States showjumping team to victory at the World Championships in Aachen. In 1987 she was awarded the Whitney Stone Cup for her success as a rider and ambassador of horse sport.

== Personal life ==
Monahan-Prudent married French equestrian Henri Prudent in December 1986. She gave birth to her son, Adam, in 1989. In 1990, she suffered a near-fatal fall at Wellington's Winter Equestrian Festival.

After George Morris was accused of sexual misconduct and banned from the United States Equestrian Federation (USEF), Monahan-Prudent defended him in the "I Stand With George" Facebook group and an open letter.
