= Laura Tidball-Balisky =

Canadian equestrian

Personal information
- Nationality: Canadian
- Born: 2 March 1964 (age 62) Vancouver, British Columbia, Canada

Sport
- Sport: Equestrian
Medal record
Equestrian
Representing Canada
Pan American Games
| Gold medal – first place | 1987 Indianapolis | Team jumping |

Laura Tidball-Balisky (born 2 March 1964) is a Canadian equestrian. She competed in the team jumping event at the 1988 Summer Olympics.
