= Gem Twist =

American show jumping horse (1979–2006)

- Gem Twist at CSIO Lanaken 1990, ridden by Greg Best.
- Breed: Thoroughbred
- Sire: Good Twist
- Dam: Coldly Noble
- Maternal grandsire: Noble Jay
- Sex: Gelding
- Foaled: June 12, 1979
- Died: November 18, 2006
- Country: USA
- Colour: Gray
- Breeder: Frank Chapot
- Owner: Michael Golden
- Trainer: Frank Chapot

Earnings
- $800,000 USD

Awards
- Best Horse (1990 FEI WEG); AGA Horse of the Year

Gem Twist
Medal record

Olympics
Silver medal – second place	1988 Seoul	Individual jumping
Silver medal – second place	1988 Seoul	Team jumping

Pan American Games
Silver medal – second place	1987 Indianapolis	Team Jumping

Gem Twist (June 12, 1979 – November 18, 2006) was a 16.3 hands (67 inches, 170 cm) world champion American Thoroughbred show jumping horse registered under the name Icey Twist. Bred by equestrian Frank Chapot, Gem Twist had an incredible career at the Grand Prix level. The gelding is the only horse to have won the "American Grand Prix Association Horse of the Year" title three times, and is regarded as one of the best show-jumpers in history.

As Gem Twist was gelded and thus could not sire progeny, three clones were subsequently foaled after Gem Twist's death in 2006 and are primarily used for breeding German warmbloods in Europe.

== Career ==
Gem Twist had an extensive show jumping career between 1985 and 1997 under three different international level riders: Greg Best (up to 1992), Leslie Howard (1992-1995), and Laura Chapot (1995 onward).

Gem Twist began his career with rider Greg Best, winning the 1985 USET Talent Derby as a six-year-old. He went on to win his first two competitions at the Grand Prix level, the Grand Prix of Tampa and the Grand Prix of Florida, in 1987. He finished the year with his first American Grand Prix Association (AGA) Horse of the Year honor, as well as a team silver medal from the Pan American Games. Best continued to ride Gem Twist for several years, earning two silver medals at the 1988 Olympics in Seoul. In 1989, Gem Twist was named the American Grand Prix Association Horse of the Year for the second time. In 1990, he was named the "World's Best Horse" at the World Equestrian Games in Stockholm. After Best injured his shoulder in 1992, Gem Twist was turned over to Leslie Burr Howard (then Leslie Burr Lenehan).

Howard continued the gelding's career, winning both another AGA Horse of the Year title and the AGA Championship in 1993. The team qualified for the 1994 World Equestrian Games, but an infection occurring at the games disqualified Gem Twist from the championship round and put him out of competition for almost a year.

In 1995, after a lengthy recuperation period, Gem Twist returned to the show ring with Laura Chapot. In her first year with Gem Twist, she won the World Cup class at the $100,000 Autumn Classic, earning her the Budweiser Rookie of the Year award, and she rode the horse to his third win at the Budweiser AGA Championships. In their second season they had wins at three World Cup qualifying classes, including Tampa's Volvo Grand Prix of Florida—whose starting field of more than eighty horses made it the largest grand prix jumper class of all time. Gem Twist’s career finished with a win at the World Cup USA East League Championship, and Chapot formally retired him at the National Horse Show at Madison Square Garden on November 1, 1997.

During his career, Gem Twist accumulated more than $800,000 in prize money. In 2002, Gem Twist was inducted into the United States Show Jumping Hall of Fame. He was euthanized November 18, 2006 at the age of 27.

== Clones ==
In early 2006, Practical Horseman magazine first leaked a report that Gem Twist was to be cloned by a then-undisclosed international laboratory. Clones and their offspring would be eligible to compete in Olympic competitions, because horses can be of any breed or a mixed breed, and do not have to be purebreds recorded in a breed registry.

On September 15, 2008, the French genetic bank, Cryozootech, announced the successful birth of a healthy clone of Gem Twist, initially named "Gem Twin", and then later renamed "Gemini CL". He matured to 16.1 hands (65 inches, 165 cm) smaller than the original Gem Twist, who was 16.3 hands (67 inches, 170 cm). Gemini CL’s first crop of foals appeared in 2012, primarily out of German warmblood mares, though he also sired one foal from a Thoroughbred mare. As offspring of clones cannot be registered with the Jockey Club, the foal was registered with the Anglo European Studbook (AES). As of 2023, Gemini CL was listed by Groupe France Elevage for stud services. The website Horse Telex Pedigree listed a total of 217 offspring sired by Gemini CL as of 2023.

Horse & Hound magazine confirmed a second clone of Gem Twist, foaled in 2011, and named "Murka's Gem". Murka's Gem matured to 15.2 hands (62 inches, 157 cm) hands high, was officially registered in the Anglo-European Studbook (AES); and as of 2023 had sired 26 foals.. His offspring are registered under various warmblood and sport horse studbooks, and three have competed in International Federation for Equestrian Sports (FEI) events.

A third clone of Gem Twist, "Gem Twist Alpha Z" - was foaled in July 2012. He was bred by Frank Chapot, and is currently used to breed Zangersheide and Belgian Warmblood sport horses. He is registered in the Zangersheide studbook.

== Pedigree ==
Pedigree of Gem Twist
Sire Good Twist 1960	New Twist; 1955	Bonne Nuit; 1934	Royal Canopy (1914)
Sire Good Twist 1960	New Twist; 1955	Bonne Nuit; 1934	Bonne Cause (1915)
Sire Good Twist 1960	New Twist; 1955	Sisterly Love; 1945	Great War (1938)
Sire Good Twist 1960	New Twist; 1955	Sisterly Love; 1945	Brave Bonnie (1933)
Sire Good Twist 1960	Ianthe; 1946	Ethnos; 1934	Ethnarch (1922)
Sire Good Twist 1960	Ianthe; 1946	Ethnos; 1934	Ellanvale (1926)
Sire Good Twist 1960	Ianthe; 1946	Flying Salmon; 1936	King Salmon (1930)
Sire Good Twist 1960	Ianthe; 1946	Flying Salmon; 1936	Ballyhurry (1922)
Dam Coldly Noble 1970	Noble Jay; 1959	Double Jay; 1944	Balladier (1932)
Dam Coldly Noble 1970	Noble Jay; 1959	Double Jay; 1944	Broomshot (1926)
Dam Coldly Noble 1970	Noble Jay; 1959	Noble Nurse; 1954	Count Fleet (1940)
Dam Coldly Noble 1970	Noble Jay; 1959	Noble Nurse; 1954	Gallant Nurse (1946)
Dam Coldly Noble 1970	Eskimo Princess; 1964	Arctic Prince; 1948	Prince Chevalier (1943)
Dam Coldly Noble 1970	Eskimo Princess; 1964	Arctic Prince; 1948	Arctic Sun (1941)
Dam Coldly Noble 1970	Eskimo Princess; 1964	Ultra Royal; 1957	Royal Note (1952)
Dam Coldly Noble 1970	Eskimo Princess; 1964	Ultra Royal; 1957	Ultra (1947)
