= Ignacio Escamilla =

Mexican swimmer (born 1967)

Personal information
- Born: September 21, 1967 (age 58) Mexico City, Mexico

Sport
- Sport: Swimming
Medal record
Representing Mexico
Central American and Caribbean Games
Gold medal – first place	1990 Mexico City	4x100m freestyle relay
Gold medal – first place	1990 Mexico City	4x200m freestyle relay

Ignacio Escamilla (born 21 September 1967) is a Mexican former Olympic freestyle swimmer. He competed at the 1988 Summer Olympics in Seoul, South Korea, (aged 21 years, 3 days) as part of the Mexico swimming team of seven men and three women competing in 21 sporting events.
