= Alfredo Fernández =

Spanish equestrian (born 1964)

Alfredo Fernández-Durán
Personal information
- Full name: Alfredo Fernández-Durán Moreno
- Nationality: Spanish
- Born: 2 February 1964 (age 61); Madrid, Spain
- Height: 178 cm (5 ft 10 in)
- Weight: 60 kg (132 lb)

Sport
- Sport: Equestrian

Alfredo Fernández-Durán Moreno (Note: In this Spanish name, the first or paternal surname is Fernández-Durán and the second or maternal family name is Moreno.) (born 2 February 1964) is a Spanish equestrian. He competed in the team jumping event at the 1988 Summer Olympics.
