= New Albany Classic =

Event in Ohio, United States

The New Albany Classic Invitational Grand Prix and Family Day (generally referred to as "The New Albany Classic") was a unique day-long event held annually from 1998 to 2017 in New Albany, Ohio at the home of Leslie and Abigail Wexner. The event featured a myriad of family-focused activities including a USEF/FEI-sanctioned equestrian show, where riders competed for $125,000 in prize money. The "Concert at The Classic" featured top musical performers from around the world, and a large-scale family festival atmosphere which included rides, sports experiences, hands-on art activities, musical, and dance entertainment. The event served as the primary fundraiser for The Center for Family Safety and Healing, which seeks to break the cycle of family violence and provide support to victims of domestic abuse.

The last event took place on Sunday, September 24, 2017. By then, the event had hosted over 15,000 people annually, and raised over $32 million for victim's of domestic violence. A spokesperson said the event retired because the World Equestrian Games were occurring at the same time, in September, which made it difficult to attract competitors.

Past winners of The New Albany Classic:

- 2017 – Kent Farrington (riding Voyeur)
- 2016 – McLain Ward (riding Tina La Boheme)
- 2015 – Conor Swail (riding Simba De La Roque)
- 2014 – Shane Sweetnam (riding Chaqui Z)
- 2013 – Kent Farrington (riding Blue Angel)
- 2012 – McLain Ward (riding Pjotter Van De Zonnehoeve)
- 2011 – McLain Ward (riding Pjotter Van De Zonnehoeve)
- 2010 – Kent Farrington (riding Up Chiqui)
- 2009 – Jeffery Welles (riding Armani)
- 2008 – Todd Minikus (riding Pavarotti)
- 2007 – Darragh Kerins (riding Night Train)
- 2006 – Laura Chapot (riding Little Big Man)
- 2005 – Beezie Madden (riding Authentic)
- 2004 – McLain Ward (riding Goldika)
- 2003 – Laura Kraut (riding Quickstar II Z)
- 2002 – Aaron Vale (riding Nonix Le Parc)
- 2001 – Lauren Hough (riding Windy City)
- 2000 – Kimberly Frey (riding Bergerac)
- 1999 – Ellen Talbert (riding Hi-Vain)
- 1998 – Todd Minikus (riding Oh Star)

Concert at The Classic:

- 2017 – Nick Jonas
- 2016 – Kelsea Ballerini, Plaid Brixx, AJ Lehrman
- 2015 – Timeflies, Dove Cameron, Before You Exit, RaeLynn, Skylar Stecker
- 2014 – Fifth Harmony, Jake Miller, AJR, Sabrina Carpenter
- 2013 – Ariana Grande, Jana Kramer, Emblem3
- 2012 – Hot Chelle Rae, Conor Maynard
- 2011 – Big Time Rush, Greyson Chance
- 2010 – David Archuleta, New Hollow
- 2009 – Jordin Sparks, Mitchel Musso
- 2008 – Demi Lovato, Jordan Pruitt
- 2007 – The Jonas Brothers
