= John Anderson (equestrian) =

Canadian equestrian

Personal information
- Born: 16 December 1966 (age 58); Calgary, Alberta, Canada

Sport
- Sport: Equestrian

John Anderson (born 16 December 1966) is a Canadian equestrian. He competed in the individual jumping event at the 1988 Summer Olympics.
