= Thomas Batliner =

Liechtenstein equestrian (born 1959)

Personal information
- Nationality: Liechtenstein
- Born: 3 April 1959 (age 65); Chur, Switzerland

Sport
- Sport: Equestrian

Thomas Batliner (born 3 April 1959) is a Liechtenstein equestrian. He competed in the individual jumping event at the 1988 Summer Olympics.
