= Laura Kraut =

American equestrian (born 1965)

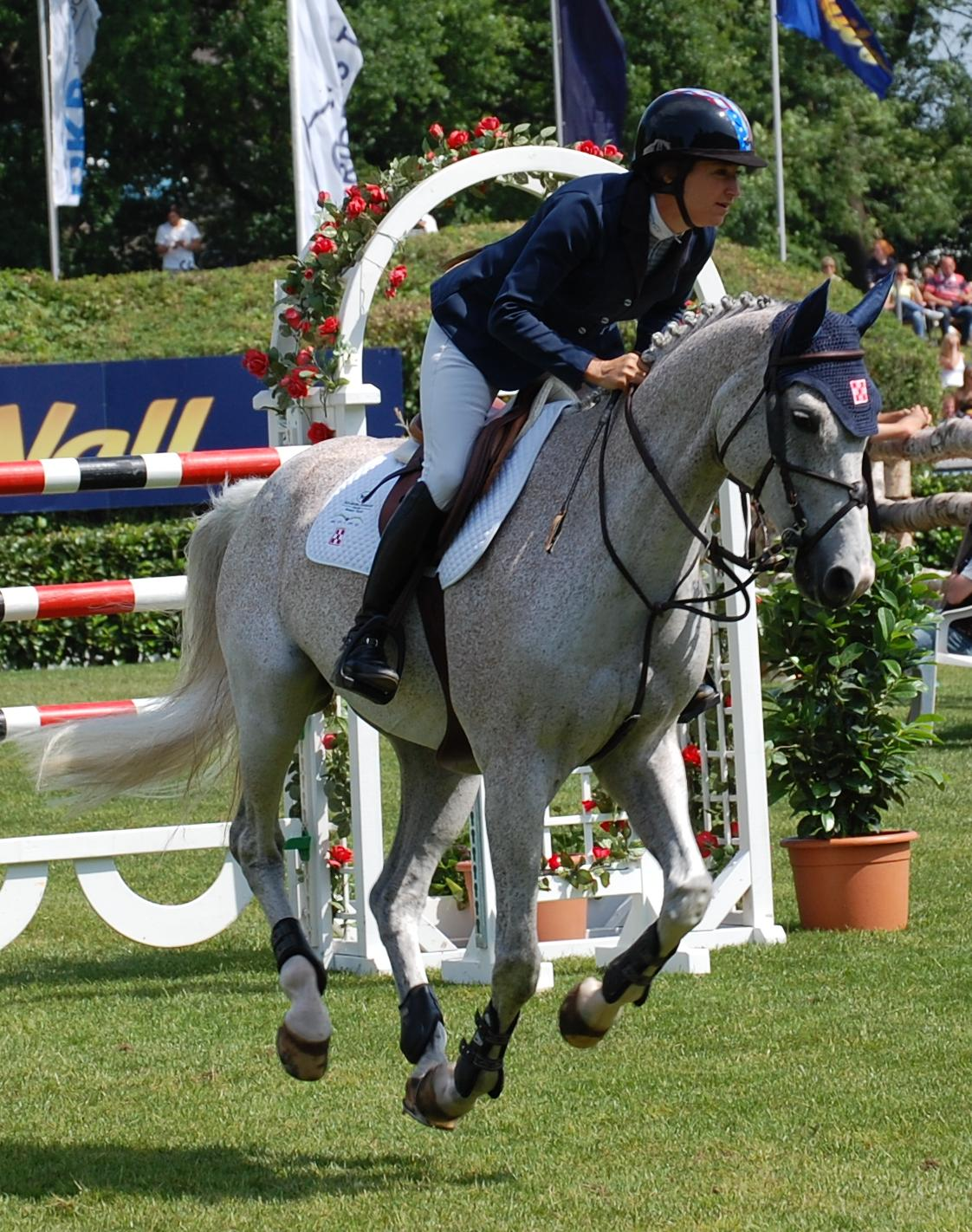
- Kraut with Cedric, "Championat von Hamburg", CSI 5* Hamburg 2011

Personal information
- Born: November 14, 1965 (age 60) Camden, South Carolina, U.S.
Medal record
Equestrian
Representing the United States
Olympic Games
Gold medal – first place	2008 Beijing	Team jumping
Silver medal – second place	2020 Tokyo	Team jumping
Silver medal – second place	2024 Paris	Team jumping
World Championships
Gold medal – first place	2018 Tryon	Team jumping
Silver medal – second place	2006 Aachen	Team jumping
Pan American Games
Gold medal – first place	2023 Santiago	Team jumping

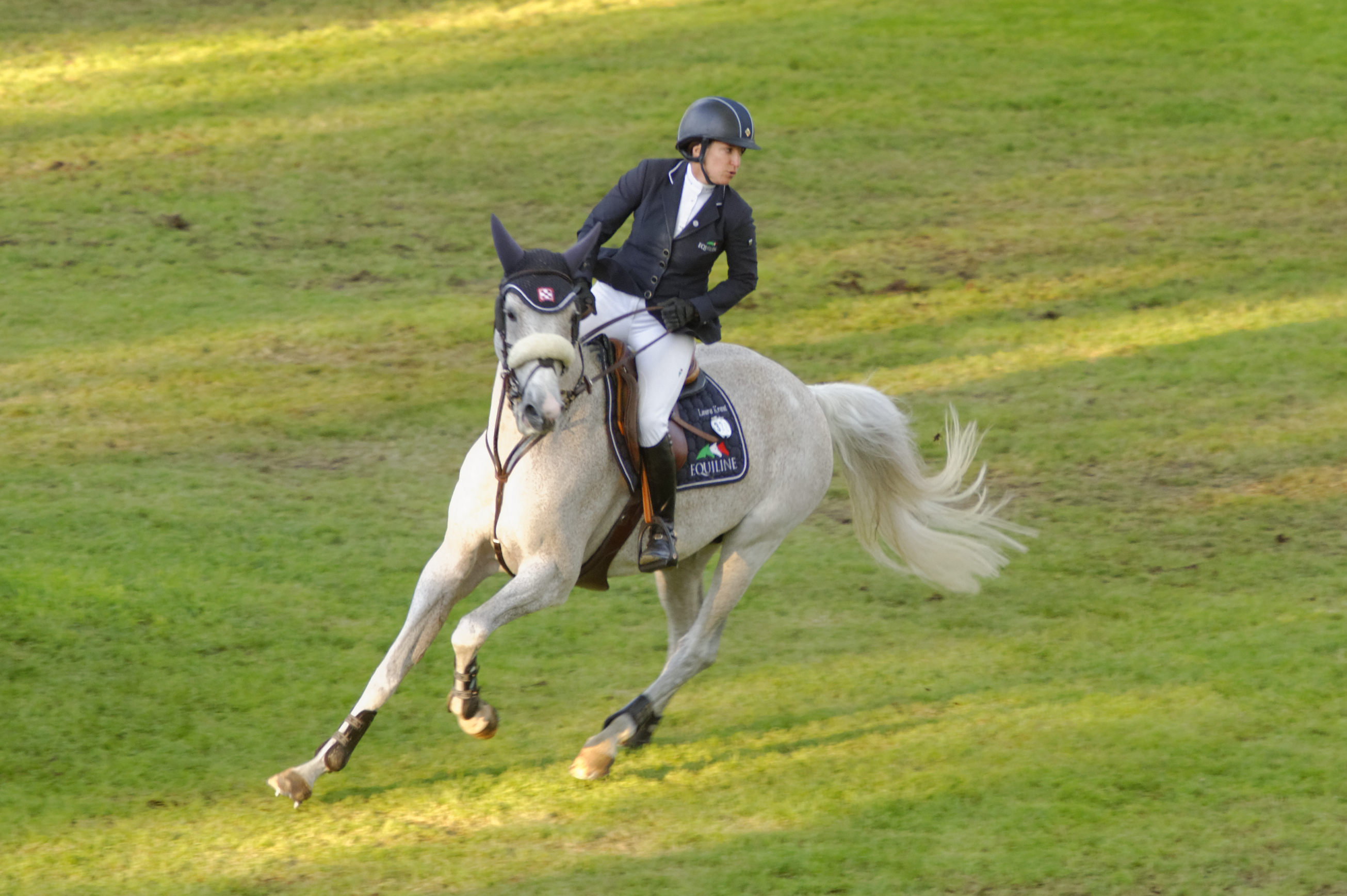
Kraut with Cedric at Internationalem Pfingst Turnier Wiesbaden 2013

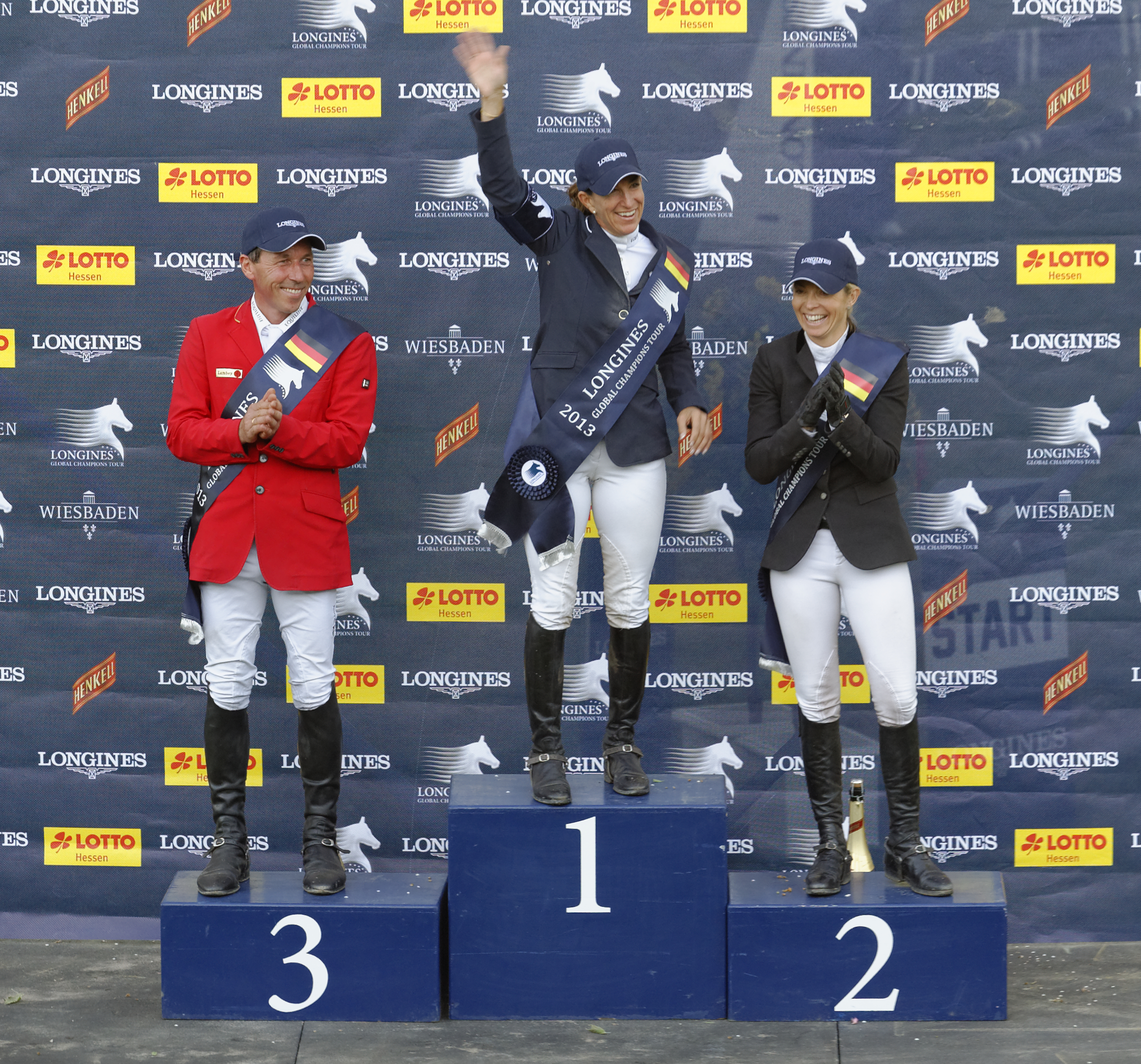
Kraut at Internationalem Pfingst Turnier Wiesbaden 2013 award ceremony.

Laura Kraut (/ˈkraʊt/ KROWT; born November 14, 1965) is an American show jumping competitor and Olympic champion.

At the 2008 Summer Olympics in Beijing, Kraut won the gold medal as part of the United States team with her horse Cedric in team jumping, together with McLain Ward, Will Simpson, and Beezie Madden.

In 2010, Kraut was featured in the television series A Rider's Story along with fellow Olympian McLain Ward.

Kraut has been recognized for her charitable contributions with equestrian-based charity, JustWorld International.

== Wins & Select Accomplishments ==
=== 2026 ===
- CSIO5* Dublin, IRE, 1st/Baloutinue
- CSI5* GCT/GCL Reisenbeck, GER, 1st/Baloutinue
- CSI2* WEC Grand Prix in Ocala FL, USA, 1st/Kaylee

=== 2025 ===
- CSIO5* Rolex Grand Prix of Dublin, IRE, 1st/Bisquetta
- CSIO5* Nations Cup, Rome, ITA, 1st/Bisquetta
- CSIO5* Aachen Prize of StädteRegion, GER, Emeraldo 4
- CSIO5* Longines League of Nations, Ocala FL, USA, 1st/Dorado 212
- CSI5*-W FEI World Cup, USA, 1st/Tres Bien Z
- CSI5* GCT/GCL St. Tropez, FRA, 1st/Lady D
- CSI4* Wellington FL, USA, 1st/Lady D
- CSI4* Ascona, Switzerland, 1st/Lady D
- CSIYH1* Valkenswaard, NED, 1st/Specialstar

=== 2024 ===
- CSI5* GCT/GCL of Reisenbeck, GER, 1st/Bisquetta
- CSI5* Manama Rose Show Stakes, Royal Windsor, ENG, 1st/Calgary Tame
- CSI3* Gassin-St Tropez Big Tour, FRA, 1st/Calgary Tame

=== 2023 ===
- PanAm Games Team Final, Santiago, CHI, 1st/Dorado 212
- FEI Nations Cup, San Juan Capistrano CA, USA, 1st/Dorado 212
- Nations Cup, San Miguel de Allende, MEX, 1st/Baloutinue
- Aachen VBR Prize, GER, 1st/Haley
- CSI5* Grand Prix of Wellington FL, USA, 1st/Baloutinue
- CSI4* Grand Prix of Chantilly, FRA, 1st/Bisquetta
- CSI4* Petit Finale of Deauville, FRA, 1st/Calgary Tame
- CSI3* St Tropez-Grimaud, FRA, 1st/Calgary Tame

=== 2022 ===
- CSI5*-W Toronto, CAN, 1st/Calgary Tame
- CSI4* Grand Prix of Wellington FL, USA, 1st/Confu
- CSI4* St Tropez-Grimaud, FRA, 1st/Bisquetta
- CSI2* Open at Knokke, BEL, 1st/Hera Fbh

=== 2021 ===
- CSIO3* Vejer de la Frontera, ESP, 1st/Hera Fbh
- CSI3* Grand Prix of Wellington FL, USA, 1st/Baloutinue
- CSI2* Open Grand Prix at Valkenswaard, NED, 1st/Haley
- CSI2* St Tropez-Grimaud, FRA, 1st/Greatfull

=== 2020 ===
- CSIO5* Nations Cup, Wellington FL, USA, 1st/Confu
- CSI3* Grand Prix of Wellington FL, USA, 1st/Confu
- CSI2* Grand Prix St Tropez-Grimaud, FRA, 1st/Goldwin
- CSI2* Kronenberg, NED, 1st/Galliano VM
- CSI2* Grand Prix Opglabbeek, BEL, 1st/Casco Bay
- CSIO3* Grand Prix Vejer de la Frontera, ESP, 1st/Casco Bay

=== 2019 ===
- CSIYH1* Le Touquet, FRA, 1st/Goldwin
- CSI5* Brussels, BEL, 1st/Constable II
- CSI4*-W World Cup, Washington DC, USA, 1st/Fleurette
- CSI4* Grand Prix St Tropez-Grimaud, FRA, 1st/Fleurette
- CSI2* Kronenberg, BEL, 1st/Greatfull

=== 2018 ===
- World Equestrian Games, Tryon NC, USA, Team Gold/Zeremonie

=== 2015 ===
- CS12* Wellington FL, USA, 1st/Cedric

=== 2014 ===
- CSI3* Grand Prix of Verbier, SUI, 1st/Carolina 31
- CSI2*-W World Cup, Wellington FL, USA, 1st/Cedric
- CSIYH1* Fontainbleu, FRA, 1st/Constable II
- CSIYH1* Chantilly, FRA, 1st/Constable II
- CSIYH1* Vilamoura, POR, 1st/Constable II

=== 2013 ===
- CSI5* GCT Grand Prix of Madrid, ESP, 1st/Wotsamillion
- CSI5* GCT Grand Prix of Wiesbaden, GER, 1st/Cedric
- CSI5* GCT Cascais-Estoril, POR, 1st/Jubilee D'Ouilly

=== 2011 ===
- CSI5* Grand Prix of Wellington FL, USA, 1st/Cedric

=== 2010 ===
- CSI5* Competition IV of Brussels, BEL, 1st/Cedric
- Grand Prix of Chantilly, FRA, 1st/Cedric

=== 2009 ===
- 150,000 euro Grand Prix of Madrid, ESP, 1st/Anthem

=== 2008 ===
- Olympic Trials at Wellington FL, USA, 1st/Cedric
- Beijing Olympics, Hong Kong, Team Gold/Cedric
- $500,000 Grand Prix of Charlotte NC, USA, 1st/Anthem
- Masters Class, Antwerp, BEL, 1st/Miss Independent
- Rolex Grand Prix of Brussels, BEL, 1st/Miss Independent
- Credit Suisse Grand Prix, Geneva, SUI, 1st/Miss Independent
- London Olympia, ENG, 1st/Miss Independent

=== 2007 ===
- CSIO* Madrid, ESP, 1st/Anthem
- CSIO* Rotterdam, NET, 1st/Anthem
- CSI *** Belfast, Northern Ireland, 1st/Anthem
- CSI*** Hachenburg, GER, 1st/Cedric

=== 2006 ===
- World Equestrian Games Team Silver, Aachen, GER, Miss Independent
- Samsung Super League, Team Silver, Miss Independent

=== 2005 ===
- $75,000 Cosequin Florida Open, Wellington FL, 1st/Miss Independent
- $60,000 Lincoln Idle Dice Classic, Wellington FL, 1st/Anthem
- Samsung Super League Team Member, Baule, FRA, Aachen, Germany, team 1st
- Rome, Italy, Hickstead, England, team 2nd/Anthem & Miss Independent
- $100,000 Washington International President’s Cup, 1st/Anthem

=== 2004 ===
- $75,000 Grand Prix of Tampa FL, USA, 10th/Allegiance
- $25,000 WEG Challenge Cup round 8, Tampa FL, USA, 10th/Allegiance
- $50,000 Samsung Nations Cup, Wellington FL, USA, 2nd/Allegiance
- $60,000 Idle Dice Challenge, Wellington FL, USA, 6th/Allegiance
- $25,000 WEF Challenge Series, Wellington FL, USA, 6th/Allegiance
- $25,000 National Speed Stake, Wellington FL, USA, 4th/Liberty
- Super League Team Member

=== 2003 ===
- Budweiser Grand Prix de Penn National, Harrisburg, PA 2nd/Anthem
- Grand Prix of Minnesota, Minneapolis, MN 1st, 2nd/Wet Paint
- $25,000 New Albany Classic, New Albany, Ohio 1st/Quickstar II Z
- $150,000 Prudential Financial Grand Prix, Bridgehampton, NY 7th/Allegiance
- $25,000 Sally Hansen Grand Prix, Bridgehampton, NY 2nd/Quickstar II Z
- Russell Fortune Grand Prix, Zionsville, IN 1st/Quickstar II Z
- $40,000 Kentucky Classic Grand Prix, Lexington, KY 3rd/Milano
- $25,000 Lexington Classic, Lexington, KY 5th/Milano
- $100,000 American Jumping Classic, Kings Mills, OH 4th/Anthem
- BMO Financial Group Nations Cup, Calgary, Canada 3rd/Anthem
- Pan American Games Selection Trial 4 4th/Anthem
- $50,000 Commonwealth Grand Prix, Lexington, KY 4th/Anthem
- $100,000 U.S. Open CH CSIO****, Wellington, FL 4th/Allegiance
- $75,000 Florida Open CSI***/W, Wellington, FL 8th/Anthem
- $75,000 Zada Enterprises Grand Prix CSI***, Wellington, FL 2nd/Anthem
- $25,000 WEF Challenge Series, Wellington, FL 2nd/Allegiance
- $50,000 Idle Dice Classic, Wellington, FL 5th/Anthem
- $25,000 Kilkenny WEF Challenge Cup, Wellington, FL 3rd/Allegiance
- $25,000 WEF Challenge Cup II CSI, Wellington, FL 4th/May
- $25,000 WEF Challenge Cup I CSI**, Wellington, FL 6th/Liberty
- 7th/Anthem
- USOC Jack Kelly Fair Play Award
- World Cup Final, Las Vegas, NV Tie 5th/Anthem

=== 2002 ===
- World Cup Final, Leipzig, Germany 17th/Anthem
- Grand Prix, Rome, Italy 2nd/Anthem
- Bank of Montreal Nations Cup, Calgary, Canada 1st/Anthem
- Pennsylvania Big Jump, Harrisburg, Pennsylvania, U.S. 1st/Allegiance
- Grand Prix of Minnesota, St. Paul, Minnesota, U.S. 1st/May
- $200,000 Atco Power Queen Elizabeth ll Cup, Spruce Meadows, Calgary, Alberta, Canada 2nd /Liberty
- Samsung Nations Cup, Lucerne, Switzerland 1st (tie)/Liberty
- $105,705 Loro Piana Grand Prix, Rome, Italy 2nd/Anthem
- Samsung Nations Cup, Wellington, Florida, U.S. Team 1st
- $25,000 Jaguar/Land Rover WEF Challenge Cup 1st/Anthem
- $200,000 Budweiser American Invitational, Tampa, Florida, U.S. 2nd/Anthem
- $25,000 WEF Challenge IV, Wellington, Florida, U.S. 1st/Anthem

=== 2001 ===
- Samsung Nations Cup, Royal Winter Fair-Toronto, Ontario, Canada 1st/Anthem
- Budweiser Grand Prix de Penn National, Harrisburg, PA 1st/Anthem
- $50,000 Budweiser Grand Prix of Indianapolis, Zionsville, IN 1st/Liberty
- $100,000 Cosequin US Open Jumper Championship, Wellington, FL 1st/Liberty
- $75,000 American Jumping Classic, Kings Mills, OH 1st/Anthem
- $50,000 Commonwealth Grand Prix, Lexington, KY 1st/Liberty

=== 2000 ===
- Olympic Games, Sydney, Australia Team 6th/Liberty
- $125,000 Budweiser Grand Prix of New York, New York, NY 3rd/Anthem
- $50,000 Budwesier Grand Prix De Penn National, Harrisburg, PA 1st/Anthem
- $100,000 Rolex/U.S. Show Jumping Championship, Gladstone, NJ 1st/Liberty
- $100,000 Cosequin Wellington Finale CSI-W, Wellington, FL 2nd/Liberty
- Olympic Selection Trials, Gladstone, NJ, the Oaks/Blenheim & Del Mar, CA 3rd/Liberty
- $100,000 Mayor’s Jewelers U.S. Open Jumper Championship, Miami, FL 2nd/Liberty
- $50,000 Mary Rena Murphy Grand Prix, Lexington, KY 1st/Simba Run
- $30,000 Kentucky Grand Prix, Lexington, KY 1st/Athletico

=== 1998 ===
- Nortel Queen Elizabeth II Cup, Calgary Alberta, Canada 1st/Simba Run

=== 1997 ===
- $30,000 Motor City Grand Prix, Detroit, MI 1st/Classified

=== 1996 ===
- $50,000 Budweiser Indianapolis Grand Prix 1st/Simba Run

=== 1995 ===
- $35,000 North American Grand Prix 1st/Felix
- $30,000 Kentucky Spring Classic, Lexington, KY 1st/Simba Run

=== 1992 ===
- Alternate, Olympic Games, Barcelona, Spain/Simba Run

=== 1988 ===
- $50,000 Sweet Charity Farm Grand Prix, Carmel, IN 1st/Athletico
