= Héctor Pérez (cyclist) =

Mexican cyclist (born 1959)

Personal information
- Born: 7 July 1959 (age 67)

Cycling career
- Sport: Cycling

Héctor Pérez (born 7 July 1959) is a Mexican former cyclist. He competed in two events at the 1988 Summer Olympics.
