= Jack Doyle (equestrian) =

Irish equestrian

Personal information
- Nationality: Irish
- Born: 31 October 1958 (age 66)

Sport
- Sport: Equestrian

Jack Doyle (born 31 October 1958) is an Irish equestrian. He competed in two events at the 1988 Summer Olympics.
