= Sergejs Šakurovs =

Latvian equestrian (born 1958)

Personal information
- Nationality: Latvian
- Born: 25 April 1958 (age 67) Riga, Latvian SSR, Soviet Union

Sport
- Sport: Equestrian

Sergejs Šakurovs (born 25 April 1958) is a Latvian equestrian. He competed in two events at the 1988 Summer Olympics.
