= Paulo Stewart =

Brazilian equestrian

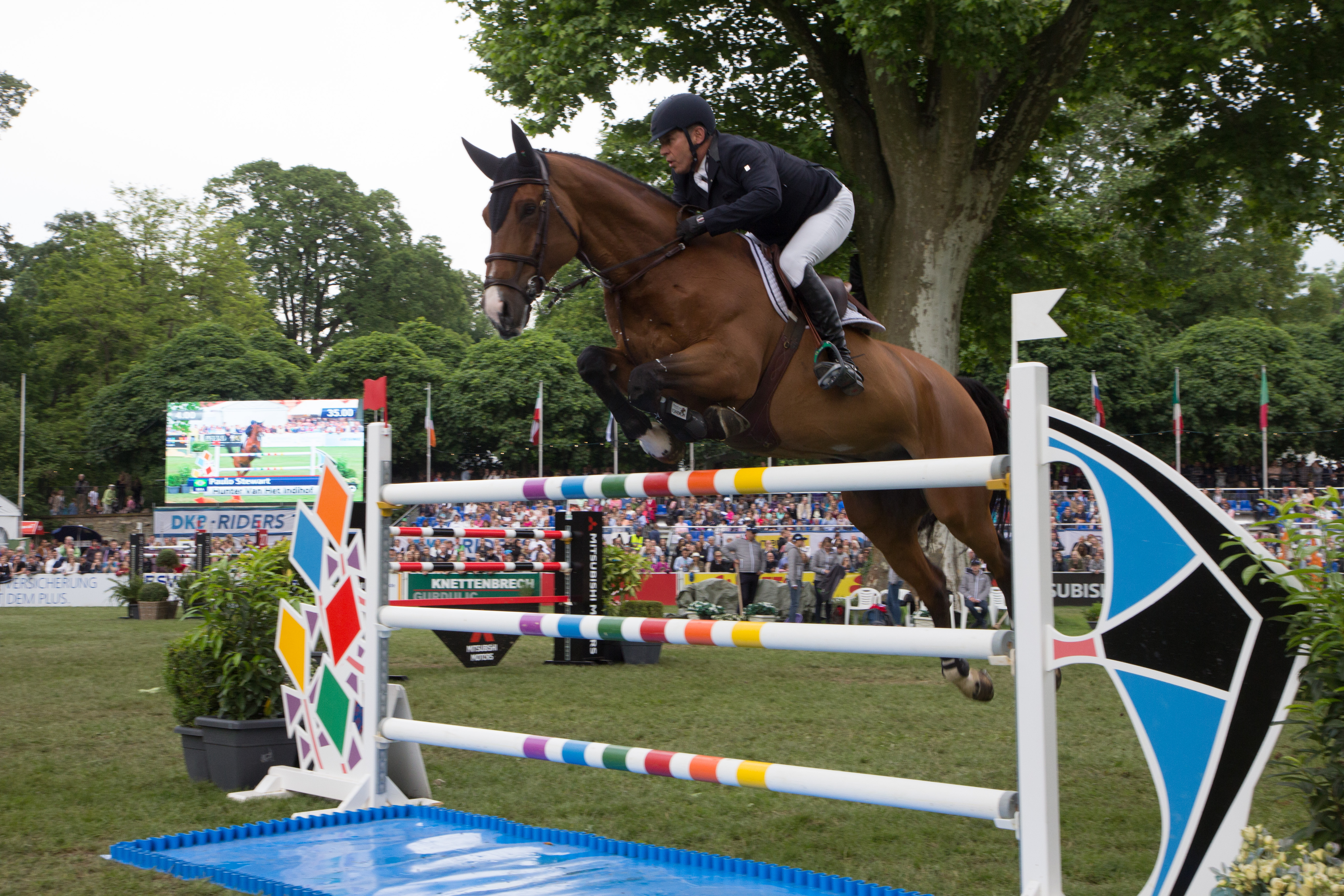

Personal information
- Born: 20 May 1964 (age 60); Rio de Janeiro, Brazil

Sport
- Sport: Equestrian

Paulo Stewart (born 20 May 1964) is a Brazilian equestrian. He competed in two events at the 1988 Summer Olympics.
