= Alejandro Orózco =

Mexican equestrian (born 1965)

Personal information
- Nationality: Mexican
- Born: 12 February 1965 (age 60)

Sport
- Sport: Equestrian

Alejandro Orózco (born 12 February 1965) is a Mexican equestrian. He competed in the individual jumping event at the 1988 Summer Olympics.
