= Rodney Brown (equestrian) =

Australian equestrian

Personal information
- Nationality: Australian
- Born: 31 October 1948 (age 76); Melbourne, Australia

Sport
- Sport: Equestrian
- Event: Show jumping

Rodney Brown (born 31 October 1948) is an Australian equestrian. He competed in two events at the 1988 Summer Olympics.
