= Cedric (show jumping horse) =

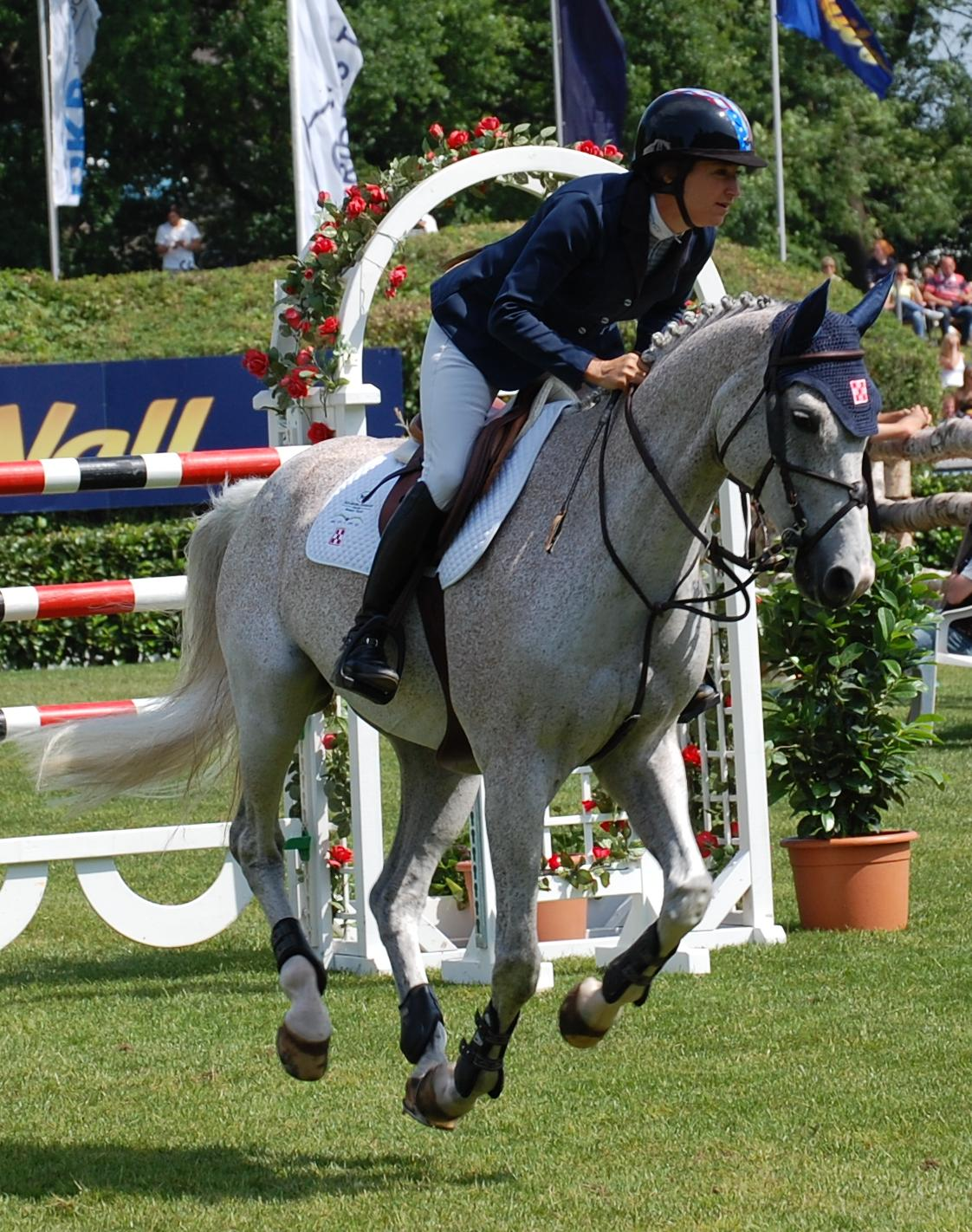
- Cedric ridden by Laura Kraut
- Breed: Holsteiner
- Discipline: Show jumping
- Sex: Gelding
- Foaled: May 11, 1998
- Color: Gray
- Trainer: Laura Kraut

Major wins
- Team gold in 2008 Olympic Games

Cedric is a Holsteiner horse which competes internationally in the sport of show jumping. With rider Laura Kraut, he was part of the gold medal-winning American team in the Beijing Olympics.

== Life and career ==
Cedric is a gray Holsteiner gelding, standing 15.2 hands (62 inches, 157 cm) high. He was foaled in Belgium and at the age of seven was purchased by American rider Laura Kraut, who took him to the United States and began competing on him. Cedric and Kraut won the United States Equestrian Team's Olympic selection trial in 2008 and competed in the Beijing Olympic Games, winning team gold. In 2014, Kraut and Cedric won the Holidays and Horses $50,000 Grand Prix competition. In early 2015, they won the Trump Invitational Grand Prix. Later the same year, Traut and Cecil won the $150,000 Ocala Grand Prix in Florida.
