= Wout-Jan van der Schans =

Dutch equestrian

Personal information
- Nationality: Dutch
- Born: 12 May 1961 (age 64); Ede, Netherlands

Sport
- Sport: Equestrian

Wout-Jan van der Schans (born 12 May 1961) is a Dutch equestrian. He competed in two events at the 1988 Summer Olympics.
