= Pierre Durand (equestrian, born 1955) =

French show jumping equestrian

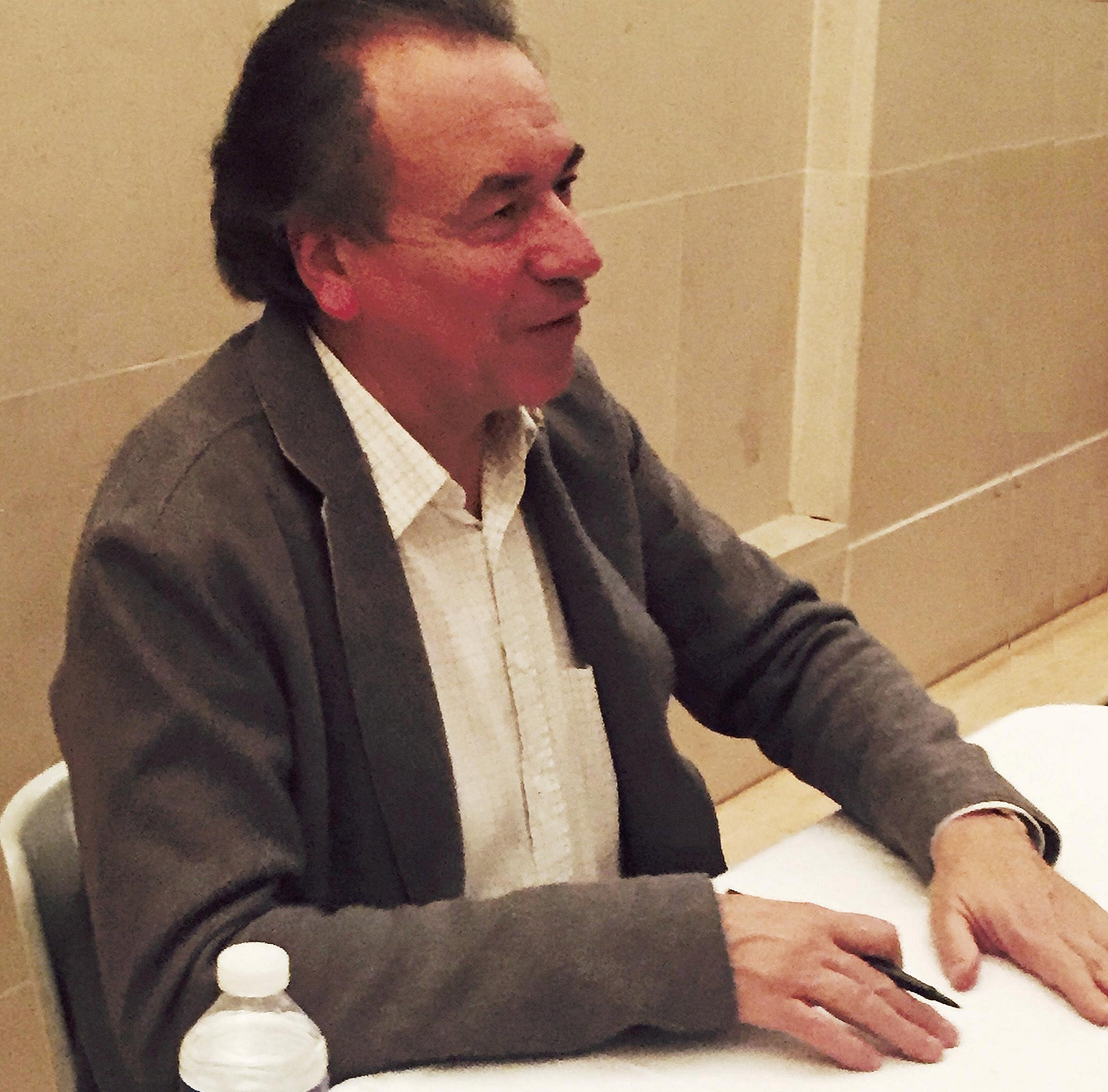
- Durand in 2016

Medal record

Men's equestrian

Representing France

Olympic Games
Gold medal – first place	1988 Seoul	Individual jumping
Bronze medal – third place	1988 Seoul	Team jumping

World Championships
Gold medal – first place	1990 Stockholm	Team jumping

Pierre Durand (born 16 February 1955) is a French show jumping champion, and 1988 Olympic champion.

== Olympic record ==
Durand participated at the 1988 Summer Olympics in Seoul, where he won a gold medal in Individual Jumping, and also a team bronze medal.

== In film ==
Durand is played by Guillaume Canet in Jappeloup, a film by Christian Duguay about the bond he developed with Jappeloup until they won at the Olympics. He sued the producers for misuse of the brand "Jappeloup".
