= Margie Goldstein-Engle =

American equestrian

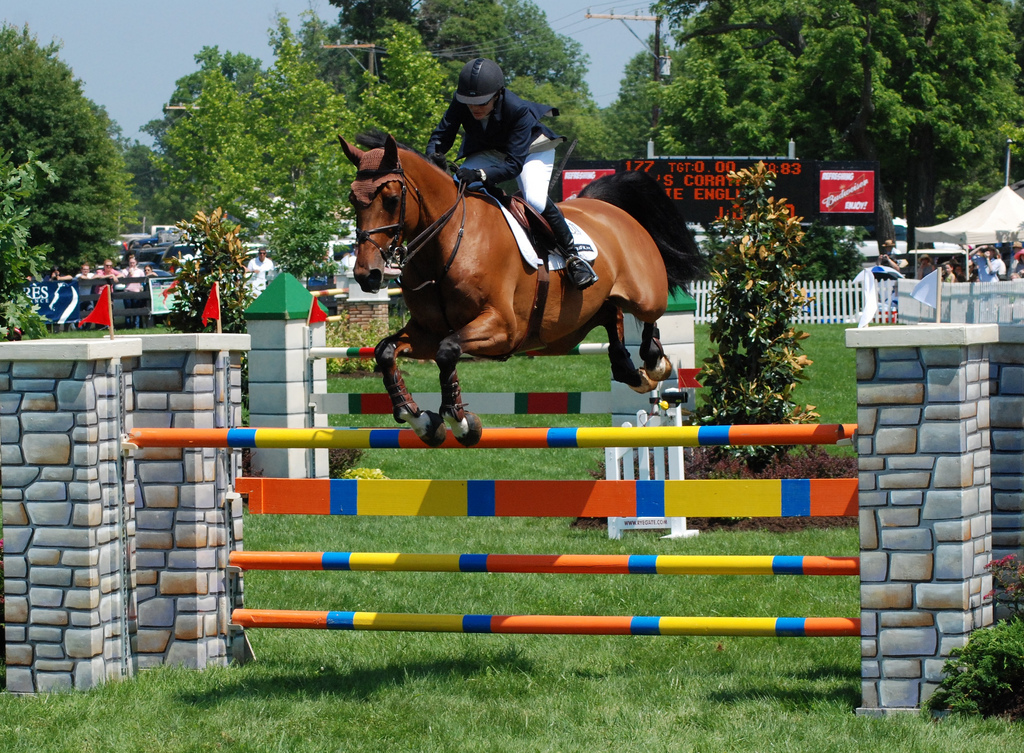
- Goldstein-Engle on Coraya Z; June 7, 2009

Personal information
- Nationality: American
- Born: Margie Goldstein; March 31, 1958 (age 68) Miami, Florida
- Height: 5 ft 1 in (1.55 m)
- Weight: 105 lb (48 kg)

Sport
- Sport: Equestrianism
- Event: Show jumping

Achievements and titles
- National finals: 10x Rider of the Year (American Grand Prix Association)
- Personal best: World-record-high jump of 7 feet 8 3/4 inches (2.356 m) in 1987
Medal record
Equestrian
Representing United States
Pan American Games
Silver medal – second place	1999 Winnipeg	Team jumping
Gold medal – first place	2003 Santo Domingo	Team jumping
Bronze medal – third place	2003 Santo Domingo	Individual jumping
World Equestrian Games
Silver medal – second place	2006 Aachen	Team jumping

Margie Goldstein-Engle (born March 31, 1958) is an American show jumping equestrian, and a 10-time American Grandprix Association Rider of the Year.

== Early and personal life ==
She was born in Miami, Florida, to Mona (an elementary school principal and teacher) and Irvin Goldstein (an accountant), and is Jewish. She grew up in her middle-class family in South Miami, Florida, with two older brothers. In third grade, she became passionate about horses.

At the age of nine, she took jobs at horse barns and dog kennels as a way to pay for riding lessons. Less affluent than other riders, she said: "You're maybe not dressed like the other riders. You don't have the custom things, you don't have the top clothing, and a lot of my stuff was hand-me-downs.... It was more cliquish than anything. They'd more snub you than tease you."

She attended South Miami High School and North Miami Beach High School, and graduated from Florida International University with a 4.0 GPA, majoring in business education. She married her husband, horse veterinarian Steve Engle, in 1995.

== Equestrian career ==
Goldstein-Engle won 6 World Cups and 20 Nations Cups between 1984 and 2005. The FEI (Federation Equestre Internationale) ranked her as high as # 6 all-time.

In 1987, she recorded a world-record-high jump of 7 feet 8 3/4 inches (2.36 m). Speaking of such high jump event, she said: "You have to figure the horse either has a lot of trust, or a lot of heart, because once the wall gets over six and a half feet, it looks more like the side of a building."

In 1991, she suffered broken bones and nerve damage in her left foot as the result of a fall at a horse show. Doctors told her she would likely not ever walk normally again. The following week, she was again riding, and 10 weeks later she resumed competing. In 1992, a 1,200-pound (540 kg) horse fell on her at a show, opening a deep 12-inch (300 mm) cut on her back and breaking four of her ribs. In July 1998, she received injuries to her face as the result of a fall. She rode the next day. She has also fractured her left shoulder, and broken her collarbone twice, her arm, her wrist, and two fingers.

At the 1999 Pan American Games in Winnipeg, she won a silver medal with the U.S. jumping team (riding Alvaretto). She competed for the U.S. 2000 Olympics team in Sydney, Australia. She won a team gold medal and an individual bronze medal at the 2003 Pan American Games, and a silver medal with the U.S. team in the 2006 World Equestrian Games (riding Quervo Gold).

Goldstein-Engel was the American Grandprix Association's (AGA) only ten-time Rider of the Year. She won the award in 1989, 1991, 1994, 1995, 1996, 1999/2000, 2000/2001, 2003, 2005, and 2006. She was also the 1991 American Horse Shows Association Equestrian of the Year.

Goldstein-Engle set a record with career show-jumping earnings of more than $4 million. She has more than 195 Grand Prix victories, and as of October 2011 she was the all-time career leader in Grand Prix wins. She set a record with most Grand Prix wins in a single season (11; on Saluut II).

=== Halls of Fame ===
In 2001, she was honored by the U.S. Jewish Sports Hall of Fame, and in 2009 she was inducted into the International Jewish Sports Hall of Fame. On 25 March 2021, she was inducted into the US Show Jumping Hall of Fame.

== See also ==
- List of select Jewish equestrians
