= Joe Túri =

Hungarian equestrian (1956–2003)

Personal information
- Full name: József Túri
- Nationality: Hungarian
- Born: 18 November 1956; Nagykőrös, Hungary
- Died: 30 April 2003 (aged 46); Kecskemét, Hungary

Sport
- Sport: Equestrian

Joe Túri (Hungarian: Túri József; 18 November 1956 – 30 April 2003) was a Hungarian equestrian. In 1973, he defected to Great Britain, and competed in two events at the 1988 Summer Olympics for the British team. Turi won gold at the 1989 European Show Jumping Championships in the team event. He would later also represent Hungary at the 2000 Summer Olympics.

Turi developed a boyhood passion for horses. His father had wanted him to train as an engineer; instead he went to work for a troupe of Hungarian trick riders known as the Csikos. It was during 1973, at the end of a tour to England with the Czikos that he defected aged just 16 when the lorry they were travelling in slowed down at a traffic light in Dover. Turi had initially planned to defect in West Germany on an earlier part of the tour but the travelling party didn't slow down sufficiently for him to make the leap. Despite having limited English he got a job at a riding school before then switching to a racing yard in Newmarket. After a year he used his savings to buy a horse, intending to train it into a show jumper. It was a horse called Vital that he rode at the Olympics Andrew carried him to his two most important individual triumphs at the 1987 World Cup qualifier at Olympia, where he won a Volvo car, and the 1990 British Jumping Derby at Hickstead. Turi would later return to Hungary represented his native country in the 2000 Olympics. It was near his home in Nagykoros on Easter Sunday 2003 that he sustained fatal injuries in a motor bike accident. He died 11 days later in a Hungarian hospital.
