= Walter Gabathuler =

Swiss equestrian

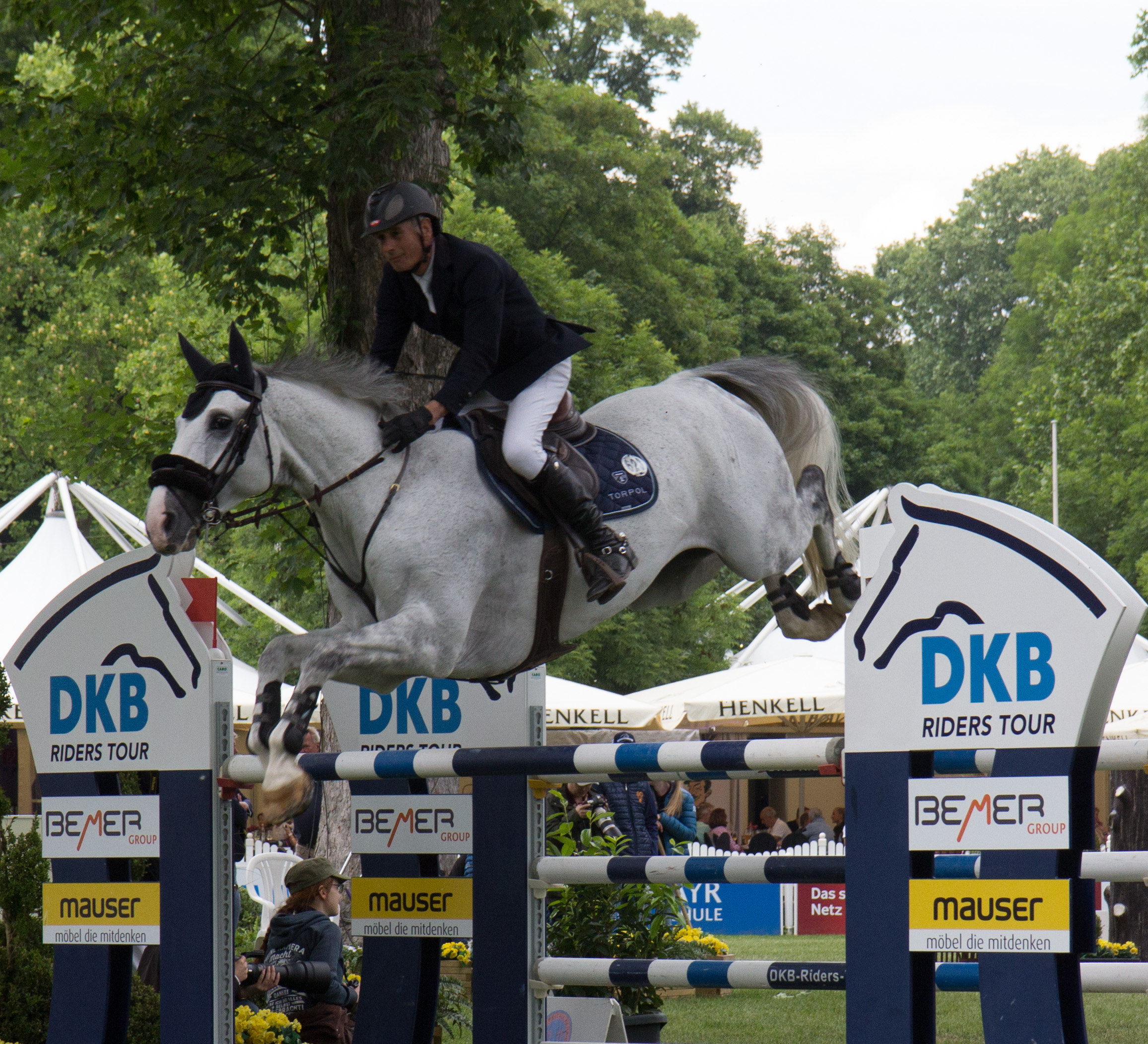
- Walter Gabathuler in 2018

Personal information
- Nationality: Swiss
- Born: 20 June 1954 (age 70)

Sport
- Sport: Equestrian

Walter Gabathuler (born 20 June 1954) is a Swiss equestrian. He competed in two events at the 1988 Summer Olympics.
