= Christina Johannpeter =

Brazilian equestrian

Personal information
- Born: 24 February 1956 (age 69); Rio de Janeiro, Brazil

Sport
- Sport: Equestrian

Christina Johannpeter (born 24 February 1956) is a Brazilian equestrian. She competed in two events at the 1988 Summer Olympics.
