= Karsten Huck =

German equestrian (born 1945)

Personal information
- Born: 13 November 1945 (age 80) Wohltorf, Germany
Medal record
Equestrian
Representing West Germany
Olympic Games
Bronze medal – third place	1988 Seoul	Individual jumping
World Championships
Silver medal – second place	1990 Stockholm	Team jumping

Karsten Huck (born 13 November 1945) is a German equestrian and Olympic medalist. He was born in Wohltorf. He won a bronze medal in show jumping at the 1988 Summer Olympics in Seoul.

== Biography ==
Huck was born the son of competition rider Hans-Jürgen Huck. He started vaulting at the Flensburg-Mürwik Riding and Driving School at the age of ten and then began riding. After graduating from high school in 1965, he did his military service until 1967, trained as a bank clerk and studied business administration in Hamburg, graduating in 1974 with a degree in business administration. He worked as the managing director of a Hamburg-based housing management company until 1977. In 1979, he decided to become a riding instructor and became a master of equine management with a focus on riding. Huck runs a competition and training business in Schleswig-Holstein.

In April 1988, he married Brigitte Horn, who was also a successful competition rider in equestrian sport. They have two children together. His sister Melitta's son is the German dressage rider Matthias Alexander Rath.
