= Urbano Zea (swimmer) =

Mexican swimmer

Urbano Zea Raynal
Personal information
- Born: 31 January 1969 Ciudad Juárez, Chihuahua, Mexico
- Died: 6 April 2018 (aged 49) Miami, Florida, United States

Sport
- Sport: Swimming
- Strokes: Freestyle, Butterfly
- Club: EPAP, Mission Viejo Nadadores, Mexico Olympic Swim Team
- College team: UNM Lobos

Urbano Zea (31 January 1969 – 6 April 2018) was a Mexican freestyle and butterfly swimmer. He competed in four events at the 1988 Summer Olympics. He died in Miami, Florida on 6 April 2018 from a heart attack.
