= Nam Gwan-U =

South Korean equestrian

Personal information
- Nationality: South Korean
- Born: 23 October 1955 (age 69)

Sport
- Sport: Equestrian

Nam Gwan-U (Korean: 남관우, also transliterated Nam Kwan-Woo, born 23 October 1955) is a South Korean equestrian. He competed in two events at the 1988 Summer Olympics.
