= Juan García (equestrian) =

Spanish equestrian

Personal information
- Nationality: Spanish
- Born: 30 March 1965 (age 59)

Sport
- Sport: Equestrian

Juan García (born 30 March 1965) is a Spanish equestrian. He competed in two events at the 1988 Summer Olympics.
