= Takao Sawai =

Japanese equestrian

Personal information
- Nationality: Japanese
- Born: 21 September 1940 (age 84)

Sport
- Sport: Equestrian

Takao Sawai (born 21 September 1940) is a Japanese equestrian. He competed in two events at the 1988 Summer Olympics.
