= Everardo Hegewisch =

Mexican equestrian

Personal information
- Nationality: Mexican
- Born: 23 July 1961 (age 63)

Sport
- Sport: Equestrian

Everardo Hegewisch (born 23 July 1961) is a Mexican equestrian. He competed in the team jumping event at the 1988 Summer Olympics.
