= Maurice Beatson =

New Zealand equestrian

Personal information
- Full name: Maurice George Beatson
- Born: 27 August 1953 (age 71); Hastings, New Zealand

Sport
- Country: New Zealand
- Sport: Equestrian

Maurice George Beatson (born 27 August 1953) is a New Zealand equestrian. He competed in two events at the 1988 Summer Olympics.

In 2024, Beatson was inducted into the Equestrian Sports New Zealand Hall of Fame.
