= Gabriel Cano (cyclist) =

Mexican cyclist

Personal information
- Born: 23 May 1965 (age 61)

Cycling career
- Sport: Cycling

Gabriel Cano (born 23 May 1965) is a Mexican former cyclist. He competed in two events at the 1988 Summer Olympics.
