= Frédéric Cottier =

French equestrian (born 1954)

Medal record

Equestrian

Representing France

Olympic Games
Bronze medal – third place	1988 Seoul	Team jumping

Frédéric Cottier (born 5 February 1954) is a French equestrian and Olympic medalist. He was born in Neuilly-sur-Seine. He won a bronze medal in show jumping at the 1988 Summer Olympics in Seoul.
