= Jorge Alarcón (swimmer) =

Mexican swimmer (born 1969)

Personal information
- Born: 17 January 1969 (age 57)

Sport
- Sport: Swimming

Jorge Alarcón (born 17 January 1969) is a Mexican swimmer. He competed in two events at the 1988 Summer Olympics.
