= Anatoly Timoshenko =

Soviet equestrian

Personal information
- Nationality: Soviet
- Born: 11 September 1956 (age 69)

Sport
- Sport: Equestrian

Anatoly Timoshenko (Russian: Анатолий Тимошенко, born 11 September 1956) is a Soviet equestrian. He competed at the 1988 Summer Olympics and the 1992 Summer Olympics.
