= Gerry Mullins (equestrian) =

Irish equestrian

Personal information
- Nationality: Irish
- Born: 29 December 1953 (age 71)

Sport
- Sport: Equestrian

Gerry Mullins (born 29 December 1953) is an Irish equestrian. He competed at the 1984 Summer Olympics and the 1988 Summer Olympics.
