= Hubert Bourdy =

French equestrian (1957–2014)

Medal record

Equestrian

Representing France

Olympic Games
Bronze medal – third place	1988 Seoul	Team jumping
Bronze medal – third place	1992 Barcelona	Team jumping

Mediterranean Games
Gold medal – first place	1983 Casablanca	Individual jumping
Silver medal – second place	1983 Casablanca	Team jumping

Hubert Bourdy (5 March 1957 – 25 June 2014) was a French equestrian and Olympic medalist. He was born in Troyes. He won a bronze medal in show jumping at the 1988 Summer Olympics in Seoul.
