= Wolfgang Brinkmann =

German equestrian (born 1950)

Personal information
- Born: 23 May 1950 (age 76) Bielefeld, North Rhine-Westphalia, West Germany
- Height: 1.78 m (5 ft 10 in)
- Weight: 79 kg (174 lb)

Sport
- Sport: Equestrianism
- Club: RV von Lützow, Herford
Medal record
Representing West Germany
Olympic Games
Gold medal – first place	1988 Seoul	Team jumping

Wolfgang Brinkmann (born 23 May 1950) is a retired German equestrian. He won a gold medal in show jumping with the West German team at the 1988 Summer Olympics and finished in 19th place individually.

== Personal life ==
Brinkmann was born in Bielefeld, North Rhine-Westphalia, on 23 May 1950.
