= Dirk Hafemeister =

German equestrian

Medal record

Equestrian

Representing West Germany

Olympic Games
Gold medal – first place	1988 Seoul	Team jumping

Dirk Hafemeister (17 April 1958 – 31 August 2017) was a German equestrian and Olympic champion. He won a gold medal in show jumping with the West German team at the 1988 Summer Olympics in Seoul.
