= Thomas Fuchs (equestrian) =

Swiss equestrian

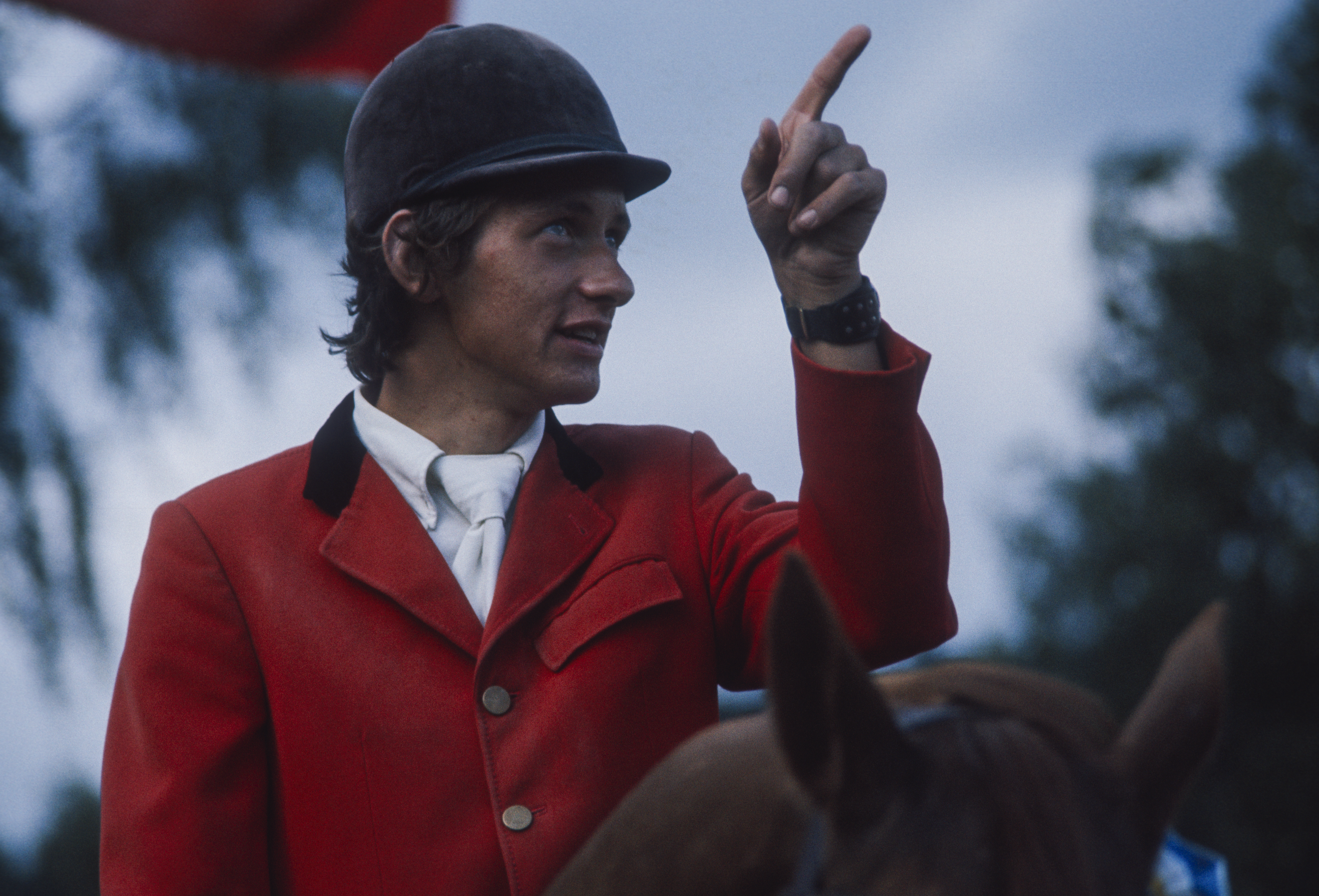

Personal information
- Nationality: Swiss
- Born: 10 November 1957 (age 67); Zürich, Switzerland

Sport
- Sport: Equestrian

Thomas Fuchs (born 10 November 1957) is a Swiss equestrian. He competed at the 1988 Summer Olympics and the 1992 Summer Olympics.
