= Philippe Guerdat =

Swiss equestrian

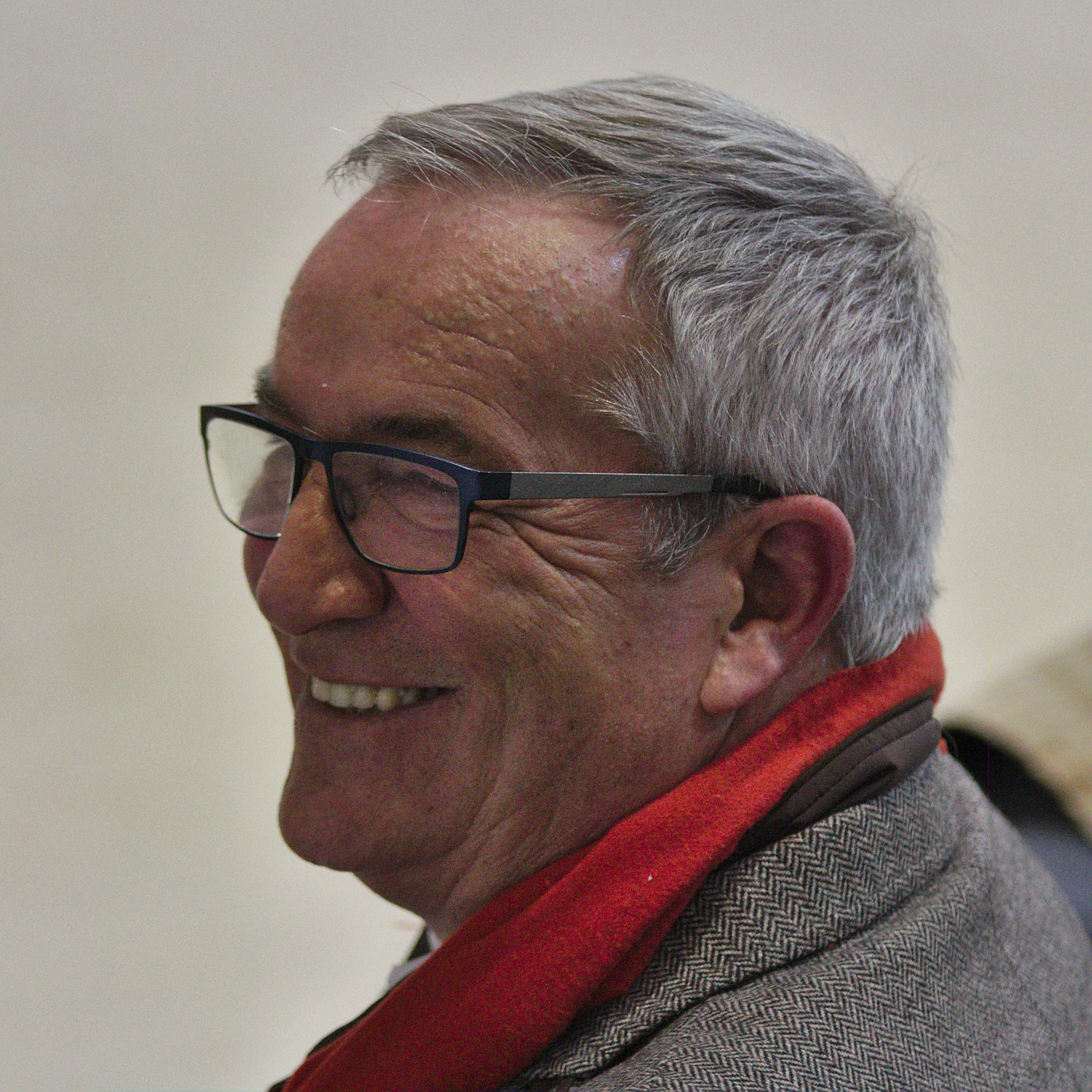
- Philippe Guerdat in 2014

Personal information
- Nationality: Swiss
- Born: 21 April 1952 (age 72); Bassecourt, Switzerland

Sport
- Sport: Equestrian

Philippe Guerdat (born 21 April 1952) is a Swiss former equestrian. He competed at the 1984 Summer Olympics and the 1988 Summer Olympics.
