= Lisa Ann Jacquin =

American equestrian

Personal information
- Born: February 22, 1962 (age 64) Tucson, Arizona, U.S.
Medal record
Equestrian
Representing the United States
Olympic Games
Silver medal – second place	1988 Seoul	Team jumping
Pan American Games
Silver medal – second place	1987 Indianapolis	Team jumping

Lisa Ann Jacquin (born February 22, 1962) is an American equestrian and Olympic medalist. She was born in Tucson, Arizona. She won a silver medal in show jumping at the 1988 Summer Olympics in Seoul.
