= Raimundas Udrakis =

Soviet equestrian (born 1965)

Personal information
- Born: March 31, 1965 Žagarė, Lithuanian SSR, Soviet Union

Sport
- Sport: Equestrian

Raimundas Udrakis (born 31 March 1965) is a Lithuanian-Soviet Olympic equestrian. He competed in the individual and team show jumping events at the 1988 Summer Olympics.
