= Alberto Rivera (equestrian) =

Mexican equestrian (born 1954)

Personal information
- Nationality: Mexican
- Born: 19 September 1954 (age 72)

Sport
- Sport: Equestrian
Medal record
Equestrian
Representing Mexico
Pan American Games
Bronze medal – third place	1983 Caracas	Team jumping
Bronze medal – third place	1987 Indianapolis	Team jumping

Alberto Rivera (born 19 September 1954) is a Mexican equestrian. He competed in two events at the 1988 Summer Olympics.
