= American Grandprix Association =

- Formation: 1978
- Purpose: Promote Olympic-level show jumping in the United States
- Region served: United States
- Key people: Eugene R. Mische; founder

The American Grandprix Association (AGA) is a national association that promotes Olympic-level show jumping in the United States.

The AGA was established in 1978 by Eugene R. Mische. Leonard King was the AGA's president from 1978 through 1999.

As of 2004, it ran 33 show jumping events in 20 states, with $3 million in prize money.

The AGA awards an annual Rider of the Year award based on points, and annual Rookie of the Year and Horse of the Year awards based on money. Margie Goldstein-Engel is the AGA's only ten-time Rider of the Year (1989, 1991, 1994, 1995, 1996, 1999/2000, 2000/2001, 2003, 2005, 2006).
