= Equestrian events at the 1988 Summer Olympics =

Equestrian at the Games of the XXIV Olympiad
- Venue: Seoul Race Park; Seoul Olympic Stadium; Goyang Ranch
- Dates: 19 September – 2 October 1988
- No. of events: 6
- Competitors: 182 from 32 nations

The equestrian events at the 1988 Seoul Olympics included dressage, eventing, and show jumping. All three disciplines had both individual and team competitions.

== Medal summary ==
Games	Gold	Silver	Bronze
Individual dressage	Nicole Uphoff on Rembrandt; West Germany	Margit Otto-Crépin on Corlandus; France	Christine Stückelberger on Gauguin de Lully CH; Switzerland
Team dressage	West Germany; Reiner Klimke and Ahlerich; Ann-Kathrin Linsenhoff and Courage; Monica Theodorescu and Ganimedes; Nicole Uphoff and Rembrandt	Switzerland; Otto Hofer and Andiamo; Christine Stückelberger and Gauguin de Lully CH; Daniel Ramseier and Random; Samuel Schatzmann and Rochus	Canada; Cynthia Neale-Ishoy and Dynasty; Eva Maria Pracht and Emirage; Gina Smith and Malte; Ashley Nicoll and Reipo
Individual eventing	Mark Todd and Charisma; New Zealand	Ian Stark and Sir Wattie; Great Britain	Virginia Leng and Master Craftsman; Great Britain
Team eventing	West Germany; Claus Erhorn and Justyn Thyme; Matthias Baumann and Shamrock 11; Thies Kaspareit and Sherry 42; Ralf Ehrenbrink and Uncle Todd	Great Britain; Captain Mark Phillips and Cartier; Karen Straker and Get Smart; Virginia Leng and Master Craftsman; Ian Stark and Sir Wattie	New Zealand; Mark Todd and Charisma; Margaret Knighton and Enterprise; Andrew Bennie and Grayshott; Tinks Pottinger and Volunteer
Individual jumping	Pierre Durand, Jr. and Jappeloup; France	Greg Best and Gem Twist; United States	Karsten Huck and Nepomuk 8 West Germany
Team jumping	West Germany; Ludger Beerbaum and The Freak; Wolfgang Brinkmann and Pedro; Dirk Hafemeister and Orchidee 76; Franke Sloothaak and Walzerkonig 19	United States; Greg Best and Gem Twist; Lisa Ann Jacquin and For the Moment; Anne Kursinski and Starman; Joseph Fargis and Mill Pearl	France; Hubert Bourdy and Morgat; Frédéric Cottier and Flambeau C Michel Robert and La Fayette; Pierre Durand, Jr. and Jappeloup

== Medals ==
Rank	Nation	Gold	Silver	Bronze	Total
1	West Germany	4	0	1	5
2	France	1	1	1	3
3	New Zealand	1	0	1	2
4	Great Britain	0	2	1	3
5	United States	0	2	0	2
6	Switzerland	0	1	1	2
7	Canada	0	0	1	1
Totals (7 entries)		6	6	6	18

== Officials ==
Appointment of officials was as follows:

Dressage

- (Switzerland) Wolfgang Niggli (Ground Jury President)
- (New Zealand) Nicholas Williams (Ground Jury Member)
- (West Germany) Heinz Schütte (Ground Jury Member)
- (Soviet Union) Elena Kondratieva (Ground Jury Member)
- (United States) Donald Thackeray (Ground Jury Member)

Jumping

- (Denmark) Knud Larsen (Ground Jury President)
- (Switzerland) Hans Britschgi (Ground Jury Member)
- (Netherlands) Jaap Rijks (Ground Jury Member)
- (South Korea) Johnson Kim (Ground Jury Member)
- (West Germany) Olaf Petersen (Course Designer)
- (United Kingdom) Pamela Carruthers (Technical Delegate)

Eventing

- (West Germany) Bernd Springorum (Ground Jury President)
- (Switzerland) Anton Bühler (Ground Jury Member)
- (France) François Lucas (Ground Jury Member)
- (United Kingdom) Hugh Thomas (Course Designer)
- (Canada) Ewen B. Graham (Technical Delegate)
