= Equestrian at the 1984 Summer Olympics – Individual jumping =

Equestrian at the Olympics

Individual jumping at the Games of the XXIII Olympiad
- Equestrian pictogram
- Venue: Santa Anita Racetrack
- Date: 12 August
- Competitors: 51 from 21 nations
- Winning total: 4.00 faults

Medalists
1st place, gold medalist(s)		Joseph Fargis; United States
2nd place, silver medalist(s)		Conrad Homfeld; United States
3rd place, bronze medalist(s)		Heidi Robbiani; Switzerland

The individual show jumping at the 1984 Summer Olympics took place on 12 August at the Santa Anita Racetrack. The event was open to both men and women. There were 51 competitors from 21 nations. The event was won by Joseph Fargis of the United States, the nation's first victory in individual jumping since 1968 and second overall, third-most all-time behind France and Italy with 3. His teammate Conrad Homfeld earned silver. Heidi Robbiani earned Switzerland's first medal in the event since 1928 with her bronze.

== Background ==
This was the 17th appearance of the event, which had first been held at the 1900 Summer Olympics and has been held at every Summer Olympics at which equestrian sports have been featured (that is, excluding 1896, 1904, and 1908). It is the oldest event on the current programme, the only one that was held in 1900. The team and individual events remained separated, as they had been starting in 1968.

Due to the American-led boycott in 1980 and the Soviet-led boycott in 1984, only fourth-place finisher Oswaldo Méndez of Guatemala returned from the 1980 Games. Unlike Moscow 1980, the 1984 Games were unaffected, since all of the top riders were from the Western nations. The favorite was 1982 World Cup winner Melanie Smith, leading an unusually strong American team.

No nations made their debut in the event. France competed for the 15th time, most of any nation.

== Competition format ==
The competition used the two-round format introduced in 1952. The elimination feature added in 1968 returned after not being used in 1980 due to a small field; the number of riders advancing from the first round to the second was increased to 25 from 20 (the number of advancing riders in 1972 and 1976). Both rounds were combined to determine placement. Ties for medal positions would be broken through a jump-off.

== Schedule ==
All times are Pacific Daylight Time (UTC-7)

Date	Time	Round
Sunday, 12 August 1984	7:00	Round 1 Round 2

== Results ==
Rank	Rider	Horse	Nation	Round 1	Round 2	Total	Jump-off
1st place, gold medalist(s)	Joseph Fargis	Touch of Class	United States	0.00	4.00	4.00	0.00
2nd place, silver medalist(s)	Conrad Homfeld	Abdullah	United States	4.00	0.00	4.00	8.00
3rd place, bronze medalist(s)	Heidi Robbiani	Jessica V	Switzerland	4.00	4.00	8.00	0.00
4	Mario Deslauriers	Aramis	Canada	4.00	4.00	8.00	4.00
5	Bruno Candrian	Slygof	Switzerland	4.00	4.00	8.00	8.00
6	Luis Álvarez de Cervera	Jexico de Park	Spain	4.25	4.25	8.50	—N/a
7	Frédéric Cottier	Flambeau C	France	8.00	4.00	12.00	—N/a
7	Paul Schockemöhle	Deister	West Germany	8.00	4.00	12.00	—N/a
7	Melanie Smith	Calypso	United States	4.00	8.00	12.00	—N/a
10	Luis Astolfi	Feinschnitt "Z"	Spain	5.25	8.50	13.75	—N/a
11	Peter Luther	Livius	West Germany	12.00	4.00	16.00	—N/a
11	Franke Sloothaak	Farmer	West Germany	8.00	8.00	16.00	—N/a
13	Tim Grubb	Linky	Great Britain	8.25	9.00	16.25	—N/a
14	John Whitaker	Ryans Son	Great Britain	12.00	8.00	20.00	—N/a
14	Gerardo Tazzer	Magod	Mexico	12.00	8.00	20.00	—N/a
14	Ian Millar	Big Ben	Canada	12.00	8.00	20.00	—N/a
14	Pierre Durand Jr.	Jappeloup	France	12.00	8.00	20.00	—N/a
18	Fernando Senderos	Masacre	Mexico	12.75	8.00	20.75	—N/a
19	Hugh Graham	Elrond	Canada	13.00	8.00	21.00	—N/a
20	Philippe Rozier	Jiva	France	16.00	8.00	24.00	—N/a
20	Giorgio Nuti	Impedoumi	Italy	12.00	12.00	24.00	—N/a
22	Bruno Scolari	Joyaud'or	Italy	16.00	12.00	28.00	—N/a
22	Hugo Simon	The Freak	Austria	12.00	16.00	28.00	—N/a
24	Michael Whitaker	Overton Amanda	Great Britain	0.00	28.50	28.50	—N/a
25	Herman Van Den Broeck	Wellington	Belgium	16.00	16.25	32.25	—N/a
26	Jeff McVean	King Omega	Australia	12.50	24.25	36.75	—N/a
27	Shuichi Toki	The Shinto	Japan	10.50	Elim.		—N/a
28	Gerry Mullins	Ruckbarton	Ireland	16.25	Did not advance		—N/a
29	Ove Hansen	Sancerre	Norway	16.50	Did not advance		—N/a
29	Greg Eurell	Mr. Shrimpton	Australia	16.50	Did not advance		—N/a
31	Jaime Azcárraga	Royal Today	Mexico	18.00	Did not advance		—N/a
32	Jorge Carneiro	Testarudo	Brazil	21.25	Did not advance		—N/a
33	Caio Sérgio de Carvalho	Virtuoso	Brazil	23.25	Did not advance		—N/a
34	Yoshihiro Nakano	Colman	Japan	24.00	Did not advance		—N/a
35	Alfredo Sone	Trumao	Chile	24.25	Did not advance		—N/a
36	George Sanna	Kite	Australia	24.50	Did not advance		—N/a
36	Graziano Mancinelli	Ideal de la Haye	Italy	24.50	Did not advance		—N/a
38	Willi Melliger	Van Gogh	Switzerland	24.75	Did not advance		—N/a
39	Peter Eriksson	Imperator	Sweden	25.75	Did not advance		—N/a
40	Justo Albarracín	Collon Cura de Tatu	Argentina	26.50	Did not advance		—N/a
41	Alberto Honrubia	Kaoua	Spain	27.00	Did not advance		—N/a
42	Américo Simonetti	Amaranto	Chile	28.25	Did not advance		—N/a
42	Ferdi Tyteca	't Soulaiky	Belgium	28.25	Did not advance		—N/a
44	Victor Contador	Tostao	Chile	40.00	Did not advance		—N/a
45	Marcelo Blessman	Alpes	Brazil	44.00	Did not advance		—N/a
46	Takashi Tomura	Purplex	Japan	48.25	Did not advance		—N/a
46	Eduardo Zone	Cardal	Argentina	48.25	Did not advance		—N/a
—	Martín Mallo	Gonzo	Argentina	DNF	Did not advance		—N/a
—	Axel Verlooy	Vrijheid	Belgium	DNF	Did not advance		—N/a
—	Oswaldo Méndez	Love Forever	Guatemala	Elim.	Did not advance		—N/a
—	John Cottle	Arturo	New Zealand	Elim.	Did not advance		—N/a
