= Equestrian at the 1984 Summer Olympics – Team jumping =

Team jumping at the Games of the XXIII Olympiad
- Venue: Santa Anita Racetrack
- Date: 7 August
- Competitors: 59 from 15 nations

Medalists
1st place, gold medalist(s)		Joseph Fargis; Conrad Homfeld; Leslie Howard; Melanie Smith	United States
2nd place, silver medalist(s)		Michael Whitaker; John Whitaker; Steven Smith; Timothy Grubb	Great Britain
3rd place, bronze medalist(s)		Paul Schockemöhle; Peter Luther; Franke Sloothaak; Fritz Ligges	West Germany

The team jumping at the 1984 Summer Olympics took place on 7 August at the Santa Anita Racetrack.

== Results ==
Rank	Name	Nation	Round 1	Round 2	Total
1st place, gold medalist(s)	Joseph Fargis; Conrad Homfeld; Leslie Howard; Melanie Smith	United States	4.00	8.00	12.00
2nd place, silver medalist(s)	Michael Whitaker; John Whitaker; Steven Smith; Timothy Grubb	Great Britain	24.00	12.75	36.75
3rd place, bronze medalist(s)	Paul Schockemöhle; Peter Luther; Franke Sloothaak; Fritz Ligges	West Germany	20.00	19.25	39.25
4	Ian Millar; Hugh Graham; Jim Elder; Mario Deslauriers	Canada	24.00	16.00	40.00
5	Heidi Robbiani; Bruno Candrian; Willi Melliger; Philippe Guerdat	Switzerland	24.00	17.00	41.00
6	Frédéric Cottier; Éric Navet; Philippe Rozier; Pierre Durand Jr.	France	25.75	24.00	49.75
7	Alberto Honrubia; Luis Álvarez; Rutherford Latham; Luis Astolfi	Spain	21.50	30.50	52.00
8	Giorgio Nuti; Graziano Mancinelli; Bruno Scolari; Filippo Moyersoen	Italy	59.25	16.00	75.25
9	Greg Eurell; George Sanna; Jeff McVean; Guy Creighton	Australia	56.00	36.00	92.00
10	Jorge Carneiro; Caio Sérgio Caio; Marcelo Blessman; Vitor Teixeira	Brazil	66.50	67.00	133.50
11	Shuichi Toki; Takashi Tomura; Yoshihiro Nakano; Ryuichi Obata	Japan	53.50	83.75	137.25
12	Fernando Senderos; Raúl Nieto; Gerardo Tazzer; Federico Garza	Mexico	52.75	EL	Did not finish
13	Herman Van Den Broeck; Ferdi Tyteca; Axel Verlooy	Belgium	80.25	did not advance	
14	Américo Simonetti; Alfredo Sone; Victor Contador; Alfonso Bobadilla	Chile	80.50	did not advance	
15	Justo Albarracín; Eduardo Zone; Martín Mallo; Adrián Melosi	Argentina	89.75	did not advance	
