= 1984 Summer Olympics closing ceremony =

- Part of 1984 Summer Olympics
- Date: August 12, 1984
- Time: 20:00-22:20 PDT (UTC–7)
- Venue: Los Angeles Memorial Coliseum
- Location: Los Angeles, California, United States; 34°0′51″N 118°17′16″W
- Also known as: Closing Ceremonies: A Celebration
- Filmed by: ABC Sports
- Participants: 100,000
- Footage: The ceremony on the IOC YouTube channel

The closing ceremony of the 1984 Summer Olympics took place at the Los Angeles Memorial Coliseum in Los Angeles, California on Sunday, August 12, 1984, at 20:00 PDT.

== Preparation and pre-ceremony ==
The 23,000 square foot stage on center pitch, about a third of the size of the field, cost $500,000 ($1.2 million in 2020). Constructed in four weeks, it arrived and was installed in 12 hours by 300 workers. One ring of the lower level served as a pit for the 60-member Los Angeles Olympic Symphony Orchestra, while the three other rings were filled with water 6 feet (1.8 m) deep.

The ceremony was directed by David Wolper and Tommy Walker. They also hired producer Daniel Flannery and his production company. Flannery was the conceptualist working directly with Wolper and Walker. Once the ceremonies were conceived, the Los Angeles Olympic Organizing Committee (LAOOC) contracted Flannery to produce them and his firm to supervise the special effects and special lighting of the ceremony. This included designing the famous spaceship and alien sequence. Flashlights were given to all 92,000 attendees, with three interchangeable colors: red, white and blue. The Coliseum announcer was Charles Corsen.

Before the start of the ceremonies, in an interview during the ABC broadcast, International Olympic Committee President Juan Antonio Samaranch declared to journalist Peter Jennings that the games scored a "10" out of 10.

=== Victory ceremonies ===
Per tradition, the final medal ceremonies of the Games took place at the main Olympic stadium during the closing festivities. The medals were presented by Juan Antonio Samaranch, IOC President, accompanied by Primo Nebiolo, IAAF President. The final victory ceremony was held in honor of the three marathon medalists:

Carlos Lopes – Gold
John Treacy – Silver
Charles Spedding – Bronze

The marathon began at 5:00 pm, before the start of the ceremony, and the finish line was the Coliseum. Some runners staggered in with cheers from the crowd. After the last athletes crossed the finish line, marathon winners were awarded their medals, with Portugal's Carlos Lopes being awarded the gold. His national anthem was played.

After the men's marathon medals were presented, the final victory ceremony was held to the three individual jumping medalists in equestrian, with the medals awarded by Lord Killanin, Honorary Lifetime IOC President, accompanied by Fritz O. Widmer, Secretary General of the International Equestrian Federation.

Individual jumping medalists:

Joe Fargis – Gold
Conrad Homfeld – Silver
Heidi Robbiani – Bronze

Traditionally, the final individual jumping equestrian event is also held at the Olympic stadium on the morning of the day of the closing ceremony. However, in 1984 the event was staged the day before at the same venue, so as not to damage the Coliseum field or turning any preparation for the massive closing ceremony extravanganza late. Instead, the three medal winners rode in on horseback and paraded at the Coliseum track to the medal podium during the pre-ceremony. After the U.S. anthem was played for gold medal winner Joseph Fargis, they took a victory lap again on horseback around the Coliseum, to cheers from the crowd.

== Ceremony ==
As in the opening ceremony, city church bells rang to commence the start of the ceremony.

=== Parade of Nations ===
In previous Olympic Games, only six athletes from each country's delegation were allowed to attend the closing ceremony. In 1984, for the first time ever, the Organizing Committee allowed all athletes wishing to attend to do so, resulting in over 6,000 athletes marching into the stadium. The 1984 "Olympic Fanfare and Theme", composed by John Williams, was performed in the Coliseum peristyle by the 750-member Olympic All American Marching Band. Other songs were performed while the flag bearers, country name placards and, finally, the athletes of 140 nations marched en masse.

=== Anthems and Antwerp Ceremony ===
The national anthems of Greece (by tradition), the United States (the host nation) and then South Korea (the next host country) were played. On center stage, Los Angeles mayor Tom Bradley was joined by IOC president Juan Antonio Samaranch and the mayor of Seoul, South Korea, Yeom Bo-hyeon, for the Antwerp flag transfer, which was passed from Bradley to Samaranch to Bo-hyeon. The Seoul mayor then left the main stage with the flag. American children of different races gifted Korean children silver Olympic coins and in exchange the Korean children gifted the American children traditional Korean jewelry boxes. Ludwig van Beethoven's "Ode to Joy" was then performed by the symphony.

A delegation from Seoul, the 1988 Summer Olympics host, performed a traditional Buchaechum choreography. The dance was performed by the Seoul City Dance Theater, who were joined by the 1986 Asian Games and 1988 Summer Olympics mascot Hodori, the Asian tiger. The Dance Theater of Harlem then performed the Stars and Stripes ballet by George Balanchine to reciprocate.

=== Speeches and closing declaration ===
LAOOC president Peter Ueberroth delivered a speech, and IOC president Samaranch delivered a speech in English, awarding the Olympic Order in Gold to Ueberroth. Samaranch then declared the Games of the XXIII Olympiad in Los Angeles closed and, in accordance with tradition, called upon the youth of the world to assemble four years from now in Seoul to celebrate the Games of the XXIV Olympiad. The Olympic flag was lowered by selected citizens of Los Angeles, while the Olympic Hymn was performed and sung by the symphony. Four loud firework booms sounded and trumpeters appeared above the cauldron. Actor Richard Basehart read from the Greek lyric poet Pindar's Ode to Olympians. As Basehart read the last refrain, the Olympic flame was then extinguished.

=== Entertainment ===
During the start of the entertainment section, the Coliseum announcers informed the audience to set their flashlights to blue and turn them on at the count of three. As the blue lights came on, the symphony played the introduction ("Einleitung") of Thus Spoke Zarathustra by Richard Strauss. A flying UFO then appeared above the stadium. The stage lit up and "spoke" to the spaceship with lights in dueling form, using a sequence of notes from the "Olympic Fanfare and Theme", similar to the ending of the 1977 film Close Encounters of the Third Kind. The Coliseum arches glowed and the peristyle lit up from behind and simulated the spaceship landing. A laser show within the Coliseum commenced. At the end, a 7-foot tall "alien" appeared above the parapet of the cauldron and announced that the city and humanity had kept "the ideals of the Olympics", declaring, "I salute you".

=== Fireworks show ===
The fireworks show was a salute to every Olympic city. Each city was announced to the audience, followed by a quick anecdote, and each city's national folk music was played by the symphony to accompany the display.

Examples of music:

Paris – "Galop infernal" (the can-can)
Berlin – "Ride of the Valkyries"
London – "The River Kwai March"
Melbourne – "Waltzing Matilda"
Mexico City – "Granada"
Los Angeles – "The Stars and Stripes Forever"

=== Concert section ===
Lionel Richie performed an extended version of his No. 1 hit song "All Night Long", accompanied by breakdancers. Confetti rained on the stadium with large scale balloons. Athletes remained on the field and danced as American pop music played. A large display of fireworks followed and ended the show along with a rendition by all the musical performers and farewell musical song "Auld Lang Syne". The ceremony officially concluded at 00:00 PDT.

== Attendees ==
=== Dignitaries from International Organizations ===
- International Olympic Committee –
  - IOC President Juan Antonio Samaranch
  - Members of the International Olympic Committee
  - IOC Honorary President for Life Lord Killanin

=== Host Country Dignitaries ===
- United States –
  - President of the Los Angeles Olympic Organizing Committee Peter Ueberroth
  - Vice President George H. W. Bush
  - Governor of California George Deukmejian
  - Mayor of Los Angeles Tom Bradley
  - Actors Henry Winkler, Cary Grant, Kurt Russell, Goldie Hawn and Dustin Hoffman

=== Foreign Dignitaries ===
- United Kingdom –
  - Prince Philip, Duke of Edinburgh
- Canada –
  - Prime Minister of Canada John Turner
- South Korea –
  - Prime Minister of South Korea Chin Lee-Chong
  - Mayor of Seoul Yeom Bo-hyeon

== Anthems ==
All anthems were performed by the Olympic All-American Marching Band.

- National Anthem of Greece
- National Anthem of the United States of America (Note: Anthem played as part of the Individual jumping victory ceremony.)
- National Anthem of South Korea
- (International Olympic Committee) Olympic Hymn
- National Anthem of Portugal (Note: Anthem played as part of the Men's marathon victory ceremony.)
