= Rozier =

Rozier may refer to:

== People ==
=== France ===
- Clara Rozier (born 1997), French ice hockey player
- François Rozier (1734–1793), French botanist and agronomist
- Guillaume Rozier (born 1996), French engineer
- Jacques Rozier (1926–2023), French film director and screenwriter
- Janine Rozier (born 1938), former member of the Senate of France
- Jean Ferdinand Rozier (1777–1864), French-American businessman
- Jean-François Pilâtre de Rozier (1754–1785), French chemistry and physics teacher, and one of the first pioneers of aviation
- Joseph Rozier (died 1994), bishop of Poitiers
- Marcel Rozier (born 1936), equestrian from France and Olympic champion
- Philippe Rozier (born 1963), French show jumping rider
- Thierry Rozier (born 1964), French show jumping rider
- William Rozier (1908–1983), French swimmer
- Willy Rozier (1901–1983), French actor, film director, film producer and screenwriter

=== United States ===
- Alex Rozier, American journalist
- Clifford Rozier (1972–2018), American professional basketball player
- George Rozier (1902–1984), American Republican politician and lawyer
- J. A. D. Rozier (fl. 1860s), 30th mayor of New Orleans
- Kimber Rozier (born 1989), American rugby union player
- Kristin Yvonne Rozier, American aerospace engineer and computer scientist
- Mike Rozier (born 1961), American former professional football player
- Robert Rozier (born 1955), American murderer and former defensive end
- Terry Rozier (born 1994), American professional basketball player

== Places ==
- Rozier Glacier, on the west coast of Graham Land, Antarctica

=== France ===
- Le Rozier, a commune in the Lozère department
- Rozier-Côtes-d'Aurec, a commune in the Loire department
- Rozier-en-Donzy, a commune in the Loire department
