= Bertalan de Némethy =

American equestrian (1911–2002)

Bertalan de Némethy (February 24, 1911 – January 16, 2002) was a cavalry officer in Hungary and later became the show jumping coach for the United States Equestrian Team. He was influential in developing riding and training methods used by show jumpers today.

== Biography ==
=== Years in Europe ===
De Némethy began riding as a child in Győr, Hungary, the son of a governor who controlled three of the 19 states. He began competing in show jumping in his teens. Due to his uncle's employment as a cavalry officer, de Némethy attended the Ludovica Military Academy, in Budapest, and graduated in 1932 with the rank of lieutenant. He then entered the cavalry, riding six horses each day at the school, beginning with dressage horses, before having a lesson on the longe without stirrups, and then riding young horses cross-country. In 1937 he became an instructor.

De Némethy's skill as a rider was exceptional, but he lost his opportunity for competition at the Olympics due to the cancellation of the 1940 Games. Instead, de Némethy was sent to train at the German cavalry school in Hanover, the first Hungarian officer to do so. There he was taught by the likes of Otto Lörke, Fritz Stecken, and Bubi Günther. He also learned the German system of training horses.

World War II forced de Némethy to return to Hungary, but as the Russian Army approached Budapest, he and his fellow cadets decided to flee yet again, this time, they went to Denmark. De Némethy remained in Copenhagen for six years, employed as a riding instructor.

=== Move to the United States ===
In 1952, the U. S. Embassy permitted de Némethy to immigrate and he became a citizen in 1958. He moved to Far Hills, New Jersey, and began teaching at Sleepy Hollow Country Club in Briarcliff Manor, New York. He later designed jumping courses for horse shows held in the region.

=== Coaching the US Show Jumping Team ===
In 1955, on the advice of William Steinkraus and Arthur McCashin, de Némethy was asked by the United States Equestrian Team to become the coach for the jumping team. De Némethy accepted the position, holding it until 1980. During this time he trained famous competitors in the sport, including George H. Morris, Joe Fargis, Frank Chapot, Kathy Kusner, Leslie Burr, Conrad Homfeld, Michael Matz, Melanie Smith, Bernie Traurig, Neal Shapiro, and William Steinkraus.

He based his training on dressage work, jumping grids, and longeing, all of which was published in his classic book The de Némethy Method. While he was their coach, the US Show Jumping Team won the team silver at the 1960 and 1972 Olympics, the 1968 individual gold, and the 1972 individual bronze. Additionally, all four riders on the 1984 gold medal-winning team had been trained by de Némethy.

His teams won the team gold medal at the Pan American Games in 1959, 1963, 1975, and 1979. His teams won 71 out of the 144 Nations Cups in which they competed, as well as the FEI President's Trophy in 1966 and 1968. His riders individually won 72 International Grand Prixs and more than 400 international classes.

After coaching the US Team, de Némethy was sought after as a course designer. He was inducted into the Show Jumping Hall of Fame in 1987.
