= Touch of Class (horse) =

Thoroughbred racehorse

- Breed: Thoroughbred
- Sire: Yankee Lad
- Grandsire: Rejected
- Dam: Kluwall
- Maternal grandsire: Cornwall
- Sex: Mare
- Foaled: 1973
- Died: July 1, 2001 (aged 28)
- Country: United States
- Colour: Bay

Touch of Class
Medal record

Equestrian

Representing the United States

Olympic Games
Gold medal – first place	1984 Los Angeles	Individual jumping
Gold medal – first place	1984 Los Angeles	Team jumping

Touch of Class was a bay American-bred Thoroughbred mare who was on United States Equestrian Team at the 1984 Summer Olympics, winning the gold medal in the individual and team show jumping events. She was ridden by Joseph Fargis.

== History ==
=== Pre-1984 Olympics ===
Touch of Class was foaled in on April 27, 1973, and was first registered as Stillaspill with the Jockey Club, having a brief racing career before being trained as a show-jumper. In 1981, in her first year at the Grand Prix level, she won classes at several shows, and in 1982 she qualified with Fargis for the USET's team for the World Championships in Dublin. When an injury took Fargis out of the saddle in 1982, Touch of Class was turned over to Conrad Homfeld, and the team won the Grand Prix at Southampton and came in 4th in the 1983 World Cup. With Fargis back in the saddle, Touch of Class was part of Nation's Cup teams that won in Rome and Calgary in 1983, and in later in her career she was also on Nation's Cup teams that won in Aachen, Washington and New York. In 1984, Touch of Class and Fargis won the Grand Prix of Tampa.

=== 1984 Olympics ===
Through consistent performances in Olympic trial events in 1984, Touch of Class and Fargis were named to the USET Olympic Show Jumping team, nicknamed the "Dream Team". Touch of Class posted the first double clear rounds in Olympic history, and cleared 90 out of 91 jumps, taking home two gold medals. In the jump-off, Touch of Class and Fargis competed against her former rider, Conrad Homfeld, who took home silver. She was the fourth horse in history to win two show-jumping gold medals, with the last being Hans Winkler's Halla in 1956. Her performance allowed her to be named the first non-human USOC Female Equestrian Athlete of the Year.

=== Post-1984 Olympics ===
Touch of Class continued to compete successfully throughout the 1980s, and took the top place in the World Cup U.S. East Coast League standings in both 1984 and 1985. She also had a successful breeding career. Touch of Class was inducted into the Show Jumping Hall of Fame in 2000, and she died at River Circle Farm in Franklin, Tennessee on July 1, 2001.

== Pedigree ==
Pedigree of Touch of Class
Sire Yankee Lad 1965	Rejected; 1950	Revoked; 1943	Blue Larkspur - 1926
Sire Yankee Lad 1965	Rejected; 1950	Revoked; 1943	Gala Belle - 1937
Sire Yankee Lad 1965	Rejected; 1950	By Line; 1940	Blenheim - 1927
Sire Yankee Lad 1965	Rejected; 1950	By Line; 1940	Sable Scarf - 1934
Sire Yankee Lad 1965	Tabarina; 1949	The Yuvaraj; 1943	Fairway - 1925
Sire Yankee Lad 1965	Tabarina; 1949	The Yuvaraj; 1943	Epona - 1937
Sire Yankee Lad 1965	Tabarina; 1949	Scotch Girl; 1943	Valerian - 1933
Sire Yankee Lad 1965	Tabarina; 1949	Scotch Girl; 1943	Scotch Hussy - 1937
Dam Kluwall 1966	Cornwall; 1947	Some Chance; 1939	Chance Play - 1923
Dam Kluwall 1966	Cornwall; 1947	Some Chance; 1939	Some Pomp - 1931
Dam Kluwall 1966	Cornwall; 1947	Corinne Dailey; 1932	Swift and Sure - 1923
Dam Kluwall 1966	Cornwall; 1947	Corinne Dailey; 1932	Headdress - 1927
Dam Kluwall 1966	Klutassen; 1950	Rustom Sirdar; 1942	Nearco - 1935
Dam Kluwall 1966	Klutassen; 1950	Rustom Sirdar; 1942	Mrs Rustom - 1931
Dam Kluwall 1966	Klutassen; 1950	Hilena; 1930	High Cloud - 1916
Dam Kluwall 1966	Klutassen; 1950	Hilena; 1930	Felina - 1920

== See also ==
- Equestrian at the Summer Olympics
- List of historical horses
