= Equestrian at the 2005 Mediterranean Games =

The equestrian competition at the 2005 Mediterranean Games was held in the Almería Equestrian Club in Almería, Spain.

== Men's competition ==
=== Individual Jumping ===
Rank	Final
1st place, gold medalist(s)	Roberto Airoldi (ITA)
2nd place, silver medalist(s)	Thierry Rozier (FRA)
3rd place, bronze medalist(s)	Karim El Zoghby (EGY)

=== Team Jumping ===
Rank	Final
1st place, gold medalist(s)	Filippo Moyersoen (ITA); Natale Chiaudani (ITA); Roberto Airoldi (ITA); Giovanni Magaton (ITA)
2nd place, silver medalist(s)	Patrice Delaveau (FRA); Olivier Guillon (FRA); Thierry Rozier (FRA); Simon Delestre (FRA)
3rd place, bronze medalist(s)	Álvaro Muñoz Escassi (ESP); Ricardo Jurado (ESP); Miguel Honrubia (ESP); Juan Riva (ESP)

== Medal table ==
Place	Nation	1st place, gold medalist(s)	2nd place, silver medalist(s)	3rd place, bronze medalist(s)	Total
1	Italy	2	0	0	1
2	France	0	2	0	2
3	Spain	0	0	1	1
3	Egypt	0	0	1	1
Total		2	2	2	6
