= Raúl Nieto =

Mexican equestrian (born 1961)

Personal information
- Nationality: Mexican
- Born: 7 April 1961 (age 65)

Sport
- Sport: Equestrian
Medal record
Equestrian
Representing Mexico
Pan American Games
Bronze medal – third place	1983 Caracas	Team jumping

Raúl Nieto (born 7 April 1961) is a Mexican equestrian. He competed in the team jumping event at the 1984 Summer Olympics.
