= Alfonso Bobadilla =

Chilean equestrian

Personal information
- Nationality: Chilean
- Born: 19 November 1951 (age 73)

Sport
- Sport: Equestrian

Alfonso Bobadilla Rojas (born 19 November 1951) is a Chilean equestrian, sport leader and former general of Carabineros de Chile. He competed in the team jumping event at the 1984 Summer Olympics.

After his retirement from competitive sports, Bobadilla made a career in the Carabineros de Chile until he reached the rank of general. At the same time, he performs various activities related to the Chilean rodeo, becoming the president of the Chilean Rodeo Federation in 2021.
