= Hugh Graham =

Hugh Graham may refer to:

- Hugh Graham, 1st Baron Atholstan (1848–1938), Canadian publisher
- Hugh Graham (figure skater), American figure skater
- Hugh Davis Graham (1936–2002), American historian and sociologist
- Hugh Graham (equestrian), Canadian show jumper
- Hugh Graham (politician), Jamaican politician
- Hugh Graham (sprinter), winner of the 2013 and 2014 NCAA Division I 4 × 100 m championships

== See also ==
- Hugh Mackay (footballer) (Hugh Graham Mackay, 1867–?), English footballer
