= Bernie Traurig =

American equestrian (born c. 1945)

Bernie Traurig (born c. 1945) is an American equestrian known for his international success in show jumping, dressage and eventing, as well as his coaching and training career. He is the founder of Equestrian Coach, an educational website.

== Life and career ==
=== Early career: equitation and eventing ===
Traurig was introduced to trail riding at age eleven. As a child, he rode in his Syosset, Long Island backyard, using a prefabricated garage as a stable. He joined the Meadow Brook Pony Club and trained with Molly Harnden and Sarah Schwartz twice a week. His first horse was Rusty, a strawberry roan gelding that was a good jumper. In 1961, at age 16, Traurig won AHSA Medal Finals and the ASPCA Maclay Medal Finals on Troublemaker. After winning the Maclay Finals, he began training with Vladimir S. Littauer. He also became a working student for Frank Chapot and trained with the United States Equestrian Team in New Jersey. He was a member of the United States Three-day Eventing Team, and he placed second in the trials for the 1964 Olympic Games. Due to an injury to his horse, Traurig did not attend the Olympic Games, and his eventing career was over.

=== Later career: Showjumping and dressage ===
After his eventing career ended, Traurig moved on to showjumping and trained with Bertalan de Nemethy. At age 21, Traurig started his own hunter-jumper business in Pennsylvania, selling horses and teaching lessons. After ten years living in Pennsylvania, Traurig moved to California. Traurig won his first Grand Prix at age 27. Over the span of his showjumping career, he has won over 60 show jumping Grand Prixs, and represented the United States Show Jumping Team several times including the 1982 World Championships in Dublin, Ireland. He has competed in eight World Cup Finals and was the winner of the United States League four times.

In dressage, Traurig was the winner of 15 Grand Prixs and Grand Prix special classes. He was short listed for the 1986 World Championship Trials and 1988 Olympic Games. He won the High Point Dressage Award in 1988 at the Olympic selection trials.

In 2009, Traurig was inducted into the National Show Hunter Hall of Fame. In 2010, he founded the Equestrian Coach website. He is considered an excellent teacher and a proponent of the forward riding system.

== Legacy ==
Traurig's students include USEF judges Cynthia Hankins and Cindy Weiner, and horse trainer Michael Matz. He was also a mentor to Olympic champion Will Simpson.

== Family ==
His son Michael, a hunter/jumper trainer, on October 19, 2021, was temporarily suspended by the United States Center for SafeSport for “allegations of misconduct”, issued a no-contact directive, and listed as ineligible by the U.S. Equestrian Federation; on January 26, 2022, sheriff’s detectives obtained a no-bail felony warrant for his arrest on two counts of child molestation.
