= Adrián Melosi =

Argentine equestrian

Personal information
- Nationality: Argentine
- Born: 10 December 1956 (age 68)

Sport
- Sport: Equestrian

Adrián Melosi (born 10 December 1956) is an Argentine equestrian. He competed in the team jumping event at the 1984 Summer Olympics.
