= Contador =

Contador may refer to:

- Contador, an official of the Spanish royal treasury; see Spanish colonization of the Americas

== People with the surname ==
- Alberto Contador (born 1982), Spanish cyclist
- Javiera Contador (born 1974), Chilean actress
- Victor Contador (born 1948), Chilean equestrian

== Places ==
- Contador Airport, an airport serving the town of Pitalito in the Huila Department of Colombia
- Estadio Contador Damiani, a football stadium in Montevideo, Uruguay
- Palacio Contador Gastón Guelfi, an indoor sporting arena that is located in Montevideo, Uruguay
