= Senator McReynolds =

Senator McReynolds may refer to:

- Allen McReynolds (1877–1960), Missouri State Senate
- Andrew T. McReynolds (1808–1898), Michigan State Senate
