= Joseph Fargis =

American equestrian

Joe Fargis
Personal information
- Born: Joseph Halpin Fargis IV; April 2, 1948 (age 78) New York City, United States
- Height: 1.87 m (6 ft 2 in)
- Weight: 75 kg (165 lb)

Sport
- Sport: Equestrianism
Medal record
Equestrian
Representing the United States
Olympic Games
Gold medal – first place	1984 Los Angeles	Individual jumping
Gold medal – first place	1984 Los Angeles	Team jumping
Silver medal – second place	1988 Seoul	Team jumping
Pan American Games
Gold medal – first place	1975 Mexico City	Team jumping

Joseph "Joe" Halpin Fargis IV (born April 2, 1948) is an American showjumper and Olympic champion. Fargis won showjumping individual gold and team gold at the 1984 Summer Olympics. He won showjumping team silver at the 1988 Summer Olympics. He is the owner of Sandron Farm.

== Early life ==
As a child, Fargis lived in Vienna, Virginia. He began riding in second grade after visiting a friend whose mother ran a riding school. Fargis learned to ride with trainer Jane Dillon at her Junior Equitation School in Vienna, Virginia. In 1966 he went to Francis Rowe's Foxwood Farm in Crozier, Virginia and stayed there for the next twelve years, until he began training with Bertalan de Nemethy. He rode at the Pennsylvania National Horse Show as a junior.

== Career ==
1970s

He first rode at the FEI Nations Cup in 1970 in Lucerne, Switzerland, as a member of the US team. In 1975, Fargis helped the US secure Team Gold at the 1975 Pan American Games in Mexico City, Mexico. In 1978, Fargis and his friend Conrad Homfeld became business partners in Sandron Farm.

1980s

Before the 1982 World Championships, the American team went to Hickstead as a warm-up, and Fargis had a fall that broke his leg. He was sidelined for much of the rest of the year. By fall 1982, Fargis was competing again. Riding Touch of Class, he won classes at Pennsylvania National, Washington International, and the National Horse Show. In 1983, Fargis was part of the United States Equestrian Team's Nation's Cup team with wins at Calgary and Rome. In 1984, Fargis and Touch Of Class won the Grand Prix of Tampa and were selected for the Olympic team. Before the Olympics, Fargis went with the American team to Europe where they won the Nation's Cup at Aachen. Fargis competed in showjumping at the 1984 Summer Olympics held in Los Angeles. There he won individual and team gold medals with the American-bred Thoroughbred mare Touch of Class. The pair set an Olympic record as they faulted only a single time throughout the competition, jumping clear over 90 of 91 obstacles. Fargis was the East Coast League's top qualifier to the 1985 FEI World Cup Finals. At the 1988 Summer Olympics Fargis, riding Irish-bred mare Mill Pearl, won team silver and finished seventh as an individual.

1990s

Fargis represented the United States at the FEI World Equestrian Games in Stockholm in 1990. In 1993, Fargis won the $50,000 Budweiser I Love New York Grandprix and the $50,000 Grandprix of New Hampshire. In 1999, he was second in the $60,000 American Gold Cup. In March 1999, Fargis broke a leg at a Florida show. Later in the year, he won the $25,000 Sally Hansen Grand Prix, riding 10-year-old Hanoverian, Edgar.

2000s

In 2000, Fargis won the Bayer/USET Wellington Cup and the I Love New York Grand Prix. In 2002, he won the International Open Jumper, the $75,000 Tommy Bahama Open, and the $25,000 Tommy Bahama WEF Challenge Cup.

2010s

In 2010, he won the $35,000 North Coast Grand Prix. Fargis won the $5,000 welcome stake on July 19, 2012, at the Chagrin Valley Hunter Jumper Classic and the $30,000 Duke Children's Grand Prix on November 9, 2013. Fargis had a serious fall at the 2014 Lexington Spring Encore, suffering broken ribs and a punctured lung as well as internal bleeding.

== Awards and influence ==
Fargis has been called "a leading figure in showjumping" and received the 2012 Lifetime Achievement Award from the US Equestrian Federation. He has been inducted into the Show Jumping Hall of Fame, the Virginia Horse Show Association Hall of Fame, the Virginia Horse Center Hall of Fame and the Pennsylvania Horse Show Hall of Fame. He has also been named AHSA Horseman of the Year and has received the USHJA Lifetime Achievement Award. His Sandron Farm is recognized as an influential training facility that has produced many great horses and riders. Fargis has also had a lasting effect on the administration of horse sport in the United States as a committee member of the American Horse Show Association (the predecessor to the US Equestrian Federation), United States Hunter Jumper Association, and United States Equestrian Team. Fargis is considered one of the best clinicians in the United States and internationally.
