= Ove Hansen =

Ove Hansen may refer to:

- Ove Hansen (equestrian)
- Ove Hansen (footballer, born 1929)
- Ove Hansen (footballer, born 1966)
