= Federico Garza =

Mexican equestrian (born 1964)

Personal information
- Nationality: Mexican
- Born: 23 December 1964 (age 60)

Sport
- Sport: Equestrian

Federico Garza (born 23 December 1964) is a Mexican equestrian. He competed in the team jumping event at the 1984 Summer Olympics.
