= Peter Luther =

German equestrian (1939–2024)

Medal record

Equestrian

Representing West Germany

Olympic Games
Bronze medal – third place	1984 Los Angeles	Team jumping

Peter Luther (2 January 1939 – 15 October 2024) was a German equestrian and Olympic medalist. He competed in show jumping at the 1984 Summer Olympics in Los Angeles, and won a bronze medal with the German team.

Luther died on 15 October 2024, at the age of 85.
