= Timothy Grubb =

British equestrian

Medal record

Equestrian

Representing Great Britain

Olympic Games
Silver medal – second place	1984 Los Angeles	Team jumping

Timothy Grubb (30 May 1954 – 11 May 2010) was a British show jumping champion. In 1984 he participated at the Summer Olympics held in Los Angeles where he won a silver medal in team jumping with the British team.

== Early life ==
He was born in Grantham, living in Bitchfield, the son of John Grubb. In 1966 he moved to Garthorpe, Leicestershire. He attended the former independent Priory College and High School in Stamford, with sister Elaine, where he competed in athletics, the 220 yards and long jump.

His sister Susanne worked at the Newark Advertiser. By 1977, he lived in Stonesby in Leicestershire.

== Personal life ==
He married Michele McEvoy in December 1978 and they had a boy and a girl. They later divorced. From Stathern, he moved to the US in 1982.

He died from heart failure in Illinois on 11 May 2010.
