= Filippo Moyersoen =

Italian equestrian

Personal information
- Nationality: Italian
- Born: 30 August 1954 (age 70); Milan, Italy

Sport
- Sport: Equestrian

Filippo Moyersoen (born 30 August 1954) is an Italian equestrian. He competed in the team jumping event at the 1984 Summer Olympics.
