= Pinker Pinker =

Australian-bred Thoroughbred racehorse

- Sire: Reset
- Grandsire: Zabeel
- Dam: Miss Marion
- Damsire: Success Express
- Sex: Mare
- Foaled: 28 August 2007
- Died: 4 April 2012 (aged 4)
- Country: Australia
- Colour: Bay or Brown
- Trainer: Greg Eurell
- Record: 18: 6-3-2
- Earnings: A$2,609,368

Major wins
- W S Cox Plate (2011); Angus Armanasco Stakes (2011); Let's Elope Stakes (2011); Schweppervescence Trophy (2011)

Pinker Pinker was a notable Australian thoroughbred racehorse.

A daughter of Reset (AUS) from the mare Miss Marion (AUS), she was foaled in 2007 and was trained throughout her career by Greg Eurell.

Pinker Pinker showed above average ability from an early age with Group 1 placings in the AJC Oaks and Epsom Handicap.

Her biggest win was in the 2011 Cox Plate when ridden by Craig Williams.

In April 2012, when being prepared for the Queen of the Turf Stakes she suffered anaphylactic shock following an injection from veterinary staff and died.
