= Greg Eurell =

Australian horse racing trainer

Personal information
- Born: 17 June 1960 (age 66) Sydney, Australia
- Occupation: Horse Trainer

Horse racing career
- Sport: Horse racing

Significant horses
- Apache Cat; Pinker Pinker

Greg Eurell (born 17 June 1960) is an Australian racing trainer best known for training the champion Apache Cat and Cox Plate winner Pinker Pinker.

Also a trained equestrian, he represented Australia in show jumping at the 1984 Olympic Games held in Los Angeles.

== See also ==
- Thoroughbred racing in Australia
