= Rodolfo Escalera =

American painter

Rodolfo "Rudy" Escalera
- Born: Rodolfo Escalera Vizcaíno; June 1, 1929; Gómez Palacio, Durango, Mexico
- Died: January 25, 2000 (aged 70); Lerdo, Durango, Mexico
- Education: Architecture studies (United States)
- Known for: Realist oil painting; collectible plates for 1984 Summer Olympics and 1986 FIFA World Cup
- Notable work: 1984 Summer Olympics plate series* *1986 World Cup plate*
- Movement: Realism
- Awards: Valor Lagunero (Torreón, Coahuila); Ciudadano Distinguido (Lerdo, Durango)

Rodolfo "Rudy" Escalera (also known as Rodolfo Escalera Vizcaíno; June 1, 1929 – January 25, 2000) was a Mexican-American artist. Among other works, he created collectible plates for the 1984 Summer Olympics, which became "The Official Gift of the 1984 Olympics". Escalera also created a collectible plate for the 1986 World cup hosted in Mexico. Escalera's primary medium was oils on canvas. The majority of his works are based in realism as he did not like abstract painting.

== Biography ==
Escalera started his professional career after taking on a project his father was commissioned to do, but could not complete having suffering from a stroke that resulted in paralysis. In 1948 Escalera moved from Mexico to California where he briefly attended school to study architecture and learn English as a second language. By 1950 Escalera was working at an advertising firm that held a contract with Azteca Films, a company that produced movies in Mexico and distributed them in the United States. Escalera was given artistic freedom and the Azteca account to manage. He created many pieces that were used as posters, advertisements, and movie covers for the films produced. In 1961 Escalera opened his own advertising agency “Escalera Production Art” and began creating the first of his “Five Masterpieces”.

In 1980 Escalera entered into the plate collector business. He mainly created children's plates and was featured in magazines such as The Plate Collector. This medium led to him applying for the licensing right to be an official licensee for the 1984 Summer Olympics. He was awarded the license and commissioned to create nine paintings, depicting many of the olympic events. The paintings were converted into high quality collectible porcelain plates and sold, in limited edition quantities, to the general public. The plates were also used by the Olympic committee as the "official gift" and presented to all of the visiting dignitaries throughout the world. After the Olympics Escalera was commissioned to create a painting for the 1986 World Cup, held in Mexico City.

In 1988 Escalera Moved to an area near his home town in Lerdo, Durango Mexico. Upon his return, a neighboring city, Torreon, Coahuila awarded Escalera with an official plaque from the city recognizing him as Valor Lagunero, an award the city offers to citizens who have had significant accomplishments throughout their lifetime. Lerdo, Durango, awarded him the designation of Ciudadano Distinguido or "very distinguished citizen". Escalera’s home town of Gomez Palacio, Durango named the largest showroom at "La Casa De La Cultura" (The House of Culture) after him at a dedication promoting art in all of its varying formats. In 1994 Escalera was diagnosed with cancer and died six years later on January 25, 2000.

== Notable owners of Escalera paintings ==
Escalera’s painting entitled The Mailman was donated to Hugh Hefner in 2003 by Escalera's sons Robert and Rudy Escalera. The painting is on display at the Playboy Mansion. This painting features a mailman reading the first edition of Playboy magazine. He is sitting on some steps surrounded by women who are behind and posing flirtatiously.

After the death of country music star Marty Robbins, Escalera presented Robbins' widow with a painting named after and depicting her late husband. The painting was presented ceremoniously onstage at the Grand Ole Opry in honor of the famous singer.

Escalera's was the only Olympic project endorsed by Los Angeles Mayor Tom Bradley. At a meeting with Escalera, Bradley commented: "We are deeply honored that Rudy Escalera, one of Los Angeles's outstanding artists, has been licensed to paint the official Licensed Commemorative plate collection for our 1984 Olympic games." 250 sets of plates were created for dignitaries attending the games including Mayor Bradley, President Ronald Reagan and the Prince of Wales.

== List of paintings ==
Rodolfo Escalera Vizcaíno created more than 70 works of art including five masterpieces that took him approximately 20 years to complete.
