= 1984 Summer Olympics opening ceremony =

- Part of 1984 Summer Olympics
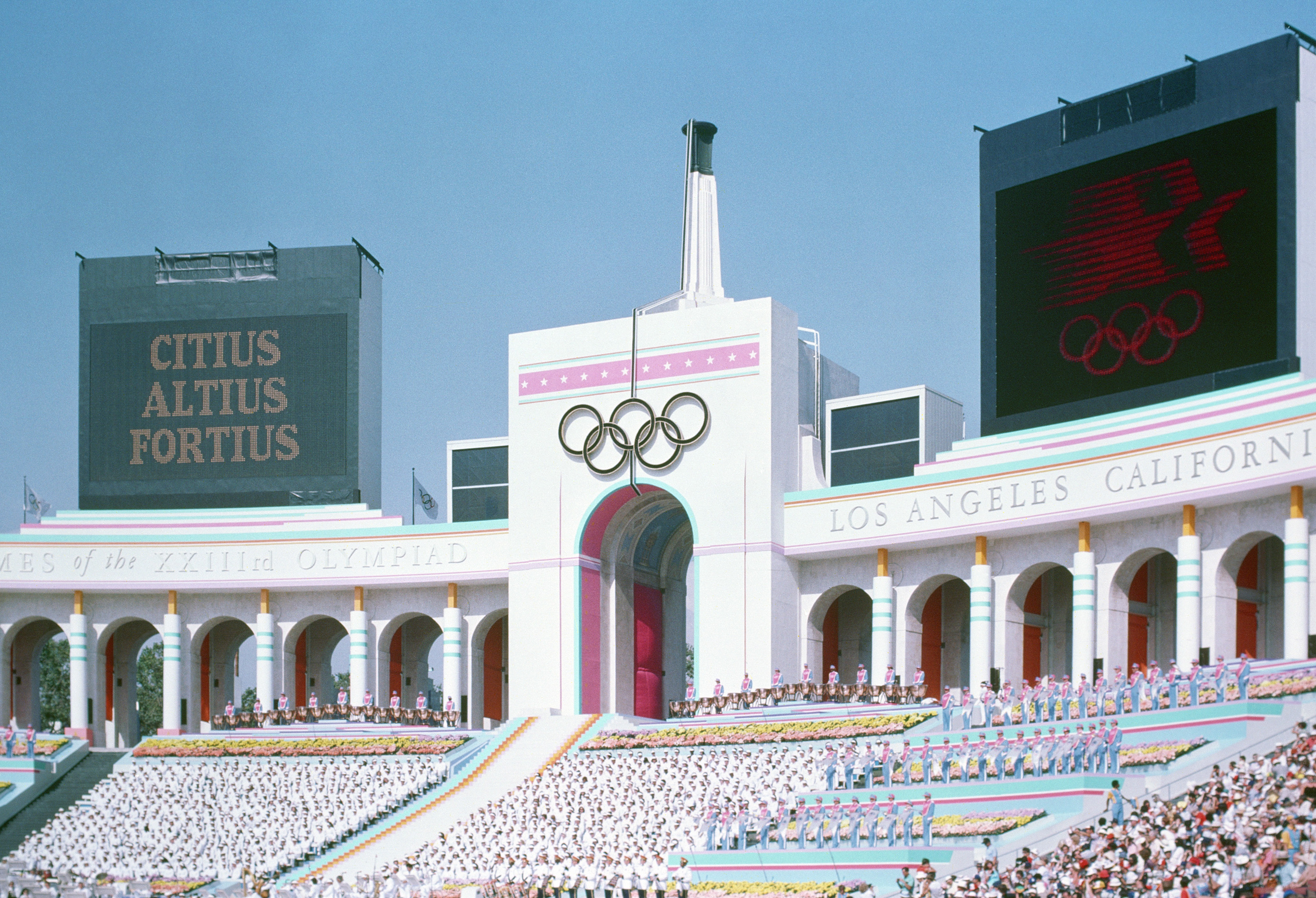
- The Opening Ceremony at the Los Angeles Memorial Coliseum
- Date: July 28, 1984; 41 years ago
- Time: 16:30 – 20:30 PDT (UTC–7)
- Venue: Los Angeles Memorial Coliseum
- Location: Los Angeles, United States; 34°0′51″N 118°17′16″W
- Also known as: Music of America
- Filmed by: ABC Sports

The opening ceremony of the 1984 Summer Olympic Games took place on the afternoon of Saturday, July 28, in the Los Angeles Memorial Coliseum, Los Angeles. As mandated by the Olympic Charter, the proceedings combined the formal ceremonial opening of this international sporting event (including welcoming speeches, hoisting of the flags and the parade of athletes) with an artistic spectacle to showcase the host nation's culture. The 1984 Games were formally opened by President of the United States Ronald Reagan. The event was conducted in front of 92,516 attendants. The ceremony was a $5 million production, titled Music of America.

== Preparations ==
Preparations began nine months before the Olympics start date. According to the official report, LAOOC asked the Walt Disney Company's production team to come up with preliminary ideas for the opening ceremony. Their concept was a festival parade down Figueroa Street from Downtown Los Angeles to the Coliseum. A grand stand for officials would be built, along with bleachers for ticket buyers throughout the route. The proposed cost was double of what the LAOOC had budgeted and asked Disney to cover half the cost. Disney declined and the idea was scrapped. LAOOC eventually hired David L. Wolper to produce and Tommy Walker as director of ceremonies.

Various actors and singers requested to be in the ceremony, including 35 known entertainers had offered to sing the national anthem. They declined all celebrities and focused on local youth talent as not to take away from the emotional objective of the ceremony, no "passive attitude" from the audience. Eventually, 1,262 member drill team, 400 member professional dance team, a 800 marching band, 85 pianists, 300 member gospel choir, a 1,000 member orchestra choir with a 60 piece orchestra and finally 1,500 various ethnic group club member volunteers for the finale of "Reach out and Touch" segment were chosen to represent the US youth and talent. More than 5,000 costumes were distributed. Ceremony rehearsals were primarily held at El Segundo High School. One month prior, marching band members practiced at Pepperdine University. Sheet music was sent to band members months prior to practice, to focus on the marching elements instead of the music at Pepperdine.

== Officials and guests ==
Seated in the press box were President of the United States Ronald Reagan and First Lady of the United States Nancy Reagan. International guests included President of the International Olympic Committee Juan Antonio Samaranch, Grand Duke Jean of Luxembourg and the Prince of Wales (now Charles III). Various celebrities were in attendance, including Linda Evans, Burt Lancaster, Bob Hope, Steven Spielberg, Gene Kelly and Brooke Shields.

== Proceedings ==
=== Countdown ===
A countdown clock at the screen from 60 to 1 was used in Los Angeles Memorial Coliseum to announce the commencement of the ceremony. Citywide church bells and large cannons rang throughout the city to announce the start of 1984 Los Angeles Summer Olympic Games.

==== Welcome ====
The official ceremony started with the first segment, "Welcome", a special song written by Marvin Hamlisch and Dean Pitchford. Over 1,000 volunteers held large, five-foot balloons, each with a ribbon banner attached with the word "Welcome" written in over 100 languages. Bill Suitor flew from the peristyle to the track on the south end via a Bell Aerosystems rocket pack (also known as a jet pack). The performers formed the word "Welcome" on the field, skywriters typed the word "Welcome" in the sky and various volunteers passed out flowers in the aisles to the crowd.

When the song ended, the balloons were released into the air and dignitaries were introduced, namely IOC president Samaranch and President Reagan. "Hail to the Chief" was played to introduce President Reagan, followed by the U.S. national anthem and "Fanfare for the Common Man" by Aaron Copland.

=== Artistic program ===
==== Music of America ====
Los Angeles produced an artistic interpretation of the American lifestyle and popular culture called Music of America.

The first segment opened with American Suite, performed by an 800-member marching band consisting primarily of members from colleges in the Los Angeles area. However, there was also at least one member from every U.S. state. They performed American style marching sequences and marching precision.

The second segment, called Pioneer Spirit, depicted the American Old West. It consisted of a 410-member ballet group performing a hoedown dance sequence with various props, including wagons and old west towns.

The third segment, Dixieland Jamboree, depicted a traditional southern U.S. gospel choir featuring 300 members singing the African-American spiritual "When the Saints Go Marching In", led by singer Etta James in a 19th-century New Orleans, Louisiana church setting.

The fourth segment, Urban Rhapsody, featured George Gershwin's "Rhapsody in Blue". 84 grand pianos appeared from the Coliseum's peristyles, followed by the orchestra and over 200 dancers.

The fifth segment, The World Stage, consisted of a 1940s big band orchestra medley performed by the marching band, featuring songs mostly from Broadway, movies and popular music. Among the songs heard in this segment were "Sing, Sing, Sing", "Take the 'A' Train", "Steppin' Out with My Baby" (from Easter Parade), "Cheek to Cheek (I'm in Heaven)" (from "Top Hat"), "One" (from A Chorus Line), the theme from Fame, and the Michael Jackson hit "Beat It". Joining the orchestra were 1,500 dancers.

The sixth and final segment ended with the entire cast dancing and forming the outlined map of the United States to the strains of "America the Beautiful".

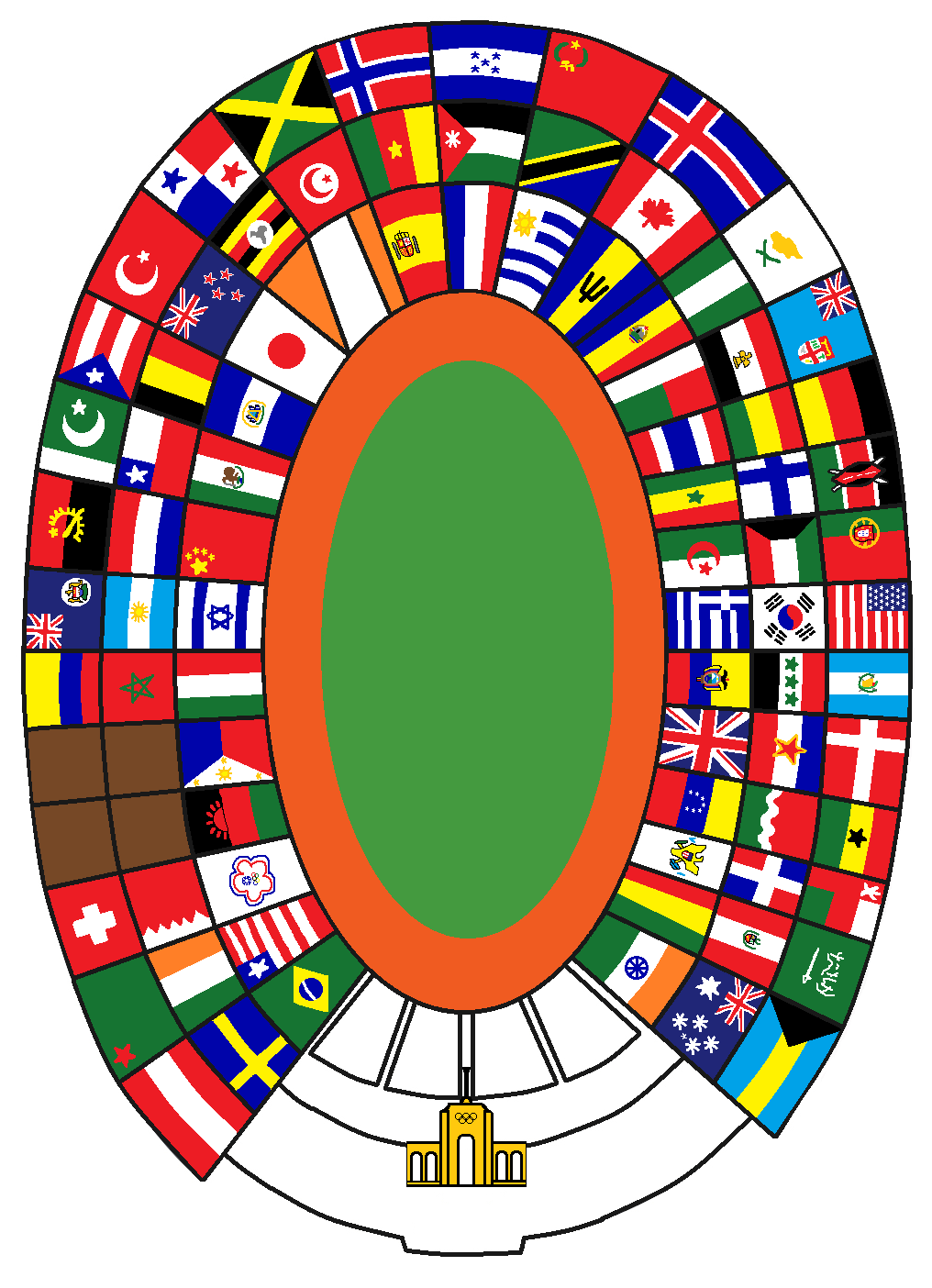
Schematic diagram that shows the disposition of the card stunt

=== Flags of the world ===
Each seat in the Coliseum had a card placed underneath. At the count of three, each attendant flipped the card skyward and the crowd produced the biggest card stunt, displaying the flags of many participating nations.

=== Parade of Nations ===
John Williams performed his dedicated theme to the games, "Olympic Fanfare and Theme". Volunteer performers entered the stadium, marching with white Olympic flags. They formed the 1984 Olympic logo, as well as the "Stars in Motion" outline on the field.

The Antwerp flag was then presented to Los Angeles Mayor Tom Bradley by Louis Guirandou-N'Diaye, Alexandre de Mérode, Aileen Riggin Soule, and Alice Lord Landon, as Bradley had not been present at the closing ceremonies of the 1980 Summer Olympics in Moscow four years earlier.

The parade of 140 National Olympic Committees began with Greece, as per tradition. Speeches were then made by Los Angeles Olympic Organizing Committee president Peter Ueberroth and IOC president Samaranch. For the first time, a sitting U.S. president opened the games in person, as President Reagan declared the competition officially open.

"Celebrating the 23d Olympiad of the modern era, I declare open the Olympic Games of Los Angeles."

— Ronald Reagan, President of the United States of America

The Olympic flag entered the stadium, and an instrumental version of the Olympic Hymn was played. Afterward, homing pigeons were released.

=== The cauldron ===
The same cauldron from the 1932 Summer Olympics (also held in Los Angeles) was used, but now lighted by a person. The orchestra played The Olympian, composed and conducted by Philip Glass. The torch entered the stadium carried by Gina Hemphill, granddaughter of U.S. Olympian Jesse Owens, who circled the track then handed the torch to 1960 Olympic decathlon gold medalist Rafer Johnson, who completed the torch relay as mechanical steps rose from the center of the peristyles. Johnson climbed the stairs and faced the crowd as The Olympian was still being played, then lit the gas powered Olympic rings that connect with the Olympic cauldron, amidst cheers from the crowd. He became the first Black athlete in Olympic history to light the cauldron during the opening ceremony. Edwin Moses took the athletes' oath, Sharon Weber took the judges' oath, and a children's chorus performed Ludwig van Beethoven's "Ode to Joy".

=== Finale ===
Vicki McClure, a local supermarket checker, led the crowd in a performance of the Diana Ross song "Reach Out and Touch (Somebody's Hand)". All attendees were requested to sing along, as the words were displayed on the screens surrounding the stadium. All the volunteers, athletes, and audience members, as well as cast members dressed in traditional native dress from all over the world, joined in. On the big screens, various children in Japan, Australia, Africa and Latin America joined hands, singing along to the song, and a large fireworks finale followed.

== Anthems ==
- National Anthem of the United States
- (International Olympic Committee) Olympic Hymn

== TV coverage ==
The ABC network was the official broadcaster of the games in the U.S. and feeder to other networks outside the U.S. Peter Jennings and Jim McKay were the announcers in the U.S., marking McKay's 10th broadcast.

== Awards and accolades ==
The broadcast was awarded the Emmy Award for Outstanding Live Sports Special.

== Legacy ==
The 1984 opening ceremony was the first to present the "artistic" segment before the "ceremonial" portion of the events, with this order having been followed ever since. The ceremony was also the first time a person of African descent lit the Olympic cauldron.

== See also ==
- 1984 Summer Olympics closing ceremony
- 1984 Summer Paralympics
