= Marcelo Blessman =

Brazilian equestrian

Personal information
- Nationality: Brazilian
- Born: 9 March 1961 (age 64)

Sport
- Sport: Equestrian

Marcelo Blessman (born 9 March 1961) is a Brazilian equestrian. He competed in two events at the 1984 Summer Olympics.
