= Giorgio Nuti =

Italian equestrian (born 1954)

Personal information
- Nationality: Italian
- Born: 17 February 1954 (age 71) Somma Lombardo, Italy

Sport
- Sport: Equestrian

Giorgio Nuti (born 17 February 1954) is an Italian equestrian. He competed at the 1976 Summer Olympics, the 1984 Summer Olympics and the 1992 Summer Olympics.
