= Bruno Scolari =

Italian equestrian

Personal information
- Nationality: Italian
- Born: 29 January 1961; Monza, Italy
- Died: 28 April 2009 (aged 48); Vimercate, Italy

Sport
- Sport: Equestrian

Bruno Scolari (29 January 1961 – 28 April 2009) was an Italian equestrian. He competed in two events at the 1984 Summer Olympics.
