= Caio Sérgio de Carvalho =

Brazilian equestrian

Caio Sérgio Caio
Personal information
- Nationality: Brazilian
- Born: 23 April 1953 (age 71)

Sport
- Sport: Equestrian

Caio Sérgio Caio (born 23 April 1953) is a Brazilian equestrian. He competed in two events at the 1984 Summer Olympics.
