= Ove Hansen (equestrian) =

Norwegian equestrian

Personal information
- Nationality: Norwegian
- Born: 27 April 1957 (age 68) Haugesund, Norway

Sport
- Sport: Equestrian

Ove Hansen (born 27 April 1957) is a Norwegian equestrian. He competed at the 1984 Summer Olympics and the 1988 Summer Olympics.
