= George Sanna =

Australian equestrian (born 1952)

Personal information
- Nationality: Australian
- Born: 15 March 1952 (age 73); Perth, Western Australia

Sport
- Sport: Equestrian

George Sanna (born 15 March 1952) is an Australian equestrian. He competed at the 1984 Summer Olympics and the 1988 Summer Olympics.

He is married to fellow Australian equestrian Rachael Sanna.
