= Oswaldo Méndez =

Guatemalan equestrian

Personal information
- Nationality: Guatemalan
- Born: 18 December 1956 (age 68)

Sport
- Sport: Equestrian

Oswaldo Méndez (born 18 December 1956) is a Guatemalan equestrian. He competed in show jumping at the 1976 Summer Olympics in Montreal when he placed 22nd, and at the 1980 Summer Olympics in Moscow, where he placed fourth in the individual competition. At the time, it was the best ever Olympic result for Guatemala.
