= Herman Van Den Broeck =

Belgian equestrian

Personal information
- Nationality: Belgian
- Born: 30 January 1956 (age 69); Merksem, Belgium

Sport
- Sport: Equestrian

Herman Van Den Broeck (born 30 January 1956) is a Belgian equestrian. He competed in two events at the 1984 Summer Olympics.
