= Thierry Rozier =

French show jumping rider

Medal record

Equestrian

Representing France

Mediterranean Games
Silver medal – second place	2005 Almeria	Individual jumping
Silver medal – second place	2005 Almeria	Team jumping

Thierry Rozier (born 31 July 1964) is the son of Olympic medalist Marcel Rozier and the brother of Philippe Rozier, who is also an Olympic class rider. Thierry Rozier is a French show jumping rider. He represents the Team Marionnaud, which is organized by his father and is sponsored by the French perfume company Chez Marionnaud. His father owns the prestigious Espace Rozier, which is the central base of the Marionnaud team, in Bois-le-Roi, Seine-et-Marne. Additionally, since 2001, Rozier has played an integral part in the show jumping training of Charlotte Casiraghi.

In July 2005, an FEI arbitration court suspended Rozier for three months from the show jumping sport after he was disqualified from the Mediterranean Games. The reason was that his horse, Dusty Star, tested positive for dexamethasone, an anti-inflammatory corticosteroid., Rozier was quoted by the Cavadeos magazine explaining that Dusty Star had indeed tested positive for dexamethasone at the June 2005 games in Almeria. He hired an attorney to appeal the suspension, insisting that he was blameless and that there was no rational motive or evidence to the contrary. Moreover, he was convinced that the cause of the contamination had been accidental, either while Dusty Star was in transport or in the common stables at Almeria.

In October 2003, with ten-year-old grey mare Aber Hallo Marionnaud, he won the Grand Prize at the CSI* Barbizon. In November 2003, he achieved 7th place at the CSI* Bois le Roi. In May 2005, he achieved an unprecedented no-fault victory in the CSI** Jump Bost at Fontainebleau.

== Medals ==
- Silver Medal, team, 2005 Mediterranean Games, Almeria

== See also ==
- Equestrian at the 2005 Mediterranean Games
