= Alberto Honrubia =

Spanish equestrian

Personal information
- Full name: Alberto Honrubia Alvariño
- Born: 22 September 1964 (age 60); Avilés, Asturias, Spain
- Height: 172 cm (5 ft 8 in)
- Weight: 69 kg (152 lb)

Sport
- Country: Spain
- Sport: Equestrian

Alberto Honrubia Alvariño (Note: In this Spanish name, the first or paternal surname is Honrubia and the second or maternal family name is Alvariño.) (born 22 September 1964) is a Spanish equestrian. He competed in two events at the 1984 Summer Olympics.
