= Bruno Candrian =

Swiss equestrian

Personal information
- Nationality: Swiss
- Born: 21 May 1947 (age 77)

Sport
- Sport: Equestrian

Bruno Candrian (born 21 May 1947) is a Swiss equestrian. He competed at the 1976 Summer Olympics and the 1984 Summer Olympics.
