= Allen McReynolds =

American politician

Member of the Missouri Senate from the 28th district
- In office elected 1934 – ?

Personal details
- Born: November 7, 1877 Carthage, Missouri, US
- Died: September 29, 1960 (aged 82) Carthage, Missouri, US
- Party: Democratic
- Spouse: Maude Atwood Clark
- Children: 2 (1 son, 1 daughter)
- Education: University of Missouri

Allen McReynolds (November 7, 1877 - September 29, 1960) was an American politician from Carthage, Missouri, who served in the Missouri Senate. He served in the Missouri National Guard. McReynolds was educated in Missouri public schools and at the University of Missouri. In 1940, he ran for the Democratic nomination for governor of Missouri as a reformist opposed to the urban machines of Bernard F. Dickmann in St. Louis and Tom Pendergast in Kansas City. His daughter Helen Elizabeth married George Rozier, a state senator from Jefferson City, Missouri.
