= Melanie Smith (equestrian) =

American equestrian

Personal information
- Born: Melanie Ainsworth Smith; September 23, 1949 (age 76) Memphis, Tennessee, U.S.
Medal record
Equestrian
Representing the United States
Olympic Games
Gold medal – first place	1984 Los Angeles	Team jumping
Pan American Games
Gold medal – first place	1979 San Juan	Team jumping

Melanie Smith (born September 23, 1949) is an equestrian from the United States and Olympic champion.

She was born in Germantown, Tennessee, and grew up on her parents' farm learning to ride horses. She won several amateur competitions and got better at her sport, advancing into the Grand Prix class in 1976. She won many of the top competitions in this class over her long career in show jumping.

She was on the U.S. gold medal team in the Pan American Games in 1979, riding Val de Loire. She qualified for the 1980 Olympics, but did not compete due to the U.S. Olympic Committee's boycott of the 1980 Summer Olympics in Moscow, Russia. She was one of 461 athletes to receive a Congressional Gold Medal instead. She also won a bronze medal in the individual jumping category on Calypso at the Alternate Olympics. She qualified for the Olympics again four years later in 1984, and helped win the first team gold for the U.S. in Olympic Show Jumping, again riding Calypso. In 1980 she placed second in the World Cup on Calypso, and at the 1982 World Cup, she won. She also rode Calypso to help the U.S. team win the Nations Cup and the World Cup in 1983. She won the show jumping triple crown on Calypso, becoming one of two riders to achieve that honor, as well as the only horse/rider team ever to do it.

Smith was inducted into the Show Jumping Hall of Fame in 1988. Her mount, Calypso, is in the Show Jumping Hall of Fame. Smith was included in the Tennessee Sports Hall of Fame in 1998.

She married Lee Taylor in 1985, and lives on Wildwood Farm in Germantown, where she continues to breed thoroughbred horses for show jumping, hunting, and polo. She worked with her husband on the farm until his death in 2005. Since her retirement, Smith has provided commentary for many major televised jumping events and taught horse clinics throughout the United States, including at her own farm. She has judged competitions and designed courses for show jumping. She wrote the book Riding With Life: Lessons from the Horse, about what she has learned over the years living with horses.

== Early life and career ==
Melanie Ainsworth Smith was born on her parents' farm in Germantown, Tennessee on September 23, 1949. She started riding around the age of two and was involved in competition with horses at an early age through her membership in the local Pony Club. Smith's mother ran a riding school at their farm, and she learned to ride from her mother when she was younger. She was trained by George Morris from 1968 to 1970. After this period of training, she went to live in Stonington, Connecticut, on Neil and Helen Eustace's Stillmeadow farm. The Eustaces bought horses from breeders in Europe, and had them delivered to the U.S. for Smith to ride, including Radnor II, Val de Loir, and Calypso.

Smith went on to the Grand Prix tour riding Radnor II in 1976 and won the American Grand Prix Lady Rider of the Year Award as well as the Overall Rider of the Year Award. This event led to the AGA's decision to stop giving out their separate Lady Rider of the Year Award. This was because Smith had helped prove, in winning both awards, that a woman could do just as well in the Grand Prix tour as the men who they were competing against for the Overall Award, so there was no need for a separate award. In 1979, the Supersisters trading card set was produced and distributed; one of the cards featured Smith's name and picture. Around the beginning of 1981, Smith was hired as a rider at Windrush Farms, in Litchfield, CT. She stayed on this farm for the rest of her competition years.

== Career in show jumping competition ==
Smith Taylor had two different mounts at the beginning of her career on the Grand Prix Tour, Radnor II, and then Val de Loir. While riding Radnor II, Smith was named to the second reserve position for the 1976 U.S. Olympic Team. Val de Loir won the AGA horse of the year the same year that Smith won the Lady's and Overall Awards, 1978. Smith was riding Val de Loir when she was on the gold medal team in the Pan American games in 1979. Smith switched mounts soon afterwards to a bay Dutch show jumping horse named Calypso. Calypso's sire was a Dutch show jumper as well, named Lucky Boy, who sired several other successful jumpers. Calypso was a smaller horse for show jumping, at just over 16 hands, but together, he and Smith won many competitions during the years they competed in show jumping. Calypso and Smith became the only horse-rider team ever to win all three parts in the triple crown of show jumping competition; The American Invitational, The International Jumping Derby, and the American Gold Cup.

In 1980, Smith and Calypso won a bronze medal in the Alternate Olympics. She qualified for the Olympics again four years later in Los Angeles, and it was there that Smith and Calypso helped the United States Equestrian Team win their first Olympic Gold medal in the sport. Calypso had been injured going into this competition, but he still performed spectacularly. In 1980 she placed second in the World Cup on Calypso, and at the 1982 World Cup, she won. She also rode Calypso to help the U.S. team win the Nations Cup and the World Cup in 1983. (Calypso sports hall of fame)Smith retired when Windrush Farm, the farm she had been riding for, went bankrupt. She then moved to Tennessee and married Lee Taylor. Calypso was purchased by Smith's husband, Lee Taylor, as a wedding present and brought to their Wildwood Farm in Tennessee to live there in retirement from 1988-2002. Calypso died at age 29 after a long and successful career and a peaceful retirement together with his rider, Smith.

== Career after retirement from show jumping ==
Smith Taylor retired from show jumping competition around the same time that Calypso did: 1987, but she did not retire from working for and with horses and their riders. She commentated for NBC and NBCSN for major televised show jumping events, including the Olympics. She also designed some courses herself for show jumping, judged for various hunter/jumper events, and wrote a book about her life with horses called Riding With Life: Lessons from the Horse. Through all of these activities, Smith has continued to work with horses directly. With her husband Lee as a partner, Smith has bred many thoroughbred horses for show jumping, but also for hunting and polo. Smith has also worked for the younger generation of show jumping riders and young horse enthusiasts. Smith was the coach for the Developing Rider Tours from 2007-2008. The U.S. Equestrian team named her the Developmental Coach of the Year in 2007. Around the same time period, she also worked with the Hunter Jumper Association on their Emerging Athlete's Program. After her husband Lee Taylor died, Smith started the program for teaching young riders that she and her husband had always hoped for. The program, called TaylorMade Horsemanship, is taught by Smith at various locations around the U.S., with the aim of helping riders get better at their sport through improving their physical skill, as well as their ability to communicate and understand their mounts. Smith has led several similar horsemanship improvement clinics on riding and jumping at her Wildwood Farm in Germantown, Tennessee as well.

== Wildwood Farm ==
Wildwood Farm is a 350 acre farm off of Germantown Rd. in Germantown, owned by Smith Taylor and her husband Lee Taylor. The farm has been on the National Register of Historic Places since 2017. It has large fields for the American Thoroughbred horses that are bred there, as well as a 18,000 square ft. stable block. Smith lived at Wildwood Farm following her marriage to Taylor. Lee Taylor bought Calypso for Smith in 1987 as a wedding present and he was brought home to live at Wildwood Farm with them in his retirement years. Calypso died when he was 29 after fourteen years of peaceful retirement on the farm. Smith and her husband lived at Wildwood Farm together since 1989, breeding horses and running clinics at the farm. In 2005, Lee died, but Smith continues to live on the farm, working with horses.

== Competitive achievements ==
Year	Event	Finish	Horse
1976	Olympics	Second Reserve (did not compete)	Radnor II
1979	Pan American Games	team gold	Val de Loire
1979	American Jumping Derby	1st	Calypso
1980	Alternate Olympics	individual bronze	Calypso
1980	Nations Cup	team gold	Calypso
1982	American Invitational	1st	Calypso
1982	American Gold Cup	1st	Calypso
1982	World Cup	individual gold	Calypso
1982	World Championships	4th team	Calypso
1982	World Championships	10th individual	Calypso
1983	World Cup	team gold	Calypso
1983	Nations Cup	team gold	Calypso
1984	Olympics	team gold	Calypso
