= Ferdi Tyteca =

Belgian equestrian (born 1954)

Personal information
- Nationality: Belgian
- Born: 27 December 1954 (age 70); Beveren, Belgium

Sport
- Sport: Equestrian

Ferdi Tyteca (born 27 December 1954) is a Belgian former equestrian. He competed in two events at the 1984 Summer Olympics.
