= George Rozier =

American politician

George A. Rozier (August 13, 1902 - 1984) was an American Republican politician and lawyer who has served in the Missouri General Assembly in the Missouri Senate being first elected to the senate in 1934. He also served as the Prosecuting Attorney of Perry County, Missouri, having been first elected to this position in 1926.

Born in St. Mary, Missouri, he was educated at Perryville public schools, Chaminade College in Clayton, and at Saint Louis University where he received a law degree. Rozier practiced law for over 50 years, mostly in Jefferson City, Missouri. He resigned his senate seat in October 1941 to become chief counsel for the state Unemployment Compensation Commission. In 1941, Rozier also became president of the State Historical Society of Missouri.

George Rozier's paternal great-grandfather Jean Ferdinand Rozier left France in 1806 and settled in Ste. Genevieve, Missouri, in 1811, and his father Pratte had founded the Rozier Mercantile Company in Perryville, Missouri, in 1903. His wife Helen Elizabeth McReynolds was the daughter Allen McReynolds, a state senator who was a legislative colleague to George Rozier. They were married on September 21, 1941. George Rozier died in 1984 and was buried at Riverview Cemetery in Cole County, Missouri. His wife died in Jefferson City, Missouri, in 2010 at the age of 103.
