= Jorge Carneiro =

Brazilian equestrian

Personal information
- Born: 11 September 1956 (age 68); Rio de Janeiro, Brazil

Sport
- Sport: Equestrian

Jorge Carneiro (born 11 September 1956) is a Brazilian equestrian. He competed in two events at the 1984 Summer Olympics.
