= Alfredo Sone =

Chilean equestrian

Personal information
- Nationality: Chilean
- Born: 17 September 1965 (age 59)

Sport
- Sport: Equestrian

Alfredo Sone (born 17 September 1965) is a Chilean equestrian. He competed in two events at the 1984 Summer Olympics.
