= Axel Verlooy =

Belgian equestrian

Personal information
- Nationality: Belgian
- Born: 20 November 1963 (age 61); Mechelen, Belgium

Sport
- Sport: Equestrian

Axel Verlooy (born 20 November 1963) is a Belgian equestrian. He competed in two events at the 1984 Summer Olympics.
