= Jeff McVean =

Australian equestrian

Personal information
- Nationality: Australian
- Born: 21 December 1954 (age 70)

Sport
- Sport: Equestrian

Jeff McVean (born 21 December 1954) is an Australian former equestrian. He competed at the 1984 Summer Olympics and the 1988 Summer Olympics.
