= Marcel Rozier =

French equestrian

Medal record

Equestrian

Representing France

Olympic Games
Gold medal – first place	1976 Montreal	Team show jumping
Silver medal – second place	1968 Mexico City	Team show jumping

Marcel Rozier (born 22 March 1936) is an equestrian from France and Olympic champion. He also owns the renowned Espace Rozier equestrian center in Bois-le-Roi, Seine-et-Marne. He collaborated with the perfume company Chez Marionnaud to establish the Team Marionnaud, a show jumping team that includes his own sons, Philippe and Thierry Rozier. Charlotte Casiraghi of Monaco's Princely Family also rode for this team from 2001 to 2004 .

== Medals ==
- 1968 : Silver Medal, Mexico Olympics
- 1970 : Gold Medal, French Championships
- 1971 : Gold Medal, French Championships
- 1974 : Gold Medal, French Championships
- 1976 : Gold Medal, Montréal Olympics

== See also ==
- Quickly de Kreisker's trainer
