= Heidi Robbiani =

Swiss equestrian

Medal record

Equestrian

Representing Switzerland

Olympic Games
Bronze medal – third place	1984 Los Angeles	Individual jumping

Adelheid "Heidi" Robbiani (born 27 October 1950) is a Swiss equestrian and Olympic medalist. She competed in show jumping at the 1984 Summer Olympics in Los Angeles, where she won a bronze medal in the individual contest, and placed fifth with the Swiss team, on the Irish Sport Horse chestnut mare Jessica V.
