= Fernando Senderos =

Mexican equestrian

Personal information
- Nationality: Mexican
- Born: 3 March 1950 (age 76)

Sport
- Sport: Equestrian
Medal record
Equestrian
Representing Mexico
Pan American Games
Gold medal – first place	1975 Mexico City	Individual jumping
Silver medal – second place	1975 Mexico City	Team jumping
Bronze medal – third place	1979 San Juan	Team jumping

Fernando Senderos (born 3 March 1950) is a Mexican equestrian. He competed at the 1976 Summer Olympics and the 1984 Summer Olympics.
