= Martín Mallo =

Argentine equestrian

Personal information
- Full name: Martín Esteban Mallo
- Nationality: Argentine
- Born: 20 July 1950 (age 75)

Sport
- Sport: Equestrian

Martín Mallo (born 20 July 1950) is an Argentine equestrian. He competed in the 1976 and 1984 Summer Olympics in Equestrian Jumping where he competed in both the Individual, Open and Team, Open events
