= Conrad Homfeld =

American equestrian

Personal information
- Born: December 25, 1951 (age 74) Pinehurst, North Carolina, U.S.
Medal record
Equestrian
Representing the United States
Olympic Games
Gold medal – first place	1984 Los Angeles	Team jumping
Silver medal – second place	1984 Los Angeles	Individual jumping
World Championships
Bronze medal – third place	1978 Aachen	Team Jumping
Gold medal – first place	1986 Aachen	Team Jumping
Silver medal – second place	1986 Aachen	Individual Jumping
World Cup
Gold medal – first place	1980 Baltimore	Individual Jumping
Gold medal – first place	1985 Berlin	Individual Jumping

Conrad Homfeld (born December 25, 1951, in Pinehurst, North Carolina) is an American show jumping competitor and Olympic champion.

== Olympics ==
Homfeld qualified for the 1980 U.S. Olympic team but did not compete due to the U.S. Olympic Committee's boycott of the 1980 Summer Olympics in Moscow, Russia. He was one of 461 athletes to receive a Congressional Gold Medal instead. At the 1984 Olympic Games in Los Angeles, Homfeld won the gold medal as part of the United States team in Team jumping, with the horse Abdullah. He received a silver medal in Individual jumping. He later transitioned to a career in show jumping course design.
