= Hugh Graham (equestrian) =

Canadian equestrian (born 1949)

Personal information
- Born: 11 February 1949 (age 77) Guelph, Ontario, Canada

Sport
- Sport: Equestrian
Medal record
Equestrian
Representing Canada
Pan American Games
Gold medal – first place	1987 Indianapolis	Team jumping
Silver medal – second place	1983 Caracas	Team jumping

Hugh Graham (born 11 February 1949) is a Canadian equestrian. He competed in two events at the 1984 Summer Olympics.
