= Victor Contador =

Chilean equestrian

Personal information
- Nationality: Chilean
- Born: 26 April 1948 (age 76)

Sport
- Sport: Equestrian

Victor Contador (born 26 April 1948) is a Chilean equestrian. He competed in two events at the 1984 Summer Olympics.
