= United States Equestrian Team =

- National federation: US Equestrian
- President: Murray Kessler
- Current team sponsors: Land Rover, NetJets, Dutta Corp, Adequan

Olympic Games
- Appearances: 25
- Medals: Gold: 11 Silver: 21 Bronze: 20

The United States Equestrian Team (USET) refers to the American national teams in Olympic and non-Olympic disciplines of horse sport. US Equestrian, the governing body of horse sport in the United States, selects, trains and funds the teams. The Olympic discipline teams are: the Land Rover US Eventing Team, the Dutta Corp. US Dressage Team and the NetJets US Jumping Team. The United States also fields teams in para-dressage, combined driving, endurance, reining and vaulting. USET has a history of Olympic success, with fifty-two medals - eleven gold, twenty-one silver and twenty bronze across the three Olympic disciplines.

== History ==
In 2001, USA Equestrian and the United States Equestrian Team developed a new organization: the United States Equestrian Federation, now known as US Equestrian. US Equestrian now controls the national equestrian teams.

The most decorated American Olympic equestrians are Michael Plumb, with six medals (two gold and four silver), and Earl Foster Thomson with five (two gold and three silver).
