= Philippe Rozier =

French equestrian

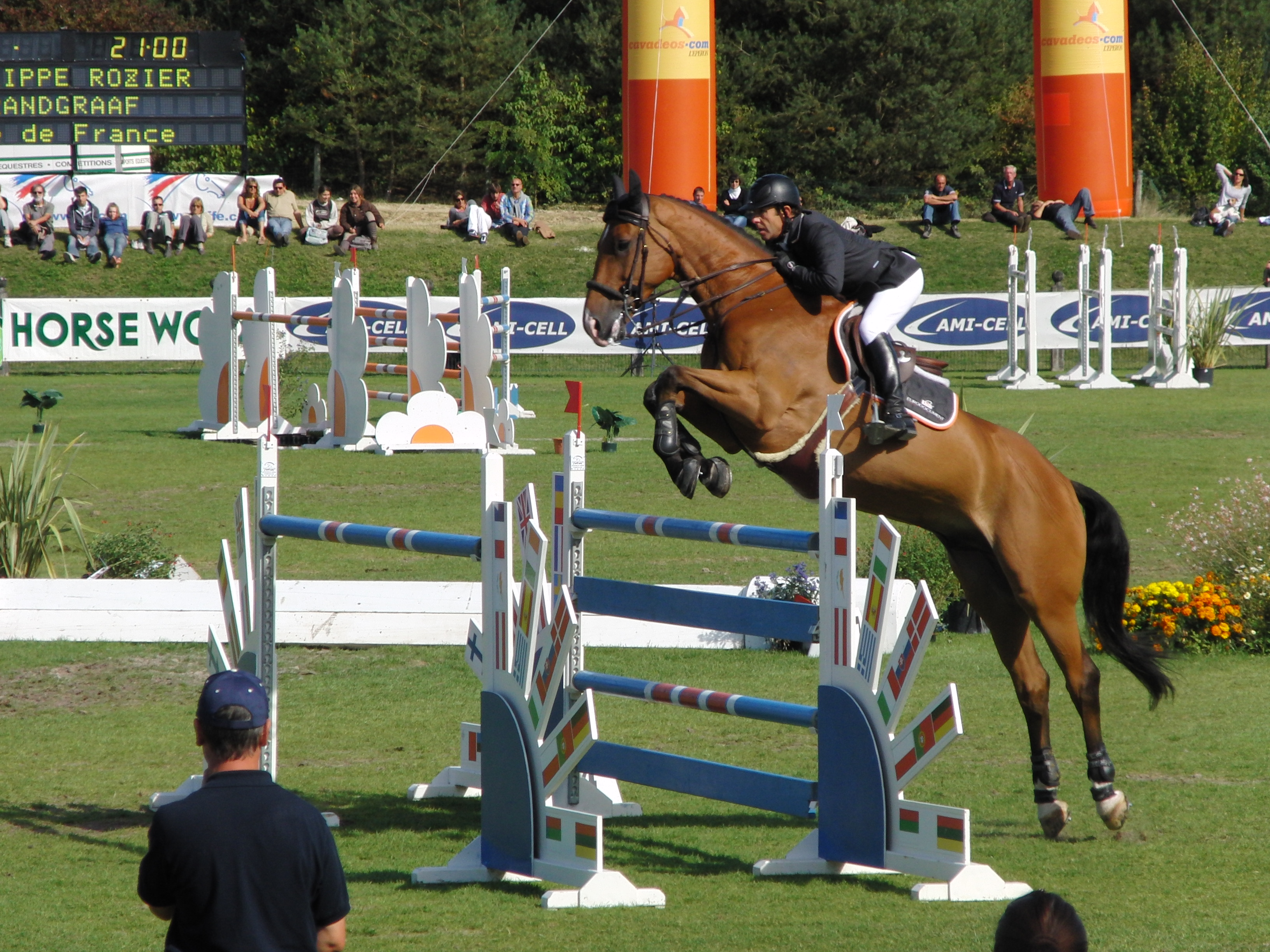
- Rozier on Randgraaf in 2010

Personal information
- Born: 5 February 1963 (age 63) Melun, Seine-et-Marne, France
- Height: 173 cm (5 ft 8 in)
- Weight: 63 kg (139 lb)

Sport
- Sport: Show jumping
- Club: Espace Marcel Rozier
Medal record
Equestrian
Representing France
Olympic Games
| Gold medal – first place | 2016 Rio de Janeiro | Team jumping |
World Equestrian Games
| Silver medal – second place | 1994 Den Haag | Team jumping |

Philippe Rozier (born 5 February 1963) is a French show jumping rider. He began riding internationally thirty years ago, beginning with a spot on the 1980 gold-medal French team at the Junior European Championships. He has won two silver medals at the world championships and ridden at 75 Nations' Cups. He competes for France in the Global Champions Tour, having supported the tour since it began in 2006.

He is the son of Marcel Rozier, also a jumping rider and trainer, who owns the prestigious Espace Rozier near Paris. He is also the brother of fellow champion rider Thierry Rozier, who has been the long-time trainer of Charlotte Casiraghi, herself an amateur rider. Philippe Rozier is sponsored by the Team Marionnaud, which is sponsored by the Chez Marionnaud perfume company.

Rozier competed in showjumping at the 1984, 2000 and 2016 Summer Olympics. In 1984 he tied for 20th place individually and helped his team take 6th place. In 2000, he tied for 21st place individually, being eliminated in the qualifying rounds, but France went on to take 4th place as a team. In 2016, he placed 23rd individually and won a gold medal with the team.

== Medals ==
- 1983 Bronze Medal, Individual, European Championships at Geesteren with the horse Cool Million,
- 1987 Silver Medal, team, European Championships at St. Gallen with Jiva
- 1989 Silver Medal, team, European Championships at Rotterdam with the horse Oscar Minotière.
- 1994 Silver Medal, team, World Equestrian Games at The Hague with the horse Rocco V
- 1997 Gold Medal, team, and 4th place, individual, at the Mediterranean Equestrian Games at Bari with the horse Flyer

== See also ==
- France at the 2000 Summer Olympics
