= 1984 Summer Olympics =

Multi-sport event in Los Angeles, California, US

Games of the XXIII Olympiad
- Location: Los Angeles, United States
- Motto: Play a Part in History
- Nations: 140
- Athletes: 6,800 (5,231 men, 1,569 women)
- Events: 221 in 21 sports (29 disciplines)
- Opening: July 28, 1984
- Closing: August 12, 1984
- Opened by: President Ronald Reagan
- Closed by: IOC President Juan Antonio Samaranch
- Cauldron: Rafer Johnson
- Stadium: Los Angeles Memorial Coliseum

The 1984 Summer Olympics (officially the Games of the XXIII Olympiad and commonly known as Los Angeles 1984) were an international multi-sport event held from July 28 to August 12, 1984, in Los Angeles, California, United States. It was the second time that Los Angeles had hosted the Games, with the first in 1932. California was the home state of the incumbent U.S. president Ronald Reagan, who officially opened the Games. These were the first Summer Olympic Games under the IOC presidency of Juan Antonio Samaranch.

The 1984 Games were boycotted by 14 Eastern Bloc countries, including the Soviet Union and East Germany, in response to the American-led boycott of the 1980 Summer Olympics in Moscow in protest at the Soviet invasion of Afghanistan; Romania was the only Soviet-aligned state that opted to attend the Games. Albania, Iran, Libya and Upper Volta also chose to boycott the Games, but for unrelated reasons.

Despite the field being depleted in certain sports due to the boycott, 140 National Olympic Committees took part in the 1984 Games, a record number at the time. The United States won the most gold and overall medals, followed by Romania and West Germany.

The 1984 Summer Olympics are widely considered to be the most financially successful modern Olympics. As a result of low construction costs, due to the use of existing sport infrastructure, coupled with a reliance on private corporate funding, the 1984 Games generated more than $200 million ($620 million in 2025) in profit.

Los Angeles will host the Summer Olympics for the third time in 2028, becoming the third city in the world—following London and Paris—to do so.

== Host selection ==
After the terrorist attack at the 1972 Summer Olympics, the significant financial debts of Montreal (1976), and various boycotts by National Olympic Committees, few cities by the late 1970s were willing to bid for the Summer Olympics. Only two cities (Tehran and Los Angeles) made serious bids for the 1984 Summer Games. Tehran submitted its bid to host the 1984 Summer Olympics to the International Olympic Committee (IOC) on 29 August 1975. The selection of the host city was made at the 80th IOC Session in Athens on 18 May 1978, where Los Angeles was chosen as the host city.

Los Angeles had unsuccessfully bid for the two previous Summer Olympic Games (1976 and 1980, which went to Montreal and Moscow, respectively). The United States Olympic Committee (USOC) had submitted at least one bid for every Olympics since 1944 but had not succeeded since the Los Angeles Olympics in 1932, the previous time only a single bid had been issued for the Summer Olympics. In 1977, the USOC selected Los Angeles over New York City to be the American candidate for the 1984 Summer Olympics in a 55–39 vote.

1984 Summer Olympics bidding results
| City | Nation | Votes |
|---|---|---|
| Los Angeles | United States | Unanimous |
| Tehran | Iran | Did not advance |

== Development and preparations ==
The Los Angeles Olympic Organizing Committee (LAOOC) was officially established on June 15, 1978, to manage the games using private funds rather than public debt. Peter Ueberroth was selected as President of the LAOOC in early 1979.

This was the first edition in which new rules of coexistence within the Olympic Village were implemented and it was decided that from this edition onwards all athletes would have to stay in the same place, as opposed to being divided by gender and sometimes even political blocs which was the case previously. Using UCLA student housing as the primary village. UCLA hosted 4,000 athletes, along with USC, it hosted swimmers and UCSB hosted the rowing teams.

LAOOC had to prepare for twenty-six competition venues. Twenty of the competition venues were existing, three were new: the Olympic Velodrome on the California State University, Dominguez Hills campus, Prado Park for shooting and the Olympic Swim Stadium on the University of Southern California campus. The Velodrome was constructed between 1981 and 1982, while the Swim Stadium was constructed between 1980 and 1983. 7-Eleven convenience stores sponsored the Velodrome, while McDonald's sponsored the Swim Stadium, though neither corporate name was mentioned in the official Olympic report. The three temporary venues were set up at Fairbanks Ranch Country Club for equestrian, Long Beach shoreline for sailing and Lake Casitas for rowing.

=== Budget ===
The Games cost a total of $546 million ($1.7 billion in 2026). The LAOOC calculated early on, it would have to make six times the revenue of previous games from sponsorship, television rights, and ticket sales. Ueberroth auctioned off sponsorship rights for each product area and required each sponsor to make a minimum contribution of $4 million as a in-kind donation to the LAOOC. For example, Coca-Cola beat out Pepsi for the soft drink sponsorship area by paying $12.6 million. When Kodak persisted in offering only half of Ueberroth's $4 million minimum for the film supply sponsorship, the LAOOC offered Fuji Film seventy-two hours to sign a contract - which resulted in a $7 million deal. These sponsorships were sold in record amounts and covered the majority of the Games' expenditures. All revenues were immediately deposited into interest bearing accounts, which due to the high interest rates of that period (in excess of 20% in 1979) yielded most of the operating budget for the LAOOC into the early 1980s.

=== Security ===
At the time, the largest local and federal security force was assembled due to prior Olympic games security failures, primarily the events in Munich. The Los Angeles Police Department, federal agents and thousands of temporary security agents were tasked to provide safety at each event. Security was the most expensive item on the budget. LAOOC provided $35 million and the federal government provided $50 million each. The rest was covered by the city and state government. The California Highway Patrol was responsible for the security of visiting dignitaries, including President Ronald Reagan. Security planning was marred by unresolved disputes between the FBI and the Los Angeles Police Department, both of which claimed the right to take lead control in case of an incident. No major incident took place.

=== Transportation ===
Los Angeles County's SCRTD was tasked to coordinate games movement, including transporting the "olympic family" of athletes, coaches, officials and media. Totaling over 25,000 persons. SCRTD was operating the nation's largest all-bus system in the 1980s. LAOOC and SCRTD coordinated a 550 special olympic bus fleet, including 24 shuttle services, dedicated express lanes and multiple park-and-ride routes. Los Angeles had no public rail transit in 1984, the red car Pacific Electric rail network, the largest in the world, was dismantled by 1963.

City leaders advised Angelenos to opt out of driving during the games or alter their driving habits and work hours. Los Angeles Mayor Tom Bradley and LAOOC prepared an advertising informational campaign push called, "Take the Bus". Bus schedules were provided to early bird ticket buyers to provide options on transportation to events. During the games, more than 1 million boarding passengers heeded his message. Predictions of gridlock and heavy smog never materialized.

=== Venues ===
The Los Angeles Memorial Coliseum (pictured in 2025) hosted track and field events, as well as ceremonies

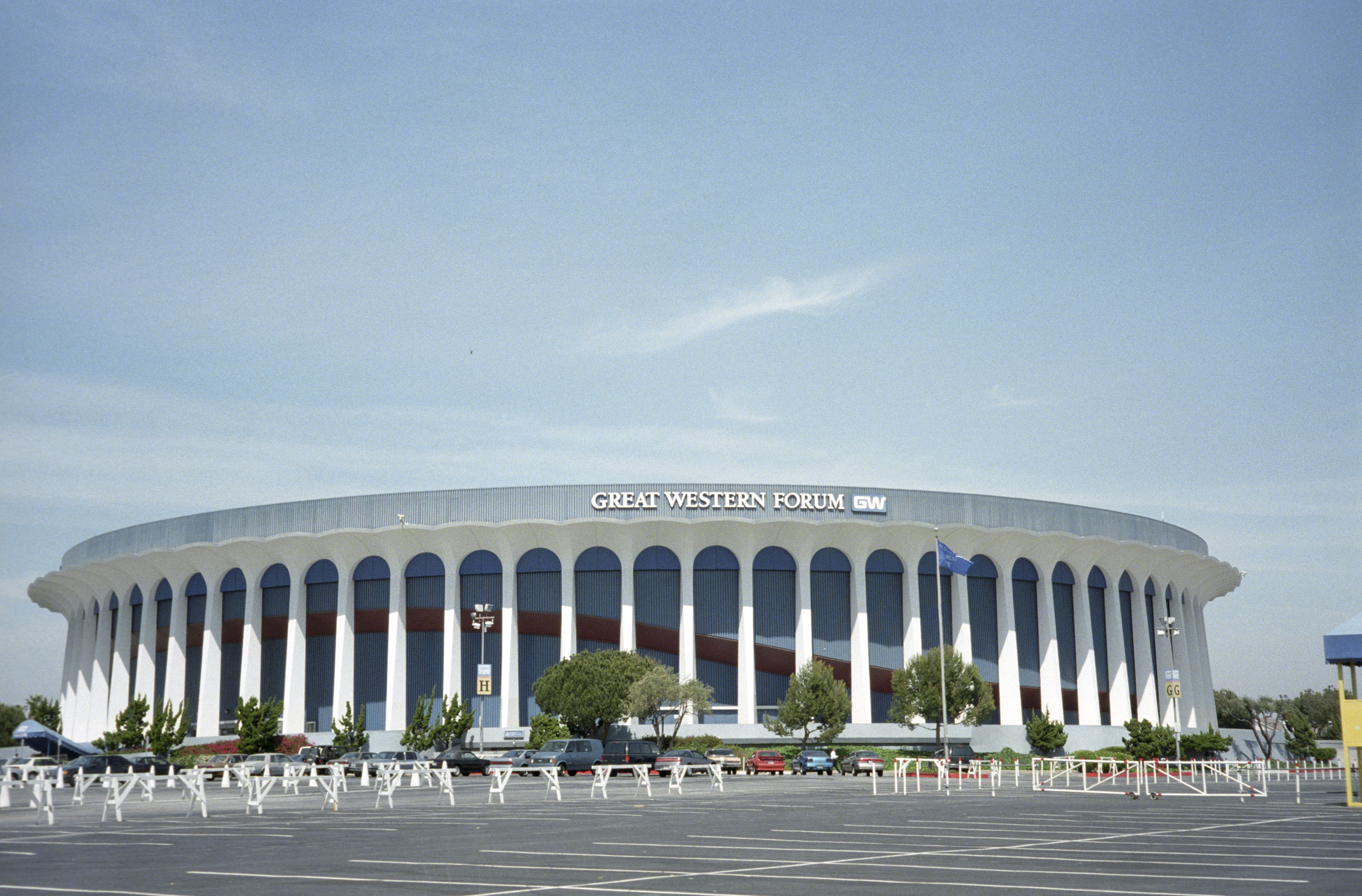
The Forum hosted the basketball events

==== Venues in the city of Los Angeles ====
- Los Angeles Memorial Coliseum – opening/closing ceremonies, athletics
- Los Angeles Memorial Sports Arena – boxing
- Dodger Stadium – baseball
- Pauley Pavilion, University of California, Los Angeles – gymnastics
- Eagle's Nest Arena, California State University, Los Angeles – judo
- Olympic Swim Stadium, University of Southern California – swimming, diving, synchronized swimming
- Olympic Village (athlete housing), University of Southern California
- Los Angeles Tennis Center, University of California, Los Angeles – tennis
- Athletes Village, University of California, Los Angeles
- Albert Gersten Pavilion, Loyola Marymount University, Westchester, California – weightlifting
- Streets of Los Angeles – athletics (marathon)

==== Venues in Southern California ====
- El Dorado Park, Long Beach, California – archery
- The Forum, Inglewood, California – basketball and team handball finals
- Lake Casitas, Ventura County, California – canoeing, rowing
- Olympic Velodrome, California State University, Dominguez Hills, Carson, California – cycling (track)
- Mission Viejo, Orange County, California – cycling (individual road race)
- Santa Anita Park, Arcadia, California – equestrian
- Fairbanks Ranch Country Club, Rancho Santa Fe, California, California – equestrian sports (eventing endurance)
- Long Beach Convention Center, Long Beach, California – fencing
- Rose Bowl, Pasadena, California – football (final)
- Titan Gymnasium, California State University, Fullerton, Fullerton, California – handball
- Weingart Stadium, East Los Angeles College, Monterey Park, California – field hockey
- Coto de Caza, Orange County, California – modern pentathlon (fencing, riding, running, shooting)
- Olympic Shooting Range, Prado Recreational Area, Chino, California – shooting
- Long Beach Arena, Long Beach, California – volleyball
- Raleigh Runnels Memorial Pool, Pepperdine University, Malibu, California – water polo
- Anaheim Convention Center, Anaheim, California – wrestling
- Long Beach Shoreline Marina, Long Beach, California – sailing
- Artesia Freeway – cycling (road team time trial)
- Heritage Park Aquatic Center, Irvine, California – modern pentathlon (swimming)
- Santa Monica College, Santa Monica, California – athletics (marathon start)
- Santa Monica, California – athletics (marathon)

==== Other venues ====
- Harvard Stadium, Harvard University, Boston, Massachusetts – football preliminaries
- Navy–Marine Corps Memorial Stadium, United States Naval Academy, Annapolis, Maryland – football preliminaries
- Stanford Stadium, Stanford University, Stanford, California – football preliminaries

=== Olympic Arts Festival ===
The 1984 Summer Olympics was preceded by the 10-week-long adjunct Olympic Arts Festival or the Cultural Olympics, which opened on June 1 and ended on August 12. It provided more than 400 performances by 146 theater, dance, and music companies, representing every continent and 18 countries, as well as art exhibitions and films. It was organized by then-CalArts President Robert Fitzpatrick. Along with many famous American dance companies, such as the Dance Theatre of Harlem, the festival hosted three international debuts: German choreographer Pina Bausch and her Tanztheater Wuppertal, Groupe Emile Dubois from France, and the Japanese Butoh.

Local Los Angeles artist Rodolfo Escalera was commissioned to create nine paintings depicting the Summer Games that would later be turned into collectible plates and presented as "The Official Gift of the 1984 Olympics".

LAOOC also designated Ernie Barnes as "Sports Artist of the 1984 Summer Olympic Games" and Barnes was commissioned to create five Olympic-themed paintings and serve as an official Olympic spokesman to encourage inner-city youth.

=== Olympic Music ===
"Olympic Fanfare and Theme"
composed by John Williams for the 1984 Summer Olympics in Los Angeles and performed by the Boston Pops Orchestra

John Williams composed the theme for the Olympiad, "Los Angeles Olympic Theme" later also known as "Olympic Fanfare and Theme". This piece won a Grammy for Williams and became one of the most well-known musical themes of the Olympic Games, along with Leo Arnaud's "Bugler's Dream"; the latter is sometimes attached to the beginning of Olympic Fanfare and Theme.

Composer Bill Conti also wrote a song to inspire the weightlifters called "Power".

An album, The Official Music of the XXIII Olympiad—Los Angeles 1984, featured tracks with sports themes written for the occasion by popular musical artists including Foreigner, Toto, Loverboy, Herbie Hancock, Quincy Jones, Christopher Cross, Philip Glass, Paul Engemann and Giorgio Moroder. "Reach Out" was the main soundtrack and is the official theme song of the 1984 Summer Olympics.

The Brazilian composer Sérgio Mendes produced a special song for the 1984 Olympic Games, "Olympia," from his 1984 album Confetti. A choir of approximately one thousand voices was assembled of singers in the region. All were volunteers from nearby churches, schools and universities.

Pop-punk band Bowling for Soup references the games in the song "I Can't Stand LA". During a section showing appreciation for the city, the song states, "thank you for hair metal and the '84 Olympics."

In the same week that the Games began, British pop star Howard Jones released a single called "Like to Get to Know You Well" which eventually made number 4 on the UK Singles Chart and number 49 on the Billboard Hot 100 in the United States. On the sleeve, the record was "dedicated to the original spirit of the Olympic Games".

=== Torch relay ===
The 1984 Olympic Torch Relay began in New York City and ended in Los Angeles, traversing 33 states and the District of Columbia. Unlike later torch relays, the torch was continuously carried by runners on foot. The route covered more than 9,320 mi (15,000 km) and involved 3,636 runners. The cross country relay raised $10.31 million for charity (about $33 million in 2026). Gina Hemphill, a granddaughter of Jesse Owens, carried the torch into the Coliseum, completed a lap around the track, then handed it off to the final runner, Rafer Johnson, winner of the decathlon at the 1960 Summer Olympics. With the torch, he touched off the flame which passed through a specially designed flammable Olympic rings. Johnson became the first person of African descent to light the cauldron in Olympic history. The flame then passed up to the cauldron atop the peristyle and remained aflame for the duration of the Games.

=== Tickets ===
Tickets were initially sold through an early access mail-in order form, lottery-style system on June 20, 1983. Sears, Manufacturers Hanover Corporation and First Interstate Bank provided mail-in order forms and brochures to the public. Sears was a major distributor with 3,300 stores throughout the US. Ticket management and advertisement was run by IMG. Tickets sales in Southern California were sold separately.

A total of 6.8 million tickets went on sale to the public with prices ranging from $3 to $95. Opening and closing ceremonies ranged from $50, $100 and $200 per ticket. A record 5.7 million tickets were sold, or 83% of capacity. The remaining tickets were sold to "olympic family" members, sponsors or sold to corporations.

== Marketing ==
=== Emblem ===
Official poster of the 1984 Summer Olympics

The emblem was designed by local design firm Robert Miles Runyan & Associates unveiled on August 4, 1980. The "Stars and Motion" features three red, white, and blue stars representing first, second, and third place, intertwined with 13 horizontal stripes to convey speed and American pride.

=== Branding ===
The "Look of the Games," was designed by Jon Jerde and Deborah Sussman of Sussman/Prejza & Co. They designed an aesthetic known as "festive federalism".

Sussman created an eleven-color palette scheme for the games. It utilized bright, unconventional colors combined with geometric shapes, stars, and banners to create a celebratory, cost-effective, and a unified visual identity across distant city venues. Colors were chosen to represent the "California spirit", Latin-American influences in LA and Mediterranean influences in the Olympic movement, primarily Greece. The main color was Magenta, with accented:

- Chrome yellow,
- Aqua,
- Vermilion,
- Light blue,
- Green,
- Lavender,
- Informational yellow,
- Pink,
- Dark blue,
- Violet.

The 1984 Games were the first to use colorful themed graphics at every venue and field of play. The term “Look of the Games” came into common usage as a result of Los Angeles’ innovative design program.

=== Mascot ===
The mascot was a bald eagle named Sam the Olympic Eagle.

=== Corporate sponsorship ===
LAOOC utilized a "free-enterprise" model, featuring 34 exclusive corporate sponsors that contributed over $126 million ($430 million in 2026), marking a shift toward high-stakes sponsorship. Sponsors, licensees, and suppliers were allowed to use the Olympics star-in-motion logo, the interlocking-rings symbol, and the official mascot.

The marketing team rounded up 64 suppliers, and 65 licensees. They also created hospitality centers, introducing the concept for the first time. Official licensees handed over 10% in royalties on sales, and official suppliers provided the materials needed to run the games. Sears withdrew from being an official sponsor but was still granted rights to distribute forms applications at Sears stores nationwide as a partner, selling tickets to the games. Manufacturers Hanover also was not official but distributed tickets, in the New York City area.

For television rights, ABC bid against CBS and NBC for the US rights to broadcast the games, they agreed to pay a total of $225 million. Under the terms of the agreement, ABC paid $100 million for the basic rights to the games, of which one third went to the IOC, and two thirds went to the LAOOC. The remainder $125 million went to the LAOOC for special transmission facilities, venue lighting and other venue equipment required for the broadcasts.

Sponsors of the 1984 Summer Olympics
Key official sponsors tier:
- American Express (credit card)
- Anheuser-Busch (official beer)
- Arrowhead Water (official water)
- Budget (official car rental)
- Canon USA (official camera)
- Champion (official sportswear)
- Coca-Cola (official soft-drink)
  - Sprite, TAB, Diet Coke
- Converse (official footwear)
- First Interstate Bank (official bank)
- Fuji Film (official film)
- Gal Plastics, Inc. (souvenir bags)
- IBM
- Kraft
- Levi's (official outfitter)
- Longines (official timekeeper)
- M&M's/Mars Inc. (official snack foods)
- McDonald’s (official fast-food)
- Pacific Bell (official tele-communications)
- Perrier (official mineral water)
- Sanyo (official video products)
- SP Logistics
- United Airlines (official airline)
- Vuarnet (official sunglasses)
Sponsors/partners/suppliers/licensees
- 7-Eleven (sponsor of new velodrome)
- ABC (official broadcaster)
- ARA services (official food services)
- AT&T (official sponsor of torch relay)
- ARCO (sponsor of new track at Coliseum)
- Buick (official automobile)
- Manufacturers Hanover (official ticket distribution)
- Motorola (official radio communications)
- Times Mirror (official sponsor of art festival)
- Transamerica (official insurance)
- Sears (official ticket distribution)
- Vidal Sassoon (official hair products/cuts)
- Xerox (official copier and facsimile provider)

== Participating National Olympic Committees ==
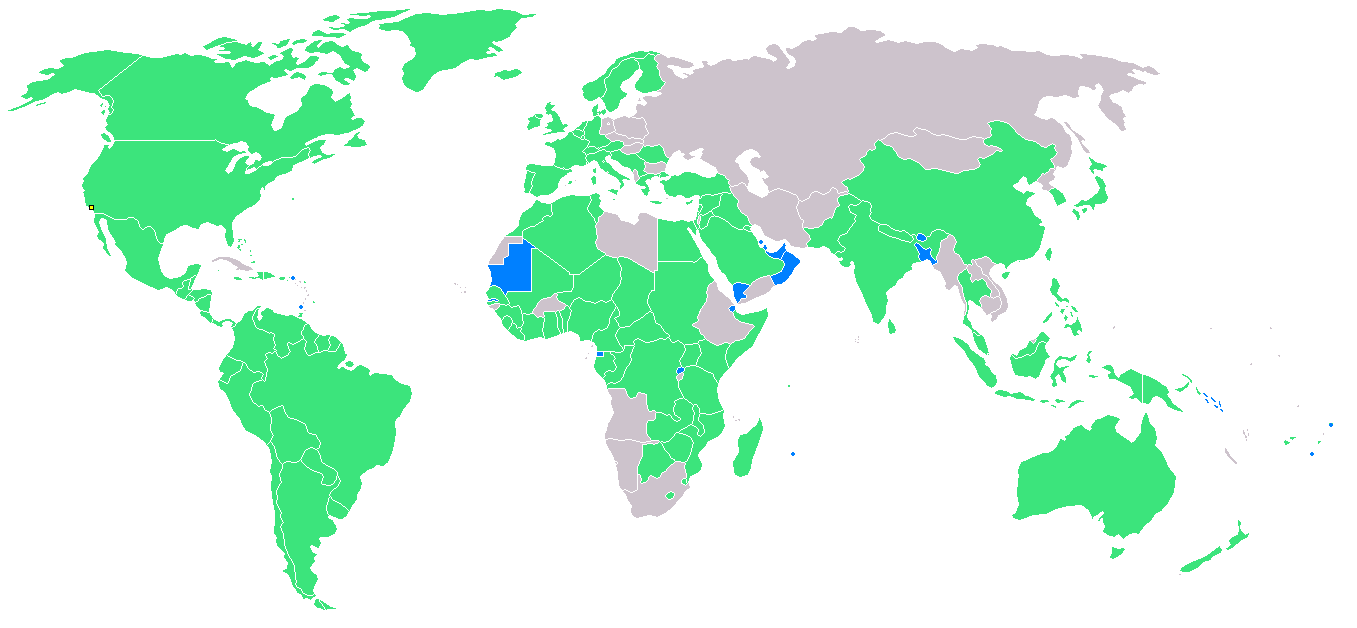
Participating states

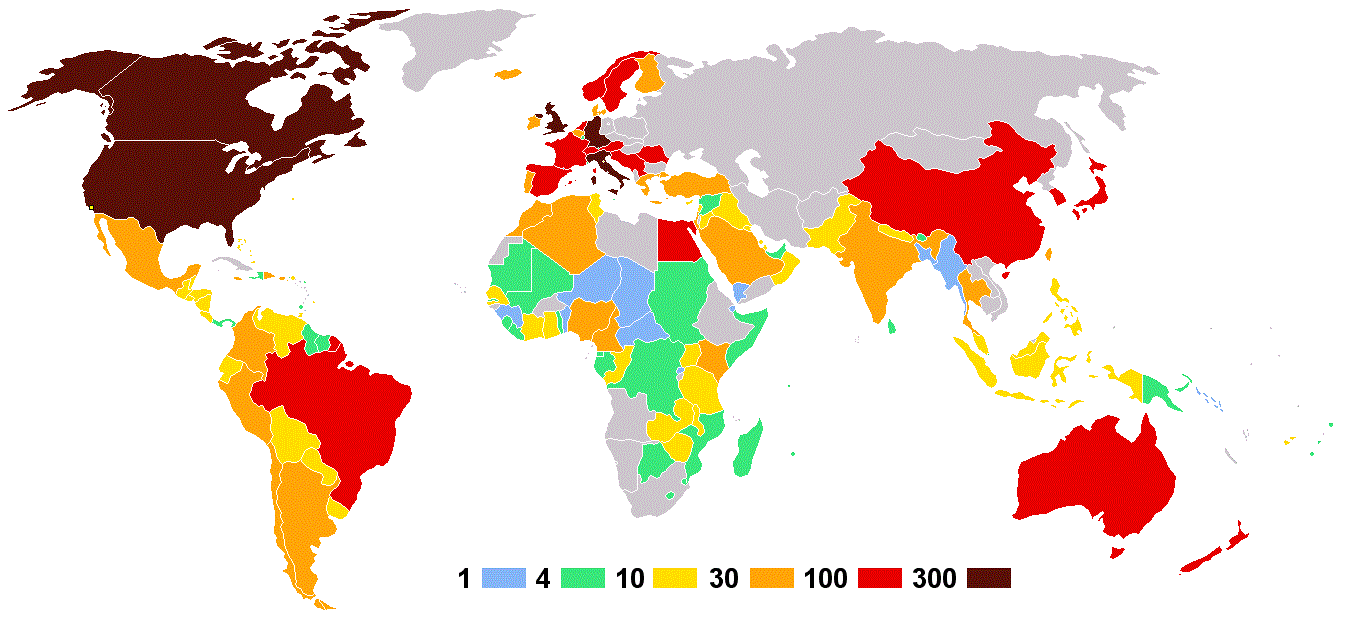
Number of athletes

Athletes from 140 states competed at the 1984 Summer Olympics. Eighteen states made their Olympic debut: Bahrain, Bangladesh, Bhutan, British Virgin Islands, Djibouti, Equatorial Guinea, The Gambia, Grenada, Mauritania, Mauritius, North Yemen, Oman, Qatar, Rwanda, Western Samoa, Solomon Islands, Tonga, and the United Arab Emirates. Zaire had previously competed at the 1968 Summer Olympics as Congo-Kinshasa. The People's Republic of China made its first appearance in a Summer Olympics since 1952, while for the first time the Republic of China team participated under the politically contrived name of Chinese Taipei.

As a result of the Nagoya Resolution signed in 1979, and the designating the Republic of China (Taiwan) as Chinese Taipei, the People's Republic of China returned to the Summer Olympics for the first time since Helsinki 1952. The Military anthem of China was played for both teams during the opening ceremony.

The Soviet Union led the Warsaw Pact members and other Communist countries in a boycott of the Los Angeles Olympics, in retaliation for the U.S.-led boycott of the Moscow Olympics four years earlier (over the Soviet Union's invasion of Afghanistan in 1979). The pretexts for the 1984 Soviet-led boycott were concerns over security, "chauvinistic sentiments" and "an anti-Soviet hysteria ... being whipped up" in the United States. However, a handful of communist countries disregarded the boycott and attended the Games anyway, among them Yugoslavia (host of the 1984 Winter Olympics), the People's Republic of China, and Romania (the only Warsaw Pact country that had opted to ignore the Soviet demands). The Romanian team received a particularly warm reception from the United States; when the Romanian athletes entered during the opening ceremonies, they were greeted by a standing ovation from the spectators, who were mostly U.S. citizens. This would turn out to be Romania's most successful Olympic Games – they won 53 medals, including 20 golds.

Participating National Olympic Committees
- Algeria (33 athletes)
- Andorra (2)
- Antigua and Barbuda (14)
- Argentina (81)
- Australia (242)
- Austria (103)
- Bahamas (22)
- Bahrain (10)
- Bangladesh (1)
- Barbados (16)
- Belgium (63)
- Belize (11)
- Benin (3)
- Bermuda (12)
- Bhutan (6)
- Bolivia (11)
- Botswana (7)
- Brazil (147)
- British Virgin Islands (9)
- Burma (1)
- Cameroon (46)
- Canada (408)
- Cayman Islands (8)
- Central African Republic (3)
- Chad (3)
- Chile (52)
- China (215)
- Colombia (39)
- Republic of the Congo (9)
- Costa Rica (28)
- Cyprus (10)
- Denmark (60)
- Djibouti (3)
- Dominican Republic (19)
- Ecuador (11)
- Egypt (114)
- El Salvador (10)
- Equatorial Guinea (4)
- Fiji (14)
- Finland (86)
- France (238)
- Gabon (4)
- The Gambia (10)
- West Germany (391)
- Ghana (21)
- Great Britain (337)
- Greece (63)
- Grenada (6)
- Guatemala (24)
- Guinea (1)
- Guyana (10)
- Haiti (3)
- Honduras (10)
- Hong Kong (47)
- Iceland (30)
- India (48)
- Indonesia (16)
- Iraq (23)
- Ireland (42)
- Israel (32)
- Italy (268)
- Ivory Coast (15)
- Jamaica (45)
- Japan (226)
- Jordan (13)
- Kenya (61)
- South Korea (175)
- Kuwait (23)
- Lebanon (22)
- Lesotho (4)
- Liberia (7)
- Liechtenstein (7)
- Luxembourg (5)
- Madagascar (5)
- Malawi (15)
- Malaysia (21)
- Mali (4)
- Malta (7)
- Mauritania (2)
- Mauritius (4)
- Mexico (99)
- Monaco (8)
- Morocco (34)
- Mozambique (9)
- Nepal (10)
- Netherlands (136)
- Netherlands Antilles (8)
- New Zealand (130)
- Nicaragua (5)
- Niger (4)
- Nigeria (32)
- Norway (103)
- Oman (16)
- Pakistan (31)
- Panama (8)
- Papua New Guinea (7)
- Paraguay (14)
- Peru (35)
- Philippines (19)
- Portugal (38)
- Puerto Rico (51)
- Qatar (24)
- Romania (124)
- Rwanda (3)
- San Marino (19)
- Saudi Arabia (37)
- Senegal (24)
- Seychelles (9)
- Sierra Leone (7)
- Singapore (5)
- Solomon Islands (3)
- Somalia (7)
- Spain (179)
- Sri Lanka (4)
- Sudan (7)
- Suriname (5)
- Swaziland (8)
- Sweden (174)
- Switzerland (129)
- Syria (9)
- Chinese Taipei (38)
- Tanzania (18)
- Thailand (35)
- Togo (6)
- Tonga (7)
- Trinidad and Tobago (16)
- Tunisia (23)
- Turkey (46)
- Uganda (26)
- United Arab Emirates (7)
- United States (522) (host)
- Uruguay (18)
- Venezuela (26)
- Virgin Islands (29)
- Western Samoa (8)
- North Yemen (2)
- Yugoslavia (139)
- Zaire (8)
- Zambia (16)
- Zimbabwe (15)

=== Number of athletes by National Olympic Committees ===
In the table below, the number of athletes representing each state is shown in parentheses. 6,829 athletes took part in the Games.

| IOC Letter Code | Country | Athletes |
|---|---|---|
| USA | United States | 522 |
| CAN | Canada | 408 |
| FRG | West Germany | 391 |
| GBR | Great Britain | 337 |
| ITA | Italy | 268 |
| AUS | Australia | 242 |
| FRA | France | 238 |
| JPN | Japan | 226 |
| CHN | China | 215 |
| ESP | Spain | 179 |
| KOR | South Korea | 175 |
| SWE | Sweden | 174 |
| BRA | Brazil | 147 |
| YUG | Yugoslavia | 139 |
| HOL | Netherlands | 136 |
| NZL | New Zealand | 130 |
| SUI | Switzerland | 129 |
| ROM | Romania | 124 |
| EGY | Egypt | 114 |
| AUT | Austria | 103 |
| NOR | Norway | 103 |
| MEX | Mexico | 99 |
| FIN | Finland | 86 |
| ARG | Argentina | 81 |
| BEL | Belgium | 63 |
| GRE | Greece | 63 |
| KEN | Kenya | 61 |
| DEN | Denmark | 60 |
| CHI | Chile | 52 |
| PUR | Puerto Rico | 51 |
| IND | India | 48 |
| HKG | Hong Kong | 47 |
| CMR | Cameroon | 46 |
| TUR | Turkey | 46 |
| JAM | Jamaica | 45 |
| IRL | Ireland | 42 |
| COL | Colombia | 39 |
| POR | Portugal | 38 |
| TPE | Chinese Taipei | 38 |
| SAU | Saudi Arabia | 37 |
| PER | Peru | 35 |
| THA | Thailand | 35 |
| MAR | Morocco | 34 |
| ALG | Algeria | 33 |
| ISR | Israel | 32 |
| NGR | Nigeria | 32 |
| PAK | Pakistan | 31 |
| ISL | Iceland | 30 |
| ISV | Virgin Islands | 29 |
| CRC | Costa Rica | 28 |
| UGA | Uganda | 26 |
| VEN | Venezuela | 26 |
| GUA | Guatemala | 24 |
| QAT | Qatar | 24 |
| SEN | Senegal | 24 |
| IRQ | Iraq | 23 |
| KUW | Kuwait | 23 |
| TUN | Tunisia | 23 |
| BAH | Bahamas | 22 |
| LIB | Lebanon | 22 |
| GHA | Ghana | 21 |
| MAS | Malaysia | 21 |
| DOM | Dominican Republic | 19 |
| PHI | Philippines | 19 |
| SMR | San Marino | 19 |
| TAN | Tanzania | 18 |
| URU | Uruguay | 18 |
| BAR | Barbados | 16 |
| INA | Indonesia | 16 |
| OMA | Oman | 16 |
| TRI | Trinidad and Tobago | 16 |
| ZAM | Zambia | 16 |
| CIV | Ivory Coast | 15 |
| MAW | Malawi | 15 |
| ZIM | Zimbabwe | 15 |
| ANT | Antigua and Barbuda | 14 |
| FIJ | Fiji | 14 |
| PAR | Paraguay | 14 |
| JOR | Jordan | 13 |
| BER | Bermuda | 12 |
| BIZ | Belize | 11 |
| BOL | Bolivia | 11 |
| ECU | Ecuador | 11 |
| BRN | Bahrain | 10 |
| CYP | Cyprus | 10 |
| ESA | El Salvador | 10 |
| GAM | The Gambia | 10 |
| GUY | Guyana | 10 |
| HON | Honduras | 10 |
| NEP | Nepal | 10 |
| IVB | British Virgin Islands | 9 |
| CGO | Republic of the Congo | 9 |
| MOZ | Mozambique | 9 |
| SEY | Seychelles | 9 |
| SYR | Syria | 9 |
| CAY | Cayman Islands | 8 |
| MON | Monaco | 8 |
| AHO | Netherlands Antilles | 8 |
| PAN | Panama | 8 |
| SWZ | Swaziland | 8 |
| WSM | Western Samoa | 8 |
| ZAI | Zaire | 8 |
| BOT | Botswana | 7 |
| LBR | Liberia | 7 |
| LIE | Liechtenstein | 7 |
| MLT | Malta | 7 |
| NGU | Papua New Guinea | 7 |
| SLE | Sierra Leone | 7 |
| SOM | Somalia | 7 |
| SUD | Sudan | 7 |
| TON | Tonga | 7 |
| UAE | United Arab Emirates | 7 |
| BHU | Bhutan | 6 |
| GRN | Grenada | 6 |
| TOG | Togo | 6 |
| LUX | Luxembourg | 5 |
| MAD | Madagascar | 5 |
| NCA | Nicaragua | 5 |
| SIN | Singapore | 5 |
| SUR | Suriname | 5 |
| GEQ | Equatorial Guinea | 4 |
| GAB | Gabon | 4 |
| LES | Lesotho | 4 |
| MLI | Mali | 4 |
| MRI | Mauritius | 4 |
| NIG | Niger | 4 |
| SRI | Sri Lanka | 4 |
| BEN | Benin | 3 |
| CAF | Central African Republic | 3 |
| CHA | Chad | 3 |
| DJI | Djibouti | 3 |
| HAI | Haiti | 3 |
| RWA | Rwanda | 3 |
| SOL | Solomon Islands | 3 |
| AND | Andorra | 2 |
| MTN | Mauritania | 2 |
| YAR | North Yemen | 2 |
| BAN | Bangladesh | 1 |
| BIR | Burma | 1 |
| GUI | Guinea | 1 |
| Total | | 6,800 |

=== Boycotting countries ===
The 15 Eastern Bloc nations which boycotted the 1984 Games are shaded blue; the 4 non-Eastern Bloc nations that boycotted are shaded teal.

Fifteen countries took part in the Soviet-led boycott of the 1984 Summer Olympics:

- Afghanistan
- Angola
- Bulgaria
- Cuba
- Czechoslovakia
- East Germany
- Ethiopia
- Hungary
- Laos
- Mongolia
- North Korea
- Poland
- Soviet Union
- South Yemen
- Vietnam

Albania, Iran, Libya and Upper Volta (changed to Burkina Faso following August 4) also missed the Los Angeles Olympics, citing political reasons, but these countries were not a part of the Soviet-led boycott. Albania, Iran and Upper Volta were the only three countries to boycott both the 1980 and 1984 Summer Games.

- Albania
- Iran
- Libya
- / Upper Volta/Burkina Faso

=== Soviet doping plan ===
A document obtained in 2016 by The New York Times revealed the Soviet Union's plans for a statewide doping system in track and field in preparation for the 1984 Summer Olympics in Los Angeles. Dated prior to the country's decision to boycott the Games, the document detailed existing steroids operations of the program, along with suggestions for further enhancements.

== Calendar ==
All times are in Pacific Daylight Time (UTC-7); the other two cities, Boston and Annapolis use Eastern Daylight Time (UTC-4)

| ● | Opening ceremony | Event competitions | ● | Event finals | ● | Closing ceremony |

| Date | July | | | | August | | | | | | | | | | | |
| Date | 28th Sat | 29th Sun | 30th Mon | 31st Tue | 1st Wed | 2nd Thu | 3rd Fri | 4th Sat | 5th Sun | 6th Mon | 7th Tue | 8th Wed | 9th Thu | 10th Fri | 11th Sat | 12th Sun |
|---|---|---|---|---|---|---|---|---|---|---|---|---|---|---|---|---|
| Archery | | | | | | | | | | | | | | | ● ● | |
| Athletics | | | | | | | ● ● | ● ● ● | ● ● ● ● | ● ● ● ● ● ● ● ● | | ● ● ● ● | ● ● ● | ● ● ● ● ● | ● ● ● ● ● ● ● ● ● ● ● | ● |
| Basketball | | | | | | | | | | | ● | | | ● | | |
| Boxing | | | | | | | | | | | | | | | ● ● ● ● ● ● ● ● ● ● ● ● | |
| Canoeing | | | | | | | | | | | | | | ● ● ● ● ● ● | ● ● ● ● ● ● | |
| Cycling | | ● ● | ● | | ● | | ● ● ● | | ● | | | | | | | |
| Diving | | | | | | | | | | ● | | ● | | ● | | ● |
| Equestrian | | | | | | | ● ● | | | | ● | | ● | ● | | ● |
| Fencing | | | | | | ● | ● | ● | ● | | ● | ● | ● | | ● | |
| Field hockey | | | | | | | | | | | | | | ● | ● | |
| Football | | | | | | | | | | | | | | | ● | |
| Gymnastics | | | | ● | ● | ● | ● | ● ● ● ● ● ● | ● ● ● ● | | | | | | ● | |
| Handball | | | | | | | | | | | | | ● | | ● | |
| Judo | | | | | | | | ● | ● | ● | ● | ● | ● | ● | ● | |
| Modern pentathlon | | | | | ● ● | | | | | | | | | | | |
| Rowing | | | | | | | | ● ● ● ● ● ● | ● ● ● ● ● ● ● ● | | | | | | | |
| Sailing | | | | | | | | | | | | ● ● ● ● ● ● ● | | | | |
| Shooting | | ● ● | ● | ● ● ● | ● | ● | ● ● | ● | | | | | | | | |
| Swimming | | ● ● ● ● | ● ● ● ● ● | ● ● ● ● ● | | ● ● ● ● ● | ● ● ● ● ● | ● ● ● ● ● | | | | | | | | |
| Synchronized swimming | | | | | | | | | | | | | ● | | | ● |
| Volleyball | | | | | | | | | | | ● | | | | ● | |
| Water polo | | | | | | | | | | | | | | ● | | |
| Weightlifting | | ● | ● | ● | ● | ● | | ● | ● | ● | ● | ● | | | | |
| Wrestling | | | | | ● ● ● | ● ● ● | ● ● ● ● | | | | | | ● ● ● | ● ● ● | ● ● ● ● | |
| Total gold medals | | 9 | 8 | 13 | 10 | 12 | 16 | 24 | 21 | 10 | 5 | 14 | 11 | 20 | 43 | 4 |
| Ceremonies | ● | | | | | | | | | | | | | | | ● |
| Date | 28th Sat | 29th Sun | 30th Mon | 31st Tue | 1st Wed | 2nd Thu | 3rd Fri | 4th Sat | 5th Sun | 6th Mon | 7th Tue | 8th Wed | 9th Thu | 10th Fri | 11th Sat | 12th Sun |
| Date | July | | | | August | | | | | | | | | | | |

== The Games ==
=== Ceremonies ===
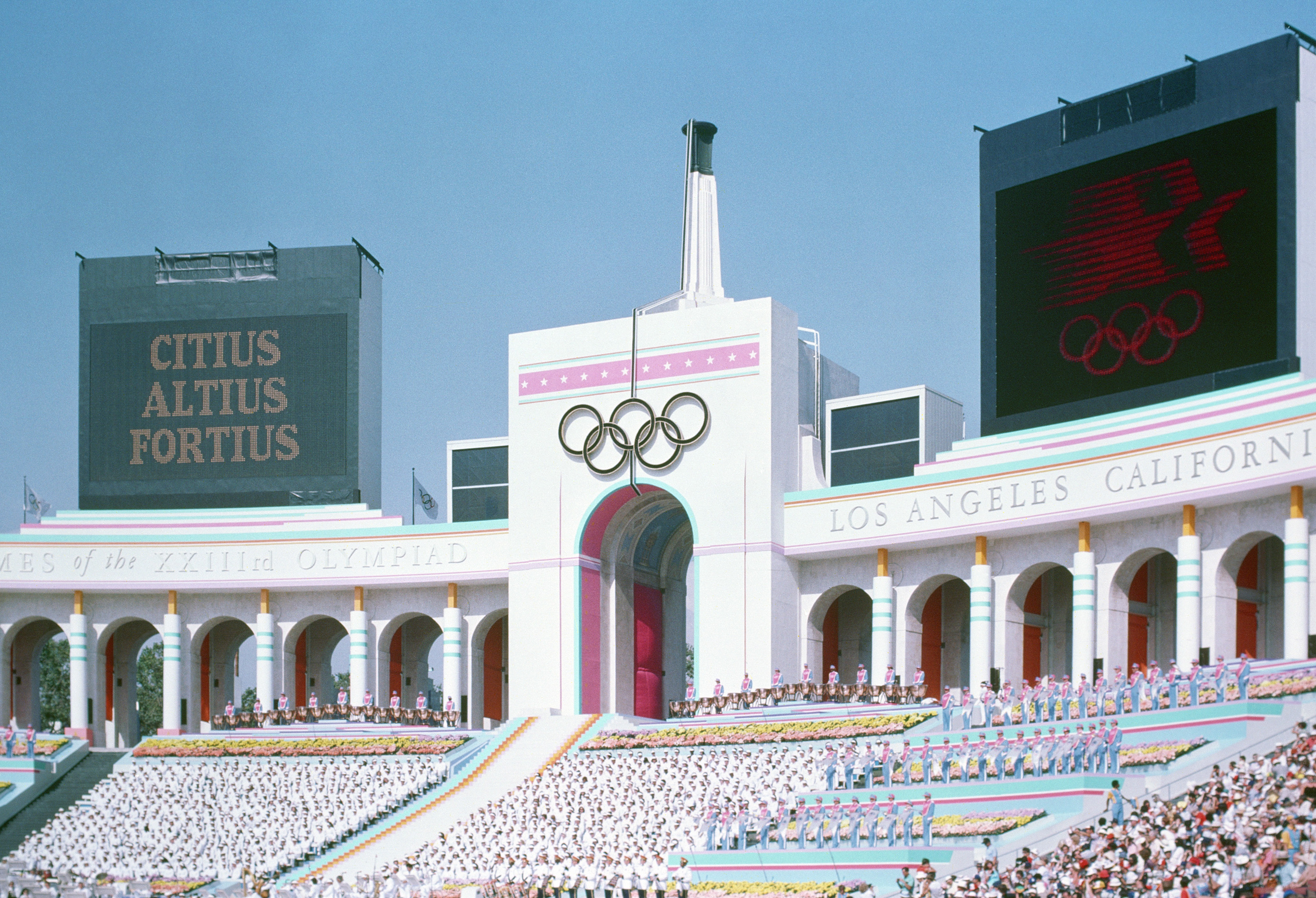
The Opening Ceremony at the Los Angeles Memorial Coliseum

For the first time in history, the International Olympic Committee authorized the formal segments of the opening ceremony to be interspersed with the cultural segments.

The start of the event featured the arrival of Bill Suitor by means of the Bell Aerosystems rocket pack (also known as a Jet Pack).

Etta James performed "When the Saints Go Marching In" at the opening ceremony.

Alongside Williams and the house orchestra, 84 pianists performed an abridged version of George Gershwin's composition Rhapsody in Blue.

Vicki McClure, along with the International Children's Choir of Long Beach, sang "Reach Out and Touch".

Lionel Richie performed a special extended 9-minute version of his hit single "All Night Long" at the closing ceremonies.

=== Sports ===
The 1984 Summer Olympic program featured 221 events in the following 21 sports:

- Aquatics
  - Diving (4)
  - Swimming (29)
  - Synchronized swimming (2)
  - Water polo (1)
- Archery (2)
- Athletics (41)
- Basketball (2)
- Boxing (12)
- Canoeing (12)
- Cycling
  - Road (3)
  - Track (5)
- Equestrian
  - Dressage (2)
  - Eventing (2)
  - Show jumping (2)
- Fencing (8)
- Field hockey (2)
- Football (1)
- Gymnastics
  - Artistic (14)
  - Rhythmic (1)
- Handball (2)
- Judo (8)
- Modern pentathlon (2)
- Rowing (14)
- Sailing (7)
- Shooting (11)
- Volleyball (2)
- Weightlifting (10)
- Wrestling
  - Freestyle (10)
  - Greco-Roman (10)

=== Demonstration sports ===
- Baseball (16)
- Tennis (4)

=== Athletic Achievements ===
- Carl Lewis of the United States, making his first of four appearances at the Olympics, equaled the 1936 performance of Jesse Owens by winning four gold medals, in the 100 m, 200 m, 4 × 100 m relay and long jump.
- Edwin Moses of the United States won the gold medal in the 400m hurdles 8 years after winning in 1976.
- Joaquim Cruz of Brazil won the 800 meter run with a time of 1:43.00 to set an Olympic record.
- Nawal El Moutawakel of Morocco became the first female Olympic champion of a Muslim nation—and the first of her country—in the 400 m hurdles.
- Carlos Lopes, from Portugal, won the Marathon at the age of 37, with a time of 2:09:21, an Olympic record that stood for 24 years. It was the first gold medal ever for Portugal. Gold medal favorite, World Record holder and the then World Champion, Robert de Castella from Australia, finished in 5th place, 1:48 behind Lopes.
- A marathon for women was held for the first time at the Olympics (won by Joan Benoit of the U.S.). The event was also remembered for Swiss runner Gabriela Andersen-Schiess, who – suffering from heat exhaustion – entered the stadium for the final lap in a state of almost total exhaustion, barely able to walk but eventually completing the race, collapsing at the finishing line and being immediately treated by medical personnel.
- Daley Thompson of Great Britain apparently missed a new world record in winning his second consecutive gold medal in the decathlon; the next year, his score was retroactively raised to 8847, giving him the record.
- Sebastian Coe of Great Britain became the first man to win consecutive gold medals in the 1500m.
- Maricica Puică of Romania won the 3000 meters, known for the Mary Decker vs. Zola Budd rivalry. World champion and heavy favorite Decker fell after a controversial collision with Budd. However, Puică had the best annual time at the distance, easily run away from silver medalist Wendy Sly of Great Britain and appeared to have more to give if it had been necessary. Puică was injured during the very first Track and Field World Championships in Helsinki the year before, in which Decker had won both the 1500 meters and the 3000 meters.
- The first gold medal to be awarded at the Los Angeles Olympics was also the first-ever medal to be won by an athlete from China when Xu Haifeng won the 50 m Pistol event.
- Archer Neroli Fairhall from New Zealand was the first paraplegic Olympian at any Olympic Games, coming 35th in the Women's individual event.
- Synchronized swimming and rhythmic gymnastics debuted in Los Angeles as Olympic events, as did wind surfing.
- Li Ning from the People's Republic of China won 6 medals in gymnastics, 3 gold, 2 silver, and 1 bronze, earning him the nickname "Prince of Gymnasts" in China. Li would later light the Olympic Cauldron at the 2008 Olympics.
- Steve Redgrave of Great Britain won his first title in rowing of the record five he would go on to win in five Olympic competitions.
- Victor Davis of Canada set a new world record in winning the gold medal in the 200-meter breaststroke in swimming.
- Mary Lou Retton of the United States became the first gymnast outside Eastern Europe to win the gymnastics all-around competition.
- In men's gymnastics, the American team won the gold medal.
- France won the Olympic association football (soccer) tournament, defeating Brazil 2–0 in the final. Olympic football was unexpectedly played before massive crowds throughout America, with several sell-outs at the 100,000+ seat Rose Bowl. This interest eventually led to the U.S. hosting the 1994 FIFA World Cup.
- The Soviet-led boycott affected weightlifting more than any other sport: 94 of the world's top 100 ranked lifters were absent, as were 29 of the 30 medalists from the recent world championships. All 10 of the defending world champions in the 10 weight categories were absent. The success of the Eastern Bloc countries might be explained by state-run doping programs that had been developed there.
- Future Dream Team members Michael Jordan, Patrick Ewing, and Chris Mullin were on the team that won the gold medal in basketball. The 1984 U.S. men's Olympic basketball team was coached by Indiana Hoosiers head coach Bobby Knight.
- Connie Carpenter-Phinney of the United States became the first woman to win an Olympic cycling event when she won the women's individual road race.
- In the judo open division, four-time world champion Yasuhiro Yamashita of Japan tore a right calf muscle in the preliminary match against Arthur Schnabel. This put Yamashita at a huge disadvantage since he executed his throws by pivoting on his right leg. Though he managed to win the match with an Okuri-Eri-Jime, the injury caused him to visibly limp during the semi-final match against Laurent Del Colombo. Yamashita was thrown with an Osoto Gari only 30 seconds into the match, but managed to return an Osoto Gari and won the match with a Yoko-Shiho-Gatame (side four-quarter hold). He played the final match against Mohamed Ali Rashwan of Egypt. Yamashita won the final and the gold medal despite his injury. The match witnessed a remarkable fair play act from Rashwan who did not aim for Yamashita's right leg. Rashwan was even given an award from the International Fairplay Committee.

== Medal table ==
The United States topped the medal count for the first time since 1968, winning a record 83 gold medals and surpassing the Soviet Union's total of 80 golds at the 1980 Summer Olympics.

These are the top ten nations that won medals at the 1984 Games.

Key

‡ Changes in medal standings (see here)

* Host nation (United States)

1984 Summer Olympics medal table
| Rank | NOC | Gold | Silver | Bronze | Total |
|---|---|---|---|---|---|
| 1 | United States* | 83 | 61 | 30 | 174 |
| 2 | Romania‡ | 20 | 16 | 17 | 53 |
| 3 | West Germany | 17 | 19 | 23 | 59 |
| 4 | China | 15 | 8 | 9 | 32 |
| 5 | Italy | 14 | 6 | 12 | 32 |
| 6 | Canada | 10 | 18 | 16 | 44 |
| 7 | Japan | 10 | 8 | 14 | 32 |
| 8 | New Zealand | 8 | 1 | 2 | 11 |
| 9 | Yugoslavia‡ | 7 | 4 | 7 | 18 |
| 10 | South Korea | 6 | 6 | 7 | 19 |
| 11–47 | Remaining NOCs | 36 | 72 | 106 | 214 |
| Totals (47 entries) | | 226 | 219 | 243 | 688 |

== Broadcasting rights ==
In the United States, the Games were broadcast by the American Broadcasting Company (ABC), as part of a domestic deal with the LAOOC and with the IOC. It was the first time the IOC and a OCOG provided support for in-venue distribution. International television broadcasters and radio rights were acquired by 156 countries.

- Eurovision: Provided coverage for 31 countries in Europe
- Intervision: Provided coverage for 11 countries in Eastern Europe
- OTI (Organización de Televisión Iberoamericana): Represented the Spanish-speaking world
- Yugoslav Radio Television (JRT): The public broadcaster of Yugoslavia
- TV Asahi: Held the rights for Japan
- Channel Seven: Provided coverage for Australia
- TVNZ: Broadcast the Games live for New Zealand
- CBC: Canada
- Televisa: Mexico
- Inravisión: Cadena Uno of Colombia
- Sistema Brasileiro de Televisão: Brazil
- BBC: United Kingdom
- China Central Television (CCTV): Mainland China
- Antenne 2: France
- Doordarshan: India

== Legacy ==
The 1984 Los Angeles Olympics redefined the Games by introducing a financially sustainable private sponsorship model. It is known as the first "modern" Games for its use of existing venues, pioneering technology, and lasting community, social, and economic impact. The LAOOC's sponsorship model became the IOC's "The Olympic Partner programme", which now generates more than 40% of IOC revenue. Transporting games attendees and locals was so successful that several analyses were performed to understand why it worked so well. Planning for the games was a success that the organizers of several subsequent games contacted SCRTD and LA Metro to learn from the Los Angeles experience. Officials from Salt Lake City 2002, Sydney 2000 and Beijing 2008 contacted Los Angeles transit leaders regarding the preparation and execution of the 1984 transportation plan.

"Look of the Games" was a term first used by LA to describe the venue aesthetics for television. All subsequent games have used the term and have designed their look for all around use. LAOOC also for the first time allowed any athlete wishing to attend the closing ceremony to do so, a decision that has been continued.

The 1984 Olympics were the subject of the 1983–84 United States commemorative coin series. Additionally, filmmaker Bud Greenspan made the documentary 16 Days of Glory, which features behind-the-scenes look at athletes with in-depth interviews, recording sporting statistics, and covering games. It was released in 1985.

On July 18, 2009, a 25th anniversary celebration of the 1984 Games was held at the Los Angeles Memorial Coliseum. The celebration included a speech by former Los Angeles Olympic Organizing Committee president Peter Ueberroth, a short re-enactment of the Flying Rocketman sequence, the presentation of more than 35 (mostly South California-based) gold medal winners from 1984 (which was part of Ceremonies producer David Wolper's original 1984 plans) as well as a re-lighting of the Olympic cauldron.

=== Financial Success ===
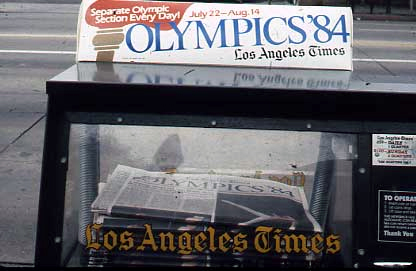
Newspaper vending machine announcing the 1984 Olympics.

Following the news of the massive financial losses of the 1976 Summer Olympics in Montreal, the only two cities to express a genuine interest in hosting the 1984 Games were Los Angeles and New York. Given that only one city per country is allowed to bid for any one Games, the USOC vote for the American bid city was effectively the deciding vote for the 1984 Olympics host city. In this case, the Los Angeles bid received 55 votes compared with New York's 39 votes – this is the closest that the city of New York has ever come to being selected to host the Olympic Games, coming closer in 1984 than they did in their 2012 bid (when they lost to London).

Ambitious construction projects for the two previous Summer Olympics, Montreal 1976 and Moscow 1980, had burdened organizers with substantial debts as expenses greatly exceeded revenues. Furthermore, the 1976 and 1980 Olympics were entirely government-funded. Unlike Montreal and Moscow, Los Angeles 1984 was privately funded, with strict controls imposed on expenditure; rather than constructing new venues with overly ambitious designs, the organizers chose instead to utilize existing venues and facilities wherever possible. The main example of this was the Los Angeles Memorial Coliseum, which was also the Olympic Stadium for the 1932 Summer Olympics. The only two new venues constructed specifically for the 1984 Summer Olympics were secured with the backing of corporate sponsors: the Olympic Velodrome was largely funded by the 7-Eleven corporation and the Olympic Swim Stadium by McDonald's.

In addition to corporate support, the Olympic committee also used the income from the exclusive television rights, and for the first time these contracts would prove to be a significant source of revenue. Adjusted for inflation, the Los Angeles Games secured twice the amount of income received by the 1980 Moscow Summer Olympics and four times that of the 1976 Montreal Summer Olympics.

The low level of interest among potential host cities for the 1984 Games had been viewed as a major threat to the future of the Olympic Games. However, after the financial success of the Los Angeles Games, cities began to show a renewed interest in bidding to become host again. The Los Angeles and Montreal Games are seen as examples of best and worst practice when organizing the Olympics and serve as valuable lessons to prospective host cities.

The total surplus was US $232.5 million (equivalent to US $608.77 million in 2025). Under the agreement made in 1979, 40 percent of any surplus was to stay in Southern California, with the other 60 percent going to the United States Olympic Committee.

=== LA84 Foundation ===
The LA84 Foundation was founded as a private, nonprofit institution created by the Los Angeles Olympic Organizing Committee to manage Southern California's endowment from the 1984 Olympic Games.

The LA84 Foundation's mission is to promote and expand youth sports opportunities in Southern California and to increase knowledge of sport and its impact on people's lives. Since inception, the Foundation has invested more than $225 million in Southern California by awarding grants to youth sports organizations, initiating sports and coaching education programs, and operating the world's premier sports library.

== In popular culture ==
- American fast food chain McDonald's ran a promotion titled "When the U.S. Wins, You Win" where customers scratched off a ticket with the name of an Olympic event on it. If the U.S. won a medal in that event, then they would be given a free menu item: a Big Mac for a gold medal, an order of french fries for a silver medal, and a Coca-Cola for a bronze medal. The promotion became more popular than expected due to the Soviet boycott which led to the U.S. winning far more Olympic medals than expected. This promotion was parodied in The Simpsons episode "Lisa's First Word", where Krusty Burger runs a similar offer. The promotion was intended to be rigged so that prizes would only be offered in events dominated by the Eastern Bloc, but the Soviet-led boycott causes Krusty to personally lose $44 million. He vehemently promises "to spit in every fiftieth burger," to which Homer retorts "I like those odds!" Chief Wiggum also exclaims that he could kiss Carl Lewis, who won four gold medals at the Games.
- On NCIS, Tim McGee has an obsession with jet packs, stemming from having attended the 1984 Olympic ceremony as a child and having Bill Suitor fly over his head in his jet pack. This storyline is based on the real experience of executive producer and writer Jesse Stern.
- Jilly Cooper's novel Riders has a storyline set at the show jumping event at the 1984 Summer Olympics.
- In the Seinfeld episode "The Gymnast", Jerry dates a woman who competed in the 1984 Olympics and won a silver medal for Romania.
- In American Horror Story: 1984, the characters watch it together on the TV in the girls cabin.

== See also ==
- 1984 Summer Paralympics
- 1984 Winter Paralympics
- 1984 Winter Olympics
- Olympic Games held in the United States
  - 1904 Summer Olympics – St. Louis
  - 1932 Summer Olympics – Los Angeles
  - 1932 Winter Olympics – Lake Placid
  - 1960 Winter Olympics – Squaw Valley
  - 1980 Winter Olympics – Lake Placid
  - 1984 Summer Olympics – Los Angeles
  - 1996 Summer Olympics – Atlanta
  - 2002 Winter Olympics – Salt Lake City
  - 2028 Summer Olympics – Los Angeles
  - 2034 Winter Olympics – Salt Lake City
- Olympic Games with significant boycotts
  - 1976 Summer Olympics – Montreal – African boycott
  - 1980 Summer Olympics – Moscow – United States-led boycott
  - 1984 Summer Olympics – Los Angeles – Soviet-led boycott
- List of IOC country codes
- Use of performance-enhancing drugs in the Olympic Games — 1984 Los Angeles
- 16 Days of Glory – official film
- De-satellization of Romania

Summer Olympics
| Preceded by Moscow | XXIII Olympiad; Los Angeles; 1984 | Succeeded by Seoul |
