= Equestrian at the 1976 Summer Olympics – Individual jumping =

Equestrian at the Olympics

Individual jumping at the Games of the XXI Olympiad
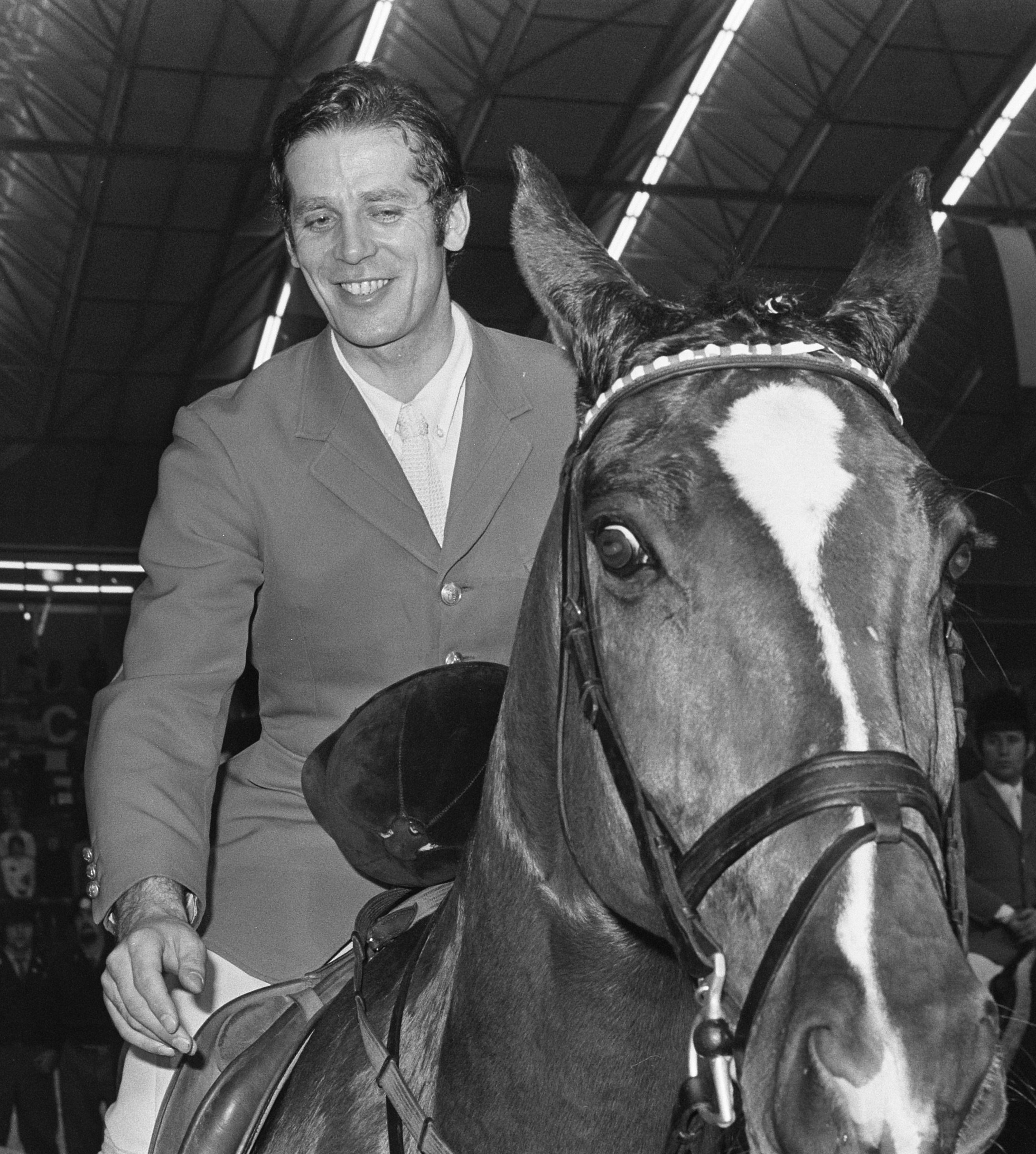
- Alwin Schockemöhle (1972)
- Venue: Olympic Equestrian Centre
- Date: 27 July
- Competitors: 47 from 20 nations
- Winning total: 0 faults

Medalists
1st place, gold medalist(s)		Alwin Schockemöhle; West Germany
2nd place, silver medalist(s)		Michel Vaillancourt; Canada
3rd place, bronze medalist(s)		François Mathy; Belgium

The individual show jumping at the 1976 Summer Olympics took place on 27 July. The event was open to men and women. The individual show jumping event consisted of two rounds, held separately from the team competition. The top 20 riders from the first round qualified for the second round, both rounds were then combined to determine placement, if tied a jump-off between all tied riders would determine the winners. There were 47 competitors from 20 nations. The event was won by Alwin Schockemöhle of West Germany, the nation's first medal in individual jumping as a separate team (both Germany and the United Team of Germany had won a gold medal before). Canada also earned its first medal in the event, with Michel Vaillancourt's silver. François Mathy's bronze was Belgium's first medal in the event since 1912. Great Britain's podium streak in individual jumping ended at four Games, as Debbie Johnsey took fourth after reaching a three-way jump-off against Vaillancourt and Mathy but coming last out of the jump-off.

== Background ==
This was the 15th appearance of the event, which had first been held at the 1900 Summer Olympics and has been held at every Summer Olympics at which equestrian sports have been featured (that is, excluding 1896, 1904, and 1908). It is the oldest event on the current programme, the only one that was held in 1900. The team and individual events remained separated, as they had been starting in 1968.

Five of the top 10 (top 12, after ties) riders from the 1972 competition returned: gold medalist Graziano Mancinelli of Italy, fourth-place finishers Jim Day of Canada and Hugo Simon of Austria, seventh-place finisher Jean-Marcel Rozier of France, and eighth-place finisher Alfonso Segovia of Spain. Also returning were the brothers Piero D'Inzeo and Raimondo D'Inzeo. Raimondo had won the 1960 gold and 1956 silver medals; Piero had won the 1960 silver and 1956 bronze medals. The brothers were competing in their eighth (and final) Olympics, the first people to appear in eight Games. The 1956 gold medalist Hans Günter Winkler of West Germany was also competing again after not participating in 1972. Hartwig Steenken, also of West Germany, was the reigning World Champion but did not compete in Montreal.

Guatemala and Puerto Rico each made their debut in the event. France competed for the 14th time, most of any nation, having missed the individual jumping only in 1932.

== Competition format ==
The competition used the two-round format introduced in 1952, with the elimination feature added in 1968. The top 20 riders from the first round qualified for the second round, both rounds were then combined to determine placement, if tied a jump-off between all tied riders would determine the winners.

== Schedule ==
All times are Eastern Daylight Time (UTC-4)

Date	Time	Round
Tuesday, 27 July 1976	8:00; 14:30	Round 1 Round 2

== Results ==
Schockemöhle was the first rider to achieve a clean run in both rounds since the competition moved to the two-round format in 1952.

Rank	Rider	Nation	Round 1	Round 2	Total	Jump-off
1st place, gold medalist(s)	Alwin Schockemöhle	West Germany	0.00	0.00	0.00	—
2nd place, silver medalist(s)	Michel Vaillancourt	Canada	4.00	8.00	12.00	4.00
3rd place, bronze medalist(s)	François Mathy	Belgium	8.00	4.00	12.00	8.00
4	Debbie Johnsey	Great Britain	4.00	8.00	12.00	15.25
5	Guy Creighton	Australia	4.00	12.00	16.00	—
5	Marcel Rozier	France	4.00	12.00	16.00	—
5	Frank Chapot	United States	4.00	12.00	16.00	—
5	Hugo Simon	Austria	8.00	8.00	16.00	—
9	Luis Álvarez	Spain	8.00	9.50	17.50	—
10	Eduardo Amorós	Spain	8.00	12.00	20.00	—
10	Hans Günter Winkler	West Germany	4.00	16.00	20.00	—
12	Raimondo D'Inzeo	Italy	8.00	16.00	24.00	—
13	Henk Nooren	Netherlands	8.00	18.00	26.00	—
14	Peter Robeson	Great Britain	4.00	23.75	27.75	—
15	Jim Elder	Canada	8.00	20.00	28.00	—
15	Jim Day	Canada	8.00	20.00	28.00	—
17	Hubert Parot	France	8.00	20.25	28.25	—
18	Argentino Molinuevo Jr.	Argentina	8.00	27.50	35.50	—
19	Carlos Aguirre	Mexico	6.00	DSQ	Elim.	—
20	Juan Rieckehoff	Puerto Rico	8.00	DSQ	Elim.	—
21	Fernando Senderos	Mexico	11.75	did not advance		—
22	Dennis Murphy	United States	12.00	did not advance		—
22	Roberto Tagle	Argentina	12.00	did not advance		—
22	Oswaldo Méndez	Guatemala	12.00	did not advance		—
25	Graziano Mancinelli	Italy	16.00	did not advance		—
25	Piero D'Inzeo	Italy	16.00	did not advance		—
25	Bruno Candrian	Switzerland	16.00	did not advance		—
25	Toon Ebben	Netherlands	16.00	did not advance		—
29	Buddy Brown	United States	16.50	did not advance		—
30	Joe Yorke	New Zealand	20.00	did not advance		—
30	Rob Eras	Netherlands	20.00	did not advance		—
30	Hirokazu Higashira	Japan	20.00	did not advance		—
30	Stanny Van Paesschen	Belgium	20.00	did not advance		—
30	Graham Fletcher	Great Britain	20.00	did not advance		—
30	Jan-Olof Wannius	Sweden	20.00	did not advance		—
36	Paul Schockemöhle	West Germany	24.00	did not advance		—
37	Kevin Bacon	Australia	25.50	did not advance		—
38	Thomas Frühmann	Austria	28.00	did not advance		—
39	Tsunekazu Takeda	Japan	33.00	did not advance		—
40	Luis Razo	Mexico	33.50	did not advance		—
41	Marc Roguet	France	36.00	did not advance		—
42	Ryuichi Obata	Japan	47.00	did not advance		—
43	Eric Wauters	Belgium	47.50	did not advance		—
—	Barry Roycroft	Australia	DSQ	did not advance		—
—	Henk Hulzebos	Austria	DSQ	did not advance		—
—	Roberto Nielsen-Reyes	Bolivia	DSQ	did not advance		—
—	Alfonso Segovia	Spain	DSQ	did not advance		—
—	Jorge Llambi	Argentina	DNS	did not advance		—
