= Equestrian at the 1976 Summer Olympics – Team jumping =

Team jumping at the Games of the XXI Olympiad
- Venue: Olympic Equestrian Centre
- Date: 27 July
- Competitors: 52 from 14 nations

Medalists
1st place, gold medalist(s)		Hubert Parot; Jean-Marcel Rozier; Marc Roguet; Michel Roche	France
2nd place, silver medalist(s)		Alwin Schockemöhle; Hans Günter Winkler; Sönke Sönksen; Paul Schockemöhle	West Germany
3rd place, bronze medalist(s)		Eric Wauters; François Mathy; Edgar-Henri Cuepper; Stanny Van Paesschen	Belgium

The team jumping at the 1976 Summer Olympics took place on 1 August. The event was open to men and women. The individual show jumping event consisted of two rounds, held separately from the team competition. The team show jumping event consisted of two rounds, held separately from the individual competition. The top 8 teams from the first round qualified for the second round. Each rider on the team rides the course the rider with the most faults, score is thrown out, the remaining score are added up to determine the total points. This was repeated in the second round, both rounds were then added together to determine placement, if tied a jump-off between all tied teams would determine the winners.

== Results ==
Rank	Riders	Nation	Round 1	Round 2	Total
1st place, gold medalist(s)	Hubert Parot; Jean-Marcel Rozier; Marc Roguet; Michel Roche	France	24.00	16.00	40.00
2nd place, silver medalist(s)	Alwin Schockemöhle; Hans Günter Winkler; Sönke Sönksen; Paul Schockemöhle	West Germany	24.00	20.00	44.00
3rd place, bronze medalist(s)	Eric Wauters; François Mathy; Edgar-Henri Cuepper; Stanny Van Paesschen	Belgium	32.00	31.00	63.00
4	Frank Chapot; Robert Ridland; Buddy Brown; Michael Matz	United States	40.00	24.00	64.00
5	Jim Day; Michel Vaillancourt; Ian Millar; Jim Elder	Canada	28.00	36.50	64.50
6	Luis Álvarez; Alfonso Segovia; José María Rosillo; Eduardo Amorós	Spain	31.00	40.00	71.00
7	Debbie Johnsey; Rowland Fernyhough; Peter Robeson; Graham Fletcher	Great Britain	44.00	32.00	76.00
8	Fernando Hernández; Fernando Senderos; Luis Razo; Carlos Aguirre	Mexico	31.75	44.50	76.25
9T	Guy Creighton; Barry Roycroft; Kevin Bacon	Australia	48.00	did not advance	
9T	Piero D'Inzeo; Graziano Mancinelli; Raimondo D'Inzeo; Giorgio Nuti	Italy	48.00	did not advance	
11	Hugo Simon; Thomas Frühmann; Henk Hulzebos; Rüdiger Wassibauer	Austria	52.00	did not advance	
12	Rob Eras; Toon Ebben; Henk Nooren; Johan Heins	Netherlands	60.00	did not advance	
13	Masayasu Sugitani; Hirokazu Higashira; Tsunekazu Takeda; Ryuichi Obata	Japan	67.25	did not advance	
–	Roberto Tagle; Argentino Molinuevo Jr. Jorge Llambi	Argentina	DSQ	did not advance	
