= Dutch Sportsman of the year =

Sporting award in the Netherlands

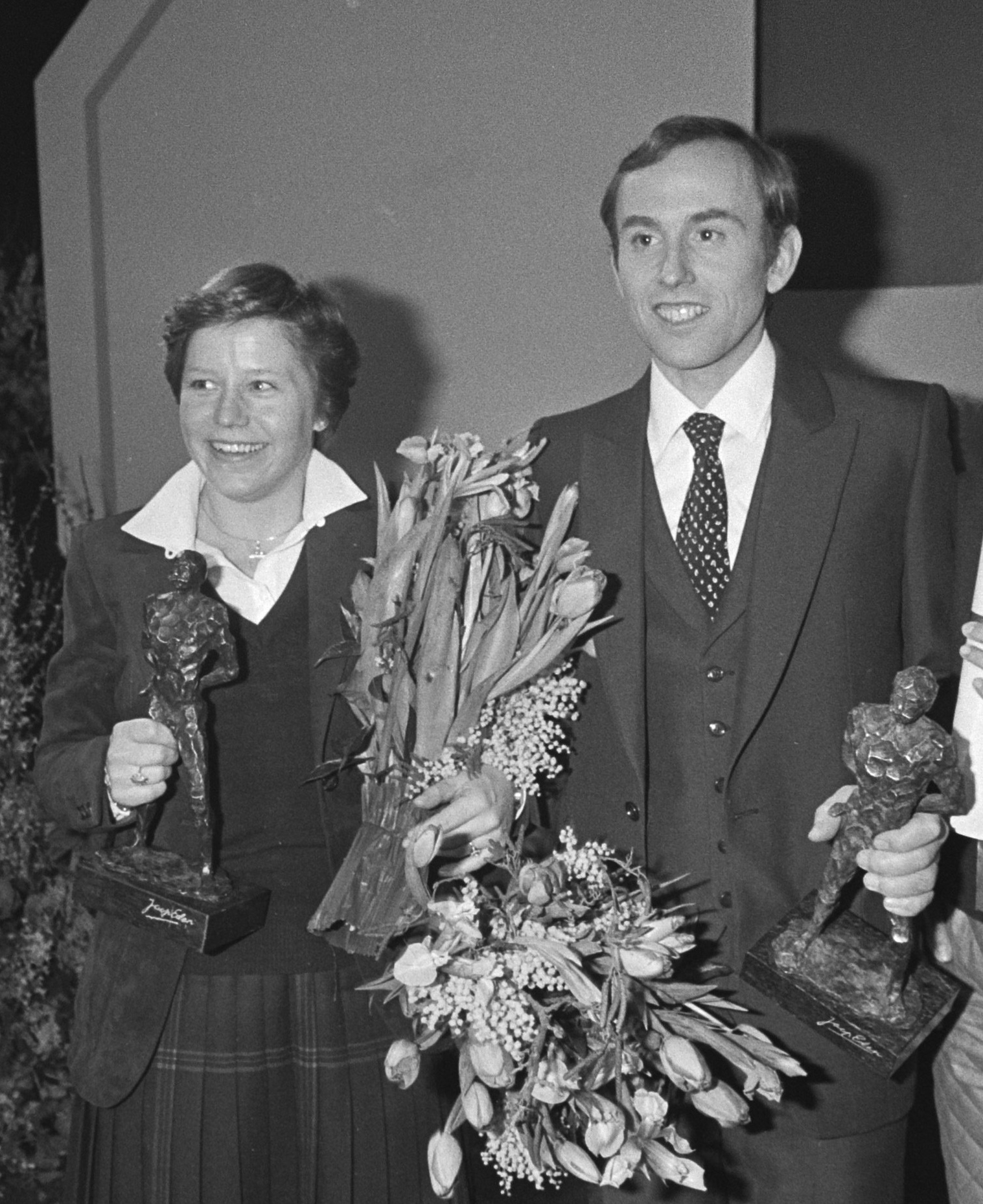
Speed skater Annie Borckink (left) and cyclist Joop Zoetemelk (right) with their Jaap Eden statuettes in 1981

The Dutch Sportsman and Sportswoman of the Year are chosen annually by Dutch athletes from a shortlist compiled by sports journalists. The elections are organized by the Dutch Olympic Committee.

All the winners receive a Jaap Eden Award to remember their title. The prize for this achievement is a statuette created by painter and sculptor Jits Bakker (born 1937) from Bilthoven and is named after Jaap Eden.

Since 1968, a Sport Team of the Year is chosen.

== Sportsperson of the Year (1951–1958) ==
Year	Sporter of the Year	Sport
1951	Abe Lenstra	football
1952	Abe Lenstra	football
1953	Arie van Vliet	cycling
1954	Geertje Wielema	swimming
1955	Mary Kok	swimming
1956	Klaas Boot	gymnastics
1957	Anton Geesink	judo
1958	Gerrit Schulte	cycling

Source: NOC*NSF

== Sportsman & sportswoman of the Year (from 1959) ==
Year	Sportsman of the Year	Sport	Sportswoman of the Year	Sport
1959	Arie van Houwelingen	cycling	Sjoukje Dijkstra	figure skating
1960	Eef Kamerbeek	athletics	Sjoukje Dijkstra	figure skating
1961	Anton Geesink; Henk van der Grift	judo speed skating	Sjoukje Dijkstra	figure skating
1962	Henk Nijdam	cycling	Sjoukje Dijkstra	figure skating
1963	Peter Post	cycling	Sjoukje Dijkstra	figure skating
1964	Anton Geesink	judo	Sjoukje Dijkstra	figure skating
1965	Anton Geesink	judo	Ada Kok	swimming
1966	Ard Schenk; Kees Verkerk	speed skating speed skating	Ada Kok	swimming
1967	Kees Verkerk	speed skating	Stien Kaiser	speed skating
1968	Jan Janssen	cycling	Ada Kok	swimming
1969	Tom Okker	tennis	Maria Gommers	athletics
1970	Ard Schenk	speed skating	Atje Keulen-Deelstra	speed skating
1971	Ard Schenk	speed skating	Willy Stähle	waterskiing
1972	Ard Schenk	speed skating	Ans van Gerwen	gymnastics
1973	Johan Cruijff	football	Enith Brigitha	swimming
1974	Johan Cruijff	football	Enith Brigitha	swimming
1975	Jos Hermens	athletics	Dianne de Leeuw	figure skating
1976	Piet Kleine	speed skating	Keetie van Oosten	cycling
1977	Hennie Kuiper	cycling	Betty Stöve	tennis
1978	Gerrie Knetemann	cycling	Keetie van Oosten	cycling
1979	Jan Raas	cycling	Petra de Bruin	cycling
1980	Joop Zoetemelk	cycling	Annie Borckink	speed skating
1981	Hennie Stamsnijder	cycling (cyclo-cross)	Bettine Vriesekoop	table tennis
1982	Gerard Nijboer	athletics	Annemarie Verstappen	swimming
1983	Rob Druppers	athletics	Conny van Bentum	swimming
1984	Stephan van den Berg	windsurfing	Ria Stalman	athletics
1985	Joop Zoetemelk	cycling	Bettine Vriesekoop	table tennis
1986	Hein Vergeer	speed skating	Nelli Cooman	athletics
1987	Ruud Gullit	football	Irene de Kok	judo
1988	Steven Rooks	cycling	Yvonne van Gennip	speed skating
1989	Leo Visser	speed skating	Elly van Hulst	athletics
1990	Erik Breukink	cycling	Leontien van Moorsel	cycling
1991	Arnold Vanderlyde; Edwin Jongejans	boxing diving	Ingrid Haringa	cycling
1992	Bart Veldkamp	speed skating	Ellen van Langen	athletics
1993	Falko Zandstra	speed skating	Leontien van Moorsel	cycling
1994	Regilio Tuur	boxing	Anky van Grunsven	dressage
1995	Danny Nelissen	cycling	Angelique Seriese	judo
1996	Richard Krajicek	tennis	Ingrid Haringa	cycling
1997	Marcel Wouda	swimming	Tonny de Jong	speed skating
1998	Gianni Romme	speed skating	Marianne Timmer	speed skating
1999	Pieter van den Hoogenband	swimming	Leontien Zijlaard-van Moorsel	cycling
2000	Pieter van den Hoogenband	swimming	Leontien Zijlaard-van Moorsel	cycling
2001	Erik Dekker	cycling	Inge de Bruijn	swimming
2002	Jochem Uytdehaage	speed skating	Verona van de Leur	gymnastics
2003	Erben Wennemars	speed skating	Leontien Zijlaard-van Moorsel	cycling
2004	Pieter van den Hoogenband	swimming	Leontien Zijlaard-van Moorsel	cycling
2005	Yuri van Gelder	gymnastics	Edith van Dijk	swimming
2006	Theo Bos	cycling	Ireen Wüst	speed skating
2007	Sven Kramer	speed skating	Marleen Veldhuis	swimming
2008	Maarten van der Weijden	swimming	Marianne Vos	cycling
2009	Epke Zonderland	gymnastics	Marianne Vos	cycling
2010	Mark Tuitert	speed skating	Nicolien Sauerbreij	snowboarding
2011	Epke Zonderland	gymnastics	Ranomi Kromowidjojo	Swimming
2012	Epke Zonderland	gymnastics	Ranomi Kromowidjojo	Swimming
2013	Epke Zonderland	gymnastics	Marianne Vos	cycling
2014	Arjen Robben	football	Ireen Wüst	speed skating
2015	Sjinkie Knegt	short track speed skating	Dafne Schippers	athletics
2016	Max Verstappen	motorsport	Sanne Wevers	gymnastics
2017	Tom Dumoulin	cycling	Dafne Schippers	athletics
2018	Kjeld Nuis	speed skating	Suzanne Schulting	short track speed skating
2019	Mathieu van der Poel	cycling	Sifan Hassan	athletics
2020	Not held due to the COVID-19 pandemic.
2021	Max Verstappen	motorsport	Sifan Hassan	athletics
2022	Max Verstappen	motorsport	Irene Schouten	speed skating
2023	Mathieu van der Poel	cycling	Femke Bol	athletics
2024	Harrie Lavreysen	cycling	Sifan Hassan	athletics
2025	Harrie Lavreysen	cycling	Jessica Schilder	shot put

== Sports Team of the Year (from 1968) ==
Year	Sports Team of the Year	Sport
1968	AFC Ajax	football
1969	AFC Ajax	football
1970	Feyenoord	football
1971	Netherlands women's national field hockey team	field hockey
1972	AFC Ajax	football
1973	Netherlands men's national field hockey team	field hockey
1974	Netherlands men's national football team	football
1975	Ijsselmeervogels	football
1976	Netherlands men's national water polo team	water polo
1977	National jumping team (Anton Ebben, Johan Heins, Henk Nooren en Harry Wouters van den Oudenweijer)	equestrian
1978	Netherlands men's national football team	football
1979	Netherlands men's ice hockey team	ice hockey
1980	TI–Raleigh	road bicycle racing
1981
1982
1983
1984
1985
1986
1987	AFC Ajax	football
1988
1989
1990
1991
1992
1993
1994
1995	AFC Ajax	football
1996
1997
1998
1999
2000
2001
2002
2003
2004
2005
2006	Netherlands women's national field hockey team	field hockey
2007	Netherlands men's national under-21 football team	football
2008	Netherlands women's national waterpolo team	waterpolo
2009	Women's 4 × 100 metres freestyle relay team	swimming
2010	Netherlands men's national football team	football
2011	Netherlands men's baseball football team	baseball
2012	Netherlands men's national field hockey team	field hockey
2013	Men's beach volleyball team (Alexander Brouwer and Robert Meeuwsen)	volleyball
2014	Netherlands men's national football team	football
2015	Men's beach volleyball team (Reinder Nummerdor and Christiaan Varenhorst)	volleyball
2016	Women's double scull team (Ilse Paulis and Maaike Head)	rowing
2017	Netherlands women's national football team	football
2018	Men's team sprint team (Roy van den Berg, Matthijs Büchli, Nils van 't Hoenderdaal, Jeffrey Hoogland, and Harrie Lavreysen)	cycling
2019	Netherlands women's national handball team	handball
2020/2021	Men's team sprint team (Roy van den Berg, Matthijs Büchli, Jeffrey Hoogland, and Harrie Lavreysen)	cycling
2022	Women's 4 × 400 metres relay team (Femke Bol, Andrea Bouma, Lieke Klaver, Eveline Saalberg, Laura de Witte, and Lisanne de Witte)	athletics
2023	Women's 4 × 400 metres relay team (Femke Bol, Lieke Klaver, Cathelijn Peeters, Eveline Saalberg, and Lisanne de Witte)	athletics
2024	Men's national 3x3 team	3x3 basketball
2025	Men's rowing eight team	Rowing

== Disabled sportsman or sportswoman of the Year (from 2002) ==
Year	Sportsperson of the Year	Sport
2002	Esther Vergeer	wheelchair tennis
2003	Esther Vergeer	wheelchair tennis
2004	Kenny van Weeghel	athletics
2005	Esther Vergeer	wheelchair tennis
2006	Pieter Gruijters	athletics
2007	Annette Roozen; Marion Nijhof	athletics Swimming
2008	Esther Vergeer	wheelchair tennis
2009	Monique van der Vorst	handbiking
2010	Esther Vergeer	wheelchair tennis
2011	Thierry Schmitter	sailing
2012	Marlou van Rhijn	athletics
2013	Marlou van Rhijn	athletics
2014	Bibian Mentel	snowboarding
2015	Jiske Griffioen	tennis
2016	Liesette Bruinsma	swimming
2017	Jetze Plat	handbiking/Triathlon
2018	Bibian Mentel	snowboarding
2019	Jetze Plat	handbiking/Triathlon
2020	Not held due to the COVID-19 pandemic.
2021	Jetze Plat	handbiking/Triathlon
2022	Diede de Groot	wheelchair tennis
2023	Diede de Groot; Joël de Jong	wheelchair tennis athletics
2024	Fleur Jong; Jetze Plat	athletics handbiking/triathlon
2025	Niels Vink	wheelchair tennis

Source: NOC*NSF

== See also ==
- Dutch Athlete of the Year
- Dutch Footballer of the Year
- Amsterdam Sportsman of the year
- Rotterdam Sportsman of the year
