= Michel Vaillancourt =

Canadian equestrian

Vaillancourt, Michel

Personal information
- Full name: Michel Vaillancourt
- Nationality: Canada
- Discipline: Show jumping
- Born: July 26, 1954 (age 70); Saint-Félix-de-Valois, Quebec, Canada
- Height: 5 ft 10 in (1.78 m)
- Weight: 148 lb (67 kg; 10 st 8 lb)
Medal record
Representing Canada
Olympic Games
| Silver medal – second place | 1976 Montreal | Individual jumping |
Pan American Games
| Silver medal – second place | 1979 San Juan | Team jumping |
| Bronze medal – third place | 1975 Mexico City | Team jumping |

Michel Vaillancourt (born July 26, 1954) is a Canadian show jumper who won an individual silver medal at the 1976 Olympics. He tied for second place with Debbie Johnsey and François Mathy, but won the silver in a jump-off. Vaillancourt finished in fifth place with the Canadian team.

Vaillancourt started training in horse riding aged 12, encouraged by his father, an equestrian coach who died in a horse riding accident in 1971. At his first international competition, Vaillancourt won a team bronze medal at the 1975 Pan American Games. He won a silver team medal at the next Games in 1979. Vaillancourt missed the 1980 Olympics in Moscow that were boycotted by Canada, and competed at the Alternate Olympics, winning a team gold medal. After retiring from competitions he worked as a course designer and coach, supervising the Canadian equestrian team at the 1994 and 1998 Olympics. He was inducted into the Jump Canada Hall of Fame in 2009.
