= El Imparcial =

Puerto Rican newspaper

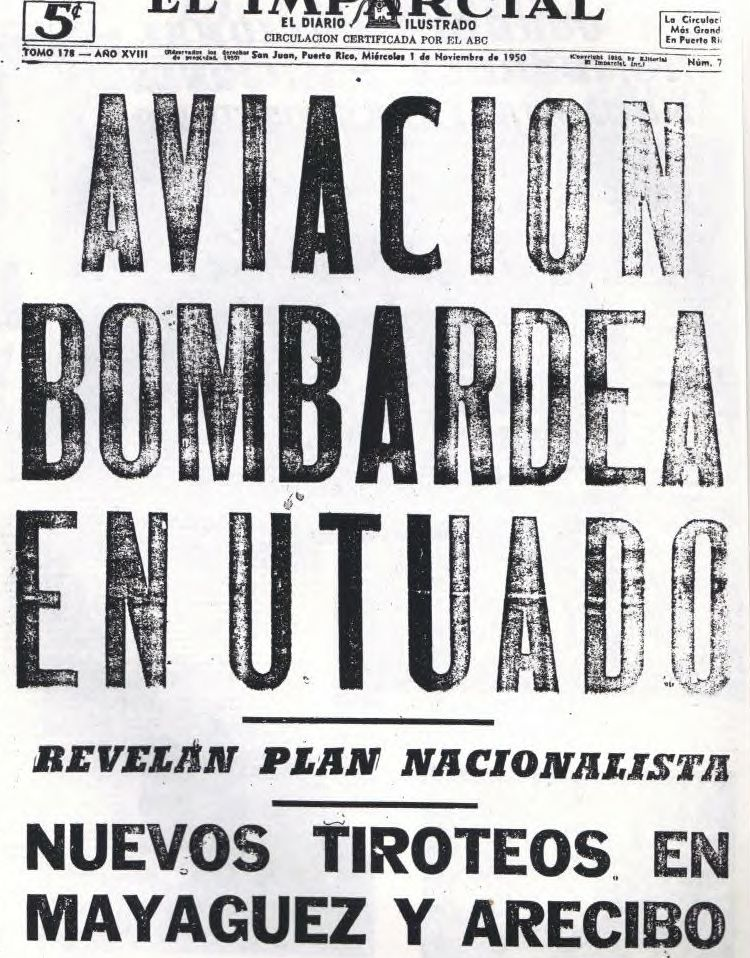
- Front page of El Imparcial on November 1, 1950, following the Utuado uprising
- Type: Daily newspaper
- Format: Tabloid
- Owner: Prensa Insular de Puerto Rico
- President: Ferdinand G. Aponte Rivera
- Editor: Antonio Ayuso Valdivieso (ca. 1933 and ca. 1951); Miguel A. García Méndez (ca. 1975)
- Founded: 1918
- Ceased publication: 28 February 1973 (Note: This is the latest date of publication provided by reliable sources.)
- Political alignment: Conservative
- Language: Spanish; English
- Headquarters: San Juan, Puerto Rico

El Imparcial, founded in 1918, was "an anti-Popular, pro-Independence tabloid" in Puerto Rico. It circulated daily, except Sundays. Its full name was El Imparcial: El diario ilustrado de Puerto Rico.

El Imparcial was given new life in 1933 under the leadership of Antonio Ayuso Valdivieso. The paper Valdivieso bought that year for $2,000 at an auction was described as a "floundering literary periodical" in his obituary; under his leadership it became Puerto Rico's second largest newspaper (after El Mundo). He sought to emulate the New York Daily News. Valdivieso, who had headed the nationalist party prior to acquiring the paper, penned editorials arguing for Puerto Rican independence.

Though a contemporary story in Editor & Publisher described the paper as "frowned upon by intellectuals and ridiculed by reformers," the paper grew to a circulation of 65,000, making it the most widely-read publication on the island. Its reporting on government corruption in the 1940s resulted in an important court precedent on freedom of the press and government transparency. Valdivieso was incapacitated by illness in the early 1960s, and his second wife took over the business management of the paper. In the late 1960s the family brought in new management, which made a number of changes, including softening the pro-independence stance. Circulation dropped significantly. Valdivieso died in 1970.

In the 1970s Miguel A. García Méndez bought the newspaper. The headquarters of the newspaper were destroyed by arson in an act of political sabotage. The paper somewhat recovered and kept running for a short time after that with only one-third of its employees. Eventually, the government expropriated the building where it was located. The last known issue of the paper is dated 28 February 1973 (Año 38, núm. 14,210). However, La Casa de la Herencia Cultural Puertorriqueña in New York City has editions of the newspaper spanning many years.

== Use of political cartoons ==
Among the oldest cartoon in Latin America is CHEO, created in 1944 by Fernando Luis Conesa and published in single panel format depicting the titular character, a generally aloof man, in a number of comedic situations involving daily life and interactions about work, family and society. This cartoonist had begun publishing political caricatures in sociopolitical papers such as El Florete entering into the 1940s, dealing with a variety of issues including daily social issues, politics of the early Muñoz Marín era (during his time as head of the PPD and Senate), war, the great migration, sports, social campaigns, American policies at Puerto Rico or criticizing the territorial status. By 1943, Conesa had been employed by newspaper El Imparcial and began publishing his caricatures in it, while also working as a draftsman and journalist, expanding his repertoire to include comics Gente Que Nos Agria La Vida (about annoying practices that people had during the era), La Ocurencia de la Semana (a Sunday multi-panel strip featuring Cheo in mishaps written by readers) and La Caricatura del Día. In total, over 200 of his caricatures were printed in this newspaper, with other illustrations depicting more serious situations and substituting photography in the daily news. CHEO would later be adopted by other authors and continued being published on a regular basis, having become the longest-running cartoon in Latin America by the early 2000s.

== Contributing writers ==
Among the more prominent journalists with El Imparcial were Luis Pales Matos, Angel Rivero Mendez, Hector Campos Parsi, Rafael Pont Flores, and Luis Rechani Agrait. Other contributors were Carmen Mirabal, Aida Zorrilla, Miguel Angel Yumet, Luis Colón, Victor M. Padilla and Millie Cappalli Arango.

== Circulation ==
From 1964-65, its Monday thru Saturday average daily circulation was 51,119.
