= Jan-Olof =

Jan-Olof may refer to:

- Jan-Olof Bengtsson, a Swedish journalist
- Jan-Olof Borgén (born 1937), a Swedish Army major general
- Jan-Olof Ekholm (1931–2020), a Swedish detective fiction writer
- Jan-Olof Larsson (born 1951), a Swedish Social Democratic politician
- Jan Olof Olsson (1920–1974), a Swedish writer and a journalist
- Jan-Olof Strandberg (1926–2020), a Swedish stage and film actor
- Jan-Olof Wannius (born 1942), a Swedish equestrian
