= Joe Yorke =

New Zealand equestrian

Personal information
- Full name: Ashton Donald Yorke
- Born: 7 December 1947 (age 77); Whanganui, New Zealand

Sport
- Country: New Zealand
- Sport: Equestrian
- Event: Show jumping

Ashton Donald "Joe" Yorke (born 7 December 1947) is a New Zealand equestrian. He competed in the individual jumping event at the 1976 Summer Olympics.
