= German immigration to Puerto Rico =

Began in the early part of the 19th century

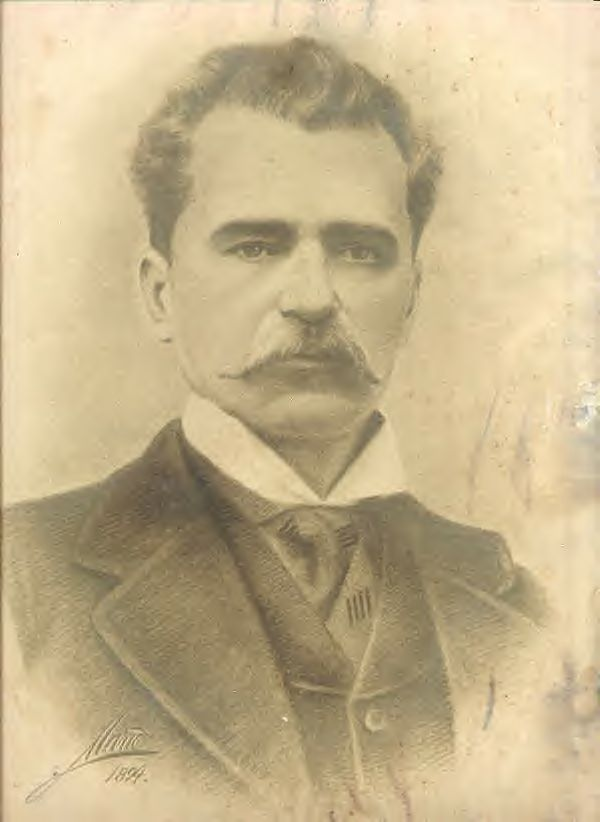
Salvador Brau

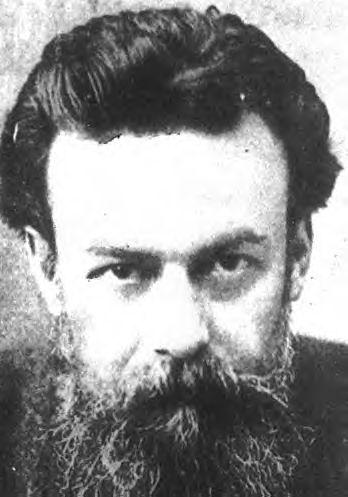
Federico Degetau

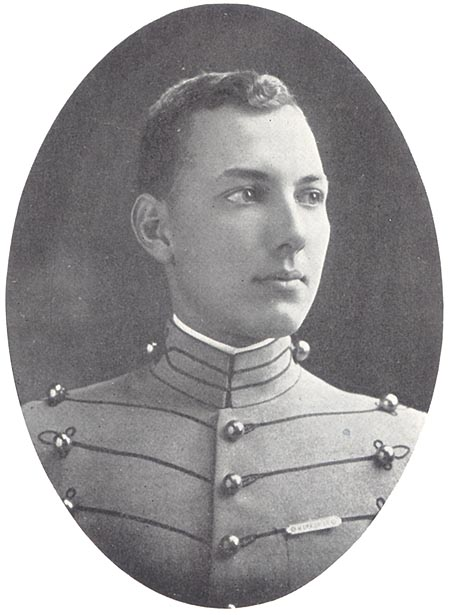
Luis R. Esteves Völckers

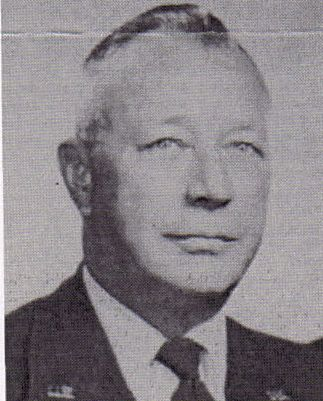
Virgil R. Miller

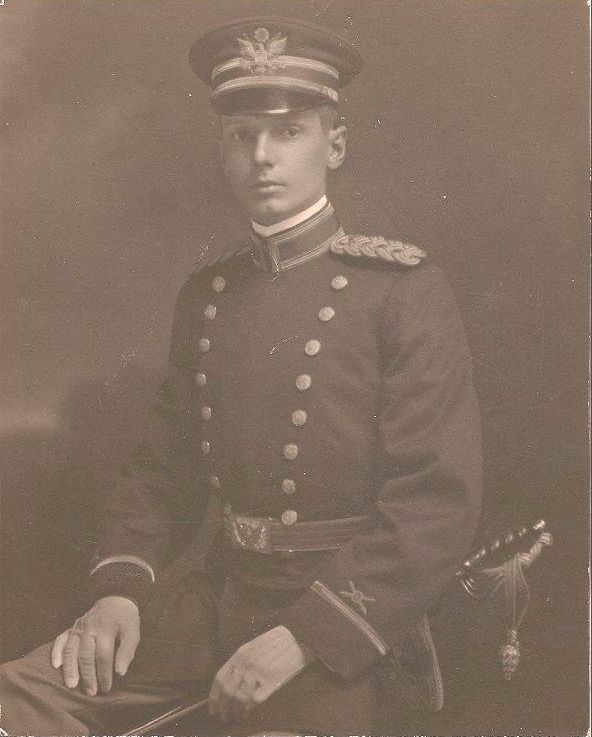
Rudolph William Riefkohl

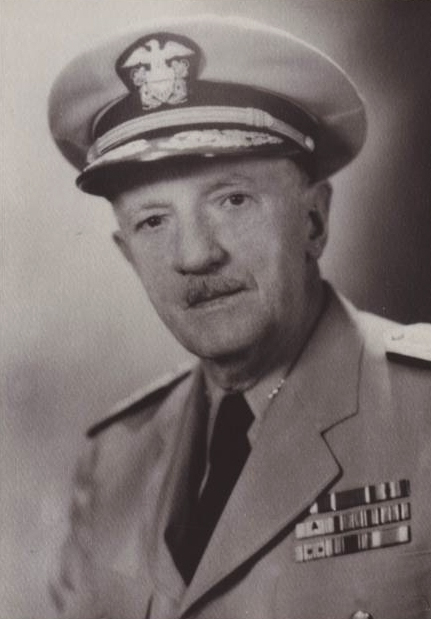
Frederick Lois Riefkohl

German immigration to Puerto Rico (Spanish: Puertorriqueños alemanes) began in the early part of the 19th century and continued to increase when German businessmen immigrated and established themselves with their families on the island.

However, it was the economic and political situation in Europe during the early 19th century plus the fact that the Spanish Crown re-issued the Royal Decree of Graces (Real Cédula de Gracias) which now allowed Europeans who were not of Spanish origin to immigrate to the island that contributed the most to the immigration of hundreds of German families to Puerto Rico in search of a better life.

Puerto Rico was ceded by Spain to the United States under the terms of the 1898 Treaty of Paris, which ended the Spanish–American War, and the U.S. established military bases there.

Many soldiers of German-American background stationed in the island upon encountering Puerto Ricans of German ancestry quickly made social contact with them. Not surprisingly, many of them stayed on the island and married into local families that had been established for decades since their own arrival from Germany.

With the passage of the Jones Act of 1917 Puerto Ricans could be conscripted to serve in the Armed Forces of the United States. As a result, Puerto Ricans fought in Germany during World War II and have served in U.S. military installations in said country since then.

Many of these soldiers married German women who eventually moved to the island with their families. Puerto Ricans of German descent have distinguished themselves in different fields, among them the fields of science, business and the military.

== Early German immigration ==
According to Professor Úrsula Schmidt-Acosta, German immigrants arrived in Puerto Rico from Curaçao and Austria during the early 19th century. Many of these early German immigrants established warehouses and businesses in the coastal towns of Fajardo, Arroyo, Ponce, Mayagüez, Cabo Rojo and Aguadilla. One of the reasons that these businessmen established themselves in the island was that Germany depended mostly on Britain for such products as coffee, sugar and tobacco. By establishing businesses dedicated to the exportation and importation of these and other goods, Germany no longer had to rely on British sellers for such goods. Not all of the immigrants were businessmen; some were teachers, farmers and skilled laborers.

== Situation in 19th century Europe ==
=== Economic situation ===
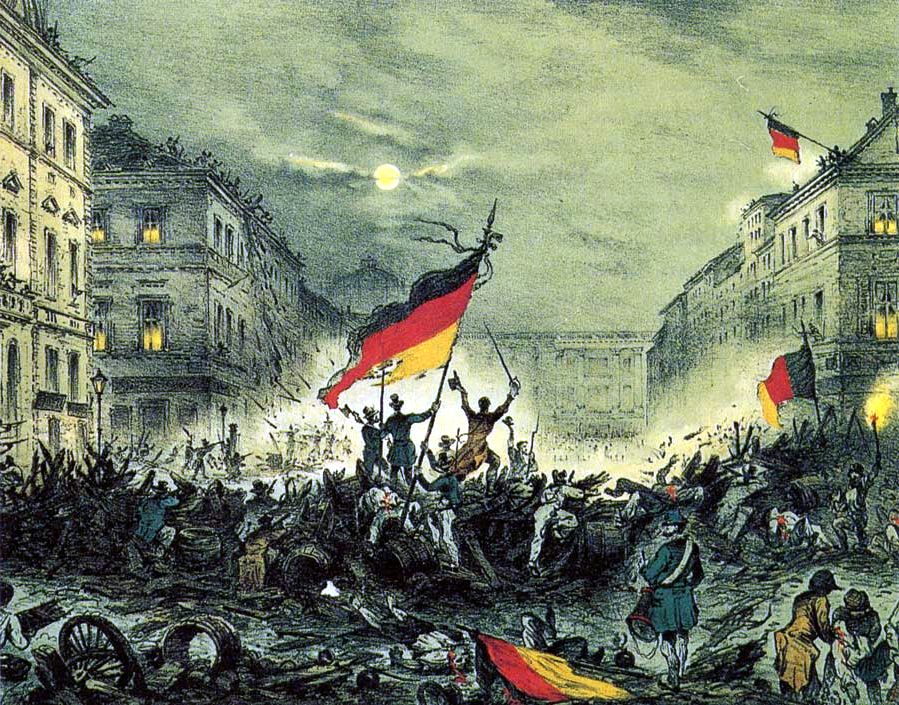
Cheering revolutionaries after fighting in March 1848

Many economic and political changes occurred in Europe during the latter part of the 18th century and the beginning of the 19th century, changes which affected the lives of millions of people. One of these changes came about with the advent of the Second Industrial Revolution. Many people who worked the farmlands abandoned their homes and moved to the larger, industrialized cities with the hope of finding better paying jobs. Those who continued to work in the agricultural sector suffered the consequences of the widespread crop failures which came about as the result of long periods of drought and disease, the cholera epidemic and a general deterioration of economic conditions. Starvation and unemployment were on the rise.

=== Political situation ===
Europe also faced a series of revolutionary movements known as the European Revolutions of 1848 which erupted in Sicily and then were further triggered by the French Revolution of 1848. Soon the Revolutions of 1848 in the German states erupted, leading to the Frankfurt Parliament. Ultimately, the rather non-violent "revolutions" failed. Disappointed, many Germans immigrated to the Americas and Puerto Rico, dubbed the Forty-Eighters. The majority of these came from Alsace-Lorraine, Baden, Hesse, Rheinland and Württemberg.

== Spanish Royal Decree of Graces ==
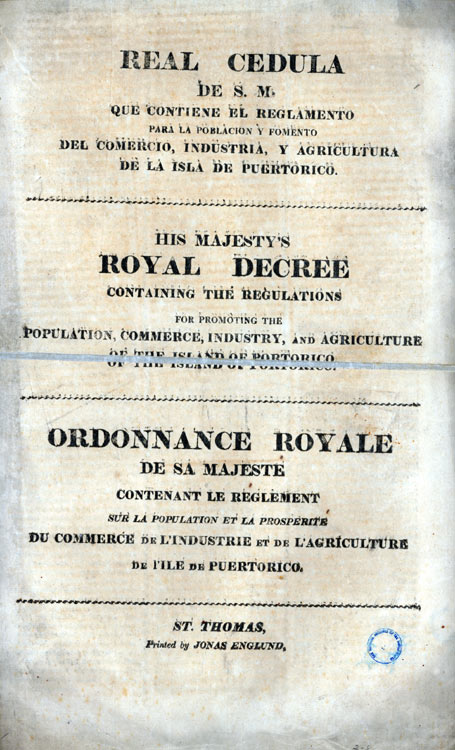
Royal Decree of Graces, 1815

The Spanish Crown had lost most of its possessions in the Americas. Its two remaining colonies were Cuba and Puerto Rico, who were demanding more autonomy and had pro-independence movements. The Spanish Crown issued the Royal Decree of Graces (Real Cédula de Gracias) which was promulgated on August 10, 1815, with the intention of attracting European settlers who were not of Spanish origin to the islands. The Spanish government, believing that the independence movements would lose their popularity, granted land and gave "Letters of Domicile" to German, Corsican, Irish, and French settlers who swore loyalty to the Spanish Crown and allegiance to the Roman Catholic Church. After a period of five years, settlers were granted a "Letter of Naturalization" that made them Spanish subjects.

== Religious influence ==
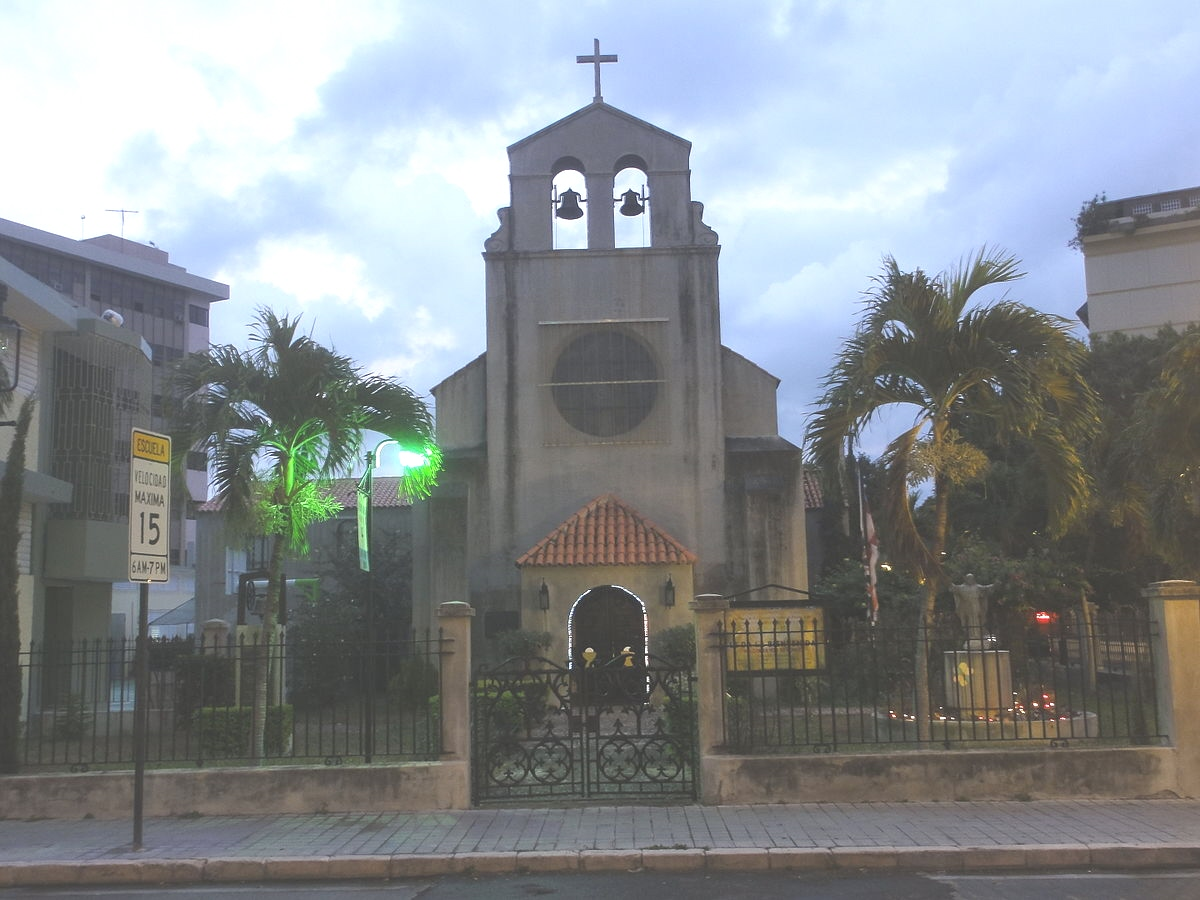
Iglesia Santísima Trinidad of Ponce

In the early 19th century, German immigrants introduced the "Christmas tree" to the Americas. The custom of adorning Christmas trees in Puerto Rico began in the city of Bayamón in 1866 when Dr. Agustín Stahl adorned a Christmas tree in his backyard. The people of Bayamón baptized his tree "El Árbol de Navidad del Doctor Stahl" (Dr. Stahl's Christmas tree).

In 1870, the Spanish Courts passed the "Acta de Culto Condicionado" (Conditional Cult Act), a law granting the right of religious freedom to all those who wished to worship another religion other than the Catholic religion.

The Anglican Church, the Iglesia de la Santísima Trinidad, was founded by German and English immigrants in Ponce in 1872. Among the original founders was G. V. Wiecher, who wrote to the Anglican Bishop of Antigua, W. W. Jackson, requesting a Spanish-speaking priest for their church. The church, which is located on Calle Marina (Marina Street) was the first non-Roman Catholic Church established in the Spanish Colonies and is currently an operating parish, as well as a tourist attraction. Albert and Betty Ostrom began training Puerto Ricans for pastoral service in the Lutheran Church of Puerto Rico from 1905 to 1931.

The Mennonite Church, which began with the Anabaptists in the German and Dutch-speaking parts of central Europe in the 16th century, also established congregations in Puerto Rico. The first Mennonite congregation in Puerto Rico, named Bethany (Betania) Mennonite Church, was founded in 1946 in Coamo, Puerto Rico. The first meetinghouse was a tabernacle-type church, built in 1946 and pastored by Paul Lauver. It was replaced in 1949 and by 1958 had 111 members. In 1957, a church was built in Cayey, Puerto Rico, called the Guavate Mennonite Church, replacing a smaller structure of the Guavate Mennonite Church which was founded in 1954 and destroyed in 1956.

There is a Mennonite School in Summit Hill and a Mennonite Church in San Juan. In the town of Aibonito, the Puerto Rican Mennonites established their first hospital and conference center. As of 1986 the conference had 893 members in 16 congregations with churches in Ponce and Bayamón.

== German cuisine ==
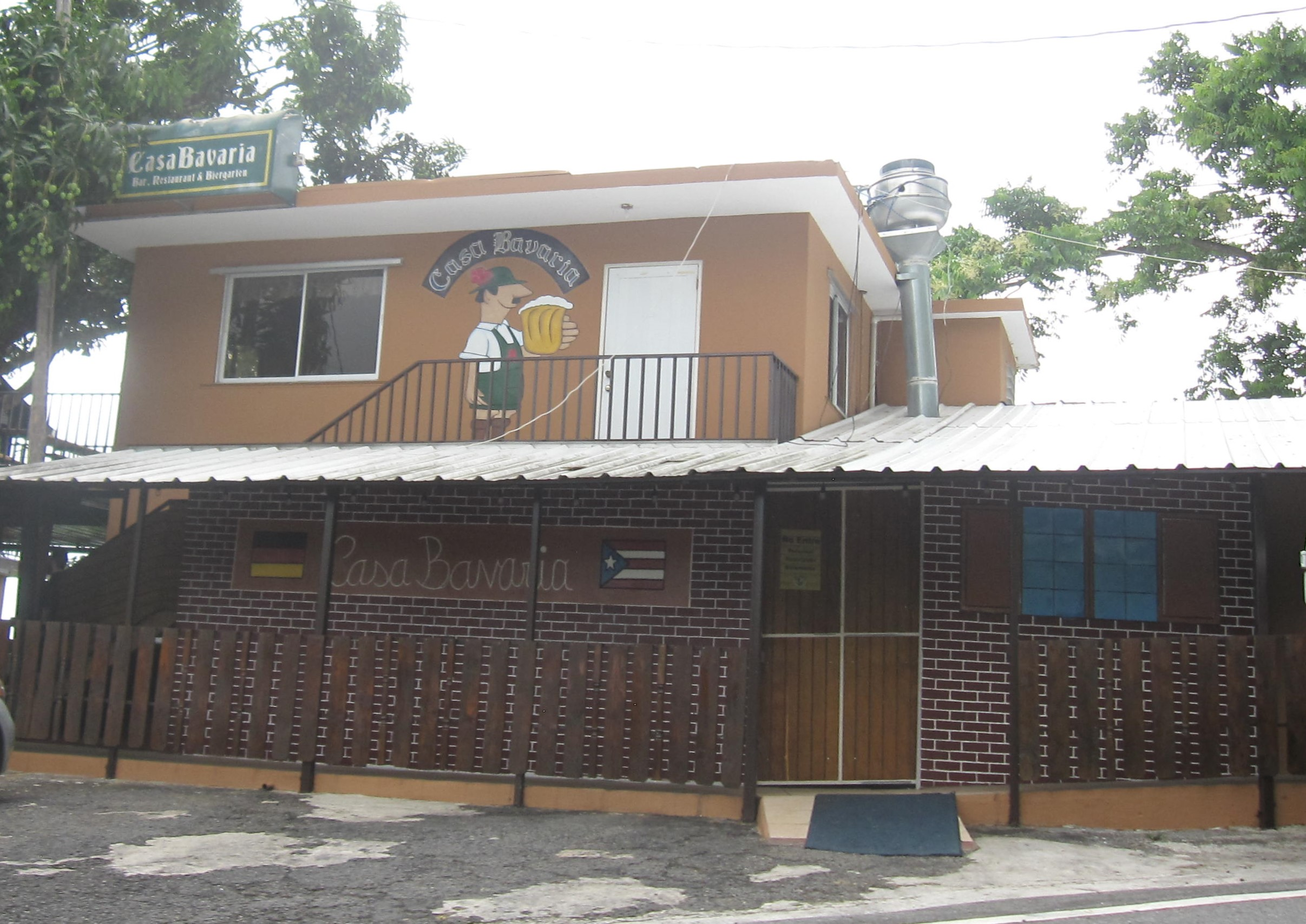
Casa Bavaria, a German restaurant on PR-155 in Morovis

Two commercial establishments in Puerto Rico have become gathering places for Puerto Rico's German community; the more than half-century old Zipperle's Restaurant in San Juan, and the Casa Bavaria restaurant located in the central mountain range (Cordillera Central) in Morovis, visited in 2009 by President Bill Clinton. Puerto Rican-German cuisine can also be found in Heidelberg Haus German Restaurant in Río Grande and Carolina and at Das Alpen Cafe, in the town of Rincón.

== Influence on the economy ==
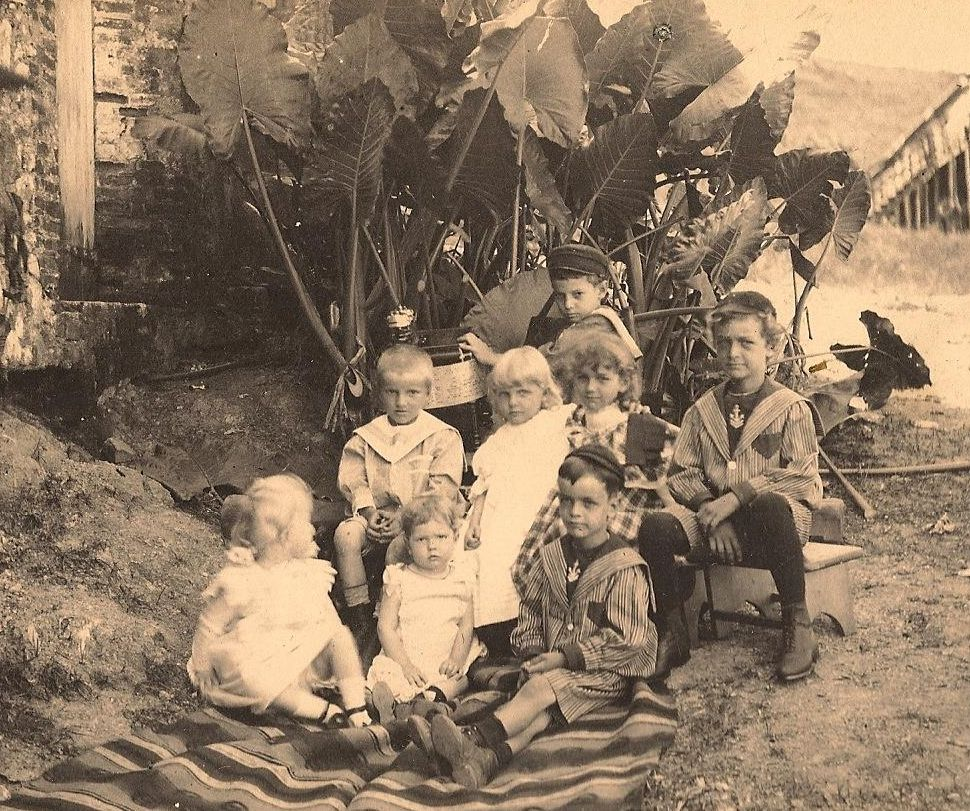
The Riefkohl and Verges children of Maunabo, Puerto Rico (c. 1890s)

The descendants of the first Spanish settlers owned most of the land in the coastal areas. Most prominently, Mallorcans, Galicians and Basques from the Iberian Peninsula settled in these areas. However, many well-to-do German immigrants also settled in this coastal area where they quickly established successful businesses in the coastal towns of Fajardo, Arroyo, Ponce, Mayagüez, Cabo Rojo, Quebradillas, Rincón, Arecibo and Aguadilla.

Other German immigrants who arrived in Puerto Rico to claim the free land that the Spanish government offered under the terms of the Spanish Royal Decree settled in the central mountainous areas of the island in towns such as Adjuntas, Aibonito, Lares, Utuado, San Sebastián and Ciales, among others where their descendants are today.

Many of these interior-island German settlers made their fortunes cultivating large agricultural enterprises in this sector and in some cases became owners of sugar cane and tobacco plantations. Others dedicated themselves to the fishing export industry in certain parts of Europe, such as Scandinavia. Among these German settlers in Puerto Rico was Johann Kifenhover, who in 1832 established a school in San Juan while other German settlers, such as Adolfo Rauschenplatt, founded sugarcane export businesses...

In 1915, a German immigrant named Walter Tischer married Carmen Vargas Alayón and opened a ballet school in San Juan which still exists today. Other German-founded businesses in Puerto Rico included Mullenhoff & Korber, Frite, Lundt & Co., Max Meyer & Co., Feddersen Willenk & Co., Korber Group Inc. and many others. One of Puerto Rico's largest advertising agencies was founded by the descendants of William Korber.

Unlike their countrymen who settled in the United States or in much larger South American colonial outposts in Brazil and Argentina in often isolated and close-knit communities, the German immigrants arriving in Puerto Rico moved quickly to marry into the most prosperous and upper-class families who were already the successful entrepreneurial class on the island. These descendants of earlier European immigrants (typically of Peninsular and Maritime Spanish Provinces, French, Dutch, Basque and Irish ancestry) helped the German immigrants adapt quickly to the language and customs of the island, thereby integrating themselves into the society of their new homeland.

== 20th century ==
On December 10, 1898, Puerto Rico was ceded by Spain to the United States under the terms of the 1898 Treaty of Paris, which ended the Spanish–American War. The former Spanish military bases were transferred to the United States and many of the American soldiers of German-American descent (and other European-Americans) stationed on the island easily established social contacts and very frequently married into middle class and upper-class families and established their homes there.

With the passage of the Jones Act of 1917 Puerto Ricans were required to serve in the Armed Forces of the United States. As a result, Puerto Ricans fought in Germany during World War II as members of Puerto Rico's 65th Infantry Regiment and continued to serve in Germany as members of the regular Army after the war on military bases throughout Germany.

Many of these Puerto Rican soldiers became fluent in German while stationed there and very frequently married German women who, as in the case of Dr. Úrsula Acosta, eventually moved to the island with their Puerto Rican husbands. Dr. Úrsula Acosta was a psychologist and retired professor of the University of Puerto Rico at Mayagüez. As a member of the Puerto Rican Genealogy Society, she has studied and written many works on genealogy and the German influence in Puerto Rico. Among her works are the following:

- Familias de Cabo Rojo, 1983 (with David Enrique Cuesta Camacho);
- Cabo Rojo: Notas para su historia (with Antonio "Mao" Ramos Ramírez de Arellano);
- New Voices of Old: Five Centuries of Puerto Rican Cultural History, 1987;
- Cofresí y Ducoudray: Dos hombres al margen de la historia, 1991.

By the beginning of the 20th century, many of the descendants of these earlier German settlers had become successful and prominent businessmen, philanthropists, educators/academicians, international entrepreneurs, and scientists and were among the pioneers of Puerto Rico's television and mass media and journalism industries of today.

== German influence in Puerto Rican and popular culture ==
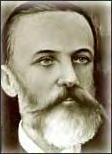
Dr. Agustín Stahl

Besides having distinguished careers in agriculture and the military, Puerto Ricans of German descent have made many other contributions to the Puerto Rican way of life. Their contributions can be found, but are not limited to, the fields of education, commerce, politics, science and entertainment.

Puerto Rican politics has been influenced by the contributions of politicians such as Federico Degetau, Erwin Kiess, Henry Neumann, Kimberly "Kimmie" Raschke, Larry Seilhamer Rodríguez, and the President of the Puerto Rican Senate Thomas Rivera Schatz. Carlos Vélez Rieckehoff, relative of the late Germán Rieckehoff, president of the Puerto Rican Olympic Committee, was the President of the New York City chapter of the Puerto Rican Nationalist Party in the 1930s.

Puerto Rican scientist Dr. Agustín Stahl worked in the fields of ethnology, botany and zoology. Dr. Sixto González Edick was named Director of the Arecibo Observatory, the world's largest single dish radio telescope.

Two brothers from the Riefkohl family had distinguished military careers. They were Frederick Lois and Rudolph W. Riefkohl. Rear Admiral Frederick Lois Riefkohl, U.S. Navy, was the first Puerto Rican to graduate from the United States Naval Academy and in World War I he also became the first Puerto Rican to be awarded the Navy Cross. His brother, Colonel Rudolph W. Riefkohl, U.S. Army, played an instrumental role in helping the people of Poland overcome the 1919 typhus epidemic. Major General Luis R. Estéves Völckers, U.S. Army, became the first Puerto Rican and Hispanic to graduate from the United States Military Academy in 1915. Estéves Völckers also organized the Puerto Rican National Guard. Colonel Virgil R. Miller, U.S. Army, was the Regimental Commander of the 442d Regimental Combat Team (RCT), a unit which was composed of "Nisei" (second generation Americans of Japanese descent), during World War II. He led the 442nd in its rescue of the Lost Texas Battalion of the 36th Infantry Division, in the forests of the Vosges Mountains in northeastern France. Rear Admiral George E. Mayer, U.S. Navy, was the first Hispanic Commander of the Naval Safety Center. He led an international naval exercise known as Baltic Operations (BALTOPS) 2003 from his flagship, the USS Vella Gulf (CG-72). It was the first time in the thirty-one year history of BALTOPS that the exercise included combined ground troops from Russia, Poland, Denmark and the United States.

== German Consular Presence in Puerto Rico ==
The Federal Republic of Germany maintains an official presence in Puerto Rico through the appointment of an Honorary Consul, who falls under the jurisdiction of the German Consul General in Miami. The current Honorary Consul, installed in a 2010 ceremony attended by Puerto Rico Secretary of State Kenneth McClintock and the Consul General, is Eric Stubbe.

== Surnames of the first German families in Puerto Rico ==
The German element in Puerto Rico is very much in evidence and German surnames such as Herger and Rieckehoff are common in the island. The following are the surnames of the first German families to settle in Puerto Rico:

Surnames of the first German families in Puerto Rico
Albrecht, Auerbach, Baltmann, Becker, Behn, Beidermeier, Bey, Bose, Bruekmann, Brugmann, Bultmann, Christiansen, Degener, Durer, von Eicken, Estronz, Elvers, Feurbach, Freidrich, Fritze, Fromm, Ganslandt, Haase, Hansen (adapted Yance), Hartmann, Hau, Herger, Hoffman, Hohl, Holbein, Kaufmann, Kleibring, Kifenhover, Koppel, Koppisch, Korber, Krammer, Kraus, Küchler, von Kupferschein (adapted to Cofresí), Kuster, Lameyer, Landau, Lange, Lassen, Lundt, Meyer, Miller, Mirande, Müllenhoff, Müller, Neumann, Niemeyer, Nitsche, Obergh, Oppenheim, Oppenheimer, Overmann/Obermann, Piterson, Pottharst, Raschke, Rauschenplar, Reichard, Reinhart, Remus, Rieckehoff, Riefkohl, Roehrs, Rohde, Roller, Sanders, Schiffer, Schimk, Schink, Schmidt, Schnabel, Schomburg, Schröder, Schultze, Schumacher, Spieker, Stahl, Steffens, Stege, Steinacher, Straussmann, Stroehling, Stubbe, Tischer, Voigt, Völckers, Volmar, Volkermann, Wedstein, Weidemann, Wiechers, Wilhelm, Willenk, Wirshing, Wolff, Zwinger.

== See also ==
- List of Puerto Ricans
- Cultural diversity in Puerto Rico
- Royal Decree of Graces of 1815
- German Confederation
- German Americans
