= Germán Rieckehoff =

Puerto Rican swimmer and nationalist

Germán Rieckehoff Sampayo
- Born: February 5, 1915; Vieques, Puerto Rico
- Died: September 2, 1997; During a medevac flight between Lausanne, Switzerland and San Juan, Puerto Rico
- Occupation: President of the Puerto Rico Olympic Committee
- Spouses: America Morales (1935-1939); Irma de Rieckehoff Sampayo
- Children: Laura, Aracelis, Angelita, Germán and Juan

Germán Rieckehoff Sampayo (February 5, 1915 – September 2, 1997) was a Puerto Rican nationalist of German descent, who served as president of the Puerto Rico Olympic Committee.

== Early years ==
Germán Rieckehoff Sampayo was born on February 5, 1915, in Vieques, Puerto Rico to Puerto Rican parents of German descent, who were poor farmers (jíbaros) who provided him with his basic needs and a good education. He was raised in a homestead owned by his parents. Their relative, Carlos Vélez Rieckehoff, was an important leader of the Puerto Rican Nationalist Party and he followed the cause of independence himself.

Rieckehoff had an athletic youth and when young he was an expert swimmer. In 1947, Rieckehoff founded an association of Viequenses to fight the presence of the United States Navy in his home-island of Vieques. He enrolled at the University of Puerto Rico School of Law where he earned his law degree and also earned a bachelor's degree in commercial administration from the University of Minnesota. It was during his university years that he became involved with the Puerto Rican Olympic Committee, eventually becoming the president of the committee.

In 1963, Germán Rieckehoff Sampayo founded the Equestrian Federation. He was a member of the 1966 Central American and Caribbean Games organizing committee.

== Puerto Rican Olympic Committee ==
In 1980, the United States boycotted the Olympic Games in Moscow, Soviet Union, protesting the Soviet Invasion of Afghanistan. Rieckehoff was against the boycott because he believed that politics should not get involved with sporting events. He was, therefore, denied economic support from the local government. Rieckehoff did however, manage to send one athlete to represent Puerto Rico. Alberto Mercado, became the only United States citizen to participate in the 1980 Olympics in the boxing event.

== The Barceló incident ==
In 1982, the Government of Puerto Rico, headed by then governor Carlos Romero Barceló, withheld economic support from the athletic delegation headed to Cuba, where the Central American and Caribbean Games were going to be held. The Puerto Rican Olympic Committee, under the leadership of Rieckehoff, had to appeal directly to the people for donations and were able to send the delegation.

== The Albergue Olimpico (Olympic Hostel) ==
Rieckehoff oversaw the construction of the "Olympic Village" in Carolina for the VIII Pan American Games, held in Puerto Rico in 1979 and he also oversaw the construction of the Albergue Olímpico (Olympic Hostel) in Salinas. He donated the land for the establishment of the "Regional Development Center".

== Later years ==
In the late 1980s, Rieckehoff traveled to Lausanne, Switzerland, and at the International Olympic Committee headquarters, he requested that the 2004 Olympic Games be held in San Juan, Puerto Rico. He pointed out that the success of the Pan American Games held in the island had proved that Puerto Rico had the facilities capable of holding an event such as the Olympics. The committee took his request into consideration but, after some years of studying the situation, decided for Athens, Greece to hold the games instead.

Rieckehoff indicated in a speech that he feared that sports professionals were gaining more control than the partisans of the Olympics. He also believed that the salaried professionals and administrators automatically thought that they knew what was best for the Olympics, when in reality the partisans were the ones with the proper knowledge.

On September 2, 1997, Germán Rieckehoff was in Lausanne, Switzerland when he fell ill. He was rushed on an ambulance plane with his wife, Irma Gonzalez, a sports leader in her own right, and son Germán, but died on the flight. His remains were returned to Puerto Rico, where he received a hero's funeral. He was survived by his wife, Irma, who died on May 3, 2006, their children, Angelita, Germán and Juan Adolfo Rieckehoff.

== Honors and recognitions ==
In his honor, the Albergue Olympico (Salinas, Puerto Rico) was renamed and is now known as the "Germán Rieckehoff Albergue Olympico", which also houses his gravesite, where his remains lie along with those of his wife. There is also a Germán Rieckehoff High School in Vieques and one in Virginia. On August 16, 2003, the Puerto Rican Legislature passed Law # 182 which established the "Germán Rieckehoff Sampayo Medal" of the Puerto Rican Legislative Assembly for excellence in sports. The medal is to be presented annually the sportsperson whose local or international accomplishments have helped keep the image of Puerto Rican sports among the best. Author Raul Mayo Santana wrote Rieckehoff's biography in a book titled El Juguete Sagrado: Germán Rieckehoff Sampayo Vida y leyenda.

== See also ==
- List of Puerto Ricans
- German immigration to Puerto Rico
