= Sönke Sönksen =

German equestrian (1938–2024)

Medal record

Equestrian

Olympic Games

Representing West Germany
Silver medal – second place	1976 Montreal	Team jumping

Sönke Sönksen (2 March 1938 – 15 November 2024) was a German equestrian and Olympic medalist. He competed in show jumping at the 1976 Summer Olympics in Montreal, and won a silver medal with the German team. Sönksen was born in Meldorf on 2 March 1938, and died on 15 November 2024, at the age of 86.
