= Michel Roche =

French equestrian

Medal record

Equestrian

Representing France

Olympic Games
Gold medal – first place	1976 Montreal	Team jumping

Michel Roche (8 September 1939 – 11 June 2004) was an equestrian from France, and an Olympic champion. He won a gold medal in show jumping, with the French team at the 1976 Summer Olympics in Montreal.
