= Rafael Pont Flores =

Puerto Rican journalist (1909–1980)

- Born: July 8, 1909; Aibonito, Puerto Rico
- Died: July 4, 1980; San Juan, Puerto Rico
- Occupation(s): Educator, Sportsman and Journalist

Rafael Pont Flores (July 8, 1909–July 4, 1980) was an educator, sportsman and journalist. He was from the town of Aibonito, Puerto Rico. He directed the "Escuela del Departamento de Instrucción Pública" Magazine. As a sport chronicler he was honored by being included in the Hall of the Immortals of the Crónica Deportiva en Puerto Rico. He collaborated with newspapers such as; El Mundo, El Imparcial and El Nuevo Dia. He published works such as El deporte en broma y en serio in 1951 and Un Puertorriqueño en España in 1969. He was a member of Phi Sigma Alpha fraternity.

== Legacy ==
In October 1982 a Multi-use Sports Complex inaugurated in the Bayamon Central University was dedicated in his honor and bears his name. Since 1982 the Overseas Press Club of Puerto Rico gives an annual "Rafael Pont Flores Prize" for excellence in sports journalism. There is also a public intermediate school in Aibonito that has his name. In the Albergue Olímpico in Salinas, there are two Conference Halls and a Sport Library that bear his name.
