= Carlos Vélez Rieckehoff =

Puerto Rican politician and independence advocate

- Born: November 18, 1907; Vieques, Puerto Rico
- Died: November 19, 2005 (aged 98); Vieques, Puerto Rico
- Political party: Puerto Rican Nationalist Party
- Movement: Puerto Rican Independence

Carlos Vélez Rieckehoff (November 18, 1907 – November 19, 2005) was the President of the New York chapter of the Puerto Rican Nationalist Party in the 1930s. In the 1990s Rieckehoff was among the protesters against the United States Navy's use of his birthplace, the island of Vieques, as a bombing range. He stood in front of the committee of the U.S. House of Representatives investigating the situation in Vieques and pleaded for the return of Vieques to the people of Puerto Rico.

== Early years ==
Rieckehoff was born Máximo Carlos Vélez Rieckehoff in Vieques, Puerto Rico. His maternal ancestors emigrated from Germany and settled in Vieques. He was raised in a homestead owned by his parents whom, although poor farmers ("jíbaros") were able to provide him with his basic needs and a good education. He was a first cousin of German Rieckehoff, a follower of the Puerto Rican independence movement himself, who became the president of the Puerto Rican Olympic committee.

== Nationalist ==
In the 1930s, Vélez Rieckehoff moved to New York City in search of employment. On one occasion a fifteen-year-old boy handed him a Puerto Rican Nationalist Party pamphlet and he became interested in the Puerto Rican independence movement. Rieckehoff attended the party meetings and eventually became the president of the New York chapter of the Nationalist Party.

Vélez Rieckehoff returned to Puerto Rico where he had the opportunity to become acquainted with Don Pedro Albizu Campos, the president of the Nationalist Party. With Albizu Campos he learned to have pride in his heritage and a willingness to sacrifice his life and safety, if necessary, for the cause of independence. On one occasion Vélez Rieckehoff attempted to seize a Puerto Rican flag, from an organization he felt was not in genuine sympathy with what the flag stood for. The police gave chase and he barely escaped with his life. In the 1940s, Vélez Rieckehoff found work in a sugar cane ranch. During this period of his life he met and later married Luisa Guadalupe, a young lady also from Vieques.

During World War II, the United States military purchased about two thirds of Vieques as an extension to the Puerto Rican mainland's Roosevelt Roads Naval Station. The original purpose of the base, though never implemented, was to provide a safe haven for the British fleet should Britain fall to Nazi Germany. Much of the land was bought from the owners of large farms and sugar cane plantations, who were paid a pittance for their homes and given twenty-four hours to evacuate. The purchases triggered the final demise of the sugar industry in Vieques. Many agricultural workers, who had no title to the land they occupied, were evicted. Among those who were forced out of their jobs was Vélez Rieckehoff who, together with his wife, went to New York to seek employment. In New York he drove a truck, worked as a night watchman, whatever work he could find while his wife, Luisa, worked in a factory.

After the war, the US Navy continued to use the island for military exercises, as a firing range, and a testing ground for bombs, missiles, and other weapons in a manner not unlike Kahoolawe in the Hawaiian Islands.

== Imprisonment ==
On May 21, 1948, a bill was introduced before the Puerto Rican Senate which would restrain the rights of the independence and Nationalist movements on the archipelago. The Senate, which at the time was controlled by the Partido Popular Democrático (PPD) and presided by Luis Muñoz Marín, approved the bill that day. This bill, which resembled the anti-communist Smith Act passed in the United States in 1940, became known as the Ley de la Mordaza (Gag Law) when the U.S.-appointed governor of Puerto Rico, Jesús T. Piñero, signed it into law on June 10, 1948.

Under this new law it became a crime to print, publish, sell, or exhibit any material intended to paralyze or destroy the insular government; or to organize any society, group or assembly of people with a similar destructive intent. It made it illegal to sing a patriotic song, and reinforced the 1898 law that had made it illegal to display the Flag of Puerto Rico, with anyone found guilty of disobeying the law in any way being subject to a sentence of up to ten years imprisonment, a fine of up to US$10,000 (equivalent to $134,000 in 2025), or both. According to Dr. Leopoldo Figueroa, the only non-PPD member of the Puerto Rico House of Representatives, the law was repressive and was in violation of the First Amendment of the US Constitution which guarantees Freedom of Speech. He pointed out that the law as such was a violation of the civil rights of the people of Puerto Rico.

In the 1950s, Nationalist meetings were outlawed. When Vélez Rieckehoff and other members of the party were detained by the police and asked about their political affiliations, he acknowledged that he was a member of the Nationalist Party. Rieckehoff was arrested, along with Don Pedro Albizu Campos and other Nationalists, and served three years in prison.

== Vieques situation ==
In 1980, Vélez Rieckehoff presented himself in front of the committee of the U.S. House of Representatives investigating the situation in Vieques. He pleaded for the return of Vieques to the people. He also stated that the very seizure of Puerto Rico through the Treaty of Paris of 1898 was null, since Puerto Rico had already been granted autonomy from Spain. He compared the invasion of Puerto Rico to the attempt of Russia to take over Finland in the 19th century. He pointed out that an international conference examining the issue had determined that "the rights of a country to national liberty is free from war conquests and diplomatic treaties."

The continuing postwar presence in Vieques of the United States Navy drew protests from the local community, angry at the expropriation of their land and the environmental impact of weapons testing. He stated the following:

"In addition to the material damage that the Navy has caused the geography of Vieques," Vélez declared, "it is depressing that an island endowed with singular beauty by the Creator is used as a training school to teach men to kill their fellow creatures. This act alone is contrary to the rules of Nature and Christian Humanism."

The locals' discontent was exacerbated by the island's parlous economic condition. In May 2003 the Navy withdrew from Vieques, and much of the island was designated a National Wildlife Refuge under the control of the United States Fish and Wildlife Service.

== Legacy ==
In 1979, Vélez Rieckehoff attended the International Conference in Support of Independence for Puerto Rico held in Mexico City as acting president of the Nationalist Party while the president of the party Jacinto Rivera was in Spain.

Vélez Rieckehoff was among a group of citizens who helped in the restoration of the Fuerte Conde de Mirasol (Count of Marisol Fort) of Vieques, under the direction of Robert Rabin the cofounder of the Historical Archives of Vieques.

On November 19, 2005 Vélez Rieckehoff died in Vieques. In December 2007, an art exhibit was held at the Museum Fuerte Conde de Mirasol, and the opening ceremonies of the museum were dedicated to the memory of Carlos Vélez Rieckehoff.

== See also ==
- Puerto Rican Nationalist Party Revolts of the 1950s
- List of Puerto Ricans
- German immigration to Puerto Rico
- Germán Rieckehoff
