= José María Rosillo =

Spanish equestrian

Personal information
- Nationality: Spanish
- Born: 15 May 1952 (age 72)

Sport
- Sport: Equestrian

José María Rosillo (born 15 May 1952) is a Spanish equestrian. He competed in the team jumping event at the 1976 Summer Olympics.
