= Rowland Fernyhough =

British equestrian

Personal information
- Nationality: British
- Born: 9 July 1954 (age 71)

Sport
- Sport: Equestrian

Rowland Fernyhough (born 9 July 1954) is a British equestrian. He competed in the team jumping event at the 1976 Summer Olympics.

Rowland is a former olympic and Nations Cup team member. He has also been Junior and Under 21 British Team Trainer which included winning double Gold in Portugal 2004.
