= Dennis Murphy (equestrian) =

American equestrian

Personal information
- Full name: William Dennis Murphy
- Born: October 24, 1944 (age 81) Birmingham, Alabama, United States

Sport
- Sport: Equestrian
Medal record
Equestrian
Representing the United States
Pan American Games
Gold medal – first place	1975 Mexico City	Team jumping

William Dennis Murphy (born October 24, 1944) is an American equestrian. He competed in the individual jumping event at the 1976 Summer Olympics.
