= Edgar Henri Cuepper =

Belgian equestrian

Medal record

Equestrian

Representing Belgium

Olympic Games
Bronze medal – third place	1976 Montreal	Team jumping

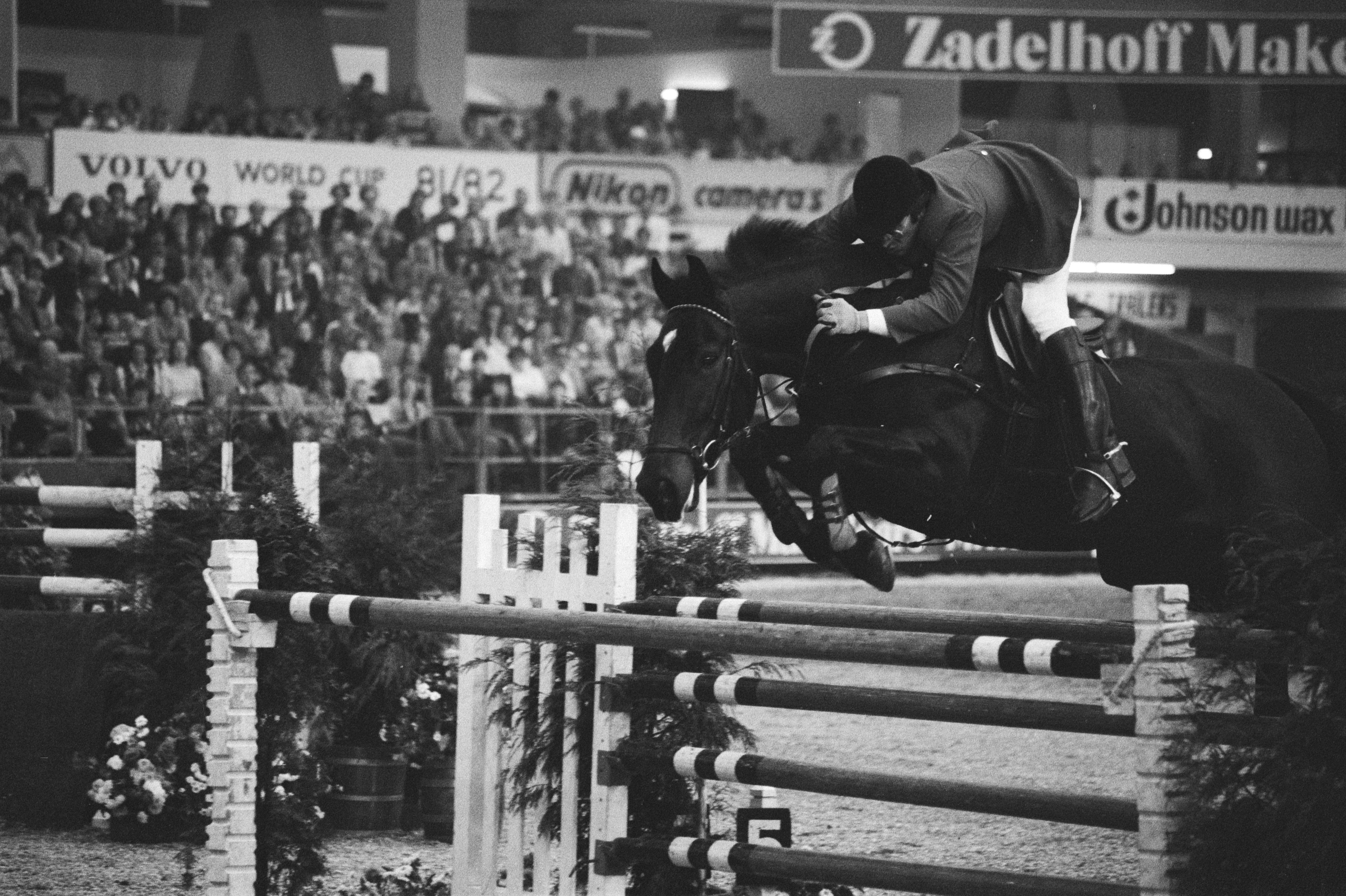
Edgar Henri Cuepper

Edgar Henri Cuepper (born 16 May 1949) is a Belgian equestrian and Olympic medalist. He was born in Eupen. He competed in show jumping at the 1976 Summer Olympics in Montreal, and won a bronze medal with the Belgian team.
