= Rudolph W. Riefkohl =

United States Army officer

Rudolph William Riefkohl
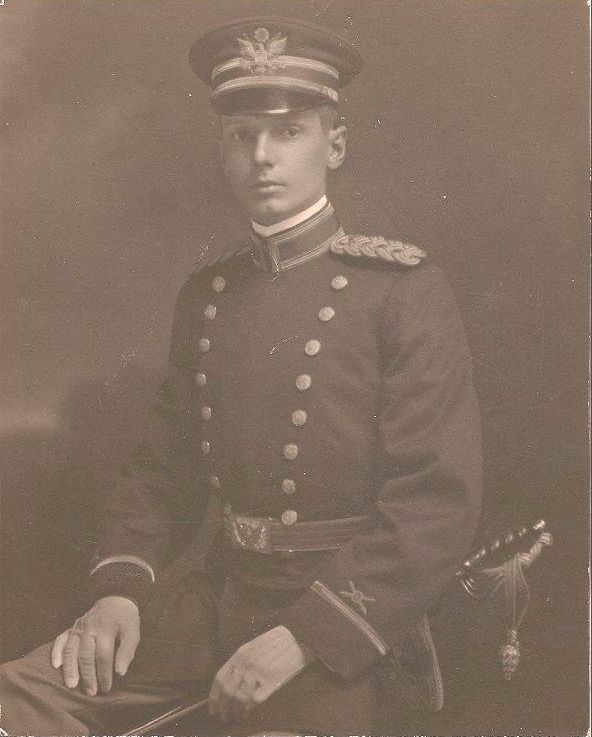
- Riefkohl in 1910
- Born: October 12, 1885; Maunabo, Puerto Rico
- Died: November 13, 1950 (aged 65); Surfside, Florida
- Burial place: Arlington National Cemetery
- Military career
- Allegiance: United States of America
- Branch: United States Army
- Service years: 1911–1945
- Rank: Colonel
- Conflicts: World War I: Meuse-Argonne Offensive; World War II

Colonel Rudolph William Riefkohl (October 12, 1885 – November 13, 1950), was an officer in the United States Army, who played an instrumental role in helping the people of Poland overcome the 1919 typhus epidemic.

== Early years ==
Riefkohl (birth name: Rudolph William Riefkohl Jaimieson) (documented as Rudolfo Otto Guillermo Riefkohl) was born and raised in the town of Maunabo, Puerto Rico. He was the oldest of five siblings born to Luis Riefkohl y Sandoz and Julia Jaimieson. His younger brother was Frederick Louis Riefkohl, the first Puerto Rican to graduate from the United States Naval Academy and to be awarded the Navy Cross for his actions in World War I. His brother Frederick retired from the Navy with the rank of Rear Admiral His other siblings were Helen, Emily and Louise Riefkohl.

=== A special map ===
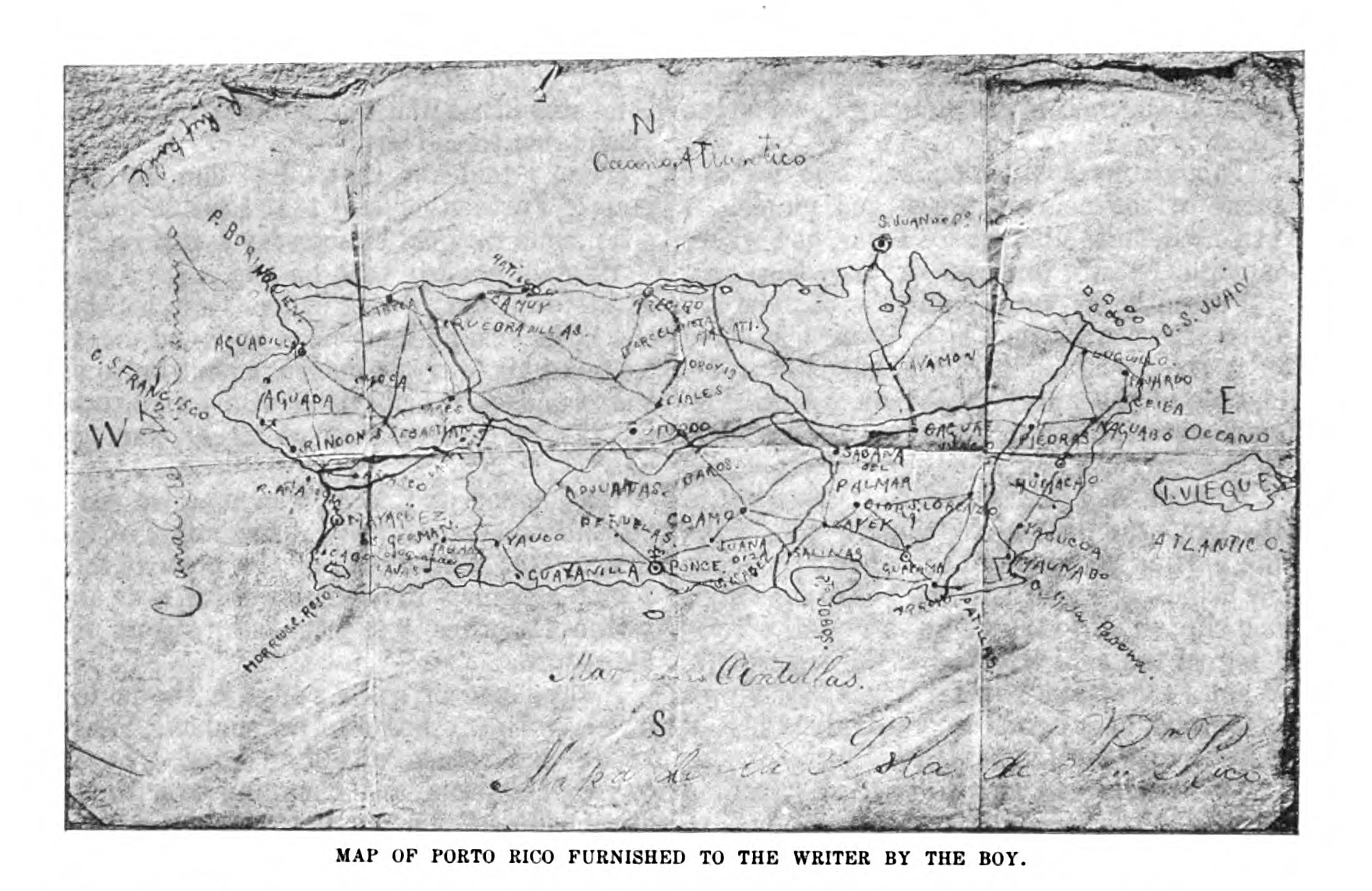
Map drawn by Rudolph Riefkohl and given to Edwin Emerson Jr.

In the spring of 1898, when Riefkohl was 14 years old, he became involved in a curious encounter with an American spy on the eve of the Spanish–American War. As recounted by the spy, Edwin Emerson Jr. in Century magazine in September 1898, Emerson, who was pretending to be a German journalist, had been given Riefkohl's father's name by the German consul in St. Thomas. Upon his arrival in the town of Maunabo he met young Rudolph and asked the lad in German if he had a map of Puerto Rico (Emerson had lost his). Riefkohl answered that he did, but it was decidedly too big for Emerson's use. Riefkohl returned home, not knowing that Emerson was a spy, and quickly drew another map with a depiction of the major ports and harbors of Puerto Rico. It is believed that Emerson gave Riefkohl's map to another spy, Lieutenant Henry Howard Whitney, who posed as a British crew member in the furnace-room of the merchant ship, and that Whitney gave the map to General Nelson A. Miles, thereby influencing the general's decision as to the disembarkation points for the invasion of Puerto Rico. A Photostat copy of Riefkohl's map was published in the Century article. After the war Riefkohl moved to the United States and concluded his secondary education in Concord, Massachusetts, serving as a cadet in the Sixth Regiment of the Massachusetts Volunteers, the same regiment that saw service in the southern areas of Puerto Rico in 1898 during the Puerto Rico Campaign. In 1910, Riefkohl earned a degree in mechanical engineering from the Massachusetts Institute of Technology (MIT).

== Military career ==
In 1911, Riefkohl joined the regular army and was commissioned a second lieutenant. When the United States declared war on Germany in World War I, he was assigned to the 63rd Heavy Artillery Regiment in France and actively participated in the Meuse-Argonne Offensive. According to the United States War Department, on April 1, 1918, Riefkohl served as Captain of Coastal Artillery at the Letterman Army Medical Center in Presidio of San Francisco, in California. His commanding officer was Colonel Henry Howard Whitney. Whitney asked him if he knew the Riefkohl family of Maunabo. Upon realizing that Riefkohl was the lad that drew the map which he, Whitney, had handed to General Miles during the Spanish–American War, they became good friends.

In June 1919, Col. Harry L. Gilchrist was informed to assist Poland in coping with its typhus epidemic. He emphasized the necessity of having trained personnel to deal with the emergency and to instruct the Poles with the use of the equipment being purchased. General John J. Pershing had decided that organizational matters should be handled by General William Durward Conner, who in turn instructed Lieutenant Colonel Frank E. Estes, of the Army Service Corps, to mount the expedition.

Estes then dispatched Riefkohl, who was then a major, and Captain Pumhrey to Brest, France where they were instructed to assemble a new command. The Army Service Corps at Brest was organized into two separate units and later reorganized into a battalion commanded by Riefkohl. Riefkohl's battalion was successful in its mission and played an instrumental role helping the Poles overcome their epidemic. However, since the Red Army was approaching their command in what is known as the Polish–Soviet War, Riefkohl and his comrades were transferred to Danzig, which was under British control. Riefkohl was awarded the Polish Commemorative Medal for the War of 1919–21 and transferred to United States Army of Occupation in Germany.

Riefkohl was among the Army officers who attended and graduated from the third course of the Army Industrial College which was held from February 2, 1925, to June 30, 1925 He also attended and graduated from the Army War College at Carlisle Barracks in Carlisle, Pennsylvania and Quartermaster Corps School of the French Army in France. Riefkohl obtained a master's degree in business administration from Harvard Business School in 1935. As war broke out in Europe, in 1939, he was instrumental in the planning and construction of Punto Borinquen (Ramey) Air Base in Aguadilla.

During World War II Riefkohl served in various administrative positions, among them: director of supply of the 3rd Service Command at Baltimore, director of business administration at Quartermaster Corps School and Assistant Commandant of the Army Industrial college in Philadelphia. Riefkohl retired as a colonel in the United States Army Corps of Engineers in 1945.

== Later years ==
Riefkohl and his wife moved to Surfside, Florida. There he became a member of the Surfside City planning board and of the Military Order of the World War. He ran for mayor of Surfside and was elected in May 1949.

Riefkohl's term as mayor was short lived because he soon fell ill and on November 13, 1950, died of a heart attack. He was buried with full military honors at Arlington National Cemetery. Riefkohl was survived by his wife Aimee Preston.

== Awards and decorations ==
Among Riefkohl 's military awards and decorations are the following:

- World War I Victory Medal
- Army of Occupation of Germany Medal
- American Campaign Medal
- European-African-Middle Eastern Campaign Medal
- World War II Victory Medal

Foreign award

- Polish Commemorative Medal for the War of 1919–21

== See also ==
- List of Puerto Ricans
- List of Puerto Rican military personnel
- Puerto Ricans in World War I
- Puerto Ricans in World War II
- German immigration to Puerto Rico
