= Ursula Acosta =

Founding member of the Puerto Rican Genealogical Society

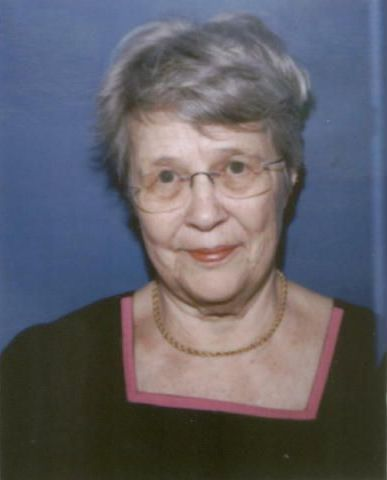
- Founding member of the Puerto Rican Genealogical Society
- Born: January 14, 1933; Hanover, Weimar Republic
- Died: September 10, 2018 (aged 85); San Germán, Puerto Rico
- Occupations: author and psychologist (She was a retired professor of the University of Puerto Rico)

Notes
- Dr. Acosta served in the chair of the appeals board of the Selective Service for Puerto Rico for 20 years.

Ursula Acosta (née Schmidt; January 14, 1933 – September 10, 2018) was one of the founding members of the Puerto Rican Genealogical Society, who studied and written many works on the subject. She was also a psychologist and retired professor of the University of Puerto Rico at Mayagüez.

== Early years ==
Acosta was born in Hanover, Germany to Hans Schmidt and Irma Ulrich. In 1935, her family moved to Leipzig, where she received her primary education. In 1947 her family relocated and moved to Dieburg. In 1952, she met Corporal Sebastián Acosta Ronda, a Puerto Rican in the United States Army who was stationed in Germany. They became romantically involved and wanted to marry, however her father recommended that she finish school first. Corporal Acosta Ronda returned to his homeland and Ursula continued in school until 1953, when she finished with the Abitur (final exams) at the Gymnasium (college prep school) in Dieburg.

== Puerto Rico ==
Corporal Acosta Ronda was honorably discharged from the Army in May 1953 and making use of his G.I. Bill studied chemistry at the University of Puerto Rico at Mayagüez campus. Acosta applied for her immigration papers and upon receiving them moved to Puerto Rico. A few days after her arrival to the island she married Sebastián Acosta Ronda. She lived in the city of Mayagüez where her oldest son, Hans, was born. In 1959, the family relocated to Darmstadt, Germany where her husband pursued his graduate studies.

== Educator ==
The family returned to Puerto Rico and had resided in Hormigueros, Puerto Rico since 1967, year in which Acosta enrolled in the University of Puerto Rico. Acosta worked full-time as a teacher at private schools and in 1971 earned her bachelor's degree in Social Sciences. During the next two years, she continued to work as an educator and during the weekends pursued her master's degree in counseling. In 1973, she earned her master's degree at the Río Piedras campus of the University of Puerto Rico and that same year she began to teach at that institution's Mayagüez campus. During her summers she took courses towards her Ph.D. at the Johannes Gutenberg University of Mainz in Germany and in 1979 earned her Ph.D. in social psychology with minors in linguistics and sociology.

== Genealogist ==
Acosta returned to Puerto Rico and in 1980 she became interested in genealogy. On April 29, 1989 she became one of the founding members of the Sociedad Puertorriqueña de Genealogía (Puerto Rican Genealogical Society). The society's aim is the following:

- To foster the scientific study of Puerto Rican Genealogy
- To cooperate with the preservation of historic documents of Puerto Rico.
- To promote educational activities (Seminars, Conferences, Exhibitions, etc.) related to the search of the genealogical roots of Puerto Ricans.

== Written works ==
Acosta had also authored many articles on psychology and other topics which include Puerto Rican history and which have been published in various publications such as The San Juan Star, Atenea and so on. Among the literary works which she has either authored or co-authored are the following:

- "Familias de Cabo Rojo", (Families of Cabo Rojo), 1983, by Dr. Ursula Acosta and David Enrique Cuesta Camacho- This publication covers the Genealogies of 16 families of Cabo Rojo, Puerto Rico. It covers the 18th and 19th centuries.
- "Cabo Rojo: Notas para su historia" (Cabo Rojo: Notations for its history), by Dr. Ursula Acosta and Antonio "Mao" Ramos Ramírez de Arellano
- "Cofresí y Ducoudray: Dos hombres al margen de la historia" (Cofresi and Ducoudray, two men at the margin of history), Editorial Edil, Río Piedras, PR, 1991, by Dr. Ursula Acosta
- "New Voices of Old: Five Centuries of Puerto Rican Cultural History", 1987, by Dr. Ursula Acosta - an anthology of interviews, both real and imaginary, conducted by the author to Puerto Ricans covering various centuries.

== Later years ==
Acosta was a member of various organizations, among them the American Psychological Association, Asociación Histórica de Puerto Rico (Historical Association of Puerto Rico), National Genealogical Association and Der Herold. She served in the chair of the appeals board of the Selective Service for Puerto Rico for 20 years. In 1995, Acosta retired from teaching at the University of Puerto Rico at Mayagüez. Due to her husband's ill health, she retired from most of her professional activities. She continued to reside in the town of Hormigueros, Puerto Rico. Besides her son Hans, who was born in Puerto Rico, the couple had two other children, Dennis and Peter who were born in Germany. On September 10, 2018, she died while hospitalized in San Germán, Puerto Rico.

== See also ==
- List of Puerto Ricans
- German immigration to Puerto Rico
