= Robert Ridland =

American equestrian

Personal information
- Nationality: American
- Born: November 7, 1950 (age 75) Pasadena, California, United States

Sport
- Sport: Equestrian

Robert Ridland (born November 7, 1950) is an American equestrian. He competed in the team jumping event at the 1976 Summer Olympics.
