= Hubert Parot =

French equestrian

Medal record

Equestrian

Representing France

Olympic Games
Gold medal – first place	1976 Montreal	Team jumping

Hubert Parot (23 May 1933 – 14 January 2015) was an equestrian from France and Olympic champion. He won a gold medal in show jumping with the French team at the 1976 Summer Olympics in Montreal.
