= Luis Rechani Agrait =

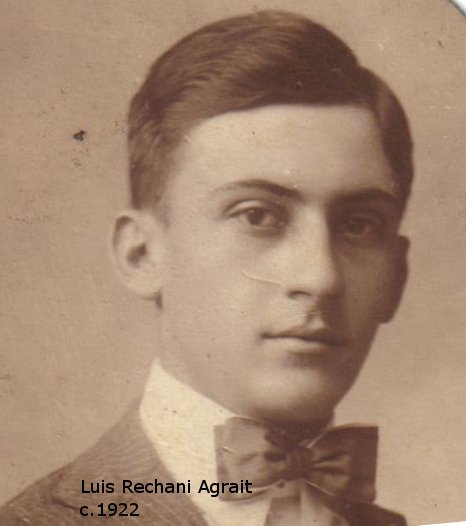
- Born: June 22, 1902; Aguas Buenas, Puerto Rico
- Died: December 12, 1994 (aged 92); Carolina, Puerto Rico
- Education: Harvard University
- Occupations: poet, playwright, journalist
- Spouse: Belén Zequeira
- Children: Belén, Mercedes, María Cecilia
- Writing career
- Literary movement: Generation of the 1930s

Luis Paulino Rechani Agrait (June 22, 1902 in Aguas Buenas, Puerto Rico – December 12, 1994 in Carolina, Puerto Rico), was a Puerto Rican poet, journalist, and playwright.

After schooling in Aguas Buenas and Río Piedras, Rechani Agrait moved to the US to study Natural Sciences at Harvard and Richmond. Returning to Puerto Rico in 1924, he worked on various newspapers (particularly El Mundo and El Nuevo Día) and in teaching.

His literary work can be situated as part of the "Generation of the 1930s," and paid particular attention to social and historical issues.

He died on December 12, 1994 at age 92 and was buried at Buxeda Memorial Park in Río Piedras, Puerto Rico.

== Publications ==
- Páginas de color de rosa: Libro de lectura para segundo año (1928) (book intended for second graders)
- Una nube en el viento (1929) (poems for children)

== Plays ==
- Mi señoría (1940)
- Todos los ruiseñores cantan (1964)
- ¿Cómo se llama esta flor? (1965)
- Tres piraguas en un día de calor (1970) – an evening of three-one act comedies (El Tesoro, La Compañía, El Pececito Dorado)
- Llora en el atardecer la fuente (1971)
- ¡Oh, dorada ilusión de alas abiertas! (1978)
- El extraño caso del señor Oblomós (1981) – based on the novel Oblonov, by Russian writer Ivan A. Goncharov

== See also ==
- List of Puerto Rican writers
- List of Puerto Ricans
- Puerto Rican literature
