= Juan Rieckehoff =

Puerto Rican equestrian

Personal information
- Nationality: Puerto Rican
- Born: May 20, 1953
- Died: May 11, 2021 (aged 67)

Sport
- Sport: Equestrian

Juan Adolfo Rieckehoff (May 20, 1953 – May 11, 2021) was a Puerto Rican equestrian. He competed in the individual jumping event at the 1976 Summer Olympics. He was the son of Germán Rieckehoff, former president of the Puerto Rico Olympic Committee.
