= François Mathy =

Belgian equestrian (born 1944)

Medal record

Equestrian

Representing Belgium

Olympic Games
Bronze medal – third place	1976 Montreal	Show jumping
Bronze medal – third place	1976 Montreal	Team jumping

François Mathy (born 31 December 1944) is a Belgian equestrian and Olympic medalist. He was born in Brussels. He competed in show jumping at the 1976 Summer Olympics in Montreal, and won a bronze medal with the Belgian team, as well as a bronze medal in the individual contest.
