= Jits Bakker =

Dutch visual artist (1937–2014)

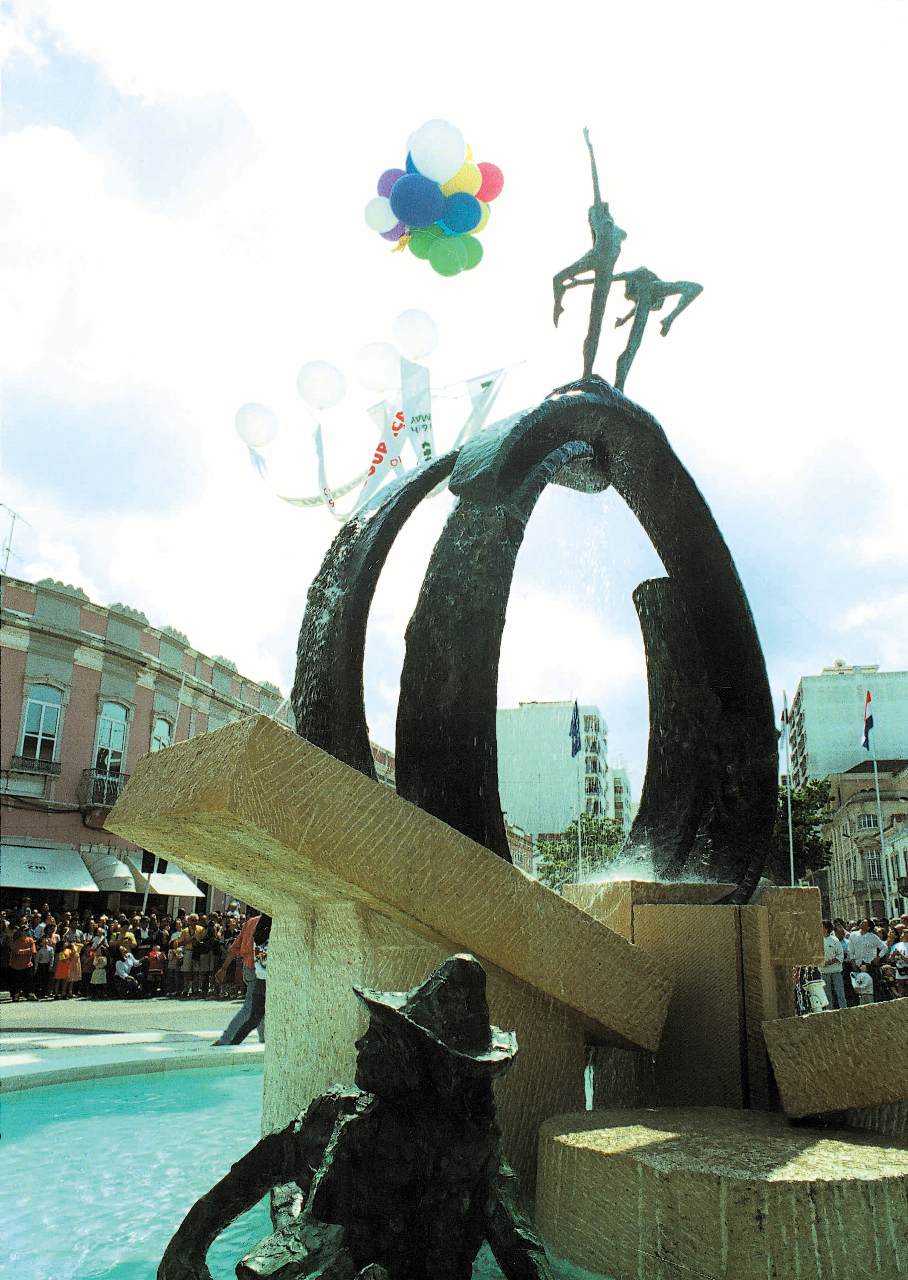
- Sundance (1998), Loulé Algarve-Portugal
- Born: Willem Frederik Bakker; July 6, 1937
- Died: June 5, 2014 (aged 76)
- Website: jitsbakkercollectie.com

Willem Frederik "Jits" Bakker (1937 – 2014) was a Dutch sculptor, painter, visual artist, watercolorist, draftsman, and silversmith.

== Career ==
Jits Bakker was a prolific artist whose career spanned over five decades. Primarily a sculptor, working with bronze and marble, he was also skilled in painting, glasswork, graphic design, and jewelry making. His work earned him international recognition through commissions from both the Netherlands and other countries.

Bakker's artistic style ranged from expressive and energetic to quiet and introspective. The human form was his central theme, and he drew inspiration from classical mythology, music, dance, and sports.

== Honors ==
Jits Bakker received numerous honors and accolades throughout his career, including:

- Ereburger (Honorary Citizen) of Turku, Finland (2008)
- Ereburger (Honorary Citizen) of Renkum, Netherlands (2014)
- Ereburger (Honorary Citizen) of Loulé, Portugal (2006)

His artwork was also collected by various world leaders and prominent figures, including members of the British and Dutch royal families.

Bakker's achievements extended beyond his sculptures. A film portrait titled "Bronze Alive" about Bakker, directed by Tom Manders Jr., won the De Golden Image Award in New York in 1978. He also received the Movado Museum Prize in 1995.

Jits Bakker was awarded the International Olympic Committee's (IOC) "Sport and Art Award" posthumously in December 2014. This award acknowledged his work in promoting the Olympic values and their importance to sports.

== Gallery ==
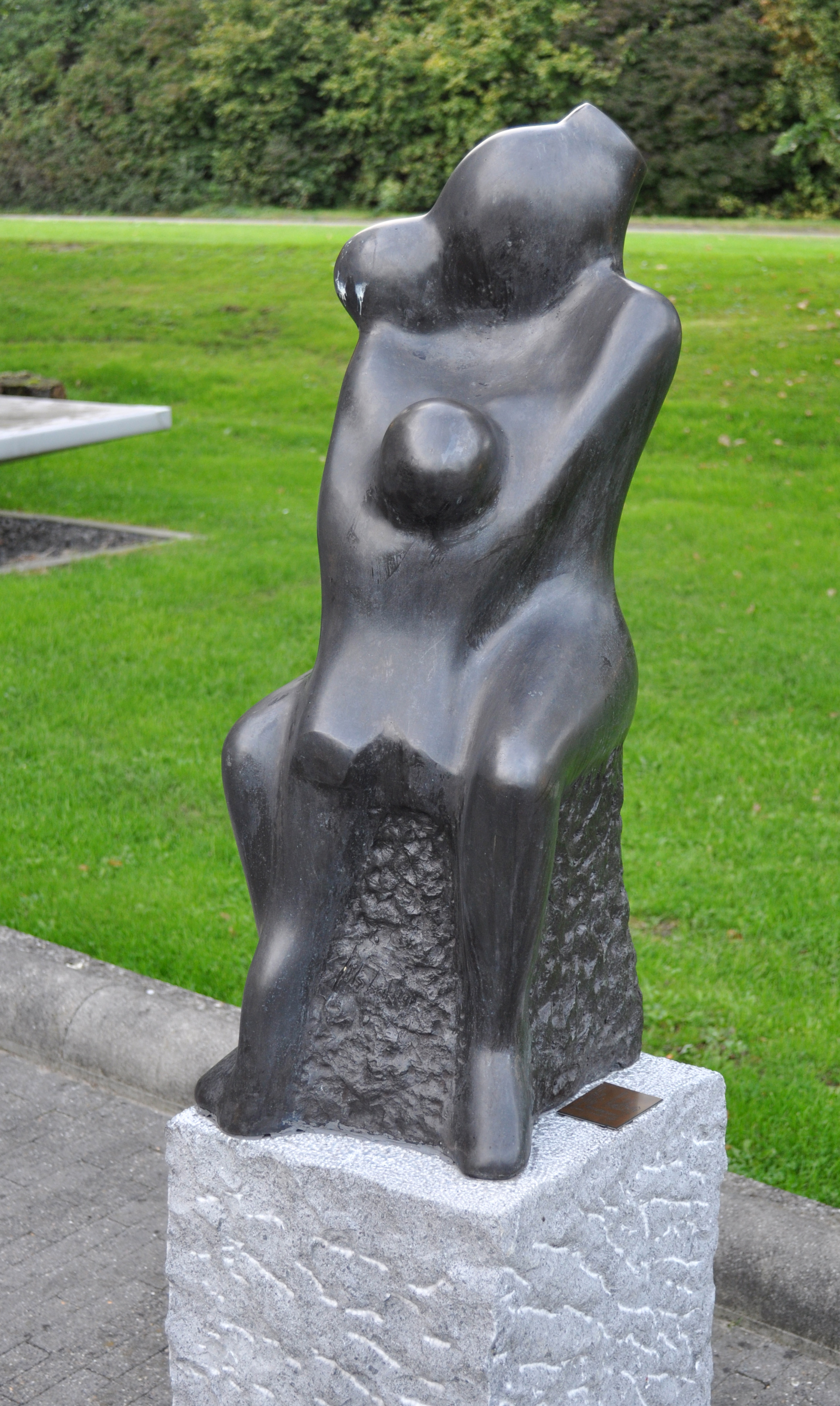
Peuters (1999), Utrecht

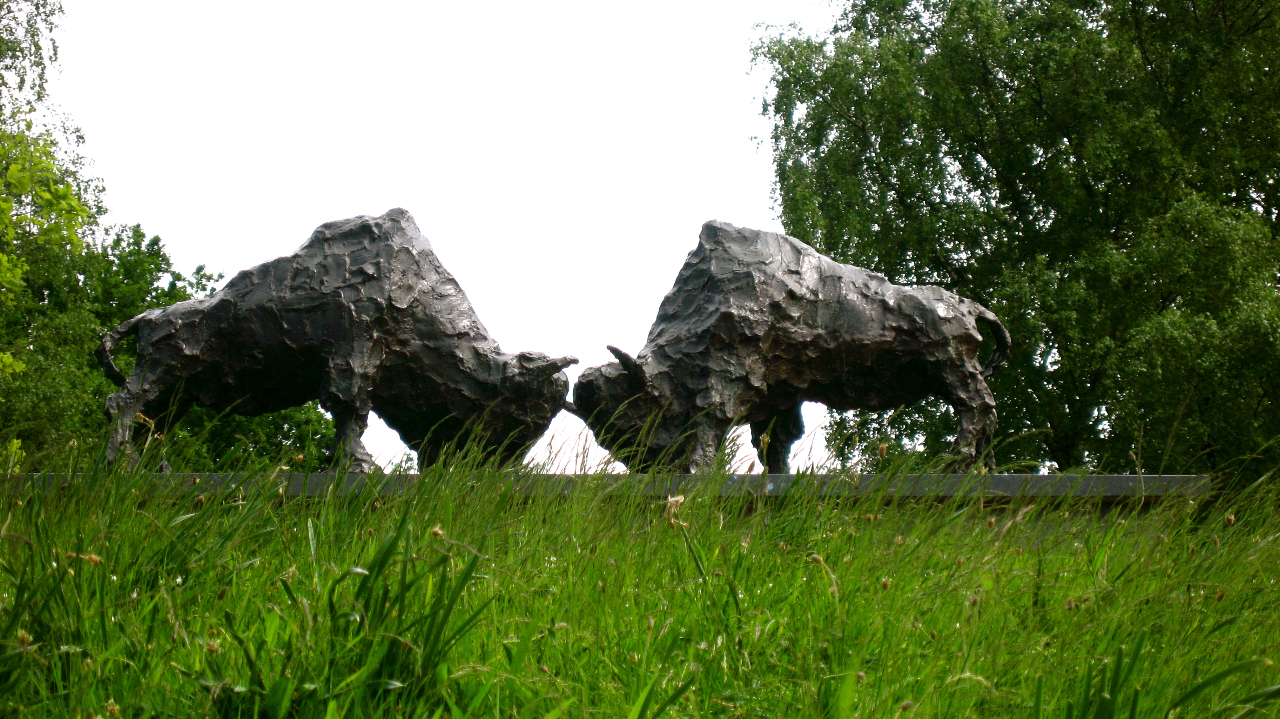
Krachtmeting (1974), Ede

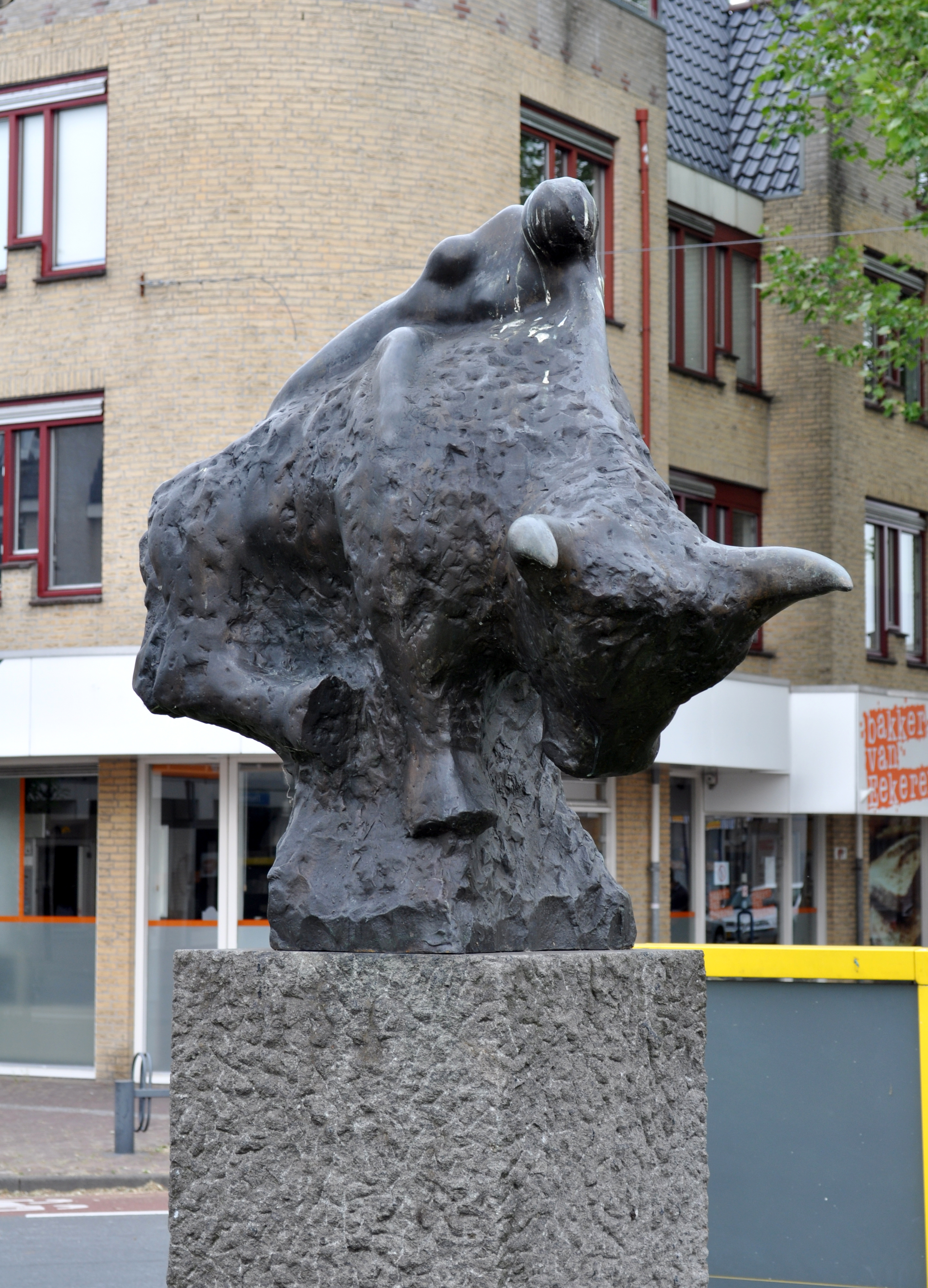
Europa en de Stier (1998), De Bilt

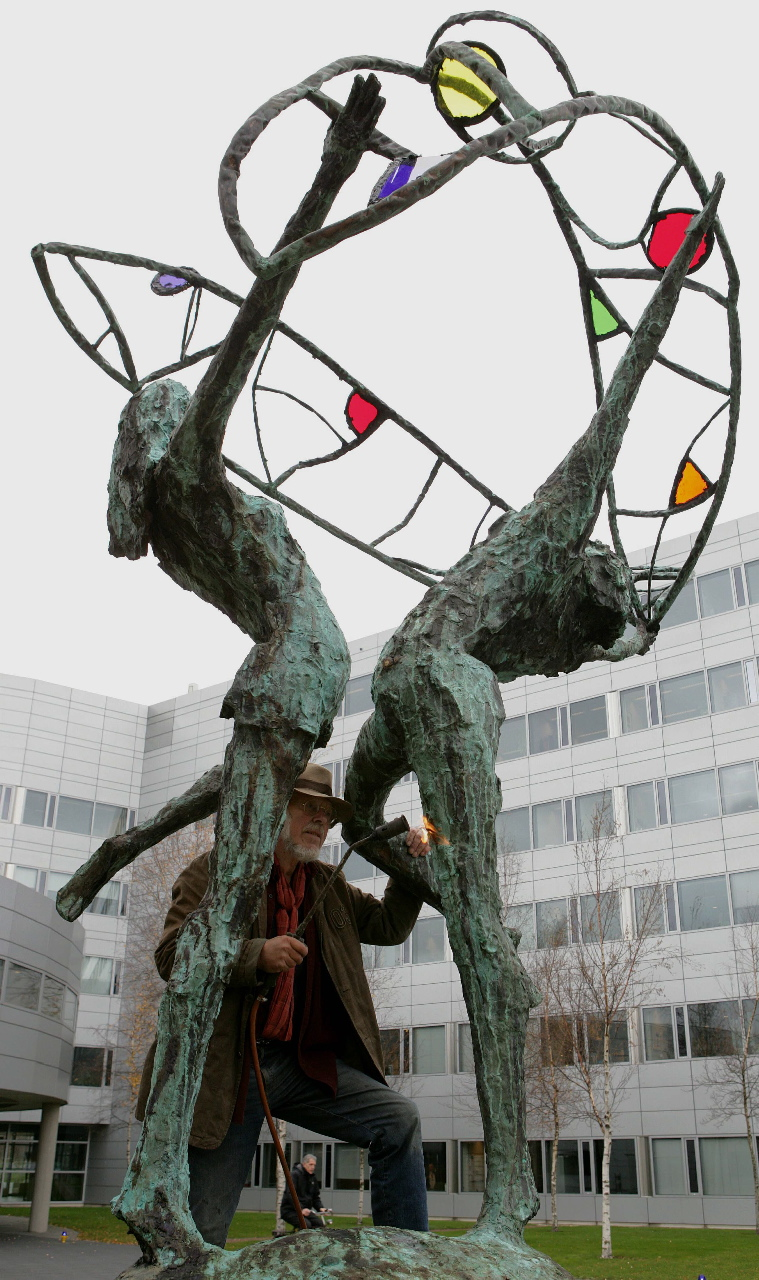
Sun in the Wings (2008), Amsterdam Schiphol Airport

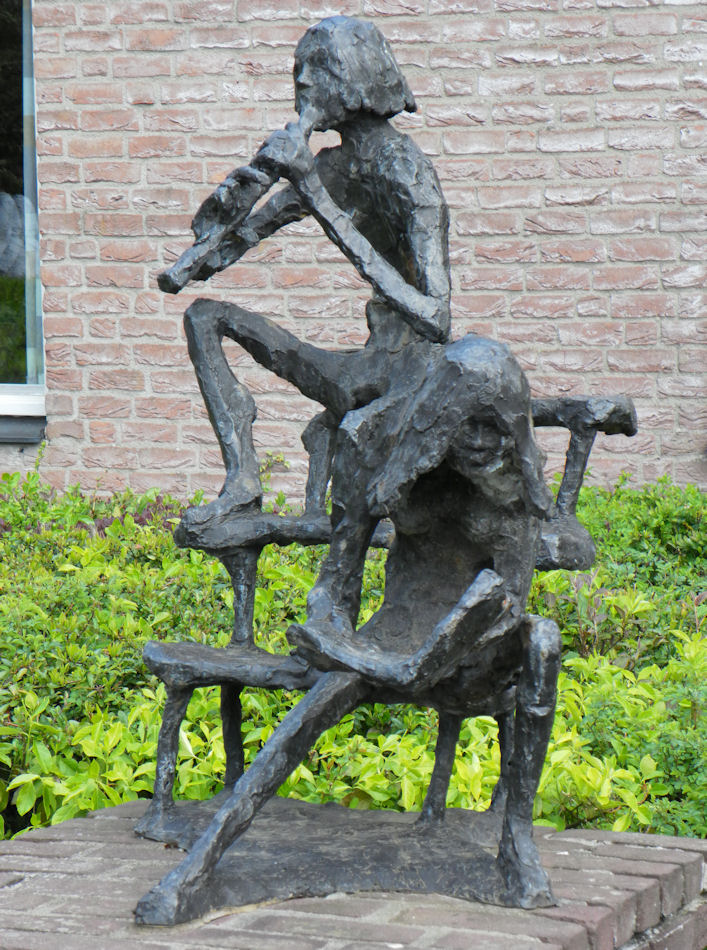
Pauze (1982), Provincial Library Center in Assen

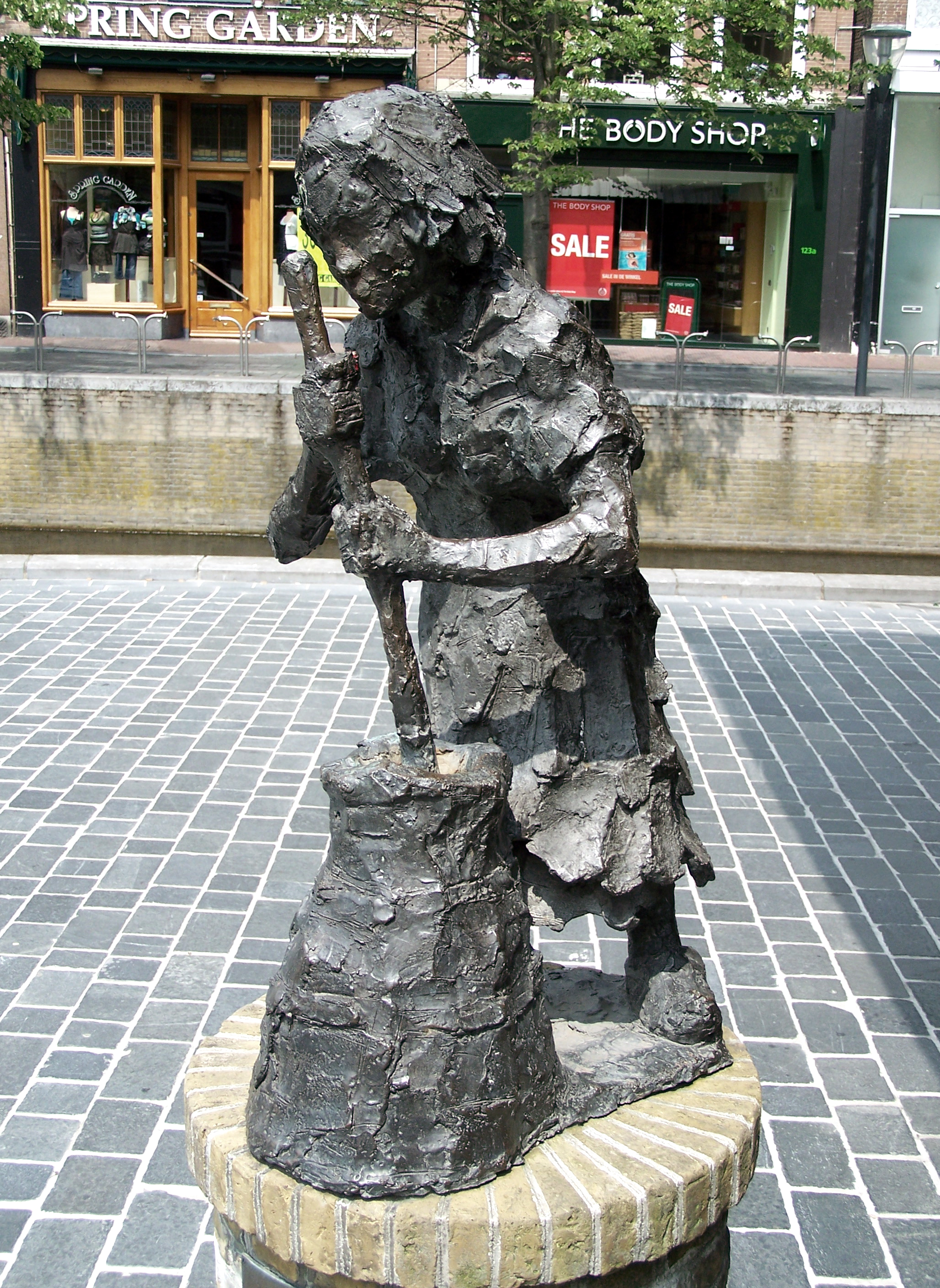
Karnster (1979), Nieuwstad behind the Waag, in Leeuwarden
