= Johan Heins =

Dutch equestrian

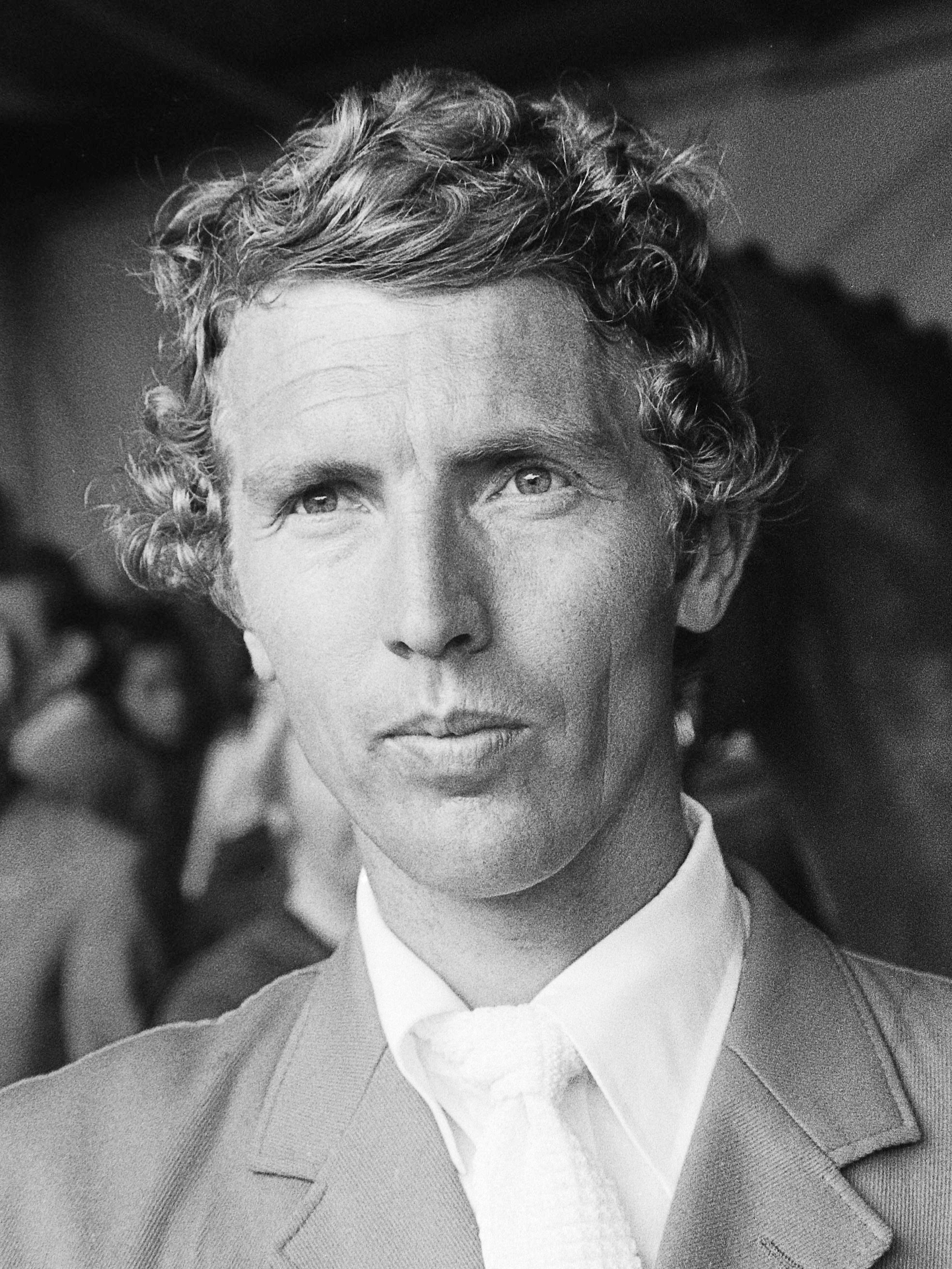
- Johan Heins in 1980

Personal information
- Nationality: Dutch
- Born: 31 July 1947 (age 77); Havelte, Netherlands

Sport
- Sport: Equestrian

Johan Heins (born 31 July 1947) is a Dutch equestrian who competed in the team jumping event at the 1976 Summer Olympics.
