= Jan-Olof Wannius =

Swedish equestrian

Personal information
- Nationality: Swedish
- Born: 15 May 1942 (age 82); Stockholm, Sweden

Sport
- Sport: Equestrian

Jan-Olof Wannius (born 15 May 1942) is a Swedish equestrian. He competed in the individual jumping event at the 1976 Summer Olympics.
