= Hirokazu Higashira =

Japanese equestrian

Personal information
- Nationality: Japanese
- Born: 7 September 1946 (age 78); Kyoto, Japan

Sport
- Sport: Equestrian

Hirokazu Higashira (born 7 September 1946) is a Japanese equestrian. He competed at the 1976 Summer Olympics and the 1992 Summer Olympics.
