= Rob Eras =

Dutch equestrian

Personal information
- Full name: Robertus Wilhelmus Cornelis Eras
- Nationality: Dutch
- Born: 6 April 1954 (age 71); Goirle, Netherlands

Sport
- Sport: Equestrian

Robertus Wilhelmus Cornelis Eras (born 6 April 1954) is a Dutch equestrian. He competed in two events at the 1976 Summer Olympics.
