= Alfonso Segovia =

Spanish equestrian

Personal information
- Nationality: Spanish
- Born: 6 July 1945 (age 79); Cádiz, Spain

Sport
- Sport: Equestrian

Alfonso Segovia (born 6 July 1945) is a Spanish equestrian. He competed at the 1972 Summer Olympics and the 1976 Summer Olympics.
