= Luis Razo =

Mexican equestrian

Personal information
- Nationality: Mexican
- Born: 25 September 1940 (age 85)

Sport
- Sport: Equestrian
Medal record
Equestrian
Representing Mexico
Pan American Games
Silver medal – second place	1975 Mexico City	Team jumping

Luis Razo (born 25 September 1940) is a Mexican equestrian. He competed in two events at the 1976 Summer Olympics.
