= Debbie Johnsey =

British equestrian

Personal information
- Nationality: British
- Born: 3 July 1957 (age 67); Newport, Wales

Sport
- Sport: Equestrian

Debbie Johnsey (born 3 July 1957) is a British equestrian. She competed in two events at the 1976 Summer Olympics.
