= Henk Nooren =

Dutch equestrian

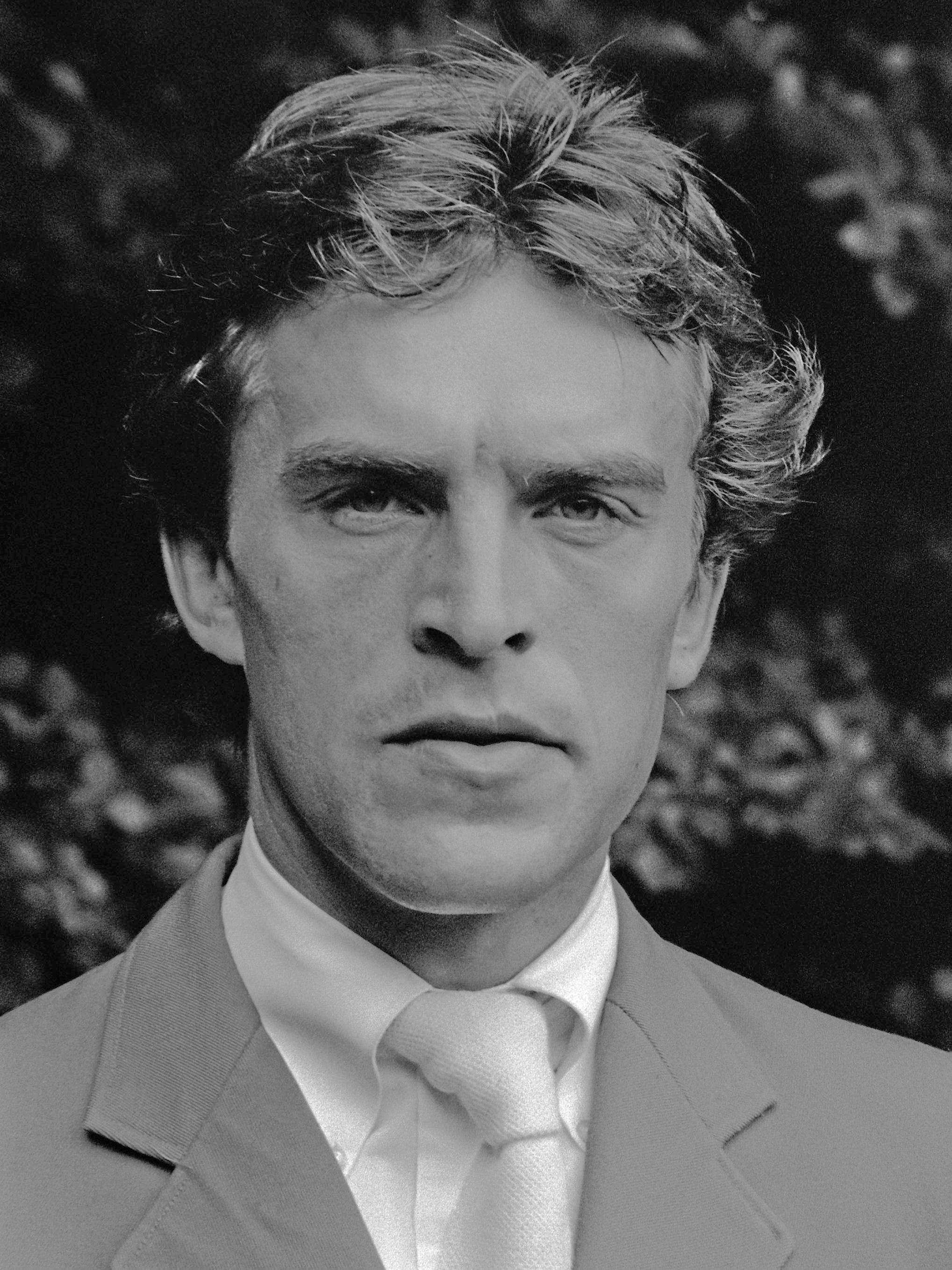
- Henk Nooren in 1980

Personal information
- Nationality: Dutch
- Born: 23 August 1954 (age 70); Bergen, Netherlands

Sport
- Sport: Equestrian

Henk Nooren (born 23 August 1954) is a Dutch equestrian. He competed in two events at the 1976 Summer Olympics.
