= Equestrian events at the 1980 Summer Olympics =

Equestrian at the Games of the XXII Olympiad
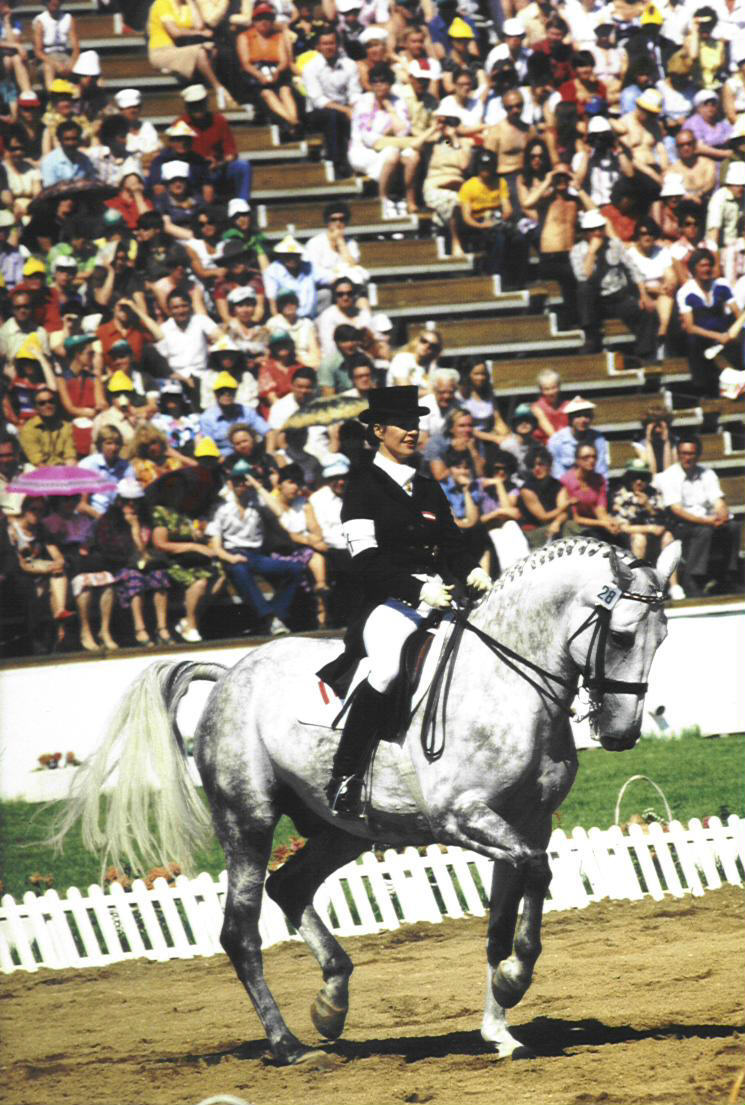
- Individual gold medalists in dressage, Elisabeth Theurer and Mon Cherie
- Venue: Trade Unions' Equestrian Complex; Luzhniki Stadium
- Dates: 25 July – 3 August 1980
- No. of events: 6
- Competitors: 68 from 11 nations

Equestrian at the 1980 Summer Olympics was represented by six events. All of them, with the exception of the Individual Jumping Grand Prix, were held in the Trade Unions' Equestrian Complex, which is situated in the Bitsa Forest Park (southern part of Moscow). Individual Jumping Grand Prix was held in the Grand Arena of the Central Lenin Stadium at Luzhniki (south-western part of Moscow).

Due to the US-led boycott, only eleven nations competed in the equestrian events: Austria, Bulgaria, Guatemala, Finland, Hungary, India, Italy, Mexico, Poland, Romania, and the USSR. Therefore, none of the top riders in the world competed, including the Italian eventing team and the current European champion in dressage, Austrian Sissy Theurer. India also sent an eventing team, but all four of its riders were eliminated. Team dressage event featured only four countries, guaranteeing three of them a medal (the Russians won gold). Overall, there were 68 entries from 11 nations in the equestrian competition at the 1980 Olympics.

== Disciplines ==
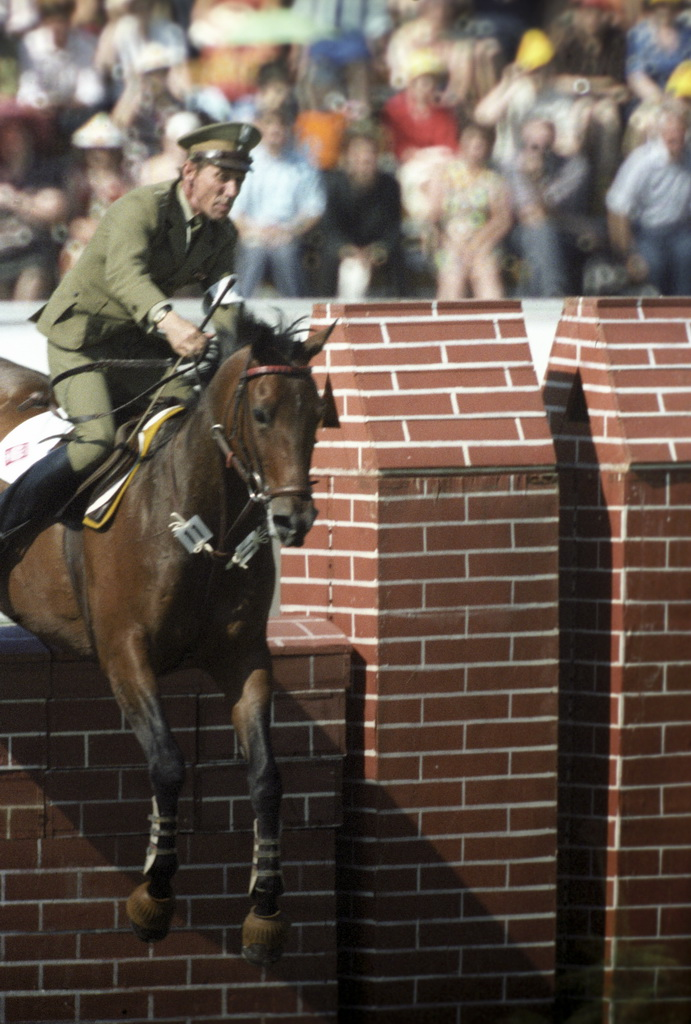
Individual show jumping gold medalist Jan Kowalczyk from Poland

=== Show jumping ===
26 riders from seven nations competed over Viatcheslav Kartavski's course, including six teams, none of whom were dominating powers in international show jumping. The course was kept easy, with ideal distances between fences. Only sixteen riders competed in the individual show jumping competition, including one each from Finland and Guatemala. The Guatemalan, Oswaldo Mendaz, finished in fourth place after losing the jump-off for bronze to Mexico's Joaquin Perez de la Heras. This remained the highest placing of a Guatemalan athlete at the Olympics until Erick Barrondo won an athletics silver medal in 2012. Silver went to Nikolaj Korolkov, finishing with 9.5 penalties, and gold went to Poland's Jan Kowalczyk, who had a rail in each round.

=== Dressage ===
Of the 14 riders (seven nations) competing in dressage, there was only one top international competitor: 26-year-old Elisabeth Theurer on her Hanoverian Mon Cheri. She finished the Grand Prix an astonishing 35 points ahead of the second place finisher Yuri Kovshov, and 82 points ahead of the third place winner Viktor Ugriumov. She spread this margin even further in the Grand Prix Special, to 90 points ahead of silver and 136 points ahead of bronze. However, her win was not marred by controversy, and the Austrian National Equestrian Federation's President resigned after her decision to compete.

Following the boycott from Western nations, the Soviet Union had to stimulate Soviet Bloc countries of Bulgaria, Poland and Romania to take part in a team competition on a short notice. As a consequence, most of the participants were very inexperienced and have scored some of the lowest marks in the Olympic history. Without any significant competition, the Soviet dressage team won by a record 803 points ahead of the silver medal winning Bulgarian team. This was managed even without one of their top riders, Elena Petushkova, after her horse died from an illness.

=== Eventing ===
Only six nations competed, but with the addition of the 1964 Olympics gold medal winners (Italy) to the team fielded by the USSR (three-time European Champion), there was some competition. Endurance day was held in Bitsa forest park, over very deep footing, and included a 5500 meter Phase A, 3795 meter Steeplechase, 12100 meter Phase C, and a final 7685 meter cross-country course. Although the course was inviting, 11 of the 28 starters were eliminated.

== Medal summary ==
Games	Gold	Silver	Bronze
Individual dressage	Elisabeth Theurer on Mon Cherie (AUT)	Yuri Kovshov on Igrok (URS)	Viktor Ugryumov on Shkval (URS)
Team dressage	Soviet Union; Yuri Kovshov and Igrok; Viktor Ugryumov and Shkfval; Vera Misevich and Plot	Bulgaria; Petar Mandajiev and Stchibor; Svetoslav lvanov and Aleko; Gheorghi Gadjev and Vnimatelen	Romania; Anghelache Donescu and Dor; Dumitru Veliku and Decebal; Petre Rosca and Derbist
Individual eventing	Federico Roman on Rossinan (ITA)	Aleksandr Blinov on Galzun (URS)	Yuri Salnikov on Pintset (URS)
Team eventing	Soviet Union; Aleksandr Blinov and Galzun; Yuri Salnikov and Pintset; Valery Volkov and Tskheti; Sergei Rogozhin and Gelespont	Italy; Federico Roman and Rossinan; Anna Casagrande and Daleye; Mauro Roman and Dourakine 4 Marina Sciocchetti and Rohan de Lechereo	Mexico; Manuel Mendívil and Remember; David Bárcena and Bombon; José Luis Pérez Soto and Quelite; Fabián Vázquez and Cocaleco
Individual jumping	Jan Kowalczyk on Artemor (POL)	Nikolai Korolkov on Espadron (URS)	Joaquin Perez Heras on Alymony (MEX)
Team jumping	Soviet Union; Vyacheslav Chukanov and Gepatit; Viktor Poganovsky and Topky; Viktor Asmaev and Reis; Nikolai Korolkov and Espadron	Poland; Marian Kozicki and Bremen; Jan Kowalczyk and Artemor; Wiesław Hartman and Norton; Janusz Bobik and Szampan	Mexico; Joaquín Pérez and Alymony; Jesús Gómez and Massacre; Gerardo Tazzer and Caribe; Alberto Valdes Jr. and Lady Mirka

== Medals ==
The Soviet Union dominated team competitions, winning gold medals in all of them. However, they did not win any individual gold as Italy, Poland and Austria won the individual jumping, eventing and dressage competitions, respectively.

Rank	Nation	Gold	Silver	Bronze	Total
1	Soviet Union	3	3	2	8
2	Italy	1	1	0	2
2	Poland	1	1	0	2
4	Austria	1	0	0	1
5	Bulgaria	0	1	0	1
6	Mexico	0	0	3	3
7	Romania	0	0	1	1
Totals (7 entries)		6	6	6	18

== Events ==
=== Individual dressage ===
Final; Rank	Name	Horse	Country	Time	Score
1	Elisabeth Theurer	Mon Cherie	Austria	7:44	1370
2	Yuri Kovshov	Igrok	Soviet Union	7:35	1300
3	Viktor Ugryumov	Shkval	Soviet Union	8:03	1234
4	Vera Misevich	Plot	Soviet Union	7:53	1231
5	Kyra Kyrklund	Piccolo	Finland	8:02	1121
6	Anghelache Donescu	Dor	Romania	7:20	960
7	Georgi Gadzhev	Vnimatelen	Bulgaria		881
8	Svetoslav Ivanov	Aleko	Bulgaria		850
9	Petar Mandajiev	Schibor	Bulgaria		846
10	Józef Zagor	Helios	Poland		804
11	Petre Roşca	Derbist	Romania		741
12	Dumitru Velicu	Decebal	Romania		720
13	Elżbieta Morciniec	Sum	Poland
14	Wanda Wąsowska	Damask	Poland

=== Team dressage ===
Final; Rank	Name	Horse	Country	Score
1	Yuri Kovshov; Viktor Ugryumov; Vera Misevich	lgrok Shkval; Plot	Soviet Union	4383
2	Petar Mandajiev; Svetoslav lvanov Gheorghi Gadjev	Stchibor; Aleko; Vnimatelen	Bulgaria	3580
3	Anghelache Donescu; Dumitru Veliku; Petre Rosca	Dor; Decebal; Derbist	Romania	3346
4	Jozef Zagor; Elżbieta Morciniec; Wanda Wąsowska	Helios; Sum; Damask	Poland	2945

=== Three-day event ===
Final; Rank	Name	Horse	Country	Score
1	Federico Roman	Rossinan	Italy	-108.60
2	Aleksandr Blinov	Galzun	Soviet Union	-120.80
3	Yuri Salnikov	Pintset	Soviet Union	-151.60
4	Valery Volkov	Tskheti	Soviet Union	-184.60
5	Tzvetan Dontchev	Medisson	Bulgaria	-185.80
6	Mirosław Szłapka	Erywań	Poland	-241.80
7	Anna Casagrande	Daleye	Italy	-266.20
8	Mauro Roman	Dourakine 4	Italy	-281.40
9	Marina Sciocchetti	Rohan de Lechereo	Italy	-308.40
10	Manuel Mendívil	Remember	Mexico	-319.75
11	Sergey Rogozhin	Gelespont	Soviet Union	-338.80
12	David Bárcena	Bombona	Mexico	-362.50
13	Jacek Wierzchowiecki	Bastion	Poland	-411.80
14	László Cseresnyés	Fapipa	Hungary	-436.20
15	José Luis Pérez	Quelite	Mexico	-490.60
16	István Grózner	Biboros	Hungary	-498.60
17	Zoltán Horváth	Lamour	Hungary	-668.60
-	Dimo Khristov	Bogez	Bulgaria	DNF
-	Stanisław Jasiński	Hangar	Poland	DNF
-	Dzhenko Sabev	Normativ	Bulgaria	DNF
-	Fabián Vázquez	Cocaleco	Mexico	DNF
-	Mihály Oláh	Ados	Hungary	DNF
-	Trifon Datsinski	Mentor-2	Bulgaria	DNF
-	Jacek Daniluk	Len	Poland	DNF
-	Muhammad Khan	I-Am-It	India	DNF
-	Darya Singh	Bobby	India	DNF
-	Jitendarjit Singh Ahluwalia	Shiwalik	India	DNF
-	Hussain Singh	Rajdoot	India	DNF

=== Team three-day event ===
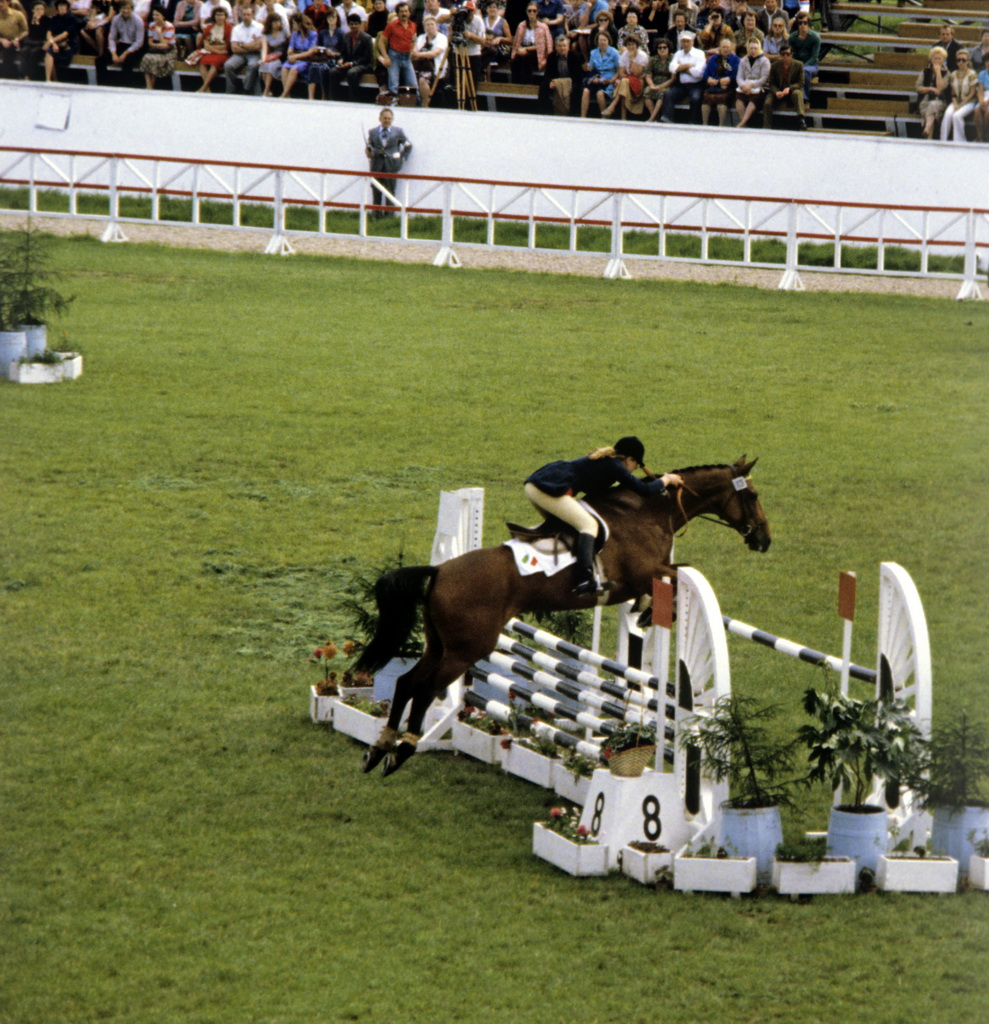
Team silver medalist Anna Casagrande of Italy in the eventing competition

Final; Rank	Name	Horse	Country	Score
1	Aleksandr Blinov; Yuri Salnikov; Valery Volkov; Sergei Rogozhin	Galzun; Pintset; Tskheti; Gelespont	Soviet Union	457.00
2	Federico Roman; Anna Casagrande; Mauro Roman; Marina Sciocchetti	Rossinan; Daleye; Dourakin 4 Rohan de Lechereo	Italy	656.20
3	Manuel Mendivil; David Bárcena; José Luis Pérez; Fabián Vázquez	Remember; Bombona; Quelite; Cocaleco	Mexico	1172.85
4	László Cseresnyés lstván Grózner; Zoltán Horváth; Mihály Oláh	Fapipa; Biboros; Lamour; Ados	Hungary	1603.40
-	Mirosław Szłapka; Jacek Wierzchowiecki; Stanisław Jasiński; Jacek Daniluk	Erywan; Bastion; Hangar; Len	Poland	DNF
-	Tsvetan Dontchev; Dimo Khristov; Dzhenko Sabev; Trifon Datsinski	Medisson; Bogez; Normativ; Mentor-2	Bulgaria	DNF
-	Muhammad Khan; Darya Singh; Jitendarjit Singh Ahluwalia; Hussain Khan	I-Am-It; Bobby; Shewalik; Rajdoot	India	DNF

=== Individual jumping grand prix ===
Final; Rank	Name	Horse	Country	Score
1	Jan Kowalczyk	Artemor	Poland	8.00
2	Nikolai Korolkov	Espadron	Soviet Union	9.50
3	Joaquín Pérez	Alymony	Mexico	12.00
4	Oswaldo Méndez	Pampa	Guatemala	12.00
5	Viktor Poganovsky	Topky	Soviet Union	15.50
6	Wiesław Hartman	Norton	Poland	16.00
7	Barnabás Hevesy	Bohem	Hungary	24.00
8	Marian Kozicki	Bremen	Poland	24.50
9	Vyacheslav Chukanov	Gepatit	Soviet Union	24.75
10	Boris Pavlov	Montblanc	Bulgaria	26.50
11	Alberto Valdés, Jr.	Lady Mirka	Mexico	28.00
12	Christopher Wegelius	Monday Morning	Finland	30.25
13	Nikola Dimitrov	Vals	Bulgaria	36.25
14	Ferenc Krucsó	Vadrozsa	Hungary	40.25
-	Dimitar Genov	Makbet	Bulgaria	DNF
-	Jesús Gómez	Massacre	Mexico	DSQ

Remark:for 3rd and 4th ranked contestants the standings are after jump-off.

=== Team jumping grand prix ===
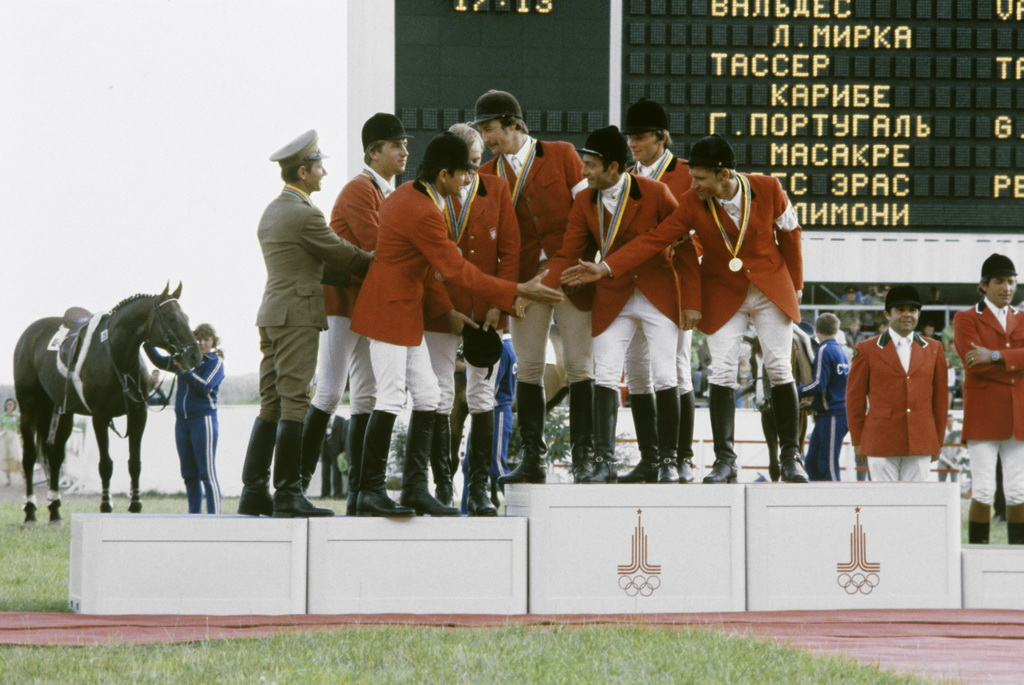
Polish jumpers cogratulate the Soviets after their gold medal performance.

Final; Rank	Name	Horse	Country	Score
1	Vyacheslav Chukanov; Viktor Poganovsky; Viktor Asmaev; Nikolai Korolkov	Gepatit; Topky; Reis; Espadron	Soviet Union	20.25
2	Marian Kozicki; Jan Kowalczyk; Wiesław Hartman; Janusz Bobik	Bremen; Artemor; Norton; Szampan	Poland	56.00
3	Joaquin Pérez; Jesús Gómez; Gerardo Tazzer; Alberto Valdés, Jr.	Alymony; Massacre; Caribe; Lady Mirka	Mexico	59.75
4	Barnabás Hevesi; Ferenc Krucsó; András Balogi; József Varró	Bohem; Vadrózsa; Artemis; Gambrinusz	Hungary	124.00
5	Alexandru Bozan; Dania Popescu; Ion Popa; Dumitru Velea	Prejmer; Sonor; Licurici; Fudul	Romania	150.50
6	Dimitar Ghenov; Khristo Katchov; Nikola Dimitrov; Boris Pavlov	Makbet; Povod; Vals; Monblan	Bulgaria	159.50

== Officials ==
Appointment of officials was as follows:

Dressage

- (Netherlands) Jaap Pot (Ground Jury President)
- (Denmark) Jytte Lemkow (Ground Jury Member)
- (East Germany) Erich Heinrich (Ground Jury Member)
- (Colombia) Tilo Koeppel (Ground Jury Member)
- (Sweden) Gustaf Nyblæus (Ground Jury Member)

Jumping

- (Poland) Eryk Brabec (Ground Jury President)
- (Belgium) Antoine Dumont de Chassart (Ground Jury Member)
- (Soviet Union) Viacheslav Kartavski (Course Designer)
- (Italy) Giovanni Marcone (Technical Delegate)

Eventing

- (Italy) Fabio Mangilli (Ground Jury President)
- (Soviet Union) Valentin Mishin (Ground Jury Member)
- (Czechoslovakia) Zdenek Tepli-Widner (Ground Jury Member)
- (Soviet Union) Viacheslav Kartavski (Course Designer)
- (Switzerland) Anton Bühler (Technical Delegate)
