= Equestrian at the 1980 Summer Olympics – Team eventing =

Team eventing at the Games of the XXII Olympiad
- Venue: Trade Unions' Equestrian Complex
- Date: 25–27 July
- Competitors: 28 from 7 nations

Medalists
1st place, gold medalist(s)		Aleksandr Blinov; Sergei Rogozhin; Yuri Salnikov; Valery Volkov	Soviet Union
2nd place, silver medalist(s)		Anna Casagrande; Federico Roman; Mauro Roman; Marina Sciocchetti	Italy
3rd place, bronze medalist(s)		David Bárcena; Manuel Mendívil; José Luis Pérez Soto; Fabián Vázquez	Mexico

The team eventing at the 1980 Summer Olympics took place between 25 and 27 July. The event was open to men and women. The competition included three segments: dressage, cross-country, and show-jumping. Penalties from each were summed to give a total score. Scores from the top 3 horse and rider pairs for each nation were summed to give a team score; the lowest pair's score was dropped. Teams without at least 3 finishing pairs were not given a final score.

The competition was split into three phases:

1. Dressage (25 July)
  Riders performed the dressage test.
2. Endurance (26 July)
  Riders tackled roads and tracks, steeplechase and cross-country portions.
3. Jumping (27 July)
  Riders jumped at the show jumping course.

== Results ==
Rank	Nation	Individual results						Team score
Rank	Nation	Rider	Horse	Dressage	Endurance	Jumping	Total	Team score
1st place, gold medalist(s)	Soviet Union	Aleksandr Blinov	Galzun	64.40	56.40	0.00	120.80	457.00
1st place, gold medalist(s)	Soviet Union	Yury Salnikov	Pintest	53.00	93.60	5.00	151.60	457.00
1st place, gold medalist(s)	Soviet Union	Valery Volkov	Tskheti	54.40	125.60	5.00	184.60	457.00
1st place, gold medalist(s)	Soviet Union	Sergey Rogozhin	Gelespont	57.00	266.80	15.00	~~338.80~~	457.00
2nd place, silver medalist(s)	Italy	Federico Roman	Rossinan	54.40	49.20	5.00	108.60	656.20
2nd place, silver medalist(s)	Italy	Anna Casagrande	Daleye	61.20	190.00	15.00	266.20	656.20
2nd place, silver medalist(s)	Italy	Mauro Roman	Dourakine	63.40	218.00	0.00	281.40	656.20
2nd place, silver medalist(s)	Italy	Marina Sciocchetti	Rohan de Lechereo	55.20	243.20	10.00	~~308.40~~	656.20
3rd place, bronze medalist(s)	Mexico	Manuel Mendívil	Remember	53.00	264.00	2.75	319.75	1172.85
3rd place, bronze medalist(s)	Mexico	David Bárcena	Bombona	54.40	265.60	42.50	362.50	1172.85
3rd place, bronze medalist(s)	Mexico	José Luis Pérez Soto	Quelite	64.00	415.60	11.00	490.60	1172.85
3rd place, bronze medalist(s)	Mexico	Fabián Vázquez	Cocaleco	62.00	DSQ	EL	EL	1172.85
4	Hungary	László Cseresnyés	Fapipa	85.00	331.20	20.00	436.20	1603.40
4	Hungary	István Grózner	Biboros	66.60	422.00	10.00	498.60	1603.40
4	Hungary	Zoltán Horváth	Lamour	65.20	578.40	25.00	668.60	1603.40
4	Hungary	Mihály Oláh	Ados	64.00	DSQ	EL	EL	1603.40
–	Poland	Mirosław Szłapka	Erywan	52.40	184.40	5.00	241.80	EL
–	Poland	Jacek Wierzchowiecki	Bastion	43.00	368.80	0.00	411.80	EL
–	Poland	Stanisław Jasiński	Hangar	55.80	DSQ	EL	EL	EL
–	Poland	Jacek Daniluk	Len	49.20	DNF	EL	EL	EL
–	Bulgaria	Tsvetan Donchev	Medisson	66.40	114.40	5.00	185.80	EL
–	Bulgaria	Dimo Khristov	Bogez	68.80	265.60	DSQ	EL	EL
–	Bulgaria	Dzhenko Sabev	Normativ	59.40	DSQ	EL	EL	EL
–	Bulgaria	Trifon Datsinski	Mentor-2	65.80	DSQ	EL	EL	EL
–	India	Muhammad Khan	I-Am-It	74.00	DSQ	EL	EL	EL
–	India	Darya Singh	Bobby	94.80	DSQ	EL	EL	EL
–	India	Jitendarjit Singh Ahluwalia	Shiwalik	84.00	DSQ	EL	EL	EL
–	India	Hussain Khan	Rajdoot	81.80	DNF	EL	EL	EL
