= Equestrian at the 1980 Summer Olympics – Individual eventing =

Equestrian at the Olympics

Individual eventing at the Games of the XXII Olympiad
- Venue: Trade Unions' Equestrian Complex
- Date: 25–27 July
- Competitors: 28 from 7 nations

Medalists
1st place, gold medalist(s)		Federico Roman	Italy
2nd place, silver medalist(s)		Aleksandr Blinov	Soviet Union
3rd place, bronze medalist(s)		Yuri Salnikov	Soviet Union

The individual eventing at the 1980 Summer Olympics took place between 25 and 27 July at the Trade Unions' Equestrian Complex.

The competition was split into three phases:

1. Dressage (25 July)
  Riders performed the dressage test.
2. Endurance (26 July)
  Riders tackled roads and tracks, steeplechase and cross-country portions.
3. Jumping (27 July)
  Riders jumped at the show jumping course.

== Results ==
Rank	Rider	Horse	Nationality	Dressage	Rank	Endurance	Rank	After Endurance	Rank	Jumping	Rank	Total
1st place, gold medalist(s)	Federico Roman	Rossinan	Italy	54.40	7	49.20	1	103.60	1	5.00	5	108.60
2nd place, silver medalist(s)	Aleksandr Blinov	Galzun	Soviet Union	64.40	18	56.40	2	120.80	1	0.00	1	120.80
3rd place, bronze medalist(s)	Yury Salnikov	Pintest	Soviet Union	53.00	4	93.60	3	146.60	3	5.00	5	151.60
4	Valery Volkov	Tskheti	Soviet Union	54.00	6	125.60	5	179.60	4	5.00	5	184.60
5	Tsvetan Donchev	Medisson	Bulgaria	66.40	21	114.40	4	180.80	5	5.00	5	185.80
6	Mirosław Szłapka	Erywan	Poland	52.40	3	184.40	6	236.80	6	5.00	5	241.80
7	Anna Casagrande	Daleye	Italy	61.20	13	190.00	7	251.20	7	15.00	13	266.20
8	Mauro Roman	Dourakine	Italy	63.40	15	218.00	8	281.40	8	0.00	1	281.40
9	Marina Sciocchetti	Rohan de Lechereo	Italy	55.20	9	243.20	9	298.40	9	10.00	10	308.40
10	Manuel Mendívil	Remember	Mexico	53.00	4	264.00	10	317.00	10	2.75	4	319.75
11	Sergey Rogozhin	Gelespont	Soviet Union	57.00	11	266.80	13	323.80	12	15.00	13	338.80
12	David Bárcena	Bombona	Mexico	54.40	7	265.60	11	320.00	13	42.50	17	362.50
13	Jacek Wierzchowiecki	Bastion	Poland	43.00	1	368.80	15	411.80	14	0.00	1	411.80
14	László Cseresnyés	Fapipa	Hungary	85.00	27	331.20	14	416.20	15	20.00	15	436.20
15	José Luis Pérez Soto	Quelite	Mexico	64.00	16	415.60	16	479.60	16	11.00	12	490.60
16	István Grózner	Biboros	Hungary	66.60	22	422.00	17	488.60	17	10.00	10	498.60
17	Zoltán Horváth	Lamour	Hungary	65.20	19	578.40	18	643.60	18	25.00	16	668.60
DNF	Dimo Khristov	Bogez	Bulgaria	68.80	23	265.60	11	334.40	13	Disqualified		
DNF	Stanisław Jasiński	Hangar	Poland	55.80	10	Disqualified		did not advance				
DNF	Dzhenko Sabev	Normativ	Bulgaria	59.40	12	Disqualified		did not advance				
DNF	Fabián Vázquez	Cocaleco	Mexico	62.00	14	Disqualified		did not advance				
DNF	Mihály Oláh	Ados	Hungary	64.00	16	Disqualified		did not advance				
DNF	Trifon Datsinski	Mentor-2	Bulgaria	65.80	20	Disqualified		did not advance				
DNF	Muhammad Khan	I-Am-It	India	74.00	24	Disqualified		did not advance				
DNF	Darya Singh	Bobby	India	94.80	28	Disqualified		did not advance				
DNF	Jitendarjit Singh Ahluwalia	Shiwalik	India	84.00	26	Disqualified		did not advance				
DNF	Jacek Daniluk	Len	Poland	49.20	2	did not finish		did not advance				
DNF	Hussain Khan	Rajdoot	India	81.80	25	did not finish		did not advance				
