= Equestrian at the 1980 Summer Olympics – Individual dressage =

Equestrian at the Olympics

Individual dressage at the Games of the XXII Olympiad
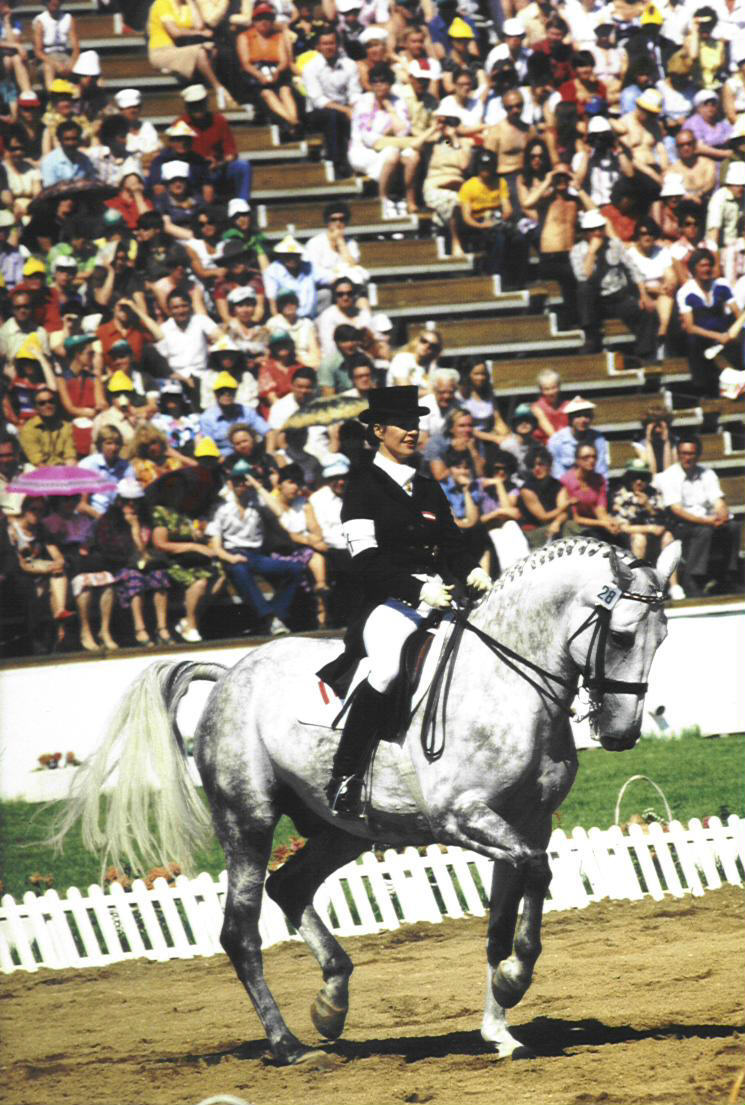
- Elisabeth Theurer and Mon Cherie
- Venue: Trade Unions' Equestrian Complex
- Date: 31 July – 1 August
- Competitors: 14 from 6 nations

Medalists
| 1st place, gold medalist(s) | | Elisabeth Theurer | Austria |
| 2nd place, silver medalist(s) | | Yuri Kovshov | Soviet Union |
| 3rd place, bronze medalist(s) | | Viktor Ugryumov | Soviet Union |

The individual dressage at the 1980 Summer Olympics took place on 31 July and 1 August at the Trade Unions' Equestrian Complex.

The competition was split into two phases:

1. Grand Prix (31 July)
  Riders performed the Grand Prix test. The twelve riders with the highest scores advanced to the final.
2. Grand Prix Special (1 August)
  Riders performed the Grand Prix Special test.

== Competition ==
Of the 14 starters in the individual competition, only two of them came from Western nations – Elisabeth Theurer of Austria and Kyra Kyrklund of Finland.

Team competition served as the individual qualifier. In the Grand Prix Special, in which only two riders of the Grand Prix class were not allowed to take part, the difference of quality became even more pronounced. Theurer, Kyrklund and the three Soviet riders were the only ones who managed to score more than 1000 points. Theurer's gold medal however was never in danger and with a classy performance she received 1370 points, almost double as much as the last placed rider from Romania in this individual competition.

Theurer received criticism for deciding to go to Moscow instead of Goodwood, which hosted the Olympic Festival for west-block nations. Without much support from the Austrian Federation, her horse Mon Cherie was flown to Moscow by Niki Lauda.

== Results ==
| Rank | Rider | Horse | Grand Prix | | Grand Prix Special |
| Rank | Rider | Horse | Points | Rank | Points |
|---|---|---|---|---|---|
| 1st place, gold medalist(s) | Elisabeth Theurer (AUT) | Mon Cherie | 1623 | 1 | 1370 |
| 2nd place, silver medalist(s) | Yuri Kovshov (URS) | Igrok | 1588 | 2 | 1300 |
| 3rd place, bronze medalist(s) | Viktor Ugryumov (URS) | Shkval | 1541 | 3 | 1234 |
| 4 | Vera Misevich (URS) | Plot | 1254 | 6 | 1231 |
| 5 | Kyra Kyrklund (FIN) | Piccolo | 1458 | 4 | 1121 |
| 6 | Anghel Donescu (ROU) | Dor | 1255 | 5 | 960 |
| 7 | Georgi Gadzhev (BUL) | Vnimatelen | 1146 | 9 | 881 |
| 8 | Svetoslav Ivanov (BUL) | Aleko | 1190 | 8 | 850 |
| 9 | Petar Mandajiev (BUL) | Schibor | 1244 | 7 | 846 |
| 10 | Józef Zagor (POL) | Helios | 1061 | 11 | 804 |
| 11 | Petre Roşca (ROU) | Derbist | 1015 | 12 | 741 |
| 12 | Dumitru Velicu (ROU) | Decebal | 1076 | 10 | 720 |
| 13 | Elżbieta Morciniec (POL) | Sum | 954 | 13 | Did not advance |
| 14 | Wanda Wąsowska (POL) | Damask | 930 | 14 | Did not advance |
