= Equestrian at the 1980 Summer Olympics – Individual jumping =

Equestrian at the Olympics

Individual jumping at the Games of the XXII Olympiad
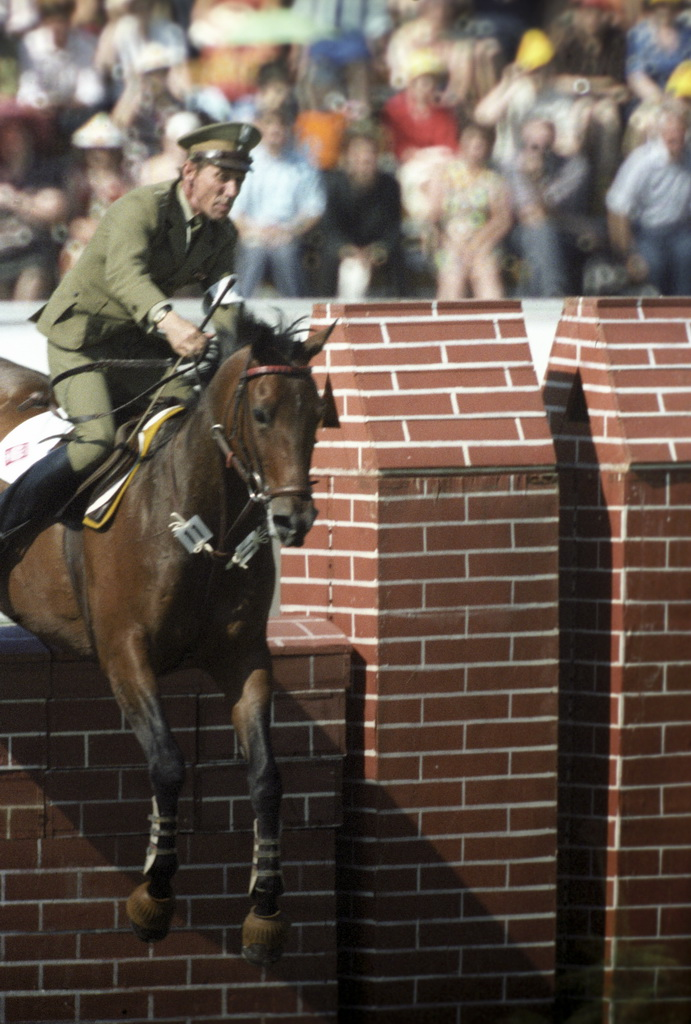
- Jan Kowalczyk competing
- Venue: Luzhniki Stadium
- Date: 3 August
- Competitors: 16 from 7 nations
- Winning total: 8.00 faults

Medalists
1st place, gold medalist(s)		Jan Kowalczyk; Poland
2nd place, silver medalist(s)		Nikolai Korolkov; Soviet Union
3rd place, bronze medalist(s)		Joaquín Pérez; Mexico

The individual show jumping at the 1980 Summer Olympics took place on 3 August at the Grand Arena of the Central Lenin Stadium. The event was open to men and women. This event was heavily impacted by the American-led boycott. There were 16 competitors from 7 nations. Previous Games had approximately 50 riders at each. The event was won by Jan Kowalczyk of Poland, the nation's first victory in individual jumping and first medal in the event since 1924. Nikolai Korolkov earned the Soviet Union's first medal in the event with his silver. Mexico reached the podium for the first time since 1948 with Joaquín Pérez's bronze.

== Background ==
This was the 16th appearance of the event, which had first been held at the 1900 Summer Olympics and has been held at every Summer Olympics at which equestrian sports have been featured (that is, excluding 1896, 1904, and 1908). It is the oldest event on the current programme, the only one that was held in 1900. The team and individual events remained separated, as they had been starting in 1968.

The small field was devoid of top riders due to the massive boycott of Western nations.But,from that competed at the Games, such as Belgium, France, Italy, and Great Britain, participation in this event was low, with many opting to compete at the Rotterdam Show Jumping Festival instead. None of the top 10 riders from the 1976 competition returned. No former Olympic medalists were present. No World Championships medalists competed.

Bulgaria made its debut in the event. Mexico competed for the 8th time, most of any nation competing but well behind the 14 appearances of France (missing the event for only the second time); eleven nations with more appearances than Mexico did not compete in 1980.

== Competition format ==
The competition used the two-round format introduced in 1952. The elimination feature added in 1968 was not used due to the small field; in previous years, the top 20 riders advanced from the first round to the second but with only 16 starters in 1980 there was no elimination. Both rounds were combined to determine placement. If tied a jump-off between all tied riders would determine the winners.

== Schedule ==
All times are Moscow Time (UTC+3)

Date	Time	Round
Sunday, 3 August 1980	8:00	Round 1 Round 2

== Results ==
Rank	Name	Nation	Round 1	Round 2	Total	Barrage
1st place, gold medalist(s)	Jan Kowalczyk	Poland	4.00	4.00	8.00	—N/a
2nd place, silver medalist(s)	Nikolai Korolkov	Soviet Union	4.00	5.50	9.50	—N/a
3rd place, bronze medalist(s)	Joaquín Pérez	Mexico	8.00	4.00	12.00	4.00 (43.23 s)
4	Oswaldo Méndez	Guatemala	8.00	4.00	12.00	4.00 (43.59 s)
5	Viktor Pohanovskiy	Soviet Union	4.00	11.50	15.50	—N/a
6	Wiesław Hartman	Poland	4.00	12.00	16.00	—N/a
7	Barnabás Hevesy	Hungary	16.00	8.00	24.00	—N/a
8	Marian Kozicki	Poland	12.00	12.50	24.50	—N/a
9	Vyacheslav Chukanov	Soviet Union	12.00	12.75	24.75	—N/a
10	Boris Pavlov	Bulgaria	16.00	10.50	26.50	—N/a
11	Alberto Váldes Jr.	Mexico	12.00	16.00	28.00	—N/a
12	Christopher Wegelius	Finland	16.00	14.25	30.25	—N/a
13	Nikola Dimitrov	Bulgaria	24.00	12.25	36.25	—N/a
14	Ferenc Krucsó	Hungary	16.00	24.25	40.25	—N/a
—	Dimitar Genov	Bulgaria	DNF	Did not advance		—N/a
—	Jesús Gómez	Mexico	DSQ	Did not advance		—N/a
