= Equestrian at the 1980 Summer Olympics – Team jumping =

Team jumping at the Games of the XXII Olympiad
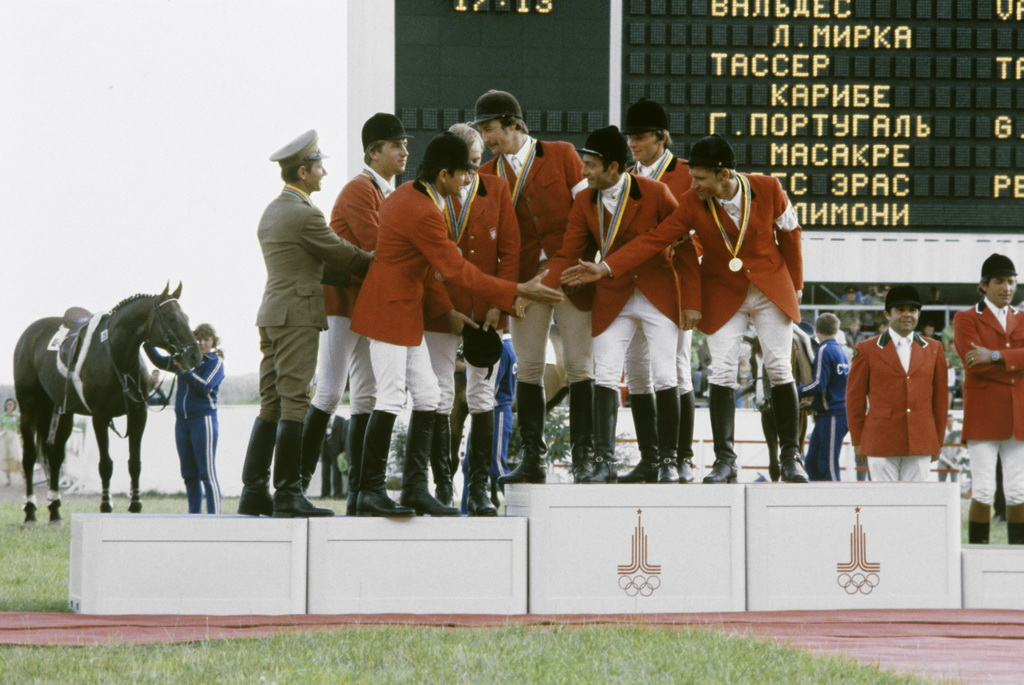
- Polish jumpers cogratulate the Soviets on their gold medal performance
- Venue: Trade Unions' Equestrian Complex
- Date: 29 July
- Competitors: 24 from 6 nations

Medalists
1st place, gold medalist(s)		Vyacheslav Chukanov; Viktor Poganovsky; Viktor Asmaev; Nikolai Korolkov	Soviet Union
2nd place, silver medalist(s)		Marian Kozicki; Jan Kowalczyk; Wiesław Hartman; Janusz Bobik	Poland
3rd place, bronze medalist(s)		Joaquín Pérez; Jesús Gómez; Gerardo Tazzer; Alberto Valdés Jr.	Mexico

The team jumping at the 1980 Summer Olympics took place on 29 July at the Trade Unions' Equestrian Complex.

== Results ==
Rank	Name	Nation	Round 1	Round 2	Total
1st place, gold medalist(s)	Vyacheslav Chukanov; Viktor Poganovsky; Viktor Asmaev; Nikolai Korolkov	Soviet Union	16.00	4.25	20.25
2nd place, silver medalist(s)	Marian Kozicki; Jan Kowalczyk; Wiesław Hartman; Janusz Bobik	Poland	32.00	24.00	56.00
3rd place, bronze medalist(s)	Joaquín Pérez; Jesús Gómez; Gerardo Tazzer; Alberto Valdés Jr.	Mexico	39.25	20.50	59.75
4	Barnabás Hevesy; Ferenc Krucsó; József Varró; András Balogi	Hungary	68.00	56.00	124.00
5	Alexandru Bozan; Dumitru Velea; Dania Popescu; Ioan Popa	Romania	44.25	106.25	150.50
6	Nikola Dimitrov; Dimitar Genov; Boris Pavlov; Khristo Kachev	Bulgaria	76.50	83.00	159.50
