= Equestrian at the 1980 Summer Olympics – Team dressage =

Equestrian at the Olympics

Individual dressage at the Games of the XXII Olympiad
- Venue: Dressage Facility Nymphenburg
- Date: 31 July
- Competitors: 12 (4 teams) from 4 nations

Medalists
1st place, gold medalist(s)		Yuri Kovshov; Viktor Ugryumov; Vera Misevich	Soviet Union
2nd place, silver medalist(s)		Petar Mandajiev; Svetoslav lvanov Gheorghi Gadjev	Bulgaria
3rd place, bronze medalist(s)		Anghelache Donescu; Dumitru Veliku; Petre Rosca	Romania

The team dressage in equestrian at the 1980 Olympic Games in Moscow was held at Trade Unions' Equestrian Complex on 31 July. Only four countries competed, with three winning medals.

== Background ==
Since their historic victory over Germany at the 1972 Olympic Games in Munich, the Soviet dressage riders struggled to regain a leading position and missed a team podium entirely at the 1976 Olympic Games in Montreal. When a boycott of the stronger nations became obvious, the almost 100% chance of recapturing Olympic gold appeared on the horizon for the host nation.

However, to get a team medal, there needed to be more than just a Soviet team in Moscow. As the countries belonging to the political Western world, which dominated equestrian competitions, boycotted the Games, the Soviet Union had to stimulate other countries to take part. Those countries had some international dressage riders, but few really at the Olympic, Grand Prix-level. In the end, Eastern Bloc countries Bulgaria, Romania and Poland travelled to Moscow to guarantee a team competition. All this logistic maneuvering to guarantee a nations' ranking led to the fact that Poland, for instance, only found out they were allowed to compete with a team two days before departure.

In Moscow in the end there was a team class, there were three team medals awarded, but to speak of Olympic level is hard when looking at the results these brave riders and horses got from the highly experienced chief judge Gustaf Nyblaeus and his four colleagues. The judges' panel was challenged in its own way with more horses not able to show certain movements than they would have cared for.

The Soviet Union won their coveted team gold in the impressive Bitza stadium about 50 km outside Moscow with more than 800 points ahead of Bulgaria and Romania more than 230 points behind the silver medalists.

== Competition format ==
The team medals were awarded after the Grand-Prix portion of the individual competition. After the Grand-Prix portion of the individual event the three rides of each team were added up and the highest score was the winner, all three scores counted towards the final. Both the team and the individual competitions ran concurrently.

== Results ==
Rank	Names	Horses	Grand Prix	Total
1st place, gold medalist(s)	Soviet Union; Yuri Kovshov; Viktor Ugryumov; Vera Misevich	Igrok; Shkfval; Plot	1588; 1597; 1254	4383
2nd place, silver medalist(s)	Bulgaria; Petar Mandajiev; Svetoslav lvanov Gheorghi Gadjev	Stchibor; Aleko; Vnimatelen	1244; 1190; 1146	3580
3rd place, bronze medalist(s)	Romania; Anghelache Donescu; Dumitru Veliku; Petre Rosca	Dor; Decebal; Derbist	1255; 1076; 1015	3346
4	Poland; Jozef Zagor; Elżbieta Morciniec; Wanda Wąsowska	Helios; Sum; Damask	1061; 954; 930	2945
