= Equestrian sport in India =

- Country: India
- Governing body: Equestrian Federation of India
- National team: India
- First played: 1967

India has a wide following in various equestrian sports like showjumping, eventing, dressage, endurance and tent pegging. Supported by the Equestrian Federation of India, eventing is the most popular of the five, with teams representing the country at most Asian Games, winning a bronze medal in the 2002 and 2006 games. India has been represented in five Olympic Games by its equestrians in the years 1980 (Moscow), 1996 (Atlanta), 2000 (Sydney), 2020 (Tokyo) and 2024 (Paris). Anush Agarwalla became the first Indian to represent the country in Dressage in Modern Summer Olympics. The Equestrian Premier League aims to support the sport in the country.

== Medals won in International Equestrian events ==
Competition	Gold	Silver	Bronze	Total
Asian Games	4	3	7	14
Total	4	3	7	14

- updated till 2023

== Indian Olympic Equestrians ==
Equestrian	Olympics	Events	Horse	Notes
Jitendarjit Singh Ahluwalia	1980 Olympics	Three day event -Team and Individual	Shiwalik	
Hussain Khan	1980 Olympics	Three day event - Team and Individual	Rajdoot	
Muhammad Khan	1980 Olympics	Three day event - Team and Individual	I-Am-It	
Darya Singh	1980 Olympics	Three day event - Team and Individual	Bobby	
Indrajit Lamba	1996 Olympics	Individual eventing	Karishma	
Imtiaz Anees	2000 Olympics	Individual eventing	Spring Invader	Rank 23
Fouaad Mirza	2020 Olympics	Individual eventing	Seigneur Medicot	Rank 23
Anush Agarwalla	2024 Olympics	Individual dressage	Sir Caramello Old	Rank 52

== Indian Equestrians at Asian Games ==
The following are medalists in the Asian Games:

Equestrian	Olympics	Events	Horse	Notes
Bhagirath Singh	2006 Doha Asian Games	Team eventing		
Deep Kumar Ahlawat	2006 Doha Asian Games	Team eventing		
Palwinder Singh	2006 Doha Asian Games	Team eventing		
Rajesh Pattu	2006 Doha Asian Games	Team eventing		
Rakesh Kumar	2018 Jakarta Asian Games	Team eventing		
Ashish Malik	2018 Jakarta Asian Games	Team eventing		
Jitender Singh	2018 Jakarta Asian Games	Team eventing		
Fouaad Mirza	2018 Jakarta Asian Games	Team eventing		

=== List of National Sports award recipients in Equestrian, showing the year, award, and gender ===
Year	Recipient	Award	Gender
1973	Dafadar Md. Khan	Arjuna Award	Male
1976	H. S. Sodhi	Arjuna Award	Male
1982	Rupinder Singh Brar	Arjuna Award	Male
1982	Raghubir Singh	Arjuna Award	Male
1984	Ghulam Mohammed Khan	Arjuna Award	Male
1987	J. S. Ahluwalia	Arjuna Award	Male
1991	Adhiraj Singh	Arjuna Award	Male
2003	Rajesh Pattu	Arjuna Award	Male
2004	Deep Kumar Ahlawat	Arjuna Award	Male
2019	Fouaad Mirza	Arjuna Award	Male
2020	Sawant Ajay Anant	Arjuna Award	Male
