= Boris Pavlov =

Boris Pavlov may refer to:

- Boris Pavlov (equestrian) (born 1946), Bulgarian equestrian
- Boris Pavlov (weightlifter) (1947–2004), Soviet weightlifter
