= Ioan Popa =

Ioan Popa may refer to:

- Ioan Popa (fencer) (1953–2017), Romanian épée fencer
- Ioan Popa (equestrian) (born 1949), Romanian equestrian

== See also ==
- Ioan Pop, Romanian sabre fencer
