= Aleksandr Blinov =

Aleksandr Blinov may refer to:

- Aleksandr Blinov (equestrian) (1954–2021), Soviet equestrian and Olympic champion
- Aleksandr Blinov (sport shooter) (born 1981), Russian sport shooter
