= Ugryumov =

Ugryumov or Ugryumova (feminine) are Russian surnames. It is the last name of the following people:

- German Ugryumov, Soviet and Russian navy and security services official
- Grigory Ugryumov, Russian painter
- Pyotr Ugryumov, former professional road racing cyclist from Latvia
- Viktor Ugryumov, former Soviet equestrian and Olympic champion
