= Bittsevsky Park =

Bittsevsky Park may refer to:

- Bittsa Park, a natural park in southern Moscow
- Bittsevsky Park (Butovskaya Line), a Moscow Metro station on the Butovskaya Light Metro Line
- Novoyasenevskaya (Moscow Metro), a Moscow Metro station on the Kaluzhsko-Rizhskaya Line that was called Bittsevsky Park until 2009
