= Cseresnyés =

Cseresnyés is a surname. Notable people with the surname include:

- László Cseresnyés (born 1958), Hungarian equestrian
- Péter Cseresnyés (born 1960), Hungarian politician
