= Equestrian events at the Friendship Games =

Equestrian events at the Friendship Games included show jumping, dressage and eventing in both individual and team competitions. Events were held on three venues in Poland: Jumping events were held in Sopot between 6 and 10 August, dressage – at the Książ Landscape Park near Wałbrzych between 17 and 19 August, while eventing was held at the Modern Pentathlon and Equestrian Centre of the Lubusz Sports Club "Lumel" in Drzonków on 23–26 August 1984.

== Medal summary ==
Event	Gold		Silver		Bronze	
Individual dressage	Yuri Kovshov on Ruch (URS)	1,705	Yuri Kovshov on Bukiet (URS)	1,703	Olga Sirosh on Irtysz (URS)	1,649
Team dressage	Soviet Union (URS); Yuri Kovshov on Ruch; Olga Klimko on Barbaris; Olga Sirosh on Irtysz	4,187	Poland (POL); Elżbieta Morciniec on Frez; Bogusław Misztal on Damian; Andrzej Sałacki on Mytrop	3,867	East Germany (GDR); Ina Saalbach on Franziska; Magrit Böchme on Nox; Bernd Langren on Radames	3,840
Individual eventing	Jan Lipczyński on Elektron (POL)	42.05	Mirosław Szłapka on Leń (POL)	43.50	Valeriy Davidovich on Banitet (URS)	50.65
Team eventing	Poland (POL); Jan Lipczyński on Elektron; Mirosław Szłapka on Leń; Adam Prokulewicz on Lagar; Bogusław Jarecki on Niewiaża	137.20	Soviet Union (URS); Valeriy Davidovich on Banitet; Yuri Salnikov on Poplin; Vladimir Tishkin on Fleur; Boris Gorchakov on Zairo	199.30	none*	–
Individual jumping	Michelle Della Casa on Scarfel (ITA)	4	Stefan Scheve on Otto (FRG)	4	Eberhard Saul on Gobi (FRG)	4
Team jumping	West Germany (FRG); Tjark Nagel on Fregula; Stefan Scheve on Otto; Eberhard Saul on Gobi; Kurt Grevemeier on Sylvester	24	Italy (ITA); Federico Menghi on Benedict; Alesandro Galeazzi on Moreado; Stefano Scaccobarozzi on Jasil; Michelle Della Casa on Scarfel	47	Poland (POL); Janusz Bobik on Szampan; Rudolf Mrugała on Gaudeamus; Wiesław Hartman on Hart; Jan Kowalczyk on Festyn East Germany (GDR); Horst Lösche on Neptun II; Egbert Arndt on Hanniball; Falk Siegling on Grolle Disch; Rolf Günter on Duant	60

* – Five teams competed, but only two completed the event.

=== Individual jumping jump-off ===
A jump-off was needed to determine the winner in the individual jumping event.

	Rider	Horse	Penalties	Time (s)
1st place, gold medalist(s)	Michelle Della Casa (ITA)	Scarfel	0	24.02
2nd place, silver medalist(s)	Stefan Scheve (FRG)	Otto	0	24.23
3rd place, bronze medalist(s)	Eberhard Saul (FRG)	Gobi	4	24.41

== Medal table ==
* Host nation (Poland)

Rank	Nation	Gold	Silver	Bronze	Total
1	Soviet Union (URS)	2	2	2	6
2	Poland (POL)*	2	2	1	5
3	West Germany (FRG)	1	1	1	3
4	Italy (ITA)	1	1	0	2
5	East Germany (GDR)	0	0	2	2
Totals (5 entries)		6	6	6	18

== See also ==
- Equestrian at the 1984 Summer Olympics
