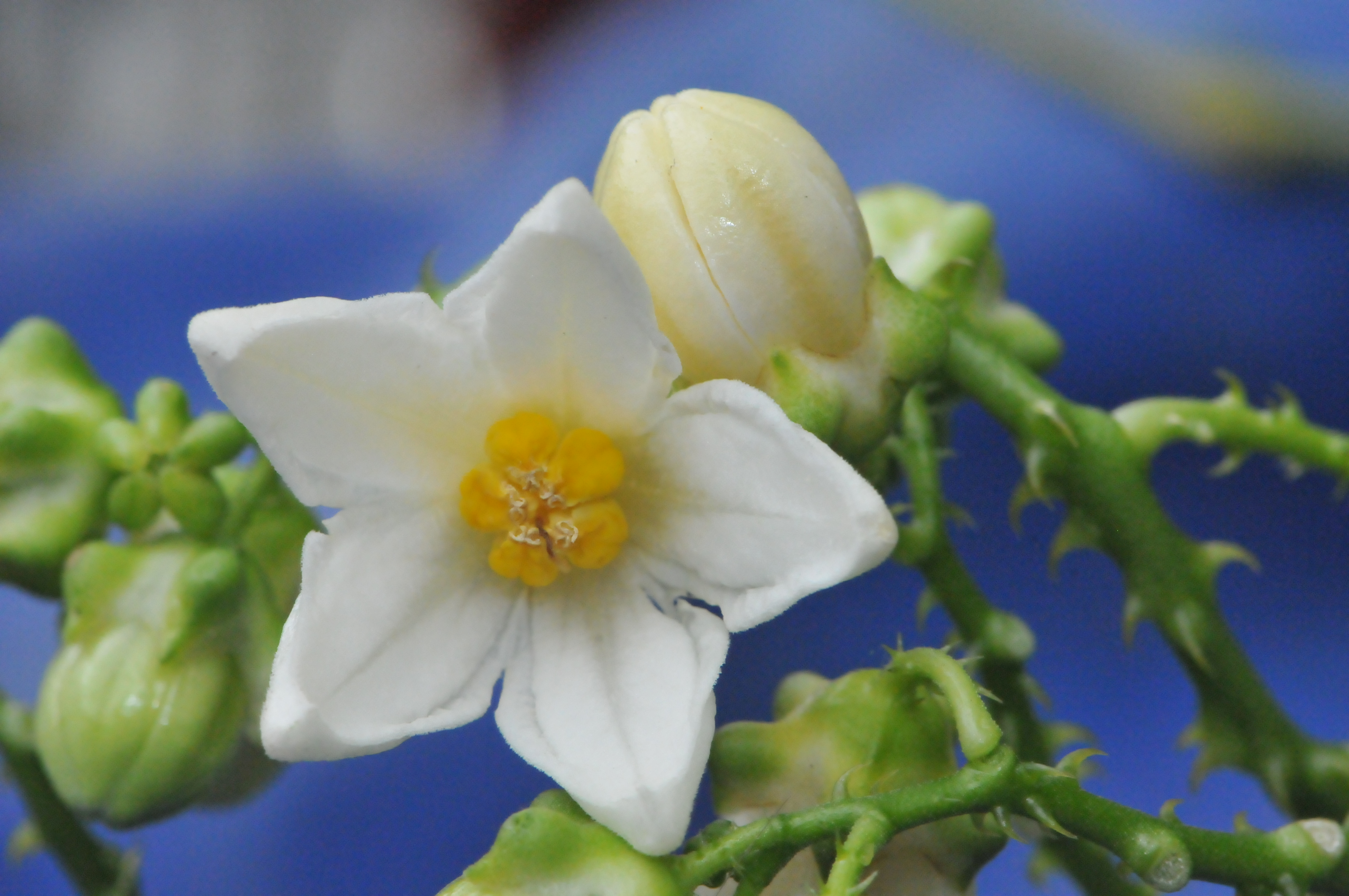

Scientific classification
- Kingdom: Plantae
- Clade: Tracheophytes
- Clade: Angiosperms
- Clade: Eudicots
- Clade: Asterids
- Order: Solanales
- Family: Solanaceae
- Genus: Solanum
- Species: S. pachyandrum

Binomial name
- Solanum pachyandrum Bitter

= Solanum pachyandrum =

Species of flowering plant

Solanum pachyandrum, known as bombona, is a spine-forming vine of the Solanum genus (which contains over 1,000 species). It is native to southwestern Ecuador and northwestern Peru where the large juicy fruit is commonly eaten and considered a treat by children. Although the plant has been known and consumed by the indigenous people of that land, it was only published scientifically in 1914 by German botanist Friedrich August Georg Bitter.

== Description ==
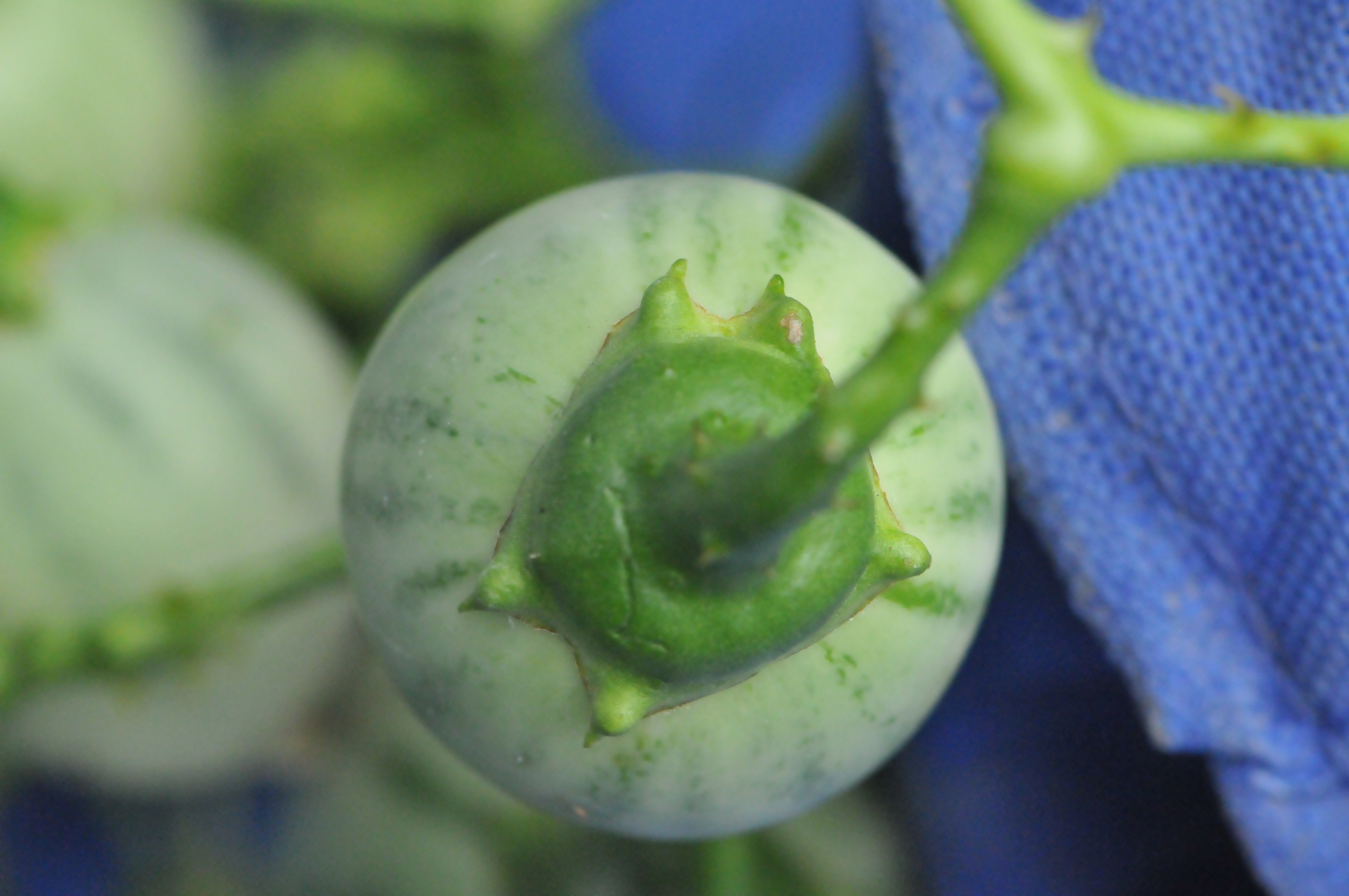
S. pachyandrum fruiting (unripe)

Bombona is a woody to subwoody vine growing 5+ m long that flowers from April to September in its native range in Ecuador and Peru. It differs from other related species by the presence of prickles on its pedicels (the stalks of individual flowers) and its ellipsoid, non-tapering anthers.

It's often said to be spiny, but is actually prickly since the spinose structures are not derived from leaves and lack vascular bundles inside, allowing them to more easily be removed. The prickles are 0.5 to 1.2 mm (0.020 to 0.047 in) long, stout, and recurved (curved downwards).

Stems are 0.4 to 0.7 cm (0.16 to 0.28 in) in diameter and internodes are glabrous (without hairs) and 4 to 9 cm (1.6 to 3.5 in) long. Sympodial units plurifoliate (having many leaves or inflorescences) and do not geminate.

Leaves are pinnatifid (so deeply lobed as to appear pinnation) with four to six pairs of lobes. The leaf blades in outline are 12 to 19 cm (4.7 to 7.5 in) in length and 5 to 10 cm (2.0 to 3.9 in) in width. They are oblong and around twice as long as they are wide. Their texture is chartaceous (meaning they have a papery texture) and are glabrous on both surfaces. The midrib has recurved prickles and there are four to six major lateral veins on each side of the midrib that correspond to the lobes.

Fruits are globose berries that are 3 to 5 cm (1.2 to 2.0 in) in diameter with a glabrous pericarp. They are purple when immature and turn yellow-orange once mature.

Seeds are about 2 mm × 4 mm (0.079 in × 0.157 in). They are light brown in color, strongly flattened, and the surfaces are minutely pitted. The testal cells of the seeds are rectangular.

== Taxonomy ==
Phylogenetic studies suggest it is likely part of a sister group to the rest of the prickly species belonging to the subgenus Leptostemonum called S. sect. Aculeigerum. Unlike most prickly species of Solanum, these species lack stellate hairs and are characterized by plurifoliate sympodial units, branched inflorescences, presence of prickles coupled with absence of stellate trichomes, and a vine-like habit.

The Solanum section Aculeigerum contains these eight species, all ranging in distribution from Mexico and Central America to Ecuador and Peru:

- Solanum alternatopinnatum Steud — juciri, jiquiri, or yuá-pará (Argentina, Brazil, and Paraguay in the wet forests of mata atlântica or "Selva Paranäense" at elevations from 100 to 950 metres [300 to 3,100 ft])
- S. bicorne Dunal — chilacayote, tomate de chichalaca, or toronjo (endemic to Mexico, in deciduous forests, grasslands, and humid montane forests at elevations from sea level to 2,000 metres [6,600 ft])
- Solanum cobanense J. L. Gentry (cloud forests of Honduras, Nicaragua, and Guatemala; 900 to 2,550 metres [3,000 to 8,400 ft])
- Solanum glaucescens Zucc. — cuatomate or zarza (endemic to southern Mexico in deciduous and semi-deciduous forests; 10 to 1,400 metres [0 to 4,600 ft])
- Solanum pachyandrum Bitter — bombona (western slopes of the Andes and in the Huancabamba Depression of Ecuador (Manabí) and Peru (Cajamarca, La Libertad, and Tumbes) in moist forests on slopes; 200 to 1,000 metres [700 to 3,300 ft])
- Solanum refractum Hook. & Arn. (Mexico, Guatemala, and Honduras in deciduous and semi-deciduous forests; from sea level to 1,100 metres [3,600 ft])
- Solanum triunfense S. Knapp — quistan (endemic to the Sierra Madre Occidental in the State of Chiapas, Mexico, in evergreen humid forests; 1,900 to 1,900 metres [6,200 to 6,200 ft])
- Solanum wendlandii Hook. f. — kishtan, cola de gato (probably native from southern Mexico to Panama in wet and semi-deciduous forests. Cultivated worldwide in tropics and subtropics; 400 to 2,200 metres [1,300 to 7,200 ft])

S. pachyandrum is differentiated from S. refractum by its white flowers and wider anthers and both are differentiated from the rest of the species by the fact that all filaments within a flower are of equal length.
