= Anna Casagrande =

Italian equestrian

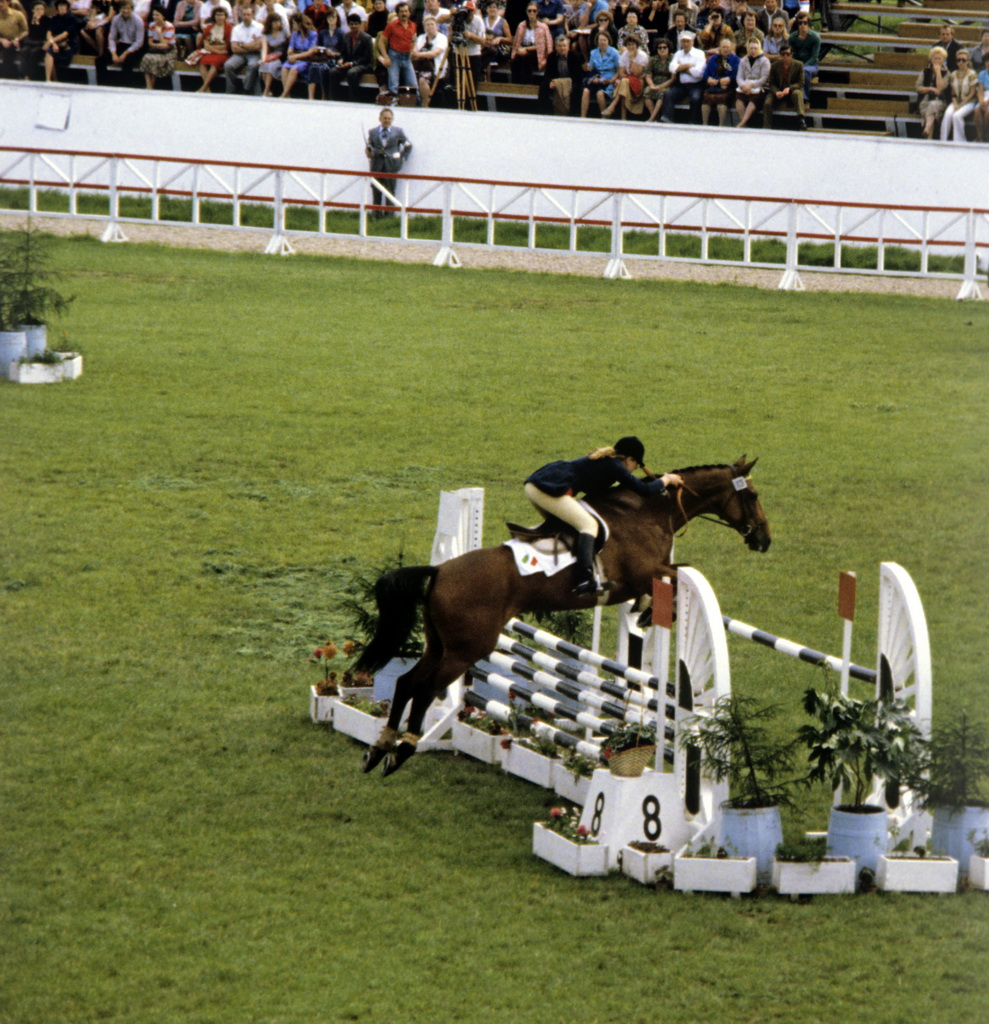
- Casagrande at 1980 Summer Olympics

Personal information
- Nationality: Italian
- Born: 26 July 1958 (age 67) Milan, Italy
- Height: 1.65 m (5 ft 5 in)
- Weight: 57 kg (126 lb)

Sport
- Country: Italy
- Sport: Equestrianism
- Event: Eventing
Medal record
Olympic Games
Silver medal – second place	1980 Moscow	Team eventing

Anna Casagrande (born 26 July 1958) is an Italian equestrian.

== Biography ==
Anna Casagrande won a team silver medal in eventing at the 1980 Summer Olympics in Moscow.

== Olympic results ==
Year	Competition	Venue	Position	Event	Score	Horse
1980	Olympic Games	(Soviet Union) Moscow	2nd	Team eventing	656.20	Daleye
1980	Olympic Games	(Soviet Union) Moscow	7th	Individual eventing	266.20	Daleye

== See also ==
- Italy at the 1980 Summer Olympics
