= Marina Sciocchetti =

Italian equestrian

Personal information
- Nationality: Italian
- Born: 13 November 1958 (age 68) Gallarate, Italy
- Height: 1.64 m (5 ft 4 1/2 in)
- Weight: 53 kg (117 lb)

Sport
- Country: Italy
- Sport: Equestrianism
- Event: Eventing
Medal record
Olympic Games
Silver medal – second place	1980 Moscow	Team eventing

Marina Sciocchetti (born 13 November 1958) is an Italian equestrian.

== Biography ==
Marina Sciocchetti won a team silver medal in eventing at the 1980 Summer Olympics in Moscow.

== Olympic results ==
Year	Competition	Venue	Position	Event	Score	Horse
1980	Olympic Games	(Soviet Union) Moscow	2nd	Team eventing	656.20	Rohan de Lechereo
1980	Olympic Games	(Soviet Union) Moscow	9th	Individual eventing	308.40	Rohan de Lechereo
1984	Olympic Games	(United States) Los Angeles	7th	Team eventing	280.70	Master Hunt
1984	Olympic Games	(United States) Los Angeles	7th	Individual eventing	67.00	Master Hunt

== See also ==
- Italy at the 1980 Summer Olympics
