= Federico Roman =

Italian equestrian

Personal information
- Full name: Federico Euro Roman
- Nationality: Italian
- Born: 29 July 1952 (age 73) Trieste, Italy

Sport
- Country: Italy
- Sport: Equestrianism
- Event: Eventing
Medal record
Olympic Games
Gold medal – first place	1980 Moscow	Individual eventing
Silver medal – second place	1980 Moscow	Team eventing

Federico Roman (born 29 July 1952) is an Italian equestrian and Olympic champion.

== Biography ==
Federico Roman won an individual gold medal in eventing at the 1980 Summer Olympics in Moscow. He was also a member of the Italian team that received a silver medal in team eventing at the same Olympics. He participated also to 1976 Summer Olympics and 1992 Summer Olympics. He is the brother of Mauro Roman.

His sons Luca and Pietro competed together at the 2016 Summer Olympics in Rio de Janeiro, Brazil.

== Olympic results ==
Year	Competition	Venue	Position	Event	Score	Horse
1976	Olympic Games	(Canada) Montreal	4th	Team eventing	682.24	Shamrock
1976	Olympic Games	(Canada) Montreal	9th	Individual eventing	194.14	Shamrock
1980	Olympic Games	(Soviet Union) Moscow	2nd	Team eventing	656.20	Rossinan
1980	Olympic Games	(Soviet Union) Moscow	1st	Individual eventing	108.60	Rossinan
1992	Olympic Games	(Spain) Barcelona	13th	Team eventing	534.65	Noriac
1992	Olympic Games	(Spain) Barcelona	47th	Individual eventing	190.20	Noriac

== See also ==
- Italy at the 1980 Summer Olympics
