= Bittsa Park =

Park in Moscow, Russia

Coordinates: 55°37.05′N 37°34.02′E

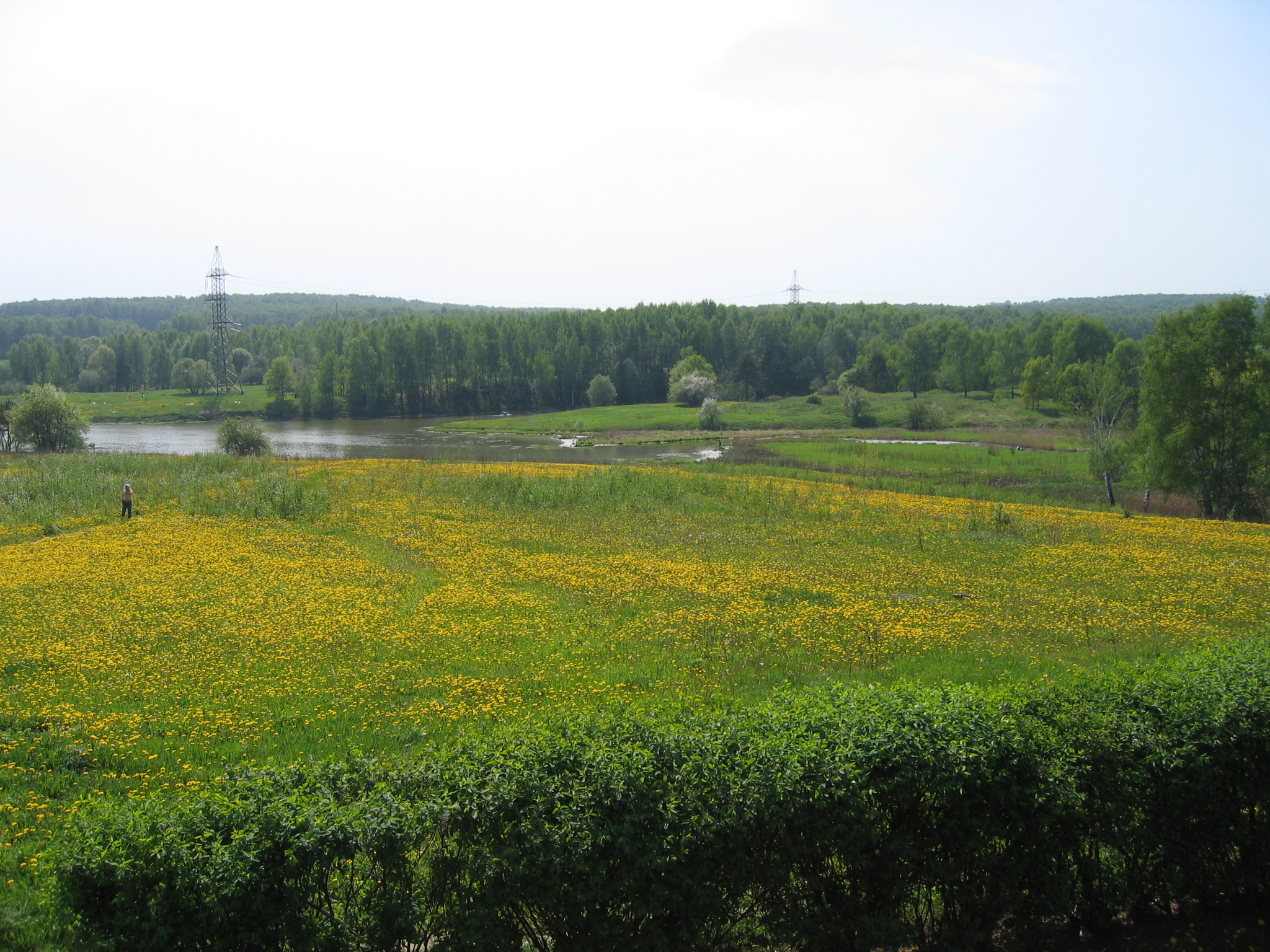
Bitsa Park, recreation area

Bittsevski Park (Russian: Битцевский парк), or Bittsa Park, is one of the largest forest parks in Moscow, Russia. The park sprawls for some 10 km (6.2 mi) from north to south and covers an area of 18 km^{2} (6.9 mi^{2}). The park is elongated from north to south and is bounded by Balaklavsky Avenue and Sevastopolsky Avenue from the north. It is one of the protected areas of Russia.

The rivers that flow in the park include Chertanovka River, Chertanovka River, and the Bittsa River,

The park is home to more than 500 species of plants, including lindens, oaks, and fine firs, planted by Mikhail Katkov's son at his family manor in the 19th century. 33 species of mammals and 78 species of birds have been registered in the park.

The grounds of the park contain the Moscow Paleontological Museum, as well as the 18th-century country estates of Uzkoye and Znamenskoye-Sadki and the reconstructed Yasenevo Estate, and soe other historical sites.

In 1974, the park was the location of the Bulldozer Exhibition. They skirt the Bittsa Equestrian Complex which was built for the 1980 Olympic Games.

== See also ==
- Bittsa Equestrian Complex
