= Mauro Roman =

Italian equestrian

Personal information
- Nationality: Italian
- Born: 27 March 1954 (age 72) Trieste, Italy
- Height: 1.78 m (5 ft 10 in)
- Weight: 69 kg (152 lb)

Sport
- Country: Italy
- Sport: Equestrianism
- Event: Eventing
Medal record
Olympic Games
Silver medal – second place	1980 Moscow	Team eventing

Mauro Roman (born 27 March 1954) is an Italian equestrian.

== Biography ==
Mauro Roman won a team silver medal in eventing at the 1980 Summer Olympics in Moscow. He is the brother of Federico Roman.

== Olympic results ==
Year	Competition	Venue	Position	Event	Score	Horse
1980	Olympic Games	(Soviet Union) Moscow	2nd	Team eventing	656.20	Dourakine
1980	Olympic Games	(Soviet Union) Moscow	8th	Individual eventing	218.40	Dourakine

== See also ==
- Italy at the 1980 Summer Olympics
