= Gerardo Tazzer =

Mexican equestrian

Medal record

Equestrian

Representing Mexico

Olympic Games
Bronze medal – third place	1980 Moscow	Team jumping

Pan American Games
Silver medal – second place	1979 San Juan	Individual jumping
Bronze medal – third place	1979 San Juan	Team jumping
Bronze medal – third place	1983 Caracas	Team jumping
Bronze medal – third place	1987 Indianapolis	Team jumping

Gerardo Tazzer Valencia (born 12 December 1951, in Mexico City) is a Mexican equestrian and Olympic medalist.
