= Elke-Karin Morciniec =

Polish equestrian

Personal information
- Nationality: Polish
- Born: 21 October 1943 (age 82) Wrocław, Poland

Sport
- Sport: Equestrian
Medal record
Equestrian
Representing Poland
Friendship Games
Silver medal – second place	1984 Wałbrzych	Team dressage

Elke Karin "Elżbieta" Morciniec (born 21 October 1943) is a Polish equestrian. She was born in Wrocław. She competed in dressage at the 1980 Summer Olympics in Moscow, where she placed fourth in the team competition with the Polish team (together with Józef Zagor and Wanda Wąsowska).
