= Khristo Kachev =

Bulgarian equestrian

Personal information
- Nationality: Bulgarian
- Born: 17 December 1953 (age 71)

Sport
- Sport: Equestrian

Khristo Kachev (Bulgarian: Христо Качев; born 17 December 1953) is a Bulgarian equestrian. He competed in the team jumping event at the 1980 Summer Olympics.
