= Niemojewo, Włocławek County =

Niemojewo
- Village
- Location within Poland
- Coordinates: 52°27′35″N 18°58′45″E
- Country: Poland
- Voivodeship: Kuyavian-Pomeranian
- County: Włocławek
- Gmina: Choceń

Niemojewo [ɲɛmɔˈjɛvɔ] is a village in the administrative district of Gmina Choceń, within Włocławek County, Kuyavian-Pomeranian Voivodeship, in north-central Poland.
