= Yuri Kovshov =

Soviet equestrian

Medal record

Equestrian

Representing the Soviet Union

Olympic Games
Gold medal – first place	1980 Moscow	Team dressage
Silver medal – second place	1980 Moscow	Individual dressage

World Championships
Silver medal – second place	1990 Stockholm	Team dressage

European Championships
Silver medal – second place	1989 Mondorf	Team dressage
Silver medal – second place	1991 Donaueschingen	Team dressage
Bronze medal – third place	1981 Laxenburg	Team dressage
Bronze medal – third place	1985 Copenhagen	Team dressage

Friendship Games
Gold medal – first place	1984 Wałbrzych	Individual dressage
Gold medal – first place	1984 Wałbrzych	Team dressage
Silver medal – second place	1984 Wałbrzych	Individual dressage

Yuri Aleksandrovich Kovshov (Russian: Юрий Александрович Ковшов; born 5 September 1951) is a former Ukrainian Soviet equestrian and Olympic champion. He was born in Kushka, Turkmen SSR, and was affiliated with VDFSO Kiev. He won a gold medal in team dressage at the 1980 Summer Olympics in Moscow, and received a silver medal in individual dressage.

His grandson Maksim took part at several dressage championships in the early 2010s.
