= Georgi Gadzhev =

Bulgarian equestrian

Personal information
- Nationality: Bulgarian
- Born: 8 June 1941 (age 85)

Sport
- Sport: Equestrian
Medal record
Representing Bulgaria
Olympic Games
Silver medal – second place	1980 Moscow	Team dressage

Georgi Gadzhev (Bulgarian: Георги Гаджев; born 8 June 1941) is a Bulgarian equestrian. He competed in two events at the 1980 Summer Olympics, winning a silver medal in the team dressage event.
