= Jan Kowalczyk =

Polish equestrian (1941–2020)

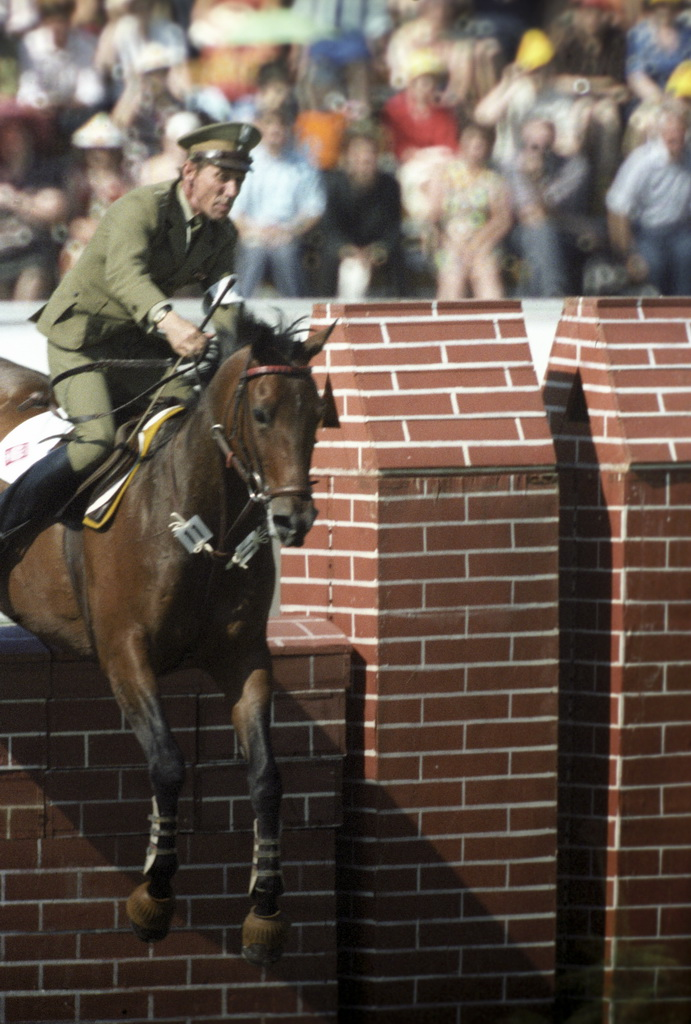
- Kowalczyk at the 1980 Olympics

Personal information
- Born: 18 December 1941 Drogomyśl, Poland
- Died: 24 February 2020 (aged 78) Warsaw
- Height: 169 cm (5 ft 7 in)
- Weight: 68 kg (150 lb)

Sport
- Sport: Show jumping
- Club: LSZ Drogomyśl; Cwału Poznań; Legia Warszawa
Medal record
Representing Poland
Olympic Games
Gold medal – first place	1980 Moscow	Individual jumping
Silver medal – second place	1980 Moscow	Team jumping
Friendship Games
Bronze medal – third place	1984 Sopot	Team jumping

Jan Kowalczyk (18 December 1941 – 24 February 2020) was a Polish show jumper who competed in the 1968, 1972 and 1980 Olympics. He won an individual gold and a team silver medal in 1980.
