= Znamenskoye-Sadki =

Coordinates: 55.580899°N 37.556112°E

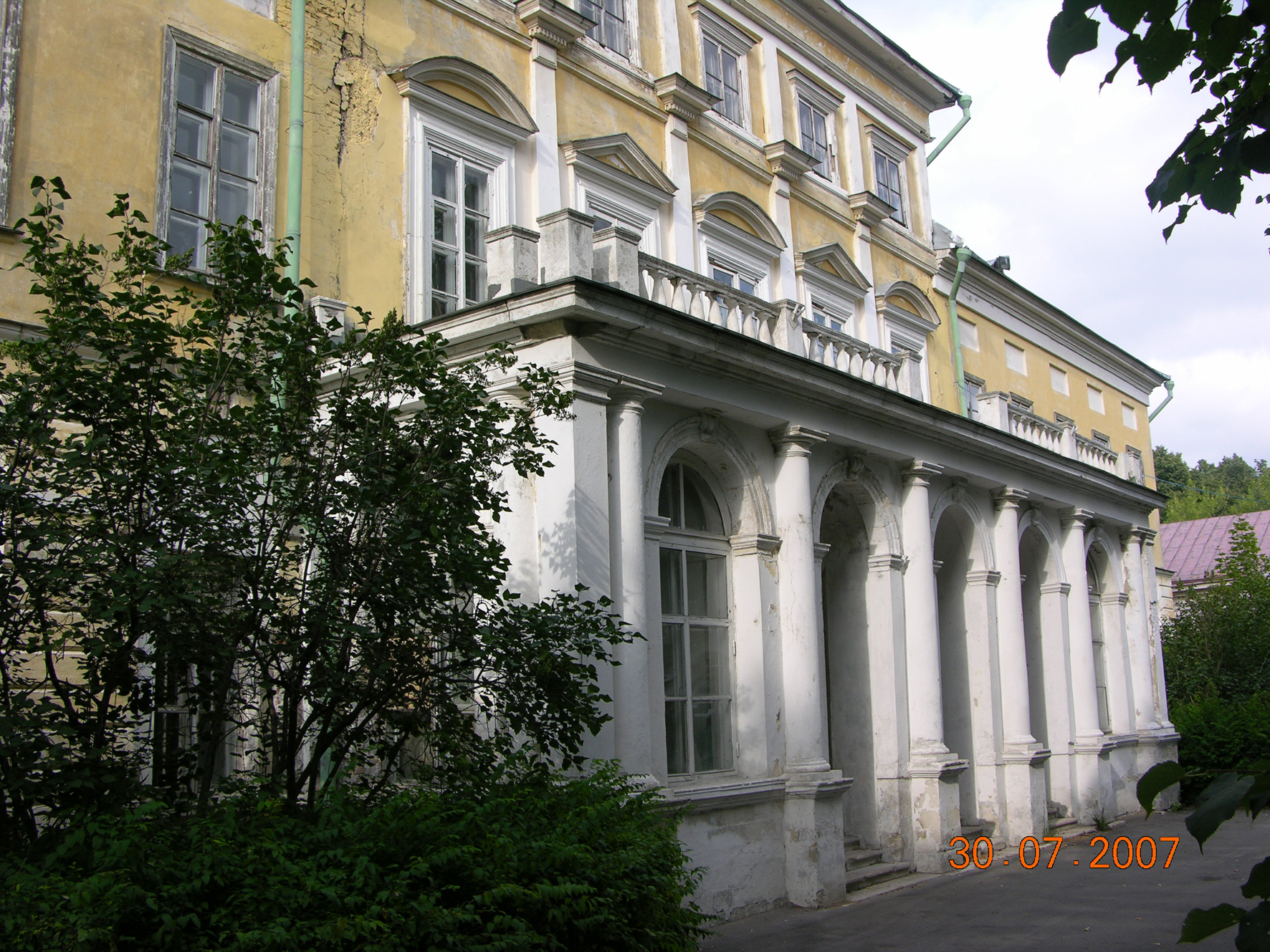
Москва. Дворец усадьбы Знаменское-Садки

Znamenskoye-Sadki is one of the oldest country estates of Moscow.

It lies in the southern section of Bitsa Park in the South-South-West of Moscow, outside today's MKAD. Since the middle of 18th century and almost until the October Revolution (1917) this estate belonged to the Trubetskoy family.

In the second half of the 18th century the main house, the church and the other buildings were built. At that time the system of ponds was constructed there.

Znamenskoye-Sadki was visited by many prominent men of letters and arts, the Grand Princes and Tsars. In 1787, Empress Catherine II of Russia came there with her grandsons. One of them was the future Emperor Alexander I of Russia.

Pyotr Vyazemsky and Fyodor Tyutchev used to stay in the estate.

On the second day after their wedding, the future parents of Leo Tolstoy visited there. They were married in the church of Yasenevo on 9 July 1822.

Historian Mikhail Pogodin stayed and worked there in the 1820s. He spent a lot of time in the large library of the estate.

In 1918 the main house of Znamenskoye-Sadki estate passed to a workers' cooperative.

In 1929 the church was dismantled. Currently the estate is a neglected park with remaining ponds, the central house and ruins of the stables. In the restored central house there is the Institute of Nature Preservation.

The constructions are closed for the general public as of 2010.

== Sources ==
- Усадебное ожерелье юго-запада Москвы. М.:Мосгорархив, 1997
- Двинский Э. Кольца и радиусы Москвы. М:Московский рабочий, 1986.
- Романюк С. По землям московских сёл и слобод. М.:ЗАО «Сварог и К», 1998.
