= Yuri Salnikov =

Soviet equestrian

Medal record

Equestrian

Representing the Soviet Union

Olympic Games
Gold medal – first place	1980 Moscow	Team eventing
Bronze medal – third place	1980 Moscow	Individual eventing

European Championships
Silver medal – second place	1973 Kiev	Team eventing

Friendship Games
Silver medal – second place	1984 Drzonków	Team eventing

Yuri Salnikov (born 6 June 1950) is a former Soviet equestrian and Olympic champion. He won a team gold medal in eventing at the 1980 Summer Olympics in Moscow.
