= Dumitru Velea =

Romanian equestrian

Personal information
- Nationality: Romanian
- Born: 11 February 1944 (age 82) Bucharest, Romania

Sport
- Sport: Equestrian

Dumitru Velea (born 11 February 1944) is a Romanian equestrian. He competed in the team jumping event at the 1980 Summer Olympics.
