= Elisabeth Theurer =

Austrian equestrian

Elisabeth Max-Theurer
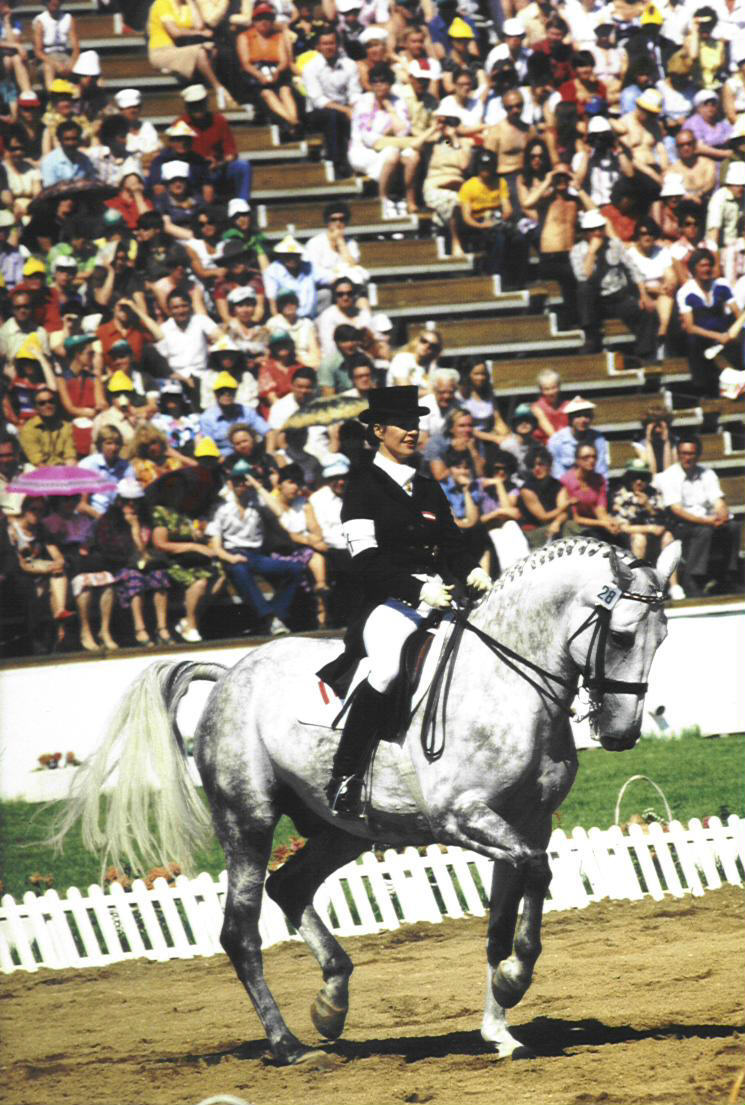
- Theurer and Mon Cherie, in their gold-medal performance at the 1980 Olympics

Personal information
- Born: 20 September 1956 (age 69) Linz, Oberösterreich, Austria
- Height: 168 cm (5 ft 6 in)
- Weight: 60 kg (132 lb)

Sport
- Sport: Equestrian
- Event: Dressage
- Club: RV Stall Kürnberg, Pasching
Medal record
Representing Austria
Olympic Games
Gold medal – first place	1980 Moscow	Individual dressage
European Championships
Gold medal – first place	1979 Aarhus	Individual dressage

Elisabeth "Sissy" Theurer (born 20 September 1956) is an equestrian from Austria, now known as Elisabeth Max-Theurer after marriage.

== Biography ==
She began horse riding at age 10. In 1968 she met Hans Max, a riding instructor, in cooperation with whom she achieved her main results and whom she married fifteen years later. In 1973 she received Mon Cherie, a gray horse, as a bonus while buying another one. Mon Cherie's first steps were rather disappointing, but after consequent and persistent work he became very skillful, famous for his piaffe-passage tour and pirouettes.{fact}

At the 1979 European Dressage Championships in Aarhus Theurer with Mon Cherie won the gold medal. A year later on Mon Cherie she became an Olympic champion.

Various international successes followed. On another horse, Acapulco, she participated at the 1984 Summer Olympics and came in 11th. After breaks for the birth of her daughter Victoria (in 1985) and son Johannes (in 1987), Theurer returned to competition and participated in the 1992 Summer Olympics, where she competed on the horse Liechtenstein, finishing 8th.

After finishing her career in 1994, Theurer now supports her daughter Victoria, who is also an Olympic equestrian. Theurer has also been the President of the Austrian Association for Riding and Carriage Driving since 2002.

Theurer is also a shareholder in the Plasser & Theurer company which manufactures rail track laying and maintenance machines.

Elisabeth Max-Theurer became a FEI 5* (Olympic) Judge in 2018.
