= Alexandru Bozan =

Romanian equestrian

Personal information
- Nationality: Romanian
- Born: 10 October 1948 (age 76); Sibiu, Romania

Sport
- Sport: Equestrian

Alexandru Bozan (born 10 October 1948) is a Romanian equestrian. He competed in the team jumping event at the 1980 Summer Olympics.
