= Joaquín Pérez (equestrian) =

Mexican equestrian (1936–2011)

Medal record

Equestrian

Representing Mexico

Olympic Games
Bronze medal – third place	1980 Moscow	Individual jumping
Bronze medal – third place	1980 Moscow	Team jumping

Pan American Games
Silver medal – second place	1971 Cali	Team jumping

Joaquín Pérez de las Heras (25 October 1936 – 20 May 2011) was a Mexican equestrian and Olympic medalist. He was born in Ameca, Jalisco.
