= Equestrian Premier League =

Equestrian Premier League is the Embassy International Riding School's Equestrian tournament that holds Dressage and Jumping competitions. It is aimed at raising the Equestrian standards in India, providing a platform to riders to increase their fitness and confidence levels, with the ultimate aim of making riders internationally competitive in Equestrian Sports.

EPL was started in 2009 and since then has become one of the best competitions of the equestrian calendar in the country.
