= Janusz Bobik =

Polish equestrian

Medal record

Equestrian

Representing Poland

Olympic Games
Silver medal – second place	1980 Moscow	Team jumping

Friendship Games
Bronze medal – third place	1984 Sopot	Team jumping

Janusz Bobik (born 17 December 1955 in Środa Śląska) is a Polish show jumping equestrian, Olympic medalist from 1980.

== Olympic record ==
Bobik participated at the 1980 Summer Olympics in Moscow, where he won a silver medal in team jumping.
