= Viktor Asmaev =

Russian equestrian

Personal information
- Nationality: Russian
- Born: 16 November 1947 Rostov-on-Don
- Died: 12 October 2002 (aged 54)

Sport
- Sport: Equestrian
Medal record
Equestrian
Representing the Soviet Union
Olympic Games
| Gold medal – first place | 1980 Moscow | Team jumping |

Viktor Karpovich Asmayev (Russian: Виктор Карпович Асмаев; 16 November 1947 in Rostov-on-Don – 12 October 2002) was an equestrian and Olympic champion from Russia. He won a gold medal in show jumping with the Soviet team at the 1980 Summer Olympics in Moscow, Russia.
