= Equestrian events at the 1987 Pan American Games =

Equestrian events at the 1983 Pan American Games

Equestrian competitions were contested by participating nations at the 1987 Pan American Games.

== Events ==
Event	Gold	Silver	Bronze
Individual dressage	Christilot Hanson-Boylen; Canada	Martina Pracht; Canada	Margarita Nava; Mexico
Team dressage	Canada	United States	Mexico
Individual jumping	Ian Millar; Canada	Rodney Jenkins; United States	Alberto Valdés, Jr. Mexico
Team jumping	Canada	United States	Mexico
Individual three day	Mike Huber; United States	Emily MacGowan; United States	Peter Gray; Bermuda
Team three day	United States	Canada	Chile

=== Medal table ===
Rank	Nation	Gold	Silver	Bronze	Total
1	Canada	4	2	0	6
2	United States	2	4	0	6
3	Mexico	0	0	4	4
4	Bermuda	0	0	1	1
4	Chile	0	0	1	1
Totals (5 entries)		6	6	6	18

== See also ==
- Equestrian events at the 1988 Summer Olympics
