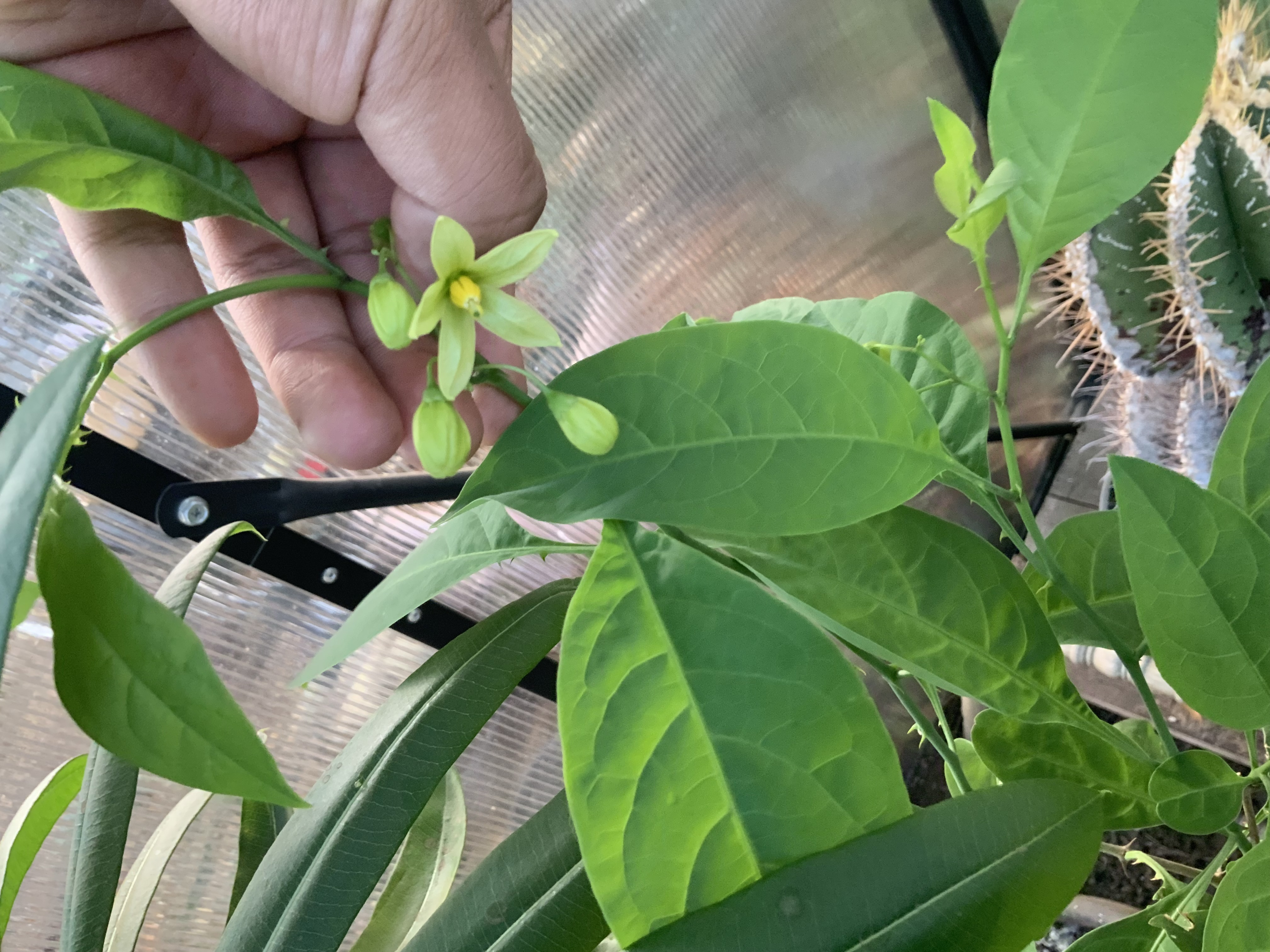

Scientific classification
- Kingdom: Plantae
- Clade: Tracheophytes
- Clade: Angiosperms
- Clade: Eudicots
- Clade: Asterids
- Order: Solanales
- Family: Solanaceae
- Genus: Solanum
- Species: S. glaucescens

Binomial name
- Solanum glaucescens Zucc.

Synonyms
- Solanum hamatile Brandegee; Solanum lanceifolium var. sagranum (A.Rich.) M.Gómez; Solanum oaxacanum Dunal; Solanum sagraeanum A.Rich.; Solanum sagranum A.Rich.

= Solanum glaucescens =

Species of flowering plant

Solanum glaucescens is a species of flowering plant in the family Solanaceae and is endemic to Mexico. It is a deciduous vine with narrowly oblong to egg-shaped leaves 35–90 mm (1.4–3.5 in) long and 15–55 mm (0.59–2.17 in) wide on a petiole 10–40 mm (0.39–1.57 in) long. The flowers are arranged in groups of five to twelve on a peduncle 10–20 mm (0.39–0.79 in) long, each flower on a pedicel 5–10 mm (0.20–0.39 in) long but elongating to 30–40 mm (1.2–1.6 in) by the fruiting stage. The sepals form a bell-shaped tube 2–4 mm (0.079–0.157 in) long with five lobes. The petals are pale yellow to greenish, 20–40 mm (0.79–1.57 in) long and joined at the base with spreading, star-like lobes and there are ten to fifteen stamens. The edible fruit also known as cuatomate is a berry that is green at first, later turning orange.

This species was first formally described in 1837 by Joseph Gerhard Zuccarini in Abhandlungen der Mathematisch-Physikalischen Classe der Königlich Bayerischen Akademie der Wissenschaften.

Solanum glaucescens is endemic to Mexico where it grows in forest, and has been introduced to Cuba.
