= Nikolai Korolkov =

Russian equestrian (1946–2024)

Medal record

Equestrian

Representing the Soviet Union

Olympic Games
Gold medal – first place	1980 Moscow	Team jumping
Silver medal – second place	1980 Moscow	Individual jumping

Nikolay Pavlovich Korolkov (Russian: Николай Павлович Корольков; 28 November 1946 – 5 July 2024) was an equestrian and Olympic champion from Russia. He was born in Rostov-on-Don. He won a gold medal in show jumping with the Soviet team and an individual silver medal at the 1980 Summer Olympics in Moscow. Korolkov died on 5 July 2024, at the age of 77.
