= Svetoslav Ivanov =

Bulgarian equestrian

Personal information
- Nationality: Bulgarian
- Born: 16 December 1951 (age 74)

Sport
- Sport: Equestrian
Medal record
Representing Bulgaria
Olympic Games
Silver medal – second place	1980 Moscow	Team dressage

Svetoslav Ivanov (Bulgarian: Светослав Иванов, born 16 December 1951) is a Bulgarian equestrian. He competed in two events at the 1980 Summer Olympics, winning a silver medal in the team dressage event.
