= Dania Popescu =

Romanian equestrian

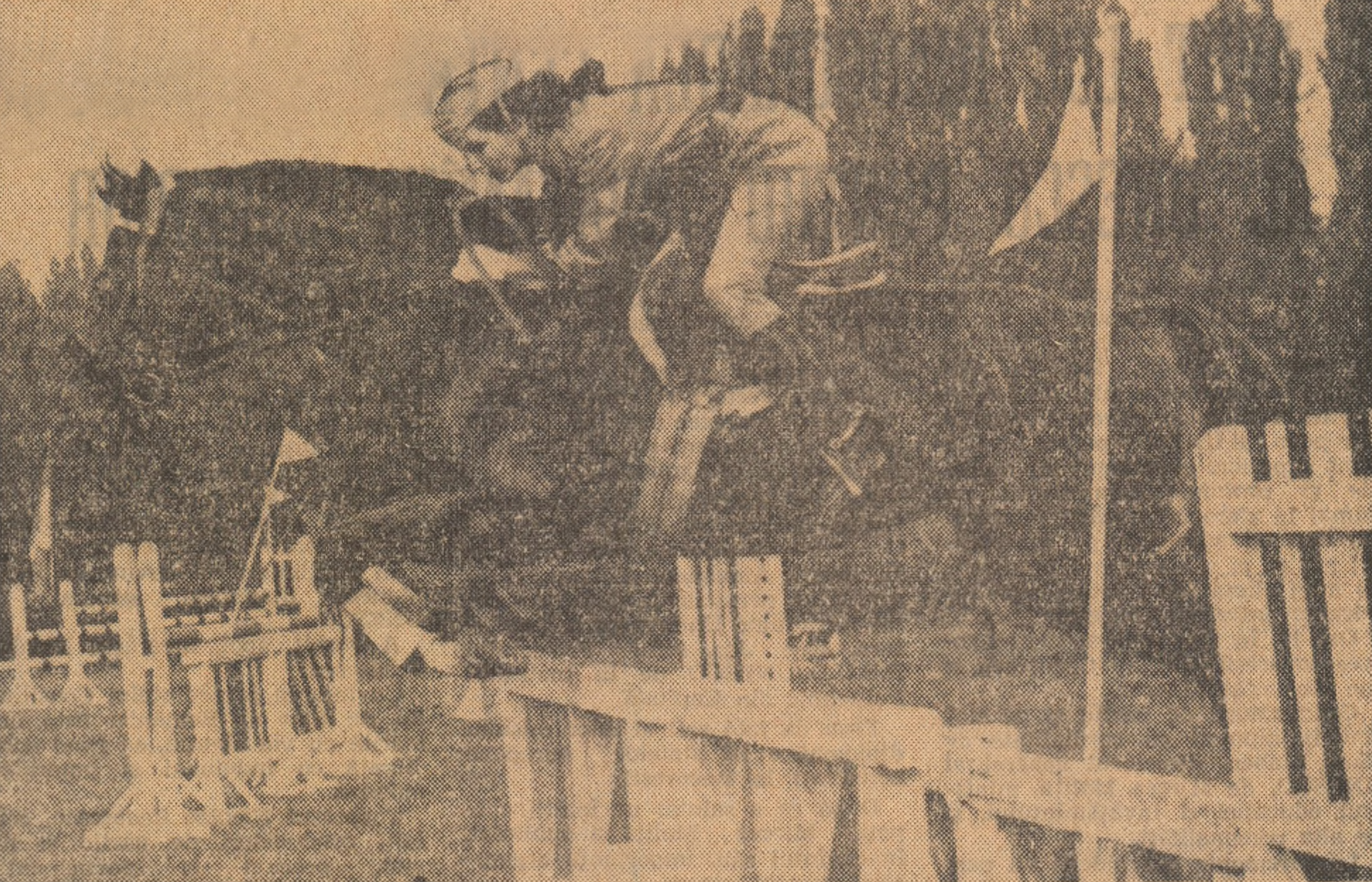
- Dania Popescu in 1972

Personal information
- Nationality: Romanian
- Born: 11 June 1956 (age 70) Bucharest, Romania

Sport
- Sport: Equestrian

Dania Popescu (born 11 June 1956) is a Romanian equestrian. She competed in the team jumping event at the 1980 Summer Olympics.
