= András Balogi =

Hungarian equestrian (1941–2001)

Personal information
- Nationality: Hungarian
- Born: 4 August 1941; Cserépfalu, Hungary
- Died: 25 March 2000 (aged 58); Mezőhegyes, Hungary

Sport
- Sport: Equestrian

András Balogi (4 August 1941 – 25 March 2000) was a Hungarian equestrian. He competed in the team jumping event at the 1980 Summer Olympics.
