= Tsvetan Donchev =

Bulgarian equestrian

Personal information
- Nationality: Bulgarian
- Born: 6 July 1953 (age 71)

Sport
- Sport: Equestrian

Tsvetan Donchev (Bulgarian: Цветан Дончев, born 6 July 1953) is a Bulgarian equestrian. He competed in two events at the 1980 Summer Olympics.
