= Petre Roșca =

Romanian equestrian

Medal record

Equestrian

Representing Romania

Olympic Games
Bronze medal – third place	1980 Moscow	Team dressage

Petre Roşca (22 October 1922 – 1981) was a Romanian equestrian and Olympic medalist. He was born in Ploiești. He competed in dressage at the 1980 Summer Olympics in Moscow, where he won a bronze medal with the Romanian team, along with Anghelache Donescu and Dumitru Velicu. He also placed eleventh in individual dressage at the 1980 Olympics.
