= Dzhenko Sabev =

Bulgarian equestrian (1947–2020)

Personal information
- Nationality: Bulgarian
- Born: 2 June 1947
- Died: 30 April 2020 (aged 72)

Sport
- Sport: Equestrian

Dzhenko Sabev (Bulgarian: Дженко Събев; 2 June 1947 – 30 April 2020) was a Bulgarian equestrian. He competed in two events at the 1980 Summer Olympics.
