= Vira Misevych =

Ukrainian equestrian

Medal record

Equestrian

Representing Soviet Union

Olympic Games
Gold medal – first place	1980 Moscow	Team dressage

European Championships
Bronze medal – third place	1977 St. Gallen	Team dressage
Bronze medal – third place	1981 Laxenburg	Team dressage

Vira Misevych (Ukrainian: Віра Місевич; 10 April 1945 – 4 March 1995) was an equestrian from Soviet Union and Olympic champion. She won a gold medal in dressage with the Soviet team at the 1980 Summer Olympics in Moscow, which all competitive equestrian teams boycotted.
