= Vyacheslav Chukanov =

Soviet equestrian (born 1952)

Medal record

Equestrian

Representing the Soviet Union

Olympic Games
Gold medal – first place	1980 Moscow	Team jumping

Vyacheslav Chukanov (born 24 April 1952) is a Soviet equestrian and Olympic champion. He won a gold medal in show jumping with the Soviet team at the 1980 Summer Olympics in Moscow.

== Personal life ==
His son Andrea Chukanov is a professional football player.
