= Dimo Khristov =

Bulgarian equestrian

Personal information
- Nationality: Bulgarian
- Born: 12 November 1952 (age 72)

Sport
- Sport: Equestrian

Dimo Khristov (Bulgarian: Димо Христов, born 12 November 1952) is a Bulgarian equestrian. He competed in two events at the 1980 Summer Olympics.
