= Marian Kozicki =

Polish equestrian

Medal record

Equestrian

Representing Poland

Olympic Games
Silver medal – second place	1980 Moscow	Team jumping

Marian Kozicki (born 5 April 1941, in Brody near Poznań) is a Polish show jumping champion, who won an Olympic silver medal in 1980.

== Olympic Record ==
Kozicki participated at the 1980 Summer Olympics in Moscow, where he won a silver medal in team jumping.
