= Viktor Poganovsky =

Soviet equestrian (born 1949)

Medal record

Equestrian

Representing the Soviet Union

Olympic Games
| Gold medal – first place | 1980 Moscow | Team jumping |

Viktor Poganovsky (born 23 November 1949) is a Ukrainian Soviet equestrian and Olympic champion. He was in the equestrian school from the age of 12.

In 1965, he took a part in the national competitions among youth and was included in the national team. In 1976, finished studying at Sukhomlynskyi Mykolaiv National University. Presented "Kolos" (Mykolaiv). He became the USSR champion 20 times, SSR champion 15 times, repeatedly won in international competitions.

He won a gold medal in show jumping with the Soviet team at the 1980 Summer Olympics in Moscow.

He has been a main trainer in Mykolaiv Equestrian School since 1992.
