= Fabián Vázquez =

Mexican equestrian

Personal information
- Born: 20 January 1943 Zimapán, Hidalgo
Medal record
Equestrian
Representing Mexico
Olympic Games
Bronze medal – third place	1980 Moscow	Team eventing

Fabián Vázquez (born 20 January 1943) is a Mexican equestrian. He was born in Zimapán, Hidalgo. He won a bronze medal in team eventing at the 1980 Summer Olympics in Moscow.
