= Trifon Datsinski =

Bulgarian equestrian (born 1953)

Personal information
- Nationality: Bulgarian
- Born: 2 February 1953 (age 72)

Sport
- Sport: Equestrian

Trifon Datsinski (Bulgarian: Трифон Дацински; born 2 February 1953) is a Bulgarian equestrian. He competed in two events at the 1980 Summer Olympics.
