= Jesús Gómez (equestrian) =

Mexican equestrian (1941–2017)

Medal record

Equestrian

Representing Mexico

Olympic Games
| Bronze medal – third place | 1980 Moscow | Team jumping |

Jesús Gómez Portugal Montenegro (14 May 1941 – 25 November 2017) was a Mexican equestrian and Olympic medalist. He was born in Mexico City. He died on 25 November 2017.
