= István Grózner =

Hungarian equestrian

Personal information
- Nationality: Hungarian
- Born: 22 July 1955; Nova, Hungary
- Died: 16 September 1993 (aged 38); Zala, Hungary

Sport
- Sport: Equestrian

István Grózner (22 July 1955 – 16 September 1993) was a Hungarian equestrian. He competed in two events at the 1980 Summer Olympics.
