= Stanisław Jasiński =

Polish equestrian

Personal information
- Nationality: Polish
- Born: 13 November 1959 (age 65); Czerwin, Poland

Sport
- Sport: Equestrian

Stanisław Jasiński (born 13 November 1959) is a Polish equestrian. He competed in two events at the 1980 Summer Olympics.
