= Sergey Rogozhin =

Soviet equestrian

Medal record

Equestrian

Representing the Soviet Union

Olympic Games
Gold medal – first place	1980 Moscow	Team eventing

Sergey Nikolayevich Rogozhin (Russian: Серге́й Николаевич Рогожин; 6 July 1956 – 31 May 1983) was a Soviet equestrian and Olympic champion. He won a team gold medal in eventing at the 1980 Summer Olympics in Moscow.
