= Zoltán Horváth (equestrian) =

Hungarian equestrian

Personal information
- Nationality: Hungarian
- Born: 1 November 1954 (age 70); Sárvár, Hungary

Sport
- Sport: Equestrian

Zoltán Horváth (born 1 November 1954) is a Hungarian equestrian. He competed in two events at the 1980 Summer Olympics.
