= Ferenc Krucsó =

Hungarian equestrian

Personal information
- Nationality: Hungarian
- Born: 8 September 1951 (age 73); Mezőhegyes, Hungary

Sport
- Sport: Equestrian

Ferenc Krucsó (born 8 September 1951) is a Hungarian equestrian. He competed in two events at the 1980 Summer Olympics.
