= Valery Volkov =

Soviet equestrian

Medal record

Equestrian

Representing the Soviet Union

Olympic Games
Gold medal – first place	1980 Moscow	Team eventing

Valery Yakovlevich Volkov (Russian: Валерий Яковлевич Волков; born 26 July 1947, in Yaroslavl) is a former Soviet equestrian and Olympic champion. He won a team gold medal in eventing at the 1980 Summer Olympics in Moscow.
