= Wiesław Hartman =

Polish equestrian (1950–2021)

Medal record

Equestrian

Representing Poland

Olympic Games
| Silver medal – second place | 1980 Moscow | Team jumping |

Friendship Games
| Bronze medal – third place | 1984 Sopot | Team jumping |

Wiesław Hartman (23 October 1950 – 24 November 2021) was a Polish show jumping equestrian and Olympic medalist.

== Life and career ==
Hartman was born in Kwidzyn, Poland, on 23 October 1950. He participated in the 1980 Summer Olympics in Moscow, where he won a silver medal in team jumping. Hartman died on 24 November 2021, at the age of 71.
