= José Luis Pérez (equestrian) =

Mexican equestrian (born 1943)

Personal information
- Born: 18 June 1943 (age 83) Tonaya, Jalisco
Medal record
Equestrian
Representing Mexico
Olympic Games
Bronze medal – third place	1980 Moscow	Team eventing

José Luis Pérez (born 18 June 1943) is a Mexican equestrian. He was born in Tonalá, Jalisco. He won a bronze medal in team eventing at the 1980 Summer Olympics in Moscow. He also competed at the 1976 Summer Olympics.
