= Petar Mandajiev =

Bulgarian equestrian (1929–2008)

Medal record

Equestrian

Representing Bulgaria

Olympic Games
Silver medal – second place	1980 Moscow	Team dressage

Petar Mandajiev (Bulgarian: Петър Мандаджиев; 6 November 1929 – 2008) was a Bulgarian equestrian and Olympic medalist. He won a silver medal in dressage at the 1980 Summer Olympics in Moscow.
