= Dumitru Velicu =

Romanian equestrian

Medal record

Equestrian

Representing Romania

Olympic Games
Bronze medal – third place	1980 Moscow	Team dressage

Dumitru Velicu (26 October 1930 – 1997) was a Romanian equestrian and Olympic medalist. He was born in Râmnicu Vâlcea. He competed in dressage at the 1980 Summer Olympics in Moscow, where he won a bronze medal with the Romanian team, along with Anghelache Donescu and Petre Roşca. He placed twelfth in individual dressage at the 1980 Olympics.
