= Dimitar Genov =

Bulgarian equestrian

Personal information
- Nationality: Bulgarian
- Born: 16 August 1947 (age 77)

Sport
- Sport: Equestrian

Dimitar Genov (Bulgarian: Димитър Генов; born 16 August 1947) is a Bulgarian equestrian. He competed in two events at the 1980 Summer Olympics.
