= Jacek Daniluk =

Polish equestrian

Personal information
- Nationality: Polish
- Born: 1 September 1961; Kwidzyn, Poland
- Died: 6 September 1986 (aged 25); Poznań, Poland

Sport
- Sport: Equestrian

Jacek Daniluk (1 September 1961 – 6 September 1986) was a Polish equestrian. He competed in two events at the 1980 Summer Olympics.
