= Viktor Ugryumov =

Soviet equestrian

Medal record

Equestrian

Representing Soviet Union

Olympic Games
Gold medal – first place	1980 Moscow	Team dressage
Bronze medal – third place	1980 Moscow	Individual dressage

World Championships
Bronze medal – third place	1978 Goodwood	Team dressage

European Championships
Silver medal – second place	1979 Aarhus	Team dressage

Viktor Petrovich Ugryumov (Russian: Виктор Петрович Угрюмов, born 19 August 1939) is a former Soviet equestrian and Olympic champion. He won a gold medal in team dressage at the 1980 Summer Olympics in Moscow.
