= Anghelache Donescu =

Romanian equestrian (1945–2023)

Medal record

Equestrian

Representing Romania

Olympic Games
Bronze medal – third place	1980 Moscow	Team dressage

Anghelache Donescu (18 October 1945 – 28 August 2023) was a Romanian equestrian and Olympic medalist. He was born in Bucharest. He competed in dressage at the 1980 Summer Olympics in Moscow, where he won a bronze medal with the Romanian team, along with Petre Roșca and Dumitru Velicu. He also placed sixth in individual dressage at the 1980 Olympics. Donescu died on 28 August 2023, at the age of 77.
