= Aleksandr Blinov (equestrian) =

Soviet equestrian (1954–2021)

Medal record

Equestrian

Representing the Soviet Union

Olympic Games
Gold medal – first place	1980 Moscow	Team eventing
Silver medal – second place	1980 Moscow	Individual eventing

Aleksandr Ivanovich Blinov (19 August 1954 – 9 February 2021) was a Russian Soviet equestrian and Olympic champion, born in Frunze, Kirghiz SSR. He won a team gold medal in eventing at the 1980 Summer Olympics in Moscow.

== Death ==
His daughter was in contact with Blinov by telephone on February 9, 2021. He planned to take the bus from Andreyevskoye to Mozhaisk to visit the bank. In the evening, his daughter could not get in contact with him and he was reported missing. Blinov's body was found three weeks later on March 2, 2021. On the evening of February 9, he appears to have been dropped off by a taxi 500m from his house. The taxi couldn't get any closer due to the snow.
