= Manuel Mendívil =

Mexican equestrian

Personal information
- Born: 24 August 1935 Huatabampo, Sonora
- Died: 15 August 2015 (aged 79)
Medal record
Equestrian
Representing Mexico
Olympic Games
Bronze medal – third place	1980 Moscow	Team eventing
Pan American Games
Gold medal – first place	1971 Cali	Individual eventing
Bronze medal – third place	1967 Winnipeg	Team jumping
Bronze medal – third place	1975 Mexico City	Team eventing

Manuel Mendívil (24 August 1935 – 15 August 2015) was a Mexican equestrian. He was born in Huatabampo, Sonora. He won a bronze medal in team eventing at the 1980 Summer Olympics in Moscow. He also competed at the 1964 and 1972 Summer Olympics.

He won the individual gold medal in three day eventing at the Pan American Games of 1971 in Cali, Colombia

Mendivil died on August 15, 2015, at the age of 79.
