= Alberto Valdés Jr. =

Mexican equestrian (1950–2020)

Medal record

Equestrian

Representing Mexico

Olympic Games
Bronze medal – third place	1980 Moscow	Team jumping

Pan American Games
Bronze medal – third place	1987 Indianapolis	Individual jumping
Bronze medal – third place	1987 Indianapolis	Team jumping

Alberto Valdés Lacarra Jr. (30 November 1950 – 19 December 2020) was a Mexican equestrian and Olympic medalist. He is the son of Alberto Valdés, another Olympic equestrian.
