= Ioan Popa (equestrian) =

Romanian equestrian (born 1949)

Personal information
- Nationality: Romanian
- Born: 10 May 1949 (age 75)

Sport
- Sport: Equestrian

Ioan Popa (born 10 May 1949) is a Romanian equestrian. He competed in the team jumping event at the 1980 Summer Olympics.
