= Mihály Oláh =

Hungarian equestrian

Personal information
- Nationality: Hungarian
- Born: 25 January 1949; Tét, Hungary
- Died: 8 February 2023 (aged 74)

Sport
- Sport: Equestrian

Mihály Oláh (25 January 1949 – 8 February 2023) was a Hungarian equestrian. He competed in two events at the 1980 Summer Olympics.
