= Barnabás Hevesy =

Hungarian equestrian (born 1950)

Personal information
- Nationality: Hungarian
- Born: 26 April 1950 (age 74); Budapest, Hungary

Sport
- Sport: Equestrian

Barnabás Hevesy (born 26 April 1950) is a Hungarian equestrian. He competed in two events at the 1980 Summer Olympics.
