= Jacek Wierzchowiecki =

Polish equestrian

Personal information
- Nationality: Polish
- Born: 30 March 1944; Wieniawa, Poland
- Died: 1 September 2015 (aged 71); Poznań, Poland

Sport
- Sport: Equestrian

Jacek Wierzchowiecki (30 March 1944 – 1 September 2015) was a Polish equestrian. He competed in the 1972 Summer Olympics and the 1980 Summer Olympics.
