= Wanda Wąsowska =

Polish equestrian

Personal information
- Nationality: Polish
- Born: 28 June 1931 (age 93); Niemojewo, Włocławek County

Sport
- Sport: Equestrian

Wanda Wąsowska (born 28 June 1931) is a Polish equestrian. She was born in Niemojewo in Włocławek County. She competed in dressage at the 1980 Summer Olympics in Moscow, where she placed fourth in the team competition.
