= László Cseresnyés =

Hungarian equestrian

Personal information
- Nationality: Hungarian
- Born: 30 July 1958 (age 66); Balatonalmádi, Hungary

Sport
- Sport: Equestrian

László Cseresnyés (born 30 July 1958) is a Hungarian equestrian. He competed in two events at the 1980 Summer Olympics.
