= Mirosław Szłapka =

Polish equestrian

Medal record

Equestrian

Representing Poland

European Championships
| Bronze medal – third place | 1981 Horsens | Team eventing |

Friendship Games
| Gold medal – first place | 1984 Drzonków | Team eventing |
| Silver medal – second place | 1984 Drzonków | Individual eventing |

Mirosław Szłapka (born 19 September 1956) is a Polish equestrian. He was born in Buk, then in the Poznań Voivodeship, currently within the Greater Poland Voivodeship. He competed in eventing at the 1980 Summer Olympics in Moscow, where he placed sixth in the individual competition.
