= Hussain Khan =

Indian equestrian

Personal information
- Born: 10 September 1944 (age 81)

Sport
- Sport: Equestrian

Hussain Khan (born 10 September 1944) is an Indian equestrian. He competed in two events at the 1980 Summer Olympics.
