= Boris Pavlov (equestrian) =

Bulgarian equestrian

Personal information
- Born: 15 April 1946 (age 80)
- Height: 182 cm (6 ft 0 in)
- Weight: 76 kg (168 lb)

Sport
- Sport: Horse riding
- Event: Show jumping

Boris Pavlov (Bulgarian: Борис Павлов, born 15 April 1946) is a retired Bulgarian equestrian. He competed in the individual and team show jumping events at the 1980 Summer Olympics and placed tenth and sixth, respectively.
