= Darya Singh =

Indian equestrian

Personal information
- Nationality: Indian
- Born: 5 September 1947 (age 79)

Sport
- Sport: Equestrian

Darya Singh (born 5 September 1947) is an Indian equestrian. He competed in two events at the 1980 Summer Olympics.
