= Jitendarjit Singh Ahluwalia =

Indian equestrian (born 1955)

Personal information
- Nationality: India
- Born: 9 May 1955 (age 71)
- Height: 1.79 m (5 ft 10 in)
- Weight: 69 kg (152 lb)

Sport
- Sport: Equestrian
Medal record
Equestrian
Representing India
Asian Games
Bronze medal – third place	1986 Seoul	Team dressage

Jitendarjit Singh Ahluwalia (born 9 May 1955) is an Indian equestrian. He competed in the 1980 Summer Olympics. in 2 events.
