= Józef Zagor =

Polish equestrian

Personal information
- Nationality: Polish
- Born: 16 November 1940 (age 85) Derło, Poland

Sport
- Sport: Equestrian

Józef Zagor (born 16 November 1940) is a Polish equestrian. He was born in Derło. He competed in dressage at the 1980 Summer Olympics in Moscow, where he placed fourth in the team competition and tenth in the individual dressage.
