= Bittsa Equestrian Complex =

Russian horse riding club

Coordinates: 55°38′31″N 37°34′59″E

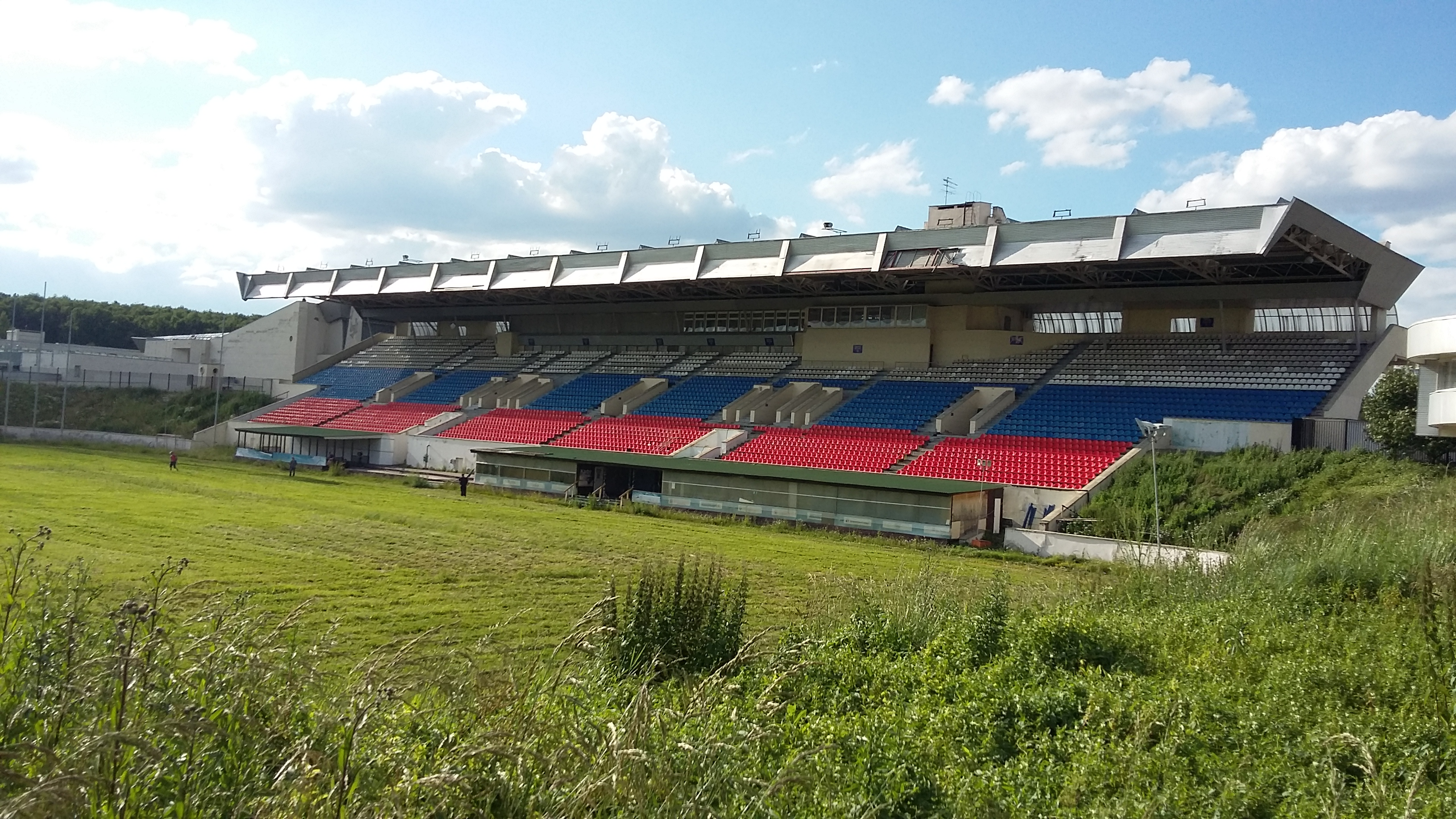
Show jumping stadium

The Bittsa Equestrian Complex of the Moscow City Sports Committee /ˈbiːtsə/, Russian: Конноспортивный комплекс "Битца" Москомспорта), former Trade Unions' Equestrian Complex, is an equestrian venue located near Bitsa Park in the South District of Moscow city, Russia. During the 1980 Summer Olympics, it hosted the riding and running portions of the modern pentathlon events and all of the equestrian events except individual jumping, which was held at the main venue, Grand Arena of the Central Lenin Stadium.

Its construction began in 1977 before the XXII Moscow Olympic Games. July 4, 1980 marks the official opening of the complex. The venue consisted of 45 ha (110 acres).
