= Poland at the 1980 Summer Olympics =

- IOC code: POL
- NOC: Polish Olympic Committee

in Moscow, Soviet Union July 19, 1980 – August 3, 1980
- Competitors: 306 (232 men and 74 women) in 21 sports
- Flag bearer: Czesław Kwieciński
- Medals Ranked 10th: Gold 3 Silver 14 Bronze 15 Total 32

Summer Olympics appearances (overview)
- 1924; 1928; 1932; 1936; 1948; 1952; 1956; 1960; 1964; 1968; 1972; 1976; 1980; 1984; 1988; 1992; 1996; 2000; 2004; 2008; 2012; 2016; 2020; 2024

Other related appearances
- Russian Empire (1900, 1912); Austria (1908–1912)

Poland competed at the 1980 Summer Olympics in Moscow, USSR. 306 competitors, 232 men and 74 women, took part in 162 events in 21 sports.

== Medalists ==
=== Gold ===
- Bronisław Malinowski — Athletics, Men's 3000 m Steeplechase
- Władysław Kozakiewicz — Athletics, Men's Pole Vault
- Jan Kowalczyk — Equestrian, Jumping Individual

=== Silver ===
- Leszek Dunecki, Zenon Licznerski, Marian Woronin, and Krzysztof Zwoliński — Athletics, Men's 4 × 100 m Relay
- Jacek Wszoła — Athletics, Men's High Jump
- Tadeusz Ślusarski — Athletics, Men's Pole Vault
- Urszula Kielan — Athletics, Women's High Jump
- Paweł Skrzecz — Boxing, Men's Light Heavyweight
- Czesław Lang — Cycling, Men's Individual Road Race
- Janusz Bobik, Wiesław Hartman, Jan Kowalczyk, and Marian Kozicki — Equestrian, Jumping Team
- Piotr Jablkowski, Andrzej Lis, Mariusz Strzalka, and Leszek Swornowski — Fencing, Men's Épée Team
- Małgorzata Dłużewska and Czesława Kościańska — Rowing, Women's Coxless Pairs
- Józef Lipień — Wrestling, Men's Greco-Roman Bantamweight
- Andrzej Supron — Wrestling, Men's Greco-Roman Lightweight
- Jan Dołgowicz — Wrestling, Men's Greco-Roman Middleweight
- Roman Bierła — Wrestling, Men's Greco-Roman Heavyweight
- Władysław Stecyk — Wrestling, Men's Freestyle Flyweight

=== Bronze ===
- Lucyna Langer — Athletics, Women's 100 m Hurdles
- Krzysztof Kosedowski — Boxing, Men's Featherweight
- Kazimierz Adach — Boxing, Men's Lightweight
- Kazimierz Szczerba — Boxing, Men's Welterweight
- Jerzy Rybicki — Boxing, Men's Middleweight
- Lech Koziejowski, Adam Robak, Marian Sypniewski, and Bogusław Zych — Fencing, Men's Foil Team
- Barbara Wysoczańska — Fencing, Women's Foil Individual
- Janusz Pawłowski — Judo, Men's Half Lightweight (65 kg)
- Ryszard Kubiak, Grzegorz Nowak, Ryszard Stadniuk, Grzegorz Stellak, and Adam Tomasiak — Rowing, Men's Coxed Fours
- Agnieszka Czopek — Swimming, Women's 400 m Individual Medley
- Tadeusz Dembończyk — Weightlifting, Men's Bantamweight
- Marek Seweryn — Weightlifting, Men's Featherweight
- Tadeusz Rutkowski — Weightlifting, Men's Super Heavyweight
- Aleksander Cichoń — Wrestling, Freestyle Light Heavyweight
- Adam Sandurski — Wrestling, Men's Freestyle Super Heavyweight

== Archery ==
Poland entered two women and one man in its third appearance in Olympic archery.

Men

Athlete	Event	Round 1		Round 2		Total score	
Athlete	Event	Score	Seed	Score	Seed	Score	Seed
Krzysztof Włosik	Individual	1178	19	1232	4	2410	10

Women

Athlete	Event	Round 1		Round 2		Total score	
Athlete	Event	Score	Seed	Score	Seed	Score	Seed
Maria Szeliga	Individual	1190	6	1175	8	2365	7
Jadwiga Wilejto	Individual	1165	11	1163	12	2328	11

== Athletics ==
Men
Track & road events

Athlete	Event	Heat		Quarterfinal		Semifinal		Final	
Athlete	Event	Result	Rank	Result	Rank	Result	Rank	Result	Rank
Bohdan Bułakowski	20 km walk	—N/a						1:28:36.3	7
Bohdan Bułakowski	50 km walk	—N/a						DNS	
Leszek Dunecki	100 m	10.42	2 Q	10.40	5	Did not advance			
Leszek Dunecki	200 m	21.30	2 Q	20.87	3 Q	20.82	3 Q	20.68	6
Zenon Licznerski	400 m	21.36	4 Q	21.22	5	DNS		Did not advance	
Bronisław Malinowski	3000 m steeplechase	8:29.8	1 Q	—N/a		8:21.2	1 Q	8:09.7	Gold medal
Bogusław Mamiński	3000 m steeplechase	8:24.0	3 Q	—N/a		8:18.8	3 Q	8:19.5	7
Ryszard Marczak	Marathon	—N/a						DNF	
Zbigniew Pierzynka	Marathon	—N/a						2:20:03	26
Jerzy Pietrzyk	400 m	47.18	5	Did not advance					
Jan Pusty	110 m hurdles	13.84	2 Q	—N/a		13.81	4	13.68	5
Stanisław Rola	50 km walk	—N/a				4:07:07		7	
Andrzej Sajkowski	Marathon	—N/a						DNF	
Andrzej Stępień	400 m	47.99	3 Q	46.31	5	DNS		Did not advance	
Ryszard Szparak	400 m hurdles	50.45	4 Q	—N/a		50.41	6	Did not advance	
Krzysztof Wesołowski	3000 m steeplechase	8:35.6	4 Q	—N/a		8:33.1	9	Did not advance	
Marian Woronin	100 m	10.35	2 Q	10.27	2 Q	10.43	4 Q	10.46	7
Marian Woronin	200 m	21.63	1 Q	20.97	2 Q	20.75	3 Q	20.81	7
Krzysztof Zwoliński	100 m	10.60	3 Q	10.54	7	Did not advance			
Mirosław Żerkowski	1500 m	3:39.2	5 Q	—N/a		3:48.2	9	Did not advance	
Krzysztof Zwoliński; Zenon Licznerski; Leszek Dunecki; Marian Woronin	4 × 100 m relay	38.83	2 Q	—N/a				38.33	Silver medal
Jan Pawłowicz; Jerzy Pietrzyk; Adam Starostka; Andrzej Stępień	4 × 400 m relay	3:05.8	4	—N/a				Did not advance	

Field events

Athlete	Event	Qualification		Final	
Athlete	Event	Distance	Position	Distance	Position
Dariusz Adamus	Javelin throw	76.82	15	Did not advance	
Ireneusz Golda	Hammer throw	70.88	9 q	73.74	8
Zdzisław Hoffmann	Triple jump	15.35	16	Did not advance	
Stanisław Jaskułka	Long jump	8.07	3 Q	8.13	5
Andrzej Klimaszewski	Long jump	7.76	14	Did not advance	
Mariusz Klimczyk	Pole vault	5.40	1 Q	5.55	10
Władysław Kozakiewicz	Pole vault	5.40	5 Q	5.78 WR	Gold medal
Tadeusz Ślusarski	Pole vault	5.40	2 Q	5.65	Silver medal
Janusz Trzepizur	High jump	2.21	11 Q	2.18	12
Jacek Wszoła	High jump	2.21	8 Q	2.31	Silver medal

Combined events – Decathlon

Athlete	Event	100 m	LJ	SP	HJ	400 m	100H	DT	PV	JT	1500 m	Final	Rank
Dariusz Ludwig	Result	11.35	7.51	13.22	2.08	50.55	15.38	45.82	4.80	58.38	4:29.70	7978	6
Dariusz Ludwig	Points	721	923	685	925	781	809	797	1005	741	591	7978	6
Janusz Szczerkowski	Result	11.22	7.38	14.06	2.00	49.64	14.57	44.74	4.90	45.22	4:44.90	7822	10
Janusz Szczerkowski	Points	752	897	732	857	821	896	777	1028	567	495	7822	10

Women
Track & road events

Athlete	Event	Heat		Quarterfinal		Semifinal		Final	
Athlete	Event	Result	Rank	Result	Rank	Result	Rank	Result	Rank
Grażyna Oliszewska	400 m	52.62	4 Q	52.36	15	Did not advance			
Zofia Bielczyk	100 m hurdles	13.21	3 Q	—N/a		13.09	8 Q	13.08	8
Irena Szewińska-Kirszenstein	400 m	52.57	3 Q	—N/a		53.13	16	Did not advance	
Grażyna Rabsztyn	100 m hurdles	12.72	1 Q	—N/a		12.64	1 Q	12.74	5
Anna Bukis	800 m	1:58.9	4 Q	—N/a		2:00.3	7	Did not advance	
Anna Bukis	1500 m	4:06.0	5	Did not advance					
Jolanta Januchta	800 m	1:59.7	2 Q	—N/a		1:58.9	3 Q	1:58.3	6
Elżbieta Skowrońska-Katolik	800 m	2:01.2	4 Q	—N/a		2:01.1	7	Did not advance	
Lucyna Langer	100 m hurdles	12.75	2 Q	—N/a		12.91	5 Q	12.65	Bronze medal
Elżbieta Stachurska	100 m	DSQ		Did not advance					
Elżbieta Stachurska	200 m	23.58	4 Q	23.11	7	Did not advance			
Małgorzata Dunecka	400 m	51.81	4 Q	—N/a		51.93	14	Did not advance	
Lucyna Langer; Elżbieta Stachurska; Zofia Bielczyk; Grażyna Rabsztyn	4 × 100 m relay	—N/a						44.49	7
Grażyna Oliszewska; Jolanta Januchta; Elżbieta Skowrońska-Katolik; Małgorzata Dunecka	4 × 400 m relay	3:29.7	2 Q	—N/a				3:27.9	6

Field events

Athlete	Event	Qualification		Final	
Athlete	Event	Distance	Position	Distance	Position
Barbara Baran-Wojnar	Long jump	6.44	12 q	6.33	11
Bernadetta Blechacz	Javelin throw	59.90	10 q	61.46	9
Danuta Bulkowska	High jump	1.85	14	Did not advance	
Urszula Kielan	High jump	1.88	1 Q	1.94	Silver medal
Elżbieta Krawczuk	High jump	1.85	13	Did not advance	
Anna Włodarczyk	Long jump	6.58	6 Q	6.95	4

Combined events – Pentathlon

Athlete	Event	100H	LJ	SP	HJ	1500 m	Final	Rank
Małgorzata Guzowska	Result	14.16	13.63	1.80	6.21	2:29.3	4326	12
Małgorzata Guzowska	Points	846	817	1031	952	680	4326	12

== Basketball ==
=== Group B ===
Qualified for the quarterfinals

Team	W	L	PF	PA	PD	Pts
Yugoslavia	3	0	328	249	+79	6
Spain	2	1	289	241	+48	5
Poland	1	2	256	297	−41	4
Senegal	0	3	196	282	−86	3

July 21

Poland	81–104	Spain

Olympiiski, Moscow

July 22

Yugoslavia	129–91	Poland

Olympiiski, Moscow

July 23

Senegal	64–84	Poland

Olympiiski, Moscow

=== Classification round ===
Results between Poland vs. Senegal, Australia vs. Sweden and Czechoslovakia vs. India were carried over from the preliminary round.

Team	W	L	PF	PA	PD	Pts	1st Tie
Poland	4	1	453	359	+94	9	1W–0L
Australia	4	1	417	381	+36	9	0W–1L
Czechoslovakia	3	2	474	377	+97	8	1W–0L
Sweden	3	2	375	341	+34	8	0W–1L
Senegal	1	4	345	396	−51	6	
India	0	5	329	539	−210	5	

July 25

Poland	113–67	India

CSCA Sports Palace, Moscow

July 26

Australia	74–101	Poland

CSCA Sports Palace, Moscow

July 27

Czechoslovakia	84–88	Poland

CSCA Sports Palace, Moscow

July 28

Sweden	70–67	Poland

CSCA Sports Palace, Moscow

== Boxing ==
Men

Athlete	Event	1 Round	2 Round	3 Round	Quarterfinals	Semifinals	Final	
Athlete	Event	Opposition Result	Opposition Result	Opposition Result	Opposition Result	Opposition Result	Opposition Result	Rank
Henryk Pielesiak	Light Flyweight	BYE	Li Byong-Uk (PRK); L 2-3	Did not advance				
Henryk Średnicki	Flyweight	BYE		Webby Mwangu (ZAM); W 5-0	Viktor Miroshnichenko (URS); L 0-5	Did not advance		
Ryszard Czerwinski	Bantamweight	BYE	Firmin Abissi (BEN); W KO-1	Dumitru Cipere (ROU); L 0-5	Did not advance			
Krzysztof Kosedowski	Featherweight	BYE	Gu Young-Jo (PRK); W 5-0	Dejan Marovic (YUG); W 4-1	Sidnei dal Rovere (BRA); W 5-0	Adolfo Horta (CUB); L WO	Did not advance	Bronze medal
Kazimierz Adach	Lightweight	—N/a	Bounphisith Songkhamphou (LAO); W KO-1	Omari Golaya (TAN); W 5-0	Florian Livadaru (ROU); W KO-1	Ángel Herrera (CUB); L 0-5	Did not advance	Bronze medal
Bogdan Gajda	Light Welterweight	—N/a	Shadrach Odhiambo (SWE); L 1-4	Did not advance				
Kazimierz Szczerba	Welterweight	—N/a	Miroslav Pavlov (TCH); W KO-1	Kebede Sahilu (ETH); W 5-0	Ionel Budusan (ROU); W KO-1	John Mugabi (UGA); L 2-3	Did not advance	Bronze medal
Zygmunt Gosiewski	Light Middleweight	—N/a	Armando Martínez (CUB); L 0-5	Did not advance				
Jerzy Rybicki	Middleweight	—N/a	BYE	Tarmo Uusivirta (FIN); W KO-1	Peter Odhiambo (UGA); W 5-0	Viktor Savchenko (URS); L INJ	Did not advance	Bronze medal
Pawel Skrzecz	Light Heavyweight	—N/a		Mohamed Bouchiche (ALG); W WO	Georgica Donici (ROU); W 4-1	Ricardo Rojas (CUB); W 3-2	Slobodan Kacar (YUG); L 1-4	Silver medal
Grzegorz Skrzecz	Heavyweight	—N/a		William Isangura (TAN); W KO-1	Teófilo Stevenson (CUB); L KO-3	Did not advance		

== Canoeing ==
=== Sprint ===
Men

Athlete	Event	Heats		Repechages		Semifinals		Final	
Athlete	Event	Time	Rank	Time	Rank	Time	Rank	Time	Rank
Marek Łbik	C-1 500 m	1:55.60	3 Q	—N/a		BYE		1:55.90	5
Marek Łbik	C-1 1000 m	4:13.34	5 q	—N/a		4:20.87	4	Did not advance	
Marek Wisła; Jerzy Dunajski	C-2 500 m	1:45.67	1 Q	—N/a		BYE		1:45.10	4
Marek Dopierała; Jan Pinczura	C-2 1000 m	3:58.77	6 q	—N/a		3:55.99	3 Q	3:53.01	6
Grzegorz Śledziewski	K-1 500 m	1:47.17	3 Q	BYE		1:47.31	4	Did not advance	
Waldemar Merk	K-1 1000 m	3:48.82	4 R	3:52.27	3 Q	3:58.35	5	Did not advance	
Waldemar Merk; Zdzisław Szubski	K-2 500 m	1:41.24	3 Q	BYE		1:37.45	3 Q	1:37.20	7
Krzysztof Lepianka; Andrzej Klimaszewski	K-2 1000 m	3:31.80	5 R	3:33.31	4	Did not advance			
Ryszard Oborski; Grzegorz Kołtan; Daniel Wełna; Grzegorz Śledziewski	K-4 1000 m	3:09.92	2 Q	—N/a		BYE		3:16.33	4

Women

Athlete	Event	Heats		Semifinals		Final	
Athlete	Event	Time	Rank	Time	Rank	Time	Rank
Ewa Kamińska-Eichler	K-1 500 m	1:59.75	1 Q	BYE		2:01.23	5
Ewa Kamińska-Eichler; Ewa Wojtaszek	K-2 500 m	1:52.14	3 Q	BYE		1:51.31	7

== Cycling ==
=== Road ===
Athlete	Event	Time	Rank
Jan Jankiewicz	Men's road race	DNF	
Czesław Lang	Men's road race	4:51:26.9	Silver medal
Krzysztof Sujka	Men's road race	4:57:38.9	22
Tadeusz Wojtas	Men's road race	4:56:12.9	5
Stefan Ciekański; Jan Jankiewicz; Czesław Lang; Witold Plutecki	Team time trial	2:04:13.8	4

=== Track ===
1000m time trial

Athlete	Event	Time	Rank
Andrzej Michalak	Men's 1000m time trial	1:07.891	11

Men's Sprint

Athlete	Event	Round 1	Repechage 1	Repechage Finals	Round 2	Repechage 2	Round 3	Repechage 3	Quarterfinals	Semifinals	Final	
Athlete	Event	Time Speed (km/h)	Rank	Opposition Time Speed (km/h)	Opposition Time Speed (km/h)	Opposition Time Speed (km/h)	Opposition Time Speed (km/h)	Opposition Time Speed (km/h)	Opposition Time Speed (km/h)	Opposition Time Speed (km/h)	Opposition Time Speed (km/h)	Rank
Benedykt Kocot	Men's sprint	BYE			Tucker (AUS); L	Veldt (NED); L	Did not advance					

Pursuit

Athlete	Event	Qualification		Round 1/8	Quarterfinals	Semifinals	Final	
Athlete	Event	Time	Rank	Opposition Time	Opposition Time	Opposition Time	Opposition Time	Rank
Zbigniew Woźnicki	Men's individual pursuit	4:53.53	12	Did not advance				
Marek Kulesza; Andrzej Michalak; Janusz Sałach; Zbigniew Woźnicki	Team pursuit	4:28.38	9	Did not advance				

== Diving ==
Men

Athlete	Event	Preliminaries		Final			
Athlete	Event	Points	Rank	Points	Rank	Total	Rank
Roman Godzinski	3 m springboard	462.48	19	Did not advance			

Women

Athlete	Event	Preliminaries		Final			
Athlete	Event	Points	Rank	Points	Rank	Total	Rank
Ewa Kucinska	10 m platform	308.88	13	Did not advance			

== Equestrian ==
=== Dressage ===
Athlete	Horse	Event	Qualification		Final		Overall	
Athlete	Horse	Event	Score	Rank	Score	Rank	Score	Rank
Elżbieta Morciniec	Sum	Individual	954	13	Did not advance			
Wanda Wąsowska	Damask	Individual	930	14	Did not advance			
Jozef Zagor	Helios	Individual	1061	11 Q	804	10	804	10
Elżbieta Morciniec; Wanda Wąsowska; Jozef Zagor	See above	Team	2945	4	—N/a		2945	4

=== Eventing ===
Athlete	Horse	Event	Dressage		Cross-country			Jumping			Total	
Athlete	Horse	Event	Dressage		Cross-country			Final			Total	
Athlete	Horse	Event	Penalties	Rank	Penalties	Total	Rank	Penalties	Total	Rank	Penalties	Rank
Mirosław Szłapka	Chutor	Individual	52.40	3	184.40	236.80	6	5.00	241.80	6	241.80	6
Jacek Wierzchowiecki	Bastion	Individual	43.00	1	368.80	411.80	14	0.00	411.80	13	411.80	13
Jacek Daniluk	Len	Individual	49.20	2	DQ	DNF		DNS			DNF	AC
Stanisław Jasiński	Hangar	Individual	55.80	10	DQ	DNF		DNS			DNF	AC
Mirosław Szłapka; Jacek Wierzchowiecki; Jacek Daniluk; Stanisław Jasiński	See above	Team	144.60	1	DNF		AC	DNF		AC	DNF	

=== Show jumping ===
Athlete	Horse	Event	Qualification		Final			
Athlete	Horse	Event	Penalties	Rank	Penalties	Rank	Penalties	Rank
Marian Kozicki	Bremen	Individual	12.00	7	12.50	10	24.50	8
Jan Kowalczyk	Artemor	Individual	4.00	1	4.00	1	8.00	Gold medal
Wiesław Hartman	Norton	Individual	4.00	1	12.00	8	16.00	6
Marian Kozicki; Jan Kowalczyk; Janusz Bobik; Wiesław Hartman	See above	Team	32,00	2	24,00	3	56,00	Silver medal

== Fencing ==
18 fencers, 13 men and 5 women, represented Poland in 1980.

=== Men ===
==== Individual ====
Athlete	Event	Group round I		Group round II		Elimination round I	Elimination round II	Repechage round I	Repechage round II	Repechage Final	Final	
Athlete	Event	Opposition Result	Rank	Opposition Result	Rank	Opposition Result	Opposition Result	Opposition Result	Opposition Result	Opposition Result	Opposition Result	Rank
Lech Koziejowski	Men's foil	Haertter (GDR); Harper (GBR); Betancourt Scull (CUB)	14 Q	Romankov (URS); Pietruszka (FRA); Harper (GBR); Ganeff (BEL); Demeny (HUN)	5 Q	Behrens (GDR)	Romankov (URS)	Did not advance	Kotzmann (GER)	Pietruszka (FRA)	Smirnov (URS); Jolyot (FRA); Romankov (URS); Ruziev (URS); Kuki (ROU)	5
Adam Robak	Men's foil	Smirnov (URS); Szelei (HUN); Hamou (ALG); Haddad (LIB)	5 Q	Ruziev (URS); Jolyot (FRA); Haertter (GDR); Cervi (ITA); Roca Carbonell (ESP)	2 Q	Ruziev (URS)	Did not advance	Haertter (GDR)	Szelei (HUN)	Did not advance		9
Bogusław Zych	Men's foil	Kuki (ROM); Behrens (GDR); Favier Sando (CUB); Al-Ahmed (KUW)	12 Q	Smirnov (URS); Szelei (HUN); Kotzmann (GER); Gonzalez Xiques (CUB); Flament (FRA)	16 Q	Smirnov (URS)	Did not advance	Pietruszka (FRA)	Did not advance			13

==== Team ====
Athlete	Event	Elimination round		Quarterfinal	Semifinal	Final	
Athlete	Event	Opposition Result	Rank	Opposition Result	Rank	Opposition Result	Rank
Piotr Jabłkowski; Andrzej Lis; Leszek Swornowski; Ludomir Chronowski; Mariusz Strzałka	Team épée	Cuba; W 12-4; Soviet Union; L 5-7	2 Q	Sweden; W 8-6	Romania; W 8-4	France; L 4-8	Silver medal
Adam Robak; Lech Koziejowski; Bogusław Zych; Marian Sypniewski	Team foil	Kuwait; W 15-1; East Germany; W 9-5	1 Q	Hungary; W 9-7	Soviet Union; L 7-9	East Germany; W 9-5	Bronze medal
Tadeusz Piguła; Leszek Jabłonowski; Jacek Bierkowski; Andrzej Kostrzewa; Marian Sypniewski	Team sabre	East Germany; W 9-7; Bulgaria; W 9-7	1 Q	Romania; W 9-7	Italy; L 5-10	Hungary; L 6-9	4

=== Women ===
==== Individual ====
Athlete	Event	Group round I		Group round II		Elimination round I	Elimination round II	Repasage round I	Repasage round II	Repasage Final	Final	
Athlete	Event	Opposition Result	Rank	Opposition Result	Rank	Opposition Result	Opposition Result	Opposition Result	Opposition Result	Opposition Result	Opposition Result	Rank
Barbara Wysoczanska	Women's foil	Belova (URS); 2:5; Ardeleanu (ROU); 5:4; Alfonso (CUB); 5:3; Borghs (BEL); 4:5	18 Q	Belova (URS); 5:0; Gaudin (FRA); 5:2; Janke (GDR); 5:0; Rodríguez (VEN); 5:3; Ferguson (AUS); 5:1	1 Q	Sidorova (URS)	Trinquet (FRA)	Did not advance			Trinquet (FRA); 5:1; Gaudin (HUN); 2:5; Stahl (ROU); 2:5; Gaudin (FRA); 5:3; Vaccaroni (ITA); 5:0	Bronze medal
Delfina Skąpska	Women's foil	Gaudin (FRA); 2:5; Gilyazova (URS); 5:3; Font (CUB); 5:4; Borghs (BEL); 5:3	7 Q	Gilyazova (URS); 2:5; Niklaus (GDR); 5:1; Brouquier (FRA); 5:2; Font (CUB); 5:2; Moldovan (ROU); 5:3	4 Q	Lokšová (TCH)	Did not advance	Brouquier (FRA)	Schwarczenberger (HUN)	Trinquet (FRA)	Did not advance	7
Jolanta Królikowska	Women's foil	Vaccaroni (ITA); 4:5; Lokšová (TCH); 4:5; Hertramf (GDR); 1:5; Schwarczenberger (HUN); 1:5; Smith (AUS); 5:2	30	Did not advance								30

==== Team ====
Athlete	Event	Elimination round		Quarterfinal	Semifinal	Final	
Athlete	Event	Opposition Result	Rank	Opposition Result	Rank	Opposition Result	Rank
Delfina Skąpska; Agnieszka Dubrawska; Jolanta Królikowska; Barbara Wysoczańska; Kamilla Składanowska	Team foil	Hungary; L 6-10; Great Britain; W 12-4	1 Q	Cuba; W 9-7	Soviet Union; L 3-9	Hungary; L 7-9	4

== Gymnastics ==
=== Artistic ===
Men

Athlete	Event	Qualification								Final							
Athlete	Event	Apparatus						Total	Rank	Apparatus						Total	Rank
Athlete	Event	F	PH	R	V	PB	HB	Total	Rank	F	PH	R	V	PB	HB	Total	Rank
Krzysztof Potaczek	All-around	17.70	18.55	16.80	18.70	18.45	17.85	108.05	63	Did not advance							
Andrzej Szajna	All-around	19.05	18.90	18.90	19.20	18.10	18.70	112.85	30 Q	9.250	9.600	9.750	9.850	9.550	9.800	114.225	17
Waldemar Woźniak	All-around	18.10	18.20	18.30	19.25	18.55	18.45	110.85	47 Q	9.100	8.950	9.750	9.850	8.900	9.600	111.575	29

Women

Athlete	Event	Qualification						Final					
Athlete	Event	Apparatus				Total	Rank	Apparatus				Total	Rank
Athlete	Event	F	V	UB	BB	Total	Rank	F	V	UB	BB	Total	Rank
Agata Jaroszek-Karczmarek	All-around	18.40	18.90	18.60	17.75	73.65	42	Did not advance					
Anita Jokiel	All-around	18.95	18.80	18.75	18.45	74.95	38 Q	9.30	8.85	9.45	9.75	74.825	18
Małgorzata Majza	All-around	19.15	18.70	18.90	18.45	75.20	37 Q	9.65	8.85	9.00	9.40	74.500	20
Łucja Matraszek-Chydzińska	All-around	19.00	19.05	19.15	18.95	76.15	32 Q	DNF			8.40	46.475	36
Katarzyna Snopko	All-around	18.75	18.70	18.35	17.65	73.45	44	Did not advance					
Wiesława Żelaskowska	All-around	18.95	18.50	18.10	18.75	74.30	41	Did not advance					
Agata Jaroszek-Karczmarek; Anita Jokiel; Małgorzata Majza; Łucja Matraszek-Chydzińska; Katarzyna Snopko; Wiesława Żelaskowska	Team all-around	94.80	94.35	93.95	93.05	376.15	7	—N/a					

== Handball ==
=== Preliminary round ===
12 teams played each other in two groups to decide for which place each of them will compete in the Final Round.

==== Group A ====
Rank	Team	Pld	W	D	L	GF	GA	Pts	(East Germany)	(Hungary)	Olympic flag for Spain	(Poland)	Olympic flag for Denmark	(Cuba)
1.	East Germany	5	4	1	0	108	92	9	X	14:14	21:17	22:21	24:20	27:20
2.	Hungary	5	3	2	0	96	88	8	14:14	X	20:17	20:20	16:15	26:22
3.	Spain	5	2	1	2	102	106	5	17:21	17:20	X	24:22	20:19	24:24
4.	Poland	5	2	1	2	123	97	5	21:22	20:20	22:24	X	26:12	34:19
5.	Denmark	5	1	0	4	96	104	2	20:24	15:16	19:20	12:26	X	30:18
6.	Cuba	5	0	1	4	103	141	1	20:27	22:26	24:24	19:34	18:30	X

20 July
18:30

Poland	20-20	Hungary

22 July
17:00

Poland	34-19	Cuba

24 July
18:30

Denmark	12-26	Poland

26 July
20:00

East Germany	22-21	Poland

28 July
18:30

Poland	22-24	Spain

=== Final Round ===
==== 7th place match ====
30 July
13:00

Poland	23-22	Switzerland

Team roster

Poland – 7th place

- Andrzej Kacki
- Zbigniew Gawlik
- Piotr Czaczka
- Marek Panas
- Jerzy Garpiel
- Jerzy Klempel
- Janusz Brzozowski
- Zbigniew Tłuczyński
- Grzegorz Kosma
- Mieczysław Wojczak
- Daniel Waszkiewcz
- Ryszard Jedliński
- Henryk Rozmiarek
- Alfred Kaluzinski

Head coach

== Hockey ==
Men's team competition

=== Preliminary round ===
Team	Pld	W	D	L	GF	GA	Pts
Spain	5	4	1	0	33	3	9
India	5	3	2	0	39	6	8
Soviet Union	5	3	0	2	30	11	6
Poland	5	2	1	2	19	15	5
Cuba	5	1	0	4	7	42	2
Tanzania	5	0	0	5	3	54	0

20 July

Poland	7 – 1	Cuba

21 July

Poland	2 – 2	India

23 July

Soviet Union	5 – 1	Poland

24 July

Poland	0 – 6	Spain

26 July

Tanzania	1 – 9	Poland

=== Third place match ===
26 July

Soviet Union	2 – 1	Poland

=== Team roster ===
Poland – 4th place

- Zygfryd Józefiak
- Andrzej Mikina
- Krystian Bak
- Włodzimierz Stanisławski
- Leszek Hensler
- Jan Sitek
- Jerzy Wybieralski
- Leszek Tórz
- Zbigniew Rachwalski
- Henryk Horwat
- Andrzej Mysliwiec
- Leszek Andrzejczak
- Jan Mielniczak
- Mariusz Kubiak
- Adam Dolatowski
- Krzysztof Glodowski

Head coach

Women's team competition

=== Preliminary Pool ===
Rk	Team	Pld	W	D	L	GF	GA	Pts
1st place, gold medalist(s)	Zimbabwe	5	3	2	0	13	4	8
2nd place, silver medalist(s)	Czechoslovakia	5	3	1	1	10	5	7
3rd place, bronze medalist(s)	Soviet Union	5	3	0	2	11	5	6
4	India	5	2	1	2	9	6	5
5	Austria	5	2	0	3	6	11	4
6	Poland	5	0	0	5	0	18	0

25 July

Poland	0 – 4	Zimbabwe

27 July

India	4 – 0	Poland

28 July

Austria	3 – 0	Poland

30 July

Soviet Union	6 – 0	Poland

31 July

Poland	0 – 1	Czechoslovakia

=== Team roster ===
Poland – 6th place

- Małgorzata Gajewska
- Bogumila Pajor
- Jolanta Sekulak
- Jolanta Bledowska
- Lucyna Matuszna
- Danuta Stanislawska
- Wiesława Ryłko
- Lidia Zgajewska
- Maria Kornek
- Małgorzata Lipska
- Halina Koldras
- Lucyna Siejka
- Dorota Bielska
- Dorota Zaleczna
- Michalina Plekaniec
- Jadwiga Koldras

Head coach

== Judo ==
Men

Athlete	Event	Round 1	Round 2	Round 3	Round 4	Repechage 1	Repechage 2	Final / BM	
Athlete	Event	Opposition Result	Opposition Result	Opposition Result	Opposition Result	Opposition Result	Opposition Result	Opposition Result	Rank
Marian Donat	−60kg	João Fernandes Vitor De Mendonça (POR); L 0000-0100	Did not advance						
Janusz Pawłowski	−65kg	Imre Gelencser (URS); W 0100-0000	Gerardo Padilla (MEX); W 0010-0000	Djibril Sambou (SEN); W 1000-0000	Tsendiin Damdin (MGL); L 0000-0010	BYE		Yves Delvingt (FRA); W 1000-0000	Bronze medal
Edward Alkśnin	−71kg	Anelson Guerra (URS); W 1000-0000	Halldór Gudbjornsson (ISL); W 1000-0000	Neil Adams (GBR); L 0000-1000	BYE		Michael Picken (AUS); W 0010-0000	Karl-Heinz Lehmann (GDR); L 0000-0001	5
Jarosław Brawata	−78kg	Berkane Lakhdar Adda (ALG); L 0001-1000	Did not advance						
Krzysztof Kurczyna	−86kg	Marcus Carew (AUS); W 0010-0000	Aleksandrs Jackevičs (URS); L 0000-0001	Did not advance					
Dariusz Nowakowski	−95kg	Tengiz Khubuluri (URS); L 0000-0100	BYE			Daniel Radu (ROU); L 0000-1000	Did not advance		9
Wojciech Reszko	+95kg	BYE	Angelo Parisi (FRA); L 0000–0010	BYE		Vladimír Kocman (TCH); L 0000-0001	Did not advance		7
Wojciech Reszko	Open	András Ozsvár (HUN); L 0000–0001	Did not advance						

== Modern pentathlon ==
Three male pentathletes represented Poland in 1980.

Athlete	Event	Shooting (10 m air pistol)	Fencing (épée one touch)	Swimming (200 m freestyle)	Riding (show jumping)	Running (3000 m)	Total points	Final rank
Athlete	Event	Points	Points	Points	Points	Points	Total points	Final rank
Marek Bajan	Men's	1100	844	890	1244	1069	5147	18
Jan Olesiński	Men's	1038	818	978	1160	1225	5219	11
Janusz Pyciak-Peciak	Men's	1070	844	978	1172	1204	5268	6
Marek Bajan; Jan Olesiński; Janusz Pyciak-Peciak	Team	3208	2506	2846	3576	3498	15634	4

== Rowing ==
Men

Athlete	Event	Heats		Repechage		Semifinal		Final	
Athlete	Event	Time	Rank	Time	Rank	Time	Rank	Time	Rank
Wiesław Kujda; Piotr Tobolski; Wiesław Piasćik	Double sculls	7:01.79	2 R	6:47.38	2 Q	—N/a		6:39.66	6
Andrzej Skowroński; Zbigniew Andruszkiewicz; Ryszard Burak; Stanisław Wierzbicki	Quadruple sculls	6:27.24	6 R	6:16.69	5 FB	—N/a		5:58.63	7
Mirosław Jarzembowski; Mariusz Trzciński; Henryk Trzciński; Marek Niedziałkowski	Coxless four	6:55.28	5 R	6:30.26	4 FB	—N/a		6:22.31	8
Grzegorz Stellak; Adam Tomasiak; Grzegorz Nowak; Ryszard Stadniuk; Ryszard Kubiak	Coxed four	6:47.61	2 R	6:32.28	1 Q	—N/a		6:22.52	Bronze medal
Paweł Borkowski; Wiesław Kujda; Grzegorz Stellak; Adam Tomasiak; Grzegorz Nowak; Mirosław Kowalewski; Ryszard Stadniuk; Władysław Beszterda; Ryszard Kubiak	Eight	6:00.43	3 R	5:47.35	3 FB	—N/a		DNS	

Women

Athlete	Event	Heats		Repechage		Final	
Athlete	Event	Time	Rank	Time	Rank	Time	Rank
Beata Dziadura	Single sculls	4:02.11	2 Q	3:49.06	3 Q	3:51.45	6
Hanna Jarkiewicz; Janina Klucznik	Double sculls	3:34.11	1 Q	BYE		3:27.25	5
Małgorzata Dłużewska; Czesława Kościańska	Coxless pair	3:56.08	1 Q	BYE		3:30.95	Silver medal
Bogusława Kozłowska-Tomasiak; Mariola Abrahamczyk; Maria Kobylińska; Aleksandra Kaczyńska; Maria Dzieża	Quadruple sculls	3:27.95	3 R	3:22.75	4 Q	3:20.95	5
Urszula Niebrzydowska; Ewa Lewandowska; Wanda Piątkowska; Beata Kamuda; Jolanta Modlińska; Teresa Soroka; Krystyna Ambros; Wiesława Kiełsznia; Grażyna Różańska	Eight	3:25.15	3 R	3:24.04	4	3:24.04	6

== Sailing ==
Open

Athlete	Event	Race							Net points	Final rank
Athlete	Event	1	2	3	4	5	6	7	Net points	Final rank
Ryszard Skarbinski	Finn	7	~~17~~	8	6	6	9	3	71.1	7
Leon Wróbel; Tomasz Stocki	470	1	9	7	4	1	11	~~12~~	53.0	5
Andrzej Iwinski; Ludwik Raczynski	Flying Dutchman	11	~~DSQ~~	7	10	9	11	12	96.0	11
Bogdan Kramer; Jarogniew Krüger	Tornado	9	9	9	9	~~10~~	8	9	89.0	9
Tomasz Holc; Zbigniew Malicki	Star	11	10	10	9	~~DNF~~	DNF	3	89.7	12
Jan Bartosik; Jerzy Wujecki; Zdzislaw Kotla	Soling	8	6	4	8	~~9~~	9	8	76.7	9

== Shooting ==
Open

Athlete	Event	Final	
Athlete	Event	Score	Rank
Wiesław Gawlikowski	Skeet	192	19
Jerzy Greszkiewicz	Running target	576	10
Eugeniusz Janczak	Running target	555	17
Piotr Kosmatko	50 metre rifle prone	596	10
Andrzej Macur	25 m rapid fire pistol	591	14
Ermin Matelski	50 m pistol	557	13
Hubert Pawłowski	Skeet	188	28
Eugeniusz Pędzisz	50 metre rifle three positions	1156	8
Sławomir Romanowski	50 m pistol	558	10
Romuald Siemionow	50 metre rifle three positions	1153	11
Krzysztof Stefaniak	50 metre rifle prone	598	4
Józef Zapędzki	25 m rapid fire pistol	591	14

== Swimming ==
Men

Athlete	Event	Heat		Semifinal		Final	
Athlete	Event	Time	Rank	Time	Rank	Time	Rank
Leszek Górski	400 metre medley	4:26.02	2 Q	—N/a		4:28.89	7
Zbigniew Januszkiewicz	200 metre backstroke	2:08.11	7	—N/a		Did not advance	
Dariusz Wolny	400 metre medley	4:31.28	4	Did not advance			
Bogusław Zychowicz	100 metre butterfly	57.21	4 Q	57.43	8	Did not advance	
Bogusław Zychowicz	200 metre butterfly	2:04.33	3	—N/a		Did not advance	

Women

Athlete	Event	Heat		Semifinal		Final	
Athlete	Event	Time	Rank	Time	Rank	Time	Rank
Magdalena Białas	200 metre backstroke	2:26.85	8	—N/a		Did not advance	
Magdalena Białas	400 metre medley	4:51.59	3 Q	—N/a		4:53.30	8
Dorota Brzozowska	100 metre butterfly	1:04.04	4	—N/a		Did not advance	
Dorota Brzozowska	200 metre butterfly	2:14.74	2 Q	—N/a		2:14.12	5
Agnieszka Czopek	200 metre backstroke	2:23.06		—N/a		Did not advance	
Agnieszka Czopek	400 metre medley	4:49.04	2 Q	—N/a		4:48.17	Bronze medal
Malgorzata Rózycka	200 metre butterfly	2:19.70	6	—N/a		Did not advance	

== Volleyball ==
=== Preliminary round ===
Pool B

Pos	Team	Pld	W	L	Pts	SW	SL	SR	SPW	SPL	SPR	Qualification
1	Poland	4	3	1	7	11	5	2.200	221	172	1.285	Semifinals
2	Romania	4	3	1	7	10	5	2.000	215	138	1.558	Semifinals
3	Brazil	4	2	2	6	9	8	1.125	215	196	1.097	5th–8th semifinals
4	Yugoslavia	4	2	2	6	8	8	1.000	189	177	1.068	5th–8th semifinals
5	Libya	4	0	4	4	0	12	0.000	23	180	0.128	9th place match

Date	Venue		Score		Set 1	Set 2	Set 3	Set 4	Set 5	Total
20 Jul	MAC	Poland	3–1	Yugoslavia	15–11	11–15	15–3	15–7		56–36
22 Jul	MAC	Poland	3–1	Romania	9–15	15–12	15–13	15–13		54–53
24 Jul	DMA	Poland	3–0	Libya	15–1	15–3	15–1			45–5
28 Jul	DMA	Brazil	3–2	Poland	13–15	18–20	17–15	15–11	15–5	78–66

=== 1st–4th places ===
Semifinals
30 July
Soviet Union	3
Romania	0
30 July
Bulgaria	3
Poland	0

Gold medal match
1 August
Soviet Union	3
Bulgaria	1
Bronze medal match
1 August
Romania	3
Poland	1

==== Semifinals ====
Date	Venue		Score		Set 1	Set 2	Set 3	Set 4	Set 5	Total
30 Jul	MAC	Bulgaria	3–0	Poland	15–13	15–13	15–7			45–33
30 Jul	MAC	Soviet Union	3–0	Romania	15–6	15–10	15–5			45–21

==== Bronze medal match ====
Date	Venue		Score		Set 1	Set 2	Set 3	Set 4	Set 5	Total
01 Aug	MAC	Romania	3–1	Poland	15–10	9–15	15–13	15–9		54–47

=== Team roster ===
Poland – 4th place

- Robert Malinowski
- Maciej Jarosz
- Wiesław Czaja
- Lech Lasko
- Tomasz Wójtowicz
- Wiesław Gawłowski
- Wojciech Drzyzga
- Bogusław Kanicki
- Ryszard Bosek
- Włodzimierz Nalazek
- Leszek Molenda
- Władysław Kustra

Head coach

== Weightlifting ==
Men

Athlete	Event	Snatch		Clean & Jerk		Total	Rank
Athlete	Event	Result	Rank	Result	Rank	Total	Rank
Stefan Leletko	52 kg	105	6	135	2	240	5
Tadeusz Dembończyk	56 kg	120	2	145	5	265	Bronze medal
Marek Seweryn	60 kg	127.5	3	155	3	282.5	Bronze medal
Antoni Pawlak	60 kg	120	7	155	4	275	4
Zbigniew Kaczmarek	67.5 kg	140	8	177.5	5	317.5	6
Jan Lisowski	82.5 kg	150	7	205	2	355	4
Paweł Rabczewski	82.5 kg	155	5	195	6	350	6
Witold Walo	90 kg	160	5	200	3	360	5
Tadeusz Rutkowski	+110 kg	180	4	227.5	2	407.5	Bronze medal
Robert Skolimowski	+110 kg	175	7	210	7	385	7

== Wrestling ==
Men's freestyle

Athlete	Event	Elimination Pool						Final round	
Athlete	Event	Round 1 Result	Round 2 Result	Round 3 Result	Round 4 Result	Round 5 Result	Round 6 Result	Final round Result	Rank
Jan Falandys	−48 kg	Claudio Pollio (ITA); L 4-8	Mohammad Aktar (AFG); W 23-0	Gheorghe Raşovan (ROU); W T 1:47	Mahabir Singh (IND); W 14-5	Jang Se-Hong (PRK); L 8-13	—N/a	Did not advance	4
Władysław Stecyk	−52 kg	Petru Ciarnău (ROU); W DQ 8:08	Luis Ocaña (CUB); W 20-3	Ashok Kumar (IND); W 17-3	BYE	Lajos Szabó (HUN); W DQ 8:13	Anatoli Beloglazov (URS); L T 0:57	Nermedin Selimov (BUL); W 6-5	Silver medal
Wiesław Kończak	−57 kg	Amrik Singh Gill (GBR); W 24-3	Cris Brown (AUS); W 33-1	Li Ho-Pyong (PRK); L 5-9	Sergei Beloglazov (URS); L T 3:23	—N/a		Did not advance	6
Jan Szymański	−62 kg	Miho Dukov (BUL); L T 5:27	Adnan Kudmani (SYR); W T 2:18	Raúl Cascaret (CUB); L T 8:58	—N/a			Did not advance	9
Stanisław Chiliński	−68 kg	Saipulla Absaidov (URS); L T 5:34	Said Admane (ALG); W T 7:16	Eberhard Probst (GDR); L T 7:14	—N/a			Did not advance	12
Ryszard Ścigalski	−74 kg	Ibrahim Juma (IRQ); W T 2:45	Isaie Tonye (CMR); W T 1:58	Pavel Pinigin (URS); L T 7:11	István Fehér (HUN); W DQ 6:48	Valentin Raychev (BUL); L 4-9	—N/a	Did not advance	5
Henryk Mazur	−82 kg	Ahmadjan Khashan (AFG); W DQ 7:59	Sören Claeson (SWE); W 11-5	Mohammad El-Oulabi (SYR); W 15-6	Magomedkhan Aratsilov (URS); L T 5:49	István Kovács (HUN); L 4-7	—N/a	Did not advance	4
Aleksander Cichoń	−90 kg	Amadou Diop (SEN); W T 3:58	Jean-Claude Biloa (CMR); W T 2:56	Mick Pikos (AUS); W DQ 7:56	Christophe Andanson (FRA); W 12-1	BYE	Sanasar Oganisyan (URS); L 3-12	Uwe Neupert (GDR); L 2-6	Bronze medal
Tomasz Busse	−100 kg	BYE	Satpal Singh (IND); W 18-3	Július Strnisko (TCH); W 10-6	Harald Büttner (GDR); L 4-4*	Ilya Mate (URS); L 2-9	—N/a	Did not advance	5
Adam Sandurski	+100 kg	Arturo Díaz (CUB); W T 1:15	Mathew Clempner (GBR); W T 1:28	Miguel Zambrano (PER); W T 2:06	Andrei Ianko (ROU); W T 5:01	Soslan Andiyev (URS); L 3-6	BYE	József Balla (HUN); L 4-4*	Bronze medal

Men's Greco-Roman

Athlete	Event	Elimination Pool						Final round	
Athlete	Event	Round 1 Result	Round 2 Result	Round 3 Result	Round 4 Result	Round 5 Result	Round 6 Result	Final round Result	Rank
Roman Kierpacz	−48kg	Ferenc Seres (HUN); L T 1:32	Zhaksylyk Ushkempirov (URS); L 10-13	—N/a				Did not advance	8
Stanisław Wróblewski	−52kg	Nicu Gingă (ROU); L 6-7	Abdulnasser El-Oulabi (SYR); W 19-6	Lajos Rácz (HUN); L DQ 7:30	—N/a			Did not advance	6
Józef Lipień	−57kg	Josef Krysta (TCH); W 11-5	Georgi Donev (BUL); W T 7:17	BYE	Gyula Molnár (HUN); W 10-4	Mihai Boţilă (ROU); W D 8:37	Benni Ljungbeck (SWE); W D 8:25	Shamil Serikov (URS); L 4-11	Silver medal
Kazimierz Lipień	−62kg	Stelios Mygiakis (GRE); L 2-4	Lars Malmkvist (SWE); W DQ 5:29	Panaiot Kirov (BUL); L 3-5	—N/a			Did not advance	6
Andrzej Supron	−68kg	Sakhidad Hamidi (AFG); W DQ 5:28	Károly Gaál (HUN); W DQ 8:27	Buyandelgeriin Bold (MGL); W T 7:10	Suren Nalbandyan (URS); W 4-2	BYE	Lars-Erik Skiöld (SWE); W T 3:08	Ștefan Rusu (ROU); L 2-3	Silver medal
Wiesław Dziadura	−74kg	Anatoly Bykov (URS); L 5-6	Gheorghe Minea (ROU); W 4-3	Mikko Huhtala (FIN); W 3-7	—N/a			Did not advance	9
Jan Dołgowicz	−82kg	Ion Draica (ROU); W D 7:06	Jarmo Övermark (FIN); W T 2:17	Mohammad El-Oulabi (SYR); W DQ 5:34	Gennadi Korban (URS); L 4-11	BYE	—N/a	Pavel Pavlov (BUL); W T 1:28	Silver medal
'Czesław Kwieciński	−90kg	Jamtsyn Bor (MGL); W 11-3	Frank Andersson (SWE); L 0-19	Igor Kanygin (URS); L 2-10	—N/a			Did not advance	11
Roman Bierła	−100kg	Svend Studsgaard (DEN); W DQ 5:58	Georgios Pikilidis (GRE); W DQ 5:27	Vasile Andrei (ROU); W DQ 7:24	Refik Memišević (YUG); W 5-2	BYE	—N/a	Georgi Raikov (BUL); L D 7:52	Silver medal
Marek Galiński	+100kg	Arturo Díaz (CUB); L D 7:02	Roman Codreanu (ROU); L DQ 4:46	—N/a				Did not advance	8
