= Field hockey at the 1980 Summer Olympics – Women's team squads =

List of hockey players

The following is the list of squads that took place in the women's field hockey tournament at the 1980 Summer Olympics.

== Austria ==
The following players represented Austria:

- Patricia Lorenz
- Sabine Blemenschütz
- Elisabeth Pistauer
- Andrea Kozma
- Brigitta Pecanka
- Brigitte Kindler
- Friederike Stern
- Regina Lorenz
- Eleonore Pecanka
- Ilse Stipanovsky
- Andrea Porsch
- Erika Csar
- Dorit Ganster
- Eva Cambal

== Czechoslovakia ==
The following players represented Czechoslovakia:

- Jarmila Králíčková
- Berta Hrubá
- Iveta Šranková
- Lenka Vymazalová
- Jiřina Křížová
- Jiřina Kadlecová
- Jiřina Čermáková
- Marta Urbanová
- Květa Petříčková
- Marie Sýkorová
- Ida Hubáčková
- Milada Blažková
- Jana Lahodová
- Alena Kyselicová
- Jiřina Hájková
- Viera Podhányiová

== India ==
The following players represented India:

- Margaret Toscano
- Sudha Chaudhry
- Gangotri Bhandari
- Rekha Mundphan
- Rupa Kumari Saini
- Varsha Soni
- Eliza Nelson
- Prema Maya Sonir
- Nazleen Madraswalla
- Selma D'Silva
- Lorraine Fernandes
- Harpreet Gill
- Balwinder Kaur Bhatia
- Nisha Sharma

== Poland ==
The following players represented Poland:

- Małgorzata Gajewska
- Bogumiła Pajor
- Jolanta Sekulak
- Jolanta Błędowska
- Lucyna Matuszna
- Danuta Stanisławska
- Wiesława Ryłko
- Lidia Zgajewska
- Maria Kornek
- Małgorzata Lipska
- Halina Kołdras
- Lucyna Siejka
- Dorota Bielska
- Dorota Załęczna
- Michalina Plekaniec
- Jadwiga Kołdras

== Soviet Union ==
The following players represented the Soviet Union:

- Galina Inzhuvatova
- Nelli Gorbyatkova
- Valentina Zazdravnykh
- Nadezhda Ovechkina
- Natella Krasnikova
- Natalia Bykova
- Lidiya Glubokova
- Galina Vyuzhanina
- Natalia Buzunova
- Leyla Akhmerova
- Nadezhda Filippova
- Yelena Guryeva
- Tatyana Yembakhtova
- Tatyana Shvyganova
- Alina Kham
- Lyudmila Frolova

== Zimbabwe ==
The following players represented Zimbabwe:

- Sarah English
- Ann Grant
- Brenda Phillips
- Patricia McKillop
- Sonia Robertson
- Patricia Davies
- Maureen George
- Linda Watson
- Susan Huggett
- Gillian Cowley
- Liz Chase
- Sandra Chick
- Helen Volk
- Christine Prinsloo
- Anthea Stewart
