= Wiesława =

Wiesława is a Polish feminine given name, the feminine form of Wiesław, which means "great glory". Notable people with the given name include:

- Wiesława Kiełsznia (born 1961), Polish rower;
- Wiesława Kwaśniewska (born 1933), Polish actress;
- Wiesława Lech (born 1946), Polish gymnast;
- Wiesława Martyka (born 1949), Polish luger;
- Wiesława Mazurkiewicz (1926–2021), Polish actress;
- Wiesława Nizioł (fl. 1984–present), Polish mathematician and researcher;
- Wiesława Noskiewicz (1911–1991), Polish gymnast;
- Wiesława Ryłko (born 1957), Polish field hockey player;
- Wiesława Żelaskowska (born 1964), Polish gymnast.
