= Gymnastics at the 1980 Summer Olympics – Women's artistic individual all-around =

Women's artistic individual all-around at the Games of the XXII Olympiad
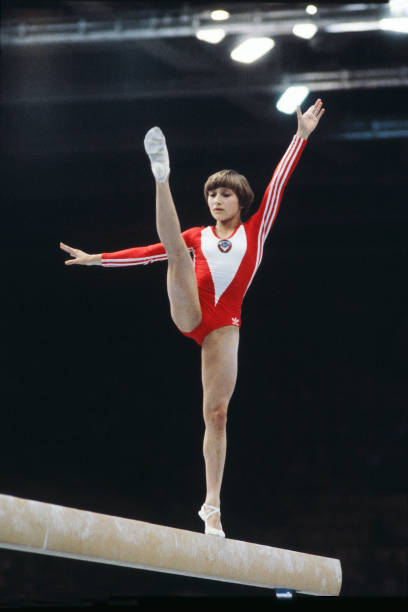
- Gold medalist Yelena Davydova (1980)
- Venue: Palace of Sports
- Date: 21–24 July 1980
- Competitors: 62 from 16 nations
- Winning total: 79.150

Medalists
1st place, gold medalist(s)		Elena Davydova	Soviet Union
2nd place, silver medalist(s)		Nadia Comăneci	Romania
2nd place, silver medalist(s)		Maxi Gnauck	East Germany

These are the results of the women's individual all-around competition, one of six events for female competitors in artistic gymnastics at the 1980 Summer Olympics in Moscow, USSR. The qualification and final rounds took place on July 21, 23 and 24 at the Sports Palace of the Central Lenin Stadium.

== Results ==
=== Qualification ===
Sixty-two gymnasts competed in the compulsory and optional rounds on July 21 and 23. The thirty-six highest scoring gymnasts advanced to the final on July 24. Each country was limited to three competitors in the final. Half of the points earned by each gymnast during both the compulsory and optional rounds carried over to the final. This constitutes each gymnast's "prelim" score. (When Nadia Comaneci performed on the beam, her final piece of apparatus, the judges took half an hour to judge her score).

=== Final ===
Rank	Gymnast	Prelim	Vault (gymnastics)	Uneven bars	Balance beam	Floor (gymnastics)	Final	Total
Gold medal	Elena Davydova (URS)	39.500	9.900	9.950	9.850	9.950	39.650	79.150
Silver medal	Maxi Gnauck (GDR)	39.675	9.700	9.950	9.800	9.950	39.400	79.075
Silver medal	Nadia Comăneci (ROU)	39.525	9.750	10.000	9.850	9.950	39.550	79.075
4	Natalia Shaposhnikova (URS)	39.575	9.900	9.900	9.900	9.750	39.450	79.025
5	Nellie Kim (URS)	39.475	9.700	9.850	9.950	9.450	38.950	78.425
6	Emilia Eberle (ROU)	39.550	9.600	9.900	9.400	9.950	38.850	78.400
7	Rodica Dunca (ROU)	39.250	9.750	9.600	9.900	9.850	39.100	78.350
8	Steffi Kräker (GDR)	39.250	9.800	9.900	9.400	9.850	38.950	78.200
9	Katharina Rensch (GDR)	39.275	9.700	9.800	9.750	9.600	38.850	78.125
10	Radka Zemanová (TCH)	39.100	9.550	9.750	9.750	9.800	38.850	77.850
11	Jana Labáková (TCH)	38.925	9.700	9.850	9.350	9.850	38.750	77.675
12	Eva Marečková (TCH)	39.025	9.700	9.200	9.750	9.700	38.350	77.375
13	Erika Flander (HUN)	38.600	9.650	9.600	9.300	9.850	38.400	77.000
14	Márta Egervári (HUN)	38.250	9.700	9.800	9.550	9.650	38.700	76.950
15	Silviya Topalova (BUL)	38.600	9.450	9.750	9.800	9.300	38.300	76.900
16	Krasimira Toneva (BUL)	38.125	9.800	9.600	9.350	9.750	38.500	76.625
17	Erika Csányi (HUN)	37.750	9.700	9.750	8.600	9.800	37.850	76.600
18	Anita Jokiel (POL)	37.475	8.850	9.450	9.750	9.300	37.350	74.825
19	Choe Jong-sil (PRK)	37.425	9.300	9.350	9.200	9.500	37.350	74.775
20	Małgorzata Majza (POL)	37.600	8.850	9.000	9.400	9.650	36.900	74.500
21	Galina Marinova (BUL)	38.250	9.550	8.500	8.550	9.350	35.950	74.200
22	Irene Martínez (ESP)	36.750	9.150	9.350	9.050	9.550	37.10	73.850
23	Denise Jones (GBR)	36.425	9.050	8.850	8.900	9.150	35.950	72.375
24	Sin Myong-ok (PRK)	36.250	8.850	8.500	9.400	9.300	36.050	72.300
25	Aurora Morata (ESP)	35.975	9.000	9.200	9.350	8.450	36.000	71.975
26	Davaasürengiin Oyuuntuyaa (MGL)	35.400	8.750	8.600	9.400	8.900	35.650	71.050
27	Suzanne Dando (GBR)	36.025	8.950	8.450	8.650	8.700	34.750	70.775
28	Susan Cheesebrough (GBR)	35.575	8.650	9.000	8.750	8.750	35.150	70.725
29	Estela de la Torre (MEX)	35.625	8.700	9.000	8.750	8.600	35.050	70.675
30	Lena Adomat (SWE)	35.200	8.900	9.100	8.200	8.650	34.85	70.050
31	Cláudia Costa (BRA)	35.275	8.800	8.200	8.850	8.650	34.500	69.775
32	Marina Sulicich (AUS)	35.800	8.700	8.750	7.550	8.900	33.900	69.700
33	Kerry Bayliss (AUS)	35.275	8.500	8.150	8.950	8.600	34.200	69.475
34	Kang Myong-suk (PRK)	36.175	8.250	8.950	7.300	8.600	33.100	69.275
35	Dashzevgiin Ariunaa (MGL)	34.700	8.550	8.550	8.550	8.250	33.850	68.550
36	Lucja Matraszek (POL)	38.075	0.000	8.400	0.000	0.000	8.400	46.475
