= Hubert Jedin =

German Catholic priest and historian

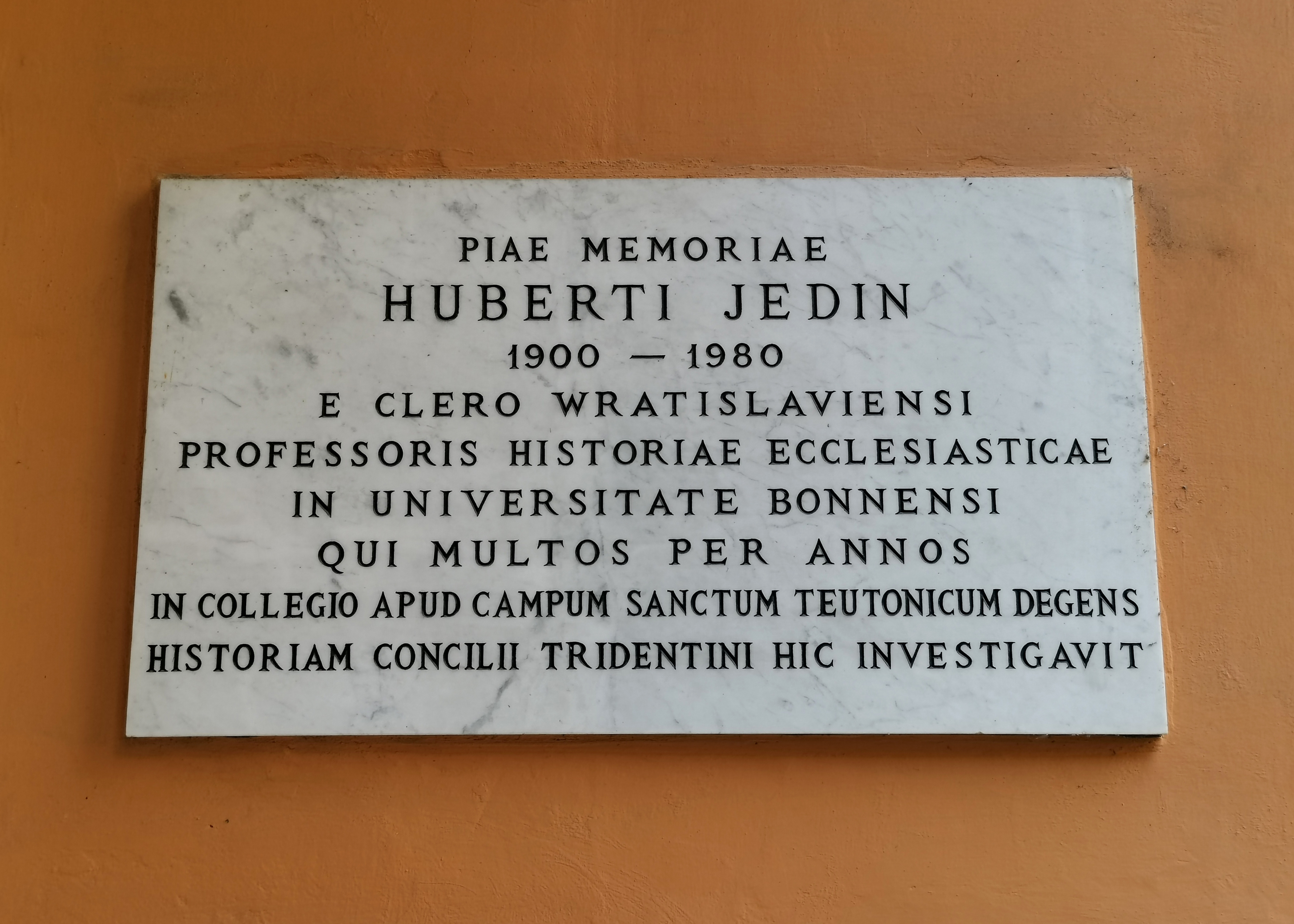
The commemorative plaque, in Latin, of Hubert Jedin at the Teutonic Cemetery in Rome.

Hubert Jedin (17 June 1900, in Groß Briesen, Friedewalde, Silesia – 16 July 1980, in Bonn) was a German Catholic priest and historian, whose publications specialized on the history of the Church.

His research focused on the history of the ecumenical councils in general and the Council of Trent in particular. In 1948 he accepted a professorship at the University of Bonn.

== Biography ==
He was born in Upper Silesia as one of ten children and studied theology in Breslau, Munich and Freiburg. He was ordained in 1924. In 1927 he went to Rome where he completed a biography of Girolamo Seripando. He returned to Germany in 1930, to teach Church History at the Catholic faculty of the University of Breslau.

Because of his Jewish mother, he was defined half-Jewish by the National Socialists. They stripped him of all academic titles and prohibited him from working in public institutions in Germany. Jedin returned to Rome and worked there for the Görres Society. From 1936 until 1939, he worked for his diocese in Breslau. He returned to Rome after narrowly escaping deportation to the Concentration Camp at Buchenwald.

=== History of the Council of Trent ===
In Rome, he lived at the Campo Santo Teutonico in the Vatican and was thus under the protection of Pope Pius XII during the German occupation. He worked on a history of the Council of Trent, which he published in the years 1951–1976. Jedin created the most comprehensive description of the Council in his History of the Council of Trent (Geschichte des Konzils von Trient) with about 2400 pages in four volumes.

=== Vatican II ===
After the war he was rehabilitated in Germany and accepted a professorship at the University of Bonn in 1948. Pope John XXIII nominated him to assist in the preparation of the Second Vatican Council in 1960. He continued to work for the council until it ended in 1965.

== Publications ==
His work includes over seven-hundred titles, including forty books and 250 articles in journals. Jedin issued numerous publications on the council of Trent, which, in his view, determined the relation of Catholics and Protestants for centuries.

He addressed issues of controversy, trying to give interpretations of ecumenical perspectives at that time. In addition, he oversaw the publication of a seven-volume Church History (1963-1979), an Atlas of Church History (1979), and the fundamental Lexikon für Theologie und Kirche (1957-1975, Encyclopedia for Theology and the Church). As a historian, he leaned on historicism as a method. As a theologian, he was an enlightened conservative, critical of some of the implementations of Vatican Two.
