= Makowice =

Makowice may refer to the following places in Poland:

- Makowice, Lower Silesian Voivodeship (south-west Poland)
- Makowice, Opole Voivodeship (south-west Poland)
- Makowice, West Pomeranian Voivodeship (north-west Poland)
