= Saini Sisters =

Saini Sisters is a popular epithet used for four sisters from Punjab who were international field hockey players, Rupa Saini, Krishna Saini, Swarna Saini and Prema Saini. At one time Saini sisters dominated woman's hockey in India and in the test series against Japan in 1970 all three sisters played together for India.

Rupa Saini had a particularly successful career. She donned the Indian colours in the 1974 France and 1978 Madrid World Cups and captained India in the latter playing as the centre-half. Saini earned nearly 200 Test caps both in India and abroad, and also played in the 1979 world championships held in Vancouver. She also went on to win the prestigious Arjuna Award . During the 1980 Olympics the sisters were star members of India's hockey team which also included the Prem Maya Sonir and Lorraine Fernandes where they defeated Austria and Poland. The team cane fourth missing out on a bronze medal.

Prema Saini, Rupa's elder sibling, was decorated with Maharaja Ranjit Singh Award by the Punjab government.

Rupa Saini later went on earn a doctoral degree and was employed as a senior lecturer with the Government College of Physical Education in Patiala. She later went on to become principal, Govt. Mohindra college, Patiala. She has also been in the past appointed as a manager of the senior Indian team by the Indian Women Hockey Federation (IWHF).

== See also ==
- Baljit Singh Saini
- Kulbir Bhaura
- Balwant (Bal) Singh Saini
