= Zagdbazaryn Davaanyam =

Mongolian gymnast (born 1944)

- Загдбазарын Давааням
- Born: 15 December 1944 (age 81) Ulaanbaatar, Mongolian People's Republic
- Height: 1.66 m (5 ft 5 in)

Gymnastics career
- Discipline: Men's artistic gymnastics
- Country represented: Mongolia

Zagdbazaryn Davaanyam (Mongolian: Загдбазарын Давааням; born 15 December 1944) is a Mongolian former gymnast and coach. He competed at the 1964 Summer Olympics and the 1968 Summer Olympics.

After his career, Davaanyam became a coach. He is a recipient of the title of Master of Sports and served as the head coach of the women's national team. Among notable gymnasts he coached were Olympian Davaasürengiin Oyuuntuyaa.
