= Siejka =

Siejka is a surname. Notable people with the surname include:

- Harry Siejka (born 1992), Australian rugby league footballer
- Jo Siejka (born 1980), Australian politician
- Lucyna Siejka (born 1962), Polish field hockey player
