= Sidzina, Opole Voivodeship =

Sidzina
- Village
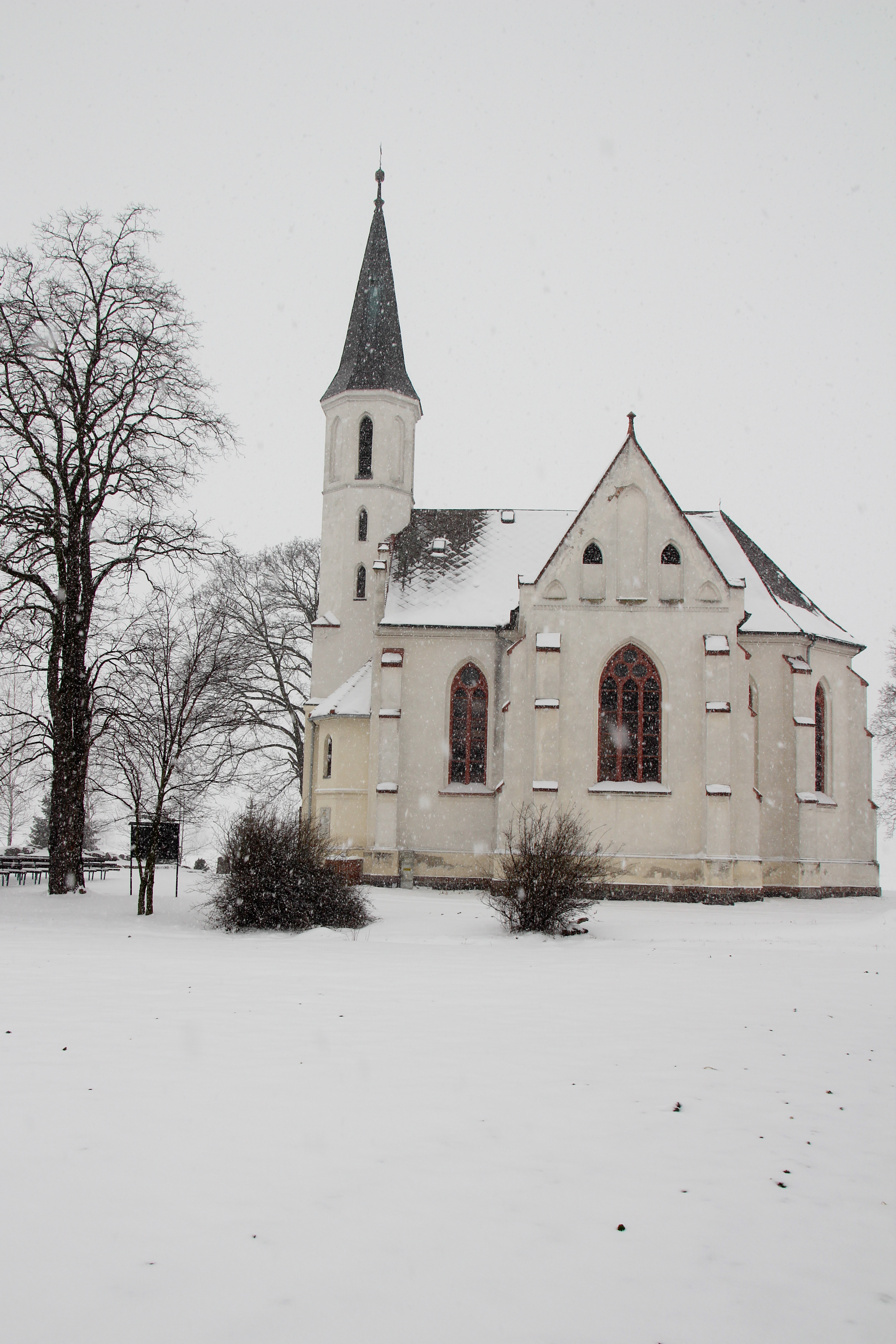
- Saints Peter and Paul Church

- Location within Poland
- Coordinates: 50°34′N 17°28′E
- Country: Poland
- Voivodeship: Opole
- County: Nysa
- Gmina: Skoroszyce

Sidzina [ɕiˈd͡ʑina] (German: Hennersdorf) is a village in the administrative district of Gmina Skoroszyce, within Nysa County, Opole Voivodeship, in south-western Poland.
