= Giełczyce =

- Village
- Location within Poland
- Coordinates: 50°35′N 17°26′E
- Country: Poland
- Voivodeship: Opole
- County: Nysa
- Gmina: Skoroszyce

Giełczyce [ɡʲɛu̯ˈt͡ʂɨt͡sɛ] (German: Geltendorf) is a village in the administrative district of Gmina Skoroszyce, within Nysa County, Opole Voivodeship, in south-western Poland.
