= Gmina Skoroszyce =

Gmina Skoroszyce Skoroszyce Commune
- Gmina
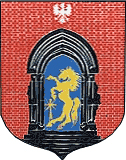
- Coat of arms
- Interactive map of Gmina Skoroszyce
- Coordinates (Skoroszyce): 50°35′51″N 17°23′3″E
- Country: Poland
- Voivodeship: Opole
- County: Nysa
- Seat: Skoroszyce

Area
  - Total: 103.61 km^{2} (40.00 sq mi)

Population (2019-06-30)
  - Total: 6,219
  - Density: 60.02/km^{2} (155.5/sq mi)
- Website: http://www.skoroszyce.pl

Gmina Skoroszyce is a rural gmina (administrative district) in Nysa County, Opole Voivodeship, in south-western Poland. Its seat is the village of Skoroszyce, which lies approximately 15 kilometres (9 mi) north of Nysa and 40 km (25 mi) west of the regional capital Opole.

The gmina covers an area of 103.61 square kilometres (40.0 sq mi), and as of 2019 its total population is 6,219.

== Villages ==
Gmina Skoroszyce contains the villages and settlements of Brzeziny, Chróścina, Czarnolas, Giełczyce, Makowice, Mroczkowa, Pniewie, Sidzina, Skoroszyce and Stary Grodków.

== Neighbouring gminas ==
Gmina Skoroszyce is bordered by the gminas of Grodków, Łambinowice, Niemodlin and Pakosławice.
