= Czarnolas, Opole Voivodeship =

Czarnolas
- Village
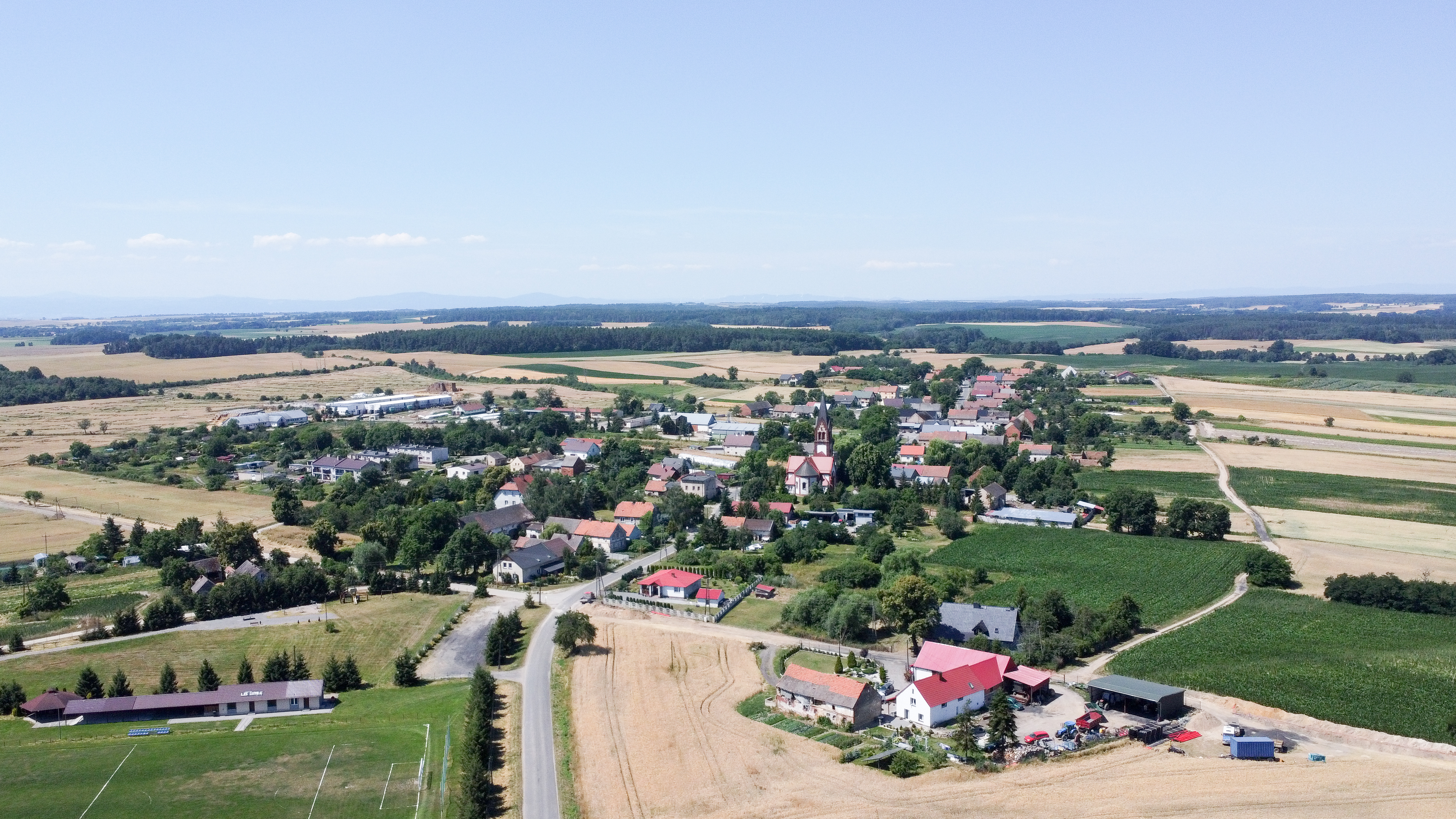

- Location within Poland
- Coordinates: 50°35′35″N 17°18′41″E
- Country: Poland
- Voivodeship: Opole
- County: Nysa
- Gmina: Skoroszyce

Czarnolas [t͡ʂarˈnɔlas] (German: Petersheide) is a village in the administrative district of Gmina Skoroszyce, within Nysa County, Opole Voivodeship, in south-western Poland.
