= Wiesław =

- Pronunciation: Polish: [ˈvjɛswaf]
- Gender: Male

Origin
- Meaning: "great glory" "all glory"

Other names
- Related names: (m.) Wielisław (f.) Wiesława

"Wiesław" is sometimes transliterated as "Wieslaw", in the absence of L with stroke.

Wiesław (Polish pronunciation: [ˈvjɛswaf]) is a Polish masculine given name, of Slavonic origin, meaning "great glory" or "all glory". It is the shortened, more common, form of the personal name Wielisław. The feminine counterpart is Wiesława [vjɛˈswava].

Individuals named Wiesław may choose their name day from the following dates: May 22, June 7, November 21, or December 9.

People with the name or its variants include:

- Wiesław Jaguś (born 1975), Polish speedway rider
- Wiesław Michnikowski (1922–2017), Polish cabaret performer
- Wiesław Myśliwski (1932–2026), Polish writer
- Wiesław Ochman (born 1937), Polish tenor
- Wiesław Perszke (born 1960), Polish long-distance runner
- Wiesław Rosocha (1945–2020), Polish graphic designer
- Wiesław Tarka (born 1964), Polish ambassador to Croatia
- Wiesław Żelazko (1933–2025), Polish mathematician
- "Comrade Wiesław", unofficial nickname of Władysław Gomułka (1905–1982), Polish communist and the actual head of state 1956–1970

== See also ==
- Stary Wielisław (old Wielisław), a village in Poland
- Polish name
- Slavic names
