= Pniewie =

- Village
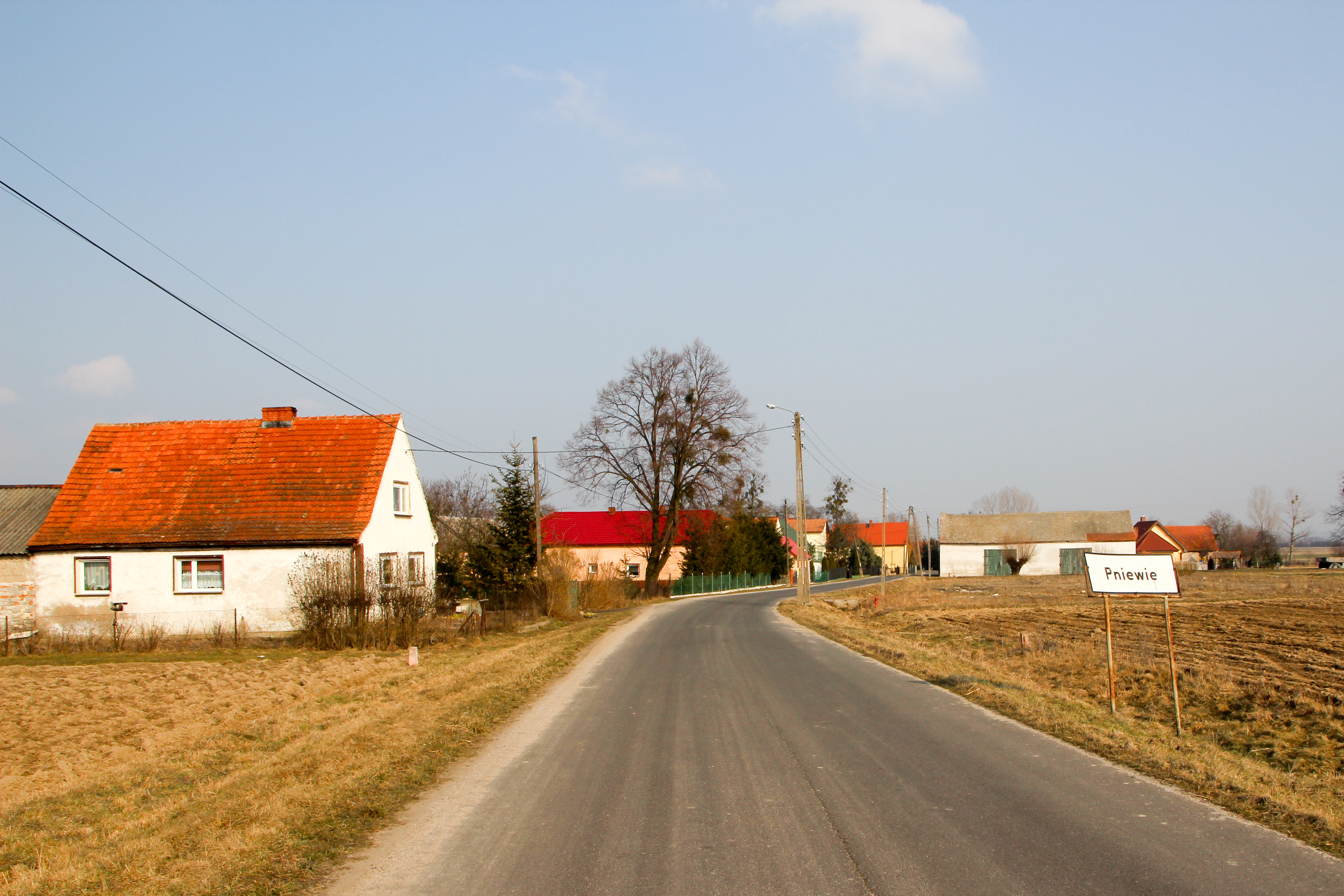

- Location within Poland
- Coordinates: 50°37′N 17°24′E
- Country: Poland
- Voivodeship: Opole
- County: Nysa
- Gmina: Skoroszyce

Pniewie [ˈpɲɛvjɛ] (German: Koppendorf) is a village in the administrative district of Gmina Skoroszyce, within Nysa County, Opole Voivodeship, in south-western Poland.
