= Adam Starostka =

Polish sprinter

Adam Starostka (born 1 January 1957) is a Polish athlete who mainly competed in the 400 m. He won the Polish Championship in 400 m in 1980.

Starostka competed for Poland at the 1980 Summer Olympics held in Moscow, Russia in the men's 4 × 400 metre relay (together with Jan Pawłowicz, Jerzy Pietrzyk, and Andrzej Stępień). He also ran the event in Tokyo in 1980; Ostrava, in 1980; London, in 1981; and Lipsk, in 1983. His personal best in the 400 m is 46.47 seconds.

Starostka graduated from the Academy of Physical Education in Kraków and currently works as a Physical Education teacher in Myszków.
