= Chróścina, Nysa County =

Chróścina
- Village
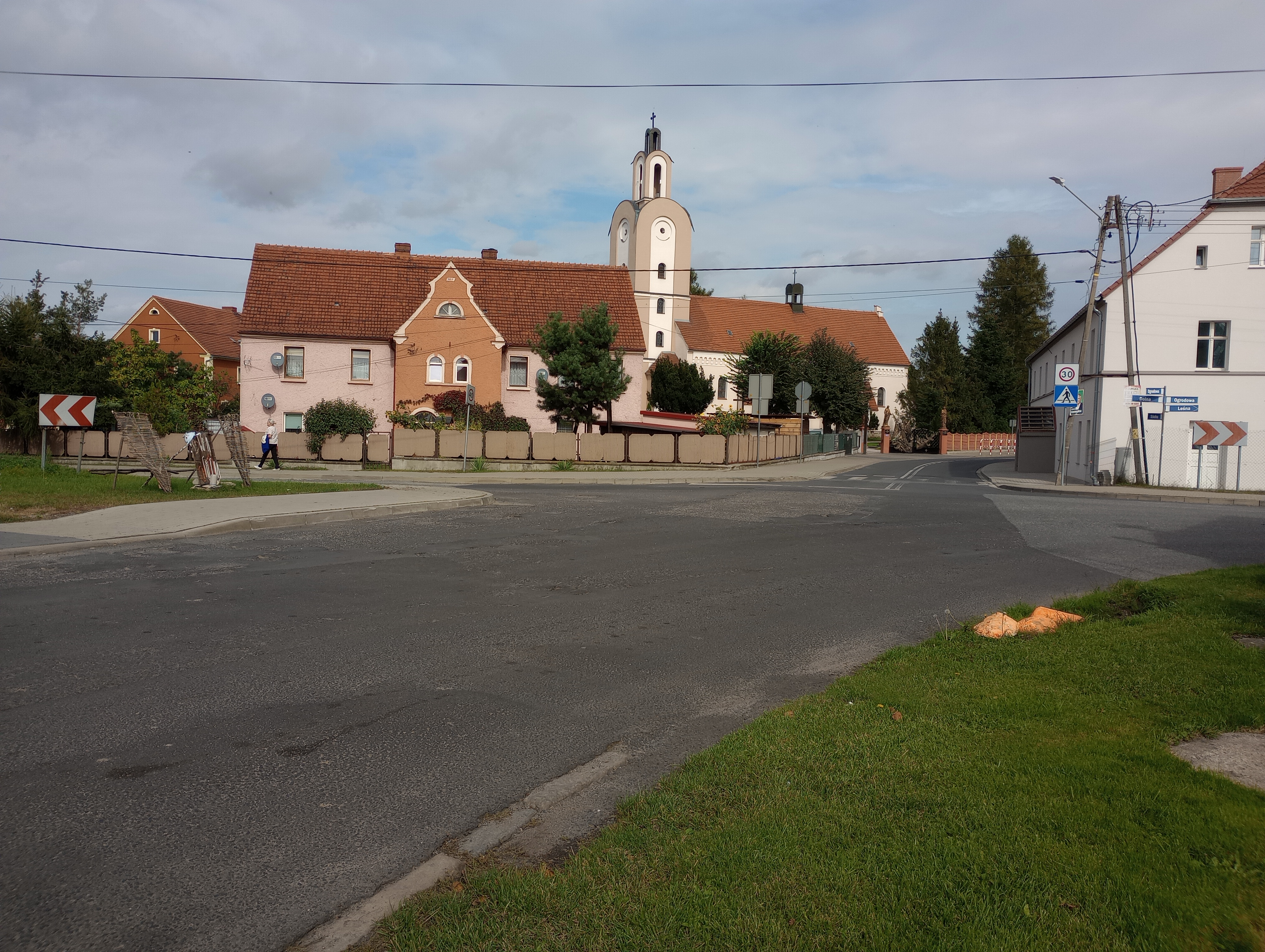

- Location within Poland
- Coordinates: 50°37′23″N 17°22′7″E
- Country: Poland
- Voivodeship: Opole
- County: Nysa
- Gmina: Skoroszyce
- Population (2021): 1,433
- Time zone: UTC+1 (CET)
  - Summer (DST): UTC+2 (CEST)
- Vehicle registration: ONY

Chróścina [xruɕˈt͡ɕina] (German: Kroschen) is a village in the administrative district of Gmina Skoroszyce, within Nysa County, Opole Voivodeship, in southern Poland.

== History ==
In the 10th century the area became part of the emerging Polish state. The village was mentioned in the Liber fundationis episcopatus Vratislaviensis from around 1305, when it was part of fragmented Piast-ruled Poland. Later on, it was also part of Bohemia (Czechia), Prussia, and Germany. During World War II, the German Nazi government operated the E451 forced labour subcamp of the Stalag VIII-B/344 prisoner-of-war camp in the village. After Germany's defeat in the war, in 1945, the village became again part of Poland.

== Transport ==
There is a train station in Chróścina, and the Voivodeship road 401 also passes through the village.

== Gallery ==
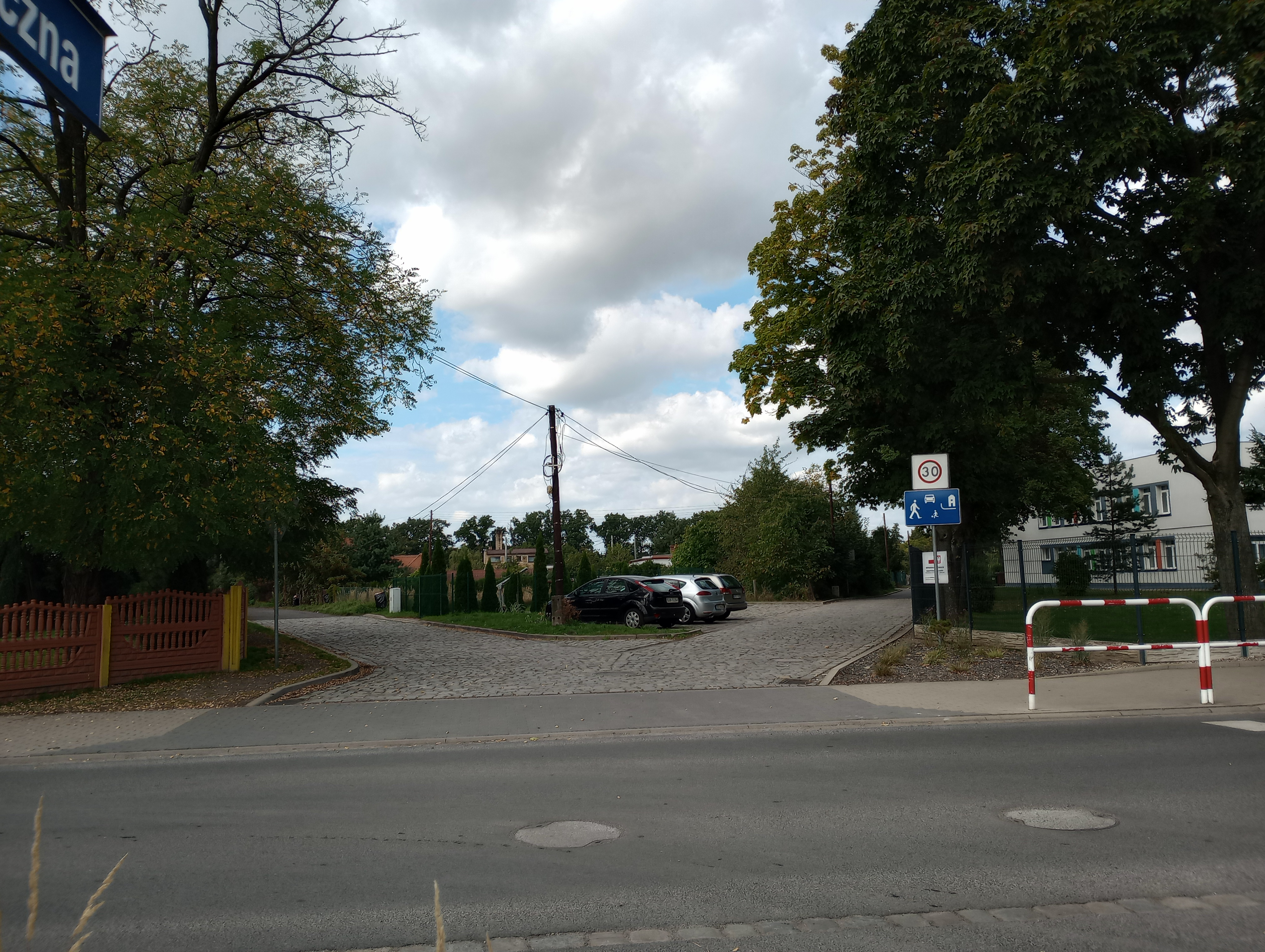

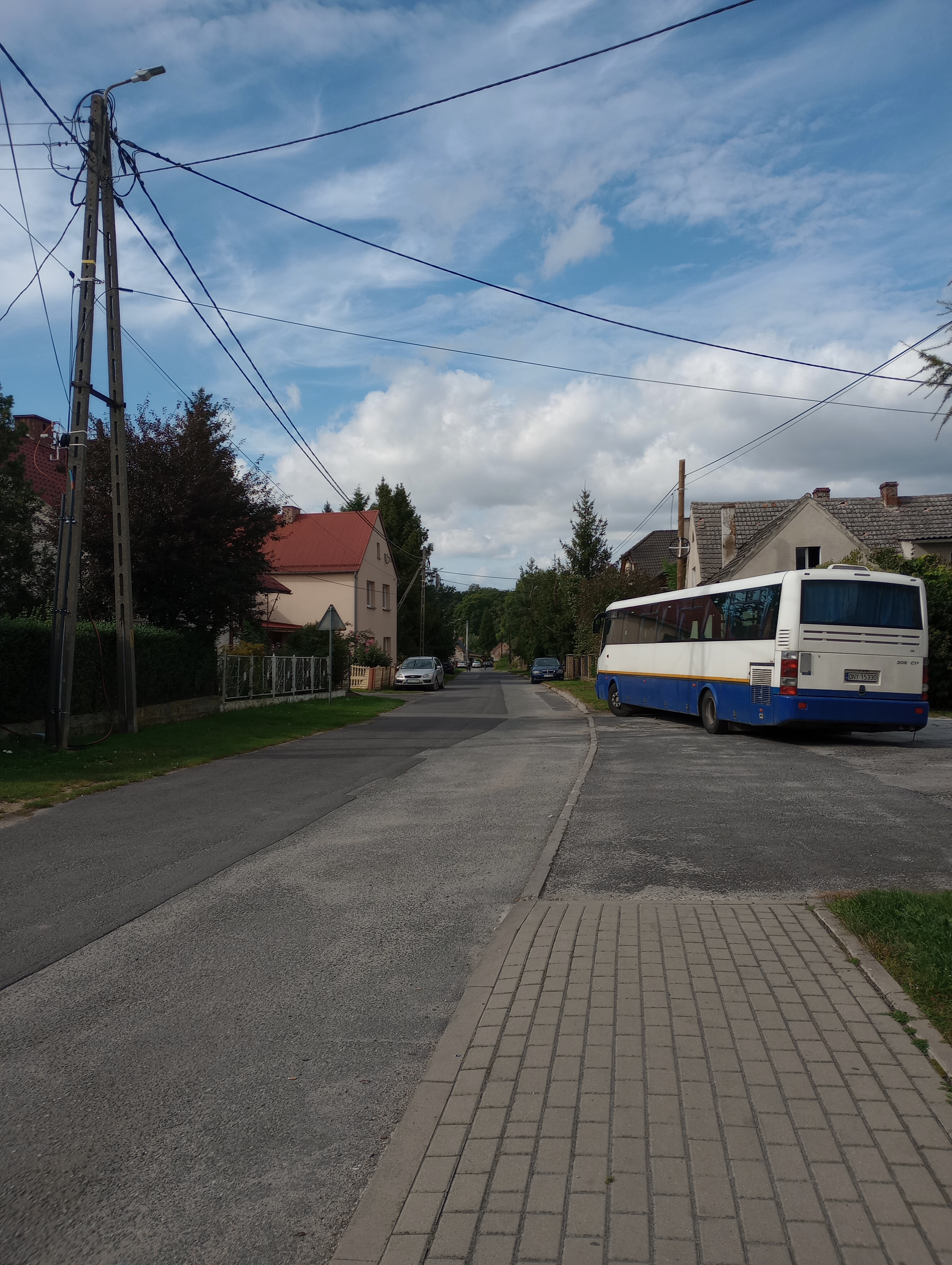

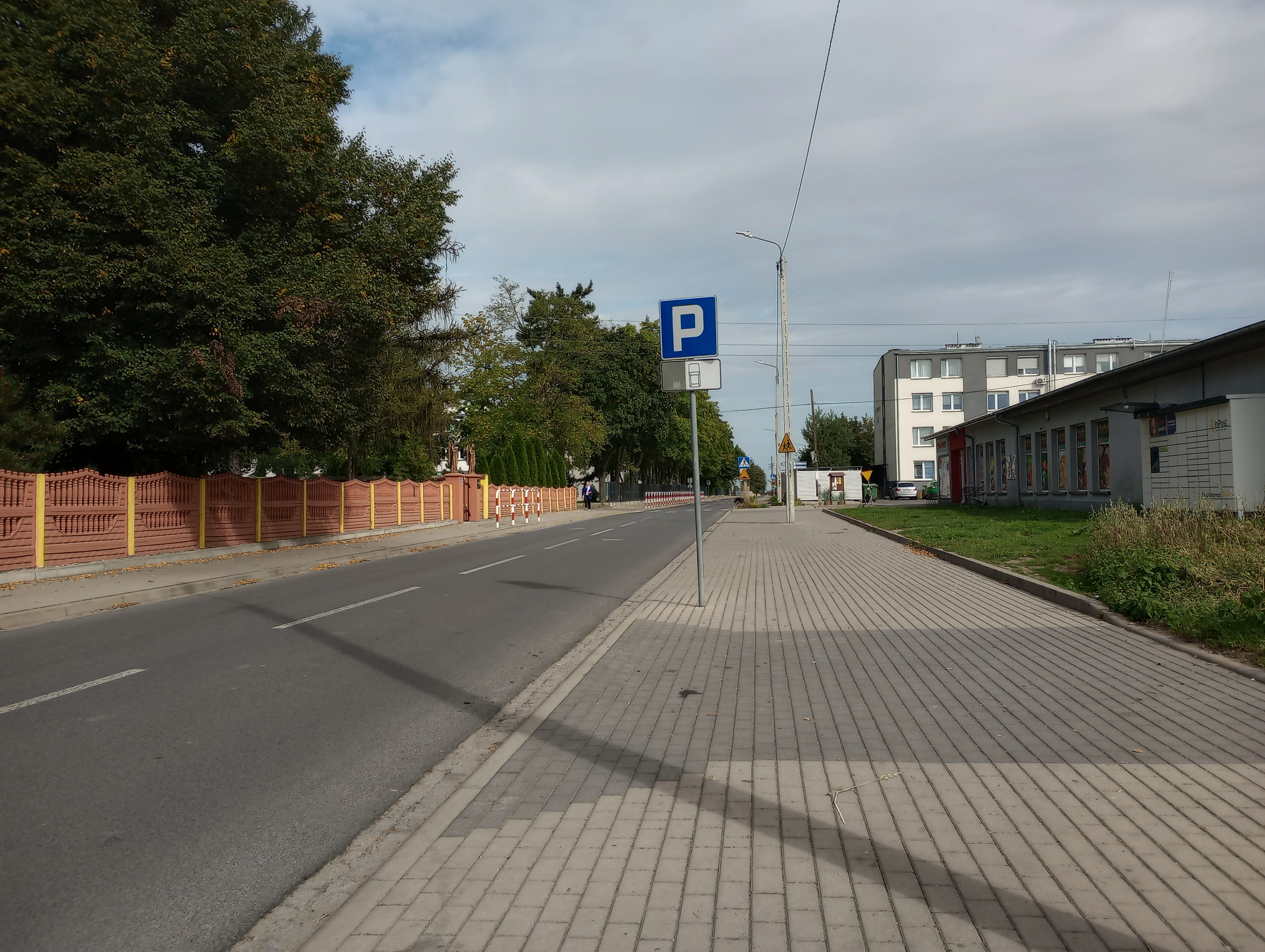

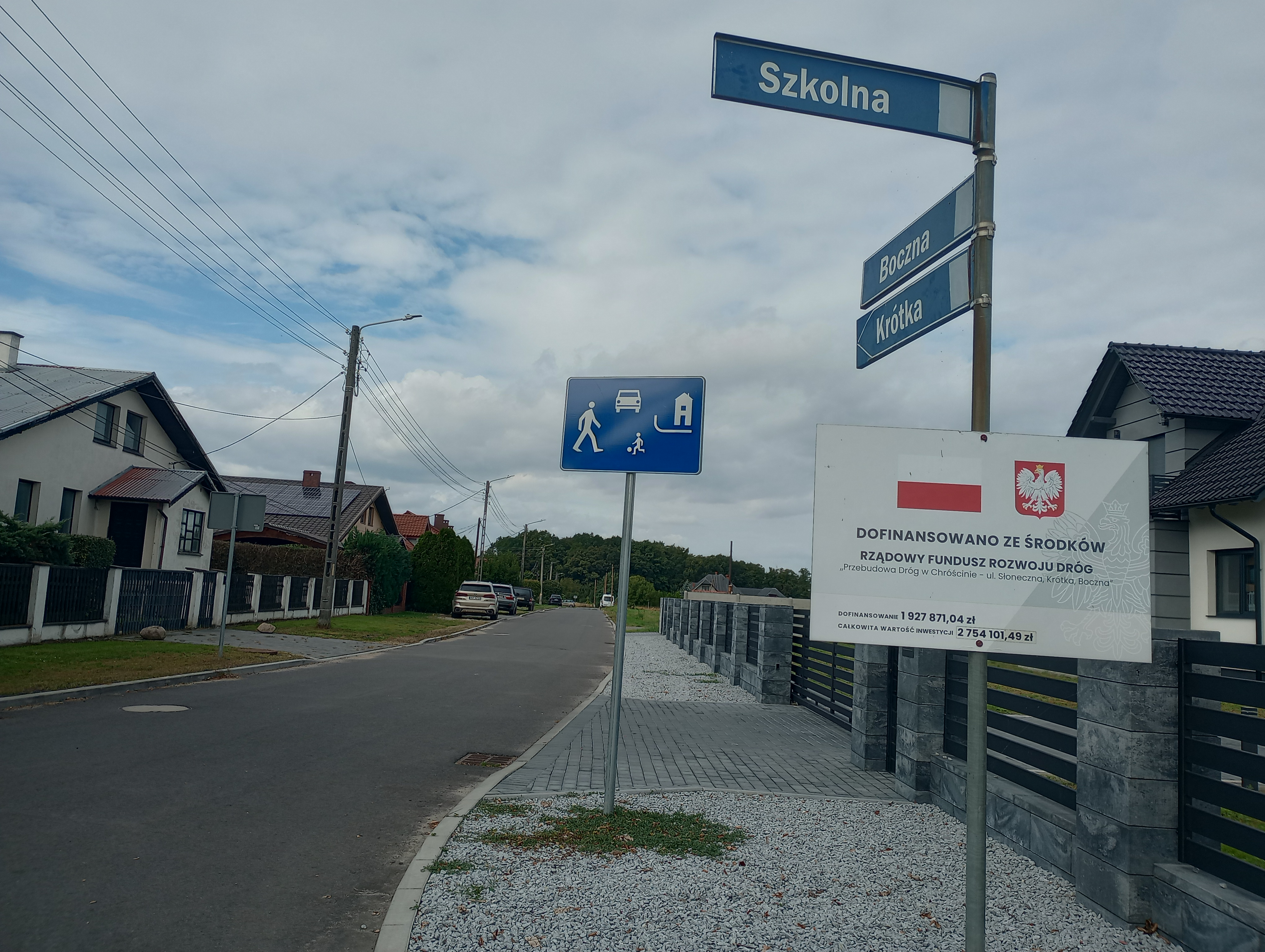
