= Mroczkowa =

- Village
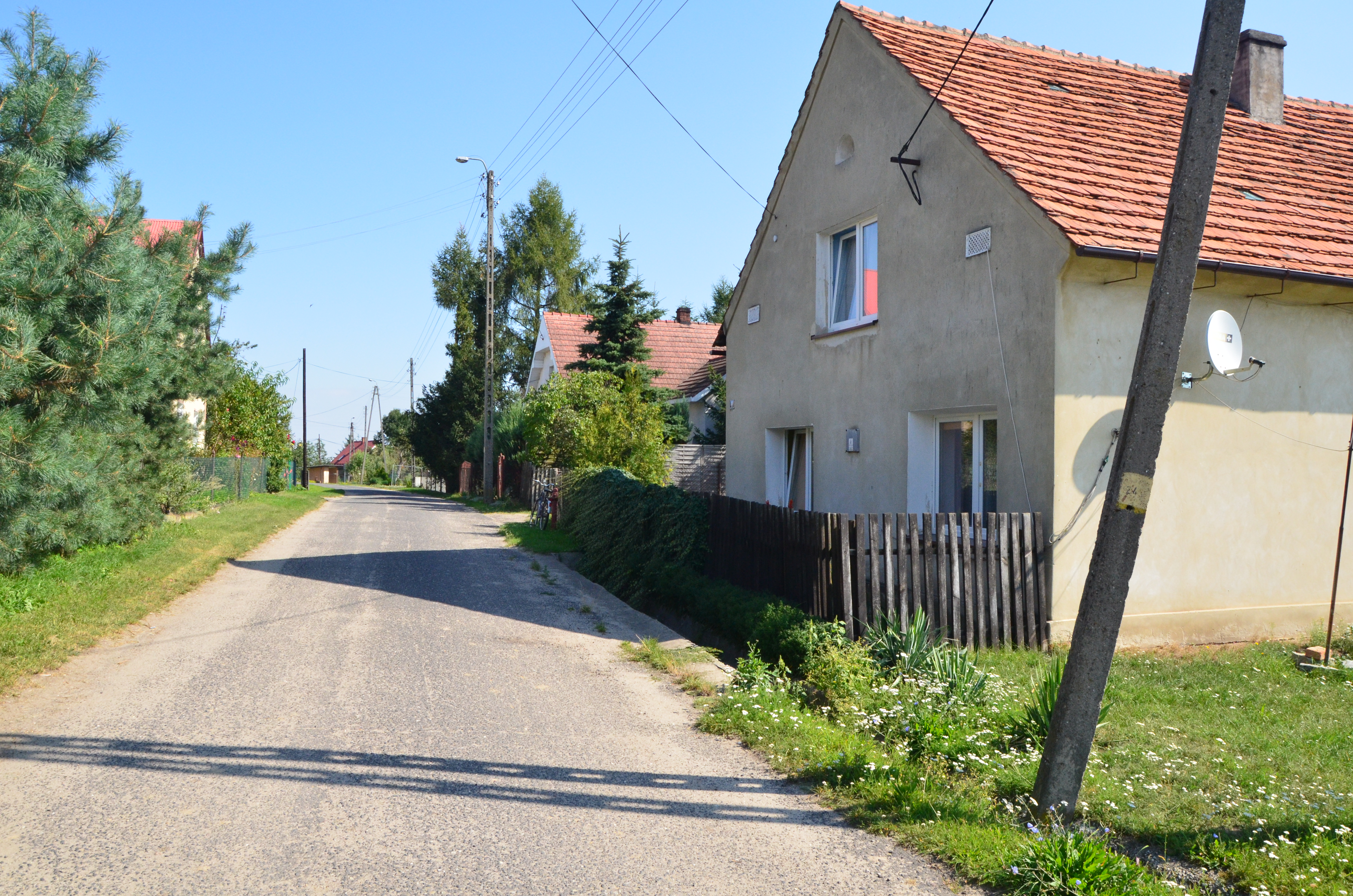

- Location within Poland
- Coordinates: 50°34′N 17°21′E
- Country: Poland
- Voivodeship: Opole
- County: Nysa
- Gmina: Skoroszyce

Mroczkowa (Polish: [mrɔt͡ʂˈkɔva], German: Eckwertsheide) is a village in the administrative district of Gmina Skoroszyce, within Nysa County, Opole Voivodeship, in south-western Poland.
