= Stary Grodków =

- Village
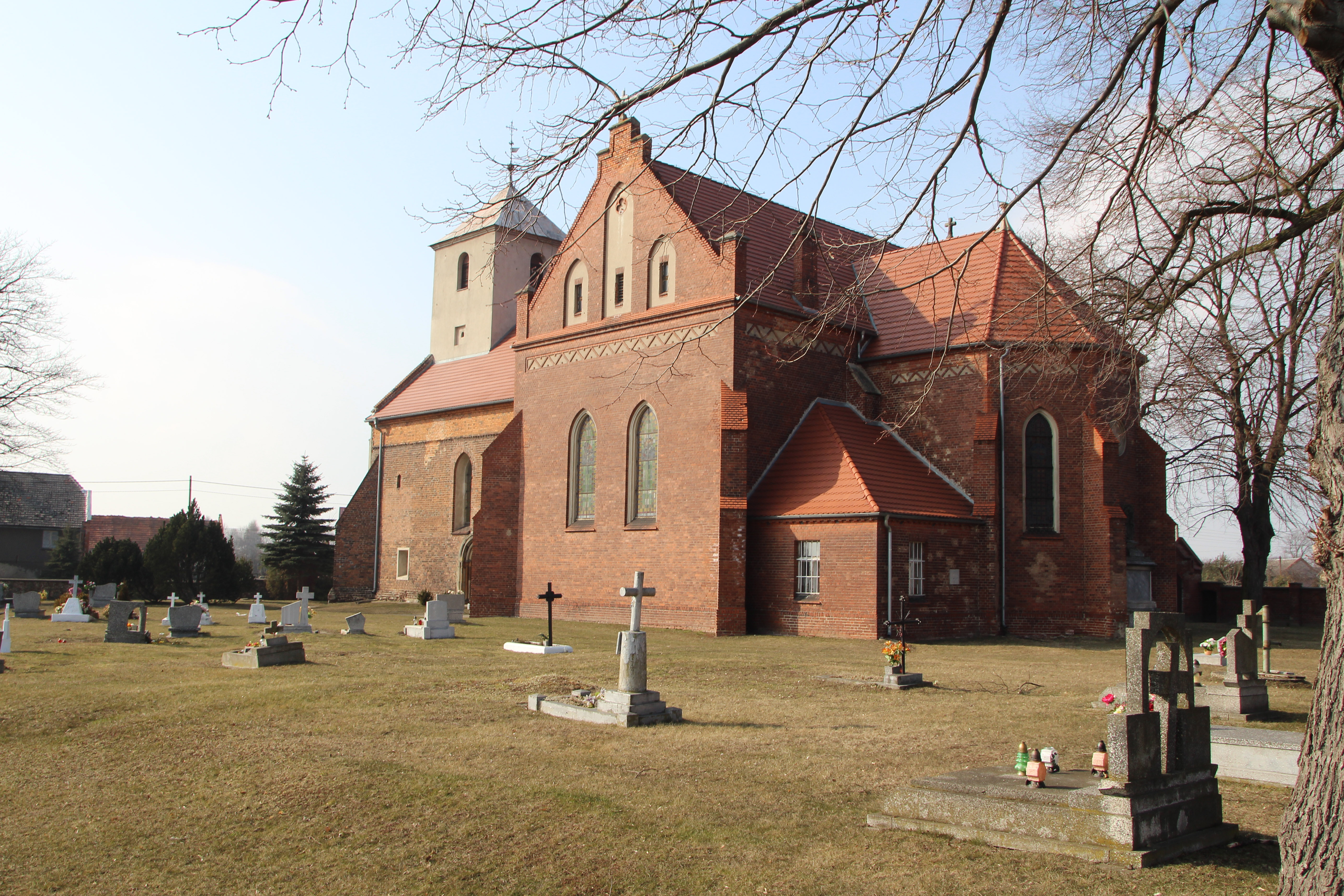
- Church of the Holy Trinity

- Location within Poland
- Coordinates: 50°39′N 17°24′E
- Country: Poland
- Voivodeship: Opole
- County: Nysa
- Gmina: Skoroszyce

Stary Grodków [ˈstarɨ ˈɡrɔtkuf] (German: Alt Grottkau) is a village in the administrative district of Gmina Skoroszyce, within Nysa County, Opole Voivodeship, in south-western Poland.
