= Wrestling at the 1980 Summer Olympics – Men's Greco-Roman 100 kg =

Men's Greco-Roman 100 kg at the Games of the XXII Olympiad
- Venue: Central Sports Club of the Army
- Dates: 21–23 July 1980
- Competitors: 9 from 9 nations

Medalists
1st place, gold medalist(s)		Georgi Raikov	Bulgaria
2nd place, silver medalist(s)		Roman Bierła	Poland
3rd place, bronze medalist(s)		Vasile Andrei	Romania

The Men's Greco-Roman 100 kg at the 1980 Summer Olympics as part of the wrestling program were held at the Athletics Fieldhouse, Central Sports Club of the Army.

== Medalists ==
Gold	Georgi Raikov; Bulgaria
Silver	Roman Bierła; Poland
Bronze	Vasile Andrei; Romania

== Tournament results ==
The competition used a form of negative points tournament, with negative points given for any result short of a fall. Accumulation of 6 negative points eliminated the loser wrestler. When only three wrestlers remain, a special final round is used to determine the order of the medals.

Legend

- TF — Won by Fall
- IN — Won by Opponent Injury
- DQ — Won by Passivity
- D1 — Won by Passivity, the winner is passive too
- D2 — Both wrestlers lost by Passivity
- FF — Won by Forfeit
- DNA — Did not appear
- TPP — Total penalty points
- MPP — Match penalty points

Penalties

- 0 — Won by Fall, Technical Superiority, Passivity, Injury and Forfeit
- 0.5 — Won by Points, 8-11 points difference
- 1 — Won by Points, 1-7 points difference
- 2 — Won by Passivity, the winner is passive too
- 3 — Lost by Points, 1-7 points difference
- 3.5 — Lost by Points, 8-11 points difference
- 4 — Lost by Fall, Technical Superiority, Passivity, Injury and Forfeit

=== Round 1 ===
TPP	MPP		Score		MPP	TPP
4	4	Tamás Gáspár (HUN)	TF / 5:06	Nikolai Balboshin (URS)	0	0
0	0	Vasile Andrei (ROU)	DQ / 5:37	Refik Memišević (YUG)	4	4
4	4	Svend Studsgaard (DEN)	DQ / 5:58	Roman Bierła (POL)	0	0
0	0	Georgios Poikilidis (GRE)	DQ / 7:05	Oldřich Dvořák (TCH)	4	4
5		Georgi Raikov (BUL)		Bye		

=== Round 2 ===
TPP	MPP		Score		MPP	TPP
0	0	Georgi Raikov (BUL)	DQ / 8:05	Tamás Gáspár (HUN)	4	8
4	4	Nikolai Balboshin (URS)	IN / 1:53	Vasile Andrei (ROU)	0	0
4	0	Refik Memišević (YUG)	DQ / 3:58	Svend Studsgaard (DEN)	4	8
0	0	Roman Bierła (POL)	DQ / 5:27	Georgios Pikilidis (GRE)	4	4
4		Oldřich Dvořák (TCH)		Bye		

=== Round 3 ===
TPP	MPP		Score		MPP	TPP
8	4	Oldřich Dvořák (TCH)	DQ / 6:39	Georgi Raikov (BUL)	0	0
4	4	Vasile Andrei (ROU)	DQ / 7:24	Roman Bierła (POL)	0	0
4	0	Refik Memišević (YUG)	DQ / 5:15	Georgios Pikilidis (GRE)	4	8
4		Nikolai Balboshin (URS)		DNA		

=== Round 4 ===
TPP	MPP		Score		MPP	TPP
1	1	Georgi Raikov (BUL)	7 - 2	Vasile Andrei (ROU)	3	7
7	3	Refik Memišević (YUG)	2 - 5	Roman Bierła (POL)	1	1

=== Final ===
Results from the preliminary round are carried forward into the final (shown in yellow).

TPP	MPP		Score		MPP	TPP
	4	Vasile Andrei (ROU)	DQ / 7:24	Roman Bierła (POL)	0	
	1	Georgi Raikov (BUL)	7 - 2	Vasile Andrei (ROU)	3	7
3	2	Georgi Raikov (BUL)	D1 / 7:52	Roman Bierła (POL)	4	4

== Final standings ==
1. Georgi Raikov (BUL)
2. Roman Bierła (POL)
3. Vasile Andrei (ROU)
4. Refik Memišević (YUG)
5. Georgios Pikilidis (GRE)
6. Oldřich Dvořák (TCH)
7. Nikolai Balboshin (URS)
8. Svend Studsgaard (DEN)
