= Oldřich Dvořák =

Czech wrestler

Personal information
- Nationality: Czech
- Born: 22 December 1953 (age 72) Duchcov, Czechoslovakia

Sport
- Sport: Wrestling

Oldřich Dvořák (born 22 December 1953) is a Czech wrestler. He competed in the men's Greco-Roman 100 kg at the 1980 Summer Olympics.
