= Michalina Plekaniec =

Polish hockey player

Personal information
- Nationality: Polish
- Born: 15 September 1960 (age 65) Skoroszyce, Poland

Sport
- Sport: Field hockey

Michalina Plekaniec (born 15 September 1960) is a Polish field hockey player. She competed in the women's tournament at the 1980 Summer Olympics.
