= Prem Maya Sonir =

Indian field hockey player

Medal record
Women's field hockey
Representing India
Asian Games
Gold medal – first place	1982 Delhi	Team competition
Bronze medal – third place	1986 Seoul	Team competition

Prem Maya Sonir (born July 14, 1961) is an Indian former field hockey player. During the 1980 Olympics, she was one of the star members of India's hockey team which also included the Saini Sisters and Lorraine Fernandes where they defeated Austria and Poland. They came fourth missing out on a bronze medal.

She was a member of the women's hockey team of India, which won the gold medal in the 1982 Asian Games held in New Delhi.

She also serves as the coach of the Indian Railways women hockey team, which has won the women's national hockey championship a number of times. She was also the captain of the national women's hockey team. She received the Arjuna Award in 1985.
