= Zbigniew Woźnicki =

Polish cyclist

Personal information
- Born: 21 June 1958 Budy-Grzybek, Poland
- Died: 26 February 2008 (aged 49) Żyrardów, Poland

Cycling career
- Sport: Cycling

Zbigniew Woźnicki (21 June 1958 – 26 February 2008) was a Polish cyclist. He competed in the individual and team pursuit events at the 1980 Summer Olympics.
