= Rupa Kumari Saini =

Indian hockey player

Personal information
- Nationality: Indian
- Born: 2 September 1954 (age 71) Faridkot, Punjab, India

Sport
- Sport: Field hockey

Rupa Kumari Saini (born 2 September 1954) is an Indian field hockey player. She competed in the women's tournament at the 1980 Summer Olympics. She is a member of the Saini Sisters hockey family.

== Early life and education ==
Saini was born in Patiala, Punjab. She earned a doctorate and worked at the Government College of Physical Education, Patiala. Later, she became the principal of the Government Mohindra college, Patiala and also served as the head of the department of Physical Education Department, Punjabi University.

== Career ==
Saini captained the Indian hockey team for many years. She was part of the first Indian Olympic women's team in 1980 at Moscow along with her sisters. She is one of the four hockey sisters from Patiala. Her elder sister Prema also captained the Indian hockey team. The other sisters are Krishna and Swarna. She was the national selector for many years and the manager for the Indian team which won gold at the 2002 Commonwealth Games. She represented India in many tournaments including Asia Cup at Kyota in 1981 where India won the gold, USSR test series, World Cup in 1978, Begum Rasul Trophy in 1975 and FIH World Cup 1974 at France.

== Awards ==
- Saini was conferred with the Arjuna Award in 1975.
