= Roman Bierła =

Polish Greco-Roman wrestler

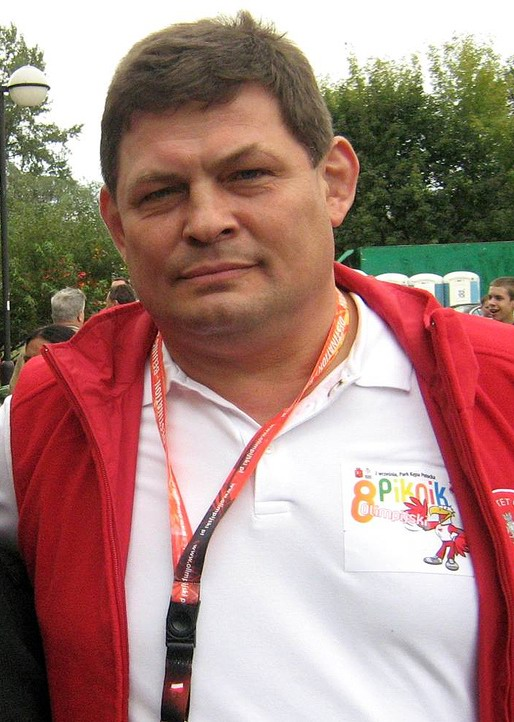
- Roman Bierła

Medal record

Men's Greco-Roman Wrestling

Representing Poland

Olympic Games
Silver medal – second place	1980 Moscow	Heavyweight

European Championships
Silver medal – second place	1979 Bucharest	Heavyweight

Roman Bierła (born 21 March 1957 in Katowice) is a Polish wrestler (Greco-Roman style).
