= Andrzej Michalak =

Polish cyclist

Personal information
- Born: 7 April 1959 (age 67) Radom, Poland
- Height: 179 cm (5 ft 10 in)

Cycling career
- Sport: Cycling

Andrzej Michalak (born 7 April 1959) is a Polish former cyclist. He competed in the 1000m time trial and team pursuit events at the 1980 Summer Olympics.
