= Brzeziny, Nysa County =

Brzeziny
- Village
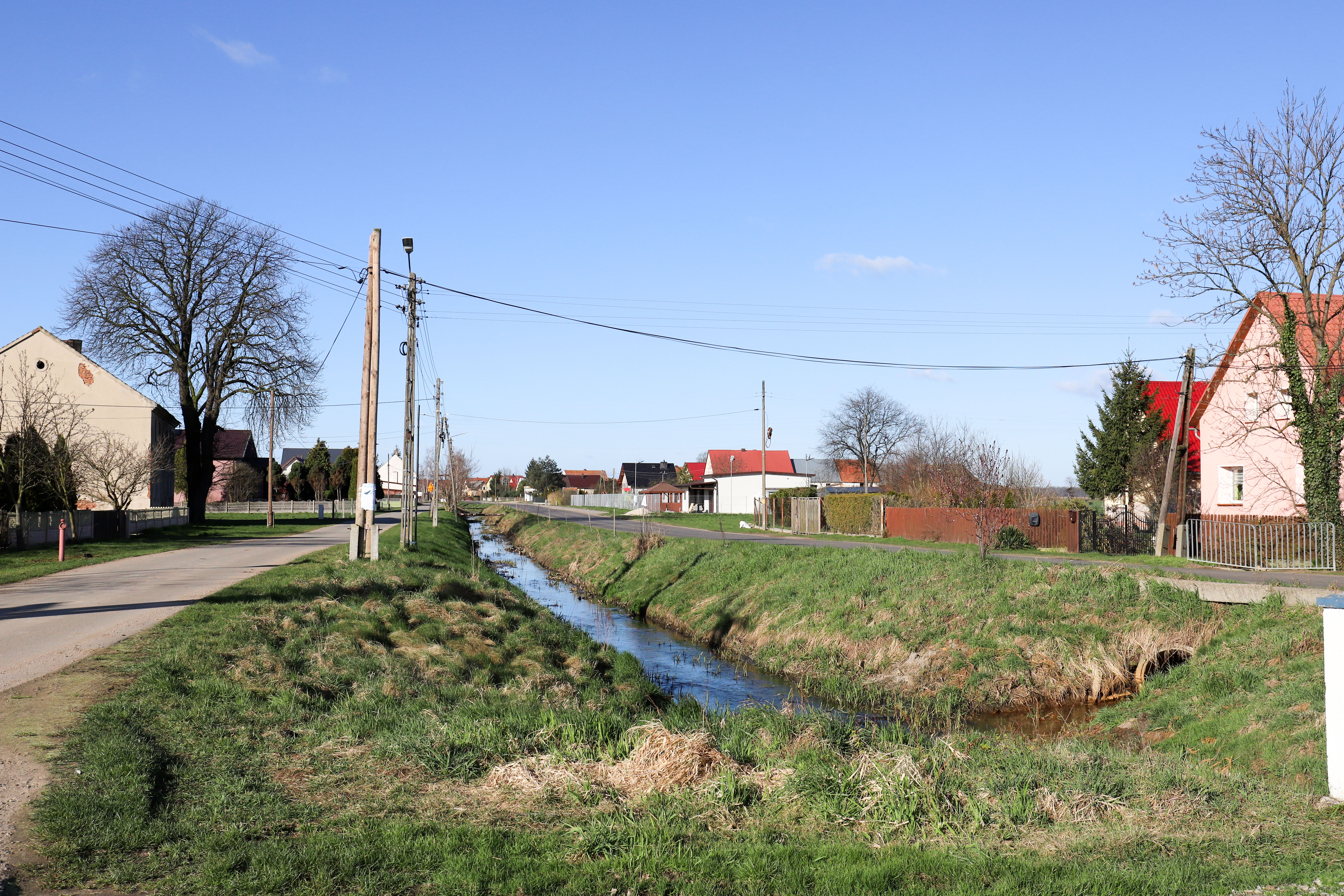

- Location within Poland
- Coordinates: 50°36′N 17°27′E
- Country: Poland
- Voivodeship: Opole
- County: Nysa
- Gmina: Skoroszyce

Brzeziny [bʐɛˈʑinɨ] (German: Gross Briesen) is a village in the administrative district of Gmina Skoroszyce, within Nysa County, Opole Voivodeship, in south-western Poland.
