= Davaasürengiin Oyuuntuyaa =

Mongolian gymnast (born 1966)

- Даваасүрэнгийн Оюунтуяа
- Born: 29 July 1966 (age 60)
- Height: 155 cm (5 ft 1 in)

Gymnastics career
- Discipline: Women's artistic gymnastics
- Country represented: Mongolia

Davaasürengiin Oyuuntuyaa (Mongolian: Даваасүрэнгийн Оюунтуяа; born 29 July 1966) is a Mongolian former artistic gymnast. At the age of 13, she competed at the 1980 Summer Olympics and finished 26th in the individual all-around.

== Career ==
Oyuuntuyaa began gymnastics in 1975. When she was 13 years old, she was one of 43 athletes that represented Mongolia at the 1980 Summer Olympics. She finished 26th in the individual all-around competition. Between 1976 and 1988, she won 16 city and state championships.

Since the end of her competitive gymnastics career, Oyuuntuyaa has worked as a coach and a commentator, including commentating Gymnastics at the 2016 Summer Olympics for MNB Channel One. In 2015, she received the "best coach of the capital" award from the Department of Physical Sports of the Capital for her work with the youth national gymnastics team.
