= Harpreet Gill =

Indian field hockey player

Personal information
- Nationality: Indian
- Born: 28 October 1958 (age 67)

Sport
- Sport: Field hockey

Harpreet Gill (born 28 October 1958) is an Indian field hockey player. She competed in the women's tournament at the 1980 Summer Olympics.
