= Rekha Bhide =

Indian Women's Field Hockey Player (Retired)

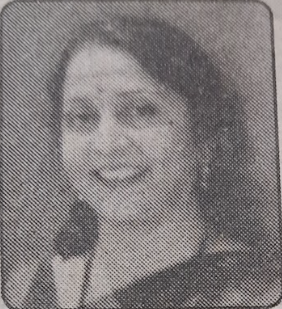
- Rekha Bhide (née Mundphan) - (Retired) Indian Women's Field Hockey player, Olympian, coach, selector, and sports administrator

Personal information
- Full name: Rekha Girish Bhide
- Nationality: Indian
- Born: Rekha Bhagwantrao Mundphan; 13 April 1956 (age 70) Alegaon, Shirur City, Maharashtra state, India
- Spouse: (late) Girish Bhide (July 1, 1955 — Sep 22, 2019)
- Children: 2 sons (Alok, Shomit)

Sport
- Sport: Field hockey
- Position: Right Half (India), Centre Half & Right Half (Maharashtra, Indian Railways)

Rekha Girish Bhide (Rekha Bhagwantrao Mundphan before marriage) (born 13 April 1956) is a former Indian women’s field hockey player, coach, selector, and sports administrator. She has played national-level, domestic, and international tournaments since 1969, including the 1980 Summer Olympics in Moscow, where she served as vice-captain of the national team. Following her playing career, she held leadership and administrative roles in Indian hockey at the Maharashtra state and national levels.

At the domestic level, she represented Indian Railways and her home state of Maharashtra in national field hockey competitions. Her earliest national-level appearance came at the National Women’s Hockey Championship, where she represented Maharashtra as a teenager. She was the youngest member (age 13) of the Maharashtra state team that won the championship in Calcutta in 1969.

Her contributions to sport were first recognized at the Maharashtra state level with the Shiv Chhatrapati Award (1976-77) and later at the national level with the Arjuna Award (1979-80).

The Arjuna Award is widely regarded as the highest honor awarded to sportspersons by the Government of India. Following her playing career, she served briefly as a coach/manager for Maharashtra in the early 1980s, and later as a national selector for the Indian women’s hockey team.

== Early career development ==
Rekha grew up in a large family in Alegaon near Shirur and later moved to Pune for her education. At the school level, she started as an athlete and originally competed as a runner before switching to hockey after she injured her leg in an accident at age 11. She continued playing hockey through local and school-level competitions. During her early teenage years, she trained consistently while attending school in Pashan (in Pune), cycling approximately 35 km daily to reach practice sessions.

She subsequently progressed to higher levels of competitive hockey where her previous training in athletics contributed to her development. Throughout her early career growth, she credits her sports teacher Mr. Dean Doctor at her school, St. Joseph's Convent in Pashan, Pune for helping her transition from athletics to hockey after her injury. She also received support from her family and guidance from her Hockey mentor Minoo Golakhari at the Kayani Club, Pune.

== Family ==
Rekha’s late husband, Girish Bhide, supported her transition into administrative and coaching roles following her retirement from competitive field hockey. He came from a sporting background and represented Poona University (University of Pune) in Inter University games in multiple sports, including football, tennis, and basketball. For the same, he was awarded a special Gold medal by the university.

She is a mother to two sons, Alok and Shomit.

Her elder son, Alok, is a former competitive tennis player at the ITF Juniors and ATP pro tours with a highest ranking of world number 1297 in Singles, which he achieved in 2011. He is associated with and directs a tennis coaching company called Capital Sports in Singapore.

Her younger son, Shomit, represented Maharashtra at the under-15 and under-17 levels in cricket. In 2010, he was selected in the Maharashtra Premier Cricket League auction by the Pratapgad Warriors team. His playing career was later affected by knee injuries. He is listed as a member of RESQ, a wildlife rescue organization based in Pune.

== Playing career ==
Rekha represented India in international women’s field hockey competitions during the 1970s and 1980s. She competed at the 1980 Summer Olympics in Moscow. Her international representations and team distinctions include:

- Captain of Indian Women’s hockey team at the Pre-Olympic tournament held in Moscow in 1979
- Vice-captain of the Indian women’s hockey team at the 1980 Summer Olympics
- Member of the Indian squad at the 1st Women’s Hockey World Cup in Cannes, France (1974)
- Member of the Indian squad at the 2nd Women’s Hockey World Cup in Madrid, Spain (1978)
- Member of the Indian team at the IFWHA Conference and Tournament in Edinburgh, Scotland (1975)
- Member of the Indian squad that won the Begum Rasool International Trophy at Madras (Chennai) in 1975

She played at the 1974 Women’s Hockey World Cup at age 17. During that tournament, she was a member of the Indian team that defeated the Netherlands 2–1 and later lost to Argentina.

At the national and domestic-circuit level, she represented Maharashtra and institutional teams including Indian Railways, and competed in domestic championships beginning in 1969. During this period, she also:

- Participated in the Indo–USSR women’s field hockey Test series.
- Received Best Player distinctions at national-level tournaments in 1971, 1973, and 1976.
- Captained the Combined Universities team that finished as joint winners in 1977.

== Administrative and coaching career ==
Following her retirement from competitive hockey, Rekha transitioned into coaching and sports administration.

She was the player-cum-manager of her home state team of Maharashtra at the 40th National Women’s Hockey Championship in Trivandrum; the team did not reach quarter-finals but did beat the Tamil Nadu state team at the group stage.

After a brief tenure as a hockey coach in the early to mid-1980s, she completed formal training programmes in sports administration and elite coaching conducted by the International Olympic Committee (IOC) and the International Hockey Federation (FIH).

This marked the start of her sustained involvement in hockey governance, allowing her to move fully into administrative roles.

Her involvement in sports administration extended to academia and institutional sport, including participation as a Committee Member in sports advisory bodies associated with higher education institutions.

Rekha also served as the manager of the Indian women’s team at the 2012 Junior Asia Cup, where the team finished with a silver medal, losing 2–5 to China in the final.

She also held administrative roles in state-level women’s hockey, including serving as the President of Women's Hockey Association of Maharashtra (WHAM) and Hockey Maharashtra.

She also served in national team selection roles, acting as a selector for the Indian women’s hockey team during squad selections for international tournaments and as a member of the Hockey India National Selection Committee.

She later served as an elected Vice President of Hockey India, a position that became the subject of legal proceedings during a period of administrative disputes within Indian hockey governance. In 2012, she was involved in a dispute over leadership recognition as President of Hockey Maharashtra, which was reported by independent media. In 2013, she wrote to the then Sports Minister of India alleging she had been subjected to harassment and defamation by Hockey India officials. Subsequently, the Bombay High Court directed Hockey India to restore her name as Vice President, following challenges to administrative actions taken during that period. These matters are documented in judicial records and contemporaneous media reports.

She also worked in sports administration roles within various Indian Railways zonal offices. She retired as Senior Sports Officer for the Central Railways zone from Indian Railways.

In addition to administrative roles, Rekha Bhide has contributed as a hockey expert for live shows and post-match interviews during international tournaments, World Cup events, and Olympic hockey coverage, with appearances in newspapers and on local (Marathi) television channels including Top News Marathi, Zee 24 Taas, and Lokshahi Marathi.

== Awards and recognition ==
Her contributions to Indian hockey have been recognized through several awards and recognitions, including:

- Arjuna Award (1979–80)
- Shiv Chhatrapati Award
- Citation of Honour as an Ideal Sports Personality by MIT World Peace University (WPU) at the MIT-WPU Summit (2025)
- The Most Elegant Player award in the 1979 pre-Olympics tournament in Moscow as the captain of the Indian team
