= Bogumiła Pajor =

Polish field hockey player

Personal information
- Nationality: Polish
- Born: 21 June 1960 (age 65) Skoroszyce, Poland

Sport
- Sport: Field hockey

Bogumiła Pajor (born 21 June 1960) is a Polish field hockey player. She competed in the women's tournament at the 1980 Summer Olympics.
