= Jadwiga Kołdras =

Polish hockey player

Personal information
- Nationality: Polish
- Born: 3 September 1959 (age 66) Skoroszyce, Poland

Sport
- Sport: Field hockey

Jadwiga Kołdras (born 3 September 1959) is a Polish field hockey player. She competed in the women's tournament at the 1980 Summer Olympics.
