= Svend Studsgaard =

Danish wrestler (1947–2022)

Svend Erik Studsgaard
Personal information
- Nationality: Danish
- Born: 28 January 1947 Frederikshavn, Denmark
- Died: 15 September 2022 (aged 75) Frederikshavn, Denmark

Sport
- Sport: Wrestling

Svend Erik Studsgaard (28 January 1947 – 15 September 2022) was a Danish wrestler. He competed in the men's Greco-Roman 100 kg at the 1980 Summer Olympics.
