= Makowice, Opole Voivodeship =

Makowice
- Village
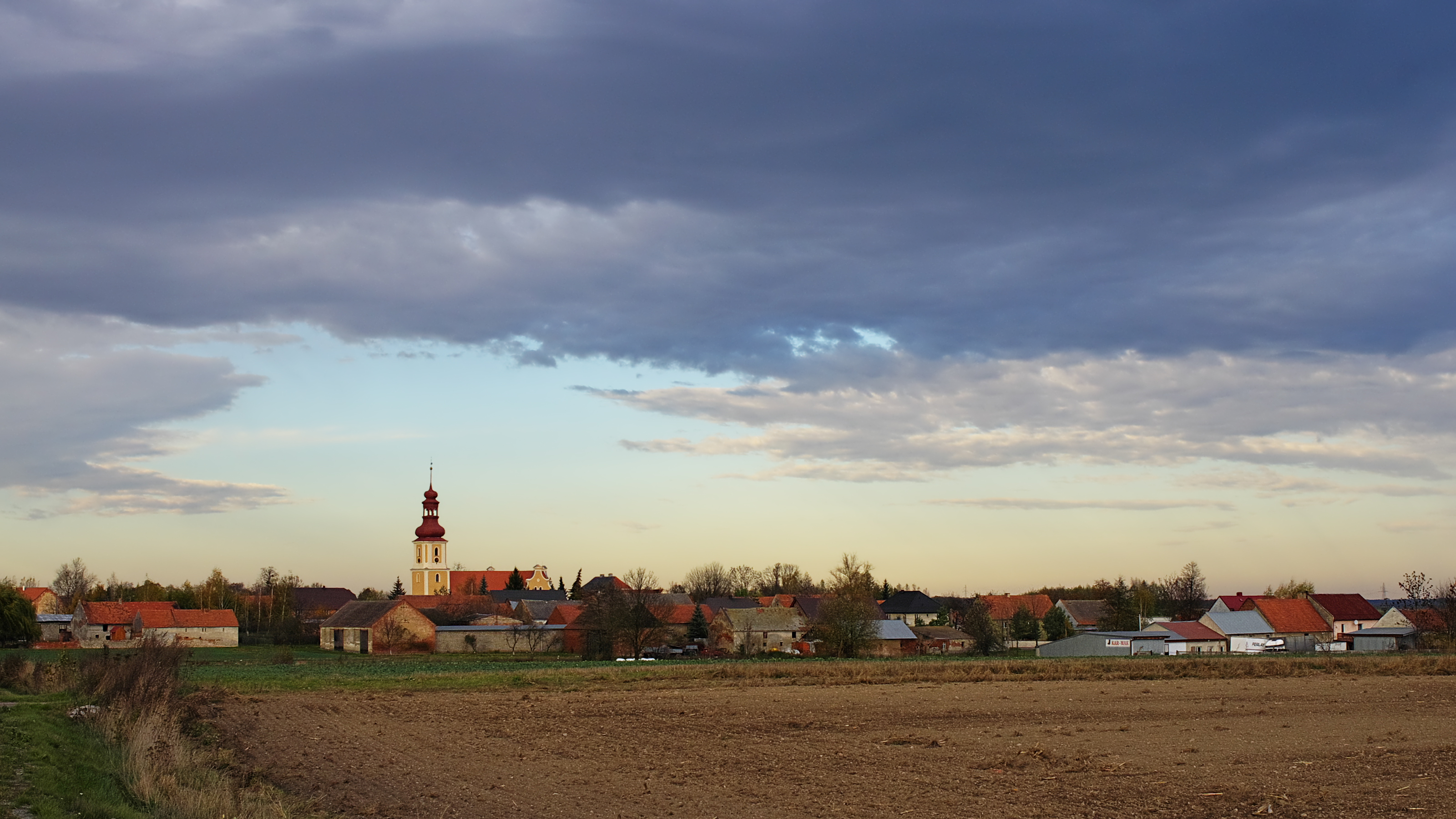

- Location within Poland
- Coordinates: 50°34′N 17°23′E
- Country: Poland
- Voivodeship: Opole
- County: Nysa
- Gmina: Skoroszyce

Makowice [makɔˈvit͡sɛ] (German: Mogwitz) is a village in the administrative district of Gmina Skoroszyce, within Nysa County, Opole Voivodeship, in south-western Poland.
