= Katarzyna Snopko =

Polish gymnast

Personal information
- Nationality: Polish
- Born: 11 August 1965 (age 59); Warsaw, Poland

Sport
- Sport: Gymnastics

Katarzyna Snopko (born 11 August 1965) is a Polish gymnast. She competed in six events at the 1980 Summer Olympics.
