= Danuta Stanisławska =

Polish field hockey player

Personal information
- Nationality: Polish
- Born: 4 October 1958 (age 67) Rogowo, Poland

Sport
- Sport: Field hockey

Danuta Stanisławska (born 4 October 1958) is a Polish field hockey player. She competed in the women's tournament at the 1980 Summer Olympics.
