= Maria Kornek =

Polish hockey player

Personal information
- Nationality: Polish
- Born: 7 March 1960 (age 66) Starowice, Poland

Sport
- Sport: Field hockey

Maria Kornek (born 7 March 1960) is a Polish field hockey player. She competed in the women's tournament at the 1980 Summer Olympics.
