= Halina Kołdras =

Polish field hockey player

Personal information
- Nationality: Polish
- Born: 15 May 1958 (age 67) Grodków, Poland

Sport
- Sport: Field hockey

Halina Kołdras (born 15 May 1958) is a Polish field hockey player. She competed in the women's tournament at the 1980 Summer Olympics.
