= Małgorzata Majza =

Polish gymnast

Personal information
- Nationality: Polish
- Born: 22 February 1965 (age 60); Ruda Śląska, Poland

Sport
- Sport: Gymnastics

Małgorzata Majza (born 22 February 1965) is a Polish gymnast. She competed in six events at the 1980 Summer Olympics.
