= Anita Jokiel =

Polish gymnast

Personal information
- Nationality: Polish
- Born: 2 December 1966 (age 58); Ruda Śląska, Poland

Sport
- Sport: Gymnastics

Anita Jokiel (born 2 December 1966) is a Polish gymnast. She competed in six events at the 1980 Summer Olympics.

As of 2025, she is the youngest Olympian to represent Poland. She was 13 years, 232 days old when she participated in the 1980 Olympics.
