= Jolanta Błędowska =

Polish hockey player

Personal information
- Nationality: Polish
- Born: 17 September 1963 (age 62) Katowice, Poland

Sport
- Sport: Field hockey

Jolanta Błędowska (born 17 September 1963) is a Polish field hockey player. She competed in the women's tournament at the 1980 Summer Olympics.
