= Małgorzata Gajewska =

Polish hockey player

Personal information
- Nationality: Polish
- Born: 24 April 1962 (age 63) Grodków, Poland

Sport
- Sport: Field hockey

Małgorzata Gajewska (born 24 April 1962) is a Polish field hockey player. She competed in the women's tournament at the 1980 Summer Olympics.
