= Jolanta Sekulak =

Polish hockey player

Personal information
- Nationality: Polish
- Born: 17 August 1958 (age 67) Wrocław, Poland

Sport
- Sport: Field hockey

Jolanta Sekulak (born 17 August 1958) is a Polish field hockey player. She competed in the women's tournament at the 1980 Summer Olympics.
