= Wiesława Żelaskowska =

Polish gymnast

Personal information
- Nationality: Polish
- Born: 13 September 1964 (age 60); Olsztyn, Poland

Sport
- Sport: Gymnastics

Wiesława Żelaskowska (born 13 September 1964) is a Polish gymnast. She competed in six events at the 1980 Summer Olympics.
