= Dorota Załęczna =

Polish field hockey player

Personal information
- Nationality: Polish
- Born: 15 November 1961 (age 64) Wrocław, Poland

Sport
- Sport: Field hockey

Dorota Załęczna (born 15 November 1961) is a Polish field hockey player. She competed in the women's tournament at the 1980 Summer Olympics.
