= Lorraine Fernandes =

Indian hockey player

Personal information
- Nationality: Indian
- Born: 24 December 1954 (age 71)

Sport
- Country: India
- Sport: Field hockey

Lorraine Fernandes (born 24 December 1954) is an Indian field hockey player. She competed in the women's tournament at the 1980 Summer Olympics. During the Olympics she was one of the star members of India's hockey team which also included the Saini sisters and Prem Maya Sonir where they defeated Austria and Poland. They came fourth missing out on a bronze medal.
