= Małgorzata Lipska =

Polish field hockey player

Personal information
- Nationality: Polish
- Born: 5 December 1963 (age 62) Brzeg, Poland

Sport
- Sport: Field hockey

Małgorzata Lipska (born 5 December 1963) is a Polish field hockey player. She competed in the women's tournament at the 1980 Summer Olympics.
