= Wiesława Ryłko =

Polish hockey player

Personal information
- Nationality: Polish
- Born: 7 June 1957 (age 68) Wrocław, Poland

Sport
- Sport: Field hockey

Wiesława Ryłko (born 7 June 1957) is a Polish field hockey player. She competed in the women's tournament at the 1980 Summer Olympics.
