= Lucyna Siejka =

Polish field hockey player

Personal information
- Nationality: Polish
- Born: 10 September 1962 (age 63) Ruda Śląska, Poland

Sport
- Sport: Field hockey

Lucyna Siejka (born 10 September 1962) is a former Polish field hockey player. She represented Poland at the 1980 Summer Olympics in Moscow, where she played in all five matches of the women's tournament.
