= Skoroszyce =

- Village
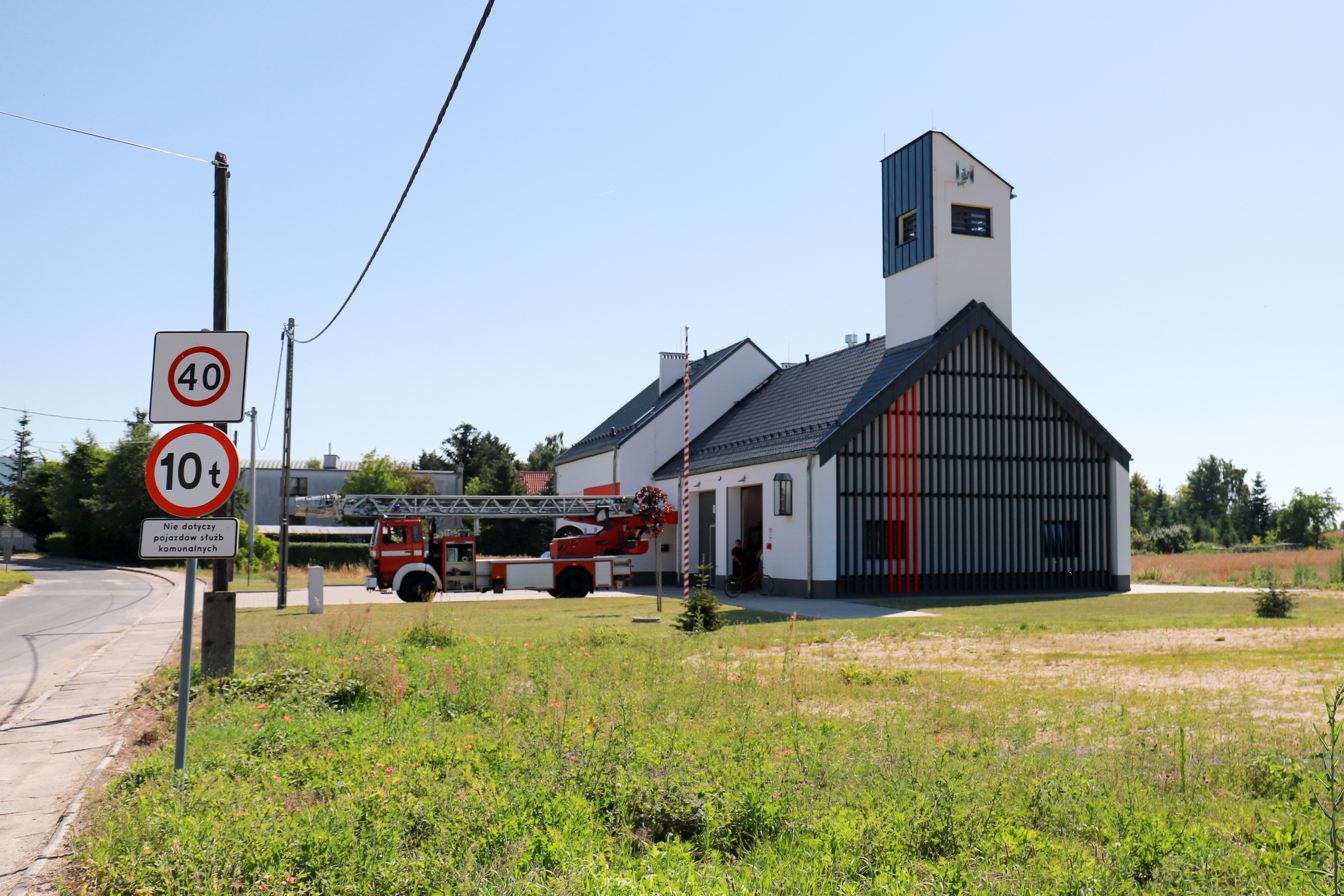
- Fire station

- Location within Poland
- Coordinates: 50°35′51″N 17°23′3″E
- Country: Poland
- Voivodeship: Opole
- County: Nysa
- Gmina: Skoroszyce
- Population: 1,400

Skoroszyce [skɔrɔˈʂɨt͡sɛ] (German: Friedewalde) is a village in Nysa County, Opole Voivodeship, in south-western Poland. It is the seat of the gmina (administrative district) called Gmina Skoroszyce.
