= Austria at the 1980 Summer Olympics =

- IOC code: AUT
- NOC: Austrian Olympic Committee

in Moscow
- Competitors: 83 (64 men and 19 women) in 16 sports
- Flag bearer: Karl Ferstl
- Medals Ranked 21st: Gold 1 Silver 2 Bronze 1 Total 4

Summer Olympics appearances (overview)
- 1896; 1900; 1904; 1908; 1912; 1920; 1924; 1928; 1932; 1936; 1948; 1952; 1956; 1960; 1964; 1968; 1972; 1976; 1980; 1984; 1988; 1992; 1996; 2000; 2004; 2008; 2012; 2016; 2020; 2024

Other related appearances
- 1906 Intercalated Games

Austria competed at the 1980 Summer Olympics in Moscow, USSR. 83 competitors, 64 men and 19 women, took part in 51 events in 16 sports.

== Medalists ==
Medal	Name	Sport	Event
Gold	Elisabeth Theurer; Mon Cherie	Equestrian	Individual Dressage
Silver	Wolfgang Mayrhofer	Sailing	Men's Finn Individual Competition
Silver	Hubert Raudaschl; Karl Ferstl	Sailing	Star Team Competition (mixed)
Bronze	Gerhard Petritsch	Shooting	25m Rapid Fire Pistol (60 shots)

== Archery ==
In its second appearance in archery competition at the Olympics, Austria again entered only one man.

Men's Individual Competition:

- Peter Mitterer — 2336 points (→ 21st place)

== Athletics ==
Men's 1,500 metres

- Robert Nemeth
  - Heat — 3:38.3
  - Semifinals — 3:40.8 (→ did not advance)

Men's 5,000 metres

- Dietmar Millonig
  - Heat — 13:45.7
  - Semi Final — 13:29.4
  - Final — 13:23.3 (→ 6th place)

Men's Marathon

- Josef Steiner
  - Final — 2:24:24 (→ 39th place)

Men's 3,000 m Steeplechase

- Wolfgang Konrad
  - Heat — 8:35.3
  - Semifinals — 8:25.0 (→ did not advance)

Men's 20 km Walk

- Martin Toporek
  - Final — 1:44:56.0 (→ 21st place)
- Johann Siegele
  - Final — 1:45:17.8 (→ 22nd place)
- Wilfried Siegele
  - Final — DSQ (→ no ranking)

Men's Long Jump

- William Rea
  - Qualification — 7.74 m (→ did not advance)

Men's Decathlon

- Georg Werthner
  - Final — 8050 points (→ 4th place)
- Sepp Zeilbauer
  - Final — 8007 points (→ 5th place)

== Cycling ==
Six cyclists represented Austria in 1980.

Individual road race

- Herbert Spindler
- Johann Traxler
- Johann Lienhart
- Kurt Zellhofer

Team time trial

- Johann Lienhart
- Peter Muckenhuber
- Herbert Spindler
- Johann Summer

== Diving ==
Men's Springboard

- Niki Stajković
  - Preliminary Round — 521.04 points (→ 12th place, did not advance)
- Kenneth Grove
  - Heats — 491.94 points (→ 15th place, did not advance)
- Michael Worisch
  - Preliminary Round — 452.43 points (→ 21st place, did not advance)

Men's Platform

- Niki Stajković
  - Preliminary Round — 493.89 points (→ 7th place)
  - Final — 725.145 points (→ 8th place)
- Kenneth Grove
  - Preliminary Round — 447.12 points (→ 12th place, did not advance)

== Hockey ==
=== Women's team competition ===
- Preliminary Round Robin
  - Lost to India (0–2)
  - Defeated Soviet Union (2–0)
  - Defeated Poland (3–0)
  - Lost to Czechoslovakia (0–5)
  - Lost to Zimbabwe (1–4) → 5th place
- Team Roster:
  - Patricia Lorenz
  - Sabine Blemenschütz
  - Elisabeth Pistauer
  - Andrea Kozma
  - Brigitta Pecanka
  - Brigitte Kindler
  - Friederike Stern
  - Regina Lorenz
  - Eleonore Pecanka
  - Ilse Stipanovsky
  - Andrea Porsch
  - Erika Csar
  - Dorit Ganster
  - Ulrike Kleinhansl
  - Eva Cambal
  - Jana Cejpek

== Modern pentathlon ==
Two male pentathletes represented Austria in 1980.

Individual Competition:

- Alexander Topay — 4784 points (→ 35th place)
- Helmut Wieser — 4582 points (→ 38th place)

== Sailing ==
Open

Athlete	Event	Race							Net points	Final rank
Athlete	Event	1	2	3	4	5	6	7	Net points	Final rank
Wolfgang Mayrhofer	Flying Dutchman	1	6	7	~~11~~	2	2	10	46.7	Silver medal
Hubert Porkert; Hermann Kupfner	Tornado	2	7	6	~~RET~~	7	7	8	67.7	7
Hubert Raudaschl; Karl Ferstl	Star	1	4	~~DSQ~~	3	2	1	9	31.7	Silver medal

== Shooting ==
Open

Athlete	Event	Final	
Athlete	Event	Score	Rank
Heinrich Münzberger	Trap	188	14
Gerhard Petritsch	25 m rapid fire pistol	596	Bronze medal
Hannes Rainer	50 m rifle prone	593	20
Nikolaus Reinprecht	Trap	187	18
Hermann Sailer	25 m rapid fire pistol	588	19
Franz Schitzhofer	Skeet	191	24
Nicky Szapáry	Skeet	194	16
Wolfram Waibel, Sr.	50 m rifle three positions	1140	24
Wolfram Waibel, Sr.	50 m rifle prone	592	25

== Swimming ==
Men's 100m Freestyle

- Herwig Bayer
  - Heats — 52.79 (→ did not advance, 22nd place)

Men's 100m Backstroke

- Herwig Bayer
  - Heats — (→ did not advance, 20th place)

Men's 100m Butterfly

- Kurt Dittrich
  - Heats — (→ did not advance, 21st place)

Women's 100m Freestyle

- Heidi Koch
  - Heats — (→ did not advance, 19th place)

Women's 100m Backstroke

- Marianne Humpelstetter
  - Heats — (→ did not advance, 21st place)

Women's 100m Butterfly

- Sonja Hausladen
  - Heats — (→ 16th place)

Women's 200m Butterfly

- Sonja Hausladen
  - Heats — (→ 12th place)
