= Denmark at the 1980 Summer Olympics =

- Flag of the Olympic Movement
- IOC code: DEN
- NOC: Danish Olympic Committee

in Moscow
- Competitors: 58 (55 men and 3 women) in 13 sports
- Flag bearers: Jørgen Lindhardsen (opening); Hans Kjeld Rasmussen (closing)
- Medals Ranked 16th: Gold 2 Silver 1 Bronze 2 Total 5

Summer Olympics appearances (overview)
- 1896; 1900; 1904; 1908; 1912; 1920; 1924; 1928; 1932; 1936; 1948; 1952; 1956; 1960; 1964; 1968; 1972; 1976; 1980; 1984; 1988; 1992; 1996; 2000; 2004; 2008; 2012; 2016; 2020; 2024

Other related appearances
- 1906 Intercalated Games

Denmark competed at the 1980 Summer Olympics in Moscow, USSR. In partial support of the American-led boycott of the 1980 Summer Olympics, Denmark competed under the Olympic Flag instead of its national flag. 58 competitors, 55 men and 3 women, took part in 30 events in 13 sports.

== Medalists ==
=== Gold ===
- Hans Kjeld Rasmussen — Shooting, Men's Skeet
- Valdemar Bandolowski, Erik Hansen and Poul Richard Høj Jensen — Sailing, Men's Soling

=== Silver ===
- Peter Due and Per Kjærgaard — Sailing, Men's Tornado

=== Bronze ===
- Hans-Henrik Ørsted — Cycling, Men's 4.000 metres Individual Pursuit
- Susanne Nielsson — Swimming, Women's 100 metres Breaststroke

== Athletics ==
Men's 400 metres

- Jens Smedegaard Hansen

Men's Marathon

- Jorn Lauenborg
  - Final — did not finish (→ no ranking)

== Boxing ==
Men's Lightweight (– 60 kg)

- Jesper Garnell
  - First Round — Defeated Sylvain Rajefiarison (Madagascar) on points (5-0)
  - Second Round — Lost to Galsandorj Batbileg (Mongolia) on points (1-4)

Men's Welterweight (– 67 kg)

- Ole Svendsen
  - First Round — Lost to Michael Pillay (Seychelles) on points (1-4)

Men's Light Heavyweight (– 81 kg)

- Michael Madsen
  - First Round — Defeated Csaba Kuzma (Hungary) on points (3-2)
  - Second Round — Lost to Ricardo Rojas (Cuba) on points (1-4)

== Canoeing ==
Men's Canadian Singles, 1,000 metres

- Hans Christian Lassen

== Cycling ==
Eleven cyclists represented Denmark in 1980.

=== Road ===
Individual road race

- Henning Jørgensen
- Verner Blaudzun
- Allan Jacobsen
- Per Sandahl Jørgensen

Team time trial

- Per Kærsgaard Laursen
- Michael Markussen
- Jesper Worre
- Jørgen V. Pedersen

=== Track ===
Sprint

- Henrik Salée

1000m time trial

- Bjarne Sørensen

Individual pursuit

- Hans-Henrik Ørsted

== Diving ==
Men's Platform

- Claus Thomsen

== Fencing ==
Women's foil

- Max Madsen

== Handball ==
=== Men's team competition ===
- Preliminary Round (Group A)
  - Defeated Cuba (30-18)
  - Lost to Spain (19-20)
  - Lost to Poland (12-26)
  - Lost to Hungary (15-16)
  - Lost to East Germany (20-24)
- Classification Match
  - 9th/10th place: Defeated Algeria (28-20) → 9th place
- Team Roster
  - Ole Nørskov Sørensen
  - Michael Jørn Berg
  - Andres Dahl-Nielsen
  - Thomas Pazyj
  - Bjarne Jeppesen
  - Iver Grunnet
  - Morten Stig Christensen
  - Carsten Haurum
  - Palle Jensen
  - Erik Bue Pedersen
  - Hans Henrik Hattesen
  - Mogens Jeppesen
  - Poul Kjaer Poulsen
  - Per Skaarup

== Rowing ==
Men's coxless pairs

- Michael Jessen
- Erik Christiansen

Men's quadruple sculls

- Reiner Modest
- Per Rasmussen
- Morten Espersen
- Ole Bloch Jensen

Women's single sculls

- Lise Justesen

== Sailing ==
Open

Athlete	Event	Race							Net points	Final rank
Athlete	Event	1	2	3	4	5	6	7	Net points	Final rank
Lasse Hjortnes	Finn	DSQ	2	21	2	8	18	~~DNF~~	99.0	13
Jørgen Bojsen-Møller; Jacob Bojsen-Møller	Flying Dutchman	~~DSQ~~	3	6	6	6	4	3	54.5	6
Peter Due; Per Kjaergaard	Tornado	~~7~~	2	2	3	2	5	3	30.4	Silver medal
Jens Christensen; Morten Nielsen	Star	4	7	~~12~~	2	6	5	1	45.7	5
Poul Richard Høj Jensen; Valdemar Bandolowski; Erik Hansen	Soling	1	5	~~6~~	5	2	1	1	23.0	Gold medal

== Shooting ==
Open

Athlete	Event	Final	
Athlete	Event	Score	Rank
Henning Clausen	50 metre rifle three positions	1156	9
Henning Clausen	50 metre rifle prone	592	25
Finn Danielsen	50 metre rifle three positions	1147	17
Ole Justesen	Skeet	194	10
Hans Kjeld Rasmussen	Skeet	196+25+25	Gold medal

== Swimming ==
Women's 100m Breaststroke

- Susanne Nielsson
  - Heats — 1:11.58
  - Final — 1:11.16 (→ Bronze Medal)

Women's 200m Breaststroke

- Susanne Nielsson
  - Final — 2:32.75 (→ 4th place)

Women's 400m Individual Medley

- Susanne Nielsson
  - Heats — did not start (→ did not advance)

== Weightlifting ==
Men's Light Heavyweight

- Erling Johansen

== Wrestling ==
Men's Welterweight, Greco-Roman

- Kaj Jægergaard Hansen

Men's Heavyweight, Greco-Roman

- Svend Erik Studsgaard
