= Shooting at the 1980 Summer Olympics – Mixed 50 metre rifle prone =

Sports shooting at the Olympics

Mixed 50 metre rifle, prone at the Games of the XXII Olympiad
- Venue: Moscow, Soviet Union
- Date: 21 July 1980
- Competitors: 56 from 32 nations

Medalists
1st place, gold medalist(s)		Károly Varga	Hungary
2nd place, silver medalist(s)		Hellfried Heilfort	East Germany
3rd place, bronze medalist(s)		Petar Zapryanov	Bulgaria

The mixed 50 metre rifle, prone was a shooting sports event held as part of the Shooting at the 1980 Summer Olympics programme. It was the fourteenth appearance of the event. The competition was held on 21 July 1980 at the shooting ranges in Moscow. 56 shooters from 32 nations competed. Gold medallist Károly Varga broke his shooting hand in a football match two days before the competition started, and had to wear a bandage over it when competing. He said that the injury actually helped him, because he was forced to squeeze the trigger more delicately. The event was technically mixed, although no women competed. Mixed events were abolished after 1980, with women-only events being introduced instead.

== Results ==
Place	Shooter	Total
1	Károly Varga (HUN)	599
2	Hellfried Heilfort (GDR)	599
3	Petar Zapryanov (BUL)	598
4	Krzysztof Stefaniak (POL)	598
5	Timo Hagman (FIN)	597
6	Aleksandr Mastyanin (URS)	597
7	Nonka Matova (BUL)	597
8	Walter Frescura (ITA)	597
9	Odette Meuter (BEL)	597
10	Piotr Kosmatko (POL)	596
11T	Oleksandr Bulkin (URS)	596
11T	Yvonne Hill (AUS)	596
11T	Mircea Ilca (ROU)	596
11T	Roland Jacoby (LUX)	596
15T	David Hollister (AUS)	595
15T	Zdravko Milutinović (YUG)	595
15T	Adelso Peña (CUB)	595
18T	Ferenc Szilágyi (HUN)	594
18T	Sven Johansson (SWE)	594
20T	Mario Gonsierowski (GDR)	593
20T	Adolf Jakeš (TCH)	593
20T	Kim Jun-sop (PRK)	593
20T	Hannes Rainer (AUT)	593
20T	Stefan Thynell (SWE)	593
25T	Juan Casamajo (ESP)	592
25T	Henning Clausen (DEN)	592
25T	Durval Guimarães (BRA)	592
25T	Dennis Hardman (ZIM)	592
25T	Kim Gyong-Ho (PRK)	592
25T	Jyrki Lehtonen (FIN)	592
25T	Wolfram Waibel, Sr. (AUT)	592
32T	José Luis Calvo (ESP)	591
32T	Waldemar Capucci (BRA)	591
32T	Gilbert Hoef (BEL)	591
32T	Amera Khalif (JOR)	591
32T	Athanasios Papageorgiou (GRE)	591
32T	Jiří Vogler (TCH)	591
38T	Sangidorjiin Adilbish (MGL)	590
38T	Oscar Caceres (PER)	590
38T	Gian Chand (IND)	590
38T	Miguel Valdes (CUB)	590
42T	José Álvarez (MEX)	589
42T	Justo Moreno (PER)	589
44T	Roy Choudhury (IND)	588
44T	Lê Minh Hiển (VIE)	588
44T	Christiaan van Velzen (NED)	588
47	Srecko Pejovic (YUG)	587
48T	Mendbayaryn Jantsankhorloo (MGL)	583
48T	Nguyễn Tiến Trung (VIE)	583
48T	Pier Paolo Taddei (SMR)	583
51	Mohamed Jbour (JOR)	579
52	Alfredo Pelliccioni (SMR)	577
53	Roger Cartín (CRC)	570
54	Mauricio Alvarado (CRC)	560
55	Khamseua Bounheuang (LAO)	556
56	Hath (LAO)	546
