= Shooting at the 1980 Summer Olympics – Mixed skeet =

Sports shooting at the Olympics

Men's skeet at the Games of the XXII Olympiad
- Venue: Dynamo Shooting Range
- Date: 24–26 July 1980
- Competitors: 46 from 26 nations

Medalists
1st place, gold medalist(s)		Kjeld Rasmussen	Denmark
2nd place, silver medalist(s)		Lars-Göran Carlsson	Sweden
3rd place, bronze medalist(s)		Roberto Castrillo	Cuba

The men's skeet shooting competition at the 1980 Summer Olympics was held on 24 July until 26 July at the Dynamo Shooting Range in Moscow, Russian SFSR, Soviet Union. Five shooters tied for first with 196, with the three medalists tying with a 25 possible in the shoot-off. Kjeld Rasmussen shot another possible 25 in the second shoot-off to win the gold medal over Lars-Göran Carlsson (silver) and Roberto Castrillo (bronze).

== Result ==
Rank	Athlete Name	Country	1	2	3	4	5	6	7	8	Total
1	Kjeld Rasmussen	Denmark	25	25	25	25	23	25	25	23	196
2	Lars-Göran Carlsson	Sweden	25	24	25	25	24	24	24	25	196
3	Roberto Castrillo	Cuba	24	25	25	24	25	25	25	23	196
4	Pavel Pulda	Czechoslovakia	25	24	24	25	24	25	25	24	196
5	Celso Giardini	Italy	25	24	25	25	25	25	23	24	196
6	Guillermo Alfredo Torres	Cuba	25	24	24	25	25	25	23	24	195
7	Francisco Pérez	Spain	24	25	25	25	25	25	22	24	195
8	Ari Westergård	Finland	25	24	25	24	25	25	24	23	195
9	Tamaz Imnaishvili	Soviet Union	25	24	25	25	24	25	24	23	195
10	Ole Justesen	Denmark	25	23	23	25	24	25	24	25	194
11	Rodolfos Alexakos	Greece	24	24	24	24	24	25	24	25	194
12	Julio Jesús de las Casas	Venezuela	25	24	23	24	25	25	24	24	194
13	Josef Panacek	Czechoslovakia	25	25	25	22	25	24	25	23	194
14	Johannes Pierik	Netherlands	24	24	25	24	25	25	23	24	194
15	Aleksandr Sokolov	Soviet Union	25	24	25	24	24	25	23	24	194
16	Nikolaus Szapáry	Austria	24	24	24	24	25	24	25	24	194
17	István Talabos	Hungary	24	24	25	24	24	24	25	24	194
18	Kees van Ieperen	Netherlands	25	25	25	23	24	25	22	25	194
19	Wiesław Gawlikowski	Poland	24	25	24	24	24	24	25	22	192
20	Bernhard Hochwald	East Germany	24	25	24	24	23	24	24	24	192
21	Anton Manolov	Bulgaria	25	24	25	24	22	24	23	25	192
22	Ioan Toman	Romania	24	25	24	24	25	23	24	23	192
23	Tibor Gosztola	Hungary	24	25	24	24	24	23	23	24	191
24	Franz Schitzhofer	Austria	25	25	23	25	23	24	23	23	191
25	Juan Giha	Peru	25	23	24	23	23	24	24	24	190
26	Enrique Camarena	Spain	25	23	24	23	23	22	25	24	189
27	Francisco Romero Arribas	Guatemala	23	25	24	24	23	25	21	24	189
28	Juan Bueno	Mexico	23	22	24	25	24	23	24	23	188
29	Romano Garagnani	Italy	24	25	22	24	24	22	24	23	188
30	Kim Jun-ho	North Korea	24	24	21	25	24	24	23	23	188
31	Hubert Pawłowski	Poland	23	23	24	22	25	24	24	23	188
32	Albert Thompson	Ireland	23	23	23	23	23	24	24	24	187
33	Jeremy Cole	Zimbabwe	23	24	22	24	25	20	23	24	185
34	Kim Hwa-jong	North Korea	22	24	23	23	25	23	23	22	185
35	Juan Lavieri	Venezuela	25	23	23	21	21	25	22	25	185
36	Mario-Oscar Zachrisson	Guatemala	24	23	23	23	24	22	23	23	185
37	Kiril Gechevski	Bulgaria	21	24	22	24	24	24	24	23	184
38	Manne Johnson	Sweden	22	23	24	22	22	24	24	23	184
39	Petros Pappas	Greece	21	25	21	24	22	23	25	23	184
40	Walter Perón	Peru	23	21	24	23	23	22	22	23	181
41	Nick Cooney	Ireland	22	24	23	24	23	20	22	22	180
42	Axel Krämer	East Germany	24	22	24	22	23	23	18	23	179
43	Richard Gardner	Zimbabwe	23	22	23	22	20	23	21	23	177
44	Alvaro Guardia	Costa Rica	21	23	21	17	24	24	22	24	176
45	Jihad Naim	Syria	23	23	24	21	20	23	22	20	176
46	Khalil Arbaji	Syria	21	22	22	22	21	23	18	23	172

=== Shoot-off ===
Rank	Athlete Name	Country	SO1	SO2
1	Kjeld Rasmussen	Denmark	25	25
2	Lars-Göran Carlsson	Sweden	25	24
3	Roberto Castrillo	Cuba	25	23
4	Pavel Pulda	Czechoslovakia	24	
5	Celso Giardini	Italy	24	

== Sources ==
- Official Report of the Organising Committee of the Games of the XXII Olympiad. Moscow. 1981. p. 543.
