= Shooting at the 1980 Summer Olympics – Mixed 50 metre rifle three positions =

Sports shooting at the Olympics

Mixed 50 metre rifle three positions at the Games of the XXII Olympiad
- Venue: Dynamo Shooting Range
- Date: 23 July 1980
- Competitors: 39 from 21 nations

Medalists
| 1st place, gold medalist(s) | | Viktor Vlasov | Soviet Union |
| 2nd place, silver medalist(s) | | Bernd Hartstein | East Germany |
| 3rd place, bronze medalist(s) | | Sven Johansson | Sweden |

The mixed 50 metre rifle three positions shooting competition at the 1980 Summer Olympics was held on 23 July at the Dynamo Shooting Range in Moscow, Soviet Union. The gold medal went to Soviet Viktor Vlasov, who broke the world record with 1,173.

== Results ==
| Rank | Athlete | Country | PP | KP | SP | Total | Notes |
|---|---|---|---|---|---|---|---|
| 1st place, gold medalist(s) | Viktor Vlasov | Soviet Union | 398 | 397 | 378 | 1,173 | WR |
| 2nd place, silver medalist(s) | Bernd Hartstein | East Germany | 399 | 393 | 374 | 1,166 | |
| 3rd place, bronze medalist(s) | Sven Johansson | Sweden | 398 | 388 | 379 | 1,165 | |
| 4 | Mauri Röppänen | Finland | 397 | 388 | 379 | 1,164 | |
| 5 | Aleksandr Mitrofanov | Soviet Union | 397 | 389 | 378 | 1,164 | |
| 6 | Nonka Matova | Bulgaria | 396 | 380 | 377 | 1,163 | |
| 7 | Hellfried Heilfort | East Germany | 394 | 390 | 378 | 1,162 | |
| 8 | Eugeniusz Pędzisz | Poland | 397 | 391 | 368 | 1,156 | |
| 9 | Henning Clausen | Denmark | 400 | 390 | 366 | 1,156 | |
| 10 | István Mátrai | Hungary | 397 | 387 | 371 | 1,155 | |
| =11 | Éva Fórián | Hungary | 394 | 386 | 373 | 1,153 | |
| =11 | Kim Dong-gil | North Korea | 396 | 386 | 371 | 1,153 | |
| =11 | Romuald Semionow | Poland | 395 | 388 | 370 | 1,153 | |
| =11 | Ri Ho-jun | North Korea | 390 | 384 | 379 | 1,153 | |
| 15 | Stefan Thynell | Sweden | 396 | 385 | 369 | 1,150 | |
| 16 | Miguel Valdes | Cuba | 398 | 383 | 367 | 1,148 | |
| =17 | Finn Danielsen | Denmark | 393 | 389 | 365 | 1,147 | |
| =17 | Srečko Pejović | Yugoslavia | 390 | 385 | 372 | 1,147 | |
| 19 | Timo Hagman | Finland | 394 | 385 | 367 | 1,146 | |
| 20 | Adelso Peña | Cuba | 398 | 384 | 362 | 1,144 | |
| 21 | Zdravko Milutinović | Yugoslavia | 395 | 376 | 372 | 1,143 | |
| =22 | Jaroslav Pekař | Czechoslovakia | 394 | 382 | 366 | 1,142 | |
| =22 | Emiliyan Yankov | Bulgaria | 396 | 381 | 365 | 1,142 | |
| =24 | Adolf Jakeš | Czechoslovakia | 397 | 386 | 357 | 1,140 | |
| =24 | Wolfram Waibel, Sr. | Austria | 398 | 380 | 362 | 1,140 | |
| 26 | Mohamed Jbour | Jordan | 393 | 380 | 365 | 1,138 | |
| 27 | Sangidorjiin Adilbish | Mongolia | 392 | 380 | 363 | 1,135 | |
| 28 | Justo Moreno | Peru | 391 | 379 | 363 | 1,133 | |
| 29 | Nguyễn Tiến Trung | Vietnam | 397 | 378 | 347 | 1,122 | |
| =30 | Oscar Caceres | Peru | 395 | 376 | 346 | 1,117 | |
| =30 | Dennis Hardman | Zimbabwe | 390 | 378 | 349 | 1,117 | |
| =32 | Mendbayaryn Jantsankhorloo | Mongolia | 392 | 373 | 339 | 1,104 | |
| =32 | Amera Khalif | Jordan | 395 | 365 | 344 | 1,104 | |
| 34 | Roland Jacoby | Luxembourg | 394 | 369 | 336 | 1,099 | |
| 35 | Nghiêm Văn Sẩn | Vietnam | 389 | 368 | 337 | 1,094 | |
| 36 | Francesco Nanni | San Marino | 383 | 366 | 344 | 1,093 | |
| 37 | Pasquale Raschi | San Marino | 386 | 362 | 333 | 1,081 | |
| 38 | Mauricio Alvarado | Costa Rica | 385 | 345 | 327 | 1,057 | |
| 39 | Roger Cartín | Costa Rica | 381 | 347 | 294 | 1,022 | |
