= Shooting at the 1980 Summer Olympics =

Shooting at the Games of the XXII Olympiad
- Venue: Dynamo Shooting Range
- Dates: 20–26 July 1980

Shooting at the 1980 Summer Olympics took place at the Dynamo Shooting Range in Mytishchi in eastern part of Moscow between 20 and 26 July. Seven events were contested. Although events were mixed, i.e. open to both men and women, all medals were swept by men, and there were only 5 women competing compared to 77 in Los Angeles 1984, which introduced separate female events.

== Medal summary ==
Rank	Nation	Gold	Silver	Bronze	Total
1	Soviet Union	3	1	1	5
2	Denmark	1	0	0	1
2	Hungary	1	0	0	1
2	Italy	1	0	0	1
2	Romania	1	0	0	1
6	East Germany	0	5	1	6
7	Sweden	0	1	1	2
8	Bulgaria	0	0	2	2
9	Austria	0	0	1	1
9	Cuba	0	0	1	1
Totals (10 entries)		7	7	7	21

=== Events ===
Games	Gold	Silver	Bronze
25 m rapid fire pistol	Corneliu Ion; Romania	Jürgen Wiefel; East Germany	Gerhard Petritsch; Austria
50 m pistol	Aleksandr Melentyev; Soviet Union	Harald Vollmar; East Germany	Lyubcho Dyakov; Bulgaria
50 m rifle prone	Károly Varga; Hungary	Hellfried Heilfort; East Germany	Petar Zapryanov; Bulgaria
50 m rifle three positions	Viktor Vlasov; Soviet Union	Bernd Hartstein; East Germany	Sven Johansson; Sweden
50 m running target	Igor Sokolov; Soviet Union	Thomas Pfeffer; East Germany	Aleksandr Gazov; Soviet Union
Skeet	Kjeld Rasmussen; Denmark	Lars-Göran Carlsson; Sweden	Roberto Castrillo; Cuba
Trap	Luciano Giovannetti; Italy	Rustam Yambulatov; Soviet Union	Jörg Damme; East Germany

== Participating nations ==
A total of 239 shooters, 234 men and 5 women, from 38 nations competed at the Moscow Games:

- Andorra (2)
- Australia (2)
- Austria (8)
- Belgium (3)
- Brazil (5)
- Bulgaria (11)
- Costa Rica (6)
- Cuba (5)
- Czechoslovakia (11)
- Denmark (4)
- East Germany (13)
- Finland (9)
- Greece (3)
- Guatemala (5)
- Hungary (14)
- India (4)
- Ireland (4)
- Italy (10)
- Jordan (4)
- Laos (6)
- Luxembourg (1)
- Malta (2)
- Mexico (2)
- Mongolia (2)
- Netherlands (4)
- North Korea (11)
- Peru (7)
- Poland (12)
- Romania (5)
- San Marino (10)
- Soviet Union (14)
- Spain (8)
- Sweden (8)
- Syria (4)
- Venezuela (2)
- Vietnam (7)
- Yugoslavia (3)
- Zimbabwe (8)
