= Casamajo =

Casamajo is a surname of Catalan-language origin. Notable people with the surname include:

- Carles Puigdemont i Casamajó (born 1962), Catalan nationalist politician and journalist
- Juan Casamajo (born 1945), Spanish sports shooter
