= Aleksandr Mastyanin =

Soviet sports shooter

Personal information
- Nationality: Soviet
- Born: 28 November 1952
- Died: 28 May 2020 (aged 67)

Sport
- Sport: Sports shooting

Aleksandr Mastyanin (28 November 1952 – 28 May 2020) was a Soviet sports shooter. He competed in the mixed 50 metre rifle prone event at the 1980 Summer Olympics.
