= Ferenc Szilágyi =

Hungarian sports shooter

Personal information
- Nationality: Hungarian
- Born: 13 December 1952 (age 72); Pásztó, Hungary

Sport
- Sport: Sports shooting

Ferenc Szilágyi (born 13 December 1952) is a Hungarian sports shooter. He competed in the mixed 50 metre rifle prone event at the 1980 Summer Olympics.
