= Albert Thompson (sport shooter) =

Irish sports shooter

Personal information
- Nationality: Irish
- Born: 15 February 1952 (age 74) Lisburn, Northern Ireland

Sport
- Sport: Sports shooting

Albert Thompson (born 15 February 1952) is an Irish sports shooter. He competed in the mixed skeet event at the 1980 Summer Olympics. Originally from Lisburn in Northern Ireland, he also represented Ireland in the men's mixed skeet event at the 1984 Summer Olympics.
