= Khleif Ayyat =

Jordanian sports shooter (1929–2022)

Personal information
- Full name: Khleif Ayyat Al-Issa
- National team: Jordan
- Born: December 1, 1929; Mafraq, Jordan
- Died: September 5, 2022 (aged 92)
- Height: 167 cm (5 ft 6 in)
- Weight: 59 kg (130 lb)

Sport
- Country: Jordan
- Sport: Shooting
- Updated on 4 May 2021

Khalif Ayyat Al-Issa (Arabic: خليف عياط العيسى; December 1, 1929 – September 5, 2022) was a Jordanian Olympic sports shooter. He won the World Military Shooting Championship in 1979. He represented Jordan at the 1980 Summer Olympics in Moscow. Ayyat died on September 5, 2022, at the age of 92.

He worked in the army from 1947 to 1984. He took part in the 1948 and 1967 wars. At the end of his caree his rank was lieutenant colonel. During his career he worked for years for the Military Sports Federation. He is described as “veteran pioneer” in his country.

== Olympic participation ==
=== Moscow 1980 ===
Khleif was the oldest participant for Jordan in that tournament aged 50 years and 235 days by the start of the tournament. He competed in both mixed 50 metre rifle prone and mixed 50 metre rifle three positions events.

Mixed 50 metre rifle prone

he finished 32nd out of 56 competitor.

Rank	Shooter	Total
32T	Khleif Ayyat (JOR)	591

Mixed 50 metre rifle three positions

he finished 32nd out of 39 competitor.

Rank	Shooter	PP	KP	SP	Total
32T	Khleif Ayyat (JOR)	395	365	344	1,104
