= István Mátrai =

Hungarian sports shooter

Personal information
- Nationality: Hungarian
- Born: 12 November 1949 (age 75); Budapest, Hungary

Sport
- Sport: Sports shooting

István Mátrai (born 12 November 1949) is a Hungarian sports shooter. He competed in the mixed 50 metre rifle three positions event at the 1980 Summer Olympics.
