= Stefaniak =

Stefaniak is a Polish surname. It may refer to:

- Bill Stefaniak, Australian politician
- Józef Stefaniak, Polish ice hockey player
- Krzysztof Stefaniak, Polish sports shooter
- Marvin Stefaniak, German footballer
- Mary Helen Stefaniak, American writer
