= Oleksandr Bulkin =

Soviet sports shooter

Personal information
- Nationality: Soviet
- Born: 25 September 1959 (age 65)

Sport
- Sport: Sports shooting

Oleksandr Bulkin (born 25 September 1959) is a Soviet sports shooter. He competed in the mixed 50 metre rifle prone event at the 1980 Summer Olympics.
