= David Hollister (sport shooter) =

Australian sports shooter

Personal information
- Nationality: Australian
- Born: 16 October 1944
- Died: 25 July 2019 (aged 74)

Sport
- Sport: Sports shooting

David Hollister (16 October 1944 – 25 July 2019) was an Australian sports shooter. He competed in the mixed 50 metre rifle prone event at the 1980 Summer Olympics.
