= Hartstein =

Hartstein is a surname. Notable people with the surname include:

- Bernd Hartstein (1947–2002), German sport shooter
- Gary Hartstein (born 1955), American professor of Anesthesia and Emergency Medicine
- Roy Hart (performer) (born Rubin Hartstein; 1926–1975), South African actor
- Roy S. Harte, né Hartstein, (1924–2003), American jazz drummer
