= Piotr Kosmatko =

Polish sports shooter

Personal information
- Nationality: Polish
- Born: 22 April 1952 (age 72); Warsaw, Poland

Sport
- Sport: Sports shooting

Piotr Kosmatko (born 22 April 1952) is a Polish sports shooter. He competed in the mixed 50 metre rifle prone event at the 1980 Summer Olympics.
