= Nghiêm Văn Sẩn =

Vietnamese sports shooter (born 1940)

Personal information
- Nationality: Vietnamese
- Born: 10 May 1940 (age 84)

Sport
- Sport: Sports shooting

Nghiêm Văn Sẩn (born 10 May 1940) is a Vietnamese sports shooter. He competed in the mixed 50 metre rifle three positions event at the 1980 Summer Olympics. He was the coach of the national team.
