= Tibor Gosztola =

Hungarian sports shooter

Personal information
- Nationality: Hungarian
- Born: 29 May 1961 (age 63); Budapest, Hungary

Sport
- Sport: Sports shooting

Tibor Gosztola (born 29 May 1961) is a Hungarian sports shooter. He competed in the mixed skeet event at the 1980 Summer Olympics.
