= Lehtonen =

Lehtonen is a Finnish surname of Virtanen type derived from the word lehto, "grove". Notable people with the surname include:

- Aatos Lehtonen (1914–2005), Finnish footballer and football manager
- Aleksi Lehtonen (1891–1951), Finnish archbishop
- Antero Lehtonen (born 1954), Finnish ice hockey player
- Antti Lehtonen (born 1993), Finnish ice hockey player
- Eero Lehtonen (1898–1959), Finnish pentathlete
- Eira Lehtonen (1939–1984), Finnish gymnast
- Erkki Lehtonen (born 1957), Finnish ice hockey player
- Eva Lehtonen (born 1991), Finnish swimmer
- Frans Lehtonen (1859–1920), Finnish blacksmith and politician
- Henri Lehtonen (born 1980), Finnish footballer
- Jani Lehtonen (1968–2008), Finnish pole vaulter
- Janne Lehtonen (born 1983), Finnish entrepreneur, firefighter, and former Special Operation Forces soldier
- Joel Lehtonen (1881–1934), Finnish author, translator, critic and journalist
- Joel Lehtonen (footballer) (born 1999), Finnish footballer
- Joni Lehtonen (born 1973), Finnish football coach and former player
- Juho Lehtonen (born 1992), Finnish footballer
- Jukka Lehtonen (born 1982), Finnish volleyball player
- Jyrki Lehtonen (born 1948), Finnish sports shooter
- Kari Lehtonen (born 1983), Finnish professional ice hockey goaltender
- Kati Lehtonen (born 1975), Finnish cross-country skier
- Kyösti Lehtonen (1931–1987), Finnish Greco-Roman wrestler
- Lahja Lehtonen (1927–2016), Finnish missionary
- Lari Lehtonen (born 1987), Finnish cross-country skier
- Marja Lehtonen (born 1968), Finnish professional female bodybuilder and personal trainer
- Mikko Lehtonen, several people
- Mirja Lehtonen (1942–2009), Finnish cross-country skier
- Oskari Lehtonen (1889–1964), Finnish lawyer, bank director and politician
- Pertti Lehtonen (born 1956), Finnish ice hockey player
- Riikka Lehtonen (born 1979), Finnish volleyball player
- Samuel Lehtonen (1921–2010), Finnish Lutheran bishop
- Sauli Lehtonen (1975–1995), Finnish tango singer
- Venla Lehtonen (born 1995), Finnish biathlete

As the ending -nen in Finnish last names refers to a diminutive or in common language to something very small like a leaflet as the -nen ending transfers to -let ending and as the start of the surname means a grove in English, in theory unofficially the surname would mean Grovelet in English; a very small grove. But as a word grovelet does not exist in Finnish language as term that people use to refer to a small grove beyond the surname itself so the term would be only used to refer to a person with the surname, it would be smart just to stay on the level of just in theory. Beyond the surname itself a -nen diminutive ending to a surname is one of the most common type of surnames in Finland such as Virtanen, Kekkonen, Korhonen.
