= Manne Johnson =

Swedish sports shooter

Personal information
- Nationality: Swedish
- Born: 24 March 1944 (age 81); Varberg, Sweden

Sport
- Sport: Sports shooting

Manne Johnson (born 24 March 1944) is a Swedish sports shooter. He competed in the mixed skeet event at the 1980 Summer Olympics.
