= Athanasios Papageorgiou =

Athanasios Papageorgiou may refer to:

- Thanasis Papageorgiou (born 1987), Greek footballer
- Athanasios Papageorgiou (archaeologist) (1931–2022), Cypriot archaeologist
- Athanasios Papageorgiou (sport shooter) (born 1958), Greek sports shooter
