= Mario Gonsierowski =

German sports shooter

Personal information
- Nationality: German
- Born: 6 July 1956 (age 68); Wilkau-Haßlau, Germany

Sport
- Sport: Sports shooting

Mario Gonsierowski (born 6 July 1956) is a German sports shooter. He competed in the mixed 50 metre rifle prone event at the 1980 Summer Olympics.
