= Grunnet =

Grunnet may refer to:

== Places ==
- Grunnet, Gotland, an island in Slite archipelago, Sweden

== People ==
- Iver Grunnet, Danish handball player
- Sarah Grunnet Stougaard, a Danish handball player
