= Lars-Göran Carlsson =

Swedish sport shooter (1949–2020)

Medal record

Men's shooting

Representing Sweden

Olympic Games
Silver medal – second place	1980 Moscow	Skeet

Lars-Göran Carlsson (July 24, 1949 – July 27, 2020) was a Swedish sport shooter who won the silver medal in the skeet shooting event at the 1980 Summer Olympics in Moscow.
