= Hubert Pawłowski =

Polish sports shooter

Personal information
- Nationality: Polish
- Born: 21 January 1956 (age 69); Warsaw, Poland

Sport
- Sport: Sports shooting

Hubert Pawłowski (born 21 January 1956) is a Polish sports shooter. He competed in the mixed skeet event at the 1980 Summer Olympics.
