= Lehkonen =

Lehkonen is a Finnish surname. Notable people with the surname include:

- Artturi Lehkonen (born 1995), Finnish professional ice hockey player
- Ismo Lehkonen (born 1962), Finnish former professional ice hockey player

== See also ==
- Lehtonen
