= Mircea Ilca =

Romanian sports shooter

Personal information
- Nationality: Romanian
- Born: 25 July 1958 (age 66); Arad, Romania

Sport
- Sport: Sports shooting

Mircea Ilca (born 25 July 1958) is a Romanian sports shooter. He competed in the mixed 50 metre rifle prone event at the 1980 Summer Olympics.
