= Athanasios Papageorgiou (sport shooter) =

Greek sports shooter

Personal information
- Nationality: Greek
- Born: 8 November 1958 (age 66); Fthiotis

Sport
- Sport: Sports shooting

Athanasios Papageorgiou (born 8 November 1958) is a Greek sports shooter. He competed in the mixed 50 metre rifle prone event at the 1980 Summer Olympics. He later became the general secretary of SKOE, the Hellenic Shooting Federation. Eventually, he was elected as the President of the Federation, a position he has held until today. Athanasios Papageorgiou is also a member of the Hellenic Olympic Committee.
