= Iver Grunnet =

Danish handball player (born 1952)

Iver Grunnet (born 9 March 1952) is a Danish former handball player who competed in the 1980 Summer Olympics. In 1980 he finished ninth with the Danish team in the Olympic tournament. He played three matches and scored three goals. In total he played 52 matches for the Danish national team scoring 58 goals.

He played club handball for the Copenhagen-based clubs Frederiksberg IF and Holte IF. With the latter he won Bronze medals in the Danish league in 1979/1980 season. He debuted for the Danish national team in October 1976 in a match against Norway.

After his playing career he was for a time the Chairperson of the Danish handball club Slagelse FH.

Grunnet was a high school teacher and principal at Slagelse Gymnasium after his playing career. He retired in 2017.

== See also ==
- Denmark at the 1980 Summer Olympics
