= Kenneth Grove =

Australian diver

Personal information
- Nationality: Australian
- Born: 24 May 1953 (age 72) Townsville, Queensland, Australia

Sport
- Country: Australia (until 1974); Austria (from 1974)
- Sport: Diving
- Event: Platform diving

Kenneth Grove (born 24 May 1953) is a former Australian competitive diver. In 1970 and 1971, he broke world records on the springboard, performing 100 and 143 different dives in each year respectively. He competed in two events at the 1972 Summer Olympics. Grove had become disillusioned by sport in Australia, citing lack of financial support and facilities compared to what other countries offered their athletes. Following an injury sustained during the trials for the 1974 British Commonwealth Games and subsequently being overlooked for the team, he left Australia at the end of 1973 and moved to Austria with his fiancee, securing a scholarship at the Vienna Sports College with a $136 monthly allowance.

After renouncing his Australian citizenship in 1975, he later became an Austrian citizen and competed for Austria at the 1980 Summer Olympics.

== Career ==
=== Australia ===
When 15, Grove won the junior 1-metre springboard and open diving titles at the New South Wales diving championships in January 1969, defeating older rivals to claim the titles. He was the first junior to win the open title in the state since Jack Barnett in 1936, who was Grove's mentor and expressed his admiration for Grove's achievement. In January 1971 at the age of 17, Grove set a state record in Sydney, Australia in a three-metre diving event, scoring 491.05 in "a near-faultless set of dives", despite suffering with an injury earlier in the week that had required stitches. The following month in February, he broke his own world record, set just the year before, by performing 143 different springboard dives in Tempe, New South Wales during their annual dive-a-thon, 43 more than the year before.

Grove competed during the 1972 Summer Olympics, an experience which was regarded as "disastrous", after twice hitting the board with his feet. During the springboard event, he hit the board with his leg which resulted in "ones" in points awarded and an eventual finishing position of 27 out of 31. During the 10-metre high-board event, Grove clipped his toes and was awarded up to just three-and-a-halves, giving him a finishing position of 32 out of 35, knocking his confidence. Prior to the competition, Grove had performed well, with a fifth placed finish behind Italian Klaus Dibiasi, a former gold medalist, while he lamented that his participation in the Olympics was "the only time in competition I have ever hit the board with my legs". Later in 1972, he won the 1-metre New South Wales title and continued his clean sweet of open event titles, all of which he had won since his first event at aged 15.

In January 1973, Grove won the men's 3-metre spring board title held at Ryde swimming centre during the New South Wales diving championships, being awarded 465.45 points to secure his 15th consecutive title. During the trials for the 1974 British Commonwealth Games, Grove tore a shoulder muscle and was forced to withdraw, after being overlooked when the team was officially announced.

Towards the end of 1973, Grove participated in the Country-versus-City diving competition, held at the Canberra Olympic Pool, following his participation in the 1973 World Diving Championships in Belgrade. He was described by the Canberra Times as being the "star attraction". In the same month and what would be his last appearance for Australia, Grove broke three records at the 1-metre diving championships in New South Wales, setting a state record of 506.95 points, 30.15 higher than the record he previously set in 1971. His victory also secured him his 19th consecutive Open State title, which officials believed would not be broken "for many years". During a forward somersault performance, one judge awarded him 8.5 points out of 10, which was the highest awarded in a single performance during the whole day's events.

=== Austria ===
Grove left Australia around the end of 1973 to move to Austria, where he joined his fiancee. He expected to spend up to five years there, diving in a new indoor complex built in Vienna. In 1975, Grove renounced his Australian citizenship and intended upon applying for citizenship in Austria, citing that sportspeople in Austria get sponsorship and good opportunities to train, as well as "all the time they need for competition with full salary". He was award a scholarship at the Vienna Sports College with a $136 monthly allowance. The opportunities afforded to elite sportspeople in Austria were in stark contrast to Australia, where it was regarded that sportspeople were "largely left to fend for themselves". In a letter to his parents announcing his decision, Grove commented that he found it "impossible" to build his career while in Australia, contrary to life in Austria where he could get "the intense medical treatment which I will be having before I start 10-metre diving again", while noting that in Austria, he had many more opportunities to reach a professional level. His experiences were not uncommon, as it was reported that Australian sportspeople were falling behind competitors in Europe due to substandard facilities and lack of financial backing.

He competed for Austria during the 1980 Summer Olympics as one of the country's two diving representatives. During his career in Australia, Grove was considered as "a known rebel" against sports bureaucracy and is one of only two Australian Olympians to compete at the Olympics for two different countries.

In 1988, Grove gave a display of trampolining at the newly opened Union Volksbank Purgstall sports hall in Purgstall an der Erlauf, where his triple somersaults were described as being "a special treat".

== Later life ==
Grove participated in the 2004 Australian Masters Championships, where he was awarded the title of "Outstanding Masters Diver of the Year". During the event in Sydney, he won a gold medal in each of the 1-metre, 3-metre and platform diving events in the men's 50-59 age category.

== Personal ==
Grove's father Jack was a leading official in the New South Wales diving association, and commenting on his son's decision to renounce his Australian citizenship, said that "it's a poor reflection on Australia that Ken can see no future in amateur sport". As well as competitive diving, Grove also was striving to become a teacher. He met his wife during the 1972 Summer Olympics, where she was working among the staff in the Olympic Village.
