= Eleonore Pecanka =

Austrian field hockey player

Personal information
- Nationality: Austrian
- Born: 27 October 1956 (age 69) Vienna, Austria

Sport
- Sport: Field hockey

Eleonore Pecanka (born 27 October 1956) is an Austrian field hockey player. She competed in the women's tournament at the 1980 Summer Olympics.
