= Alexander Topay =

Austrian modern pentathlete

Personal information
- Born: 20 August 1955 (age 70) Innsbruck, Austria

Sport
- Sport: Modern pentathlon

Alexander Topay (born 20 August 1955) is an Austrian modern pentathlete. He competed at the 1980 Summer Olympics, finishing in 35th place in the individual event.
