= Juan Casamajo =

Spanish sports shooter

Personal information
- Nationality: Spanish
- Born: 25 October 1945 (age 79)

Sport
- Sport: Sports shooting

Juan Casamajo (born 25 October 1945) is a Spanish sports shooter. He competed in the mixed 50 metre rifle prone event at the 1980 Summer Olympics.
