= Pavel Pulda =

Czech sport shooter

Personal information
- Nationality: Czech
- Born: 19 April 1949 Pelhřimov, Czechoslovakia
- Died: 18 July 1999 (aged 50)

Sport
- Sport: Sport shooting

Pavel Pulda (19 April 1949 – 18 July 1999) was a Czech sport shooter. He competed at the 1976 Summer Olympics and the 1980 Summer Olympics. He died on 18 July 1999, at the age of 50.
