= Carsten Haurum =

Danish handball player (born 1956)

Personal information
- Nationality: Danish
- Born: July 26, 1956 (age 70) Frederiksberg, Denmark
- Height: 1.85 m (6 ft 1 in)

Sport
- Sport: Handball
- Position: Right wing / Right back
- Current club: Retired

Youth career
- Years: Team
- -1975: Holte IF

Senior clubs
- Years: Team
- 1975–1982: Holte IF
- 1982–1983: TSV Grün-Weiß Dankersen (Germany)
- 1983-1984: Holte IF
National team
Years	Team	Apps	(Gls)
1978–1984	Denmark	108	(227)

Carsten Haurum (born July 26, 1956) is a Danish former handball player who competed in the 1980 Summer Olympics and in the 1984 Summer Olympics. He is the father of fellow handballplayer Christina Haurum.

He debuted for the national team in 1978 against West Germany. In 1980 he was part of the Danish team which finished ninth in the Olympic tournament. He played five matches and scored eight goals.

Four years later he finished fourth with the Danish team in the 1984 Olympic tournament. He played one match and scored three goals.

After finishing his education as Cand. Polit. he decided to end his playing career he worked as administrating director in the culture- and leisure department in Copenhagen Municipality for 14 years, and he has been the chairperson of the Danish Cultural Institute.
