= Gilbert Hoef =

Belgian sports shooter

Personal information
- Nationality: Belgian
- Born: 31 December 1945 (age 79); Bruges, Belgium

Sport
- Sport: Sports shooting

Gilbert Hoef (born 31 December 1945) is a Belgian sports shooter. He competed at the 1980 Summer Olympics and the 1984 Summer Olympics.
