= Sonja Hausladen =

Austrian swimmer

Personal information
- Born: 5 July 1963 (age 63) Vienna, Austria

Sport
- Sport: Swimming

Sonja Hausladen (born 5 July 1963) is an Austrian butterfly and individual medley swimmer. She competed at the 1980 Summer Olympics and the 1984 Summer Olympics.
