= Dorit Ganster =

Austrian field hockey player

Personal information
- Nationality: Austrian
- Born: 7 April 1963 (age 63) Vienna, Austria

Sport
- Sport: Field hockey

Dorit Ganster (born 7 April 1963) is an Austrian field hockey player. She competed in the women's tournament at the 1980 Summer Olympics.
