= Timo Hagman =

Finnish sports shooter

Personal information
- Nationality: Finnish
- Born: 16 November 1955 (age 69); Kannus, Finland

Sport
- Sport: Sports shooting

Timo Hagman (born 16 November 1955) is a Finnish sports shooter. He competed in two events at the 1980 Summer Olympics.
