= Eva Cambal =

Austrian field hockey player (born 1947)

Personal information
- Nationality: Austrian
- Born: 27 April 1947 (age 78) Vienna, Austria

Sport
- Sport: Field hockey

Eva Cambal (born 27 April 1947) is an Austrian field hockey player. She competed in the women's tournament at the 1980 Summer Olympics.
