= Patricia Lorenz =

Austrian hockey player

Personal information
- Nationality: Austrian
- Born: 18 September 1963 (age 62) Vienna, Austria

Sport
- Sport: Field hockey

Patricia Lorenz (born 18 September 1963) is an Austrian field hockey player. She competed in the women's tournament at the 1980 Summer Olympics.
