= Wolfgang Mayrhofer =

Austrian sailor (born 1958)

Wolfgang Mayrhofer (24 May 1958) is an Austrian competitive sailor and Olympic silver medalist as well as Professor Emeritus of Management and Organizational Behavior at WU Vienna University of Business and Economics, Austria.

He won a silver medal in the Finn class at the 1980 Summer Olympics in Moscow. Wolfgang Mayrhofer is sailing since the age of 5. From 1963 to 1973 he sailed Optimist, the single-handed boat for children below the age of 15; 1969 top-sailor worldwide in the Optimist below the age of 12. Sailing OK-Dinghy from 1974 to 1976 and Finn-Dinghy (Olympic class 1952-2020) from 1976 to 1983. In OK and Finn several times national champion; participating in numerous European and World championships at the junior and senior level. In the Finn-class European runner up (junior) in Finn in 1979; silver medalist in the Olympic Games in 1980 (Moscow/Tallinn). Since 1983 recreational sailing with occasional dinghy and big-boat racing. He was co-founder of Championships.at that used sail boats as a unique field of experience in offering outdoor-trainings on sailboats focused on team building, team development, leadership and communication, especially for middle and top managers.

== Service to Academia ==
Professionally, Wolfgang Mayrhofer is Professor Emeritus of Management and Organisational Behaviour at the Department of Management, WU Vienna University of Economics and Business), Austria. He previously has held research and teaching positions at the University of Paderborn, Germany, and at Dresden University of Technology, Germany, after receiving his diploma and doctoral degrees in Business Administration from WU.

He conducts research in the area of comparative international human resource management and leadership, work careers, and systems theory and management and has received several national and international rewards for outstanding research and service to the academic community. He has had many international teaching assignments, among others at Copenhagen Business School (Denmark), the United Nations (Geneva), ESADE (Barcelona, Spain), Estonian Business School (Tallinn, Estonia), Hertie School of Governance (Berlin, Germany), INCAE (Costa Rica), Rotterdam School of Management (The Netherlands), Universidad Carlos III (Madrid, Spain) and University of Istanbul (Turkey) and regularly consults to both private and public sector organisations, with an emphasis on leadership, team and self-development by outdoor training/sailing (see www.championSHIPs.at).

Wolfgang Mayrhofer is a member of the editorial/advisory editorial board of the Journal for Managerial Psychology, the Journal for Cross-Cultural Competence and Management, the Journal of the International Society for Research in Healthcare Financial Management, the Journal of Management Spirituality and Religion, Management Revue, Zeitschrift für Personalforschung, The Jordanian Journal of Administrative Sciences, the ESADE-DEUSTO Series ‘Managing people in 21st century organisations’ and a corresponding member of Journal for East European Management Studies. He also is an associate at the Centre for Research into the Management of Expatriation, Cranfield, UK, a research fellow at the Centre for Global Workforce Strategy, Simon Fraser University, Canada, member of the academic advisory board of AHRMIO, the Association of Human Resource Management in International Organisations and an appointed visiting professor at Henley Management College, UK.

== Service to Sport ==
Wolfgang Mayrhofer served sport in different capacities. He was instrumental in founding KADA, an institution financed by the Austrian Sports Ministry and the Labor Market Service. It supports top athletes during their active sports career by acquiring competences suitable for their post-sport career as well as when they are transitioning to their post-sport career. He has become the President of KADA in 2024.

He also supported the Austrian Sports Ministry in developing different frameworks, in particular by heading a project for the formulation of the Austrian Sports Support Act (Bundes-Sportförderungsgesetzes 2013) and for Strategy 2018, an initiative to create a common frame for top athletes in Austria.

In the world of sailing, Wolfgang Mayrhofer is not only a long-standing member of the Board of the Austrian Sailing Federation (OeSV) by being First Vice-President responsible for top athletes (2012-2017) and since 2020 again member of the Board of OeSV responsible for international relations. He is also active in World Sailing by representing Group B countries as a member of the World Sailing Council (2020-2024) and as Chair of World Sailing's Events committee (2025-2029).

== Private life ==
Wolfgang Mayrhofer lives in Vienna, Austria, is married and has four children and three grandchildren. He enjoys good food, excellent wines from vineyards across the globe, playing the guitar/bass and sailing at Lake Neusiedl close to Vienna that Austria shares with Hungary.

As confessing Roman-Catholic Christian, he is active in hislocal parish as well as in several grass-roots groups that emphasize the importance of a living personal relationship with the triune God of Christianity that not solely is mediated by members of the body of Christ who are in office. His personal motto (that he more often than not fails to follow): Being a herald of joy, hope, and love.

== Publications ==
He has authored and co-authored more than 175 book chapters and about 100 peer-reviewed articles which have been published, among others, in Career Development International, Employee Relations, Human Relations, Human Resource Management Journal, Human Resource Management Review, International Journal for Human Resource Management, International Studies of Management & Organization, International Executive, Journal of Managerial Psychology, Journal of Occupational and Organisational Psychology, Journal of Vocational Behavior, Management Revue, Organisation Studies, Organizational Dynamics, Die Betriebswirtschaft, Zeitschrift für Personalforschung and Personal.

Wolfgang Mayrhofer has authored, co-authored and co-edited 36 books, among them most recently: Mayrhofer, W., Furtmüller, G., & Kasper, H. (Eds.). 2023. Personalmanagement – Führung – Organisation (Personnel Management – Leadership – Organisation). (6 ed.). Wien: Linde; Mayrhofer, W., & Steyrer, J. (Eds.). 2023. Karriereachterbahn: Was unsere Berufswege wirklich beeinflusst (Career Roller Coaster: What really influences our professional trajectories). Wien: Linde; 3. Briscoe, J., Dickman, M., Hall, D. T., Mayrhofer, W., & Parry, E. (Eds). 2023. Understanding Careers Around the Globe. Stories and Sourcebook. Cheltenham, Northampton: Edward Elgar Publishing; Altman, Yochanan, Judi Neal, and Wolfgang Mayrhofer (Eds.). 2022. Workplace Spirituality. Making a Difference. Berlin, Boston: de Gruyter; Gunz, H. P., Lazarova, M. B., & Mayrhofer, W. (Eds.). 2020. The Routledge Companion to Career Studies. Milton Park: Routledge; Brewster, C., Mayrhofer, W., & Farndale, E. (Eds.). 2018. Handbook Of Research On Comparative Human Resource Management. (2 ed.). Cheltenham: Edward Elgar; Gunz, H. & Mayrhofer, W. 2018. Rethinking Career Studies. Facilitating Conversation Across Boundaries with the Social Chronology Framework. Cambridge: Cambridge University Press; Mabey, C. & Mayrhofer, W. (Eds.). 2015. Developing Leadership. Questions Business Schools Don't Ask. Los Angeles et al.: Sage; Mayrhofer, W., Furtmüller, G., & Kasper, H. (Eds.). 2015. Personalmanagement – Führung – Organisation (5 ed.). Wien: Linde
