= Sabine Blemenschütz =

Austrian hockey player (born 1964)

Personal information
- Nationality: Austrian
- Born: 28 July 1964 (age 61) Vienna, Austria

Sport
- Sport: Field hockey

Sabine Blemenschütz (born 28 July 1964) is an Austrian field hockey player. She competed in the women's tournament at the 1980 Summer Olympics.
