= Erling Johansen =

Danish weightlifter

Personal information
- Nationality: Danish
- Born: 22 October 1944 (age 82) Frederiksberg, Denmark

Sport
- Sport: Weightlifting

Erling Johansen (born 22 October 1944) is a Danish weightlifter. He competed at the 1972 Summer Olympics, the 1976 Summer Olympics and the 1980 Summer Olympics.
