= Hannes Rainer =

Austrian sports shooter (1954–2020)

Personal information
- Nationality: Austrian
- Born: 14 March 1954 Rottenmann, Austria
- Died: 23 June 2020 (aged 66)

Sport
- Sport: Sports shooting

Hannes Rainer (14 March 1954 – 23 June 2020) was an Austrian sports shooter. He competed in the mixed 50 metre rifle prone event at the 1980 Summer Olympics.
