= Andrea Kozma =

Austrian field hockey player

Personal information
- Nationality: Austrian
- Born: 8 October 1962 (age 63) Vienna, Austria

Sport
- Sport: Field hockey

Andrea Kozma (born 8 October 1962) is an Austrian field hockey player. She competed in the women's tournament at the 1980 Summer Olympics.
