= Finn Danielsen =

Danish sports shooter (born 1955)

Personal information
- Nationality: Danish
- Born: 19 April 1955 (age 69); Holstebro, Denmark

Sport
- Sport: Sports shooting

Finn Danielsen (born 19 April 1955) is a Danish sports shooter. He competed in the mixed 50 metre rifle three positions event at the 1980 Summer Olympics.
