= Petar Zapryanov =

Bulgarian sport shooter

Medal record

Men's sport shooting

Representing Bulgaria

Olympic Games
Bronze medal – third place	1980 Moscow	50 metre rifle prone

Petar Dimitrov Zapryanov (Bulgarian: Петър Димитров Запрянов, March 23, 1959) was born in Plovdiv, Bulgaria. He is a sport shooter and won a bronze medal in the 50 metre rifle prone event at the 1980 Summer Olympics in Moscow.
