= Palle Jensen =

Danish handball player (born 1953)

Palle Jensen (born January 8, 1953) is a Danish former handball player who competed in the 1976 Summer Olympics and in the 1980 Summer Olympics.

He was born in Sønderborg.

In 1976 he was part of the Danish team which finished eighth in the Olympic tournament. He played all six matches and scored ten goals.

Four years later he finished ninth with the Danish team in the 1980 Olympic tournament. He played five matches and scored eight goals.

He's now working as a senior teacher at Virum Skole in Denmark.
