= Jyrki Lehtonen =

Finnish sports shooter

Personal information
- Nationality: Finnish
- Born: 16 September 1948 (age 76); Helsinki, Finland

Sport
- Sport: Sports shooting

Jyrki Lehtonen (born 16 September 1948) is a Finnish sports shooter. He competed in the mixed 50 metre rifle prone event at the 1980 Summer Olympics.
