= Erika Csar =

Austrian field hockey player (1961–2010)

Personal information
- Nationality: Austrian
- Born: 26 July 1961 Vienna, Austria
- Died: 27 January 2010 (aged 48) Vienna, Austria

Sport
- Sport: Field hockey

Erika Csar (26 July 1961 – 24 January 2010) was an Austrian field hockey player. She competed in the women's tournament at the 1980 Summer Olympics.
