= Adolf Jakeš =

Czech sport shooter

Personal information
- Nationality: Czech
- Born: 20 May 1943 (age 82) České Budějovice, Czechoslovakia

Sport
- Country: Czechoslovakia
- Sport: Sport shooting

Adolf Jakeš (born 20 May 1943) is a Czech sport shooter. He competed for Czechoslovakia in two events at the 1980 Summer Olympics.
