= Krzysztof Stefaniak =

Polish sports shooter

Personal information
- Nationality: Polish
- Born: 10 December 1957 (age 67); Poznań, Poland

Sport
- Sport: Sports shooting

Krzysztof Stefaniak (born 10 December 1957) is a Polish sports shooter. He competed in the mixed 50 metre rifle prone event at the 1980 Summer Olympics.
