= Csaba Kuzma =

Hungarian boxer (1954–2026)

Personal information
- Nationality: Hungary
- Born: 20 September 1954 Tatabánya, Komárom-Esztergom County, Hungary
- Died: 12 April 2026 (aged 71)
- Height: 1.82 m (5 ft 11 1/2 in)
- Weight: 81 kg (179 lb)

Sport
- Sport: Boxing
- Weight class: Light Heavyweight
- Club: Tatabányai Bányász Sport Club

Csaba Kuzma (20 November 1954 – 12 April 2026) was a Hungarian light-heavyweight boxer, who represented his native country at the 1980 Summer Olympics in Moscow, Soviet Union. There he was eliminated in the first round by Denmark's Michael Madsen on points (2–3).

Kuzma died on 12 April 2026, at the age of 71.

== Sources ==
- sports-reference
