= Herwig Bayer =

Austrian swimmer

Personal information
- Born: 13 February 1963 (age 63) Klagenfurt, Austria

Sport
- Sport: Swimming

Herwig Bayer (born 13 February 1963) is an Austrian swimmer. He competed in two events at the 1980 Summer Olympics.
