= Károly Varga =

Hungarian sport shooter

Medal record

Men's sport shooting

Representing Hungary

Olympic Games
| Gold medal – first place | 1980 Moscow | 50 metre rifle prone |

Károly Varga (born 28 September 1955 in Budapest) is a Hungarian sport shooter and Olympic champion. He won a gold medal in the 50 metre rifle prone event at the 1980 Summer Olympics in Moscow.
