= Bernd Hartstein =

German sport shooter

Olympic medal record

Shooting

Representing East Germany
Silver medal – second place	1980 Moskva	50 m rifle 3 positions

Bernd Hartstein (born 26 October 1947 in Ostrau; d. 23 February 2002 in Frankfurt am Main) was a German sport shooter and trainer. In 1980, he won the Olympic silver medal in small-bore rifle, three positions, for East Germany

Hartstein started for GST-Klub Leipzig (a Gesellschaft für Sport und Technik club). In 1968, he became East German Junior Champion. Beginning in 1972 and on into the 1980s, he won East German championship titles in small-bore rifle, three-positions and prone-position competitions. Besides this, he also won championship titles in air rifle shooting.

At the 1976 Summer Olympics in Montreal, Hartstein scored ninth place in the three-positions competition. At the 1979 World Championships, he reached second place behind Bulgaria's Nonka Matova. Likewise, at the 1980 Summer Olympics in Moscow, he won a silver medal, while the Soviet Union's Viktor Vlassov won gold.

Hartstein won several medals with the East German team. At the 1981 World Championships, he won together with Frank Rettkowski and Andreas Wolfram in the team score for kneeling-position. In 1985, Hartstein won a further single medal at a world championship: in a prone-position competition, he scored second place behind Kiril Ivanov.

The trained electrician completed a course of study in sport during his career. After 1990, when Germany reunited, he became state trainer in Hesse. In March 2001, Hartstein fell ill with leukaemia. The Hessian Shooting Association (Hessischer Schützenverband) sent out a call for bone marrow donations. Although several hundred persons heeded the call, it was almost a year before a suitable donor was found. By then, it was too late, and Hartstein died in early 2002 at the Frankfurter Universitätsklinik.
