= Mikko Lehtonen =

Mikko Lehtonen is the name of:

- Mikko Lehtonen (ice hockey, born 1978), Finnish ice hockey defenceman from Kiiminki
- Mikko Lehtonen (ice hockey, born 1987), Finnish ice hockey forward from Espoo
- Mikko Lehtonen (ice hockey, born 1994), Finnish ice hockey player from Turku
