= Hellfried Heilfort =

German sport shooter

Olympic medal record

Shooting

Representing East Germany
Silver medal – second place	1980 Moskva	50 m rifle prone

Hellfried Heilfort (born 10 April 1955 in Groitzsch) is a German former sport shooter who competed in the 1980 Summer Olympics.
