= Sven Johansson (sport shooter) =

Swedish sport shooter

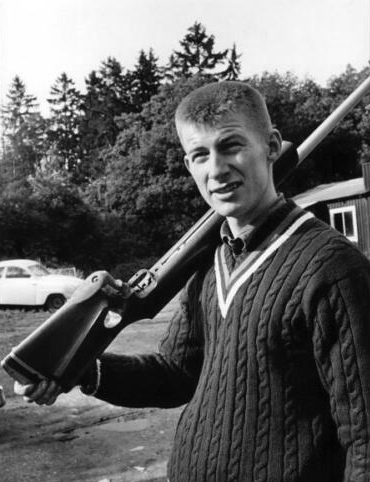
- Johansson in 1968

Personal information
- Born: 1 January 1945 (age 81) Värnamo, Sweden
- Height: 184 cm (6 ft 0 in)
- Weight: 78 kg (172 lb)

Sport
- Sport: Rifle shooting
- Club: Skillingaryds SG (1968); Uppsala SSK (1972–76); Jönköpings SSK (1980)
Medal record
Representing Sweden
Olympic Games
Bronze medal – third place	1980 Moskva	50 m 3 positions
World championships
Bronze medal – third place	1970 Phoenix	50 m kneeling

Sven Johansson (born 1 January 1945) is a retired Swedish rifle shooter. He competed in two-three individual events at the 1968, 1972, 1976 and 1980 Olympics and won a bronze medal in 50 metre rifle three positions in 1980. Johansson also won one bronze medal at the world (1970) and two at European championships (1969 and 1977).
