= Dynamo Shooting Range =

Firing range in Moscow, Russia

The Dynamo Shooting Range was a firing range located in Mytishchi in the then Eastern Planning Zone of Moscow, Russia. Constructed in 1957 and renovated in 1979, it hosted the shooting and the shooting part of the modern pentathlon events for the 1980 Summer Olympics. Demolished in 2016.
