= Hans Kjeld Rasmussen =

Danish sport shooter (1954–2025)

Personal information
- Born: 10 November 1954 Glostrup, Hovedstaden, Denmark
- Died: February 2025 (aged 70)
- Height: 1.78 m (5 ft 10 in)
Medal record
Men's shooting
Representing Denmark
Olympic Games
Gold medal – first place	1980 Moscow	Skeet

Hans Kjeld Rasmussen (10 November 1954 – February 2025) was a Danish sport shooter and Olympic champion. He won a gold medal in skeet shooting at the 1980 Summer Olympics in Moscow. Rasmussen died in February 2025, at the age of 70.
