= 1980 Summer Olympics =

Multi-sport event in Moscow, Russian SFSR, Soviet Union

Games of the XXII Olympiad
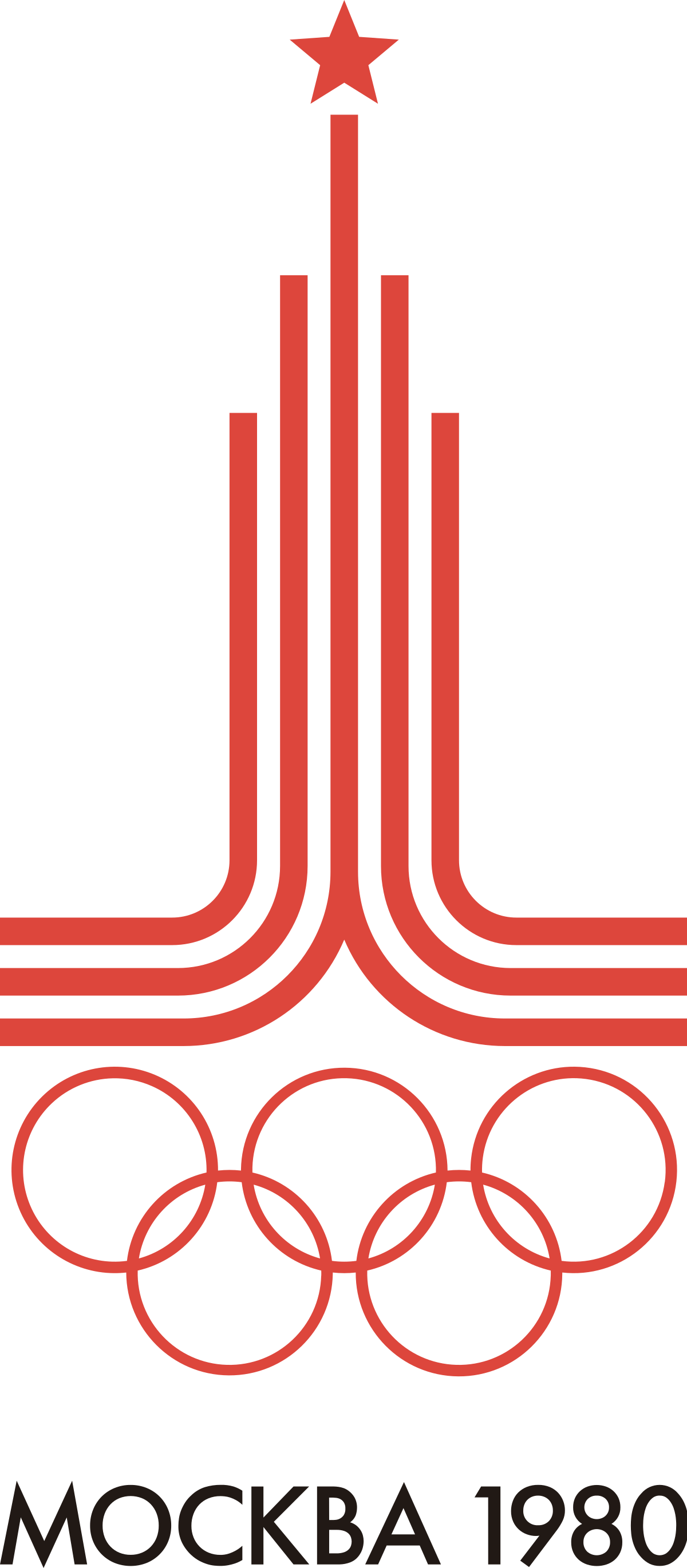
- Emblem of the 1980 Summer Olympics
- Location: Moscow, Soviet Union
- Nations: 80
- Athletes: 5,256 (4,137 men, 1,119 women)
- Events: 203 in 21 sports (27 disciplines)
- Opening: 19 July 1980
- Closing: 3 August 1980
- Opened by: General Secretary Leonid Brezhnev (Note: IOC records state Brezhnev opened the Moscow Games as "President", a title used at that time by the Chairman of the Presidium of the Supreme Soviet, or de jure head of state. (The office of President of the Soviet Union was not created until 1990, a year before the nation broke up.) Though Brezhnev was de facto ruler serving as the General Secretary of the Communist Party, that title is not reflected in IOC records.)
- Closed by: IOC president Lord Killanin
- Cauldron: Sergei Belov
- Stadium: Grand Arena of the Central Lenin Stadium

The 1980 Summer Olympics (Russian: Летние Олимпийские игры 1980, romanized: Letniye Olimpiyskiye igry 1980), (Note: Officially known as the Games of the XXII Olympiad (Russian: Игры XXII Олимпиады, romanized: Igry XXII Olimpiady)) officially branded as Moscow 1980 (Москва 1980, Moskva 1980), were an international multi-sport event held from 19 July to 3 August 1980 in Moscow, Russian SFSR, Soviet Union. The games were the first to be staged in an Eastern Bloc country. They were also the only Summer Olympic Games to be held in a communist state until the 2008 Summer Olympics held in China. These were the final Olympic Games under the IOC Presidency of Michael Morris, 3rd Baron Killanin before he was succeeded by Juan Antonio Samaranch shortly afterward.

Eighty nations were represented at the Moscow Games, the smallest number since 1956. Led by the United States, 66 countries boycotted the games entirely, because of the Soviet–Afghan War. Several alternative events were held outside of the Soviet Union. Some athletes from some of the boycotting countries (not included in the list of 66 countries that boycotted the games entirely) participated in the games under the Olympic Flag. The Soviet Union later boycotted the 1984 Summer Olympics in Los Angeles. The Soviet Union won the most gold and overall medals, with the USSR and East Germany winning 127 out of 203 available golds.

== Host city selection ==
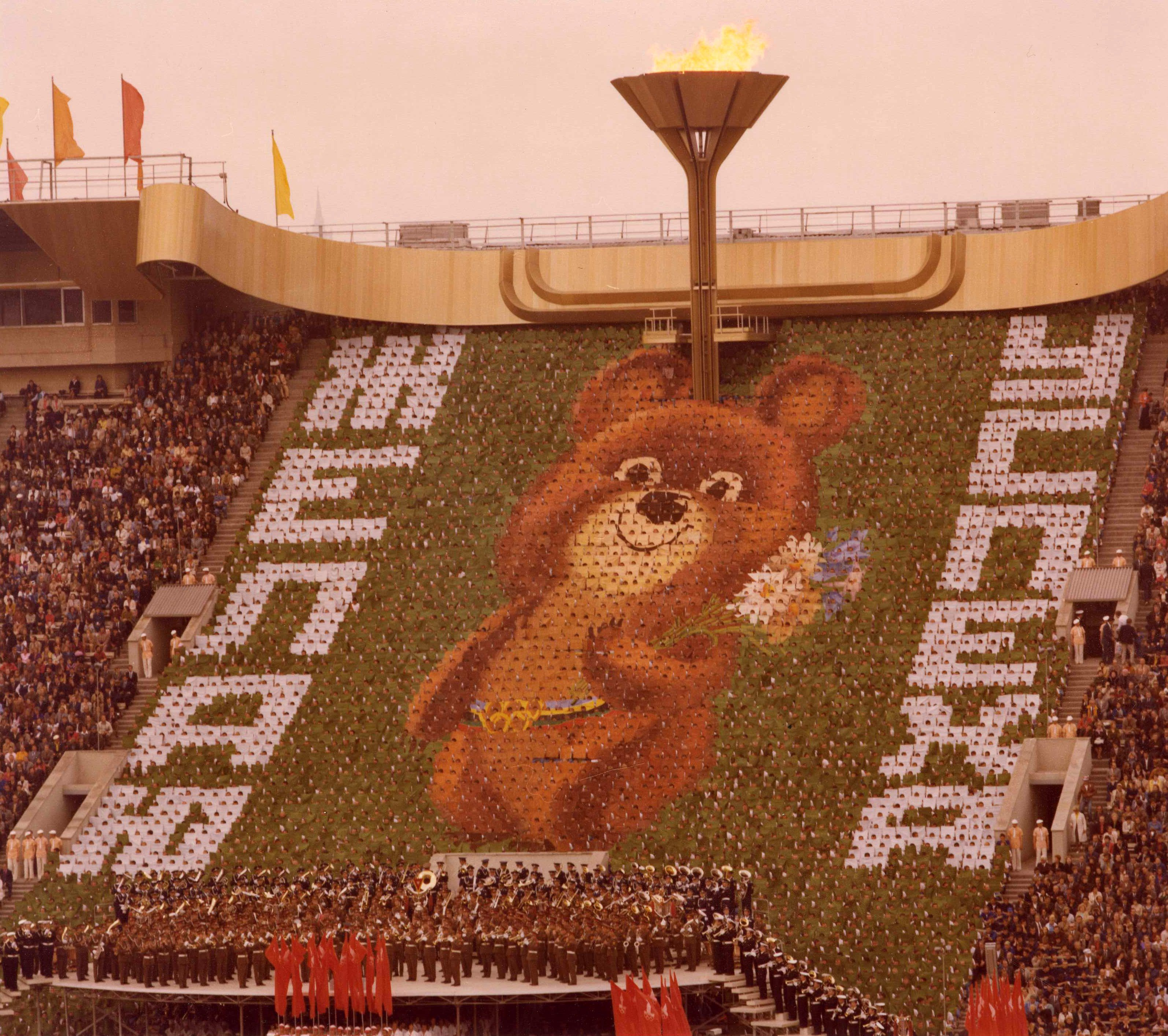
At Moscow's Lenin Stadium, a lit Olympic cauldron towers over spectators in the opening ceremony of the 1980 Olympics. The cauldron overlooks a "human mosaic" displaying Misha, the bear mascot of the Games. The text on the sides of the mosaic is, in Russian, the words "I wish you success!"

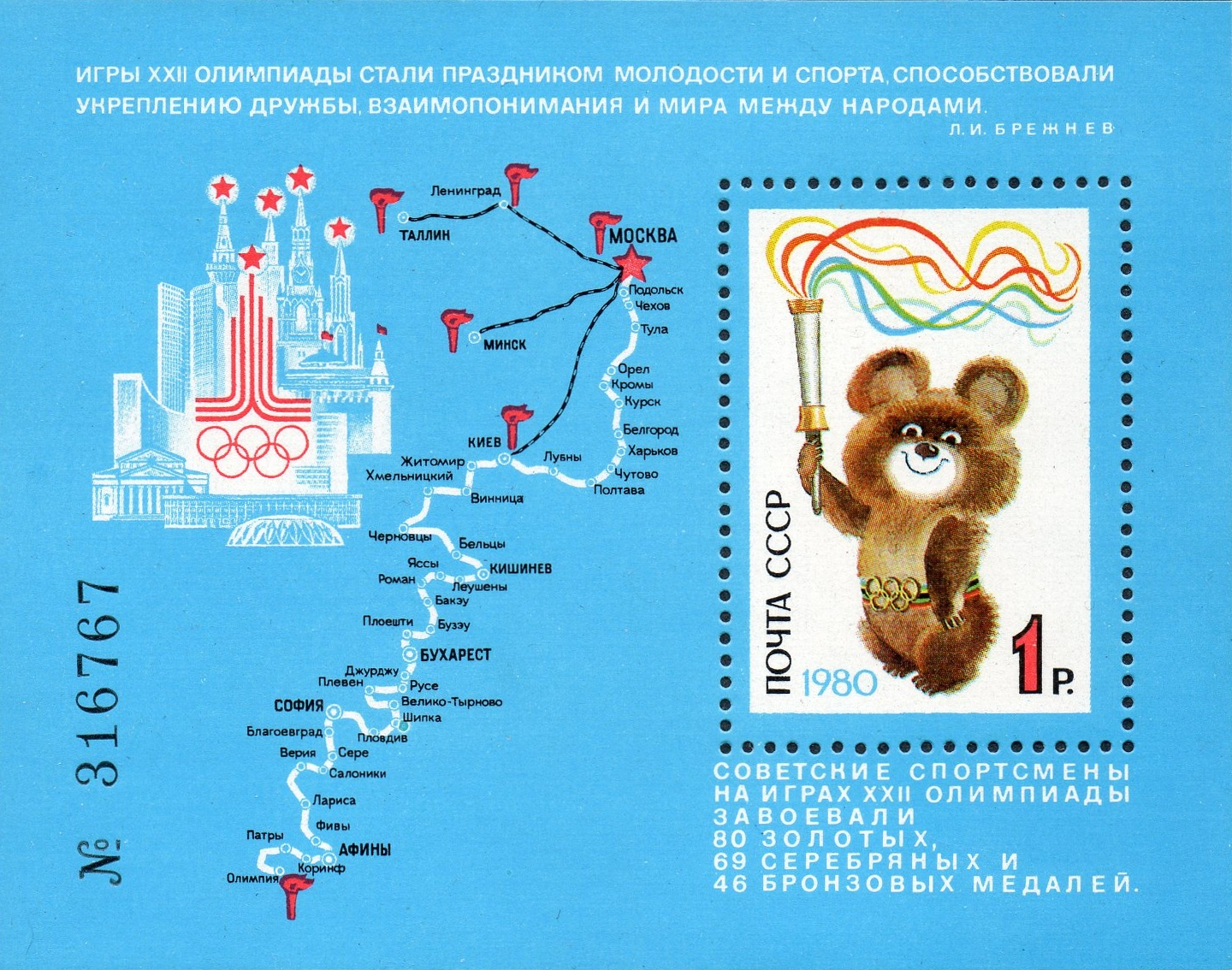
A Soviet stamp sheet showing the logo of the games and its mascot Misha holding the 1980 Olympic torch. The map shows the torch relay route from Olympia, Greece, the site of the ancient Olympic Games, to Moscow, Russian SFSR. It also depicts the number of gold, silver and bronze medals (80, 69, 46) won by the Soviet athletes at the Games.

The only two cities to bid for the 1980 Summer Olympics were Moscow and Los Angeles. The choice between them was made at the 75th IOC Session in Vienna, Austria on 23 October 1974. Los Angeles would eventually host the 1984 Summer Olympics.

1980 Summer Olympics bidding result
City	Country	Votes
Moscow	Soviet Union	39
Los Angeles	United States	20
Abstentions		2

== Participation and boycott ==
Countries boycotting the 1980 Games are shaded blue. Countries partially boycotting the Games by entering under an Olympic or National Olympic Committee flag are shaded green.

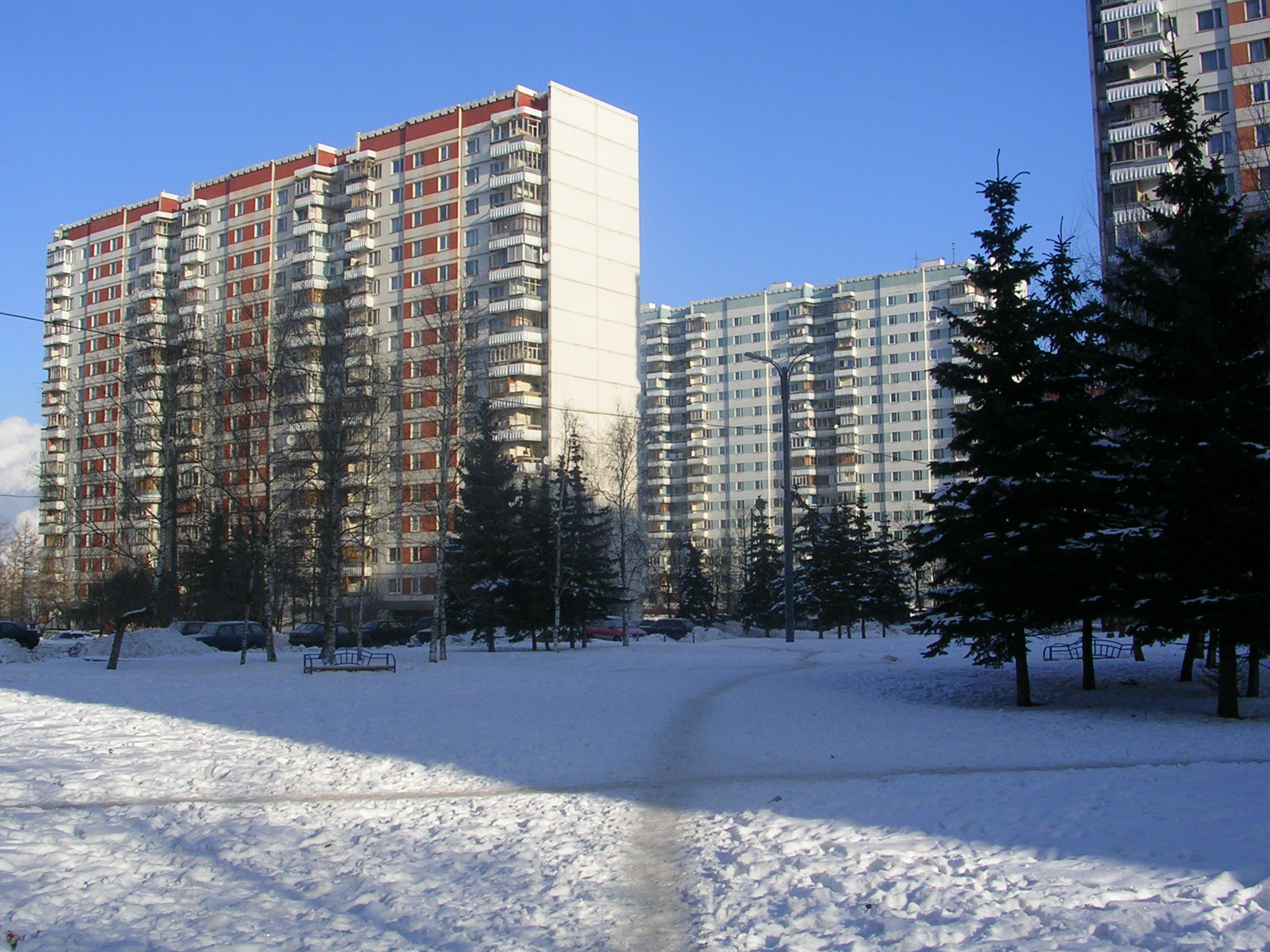
Olympic Village in February 2004

Eighty nations were represented at the Moscow Olympics, the smallest number since 1956. Of the eighty participating nations, seven National Olympic Committees made their first appearance at these Games: Angola, Botswana, Cyprus, Jordan, Laos, Mozambique and Seychelles. It was also the first time Vietnam participated after the end of the Vietnam War and the Reunification of Vietnam. None of these nations won a medal.

29 countries boycotted the previous 1976 Summer Olympics in protest against the IOC for not expelling New Zealand, which had sanctioned a rugby tour of apartheid South Africa. The 1980 Summer Olympics were disrupted by another, even larger, boycott led by the United States in protest of the 1979 Soviet–Afghan War. The Soviet invasion spurred President Jimmy Carter to issue an ultimatum on 20 January 1980, which stated that the U.S. would boycott the Moscow Olympics if Soviet troops did not withdraw from Afghanistan within one month. 66 countries and regions invited did not participate in the 1980 Olympics. Many of these followed the United States' boycott initiative, while others cited economic reasons for not participating. Iran, under Ayatollah Khomeini hostile to both superpowers, boycotted when the Islamic Conference condemned the invasion. Neither the People's Republic of China (as a consequence of the Sino-Soviet split) nor Taiwan (Republic of China) participated in the games.

Many of the boycotting nations participated instead in the Liberty Bell Classic, also known as the "Olympic Boycott Games", in Philadelphia. Those that competed had won 71 percent of all medals and gold medals at the 1976 Summer Olympics in Montreal. This was in part due to state-run doping programs that had been developed in the Eastern Bloc countries. As a form of protest against the Soviet intervention in Afghanistan, fifteen countries marched in the Opening Ceremony with the Olympic Flag instead of their national flags, and the Olympic Flag and Olympic Hymn were used at medal ceremonies when athletes from these countries won medals. Competitors from New Zealand, Portugal, and Spain competed under the flags of their respective National Olympic Committees. Some of these teams that marched under flags other than their national flags were depleted by boycotts by individual athletes, while some athletes did not participate in the march.

The boycott impacted the competitiveness of swimming, track and field, boxing, basketball, diving, field hockey and equestrian sports. Whilst competitors from 36 countries became Olympic medalists, the great majority of the medals were taken by the Soviet Union and East Germany in what was the most skewed medal tally since 1904.

== Events, records and drug tests ==
There were 203 events – more than at any previous Olympics. 36 world records, 39 European records and 74 Olympic records were set at the games. In total, this was more records than were set at Montreal. New Olympic records were set 241 times over the course of the competitions and world records were beaten 97 times.

Though no athletes were caught doping at the 1980 Summer Olympics, it has been revealed that athletes had begun using testosterone and other drugs for which tests had not been yet developed. According to British journalist Andrew Jennings, a KGB colonel stated that the agency's officers had posed as anti-doping authorities from the International Olympic Committee (IOC) to undermine doping tests and that Soviet athletes were "rescued with [these] tremendous efforts".

A member of the IOC Medical Commission, Manfred Donike, privately ran additional tests with a new technique for identifying abnormal levels of testosterone by measuring its ratio to epitestosterone in urine. Twenty percent of the specimens he tested, including those from sixteen gold medalists would have resulted in disciplinary proceedings had the tests been official. The results of Donike's unofficial tests later convinced the IOC to add his new technique to their testing protocols. The first documented case of "blood doping" occurred at the 1980 Summer Olympics as a runner was transfused with two pints of blood before winning medals in the 5000 m and 10,000 m.

== Media and broadcasting ==
Major broadcasters of the 1980 Games were USSR State TV and Radio (1,370 accreditation cards), Eurovision (31 countries, 818 cards) and Intervision (11 countries, 342 cards). TV Asahi with 68 cards provided coverage for Japan, while OTI, representing Latin America, received 59 cards, and the Seven Network provided coverage for Australia (48 cards). NBC, which had intended to be another major broadcaster, canceled its coverage in response to the U.S. boycott of the 1980 Games, and became a minor broadcaster with 56 accreditation cards, although they did air highlights and recaps of the Games on a regular basis. ABC aired scenes of the opening ceremony during its Nightline program, and promised highlights each night, but later announced that they could not air any highlights as NBC still had exclusive broadcast rights in the US. The Canadian Broadcasting Corporation (CBC) almost canceled their plans for coverage after Canada took part in the boycott, and was represented by nine cards. The television center used 20 television channels, compared to 16 for the Montreal Games, 12 for the Munich Games, and seven for the Mexico City Games. This was also the first time North Korea was watching, as KCTV (Korea Central Television) broadcast it as their first satellite program.

== Commemoration ==
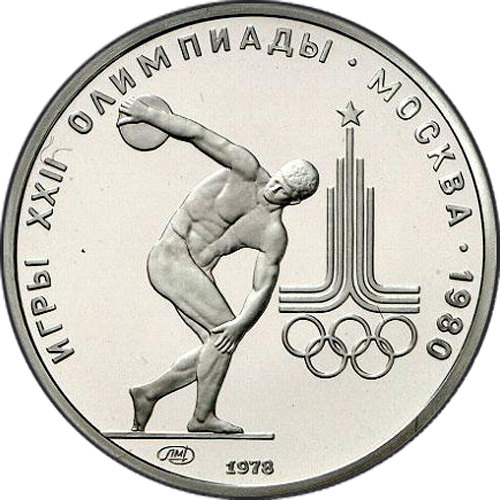
150-rubles platinum coin (reverse)

A series of commemorative coins was released in the USSR in 1977–1980 to commemorate the event. It consisted of five platinum coins, six gold coins, 28 silver coins and six copper-nickel coins.

== Budget ==
According to the Official Report, submitted to the IOC by the NOC of the USSR, total expenditures for the preparations for and staging of the 1980 Games were US$1,350,000,000, total revenues being US$231,000,000. To obtain additional funds for the competition, the Organizing Committee organized Olympic lotteries. The proceeds from the lotteries covered 25% of the cost of holding the competition.

== Cost ==
The Oxford Olympics Study established the outturn cost of the Moscow 1980 Summer Olympics at US$6.3 billion in 2015 dollars. This includes sports-related costs only, that is, (i) operational costs incurred by the organizing committee for the purpose of staging the Games, e.g., expenditures for technology, transportation, workforce, administration, security, catering, ceremonies, and medical services, and (ii) direct capital costs incurred by the host city and country or private investors to build, e.g., the competition venues, the Olympic village, international broadcast center, and media and press center, which are required to host the Games. Indirect capital costs are not included, such as for road, rail, or airport infrastructure, or for hotel upgrades or other business investment incurred in preparation for the Games but not directly related to staging the Games. The cost for Moscow 1980 compares with costs of US$4.6 billion for Rio 2016 (projected), US$40–44 billion for Beijing 2008 and US$51 billion for Sochi 2014, the most expensive Olympics in history. Average cost for the Summer Games since 1960 is US$5.2 billion.

== Event highlights ==
=== Archery ===
- Tomi Poikolainen of Finland, who had not finished any of the previous three days' shooting higher than fourth, came from fourth on the last day to win the men's archery competition, scoring 2455 points. He won gold just three points ahead of a Soviet athlete.
- The women's archery gold was won by Ketevan Losaberidze (USSR), who was also the European, Soviet and world champion.
- The women's archery silver was won by Natalia Butuzova (USSR), who had set nine national records and three world records in 1979.
- The U.S. archery team was one of the strongest ever fielded, but due to the boycott, the team never had a chance to prove itself. This team held every record and featured 1976 Olympic champion Darrell O. Pace, who was averaging 100 points more than the winning score in Moscow at the time.

=== Athletics ===
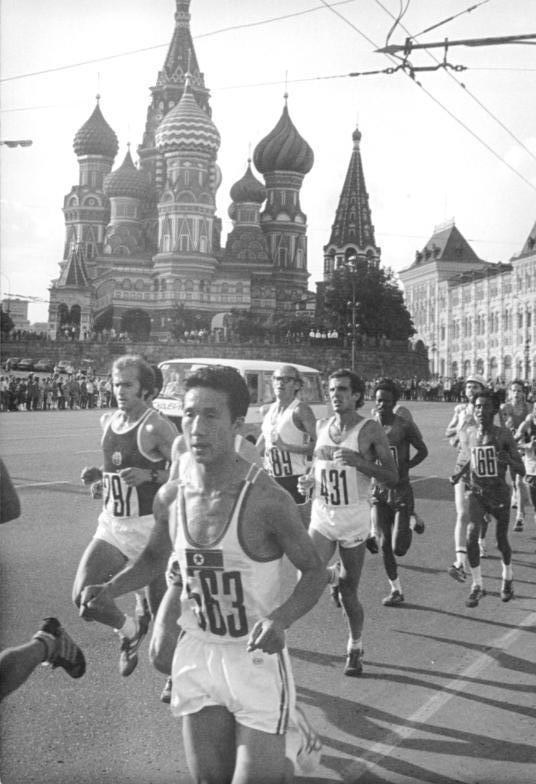
Marathon in front of Saint Basil's Cathedral. The athlete 563 in the foreground is Koh Chun-son from North Korea

- Ethiopian Miruts Yifter won the 5,000 metres and 10,000 metres athletics double, emulating Lasse Virén's 1972 and 1976 performances.
- "I have a 90% chance of winning the 1,500 metres," wrote Steve Ovett in an article for one of Britain's Sunday papers just before the start of the Olympics. After he won the 800 metres Olympic gold, beating world-record holder Sebastian Coe, Ovett stated he would not only win the 1,500 metres race, but would beat the world record by as much as four seconds. Ovett had won 45 straight 1,500 metres races since May 1977. In contrast, Coe had competed in only eight 1,500 metres races between 1976 and 1980. Coe won the race, holding off Ovett in the final lap, who finished third.
- Aided by the absence of American opposition, Allan Wells beat Cuban Silvio Leonard to become the first Briton since 1924 to win the Olympic 100 metres race.
- Gerd Wessig, who had made the East German team only two weeks before the Games, easily won the gold medal with a 2.36 metres (7 ft 9 in) high jump. This was 9 cm higher than he had ever jumped before.
- In the 1980 Olympic women's long jump competition, Soviet jumper Tatiana Kolpakova bested her compatriots and other competitors by setting a new Olympic record of 7.06 metres (23 ft 2 in).
- Poland's Władysław Kozakiewicz won the pole vault with a jump of 5.78 metres (19 ft 0 in) – only the second pole vaulting world record to be established during an Olympics. The previous time had been at the Antwerp Olympics 1920.
- In the long jump competition, three women beat 23 feet (7.0 m) for the first time ever in one competition.
- Waldemar Cierpinski of the German Democratic Republic (East Germany) won his second consecutive marathon gold.
- Bärbel Wöckel, also of the GDR, winner of the 200 metres in Montreal, became the first woman to retain the title.
- Tatiana Kazankina (USSR) retained the 1,500m title that she had won in Montreal.
- In the women's pentathlon, Nadiya Tkachenko (USSR) scored 5,083 points to become the first athlete to exceed 5,000 points in the event during Olympic competition, winning gold.
- For the first time in Olympic history, all eight male participants in the long jump final beat the mark of 8 metres (26 ft 3 in).
- Lutz Dombrowski (GDR) won the long jump gold. His was the longest jump recorded at sea level and he became only the second ever to jump further than 28 feet (8.5 m).
- In the triple jump final, Viktor Saneyev (USSR; present day-Georgia), who won gold at Mexico, Munich and Montreal, won silver behind Jaak Uudmäe (USSR; present day-Estonia) and ahead of Brazil's world record holder João Carlos de Oliveira. Both de Oliveira and Australia's Ian Campbell produced long jumps, but they were declared fouls by the officials and not measured; in Campbell's case, his longest jump was ruled a "scrape foul", with his trailing leg touching the track during the jump. Campbell insisted that he had not scraped, and it was alleged the officials intentionally threw out his and de Oliveira's best jumps to favor the Soviets, similarly to a number of other events.
- Yuriy Sedykh (USSR) won gold in the hammer throw event. Four of his six throws broke the world record of 80m. No hammer thrower in the world had ever achieved this before. As in Montreal, the USSR won gold, silver and bronze in this event.
- Evelin Jahl (GDR), the 1976 Olympic champion, won discus gold again. She won with a new Olympic record – 69.96 metres (229 ft 6 in) – having been undefeated since Montreal.
- Cuba's María Caridad Colón won the women's javelin, setting a new Olympic record.
- Sara Simeoni of Italy won the women's high jump, setting a new Olympic record. She had won a silver in the 1976 Games and would go on to win a silver in the 1984 Games.
- In track-and-field, six world records, eighteen Olympic records and nine best results of the year were registered.
- In women's track and field events, either a world or Olympic record was broken in almost every event.
- Daley Thompson of Great Britain won the gold in the Decathlon. He won gold again at the Los Angeles Olympics.
- Soviet Dainis Kula won gold in the men's javelin. He also had the best sum total of throws, showing his consistency. He finished ahead of his teammate Alexander Makarov.
- Polish gold medallist pole vaulter Władysław Kozakiewicz showed an obscene bras d'honneur gesture in all four directions to the jeering Soviet public, causing an international scandal and almost losing his medal as a result. There were numerous incidents and accusations of Soviet officials using their authority to negate marks by opponents to the point that IAAF officials found the need to look over the officials' shoulders to try to keep the events fair. There were also accusations of opening stadium gates to give Soviet athletes advantage, and causing other disturbances to opposing athletes.

=== Basketball ===
- Basketball was one of the hardest hit sports due to the boycott. Though replacements were found, five men's teams including the defending Olympic Champion United States withdrew from the competition in addition to the US Women's team.
- In the women's competition, the host Soviet Union won the competition beating Bulgaria for gold, Yugoslavia won bronze.
- The men's competition featured only the second instance of the US Men's Basketball team not winning gold with the first one being in Munich. Yugoslavia took home the gold beating Italy in the final. The hosts, Soviet Union, winners in 1972, won the bronze.

=== Boxing ===
- Teófilo Stevenson of Cuba became the first boxer to win three consecutive Olympic titles in heavyweight, and indeed the only boxer to win the same event in three Games. (László Papp from Hungary was the first boxer to win three titles). In boxing, Cuba won six gold, two silvers and two bronzes.
- The Val Barker Trophy is presented by the AIBA to the competitor adjudged to be the best stylist at the Games. The winner was Patrizio Oliva of Italy, who won gold at light-welterweight.

=== Canoeing ===
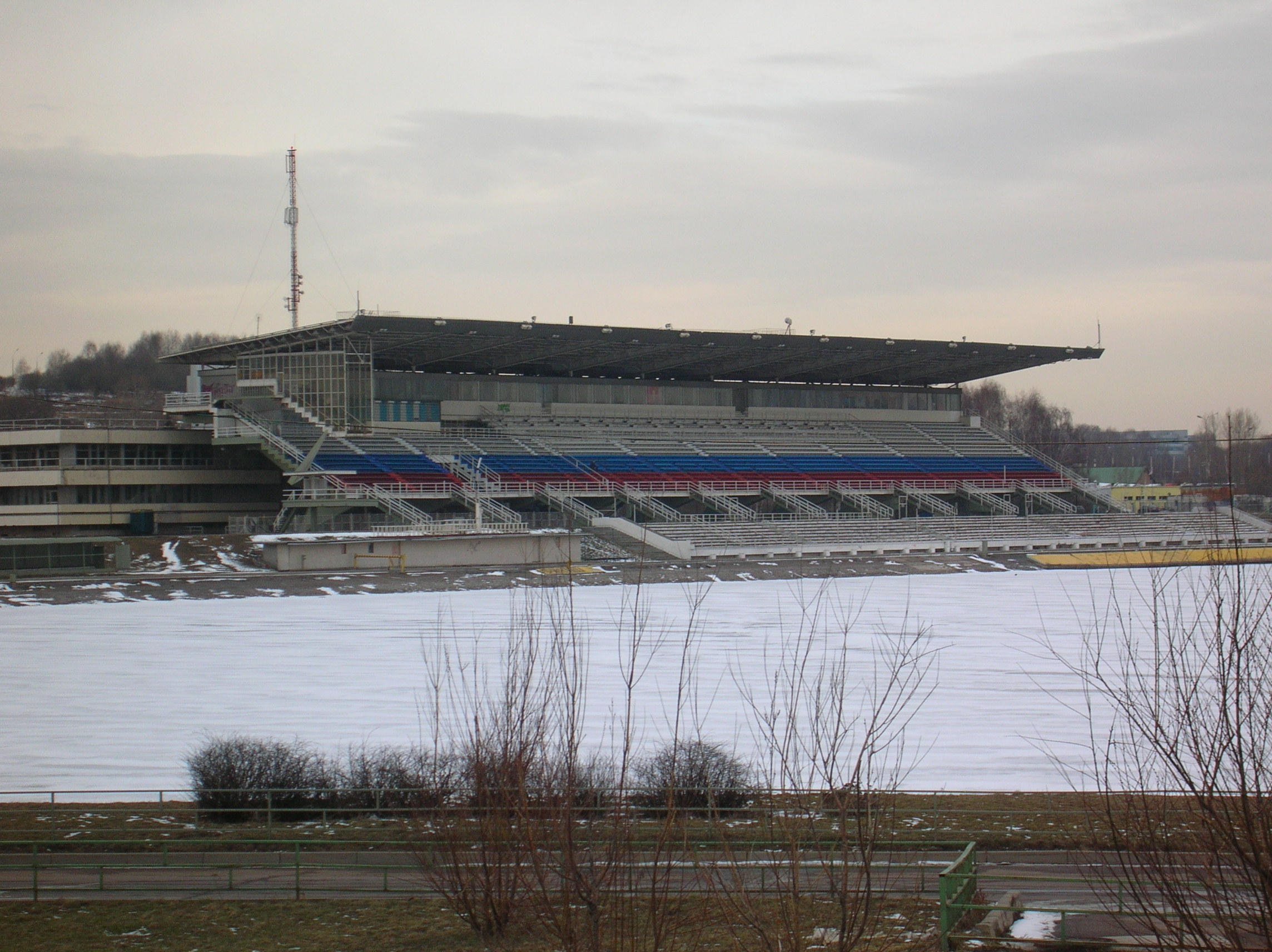
All events in canoeing and rowing took place at the Moscow Canoeing and Rowing Basin in Krylatskoye

- Uladzimir Parfianovich of the USSR won three gold medals in canoeing.
- Apart from the boycotted Los Angeles Olympics, Birgit Fischer of East Germany won medals in each Olympics from 1980 to 2004. In the 500 metres kayak singles, she won gold in Moscow, silver in Seoul, gold in Barcelona.

=== Cycling ===
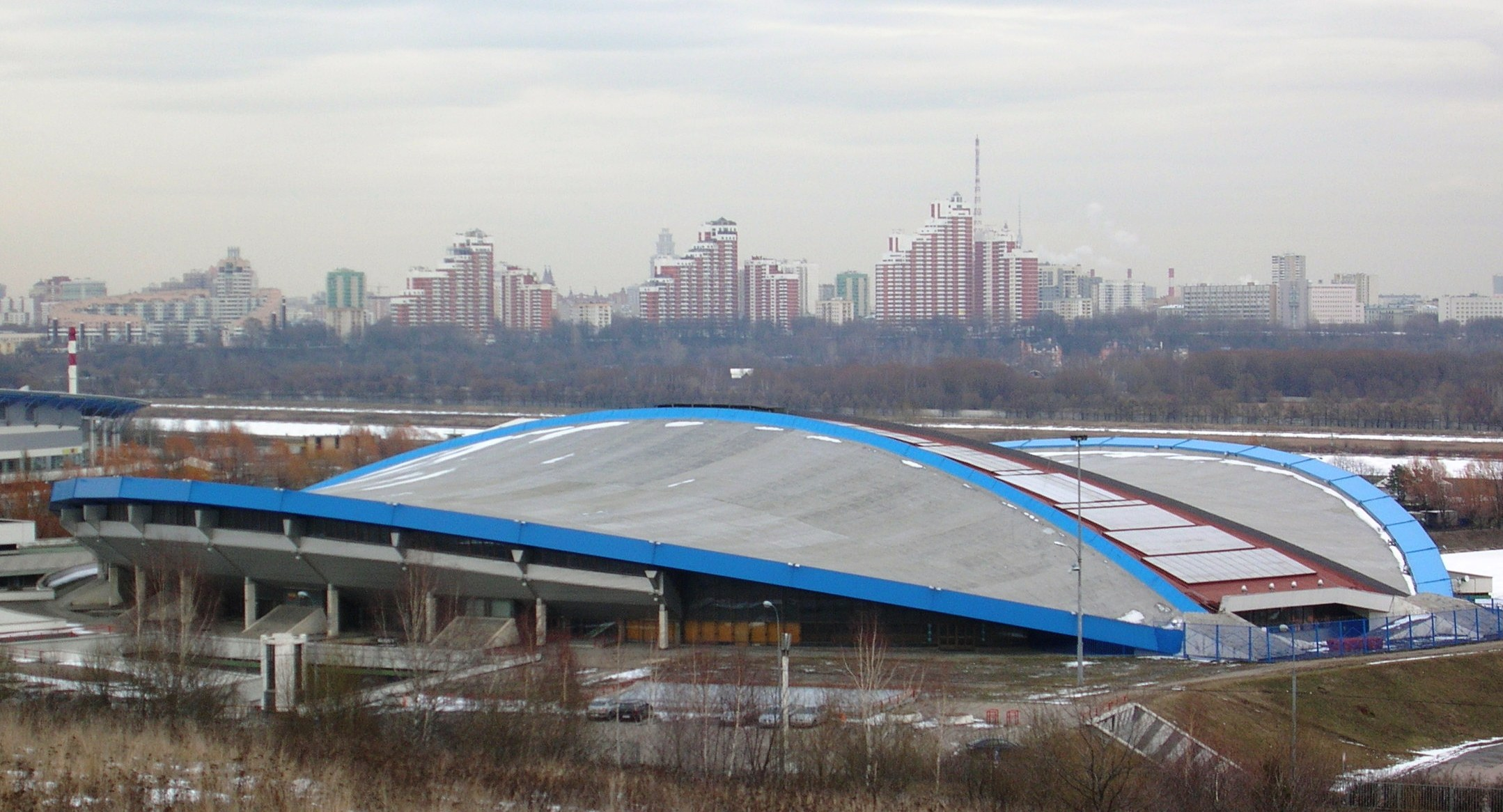
Olympic Velodrome in Krylatskoye

- Lothar Thoms of East Germany won the 1,000-metre individual pursuit cycling gold, breaking the world record by nearly four seconds.
- The winner of the bronze in that race was Jamaica's David Weller who also broke the sixteen-year-old world record.
- In the 4,000-metre team pursuit qualifying heats, new world indoor records were set eight times.
- The 189-kilometer individual road race gold was won by Sergei Sukhoruchenkov (USSR).
- The cycling team road race was won by the Soviet team as they had done in Munich and Montreal.
- In cycling, world records were toppled 21 times.

=== Diving ===
- As Aleksandr Portnov waited to do a 2 and 1/2 reverse somersault in the springboard final, cheers broke out in the adjoining swimming pool during the closing stages of Vladimir Salnikov's world record breaking 1,500m swim. The diver delayed his start until the noise had subsided but, as he took his first steps along the board, even greater cheers broke out as Salnikov touched in under 15 minutes. Under the rules, Portnov, having started, could not stop before take-off. On protest to the Swedish referee G.Olander, he was allowed to repeat the dive, and went ahead again of Mexico's Carlos Girón. Later protests by Mexico against the re-dive and by East Germany that their Falk Hoffmann wanted to re-dive after allegedly being disturbed by photographic flashlights were both turned down by FINA. FINA President Javier Ostas stated that the decision taken by the Swedish referee was the "correct one". FINA assessed all the Olympic diving events and considers the judging to have been objective. Portnov remained the winner, with Giron taking silver and Cagnatto of Italy bronze.
- Martina Jaschke (East Germany) was fourth after the preliminary high dives, but came back to win gold on the second day of competition.
- Irina Kalinina (USSR) won gold in the springboard final. As a result of her ten dives in the preliminaries, she amassed a unique number of points: 478.86. In the previous four years, no diver had scored so many.
- In this final, the Mexican judge A. Marsikal allowed Karin Guthke (East Germany) to re-take a dive.

=== Equestrian ===
- In the individual show jumping event, Poland's Jan Kowalczyk and the USSR's Nikolai Korolkov each had 8 faults, but Kowalczyk won gold as his horse completed the course the quicker. Poland won the last of the 203 gold medals contested.
- The oldest medalist at the Moscow Olympics was Petre Rosca (Romania) in the dressage at 57 years 283 days.

=== Fencing ===
- France took four gold medals in fencing.
- In the team sabre fencing final, for the fifth Olympics in a row, Italy and the USSR met. The USSR won as they did in Tokyo, Mexico and Montreal, while Italy's silver was its only medal in fencing.

=== Football ===
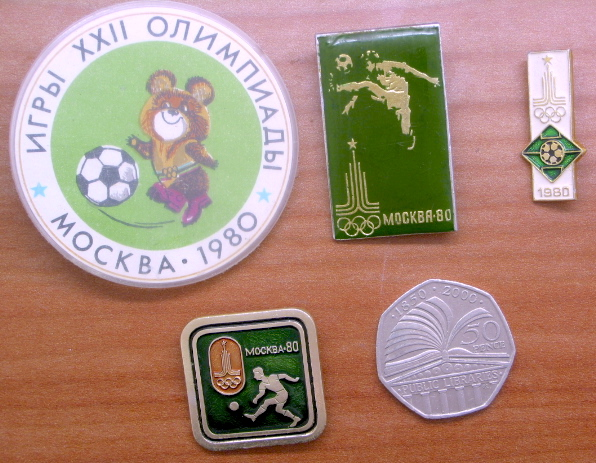
Pins released by the USSR for the football event of the Olympics (with a British 50 pence coin for size comparison)

- The USSR won bronze. Czechoslovakia won the gold medal beating German Democratic Republic (East Germany) 1:0 in the final.
- The matches were played in Moscow and Leningrad (Russian SFSR), and some preliminary games were hosted by Kiev and Minsk, in the Ukrainian SSR and Byelorussian SSR respectively.

=== Gymnastics ===
- Soviet gymnast Alexander Dityatin won a medal in each of the eight gymnastics events, including three titles. He was the first athlete to win eight medals at an Olympics. He scored several 10s, the first perfect scores in men's gymnastics since 1924.
- Nikolai Andrianov, who had won gold on floor at both Munich and Montreal, was pipped this time by Roland Bruckner of East Germany. Andrianov retained the vault title he had won in Montreal.
- Zoltán Magyar (Hungary) retained the Olympic title on pommel horse that he had won in Montreal. He was also a three-time world champion and three-time European champion on this piece of apparatus.
- In the team competition, the USSR won the gold medal for the eighth consecutive time, continuing the "gold" series that started in 1952.
- In the women's gymnastics event finals, a Romanian gymnast medals on each piece of apparatus for the first time:
  - Balance Beam – Nadia Comăneci (gold)
  - Floor – Nadia Comăneci (gold)
  - Uneven Bar – Emilia Eberle (silver) & Melita Ruhn (bronze)
  - Vault – Melita Ruhn (bronze)
- Before the Los Angeles Olympics, the United States gymnastics federation proposed a change in the rules so that a head judge cannot interfere and meddle in the scoring of competitors.

=== Handball ===
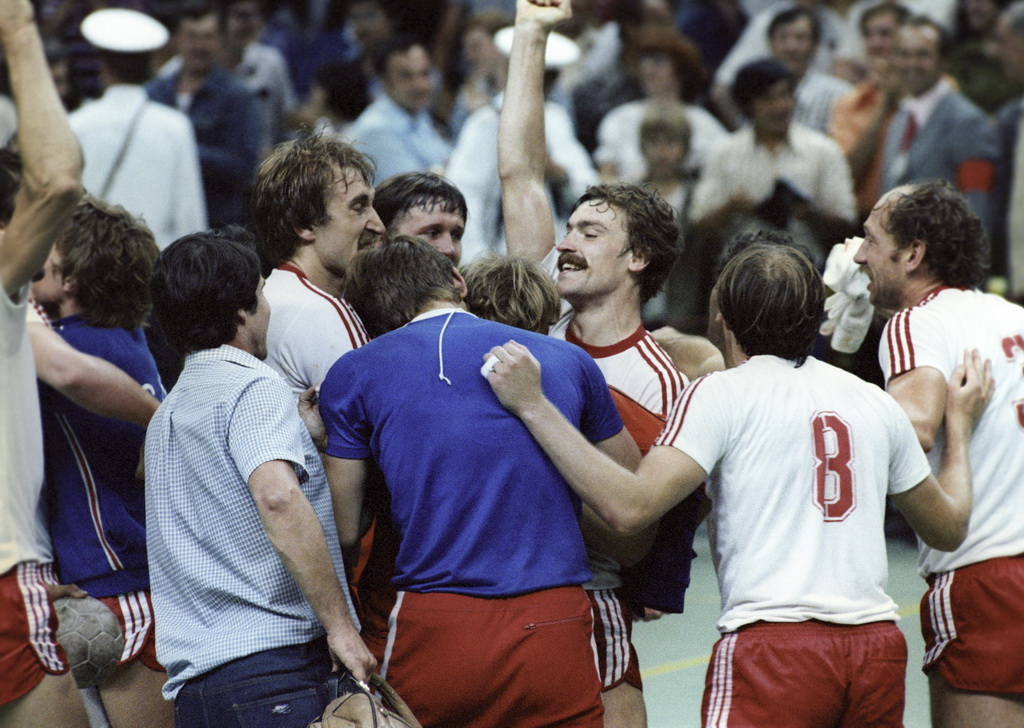
The USSR men's handball team celebrating their victory over Yugoslavia

- In the men's event, East Germany beat the USSR 23–22 in the handball final.
- In the women's tournament, the USSR won all its matches and retained the Olympic handball title. Yugoslavia and East Germany gained silver and bronze medal respectively.

=== Field hockey ===
- Six countries competed in the women's field hockey: Austria, India, Poland, Czechoslovakia, USSR, and Zimbabwe. The gold medal was won by the team of Zimbabwe. Zimbabwe did not learn it would get a place in the tournament until 35 days before the Games began, and chose its team only the weekend before the opening ceremony. None of their players had prior playing experience on an artificial surface. Soviet Union won bronze.
- India won a record eighth title in men's field hockey. The Soviet Union won bronze.

=== Judo ===
- The USSR topped judo with five medals (two gold, one silver and two bronze). France came second (two gold, one silver and a bronze) and East Germany came third (one gold and four bronze). A traditional powerhouse Japan was absent due to the boycott.

=== Modern pentathlon ===
- In the modern pentathlon, George Horvath (Sweden) recorded a perfect score in the pistol shoot. It had been achieved only once before in 1936.

=== Rowing ===
- East Germany dominated rowing, winning eleven of the fourteen titles. The East German men won seven out of eight events, foiled from achieving a clean sweep by Pertti Karppinen of Finland (who defended his Olympic title from Montreal). East German women won four of their six events.
- In the rowing eights with coxswain, the British team won silver just 0.74 seconds behind East Germany.

=== Sailing ===
- The sailing event was held in Tallinn, Soviet-occupied Estonia.
- Soviet sailor Valentyn Mankin won a gold medal in "Star" class. He won Olympic champion titles in "Finn" and "Tempest" classes before, and remains the only sailor in Olympic history to win gold medals in three different classes as of 2007.

=== Shooting ===
- The three-day skeet shooting marathon was won by Hans Kjeld Rasmussen of Denmark.
- In the smallbore rifle, prone event, Hungarian Károly Varga captured the gold and equalled the world record.

=== Swimming ===
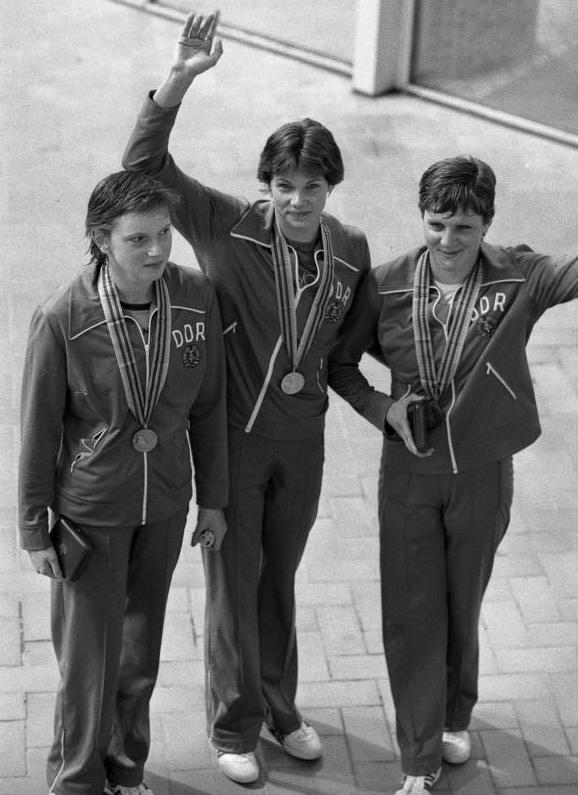
Rica Reinisch with her gold medal in 200 m swimming.

- Vladimir Salnikov (USSR) won three gold medals in swimming. He became the first man in history to break the 15-minute barrier in the 1500 metre freestyle, swimming's equivalent of breaking the four-minute mile. He missed the 1984 Games because of the boycott but won gold again in this event at Seoul 1988.
- Salnikov also won gold in the 4 × 200 m relay and the 400m freestyle. In the 400m freestyle, he set a new Olympic record which was just eleven-hundredths of a second outside his own world record.
- In the Montreal final of the 400m freestyle, the seventh and eighth place finalists finished in over four minutes. In Moscow sixteen swimmers finished in under four minutes and eight of them did not make the final.
- Duncan Goodhew of Great Britain won the 100 metres breaststroke.
- Sweden's Bengt Baron won gold in the 100 meter backstroke.
- In the men's 4 × 100 metres medley relay, each of the eight teams taking part in the final broke its country's national record.
- The first Australian gold since 1972 came in the 4 × 100 men's medley relay, with Neil Brooks swimming the final leg, the Australians swam the second-fastest time in history.
- East German women dominated the swimming events, winning nine of eleven individual titles, both the relays and setting 6 world records. They also won all three medals in six different races. In total they won 26 of the available 35 medals. As it was revealed later, their results were aided by the state-sponsored doping system.
- Barbara Krause (East Germany) became the first woman to go under 55 seconds for the 100 m freestyle.
- Backstroker Rica Reinisch (East Germany) was 20th in the world rankings for 100m in 1979 and not in the top 100 for the 200 m. At the Olympics she broke the world records in both distances winning golds.
- In the 100m butterfly, Caren Metschuck (East Germany) beats her more experienced teammate Andrea Pollack to win gold.
- Petra Schneider (East Germany) shaved three seconds off the world record in the 400m medley.
- As in Montreal, the Soviet women made a clean sweep of the medals in the 200m breaststroke. The title in this event was won by Lina Kačiušytė.
- Michelle Ford (Australia) won the 800m freestyle more than four seconds ahead of her East German rivals.
- In swimming, 230 national, 22 Olympic and ten World records were set.
- The youngest male gold medallist of these Olympics was Hungarian backstroke swimmer Sándor Wladár at 17 years old.

=== Volleyball ===
- The prominent nation in both volleyball competitions was the USSR; its teams won both golds.

=== Water polo ===
- Hungary won a bronze medal in water polo. This continued their run of always winning a medal in this event since 1928.

=== Weightlifting ===
- The standard of weightlifting was the highest in the history of the Olympics. There were eighteen senior world records, two junior world records, more than 100 Olympic records and 108 national records set.
- The oldest of weightlifting's Olympic records – the snatch in the lightweight class set in 1964 – was bettered thirteen times.
- Yurik Vardanyan (USSR) became the first middleweight to total more than 400 kg, he won gold.
- In the super heavyweight class, Vasily Alexeyev (USSR) Olympic champion at Munich and Montreal, eight-time world champion, who in his career set 80 world records, failed to medal.
- Soviet weightlifters won 5 golds.
- The new category in weightlifting – up to 100 kg – was won by Ota Zaremba of Czechoslovakia.

=== Wrestling ===
- In Greco-Roman wrestling, Ferenc Kocsis of Hungary was declared the winner of the 163 pound class when the defending champion Anatoly Bykov was disqualified for passivity.
- Soviet wrestlers won 12 golds.

== Closing ceremony ==
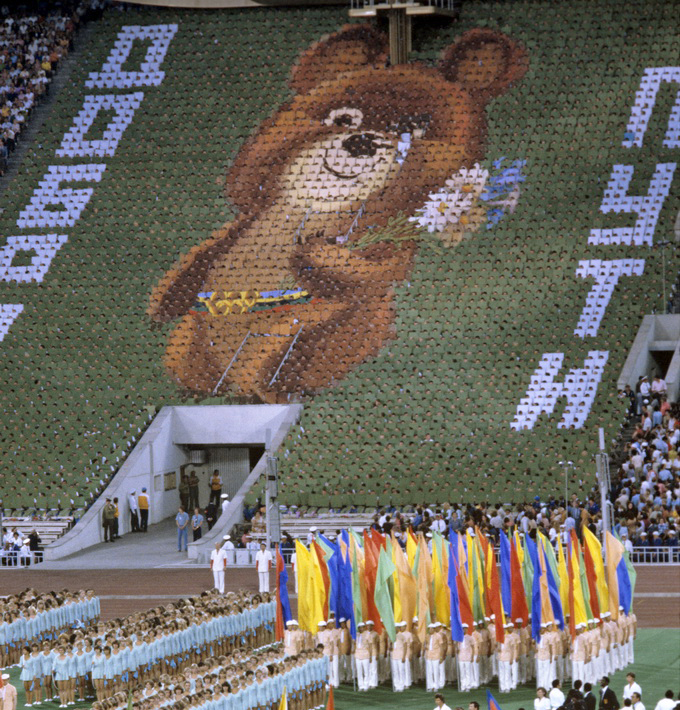
Misha, the mascot, formed in a mosaic as a tear runs down his face during the closing ceremony

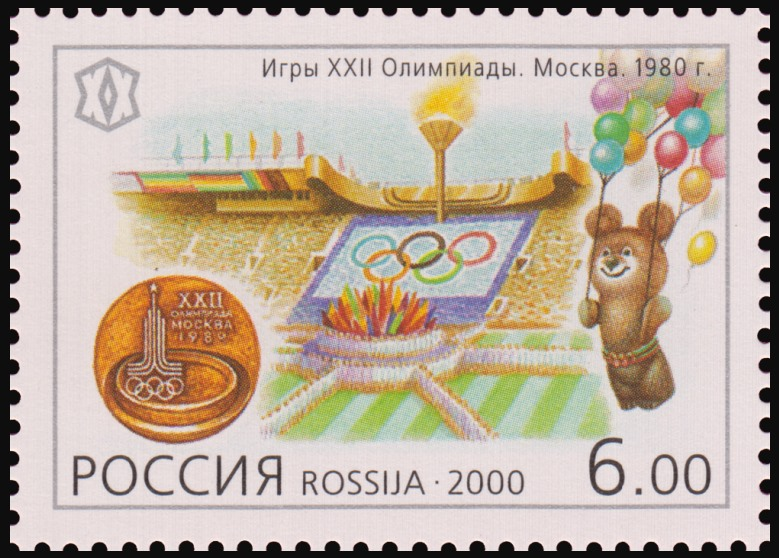
Misha carried by balloons into the sky, commemorated by a 2000 postage stamp issued by Russia

Because of the U.S. boycott, changes were made to the traditional elements of the closing ceremony that represent the handover to the host city of the next Summer Olympics in Los Angeles. Among them, the flag of the city of Los Angeles instead of the United States flag was raised, and the Olympic Anthem instead of the national anthem of the United States was played. There was also no "Antwerp Ceremony", where the ceremonial Olympic flag was transferred from the Mayor of Moscow to the Mayor of Los Angeles; instead the flag was kept by the Moscow city authorities until 1984. Furthermore, there was no next host city presentation.

Both the opening and closing ceremonies were shown in Yuri Ozerov's 1981 film Oh, Sport – You Are The World! (Russian: О спорт, ты – мир!).

== Venues ==
- Central Lenin Stadium area
  - Grand Arena^{2} – opening/closing ceremonies, athletics, football (final), equestrian (jumping individual)
  - Minor Arena^{2} – volleyball
  - Swimming Pool^{2} – water polo
  - Sports Palace^{2} – gymnastics, judo
  - Druzhba Multipurpose Arena^{1} – volleyball
  - Streets of Moscow – Athletics (20 & 50 km walk, marathon)
- Olympiysky Sports Complex
  - Indoor Stadium^{1} – basketball (final), boxing
  - Swimming Pool^{1} – swimming, diving, modern pentathlon (swimming), water polo (final)
- CSKA (Central Sports Club of the Army) Sports Complex
  - CSKA Athletics Fieldhouse, Central Sports Club of the Army^{1} – wrestling
  - CSKA Football Fieldhouse, Central Sports Club of the Army^{1} – fencing, modern pentathlon (fencing)
  - CSKA Palace of Sports^{1} – basketball
- Venues in metropolitan Moscow
  - Dynamo Central Stadium, Grand Arena^{2} – football preliminaries
  - Dynamo Central Stadium, Minor Arena^{2} – field hockey
  - Young Pioneers Stadium^{2} – field hockey (final)
  - Dynamo Palace of Sports^{1}, Khimki-Khovrino – handball
  - Trade Unions' Equestrian Complex^{1} – equestrian, modern pentathlon (riding, running)
  - Izmailovo Sports Palace^{1} – weightlifting
  - Sokolniki Sports Palace^{2} – handball (final)
  - Dynamo Shooting Range^{2}, Mytishchi – shooting, modern pentathlon (shooting)
- Krylatskoye Sports Complex
  - Krylatskoye Sports Complex Canoeing and Rowing Basin^{2}, Krylatskoye – canoeing, rowing
  - Krylatskoye Sports Complex Velodrome^{1}, Krylatskoye – cycling (track)
  - Krylatskoye Sports Complex Cycling Circuit – cycling (individual road race)
  - Krylatskoye Sports Complex Archery Field^{1}, Krylatskoye – archery
- Venues outside Moscow
  - Moscow-Minsk Highway – cycling (road team time trial)
  - Kirov Stadium^{2}, Leningrad, Russian SFSR – football preliminaries
  - Dinamo Stadium^{2}, Minsk, Byelorussian SSR – football preliminaries
  - Republican Stadium^{2}, Kiev, Ukrainian SSR – football preliminaries
  - Tallinn Olympic Yachting Centre^{1}, Tallinn, Estonian SSR – sailing

^{1} New facilities constructed in preparation for the Olympic Games. ^{2} Existing facilities modified or refurbished in preparation for the Olympic Games.

== Sports ==
The 1980 Summer Olympic programme featured 203 events in the following 21 sports:

- Aquatics
  - Diving (4)
  - Swimming (26)
  - Water polo (1)
- Archery (2)
- Athletics (38)
- Basketball (2)
- Boxing (11)
- Canoeing (11)
- Cycling
  - Road (2)
  - Track (4)
- Equestrian
  - Dressage (2)
  - Eventing (2)
  - Show jumping (2)
- Fencing (8)
- Football (1)
- Gymnastics (14)
- Handball (2)
- Field hockey (2)
- Judo (8)
- Modern pentathlon (2)
- Rowing (14)
- Sailing (6)
- Shooting (7)
- Volleyball (2)
- Weightlifting (10)
- Wrestling
  - Freestyle (10)
  - Greco-Roman (10)

== Calendar ==
All times are in Moscow Time (UTC+3)

●	Opening ceremony	Event competitions	●	Event finals	●	Closing ceremony

Date	July													August		
Date	19th Sat	20th Sun	21st Mon	22nd Tue	23rd Wed	24th Thu	25th Fri	26th Sat	27th Sun	28th Mon	29th Tue	30th Wed	31st Thu	1st Fri	2nd Sat	3rd Sun
Archery															● ●	
Athletics						● ● ●	● ● ●	● ● ● ● ●	● ● ● ●	● ● ● ● ●		● ● ● ● ●	● ● ●	● ● ● ● ● ● ● ● ● ●		
Basketball												● ●				
Boxing															● ● ● ● ● ● ● ● ● ● ●	
Canoeing														● ● ● ● ● ●	● ● ● ● ●	
Cycling		●		●		●		● ●		●						
Diving			●		●			●		●						
Equestrian									● ●		●		●	●		●
Fencing					●	●	●	●	●	●	●		●			
Field hockey											●		●			
Football (soccer)															●	
Gymnastics				●	●	● ●	● ● ● ● ● ● ● ● ● ●									
Handball											●	●				
Judo								●	●	●	●	●	●	●	●	
Modern pentathlon						● ●										
Rowing								● ● ● ● ● ●	● ● ● ● ● ● ● ●							
Sailing											● ● ● ● ● ●					
Shooting		●	●	●	●	●	●	●								
Swimming		● ●	● ● ● ●	● ● ●	● ● ● ●	● ● ● ●		● ● ● ●	● ● ● ● ●							
Volleyball											●			●		
Water polo											●					
Weightlifting		●	●	●	●	●		●	●	●	●	●				
Wrestling				● ● ●	● ● ●	● ● ● ●					● ● ●	● ● ●	● ● ● ●			
Total gold medals		5	7	10	12	19	15	22	22	10	16	14	11	19	20	1
Ceremonies	●															●
Date	19th Sat	20th Sun	21st Mon	22nd Tue	23rd Wed	24th Thu	25th Fri	26th Sat	27th Sun	28th Mon	29th Tue	30th Wed	31st Thu	1st Fri	2nd Sat	3rd Sun
Date	July													August		

== Medal count ==
This is a list of all nations that won medals at the 1980 Games.

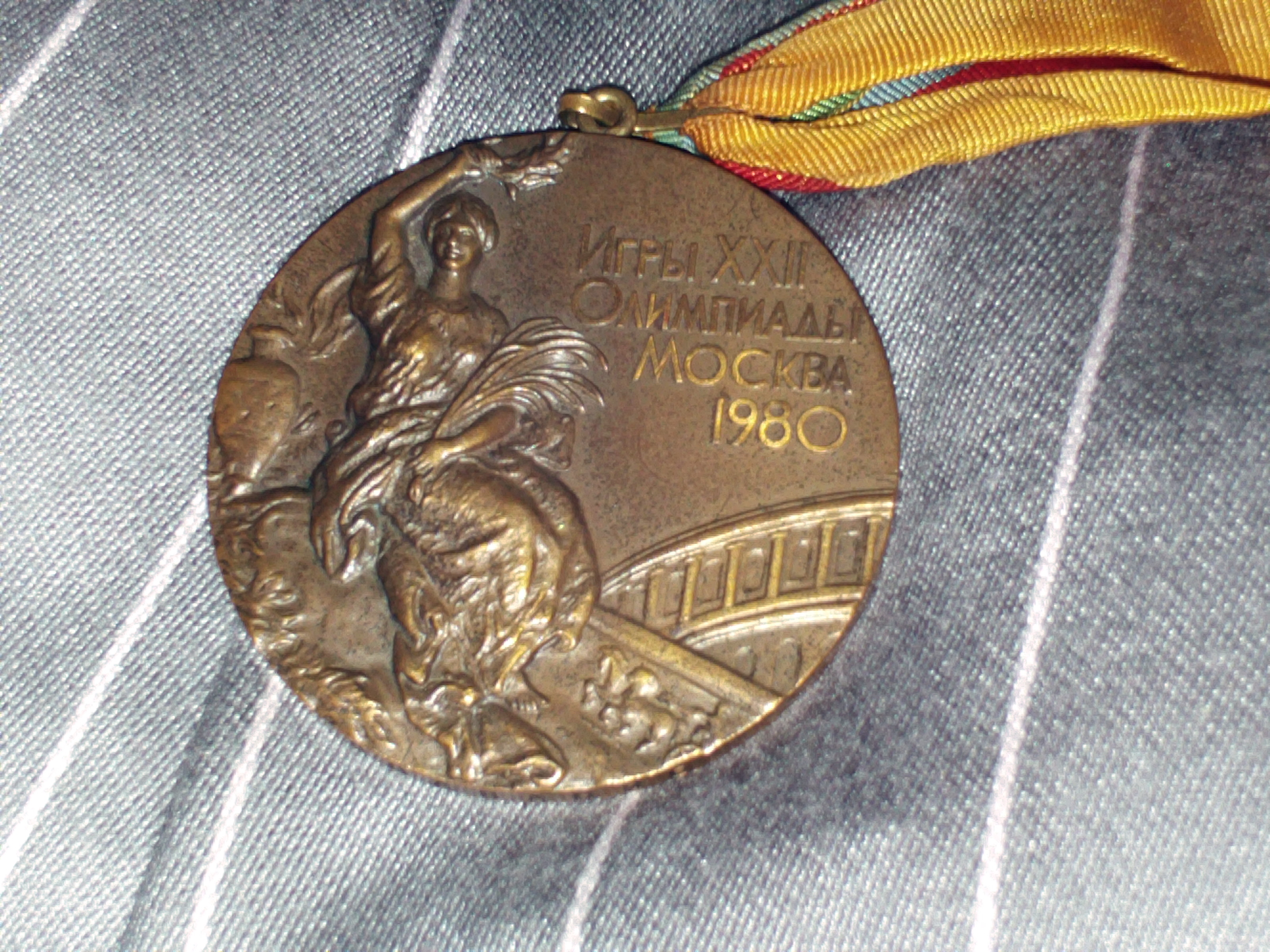
A "bronze" medal – actually tombac – from the 1980 Summer Olympics

* Host nation (Soviet Union)

1980 Summer Olympics medal table
Rank	NOC	Gold	Silver	Bronze	Total
1	Soviet Union*	80	69	46	195
2	East Germany	47	37	42	126
3	Bulgaria	8	16	17	41
4	Cuba	8	7	5	20
5	Italy	8	3	4	15
6	Hungary	7	10	15	32
7	Romania	6	6	13	25
8	France	6	5	3	14
9	Great Britain	5	7	9	21
10	Poland	3	14	15	32
11	Sweden	3	3	6	12
12	Finland	3	1	4	8
13	Czechoslovakia	2	3	9	14
14	Yugoslavia	2	3	4	9
15	Australia	2	2	5	9
16	Denmark	2	1	2	5
17	Brazil	2	0	2	4
17	Ethiopia	2	0	2	4
19	Switzerland	2	0	0	2
20	Spain	1	3	2	6
21	Austria	1	2	1	4
22	Greece	1	0	2	3
23	Belgium	1	0	0	1
23	India	1	0	0	1
23	Zimbabwe	1	0	0	1
26	North Korea	0	3	2	5
27	Mongolia	0	2	2	4
28	Tanzania	0	2	0	2
29	Mexico	0	1	3	4
30	Netherlands	0	1	2	3
31	Ireland	0	1	1	2
32	Uganda	0	1	0	1
32	Venezuela	0	1	0	1
34	Jamaica	0	0	3	3
35	Guyana	0	0	1	1
35	Lebanon	0	0	1	1
Totals (36 entries)		204	204	223	631

== List of participating countries and regions ==
In the following list, the number in parentheses indicates the number of athletes from each nation that competed in Moscow. Nations in italics competed under the Olympic flag (or, in the cases of New Zealand, Portugal and Spain, under the flags of their respective National Olympic Committees):

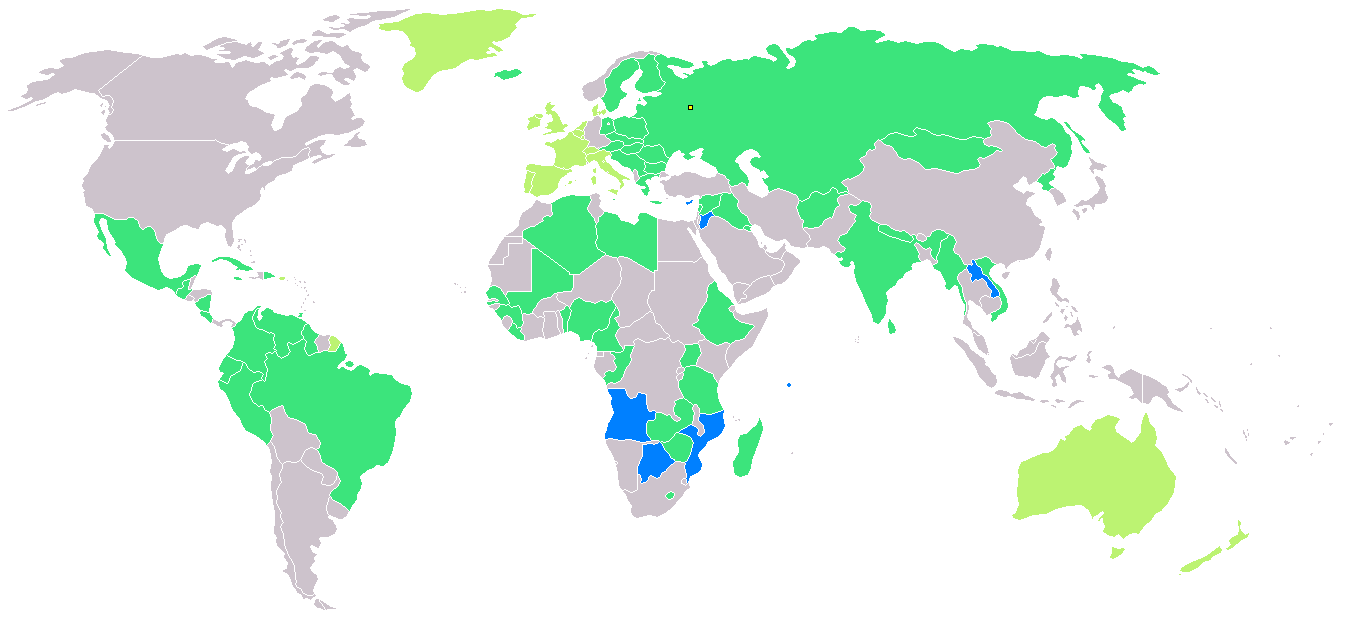
Participating nations

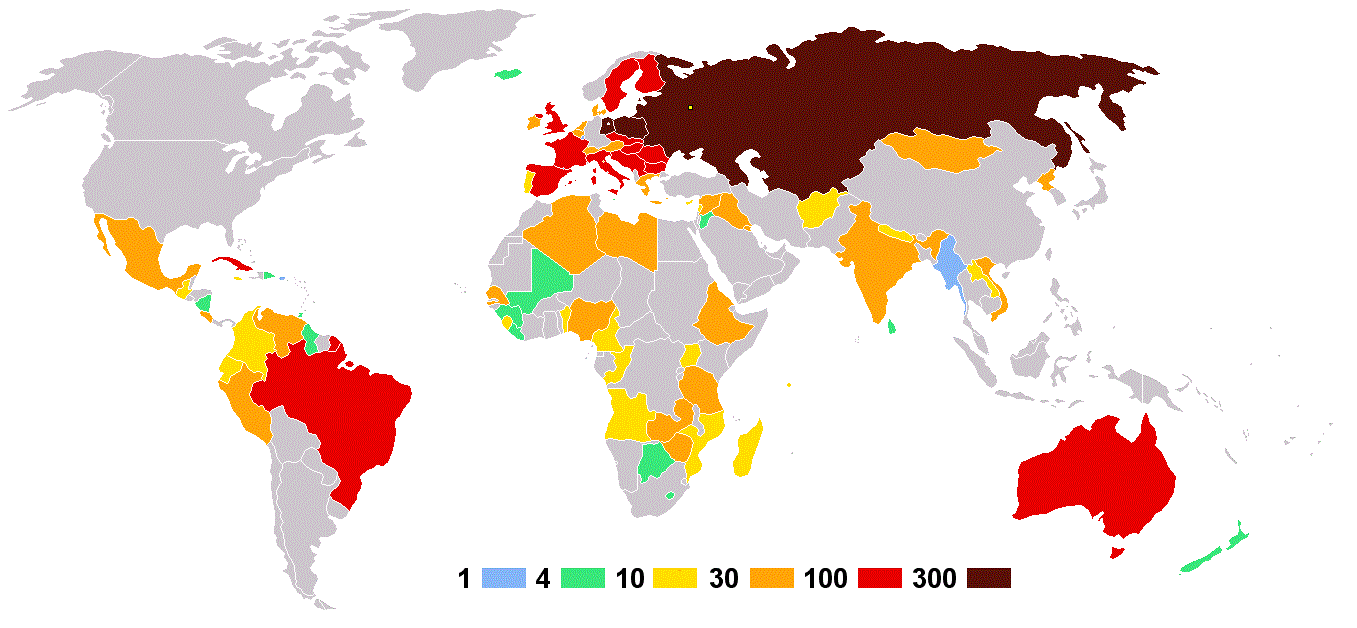
Number of athletes sent per nation. The rest of countries have boycotted the games.

Participating National Olympic Committees
- Afghanistan (11 athletes)
- Algeria (54)
- Andorra (2)
- Angola (11)
- Australia (120)
- Austria (83)
- Belgium (59)
- Benin (16)
- Botswana (7)
- Brazil (106)
- Bulgaria (271)
- Burma (2)
- Cameroon (25)
- Colombia (23)
- Republic of the Congo (23)
- Costa Rica (29)
- Cuba (208)
- Cyprus (14)
- Czechoslovakia (208)
- Denmark (58)
- Dominican Republic (6)
- Ecuador (12)
- Ethiopia (41)
- Finland (105)
- France (121)
- East Germany (346)
- Great Britain (219)
- Greece (41)
- Guatemala (10)
- Guinea (9)
- Guyana (8)
- Hungary (263)
- Iceland (9)
- India (72)
- Iraq (43)
- Ireland (47)
- Italy (159)
- Jamaica (18)
- Jordan (4)
- North Korea (47)
- Kuwait (56)
- Laos (19)
- Lebanon (15)
- Lesotho (5)
- Liberia
- Libya (29)
- Luxembourg (3)
- Madagascar (11)
- Mali (7)
- Malta (8)
- Mexico (45)
- Mongolia (43)
- Mozambique (14)
- Nepal (10)
- Netherlands (75)
- New Zealand (4)
- Nicaragua (5)
- Nigeria (44)
- Peru (28)
- Poland (306)
- Portugal (11)
- Puerto Rico (3)
- Romania (226)
- San Marino (16)
- Senegal (32)
- Seychelles (11)
- Sierra Leone (14)
- Spain (155)
- Sri Lanka (4)
- Sweden (145)
- Switzerland (73)
- Syria (67)
- Tanzania (41)
- Trinidad and Tobago (9)
- Uganda (13)
- Soviet Union (490) (host)
- Venezuela (37)
- Vietnam (30)
- Yugoslavia (164)
- Zambia (37)
- Zimbabwe (42)

Note: Liberia with seven athletes, withdrew after marching in the Opening Ceremony and took part in the boycott.

=== Number of athletes by National Olympic Committees ===
IOC Letter Code	Country	Athletes
AFG	Afghanistan	11
ALG	Algeria	54
AND	Andorra	2
ANG	Angola	11
AUS	Australia	120
AUT	Austria	83
BEL	Belgium	59
BEN	Benin	16
BOT	Botswana	7
BRA	Brazil	106
BUL	Bulgaria	271
BIR	Burma	2
CMR	Cameroon	25
COL	Colombia	23
CRC	Costa Rica	29
CUB	Cuba	208
CYP	Cyprus	14
TCH	Czechoslovakia	208
DEN	Denmark	58
DOM	Dominican Republic	6
ECU	Ecuador	12
ETH	Ethiopia	41
FIN	Finland	105
FRA	France	121
GDR	East Germany	346
GBR	Great Britain	219
GRE	Greece	41
GUA	Guatemala	10
GUI	Guinea	9
GUY	Guyana	8
HUN	Hungary	263
ISL	Iceland	9
IND	India	72
IRQ	Iraq	43
IRL	Ireland	47
ITA	Italy	159
JAM	Jamaica	18
JOR	Jordan	4
PRK	North Korea	47
KUW	Kuwait	56
LAO	Laos	19
LIB	Lebanon	15
LES	Lesotho	5
LBA	Libya	29
LUX	Luxembourg	3
MAD	Madagascar	11
MLI	Mali	7
MLT	Malta	8
MEX	Mexico	45
MGL	Mongolia	43
MOZ	Mozambique	14
NEP	Nepal	10
HOL	Netherlands	75
NZL	New Zealand	4
NCA	Nicaragua	5
NGR	Nigeria	44
PER	Peru	28
POL	Poland	306
POR	Portugal	11
PUR	Puerto Rico	3
ROM	Romania	226
SMR	San Marino	16
SEN	Senegal	32
SEY	Seychelles	11
SLE	Sierra Leone	14
ESP	Spain	155
SRI	Sri Lanka	4
SWE	Sweden	145
SUI	Switzerland	73
SYR	Syria	67
TAN	Tanzania	41
TRI	Trinidad and Tobago	9
UGA	Uganda	13
URS	Soviet Union	490
VEN	Venezuela	37
VIE	Vietnam	30
YUG	Yugoslavia	164
ZAM	Zambia	37
ZIM	Zimbabwe	42
Total		5,256

== See also ==
- 1980 Summer Paralympics
- 1980 Winter Paralympics
- 1980 Winter Olympics
- Olympic Games held in Russia
  - 1980 Summer Olympics – Moscow
  - 2014 Winter Olympics – Sochi
- Olympic Games with significant boycotts
  - 1976 Summer Olympics – Montreal – African boycott
  - 1980 Summer Olympics – Moscow – United States-led boycott
  - 1984 Summer Olympics – Los Angeles – Soviet-led boycott
- List of IOC country codes
- Use of performance-enhancing drugs in the Olympic Games – 1980 Moscow

== Notes ==
Summer Olympics
Preceded by Montreal	XXII Olympiad; Moscow; 1980	Succeeded by Los Angeles
