= List of Rio de Janeiro state symbols =

Location of the state of Rio de Janeiro in Brazil

The following is a list of symbols of the Brazilian state of Rio de Janeiro.

== State symbols ==
Type	Symbol	Date	Image
Coat of arms	Coat of arms of Rio de Janeiro	5 October 1965	
Flag	Flag of Rio de Janeiro	5 October 1965	
Song	Anthem of Rio de Janeiro	December 29 1889	
