= Flag of Rio de Janeiro (state) =

Rio de Janeiro

The flag of Rio de Janeiro is the official flag of the Brazilian state of Rio de Janeiro.

== History ==
The flag was officially instituted by State Law No. 5588 of 5 October 1965, and was unchanged following the state's merger with Guanabara a decade later.

== Gallery ==
Unofficial flag of the province of Rio de Janeiro in the Empire of Brazil

Flag of the State of Rio de Janeiro from 1891 to 1937 and 1947–1965, depicting a different version of the state coat of arms
