= Rio de Janeiro (state) =

State of Brazil

- State
- Flag Coat of arms
- Motto: Recte Rem Publicam Gerere (Latin) "Conduct the affairs of the public with righteousness"
- Anthem: Hino 15 de Novembro
- Location in Brazil
- Coordinates (Brazil): 22°54′S 43°12′W
- Country: Brazil
- Region: Southeast
- Capital and largest city: Rio de Janeiro

Government
  - Type: Unitary state
  - Governor: Ricardo Couto (interim)
  - Vice Governor: Vacant
  - Senators: Carlos Portinho (PL); Flávio Bolsonaro (PL); Romário Faria (Ind.)
  - Legislature: Legislative Assembly of Rio de Janeiro

Area
  - Total: 43,696.1 km^{2} (16,871.2 sq mi)
  - Rank: 24th

Population (2022 Census)
  - Total: 16,055,174
  - Estimate (2024): 17,219,679
  - Rank: 3rd
  - Density: 367.428/km^{2} (951.634/sq mi)
  - Rank: 2nd
- Demonym: Fluminense

GDP (2024)
  - Total: R$1.242 trillion (US$230.472 billion)
- Time zone: UTC-3 (BRT)
- Postal Code: 20000-000 to 28990-000
- ISO 3166 code: BR-RJ
- HDI (2024): 0.819 (5th) – very high
- Website: www.rj.gov.br

Rio de Janeiro (Brazilian Portuguese pronunciation: [ˈʁi.u d(ʒi) ʒɐˈne(j)ɾu]) (Note: In the variety of Brazilian Portuguese spoken in Rio de Janeiro, according to Larousse Concise Dictionary: Portuguese-English, 2008, p. 339 (in which the pronunciations "refletem a língua falada no Rio de Janeiro" [reflect the language as spoken in Rio de Janeiro]).), officially the State of Rio de Janeiro (Portuguese: Estado do Rio de Janeiro), is one of the 27 federative units of Brazil. It has the second largest economy of Brazil, with the largest being that of the state of São Paulo. The state, which has 8.2% of the Brazilian population, is responsible for 9.2% of the Brazilian GDP.

The state of Rio de Janeiro is located within the Brazilian geopolitical region classified as the Southeast (assigned by IBGE). Rio de Janeiro shares borders with all the other states in the same Southeast macroregion: Minas Gerais (N and NW), Espírito Santo (NE) and São Paulo (SW). It is bounded on the east and south by the South Atlantic Ocean. Rio de Janeiro has an area of 43,653 km^{2} (16,855 sq mi). Its capital and most populous city is the city of Rio de Janeiro, which was the capital of the Portuguese Colony of Brazil from 1763 to 1815, of the following United Kingdom of Portugal, Brazil and the Algarves from 1815 to 1822, and of later independent Brazil as a kingdom and republic from 1822 to 1960.

The state is divided into 92 municipalities. The state's 22 largest cities are Rio de Janeiro, São Gonçalo, Duque de Caxias, Nova Iguaçu, Niterói, Campos dos Goytacazes, Belford Roxo, São João de Meriti, Petrópolis, Volta Redonda, Magé, Macaé, Itaboraí, Cabo Frio, Armação dos Búzios, Angra dos Reis, Nova Friburgo, Barra Mansa, Barra do Piraí, Teresópolis, Mesquita and Nilópolis.

Rio de Janeiro is the smallest state by area in the Southeast macroregion and one of the smallest in Brazil. It is, however, the third most populous Brazilian state, with a population of over 16 million people at the 2022 Census (making it the most densely populated state in Brazil), and it has the third longest coastline in the country (after those of the states of Bahia and Maranhão).

In the Brazilian flag, the state is represented by Mimosa, the beta star in the Southern Cross (β Cru).

== Etymology ==
Guanabara Bay was first encountered by Europeans on January 1, 1502, when Portuguese explorers Gaspar de Lemos and Gonçalo Coelho arrived on its shores. According to some historians, the name given by the exploration team to the bay was originally Ria de Janeiro ("January Ria"). Then confusion took place between the words ria and rio ("river"). As a result, the name of the bay was soon fixed as Rio de Janeiro.

=== Demonym ===
The demonym for the State of Rio de Janeiro is fluminense, from Latin flumen, fluminis, meaning "river". While carioca is an older term, first attested in 1502, fluminense was sanctioned in 1783, twenty years after the city had become the capital of the Brazilian colonies, as the official demonym of the Royal Captaincy of Rio de Janeiro and subsequently of the Province of Rio de Janeiro. From 1783 through the Imperial Regime, carioca remained an unofficial term which other Brazilians used for the inhabitants of the city as well as the province. During the first years of the Brazilian Republic, carioca came to be the name given to those who lived in the city's slums or a pejorative used to refer to the bureaucratic elite of the Federal District. Only when the city lost its status as Federal District (to Brasília) and became the State of Guanabara in 1960 did carioca become an official demonym along with guanabarino. In 1975, Guanabara State was incorporated into Rio de Janeiro State, becoming the present City of Rio de Janeiro. Carioca became the demonym of the city, while fluminense continues to be used for the state as a whole.

== History ==
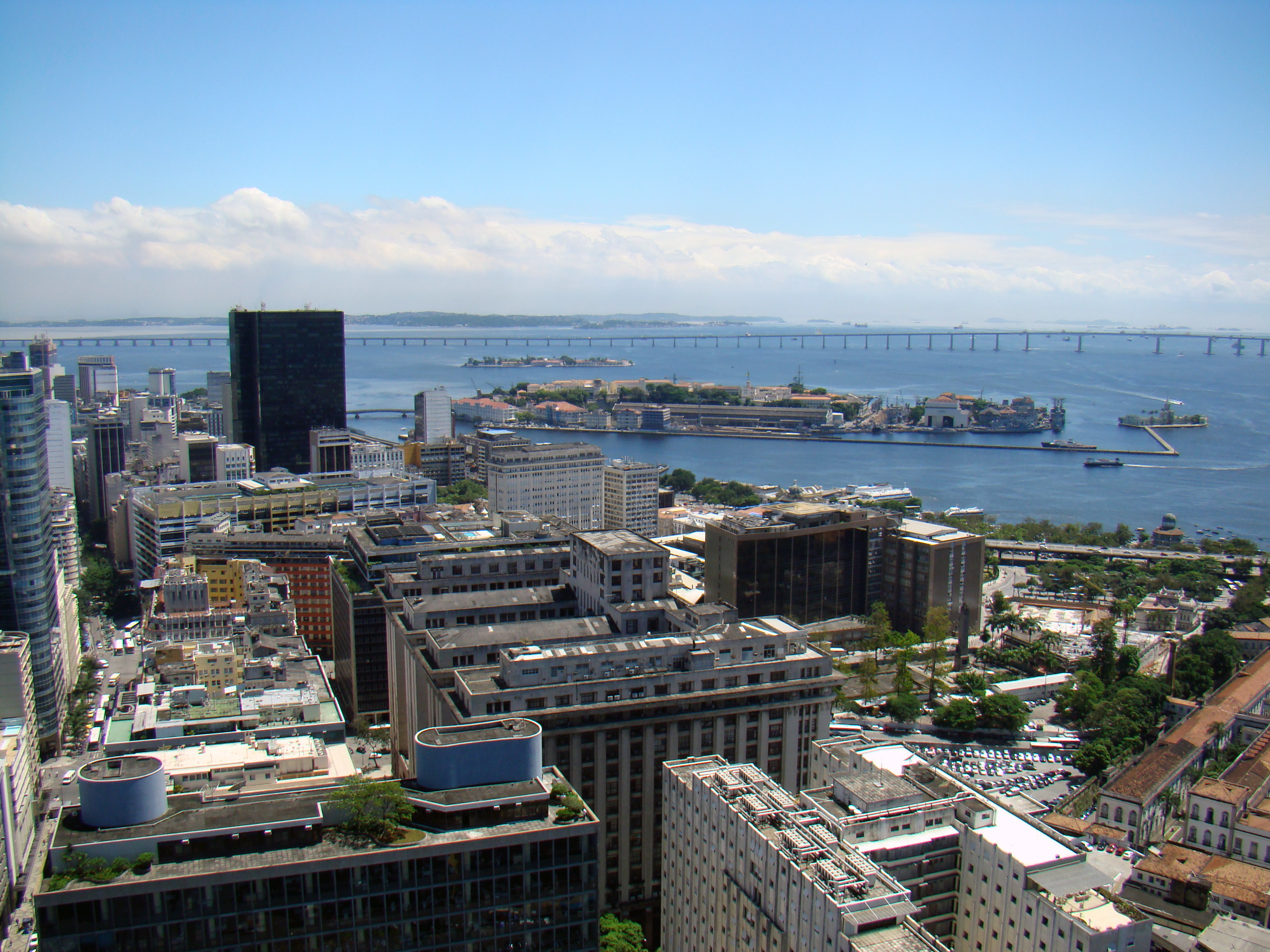
Rio de Janeiro, the capital city of the State of Rio de Janeiro

=== Hereditary captainships ===
European presence in Rio de Janeiro dates back to 1502. Rio de Janeiro originated from parts of the captainships of de Tomé and São Vicente. Between 1555 and 1567, the territory was occupied by the French, who intended to install a colony, France Antarctique. Aiming to prevent the occupation of the Frenchmen, in March 1565, the city of Rio de Janeiro was established by Estácio de Sá.

In the 17th century, cattle raising and sugar cane cultivation stimulated the city's progress, which was definitively assured when the port started to export gold extracted from Minas Gerais in the 18th century. In 1763, Rio de Janeiro became the capital of Colonial Brazil. With the flight of the Portuguese royal family from Portugal to Brazil in 1808, the region soon benefited from urban reforms to house the Portuguese. Chief among the promoted changes were the transformation of agencies of public administration and justice, the creation of new churches and hospitals, the foundation of the first bank of the country (the Bank of Brazil) and the Royal Press, with the Gazette do Rio of Janeiro. The following years witnessed the creation of the Jardim Botânico (Botanical Garden) and the Royal Military Academy.

There followed a process of cultural enhancement influenced not only by the arrival of the royal family, but also by the presence of European graphic artists who were hired to record the society and Brazilian natural features. During this same time, The Royal School of Sciences, Arts, and Works was founded as well.

=== The neutral city ===
In 1834, the city of Rio de Janeiro was transformed into a "neutral city", remaining as capital of the state, while the captainships became provinces, with headquarters in Niterói, a neighbouring city. In 1889, the city became the capital of the Republic, the neutral city became the federal district and the province a state. In 1894, Petrópolis became the capital of Rio de Janeiro, until 1902 when Niterói recovered its capital status. With the relocation of the federal capital to Brasília in 1960, the city of Rio de Janeiro became Guanabara State. Niterói remained the state capital for Rio de Janeiro state, while Rio de Janeiro served the same status for Guanabara.

=== The new state of Rio de Janeiro ===
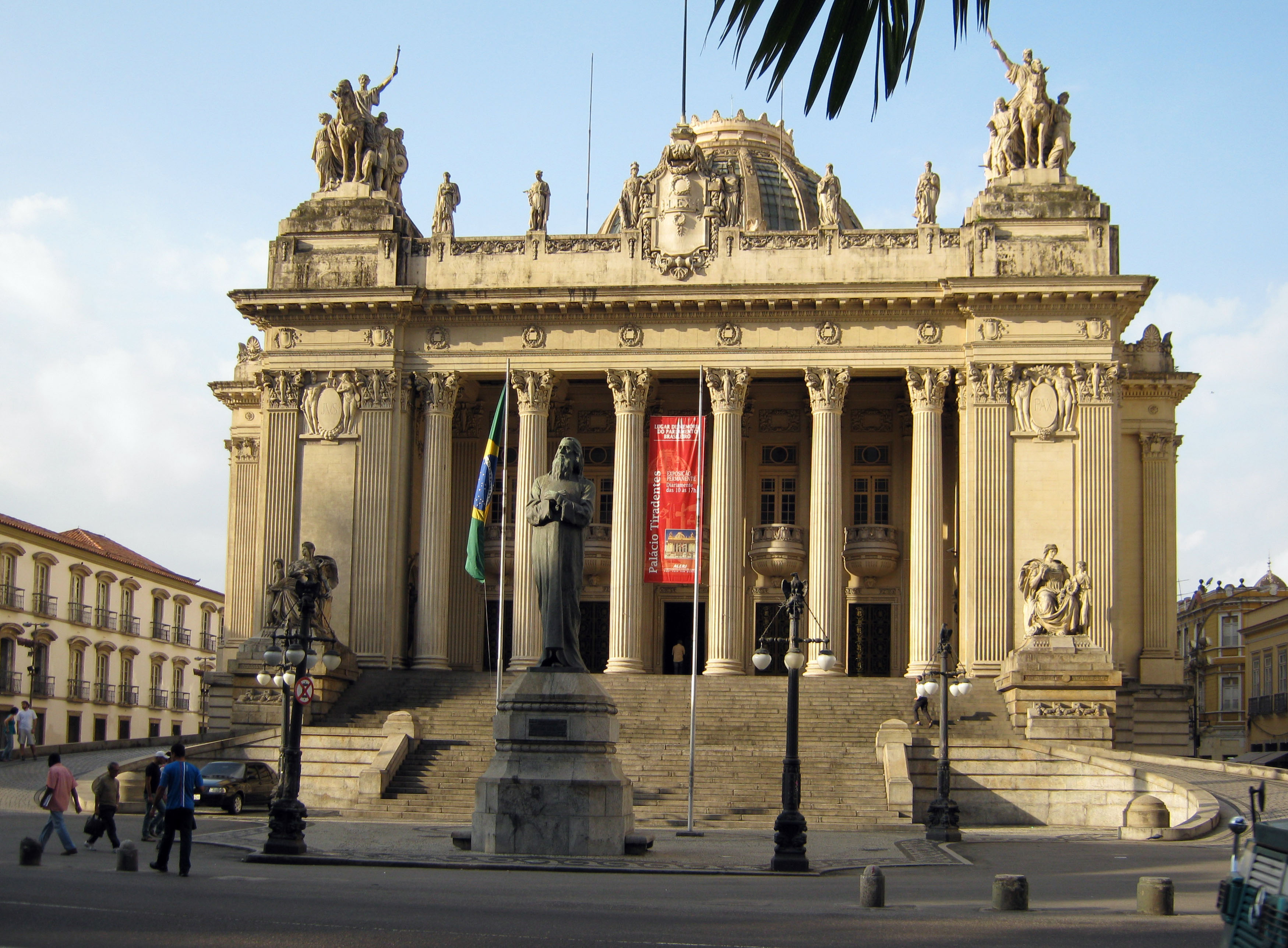
Tiradentes Palace, seat of the Legislative Assembly of Rio de Janeiro

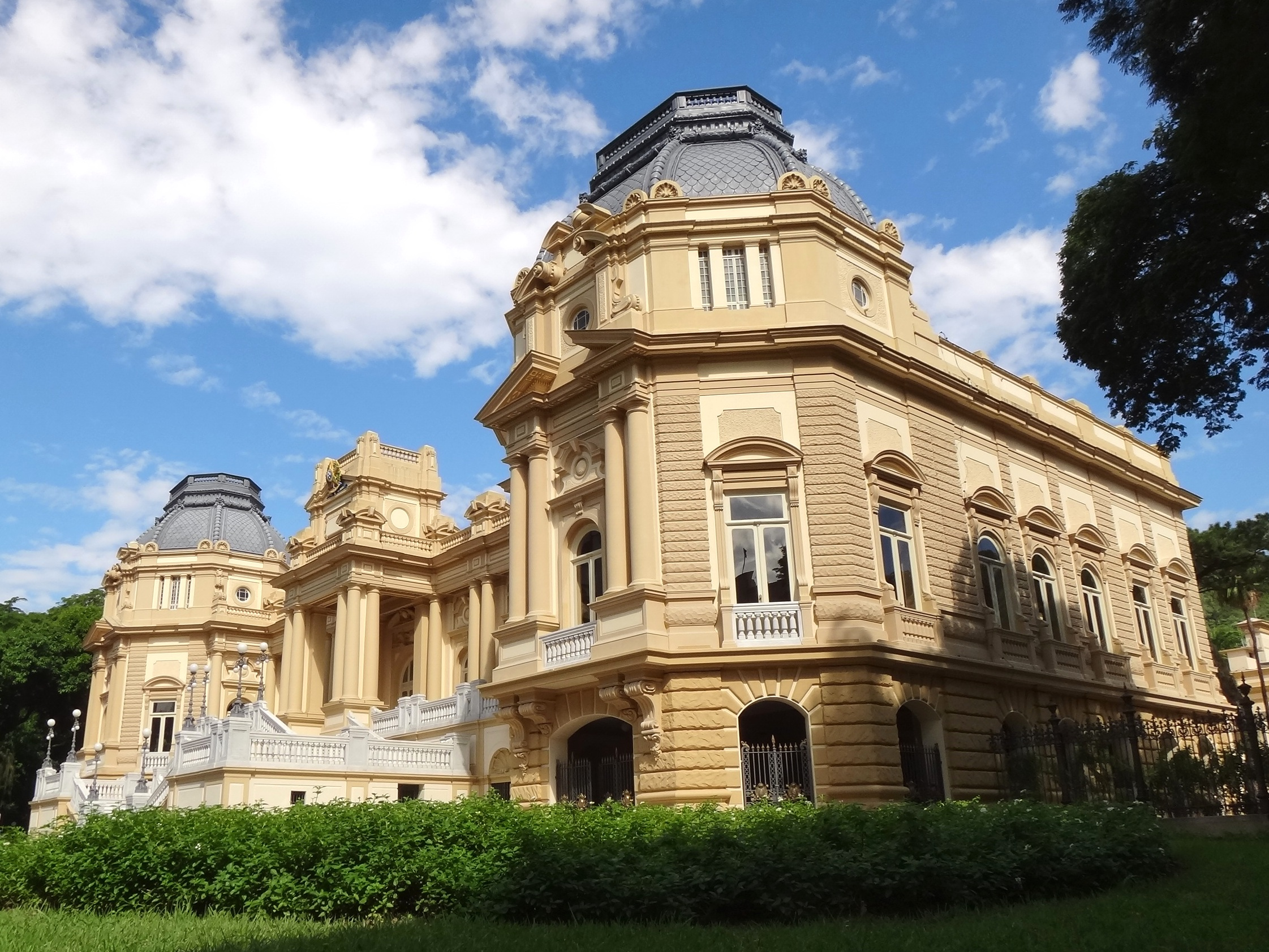
Guanabara Palace, seat of the state government

In 1975, a further change took place, with the merger of the states of Rio de Janeiro and the state of Guanabara, restoring the then city-state to the status of a municipality, governed by mayors.

In the 1970s, with the transfer of the capital to Brasilia, Rio de Janeiro began to be one of the worst states in the country in terms of economic dynamism. There was no political discussion about the course of the city after it ceased to be the country's capital. "Rio de Janeiro was a job hanger for politicians from all over Brazil. Everyone referred a friend, a relative to take a position in the federal district," explains Marieta de Moraes Ferreira, history professor at UFRJ. Left-wing governors and mayors such as Leonel Brizola, Saturnino Braga, Marcello Allencar, César Maia, Anthony Garotinho, and Benedita da Silva, among others, helped drive away many industries that still existed in the state. Combined with the incitement to favelas, where Brizola said for example that "the favela is not a problem, the favela is a solution", the capital has deteriorated in a few decades, dragging down the State. The state still maintains itself as the largest oil producer in Brazil (80% of the total), where royalties and special participations brought the state 4.2 billion reais in 2014, when the barrel of oil reached $93.48. But oil revenues, used by the government to repay financing debts, including the payroll of idle workers, fell to 1.6 billion reais. The international price of a barrel fell to USD 50.48 in 2016 and reached a low of USD 28. Petrobras became the target of the largest anti-corruption operation in Brazil, with the participation of governors such as Sérgio Cabral Filho and Pezão, linked to leftist Luiz Inácio Lula da Silva, pushing back investments that were to be at the forefront of the pre-salt exploration. Even when state municipalities received millions of reais in royalties, public spending was used for marginal improvements, for beautification, such as porcelain floors, whale-shaped monuments, without generating revenue or benefit. jobs for the population. Political leaders are blamed for the lack of a unified project for Rio de Janeiro's economy.

== Geography ==
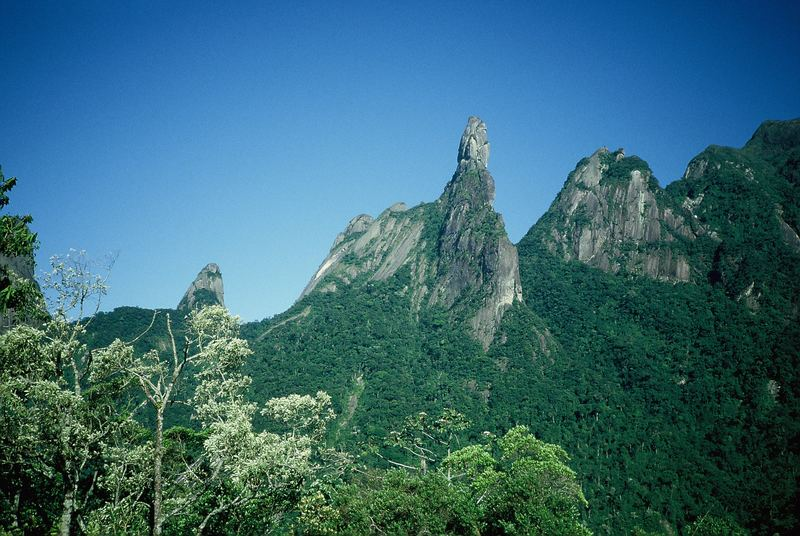
Serra dos Órgãos National Park

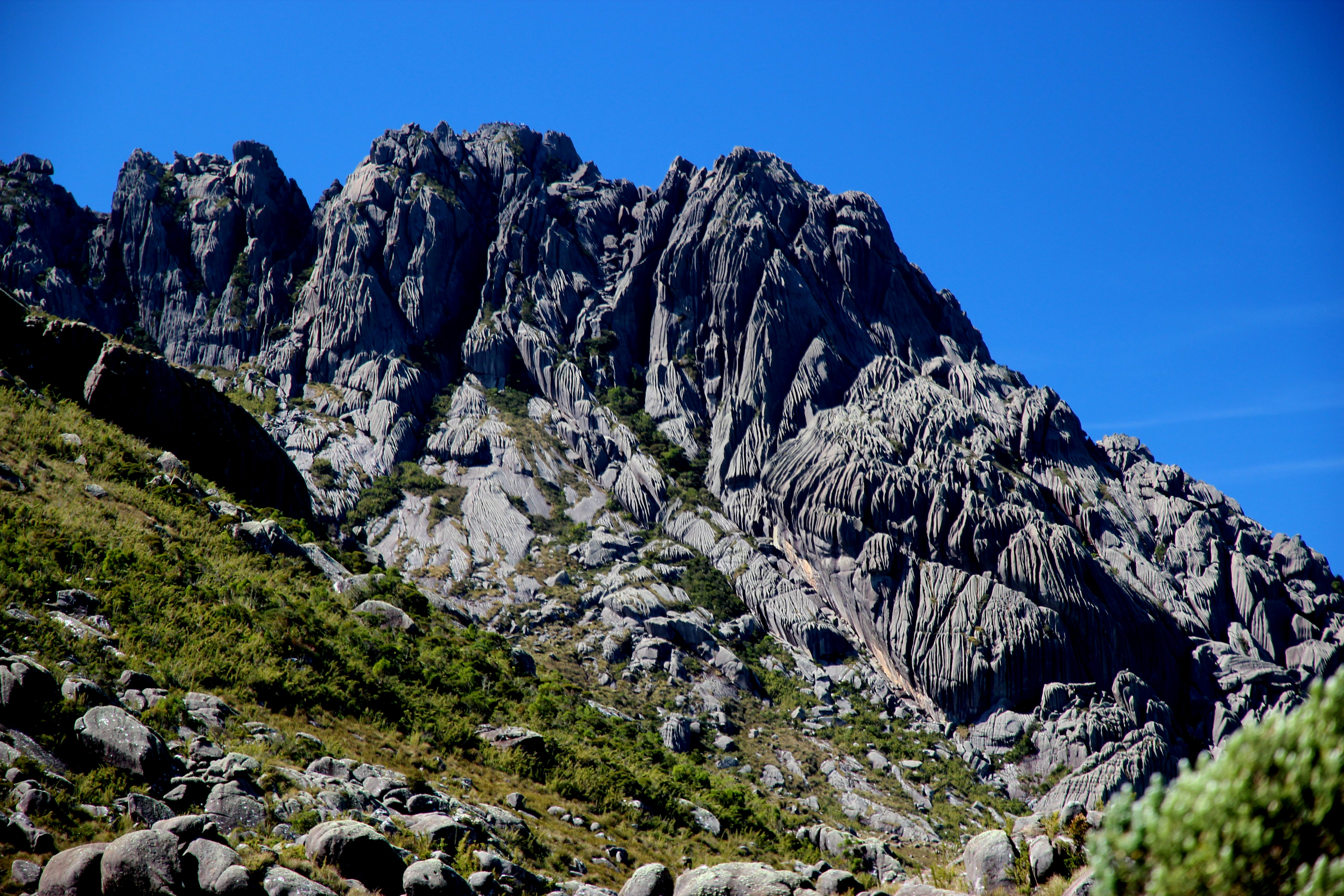
Pico das Agulhas Negras

The state is part of the Mata Atlântica biome and is made up of two distinct morphological areas: a coastal plain, known as baixada, and a plateau, which are disposed in parallel fashion from the shoreline on the Atlantic Ocean inland towards Minas Gerais.

The coastline extends 635 kilometers and is formed by the bays of Guanabara, Sepetiba, and Ilha Grande. There are prominent slopes near the ocean, featuring also diverse environments, such as restinga vegetation, bays, lagoons and tropical forests.

Most of the state however consists of highlands, often higher than 1000 m, formed by several mountain chains like the Serra do Mar which separates Rio from the state of São Paulo. The highest point of the state, the Pico das Agulhas Negras (Black Needles Peak) is located in the Serra da Mantiqueira which forms the physical border with neighbouring Minas Gerais.

Its principal rivers are the Guandu, the Piraí, the Paraíba do Sul, the Macaé and the Muriaé.

=== Climate ===
Climate types of Rio de Janeiro

The entire state is located within the tropics (the Tropic of Capricorn passes just a few kilometers south of the state's southernmost point) so a tropical climate is predominant. However, due to altitude, temperatures can drop to freezing point or below in some parts. Frost is not uncommon in some mountainous cities such as Teresópolis, Nova Friburgo and Petrópolis and snow has been reported occasionally in the Itatiaia National Park.

Annual mean temperatures on the coast are around 23 °C (73 °F), 26 °C (79 °F) in summer and 20 °C (68 °F) in winter. In the mountains annual mean temperatures are around 18 °C (64 °F) but can range from 20 °C (68 °F) at an elevation of 600 to 700 metres (2,000 to 2,300 ft) above sea level to 7 °C (45 °F) in the Itatiaia National Park. Summers in these areas tend to be warm but not hot, with averages around 22 °C (72 °F). Winters are quite chilly by Brazilian standards with lows around 8 to 9 °C (46 to 48 °F).

Rains tend to be concentrated in the summer (December to March) with a dry season in the winter (June to September). Most of the state receives between 1,000 and 1,500 millimetres (39 and 59 in) of rainfall in a year.

== Demographics ==
According to the IBGE of 2022, there were 16,055,174 people residing in the state. The population density was 36,697 inhabitants per square kilometre (95,040/sq mi).

Historical population
Year	Pop.	±%
1872	1,057,696	—
1890	1,399,535	+32.3%
1900	1,737,478	+24.1%
1920	2,717,244	+56.4%
1940	3,611,998	+32.9%
1950	4,674,645	+29.4%
1960	6,709,891	+43.5%
1970	9,110,324	+35.8%
1980	11,489,797	+26.1%
1991	12,783,761	+11.3%
2000	14,392,106	+12.6%
2010	15,989,929	+11.1%
2022	16,055,174	+0.4%

The last PNAD (National Household Survey) census revealed the following numbers: 6,739,901 White people (42.0%), 6,682,740 Pardo (Multiracial) people (41.6%), 2,594,253 Black people (16.2%), 21,837 Asian people (0.1%), 15,904 Amerindian people (0.1%).

People of Portuguese ancestry predominate in most of the state. The Brazilian census of 1920 showed that 39,74% of the Portuguese who lived in Brazil lived in Rio de Janeiro. Including all of the Rio de Janeiro, the proportion raised to 46,30% of the Portuguese who lived in Brazil. The numerical presence of the Portuguese was extremely high, accounting for 72% of the foreigners who lived in the capital. Portuguese born people accounted for 20,36% of the population of Rio, and those with a Portuguese father or a Portuguese mother accounted for 30,84%. In other words, native born Portuguese and their children accounted for 51,20% of the inhabitants of Rio, or a total of 267664 people in 1890.

Other European ethnic groups, such as Swiss, Finnish and Germans settled mostly in the mountainous areas (Nova Friburgo, Petrópolis, etc.) and in the capital. Italians and Spaniards are also present in the capital as well as in the surrounding cities.

=== Largest cities ===
Largest cities or towns in Rio de Janeiro (2011 census by the Brazilian Institute of Geography and Statistics)
Rank		Mesoregion	Pop.	Rank		Mesoregion	Pop.
1	Rio de Janeiro	Metropolitana	6 355 949	11	Magé	Metropolitana	228 972
2	São Gonçalo	Metropolitana	1 008 064	12	Itaboraí	Metropolitana	220 351
3	Duque de Caxias	Metropolitana	861 157	13	Macaé	Norte Fluminense	212 433
4	Nova Iguaçu	Metropolitana	799 047	14	Nova Friburgo	Centro Fluminense	209 747
5	Niterói	Metropolitana	489 720	15	Cabo Frio	Baixadas Litorâneas	190 747
6	Belford Roxo	Metropolitana	472 008	16	Barra Mansa	Sul Fluminense	178 355
7	Campos dos Goytacazes	Norte Fluminense	468 086	17	Angra dos Reis	Sul Fluminense	173 369
8	São João de Meriti	Metropolitana	459 379	18	Mesquita	Metropolitana	168 966
9	Petrópolis	Metropolitana	296 565	19	Teresópolis	Metropolitana	165 716
10	Volta Redonda	Sul Fluminense	259 011	20	Nilópolis	Metropolitana	157 710

Rio de Janeiro state population pyramid in 2021

Racial groups of Rio de Janeiro in 2022
1. White (42.0%)
2. Multiracial (41.6%)
3. African (16.2%)
4. East Asian (0.13%)
5. Indigenous (0.10%)

=== Religion ===
Religion in Rio de Janeiro (2022)
1. Catholicism (38.9%)
2. Protestantism (32.0%)
3. Spiritism (3.50%)
4. Umbanda and Candomblé (2.60%)
5. Other (5.80%)
6. No religion (16.9%)

According to the 2010 Brazilian census, there were 7,324,315 Roman Catholics (45.8%), 4,696,906 Protestants (29.4%), 647,572 Spiritists (4%), and 2,416,303 people without religion (14.6%). There are also adherents of Islam, Judaism, Buddhism, Hinduism, esoterism, neo-paganism, afro-Brazilian religions and Asian religions. Together, the adherents of these and other minorities constitute 6.2% of Rio de Janeiro's population.

The 2022 Brazilian census recorded that there were 5,503,882 Roman Catholics (38.9%), 4,526,166 Protestants (32.0%), 499,189 Spiritists (3.5%), and 365,452 practitioners of Umbanda and Candomblé (2.6%). A total of 828,098 people (5.9%) practiced other religions, while 2,338,904 people (16.9%) stated that they had no religion.

=== Education ===
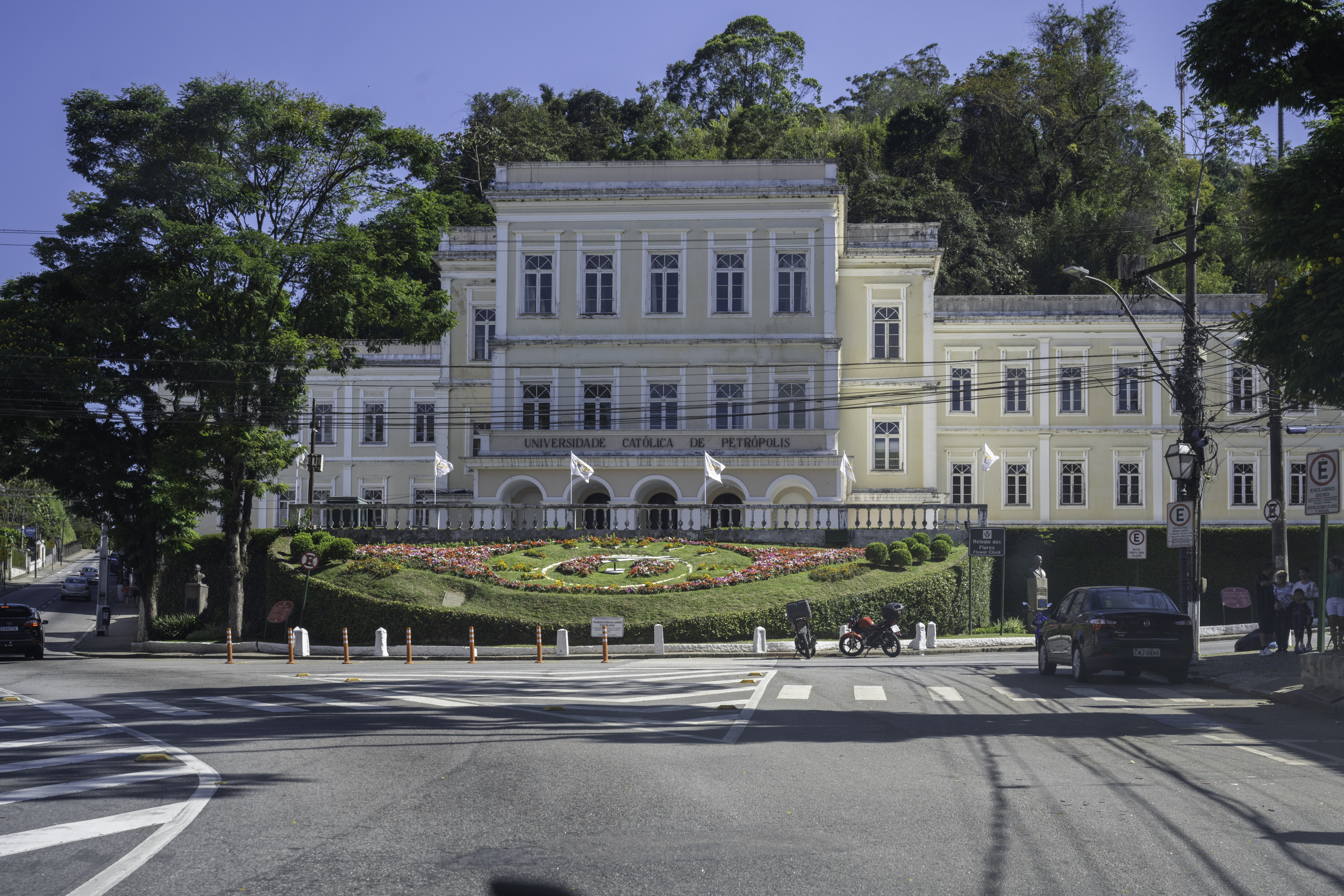
Catholic University of Petrópolis (UCP)

The state of Rio de Janeiro has the 4th best education in Brazil, second only to the Federal District, São Paulo and Goiás. The state has the fourth lowest illiteracy rate in Brazil, about 4% of its population. The illiteracy rate in the state is compared to countries like Singapore, Portugal, and China.

==== Colleges and universities ====
Most of the state's leading universities are public. The most prestigious university is the Federal University of Rio de Janeiro, regarded as the best Federal university in Brazil, and fifth best in Latin America according to the QS World University Rankings.

Some other well-known colleges, and universities in the state:

==== Public ====
- Federal University of Rio de Janeiro (UFRJ)
- Rio de Janeiro State University (UERJ)
- Fluminense Federal University (UFF)
- Federal University of the State of Rio de Janeiro (UNIRIO)
- Federal Rural University of Rio de Janeiro (UFRRJ)
- Military Institute of Engineering (IME-RJ)
- State University of Northern Rio de Janeiro (UENF)
- Federal Institute of Rio de Janeiro (IFRJ)
- Fluminense Federal Institute (IFF)
- Centro Universitário Estadual da Zona Oeste (UEZO)

==== Private ====
- Pontifical Catholic University of Rio de Janeiro (PUC-RIO)
- Catholic University of Petrópolis (UCP)
- Estácio De Sá University (UNESA)
- Fundação Getúlio Vargas (FGV)
- Universidade Grande Rio (UNIGRANRIO)
- Universidade Cândido Mendes (UCAM)
- University of Vassouras (USS)
- Universidade Castelo Branco (UCB)
- Universidade Santa Úrsula (USU)
- Universidade Veiga de Almeida (UVA)
- Universidade Salgado de Oliveira (UNIVERSO)

== Economy ==
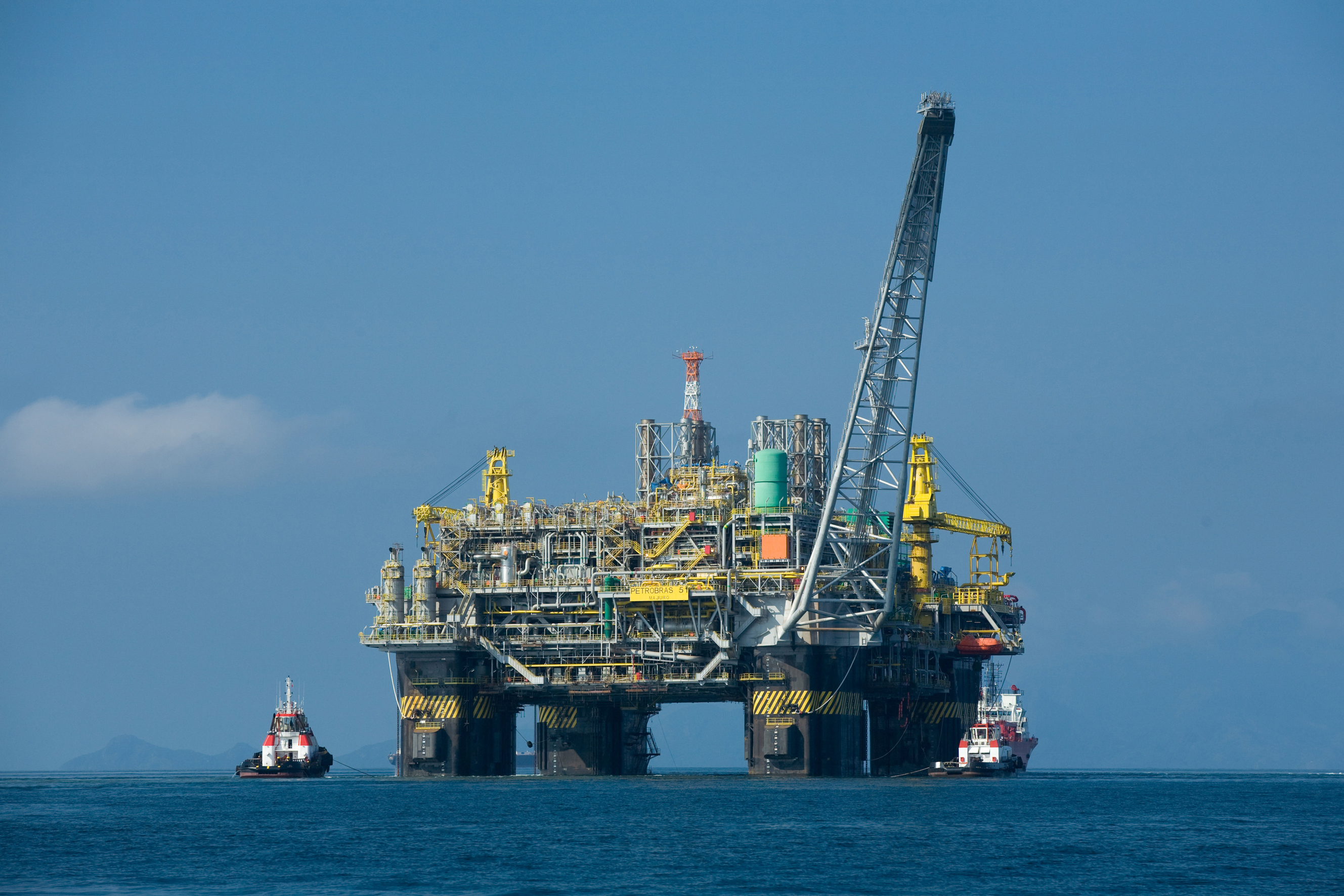
Oil platform P-51 in Rio de Janeiro

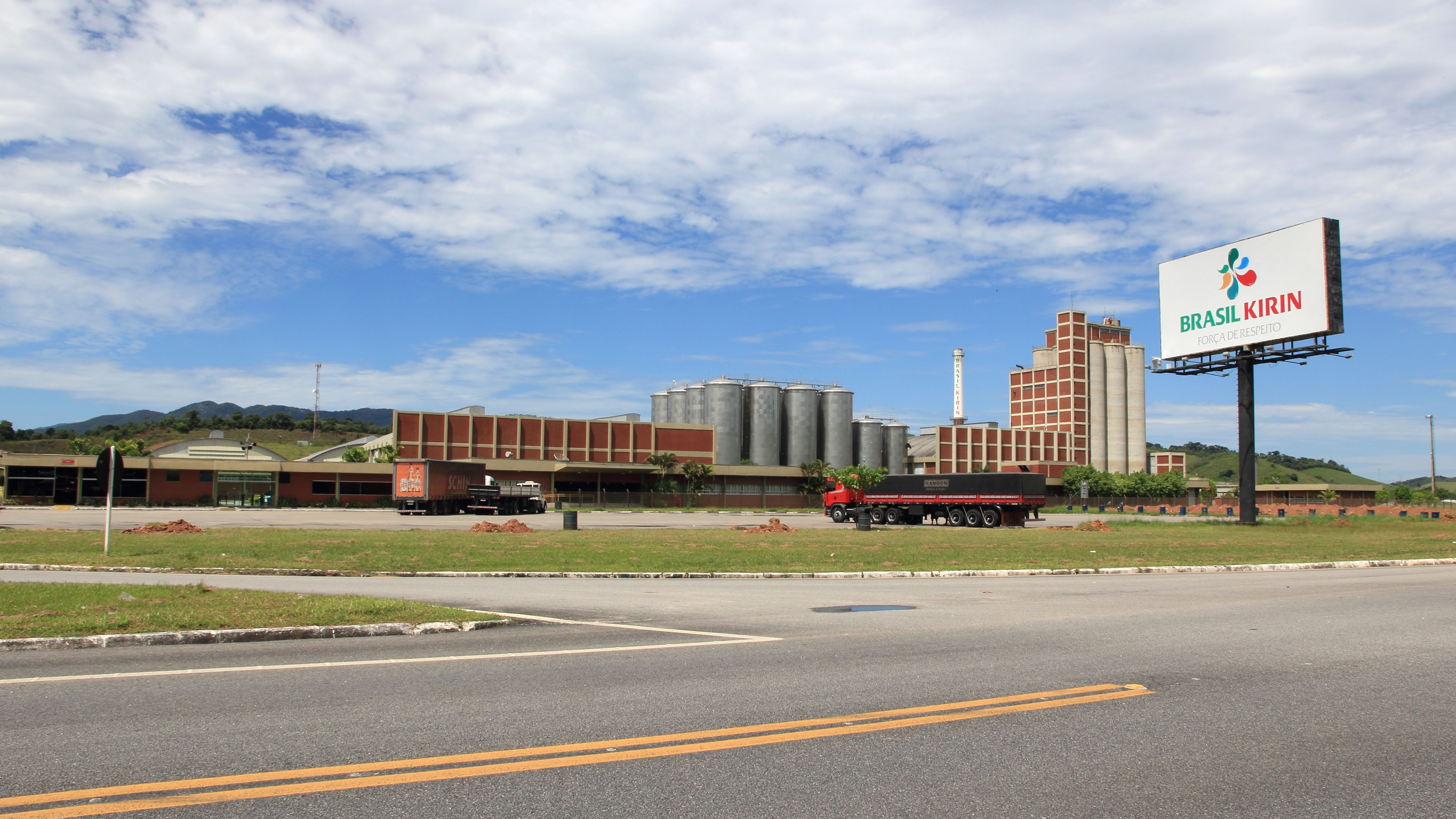
Brasil Kirin's beverage factory in Cachoeiras de Macacu

Much of the economy of the state of Rio de Janeiro is based on the provision of services, with a significant share of industry and little influence on the agricultural sector, which represents only 0.4% of the product gross domestic state.

In the past, sugar cane and later, coffee had a considerable impact on the economy of Rio de Janeiro. The area around Campos dos Goytacazes was most affected by the fall of sugar cane: at the beginning of the 20th century, Campos had 27 mills in operation and, throughout the century, it was one of the largest producers in the world. In Brazil, however, as of 2020, only two sugar mills were operating in the city. The state, which harvested about 10 million tonnes in the 1980s, reached only 1 million tonnes in 2017, when it began to recover, harvesting 1.8 million tonnes in the 2019/ 20. In the agricultural field, the State of Rio currently stands out for some products, such as pineapple, where it is the 4th producer in the country (116 million fruits in 2019), which is produced in the cities of São Francisco de Itabapoana, São João da Barra, Campos dos Goytacazes and Quissamã. It has small productions of cassava (216 thousand tons in 2019, 20th place in the country), banana (76 thousand tons in 2019, 20th place in the country), orange (68 thousand tons in 2019, 10th place in the country), tangerine (37 thousand tons in 2019, 5th place in the country), lemon (20 thousand tons in 2019, 5th place in the country) and persimmon, where it has 6% of national production, being 4th place in the country. The state was also an important producer of coconuts, in the regions of Quissamã and the Lakes Region, and in 2009 it was the 7th national producer, but between 2010 and 2020 several producers abandoned the activity.

The industrial sector is the largest component of GDP at 51.6%, followed by the service sector at 47.8%. Agriculture represents 0.6% of GDP (2004). Rio de Janeiro (state) exports: petroleum 44.8%, fuel 17.5%, siderurgy 13%, chemicals 3.6%, nonferrous metals 2.8%, vehicles 2.1% (2002).

Participation in the Brazilian economy: 15.6% (2004).

There are 3,915,724 vehicles in the state (as of Jan. 2006), 10 million mobile phones, 5.3 million telephones, and 92 cities.

== Tourism ==
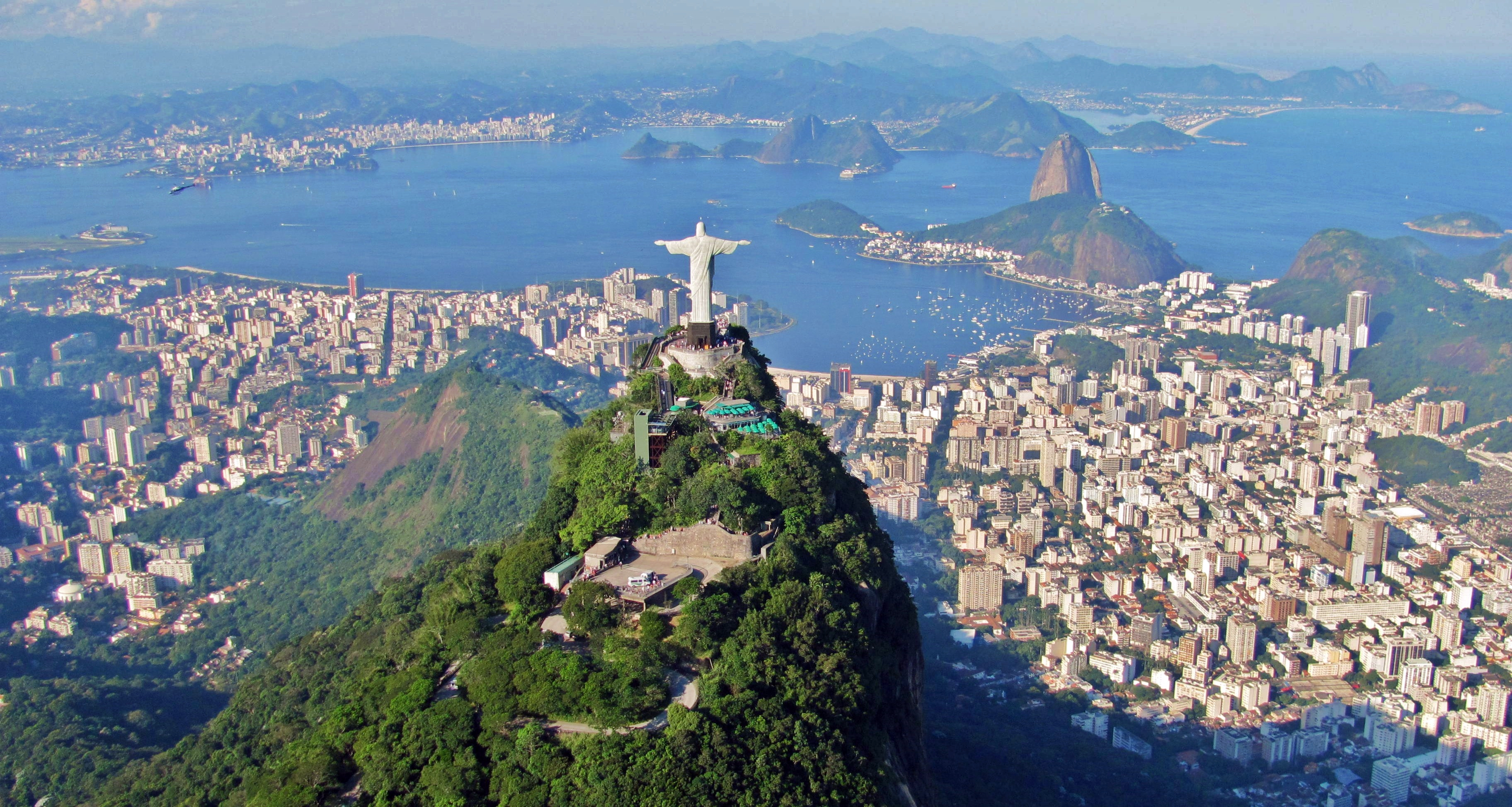
Rio de Janeiro

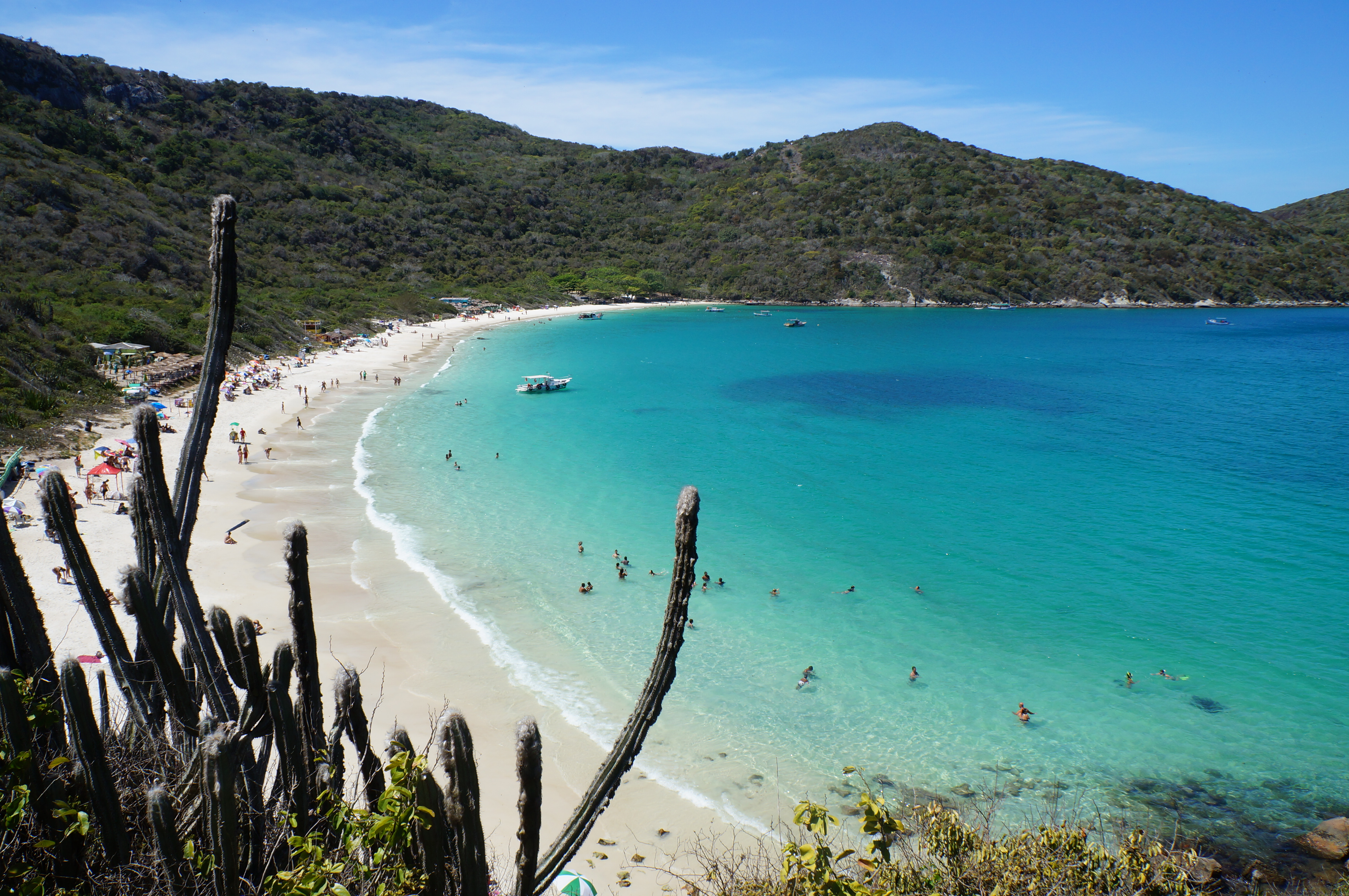
Arraial do Cabo

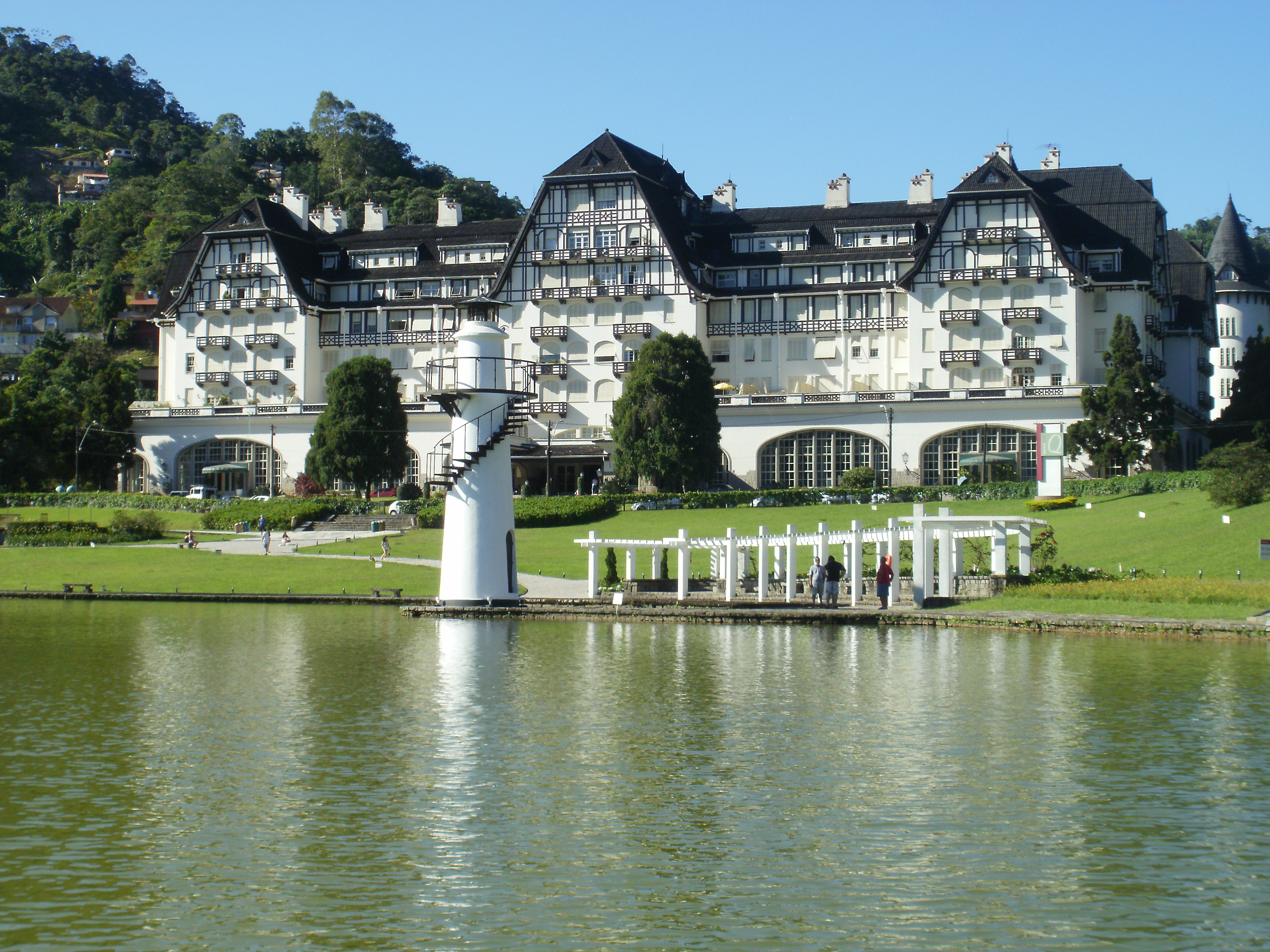
Quitandinha in Petrópolis

Rio de Janeiro is the city that receives the most foreign tourists in all of Latin America. In Brazil, it receives almost 40% of foreign tourists who visit the country and receives the most tourists in all of Brazil. It was named one of the ten most beautiful cities in the world by global travel guide website Ucityguides. It is the city that receives the most tourists from cruise ships. During the summer, the city receives more than three million tourists, being the best-known Brazilian city abroad. The capital of Rio de Janeiro is internationally known for the beauty of its beaches and hills, in addition to having several sites. According to Embratur, it is the most sought-after destination by foreign tourists who visit Brazil for leisure, and second place in business and events tourism.

Christ the Redeemer, elected one of the seven wonders of the modern world, Sugarloaf (with its famous cable car), Rodrigo de Freitas Lagoon, Copacabana, Ipanema and Barra da Tijuca beaches, Tijuca forest, Quinta da Boa Vista, Rio de Janeiro Botanical Garden, Cinelândia and the Maracanã stadium are among the main visiting points. Among the biggest events in the carioca calendar is the Carnival, which, according to the Guinness Book, is the biggest party on the planet with five million revelers playing in the streets of the city, and the New Year's party in Copacabana, which is also Listed in Guinness Book as the largest New Year's party in the world, with more than 4 million people spread across the city's beaches, including 2 million on Copacabana Beach alone.

Of the 10 most visited cities in the country by leisure tourists, 4 are in the state of Rio. In addition to the capital, in the lake region, Armação dos Búzios, and in the south of the state, Angra dos Reis, both focused on high-end tourism; also in the south of the state, the town of Paraty, with its colonial architecture and cobbled streets. The beaches of the Lagos region are also very popular, in the towns of Cabo Frio and Arraial do Cabo; and Ilha Grande. The mountainous region is home to the imperial city, Petrópolis, seat of Brazil's ancient empire; its neighbor Teresópolis; Nova Friburgo, colonized by the Germans; Penedo, colonized by the Finns, and the village of Visconde de Mauá, in the municipality of Resende, as winter refuges to enjoy the cold.

== Infrastructure ==
=== Highways ===
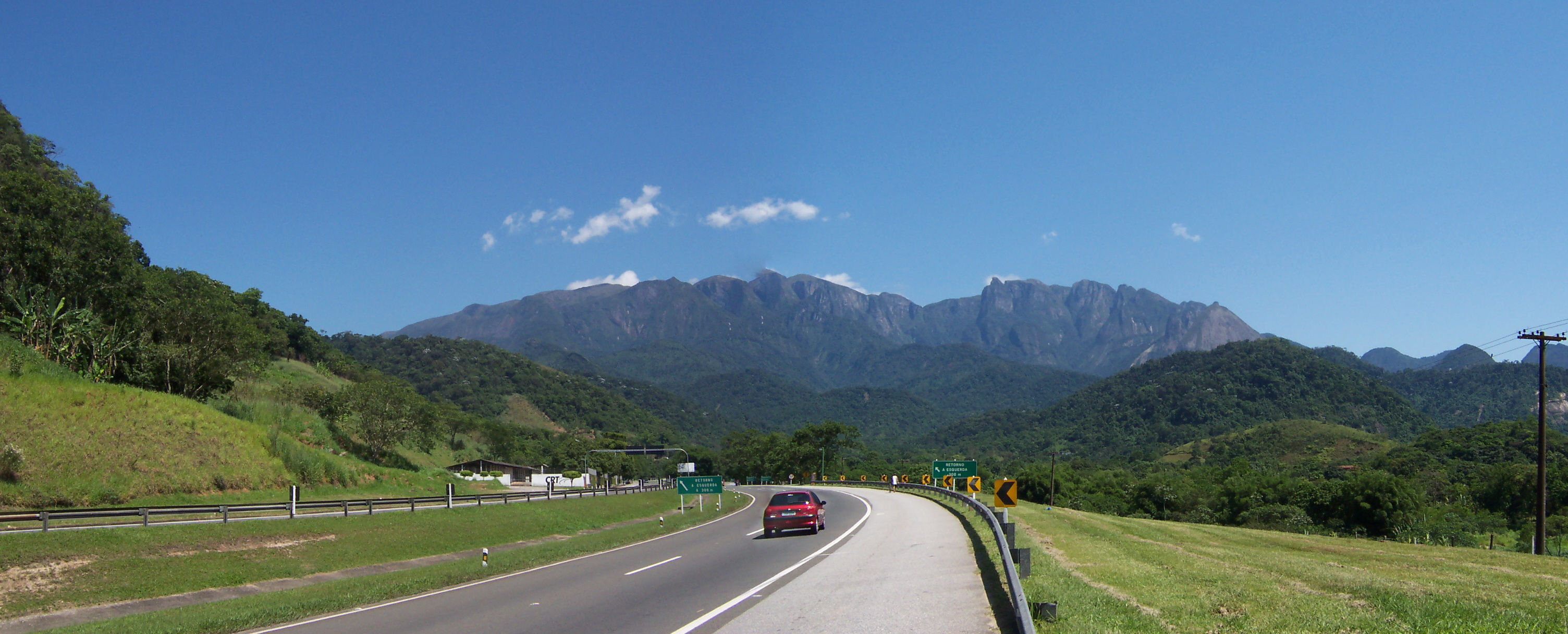
BR-116 highway in the mountainous region of Rio de Janeiro

The state of Rio de Janeiro is one of the best in the country in terms of infrastructure, although it has some shortcomings, mainly due to its mountainous terrain. In the highway sector, there are about 800 km of highways, the main highway being BR-101, then BR-116. The Presidente Dutra highway, the name given to the BR-116 on the section that connects the country's two main cities (São Paulo to Rio), passing through Volta Redonda, Barra Mansa and Resende, was the first duplicate highway in the country, in 1967. The section of the BR-101 is the one that connects the capital to the border with Espírito Santo, passing through important towns such as Niterói, bordering Cabo Frio and Búzios, then Macaé and finally Campos dos Goytacazes. The section between Rio Bonito and Campos, bidding to have its 176 km duplicated, already has 126 km doubled. BR-116 passes through the state's mountainous interior and connects Rio de Janeiro to the northeastern region of Brazil. The BR-040 connects Rio to Minas Gerais and its capital Belo Horizonte. Also of note is the Metropolitan Arc, which surrounds the capital with the aim of removing unnecessary traffic from this area, and which is in the process of being fully completed, with only 23 km of duplication of an old existing section missing. Recently, the Presidente Dutra highway was re-tendered to enable a billion-dollar upgrade project for the Serra das Araras road, the oldest section of the highway, built in the 1920s. Generally, the state's highways have a large movement of freight and passenger vehicles.

The main Federal highways that cross the state are:

- BR-101
- BR-116
- BR-040
- BR-354
- BR-356
- BR-393
- BR-465
- BR-493
- BR-495

=== International airport ===
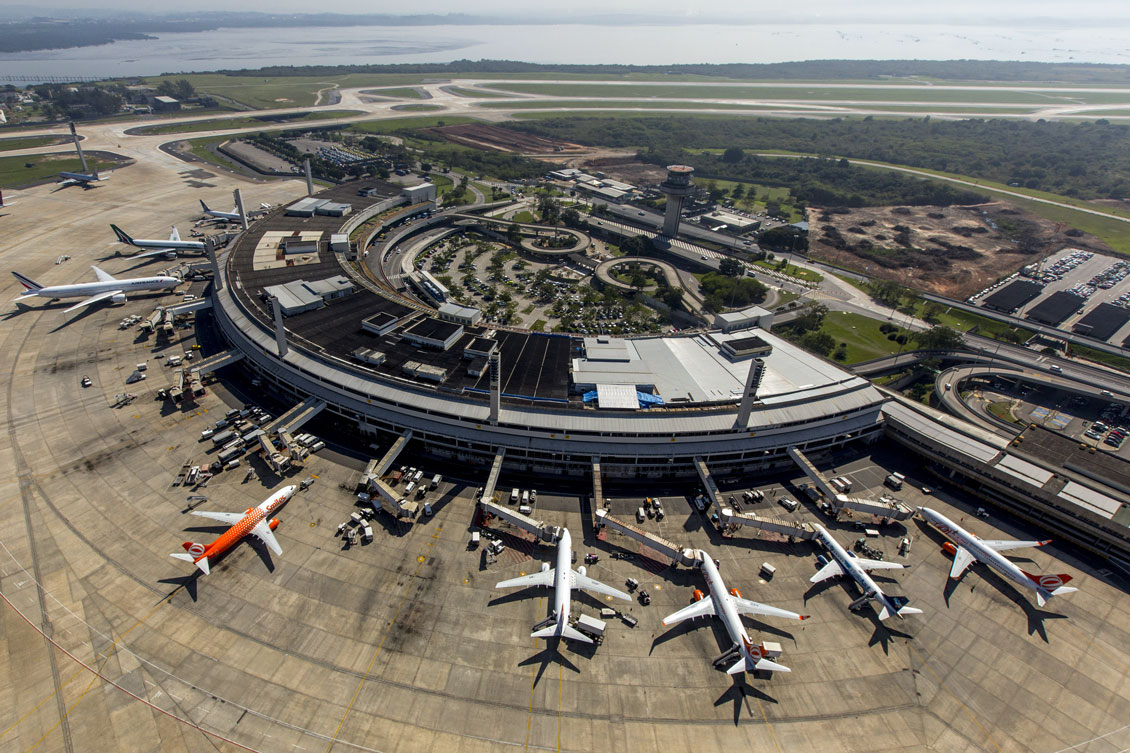
Rio de Janeiro-Galeão International Airport

Since August 2004, with the transfer of many flights from Santos Dumont Airport, to Rio de Janeiro-Galeão International Airport, Rio de Janeiro has second international airport of Brazil. According to data from the official Brazilian travel bureau, Embratur, nearly 40% of foreign tourists who visit Brazil choose Rio as their gateway, meaning Galeão Airport. Besides linking Rio to the rest of Brazil with domestic flights, Galeão has connections to 18 other countries. It can handle up to 15 million passengers a year in two passenger terminals. Located 20 kilometers from downtown Rio, the international airport is served by several quick access routes, such as the Linha Vermelha/Red Line and Linha Amarela/Yellow Line freeways and Avenida Brasil/Brazil Avenue, thus conveniently serving residents of the city's southern, northern and western zones. There are special shuttle buses linking Galeão to Santos Dumont, and bus and taxi service to the rest of the city. The airport complex also has Brazil's longest runway at 4,240 metres (13,910 ft), and one of South America's largest and best equipped cargo logistics terminals.

=== Port ===
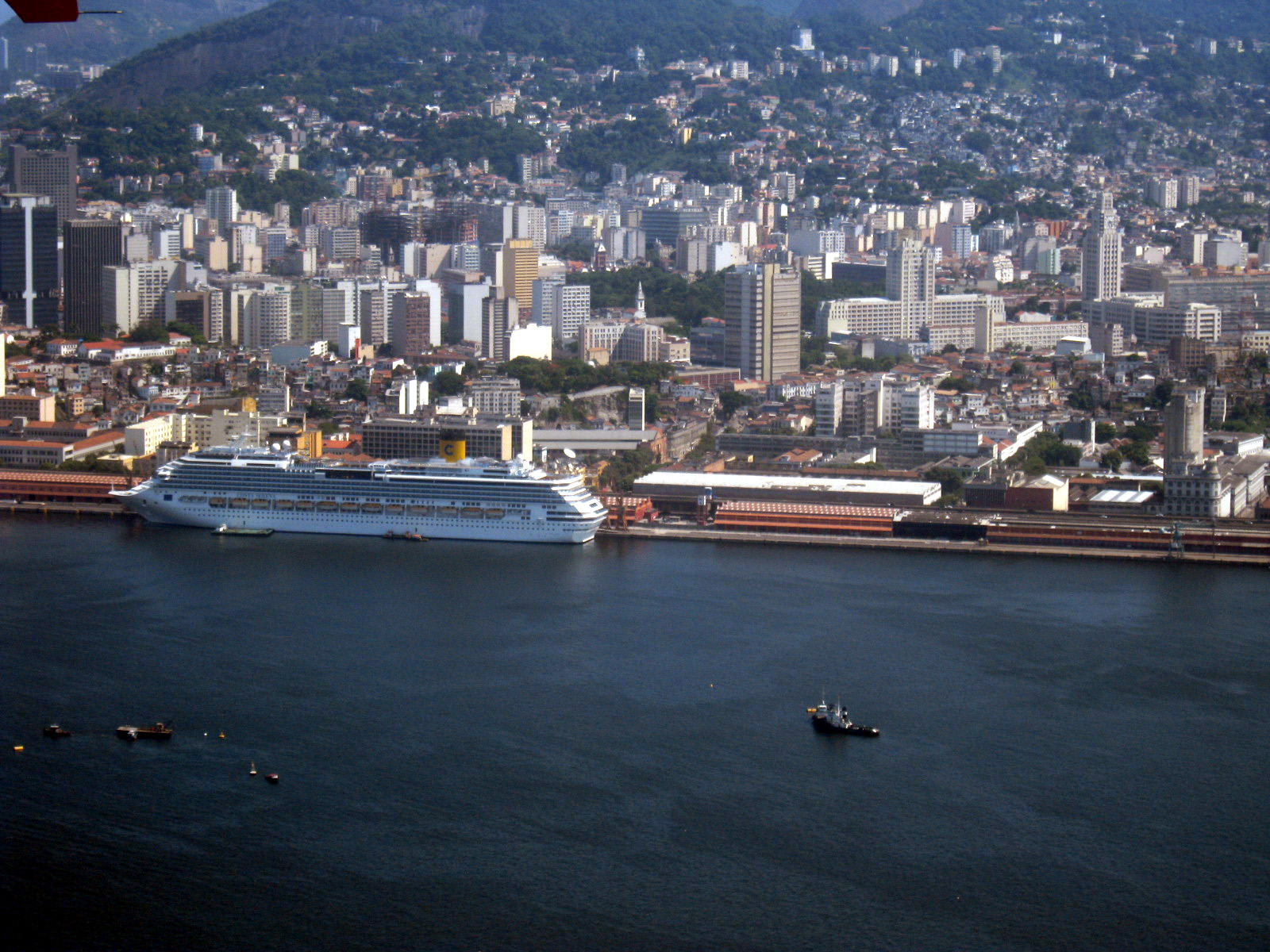
Port of Rio de Janeiro

Rio de Janeiro has several important ports, such as the Port of Rio de Janeiro, the Port of Itaguaí and the Port of Açu, in addition to others such as Niterói and Angra dos Reis. All ports in the state have several rail and road accesses. The Port of Rio de Janeiro is a major exporter of Minas Gerais iron, steel products and vehicles, importing containers, wheat, steel products and zinc concentrate. The Port of Itaguaí exports Minas Gerais iron ore and containerized cargo, importing coal, coal coke, containerized cargo, alumina and steel products. Açu, in 2023, was the third largest private iron ore terminal in Brazil, where it is responsible for 30% of the country's oil exports. In addition, in 2023, it was building the largest thermoelectric park in Latin America, and it houses the largest offshore support base in the world.

== Sports ==
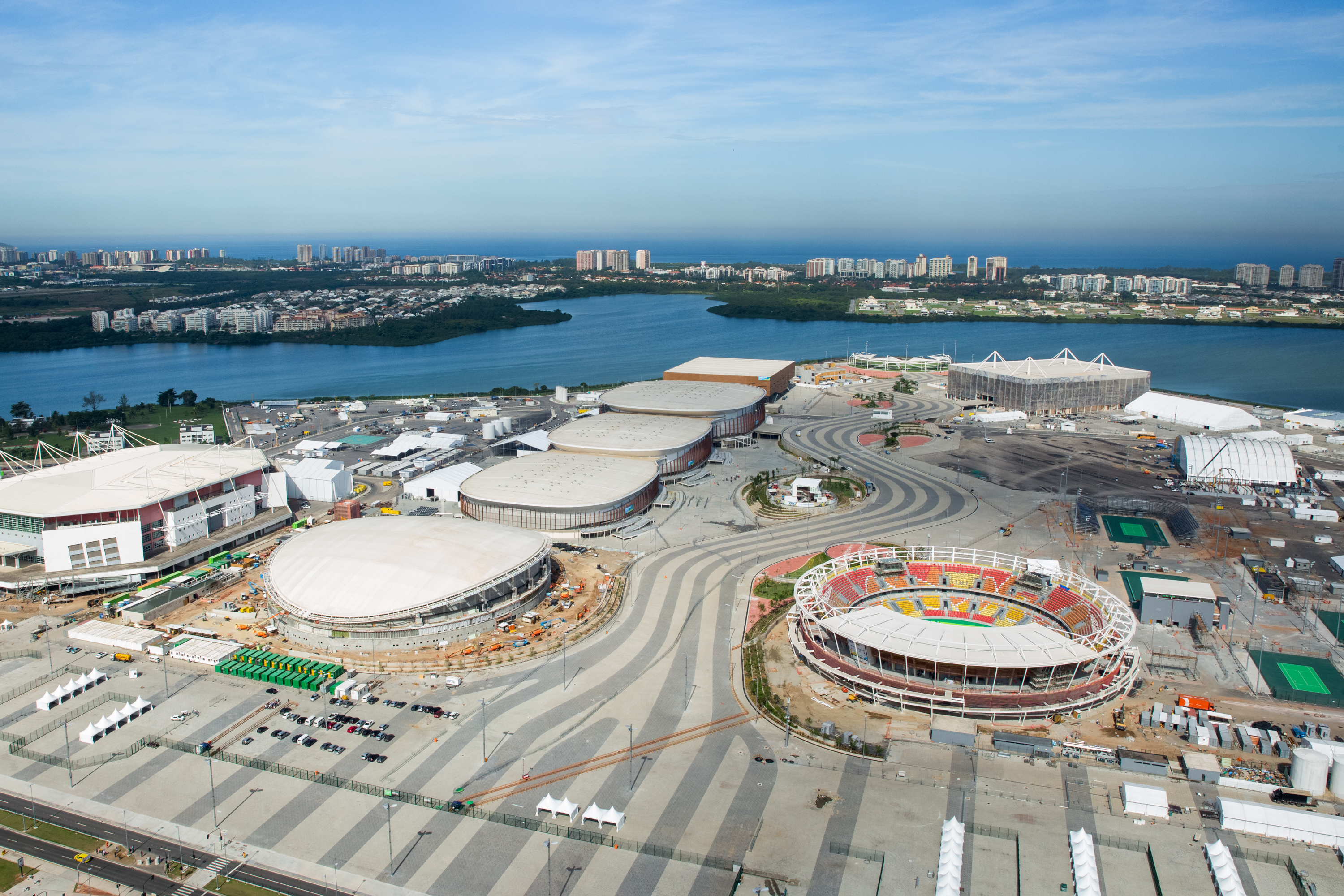
Barra Olympic Park, built for the 2016 Summer Olympics.

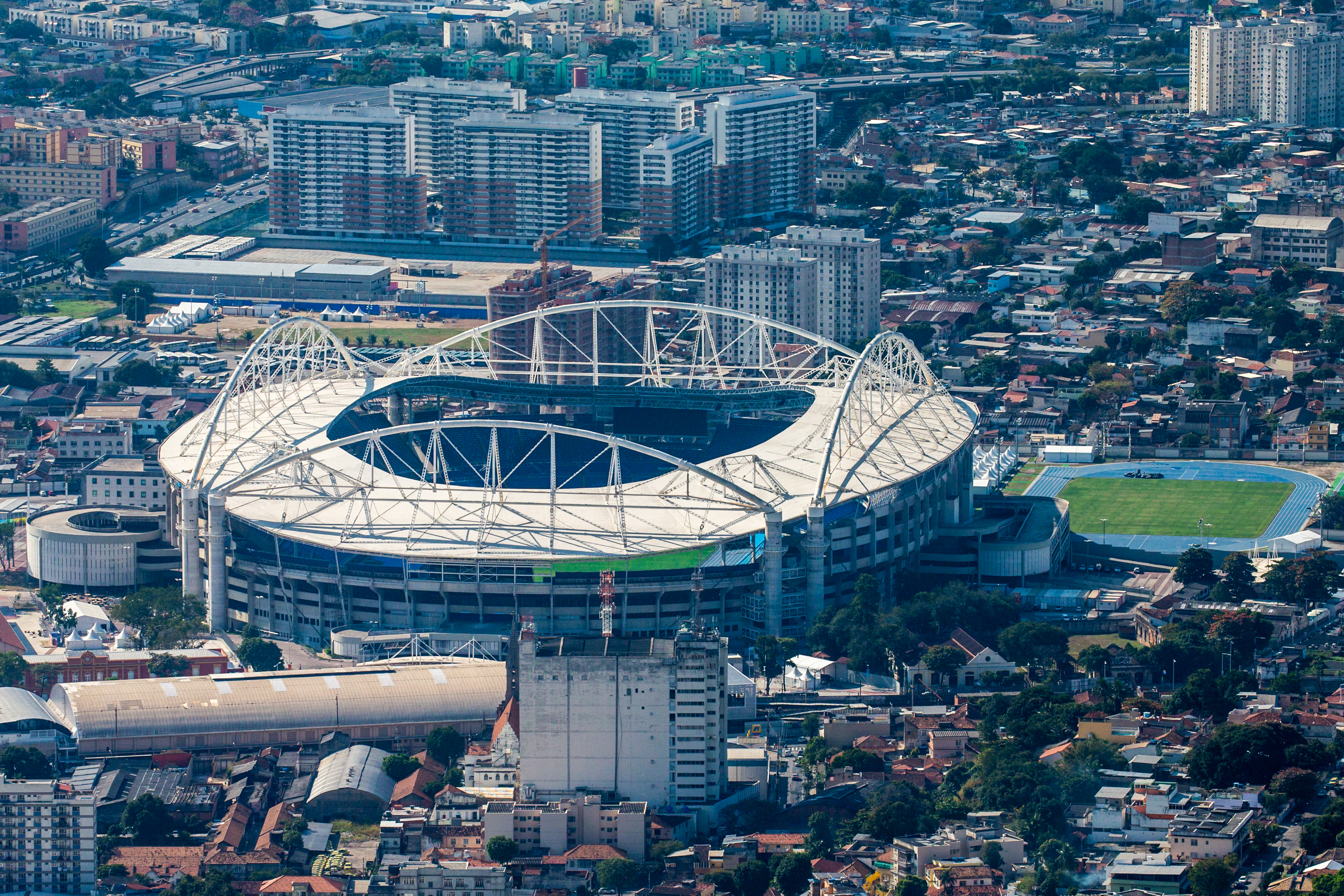
Nilton Santos Olympic Stadium, known as "Engenhão".

The sport that stands out the most in the state is football. The four main football clubs in Rio de Janeiro are Clube de Regatas do Flamengo, Botafogo, Fluminense and Vasco da Gama. The state is also known for producing significant athletes in volleyball, yachting, swimming, basketball, skateboarding, surfing, beach volleyball, rowing, jiu-jitsu and MMA. The state hosted the 1950 and 2014 FIFA World Cup finals, as well as the 2016 Summer Olympics. It also hosted the 2007 Pan American Games, the 1995 FINA World Swimming Championships (25 m), the 1954 FIBA World Championship and the 1963 FIBA World Championship, among many others. Horse racing takes place at the Gávea Hippodrome. Jacarepaguá was the venue for the Brazilian leg of the Formula One Grand Prix, between 1978 and 1990, and Champ Car (1996–1999). The WCT and WQS surf tours took place on Rio's beaches between 1985 and 2001. The capital also hosts an ATP 500 tennis tournament.

The capital has three major stadiums: Maracanã, the former largest stadium in the world in terms of capacity; Engenhão, planned to host the athletics and football events of the 2007 Pan American Games, and São Januário, the largest private stadium in Rio.

In the state of Rio, Olympic medalists were born such as: Martine Grael, Clínio de Freitas, Daniel Adler, Eduardo Penido, Isabel Swan, Kiko Pelicano, Marcelo Ferreira, Marcos Soares, Nelson Falcão and Ronaldo Senfft in yachting; Thiago Pereira, Bruno Fratus and Jorge Fernandes in swimming; Robson Caetano and José Telles da Conceição in athletics; Luiz Felipe de Azevedo in horse riding; Afrânio da Costa and Fernando Soledade in shooting; Affonso Évora, Alfredo da Motta, Algodão, Edson Bispo, Fernando Brobró, Fritz, Marcus Vinícius Dias, Ruy de Freitas and Sérgio Macarrão in basketball; Adriana Samuel, Ana Cristina, André Nascimento, Bernard, Bernardinho, Bruninho, Fabiana Alvim, Fernanda Ferreira, Fernandão, Janina, Kátia Lopes, Leandro Vissotto, Marcelo Elgarten, Nalbert, Rui, Tande, Thaísa and Valeskinha in volleyball; Bárbara Seixas, Jackie Silva, Raquel da Silva, Sandra Pires in beach volleyball, in addition to Hugo Calderano, the greatest table tennis player in the history of Brazil; Nelson Piquet, three-time F1 world champion, Bob Burnquist, considered one of the greatest skateboarders of all time and Marcus Vinicius D'Almeida, archery world runner-up.

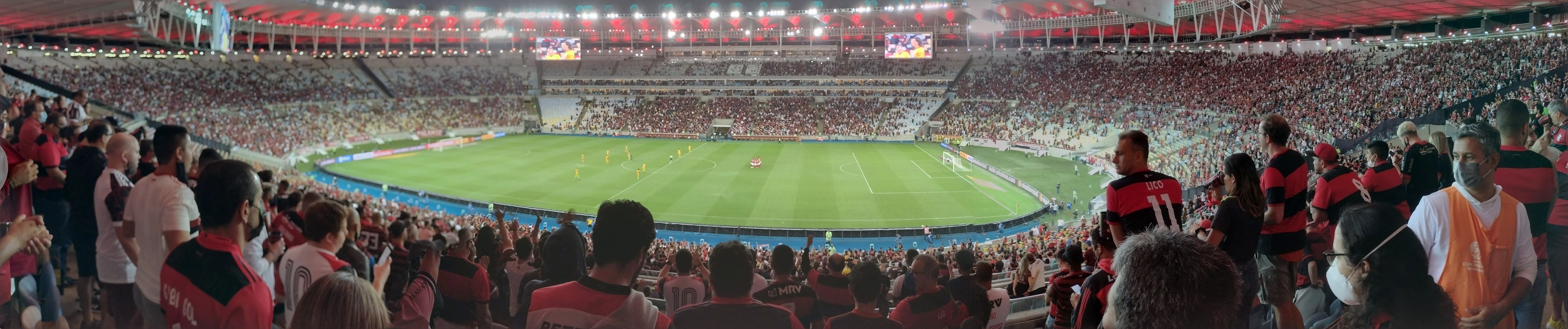
Panoramic view of the interior of the Maracanã Stadium during a match valid for the semi-final of the Copa Libertadores 2021.

== State flag ==
An eagle, symbol of Brazil's royal family, appears on the state flag with the rock formation Dedo de Deus ("The Finger of God") near Teresópolis in the background. The outer part of the coat of arms represents the state's agricultural richness, sugarcane (left) and coffee (right).

Flags used in Rio de Janeiro over the years

Flag of the Captaincy of Rio de Janeiro - Kingdom of Portugal, Brazil and the Algarves (1565 – 1821)

Flag of the Province of Rio de Janeiro (1821 – 1889)

Flag of the State of Rio de Janeiro (1889–present)

== Gallery ==
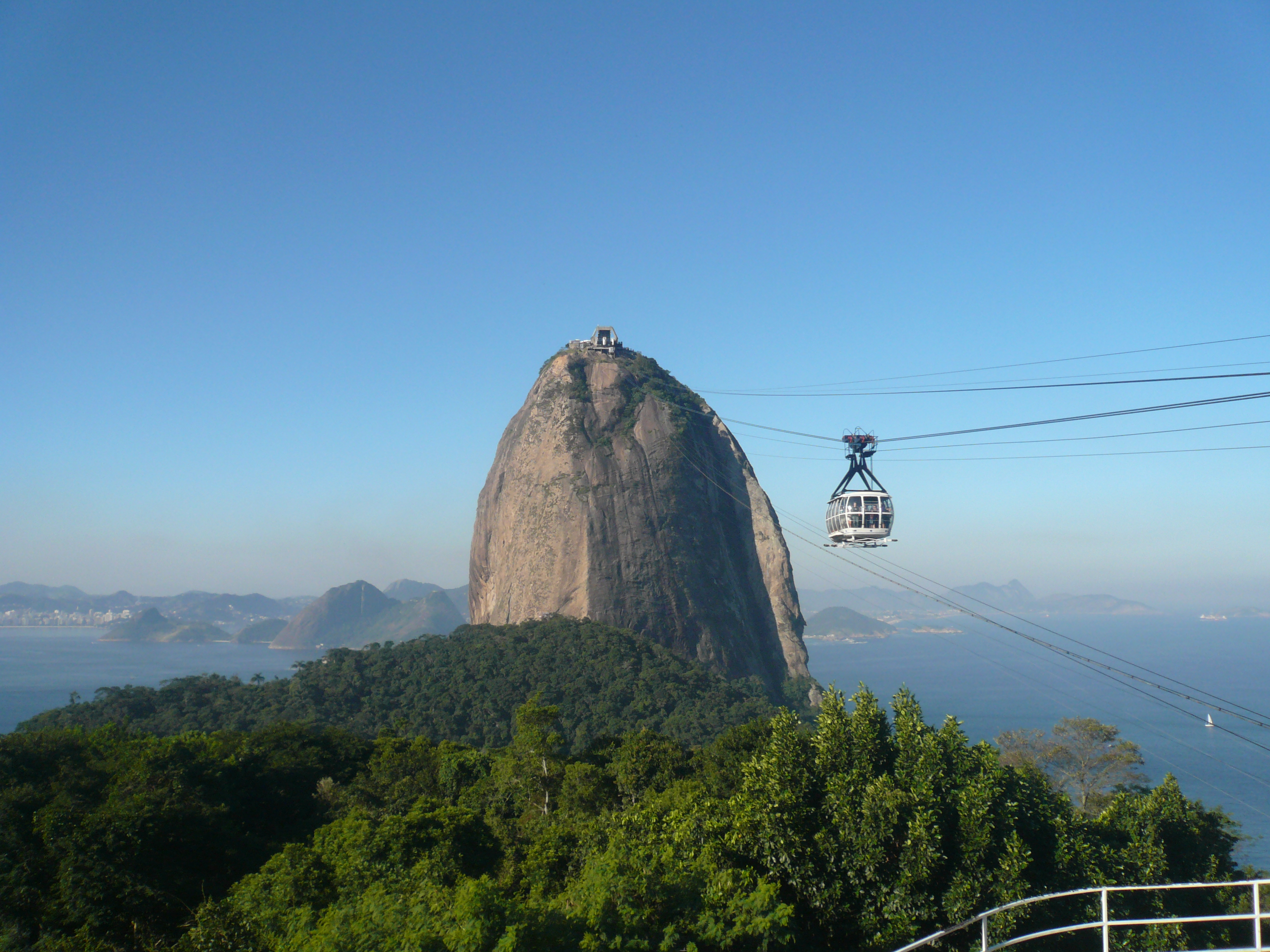
Sugarloaf Mountain

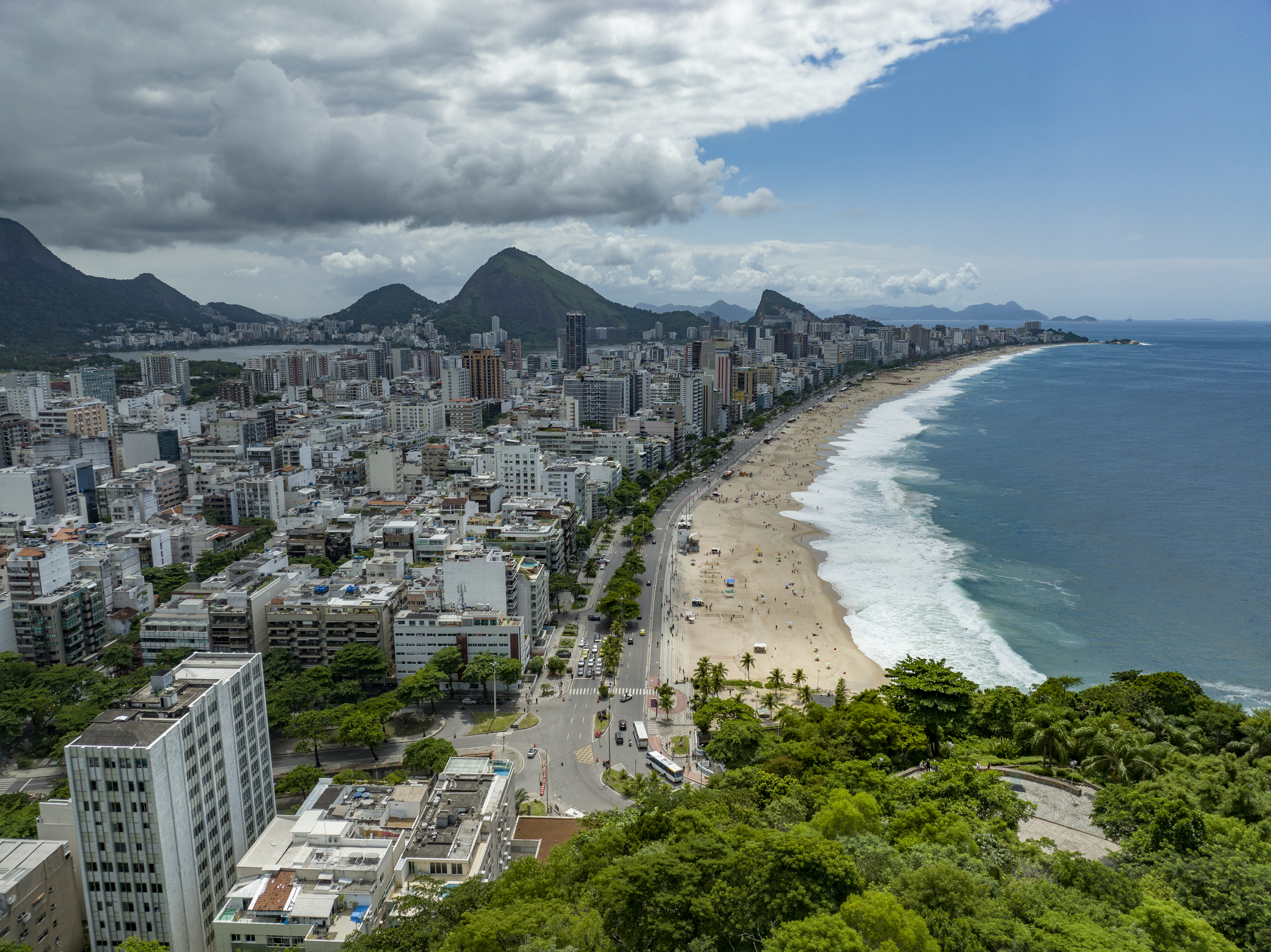
Leblon and Ipanema in Rio de Janeiro

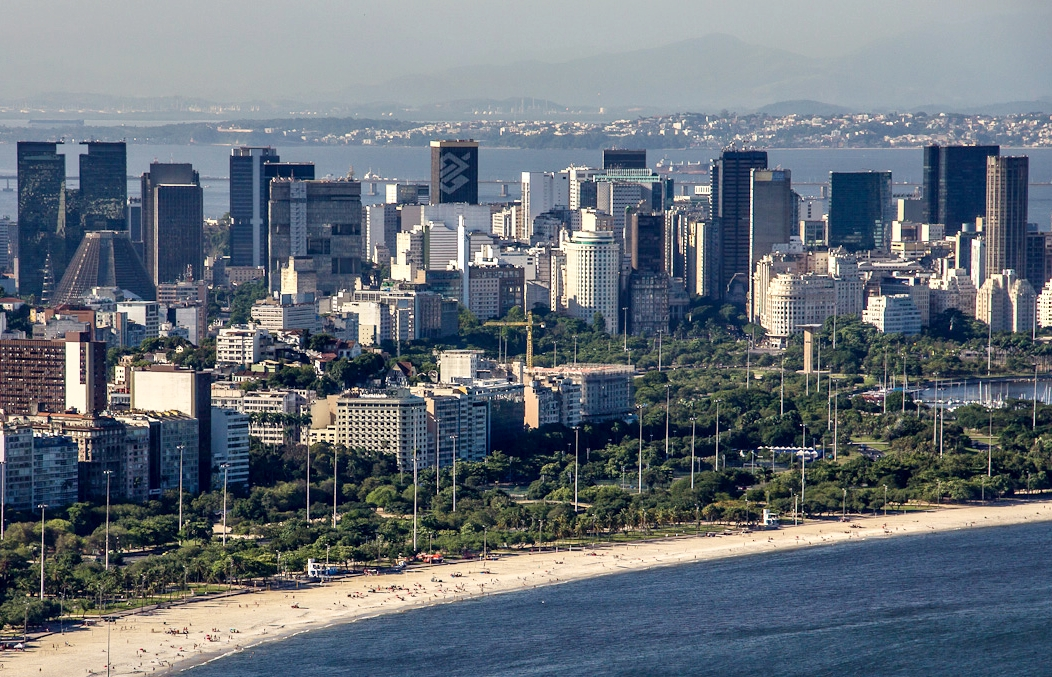
Downtown Rio de Janeiro

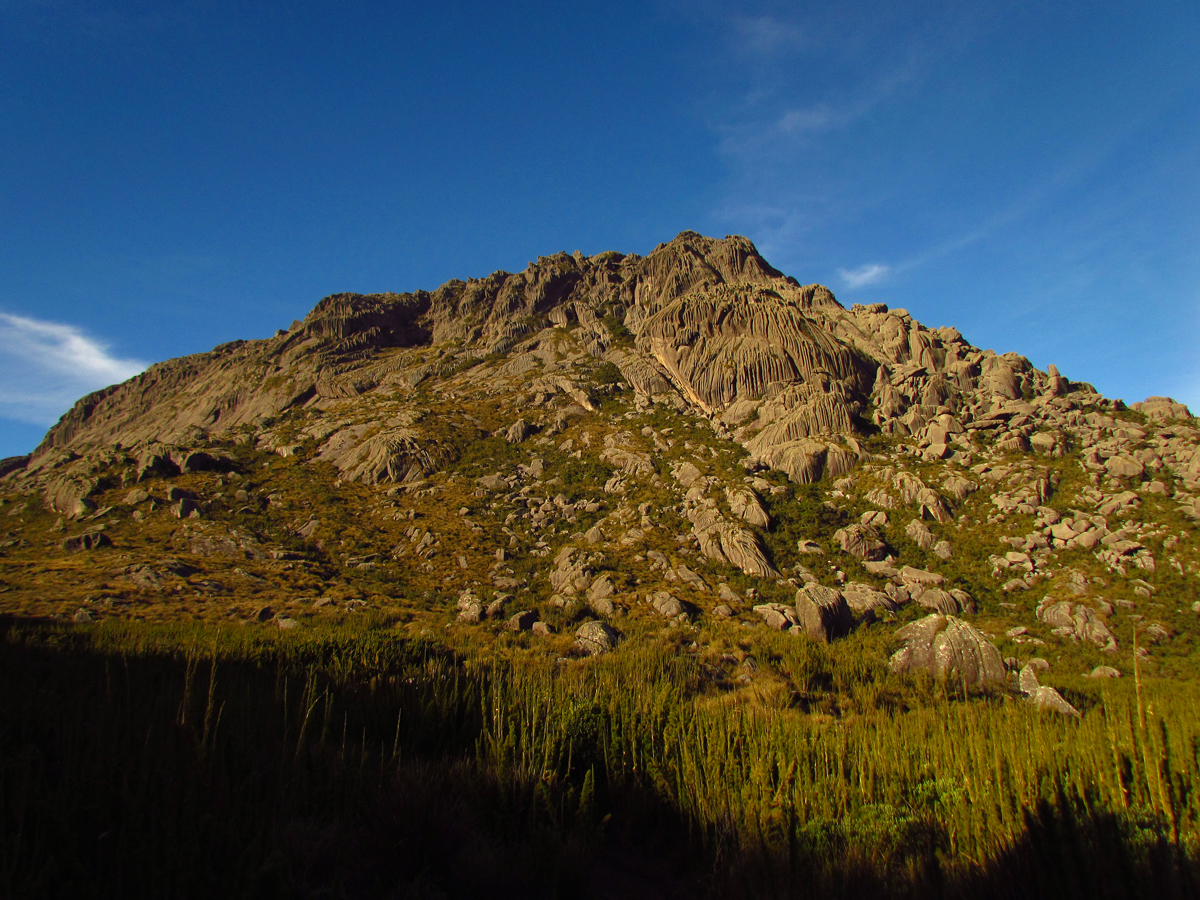
Pico das Agulhas Negras, the highest point in the state of Rio de Janeiro

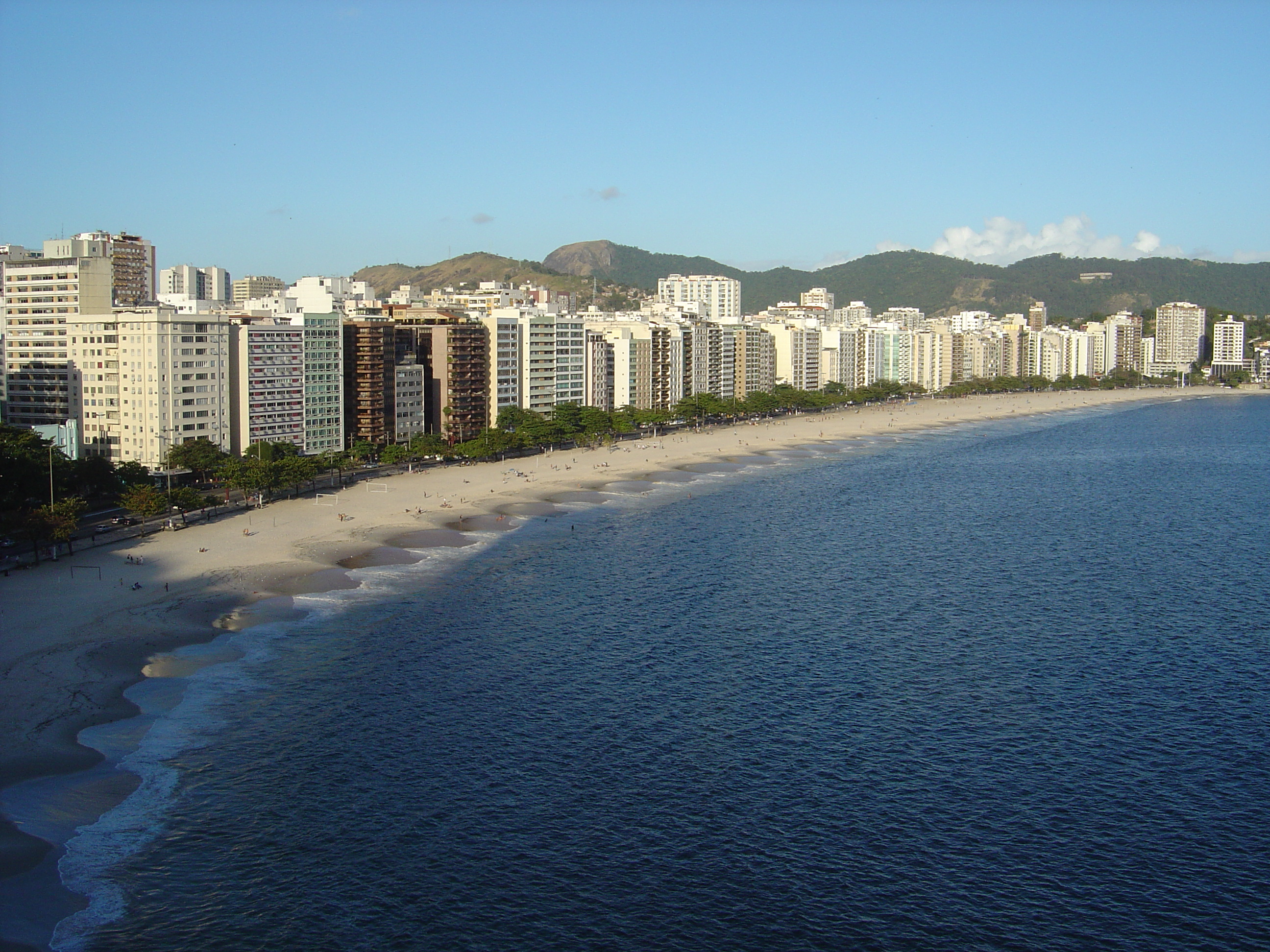
Niterói, one of the most famous and developed cities of the state

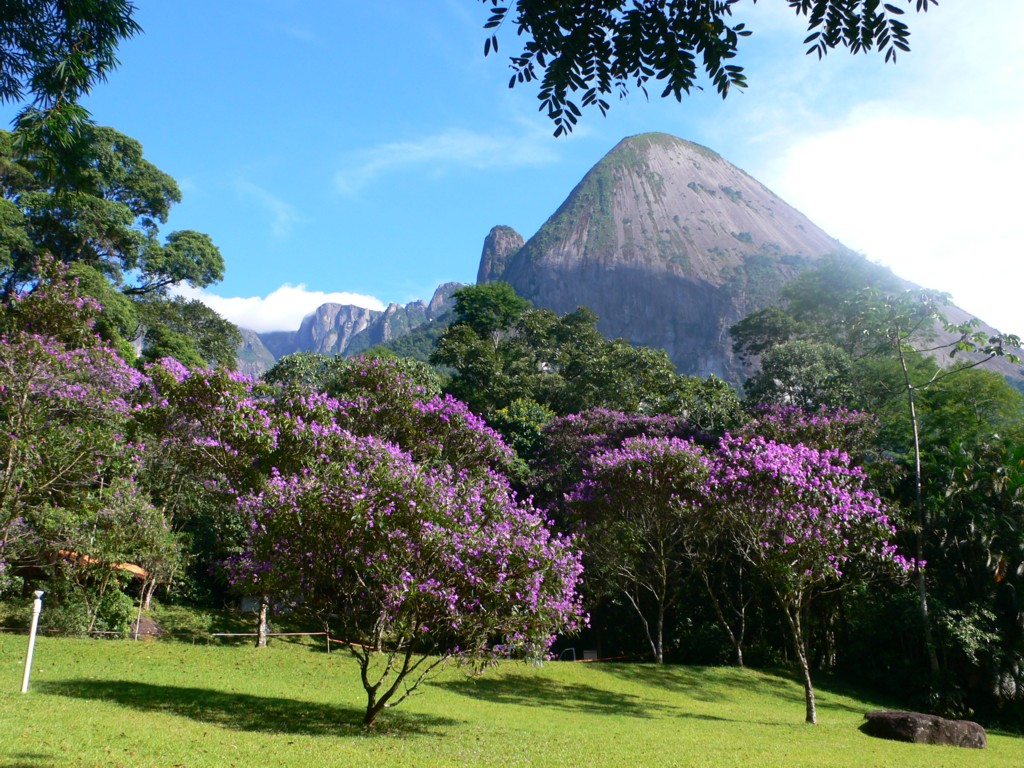
Serra do Mar

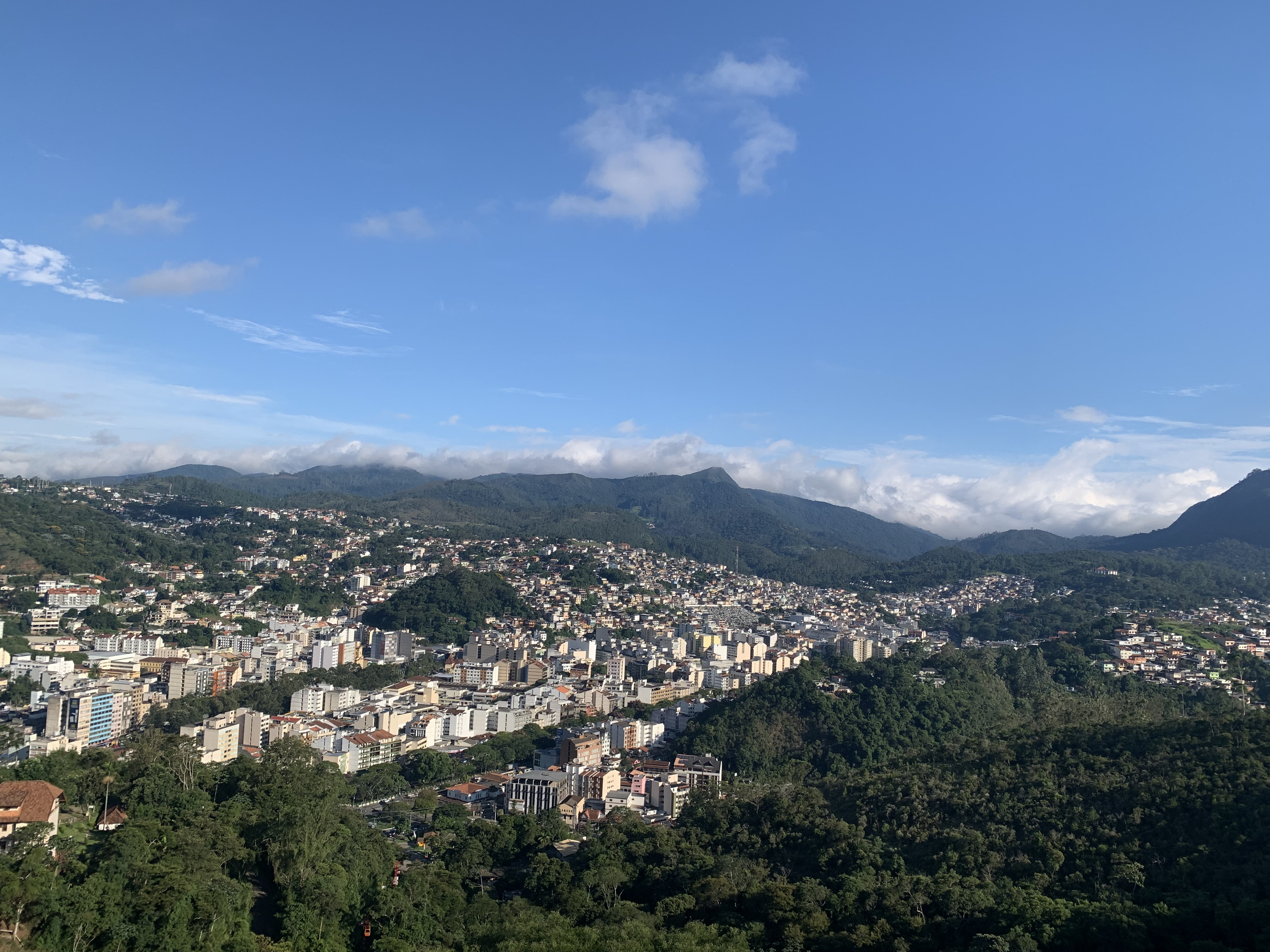
Nova Friburgo, known as "Rio's Switzerland"

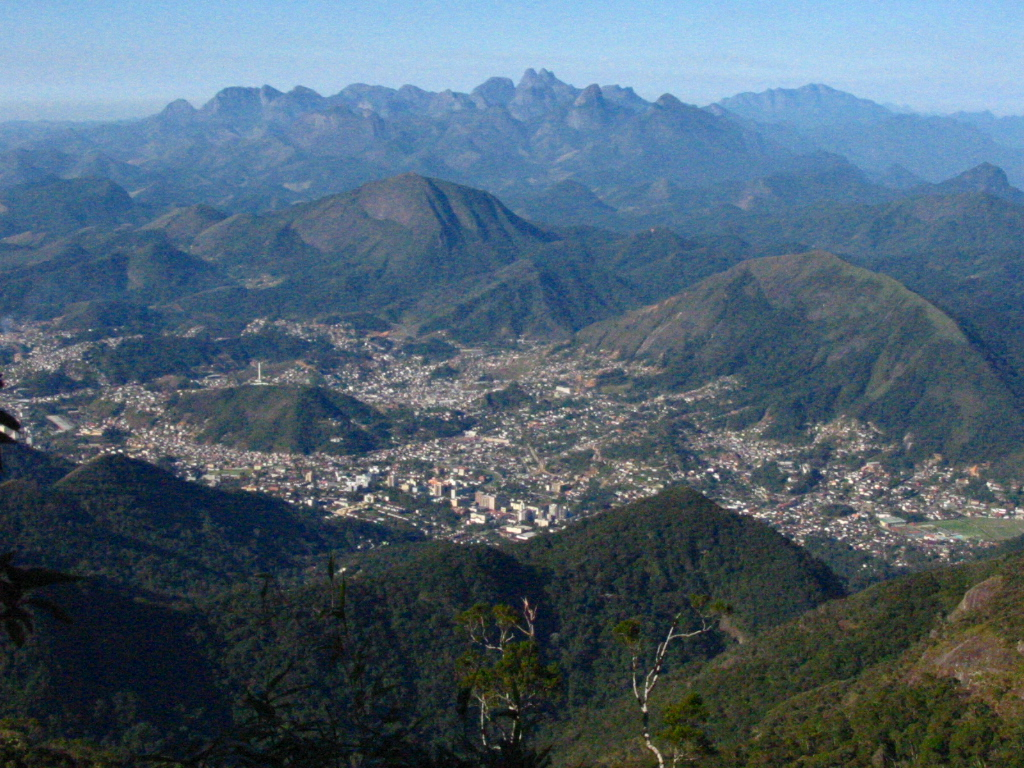
Teresópolis, The highest city in Rio de Janeiro State

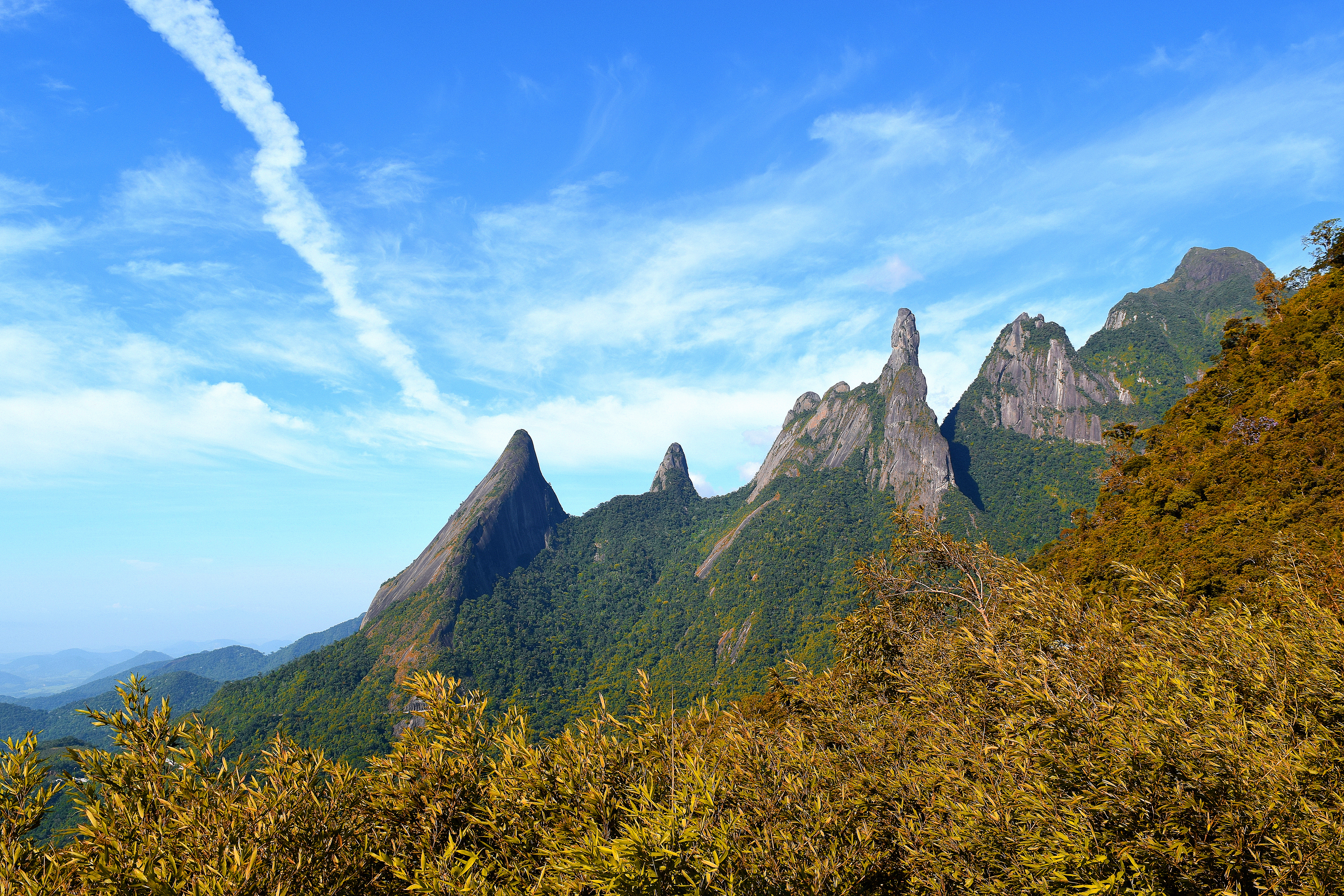
God's Finger peak, a symbol of the state

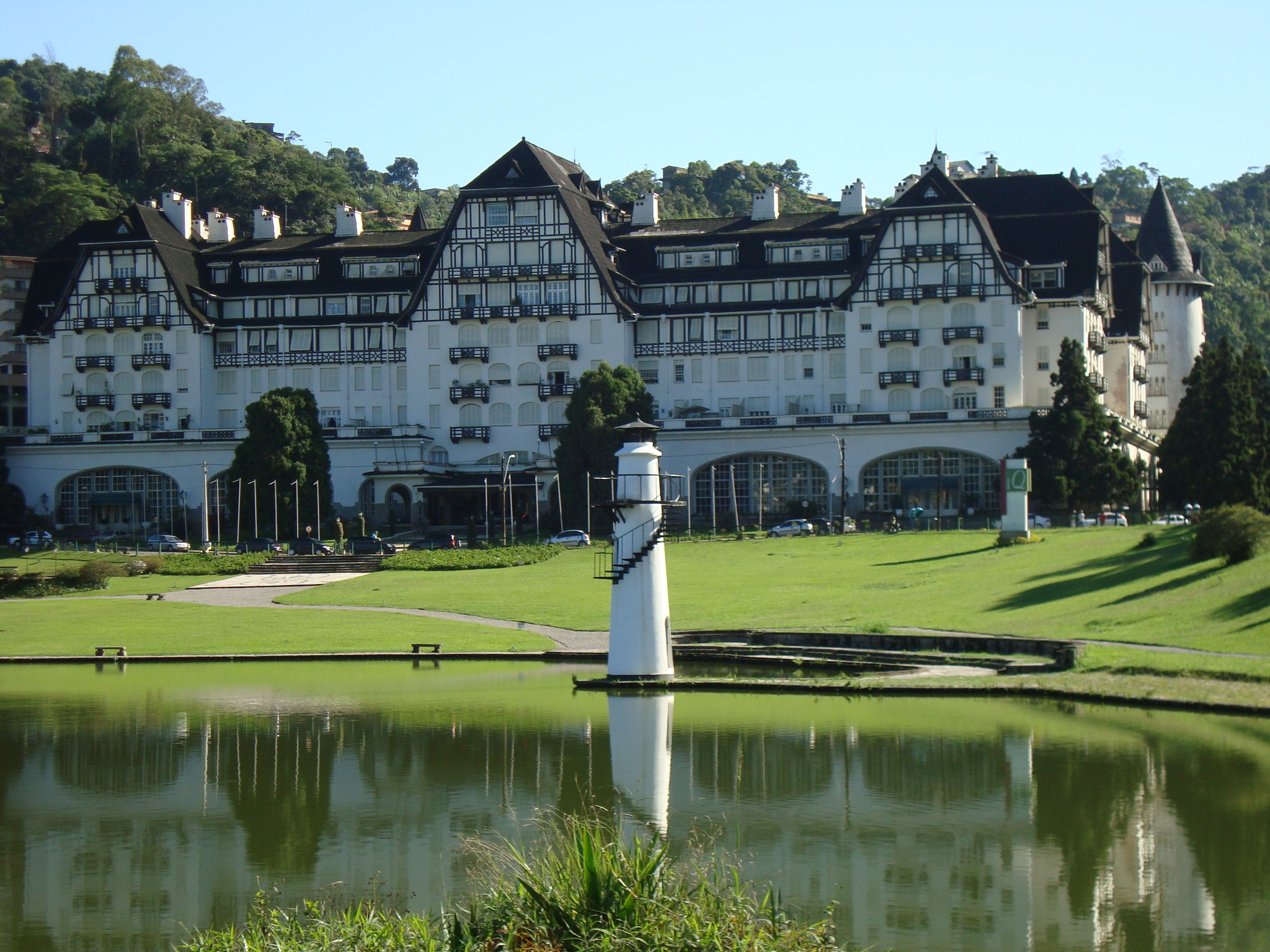
Quitandinha Palace in Petrópolis, The Imperial City

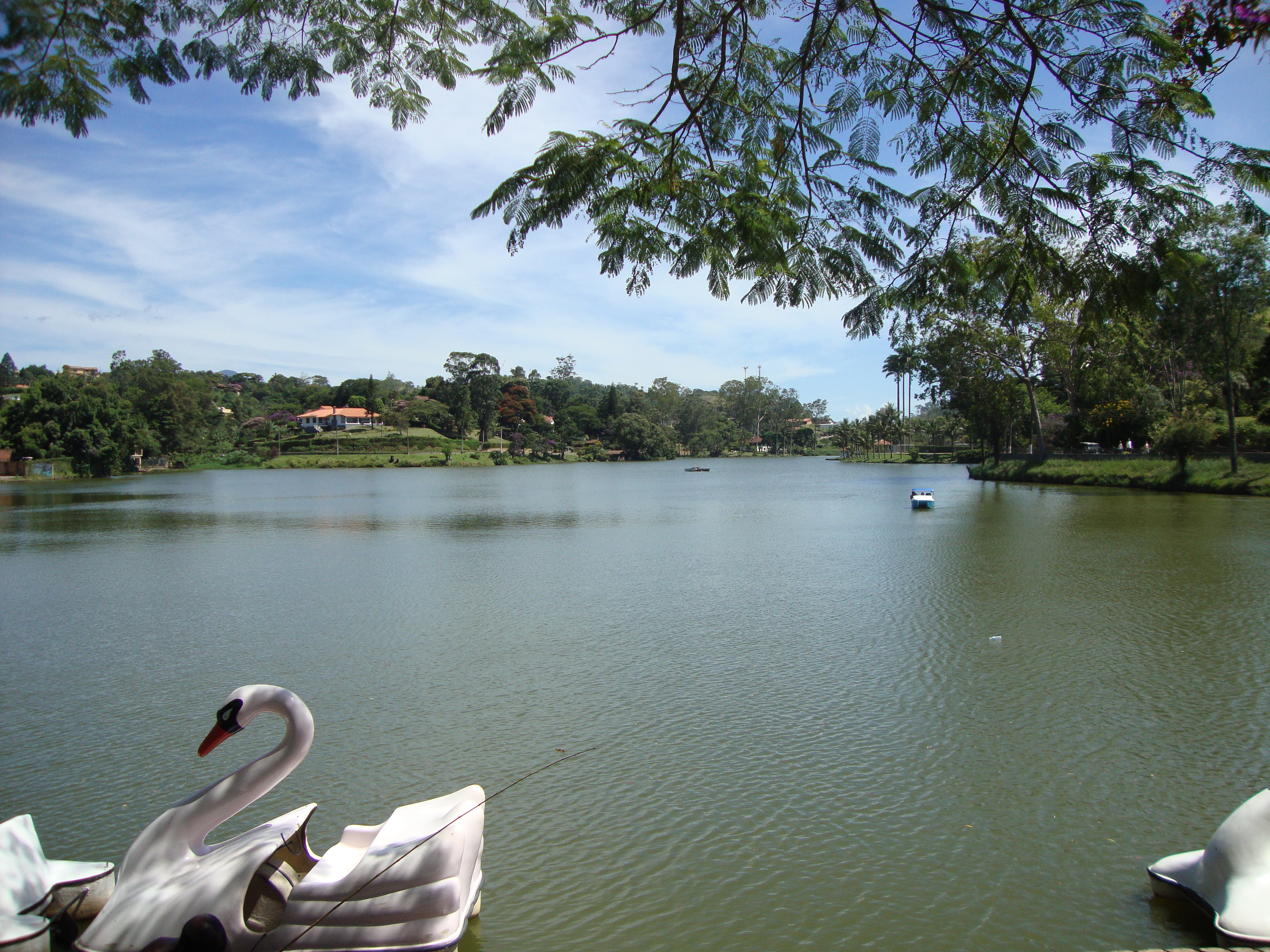
Lago Javary (Lake Javary), Miguel Pereira

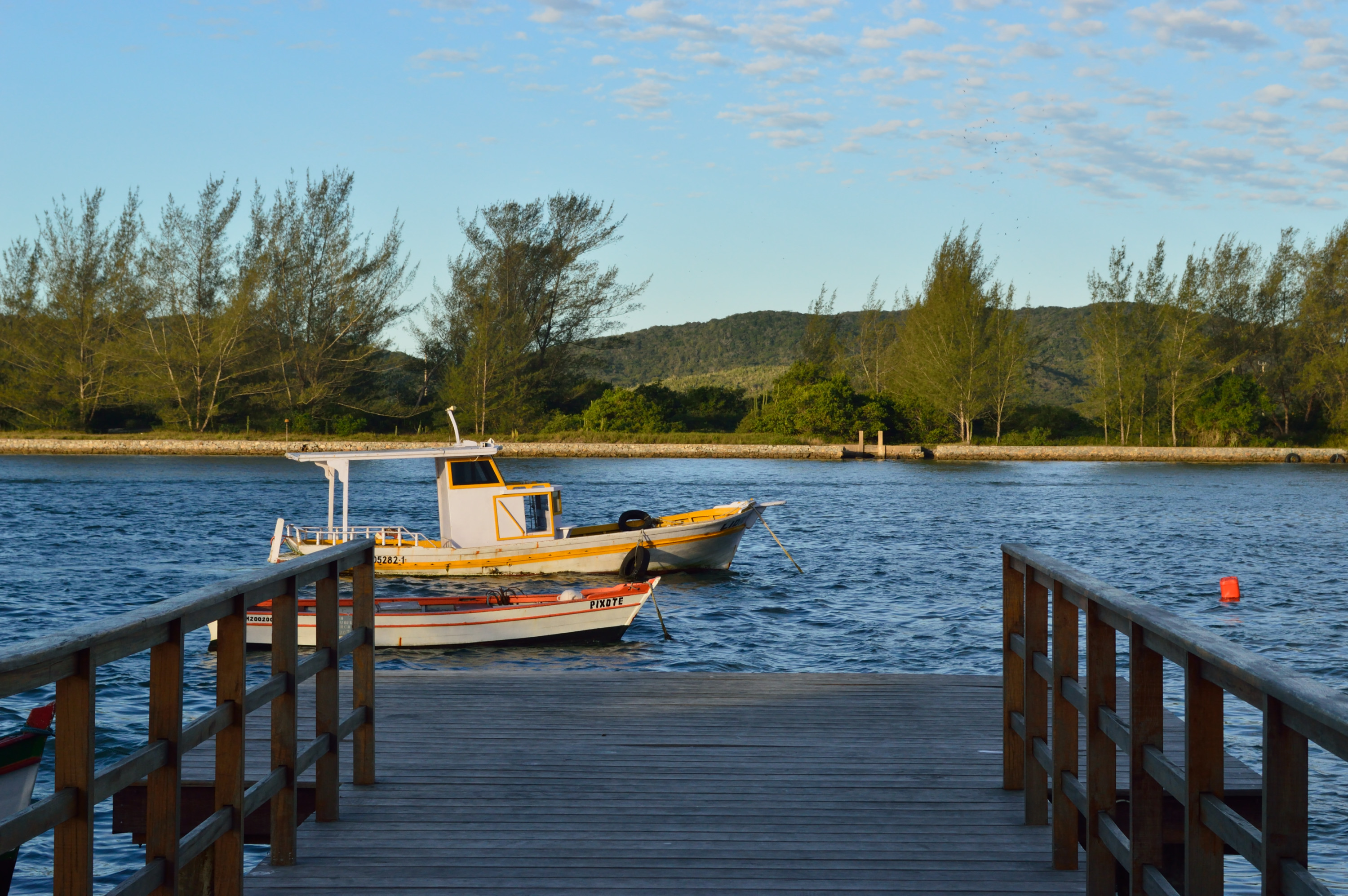
Cabo Frio, The Salinas City, Salt Marsh City

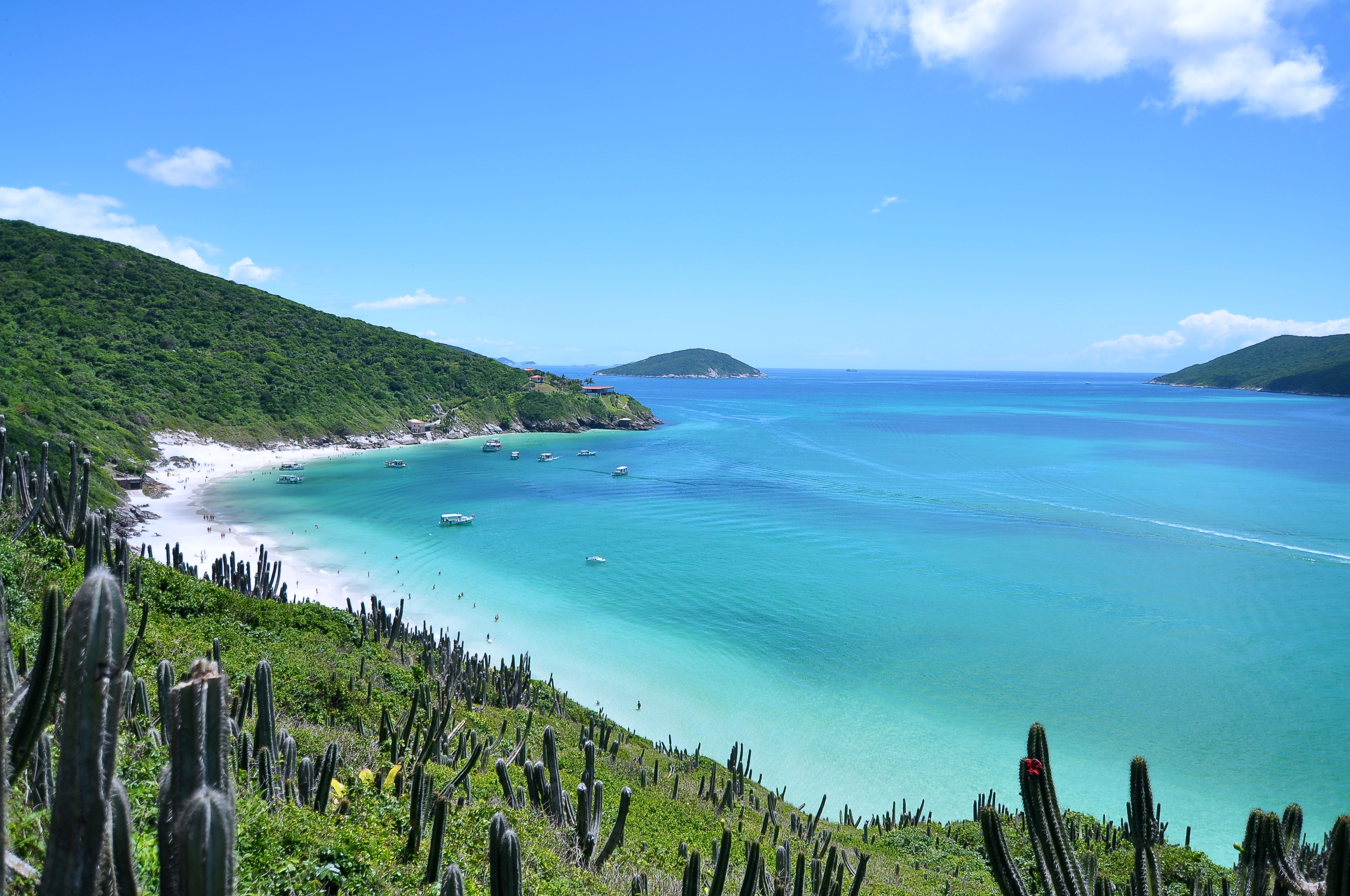
Arraial do Cabo, The fluminense Caribbean

A farm scene in the rural area

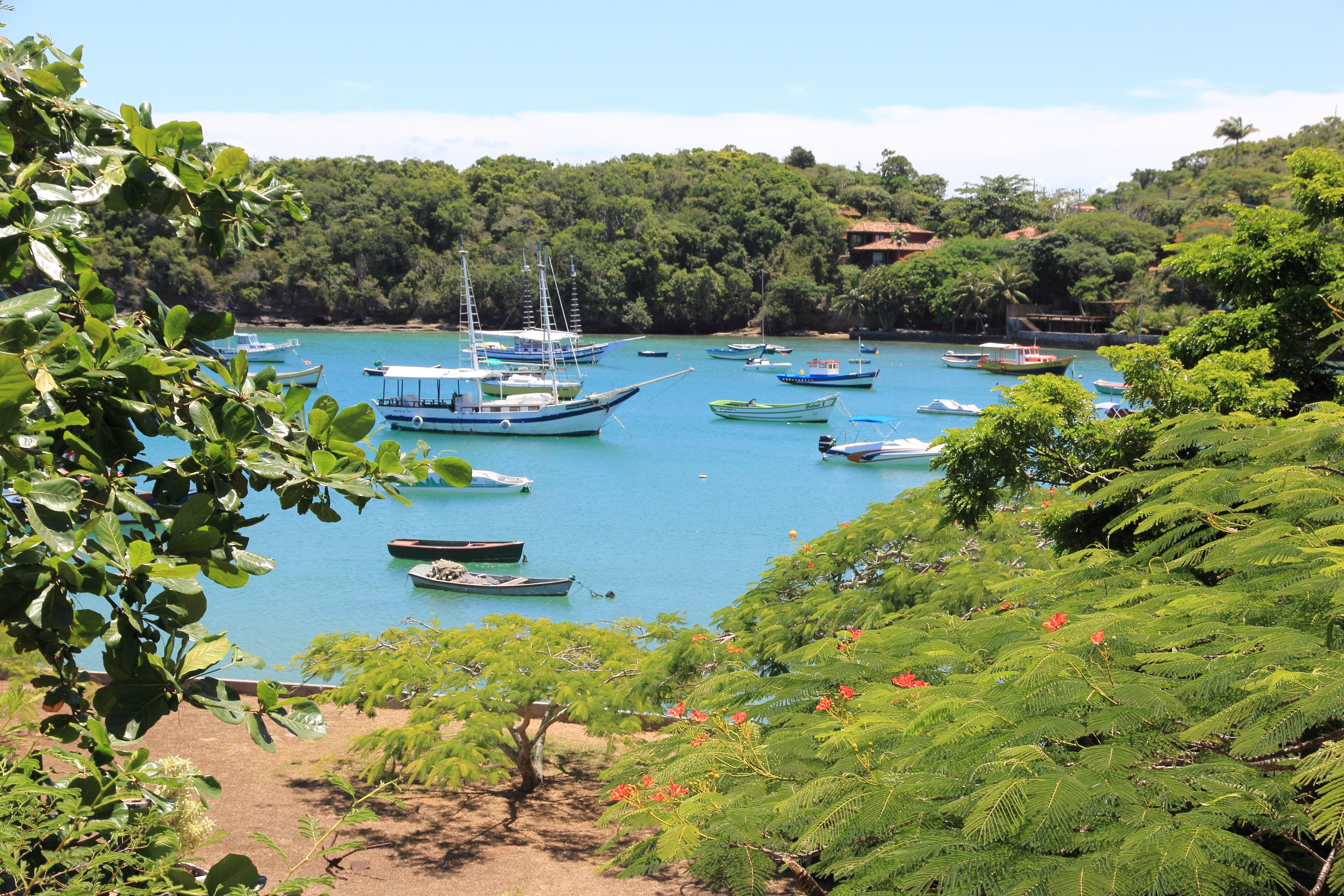
Praia dos Ossos beach in Armação dos Búzios

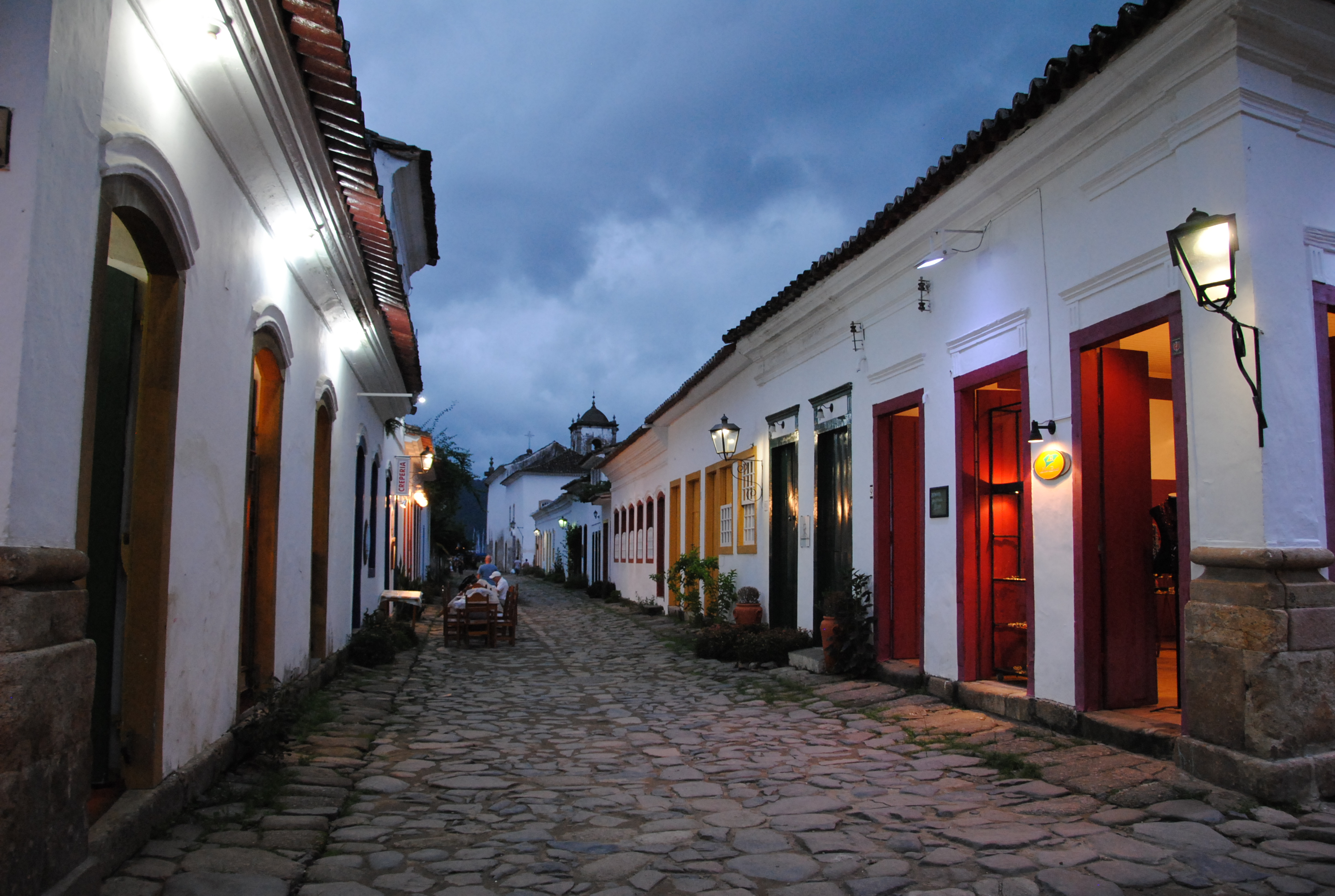
Historic town of Paraty and its Portuguese colonial architecture

== See also ==
- List of governors of Rio de Janeiro
- List of municipalities in Rio de Janeiro
- List of country subdivisions by GDP over 100 billion US dollars
