= Sailing at the Friendship Games =

Sailing at the Friendship Games was contested in seven events. 470 and Finn classes took place at Lake Balaton, Hungary between 20 and 25 August 1984, while Flying Dutchman, Soling, Star, Tornado and Windglider classes were contested at Pirita Yachting Centre in Tallinn, Soviet Union between 19 and 26 August 1984.

== Medal summary ==
Although multiple competitors from one country were allowed to compete, only one team per country could receive a medal. If two or three teams from one country would finish in the top three, only the best one would receive a medal.

Event	Gold		Silver		Bronze	
470	East Germany (GDR); Ullrich Vater; Michael Schrotter	3.0	East Germany (GDR); Jörn Borowski; Egbert Swensson	30.4	Hungary (HUN); György Fundák; Gábor Zalai	32.7
Finn	Oleg Khoperskiy (URS)	3.0	Jacek Sobkowiak (POL)	16.7	Frank Butzmann (GDR)	32.4
Flying Dutchman	Soviet Union (URS); Aleksandr Shpilko; Viktor Budantsev	11.7	Soviet Union (URS); Sergey Borodinov; Vladislav Akimenko	26.7	Hungary (HUN); Szabolcs Detre; Zsolt Detre	32.4
Windglider	Nikolay Kravchenko (URS)	8.7	Sergey Samokish (URS)	14.0	László Keczéry (HUN)	39.4
Soling	East Germany (GDR); Helmar Nauck; Norbert Hellriegel; Sven Diedering	5.7	East Germany (GDR); Wolf Eberhard Richter; Bernd Jäkel; Thomas Flach	23.4	Soviet Union (URS); Boris Budnikov; Gennady Strakh; Oleg Miron	27.4
Star	Soviet Union (URS); Guram Biganishvili; Aleksandr Zybin	14.4	Soviet Union (URS); Andrey Balashov; Aleksandr Muzychenko	32.4	Canada (CAN); Steven Flekenstein; Robert Muru	34.8
Tornado	Soviet Union (URS); Serhiy Priymak; Edgar Teryokhin	5.7	Soviet Union (URS); Viktor Potapov; Sergey Kuzovov	25.0	Poland (POL); Krzysztof Zawalski; Ireneusz Butowski	62.4

== Medal table ==
* Host nation (Soviet Union)

Rank	Nation	Gold	Silver	Bronze	Total
1	Soviet Union (URS)*	5	1	1	7
2	East Germany (GDR)	2	0	2	4
3	Hungary (HUN)*	0	3	2	5
4	Poland (POL)	0	2	1	3
5	Canada (CAN)	0	1	0	1
6	Finland (FIN)	0	0	1	1
Totals (6 entries)		7	7	7	21

== See also ==
- Sailing at the 1984 Summer Olympics
