= Sailing at the 1980 Summer Olympics – 470 =

Sailing at the Olympics

470 at the Games of the XXII Olympiad
- 470
- Venue: Tallinn
- Dates: 21 to 29 July
- Competitors: 28 from 14 nations
- Teams: 14

Medalists
1st place, gold medalist(s)		Marcos Soares; Eduardo Henrique Penido	Brazil
2nd place, silver medalist(s)		Jörn Borowski; Egbert Swensson	East Germany
3rd place, bronze medalist(s)		Jouko Lindgrén; Georg Tallberg	Finland

The 470 competition was a sailing event in the 1980 Summer Olympics that were histed in Tallinn, USSR. Seven races were scheduled. 28 sailors, on 14 boats, from 14 nations competed.

== Results ==
Rank	Helmsman (Country)	Crew	Race I		Race II		Race III		Race IV		Race V		Race VI		Race VII		Total Points	Total -1
Rank	Helmsman (Country)	Crew	Rank	Points	Rank	Points	Rank	Points	Rank	Points	Rank	Points	Rank	Points	Rank	Points	Total Points	Total -1
1st place, gold medalist(s)	Marcos Soares (BRA)	Eduardo Penido	2	3.0	1	0.0	6	11.7	1	0.0	5	10.0	~~10~~	~~16.0~~	6	11.7	52.4	36.4
2nd place, silver medalist(s)	Jörn Borowski (GDR)	Egbert Swensson	5	10.0	8	14.0	1	0.0	~~9~~	~~15.0~~	6	11.7	1	0.0	2	3.0	53.7	38.7
3rd place, bronze medalist(s)	Jouko Lindgrén (FIN)	Georg Tallberg	4	8.0	2	3.0	3	5.7	5	10.0	~~9~~	~~15.0~~	7	13.0	1	0.0	54.7	39.7
4	Henk van Gent (NED)	Jan Willem van den Hondel	10	~~16.0~~	3	5.7	8	14.0	7	13.0	2	3.0	3	5.7	4	8.0	65.4	49.4
5	Leon Wróbel (POL)	Tomasz Stocki	1	0.0	9	15.0	7	13.0	4	8.0	1	0.0	~~11~~	~~17.0~~	12	18.0	71.0	53.0
6	Gustavo Doreste (ESP)	Alfredo Rigau	6	11.7	6	11.7	2	3.0	3	5.7	8	14.0	4	8.0	~~9~~	~~15.0~~	69.1	54.1
7	Ernesto Treves (ITA)	Silvio Necchi	3	5.7	5	10.0	~~10~~	~~16.0~~	10	16.0	7	13.0	2	3.0	5	10.0	73.7	57.7
8	Lars Bengtsson (SWE)	Stefan Bengtsson	7	13.0	7	13.0	4	8.0	2	3.0	~~11~~	~~17.0~~	5	10.0	7	13.0	77.0	60.0
9	François Kistler (SUI)	Jean-Luc Dreyer	9	15.0	~~11~~	~~17.0~~	5	10.0	6	11.7	4	8.0	6	11.7	3	5.7	79.1	62.1
10	Vladimir Ignatenko (URS)	Sergei Ždanov	8	14.0	4	8.0	9	15.0	8	14.0	2	3.0	~~DSQ~~	~~22.0~~	8	14.0	90.0	68.0
11	György Fundák (HUN)	Gábor Zalai	11	17.0	10	16.0	~~13~~	~~19.0~~	11	17.0	10	16.0	8	14.0	10	16.0	115.0	96.0
12	Ángel Jiménez (CUB)	Vicente de la Guardia	~~DSQ~~	~~22.0~~	12	18.0	11	17.0	12	18.0	14	20.0	9	15.0	11	17.0	127.0	105.0
13	Jeremy O'Connor (ZIM)	Robin O'Connor	12	18.0	~~13~~	~~19.0~~	12	18.0	13	19.0	12	18.0	12	18.0	13	19.0	129.0	110.0
14	Panagiotis Nikolaou (CYP)	Dimitrios Dimitriou	13	19.0	~~14~~	~~20.0~~	14	20.0	14	20.0	13	19.0	13	19.0	14	20.0	137.0	117.0

DNF = Did Not Finish, DNS= Did Not Start, DSQ = Disqualified, PMS = Premature Start, YMP = Yacht Materially Prejudiced
= Male, = Female

=== Daily standings ===
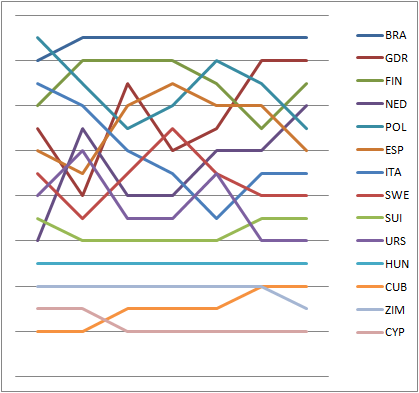
Graph showing the daily standings in the 470 during the 1980 Summer Olympics
