= Treves (surname) =

Treves is a surname. Notable people with the surname include:

- Abraham ben Solomon Treves (16th century), Italian rabbi
- Adrian Treves, American ecologist and academic
- Alex Treves (1929–2020), Italian-born American fencer
- Claudio Treves (1869–1933), Italian politician, father of Paolo
- Ernesto Treves (born 1951), Italian yacht racer
- Fabio Treves (born 1949), Italian musician
- Sir Frederick Treves, 1st Baronet (1853–1923), British surgeon
- Frederick Treves (actor) (1925–2012), English actor, great-nephew of Sir Frederick, father of Simon
- Naphtali Hirsch Treves (16th century), German kabbalist
- Paolo Treves (1908–1958), Italian politician, son of Claudio
- Renato Treves (1907–1992), Italian sociologist
- Simon Treves (born 1957), English actor, son of Frederick
- Vanni Treves (1940–2019), Italian-British television executive

== See also ==
- Trèves (surname)
