= Finland at the 2016 Summer Olympics =

- IOC code: FIN
- NOC: Finnish Olympic Committee
- Website: sport.fi/olympiakomitea (in Finnish and Swedish)

in Rio de Janeiro
- Competitors: 54 in 15 sports
- Flag bearer: Tuuli Petäjä-Sirén
- Medals Ranked 78th: Gold 0 Silver 0 Bronze 1 Total 1

Summer Olympics appearances (overview)
- 1908; 1912; 1920; 1924; 1928; 1932; 1936; 1948; 1952; 1956; 1960; 1964; 1968; 1972; 1976; 1980; 1984; 1988; 1992; 1996; 2000; 2004; 2008; 2012; 2016; 2020; 2024

Other related appearances
- 1906 Intercalated Games

Finland competed at the 2016 Summer Olympics in Rio de Janeiro, Brazil, from 5 to 21 August 2016. Finnish athletes have appeared in every edition of the Summer Olympic Games since the nation's official debut in 1908.

The Finnish Olympic Committee (Finnish: Suomen Olympiakomitea, SO) sent a team of 54 athletes, 26 men and 28 women, to compete in 15 sports at the Games. The nation's full roster also achieved a historic milestone, as the number of female athletes outnumbered the men for the first time. Among the sports represented by its athletes, Finland made its Olympic debut in golf (new to the 2016 Games), table tennis, and women's wrestling, as well as its return to archery, boxing, equestrian eventing, and rhythmic gymnastics after long years of absence.

The Finnish team featured four past Olympic medalists returning to the Games: Beijing 2008 women's trap champion Satu Mäkelä-Nummela, the oldest competitor of the roster (aged 43), javelin throwers Tero Pitkämäki and Antti Ruuskanen (both won bronze in 2008 and 2012, respectively), and windsurfer Tuuli Petäjä-Sirén (silver, 2012), who was appointed by the committee to carry the Finnish flag by a female for the second time in the opening ceremony. Despite swimming only in the medley relay, Hanna-Maria Seppälä set a record as the first ever Finnish female athlete to participate in five consecutive Olympic Games. Other notable competitors on the Finnish roster included the country's fastest freestyle swimmer Ari-Pekka Liukkonen, sailing brothers Joonas and Niklas Lindgren in the 470 class, and hammer thrower David Söderberg.

Finland left Rio de Janeiro with only a bronze medal, won by boxer Mira Potkonen in the women's lightweight event, conquered on the 12th day of the Games, when virtually all other Finnish athletes had ended their participation. This lone medal prevented the country for the first time in the history of the Summer Games from finishing without any medal in an edition, but it consolidated the worst performance in Finnish history at the Games. Several Finnish athletes reached the finals of their respective events including Ruuskanen (sixth, javelin throw), Söderberg (eighth, hammer throw), and sailor Tuula Tenkanen (fifth, Laser Radial).

== Medalists ==
| Medal | Name | Sport | Event | Date |
|---|---|---|---|---|
| Bronze | Mira Potkonen | Boxing | Women's lightweight | 17 August |

== Archery ==
One Finnish archer has qualified for the men's individual recurve at the Games by securing one of three available Olympic spots at the 2016 European Championships in Nottingham, Great Britain, signifying the nation's comeback to the sport after an eight-year hiatus. Meanwhile, another Finnish archer was added to the squad by virtue of a top six national finish in the women's individual recurve at the 2016 Archery World Cup meet in Antalya, Turkey.

| Athlete | Event | Ranking round | | Round of 64 | Round of 32 | Round of 16 | Quarterfinals | Semifinals | Final / BM | |
| Athlete | Event | Score | Seed | Opposition Score | Opposition Score | Opposition Score | Opposition Score | Opposition Score | Opposition Score | Rank |
|---|---|---|---|---|---|---|---|---|---|---|
| Samuli Piippo | Men's individual | 636 | 54 | Floto (GER); L 0–6 | Did not advance | | | | | |
| Taru Kuoppa | Women's individual | 643 | 14 | Htwe (MYA); L 3–7 | Did not advance | | | | | |

== Athletics ==
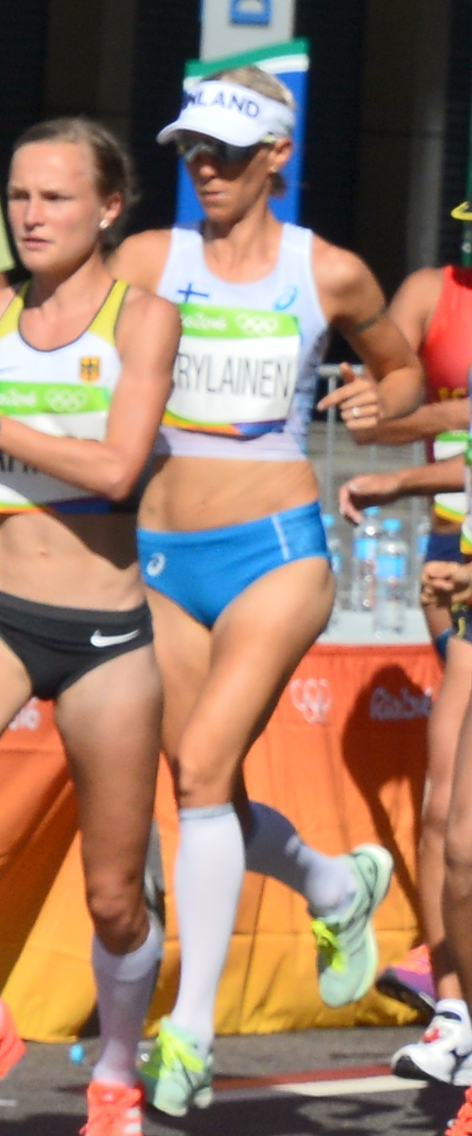
Anne-Mari Hyryläinen

Finnish athletes have so far achieved qualifying standards in the following athletics events (up to a maximum of 3 athletes in each event): Four of them, led by two Olympic bronze medalists Tero Pitkämäki (2008) and Antti Ruuskanen (2012) in the men's javelin throw, had been selected to the Olympic team during the initial nomination stages (October and December 2015), while the majority of the Finnish track and field team was announced at the end of March and the third week of July 2016.

Key

- Note–Ranks given for track events are within the athlete's heat only
- Q = Qualified for the next round
- q = Qualified for the next round as a fastest loser or, in field events, by position without achieving the qualifying target
- NR = National record
- N/A = Round not applicable for the event
- Bye = Athlete not required to compete in round

Track & road events
Men

| Athlete | Event | Heat | | Semifinal | | Final | |
| Athlete | Event | Result | Rank | Result | Rank | Result | Rank |
|---|---|---|---|---|---|---|---|
| Oskari Mörö | 400 m hurdles | 49.04 NR | 4 q | 49.75 | 7 | Did not advance | |
| Jarkko Kinnunen | 50 km walk | —N/a | | | | 3:55:43 | 22 |
| Aleksi Ojala | 50 km walk | —N/a | | | | DSQ | |
| Aku Partanen | 50 km walk | —N/a | | | | DNF | |

Women

| Athlete | Event | Heat | | Semifinal | | Final | |
| Athlete | Event | Result | Rank | Result | Rank | Result | Rank |
|---|---|---|---|---|---|---|---|
| Sandra Eriksson | 3000 m steeplechase | 9:56.77 | 15 | —N/a | | Did not advance | |
| Anne-Mari Hyryläinen | Marathon | —N/a | | | | 2:39:02 | 51 |
| Nooralotta Neziri | 100 m hurdles | 12.88 | 3 Q | 13.04 | 6 | Did not advance | |

Field events
Men

| Athlete | Event | Qualification | | Final | |
| Athlete | Event | Distance | Position | Distance | Position |
|---|---|---|---|---|---|
| Ari Mannio | Javelin throw | 77.73 | 27 | Did not advance | |
| Tero Pitkämäki | Javelin throw | 79.56 | 21 | Did not advance | |
| Antti Ruuskanen | Javelin throw | 82.20 | 11 q | 83.05 | 6 |
| David Söderberg | Hammer throw | 74.64 | 7 q | 74.61 | 8 |

Women

| Athlete | Event | Qualification | | Final | |
| Athlete | Event | Distance | Position | Distance | Position |
|---|---|---|---|---|---|
| Kristiina Mäkelä | Triple jump | 14.24 PB | 5 q | 13.95 | 12 |
| Wilma Murto | Pole vault | 4.30 | 24 | Did not advance | |
| Minna Nikkanen | Pole vault | 4.55 | 13 | Did not advance | |
| Linda Sandblom | High jump | 1.89 | 26 | Did not advance | |
| Sanni Utriainen | Javelin throw | 53.42 | 31 | Did not advance | |

== Badminton ==
Finland has qualified one badminton player for the women's singles into the Olympic tournament. Nanna Vainio had claimed her Olympic spot as one of top 34 individual shuttlers in the BWF World Rankings as of 5 May 2016.

| Athlete | Event | Group Stage | | | Elimination | Quarterfinal | Semifinal | Final / BM | |
| Athlete | Event | Opposition Score | Opposition Score | Rank | Opposition Score | Opposition Score | Opposition Score | Opposition Score | Rank |
|---|---|---|---|---|---|---|---|---|---|
| Nanna Vainio | Women's singles | Marín (ESP); L 6–21, 4–21 | Kjærsfeldt (DEN); L 9–21, 8–21 | 3 | Did not advance | | | | |

== Boxing ==
Finland has entered one boxer to compete in the women's lightweight division into the Olympic boxing tournament, signifying the nation's comeback to the sport since 2000. Mira Potkonen had claimed her Olympic spot with a quarterfinal victory at the World Championships in Astana, Kazakhstan.

| Athlete | Event | Round of 16 | Quarterfinals | Semifinals | Final | |
| Athlete | Event | Opposition Result | Opposition Result | Opposition Result | Opposition Result | Rank |
|---|---|---|---|---|---|---|
| Mira Potkonen | Women's lightweight | Araújo (BRA); W 2–1 | Taylor (IRL); W 2–1 | Yin Jh (CHN); L 0–3 | Did not advance | 3rd place, bronze medalist(s) |

== Cycling ==
=== Road ===
Finland has qualified one rider in the women's Olympic road race by virtue of a top 22 national finish in the 2016 UCI World Rankings.

| Athlete | Event | Time | Rank |
|---|---|---|---|
| Lotta Lepistö | Women's road race | Did not finish | |
| Lotta Lepistö | Women's time trial | 47:06.52 | 17 |

== Equestrian ==
Finland has entered one eventing rider into the Olympic equestrian competition by virtue of a top finish from North Western Europe in the individual FEI Olympic rankings, signifying the nation's Olympic comeback to the sporting discipline for the first time since 2000.

=== Eventing ===
| Athlete | Horse | Event | Dressage | | Cross-country | | | Jumping | | | | | | Total | |
| Athlete | Horse | Event | Dressage | | Cross-country | | | Qualifier | | | Final | | | Total | |
| Athlete | Horse | Event | Penalties | Rank | Penalties | Total | Rank | Penalties | Total | Rank | Penalties | Total | Rank | Penalties | Rank |
|---|---|---|---|---|---|---|---|---|---|---|---|---|---|---|---|
| Elmo Jankari | Duchess Désirée | Individual | 48.00 | 37 | 42.80 | 90.80 | 28 | 10.00 | 100.80 | 31 | Did not advance | | | 100.80 | 31 |

== Golf ==
Finland has entered four golfers (two per gender) into the Olympic tournament. Mikko Ilonen (world no. 235), Roope Kakko (world no. 293), Noora Tamminen (world no. 274), and Ursula Wikström (world no. 256) qualified directly among the top 60 eligible players for their respective individual events based on the IGF World Rankings as of 11 July 2016.

| Athlete | Event | Round 1 | Round 2 | Round 3 | Round 4 | Total | | |
| Athlete | Event | Score | Score | Score | Score | Score | Par | Rank |
|---|---|---|---|---|---|---|---|---|
| Mikko Ilonen | Men's | 73 | 69 | 66 | 73 | 281 | −3 | =21 |
| Roope Kakko | Men's | 72 | 76 | 68 | 70 | 286 | +2 | =43 |
| Noora Tamminen | Women's | 73 | 76 | 72 | 74 | 295 | +11 | =48 |
| Ursula Wikström | Women's | 69 | 71 | 81 | 73 | 294 | +10 | =44 |

== Gymnastics ==
=== Artistic ===
Finland has entered one artistic gymnast into the Olympic competition. Oskar Kirmes had claimed his Olympic spot in the men's apparatus and all-around events at the Olympic Test Event in Rio de Janeiro.

Men

| Athlete | Event | Qualification | | | | | | | | Final | | | | | | | |
| Athlete | Event | Apparatus | | | | | | Total | Rank | Apparatus | | | | | | Total | Rank |
| Athlete | Event | F | PH | R | V | PB | HB | Total | Rank | F | PH | R | V | PB | HB | Total | Rank |
|---|---|---|---|---|---|---|---|---|---|---|---|---|---|---|---|---|---|
| Oskar Kirmes | All-around | 14.933 | 14.000 | 13.833 | 14.200 | 13.891 | 13.266 | 84.123 | 35 | Did not advance | | | | | | | |

=== Rhythmic ===
For the first time since 2000, Finland has qualified one rhythmic gymnast in the individual all-around for the Games by claiming one of eight available Olympic spots at the Olympic Test Event in Rio de Janeiro.

| Athlete | Event | Qualification | | | | | | Final | | | | | |
| Athlete | Event | Hoop | Ball | Clubs | Ribbon | Total | Rank | Hoop | Ball | Clubs | Ribbon | Total | Rank |
|---|---|---|---|---|---|---|---|---|---|---|---|---|---|
| Ekaterina Volkova | Individual | 16.916 | 16.966 | 17.000 | 16.633 | 67.515 | 21 | Did not advance | | | | | |

== Judo ==
Finland has qualified one judoka for the men's extra-lightweight category (60 kg) at the Games. Juho Reinvall earned a continental quota spot from the European region as the highest-ranked Finnish judoka outside of direct qualifying position in the IJF World Ranking List of 30 May 2016.

| Athlete | Event | Round of 64 | Round of 32 | Round of 16 | Quarterfinals | Semifinals | Repechage | Final / BM | |
| Athlete | Event | Opposition Result | Opposition Result | Opposition Result | Opposition Result | Opposition Result | Opposition Result | Opposition Result | Rank |
|---|---|---|---|---|---|---|---|---|---|
| Juho Reinvall | Men's −60 kg | Bye | Tsogtbaatar (MGL); L 000–011 | Did not advance | | | | | |

== Sailing ==
Finnish sailors have qualified one boat in each of the following classes through the 2014 ISAF Sailing World Championships, the individual fleet Worlds, and European qualifying regattas.

On 13 October 2015, the Finnish Olympic Committee had officially announced the first five sailors competing in the Finn, Laser Radial, men's 470, and women's RS:X at the Rio regatta. 2010 Youth Olympian and Laser sailor Kaarle Tapper was named to the Finnish team on 27 April 2016, while the women's 470 and 49er crews rounded out the selection at the ISAF World Cup meet (26 April to 1 May) in Hyères, France.

Men

| Athlete | Event | Race | | | | | | | | | | | Net points | Final rank |
| Athlete | Event | 1 | 2 | 3 | 4 | 5 | 6 | 7 | 8 | 9 | 10 | M | Net points | Final rank |
|---|---|---|---|---|---|---|---|---|---|---|---|---|---|---|
| Kaarle Tapper | Laser | ~~32~~ | 12 | 31 | 29 | 27 | 18 | 17 | 11 | 23 | 19 | EL | 187 | 26 |
| Tapio Nirkko | Finn | 20 | 7 | 15 | 5 | 3 | ~~24~~ | 20 | 21 | 6 | 10 | EL | 107 | 15 |
| Joonas Lindgren; Niklas Lindgren | 470 | 20 | 11 | 23 | 18 | ~~24~~ | 19 | 3 | 10 | 9 | 10 | EL | 123 | 16 |

Women

| Athlete | Event | Race | | | | | | | | | | | | | Net points | Final rank |
| Athlete | Event | 1 | 2 | 3 | 4 | 5 | 6 | 7 | 8 | 9 | 10 | 11 | 12 | M | Net points | Final rank |
|---|---|---|---|---|---|---|---|---|---|---|---|---|---|---|---|---|
| Tuuli Petäjä-Sirén | RS:X | 4 | 9 | 8 | 5 | 9 | 5 | ~~27~~ | 3 | 12 | 10 | 6 | 8 | 20 | 99 | 10 |
| Tuula Tenkanen | Laser Radial | 4 | ~~16~~ | 8.6 | 2 | 14 | 3 | 13 | 8 | 2 | 14 | —N/a | | 18 | 86.6 | 5 |
| Noora Ruskola; Camilla Cedercreutz | 49erFX | 7 | 12 | 16 | 13 | ~~21~~ | 15 | 14 | 15 | 14 | 10 | 20 | 18 | EL | 154 | 17 |

M = Medal race; EL = Eliminated – did not advance into the medal race; overstrike indicates excluded score

== Shooting ==
Finnish shooters have achieved quota places for the following events by virtue of their best finishes at the 2014 and 2015 ISSF World Championships, the 2015 ISSF World Cup series, and European Championships or Games, as long as they obtained a minimum qualifying standard (MQS) by 31 March 2016.

| Athlete | Event | Qualification | | Semifinal | | Final | |
| Athlete | Event | Points | Rank | Points | Rank | Points | Rank |
|---|---|---|---|---|---|---|---|
| Vesa Törnroos | Men's trap | 116 | 11 | Did not advance | | | |
| Satu Mäkelä-Nummela | Women's trap | 66 | 10 | Did not advance | | | |

== Swimming ==
Finnish swimmers have so far achieved qualifying standards in the following events (up to a maximum of 2 swimmers in each event at the Olympic Qualifying Time (OQT), and potentially 1 at the Olympic Selection Time (OST)):

On 9 December 2015, the Finnish Olympic Committee had announced the first three swimmers (Liukkonen, Mattsson, and Laukkanen), who had achieved the A-cut times in their respective events, to compete in the Olympic pool, while US-based college swimmers Matias Koski and Tanja Kylliäinen joined the roster four months later.

Men

| Athlete | Event | Heat | | Semifinal | | Final | |
| Athlete | Event | Time | Rank | Time | Rank | Time | Rank |
|---|---|---|---|---|---|---|---|
| Matias Koski | 200 m freestyle | 1:47.40 | 21 | Did not advance | | | |
| Matias Koski | 400 m freestyle | 3:55.57 | 42 | —N/a | | Did not advance | |
| Ari-Pekka Liukkonen | 50 m freestyle | 22.25 | 23 | Did not advance | | | |
| Ari-Pekka Liukkonen | 100 m freestyle | 50.14 | 42 | Did not advance | | | |
| Matti Mattsson | 100 m breaststroke | 1:02.45 | 38 | Did not advance | | | |
| Matti Mattsson | 200 m breaststroke | 2:10.49 | 11 Q | 2:12.99 | 16 | Did not advance | |

Women

| Athlete | Event | Heat | | Semifinal | | Final | |
| Athlete | Event | Time | Rank | Time | Rank | Time | Rank |
|---|---|---|---|---|---|---|---|
| Mimosa Jallow | 100 m backstroke | 1:01.58 | 24 | Did not advance | | | |
| Jenna Laukkanen | 100 m breaststroke | 1:07.35 NR | 18 | Did not advance | | | |
| Jenna Laukkanen | 200 m breaststroke | 2:25.52 | 14 Q | 2:25.14 NR | 14 | Did not advance | |
| Tanja Kylliäinen | 200 m individual medley | 2:14.97 | 25 | Did not advance | | | |
| Tanja Kylliäinen | 400 m individual medley | 4:45.33 NR | 25 | —N/a | | Did not advance | |
| Mimosa Jallow; Jenna Laukkanen; Emilia Pikkarainen; Hanna-Maria Seppälä | 4 × 100 m medley relay | 4:01.61 | 11 | —N/a | | Did not advance | |

== Table tennis ==
Finland has entered one athlete for the first time into the Olympic table tennis competition. Benedek Oláh granted an invitation from ITTF to compete in the men's singles as one of the next seven highest-ranked eligible players, not yet qualified, on the Olympic Ranking List.

| Athlete | Event | Preliminary | Round 1 | Round 2 | Round 3 | Round of 16 | Quarterfinals | Semifinals | Final / BM | |
| Athlete | Event | Opposition Result | Opposition Result | Opposition Result | Opposition Result | Opposition Result | Opposition Result | Opposition Result | Opposition Result | Rank |
|---|---|---|---|---|---|---|---|---|---|---|
| Benedek Oláh | Men's singles | Bye | Chen F (SIN); W 4–1 | Groth (DEN); L 0–4 | Did not advance | | | | | |

== Taekwondo ==
Finland entered one athlete into the taekwondo competition at the Olympics. 2012 Olympian Suvi Mikkonen secured a spot in the women's lightweight category (57 kg) by virtue of her top two finish at the 2016 European Qualification Tournament in Istanbul, Turkey.

| Athlete | Event | Round of 16 | Quarterfinals | Semifinals | Repechage | Final / BM | |
| Athlete | Event | Opposition Result | Opposition Result | Opposition Result | Opposition Result | Opposition Result | Rank |
|---|---|---|---|---|---|---|---|
| Suvi Mikkonen | Women's −57 kg | Vasconcelos (BRA); W 10–9 | Glasnović (SWE); L 4–7 | Did not advance | | | |

== Weightlifting ==
Finland has qualified one male weightlifter for the Rio Olympics by virtue of a top seven national finish at the 2016 European Championships. Meanwhile, an unused women's Olympic spot was added to the Finnish weightlifting team by IWF, as a response to the vacancy of women's quota places in the individual World Rankings and to the "multiple positive cases" of doping on several nations. The team must allocate these places to individual athletes by 20 June 2016.

| Athlete | Event | Snatch | | Clean & Jerk | | Total | Rank |
| Athlete | Event | Result | Rank | Result | Rank | Total | Rank |
|---|---|---|---|---|---|---|---|
| Milko Tokola | Men's −85 kg | 145 | 20 | 175 | 19 | 320 | 19 |
| Anni Vuohijoki | Women's −63 kg | 85 | 11 | 107 | 10 | 192 | 10 |

== Wrestling ==
Finland has qualified three wrestlers for each of the following weight classes into the Olympic tournament. Two of them finished among the top six to book an Olympic spot each in the men's Greco-Roman 85 kg and women's freestyle 58 kg the 2015 World Championships.

One more wrestler had claimed the remaining Olympic slot in the men's Greco-Roman 66 kg to round out the Finnish roster at the initial meet of the World Qualification Tournament in Ulaanbaatar.

Key:

- VT – Victory by Fall.
- PP – Decision by Points – the loser with technical points.
- PO – Decision by Points – the loser without technical points.
- ST – Technical superiority – the loser without technical points and a margin of victory of at least 8 (Greco-Roman) or 10 (freestyle) points.

Men's Greco-Roman

| Athlete | Event | Qualification | Round of 16 | Quarterfinal | Semifinal | Repechage 1 | Repechage 2 | Final / BM | |
| Athlete | Event | Opposition Result | Opposition Result | Opposition Result | Opposition Result | Opposition Result | Opposition Result | Opposition Result | Rank |
|---|---|---|---|---|---|---|---|---|---|
| Tero Välimäki | −66 kg | Bye | Bolkvadze (GEO); L 0–3 ^{PO} | Did not advance | | | | | 15 |
| Rami Hietaniemi | −85 kg | Bye | Hrustanović (AUT); L 1–3 ^{PP} | Did not advance | | | | | 11 |

Women's freestyle

| Athlete | Event | Qualification | Round of 16 | Quarterfinal | Semifinal | Repechage 1 | Repechage 2 | Final / BM | |
| Athlete | Event | Opposition Result | Opposition Result | Opposition Result | Opposition Result | Opposition Result | Opposition Result | Opposition Result | Rank |
|---|---|---|---|---|---|---|---|---|---|
| Petra Olli | −58 kg | Bye | Adeniyi (NGR); W 3–1 ^{PP} | Tynybekova (KGZ); L 1–3 ^{PP} | Did not advance | | | | 10 |

== See also ==
- Finland at the 2016 Summer Paralympics
