= Sailing at the 1980 Summer Olympics – Finn =

Finn class at the Games of the XXII Olympiad
- Finn class dinghy
- Venue: Tallinn
- Dates: 21 to 29 July
- Competitors: 21 from 21 nations
- Teams: 21

Medalists
1st place, gold medalist(s)		Esko Rechardt	Finland
2nd place, silver medalist(s)		Wolfgang Mayrhofer	Austria
3rd place, bronze medalist(s)		Andrei Balashov	Soviet Union

The Finn was a sailing event on the Sailing at the 1980 Summer Olympics program in Tallinn, USSR. The Finn dinghy is the men's single-handed, cat-rigged Olympic class for sailing. Seven races were scheduled; 21 sailors, on 21 boats, from 21 nations competed.

== Final results ==
Rank	Helmsman (Country)	Race I		Race II		Race III		Race IV		Race V		Race VI		Race VII		Total Points	Total -1
Rank	Helmsman (Country)	Rank	Points	Rank	Points	Rank	Points	Rank	Points	Rank	Points	Rank	Points	Rank	Points	Total Points	Total -1
1st place, gold medalist(s)	Esko Rechardt (FIN)	4	8.0	1	0.0	4	8.0	~~DSQ~~	~~28.0~~	3	5.7	1	0.0	9	15.0	64.7	36.7
2nd place, silver medalist(s)	Wolfgang Mayrhofer (AUT)	1	0.0	6	11.7	7	13.0	~~11~~	~~17.0~~	2	3.0	2	3.0	10	16.0	63.7	46.7
3rd place, bronze medalist(s)	Andrei Balashov (URS)	6	11.7	14	20.0	3	5.7	1	0.0	5	10.0	~~16~~	~~22.0~~	1	0.0	69.4	47.4
4	Cláudio Biekarck (BRA)	9	15.0	5	10.0	1	0.0	~~13~~	~~19.0~~	9	15.0	5	10.0	2	3.0	72.0	53.0
5	Jochen Schümann (GDR)	3	5.7	3	5.7	2	3.0	8	14.0	7	13.0	7	13.0	~~16~~	~~22.0~~	76.4	54.4
6	Kent Carlson (SWE)	2	3.0	12	18.0	15	21.0	4	8.0	4	8.0	3	5.7	~~DNF~~	~~28.0~~	91.7	63.7
7	Ryszard Skarbiński (POL)	7	13.0	~~17~~	~~23.0~~	8	14.0	6	11.7	6	11.7	9	15.0	3	5.7	94.1	71.1
8	Mark Neeleman (NED)	5	10.0	11	17.0	12	18.0	7	13.0	~~18~~	~~24.0~~	4	8.0	5	10.0	100.0	76.0
9	István Ruják (HUN)	~~DSQ~~	~~28.0~~	8	14.0	6	11.7	5	10.0	12	18.0	12	18.0	6	11.7	111.4	83.4
10	Ilias Hatzipavlis (GRE)	~~DSQ~~	~~28.0~~	16	22.0	9	15.0	12	18.0	1	0.0	10	16.0	12	18.0	117.0	89.0
11	Minski Fabris (YUG)	13	19.0	4	8.0	10	16.0	14	20.0	~~DNF~~	~~28.0~~	6	11.7	11	17.0	119.7	91.7
12	Ivor Ganahl (SUI)	12	18.0	7	13.0	5	10.0	9	15.0	~~17~~	~~23.0~~	11	17.0	17	23.0	119.0	96.0
13	Lasse Hjortnæs (DEN)	~~DSQ~~	~~28.0~~	2	3.0	21	27.0	2	3.0	8	14.0	18	24.0	DNF	28.0	127.0	99.0
14	Josef Šenkýř (TCH)	~~DSQ~~	~~28.0~~	13	19.0	14	20.0	15	21.0	11	17.0	13	19.0	4	8.0	132.0	104.0
15	Mihai Butucaru (ROM)	10	16.0	19	25.0	18	24.0	10	16.0	13	19.0	~~19~~	~~25.0~~	8	14.0	139.0	114.0
16	Peter Wilson (ZIM)	8	14.0	9	15.0	16	22.0	~~17~~	~~23.0~~	15	21.0	17	23.0	15	21.0	139.0	116.0
17	José Luis Doreste (ESP)	~~DSQ~~	~~28.0~~	DSQ	28.0	13	19.0	3	5.7	DNF	28.0	8	14.0	DNF	28.0	150.7	122.7
18	Nikolay Vasilev (BUL)	~~DSQ~~	~~28.0~~	18	24.0	11	17.0	16	22.0	14	20.0	DNF	28.0	7	13.0	152.0	124.0
19	Juan Maegli (GUA)	~~DSQ~~	~~28.0~~	15	21.0	17	23.0	19	25.0	10	16.0	15	21.0	13	19.0	153.0	125.0
20	Alberto Gallardo (CUB)	~~DSQ~~	~~28.0~~	10	16.0	19	25.0	18	24.0	16	22.0	14	20.0	14	20.0	155.0	127.0
21	Panikos Rimis (CYP)	11	17.0	~~DNS~~	~~28.0~~	20	26.0	20	26.0	DNF	28.0	20	26.0	18	24.0	175.0	147.0

DNF = Did not finish, DNS= Did not start, DSQ = Disqualified, PMS = Premature start, YMP = Yacht materially prejudiced
= Male, = Female

=== Daily standings ===
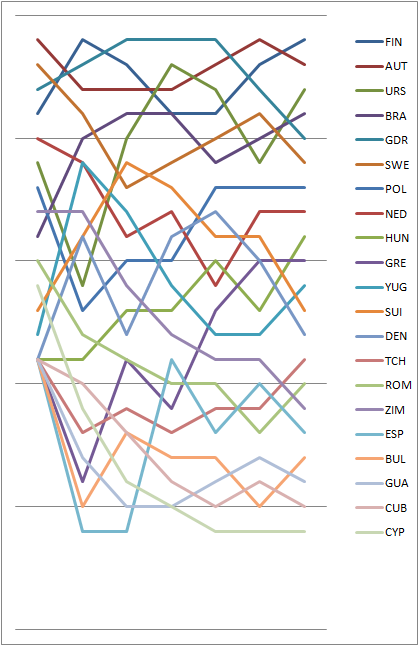
Graph showing the daily standings in the Finn during the 1980 Summer Olympics
