= Niklas Lindgren (sailor) =

Finnish sailor

Personal information
- Nickname: Niksu
- Nationality: Finland
- Born: 18 May 1988 (age 38) Helsinki, Finland
- Height: 1.75 m (5 ft 9 in)
- Weight: 63 kg (139 lb)

Sailing career
- Sport: Sailing
- Club: Helsingfors Segelklubb
- Coached by: Jouko Lindgren
- Class: Dinghy

Niklas Lindgren (born 18 May 1988 in Helsinki) is a Finnish sailor, who specializes in two-person dinghy (470) class. He represented Finland in two editions of the Olympic Games (2008 and 2012), and has also been training for the Helsinki Sailing Club (Helsingfors Segelklubb) throughout most of his sporting career. His father and personal coach Jouko Lindgren shared bronze medals with Georg Tallberg in the same program at the 1980 Summer Olympics in Moscow. As of September 2013, Lindgren is ranked no. 304 in the world for two-person dinghy class by the International Sailing Federation.

Lindgren made his Olympic debut at the 2008 Summer Olympics in Beijing, where he paired with crew member Heikki Elomaa in the men's 470 class. The Finnish duo finished twenty-seventh in a ten-round opening series with a mediocre net score of 196, edging out the Turkish brothers Deniz and Ateş Çınar by a narrow, two-point gap in the final standings.

At the 2012 Summer Olympics in London, Lindgren competed as a crew member in the men's 470 class. His team received a berth by finishing twenty-second at the ISAF World Championships in Perth, Western Australia. Teaming with his older brother and skipper Joonas Lindgren in the opening series, the Finnish duo accumulated a net score of 167 to claim twenty-first spot in a fleet of twenty-seven boats.

At the 2016 Olympics, Lindgren again teamed with his brother Joonas to compete in the 470 class. The boat finished in 15th out of a total of 26 boats with a total of 123 points.
