= Joonas Lindgren =

Finnish sailor

Personal information
- Nationality: Finland
- Born: 31 May 1986 (age 40) Helsinki, Finland
- Height: 1.70 m (5 ft 7 in)
- Weight: 64 kg (141 lb)

Sailing career
- Sport: Sailing
- Club: Helsingfors Segelklubb
- Coached by: Jouko Lindgren
- Class: Dinghy

Joonas Lindgren (born 31 May 1986 in Helsinki) is a Finnish sailor, who specialized in two-person dinghy (470) class. He represented Finland at the 2012 Summer Olympics, and has also been training for the Helsinki Sailing Club (Helsingfors Segelklubb) throughout most of his sporting career. His father and personal coach Jouko Lindgren shared bronze medals with Georg Tallberg in the same program at the 1980 Summer Olympics in Moscow. As of September 2013, Lindgren is ranked no. 33 in the world for two-person dinghy class by the International Sailing Federation.

Lindgren competed as a skipper in the men's 470 class at the 2012 Summer Olympics in London by finishing twenty-second and receiving a berth from the ISAF World Championships in Perth, Western Australia. Teaming with his younger brother and skipper Niklas Lindgren in the opening series, the Finnish duo accumulated a net score of 167 to claim a twenty-first spot in a fleet of twenty-seven boats.
