= Alberto Gallardo Álvarez =

Cuban sailor (born 1962)

Alberto Gallardo
Personal information
- Born: Alberto Gallardo Álvarez; 25 June 1962 (age 63) Playa, Matanzas, Cuba
- Height: 5 ft 10 in (178 cm)

Sport
- Country: Cuba
- Sport: Sailing
- Event(s): Finn; Laser

Achievements and titles
- Olympic finals: 1980 Summer Olympic Games Moscow

Alberto Gallardo Álvarez (born 25 June 1962), known as Alberto Gallardo, is a Cuban athlete and former Olympian in the sport of sailing. He was the youngest competitor for the Finn class at the 1980 Summer Olympic Games in Moscow.

Born and raised in La Playa, Matanzas, Cuba, he became a national sensation for displaying, since a young age, an unsurpassed talent in sailing, specifically on the Finn class. He passed all the qualifying events and dodged a number of elimination races or regattas, against known and established national competitors, before being informed that he was, according to the national rankings, the sole qualifier, who would represent Cuba in Sailing at the 1980 Summer Olympic Games in the Finn class, which would be held in Tallinn, USSR.

During the event at the 1980 Summer Olympic Games Finn competition, he successfully finished all the races. Despite a disqualification in the first regatta, which set him back in the overall rankings, he was able to finish among the best ten Finn competitors in the world during the second race.
