= Sailing at the 1980 Summer Olympics =

Sailing at the Games of the XXII Olympiad
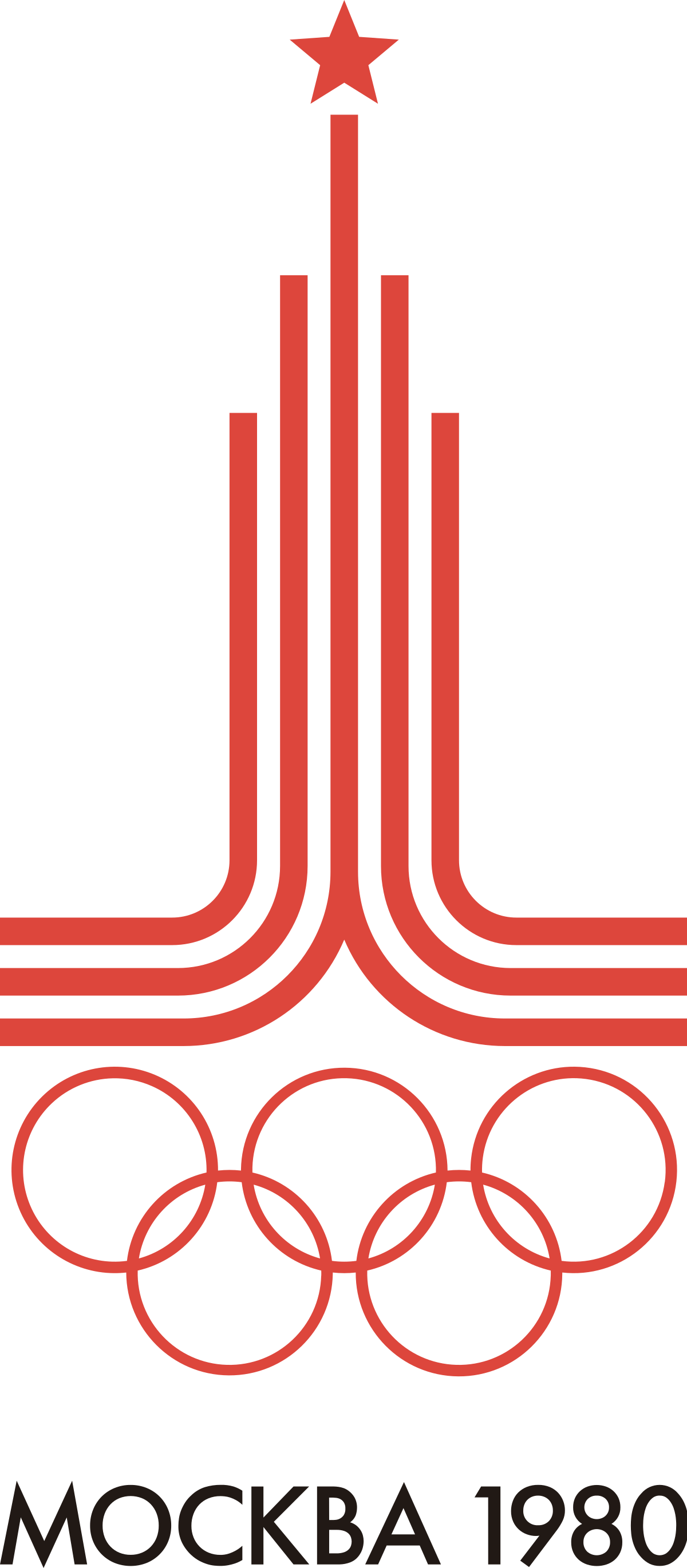
- Logo for the 1980 Summer Olympics in Moscow
- Venues: Tallinn Olympic Yachting Centre, Tallinn, Estonian SSR, Soviet Union
- Dates: First race: 21 July 1980; Last race: 29 July 1980
- Competitors: 156 (all male) from 23 nations
- Boats: 83

Sailing/Yachting is an Olympic sport starting from the Games of the 1st Olympiad (1896 Olympics in Athens, Greece). With the exception of 1904 and the canceled 1916 Summer Olympics, sailing has always been included on the Olympic schedule. The Sailing program of 1980 consisted of a total of six sailing classes (disciplines). For each class seven races were scheduled from 19 to 29 July 1980 of the coast of Tallinn (district of Pirita, in present-day Estonia), in that time an illegally annexed part of the USSR at the Baltic Sea. The sailing was done on the triangular type Olympic courses.

== Venue ==
The Olympic Yachting Centre in Pirita (pictured in 2005)
- Pirita Olympic Yachting Center
- Interactive map of the The Olympic Yachting Centre in Pirita (pictured in 2005) area

General information
- Location: Tallinn, Estonia
- Coordinates: 59°28′13″N 24°49′6″E

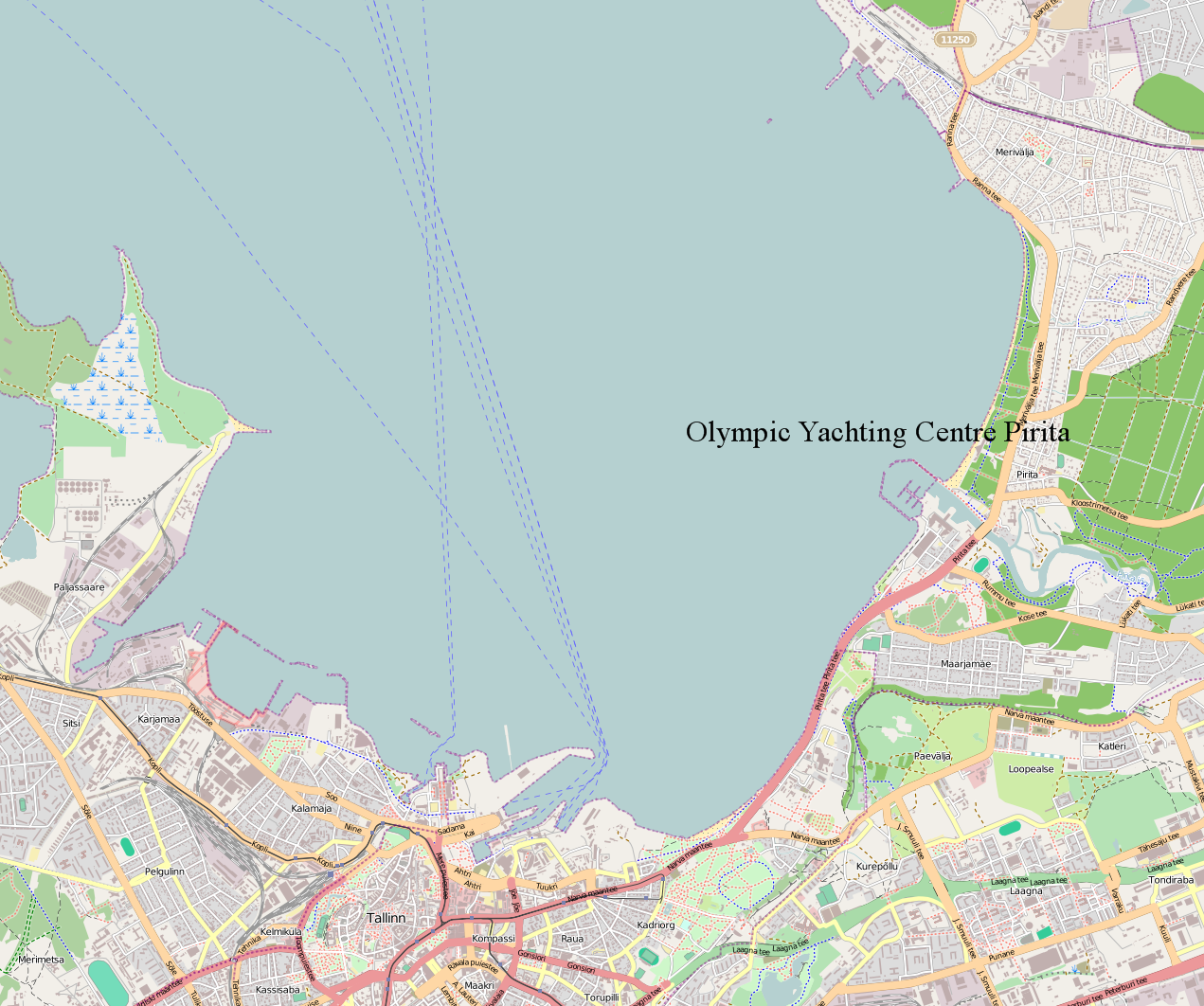
Olympic Yachting Centre 1980.

According to the IOC statutes the contests in all sport disciplines must be held either in, or as close as possible to the city which the IOC has chosen. Since Moscow was not a suitable place the Olympic Yachting Centre in Pirita Tallinn was constructed for the 1980 Olympic Sailing event.

== Competition ==
=== Overview ===
| Continents | Countries | Classes | Boats | Male | Female |
|---|---|---|---|---|---|
| 3 | 23 | 6 | 83 | 156 | 0 |

=== Continents ===
- Europe
- Africa
- Americas

=== Countries ===
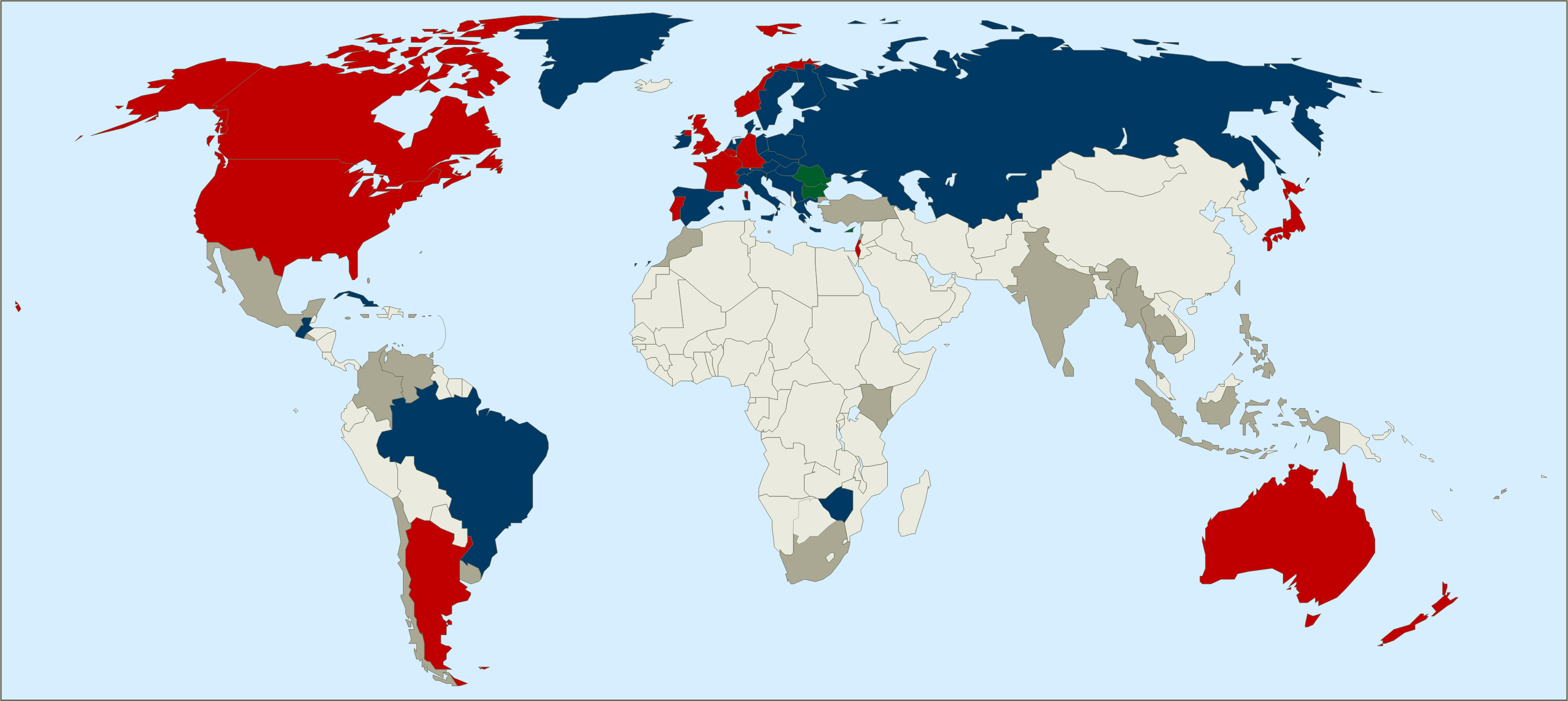
Countries that participated in the Sailing event of the 1980 Olympic Games. Blue: Water Gray: Never participated in OG Dark Gray: Participated in earlier OG Green: Country participated for the first time Dark Blue: Country participated also on previous games Red: Country boycotted the sailing event of the OG

| Austria | Brazil | Bulgaria |
| Cuba | Cyprus | Denmark |
| Spain | Finland | East Germany |
| Greece | Guatemala | Hungary |
| Ireland | Italy | Netherlands |
| Poland | Romania | Switzerland |
| Sweden | Czechoslovakia | Soviet Union |
| Yugoslavia | Zimbabwe |

=== 1980 Olympic boycott ===
The boycott affected the medalists in most sailing events with a number of European and World champions not participating. In the Soiling, the Canadian World champion team of Glen Dexter, Andreas Josenhans and [Sandy McMillan] was absent. Some British athletes participated in the Games under a neutral flag, but the sailing federation chose to join the boycott. In several classes an alternative sailing event was organized by the boycotting nations, with the Flying Dutchman class having been held Luxembourg. Other significant countries that choose not to participate included the Australian team.

Canadian Olympic Boycott Party

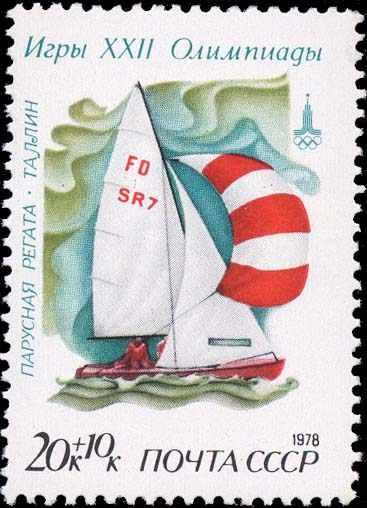
The Flying Dutchman on a Russian stamp, issued for the Olympics in 1978

=== Classes (equipment) ===
| Class | Type | Event | Sailors | Trapeze | Mainsail | Jib/Genoa | Spinnaker | First OG | Olympics so far |
|---|---|---|---|---|---|---|---|---|---|
| Finn | Dinghy | | 1 | 0 | + | – | – | 1952 | 8 |
| 470 | Dinghy | | 2 | 1 | + | + | + | 1976 | 2 |
| Flying Dutchman | Dinghy | | 2 | 1 | + | + | + | 1960 | 6 |
| Tornado | Catamaran | | 2 | 1 | + | + | – | 1976 | 2 |
| Star | Keelboat | | 2 | 0 | + | + | – | 1932 | 10 |
| Soling | Keelboat | | 3 | 0 | + | + | + | 1972 | 3 |

1980 Olympic Classes designs

== Medal summary ==
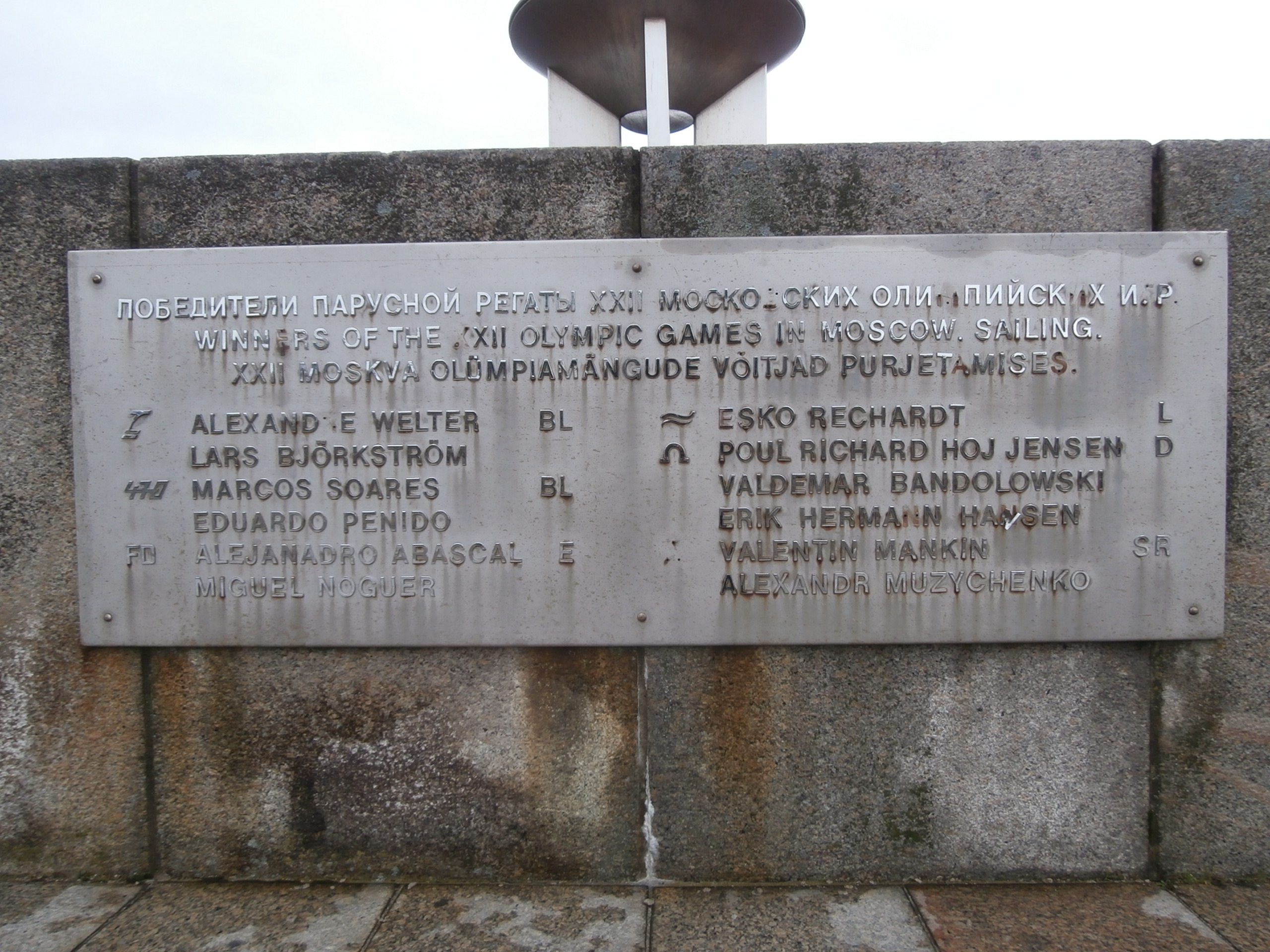
Winners of the XXII Olympic Games in Moscow. Sailing.

| Event | Gold | Silver | Bronze |
|---|---|---|---|
| 1980: Finn | Finland (FIN); Esko Rechardt | Austria (AUT); Wolfgang Mayrhofer | Soviet Union (URS); Andrei Balashov |
| 1980: 470 | Brazil (BRA); Marcos Soares; Eduardo Penido | East Germany (GDR); Jörn Borowski; Egbert Swensson | Finland (FIN); Jouko Lindgrén; Georg Tallberg |
| 1980: Flying Dutchman | Spain (ESP); Alejandro Abascal; Miguel Noguer | Ireland (IRL); David Wilkins; James Wilkinson | Hungary (HUN); Szabolcs Detre; Zsolt Detre |
| 1980: Tornado | Brazil (BRA); Lars Sigurd Björkström; Alexandre Welter | Denmark (DEN); Peter Due; Per Kjergard | Sweden (SWE); Göran Marström; Jörgen Ragnarsson |
| 1980: Star | Soviet Union (URS); Valentin Mankin; Aleksandr Muzychenko | Austria (AUT); Hubert Raudaschl; Karl Ferstl | Italy (ITA); Giorgio Gorla; Alfio Peraboni |
| 1980: Soling | Denmark (DEN); Poul Richard Høj Jensen; Valdemar Bandolowski; Erik Hansen | Soviet Union (URS); Boris Budnikov; Alexandr Budnikov; Nikolay Poliakov | Greece (GRE); Anastasios Bountouris; Anastasios Gavrilis; Aristidis Rapanakis |

== Medal table ==
| Rank | Nation | Gold | Silver | Bronze | Total |
|---|---|---|---|---|---|
| 1 | Brazil | 2 | 0 | 0 | 2 |
| 2 | Soviet Union | 1 | 1 | 1 | 3 |
| 3 | Denmark | 1 | 1 | 0 | 2 |
| 4 | Finland | 1 | 0 | 1 | 2 |
| 5 | Spain | 1 | 0 | 0 | 1 |
| 6 | Austria | 0 | 2 | 0 | 2 |
| 7 | East Germany | 0 | 1 | 0 | 1 |
| 7 | Ireland | 0 | 1 | 0 | 1 |
| 9 | Greece | 0 | 0 | 1 | 1 |
| 9 | Hungary | 0 | 0 | 1 | 1 |
| 9 | Italy | 0 | 0 | 1 | 1 |
| 9 | Sweden | 0 | 0 | 1 | 1 |
| Totals (12 entries) | | 6 | 6 | 6 | 18 |

== Remarks ==
=== Sailors ===
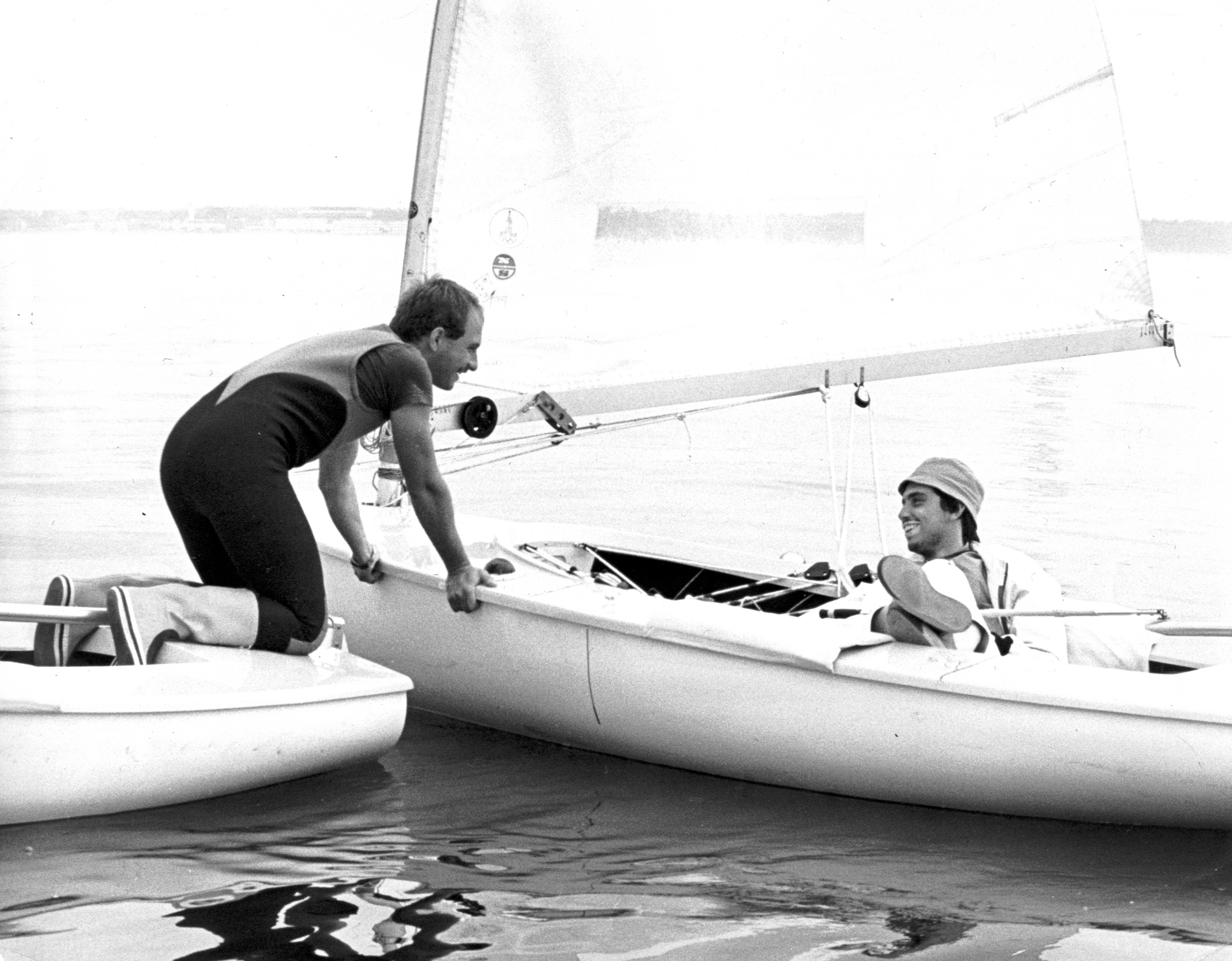
In the Finn (left): Mihai Butucaru

During the sailing regattas at the 1980 Summer Olympics among others the following persons were competing in the various classes:

- Soviet Union, Valentin Mankin, multi-medalist in the Star
- Romania, Mihai Butucaru, later committee member of Eurosaf

== Sources ==
- I. T. Novikov, ed. (1981). Games of the XXII Olympiad, Volume I: Organization (PDF). Moscow: OCOG-80. Archived from the original (PDF) on 15 August 2012.
- I. T. Novikov, ed. (1981). Games of the XXII Olympiad, Volume II: Facilities (PDF). Moscow: OCOG-80. Archived from the original (PDF) on 28 October 2012.
- I. T. Novikov, ed. (1981). Games of the XXII Olympiad, Volume III: Results (PDF). Moscow: OCOG-80. Archived from the original (PDF) on 16 July 2012.
- Evans, Hilary; Gjerde, Arild; Heijmans, Jeroen; Mallon, Bill; et al. "Sailing at the 1980 Moscow Summer Games: Sailing". Olympics at Sports-Reference.com. Sports Reference LLC. Archived from the original on 17 April 2020.
- Hugh Drake & Paul Henderson (2009). Canada's Olympic Sailing Legacy, Paris 1924 – Beijing 2008. Toronto: CYA.
