= Friendship Games =

1984 international multi-sport event

1984 Friendship Games
- Friendship Games logo
- Motto: Sport, Friendship, Peace
- Purpose: For athletes from countries of the "people's democracy" and substitution of the 1984 Summer Olympics (unofficially)

The 1984 Friendship Games, or Friendship-84 (Russian: Дружба-84, Druzhba-84), was an international multi-sport event held between 2 July and 16 September 1984 in the Soviet Union and eight other Eastern Bloc states which boycotted the 1984 Summer Olympics in Los Angeles.

Although Friendship Games officials denied that the Games were a counter-Olympic event to avoid conflicts with the International Olympic Committee, the competition was often dubbed the Soviet Bloc's "alternative Olympics". Some fifty states took part in the competition. While the boycotting countries were represented by their strongest athletes, other states sent their reserve teams, consisting of athletes who failed to qualify for the games in Los Angeles.

== Background ==
Juan Antonio Samaranch (2000 photograph), President of the IOC, held a conference with the Eastern Bloc countries in May 1984, attempting to change their decision on boycotting the Los Angeles Olympics. Instead, the socialist states used this meeting to discuss details of their own multi-sport event, the Friendship Games. Samaranch's only success was Romania's confirmation that it would not join the boycott.

On 8 May 1984, less than three months before the 1984 Summer Olympics were scheduled to begin, the Soviet Union announced its decision to boycott the Games, citing lack of security for Soviet athletes in Los Angeles. The TASS news agency further accused the United States of trying to "exploit the Games for its political purposes" stating that the "arrogant, hegemonic course of the Washington administration in international relations is at odds with the noble ideals of the Olympic movement". In an article published by the London Evening Standard several hours before the official announcement, Victor Louis – a Soviet journalist writing for the Western press and thought to be used by the Kremlin as an unofficial means of leaking information to the West – first informed the world of the USSR's decision to boycott, adding that detailed plans for the "Soviet bloc's alternative games" had already been made. Louis claimed they would "probably be announced at the last minute to throw the American organization into chaos". The article named Bulgaria as the possible host country. On 10 May, Bulgaria became the first Soviet ally to join the boycott, soon followed by East Germany (also 10 May), Mongolia and Vietnam (both 11 May).

Louis wrote another article on 13 May, for the French Le Journal du Dimanche, once again stating that the Soviet Union was contemplating counter-Olympic Games, possibly held in Sofia, the capital of Bulgaria. However, this time he noted that the idea was unlikely, as the Soviets feared that organizing such an event might prompt the International Olympic Committee to exclude the USSR. On the same day, Soviet sports commentator Vsevolod Kuskuskin, during an interview for ABC television program This Week with David Brinkley, said the Eastern Bloc would definitely not organize such games. Also on 13 May, Laos, Czechoslovakia and Afghanistan announced their decision to boycott the Los Angeles games.

On 14 May, Marat Gramov, head of the Soviet Olympic Committee, called a press conference to discuss the boycott. During the conference, Gramov assured "Moscow would not support any alternative games staged to compete with the Olympics". On the same day, Poland stated that, while Eastern Bloc officials had vetoed a counter-Olympics idea, the Bloc would instead "sponsor sports events in various nations as a substitute for participation in the Los Angeles games", holding them at a different time than the Olympics.

Hungary became the ninth country to boycott the 1984 Summer Olympics on 16 May, followed by Poland a day later.

On 20 May, Olaf Brockmann of Austrian newspaper Die Presse, citing Alexander Ushakov, head trainer of the Soviet decathlon team, said Eastern Bloc countries were hastily arranging a series of sports events. Brockmann named five competitions: two track and field athletics meets, one to be held in Prague, Czechoslovakia, and the other in East Berlin and Potsdam, East Germany; plus fencing, modern pentathlon and boxing events to be held in Poland. Ushakov reportedly said the events would be held either before or after the Olympics, to avoid conflicts with the IOC, which would ban any form of counter-Olympic Games.

Juan Antonio Samaranch, President of the IOC, held a conference with National Olympic Committees of eleven Eastern Bloc countries (eight of the boycotting states – Bulgaria, Czechoslovakia, East Germany, Hungary, Mongolia, Poland, the Soviet Union and Vietnam – plus Cuba, North Korea and Romania) in Prague, Czechoslovakia, starting on 21 May. Samaranch hoped to convince the boycotting states to change their position, but while Romania assured him it would attend the 1984 Summer Olympics, the remaining ten countries did not change their stance and even used the meeting to discuss "their own summer games". The official announcement was made by Antonin Himl, president of the Czechoslovak Olympic Committee, who appeared on Prague television on 24 May. Himl said that, after the Olympic Games ended, various Eastern bloc countries would hold their own sport events in Olympic disciplines. Himl stated that the games' intention would be to "give athletes who have conscientiously prepared for the past four years a possibility to sell their abilities". Thus, the Friendship Games idea was officially proclaimed.

Himl said the games would be held after 12 August (i.e. after the Summer Olympics), and that his country, Czechoslovakia, would host gymnastics, archery, women's handball, and women's track and field athletics. He also gave assurances that the events would be open to all athletes, including those from non-boycotting nations.

Soon after the meeting, Cuba also announced its decision to boycott the 1984 Summer Olympics. By the end of June, North Korea, South Yemen, Ethiopia and Angola announced their decisions to boycott.

In June, the Soviet Union officials asked Ted Turner and his Turner Broadcasting System to televise the events held in Hungary for American audiences. Turner eventually declined, but assured that his network would give spot coverage to the Games and treat it as any other sporting event.

== Participating nations ==
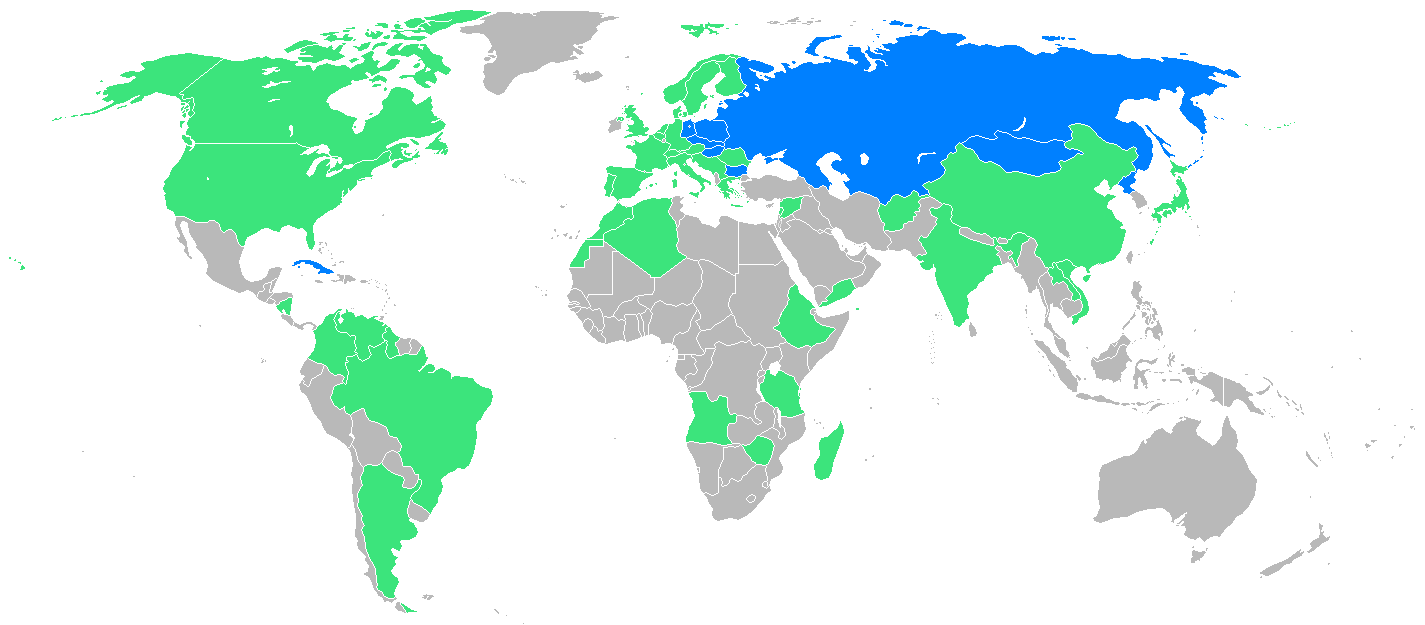
Hosting nations shown in blue, other participants in green, and countries not competing are gray

Initial estimates placed the number of athletes participating in Soviet event venues at approximately 8,000. Later, the number of expected participants was lowered to 2,300, representing 49 countries. However, not all the expected athletes showed up. The exact number of athletes who took part in events held outside of the Soviet Union is unknown.

While Olympic-boycotting countries were represented by their strongest athletes, other states sent their reserve teams, consisting of athletes who failed to qualify for the 1984 Summer Olympics. Some athletes competed at both the Los Angeles Olympics and the Friendship Games, such as Claudia Losch of West Germany, who won the Olympic gold in the shot put, and the United States' Alice Brown, the Olympic 100m silver medallist: neither Losch nor Brown was able to place in the medals at the Friendship Games. In a 2021 interview, long jumper Joyce Oladapo, who competed for Great Britain at the Friendship Games, said that she had initially been under the impression that the event was to be more along the lines of a regular athletics meeting, and only realised its significance when she arrived at the hotel in Prague where athletes were staying: "Literally anyone who was anyone in the Eastern Bloc was there".

- Afghanistan
- Algeria
- Angola
- Argentina
- Austria
- Belgium
- Brazil
- Bulgaria
- Canada
- China
- Colombia
- Cuba
- Czechoslovakia
- Denmark
- East Germany
- Ethiopia
- Finland
- France
- Great Britain
- Greece
- Guyana
- Hungary
- India
- Italy
- Japan
- Laos
- Lebanon
- Madagascar
- Mongolia
- Morocco
- Netherlands
- Nicaragua
- North Korea
- Norway
- Poland
- Portugal
- Romania
- South Yemen
- Soviet Union
- Spain
- Sweden
- Switzerland
- Syria
- Tanzania
- United States
- Venezuela
- Vietnam
- West Germany
- Yugoslavia
- Zimbabwe

== Opening ceremony ==
Although the Games began on 2 July with table tennis events held in North Korea, the official opening ceremony was held on 18 August in Moscow, soon after the first events hosted by the Soviet Union started. The two-hour ceremony held at the Central Lenin Stadium included "girls in white leotards [spinning] red and white beachballs in unison, (...) dozens of children in traditional costumes of the Soviet republics", a "squadron of young performers" which created "a human weaving machine by ducking and turning to mesh their colored banners" and "red-attired teenage girls with silver hula hoops", which spelled the words 'USSR' and 'peace'. The ceremony was described as being "reminiscent of Olympic galas".

As in Olympic opening ceremonies, a torch bearer (Soviet runner and 1980 gold medalist Viktor Markin) carried the flame into the stadium and lit a giant bowl which had been built for the 1980 Moscow Olympics. The torch had been lit from an eternal flame for World War II victims located in the Kremlin.

Teams marched onto the stadium behind flags, but unlike in the Olympics, they were not national teams but sporting organisations, such as Dynamo or Spartak.

Songs performed during the ceremony included a 1918 military march dedicated to the Red Army, "Stadium of My Dreams", written for the 1980 Olympics, and a specially composed song with the chorus "To a sunny peace – yes, yes, yes / To a nuclear blast – no, no, no."

General Secretary Konstantin Chernenko did not attend the ceremony as expected, but five Politburo members were present: Dimitri Ustinov, Mikhail Gorbachev, Grigory Romanov, Vitaly Vorotnikov and Viktor Grishin.

== Summary ==
Events were hosted by nine countries (Bulgaria, Cuba, Czechoslovakia, East Germany, Hungary, North Korea, Mongolia, Poland, and the Soviet Union) between 2 July and 16 September 1984. With the exception of equestrian jumping, no events were held during the Summer Olympics in Los Angeles (held between 28 July and 12 August).

The Games were contested in 22 Olympic disciplines (all except association football and synchronized swimming), and in non-Olympic table tennis, tennis, and sambo wrestling.

=== Archery ===
The Soviet Union won five out of six possible medals.

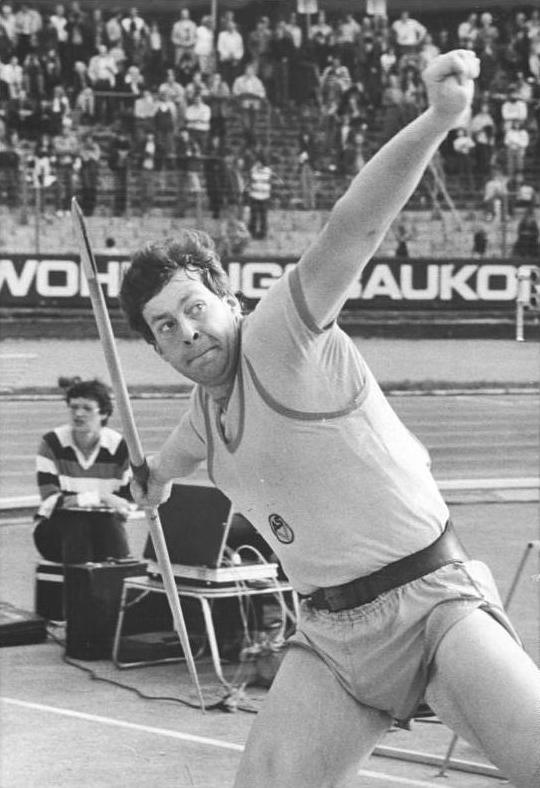
East German Uwe Hohn won the gold medal in javelin throw

=== Athletics ===
In an interview shortly before the events began, the Soviet team's coach Igor Ter-Ovanesyan said his athletes beat more than ten world records during the preparations for the competition. While the Soviet athletes set no new records during the Games, they still dominated, winning more than a half of the gold medals. The only new world record was set by East German Irina Meszynski in women's discus throw, with 73.36 m.

In an unusual feat, Alberto Juantorena (Cuba) and Ryszard Ostrowski (Poland) both crossed the finish line at exactly the same moment in the men's 800-metre run. After the officials were unable to decide who came first – even after examining a photograph – both were declared winners.

The annual Moscow Marathon was declared to be a Friendship Games event in 1984. This caused a minor controversy, as the United States Marine guards of the American embassy, who usually took part in it, withdrew after learning it would be treated as a Friendship Games competition.

=== Basketball ===
The Soviet Union won the men's final against Czechoslovakia 105–70, and Cuba came in third ahead of Poland. The USSR also finished first in the women's event, but since it was a round-robin tournament, there were no semifinals or finals.

=== Boxing ===
The host nation, Cuba, fully dominated the event, winning eleven out of twelve gold medals. East German Torsten Schmitz in the welterweight category was the only non-Cuban to win gold. Teófilo Stevenson, three-time consecutive Olympic gold medalist who lost the chance to win his fourth gold when Cuba boycotted the Los Angeles Games, won the super heavyweight category.

Boxing was one of just three disciplines in which the Soviet Union did not win a gold medal, the others being modern pentathlon and table tennis.

=== Canoeing ===
Hosts East Germany and the Soviet Union won all twelve gold medals, six apiece.

=== Cycling ===
The Schleizer Dreieck in Schleiz, East Germany, usually used as a car or motorcycle race track, served as cycling venue for the individual road race. The event saw participation of top cyclists of the era, including numerous Peace Race veterans such as Uwe Ampler and Uwe Raab.

=== Diving ===
Diving was yet another event dominated by East Germans and Soviets. Gold medalists included Aleksandr Portnov and Brita Baldus.

=== Equestrian ===
Equestrian events were the only discipline contested at the same time as the 1984 Summer Olympics, as jumping events took place between 6 and 10 August. It was also the only discipline in which West German and Italian athletes won medals.

In individual dressage, Yuri Kovshov won both gold and silver, riding two different horses.

=== Fencing ===
Soviet fencers won most of the men's events, while Hungary won both women's events, thanks to Gertrúd Stefanek and Edit Kovács.

=== Field hockey ===
The Soviet Union "A" team won the men's tournament, and while the Soviet Union "B" team came in third, fourth-place finishers Zimbabwe were awarded the bronze medal.

A team representing the Democratic Republic of Afghanistan also competed in the men's event, but lost all its matches, including a 0:27 loss to East Germany.

=== Gymnastics ===
In artistic gymnastics, Olga Mostepanova achieved perfect "10" scores ten times: four in individual competitions, and six in team events. All fifteen medals in rhythmic gymnastics were won by just four athletes: Bulgarians Anelia Ralenkova and Diliana Gueorguieva, and Soviets Galina Beloglazova and Dalia Kutkaitė.

=== Handball ===
East Germany won the men's event, thanks to an 18:17 win over the Soviet Union, while Poland came in third. Péter Kovács of Hungary was the top scorer with 26 goals. The USSR finished first in the women's tournament.

=== Judo ===
The Soviet Union again won most of the gold medals. The event was also particularly successful for Poland, which won seven medals.

=== Modern pentathlon ===
Hungarian László Fábián won the individual competition, and Hungary also won the team event.

=== Rowing ===
The USSR took 11 out of 14 gold medals, while East Germany captured the remaining three.

=== Sailing ===
Sailing took place on the Baltic Sea, near Tallinn, Estonian SSR (where the sailing at the 1980 Summer Olympics also took place), with the exception of 470 and Finn classes, which were contested on Lake Balaton in Hungary. Soviets and East Germans won all of the gold medals. Canada and Finland won their only Friendship Games medals.

=== Shooting ===
While most disciplines mimicked the Olympic Games in terms of events, women's shooting included non-Olympic competitions, namely the 10 metre air pistol and 50 metre rifle three positions events.

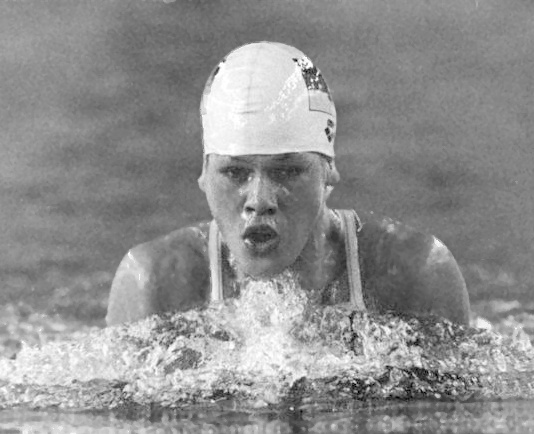
Sylvia Gerasch (1987 photograph), a 15-year-old, set the world record in women's 100 m breaststroke.

=== Swimming ===
Five new world records were set during the competition. Sergei Zabolotnov's result of 1:58.41 in men's 200 metre backstroke excited the crowd, as it was some one and a half seconds better than Rick Carey's result during the Olympics. Fifteen-year-old Sylvia Gerasch of East Germany set the world record in women's 100 m breaststroke and was also part of the relay team that beat the 4 × 100 m medley record.

=== Table tennis ===
Table tennis, a non-Olympic sport at that time, was the only event hosted by North Korea, which won four out of seven gold medals. Notably, the People's Republic of China, which was at odds with most socialist states following the Sino-Soviet split, took part in the event.

=== Tennis ===
Soviet players dominated the singles category, and also won the men's doubles event. The Czechoslovak women's double team was the only non-Soviet team to win gold.

=== Volleyball ===
Not surprisingly, the Soviet team finished first in the men's event, over Cuba and Poland. In the women's tournament, Cuba won the final against the USSR.

=== Water polo ===
The Soviet team – composed mostly of the players who won gold during the 1980 Summer Olympics – finished first, while Hungary and Cuba took the second and third spots.

=== Weightlifting ===
Dominated by Bulgaria and the Soviet Union, the event saw thirty world records broken, including two in the super heavyweight category, set by Anatoly Pisarenko.

=== Wrestling ===
In addition to freestyle and Greco-Roman events, non-Olympic sambo wrestling events were also contested. Sambo was the only event hosted by Mongolia.

== Medal table ==
The following table is based on statistics from the books Na olimpijskim szlaku 1984 and Gwiazdy sportu '84 and does not include sambo results.

Rank	Nation	Gold	Silver	Bronze	Total
1	Soviet Union (URS)	126	87	69	282
2	East Germany (GDR)	50	45	43	138
3	Bulgaria (BUL)	21	25	29	75
4	Cuba (CUB)	15	11	12	38
5	Hungary (HUN)	10	17	24	51
6	Poland (POL)	7	17	34	58
7	North Korea (PRK)	5	5	10	20
8	Czechoslovakia (TCH)	2	18	28	48
9	China (CHN)	2	1	4	7
10	Ethiopia (ETH)	1	2	2	5
11	West Germany (FRG)	1	1	1	3
12	Italy (ITA)	1	1	0	2
13	Japan (JPN)	1	0	0	1
14	Mongolia (MGL)	0	2	5	7
15	Canada (CAN)	0	1	0	1
16	Venezuela (VEN)	0	0	2	2
17	Finland (FIN)	0	0	1	1
17	Sweden (SWE)	0	0	1	1
17	Zimbabwe (ZIM)	0	0	1	1
Totals (19 entries)		242	233	266	741

== Comparisons to the Olympic Games ==
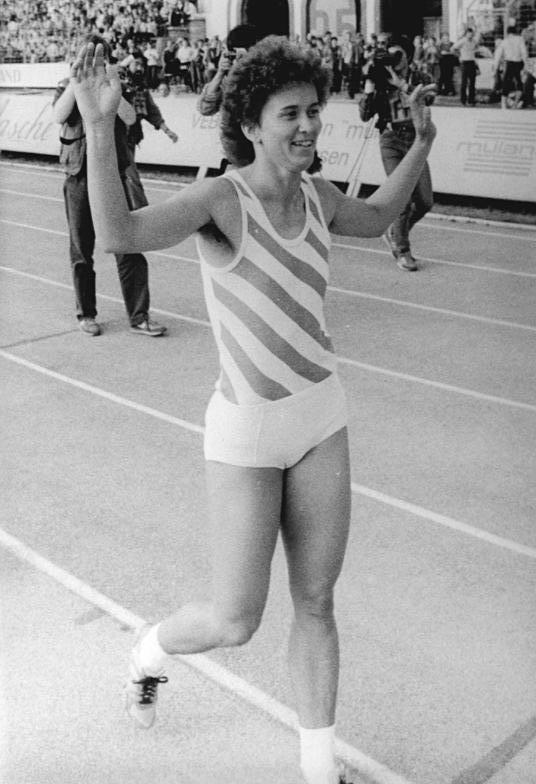
Marlies Göhr won the women's 100 metre event with 10.95, slightly faster than Evelyn Ashford's winning time of 10.97 at the Olympics.

Media on both sides of the Iron Curtain frequently compared the results of 1984 Summer Olympics and the Friendship Games. Over sixty Friendship Games results would have secured medals at the Olympic Games. Eastern Bloc athletes outperformed Olympic winners in 20 of 41 track-and-field events, and eleven of 29 swimming events. Had Li Yuwei, who won the 1984 Olympic gold medal in 50 metre running target shooting, obtained the same score in the Friendship Games, he would have only placed sixth. Indeed, in events such as weightlifting or wrestling, the Friendship Games included almost all of the top athletes of the time. It must also be noted that Eastern bloc countries ran massive state-sponsored doping programs at the time.

However, some journalists noted that such comparisons were unjustified due to differing conditions and equipment. For example, Marlies Göhr's result of 10.95 in women's 100 metre run was slightly better than Evelyn Ashford's winning time of 10.97 at the 1984 Olympics, but when the two met head-to-head a week after the Friendship Games, Ashford was much faster than Göhr and set a new world record. Similarly, Eastern Bloc results in track cycling were better than Olympic results, but Friendship Games cyclists competed on an indoor wooden track, while the Olympic events took place on an outdoor concrete track. "It is like saying Carl Lewis was faster than Jesse Owens, Muhammad Ali would have beaten Joe Louis or Secretariat would have outrun Man o' War", Sam Lacy of The Afro-American concluded.

The comparisons also had political significance. While Friendship Games organizers repeatedly assured the press that their event was not an "alternative Olympics", presumably to avoid punitive IOC measures, Soviet state-run media often alluded to such comparisons. The TASS agency declared that the Eastern Bloc's games were a "major event in the Olympic year", while the Sovietsky Sport newspaper described the Games as the "main event of the Olympic quadrennium". Marat Gramov, head of the Soviet Olympic Committee, said that the "socialist nations remain faithful to the task of strengthening the unity of the Olympics movement", while describing the Los Angeles Games as full of "chauvinism and mass psychosis".

When asked about the Friendship Games, Monique Berlioux, then director of the IOC, said she had "no reaction whatsoever" to the competition.

== Aftermath ==
In 2006, the Law and Justice party in Poland proposed granting Friendship Games medalists sports retirement benefits similar to those given to Olympic medalists. It was signed into law in 2007.

In 2023, facing international sporting isolation in the wake of its invasion of Ukraine, Russia announced plans to revive the Friendship Games and host its second edition in 2024. In May 2023, Russia announced it would be reviving the event as the World Friendship Games, initially planned to take place shortly after the 2024 Summer Olympics but suspended indefinitely as of December 2024.

== Venues ==
Event	Starting date	Ending date	Venue	Location	Country
Archery	23 August	26 August		Plzeň	Czechoslovakia
Athletics; Men's events	17 August	18 August	Grand Arena of the Central Lenin Stadium	Moscow	Soviet Union
Athletics; Women's events	16 August	18 August	Evžen Rošický Stadium	Prague	Czechoslovakia
Basketball	22 August	30 August	CSKA Sports Palace and Dynamo Sports Palace	Moscow	Soviet Union
Boxing	18 August	24 August	Ciudad Deportiva	Havana	Cuba
Canoeing	21 July	22 July		Grünau, East Berlin	East Germany
Cycling; Road events	23 August	26 August	Schleizer Dreieck	Schleiz and Forst	East Germany
Cycling; Track events	18 August	22 August	Velodrome of the Trade Unions Olympic Sports Centre	Moscow	Soviet Union
Diving	16 August	19 August		Budapest	Hungary
Equestrian	6 August	26 August	Książ Landscape Park and the Modern Pentathlon and Equestrian Centre of the Lubusz Sports Club "Lumel"	Drzonków, Sopot and Wałbrzych	Poland
Fencing	15 July	21 July	Budapest Sportcsarnok	Budapest	Hungary
Field hockey Men's event	18 August	26 August	Minor Arena of the Central Dynamo Stadium	Moscow	Soviet Union
Field hockey Women's event	28 August	30 August		Poznań	Poland
Gymnastics; Artistic gymnastics	20 August	26 August		Olomouc	Czechoslovakia
Gymnastics; Rhythmic gymnastics	17 August	19 August	Winter Sports Palace	Sofia	Bulgaria
Handball; Men's event	17 July	21 July		Rostock and Magdeburg	East Germany
Handball; Women's event	21 August	26 August	Hala na Sihoti	Trenčín	Czechoslovakia
Judo	24 August	26 August	Military University of Technology Sports Hall	Warsaw	Poland
Modern pentathlon	5 September	9 September		Warsaw	Poland
Rowing	23 August	25 August	Krylatskoye Rowing Canal	Moscow	Soviet Union
Sailing; 470, Finn classes	20 August	25 August	Lake Balaton	Lake Balaton	Hungary
Sailing; Flying Dutchmen, Soling, Star, Tornado, Windglider classes	19 August	26 August	Pirita Yachting Centre	Tallinn	Soviet Union
Shooting	19 August	25 August	Dynamo Shooting Range	Moscow	Soviet Union
Swimming	19 August	25 August	Swimming Pool at the Olimpiysky Sports Complex	Moscow	Soviet Union
Table tennis	2 July	10 July		Pyongyang	North Korea
Tennis	20 August	26 August	Baildon Katowice courts	Katowice	Poland
Volleyball; Men's event	18 August	26 August	Ciudad Deportiva	Havana	Cuba
Volleyball; Women's event	8 July	15 July		Varna	Bulgaria
Water polo	19 August	26 August	Ciudad Deportiva	Havana	Cuba
Weightlifting	12 September	16 September	Palace of Culture and Sports	Varna	Bulgaria
Wrestling; Freestyle	20 August	22 August	Winter Sports Palace	Sofia	Bulgaria
Wrestling; Greco-Roman	13 July	15 July	Budapest Sportcsarnok	Budapest	Hungary
Wrestling; Sambo	1 September	2 September		Ulaanbaatar	Mongolia

== See also ==
- People's Olympiad – proposed alternative to the 1936 Summer Olympics in Berlin, planned to be held in Spain
- Liberty Bell Classic – track and field athletics event for countries boycotting the 1980 Summer Olympics in Moscow. Held in Philadelphia, United States.
- GANEFO
- Alternate Olympics
- Spartakiad
- Goodwill Games
- Politics and sports
