= László Detre (astronomer) =

Hungarian astronomer

László Detre, born Dunst (19 April 1906, Szombathely – 15 October 1974, Budapest) was a Hungarian astronomer well known for his work on variable stars.

Detre was the director for many years of the Konkoly Observatory in Budapest (assuming the role in 1943), a professor of Budapest University, and editor of the Information Bulletin of Variable Stars of the International Astronomical Union.

Discovered in 1940, asteroid 1538 Detre is named after him.

His two sons were prominent sailors: Szabolcs Detre (father of windsurfer Diána Detre) and Zsolt Detre.
