= Eduardo Penido =

Brazilian sailor

Eduardo Henrique Gomes Penido
Personal information
- Nationality: Brazilian
- Born: January 23, 1960 (age 66)

Sailing career
- Sport: Sailing
- Class: 470 Class

Eduardo Henrique Gomes Penido (born January 23, 1960) is a Brazilian sailor and Olympic champion. He won one gold medal in the 470 Class with Marcos Soares at the 1980 Summer Olympics in Moscow.

Penido is the current chairman of the Rio de Janeiro Sailing Federation (Federação de Vela do Estado do Rio de Janeiro).
