= Jan Willem van den Hondel =

Dutch sailor (born 1957)

Personal information
- Full name: Johannes Willem van den Hondel
- Nationality: Dutch
- Born: 24 July 1957 (age 69) Gouda
- Height: 1.75 m (5.7 ft)

Sailing career
- Sport: Sailing
- Class: 470
- Updated on 2014-01-09

Johannes Willem "Jan Willem" van den Hondel (born 24 July 1957 in Gouda) is a sailor from the Netherlands. Since the Netherlands boycotted the Moscow Olympic Games Van den Hondel represented his National Olympic Committee at the 1980 Summer Olympics, which several countries boycotted, in Tallinn, USSR under the Dutch NOC flag. With Henk van Gent as helmsman, Van den Hondel took the 4th place in the 470.

== Sources ==
- "Jan Willem van den Hondel Bio, Stats, and Results". Olympic Sports. Sports-Reference.com. Archived from the original on 2014-01-09.
- "Zeilers:, We gaan'" (in Dutch). De Telegraaf. 1980-05-16.
- "Zeilploeg bleef buiten de medailles" (in Dutch). De Telegraaf. 1980-07-30.
- "Staartjes: "Het heeft niet meegezeten" Geen medailles voor Nederlandse zeilers" (in Dutch). De waarheid. 1980-07-31.
- "Franse zeilploeg blijft thuis" (in Dutch). Amigoe. 1980-05-22.
- "Games of the XXII Olympiad, Volume I: Moscow, Tallinn, Leningrad, Kiev and Minsk" (PDF). Fizkultura i Sport Publishers. 1981. Archived from the original (PDF) on 2013-10-17.
- "Games of the XXII Olympiad, Volume II: Organisation" (PDF). Fizkultura i Sport Publishers. 1981. Archived from the original (PDF) on 2013-10-17.
- "Games of the XXII Olympiad, Volume III: Participants and Results" (PDF). Fizkultura i Sport Publishers. 1981. Archived from the original (PDF) on October 17, 2013.
