= Ivor Ganahl =

Swiss sailor

Personal information
- Nationality: Swiss
- Born: 25 December 1942
- Died: 11 May 2022 (aged 79)

Sport
- Sport: Sailing

Ivor Ganahl (25 December 1942 – 11 May 2022) was a Swiss sailor. He competed in the Finn event at the 1980 Summer Olympics.
