= Alternate Olympics =

Alternate Olympics, Alternative Olympics, and similar may refer to:

- Interwar left-wing events:
  - International Workers' Olympiads, 1925–37
  - Spartakiad, 1928–37
  - People's Olympiad, planned for Barcelona in 1936
- GANEFO set up by Indonesia in 1963
- As part of the 1980 Olympic boycott:
  - Liberty Bell Classic in track and field athletics
  - USGF International Invitational 1980 in gymnastics
  - International Festivals 1980 (Equestrianism) in dressage, show jumping and military
- Friendship Games, as part of the 1984 Olympic boycott
- Goodwill Games, in protest of both boycotts
- Enhanced Games, a planned event that allows athletes to use performance drugs

== See also ==
- List of multi-sport events
  - Paralympic Games, or Paralympics, for disabled athletes
  - Special Olympics for learning-disabled athletes
  - World Games for non-Olympic sports
  - Deaflympics
  - World Nomad Games
