= Josef Šenkýř =

Czech sailor

Personal information
- Nationality: Czech
- Born: 23 May 1956 Zlín, Czechoslovakia
- Died: 21 July 2000 (aged 44) Poland

Sport
- Sport: Sailing

Josef Šenkýř (23 May 1956 – 21 July 2000) was a Czech sailor. He competed in the Finn event at the 1980 Summer Olympics.
