= Peter Wilson (sailor) =

Zimbabwean sailor (born 1960)

Personal information
- Nationality: Zimbabwean
- Born: 19 March 1960 (age 65)

Sport
- Sport: Sailing

Peter Wilson (born 19 March 1960) is a Zimbabwean sailor. He competed in the Finn event at the 1980 Summer Olympics.
