= Panikos Rimis =

Cypriot sailor (born 1938)

Personal information
- Nationality: Cypriot
- Born: 4 December 1938 (age 87)

Sport
- Sport: Sailing

Panikos Rimis (born 4 December 1938) is a Cypriot sailor. He competed in the Finn event at the 1980 Summer Olympics.
