= Henk van Gent =

Dutch sailor

Personal information
- Full name: Hendrik Maarten van Gent
- Nationality: Dutch
- Born: 10 May 1951 (age 75) Rotterdam
- Height: 1.75 m (5 ft 9 in)

Sailing career
- Sport: Sailing
- Class: 470
- Updated on 2014-01-09

Hendrik Maarten "Henk" van Gent (born 10 May 1951 in Rotterdam) is a sailor from the Netherlands. A physical education teacher by training, he runs a sailing school in Rotterdam.

When the Netherlands boycotted the 1980 Moscow Olympic Games, he represented his National Olympic Committee at the 1980 Summer Olympics in Tallinn, USSR under the Dutch NOC flag. With Jan Willem van den Hondel as crew, he took 4th place in the 470.

== Sources ==
- Evans, Hilary; Gjerde, Arild; Heijmans, Jeroen; Mallon, Bill; et al. "Henk van Gent". Olympics at Sports-Reference.com. Sports Reference LLC. Archived from the original on 9 January 2014.
- "Zeilers:, We gaan'" (in Dutch). De Telegraaf. 16 May 1980.
- "Zeilploeg bleef buiten de medailles" (in Dutch). De Telegraaf. 30 July 1980.
- "Staartjes: "Het heeft niet meegezeten" Geen medailles voor Nederlandse zeilers" (in Dutch). De waarheid. 31 July 1980.
- "Franse zeilploeg blijft thuis" (in Dutch). Amigoe. 22 May 1980.
- "Games of the XXII Olympiad, Volume I: Moscow, Tallinn, Leningrad, Kiev and Minsk" (PDF). Fizkultura i Sport Publishers. 1981. Archived from the original (PDF) on 17 October 2013.
- "Games of the XXII Olympiad, Volume II: Organisation" (PDF). Fizkultura i Sport Publishers. 1981. Archived from the original (PDF) on 17 October 2013.
- "Games of the XXII Olympiad, Volume III: Participants and Results" (PDF). Fizkultura i Sport Publishers. 1981. Archived from the original (PDF) on 17 October 2013.
- "Henk van Gent". www.linkedin.com.
