= István Ruják =

Hungarian sailor

Personal information
- Nationality: Hungarian
- Born: 10 June 1958 (age 66); Budapest, Hungary

Sport
- Sport: Sailing

István Ruják (born 10 June 1958) is a Hungarian sailor. He competed in the Finn event at the 1980 Summer Olympics.
