= Ryszard Skarbiński =

Polish sailor

Personal information
- Nationality: Polish
- Born: 28 February 1949 (age 76); Poznań, Poland

Sport
- Sport: Sailing

Ryszard Skarbiński (born 28 February 1949) is a Polish sailor. He competed in the Finn event at the 1980 Summer Olympics.
