= Trèves (surname) =

Trèves or Trève is a surname, and may refer to:

- Emilio Trèves (1834–1916), Italian writer and publisher
- François Trèves (born 1930), French mathematician
- Raymond Trève (1902–1977), French boxer

== See also ==
- Treves (surname)
