= Abraham ben Solomon Treves =

Abraham ben Solomon Treves (Tzarfati) (Hebrew: אברהם בן שלמה טריויש; c. 1470–1552) was a Jewish scholar of the 16th century. He emigrated from Italy to Turkey, where he officiated as rabbi of German and Portuguese congregations in Adrianople and various other cities. Born in Mantua around 1470, he moved to Salonika in 1495. In 1505 he was appointed rabbi of Ferrara, and in 1522 relocated to Constantinople. He subsequently lived for several years in Adrianople alongside Joseph Caro, during which time he became closely acquainted with Solomon Molcho. Immediately following Molcho's death in 1532, he moved to the Land of Israel, settling in Jerusalem. His major work, Birkat Avraham (Venice, 1552), a treatise on the ritual washing of the hands, was published in the final year of his life. He favored the Sephardic ritual, and corresponded with David Cohen and Elijah Mizrahi. From one of his letters to Joseph Caro it appears that he was a physician also. He was the first scholar to quote the Kol Bo, and was the author of Birkat Abraham, a work on the ritual.
