= Zsolt Detre =

Hungarian sailor (born 1947)

Medal record

Sailing

Representing Hungary

Olympic Games
Bronze medal – third place	1980 Moscow	Flying Dutchman class

Zsolt Detre (born March 7, 1947) is a Hungarian sailor. He won the Olympic Bronze Medal in the 1980 Summer Olympics in the Flying Dutchman class along with his brother Szabolcs Detre.

== Early life ==
His father was László Detre (an astronomer), and his niece is Diána Detre (a windsurfer).
