= Anne-Mari Hyryläinen =

Finnish long-distance runner

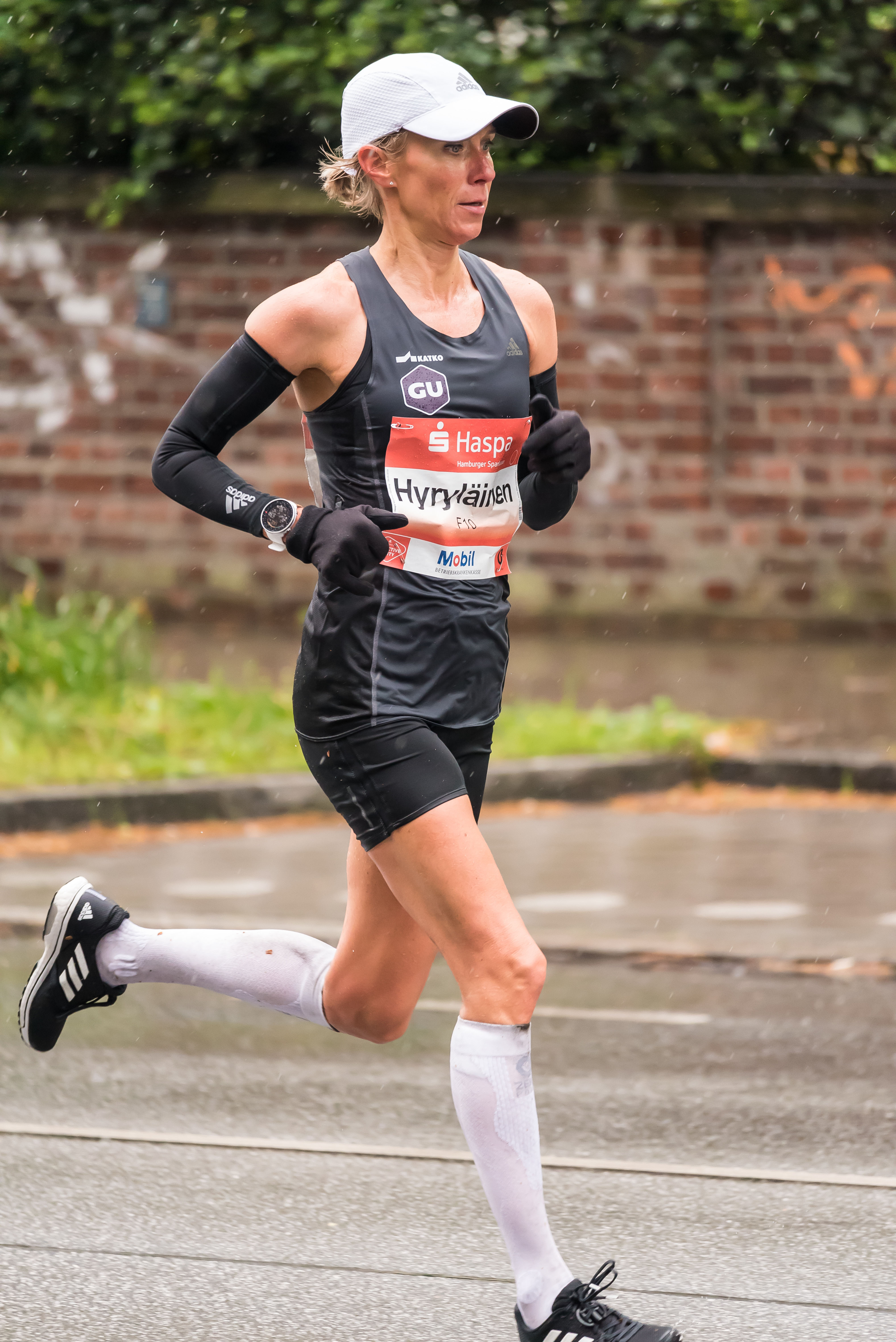

Personal information
- Born: 15 August 1978 (age 47)

Sport
- Country: Finland
- Sport: Athletics
- Event: Marathon

Anne-Mari Hyryläinen née Koskinen (born 15 August 1978) is a Finnish long-distance runner and a mountaineer. She competed in the marathon at the 2015 World Championships, finishing 29th in a time of 2:41:59. She competed in the 2016 Summer Olympics in Rio de Janeiro, Brazil. She also competed in the marathon at the 2017 World Championships, finishing 25th. Her personal best time was set in Dubai in 2018, and is 2:28:53.

Hyryläinen has climbed three of the world's 8,000m peaks: Everest in 2010, Manaslu in 2011 and Lhotse in 2013. She is the second Finnish woman to climb Everest, reaching the summit on 23 May 2010, just six days after her compatriot Carina Räihä.
