= Silvio Necchi =

Italian yacht racer

Silvio Necchi (born 31 July 1954) is an Italian yacht racer who competed in the 1980 Summer Olympics.
