= Szabolcs Detre =

Hungarian sailor (born 1947)

Medal record

Sailing

Representing Hungary

Olympic Games
Bronze medal – third place	1980 Moscow	Flying Dutchman class

Szabolcs Detre (March 7, 1947) is a Hungarian sailor. He won the Olympic Bronze Medal in 1980 Summer Olympics in Flying Dutchman class along with his brother Zsolt Detre.

== Early life ==
His father was László Detre (an astronomer). His daughter is Diána Detre (a windsurfer).
