= György Fundák =

Hungarian sailor

Personal information
- Nationality: Hungarian
- Born: 6 May 1953 (age 73) Budapest, Hungary

Sport
- Sport: Sailing

György Fundák (born 6 May 1953) is a Hungarian sailor. He competed in the 470 event at the 1980 Summer Olympics.
