= Marcos Soares (sailor) =

Brazilian sailor

Personal information
- Born: February 16, 1961 (age 65)

Sailing career
- Sport: Sailing
Medal record
Sailing
Representing Brazil
Olympic Games
Gold medal – first place	1980 Moscow	470 class

Marcos Soares (born February 16, 1961) is a Brazilian sailor and Olympic champion. He won a gold medal in the 470 Class with Eduardo Penido at the 1980 Summer Olympics in Moscow.

== 1980 Olympics ==
The gold medal in the 470 class was quite a surprise. With an additional Brazilian victory in the Tornado class by Alexandre Welter and Lars Björkström, a fourth place in the Finn class, a sixth in the Soling class, and eight in the Flying Dutchman, Brazil was best sailing nation at the 1980 Olympics.
