= Gábor Zalai =

Hungarian sailor

Personal information
- Nationality: Hungarian
- Born: 13 December 1953 (age 72) Cegléd, Hungary

Sport
- Sport: Sailing

Gábor Zalai (born 13 December 1953) is a Hungarian sailor. He competed in the 470 event at the 1980 Summer Olympics.
