= Mihai Butucaru =

Romanian sailor

Personal information
- Nationality: Romanian
- Born: 29 January 1958 (age 67)

Sport
- Sport: Sailing

Mihai Butucaru (born 29 January 1958) is a Romanian sailor. He competed in the Finn event at the 1980 Summer Olympics.
