= Adrian Treves =

American interdisciplinary ecologist and academic

- Born: United States
- Occupations: Ecologist, academic

Academic background
- Education: Rice University; Harvard University

Academic work
- Institutions: University of Wisconsin–Madison

Adrian Treves is an American interdisciplinary ecologist and an academic. He is a professor at the University of Wisconsin-Madison.

Treves is most known for his work on the coexistence between people and large carnivores worldwide, public trust principles, and scientific integrity. His articles have been published in academic journals, including Frontiers in Ecology and the Environment, Conservation Biology and Science. Moreover, he is the recipient of the 2017 Clements Prize for outstanding research & education.

== Education ==
Treves completed his Bachelors of Arts in Biology and Anthropology at Rice University in 1990. In 1997, he earned a PhD in Human Evolutionary Biology from Harvard University.

== Career ==
From 2000 to 2003, Treves worked as a research fellow at the Center for Applied Biodiversity Science at Conservation International. Between 2005 and 2006, he served as a visiting assistant professor for the conservation biology program at Makerere University, Uganda. From 2007 to 2011, he held the position of assistant professor, followed by an appointment as an associate professor from 2011 to 2017 at the Nelson Institute for Environmental Studies at the University of Wisconsin-Madison. Since 2011, he has been serving as a professor in the same institution.

In 2005 Treves founded COEX: Sharing the Land with Wildlife and merged that nonprofit organization into the Wildlife Friendly Enterprise Network, with which he worked until 2009. In 2007, he founded the Carnivore Coexistence Lab and has been its director ever since. Additionally, he fulfilled the role of faculty co-chair for three terms, spanning from 2013 to 2015 and from 2018 to 2020 and 2024, at the University of Wisconsin–Madison Teaching Academy. Furthermore, he acts as an advisor to the Scientific Council on Wolves at the French Ministry of Environment. Since 2022, he has been serving as a board member of Public Employees for Environmental Responsibility.

== Research ==
Treves' research combines aspects of animal behavior, wildlife ecology, conservation biology, environmental policy science, and social sciences. His 2000 study challenged the conventional prediction that individual vigilance declines with increasing group size in animals, particularly primates, by exploring functional differences in vigilance behavior, group safety, and circumstances where group size does not predict individual risk or vigilance. In his collaborative work with several researchers spanning 2003–2015, he explored the tolerance of rural residents in Wisconsin towards wolves, finding that social identity and occupation, particularly among bear hunters and domestic animal owners, significantly influence attitudes, with liberalized wolf-killing policies or compensation payments not being associated with higher tolerance. In 2003, he undertook a joint study with K. Ullas Karanth, also his most often cited article. The article reviewed and examined interactions and changing trends in the scientific management of conflicts between humans and carnivores across the globe. The study explored carnivore conservation, emphasizing the importance of placing equal consideration on biological and social sciences to understand the political factors and scientific management of animals such as tigers and wolves, shifting management goals from fear and economic interests to ecosystem understanding and promoting recolonization of former habitat by imperiled predators, and focusing on nonlethal approaches to mitigate human-carnivore conflicts for long-term persistence.

Treves' team, the Carnivore Coexistence Lab, which has been operational since the year 2007, has focused on two key areas of research. The first is explaining patterns of wolf poaching. In 2017, he corrected traditional methods of estimating poaching risk by pointing out that missing wolves with radio collars that could not be located by radio telemetry can be accounted for more accurately by considering only three categories of cause of death: cryptic poaching, non-human causes, and, rarely, unreported vehicle collisions. Among those three, cryptic poaching likely explains more of the disappearances, resulting in higher estimates of the risk of poaching than previously thought across four populations of U.S. wolves. With colleagues, he went on to measure associations between high rates of wolf poaching and changes in policies that either weaken or strengthen protections for wolves, in addition to changes in partisan politics in several United States. His collaborative work with colleagues since 2020 indicated that reducing protections for endangered species, such as the red wolf in North Carolina, significantly increased the risk and incidence of poaching, challenging traditional wildlife management approaches and highlighting the need for stronger protective policies.

The second area of research was field experiments using randomized, controlled trials to evaluate the effectiveness of non-lethal methods to protect domestic animals from wild predators. Along with collaborators, they completed five such experiments in four countries. In addition, his evaluation of interventions against carnivore predation on farms evaluated the effectiveness of methods like livestock guards and visual deterrents. In 2023, he and Naomi Louchouarn evaluated the effectiveness of low-stress livestock handling (L-SLH) as a non-lethal method to deter various predators in Southwestern Alberta. The study established that when supervised by trained range riders, L-SLH protected cattle and novice range riders could learn the technique in brief periods. The study also outlined a potential correlation, suggesting that grizzly bears tended to avoid herds visited more frequently by range riders practicing L-SLH.

== Awards and honors ==
- 2010 – Award for Best monitoring & evaluation methods, Rainforest Alliance Eco-Index
- 2010 – Fulbright Senior Specialist for teaching (Ecuador)
- 2012 – Fulbright Senior Specialist for teaching (Chile)
- 2017 – Clements Prize for Outstanding Research & Education
- 2021–2023 – Vilas Associate Professorship, University of Wisconsin-Madison

== Selected articles ==
- Naughton-Treves, L., Treves, A., Chapman, C., & Wrangham, R. (1998). Temporal patterns of crop-raiding by primates: linking food availability in croplands and adjacent forest. Journal of Applied Ecology, 35(4), 596–606.
- Treves, A. (2000). Theory and method in studies of vigilance and aggregation. Animal behaviour, 60(6), 711–722.
- Treves, A., & Karanth, K. U. (2003). Human-carnivore conflict and perspectives on carnivore management worldwide. Conservation biology, 17(6), 1491–1499.
- Naughton-Treves, L. I. S. A., Grossberg, R., & Treves, A. (2003). Paying for tolerance: rural citizens' attitudes toward wolf depredation and compensation. Conservation biology, 17(6), 1500–1511.
- Treves, A., Wallace, R. B., Naughton-Treves, L., & Morales, A. (2006). Co-managing human–wildlife conflicts: a review. Human dimensions of wildlife, 11(6), 383–396.
- Treves, A. Bruskotter, J.T. 2014. Tolerance for Predatory Wildlife. Science 344: 476–477.
- Treves A, Paquet PC, Artelle KA, Cornman AM, Krofel M, Darimont CT. 2021. Transparency about values and assertions of fact in natural resource management. Frontiers in Conservation Science: Human-Wildlife Dynamics, 2:e631998.
- F.J. Santiago-Ávila, A. Treves (equal co-authors), W.S. Lynn, Just preservation, trusteeship and multispecies justice. Animal Sentience 393.
- Elbroch L & Treves A. 2023. Why might removing carnivores maintain or increase risks for domestic animals? Biological Conservation 283:110106.
- Treves, A., Fergus, AR, Hermanstorfer, SJ, Louchouarn, NX, Ohrens, O, Pineda Guerrero, AA. 2024. Gold-standard experiments to deter predators from attacking farm animals. Animal Frontiers 14(1) 40–52.
