= Diána Detre =

Hungarian windsurfer (born 1983)

Personal information
- Full name: Diána Klaudia Detre
- Nickname: Dido
- Nationality: Hungary
- Born: 22 November 1983 (age 42) Budapest, Hungary
- Height: 1.69 m (5 ft 7 in)
- Weight: 57 kg (126 lb)

Sailing career
- Sport: Sailing
- Club: Balatonfuredi Yacht Club
- Coached by: Christophe Boutet
- Class: Sailboard

Diána Klaudia Detre (born 22 November 1983 in Budapest) is a Hungarian windsurfer, who specialized in Neil Pryde RS:X class. A two-time Olympian (2008 and 2012), she has been currently training for Balatonfuredi Yacht Club in Balatonfüred under her coach Christophe Boutet. Detre also came from a traditional pedigree of top-class sailors, as her father Szabolcs Detre, along with his twin brother and daughter's uncle Zsolt Detre, captured a bronze medal in the Flying Dutchman at the 1980 Summer Olympics in Moscow. As of September 2013, Detre is ranked no. 79 in the world for the sailboard class by the International Sailing Federation.

Detre made her official debut at the 2008 Summer Olympics in Beijing, where she placed twenty-second in the newly introduced RS:X class with a net score of 185, trailing Cyprus' Gavriella Chatzidamianou by a scant, three-point gap.

At the 2012 Summer Olympics in London, Detre competed for her second Hungarian team in the RS:X class by receiving a berth from the ISAF Sailing World Championships in Perth, Western Australia. Struggling to attain a higher position in ten opening stages, Detre improved her standard with a net score of 150 points to pick up an eighteenth spot in a fleet of twenty-six sailors.
