= Ernesto Treves =

Italian yacht racer

Ernesto Treves (born 23 August 1951) is an Italian yacht racer who competed in the 1980 Summer Olympics.
