= Helsingfors Segelklubb =

Finnish yacht club

- Emblem

- Burgee for motorboats
- Short name: HSK
- Founded: 1899; 126 years ago
- Location: Helsinki
- Website: hoski.fi/in-english/

Helsingfors Segelklubb ry (HSK; lit. 'Helsinki Sailing Club') is a yacht club in Lauttasaari, Helsinki, Finland.

== History ==
The club was established in 1899 under the name Helsingfors Arbetare Segelklubb (Helsinki workers' sailing club) and joined the Finnish Sailing Federation in 1912. Most members were Swedish-speaking Finns. The first harbor was located in the western part of Helsinki. In 1919, after the Independence of Finland, the club was registered with the name Helsingfors Segelklubb.

In 2016, Helsingfors Segelklubb organised the Nordic Folkboat Gold Cup.
