= Andrey Balashov =

Russian sailor (1946–2009)

Medal record

Sailing

Representing the Soviet Union

Olympic Games
Silver medal – second place	1976 Montreal	Finn
Bronze medal – third place	1980 Moscow	Finn

Andrey Vasilyevich Balashov (Russian: Андрей Васильевич Балашов; 22 March 1946 – 21 October 2009) was a Russian sailor. He won a silver medal in the Finn class at the 1976 Summer Olympics and bronze medal in the same class at the 1980 Summer Olympics.
