= Jörn Borowski =

East German sailor

Olympic medal record

Men's sailing

Representing East Germany
Silver medal – second place	1980 Moskva	470

Jörn Borowski (born 15 January 1959, in Rostock) is a German sailor who competed in the 1980 Summer Olympics. He is the son of Olympic medalist Paul Borowski.
