= Egbert Swensson =

East German sailor (born 1956)

Olympic medal record

Men's sailing

Representing East Germany
| Silver medal – second place | 1980 Moscow | 470 |

Egbert Swensson (born 24 May 1956 in Eggesin) is a German sailor who competed in the 1980 Summer Olympics.
