= Georg Tallberg =

Finnish sailor

Georg Bertil Tallberg (born 6 April 1961 in Helsinki) is a Finnish competitive sailor and Olympic medalist. He is married to Anna Slunga-Tallberg.

Tallberg won a bronze medal in the 470 class at the 1980 Summer Olympics in Moscow, along with his partner Jouko Lindgrén.
