= Jouko Lindgren =

Finnish sailor

Jouko Lindgrén (born 15 April 1955 in Helsinki) is a Finnish competitive sailor and Olympic medalist.

He won a bronze medal in the 470 class at the 1980 Summer Olympics in Moscow, along with his partner Georg Tallberg.
