= Fencing at the 1976 Summer Olympics – Men's épée =

Fencing at the Olympics

Men's épée at the Games of the XXI Olympiad
- Fencing pictogram
- Venue: CEPSUM
- Dates: 22–23 July 1976
- Competitors: 64 from 26 nations

Medalists
1st place, gold medalist(s)		Alexander Pusch; West Germany
2nd place, silver medalist(s)		Hans-Jürgen Hehn; West Germany
3rd place, bronze medalist(s)		Győző Kulcsár; Hungary

The men's épée was one of eight fencing events on the fencing at the 1976 Summer Olympics programme. It was the seventeenth appearance of the event. The competition was held from 22 to 23 July 1976. 64 fencers from 26 nations competed. Each nation was limited to 3 fencers. The event came down to a three-way barrage among the medalists, with two West German fencers joining Győző Kulcsár of Hungary (who had previously won gold in 1968 and bronze in 1972) in this tie-breaker fencing session. Alexander Pusch won against both opponents in the barrage to take gold, with Hans-Jürgen Hehn defeating Kulcsár for silver. The medals were the first for West Germany in the men's individual épée. Kulcsár's bronze made him the second man to earn three medals in the event (Edoardo Mangiarotti in 1948–1956, also with a gold and two bronzes, was the first).

== Background ==
This was the 17th appearance of the event, which was not held at the first Games in 1896 (with only foil and sabre events held) but has been held at every Summer Olympics since 1900.

Five of the six finalists (including the three medalists) from the 1972 Games returned: gold medalist Csaba Fenyvesi of Hungary, silver medalist Jacques Ladègaillerie of France, bronze medalist (and 1968 gold medalist) Győző Kulcsár of Hungary, fourth-place finisher Anton Pongratz of Romania, and fifth-place finisher Rolf Edling of Sweden. The previous four years had seen the rise of Sweden and West Germany in the event; Edling had won the 1973 and 1974 World Championships; Alexander Pusch of West Germany was the reigning (1975) World Champion.

Thailand made its debut in the event. The United States appeared for the 16th time, most among nations, having missed only the 1908 edition of the event.

== Competition format ==
The 1976 tournament returned to a mix of pool and knockout rounds similar to that used in 1968, after the 1972 edition briefly used a pool-only format. The competition included three pool rounds, followed by a double-elimination knockout round, finishing with a final pool round. In each pool round, the fencers competed in a round-robin.

Bouts in the round-robin pools were to 5 touches; bouts in the double-elimination round were to 10 touches. Repechages were not used in the first three rounds, but were used to determine medalists if necessary in the final.

- Round 1: 12 pools of 5 or 6 fencers each. The top 3 in each pool (36 total) advanced.
- Round 2: 6 pools of 6 fencers each. The top 4 in each pool (24 total) advanced.
- Round 3: 4 pools of 6 fencers each. The top 4 in each pool (16 total) advanced.
- Elimination rounds: A double-elimination tournament. The 4 fencers who won in both of the first two rounds advanced, as did the 2 fencers who reached the end of the repechage.
- Final round: 1 pool of 6 fencers.

== Schedule ==
All times are Eastern Daylight Time (UTC-4)

Date	Time	Round
Thursday, 22 July 1976	8:30; 11:00; 15:00; 18:00	Round 1 Round 2 Round 3 Elimination rounds
Friday, 23 July 1976	18:00	Final

== Results ==
=== Round 1 ===
==== Round 1 Pool A ====
Pos	Fencer	W	L	TF	TA	Notes	RJ	AP	JP	GT	JDP
1	Ralph Johnson (GBR)	3	1	19	7	Q		5–1	4–5	5–1	5–0
2	Alexander Pusch (FRG)	3	1	16	8	Q	1–5		5–2	5–0	5–1
3	John Pezza (ITA)	3	1	17	13	Q	5–4	2–5		5–2	5–2
4	Geza Tatrallyay (CAN)	1	3	8	16		1–5	0–5	2–5		5–1
5	Juan Daniel Pirán (ARG)	0	4	4	20		0–5	1–5	2–5	1–5	

Source: Official Report, vol. 3, p. 239

==== Round 1 Pool B ====
Pos	Fencer	W	L	TF	TA	Notes	HJ	BL	HJH	DF	GV
1	Hans Jacobson (SWE)	3	1	17	8	Q		2–5	5–1	5–1	5–1
2	Boris Lukomsky (URS)	2	2	18	15	Q	5–2		5–3	4–5	4–5
3	Hans-Jürgen Hehn (FRG)	2	2	14	12	Q	1–5	3–5		5–1	5–1
4	Daniel Feraud (ARG)	2	2	12	19		1–5	5–4	1–5		5.1–5
5	George Varaljay (CAN)	1	3	12	19		1–5	5–4	1–5	5–5.1	

Source: Official Report, vol. 3, p. 239

==== Round 1 Pool C ====
Pos	Fencer	W	L	TF	TA	Notes	TS	IO	NG	TB	AD
1	Thierry Soumagne (BEL)	3	1	17	12	Q		5–2	5–3	5–2	2–5
2	István Osztrics (HUN)	2	2	15	14	Q	2–5		3–5	5–2	5–2
3	Nicola Granieri (ITA)	2	2	16	15	Q	3–5	5–3		3–5	5–2
4	Tim Belson (GBR)	2	2	14	14		2–5	2–5	5–3		5–1
5	Alain Dansereau (CAN)	1	3	10	17		5–2	2–5	2–5	1–5	

Source: Official Report, vol. 3, p. 239

==== Round 1 Pool D ====
Pos	Fencer	W	L	TF	TA	Notes	HL	JJ	GB	JL	VS
1	Herbert Lindner (AUT)	3	1	17	10	Q		5–0	2–5	5–3	5–2
2	Jerzy Janikowski (POL)	3	1	15	16	Q	0–5		5–3	5–4	5–4
3	Greg Benko (AUS)	2	2	18	13	Q	5–2	3–5		5–5	5–1
4	Jacques Ladègaillerie (FRA)	1	3	17	16		3–5	4–5	5–5		5–1
5	Veikko Salminen (FIN)	0	4	8	20		2–5	4–5	1–5	1–5	

Source: Official Report, vol. 3, p. 239

==== Round 1 Pool E ====
Pos	Fencer	W	L	TF	TA	Notes	RB	AP	AA	AB	KR
1	Reinhold Behr (FRG)	2	2	19	14	Q		5–4	5–5	4–5	5–0
2	Anton Pongratz (ROU)	2	2	19	15	Q	4–5		5–5	5–4	5–1
3	Aleksandr Abushakhmetov (URS)	2	2	20	16	Q	5–5	5–5		5–4	5–2
4	Arthur Ribeiro (BRA)	2	2	18	16		5–4	4–5	4–5		5–2
5	Kam Roger (HKG)	0	4	5	20		0–5	1–5	2–5	2–5	

Source: Official Report, vol. 3, p. 239

==== Round 1 Pool F ====
Pos	Fencer	W	L	TF	TA	Notes	AB	CK	GF	SB	JI
1	Aleksandr Bykov (URS)	3	1	16	10	Q		1–5	5–3	5–1	5–1
2	Christian Kauter (SUI)	3	1	17	12	Q	5–1		5–4	2–5	5–2
3	Göran Flodström (SWE)	2	2	17	15	Q	3–5	4–5		5–2	5–3
4	Scotty Bozek (USA)	2	2	13	15		1–5	5–2	2–5		5–3
5	Juan Inostroza (CHI)	0	4	9	20		1–5	2–5	3–5	3–5	

Source: Official Report, vol. 3, p. 239

==== Round 1 Pool G ====
Pos	Fencer	W	L	TF	TA	Notes	FS	OV	RE	MW	EZ
1	François Suchanecki (SUI)	3	1	16	11	Q		1–5	5–4	5–1	5–1
2	Omar Vergara (ARG)	3	1	16	14	Q	5–1		1–5	5–4	5–4
3	Rolf Edling (SWE)	2	2	17	11	Q	4–5	5–1		3–5	5–0
4	Marceli Wiech (POL)	2	2	15	16		1–5	4–5	5–3		5–3
5	Esfandihar Zarnegar (IRI)	0	4	8	20		1–5	4–5	0–5	3–5	

Source: Official Report, vol. 3, p. 239

==== Round 1 Pool H ====
Pos	Fencer	W	L	TF	TA	Notes	TB	NK	SA	GM	SC	MB
1	Teddy Bourne (GBR)	4	1	23	12	Q		3–5	5–0	5–3	5–2	5–2
2	Nils Koppang (NOR)	3	2	22	16	Q	5–3		4–5	3–5	5–1	5–2
3	Sarkis Assatourian (IRI)	3	2	17	20	Q	0–5	5–4		2–5	5–4	5–2
4	George Masin (USA)	2	3	17	20		3–5	5–3	5–2		3–5	1–5
4	Sneh Chousurin (THA)	2	3	17	20		2–5	1–5	4–5	5–3		5–2
6	Marcello Bertinetti (ITA)	1	4	13	21		2–5	2–5	2–5	5–1	2–5	

Source: Official Report, vol. 3, p. 239

==== Round 1 Pool I ====
Pos	Fencer	W	L	TF	TA	Notes	NI	JN	DG	RS	ID	RH
1	Nicolae Iorgu (ROU)	4	1	24	14	Q		4–5	5–3	5–1	5–2	5–3
2	Jeppe Normann (NOR)	4	1	24	17	Q	5–4		5–4	4–5	5–3	5–1
3	Daniel Giger (SUI)	3	2	22	16	Q	3–5	4–5		5–4	5–1	5–1
4	Robert Schiel (LUX)	2	3	19	22		1–5	5–4	4–5		4–5	5–3
5	Iraj Dastgerdi (IRI)	2	3	16	20		2–5	3–5	1–5	5–4		5–1
6	Rubén Hernández (PUR)	0	5	9	25		3–5	1–5	1–5	3–5	1–5	

Source: Official Report, vol. 3, p. 239

==== Round 1 Pool J ====
Pos	Fencer	W	L	TF	TA	Notes	ZM	KHM	OM	DG	SS
1	Zbigniew Matwiejew (POL)	3	1	19	10	Q		5–3	5–2	4–5	5–0
2	Karl-Heinz Müller (AUT)	3	1	18	12	Q	3–5		5–2	5–2	5–3
3	Ole Mørch (NOR)	2	2	14	15	Q	2–5	2–5		5–1	5–4
4	Roger Menghi (LUX)	2	2	13	17		5–4	2–5	1–5		5–3
5	Sutipong Santitevagul (THA)	0	4	10	20		0–5	3–5	4–5	3–5	

Source: Official Report, vol. 3, p. 239

==== Round 1 Pool K ====
Pos	Fencer	W	L	TF	TA	Notes	GK	PB	PZW	BM	TH	DC
1	Győző Kulcsár (HUN)	4	1	21	16	Q		5–2	1–5	5–3	5–2	5–4
2	Philippe Boisse (FRA)	4	1	22	17	Q	2–5		5–4	5–4	5–3	5–1
3	Peter Zobl-Wessely (AUT)	3	2	23	17	Q	5–1	4–5		5–3	4–5	5–3
4	Brooke Makler (USA)	2	3	20	16		3–5	4–5	3–5		5–1	5–0
5	Taweewat Hurapan (THA)	2	3	16	19		2–5	3–5	5–4	1–5		5–0
6	Denis Cunningham (HKG)	0	5	8	25		4–5	1–5	3–5	0–5	0–5	

Source: Official Report, vol. 3, p. 240

==== Round 1 Pool L ====
Pos	Fencer	W	L	TF	TA	Notes	PS	JJ	CF	PR	GP	CM
1	Paul Szabo (ROU)	5	0	25	9	Q		5–3	5–4	5–1	5–1	5–0
2	Jaroslav Jurka (TCH)	3	2	22	17	Q	3–5		4–5	5–4	5–3	5–0
3	Csaba Fenyvesi (HUN)	3	2	21	17	Q	4–5	5–4		2–5	5–1	5–2
4	Philippe Riboud (FRA)	3	2	20	17		1–5	4–5	5–2		5–2	5–3
5	Gilberto Peña (PUR)	1	4	12	22		1–5	3–5	1–5	2–5		5–2
6	Chan Matthew (HKG)	0	5	7	25		0–5	0–5	2–5	3–5	2–5	

Source: Official Report, vol. 3, p. 240

=== Round 2 ===
==== Round 2 Pool A ====
Pos	Fencer	W	L	TF	TA	Notes	CF	PS	AB	KHM	OM	SA
1	Csaba Fenyvesi (HUN)	4	1	25	15	Q		5–2	5–3	5–2	5–5	5–3
2	Paul Szabo (ROU)	4	1	22	16	Q	2–5		5–3	5–4	5–2	5–2
3	Aleksandr Bykov (URS)	3	2	21	17	Q	3–5	3–5		5–3	5–1	5–3
4	Karl-Heinz Müller (AUT)	2	3	19	22	Q	2–5	4–5	3–5		5–3	5–4
5	Ole Mørch (NOR)	1	4	16	22		5–5	2–5	1–5	3–5		5–2
6	Sarkis Assatourian (IRI)	0	5	14	25		3–5	2–5	3–5	4–5	2–5	

Source: Official Report, vol. 3, p. 241

==== Round 2 Pool B ====
Pos	Fencer	W	L	TF	TA	Notes	RE	FS	JJ	NG	TB	HL
1	Rolf Edling (SWE)	4	1	25	9	Q		5–5	5–3	5–1	5–0	5–0
2	François Suchanecki (SUI)	4	1	25	19	Q	5–5		5–3	5–4	5–4	5–3
3	Jaroslav Jurka (TCH)	2	3	20	19	Q	3–5	3–5		5–3	4–5	5–1
4	Nicola Granieri (ITA)	2	3	18	21	Q	1–5	4–5	3–5		5–2	5–4
5	Teddy Bourne (GBR)	2	3	16	21		0–5	4–5	5–4	2–5		5–2
6	Herbert Lindner (AUT)	0	5	10	25		0–5	3–5	1–5	4–5	2–5	

Source: Official Report, vol. 3, p. 241

==== Round 2 Pool C ====
Pos	Fencer	W	L	TF	TA	Notes	AP	NI	IO	NK	GB	TS
1	Alexander Pusch (FRG)	4	1	23	13	Q		3–5	5–2	5–1	5–4	5–1
2	Nicolae Iorgu (ROU)	3	2	21	18	Q	5–3		2–5	5–3	4–5	5–2
3	István Osztrics (HUN)	3	2	18	19	Q	2–5	5–2		1–5	5–4	5–3
4	Nils Koppang (NOR)	2	3	18	17	Q	1–5	3–5	5–1		4–5	5–1
5	Greg Benko (AUS)	2	3	20	23		4–5	5–4	4–5	5–4		2–5
6	Thierry Soumagne (BEL)	1	4	12	22		1–5	2–5	3–5	1–5	5–2	

Source: Official Report, vol. 3, p. 241

==== Round 2 Pool D ====
Pos	Fencer	W	L	TF	TA	Notes	RB	GF	CK	JN	ZM	PZW
1	Reinhold Behr (FRG)	4	1	24	18	Q		5–3	4–5	5–4	5–3	5–3
2	Göran Flodström (SWE)	3	2	23	16	Q	3–5		5–5	5–1	5–4	5–1
3	Christian Kauter (SUI)	3	2	22	17	Q	5–4	5–5		2–5	5–2	5–1
4	Jeppe Normann (NOR)	3	2	20	18	Q	4–5	1–5	5–2		5–4	5–2
5	Zbigniew Matwiejew (POL)	1	4	18	24		3–5	4–5	2–5	4–5		5–4
6	Peter Zobl-Wessely (AUT)	0	5	11	25		3–5	1–5	1–5	2–5	4–5	

Source: Official Report, vol. 3, p. 241

==== Round 2 Pool E ====
Pos	Fencer	W	L	TF	TA	Notes	BL	HJ	GK	JP	DG	AP
1	Boris Lukomsky (URS)	4	1	24	14	Q		5–4	4–5	5–2	5–1	5–2
2	Hans Jacobson (SWE)	3	2	22	17	Q	4–5		3–5	5–1	5–3	5–3
3	Győző Kulcsár (HUN)	3	2	20	21	Q	5–4	5–3		3–5	2–5	5–4
4	John Pezza (ITA)	3	2	18	20	Q	2–5	1–5	5–3		5–4	5–3
5	Daniel Giger (SUI)	2	3	18	17		1–5	3–5	5–2	4–5		5–0
6	Anton Pongratz (ROU)	0	5	12	25		2–5	3–5	4–5	3–5	0–5	

Source: Official Report, vol. 3, p. 241

==== Round 2 Pool F ====
Pos	Fencer	W	L	TF	TA	Notes	HJH	PB	JJ	RJ	AA	OV
1	Hans-Jürgen Hehn (FRG)	4	1	23	16	Q		5–1	3–5	5–4	5–4	5–2
2	Philippe Boisse (FRA)	4	1	21	18	Q	1–5		5–4	5–3	5–4	5–2
3	Jerzy Janikowski (POL)	3	2	23	20	Q	5–3	4–5		4–5	5–4	5–3
4	Ralph Johnson (GBR)	2	3	21	20	Q	4–5	3–5	5–4		4–5	5–1
5	Aleksandr Abushakhmetov (URS)	2	3	22	22		4–5	4–5	4–5	5–4		5–3
6	Omar Vergara (ARG)	0	5	11	25		2–5	2–5	3–5	1–5	3–5	

Source: Official Report, vol. 3, p. 241

=== Round 3 ===
==== Round 3 Pool A ====
Pos	Fencer	W	L	TF	TA	Notes	IO	RB	RE	PB	KHM	JN
1	István Osztrics (HUN)	5	0	25	6	Q		5–1	5–2	5–1	5–1	5–1
2	Reinhold Behr (FRG)	4	1	21	15	Q	1–5		5–4	5–2	5–0	5–4
3	Rolf Edling (SWE)	3	2	21	16	Q	2–5	4–5		5–3	5–1	5–2
4	Philippe Boisse (FRA)	2	3	16	22	Q	1–5	2–5	3–5		5–4	5–3
5	Karl-Heinz Müller (AUT)	1	4	11	20		1–5	0–5	1–5	4–5		5–0
6	Jeppe Normann (NOR)	0	5	10	25		1–5	4–5	2–5	3–5	0–5	

Source: Official Report, vol. 3, p. 243

==== Round 3 Pool B ====
Pos	Fencer	W	L	TF	TA	Notes	NI	GK	AP	GF	FS	NG
1	Nicolae Iorgu (ROU)	4	1	25	10	Q		5–1	5–1	5–5	5–1	5–2
2	Győző Kulcsár (HUN)	3	2	18	15	Q	1–5		5–1	2–5	5–3	5–1
3	Alexander Pusch (FRG)	3	2	17	15	Q	1–5	1–5		5–3	5–1	5–1
4	Göran Flodström (SWE)	2	3	23	18	Q	5–5	5–2	3–5		5–1	5–5
5	François Suchanecki (SUI)	1	4	11	24		1–5	3–5	1–5	1–5		5–4
6	Nicola Granieri (ITA)	0	5	13	25		2–5	1–5	1–5	5–5	4–5	

Source: Official Report, vol. 3, p. 243

==== Round 3 Pool C ====
Pos	Fencer	W	L	TF	TA	Notes	JP	HJ	RJ	JJ	BL	PS
1	John Pezza (ITA)	4	1	25	16	Q		5–5.1	5–4	5–2	5–1	5–4
2	Hans Jacobson (SWE)	4	1	24	17	Q	5.1–5		5–4	4–5	5–1	5–2
3	Ralph Johnson (GBR)	2	3	20	22	Q	4–5	4–5		5.1–5	5–2	2–5
4	Jerzy Janikowski (POL)	2	3	19	23	Q	2–5	5–4	5–5.1		2–5	5–4
5	Boris Lukomsky (URS)	2	3	14	20		1–5	1–5	2–5	5–2		5–3
6	Paul Szabo (ROU)	1	4	18	22		4–5	2–5	5–2	4–5	3–5	

Source: Official Report, vol. 3, p. 243

==== Round 3 Pool D ====
Pos	Fencer	W	L	TF	TA	Notes	CK	HJH	JJ	CF	NK	AB
1	Christian Kauter (SUI)	3	2	22	17	Q		3–5	4–5	5–3	5–1	5–3
2	Hans-Jürgen Hehn (FRG)	3	2	21	18	Q	5–3		5–3	2–5	4–5	5–2
3	Jaroslav Jurka (TCH)	3	2	22	20	Q	5–4	3–5		5–4	5–2	4–5
3	Csaba Fenyvesi (HUN)	3	2	22	20	Q	3–5	5–2	4–5		5–4	5–4
5	Nils Koppang (NOR)	2	3	17	23		1–5	5–4	2–5	4–5		5–4
6	Aleksandr Bykov (URS)	1	4	18	24		3–5	2–5	5–4	4–5	4–5	

Source: Official Report, vol. 3, p. 243

=== Double elimination rounds ===
==== Winners brackets ====
===== Winners group 1 =====
Round of 16		Round of 8
István Osztrics (HUN)	10
Ralph Johnson (GBR)	5	István Osztrics (HUN)	10
John Pezza (ITA)	10	John Pezza (ITA)	6
Hans-Jürgen Hehn (FRG)	6

===== Winners group 2 =====
Round of 16		Round of 8
Alexander Pusch (FRG)	10
Győző Kulcsár (HUN)	5	Alexander Pusch (FRG)	10
Göran Flodström (SWE)	10	Göran Flodström (SWE)	7
Nicolae Iorgu (ROU)	10

===== Winners group 3 =====
Round of 16		Round of 8
Rolf Edling (SWE)	10
Jaroslav Jurka (TCH)	8	Rolf Edling (SWE)	10
Philippe Boisse (FRA)	7	Csaba Fenyvesi (HUN)	1
Csaba Fenyvesi (HUN)	10

===== Winners group 4 =====
Round of 16		Round of 8
Hans Jacobson (SWE)	10
Christian Kauter (SUI)	6	Hans Jacobson (SWE)	7
Jerzy Janikowski (POL)	10	Jerzy Janikowski (POL)	10
Reinhold Behr (FRG)	9

==== Losers brackets ====
===== Losers group 1 =====
Round of 4
Ralph Johnson (GBR)	5
Hans-Jürgen Hehn (FRG)	10
Jaroslav Jurka (TCH)	10
Philippe Boisse (FRA)	10

Round of 4
Hans-Jürgen Hehn (FRG)	10
John Pezza (ITA)	4
Philippe Boisse (FRA)	8
Csaba Fenyvesi (HUN)	10

Round of 2
Hans-Jürgen Hehn (FRG)	10
Csaba Fenyvesi (HUN)	5

===== Losers group 2 =====
Round of 4
Győző Kulcsár (HUN)	10
Nicolae Iorgu (ROU)	8
Christian Kauter (SUI)	6
Reinhold Behr (FRG)	10

Round of 4
Győző Kulcsár (HUN)	10
Hans Jacobson (SWE)	7
Reinhold Behr (FRG)	2
Göran Flodström (SWE)	10

Round of 2
Győző Kulcsár (HUN)	10
Göran Flodström (SWE)	4

=== Final round ===
The final pool was closely fought, with all six fencers at either 3–2 or 2–3. The three men who finished with three wins advanced to a barrage to determine the medals, while the three men who had only two wins in the pool were ranked by pool results. In the barrage, Pusch defeated both Kulcsár and Hehn to win the gold medal, with Hehn prevailing over Kulcsár to take silver.

Pos	Fencer	W	L	TF	TA	Notes	AP	HJH	GK	IO	JJ	RE
1	Alexander Pusch (FRG)	3	2	22	18	B		5–2	3–5	5–2	5–4	4–5
1	Hans-Jürgen Hehn (FRG)	3	2	18	20	B	2–5		5–4	1–5	5–3	5–3
1	Győző Kulcsár (HUN)	3	2	22	19	B	5–3	4–5		3–5	5–3	5–3
4	István Osztrics (HUN)	2	3	18	19		2–5	5–1	5–3		4–5	2–5
5	Jerzy Janikowski (POL)	2	3	20	21		4–5	3–5	3–5	5–4		5–2
6	Rolf Edling (SWE)	2	3	18	21		5–4	3–5	3–5	5–2	2–5	

Source: Official Report, vol. 3, p. 244

Barrage

Pos	Fencer	W	L	TF	TA	AP	HJH	GK
1st place, gold medalist(s)	Alexander Pusch (FRG)	2	0	10	7		5–3	5–4
2nd place, silver medalist(s)	Hans-Jürgen Hehn (FRG)	1	1	9	7	4–5		5–2
3rd place, bronze medalist(s)	Győző Kulcsár (HUN)	0	2	5	10	3–5	2–5	

Source: Official Report, vol. 3, p. 244

== Final classification ==
Rank	Fencer	Nation
1	Alexander Pusch	West Germany
2	Hans-Jürgen Hehn	West Germany
3	Győző Kulcsár	Hungary
4	István Osztrics	Hungary
5	Jerzy Janikowski	Poland
6	Rolf Edling	Sweden
7	Csaba Fenyvesi	Hungary
7	Göran Flodström	Sweden
9	Hans Jacobson	Sweden
9	John Pezza	Italy
9	Reinhold Behr	West Germany
9	Philippe Boisse	France
13	Nicolae Iorgu	Romania
13	Christian Kauter	Switzerland
13	Ralph Johnson	Great Britain
13	Jaroslav Jurka	Czechoslovakia
17	Nils Koppang	Norway
18	Boris Lukomsky	Soviet Union
19	Paul Szabo	Romania
20	Aleksandr Bykov	Soviet Union
21	Karl-Heinz Müller	Austria
22	François Suchanecki	Switzerland
23	Nicola Granieri	Italy
24	Jeppe Normann	Norway
25	Daniel Giger	Switzerland
26	Aleksandr Abushakhmetov	Soviet Union
27	Greg Benko	Australia
28	Teddy Bourne	Great Britain
29	Zbigniew Matwiejew	Poland
30	Ole Mørch	Norway
31	Thierry Soumagne	Belgium
32	Sarkis Assatourian	Iran
33	Anton Pongratz	Romania
34	Peter Zobl-Wessely	Austria
34	Omar Vergara	Argentina
36	Herbert Lindner	Austria
37	Philippe Riboud	France
38	Brooke Makler	United States
39	Arthur Ribeiro	Brazil
40	Tim Belson	Great Britain
41	Marceli Wiech	Poland
42	Scotty Bozek	United States
43	Robert Schiel	Luxembourg
44	George Masin	United States
44	Sneh Chousurin	Thailand
46	Taweewat Hurapan	Thailand
47	Iraj Dastgerdi	Iran
48	Roger Menghi	Luxembourg
49	Daniel Feraud	Argentina
50	Jacques Ladègaillerie	France
51	George Varaljay	Canada
52	Marcello Bertinetti	Italy
53	Alain Dansereau	Canada
54	Gilberto Peña	Puerto Rico
55	Geza Tatrallyay	Canada
56	Sutipong Santitevagul	Thailand
57	Juan Inostroza	Chile
58	Veikko Salminen	Finland
58	Esfandihar Zarnegar	Iran
60	Rubén Hernández	Puerto Rico
61	Denis Cunningham	Hong Kong
62	Chan Matthew	Hong Kong
63	Kam Roger	Hong Kong
64	Juan Daniel Pirán	Argentina
