= Fencing at the 1976 Summer Olympics – Men's team épée =

Men's team épée at the Games of the XXI Olympiad
- Venue: University of Montréal
- Dates: 28 – 29 July 1976
- Competitors: 85 from 19 nations

Medalists
| 1st place, gold medalist(s) | | Carl von Essen; Hans Jacobson; Rolf Edling; Leif Högström; Göran Flodström | Sweden |
| 2nd place, silver medalist(s) | | Hans-Jürgen Hehn; Volker Fischer; Alexander Pusch; Reinhold Behr; Hanns Jana | West Germany |
| 3rd place, bronze medalist(s) | | Daniel Giger; Christian Kauter; Michel Poffet; François Suchanecki; Jean-Blaise Evéquoz | Switzerland |

The men's team épée was one of eight fencing events on the fencing at the 1976 Summer Olympics programme. It was the fifteenth appearance of the event. The competition was held from 28 to 29 July 1976. 85 fencers from 19 nations competed.

== Rosters ==
Argentina

- Daniel Feraud
- Fernando Lupiz
- Juan Daniel Pirán
- Omar Vergara

Austria

- Herbert Lindner
- Karl-Heinz Müller
- Herbert Polzhuber
- Peter Zobl-Wessely

Canada

- Alain Dansereau
- Michel Dessureault
- Geza Tatrallyay
- George Varaljay

Finland

- Heikki Hulkkonen
- Risto Hurme
- Jussi Pelli
- Veikko Salminen

France

- Philippe Boisse
- François Jeanne
- Philippe Riboud
- Jacques La Degaillerie

Great Britain

- Teddy Bourne
- Bill Hoskyns
- Ralph Johnson
- Tim Belson
- Martin Beevers

Hong Kong

- Chan Matthew
- Denis Cunningham
- Kam Roger
- Ng Wing Biu

Hungary

- Csaba Fenyvesi
- Sándor Erdős
- István Osztrics
- Pál Schmitt
- Győző Kulcsár

Iran

- Sarkis Assatourian
- Iraj Dastgerdi
- Ali Asghar Pashapour-Alamdari
- Esfandihar Zarnegar

Italy

- John Pezza
- Nicola Granieri
- Fabio Dal Zotto
- Marcello Bertinetti
- Giovanni Battista Coletti

Norway

- Nils Koppang
- Jeppe Normann
- Kjell Otto Moe
- Bård Vonen
- Ole Mørch

Poland

- Jerzy Janikowski
- Zbigniew Matwiejew
- Leszek Swornowski
- Marceli Wiech

Romania

- Ioan Popa
- Anton Pongratz
- Nicolae Iorgu
- Paul Szabo

Soviet Union

- Aleksandr Abushakhmetov
- Viktor Modzalevsky
- Vasyl Stankovych
- Aleksandr Bykov
- Boris Lukomsky

Sweden

- Carl von Essen
- Hans Jacobson
- Rolf Edling
- Leif Högström
- Göran Flodström

Switzerland

- Daniel Giger
- Christian Kauter
- Michel Poffet
- François Suchanecki
- Jean-Blaise Evéquoz

Thailand

- Sneh Chousurin
- Taweewat Hurapan
- Sutipong Santitevagul
- Royengyot Srivorapongpant
- Samachai Trangjaroenngarm

United States

- Scotty Bozek
- Brooke Makler
- George Masin
- Paul Pesthy

West Germany

- Hans-Jürgen Hehn
- Volker Fischer
- Alexander Pusch
- Reinhold Behr
- Hanns Jana

== Results ==
=== Round 1 ===
==== Round 1 Pool A ====
Great Britain and West Germany each defeated Austria, 11–5 and 10–6, respectively. The two victors then faced off. West Germany won 9–5.

| Pos | Team | W | L | BW | BL | Qual. | FRG | GBR | AUT |
|---|---|---|---|---|---|---|---|---|---|
| 1 | West Germany | 2 | 0 | 19 | 11 | QQ | | 9–5 | 10–6 |
| 2 | Great Britain | 1 | 1 | 16 | 14 | Q16 | 5–9 | | 11–5 |
| 3 | Austria | 0 | 2 | 11 | 21 | | 6–10 | 5–11 | |

Source: Official Report, vol. 3, p. 263

==== Round 1 Pool B ====
The first two rounds of matches left Hungary and France at 2–0 apiece (advancing to the knockout rounds) and Finland and Poland at 0–2 each (eliminating them). Hungary defeated France 8–2 (with one double-loss ensuring that France could not catch Hungary) to take the top spot in the group. Finland and Poland did not face each other.

| Pos | Team | W | L | BW | BL | Qual. | HUN | FRA | FIN | POL |
|---|---|---|---|---|---|---|---|---|---|---|
| 1 | Hungary | 3 | 0 | 30 | 13 | QQ | | 8–2 | 11–5 | 11–4 |
| 2 | France | 2 | 1 | 23 | 12 | Q16 | 2–8 | | 8–0 | 13–1 |
| 3 | Finland | 0 | 2 | 5 | 19 | | 5–11 | 0–8 | | |
| 4 | Poland | 0 | 2 | 5 | 27 | | 4–11 | 1–13 | | |

Source: Official Report, vol. 3, p. 263–64

==== Round 1 Pool C ====
The first two rounds of matches left Sweden and Italy at 2–0 apiece (advancing to the knockout rounds) and Iran and Hong Kong at 0–2 each (eliminating them). Sweden defeated Italy 9–7 to take the top spot in the group.

| Pos | Team | W | L | BW | BL | Qual. | SWE | ITA | IRI | HKG |
|---|---|---|---|---|---|---|---|---|---|---|
| 1 | Sweden | 3 | 0 | 35 | 13 | QQ | | 9–7 | 11–4 | 15–1 |
| 2 | Italy | 2 | 1 | 33 | 15 | Q16 | 7–9 | | 11–5 | 15–1 |
| 3 | Iran | 0 | 2 | 9 | 23 | | 4–11 | 5–11 | | |
| 4 | Hong Kong | 0 | 2 | 2 | 30 | | 1–15 | 1–15 | | |

Source: Official Report, vol. 3, p. 264–65

==== Round 1 Pool D ====
The first two rounds of matches left Switzerland and Norway at 2–0 apiece (advancing to the knockout rounds) and Canada and Argentina at 0–2 each (eliminating them). Switzerland defeated Norway 9–7 to take the top spot in the group. Canada defeated Argentina, 8–8, winning on touches 68–66, to take third.

| Pos | Team | W | L | BW | BL | Qual. | SUI | NOR | CAN | ARG |
|---|---|---|---|---|---|---|---|---|---|---|
| 1 | Switzerland | 3 | 0 | 35 | 9 | QQ | | 9–3 | 13–3 | 13–3 |
| 2 | Norway | 2 | 1 | 31 | 13 | Q16 | 3–9 | | 14–2 | 14–2 |
| 3 | Canada | 1 | 2 | 13 | 35 | | 3–13 | 2–14 | | 8.68–8.66 |
| 4 | Argentina | 0 | 3 | 13 | 35 | | 3–13 | 2–14 | 8.66–8.68 | |

Source: Official Report, vol. 3, p. 265–66

==== Round 1 Pool E ====
The first two rounds of matches left the Soviet Union and Romania at 2–0 apiece (advancing to the knockout rounds) and the United States and Thailand at 0–2 each (eliminating them). The Soviet Union defeated Romania 9–4 to take the top spot in the group. The United States defeated Thailand, also 9–4, to take third.

This was the only group where the second-place team advanced directly to the quarterfinals instead of the round of 16.

| Pos | Team | W | L | BW | BL | Qual. | URS | ROU | USA | THA |
|---|---|---|---|---|---|---|---|---|---|---|
| 1 | Soviet Union | 3 | 0 | 32 | 13 | QQ | | 9–4 | 12–4 | 11–5 |
| 2 | Romania | 2 | 1 | 28 | 17 | QQ | 4–9 | | 10–5 | 14–2 |
| 3 | United States | 1 | 2 | 18 | 27 | | 4–12 | 5–10 | | 9–4 |
| 4 | Thailand | 0 | 3 | 11 | 34 | | 5–11 | 2–14 | 4–9 | |

Source: Official Report, vol. 3, p. 266–67

=== Elimination rounds ===
==== Main bracket ====
First round
B2 | France | 8 (58)
C2 | Italy | 8 (60)
A2 | Great Britain | 5
D2 | Norway | 8

Second round
C2 | Italy | 2
A1 | West Germany | 9
D1 | Switzerland | 9
E2 | Romania | 2
D2 | Norway | 0
B1 | Hungary | 8
C1 | Sweden | 9
E1 | Soviet Union | 4

Semifinals
A1 | West Germany | 8
D1 | Switzerland | 7
B1 | Hungary | 6
C1 | Sweden | 7

Finals
A1 | West Germany | 5
C1 | Sweden | 8
Third place
D1 | Switzerland | 9
B1 | Hungary | 3

==== 5th place consolation bracket ====
Semifinals
D2 | Norway | 4
E1 | Soviet Union | 9
E2 | Romania | 8
C2 | Italy | 2

Finals
E1 | Soviet Union | 9
E2 | Romania | 2
