= Iran at the 1976 Summer Olympics =

- IOC code: IRI (IRN used at these Games)
- NOC: National Olympic Committee of Iran

in Montreal, Canada
- Competitors: 86 in 9 sports
- Flag bearer: Moslem Eskandar-Filabi
- Medals Ranked 33rd: Gold 0 Silver 1 Bronze 1 Total 2

Summer Olympics appearances (overview)
- 1900; 1904–1936; 1948; 1952; 1956; 1960; 1964; 1968; 1972; 1976; 1980–1984; 1988; 1992; 1996; 2000; 2004; 2008; 2012; 2016; 2020; 2024; 2028

Iran competed at the 1976 Summer Olympics in Montreal, Quebec, Canada. 86 competitors, 82 men and 4 women, took part in 50 events in 9 sports. Moslem Eskandar-Filabi was the flagbearer for Iran in the opening ceremony. This would be the last Olympics Iran would take part in until the 1988 Summer Olympics in Seoul, due to the Iranian Revolution in 1979 and the outbreak of the Iran–Iraq War, which lasted from 1980 to 1988.

== Competitors ==
Sport	Men	Women	Total
Aquatics, Water polo	11		11
Athletics	4		4
Boxing	6		6
Cycling, Road	6		6
Cycling, Track	2		2
Fencing	9	4	13
Football	17		17
Shooting	4		4
Weightlifting	7		7
Wrestling	17		17
Total	82	4	86

== Medal summary ==
=== Medal table ===
Sport	Gold	Silver	Bronze	Total
Weightlifting			1	1
Wrestling		1		1
Total	0	1	1	2

=== Medalists ===
Medal	Name	Sport	Event
Silver	Mansour Barzegar	Wrestling	Men's freestyle 74 kg
Bronze	Mohammad Nassiri	Weightlifting	Men's 52 kg

== Results by event ==
=== Aquatics ===
==== Water polo ====
Men

Squad list	Initial round		Final round		Rank
Squad list	Group A	Rank	Group E (7th–12th)	Rank	Rank
Firouz Abdolmohammadian; Jahangir Tavakkoli; Heidar Shonjani; Ahmad Peidayesh; Dariush Movahedi; Bahram Tavakkoli; Reza Kamrani; Manouchehr Parchami; Hossein Nassim; Abdolreza Majdpour; Ahmad Yaghouti; Coach: Mansour Garousi	Italy; L 1–12	4	Mexico; L 3–11	6	12
Firouz Abdolmohammadian; Jahangir Tavakkoli; Heidar Shonjani; Ahmad Peidayesh; Dariush Movahedi; Bahram Tavakkoli; Reza Kamrani; Manouchehr Parchami; Hossein Nassim; Abdolreza Majdpour; Ahmad Yaghouti; Coach: Mansour Garousi	Yugoslavia; L 0–15	4	Australia; L 2–8	6	12
Firouz Abdolmohammadian; Jahangir Tavakkoli; Heidar Shonjani; Ahmad Peidayesh; Dariush Movahedi; Bahram Tavakkoli; Reza Kamrani; Manouchehr Parchami; Hossein Nassim; Abdolreza Majdpour; Ahmad Yaghouti; Coach: Mansour Garousi	Cuba; L 3–12	4	Canada; L 1–8	6	12
Firouz Abdolmohammadian; Jahangir Tavakkoli; Heidar Shonjani; Ahmad Peidayesh; Dariush Movahedi; Bahram Tavakkoli; Reza Kamrani; Manouchehr Parchami; Hossein Nassim; Abdolreza Majdpour; Ahmad Yaghouti; Coach: Mansour Garousi			Cuba; L 2–10	6	12
Firouz Abdolmohammadian; Jahangir Tavakkoli; Heidar Shonjani; Ahmad Peidayesh; Dariush Movahedi; Bahram Tavakkoli; Reza Kamrani; Manouchehr Parchami; Hossein Nassim; Abdolreza Majdpour; Ahmad Yaghouti; Coach: Mansour Garousi			Soviet Union; L 0–16	6	12

=== Athletics ===
Men

Athlete	Event	Round 1			Round 2			Semifinal			Final		Rank
Athlete	Event	Heat	Time	Rank	Heat	Time	Rank	Heat	Time	Rank	Time	Rank	Rank
Ayoub Bodaghi	100 m	3	11.39	7	Did not advance								62
Ayoub Bodaghi	200 m	7	22.47	6	Did not advance								39
Hossein Rabbi	5000 m	2	14:47.12	10							Did not advance		33
Hossein Rabbi	10000 m	3	31:44.27	13							Did not advance		36

Athlete	Event	Qualifying		Final	
Athlete	Event	Result	Rank	Result	Rank
Teymour Ghiasi	High jump	2.10	22	Did not advance	
Salman Hesam	Discus throw	52.40	28	Did not advance	

=== Boxing ===
Men

Athlete	Event	1/32 final	1/16 final	1/8 final	Quarterfinal	Semifinal	Final	Rank
Saeid Bashiri	48 kg		Gedó (HUN); L Knockout	Did not advance				17
Behzad Ghaedi	57 kg	Bye	Sichula (ZAM); W Walkover	Nowakowski (GDR); L RSC	Did not advance			9
Parviz Bahmani	60 kg	Bye	El-Agely (LBA); W Walkover	Tzvetkov (BUL); L 0–5	Did not advance			9
Ali Bahri	67 kg	Bachfeld (GDR); L RSC	Did not advance					33
Mohammad Azarhazin	75 kg		Dorfer (AUT); W 4–1	Kačar (YUG); L 0–5	Did not advance			9
Parviz Badpa	+81 kg		Bye	Hill (BER); L Knockout	Did not advance			9

=== Cycling ===
==== Road ====
Men

Athlete	Event	Time	Rank
Mohammad Ali Mohammadi	Road race	Did not finish	
Hassan Arianfard	Road race	Did not finish	
Mahmoud Delshad	Road race	Did not finish	
Asghar Khodayari	Road race	Did not finish	
Hassan Arianfard; Khosro Haghgosha; Gholam Hossein Kouhi; Asghar Khodayari	Team time trial	2:28:25	24

==== Track ====
Men

Athlete	Event	Elimination		1/8 final	Quarterfinal	Semifinal	Final	Rank
Athlete	Event	Time	Rank	1/8 final	Quarterfinal	Semifinal	Final	Rank
Masoud Mobarakizadeh	1 km time trial						1:14.169	25
Gholam Hossein Kouhi	Individual pursuit	Overlapped		Did not advance				—

=== Fencing ===
Men

Athlete	Event	Round 1		Round 2		Round 3		Elimination	Final	Rank
Athlete	Event	Pools	Rank	Pools	Rank	Pools	Rank	Elimination	Final	Rank
Sarkis Assadourian	Individual épée	Masin (USA); L 2–5	Pool H 3 Q	Mørch (NOR); L 2–5	Pool A 6	Did not advance				32
Sarkis Assadourian	Individual épée	Chousurin (THA); W 5–4	Pool H 3 Q	Szabo (ROU); L 2–5	Pool A 6	Did not advance				32
Sarkis Assadourian	Individual épée	Bertinetti (ITA); W 5–2	Pool H 3 Q	Fenyvesi (HUN); L 3–5	Pool A 6	Did not advance				32
Sarkis Assadourian	Individual épée	Bourne (GBR); L 0–5	Pool H 3 Q	Müller (AUT); L 4–5	Pool A 6	Did not advance				32
Sarkis Assadourian	Individual épée	Koppang (NOR); W 5–4	Pool H 3 Q	Bykov (URS); L 3–5	Pool A 6	Did not advance				32
Iraj Dastgerdi	Individual épée	Hernández (PUR); W 5–1	Pool I 5	Did not advance						49
Iraj Dastgerdi	Individual épée	Normann (NOR); L 3–5	Pool I 5	Did not advance						49
Iraj Dastgerdi	Individual épée	Iorgu (ROU); L 2–5	Pool I 5	Did not advance						49
Iraj Dastgerdi	Individual épée	Giger (SUI); L 1–5	Pool I 5	Did not advance						49
Iraj Dastgerdi	Individual épée	Schiel (LUX); W 5–4	Pool I 5	Did not advance						49
Esfandiar Zarnegar	Individual épée	Vergara (ARG); L 4–5	Pool G 5	Did not advance						58
Esfandiar Zarnegar	Individual épée	Suchanecki (SUI); L 1–5	Pool G 5	Did not advance						58
Esfandiar Zarnegar	Individual épée	Wiech (POL); L 3–5	Pool G 5	Did not advance						58
Esfandiar Zarnegar	Individual épée	Edling (SWE); L 0–5	Pool G 5	Did not advance						58
Ahmad Akbari	Individual foil	Vergara (ARG); W 5–4	Pool H 5	Did not advance						38
Ahmad Akbari	Individual foil	Behr (FRG); W 5–2	Pool H 5	Did not advance						38
Ahmad Akbari	Individual foil	Jurka (TCH); L 3–5	Pool H 5	Did not advance						38
Ahmad Akbari	Individual foil	Ballinger (USA); L 4–5	Pool H 5	Did not advance						38
Ahmad Akbari	Individual foil	Kawatsu (JPN); L 0–5	Pool H 5	Did not advance						38
Hossein Niknam	Individual foil	Jingu (JPN); L 0–5	Pool G 4 Q	Koziejowski (POL); L 1–5	Pool A 6	Did not advance				33
Hossein Niknam	Individual foil	Fekete (CAN); W 5–4	Pool G 4 Q	Kuki (ROU); L 3–5	Pool A 6	Did not advance				33
Hossein Niknam	Individual foil	Wojciechowski (POL); L 1–5	Pool G 4 Q	Jurka (TCH); L 2–5	Pool A 6	Did not advance				33
Hossein Niknam	Individual foil	Romankov (URS); L 0–5	Pool G 4 Q	Noël (FRA); L 3–5	Pool A 6	Did not advance				33
Hossein Niknam	Individual foil	Petruş (ROU); W 5–3	Pool G 4 Q	Stankovich (URS); W 5–4	Pool A 6	Did not advance				33
Ali Asghar Pashapour	Individual foil	Feraud (ARG); W 5–2	Pool I 5	Did not advance						38
Ali Asghar Pashapour	Individual foil	Reichert (FRG); L 0–5	Pool I 5	Did not advance						38
Ali Asghar Pashapour	Individual foil	Koziejowski (POL); W 5–4	Pool I 5	Did not advance						38
Ali Asghar Pashapour	Individual foil	Kuki (ROU); L 3–5	Pool I 5	Did not advance						38
Ali Asghar Pashapour	Individual foil	Jhons (CUB); L 4–5	Pool I 5	Did not advance						38
Ahmad Eskandarpour	Individual sabre	Deanfield (GBR); W 5–4	Pool B 5	Did not advance						37
Ahmad Eskandarpour	Individual sabre	Bierkowski (POL); L 2–5	Pool B 5	Did not advance						37
Ahmad Eskandarpour	Individual sabre	Mikhailov (BUL); L 1–5	Pool B 5	Did not advance						37
Ahmad Eskandarpour	Individual sabre	Apostol (USA); L 3–5	Pool B 5	Did not advance						37
Abdolhamid Fathi	Individual sabre	Bonissent (FRA); L 0–5	Pool A 5	Did not advance						43
Abdolhamid Fathi	Individual sabre	Méndez (ARG); L 4–5	Pool A 5	Did not advance						43
Abdolhamid Fathi	Individual sabre	Nazlymov (URS); L 0–5	Pool A 5	Did not advance						43
Abdolhamid Fathi	Individual sabre	Nowara (POL); L 1–5	Pool A 5	Did not advance						43
Esmaeil Pashapour	Individual sabre	Ortíz (CUB); L 1–5	Pool F 4 Q	Westbrook (USA); L 1–5	Pool D 6	Did not advance				34
Esmaeil Pashapour	Individual sabre	Maffei (ITA); L 2–5	Pool F 4 Q	Marin (ROU); L 3–5	Pool D 6	Did not advance				34
Esmaeil Pashapour	Individual sabre	Brandstätter (AUT); W 5–1	Pool F 4 Q	Méndez (ARG); L 0–5	Pool D 6	Did not advance				34
Esmaeil Pashapour	Individual sabre	Kaplan (USA); L 2–5	Pool F 4 Q	Jabłonowski (POL); L 2–5	Pool D 6	Did not advance				34
Esmaeil Pashapour	Individual sabre			Sidyak (URS); L 0–5	Pool D 6	Did not advance				34

Athlete	Event	Round 1		1/8 final	Quarterfinal	Semifinal	Final	Rank
Athlete	Event	Pools	Rank	1/8 final	Quarterfinal	Semifinal	Final	Rank
Sarkis Assadourian; Iraj Dastgerdi; Ali Asghar Pashapour; Esfandiar Zarnegar	Team épée	Italy; L 5–11	Pool C 3	Did not advance				11
Sarkis Assadourian; Iraj Dastgerdi; Ali Asghar Pashapour; Esfandiar Zarnegar	Team épée	Sweden; L 4–11	Pool C 3	Did not advance				11
Ali Asghar Pashapour; Sarkis Assadourian; Hossein Niknam; Ahmad Akbari	Team foil	United States; L 4–12	Pool D 3		Did not advance			9
Ali Asghar Pashapour; Sarkis Assadourian; Hossein Niknam; Ahmad Akbari	Team foil	Poland; L 3–13	Pool D 3		Did not advance			9
Ali Asghar Pashapour; Sarkis Assadourian; Hossein Niknam; Ahmad Akbari	Team foil	Hong Kong; W 9–7	Pool D 3		Did not advance			9
Abdolhamid Fathi; Ahmad Eskandarpour; Ahmad Akbari; Esmaeil Pashapour	Team sabre	Hungary; L 2–14	Pool D 4		Did not advance			9
Abdolhamid Fathi; Ahmad Eskandarpour; Ahmad Akbari; Esmaeil Pashapour	Team sabre	Poland; L 7–9	Pool D 4		Did not advance			9
Abdolhamid Fathi; Ahmad Eskandarpour; Ahmad Akbari; Esmaeil Pashapour	Team sabre	Argentina; L 4–9	Pool D 4		Did not advance			9

Women

Athlete	Event	Round 1		Round 2		Round 3		Elimination	Final	Rank
Athlete	Event	Pools	Rank	Pools	Rank	Pools	Rank	Elimination	Final	Rank
Jila Almasi	Individual foil	Enríquez (PUR); W 5–4	Pool I 5	Did not advance						37
Jila Almasi	Individual foil	Wrigglesworth (GBR); L 3–5	Pool I 5	Did not advance						37
Jila Almasi	Individual foil	Borghs (BEL); L 3–5	Pool I 5	Did not advance						37
Jila Almasi	Individual foil	Latrille (FRA); L 3–5	Pool I 5	Did not advance						37
Jila Almasi	Individual foil	Staszak (POL); W 5–2	Pool I 5	Did not advance						37
Giti Mohebban	Individual foil	Armstrong (USA); W 5–4	Pool G 6	Did not advance						42
Giti Mohebban	Individual foil	Oka (JPN); L 3–5	Pool G 6	Did not advance						42
Giti Mohebban	Individual foil	Dumont (FRA); L 1–5	Pool G 6	Did not advance						42
Giti Mohebban	Individual foil	Rejtő (HUN); L 0–5	Pool G 6	Did not advance						42
Giti Mohebban	Individual foil	Mangiarotti (ITA); L 0–5	Pool G 6	Did not advance						42
Mahvash Shafaei	Individual foil	Drori (ISR); L 3–5	Pool H 6	Did not advance						45
Mahvash Shafaei	Individual foil	Franke (USA); L 4–5	Pool H 6	Did not advance						45
Mahvash Shafaei	Individual foil	Collino (ITA); L 1–5	Pool H 6	Did not advance						45
Mahvash Shafaei	Individual foil	Halsted (GBR); L 2–5	Pool H 6	Did not advance						45
Mahvash Shafaei	Individual foil	Hanisch (FRG); L 2–5	Pool H 6	Did not advance						45

Athlete	Event	Round 1		Quarterfinal	Semifinal	Final	Rank
Athlete	Event	Pools	Rank	Quarterfinal	Semifinal	Final	Rank
Giti Mohebban; Jila Almasi; Mahvash Shafaei; Maryam Achak	Team foil	Italy; L 3–13	Pool D 4	Did not advance			9
Giti Mohebban; Jila Almasi; Mahvash Shafaei; Maryam Achak	Team foil	Great Britain; L 7–9	Pool D 4	Did not advance			9
Giti Mohebban; Jila Almasi; Mahvash Shafaei; Maryam Achak	Team foil	United States; L 5–11	Pool D 4	Did not advance			9

=== Football ===
Men

Squad list	Eightfinal		Quarterfinal	Semifinal	Final	Rank
Squad list	Group C	Rank	Quarterfinal	Semifinal	Final	Rank
Mansour Rashidi; Hassan Nazari; Andranik Eskandarian; Bijan Zolfagharnasab; Parviz Ghelichkhani; Ebrahim Ghasempour; Ali Parvin; Nasrollah Abdollahi; Nasser Nouraei; Hassan Roshan; Alireza Khorshidi; Hassan Nayebagha; Gholam Hossein Mazloumi; Sahameddin Mirfakhraei; Ghafour Jahani; Alireza Azizi; Nasser Hejazi; Coach: Heshmat Mohajerani	Cuba; W 1–0	2 Q	Soviet Union; L 1–2	Did not advance		5
Mansour Rashidi; Hassan Nazari; Andranik Eskandarian; Bijan Zolfagharnasab; Parviz Ghelichkhani; Ebrahim Ghasempour; Ali Parvin; Nasrollah Abdollahi; Nasser Nouraei; Hassan Roshan; Alireza Khorshidi; Hassan Nayebagha; Gholam Hossein Mazloumi; Sahameddin Mirfakhraei; Ghafour Jahani; Alireza Azizi; Nasser Hejazi; Coach: Heshmat Mohajerani	Poland; L 2–3	2 Q	Soviet Union; L 1–2	Did not advance		5

=== Shooting ===
Open

Athlete	Event	Score	Rank
Mohammad Ali Alijani	Trap	150	41
Houshang Ghazvini	Trap	71, DNF	43
Kamil Jafari	Skeet	170	62
Esfandiar Lari	Skeet	179	54

=== Weightlifting ===
Men

Athlete	Event	Snatch	Clean & jerk	Total	Rank
Mohammad Nassiri	52 kg	100.0	135.0	235.0	3rd place, bronze medalist(s)
Fazlollah Dehkhoda	56 kg	105.0	135.0	240.0	8
Feizollah Nasseri	56 kg	100.0	132.5	232.5	10
Davoud Maleki	60 kg	115.0	145.0	260.0	6
Mehdi Attar-Ashrafi	75 kg	130.0	165.0	295.0	13
Houshang Kargarnejad	110 kg	142.5	180.0	322.5	17
Ali Vali	110 kg	140.0	No mark	—	—

=== Wrestling ===
Men's freestyle

Athlete	Event	Round 1	Round 2	Round 3	Round 4	Round 5	Round 6	Final	Rank
Sobhan Rouhi	48 kg	Frías (MEX); W Fall	Isaev (BUL); L Fall	Ri (PRK); W 14–13	Kim (KOR); L Fall	Did not advance		Did not advance	9
Habib Fattahi	52 kg	Jeon (KOR); L Fall	Bognanni (ITA); W 24–2	Gál (HUN); L Fall	Did not advance			Did not advance	10
Ramezan Kheder	57 kg	Barry (CAN); W 23–5	Anghel (ROU); W 18–15	Jung (KOR); W 24–9	Hatziioannidis (GRE); W 26–8	Dukov (BUL); L 8–12	Brüchert (GDR); L Fall	Did not advance	5
Mohsen Farahvashi	62 kg	Akdağ (TUR); L 6–8	Maekawa (JPN); W 4–4	Beiler (CAN); W 9–5	Bye	Davis (USA); W 18–12	Oidov (MGL); L DSQP	Did not advance	4
Mohammad Reza Navaei	68 kg	Weisenberger (FRG); W 19–7	Keaser (USA); L Fall	Fiszman (ARG); W Fall	Sugawara (JPN); L 1–16	Did not advance			10
Mansour Barzegar	74 kg	Ashuraliev (URS); W 6–6	Pavlov (BUL); W 11–5	Spagnoli (ITA); W DSQP	Övermark (FIN); W DSQP	Hempel (GDR); W 23–8		Dziedzic (USA); W 11–8	2nd place, silver medalist(s)
Mansour Barzegar	74 kg	Ashuraliev (URS); W 6–6	Pavlov (BUL); W 11–5	Spagnoli (ITA); W DSQP	Övermark (FIN); W DSQP	Hempel (GDR); W 23–8		Date (JPN); L Fall	2nd place, silver medalist(s)
Mohammad Hassan Mohebbi	82 kg	Kovács (HUN); L DSQP	Mazur (POL); L 10–13	Did not advance					13
Alireza Soleimani	90 kg	Yatsu (JPN); L Fall	Grangier (FRA); W 21–7	Morgan (CUB); L Fall	Did not advance				12
Reza Soukhtehsaraei	100 kg	Shimizu (JPN); L 6–8	Stratz (FRG); W 10–4	Hellickson (USA); L Fall	Did not advance			Did not advance	9
Moslem Eskandar-Filabi	+100 kg	Bye	Balla (HUN); L DSQP	Adiyaatömör (MGL); W Fall	Șimon (ROU); L DSQP	Did not advance			7

Men's Greco-Roman

Athlete	Event	Round 1	Round 2	Round 3	Round 4	Round 5	Round 6	Round 7 / Final	Rank
Khalil Rashid-Mohammadzadeh	48 kg	Quistelli (ITA); W Fall	Moriwaki (JPN); L Fall	Angelov (BUL); L DSQP	Did not advance			Did not advance	8
Morad Ali Shirani	52 kg	Bye	Rácz (HUN); L 6–9	Hirayama (JPN); W 15–12	Krauß (FRG); L 10–16	Did not advance		Did not advance	6
Gholamreza Ghassab	62 kg	Réczi (HUN); L Fall	Giuffrida (ITA); W 27–14	Miyahara (JPN); L Fall	Did not advance				9
Jafar Alizadeh	68 kg	Mané (SEN); W Fall	Skiöld (SWE); L 8–22	Nalbandyan (URS); L Fall	Did not advance				14
Houshang Montazeralzohour	82 kg	Petković (YUG); L DSQP	Takanishi (JPN); L Fall	Did not advance					13
Hashem Kolahi	90 kg	Andersson (SWE); L 9–25	Bye	Kwieciński (POL); L Fall	Did not advance			Did not advance	9
Bahram Moshtaghi	100 kg	Skrzydlewski (POL); L Fall	Rheingans (USA); L Fall	Did not advance				Did not advance	11
