= Fencing at the 1976 Summer Olympics =

Fencing at the Games of the XXI Olympiad

At the 1976 Summer Olympics in Montreal, eight events in fencing were contested. Men competed in both individual and team events for each of the three weapon types (épée, foil and sabre). Women competed in foil events.

One of the gold medalists from West Germany team was Thomas Bach, who currently serves as President of the International Olympic Committee.

== Medal summary ==
=== Men's events ===
Games	Gold	Silver	Bronze
Individual épée	Alexander Pusch; West Germany	Hans-Jürgen Hehn; West Germany	Gyözö Kulcsar; Hungary
team épée	Sweden; Carl von Essen; Hans Jacobson; Rolf Edling; Leif Högström; Göran Flodström	West Germany; Alexander Pusch; Hans-Jürgen Hehn; Reinhold Behr; Volker Fischer; Hanns Jana	Switzerland; François Suchanecki; Michel Poffet; Daniel Giger; Christian Kauter; Jean-Blaise Evequoz
Individual foil	Fabio dal Zotto; Italy	Aleksander Romankov; Soviet Union	Bernard Talvard; France
team foil	West Germany; Matthias Behr; Thomas Bach; Harald Hein; Klaus Reichert; Erik Sens-Gorius	Italy; Fabio dal Zotto; Carlo Montano; Stefano Simoncelli; Giovanni Battista Coletti; Attilio Calatroni	France; Christian Noël; Bernard Talvard; Didier Flament; Frederic Pietruszka; Daniel Revenu
Individual sabre	Viktor Krovopuskov; Soviet Union	Vladimir Nazlymov; Soviet Union	Viktor Sidyak; Soviet Union
team sabre	Soviet Union; Viktor Krovopuskov; Eduard Vinokurov; Viktor Sidyak; Vladimir Nazlymov; Mikhail Burtsev	Italy; Mario Aldo Montano; Michele Maffei; Angelo Arcidiacono; Tommaso Montano; Mario Tullio Montano	Romania; Daniel Irimiciuc; Ioan Pop; Marin Mustata; Corneliu Marin; Alexandru Nilca

=== Women's events ===
Games	Gold	Silver	Bronze
Individual foil	Ildikó Schwarczenberger; Hungary	Maria Consolata Collino; Italy	Elena Belova; Soviet Union
team foil	Soviet Union; Elena Belova; Olga Knyazeva; Valentina Sidorova; Nailia Gilizova; Valentina Nikonova	France; Brigitte Latrille-Gaudin; Brigitte Gapais-Dumont; Christine Muzio; Veronique Trinquet; Claudette Herbster-Josland	Hungary; Ildikó Schwarczenberger; Edit Kovács; Magda Maros; Ildikó Újlaky-Rejtő; Ildikó Bóbis

== Medal table ==
Rank	Nation	Gold	Silver	Bronze	Total
1	Soviet Union	3	2	2	7
2	West Germany	2	2	0	4
3	Italy	1	3	0	4
4	Hungary	1	0	2	3
5	Sweden	1	0	0	1
6	France	0	1	2	3
7	Romania	0	0	1	1
7	Switzerland	0	0	1	1
Totals (8 entries)		8	8	8	24

== Participating nations ==
A total of 281 fencers (211 men and 70 women) from 34 nations competed at the Montreal Games:

- Argentina (7)
- Australia (3)
- Austria (5)
- Belgium (4)
- Brazil (1)
- Bulgaria (5)
- Canada (13)
- Chile (1)
- Cuba (13)
- Czechoslovakia (3)
- Denmark (1)
- East Germany (1)
- Finland (4)
- France (18)
- Great Britain (18)
- Hong Kong (4)
- Hungary (18)
- Iran (13)
- Israel (1)
- Italy (18)
- Japan (8)
- Kuwait (4)
- Luxembourg (2)
- Norway (5)
- Paraguay (1)
- Poland (18)
- Puerto Rico (4)
- Romania (18)
- Soviet Union (18)
- Sweden (7)
- Switzerland (6)
- Thailand (5)
- United States (18)
- West Germany (16)
