= 1976 Summer Olympics Parade of Nations =

During the parade of nations section of the 1976 Summer Olympics opening ceremony, athletes from each country participating in the Olympics paraded in the arena, preceded by their flag. The flag was borne by a sportsperson from their respective country chosen either by the National Olympic Committee or by the athletes themselves to represent their country.

== Parade order ==
As the nation of the first modern Olympic Games, Greece entered the stadium first; whereas, the host nation Canada marched last, in accordance with the tradition and IOC guidelines. As each delegation entered accompanied by the music to be composed by Vic Vogel, the national name was announced in French and English (the official languages of the Olympics).

Whilst most countries entered under their short names, a few entered under acronyms or alternative names, mostly due to political and naming disputes. West Germany (Federal Republic of Germany) entered as Allemagne (République Federal de Allemagne), East Germany (German Democratic Republic) as République Démocratique Allemande, North Korea (Democratic People's Republic of Korea) as R.P.D. Corée (République Populaire Démocratique de Corée), and Soviet Union (Union of Soviet Socialist Republics) as U.R.S.S. (Union des Républiques Socialistes Soviétiques).

Ninety-two nations entered the stadium with a combined total of 6,084 athletes. Four of them made their Olympic debut, namely Andorra (which had its overall Olympic debut a few months before in Innsbruck), Antigua and Barbuda (as Antigua), Cayman Islands, and Papua New Guinea. Because of the 1976 Summer Olympics boycott, several African countries which marched at the parade eventually withdrew from the Games, including Cameroon, Morocco, and Tunisia. Senegal and Ivory Coast were the only African countries that competed throughout the duration of the Games. Elsewhere, Burma, Iraq and Guyana also opted to join the Congolese-led boycott. Other countries, such as El Salvador and Zaire, did not participate in Montreal for purely economic reasons. Burma should’ve marched between Bermuda and Bolivia, Iraq between Iran and Ireland, El Salvador between Kuwait and Lebanon, and Zaire between Yugoslavia and Canada.

== List ==
The following is a list of each country's announced flag bearer. The list is sorted by the order in which each nation appears in the parade of nations. The names are given in their official designations by the IOC.

This table is sortable by country name (in French), the flag bearer's name, and the flag bearer's sport.

Order	Nation	French	Flag bearer	Sport
1	Greece	Grèce	Vasilios Papageorgopoulos	Athletics
2	Federal Republic of Germany	Allemagne	Hans Günter Winkler	Equestrian
3	Andorra	Andorre	Esteve Dolsa	Shooting
4	Antigua	Antigua	Fred Sowerby	Athletics
5	Netherlands Antilles	Antilles Néerlandaises	Jaime Felipa	Judo
6	Saudi Arabia	Arabie Saoudite	Mohamed Al-Bouhairi	Athletics
7	Argentina	Argentine	Hugo Aberastegui	Rowing
8	Australia	Australie	Raelene Boyle	Athletics
9	Austria	Autriche	Günther Pfaff	Canoeing
10	Bahamas	Bahamas	Mike Sands	Athletics
11	Barbados	Barbade	Lorna Forde	Athletics
12	Belgium	Belgique	Gaston Roelants	Athletics
13	Belize	Belize	John Waight	Shooting
14	Bermuda	Bermudes	Clark Godwin	Athletics
15	Bolivia	Bolivie	Marco Soria	Cycling
16	Brazil	Brésil	João Carlos de Oliveira	Athletics
17	Bulgaria	Bulgarie	Aleksandar Tomov	Wrestling
18	Cameroon^{[c]}	Cameroun	Nicolas Owona	Cycling
19	Cayman Islands	Îles Caïmans	Peter Milburn	Sailing
20	Chile	Chili	Juan Inostroza	Fencing
21	Colombia	Colombie	Helmut Bellingrodt	Shooting
22	Republic of Korea	Corée	Yoo Jae-kwon	Wrestling
23	Costa Rica	Costa Rica	María París	Swimming
24	Ivory Coast	Côte d'Ivoire	Jacques Ayé Abehi	Athletics
25	Cuba	Cuba	Teófilo Stevenson	Boxing
26	Denmark	Danemark	Judith Andersen	Rowing
27	Dominican Republic	République Dominicaine	Eleoncio Mercedes	Boxing
28	Ecuador	Équateur	Nelson Suárez	Diving
29	Spain	Espagne	Enrique Rodríguez	Boxing
30	United States of America	États-Unis de Amerique	Gary Hall, Sr.	Swimming
31	Fiji	Fidji	Miriama Tuisorisori-Chambault	Athletics
32	Finland	Finlande	Lasse Virén	Athletics
33	France	France	Daniel Morelon	Cycling
34	Great Britain	Grande Bretagne	Rodney Pattisson	Sailing
35	Guatemala	Guatémala	Edgar Tornez	Weightlifting
36	Guyana^{[c]}	Guyana	Kenny Bristol	Boxing
37	Haiti	Haiti	Emmanuel Saint-Hilaire	Athletics
38	Honduras	Honduras	Santiago Fonseca	Athletics
39	Hong Kong	Hong Kong	Tso Hok Young	Shooting
40	Hungary	Hongrie	Jenő Kamuti	Fencing
41	India	Inde	Ajitpal Singh	Field hockey
42	Indonesia	Indonésie	Syamsul Anwar Harahap	Boxing
43	Iran	Iran	Moslem Eskandar-Filabi	Wrestling
44	Ireland	Irlande	Frank Moore	Rowing
45	Iceland	Islande	Óskar Jakobsson	Athletics
46	Israel	Israël	Esther Roth-Shahamorov	Athletics
47	Italy	Italie	Klaus Dibiasi	Diving
48	Jamaica	Jamaïque	Don Quarrie	Athletics
49	Japan	Japon	Katsutoshi Nekoda	Volleyball
50	Kuwait	Koweït	Abdul Nasser Al-Sayegh	Fencing
51	Lebanon	Liban	Toni Khouri	Official
52	Liechtenstein	Liechtenstein	Paul Büchel	Judo
53	Luxembourg	Luxembourg	Robert Schiel	Fencing
54	Malaysia	Malaisie	Ishtiaq Mubarak	Athletics
55	Mali^{[c]}	Mali		
56	Morocco^{[c]}	Maroc	Abdel Latif Fatihi	Boxing
57	Mexico	Mexique	Teresa Díaz	Gymnastics
58	Monaco	Monaco	Francis Boisson	Shooting (official)
59	Mongolia	Mongolie	Zevegiin Oidov	Wrestling
60	Nepal	Népal	Baikuntha Manandhar	Athletics
61	Nicaragua	Nicaragua	Frank Richardson	Swimming
62	Norway	Norvège	Leif Jenssen	Weightlifting
63	Papua New Guinea	Papouasie-Nouvelle-Guinée	Wavala Kali	Athletics
64	New Zealand	Nouvelle-Zélande	David Aspin	Wrestling
65	Pakistan	Pakistan	Abdul Rashid	Field hockey
66	Panama	Panamá	Georgina Osorio	Swimming
67	Paraguay	Paraguay	Julio Abreu	Swimming
68	Netherlands	Pays-Bas	André Bolhuis	Field hockey
69	Peru	Pérou	Teresa Núñez	Volleyball
70	Philippines	Philippines	Gerardo Rosario	Swimming
71	Poland	Pologne	Grzegorz Śledziewski	Canoeing
72	Puerto Rico	Porto Rico	Téofilo Colón	Athletics (non-participant)
73	Portugal	Portugal	Carlos Lopes	Athletics
74	German Democratic Republic	République Démocratique Allemande	Hans-Georg Reimann	Athletics
75	Democratic People's Republic of Korea	R.P.D. Corée^{[a]}	Kim Man-dok	Official
76	Romania	Roumanie	Nicolae Martinescu	Wrestling
77	San Marino	Saint-Marin	Italo Casali	Shooting
78	Senegal	Senegal	Samba Dièye	Athletics
79	Singapore	Singapour	Koh Eng Kian	Judo
80	Sweden	Suède	Jan Karlsson	Wrestling
81	Switzerland	Suisse	Christian Kauter	Fencing
82	Suriname	Suriname	Ricardo Elmont	Judo
83	Swaziland^{[c]}	Swaziland	Jonathan Magagula	Boxing
84	Czechoslovakia	Tchécoslovaquie	Ludvík Daněk	Athletics
85	Thailand	Thaïlande	Anat Ratanapol	Athletics
86	Trinidad and Tobago	Trinidad-Tobago	Hasely Crawford	Athletics
87	Tunisia^{[c]}	Tunisie	Mohammed Gammoudi	Athletics
88	Turkey	Turquie	Erol Küçükbakırcı	Cycling
89	Soviet Union	U.R.S.S.^{[b]}	Vasily Alekseyev	Weightlifting
90	Uruguay	Uruguay	Reinaldo Kutscher	Rowing
91	Venezuela	Venezuela	Manuel Luna	Judo
92	Virgin Islands	Îles Vierges	Ivan David	Wrestling
93	Yugoslavia	Yougoslavie	Hrvoje Horvat	Handball
94	Canada	Canada	Abby Hoffman	Athletics

Notes

- ^{a} République Populaire Démocratique de Corée
- ^{b} Union des Républiques Socialistes Soviétiques
- ^{c} Withdrew after the opening ceremony
