= Shooting at the 1976 Summer Olympics =

Shooting at the Games of the XXI Olympiad

Shooting at the 1976 Summer Olympics in Montreal comprised seven events, all mixed. For the first time ever, a woman won an Olympic medal in shooting: Margaret Murdock received silver in the three positions event. Lanny Bassham and Murdock tied for first place, but Murdock was placed second after review of the targets. Bassham suggested that two gold medals be given, and after this request was declined, asked Murdock to share the top step with him at the award ceremony. Women had no separate shooting events at the time and were allowed to compete with men. Murdock became the first woman to win an Olympic medal in shooting.

== Events ==
Event	Gold	Silver	Bronze
pistol	Uwe Potteck (GDR)	Harald Vollmar (GDR)	Rudolf Dollinger (AUT)
rapid fire pistol	Norbert Klaar (GDR)	Jürgen Wiefel (GDR)	Roberto Ferraris (ITA)
rifle prone	Karlheinz Smieszek (FRG)	Ulrich Lind (FRG)	Gennadi Lushchikov (URS)
rifle three positions	Lanny Bassham (USA)	Margaret Murdock (USA)	Werner Seibold (FRG)
running target	Aleksandr Gazov (URS)	Aleksandr Kediarov (URS)	Jerzy Greszkiewicz (POL)
skeet	Josef Panáček (TCH)	Eric Swinkels (NED)	Wiesław Gawlikowski (POL)
trap	Donald Haldeman (USA)	Armando Marques (POR)	Ubaldesco Baldi (ITA)

== Participating nations ==
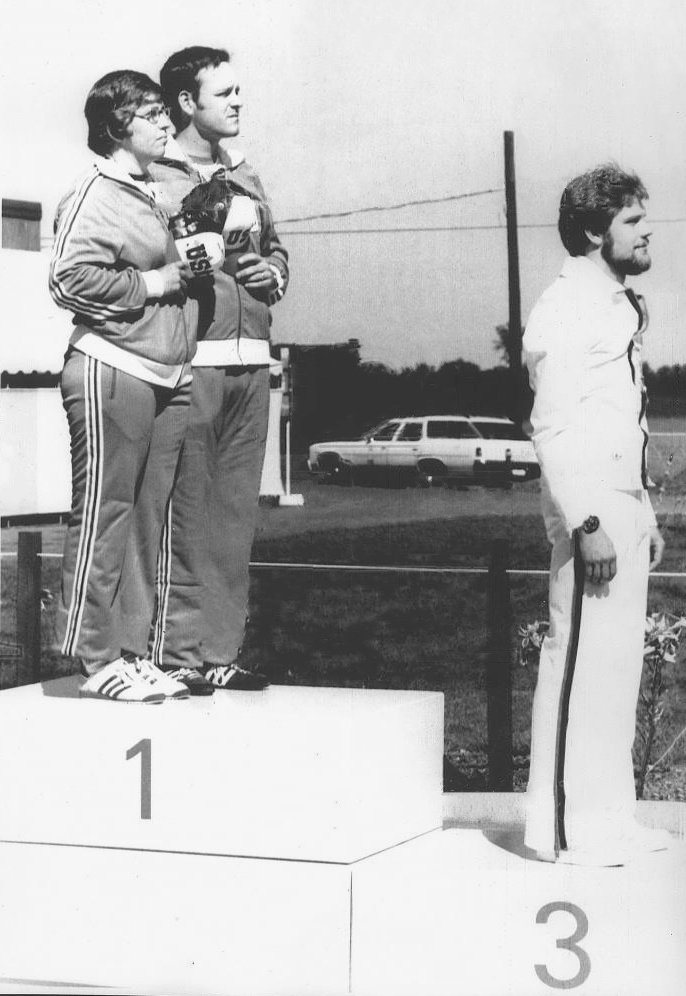
Margaret Murdock, Lanny Basshan, and Werner Seibord

A total of 344 shooters, 336 men and 8 women, from 60 nations competed at the Montreal Games:

- Andorra (2)
- Argentina (6)
- Australia (6)
- Austria (8)
- Belgium (5)
- Belize (2)
- Bolivia (1)
- Brazil (8)
- Bulgaria (7)
- Canada (11)
- Chile (3)
- Colombia (3)
- Costa Rica (1)
- Cuba (4)
- Czechoslovakia (10)

- Denmark (7)
- East Germany (11)
- Finland (4)
- France (10)
- Great Britain (13)
- Greece (4)
- Guatemala (5)
- Hong Kong (6)
- Hungary (7)
- India (3)
- Iran (4)
- Ireland (1)
- Israel (1)
- Italy (13)
- Japan (11)

- Luxembourg (1)
- Malaysia (2)
- Mexico (6)
- Monaco (4)
- Mongolia (4)
- Netherlands (2)
- New Zealand (4)
- North Korea (6)
- Norway (4)
- Papua New Guinea (1)
- Paraguay (1)
- Philippines (2)
- Poland (12)
- Portugal (1)
- Puerto Rico (8)

- Romania (7)
- San Marino (7)
- Singapore (1)
- South Korea (5)
- Soviet Union (13)
- Spain (9)
- Sweden (11)
- Switzerland (5)
- Thailand (12)
- Trinidad and Tobago (1)
- Turkey (3)
- United States (14)
- Virgin Islands (4)
- West Germany (12)
- Yugoslavia (5)

== Medal count ==
Rank	Nation	Gold	Silver	Bronze	Total
1	East Germany	2	2	0	4
2	United States	2	1	0	3
3	Soviet Union	1	1	1	3
3	West Germany	1	1	1	3
5	Czechoslovakia	1	0	0	1
6	Netherlands	0	1	0	1
6	Portugal	0	1	0	1
8	Italy	0	0	2	2
8	Poland	0	0	2	2
10	Austria	0	0	1	1
Totals (10 entries)		7	7	7	21
