= Sweden at the 1976 Summer Olympics =

- IOC code: SWE
- NOC: Swedish Olympic Committee

in Montreal
- Competitors: 116 (99 men and 17 women) in 16 sports
- Flag bearer: Jan Karlsson
- Medals Ranked 12th: Gold 4 Silver 1 Bronze 0 Total 5

Summer Olympics appearances (overview)
- 1896; 1900; 1904; 1908; 1912; 1920; 1924; 1928; 1932; 1936; 1948; 1952; 1956; 1960; 1964; 1968; 1972; 1976; 1980; 1984; 1988; 1992; 1996; 2000; 2004; 2008; 2012; 2016; 2020; 2024

Other related appearances
- 1906 Intercalated Games

Sweden competed at the 1976 Summer Olympics in Montreal, Quebec, Canada. 116 competitors, 99 men and 17 women, took part in 90 events in 16 sports.

== Medalists ==
=== Gold ===
- Anders Gärderud — Athletics, Men's 3000 metre Steeplechase
- Bernt Johansson — Cycling, Men's Individual Road Race
- Hans Jacobson, Carl von Essen, Rolf Edling, Göran Flodström, and Leif Högström — Fencing, Men's Team Épée
- John Albrechtson and Ingvar Hansson — Sailing, Tempest Class

=== Silver ===
- Ulrika Knape — Diving, Women's Platform

== Archery ==
Three of Sweden's archers from the 1972 Summer Olympics returned in 1976. Anna-Lisa Berglund improved her score by 155 points, moving up 23 places in the rankings. Rolf Svensson also competed again, shooting 26 points and 5 places higher than four years before. Defending silver medallist Gunnar Jervill, however, fell to 14th place.

Women's Individual Competition:

- Anna-Lisa Berglund – 2340 points (11th place)
- Lena Sjöholm – 2322 points (13th place)

Men's Individual Competition:

- Rolf Svensson – 2412 points (11th place)
- Gunnar Jervill – 2406 points (14th place)

== Athletics ==
Men's 800 metres

- Ake Svensson

- Heat — 1:48.86 (→ did not advance)

Men's Marathon

- Göran Bengtsson — 2:17:39 (→ 14th place)

Men's High Jump

- Rune Almen

- Qualification — 2.16m
- Final — 2.18m (→ 10th place)

Men's Discus Throw

- Rickard Bruch

- Qualification — 58.06m (→ did not advance)

Men's 20 km Race Walk

- Bengt Simonsen — 1:35:31 (→ 26th place)

== Cycling ==
Six cyclists represented Sweden in 1976.

Individual road race

- Bernt Johansson — 4:46:52 (→ Gold Medal)
- Sven-Åke Nilsson — 4:49:01 (→ 29th place)
- Leif Hansson — did not finish (→ no ranking)
- Alf Segersäll — did not finish (→ no ranking)

Team time trial

- Tord Filipsson
- Bernt Johansson
- Sven-Åke Nilsson
- Tommy Prim

== Fencing ==
Seven fencers, six men and one woman, represented Sweden in 1976.

Men's foil

- Göran Malkar

Men's épée

- Rolf Edling
- Göran Flodström
- Hans Jacobson

Men's team épée

- Carl von Essen, Hans Jacobson, Rolf Edling, Leif Högström, Göran Flodström

Women's foil

- Kerstin Palm

== Modern pentathlon ==
Three male pentathletes represented Sweden in 1976.

Individual

- Hans Lager
- Bengt Lager
- Gunnar Jacobson

Team

- Hans Lager
- Bengt Lager
- Gunnar Jacobson

== Swimming ==
Women's 100 m Freestyle

- Pia Mårtensson

- Heats — 59.15 (→ did not advance)

- Ida Hansson

- Heats — 1:00.22 (→ did not advance)

Women's 200 m Freestyle

- Gunilla Lundberg

- Heats — 2:09.51 (→ did not advance)

- Pia Mårtensson

- Heats — 2:09.85 (→ did not advance)

Women's 100 m backstroke

- Gunilla Lundberg

- Heats — 1:07.73 (→ did not advance)
