= West Germany at the 1976 Summer Olympics =

- Flag of Germany
- IOC code: FRG (GER used at these Games)
- NOC: National Olympic Committee for Germany

in Montreal
- Competitors: 290 (257 men, 33 women) in 20 sports
- Flag bearer: Hans Günter Winkler (equestrian)
- Medals Ranked 4th: Gold 10 Silver 12 Bronze 17 Total 39

Summer Olympics appearances (overview)
- 1968; 1972; 1976; 1980; 1984; 1988

Other related appearances
- Germany (1896–1936, 1952, 1992–pres.); Saar (1952); United Team of Germany (1956–1964)

West Germany (Federal Republic of Germany), the previous host of the 1972 Summer Olympics in Munich, competed at the 1976 Summer Olympics in Montreal, Quebec, Canada. 290 competitors, 233 men and 57 women, took part in 163 events in 20 sports.

== Medalists ==
West Germany finished in fourth position in the final medal rankings, with 10 gold medals and 39 medals overall.

=== Gold ===
- Annegret Richter — Athletics, Women's 100 metres
- Gregor Braun — Cycling, Men's 4000 m Individual Pursuit
- Gregor Braun, Hans Lutz, Günther Schumacher, and Peter Vonhof — Cycling, Men's 4000 m Team Pursuit
- Alwin Schockemöhle — Equestrian, Jumping Individual
- Harry Boldt, Gabriela Grillo, and Reiner Klimke — Equestrian, Dressage Team
- Thomas Bach, Matthias Behr, Harald Hein, Klaus Reichert, and Erik Sens-Gorius — Fencing, Foil Team
- Alexander Pusch — Fencing, Épée Individual
- Karl-Heinz Smieszek — Shooting, Men's Small-bore Rifle prone
- Eckart Diesch and Jörg Diesch — Sailing, Men's Flying Dutchman
- Harro Bode and Frank Hübner — Sailing, Men's 470

=== Silver ===
- Guido Kratschmer — Athletics, Men's Decathlon
- Annegret Richter — Athletics, Women's 200 metres
- Inge Helten, Annegret Kroniger, Elvira Poßekel, and Annegret Richter — Athletics, Women's 4 × 100 m Relay
- Marion Becker — Athletics, Women's Javelin Throw
- Otto Ammermann, Herbert Blöcker, Helmut Rethemeier, and Karl Schultz — Equestrian, Three-Day Event Team
- Alwin Schockemöhle, Paul Schockemöhle, Sönke Sönksen, and Hans-Günter Winkler — Equestrian, Jumping Team
- Harry Boldt — Equestrian, Dressage Individual
- Jürgen Hehn — Fencing, Épée Individual
- Reinhold Behr, Volker Fischer, Jürgen Hehn, Hannes Jana, and Alexander Pusch — Fencing, Épée Team
- Günther Neureuther — Judo, Men's Heavyweight
- Peter-Michael Kolbe — Rowing, Men's Single Sculls
- Ulrich Lind — Shooting, Men's Small-bore Rifle prone

=== Bronze ===
- Paul-Heinz Wellmann — Athletics, Men's 1500 metres
- Klaus-Peter Hildenbrand — Athletics, Men's 5000 metres
- Bernd Herrmann, Franz-Peter Hofmeister, Lothar Krieg, and Harald Schmid — Athletics, Men's 4 × 400 m Relay
- Inge Helten — Athletics, Women's 100 metres
- Reinhard Skricek — Boxing, Men's Welterweight
- Karl Schultz — Equestrian, Three-Day Event Individual
- Reiner Klimke — Equestrian, Dressage Individual
- Eberhard Gienger — Gymnastics, Men's Horizontal Bar
- Thomas Strauß and Peter van Roye — Rowing, Men's Coxless Pairs
- Hans-Johann Färber, Siegfried Fricke, Ralph Kubail, Peter Niehusen, and Hartmut Wenzel — Rowing, Men's Coxed Fours
- Edith Eckbauer-Baumann and Thea Einöder-Straube — Rowing, Women's Coxless Pairs
- Werner Seibold — Shooting, Men's Small-bore Rifle Three Positions
- Peter Nocke — Swimming, Men's 100 m Freestyle
- Michael Kraus, Walter Kusch, Peter Nocke, and Klaus Steinbach — Swimming, Men's 4 × 100 m Medley Relay
- Karl-Heinz Helbing — Wrestling, Men's Greco-Roman Welterweight
- Adolf Seger — Wrestling, Men's Freestyle Middleweight
- Jörg Schmall and Jörg Spengler — Sailing, Men's Tornado

== Archery ==
In their second Olympics competing in archery, West Germany captured seventh place on the national leaderboard with a 6th place in the men's competition and an 8th place in the women's. In addition to those two competitors, West Germany also sent one other competitor in the men's division.

Women's Individual Competition:

- Maria Urban – 2376 points (→ 8th place)

Men's Individual Competition:

- Willi Gabriel – 2435 points (→ 6th place)
- Rudolf Schiff – 2326 points (→ 27th place)

== Athletics ==
Men's 800 metres

- Willi Wulbeck

- Heat — 1:48.47
- Semi Final — 1:47.18
- Final — 1:45.26 (→ 4th place)

- Thomas Wessinghage

- Heat — 1:46.56
- Semi Final — 1:48.18 (→ did not advance)

Men's 4 × 100 m Relay

- Klaus Ehl, Klaus-Dieter Bieler, Dieter Steinmann, and Reinhard Borchert

- Heat — 39.63
- Semi Final — 39.58 (→ did not advance)

Men's 4 × 400 m Relay

- Franz-Peter Hofmeister, Lothar Krieg, Harald Schmid, and Bernd Herrmann

- Heat — 3:03.24
- Final — 3:01.98 (→ Bronze Medal)

Men's 400 m Hurdles

- Harald Schmid

- Heats — 50.57 s
- Semi Finals — DSQ (→ did not advance)

Men's Marathon

- Günther Mielke — 2:35:44 (→ 54th place)

Men's Long Jump

- Hans Baumgartner

- Qualification — 7.81 m (→ did not advance)
- Final — 7.84 m (→ 8th place)

- Hans-Jürgen Berger

- Qualification — 7.70 m (→ did not advance)

Men's High Jump

- Walter Boller

- Qualification — 2.13 m (→ did not advance)

- Wolfgang Killing

- Qualification — 2.05 m (→ did not advance)

Men's Discus Throw

- Hein-Direck Neu

- Qualification — 61.88 m
- Final — 60.46 m (→ 12th place)

Men's 20 km Race Walk

- Gerhard Weidner — 1:32:56 (→ 18th place)
- Bernd Kannenberg — did not finish (→ no ranking)

Women's Shot Put

- Eva Wilms

- Final — 19.29 m (→ 7th place)

== Boxing ==
Men's Flyweight (– 51 kg)

- Joachim Schür
  1. First Round — Bye
  2. Second Round — Lost to Jong Jo-Ung (PRK), RSC-2

== Cycling ==
Twelve cyclists represented West Germany in 1976.

Individual road race

- Klaus-Peter Thaler — 4:47:23 (→ 9th place)
- Wilfried Trott — 4:49:01 (→ 19th place)
- Hans-Peter Jakst — 4:49:01 (→ 37th place)
- Peter Weibel — 4:45:49 (→ 46th place)

Team time trial

- Hans-Peter Jakst
- Olaf Paltian
- Friedrich von Löffelholz
- Peter Weibel

Sprint

- Dieter Berkmann — 4th place

1000 m time trial

- Hans Michalsky — 1:07.878 (→ 6th place)

Individual pursuit

- Gregor Braun — Gold Medal

Team pursuit

- Gregor Braun
- Hans Lutz
- Günther Schumacher
- Peter Vonhof

== Fencing ==
16 fencers, 11 men and 5 women, represented West Germany in 1976.

Men's foil

- Harald Hein
- Matthias Behr
- Klaus Reichert

Men's team foil

- Thomas Bach, Harald Hein, Klaus Reichert, Matthias Behr, Erk Sens-Gorius

Men's épée

- Alexander Pusch
- Hans-Jürgen Hehn
- Reinhold Behr

Men's team épée

- Hans-Jürgen Hehn, Volker Fischer, Alexander Pusch, Reinhold Behr, Hanns Jana

Men's sabre

- Tycho Weißgerber

Women's foil

- Cornelia Hanisch
- Brigitte Oertel
- Ute Kircheis-Wessel

Women's team foil

- Karin Rutz-Gießelmann, Cornelia Hanisch, Ute Kircheis-Wessel, Brigitte Oertel, Jutta Höhne

== Hockey ==
Men's team competition

- Preliminary round (group B)

- Tied with New Zealand (1-1)
- Lost to Pakistan (2-4)
- Lost to Spain (1-4)
- Defeated Belgium (6-1)

- Classification Matches

- 5th/8th place: Defeated India (3-2)
- 5th/6th place: Defeated Spain (9-1) → Fifth place

- Team roster

- ( 1.) Wolfgang Rott
- ( 2.) Klaus Ludwiczak
- ( 3.) Michael Peter
- ( 4.) Dieter Freise
- ( 5.) Fritz Schmidt
- ( 6.) Michael Krause
- ( 7.) Horst Dröse
- ( 8.) Werner Kaessmann
- ( 9.) Uli Vos
- (10.) Peter Caninenberg
- (11.) Peter Trump
- (12.) Hans Montag
- (13.) Wolfgang Strödter
- (14.) Heiner Dopp
- (15.) Rainer Seifert
- (16.) Ralf Lauruschkat

- Head coach: Klaus Kleiter

== Modern pentathlon ==
Three male pentathletes represented West Germany in 1976.

Individual

- Walter Esser
- Gerhard Werner
- Wolfgang Köpcke

Team

- Walter Esser
- Gerhard Werner
- Wolfgang Köpcke

== Water polo ==
Men's team competition

- Team roster

- Günter Kilian
- Günter Wolf
- Hans-Georg Simon
- Horst Kilian
- Jürgen Stiefel
- Ludger Weeke
- Martin Jellinghaus
- Peter Röhle
- Roland Freund
- Werner Obschernikat
- Wolfgang Mechler
