= 1973 World Fencing Championships =

International fencing competition

1973 World Championships in Fencing
- Host city: Gothenburg, Sweden

The 1973 World Fencing Championships were held in Gothenburg, Sweden.

== Medal table ==
* Host nation (Sweden)

Rank	Nation	Gold	Silver	Bronze	Total
1	Soviet Union (URS)	2	4	2	8
2	Hungary (HUN)	2	2	2	6
3	Sweden (SWE)*	1	1	0	2
3	West Germany (FRG)	1	1	0	2
5	Italy (ITA)	1	0	2	3
6	France (FRA)	1	0	0	1
7	Poland (POL)	0	0	1	1
7	Romania (ROU)	0	0	1	1
Totals (8 entries)		8	8	8	24

== Medal summary ==
=== Men's events ===
Event	Gold	Silver	Bronze
Individual Foil	(France) Christian Noël	(Soviet Union) Yuri Shish	(Hungarian People's Republic) Jenő Kamuti
Team Foil	Soviet Union	West Germany	(Polish People's Republic) Poland
Individual Sabre	(Italy) Mario Aldo Montano	(Soviet Union) Viktor Sidyak	(Soviet Union) Vladimir Nazlymov
Team Sabre	(Hungarian People's Republic) Hungary	Soviet Union	Italy
Individual Épée	(Sweden) Rolf Edling	(Sweden) Hans Jacobson	(Italy) John Pezza
Team Épée	West Germany	(Hungarian People's Republic) Hungary	Soviet Union

=== Women's events ===
Event	Gold	Silver	Bronze
Individual Foil	(Soviet Union) Valentina Nikonova	(Hungarian People's Republic) Ildikó Schwarczenberger	(Hungarian People's Republic) Ildikó Újlaky-Rejtő
Team Foil	(Hungarian People's Republic) Hungary	Soviet Union	(Socialist Republic of Romania) Romania
