= Gorius =

Gorius is a surname. Notable people with the surname include:

- Erk Sens-Gorius (born 1946), German fencer
- Julien Gorius (born 1985), French footballer
