= Djurgårdens IF Fäktförening =

The logo of Djurgårdens IF.

Djurgårdens IF Fäktförening is the fencing section of Swedish sports club Djurgårdens IF. Djurgårdens IF Fäktförening is a sovereign club within the alliance club Djurgårdens IF. The fencing section was founded in 1958 and became its own club in 1990.

The fencing club was founded by Herbert Wahlberg in 1958, who built it up together with Béla Rerrich. Rerrich was a Hungarian fencing champion who defected from Hungary in 1956 due to the Hungarian uprising that year which was put down by the Soviet Union. Rerrich was the fence master of Djurgårdens IF from the start until his death in 2005. Under his leadership, members of Djurgårdens IF have won Olympic and World Championship medals as well as numerous Swedish championships in both fencing and modern pentathlon. The club is striving to continue his work.

== Honours ==
=== Olympic medals for members of the club ===
- Modern pentathlon, gold medal, Björn Ferm, Mexico 1968
- Épée, gold medal, men's team, Montreal 1976 (of the five members of the team, Carl von Essen, Göran Flodström, Leif Högström, Hans Jacobson, and Rolf Edling, only Edling was from another Swedish club)
- Modern pentathlon, silver medal, Svante Rasmuson, Los Angeles 1984

=== Swedish championships ===
Djurgårdens IF Fäktförening has won 46 Swedish Championship gold medals, as follows

- Foil, men: 1
  - 1972
- Foil, women: 2
  - 1975, 1978
- Foil, women's team: 3
  - 1962, 1973, 1976
- Épée, men: 13
  - 1963, 1967, 1970, 1973, 1974, 1978, 1979, 1985, 1990, 1996, 1998, 2000, 2014
- Épée, men's team: 20
  - 1966, 1969, 1972, 1973, 1974, 1975, 1977, 1978, 1987, 1988, 1989. 1992, 1993, 1995, 1997, 1998, 1999, 2000, 2006, 2011
- Épée, women: 3
  - 1994, 1996, 1998
- Épée, women's team: 5
  - 1992, 1994, 1995, 1996, 1997
