= Switzerland at the 1976 Summer Olympics =

- IOC code: SUI
- NOC: Swiss Olympic Association

in Montreal, Canada 26 August 1972 – 11 September 1972
- Competitors: 50 (47 men, 3 women) in 12 sports
- Flag bearer: Christian Kauter
- Medals Ranked 20th: Gold 1 Silver 1 Bronze 2 Total 4

Summer Olympics appearances (overview)
- 1896; 1900; 1904; 1908; 1912; 1920; 1924; 1928; 1932; 1936; 1948; 1952; 1956; 1960; 1964; 1968; 1972; 1976; 1980; 1984; 1988; 1992; 1996; 2000; 2004; 2008; 2012; 2016; 2020; 2024

Other related appearances
- 1906 Intercalated Games

Switzerland competed at the 1976 Summer Olympics in Montreal, Quebec, Canada. 50 competitors, 47 men and 3 women, took part in 41 events in 12 sports.

== Medalists ==
Switzerland finished in 20th position in the final medal rankings, with one gold medal and four medals overall.

=== Gold ===
- Christine Stückelberger – Equestrian, Dressage Individual Competition

=== Silver ===
- Ulrich Lehmann, Doris Ramseier and Christine Stückelberger – Equestrian, Dressage Team Competition

=== Bronze ===
- Jürg Röthlisberger – Judo, Men's Half-Heavyweight (93 kg)
- Jean-Blaise Evéquoz, Christian Kauter, Michel Poffet, Daniel Giger and François Suchanecki – Fencing, Men's Épée Team Competition

== Athletics ==
Men's 800 metres

- Rolf Gysin

- Heat – 1:48.69 (→ did not advance)

Men's 5.000 metres

- Markus Ryffel

- Heat – 13:46.07 (→ did not advance)

Men's Long Jump

- Rolf Bernhard

- Qualification – 7.79m
- Final – 7.74m (→ 9th place)

== Cycling ==
Six cyclists represented Switzerland in 1976.

Individual road race

- Richard Trinkler – 5:05:00 (→ 57th place)
- Hansjörg Aemisegger – did not finish (→ no ranking)
- Robert Thalmann – did not finish (→ no ranking)
- Serge Demierre – did not finish (→ no ranking)

1000m time trial

- Walter Bäni – 1:08.112 (→ 8th place)

Individual pursuit

- Robert Dill-Bundi – 14th place

== Fencing ==
Six fencers, all men, represented Switzerland in 1976.

Men's foil

- Patrice Gaille

Men's épée

- Christian Kauter
- François Suchanecki
- Daniel Giger

Men's team épée

- Daniel Giger, Christian Kauter, Michel Poffet, François Suchanecki, Jean-Blaise Evéquoz

== Modern pentathlon ==
One male pentathlete represented Switzerland in 1976.

Individual

- Serge Bindy
