= Rubén Hernández =

Rubén Hernández may refer to:

- Rubén Hernández (fencer) (born 1954), Puerto Rican fencer
- Rubén Darío Hernández (born 1965), Colombian football manager and former striker
- Rubén Hernández (footballer) (born 1968), Mexican football manager and former forward
