= Bertinetti =

Bertinetti is a surname. Notable people with the surname include:

- Franco Bertinetti (1923 – 1995), Italian fencer
- Marcello Bertinetti (1885 – 1967), Italian fencer
- Marcello Bertinetti (fencer born 1952) (born 1952), Italian fencer

== See also ==
- Bertinotti
