= Sneh =

Sneh is a given name and surname. Notable persons with that name include:

== Surname ==
- Efraim Sneh (born 1944), Israeli politician and physician
- Moshe Sneh (1909–1972), Israeli politician and military figure

== Given name ==
- Sneh Bhargava (born 1930), Indian radiologist and medical academic
- Sneh Chousurin (born 1952), Thai fencer
- Sneh Rana (cricketer) (born 1984), Indian cricketer
- Sneh Rana (born 1994), Nepalese sports shooter
- Sneh Wongchaoom (born 1934), Thai sprinter
