= Cristian Sârbu =

Romanian poet

Cristian Sârbu (May 14, 1897 – March 9, 1961) was a Romanian poet.

== Biography ==
He was born into a poor peasant family in Buești, Ialomița County. Sârbu revealed in a short 1959 autobiographical note that his education consisted of five grades of primary school and various courses audited between 1914 and 1916. After moving to the national capital Bucharest, he became a shoemaker's apprentice, and practiced the trade until 1950, when he was named an editor at Viața Românească. Sârbu's proletarian life informed his lyric poetry, inspiring most of his volumes. Pași spre lumină, a short book published in 1935, marked his print debut. A further seven volumes of poetry appeared during his lifetime: Tablouri și cântece din călătoria mea (1938), Slove desculțe (1939), D. Th. Neculuță (1940), Daruri pentru cocioabe (1944), Poeme de ieri și de azi (1951), Cântece pentru Sanda (1956) and Dragoste de viață (1956). Two further books appeared posthumously: Pași spre lumină, a selection of his work; and Pasărea de stea (1971). His contributions appeared in Cuvântul liber, and after World War II, in Gazeta literară, Tânărul scriitor, Tribuna and Viața Românească. Sârbu's poems are autobiographical, evocative, descriptive and sentimental. They emerge from an unpolished sensibility, intimately marked by nostalgic memories of the author's native Bărăgan Plain, which he sometimes employed to produce successful lyric verse.
