= Buești =

- Commune
- Location in Ialomița County

- Location in Romania
- Coordinates: 44°32′N 27°11′E
- Country: Romania
- County: Ialomița

Government
  - Mayor (2024–2028): Nicolae Mihăilă (PSD)
- Elevation: 56 m (184 ft)
- Population (2021-12-01): 966
- Time zone: UTC+02:00 (EET)
  - Summer (DST): UTC+03:00 (EEST)
- Postal code: 927012
- Area code: +(40) 243
- Vehicle reg.: IL
- Website: www.buesti.ro

Buești is a commune located in Ialomița County, Muntenia, Romania. It is composed of a single village, Buești.

Historical population
Year	Pop.	±%
2002	1,223	—
2011	1,074	−12.2%
2021	966	−10.1%
Source: Census data

== Natives ==
- Nicolae Iorgu (born 1944), fencer
- Cristian Sârbu (1897 – 1961), poet
