= Finland at the 1976 Summer Olympics =

- IOC code: FIN
- NOC: Finnish Olympic Committee

in Montreal, Canada July 17–August 1, 1976
- Competitors: 83 (77 men and 6 women) in 14 sports
- Flag bearer: Lasse Virén
- Medals Ranked 11th: Gold 4 Silver 2 Bronze 0 Total 6

Summer Olympics appearances (overview)
- 1908; 1912; 1920; 1924; 1928; 1932; 1936; 1948; 1952; 1956; 1960; 1964; 1968; 1972; 1976; 1980; 1984; 1988; 1992; 1996; 2000; 2004; 2008; 2012; 2016; 2020; 2024

Other related appearances
- 1906 Intercalated Games

Finland competed at the 1976 Summer Olympics in Montreal, Quebec, Canada. 83 competitors, 77 men and 6 women, took part in 63 events in 14 sports.

== Medalists ==
=== Gold ===
- Lasse Virén — Athletics, Men's 5,000m
- Lasse Virén — Athletics, Men's 10,000m
- Pertti Karppinen — Rowing, Men's Single Sculls
- Pertti Ukkola — Wrestling, Men's Greco-Roman Bantamweight

=== Silver ===
- Antti Kalliomäki — Athletics, Men's Pole Vault
- Hannu Siitonen — Athletics, Men's Javelin Throw

== Archery ==
In the nation's second appearance in archery competition at the Olympics, Finland entered two men. Defending bronze medallist Kyösti Laasonen competed again, this time placing 15th.

Men's Individual Competition:

- Kyösti Laasonen — 2379 points (→ 15th place)
- Kauko Laasonen — 2348 points (→ 20th place)

== Athletics ==
Men's 800 metres

- Markku Taskinen
  - Heat — did not start (→ did not advance)

Men's 5.000 metres

- Lasse Virén
  - Heat — 13:33.39
  - Final — 13:24.76 (→ Gold Medal)
- Lasse Orimus
  - Heat — 13:23.43 (→ did not advance)

Men's 10.000 metres

- Lasse Virén
  - Heat — 28:14.95
  - Final — 27:40.38 (→ Gold Medal)
- Martti Vainio
  - Heat — 28:26.60 (→ did not advance)
- Pekka Paivarinta
  - Heat — did not finish (→ did not advance)

Men's 4 × 400 m Relay

- Ossi Karttunen, Markku Kukkoaho, Stig Lönnqvist, and Hannu Mäkelä
  - Heat — 3:05.02
  - Final — 3:06.51 (→ 8th place)

Men's Marathon

- Lasse Virén — 2:13:10 (→ 5th place)
- Håkan Spik — 2:17:50 (→ 16th place)
- Jukka Toivola — 2:20:26 (→ 27th place)

Men's Discus Throw

- Pentti Kahma
  - Qualification — 62.10m
  - Final — 63.12m (→ 6th place)
- Markku Tuokko
  - Qualification — 59.80m (→ did not advance)

== Cycling ==
One cyclist represented Finland in 1976.

Individual road race

- Harry Hannus — 4:49:01 (→ 20th place)

Individual pursuit

- Harry Hannus — 13th place

== Fencing ==
Four fencers, all men, represented Finland in 1976.

Men's épée

- Veikko Salminen

Men's team épée

- Heikki Hulkkonen
- Risto Hurme
- Jussi Pelli
- Veikko Salminen

== Modern pentathlon ==
Three male pentathletes represented Finland in 1976.

Individual

- Risto Hurme
- Jussi Pelli
- Heikki Hulkkonen

Team

- Risto Hurme
- Jussi Pelli
- Heikki Hulkkonen

== See also ==
- Finland at the 1976 Summer Paralympics
