= Bertinotti (surname) =

Bertinotti is an Italian surname. Notable people with the surname include:

- Dominique Bertinotti (born 1954), French politician
- Fausto Bertinotti (born 1940), Italian politician
- Teresa Bertinotti, also known as Teresa Bertinotti-Radicati (1776–1854), Italian soprano and voice teacher

== See also ==
- Bertinetti
