= Roger Menghi =

Luxembourgish fencer

Personal information
- Born: 13 August 1935 (age 90) Differdange, Luxembourg

Sport
- Sport: Fencing

Roger Menghi (born 13 August 1935) is a Luxembourgish fencer. He competed in the individual épée event at the 1976 Summer Olympics.
