= Valentina Nikonova =

Soviet fencer

Personal information
- Born: 5 March 1952 (age 74) Kazan, Russian SFSR, Soviet Union

Sport
- Sport: Fencing
Medal record
Women's fencing
Representing Soviet Union
Olympic Games
Gold medal – first place	1976 Montréal	Team foil
World Championships
Gold medal – first place	1973 Gothenburg	Individual foil
Gold medal – first place	1974 Grenoble	Team foil
Gold medal – first place	1977 Buenos Aires	Team foil
Silver medal – second place	1973 Gothenburg	Team foil
Summer Universiade
Bronze medal – third place	1973 Moscow	Individual foil

Valentina Nikonova (Russian: Валентина Геннадьевна Никонова; born 5 March 1952) is a Soviet fencer. She won a gold medal in the women's team foil event at the 1976 Summer Olympics.
