= Asghar Khodayari =

Iranian cyclist

Personal information
- Born: 9 March 1953 (age 73)

Cycling career
- Sport: Cycling

Asghar Khodayari (Persian: اصغر خدایاری; born 9 March 1953) is an Iranian former cyclist. He competed in the individual road race and team time trial events at the 1976 Summer Olympics.
