= Chile at the 1976 Summer Olympics =

- IOC code: CHI
- NOC: Chilean Olympic Committee

in Montreal
- Competitors: 7 (7 men and 0 women) in 4 sports
- Flag bearer: Juan Inostroza
- Medals: Gold 0 Silver 0 Bronze 0 Total 0

Summer Olympics appearances (overview)
- 1896; 1900–1908; 1912; 1920; 1924; 1928; 1932; 1936; 1948; 1952; 1956; 1960; 1964; 1968; 1972; 1976; 1980; 1984; 1988; 1992; 1996; 2000; 2004; 2008; 2012; 2016; 2020; 2024

Chile competed at the 1976 Summer Olympics in Montreal, Quebec, Canada. Seven competitors, all men, took part in eight events in four sports.

== Athletics ==
Men's 10.000 metres

- Edmundo Warnke
  - Heat – 28:43.63 (→ did not advance)

== Cycling ==
Two cyclists represented Chile in 1976.

Sprint

- Richard Tormen – 9th place

1000m time trial

- Richard Tormen – 1:09.468 (→ 16th place)

Individual pursuit

- Fernando Vera – 18th place

== Fencing ==
One fencer represented Chile in 1976.

Men's épée

- Juan Inostroza
