= Anna-Lisa Berglund =

Swedish archer (1935–2019)

Anna-Lisa Berglund (18 January 1935 – 3 June 2019) was a Swedish archer who competed at three Olympic Games in archery for Sweden.

== Career ==
Berglund held two world records at the 30m distance.

In 1971 she became the 23rd Swedish archer to receive a Storr Grabb award.

She participated in the women's individual event at the 1972, 1976 and the 1980 Olympic Games finishing 34th, 11th and 16th respectively.
