= Fazlollah Dehkhoda =

Iranian weightlifter

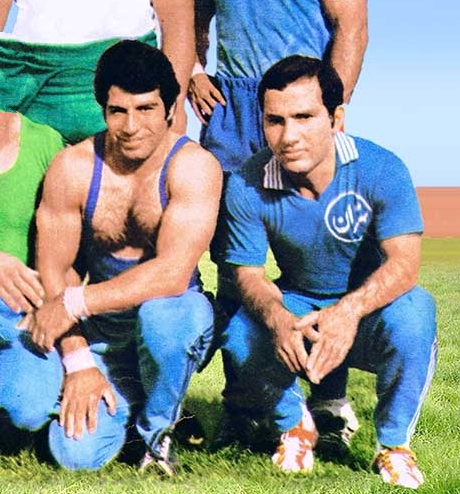
- Dehkhoda (left) in 1975

Personal information
- Born: 18 March 1949 (age 77) Isfahan, Iran
- Height: 156 cm (5 ft 1 in)

Sport
- Sport: Weightlifting

Fazlollah Dehkhoda (Persian: فضل الله دهخدا, born 18 March 1949) is a retired Iranian bantamweight weightlifter. He placed eighth at the 1976 Summer Olympics and ninth at the 1974 World Weightlifting Championships.
