= Rolf Svensson =

Swedish archer (born 1935)

Personal information
- Nationality: Swedish
- Born: 29 June 1935 (age 89); Stockholm, Sweden

Sport
- Sport: Archery

Rolf Svensson (born 29 June 1935) is a Swedish archer. He competed at the 1972 Summer Olympics, the 1976 Summer Olympics and the 1980 Summer Olympics.
