= Peter Weibel (cyclist) =

German cyclist (1950–2017)

Personal information
- Born: 14 September 1950 Hockenheim, West Germany
- Died: 9 August 2017 (aged 66)

Cycling career
- Sport: Cycling

Peter Weibel (14 September 1950 – 9 August 2017) was a German cyclist. He competed for West Germany at the 1972 Summer Olympics and the 1976 Summer Olympics.

Weibel died of cancer on 9 August 2017 at the age of 66.
