= Leif Högström =

Swedish fencer (born 1955)

Personal information
- Nationality: Swedish
- Born: 4 July 1955 (age 70) Stockholm, Sweden

Sport
- Country: Sweden
- Sport: Fencing
- Club: Djurgårdens IF
Medal record
Men's fencing
Representing Sweden
Olympic Games
Gold medal – first place	1976 Montreal	Team épée

Leif Nils Oskar Högström (born 4 July 1955) is a Swedish fencer and Olympic Champion. He competed at the 1976 Summer Olympics in Montreal, where he won a gold medal in épée with the Swedish team.

Högström represented Djurgårdens IF.
