= Jaroslav Jurka =

Czech fencer (born 1949)

Personal information
- Born: 8 July 1949 (age 76) Olomouc, Czechoslovakia (now Czech Republic)
- Relative: Jakub Jurka (grandson)

Sport
- Sport: Fencing

Jaroslav Jurka (born 8 July 1949) is a Czech fencer. He competed at the 1976 and 1980 Summer Olympics.
