= Hans-Jürgen Hehn =

German fencer (born 1944)

Personal information
- Born: 1 October 1944 (age 81) Lauda-Königshofen, Germany

Sport
- Sport: Fencing
Medal record
Men's fencing
Representing West Germany
Olympic Games
Silver medal – second place	1976 Montréal	Épée, individual
Silver medal – second place	1976 Montréal	Épée, team

Hans-Jürgen Hehn (born 1 October 1944) is a retired German épée fencer. He won silver medals in the individual and team events at the 1976 Summer Olympics.
