= Alexander Pusch =

German fencer

Personal information
- Born: 15 May 1955 (age 71) Tauberbischofsheim, West Germany

Sport
- Sport: Fencing
- Club: FC Tauberbischofsheim
Medal record
Men's fencing
Representing West Germany
Olympic Games
Gold medal – first place	1976 Montreal	Épée Individual
Gold medal – first place	1984 Los Angeles	Épée Team
Silver medal – second place	1976 Montreal	Épée Team
Silver medal – second place	1988 Seoul	Épée Team

Alexander Pusch (born 15 May 1955 in Tauberbischofsheim, Baden-Württemberg) is a German fencer and Olympic champion in épée competition.

== Biography ==
Alexander Pusch fought for the Fencing-Club Tauberbischofsheim. He won a gold medal in the individual épée event and a team silver medal at the 1976 Summer Olympics in Montreal. He won a gold medal in the team épée in 1984, and a silver medal in 1988. In July 2016, he was inducted into Germany's Sports Hall of Fame.
