= Peter Zobl-Wessely =

Austrian modern pentathlete and fencer

Personal information
- Born: 12 July 1949 (age 76) Mistelbach, Austria

Sport
- Sport: Modern pentathlon, fencing

Peter Zobl-Wessely (born 12 July 1949) is an Austrian modern pentathlete and épée fencer. He competed as a modern pentathlete at the 1972 Summer Olympics and as a fencer at the 1976 Summer Olympics.
