= Juan Daniel Pirán =

Argentine fencer (born 1957)

Personal information
- Born: 23 October 1957 (age 68)

Sport
- Sport: Fencing

Juan Daniel Pirán (born 23 October 1957) is an Argentine fencer. He competed in the individual and team épée events at the 1976 Summer Olympics.
