= Alain Dansereau =

Canadian fencer (born 1954)

Personal information
- Born: 13 December 1954 (age 71) Montreal, Quebec, Canada

Sport
- Sport: Fencing

Alain Dansereau (born 13 December 1954) is a Canadian fencer. He competed in the individual and team épée events at the 1976 Summer Olympics.
