= Edward Bozek =

American fencer (1950–2022)

Personal information
- Born: Edward Scott Bozek; November 20, 1950 Salem, Massachusetts, U.S.
- Died: January 7, 2022 (aged 71) Fairfax, Virginia, U.S.

Sport
- Sport: Fencing

Edward Scott Bozek (November 20, 1950 – January 7, 2022), also known as Scotty Bozek, was an American épée fencer. He competed at the 1972 and 1976 Summer Olympics.

Bozek earned a degree in Russian Studies from the University of Massachusetts in Boston in 1972. He earned a masters in international affairs in Central and Eastern European Studies from Columbia University. He also studied at the National Defense University (the Industrial College of the Armed Forces), and earned another masters in national resource strategy in 1999.

Bozek competed at the 1971 and 1975 Pan American Games, winning gold medals both years in team épée and a silver medal in 1971 in individual épée. He was US Champion in épée in 1973 and 1975.

Bozek died on January 7, 2022, at the age of 71.

== See also ==
- List of USFA Division I National Champions
