= Marcello Bertinetti (fencer, born 1952) =

Italian fencer (born 1952)

Personal information
- Nickname: Cito
- Born: 21 July 1952 (age 73) Vercelli, Italy

Sport
- Sport: Fencing

Marcello "Cito" Bertinetti (born 21 July 1952) is an Italian fencer.

== Career ==
He ended 6th at the 1972 World Cadets and Juniors Fencing Championships in Madrid and won the Italian épée champion title in 1973. He won the bronze medal in the team épée competition at the 1973 Summer Universiade. He competed in the individual and team épée events at the 1976 Summer Olympics.

== Personal life ==
He is the son of Franco Bertinetti and grandson of Marcello Bertinetti, both fencers. He studied engineering at university level before embarking on a career in publishing. He founded White Star in 1982, sold this to De Agostini in 2009 and started working for Swiss company Nui Nui in 2014.
