= Denis Cunningham =

Hong Kong fencer

Personal information
- Born: 13 July 1950 (age 75)

Sport
- Sport: Fencing

Denis Claude Cunningham (born 13 July 1950) is a Hong Kong fencer. He competed at the 1976 and 1984 Summer Olympics.
