= Jerzy Janikowski =

Polish fencer (1952–2006)

Personal information
- Born: 13 April 1952 Dąbrowa Górnicza, Poland
- Died: 21 December 2006 (aged 54) Katowice, Poland

Sport
- Sport: Fencing

Jerzy Janikowski (13 April 1952 – 21 December 2006) was a Polish fencer. He competed in the individual and team épée events at the 1972 and 1976 Summer Olympics.
