= Jean-Blaise Evéquoz =

Swiss fencer

Personal information
- Born: 27 November 1953 (age 72)

Sport
- Sport: Fencing
Medal record
Men's fencing
Representing Switzerland
Olympic Games
Bronze medal – third place	1976 Montréal	Épée, team

Jean-Blaise Evéquoz (born 27 November 1953) is a Swiss fencer. He won a bronze medal in the team épée event at the 1976 Summer Olympics. He is also an artist with works on display with the Art of the Olympians.
