= Matthew Chan =

Hong Kong fencer

Personal information
- Born: 11 August 1947
- Died: 24 November 2016 (aged 69)

Sport
- Sport: Fencing

Matthew Chan Wah Hei (11 August 1947 – 24 November 2016) was a Hong Kong épée, foil and sabre fencer. He competed at the 1972 and 1976 Summer Olympics. On 24 November 2016, Chan died from cancer.
