= Jussi Pelli =

Finnish modern pentathlete and fencer

Personal information
- Born: 4 November 1954 (age 71) Helsinki, Finland

Sport
- Sport: Modern pentathlon, fencing

Jussi Pelli (born 4 November 1954) is a Finnish modern pentathlete and épée fencer. He fenced at the 1976 Summer Olympics and competed in the modern pentathlon at the 1976, 1980 and 1984 Summer Olympics.

Pelli won the Finnish modern pentathlon championship in 1977 and 1981. He won the Finnish men's team pentathlon championship in 1976, 1981 and 1982.
