= Zbigniew Matwiejew =

Polish fencer

Personal information
- Born: 14 February 1949 (age 77) Gliwice, Poland

Sport
- Sport: Fencing

Zbigniew Matwiejew (born 14 February 1949) is a Polish fencer. He competed in the individual and team épée events at the 1976 Summer Olympics.
