= Geza Tatrallyay =

Canadian fencer (born 1949)

Personal information
- Nationality: Canadian, Hungarian
- Born: 11 February 1949 (age 77) Budapest, Hungary
- Website: http://www.gezatatrallyay.com

Sport
- Sport: Fencing

Geza Tatrallyay (born 11 February 1949) is a Canadian fencer and author. He competed in the individual and team épée events at the 1976 Summer Olympics.

== Early life ==
Tatrallyay was born in Budapest, Hungary in 1949 and escaped with his family in 1956, emigrating to Canada. He attended the University of Toronto Schools as a teenager, going on to graduated from Harvard University; Oxford University, as a Rhodes Scholar; and London School of Economics.
