= Kam Wai Leung =

Hong Kong fencer

Personal information
- Born: 6 July 1950 (age 75)

Sport
- Sport: Fencing

Kam Wai Leung (born 6 July 1950) is a Hong Kong épée, foil and sabre fencer. He competed in five events at the 1976 Summer Olympics.
