= Tim Belson =

British fencer

Personal information
- Born: 25 April 1951 (age 75) Weston super Mare, Somerset

Sport
- Sport: Fencing

Timothy Euan Belson (born 25 April 1951) is a British fencer. He competed in the individual and team épée events at the 1976 Summer Olympics. He was a two times British fencing champion, winning the épée title at the British Fencing Championships in 1975 and 1979.
