= Heikki Hulkkonen =

Finnish modern pentathlete and fencer

Personal information
- Born: 3 July 1955 (age 70) Orimattila, Finland

Sport
- Sport: Modern pentathlon, fencing

Heikki Hulkkonen (born 3 July 1955) is a Finnish modern pentathlete and fencer. He competed both events at the 1976 and 1980 Summer Olympics.
