= Hanns Jana =

German fencer (born 1952)

Personal information
- Born: 18 July 1952 (age 73) Tauberbischofsheim, West Germany

Sport
- Sport: Fencing
Medal record
Men's fencing
Representing West Germany
Olympic Games
Silver medal – second place	1976 Montréal	Team épée
World Championships
Silver medal – second place	1975 Budapest	Team épée
Silver medal – second place	1979 Melbourne	Team épée
Summer Universiade
Bronze medal – third place	1979 Mexico City	Individual épée

Hanns Jana (born 18 July 1952) is a German fencer. He won a silver medal in the team épée event at the 1976 Summer Olympics.
