= George Varaljay =

Canadian fencer

Personal information
- Born: 9 March 1941 (age 85) Budapest, Hungary

Sport
- Sport: Fencing

George Varaljay (born 9 March 1941) is a Canadian fencer. He competed in the individual and team épée events at the 1976 Summer Olympics.
