= Carl von Essen =

Swedish fencer (1940–2021)

Personal information
- Nationality: Swedish
- Born: 18 October 1940 Jönköping, Sweden
- Died: 11 November 2021 (aged 81) Björnlunda, Sweden

Sport
- Country: Sweden
- Sport: Fencing
Medal record
Men's fencing
Representing Sweden
Olympic Games
Gold medal – first place	1976 Montreal	Team épée

Carl von Essen (18 October 1940 – 11 November 2021) was a Swedish fencer and Olympic champion. He competed at the 1976 Summer Olympics in Montreal, where he won a gold medal in épée with the Swedish team.

Von Essen represented Föreningen för Fäktkonstens Främjande and Djurgårdens IF. Von Essen died in Björnlunda on 11 November 2021, at the age of 81.
