= Veikko Salminen =

Finnish modern pentathlete and fencer

Personal information
- Born: 12 August 1945 (age 80) Helsinki, Finland

Sport
- Sport: Modern pentathlon, fencing
Medal record
Men's Modern Pentathlon
Representing Finland
Olympic Games
Bronze medal – third place	1972 Munich	Team

Veikko Salminen (born 12 August 1945) is a Finnish modern pentathlete and épée fencer. He won a bronze medal in the team modern pentathlon event at the 1972 Summer Olympics.

His daughter, Laura Salminen, and son, Ismo Salminen, are also a modern pentathlon athletes.
