= Omar Vergara =

Argentine fencer (1943–2018)

Personal information
- Born: 6 April 1943
- Died: 28 June 2018 (aged 75)

Sport
- Sport: Fencing

Omar Vergara (6 April 1943 – 29 June 2018) was an Argentine fencer. He competed at the 1968, 1972 and 1976 Summer Olympics.
