= George Masin =

American fencer

Personal information
- Born: 31 March 1947 (age 79) New York, New York, United States

Sport
- Sport: Fencing
- Event: épée
- College team: NYU
- Club: New York Athletic Club

George Gabriel Masin (born March 31, 1947) is an American Olympic épée fencer who attended New York University from 1964 to 1968.

== Biography ==
He began fencing in September 1964 as a walk-on on the NYU fencing team. In March 1967, he won the ECAC individual épée championship, and later that month won the NCAA individual épée championship and helped NYU win the overall fencing team championship. In 1968, he finished second in the ECAC individual épée championships and fourth in the NCAA individual championships, and helped NYU finish second in the overall fencing team championship.

He has been a member of the New York Athletic Club since 1969.

In the U.S. National Fencing Championships in 1969 he finished third in the individual épée championships, and he subsequently also finished in the top eight in 1970, 1972, 1976 (as champion), 1983, 1989, 1990, and 2001, making him the only American fencer to finish in the top eight in each of five different decades.

He has also been active as a referee. He has refereed USFA competitions at the divisional, sectional, and national levels. He has refereed collegiate competitions at the dual-meet, regional, and national levels. He has refereed international World Cup competitions, including the finals.

As an administrator, he has served at various times as a member of the board of directors and Chairman of the USFA Metropolitan Division, a member of the USFA National Board of Directors, a Vice President of the USFA, an Executive Vice President of the USFA, a member of various USF national committees and commissions, and on the bout committee of various National Championships, Junior Olympics, and North American Circuit competitions.

He was a Competition Manager at the 1996 Olympic Games in Atlanta.

In 1973, he proposed a comprehensive point system for the selection of members of U.S. international fencing teams. Since its adoption, all U.S. international fencing team members have been selected via objective criteria. The last team member to be selected via subjective criteria was for the 1972 Olympic Games. Largely as a result of this effort, the USFA created the position of Athlete Representative, a non-voting member of the USFA committee that develops the criteria for international team selection. Masin was selected as the first Athlete Representative.

He has also been responsible for several important changes as to how fencers are seeded into competitions. For example, he proposed and established the criteria for the awarding of "D" and "E" classifications, and proposed the system by which classifications are slowly lost if not re-earned by appending the year of achievement to the classification letter.

He proposed the establishment of the first national-level competitions restricted by classification, now known as Division II and Division III competitions.

When women first began competing in sabre, he developed the criteria used to decide when women's sabre would be awarded Division I National Championship status. The criteria were submitted by the Women's Sabre Committee to the Board of Directors, adopted, and resulted in the establishment of the Women's Sabre Division I National Championships by unanimous vote when the criteria were met.

== Accomplishments ==
- 1967 NCAA Men's Épée Champion
- 1971 Heidenheim Épée World Cup, 3rd Place
- 1971 Pan American Games Gold Medal, Men's Épée Team
- 1972 U.S. Olympic Team
- 1976 U.S. Men's Épée Champion
- 1976 U.S. Olympic Team
- 1986 Inducted into NYU Sports Hall of Fame
- 1987 Pan American Games Silver Medal, Men's Épée Team
- 1987 Montreal Épée World Cup, 6th Place
- 1997 Sydney Épée World Cup, 3rd Place
- 2002 Inducted into USFA Hall of Fame
- 2011 Inducted into NYAC Hall of Fame
- 12 times gold medalist in U.S. Men's Épée Team Championships
- 5 times a member of U.S. World Championship Team

== See also ==
- List of American epee fencers
- USFA
- List of USFA Division I National Champions
- List of NCAA fencing champions
