= Juan Inostroza =

Chilean fencer

Personal information
- Born: December 27, 1942
- Died: June 2, 1989 (aged 46)

Sport
- Sport: Fencing

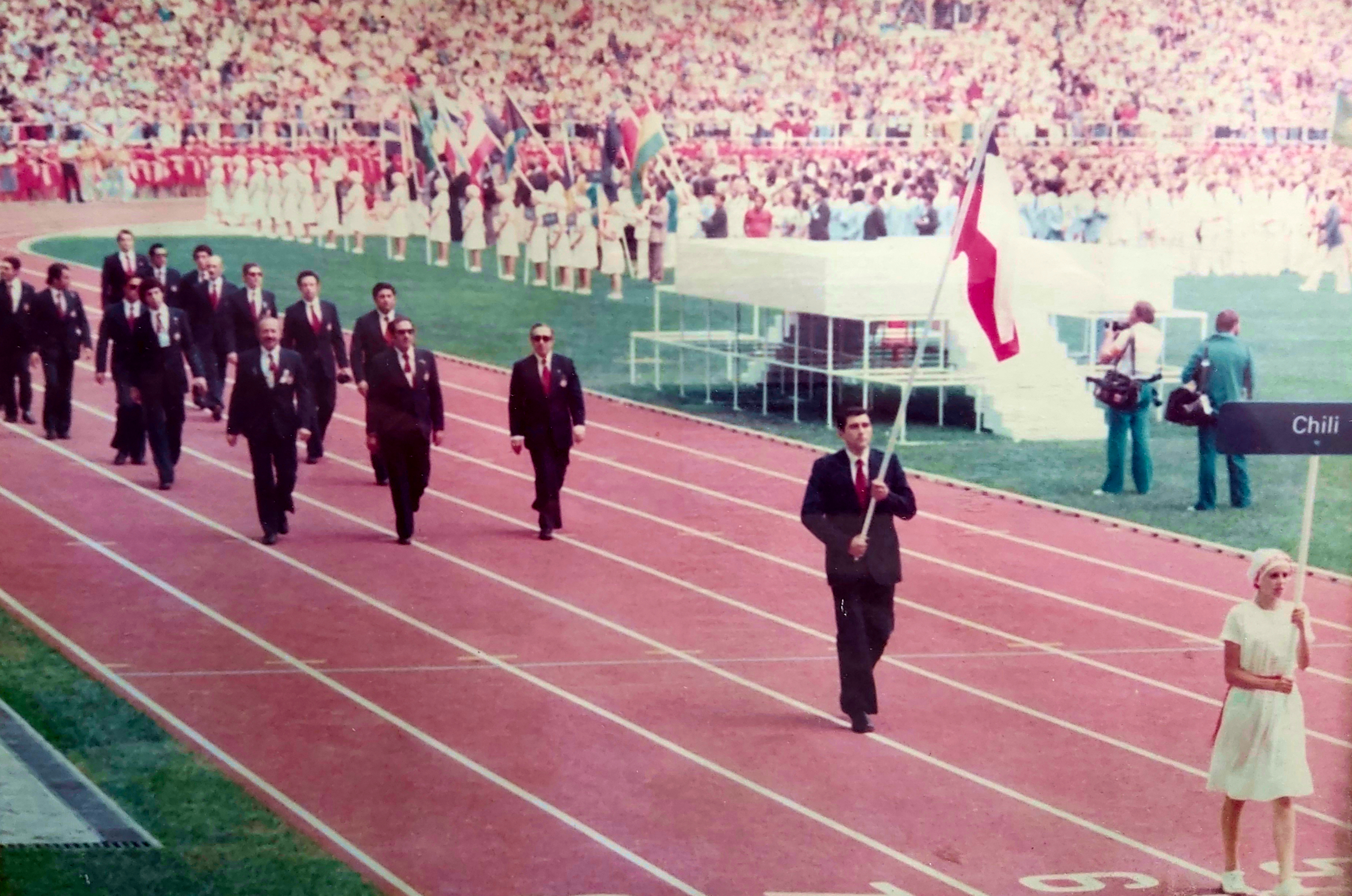
Juan Inostroza, flag bearer at the 1976 Montreal Olympic Games

Juan Luciano Inostroza Tapia (27 December 1942 – 2 June 1989) was a Chilean fencer. He competed in the individual épée event at the 1976 Summer Olympics.
