= Sarkis Assadourian (fencer) =

Iranian fencer (born 1948)

Personal information
- Born: 22 May 1948 (age 78)

Sport
- Sport: Fencing
Medal record
Men's fencing
Representing Iran
Asian Games
Gold medal – first place	1974 Tehran	Team épée
Bronze medal – third place	1974 Tehran	Team foil

Sarkis Assadourian (Persian: سركیس آسادوریان; Armenian: Սարգիս Ասադուրյան; born 22 May 1948) is an Iranian fencer of Armenian descent. He competed in the individual and team épée and team foil events at the 1976 Summer Olympics.
