= Marceli Wiech =

Polish fencer

Personal information
- Born: 8 October 1954 (age 71) Chorzów, Poland

Sport
- Sport: Fencing

Marceli Wiech (born 8 October 1954) is a Polish fencer. He competed in the individual and team épée events at the 1976 Summer Olympics.
