= Ole Mørch (fencer) =

Norwegian fencer

Personal information
- Born: 15 March 1950 (age 76) Oslo, Norway

Sport
- Sport: Fencing

Ole Mørch (born 15 March 1950) is a Norwegian fencer. He competed in the individual and team épée events at the 1972 and 1976 Summer Olympics.
