= Paul Szabo (fencer) =

Romanian fencer

Personal information
- Born: 8 October 1954 (age 71) Cluj-Napoca, Romania

Sport
- Sport: Fencing

Paul Szabo (born 8 October 1954) is a Romanian fencer. He competed in the individual and team épée events at the 1976 Summer Olympics.
