= Reinhold Behr =

German fencer

Personal information
- Born: 17 October 1948 (age 77) Tauberbischofsheim, Allied-occupied Germany

Sport
- Sport: Fencing
Medal record
Men's fencing
Representing West Germany
Olympic Games
| Silver medal – second place | 1976 Montréal | Épée, team |

Reinhold Behr (born 17 October 1948) is a German fencer.

== Biography ==
Reinhold Behr fought for the Fencing-Club Tauberbischofsheim. He won a silver medal in the team épée event at the 1976 Summer Olympics.
