= Jeppe Normann =

Norwegian fencer (born 1951)

Personal information
- Born: 15 September 1951 (age 74) Oslo, Norway

Sport
- Sport: Fencing

Jeppe Normann (born 15 September 1951) is a Norwegian épée and foil fencer. He competed at the 1972, 1976 and 1984 Summer Olympics.
