= Iraj Dastgerdi =

Iranian fencer

Personal information
- Born: 31 December 1955 (age 70)

Sport
- Sport: Fencing

Iraj Dastgerdi (Persian: ایرج دستگردی; born 31 December 1955) is an Iranian fencer. He competed in the individual and team épée events at the 1976 Summer Olympics.
