= Daniel Feraud =

Argentine fencer (born 1953)

Personal information
- Born: 15 November 1953 (age 72)

Sport
- Sport: Fencing

Daniel Feraud (born 15 November 1953) is an Argentine épée and foil fencer. He competed at the 1972 and 1976 Summer Olympics. Son of Roberto Eduardo Jose Feraud.
