= Nicolae Iorgu =

Romanian fencer (born 1944)

Personal information
- Born: 25 June 1944 (age 82) Buești, Romania

Sport
- Sport: Fencing

Nicolae Iorgu (born 25 June 1944) is a Romanian fencer. He competed at the 1972 and 1976 Summer Olympics.
