= John Pezza =

Italian fencer (born 1952)

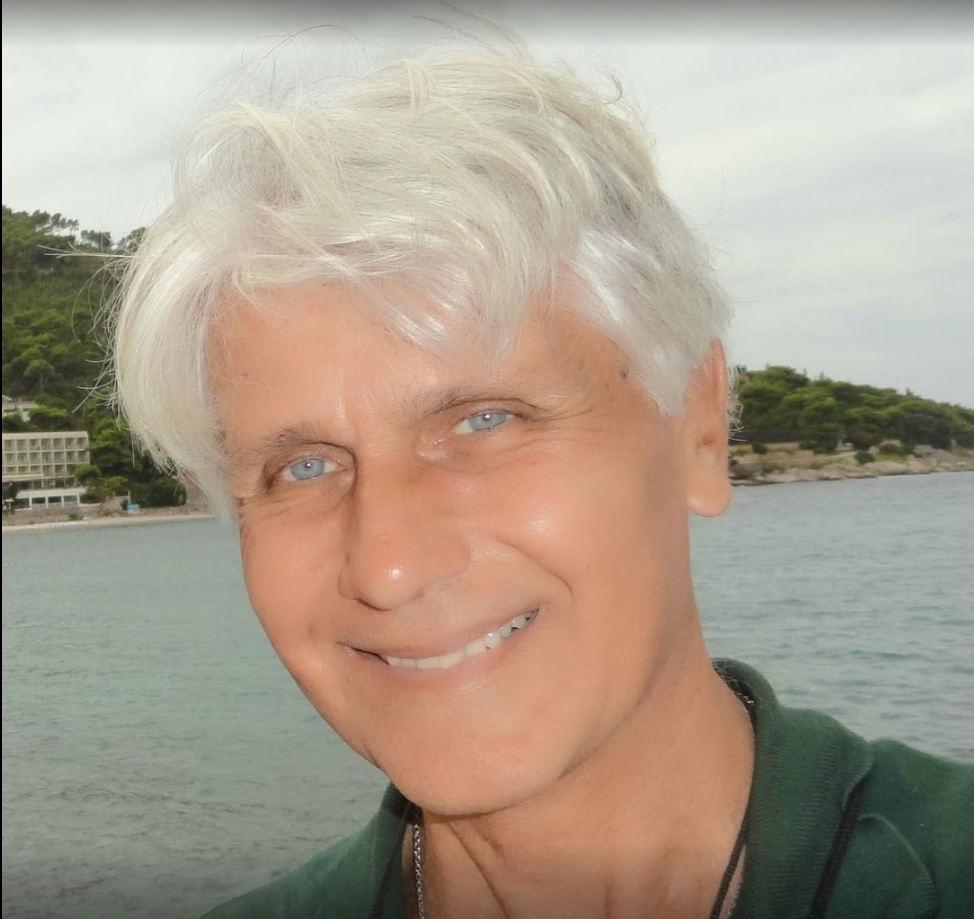

Personal information
- Born: 6 October 1952 (age 73) Milan, Italy
- Height: 187 cm (6 ft 2 in)

Sport
- Sport: Fencing
Medal record
Mediterranean Games
| Gold medal – first place | 1975 Algiers | Individual épée |

John Pezza (born 6 October 1952) is an Italian fencer. He competed in the individual (ranked 9th) and team épée events of the 1976 Summer Olympics. He won a gold medal at the 1975 Mediterranean Games in the individual épée event.
