= Teddy Bourne =

British fencer (born 1948)

Personal information
- Full name: Edward Owen "Teddy" Bourne
- Born: 30 September 1948 (age 77) Romford, Essex, England
- Height: 6 ft 2.5 in (189.2 cm)
- Weight: 159 lb (72 kg)

Sport
- Country: Great Britain
- Sport: Fencing
- Event: Epee

Edward Owen Bourne (born 30 September 1948) is a British Olympic épée fencer.

== Early and personal life ==
He was born in Romford, England. He became a solicitor in London, working as a commercial property lawyer at the law firm Clifford Chance, where he headed the department. He has also been a Trustee of the RSPCA Central London Branch, the Peabody Trust, and the Hampstead Garden Suburb Trust. He is currently a trustee of Compassion in World Farming.

== Fencing career ==
He was a six times British fencing champion, winning the épée title at the British Fencing Championships in 1966, 1972, 1974, 1976, 1977 and 1978.

He competed at the 1968 Summer Olympics in Mexico City at the age of 20, the 1972 Summer Olympics in Munich, and the 1976 Summer Olympics in Montreal.
