= Rubén Hernández (fencer) =

Puerto Rican fencer

Rubén A. Hernández
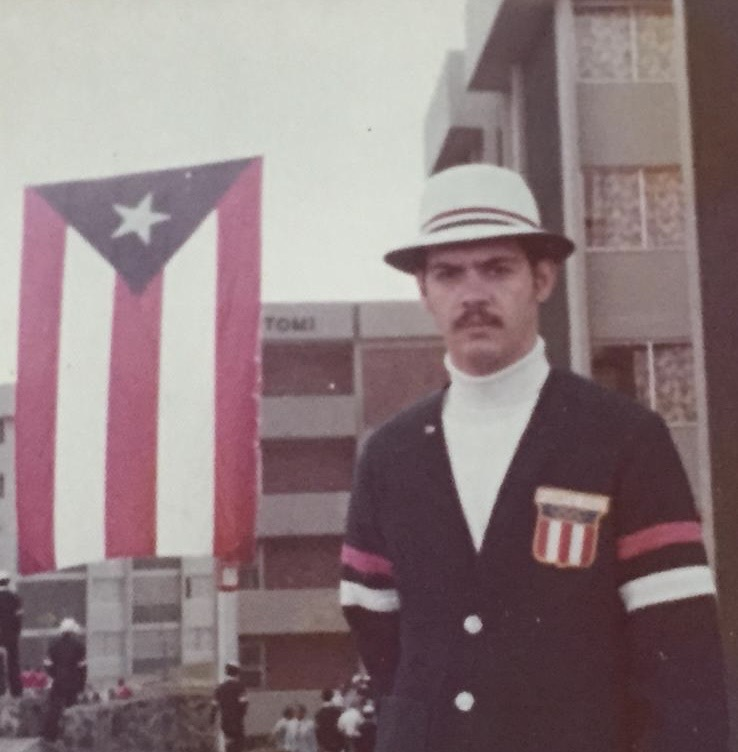
- Ruben A. Hernandez at the 1975 Panamerican Games in Mexico.

Personal information
- Nationality: Puerto Rican
- Born: 21 April 1954 (age 72) Aguadilla, Puerto Rico

Sport
- Country: Puerto Rico
- Sport: Fencing
- Team: Puerto Rico National Olympic Committee

Achievements and titles
- Olympic finals: Montreal Summer Olympics 1976

Rubén Astor Hernández Guzmán Jiménez Iglesias (born April 21, 1954) is a Puerto Rican fencer who competed in the individual épée event at the XXI Olympic Games.

== Early life and background ==
Hernández was born on April 21, 1954, at the former Ramey Air Force Base in Aguadilla, Puerto Rico to Tomás Hernández Jiménez and Virginia Guzmán Iglesiasand and was raised in Quebradillas.

== Fencing career ==
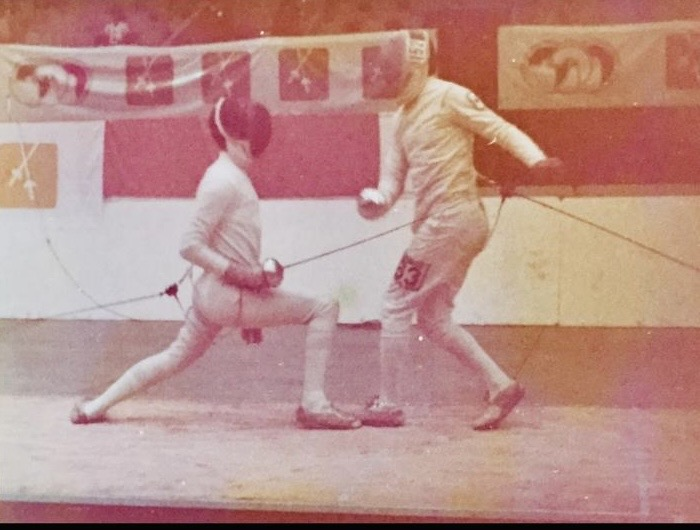
Ruben A. Hernandez at the Montreal Olympics 1976

In 1971, at 17, Hernández won the gold medal in foil at the first Puerto Rican Novice National Championship held in Quebradillas.

In 1976, Hernández participated in the XXI Olympic Games where he placed 62nd.

== Long-distance cycling ==
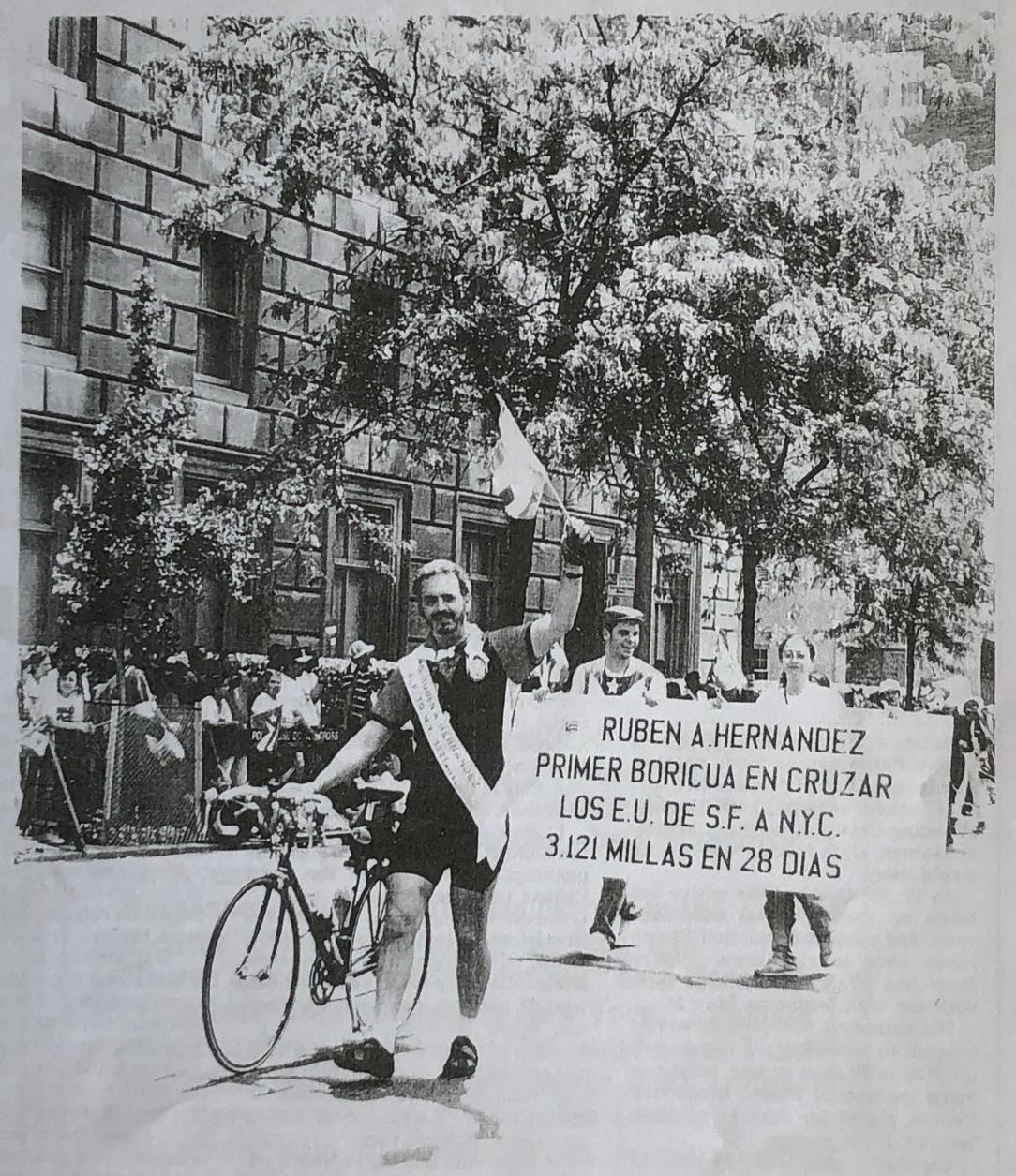
Ruben A. Hernandez at the 1995 Puerto Rican Day Parade after biking across the USA

In addition to fencing, Hernández has participated in long-distance cycling. He completed a 1200-mile ride from New York City to Orlando, Florida in 1987, and a 1,545-mile ride around Puerto Rico in 1993, completing six laps around the island.

In 1995, Hernández cycled 3,121 miles in 28 days from San Francisco to New York City, with an average of 111 miles per day.
