= Esfandiar Zarnegar =

Iranian fencer

Personal information
- Born: 24 May 1942 (age 84) Kermanshah, Iran

Sport
- Sport: Fencing
Medal record
Men's fencing
Representing Iran
Asian Games
Gold medal – first place	1974 Tehran	Team épée

Esfandiar Zarnegar (Persian: اسفندیار زرنگار; born 24 May 1942) is an Iranian fencer. He competed in the individual and team épée events at the 1976 Summer Olympics.
