= Göran Flodström =

Swedish fencer

Personal information
- Nationality: Swedish
- Born: 27 January 1953 (age 73) Stockholm, Sweden

Sport
- Country: Sweden
- Sport: Fencing
Medal record
Men's fencing
Representing Sweden
Olympic Games
Gold medal – first place	1976 Montreal	Team épée

Göran Flodström (born 27 January 1953) is a Swedish fencer and Olympic Champion. He competed at the 1976 Summer Olympics in Montreal, where he won a gold medal in épée with the Swedish team.

Flodström represented Djurgårdens IF.
