= Erk Sens-Gorius =

German fencer

Personal information
- Born: 25 January 1946 (age 80) Hannover, Allied-occupied Germany

Sport
- Sport: Fencing
Medal record
Men's fencing
Representing West Germany
Olympic Games
Gold medal – first place	1976 Montréal	Foil, team

Erk Sens-Gorius (born 25 January 1946) is a German fencer. He won a gold medal in the team foil event at the 1976 Summer Olympics.
