= Aleksandr Bykov =

Soviet fencer

Personal information
- Born: 23 January 1953 (age 73)

Sport
- Sport: Fencing

Aleksandr Bykov (Russian: Александр Быков; born 23 January 1953) is a former Soviet fencer. He competed in the individual and team épée events at the 1976 Summer Olympics.
