= Sneh Chousurin =

Thai fencer

Personal information
- Born: 26 January 1952 (age 74)

Sport
- Sport: Fencing

Sneh Chousurin (born 26 January 1952) is a Thai fencer. He competed in the individual and team épée events at the 1976 Summer Olympics.
