= Christian Kauter =

Swiss fencer (born 1947)

Personal information
- Born: 6 May 1947 (age 79) Bern, Switzerland

Sport
- Sport: Fencing
Medal record
Men's fencing
Representing Switzerland
Olympic Games
Silver medal – second place	1972 Munich	Épée, team
Bronze medal – third place	1976 Montréal	Épée, team

Christian Kauter (born 6 May 1947) is a Swiss fencer. He won a silver medal in the team épée event at the 1972 Summer Olympics and a bronze in the same event at the 1976 Summer Olympics.

His sons Fabian Kauter and Michael Kauter have also fenced in the Olympics, both in épée.
