= François Suchanecki =

Swiss fencer

Personal information
- Born: 23 December 1949 (age 76) Basel, Switzerland

Sport
- Sport: Fencing
Medal record
Men's fencing
Representing Switzerland
Olympic Games
Silver medal – second place	1972 Munich	Team épée
Bronze medal – third place	1976 Montréal	Team épée
World Championships
Silver medal – second place	1977 Buenos Aires	Team épée
Silver medal – second place	1981 Clermont-Ferrand	Team épée
Bronze medal – third place	1979 Melbourne	Team épée
Summer Universiade
Bronze medal – third place	1977 Sofia	Individual épée

François Suchanecki (born 23 December 1949) is a Swiss fencer. He won a silver medal in the team épée event at the 1972 Summer Olympics and a bronze in the same event at the 1976 Summer Olympics. In 1977 he won a silver medal in the team épée event at the world championship in Buenos Aires and in 1981 a silver medal in the same event in Clermont-Ferrand as well as in 1979 a bronze medal in the same event in Melbourne.
