= Daniel Giger =

Swiss fencer

Personal information
- Nationality: Swiss
- Born: 1 October 1949 (age 76)
- Height: 6 ft 1 in (1.85 m)
- Weight: 165 lb (75 kg)

Sport
- Sport: Fencing
Medal record
Men's fencing
Representing Switzerland
Olympic Games
Silver medal – second place	1972 Munich	Épée, team
Bronze medal – third place	1976 Montréal	Épée, team

Daniel Giger (born 1 October 1949) is a Swiss fencer. He won a silver medal in the team épée event at the 1972 Summer Olympics and a bronze in the same event at the 1976 Summer Olympics.
