= Hans Jacobson =

Personal information
- Nationality: Swedish
- Born: 17 March 1947 Stockholm, Sweden
- Died: 9 July 1984 (aged 37) Stockholm, Sweden

Sport
- Country: Sweden
- Sport: Fencing, modern pentathlon
Medal record
Men's fencing
Representing Sweden
Olympic Games
Gold medal – first place	1976 Montreal	Team épée

Hans Jacobson (March 17, 1947 – July 9, 1984) was a Swedish modern pentathlete, fencer and Olympic Champion. He competed at the 1976 Summer Olympics in Montreal, where he won a gold medal in épée with the Swedish team. He originally won a bronze medal in the modern pentathlon team competition at the 1968 Summer Olympics along with Björn Ferm and Hans-Gunnar Liljenvall. However, he was stripped of the medal after Liljenvall failed a drug test (for alcohol).

Jacobson represented K1 IF and Djurgårdens IF. For Djurgårdens IF, he became the 1974 Swedish champion in individual épée and eight-time champion in team épée.
