= Rolf Edling =

Swedish fencer (born 1943)

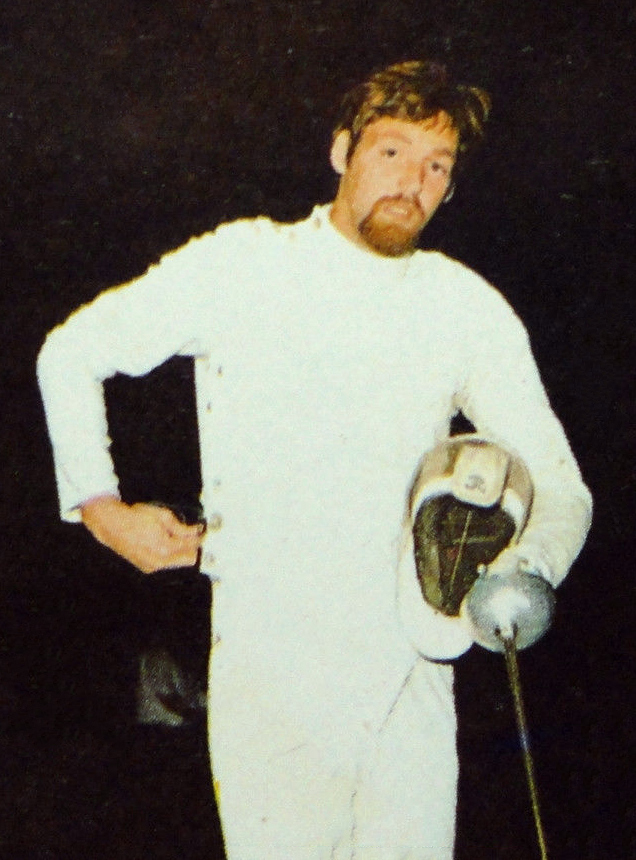
- Rolf Edling in 1972

Personal information
- Born: 30 November 1943 (age 82) Bombay, India
- Height: 196 cm (6 ft 5 in)
- Weight: 91 kg (201 lb)

Sport
- Country: Sweden
- Sport: Fencing
- Club: LUGI, Lund
Medal record
Representing Sweden
Olympic Games
Gold medal – first place	1976 Montreal	Team épée
World Championships
Bronze medal – third place	1969 Havana	Team épée
Bronze medal – third place	1971 Vienna	Team épée
Bronze medal – third place	1971 Vienna	Ind. épée
Gold medal – first place	1973 Gothenburg	Ind. épée
Gold medal – first place	1974 Grenoble	Ind. épée
Gold medal – first place	1974 Grenoble	Team épée
Gold medal – first place	1975 Budapest	Team épée
Gold medal – first place	1977 Buenos Aires	Team épée
Silver medal – second place	1977 Buenos Aires	Ind. épée
Bronze medal – third place	1978 Hamburg	Team épée

Rolf Erik Sören Edling (born 30 November 1943) is a retired Swedish épée fencer. He competed at the 1968, 1972, 1976 and 1980 Summer Olympic Games and won a team gold medal at the 1976 Summer Olympic Games in Montreal. His best individual result was fourth place in 1980.

Edling was born in India, where his father was worked for the ASEA company. He then moved to Sweden and started fencing at a boarding school in Sigtuna. Between 1969 and 1978 he won ten medals at the world championships, including five gold medals. In 1973 he was awarded the Svenska Dagbladet Gold Medal.

== Awards ==
- (Sweden) Swedish Fencing Federation Royal Medal of Merit in gold (Svenska fäktförbundets kungliga förtjänstmedalj i guld) (2012)
