= Fencing at the 1976 Summer Olympics – Men's sabre =

Fencing at the Olympics

Men's sabre at the Games of the XXI Olympiad
- Fencing pictogram
- Venue: Winter Stadium
- Dates: 21–22 July 1976
- Competitors: 46 from 18 nations

Medalists
1st place, gold medalist(s)		Viktor Krovopuskov	Soviet Union
2nd place, silver medalist(s)		Vladimir Nazlymov	Soviet Union
3rd place, bronze medalist(s)		Viktor Sidyak	Soviet Union

The men's sabre was one of eight fencing events on the fencing at the 1976 Summer Olympics programme. It was the eighteenth appearance of the event. The competition was held from 21 to 22 July 1976. 46 fencers from 18 nations competed. Nations had been limited to three fencers each since 1928. The event was won by Viktor Krovopuskov of the Soviet Union, the nation's second consecutive victory in the men's sabre. The Soviet Union's two gold medals in the event moved it out of a six-way tie into sole possession of second place all-time, after Hungary with 11. The Soviet team swept the men's sabre medals in 1976, with Vladimir Nazlymov taking silver and Viktor Sidyak bronze. It was the third sweep in the event (Hungary accomplished it in 1912 and 1952). Nazlymov and Sidyak were the eighth and ninth men to win multiple medals in the event. Excluding matches against each other, the three Soviets went 48–3 during the tournament. For the first time since 1900, Hungary competed in the men's sabre but did not win a medal (did not compete in 1904 or 1920, medaled in 1908, 1912, and for eleven straight Games from 1924 to 1972).

== Background ==
This was the 18th appearance of the event, which is the only fencing event to have been held at every Summer Olympics. All six of the finalists from 1972 returned: gold medalist Viktor Sidyak of the Soviet Union, silver medalist Péter Marót of Hungary, bronze medalist Vladimir Nazlymov of the Soviet Union, fourth-place finisher Michele Maffei of Italy, fifth-place finisher Régis Bonissent of France, and sixth-place finisher Tamás Kovács of Hungary. Nazlymov was the reigning (1975) world champion, Mario Aldo Montano of Italy had won the two before him (1973 and 1974). Hungary was no longer the sabre power it once was, having been surpassed by the Soviet Union, though (along with Poland and Italy) continued to be among the perennial contenders.

Paraguay and Thailand each made their debut in the men's sabre. Italy made its 16th appearance in the event, most of any nation, having missed the inaugural 1896 event and the 1904 Olympics.

== Competition format ==
The 1976 tournament returned to a mix of pool and knockout rounds similar to that used in 1968, after the 1972 edition briefly used a pool-only format. The competition included three pool rounds, followed by a double-elimination knockout round, finishing with a final pool round. In each pool round, the fencers competed in a round-robin.

Bouts in the round-robin pools were to 5 touches; bouts in the double-elimination round were to 10 touches. Repechages were not used in the first three rounds, but were used to determine medalists if necessary in the final.

== Schedule ==
All times are Eastern Daylight Time (UTC-4)

Date	Time	Round
Wednesday, 21 July 1976	8:30; 11:00; 13:30	Round 1 Round 2 Round 3
Thursday, 22 July 1976	16:00; 18:00	Elimination rounds Final

== Results ==
=== Round 1 ===
==== Round 1 Pool A ====
Pos	Fencer	W	L	TF	TA	Notes	VN	JN	RB	MM	AHF
1	Vladimir Nazlymov (URS)	4	0	20	5	Q		5–3	5–2	5–0	5–0
2	Józef Nowara (POL)	2	2	15	11	Q	3–5		5–0	2–5	5–1
3	Régis Bonissent (FRA)	2	2	12	11	Q	2–5	0–5		5–1	5–0
4	Marcelo Méndez (ARG)	2	2	11	16	Q	0–5	5–2	1–5		5–4
5	Abdul Hamid Fathi (IRI)	0	4	5	20		0–5	1–5	0–5	4–5	

Source: Official Report, vol. 3, p. 231

==== Round 1 Pool B ====
Pos	Fencer	W	L	TF	TA	Notes	AM	JB	PA	JD	AE
1	Anani Mikhaylov (BUL)	3	1	18	11	Q		3–5	5–4	5–1	5–1
2	Jacek Bierkowski (POL)	3	1	18	14	Q	5–3		5–4	3–5	5–2
3	Paul Apostol (USA)	2	2	18	17	Q	4–5	4–5		5–4	5–3
4	John Deanfield (GBR)	1	3	14	18	Q	1–5	5–3	4–5		4–5
5	Ahmed Eskandarpour (IRI)	1	3	11	19		1–5	2–5	3–5	5–4	

Source: Official Report, vol. 3, p. 231

==== Round 1 Pool C ====
Pos	Fencer	W	L	TF	TA	Notes	IP	PW	PMar	PMat	JG
1	Ioan Pop (ROU)	4	0	20	3	Q		5–2	5–1	5–0	5–0
2	Peter Westbrook (USA)	3	1	17	12	Q	2–5		5–4	5–1	5–2
3	Péter Marót (HUN)	2	2	15	15	Q	1–5	4–5		5–3	5–2
4	Peter Mather (GBR)	1	3	9	17	Q	0–5	1–5	3–5		5–2
5	Juan Gavajda (ARG)	0	4	6	20		0–5	2–5	2–5	2–5	

Source: Official Report, vol. 3, p. 231

==== Round 1 Pool D ====
Pos	Fencer	W	L	TF	TA	Notes	IG	CM	LJ	ML	KR
1	Imre Gedővári (HUN)	4	0	20	7	Q		5–3	5–4	5–0	5–0
2	Cornel Marin (ROU)	3	1	18	9	Q	3–5		5–2	5–2	5–0
3	Leszek Jabłonowski (POL)	2	2	16	14	Q	4–5	2–5		5–3	5–1
4	Marc Lavoie (CAN)	1	3	10	15	Q	0–5	2–5	3–5		5–0
5	Kam Roger (HKG)	0	4	1	20		0–5	0–5	1–5	0–5	

Source: Official Report, vol. 3, p. 231

==== Round 1 Pool E ====
Pos	Fencer	W	L	TF	TA	Notes	VK	TK	GS	ES	JMC
1	Viktor Krovopuskov (URS)	3	1	19	8	Q		5–2	4–5	5–1	5–0
2	Tamás Kovács (HUN)	3	1	17	10	Q	2–5		5–1	5–2	5–2
3	Guzman Salazar (CUB)	3	1	16	10	Q	5–4	1–5		5–0	5–1
4	Eli Sukunda (CAN)	1	3	8	19	Q	1–5	2–5	0–5		5–4
5	José María Casanovas (ARG)	0	4	7	20		0–5	2–5	1–5	4–5	

Source: Official Report, vol. 3, p. 231

==== Round 1 Pool F ====
Pos	Fencer	W	L	TF	TA	Notes	MM	MO	SK	IPA	HB
1	Michele Maffei (ITA)	4	0	20	6	Q		5–1	5–3	5–2	5–0
2	Manuel Ortiz (CUB)	3	1	16	12	Q	1–5		5–3	5–1	5–3
3	Stephen Kaplan (USA)	2	2	16	15	Q	3–5	3–5		5–2	5–3
4	Ismail Pashapour-Alamdari (IRI)	1	3	10	16	Q	2–5	1–5	2–5		5–1
5	Hanns Brandstätter (AUT)	0	4	7	20		0–5	3–5	3–5	1–5	

Source: Official Report, vol. 3, p. 231

==== Round 1 Pool G ====
Pos	Fencer	W	L	TF	TA	Notes	VS	AA	PQ	PU	RS
1	Viktor Sidyak (URS)	4	0	20	6	Q		5–4	5–0	5–2	5–0
2	Angelo Arcidiacono (ITA)	3	1	19	12	Q	4–5		5–2	5–4	5–1
3	Patrick Quivrin (FRA)	2	2	12	15	Q	0–5	2–5		5–4	5–1
4	Peter Urban (CAN)	1	3	15	16	Q	2–5	4–5	4–5		5–1
5	Royengyot Srivorapongpant (THA)	0	4	3	20		0–5	1–5	1–5	1–5	

Source: Official Report, vol. 3, p. 231

==== Round 1 Pool H ====
Pos	Fencer	W	L	TF	TA	Notes	MAM	RC	FdlT	MD	SS
1	Mario Aldo Montano (ITA)	4	0	20	6	Q		5–4	5–2	5–0	5–0
2	Richard Cohen (GBR)	3	1	19	12	Q	4–5		5–3	5–2	5–2
3	Francisco de la Torre (CUB)	2	2	15	15	Q	2–5	3–5		5–4	5–1
4	Miroslav Dudekov (BUL)	1	3	11	16	Q	0–5	2–5	4–5		5–1
5	Sutipong Santitevagul (THA)	0	4	4	20		0–5	2–5	1–5	1–5	

Source: Official Report, vol. 3, p. 231

==== Round 1 Pool I ====
Pos	Fencer	W	L	TF	TA	Notes	DI	PB	TW	TH	TD	CB
1	Dan Irimiciuc (ROU)	5	0	25	10	Q		5–2	5–3	5–2	5–1	5–2
2	Philippe Bena (FRA)	4	1	22	13	Q	2–5		5–4	5–0	5–2	5–2
3	Tycho Weißgerber (FRG)	3	2	22	17	Q	3–5	4–5		5–3	5–4	5–0
4	Taweewat Hurapan (THA)	1	4	14	23	Q	2–5	0–5	3–5		5–3	4–5
5	Trayan Dimitrov (BUL)	1	4	15	24		1–5	2–5	4–5	3–5		5–4
6	César Bejarano (PAR)	1	4	13	24		2–5	2–5	0–5	5–4	4–5	

Source: Official Report, vol. 3, p. 231

=== Round 2 ===
==== Round 2 Pool A ====
Pos	Fencer	W	L	TF	TA	Notes	FdlT	IP	AM	PA	RC	TH
1	Francisco de la Torre (CUB)	5	0	25	11	Q		5–3	5–1	5–1	5–3	5–3
2	Ioan Pop (ROU)	4	1	23	14	Q	3–5		5–4	5–2	5–1	5–2
3	Anani Mikhaylov (BUL)	3	2	20	19	Q	1–5	4–5		5–4	5–4	5–1
4	Paul Apostol (USA)	2	3	17	19	Q	1–5	2–5	4–5		5–3	5–1
5	Richard Cohen (GBR)	1	4	16	21		3–5	1–5	4–5	3–5		5–1
6	Taweewat Hurapan (THA)	0	5	8	25		3–5	2–5	1–5	1–5	1–5	

Source: Official Report, vol. 3, p. 233

==== Round 2 Pool B ====
Pos	Fencer	W	L	TF	TA	Notes	AA	VN	TK	PQ	SK	ES
1	Angelo Arcidiacono (ITA)	4	1	24	13	Q		5–3	5–2	4–5	5–3	5–0
2	Vladimir Nazlymov (URS)	4	1	23	15	Q	3–5		5–4	5–3	5–2	5–1
3	Tamás Kovács (HUN)	3	2	21	17	Q	2–5	4–5		5–2	5–3	5–2
4	Patrick Quivrin (FRA)	3	2	20	19	Q	5–4	3–5	2–5		5–3	5–2
5	Stephen Kaplan (USA)	1	4	16	24		3–5	2–5	3–5	3–5		5–4
6	Eli Sukunda (CAN)	0	5	9	25		0–5	1–5	2–5	2–5	4–5	

Source: Official Report, vol. 3, p. 233

==== Round 2 Pool C ====
Pos	Fencer	W	L	TF	TA	Notes	VK	DI	PMar	RB	GS	PMat
1	Viktor Krovopuskov (URS)	5	0	25	10	Q		5–3	5–3	5–0	5–2	5–2
2	Dan Irimiciuc (ROU)	4	1	23	13	Q	3–5		5–3	5–2	5–2	5–1
3	Péter Marót (HUN)	2	3	20	18	Q	3–5	3–5		4–5	5–1	5–2
4	Régis Bonissent (FRA)	2	3	16	19	Q	0–5	2–5	5–4		4–5	5–0
5	Guzman Salazar (CUB)	2	3	15	20		2–5	2–5	1–5	5–4		5–1
6	Peter Mather (GBR)	0	5	6	25		2–5	1–5	2–5	0–5	1–5	

Source: Official Report, vol. 3, p. 233

==== Round 2 Pool D ====
Pos	Fencer	W	L	TF	TA	Notes	VS	PW	CM	LJ	MM	IPA
1	Viktor Sidyak (URS)	5	0	25	8	Q		5–2	5–4	5–2	5–0	5–0
2	Peter Westbrook (USA)	3	2	21	14	Q	2–5		5–2	4–5	5–1	5–1
3	Cornel Marin (ROU)	3	2	21	17	Q	4–5	2–5		5–4	5–0	5–3
4	Leszek Jabłonowski (POL)	2	3	19	21	Q	2–5	5–4	4–5		3–5	5–2
5	Marcelo Méndez (ARG)	2	3	11	18		0–5	1–5	0–5	5–3		5–0
6	Ismail Pashapour-Alamdari (IRI)	0	5	6	25		0–5	1–5	3–5	2–5	0–5	

Source: Official Report, vol. 3, p. 233

==== Round 2 Pool E ====
Pos	Fencer	W	L	TF	TA	Notes	MO	MM	JN	MD	PB	PU
1	Manuel Ortiz (CUB)	5	0	25	9	Q		5–1	5–4	5–2	5–2	5–0
2	Michele Maffei (ITA)	4	1	21	10	Q	1–5		5–1	5–1	5–2	5–1
3	Józef Nowara (POL)	3	2	20	17	Q	4–5	1–5		5–3	5–3	5–1
4	Miroslav Dudekov (BUL)	2	3	16	15	Q	2–5	1–5	3–5		5–0	5–0
5	Philippe Bena (FRA)	1	4	12	24		2–5	2–5	3–5	0–5		5–4
6	Peter Urban (CAN)	0	5	6	25		0–5	1–5	1–5	0–5	4–5	

Source: Official Report, vol. 3, p. 233

==== Round 2 Pool F ====
Pos	Fencer	W	L	TF	TA	Notes	MAM	IG	JB	TW	ML	JD
1	Mario Aldo Montano (ITA)	5	0	25	12	Q		5–4	5–4	5–2	5–1	5–1
2	Imre Gedővári (HUN)	4	1	24	16	Q	4–5		5–4	5–4	5–1	5–2
3	Jacek Bierkowski (POL)	3	2	23	14	Q	4–5	4–5		5–1	5–1	5–2
4	Tycho Weißgerber (FRG)	2	3	17	21	Q	2–5	4–5	1–5		5–3	5–3
5	Marc Lavoie (CAN)	1	4	11	24		1–5	1–5	1–5	3–5		5–4
6	John Deanfield (GBR)	0	5	12	25		1–5	2–5	2–5	3–5	4–5	

Source: Official Report, vol. 3, p. 233

=== Round 3 ===
==== Round 3 Pool A ====
Pos	Fencer	W	L	TF	TA	Notes	VS	IG	DI	PQ	TW	AM
1	Viktor Sidyak (URS)	4	1	23	15	Q		5–2	5–4	3–5	5–3	5–1
2	Imre Gedővári (HUN)	4	1	22	16	Q	2–5		5–4	5–2	5–3	5–2
3	Dan Irimiciuc (ROU)	3	2	23	13	Q	4–5	4–5		5–2	5–1	5–0
4	Patrick Quivrin (FRA)	2	3	17	21	Q	5–3	2–5	2–5		5–3	3–5
5	Tycho Weißgerber (FRG)	1	4	15	24		3–5	3–5	1–5	3–5		5–4
6	Anani Mikhaylov (BUL)	1	4	12	23		1–5	2–5	0–5	5–3	4–5	

Source: Official Report, vol. 3, p. 235

==== Round 3 Pool B ====
Pos	Fencer	W	L	TF	TA	Notes	IP	AA	JN	MO	PM	RB
1	Ioan Pop (ROU)	4	1	22	18	Q		2–5	5–4	5–4	5–4	5–1
2	Angelo Arcidiacono (ITA)	3	2	21	18	Q	5–2		4–5	5–2	5–4	2–5
3	Józef Nowara (POL)	2	3	21	21	Q	4–5	5–4		3–5	4–5	5–2
4	Manuel Ortiz (CUB)	2	3	19	21	Q	4–5	2–5	5–3		5–3	3–5
5	Péter Marót (HUN)	2	3	21	23		4–5	4–5	5–4	3–5		5–4
6	Régis Bonissent (FRA)	2	3	17	20		1–5	5–2	2–5	5–3	4–5	

Source: Official Report, vol. 3, p. 235

==== Round 3 Pool C ====
Pos	Fencer	W	L	TF	TA	Notes	VK	MM	JB	PA	TK	CM
1	Viktor Krovopuskov (URS)	5	0	25	13	Q		5–4	5–0	5–3	5–4	5–2
2	Michele Maffei (ITA)	3	2	22	16	Q	4–5		3–5	5–3	5–3	5–0
3	Jacek Bierkowski (POL)	3	2	18	21	Q	0–5	5–3		5–4	3–5	5–4
4	Paul Apostol (USA)	2	3	20	20	Q	3–5	3–5	4–5		5–2	5–3
5	Tamás Kovács (HUN)	2	3	19	21		4–5	3–5	5–3	2–5		5–3
6	Cornel Marin (ROU)	0	5	12	25		2–5	0–5	4–5	3–5	3–5	

Source: Official Report, vol. 3, p. 235

==== Round 3 Pool D ====
Pos	Fencer	W	L	TF	TA	Notes	VN	MAM	FdlT	PW	MD	LJ
1	Vladimir Nazlymov (URS)	5	0	25	14	Q		5–4	5–4	5–2	5–2	5–2
2	Mario Aldo Montano (ITA)	4	1	24	10	Q	4–5		5–2	5–0	5–1	5–2
3	Francisco de la Torre (CUB)	3	2	21	15	Q	4–5	2–5		5–1	5–2	5–2
4	Peter Westbrook (USA)	2	3	13	22	Q	2–5	0–5	1–5		5–3	5–4
5	Miroslav Dudekov (BUL)	1	4	13	23		2–5	1–5	2–5	3–5		5–3
6	Leszek Jabłonowski (POL)	0	5	13	25		2–5	2–5	2–5	4–5	3–5	

Source: Official Report, vol. 3, p. 235

=== Double elimination rounds ===
==== Winners brackets ====
===== Winners group 1 =====
Round of 16		Round of 8
Viktor Krovopuskov (URS)	10
Paul Apostol (USA)	4	Viktor Krovopuskov (URS)	10
Michele Maffei (ITA)	10	Michele Maffei (ITA)	9
Dan Irimiciuc (ROU)	7

===== Winners group 2 =====
Round of 16		Round of 8
Francisco de la Torre (CUB)	10
Jacek Bierkowski (POL)	7	Francisco de la Torre (CUB)	7
Peter Westbrook (USA)	4	Vladimir Nazlymov (URS)	10
Vladimir Nazlymov (URS)	10

===== Winners group 3 =====
Round of 16		Round of 8
Viktor Sidyak (URS)	10
Józef Nowara (POL)	7	Viktor Sidyak (URS)	10
Angelo Arcidiacono (ITA)	3	Imre Gedővári (HUN)	6
Imre Gedővári (HUN)	10

===== Winners group 4 =====
Round of 16		Round of 8
Ioan Pop (ROU)	7
Manuel Ortiz (CUB)	10	Manuel Ortiz (CUB)	5
Patrick Quivrin (FRA)	1	Mario Aldo Montano (ITA)	10
Mario Aldo Montano (ITA)	10

==== Losers brackets ====
===== Losers group 1 =====
Round of 4
Paul Apostol (USA)	6
Dan Irimiciuc (ROU)	10
Józef Nowara (POL)	6
Angelo Arcidiacono (ITA)	10

Round of 4
Dan Irimiciuc (ROU)	9
Michele Maffei (ITA)	10
Angelo Arcidiacono (ITA)	7
Imre Gedővári (HUN)	10

Round of 2
Michele Maffei (ITA)	10
Imre Gedővári (HUN)	3

===== Losers group 2 =====
Round of 4
Jacek Bierkowski (POL)	10
Peter Westbrook (USA)	8
Ioan Pop (ROU)	10
Patrick Quivrin (FRA)	9

Round of 4
Jacek Bierkowski (POL)	9
Francisco de la Torre (CUB)	10
Ioan Pop (ROU)	10
Manuel Ortiz (CUB)	7

Round of 2
Francisco de la Torre (CUB)	5
Ioan Pop (ROU)	10

=== Final round ===
Pos	Fencer	W	L	TF	TA	VK	VN	VS	IP	MAM	MM
1st place, gold medalist(s)	Viktor Krovopuskov (URS)	5	0	25	14		5–3	5–4	5–3	5–2	5–2
2nd place, silver medalist(s)	Vladimir Nazlymov (URS)	4	1	23	18	3–5		5–3	5–3	5–4	5–3
3rd place, bronze medalist(s)	Viktor Sidyak (URS)	3	2	22	20	4–5	3–5		5–3	5–3	5–4
4	Ioan Pop (ROU)	2	3	19	20	3–5	3–5	3–5		5–2	5–3
5	Mario Aldo Montano (ITA)	1	4	16	21	2–5	4–5	3–5	2–5		5–1
6	Michele Maffei (ITA)	0	5	13	25	2–5	3–5	4–5	3–5	1–5	

Source: Official Report, vol. 3, p. 236

== Final classification ==
Fencer	Nation
Viktor Krovopuskov	Soviet Union
Vladimir Nazlymov	Soviet Union
Viktor Sidyak	Soviet Union
Ioan Pop	Romania
Mario Aldo Montano	Italy
Michele Maffei	Italy
Francisco de la Torre	Cuba
Imre Gedővári	Hungary
Jacek Bierkowski	Poland
Manuel Ortiz	Cuba
Dan Irimiciuc	Romania
Angelo Arcidiacono	Italy
Paul Apostol	United States
Peter Westbrook	United States
Józef Nowara	Poland
Patrick Quivrin	France
Tamás Kovács	Hungary
Péter Marót	Hungary
Régis Bonissent	France
Tycho Weißgerber	West Germany
Miroslav Dudekov	Bulgaria
Anani Mikhaylov	Bulgaria
Leszek Jabłonowski	Poland
Cornel Marin	Romania
Guzman Salazar	Cuba
Marcelo Méndez	Argentina
Richard Cohen	Great Britain
Stephen Kaplan	United States
Philippe Bena	France
Marc Lavoie	Canada
John Deanfield	Great Britain
Eli Sukunda	Canada
Taweewat Hurapan	Thailand
Peter Mather	Great Britain
Ismail Pashapour-Alamdari	Iran
Peter Urban	Canada
Ahmed Eskandarpour	Iran
Trayan Dimitrov	Bulgaria
César Bejarano	Paraguay
José María Casanovas	Argentina
Hanns Brandstätter	Austria
Juan Gavajda	Argentina
Abdul Hamid Fathi	Iran
Sutipong Santitevagul	Thailand
Royengyot Srivorapongpant	Thailand
Kam Roger	Hong Kong
