= Fencing at the 1976 Summer Olympics – Men's team sabre =

Men's team sabre at the Games of the XXI Olympiad
- Venue: University of Montréal
- Dates: July 26 – 27, 1976
- Competitors: 63 from 14 nations

Medalists
1st place, gold medalist(s)		Viktor Sidyak; Vladimir Nazlymov; Viktor Krovopuskov; Mikhail Burtsev; Eduard Vinokurov	Soviet Union
2nd place, silver medalist(s)		Mario Aldo Montano; Mario Tullio Montano; Michele Maffei; Tommaso Montano; Angelo Arcidiacono	Italy
3rd place, bronze medalist(s)		Dan Irimiciuc; Ioan Pop; Marin Mustață; Cornel Marin; Alexandru Nilca	Romania

The men's team sabre was one of eight fencing events on the fencing at the 1976 Summer Olympics programme. It was the fifteenth appearance of the event. The competition was held from July 26 to 27, 1976. 63 fencers from 14 nations competed.

== Rosters ==
Argentina
- Marcelo Méndez
- Juan Gavajda
- Fernando Lupiz
- José María Casanovas

Bulgaria
- Miroslav Dudekov
- Anani Mikhaylov
- Konstantin Dzhelepov
- Khristo Khristov

Canada
- Marc Lavoie
- Peter Urban
- Imre Nagy
- Eli Sukunda

Cuba
- Manuel Ortiz
- Francisco de la Torre
- Guzman Salazar
- Ramón Hernández
- Lazaro Mora

France
- Philippe Bena
- Régis Bonissent
- Bernard Dumont
- Didier Flament
- Patrick Quivrin

Great Britain
- Bill Hoskyns
- Peter Mather
- John Deanfield
- Richard Cohen

Hungary
- Péter Marót
- Tamás Kovács
- Imre Gedővári
- Ferenc Hammang
- Csaba Körmöczi

Iran
- Abdul Hamid Fathi
- Ahmed Eskandarpour
- Ahmed Akbari
- Ismail Pashapour-Alamdari

Italy
- Mario Aldo Montano
- Mario Tullio Montano
- Michele Maffei
- Tommaso Montano
- Angelo Arcidiacono

Poland
- Leszek Jabłonowski
- Sylwester Królikowski
- Jacek Bierkowski
- Józef Nowara

Romania
- Dan Irimiciuc
- Ioan Pop
- Marin Mustață
- Cornel Marin
- Alexandru Nilca

Soviet Union
- Viktor Sidyak
- Vladimir Nazlymov
- Viktor Krovopuskov
- Mikhail Burtsev
- Eduard Vinokurov

Thailand
- Taweewat Hurapan
- Samachai Trangjaroenngarm
- Sutipong Santitevagul
- Royengyot Srivorapongpant

United States
- Paul Apostol
- Peter Westbrook
- Stephen Kaplan
- Thomas Losonczy
- Alex Orban

== Results ==
=== Round 1 ===
==== Round 1 Pool A ====
France and the Soviet Union each defeated Bulgaria, 11–5. The two victors then faced off. The Soviet Union won 9–1.

Pos	Team	W	L	BW	BL	Qual.	URS	FRA	BUL
1	Soviet Union	2	0	20	6	QQ		9–1	11–5
2	France	1	1	12	14	QQ	1–9		11–5
3	Bulgaria	0	2	10	22		5–11	5–11	

Source: Official Report, vol. 3, p. 255

==== Round 1 Pool B ====
The United States and Italy each defeated Canada, 9–7 and 13–3, respectively. The two victors then faced off. Italy won 9–3.

Pos	Team	W	L	BW	BL	Qual.	ITA	USA	CAN
1	Italy	2	0	22	6	QQ		9–3	13–3
2	United States	1	1	12	16	QQ	3–9		9–7
3	Canada	0	2	10	22		3–13	7–9	

Source: Official Report, vol. 3, p. 255

==== Round 1 Pool C ====
The first two rounds of matches left Romania and Cuba at 2–0 apiece (advancing to the knockout rounds) and Great Britain and Thailand at 0–2 each (eliminating them). Romania defeated Cuba 9–3 to take the top spot in the group. Great Britain and Thailand did not face each other.

Pos	Team	W	L	BW	BL	Qual.	ROU	CUB	GBR	THA
1	Romania	3	0	39	5	QQ		9–3	14–2	16–0
2	Cuba	2	1	29	15	QQ	3–9		11–5	15–1
3	Great Britain	0	2	7	25		2–14	5–11		
4	Thailand	0	2	1	31		0–16	1–15		

Source: Official Report, vol. 3, p. 256

==== Round 1 Pool D ====
The first two rounds of matches left Hungary and Poland at 2–0 apiece (advancing to the knockout rounds) and Argentina and Iran at 0–2 each (eliminating them). Hungary defeated Poland 8–6 (with a 58–46 touches advantage making the final two bouts unnecessary) to take the top spot in the group. Argentina defeated Iran 9–4 for third place.

Pos	Team	W	L	BW	BL	Qual.	HUN	POL	ARG	IRI
1	Hungary	3	0	36	10	QQ		8–6	14–2	14–2
2	Poland	2	1	25	21	QQ	6–8		10–6	9–7
3	Argentina	0	2	17	28		2–14	6–10		9–4
4	Iran	0	2	13	32		2–14	7–9	4–9	

Source: Official Report, vol. 3, pp. 256–57

=== Elimination rounds ===
Quarterfinals
A1	Soviet Union	9
B2	United States	1
C1	Romania	9
D2	Poland	4
D1	Hungary	8
C2	Cuba	7
B1	Italy	9
A2	France	2

Semifinals
A1	Soviet Union	8 (65)
C1	Romania	8 (64)
D1	Hungary	5
B1	Italy	9

Final
A1	Soviet Union	9
B1	Italy	4
Third place
C1	Romania	9
D1	Hungary	4

Consolation Round
B2	United States	3
D2	Poland	9
C2	Cuba	9
A2	France	5

Fifth Place
D2	Poland	6
C2	Cuba	9
