= Poland at the 1976 Summer Olympics =

- IOC code: POL
- NOC: Polish Olympic Committee

in Montreal, Canada July 17, 1976 – August 1, 1976
- Competitors: 207 (180 men and 27 women) in 18 sports
- Flag bearer: Grzegorz Śledziewski
- Medals Ranked 6th: Gold 7 Silver 6 Bronze 13 Total 26

Summer Olympics appearances (overview)
- 1924; 1928; 1932; 1936; 1948; 1952; 1956; 1960; 1964; 1968; 1972; 1976; 1980; 1984; 1988; 1992; 1996; 2000; 2004; 2008; 2012; 2016; 2020; 2024

Other related appearances
- Russian Empire (1900, 1912); Austria (1908–1912)

Poland competed at the 1976 Summer Olympics in Montreal, Quebec, Canada. 207 competitors, 180 men and 27 women, took part in 116 events in 18 sports.

== Medalists ==
=== Gold ===
- Irena Szewińska — Athletics, Women's 400 metres
- Jacek Wszoła — Athletics, Men's High Jump
- Tadeusz Ślusarski — Athletics, Men's Pole Vault
- Jerzy Rybicki — Boxing, Men's Light-Middleweight (67–71 kg)
- Janusz Pyciak-Peciak — Modern Pentathlon, individual
- Włodzimierz Stefański, Bronislaw Bebel, Lech Łasko, Edward Skorek, Tomasz Wójtowicz, Wiesław Gawłowski, Mirosław Rybaczewski, Zbigniew Lubiejewski, Ryszard Bosek, Włodzimierz Sadalski, Zbigniew Zarzycki, Marek Karbarz, and Hubert Wagner (as coach); Volleyball, Men's Team Competition
- Kazimierz Lipień — Wrestling, Men's Greco-Roman (57–62 kg)

=== Silver ===
- Bronisław Malinowski — Athletics, Men's 3.000m Steeplechase
- Zbigniew Jaremski, Andrej Kupczyk, Ryszard Podlas, and Jan Werner — Athletics, 4 × 400 m relay men
- Tadeusz Mytnik, Mieczysław Nowicki, Stanisław Szozda, and Ryszard Szurkowski — Cycling Road, Men's Team Time Trial
- Andrzej Gronowicz and Jerzy Opara — Canoe / Kayak, Men's Flatwater C-2 500 m (canoe double)
- Jan Benigier, Lesław Ćmikiewicz, Kazimierz Deyna, Jerzy Gorgoń, Henryk Kasperczak, Kazimierz Kmiecik, Grzegorz Lato, Zygmunt Maszczyk, Piotr Mowlik, Roman Ogaza, Wojciech Rudy, Andrzej Szarmach, Antoni Szymanowski, Jan Tomaszewski, Henryk Wawrowski, Henryk Wieczorek, and Władysław Żmuda — Football, Men's Team Competition
- Grzegorz Cziura — Weightlifting, Men's Bantamweight

=== Bronze ===
- Leszek Błażyński — Boxing, Men's Flyweight (48–51 kg)
- Leszek Kosedowski — Boxing, Men's Featherweight (54–57 kg)
- Kazimierz Szczerba — Boxing, Men's Light-Welterweight (60–63.5 kg)
- Janusz Gortat — Boxing, Men's Light-Heavyweight (75–81 kg)
- Mieczysław Nowicki — Cycling, Men's Individual Road Race
- Zdzisław Antczak, Janusz Brzozowski, Piotr Cieśla, Jan Gmyrek, Alfred Kałuziński, Jerzy Klempel, Zygfryd Kuchta, Jerzy Melcer, Ryszard Przybysz, Henryk Rozmiarek, Andrzej Sokołowski, Andrzej Szymczak, Mieczysław Wojczak, and Włodzimierz Zieliński — Handball, Men's Team Competition
- Marian Tałaj — Judo, Men's Half-Middleweight (63–70 kg)
- Wiesław Gawlikowski — Shooting, skeet (125 targets) Mixed
- Jerzy Greszkiewicz — Shooting, 50 m running target (30+30 shots) Mixed
- Kazimierz Czarnecki — Weightlifting, 60–67.5 kg, total (lightweight)
- Tadeusz Rutkowski — Weightlifting, 91–110 kg, total (heavyweight) Men
- Czesław Kwieciński — Wrestling Greco-Roman, 82–90 kg (light-heavyweight)
- Andrzej Skrzydlewski — Wrestling Greco-Roman, 90–100 kg (heavyweight)

== Archery ==
Poland entered two women and two men in the archery competition. It was the second time that Poland had sent archers to the Olympics. After winning a silver medal in the women's competition in 1972, Poland's best finisher in 1976 was Jadwiga Wilejto at 6th place. Both of the Polish men, however, improved considerably on the best male competitor of four years before. Poland placed eighth on the national leaderboard for archery.

Men

Athlete	Event	Round 1		Round 2		Total score	
Athlete	Event	Score	Seed	Score	Seed	Score	Seed
Jan Popowicz	Individual	1154	22	1201	20	2355	17
Wojciech Szymańczyk	Individual	1137	25	1209	16	2346	22

Women

Athlete	Event	Round 1		Round 2		Total score	
Athlete	Event	Score	Seed	Score	Seed	Score	Seed
Jadwiga Wilejto	Individual	1200	4	1195	9	2395	6
Irena Szydłowska	Individual	1127	8	1137	18	2264	20

== Athletics ==
Men
Track & road events

Athlete	Event	Heat		Quarterfinal		Semifinal		Final	
Athlete	Event	Result	Rank	Result	Rank	Result	Rank	Result	Rank
Bogusław Duda	20 km walk	—N/a						1:33:53.4	21
Marian Gęsicki	800 m	1:47.06	6	did not advance					
Bogdan Grzejszczak	200 m	21.35	2 Q	21.02	2 Q	21.14	4 Q	20.91	6
Jerzy Hewelt	400 m hurdles	51.39	3 Q	—N/a		50.57	7	did not advance	
Zbigniew Jaremski	400 m	46.68	3 Q	47.10	6	did not advance			
Zenon Licznerski	100 m	10.60	2 Q	10.52	6	did not advance			
Bronisław Malinowski	1500 m	3:41.67	6	did not advance					
Bronisław Malinowski	3000 m steeplechase	8:18.56	1 Q	—N/a				8:09.11	Silver medal
Zenon Nowosz	200 m	21.29	2 Q	21.22	6	did not advance			
Kazimierz Orzeł	Marathon	—N/a						2:17:43	15
Jan Ornoch	20 km walk	—N/a						1:32:19.2	17
Jerzy Pietrzyk	400 m	46.92	2 Q	46.30	3 Q	45.65	5	did not advance	
Andrzej Świerczyński	100 m	10.62	2 Q	10.59	5	did not advance			
Jan Werner	400 m	46.19	3 Q	45.88	2 Q	45.44	4 Q	45.63	8
Marian Woronin	100 m	10.56	2 Q	10.53	4 Q	10.69	8	did not advance	
Marian Woronin	200 m	21.90	5	did not advance					
Andrzej Świerczyński; Marian Woronin; Bogdan Grzejszczak; Zenon Licznerski	4 × 100 m relay	39.09	1 Q	—N/a				38.83	4
Ryszard Podlas; Jan Werner; Zbigniew Jaremski; Jerzy Pietrzyk	4 × 400 m relay	3:03.03	1 Q	—N/a				3:01.43	Silver medal

Field events

Athlete	Event	Qualification		Final	
Athlete	Event	Distance	Position	Distance	Position
Piotr Bielczyk	Javelin throw	82.56	7 q	86.50	4
Eugeniusz Biskupski	Triple jump	16.46	9 Q	16.49	7
Wojciech Buciarski	Pole vault	5.10	1 Q	5.45	5
Grzegorz Cybulski	Long jump	7.71	13	did not advance	
Michał Joachimowski	Triple jump	16.29	13	did not advance	
Władysław Kozakiewicz	Pole vault	5.10	1 Q	5.25	11
Andrzej Sontag	Triple jump	15.82	20	did not advance	
Tadeusz Ślusarski	Pole vault	5.10	16 Q	5.50 OR	Gold medal
Stanisław Wołodko	Discus throw	59.42	18	did not advance	
Jacek Wszoła	High jump	2.16	1 Q	2.25 OR	Gold medal

Combined events – Decathlon

Athlete	Event	100 m	LJ	SP	HJ	400 m	100H	DT	PV	JT	1500 m	Final	Rank
Ryszard Katus	Result	11.06	7.04	13.48	1.84	49.87	14.51	42.28	4.50	57.54	4:47.00	7616	12
Ryszard Katus	Points	790	828	695	716	810	902	730	932	731	482	7616	12
Ryszard Skowronek	Result	11.02	7.26	13.74	1.91	47.91	14.75	45.34	4.80	62.22	4:29.89	8113	5
Ryszard Skowronek	Points	799	873	712	779	903	876	788	1005	788	590	8113	5

Women
Track & road events

Athlete	Event	Heat		Quarterfinal		Semifinal		Final	
Athlete	Event	Result	Rank	Result	Rank	Result	Rank	Result	Rank
Bożena Nowakowska	100 m hurdles	13.05	1 Q	—N/a		13.04	5	did not advance	
Grażyna Rabsztyn	100 m hurdles	13.09	2 Q	—N/a		13.35	2 Q	12.96	5
Irena Szewińska	400 m	52.75	3 Q	52.00	4 Q	50.48 OR	1 Q	49.29 WR	Gold medal

Field events

Athlete	Event	Qualification		Final	
Athlete	Event	Distance	Position	Distance	Position
Danuta Rosani	Discus throw	~~57.78~~	~~11 q~~	DSQ*	

Results have been removed due to her disqualification for using anabolic steroids, the first case of such a disqualification in the sport at the Olympics.

== Boxing ==
Men

Athlete	Event	1 Round	2 Round	3 Round	Quarterfinals	Semifinals	Final	
Athlete	Event	Opposition Result	Opposition Result	Opposition Result	Opposition Result	Opposition Result	Opposition Result	Rank
Henryk Średnicki	Light Flyweight	Louis Curtis (USA); W 5-0	Li Byong-Uk (PRK); L 2:3	did not advance				
Leszek Blażyński	Flyweight	BYE	Antônio Toledo Filho (BRA); W KO-2	Fazlija Šaćirović (YUG); W 3-2	Alfredo Pérez (VEN); W 3-2	Leo Randolph (USA); L 1-4	Did not advance	Bronze medal
Leszek Borkowski	Bantamweight	BYE	Patrick Cowdell (GBR); L 0-5	did not advance				
Leszek Kosedowski	Featherweight	BYE	Cornelius Boza Edwards (UGA); W WO	Camille Huard (CAN); W 5-0	Bratislav Ristić (YUG); W 5-0	Richard Nowakowski (GDR); L 0-5	Did not advance	Bronze medal
Bogdan Gajda	Lightweight	BYE	Cleveland Denny (GUY); W WO	Vassily Solomin (URS); L 0-5	did not advance			
Kazimierz Szczerba	Light Welterweight	BYE	Josiah Nhlengethwa (SWZ); W WO	Sodnomyn Gombo (MGL); W 3-2	Luis Portillo (ARG); W 5-0	Ray Leonard (USA); L 0-5	Did not advance	Bronze medal
Zbigniew Kicka	Welterweight	BYE	Clinton Jackson (USA); W 0-5	did not advance				
Jerzy Rybicki	Light Middleweight	BYE	Chuck Walker (USA); W 3-2	—N/a	Wilfredo Guzmán (PUR); W 5-0	Viktor Savchenko (URS); W 3-2	Tadija Kačar (YUG); W5-0	Gold medal
Ryszard Pasiewicz	Middleweight	BYE	Jean-Pierre Malavasi (FRA); W KO-2	—N/a	Michael Spinks (USA); L 0-5	did not advance		
Janusz Gortat	Light Heavyweight	Miloslav Popović (YUG); W 3-2	Georgi Stoymenov (BUL); W AB-3	—N/a	Juan Domingo Suárez (ARG); W 4-1	Leon Spinks (USA); L 0-5	Did not advance	Bronze medal
Andrzej Biegalski	Heavyweight	John Tate (USA); L 0-5	did not advance					

== Canoeing ==
=== Sprint ===
Men

Athlete	Event	Heats		Repechages		Semifinals		Final	
Athlete	Event	Time	Rank	Time	Rank	Time	Rank	Time	Rank
Ryszard Kosiński	C-1 500 m	2:16.60	6 R	2:08.06	3 Q	2:12.71	4	did not advance	
Jerzy Opara; Andrzej Gronowicz	C-2 500 m	1:58.90	3 Q	BYE		1:49.04	1 Q	1:47.77	Silver medal
Jerzy Opara; Andrzej Gronowicz	C-2 1000 m	3:52.58	1 Q	BYE		3:59.34	1 Q	3:59.56	4
Grzegorz Śledziewski	K-1 500 m	1:54.27	1 Q	BYE		1:52.39	1 Q	1:48.49	5
Grzegorz Śledziewski	K-1 1000 m	3:55.76	2 Q	BYE		3:46.88	1 Q	3:54.29	8
Ryszard Oborski; Grzegorz Śledziewski	K-2 500 m	1:46.31	6 R	1:47.30	2 Q	1:41.65	4	did not advance	
Ryszard Tylewski; Daniel Wełna	K-2 1000 m	3:36.57	3 Q	BYE		3:29.07	4	did not advance	
Henryk Budzicz; Kazimierz Górecki; Grzegorz Kołtan; Ryszard Oborski	K-4 1000 m	3:07.91	2 Q	BYE		3:13.62	3 Q	3:12.17	5

Women

Athlete	Event	Heats		Repechages		Semifinals		Final	
Athlete	Event	Time	Rank	Time	Rank	Time	Rank	Time	Rank
Ewa Kamińska	K-1 500 m	2:12.38	1 Q	BYE		2:08.48	1Q	2:05.16	4
Maria Kazanecka; Katarzyna Kulczak	K-2 500 m	2:01.45	3 Q	—N/a		1:53.50	3 Q	1:55.05	6

== Cycling ==
=== Road ===
Athlete	Event	Time	Rank
Jan Brzeźny	Men's road race	4:19:09	30
Mieczysław Nowicki	Men's road race	4:47:23.0	Bronze medal
Stanisław Szozda	Men's road race	4:49:01.0	11
Ryszard Szurkowski	Men's road race	4:49:01.0	12
Ryszard Szurkowski; Tadeusz Mytnik; Mieczysław Nowicki; Stanisław Szozda	Team time trial	2:09:13.0	Silver medal

=== Track ===
1000m time trial

Athlete	Event	Time	Rank
Janusz Kierzkowski	Men's 1000m time trial	1:07.660	4

Men's Sprint

Athlete	Event	Round 1	Repechage 1	Round 2	Repechage 2	Repechage Finals	Quarterfinals	Semifinals	Final	
Athlete	Event	Time Speed (km/h)	Rank	Opposition Time Speed (km/h)	Opposition Time Speed (km/h)	Opposition Time Speed (km/h)	Opposition Time Speed (km/h)	Opposition Time Speed (km/h)	Opposition Time Speed (km/h)	Rank
Benedykt Kocot	Men's sprint	Rawlins (TRI); Chin (JAM); W 11.79	BYE	Fredborg (DEN); Berkmann (ITA); L	Tormen Mendez (CHI); Smith (BAR); L	did not advance				

Pursuit

Athlete	Event	Qualification		Round 1/8	Quarterfinals	Semifinals	Final	
Athlete	Event	Time	Rank	Opposition Time	Opposition Time	Opposition Time	Opposition Time	Rank
Jan Jankiewicz	Men's individual pursuit	4:51.48	7 Q	Klasa (TCH); L 4:54.94	did not advance			10
Czesław Lang; Jan Jankiewicz; Krzysztof Sujka; Zbigniew Szczepkowski	Team pursuit	4:27.21	5 Q	—N/a	Great Britain (GBR); L 4:27.13	did not advance		5

== Fencing ==
18 fencers, 13 men and 5 women, represented Poland in 1976.

=== Men ===
Athlete	Event	Round 1		Round 2		Round 3		Quarterfinal	Semifinal	Losers Round 1	Losers Round 2	Losers Round 3	Final	
Athlete	Event	Opposition Result	Rank	Opposition Result	Rank	Opposition Result	Rank	Opposition Result	Opposition Result	Opposition Result	Opposition Result	Opposition Result	Opposition Result	Rank
Jerzy Janikowski	Men's épée		2 Q		3 Q		4 Q	Behr (FRG) W 10-9	Jacobson (SWE) W 10-7	BYE			Push (FRG) L 4-5; Hehn (FRG) L 3-5; Kulcsár (HUN) L 3-5; Osztrics (HUN) W 5-4; Edling (SWE) W 5-2	5
Zbigniew Matwiejew	Men's épée		1 Q		5	did not advance								
Marceli Wiech	Men's épée		4	Did not advance										
Jerzy Janikowski; Zbigniew Matwiejew; Leszek Swornowski; Marceli Wiech	Team épée	France; L 1-13; Hungary; L 4-11	4	Did not advance										11
Marek Dąbrowski	Men's foil		3 Q		4 Q		4 Q	Noël (FRA) W 10-8	Stankovych (URS) L 3-10	BYE	Noël (FRA) L 5-10	did not advance		12
Lech Koziejowski	Men's foil		3 Q		4 Q		5	did not advance						
Ziemowit Wojciechowski	Men's foil		2 Q		2 Q		6	did not advance						
Leszek Martewicz; Lech Koziejowski; Ziemowit Wojciechowski; Arkadiusz Godel; Marek Dąbrowski	Team foil	Hong Kong; W 15-1; Iran; W 13-3; United States; W 9-2	1 Q	—N/a				West Germany; L 4-9	France; W 9-3	—N/a			Great Britain; W 9-1	5
Jacek Bierkowski	Men's sabre		2 Q		3 Q		3 Q	de la Torre (CUB) L 7-10	—N/a	Westbrook (USA) W 10-8	de la Torre (CUB) L 9-10	did not advance		9
Leszek Jabłonowski	Men's sabre		2 Q		4 Q		6	did not advance						23
Józef Nowara	Men's sabre	Nazlymov (URS) L 3-5; Bonissent (FRA) W 5-0; Méndez (ARG) L 2-5; Fathi (IRN) W 5-1	2 Q	Ortiz (CUB) L 4-5; Maffei (ITA) L 1-5; Dudenkov (BUL) W 5-3; Bena (FRA) W 5-3; Urban (CAN) W 5-1	3 Q	Pop (ROU) L 4-5; Arcidiacono (ITA) W 5-4; Ortiz (CUB) L 3-5; Marót (HUN) L 4-5; Bonissent (FRA) W 5-2	3 Q	Sidyak (URS) L 7-10	—N/a	Arcidiacono (ITA) L 6-10	did not advance			15
Leszek Jabłonowski; Józef Nowara; Sylwester Królikowski; Jacek Bierkowski	Team sabre	Argentina; W 10-6; Iran; W 9-7; Hungary; L 6-8	2 Q	—N/a				Romania; L 4-9	United States; W 9-3	—N/a			Cuba; W 9-6	6

=== Women ===
Athlete	Event	Round 1		Round 2		Round 3		Quarterfinal	Semifinal	Losers Round 1	Losers Round 2	Losers Round 3	Final	
Athlete	Event	Opposition Result	Rank	Opposition Result	Rank	Opposition Result	Rank	Opposition Result	Opposition Result	Opposition Result	Opposition Result	Opposition Result	Opposition Result	Rank
Krystyna Machnicka-Urbańska	Women's foil					did not advance								
Grażyna Staszak-Makowska	Women's foil								—N/a		did not advance			
Barbara Wysoczańska	Women's foil							did not advance						
Jolanta Bebel-Rzymowska; Kamilla Składanowska; Barbara Wysoczańska; Krystyna Machnicka-Urbańska; Grażyna Staszak-Makowska	Team foil	Canada; W 9-7; Soviet Union; L 2-9	2 Q	—N/a				France; L 5-9	Great Britain; W 8-8	—N/a			Italy; L 7-9	6

== Football ==
=== First round ===
==== Group C ====
Team	Pld	W	D	L	GF	GA	GD	Pts
Poland	2	1	1	0	3	2	+1	3
Iran	2	1	0	1	3	3	0	2
Cuba	2	0	1	1	0	1	−1	1

- **Ghana withdrew
July 18, 1976
12:00

Poland	0 – 0	Cuba
	Report

Lansdowne Park, Ottawa
Attendance: 29.417
Referee: Abraham Klein (Israel)

July 20, 1976
12:00

Iran	1 – 0	Cuba
Mazloumi 28'	Report

Lansdowne Park, Ottawa
Attendance: 11.324
Referee: Adolf Prokop (East Germany)

July 22, 1976
12:00

Poland	3 – 2	Iran
Szarmach 48' 75'; Deyna 51'	Report	Parvin 6'; Rowshan 79'

Olympic Stadium, Montreal
Attendance: 32.309
Referee: Arnaldo Cézar Coelho (Brazil)

=== Bracket ===
Quarter-finals
July 25 – Ottawa
East Germany	4
France	0
July 25 – Sherbrooke
Soviet Union	2
Iran	1
July 25 – Toronto
Brazil	4
Israel	1
July 25 – Montreal
Poland	5
North Korea	0

Semi-finals
July 27 – Montreal
East Germany	2
Soviet Union	1
July 27 – Toronto
Poland	2
Brazil	0

Final
July 31 – Montreal
East Germany	3
Poland	1
Bronze medal match
July 29 – Montreal
Soviet Union	2
Brazil	0

=== Quarter-finals ===
July 25, 1976
12:00

Poland	5 – 0	North Korea
Szarmach 13' 49'; Lato 59' 79'; Szymanowski 64'	Report

Olympic Stadium, Montreal
Attendance: 46.885
Referee: Paul Schiller (Austria)

=== Semi-finals ===
July 27, 1976
12:00

Poland	2 – 0	Brazil
Szarmach 51' 82'	Report

Varsity Stadium, Toronto
Attendance: 21.743
Referee: John Paterson (United Kingdom)

=== Gold Medal match ===
July 31, 1976

East Germany	3 – 1	Poland
Schade 7'; Hoffmann 14'; Häfner 84'	Report	Lato 59'

Olympic Stadium, Montreal
Attendance: 71.617
Referee: Ramón Barreto (Uruguay)

=== Team roster ===
Poland – Silver Medal

- Jan Tomaszewski
- Piotr Mowlik
- Antoni Szymanowski
- Jerzy Gorgoń
- Wojciech Rudy
- Władysław Żmuda
- Zygmunt Maszczyk
- Grzegorz Lato
- Henryk Wawrowski
- Henryk Kasperczak
- Roman Ogaza
- Kazimierz Kmiecik
- Kazimierz Deyna
- Andrzej Szarmach
- Henryk Wieczorek
- Leslaw Cmikiewicz
- Jan Benigier

Head coach

- Kazimierz Górski

== Gymnastics ==
=== Artistic ===
Men

Athlete	Event	Qualification								Final							
Athlete	Event	Apparatus						Total	Rank	Apparatus						Total	Rank
Athlete	Event	F	PH	R	V	PB	HB	Total	Rank	F	PH	R	V	PB	HB	Total	Rank
Grzegorz Ciastek	All-around	17.65	17.45	17.80	18.15	17.25	17.05	105.35	74	Did not advance							
Marian Pieczka	All-around	18.05	18.35	17.60	18.70	16.75	18.30	107.75	61	Did not advance							
Andrzej Szajna	All-around	19.00	18.70	18.95	19.10	19.00	19.10	113.85	11 Q	9.600	9.600	9.600	9.800	9.550	9.550	114.625	6
Roman Tkaczyk	All-around	17.75	17.30	17.65	18.15	17.80	17.70	106.35	69	Did not advance							
Łukasz Uhma	All-around	17.20	17.80	17.80	18.55	18.05	17.40	106.80	65	Did not advance							
Mariusz Zasada	All-around	16.60	18.40	18.45	18.20	17.35	17.10	106.10	71	Did not advance							
Grzegorz Ciastek; Marian Pieczka; Andrzej Szajna; Roman Tkaczyk; Łukasz Uhma; Mariusz Zasada	Team all-around	89.65	90.45	90.05	93.10	90.55	91.05	544.85	11	—N/a							

Individual finals

Athlete	Event	Apparatus						Total	Rank
Athlete	Event	F	PH	R	V	PB	HB	Total	Rank
Andrzej Szajna	Pommel horse	—N/a	18.950	—N/a				18.950	6

== Handball ==
=== Preliminary round ===
==== Group B ====
Rank	Team	Pld	W	D	L	GF	GA	Pts	(Romania)	(Poland)	(Hungary)	(Czechoslovakia)	(United States)
1.	Romania	4	3	1	0	91	71	7	X	17:15	23:18	19:19	32:19
2.	Poland	4	3	0	1	80	71	6	15:17	X	18:16	21:18	26:20
3.	Hungary	4	2	0	2	92	82	4	18:23	16:18	X	22:20	36:21
4.	Czechoslovakia	4	1	1	2	85	82	3	19:19	18:21	20:22	X	28:20
5.	United States	4	0	0	4	80	122	0	19:32	20:26	21:36	20:28	X

=== Bronze medal match ===
July 28, 1976

Poland	21 – 18	West Germany

Claude Robillard Centre, Montreal

=== Roster ===
Poland – Bronze Medal

- Zdzisław Antczak
- Janusz Brzozowski
- Piotr Cieśla
- Jan Gmyrek
- Alfred Kałuziński
- Jerzy Klempel
- Zygfryd Kuchta
- Jerzy Melcer
- Ryszard Przybysz
- Henryk Rozmiarek
- Mieczysław Wojczak
- Włodzimierz Zieliński
- Andrzej Sokołowski
- Andrzej Szymczak

Head coach

- Janusz Czerwiński

== Judo ==
Men

Athlete	Event	Round 1	Round 2	Round 3	Round 4	Repechage 1	Repechage 2	Final / BM	
Athlete	Event	Opposition Result	Opposition Result	Opposition Result	Opposition Result	Opposition Result	Opposition Result	Opposition Result	Rank
Marian Standowicz	−63kg	Manuel Luna (VEN); W 0001-0000	Héctor Rodriguez Torres (CUB); L 0000-0010	BYE			José Gomes (POR); W 0010-0000	József Tuncsik (HUN); L 0000-0100	5
Marian Tałaj	−70kg	Vladimir Nevzorov (URS); W 0000-1000	BYE			Thomas Hagman (SUI); W 0010-0000	John Van Hoek (AUS); W 0001-0000	Chang-Seon Lee (KOR); W 1000-0000	Bronze medal
Adam Adamczyk	−80kg	Daniel Guldemont (BEL); W 1000-0000	Slavko Obadov (YUG); L 0001-1000	did not advance					
Antoni Reiter	−93kg	BYE	Paul Buchel (LIE); W 1000-0000	Dietmar Lorenz (GDR); L 0001-0100	did not advance				
Waldemar Zausz	+93kg	Keith Remfry (GBR); L 0000–0010	did not advance						
Waldemar Zausz	Open	Jen-Luc Rouge (FRA); L 0000–1000	did not advance						

== Modern pentathlon ==
Three male pentathletes represented Poland in 1976. Janusz Pyciak-Peciak won an individual gold medal.

Athlete	Event	Shooting (10 m air pistol)	Fencing (épée one touch)	Swimming (200 m freestyle)	Riding (show jumping)	Running (3000 m)	Total points	Final rank
Athlete	Event	Points	Points	Points	Points	Points	Total points	Final rank
Zbigniew Pacelt	Men's	1100	592	890	1308	1138	5028	19
Janusz Pyciak-Peciak	Men's	1066	928	1044	1164	1318	5520	Gold medal
Krzysztof Trybusiewicz	Men's	1004	640	978	1072	1129	4823	34
Janusz Pyciak-Peciak; Zbigniew Pacelt; Krzysztof Trybusiewicz	Team	3170	2160	2912	3544	3585	15343	4

== Rowing ==
Men

Athlete	Event	Heats		Repechage		Semifinal		Final	
Athlete	Event	Time	Rank	Time	Rank	Time	Rank	Time	Rank
Zbigniew Ślusarski; Alfons Ślusarski	Coxless pair	6:58.98	2 Q	BYE		6:44.64	5 FB	7:35.53	11
Ryszard Stadniuk; Grzegorz Stellak; Ryszard Kubiak	Coxed pair	7:43.45	4 R	7:23.17	1 Q	7:09.33	3 Q	8:23.02	6
Jerzy Broniec; Adam Tomasiak; Jerzy Ulczyński; Ryszard Burak; Włodzimierz Chmielewski	Coxed four	6:42.55	4 R	6:22.16	1 Q	6:13.53	5 FB	6:51.85	8

Women

Athlete	Event	Heats		Repechage		Final	
Athlete	Event	Time	Rank	Time	Rank	Time	Rank
Ewa Ambroziak	Single sculls	3:58.09	5 R	4:16.74	4 FB	4:26.60	9
Anna Krzemińska-Karbowiak; Małgorzata Kawalska	Coxless pair	3:41.05	5 R	4:02.20	4 FB	4:03.26	8
Anna Brandysiewicz; Bogusława Kozłowska-Tomasiak; Barbara Wenta-Wojciechowska; Danuta Konkalec; Róża Data; Mieczysława Franczyk; Maria Stadnicka; Aleksandra Kaczyńska; Dorota Zdanowska	Eight	3:06.67	3 R	3:18.18	5 FB	3:32.48	7

== Sailing ==
Open

Athlete	Event	Race							Net points	Final rank
Athlete	Event	1	2	3	4	5	6	7	Net points	Final rank
Ryszard Blaszka	Finn	22	22	4	5	4	~~25~~	25	113.0	16

== Shooting ==
Open

Athlete	Event	Final	
Athlete	Event	Score	Rank
Zygmunt Bogdziewicz	Running target	553	15
Wiesław Gawlikowski	Skeet	196	Bronze medal
Jerzy Greszkiewicz	Running target	571	Bronze medal
Stanisław Marucha	50 metre rifle prone	587	37
Maciej Orlik	25 m rapid fire pistol	585	27
Eugeniusz Pędzisz	50 metre rifle three positions	1144	14
Sławomir Romanowski	50 m pistol	553	12
Romuald Siemionow	50 metre rifle three positions	1137	24
Adam Smelczyński	Trap	183	6
Andrzej Socharski	Skeet	192	14
Andrzej Trajda	50 metre rifle prone	589	28
Józef Zapędzki	25 m rapid fire pistol	556	45

== Swimming ==
Men

Athlete	Event	Heat		Semifinal		Final	
Athlete	Event	Time	Rank	Time	Rank	Time	Rank
Cezary Śmiglak	100 metre breaststroke	1:08.02	22	Did not advance			
Cezary Śmiglak	200 metre breaststroke	2:27.41	21	Did not advance			
Ryszard Żugaj	100 metre backstroke	1:00.16	16 Q	59.90	16	Did not advance	
Ryszard Żugaj	200 metre backstroke	2:12.53	29	Did not advance			

Women

Athlete	Event	Heat		Semifinal		Final	
Athlete	Event	Time	Rank	Time	Rank	Time	Rank
Anna Skolarczyk	100 metre breaststroke	1:17.16	19	Did not advance			
Anna Skolarczyk	200 metre breaststroke	2:42.05	18	Did not advance			

== Volleyball ==
=== Preliminary round ===
Pool A

Pos	Team	Pld	W	L	Pts	SW	SL	SR	SPW	SPL	SPR	Qualification
1	Poland	4	4	0	8	12	5	2.400	235	172	1.366	Semifinals
2	Cuba	4	3	1	7	11	4	2.750	208	142	1.465	Semifinals
3	Czechoslovakia	4	2	2	6	8	7	1.143	182	177	1.028	5th–8th semifinals
4	South Korea	4	1	3	5	6	9	0.667	146	187	0.781	5th–8th semifinals
5	Canada	4	0	4	4	0	12	0.000	88	181	0.486	

Date		Score		Set 1	Set 2	Set 3	Set 4	Set 5	Total
18 Jul	Czechoslovakia	3–0	Canada	15–4	16–14	15–11			46–29
18 Jul	Poland	3–2	South Korea	12–15	6–15	15–6	15–6	15–5	63–47
19 Jul	Poland	3–0	Canada	15–4	15–7	15–6			45–17
19 Jul	Cuba	3–1	Czechoslovakia	15–6	10–15	15–5	15–6		55–32
21 Jul	Poland	3–2	Cuba	13–15	10–15	15–6	15–9	20–18	73–63
21 Jul	South Korea	3–0	Canada	15–7	15–5	15–8			45–20
23 Jul	Cuba	3–0	South Korea	15–4	15–5	15–6			45–15
23 Jul	Poland	3–1	Czechoslovakia	8–15	15–11	15–5	16–14		54–45
25 Jul	Czechoslovakia	3–1	South Korea	15–9	15–9	14–16	15–5		59–39
25 Jul	Cuba	3–0	Canada	15–10	15–9	15–3			45–22

=== 1st–4th places ===
Semifinals
29 July
Poland	3
Japan	2
29 July
Cuba	0
Soviet Union	3

Gold medal match
30 July
Poland	3
Soviet Union	2
Bronze medal match
30 July
Japan	0
Cuba	3

=== Semifinals ===
Date		Score		Set 1	Set 2	Set 3	Set 4	Set 5	Total
29 Jul	Poland	3–2	Japan	15–17	15–6	15–6	10–15	15–10	70–54

=== Gold medal match ===
Date		Score		Set 1	Set 2	Set 3	Set 4	Set 5	Total
30 Jul	Poland	3–2	Soviet Union	11–15	15–13	12–15	19–17	15–7	72–67

=== Team roster ===
Poland – Gold Medal

- Włodzimierz Stefański
- Bronislaw Bebel
- Lech Łasko
- Edward Skorek
- Tomasz Wójtowicz
- Wiesław Gawłowski
- Mirosław Rybaczewski
- Zbigniew Lubiejewski
- Ryszard Bosek
- Włodzimierz Sadalski
- Zbigniew Zarzycki
- Marek Karbarz

Head coach

- Hubert Wagner

== Weightlifting ==
Men

Athlete	Event	Snatch		Clean & Jerk		Total	Rank
Athlete	Event	Result	Rank	Result	Rank	Total	Rank
Stefan Leletko	52 kg	95	7	125	6	220	6
Zygmunt Smalcerz	52 kg	0	NVL	0	DNS	0	AC
Grzegorz Cziura	56 kg	115	2	137.5	4	252.5	Silver medal
Leszek Skorupa	56 kg	112.5	3	137.5	4	250.0	4
Antoni Pawlak	60 kg	120	4	0	NVL	120	AC
Jan Łostowski	60 kg	0	NVL	0	DNS	0	AC
Kazimierz Czarnecki	67,5 kg	130	3	165	3	295	Bronze medal
Zbigniew Kaczmarek	67,5 kg	135	AC	172.5	AC	307.5	DQ
Tadeusz Rutkowski	110 kg	167.5	2	210	4	377.5	Bronze medal

== Wrestling ==
Men's freestyle

Athlete	Event	Elimination Pool						Final round	
Athlete	Event	Round 1 Result	Round 2 Result	Round 3 Result	Round 4 Result	Round 5 Result	Round 6 Result	Final round Result	Rank
Władysław Stecyk	−52 kg	Jamsrangiin Mönkh-Ochir (MGL); W T 8:30	Julien Mewis (BEL); W T 1:26	Nermedin Selimov (BUL); W 11-8	Yuji Takada (JPN); L T 5:39	Alexander Ivanov (URS); L 5 – 26	—N/a	Did not advance	6
Zbigniew Żedzicki	−57 kg	BYE	Joe Corso (USA); W T 1:02	Li Ho-Pyong (PRK); L 10-13	Miho Dukov (BUL); L 7 – 14	—N/a		Did not advance	8
Henryk Mazur	−82 kg	Mehmet Uzun (TUR); W 9-4	Mohammad Hassan Mohebbi (IRI); W 13-10	Ibrahim Diop (SEN); W T 5:21	Adolf Seger (FRG); L 6 – 26	—N/a		Did not advance	6
Paweł Kurczewski	−90 kg	Géza Molnár (HUN); W 6-3	Salah Uddin (PAK); W T 1:50	Horst Stottmeister (GDR); L T 5:11	Keijo Manni (FIN); W T 0:57	Ben Peterson (USA); W 4-13	—N/a	Did not advance	6

Men's Greco-Roman

Athlete	Event	Elimination Pool						Final round	
Athlete	Event	Round 1 Result	Round 2 Result	Round 3 Result	Round 4 Result	Round 5 Result	Round 6 Result	Final round Result	Rank
Aleksander Zajączkowski	−48kg	Sirvano Valdes (CUB); L 6 – 11	Gheorghe Berceanu (ROU); L T 0:20	—N/a				Did not advance	11
Czesław Stanjek	−52kg	Jamsrangiin Mönkh-Ochir (MGL); W DQ 6:52	Antonino Caltabiano (ITA); L 6-11	DNS	—N/a			Did not advance	9
Józef Lipień	−57kg	Mihai Boţilă (ROU); L DQ 8:00	Yoshima Suga (JPN); W 16-12	Pertti Ukkola (FIN); W 9-4	Farhat Mustafin (URS); L 4-29	—N/a		Did not advance	10
Kazimierz Lipień	−62kg	Howard Stupp (CAN); W 37-0	Joaquim Jesus Vieira (POR); W T 1:59	Stoyan Lazarov (BUL); W 16-0	Stelios Mygiakis (GRE); W DQ 8:55	BYE	Nelson Davidyan (URS); L 6 – 10	László Réczi (HUN); W 13-4	Gold medal
Andrzej Supron	−68kg	Ștefan Rusu (ROU); L 1-13	Jacques van Lancker (BEL); W T 5:04	Nedelcho Nedev (BUL); W 9-7	Kim Hae-Myung (KOR); W T 1:47	Suren Nalbandyan (URS); L 4-7	—N/a	Did not advance	5
Stanisław Krzesiński	−74kg	Mikko Huhtala (FIN); L DQ 5:15	Idalberto Barbán (CUB); W DQ 7:53	Klaus-Peter Göpfert (GDR); L T 1:14	—N/a			Did not advance	11
Adam Ostrowski	−82kg	BYE	Giuseppe Vitucci (ITA); W DQ 7:19	Keijo Manni (FIN); L DQ 7:56	Leif Andersson (SWE); L 6-9	—N/a		Did not advance	8
Czesław Kwieciński	−90kg	BYE	Sadao Sato (JPN); W T 2:00	Hashem Kolahi (IRI); W T 0:12	Valery Rezantsev (URS); L 3-9	Darko Nišavić (YUG); W DQ 8:00	—N/a	Stoyan Ivanov (BUL); W T 6:46	Bronze medal
Andrzej Skrzydlewski	−100kg	Bahram Moshtaghi (IRI); W T 2:24	Daniel Verník (ARG); W T 1:17	Brad Rheingans (USA); L 7-9	Heinz Schäfer (FRG); W T 2:59	Nikolai Balboshin (URS); L T 2:04	—N/a	Kamen Goranov (BUL); L 2-6	Bronze medal
Henryk Tomanek	+100kg	Alexander Kolchinsky (URS); L T 2:40	Einar Gundersen (NOR); WDQ 6:54	William Lee (USA); W DQ 8:35	Aleksandar Tomov (BUL); L T 0:23	—N/a		Did not advance	4
