= Romania at the 1976 Summer Olympics =

- IOC code: ROU (ROM used at these Games)
- NOC: Romanian Olympic Committee

in Montreal
- Competitors: 157 (103 men and 54 women) in 11 sports
- Flag bearer: Nicolae Martinescu (wrestling)
- Medals Ranked 9th: Gold 4 Silver 9 Bronze 14 Total 27

Summer Olympics appearances (overview)
- 1900; 1904–1920; 1924; 1928; 1932; 1936; 1948; 1952; 1956; 1960; 1964; 1968; 1972; 1976; 1980; 1984; 1988; 1992; 1996; 2000; 2004; 2008; 2012; 2016; 2020; 2024

Romania competed at the 1976 Summer Olympics in Montreal, Canada. 157 competitors, 103 men and 54 women, took part in 92 events in 11 sports.

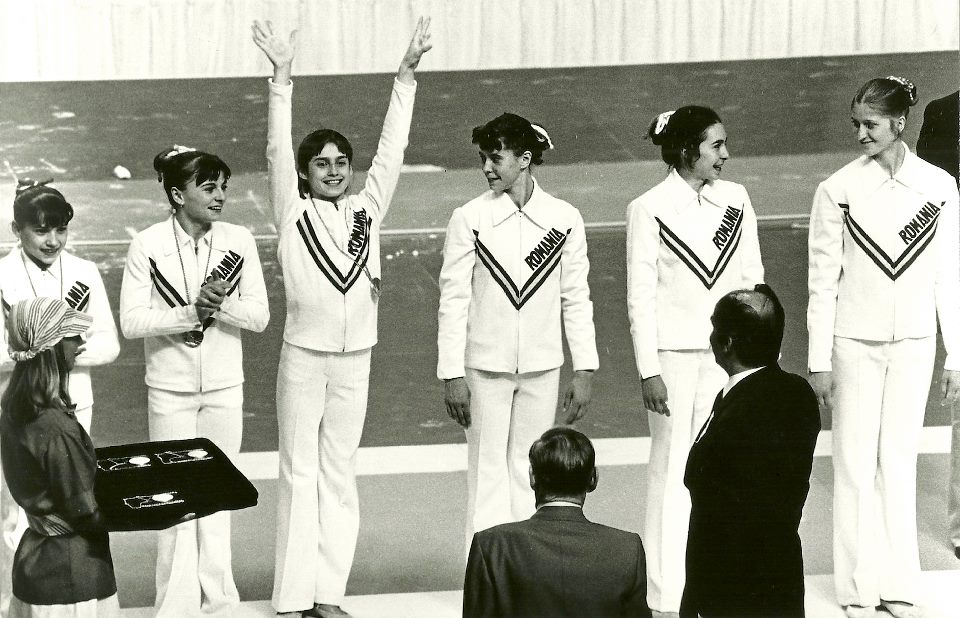
Medal ceremony for the Romanian National Team at the Montreal 1976 Summer Olympics.

== Medalists ==
Medal	Name	Sport	Event	Date
Gold	Nadia Comăneci	Artistic gymnastics	Women's All-Around Individual	July 21
Gold	Nadia Comăneci	Artistic gymnastics	Women's Uneven Bars	July 22
Gold	Nadia Comăneci	Artistic gymnastics	Women's Balance Beam	July 22
Gold	Vasile Dîba	Canoeing	Men's K-1 500 metres	July 30
Silver	Simion Cuţov	Boxing	Men's Lightweight	July 31
Silver	Mircea Şimon	Boxing	Men's Heavyweight	July 31
Silver	Gheorghe Danilov and Gheorghe Simionov	Canoeing	Men's C-2 1000 Metres	July 31
Silver	Teodora Ungureanu	Artistic gymnastics	Women's Uneven Bars	July 19
Silver	Teodora Ungureanu, Anca Grigoraș, Gabriela Trușcă, Nadia Comăneci, Mariana Constantin, and Georgeta Gabor	Artistic gymnastics	Women's Artistic Team All-Around	July 19
Silver	Gheorghe Berceanu	Wrestling	Men's Greco-Roman 48	July 24
Silver	Constantin Tudosie, Radu Voina, Nicolae Munteanu, Cornel Penu, Werner Stöckl, Roland Gunesch, Gabriel Kicsid, Ghiţă Licu, Alexandru Fölker, Cristian Gațu, Mircea Grabovschi, Ştefan Birtalan, Adrian Cosma, and Cezar Drăgăniṭă	Handball	Men's Handball	July 28
Silver	Nicu Gingă	Wrestling	Men's Greco-Roman 52 kg	July 24
Silver	Ștefan Rusu	Wrestling	Men's Greco-Roman 68 kg	July 24
Bronze	Gheorghe Megelea	Athletics	Men's Javelin Throw	July 26
Bronze	Victor Zilberman	Boxing	Men's Welterweight	July 31
Bronze	Alec Năstac	Boxing	Men's Middleweight	July 31
Bronze	Costică Dafinoiu	Boxing	Men's Light Heavyweight	July 31
Bronze	Vasile Dîba	Canoeing	Men's K-1 1000 metres	July 31
Bronze	Policarp Malîhin and Larion Serghei	Canoeing	Men's K-2 500 Metres	July 30
Bronze	Alexandru Nilca, Ioan Pop, Dan Irimiciuc, Cornel Marin, and Marin Mustață	Fencing	Men's team sabre	July 27
Bronze	Dan Grecu	Artistic Gymnastics	Men's rings	July 23
Bronze	Teodora Ungureanu	Artistic Gymnastic	Women's Balance Beam	July 22
Bronze	Nadia Comăneci	Artistic Gymnastics	Women's Floor	July 22
Bronze	Ioana Tudoran, Felicia Afrăsiloaie, Elena Giurcă, and Maria Micșa	Rowing	Women's Quadruple Skulls	July 24
Bronze	Roman Codreanu	Wrestling	Men's Greco-Roman +100 kg	July 24
Bronze	Stelică Morcov	Wrestling	Men's Freestyle 90 kg	July 31
Bronze	Ladislau Simon	Wrestling	Men's Freestyle +100 kg	July 31

Medals by sport
Sport	1st place, gold medalist(s)	2nd place, silver medalist(s)	3rd place, bronze medalist(s)	Total
Athletics	0	0	1	1
Boxing	0	2	3	5
Canoeing	1	1	2	4
Fencing	0	0	1	1
Gymnastics	3	2	3	8
Handball	0	1	0	1
Rowing	0	0	1	1
Wrestling	0	3	3	6
Total	4	9	14	27

Medals by gender
Gender	1st place, gold medalist(s)	2nd place, silver medalist(s)	3rd place, bronze medalist(s)	Total
Male	1	7	11	19
Female	3	2	3	8
Total	4	9	14	27

=== Gold ===
- Nadia Comăneci — Gymnastics, Women's All-Around Individual
- Nadia Comăneci — Gymnastics, Women's Asymmetrical Bars
- Nadia Comăneci — Gymnastics, Women's Balance Beam
- Vasile Dîba — Canoeing, Men's K1 500m Kayak Singles

=== Silver ===
- Simion Cuţov — Boxing, Men's Lightweight (– 60 kg)
- Mircea Şimon — Boxing, Men's Heavyweight (– 81 kg)
- Gheorghe Danilov and Gheorghe Simionov — Canoeing, Men's C2 1000m Canadian Pairs
- Teodora Ungureanu — Gymnastics, Women's Asymmetrical Bars
- Teodora Ungureanu, Anca Grigoraș, Gabriela Trușcă, Nadia Comăneci, Mariana Constantin, and Georgeta Gabor — Gymnastics, Women's Team Combined Exercises
- Constantin Tudosie, Radu Voina, Nicolae Munteanu, Cornel Penu, Werner Stöckl, Roland Gunesch, Gabriel Kicsid, Ghiţă Licu, Alexandru Fölker, Cristian Gațu, Mircea Grabovschi, Ştefan Birtalan, Adrian Cosma, and Cezar Drăgăniṭă — Handball, Men's Team Competition
- Gheorghe Berceanu — Wrestling, Men's Greco-Roman Light Flyweight
- Nicu Ginga — Wrestling, Men's Greco-Roman Flyweight
- Ștefan Rusu — Wrestling, Men's Greco-Roman Lightweight

=== Bronze ===
- Gheorghe Megelea — Athletics, Men's Javelin Throw
- Victor Zilberman — Boxing, Men's Welterweight (– 67 kg)
- Alec Năstac — Boxing, Men's Middleweight (– 75 kg)
- Kostica Dafinoiu — Boxing, Men's Light Heavyweight (– 81 kg)
- Vasile Dîba — Canoeing, Men's K1 1000m Kayak Singles
- Policarp Malîhin and Larion Serghei — Canoeing, Men's K2 500m Kayak Pairs
- Alexandru Nilca, Ioan Pop, Dan Irimiciuc, Corneliu Marin, and Marin Mustata — Fencing, Men's Sabre Team Competition
- Danuţ Grecu — Gymnastics, Men's Rings
- Teodora Ungureanu — Gymnastics, Women's Balance Beam
- Nadia Comăneci — Gymnastics, Women's Floor Exercises
- Ioana Tudoran, Felicia Afrăsiloaie, Elena Giurcă, and Maria Micșa — Rowing, Women's Coxed Quadruple Sculls
- Roman Codreanu — Wrestling, Men's Greco-Roman Super Heavyweight
- Stelica Morcov — Wrestling, Men's Freestyle Light Heavyweight
- Ladislau Simon — Wrestling, Men's Freestyle Super Heavyweight

== Athletics ==
Men's 10.000 metres

- Ilie Floroiu

- Heat — 28:23.40
- Final — 27:59.93 (→ 5th place)

Men's Discus Throw

- Iosif Nagy

- Qualification — 57.28m (→ did not advance)

Women's Javelin Throw

- Éva Ráduly-Zörgő

- Qualification — 55.34 m
- Final — 55.60 m (→ 11th place)

== Boxing ==
Men's Light Flyweight (– 48 kg)

- Remus Cosma

- 1st Round — Lost to Payao Pooltarat (Thailand), 1-4

Men's Bantamweight (54 kg)

- Faredin Ibrahim lost to Gu Yong Jo (North Korea) 1-4

Men's Featherweight (57 kg)

- Gheorghe Ciochină def. Jackson Ouma (Kenya) WO, def. René Weller (West Germany) 4-1, lost to Richard Nowakowski (East Germany) KO 3rd round

Men's Lightweight (60 kg)

- Simion Cuțov def. Silvester Mittee (Great Britain) RSCH 3rd round, def. Nelson Calzadilla (Venezuela) 5-0, def. Ove Lundby (Sweden) 5-0, def. Vasili Solomin (Soviet Union) 5-0, lost to Howard Davis (USA) 0-5 (→ Silver Medal)

Men's Light Welterweight (63.5 kg)

- Calistrat Cuțov def. Jean-Claude Ruiz (France) 5-0, def. Sjamsul Hanrahap (Indonesia) 5-0, lost to Vladimir Kolev (Bulgaria) (0-5)

Men's Welterweight (67 kg)

- Victor Zilberman def. Amon Kotey (Ghana) WO, def. Colin Jones (Great Britain)5-0, def. Carlos Santos (Puerto Rico) 3-2, lost to Jochen Bachfeld (East Germany) 2-3 (→ Bronze Medal)

Men's Light Middleweight (71 kg)

- Vasile Didea def. Michael Prevost (Canada) disq.3rd round, def. Naiden Stanchev (Bulgaria) 3-2, lost to Tadija Kačar (Yugoslavia) 0-5

Men's Middleweight (71 kg)

- Alec Năstac def. Philip Mc. Elwaine (Australia) 3-2, def. Fernando Martins (Brazil) 3-2, lost to Michael Spinks (USA) WO (→ Bronze Medal)

Men's Light Heavyweight (81 kg)

- Costică Dafinoiu def. Robert Nixon (Guyana) WO, def. Robert Burgess (Bermuda) 5-0, lost to Sixto Soria (Cuba) abandon 1st round (→ Bronze Medal)

Men's Heavyweight (+81 kg)

- Mircea Simon def. Trevor Berbick (Jamaica) 5-0, def. Atanas Suvandjiev (Bulgaria) 4-1, def. Clarence Hill (Bermuda) 5-0, lost to Teofilo Stevenson (Cuba) abandon 3rd round (→ Silver Medal)

== Fencing ==
18 fencers, 13 men and 5 women, represented Romania in 1976.

Men's foil

- Petru Kuki
- Mihai Țiu
- Tudor Petruș

Men's team foil

- Petru Kuki, Mihai Țiu, Tudor Petruș, Petrică Buricea

Men's épée

- Nicolae Iorgu
- Paul Szabo
- Anton Pongratz

Men's team épée

- Ioan Popa, Anton Pongratz, Nicolae Iorgu, Paul Szabo

Men's sabre

- Ioan Pop
- Dan Irimiciuc
- Cornel Marin

Men's team sabre

- Dan Irimiciuc, Ioan Pop, Marin Mustață, Cornel Marin, Alexandru Nilca

Women's foil

- Ecaterina Stahl-Iencic
- Magdalena Bartoș
- Ana Derșidan-Ene-Pascu

Women's team foil

- Ileana Gyulai-Drîmbă-Jenei, Marcela Moldovan-Zsak, Ecaterina Stahl-Iencic, Ana Derșidan-Ene-Pascu, Magdalena Bartoș

== Handball ==
-;Women's Team Competition

- Championship Pool

- Lost to East Germany (12-18)
- Lost to Soviet Union (8-14)
- Defeated Japan (21-20)
- Defeated Canada (17-11)
- Lost to Hungary (15-20)→ 4th place

- Team Roster

- Iuliana Hobincu
- Elisabeta Ionescu
- Rozalia Șooș
- Simona Arghir
- Maria Lackovics
- Georgeta Lăcusta
- Doina Furcoi
- Niculina Sasu
- Cristina Petrovici
- Constantina Pițigoi
- Doina Cojocaru
- Magdalena Miklos
- Maria Bosi
- Viorica Ionică

-;Men's Team Competition

- Preliminary Pool, Group B

- Defeated Hungary (23-18)
- Defeated USA (32-19)
- Drew with Czechoslovakia (19-19)
- Defeated Poland (17-15)

- Final Round, Gold Medal Match

- Lost to Soviet Union (15-19)(→ Silver Medal)

- Team Roster

- Cornel Penu
- Nicolae Munteanu
- Gabriel Kicsid
- Ghiţă Licu
- Cezar Drăgăniță
- Cristian Gațu
- Radu Voina
- Roland Gunesch
- Alexandru Folker
- Ștefan Birtalan
- Adrian Cosma
- Constantin Tudosie
- Werner Stockl
- Mircea Grabovschi

== Water polo ==
Men's Team Competition

- Team Roster

- Adrian Nastasiu
- Adrian Schervan
- Claudiu Ioan Rusu
- Corneliu Rusu
- Dinu Popescu
- Doru Spînu
- Florin Slâvei
- Gheorghe Zamfirescu
- Ilie Slâvei
- Liviu Râducanu
- Viorel Rus

== Wrestling ==
Greco-Roman Wrestling

48 kg

- Gheorghe Berceanu def. Moriwaki(Japan) 4-3, def. Zajączkowski (Poland) fall 0:20, def. Kawasaki (Canada) 14-1, def. Hinz (East Germany) fall 2:08, def. Angelov (Bulgaria) 4-3, lost to Shumakov (Soviet Union) 6-10 (→ Silver Medal)

52 kg

- Nicu Gingă def. Kirov (Bulgaria) injury 5:11, lost to Konstantinov (Soviet Union) 11-17, def. Kraus (West Germany) disq. 7:08, def. Caltabiano (Italy) 11-1, def. Hirayama (Japan) disq. 5:45 (→ Silver Medal)

57 kg

- Mihai Boțilă def. Józef Lipień (Poland) disq., def. Ahn Han Yung (South Korea) 8-0, lost to Mustafin (Soviet Union) 6-14, def. Krysta (Czechoslovakia) 12-0, lost to Pertti Ukkola (Finland) disq. 5:19 →5th place

62 kg

- Ion Păun def. Malmkvist (Sweden) fall 5:40, def. Choi Kyung Soo (South Korea) fall 5:53, def. Hjelt (Finland) 11-4, lost to Miyahara (Japan) 2-6, lost to Réczi (Hungary) injury 1:25 →5th place

68 kg

- Ștefan Rusu def. Andrzej Supron (Poland) 13-1, def. Kim Halmyung (South Korea) fall 2:49, def. Kobayashi (Japan) disq. 3:45, lost to Suren Nalbandyan (Soviet Union) 3-5, def. Wehling (East Germany) disq. 7:45 (→ Silver Medal)

74 kg

- Gheorghe Ciobotaru drew with Karlsson (Sweden) double disqualification, def. Nagatomo (Japan) disq. 6:50, def. Kiss (Austria) fall 5:41, lost to Bykov (Soviet Union) 6-7 →6th place

82 kg

- Ion Enache def. Cummings (Canada) injury 7:40, def. Andersson (Sweden) 6-4, drew with Kolev (Bulgaria) 8-8, lost to Momir Petković (Yugoslavia) 2-3 →7th place

90 kg

- Petre Dicu lost to Sellyei (Hungary) 2-7, lost to Rezantsev (Soviet Union) fall 2:51

100 kg

- Nicolae Martinescu lost to Nikolay Balboshin (Soviet Union) fall 1:23, def. N'diaye (Senegal) fall 2:18, lost to Goranov (Bulgaria) 5:51 →7th place

+100 kg

- Roman Codreanu def. Ronnyai (Hungary) disq. 7:22, def. Robertsson (Sweden) disq. 3:59, def. Wolff (West Germany) disq. 5:15, def. Lee (USA) disq. 7:30, lost to Aleksandr Kolchinski (Soviet Union) fall 0:37, lost to Tomov (Bulgaria) injury 0:32 (→ Bronze Medal)

'
