= Thailand at the 1976 Summer Olympics =

- IOC code: THA
- NOC: National Olympic Committee of Thailand

in Montreal
- Competitors: 42 in 11 sports
- Medals Ranked 37th: Gold 0 Silver 0 Bronze 1 Total 1

Summer Olympics appearances (overview)
- 1952; 1956; 1960; 1964; 1968; 1972; 1976; 1980; 1984; 1988; 1992; 1996; 2000; 2004; 2008; 2012; 2016; 2020; 2024

Thailand competed at the 1976 Summer Olympics in Montreal, Quebec, Canada. Forty-two competitors, 39 men and 3 women, took part in 33 events in 11 sports.

The country won their first Olympic medal, a bronze for boxing's Payao Poontarat. It became the third Southeast Asian country to win the first Olympic medal after the Philippines (won a bronze for swimming in 1928) and Singapore (won a silver in 1960 in weightlifting). It took 20 years until Thailand won its first gold medal in Atlanta, also in the boxing.

== Medalists ==
Medal	Name	Sport	Event	Date
Bronze	Payao Poontarat	Boxing	Light Flyweight	29 July

== Archery ==
Women's Individual Competition:

- Am. Kaewbaidhoon — 2282 points (→ 18th place)

Men's Individual Competition:

- Vallop Potaya — 2060 points (→ 35th place)
- Vichit Suksumpong — 2032 points (→ 36th place)

== Athletics ==
Men's 4 × 100 metres Relay

- Anat Ratanapol, Suchart Jairsuraparp, Somsakdi Boontud, and Sayan Paratanavong

- Heat — 40.53s
- Semi Finals — 40.68s (→ did not advance)

== Boxing ==
Athlete	Event	Round of 32	Round of 16	Quarterfinals	Semifinals	Final	
Athlete	Event	Opposition Result	Opposition Result	Opposition Result	Opposition Result	Opposition Result	Rank
Payao Poontarat	Men's Light Flyweight	Cosma (ROU); W 4–1	Tkachenko (URS); W 3–2	Gedó (HUN); W 4–1	Byong-Uk (PRK); L RSC–2	Did not advance	3rd place, bronze medalist(s)
Somchai Putapibarn	Men's Flyweight	Chul-Kim (KOR); L 0–5	Did not advance				
Narong Boonfuang	Men's Light Welterweight	Gómet (ESP); W KO	Sittler (AUT); L KO	Did not advance			

== Cycling ==
Six cyclists represented Thailand in 1976.

Individual road race

- Panya Singprayool-Dinmuong — did not finish (→ no ranking)
- Arlee Wararong — did not finish (→ no ranking)
- Chartchai Juntrat — did not finish (→ no ranking)
- Prajin Rungrote — did not finish (→ no ranking)

Team time trial

- Sucheep Likittay
- Chartchai Juntrat
- Panya Singprayool-Dinmuong
- Prajin Rungrote

Sprint

- Taworn Tarwan — 24th place

1000m time trial

- Taworn Tarwan — 1:15.136 (→ 27th place)

== Fencing ==
Five fencers, all men, represented Thailand in 1976.

Men's épée

- Taweewat Hurapan
- Sneh Chousurin
- Sutipong Santitevagul

Men's team épée

- Sneh Chousurin, Taweewat Hurapan, Sutipong Santitevagul, Royengyot Srivorapongpant, Samachai Trangjaroenngarm

Men's sabre

- Taweewat Hurapan
- Sutipong Santitevagul
- Royengyot Srivorapongpant

Men's team sabre

- Taweewat Hurapan, Samachai Trangjaroenngarm, Sutipong Santitevagul, Royengyot Srivorapongpant
