= Bebel (surname) =

Bebel is a German-language surname. Notable people with this surname include:

- August Bebel (1840–1913), German socialist politician, writer and chairman of the Social Democratic Party of Germany
- Bronisław Bebel (born 1949), former Polish volleyball player
- Dany Bébel-Gisler (1935–2003), Afro-Guadeloupean writer and sociolinguist
- Heinrich Bebel (1472–1518), German humanist
- Jean-Paul Belmondo (1933–2021), French actor, also known as Bébel
- Jolanta Bebel (born 1950), Polish fencer

== See also ==
- Bebel Gilberto, Isabel Gilberto de Oliveira (born 1966), Brazilian American popular singer
