= Slăvei =

Slăvei is a surname. Notable people with the surname include:

- Florin Slăvei (1951–1995), Romanian water polo player
- Ilie Slăvei (born 1952), Romanian water polo player
