= Quivrin =

Quivrin is a French surname. Notable people with the surname include:

- Jocelyn Quivrin (1979–2009), French actor
- Patrick Quivrin (born 1952), French fencer
