= Siemionow =

Siemionow is a Polish surname. Notable people with the surname include:

- Maria Siemionow (born 1950), Polish transplant surgeon and scientist
- Romuald Siemionow (1949–2008), Polish sports shooter
- Krzysztof Siemionow (born 1977), Polish American surgeon, entrepreneur, businessman
