= Bejarano =

Family name

Bejarano is a Spanish surname. Notable people with the surname include:

- Alejandro Bejarano (born 1984), Argentine footballer
- César Bejarano (born 1941), Paraguayan fencer
- Cristián Bejarano (born 1981), Mexican boxer
- Danny Bejarano (born 1994), Bolivian footballer
- Diego Bejarano (born 1991), Bolivian footballer
- Diego Murillo Bejarano (born 1961), Colombian leader of the United Self-Defense Forces of Colombia
- Edna Bejarano (born 1951), German singer
- Esther Béjarano (1924–2021), Jewish survivor of German Nazi concentration camp
- Eusebio Bejarano (born 1948), Spanish footballer
- Fernando Niño Bejarano (born 1974), Spanish footballer
- Gustavo Noboa Bejarano (1937–2021), Ecuadorian politician
- Haim Bejarano (1846-1931), Bulgarian-born Turkish chief rabbi of Sephardic Jewish origin
- Jessica Bejarano, US conductor
- Leon Bejarano, co-founder of Beko Elektronik A.S.
- Marvin Bejarano (born 1988), Bolivian footballer
- Miguel Bejarano Moreno (born 1967), Spanish sculptor
- Rafael Bejarano (born 1982), American jockey
- Rafael Guerra Bejarano (1862–1941), Spanish bullfighter
- Ramon Bejarano (born 1969), US Catholic bishop
- René Bejarano (born 1957), Mexican politician
- Shimon Bejarano (1910-1971), Bulgarian-born Israeli industrialist and politician of Sephardic Jewish origin
- Yolanda Bejarano, American union organizer

== See also ==
- José María Martín Bejarano-Serrano (born 1987), Spanish footballer
- Juan de Acuña y Bejarano, 2nd Marquis of Casa Fuerte (1658–1734), Spanish military officer
