= Julio Abreu =

Paraguayan swimmer (1954–2022)

Emilio Abreu
Personal information
- Born: 10 June 1954 Asunción, Paraguay
- Died: 21 February 2022 (aged 67)

Sport
- Sport: Swimming

Emilio Julio Abreu (10 June 1954 – 21 February 2022) was a Paraguayan swimmer and Pastor. He competed in three events at the 1976 Summer Olympics. Abreu died on 21 February 2022, at the age of 67.

== Later life and controversy ==
Abreu was co-founder and pastor of the evangelical church Centro Familiar de Adoración (CFA), which he established in 1985 with his wife, Bethany Boss.

According to Paraguay's Comisión de Verdad y Justicia (CVJ), Abreu was the beneficiary of an irregular land allocation by the Instituto de Bienestar Rural (IBR) in 1983. The commission identified a 4,000-hectare property in the district of Eugenio A. Garay (now part of Boquerón Department) among lands it classified as irregularly adjudicated during the Stroessner era.
