= Tommaso Montano =

Italian fencer (born 1953)

Personal information
- Born: 14 March 1953 (age 73) Livorno, Italy

Sport
- Sport: Fencing
Medal record
Men's fencing
Representing Italy
Olympic Games
Silver medal – second place	1976 Montréal	Sabre, team

Tommaso Montano (born 14 March 1953) is an Italian fencer. He won a silver medal in the team sabre event at the 1976 Summer Olympics.
