= Heinrich Bebel =

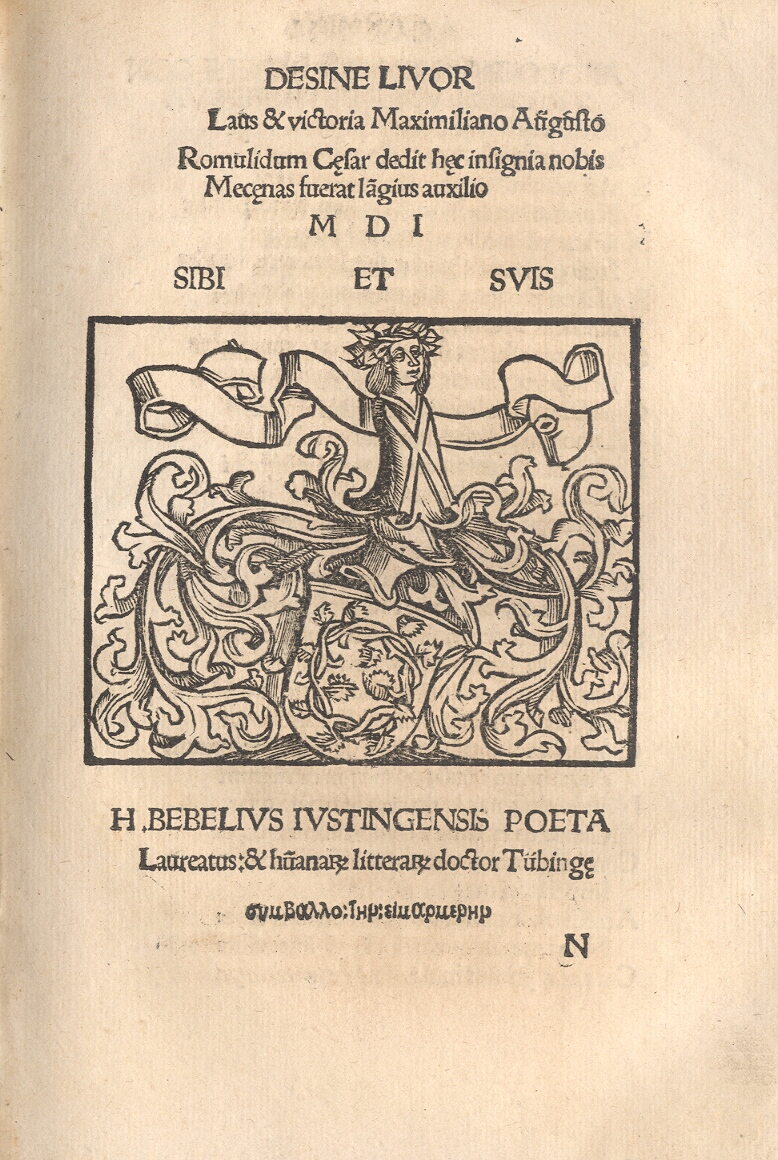

Heinrich Bebel (1472 in Ingstetten (now part of Schelklingen) – 1518 Tübingen) was a German humanist.

== Biography ==
He was an alumnus of Kraków and Basel universities, and from 1497 professor of poetry and rhetoric at the University of Tübingen. His fame rests principally on his Facetiae (1506), a curious collection of bits of homely and rather coarse-grained humor and anecdote, directed mainly against the clergy; on Proverbia Germanica (1508; new ed., Leyden, 1879); and on his Triumph of Venus, a keen satire on the depravity of his time. He was a friend of Erasmus.
