= Alexandru Nilca =

Romanian fencer

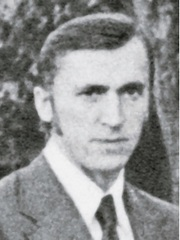

Personal information
- Born: Sándor Nyilka; 6 November 1945 (age 80) Târgu Mureş, Romania
- Height: 180 cm (5 ft 11 in)
- Weight: 74 kg (163 lb)

Sport
- Sport: Fencing
- Event: Sabre
- Club: Tg. Mures; CSA Steaua București
- Coached by: Andrei Kakucs; Ladislau Rohonyi; Dumitru Mustaţă
Medal record
Representing Romania
Olympic Games
Bronze medal – third place	1976 Montréal	Sabre, team
World Fencing Championships
Silver medal – second place	1974 Grenoble	Sabre, team
Silver medal – second place	1977 Buenos Aires	Sabre, team

Alexandru Nilca (Hungarian: Sándor Nyilka; born 6 November 1945) is a retired Romanian (ethnic Hungarian) sabre fencer. He competed at the 1976 and 1980 Olympics and won a team bronze medal in 1976, placing fifth in 1980. He won two team silver medals at the world championships in 1974 and 1977.
