= Włodzimierz Zieliński =

Polish handball player (born 1955)

Olympic medal record

Men's Handball
Bronze medal – third place	1976 Montreal	Team

Włodzimierz Zdzisław Zieliński (born 29 March 1955 in Mława) is a former Polish handball player who competed in the 1976 Summer Olympics.

In 1976 he won the bronze medal with the Polish team. He played one match.
