= Gabriel Kicsid =

Romanian handball player (born 1948)

Medal record

Men's handball

Representing Romania

Olympic Games
Silver medal – second place	1976 Montreal	Team
Bronze medal – third place	1972 Munich	Team

World Championships
Gold medal – first place	1970 France	Team
Gold medal – first place	1974 East Germany	Team

Gabriel Gavril Kicsid (born 2 April 1948 in Imeni, Covasna County) is a former Romanian handball player who competed in the 1972 Summer Olympics and in the 1976 Summer Olympics.

In 1972 he won the bronze medal with the Romanian team. He played all six matches and scored twelve goals.

Four years later he won the silver medal as part of the Romanian team. He played four matches including the final and scored four goals.
