= Henryk Rozmiarek =

Polish handball player (1949–2021)

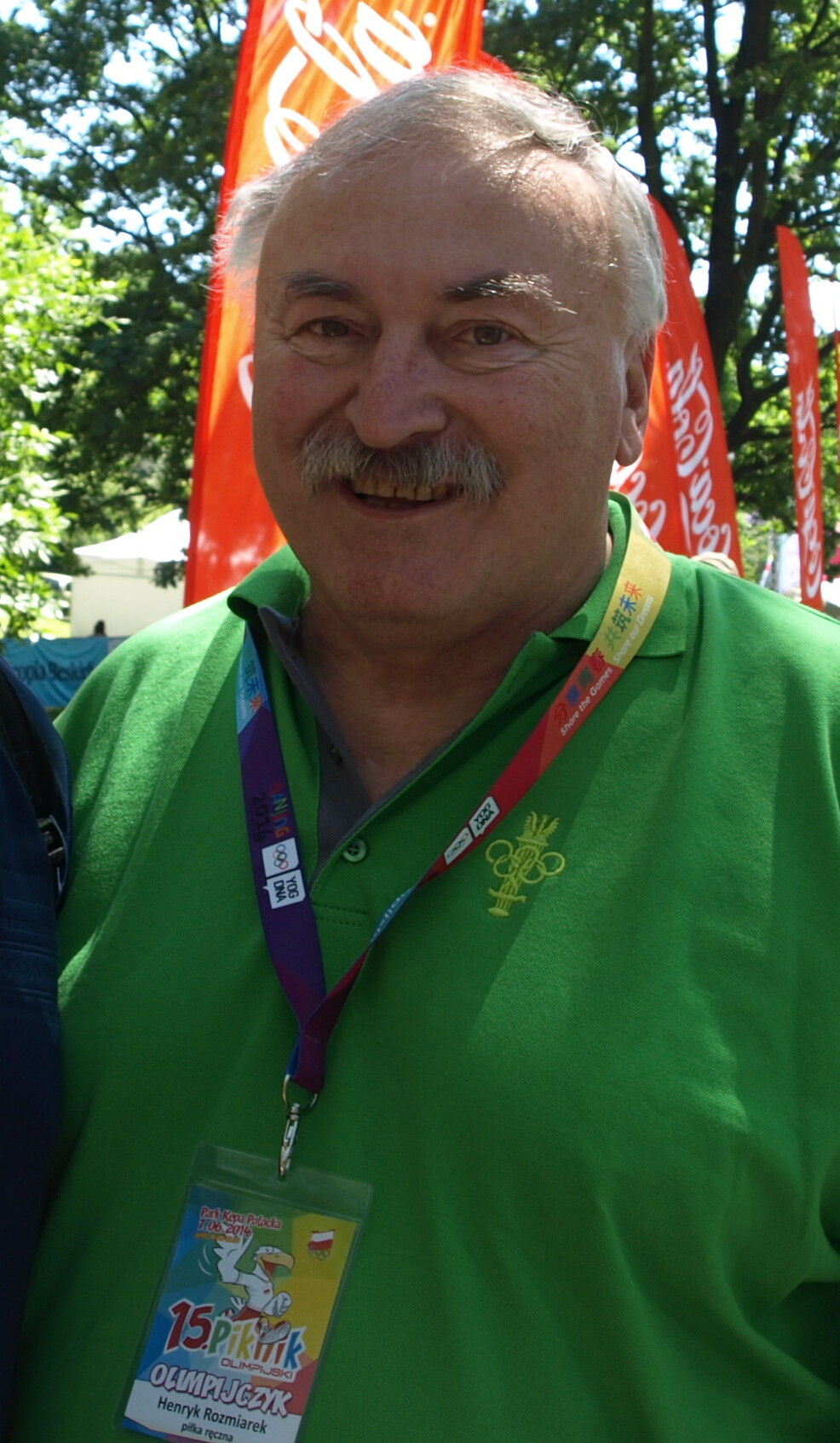

Personal information
- Nationality: Polish
- Born: 13 January 1949 Poznań, Poland
- Died: 10 March 2021 (aged 72)
- Height: 1.80 m (5 ft 11 in)

Sport
- Sport: Handball
- Position: Goalkeeper

Senior clubs
- Years: Team
- 1967–1975: Grunwald Poznań
- 1975–1983: KS Posnania
National team
Years	Team	Apps	(Gls)
1969–1980	Poland	177	(0)
Medal record
Olympic Games
Men's Handball
Bronze medal – third place	1976 Montreal	Team

Henryk Rozmiarek (13 January 1949 – 10 March 2021) was a Polish handball player who competed in the 1972 Summer Olympics, in the 1976 Summer Olympics, and in the 1980 Summer Olympics.

In 1972 he was a member of the Polish team which finished tenth. Four years later he won the bronze medal with the Polish team. In 1980 he was part of the Polish team which finished seventh.
