= Mieczysław Wojczak =

Polish handball player (born 1951)

Olympic medal record

Men's Handball
Bronze medal – third place	1976 Montreal	Team

Mieczysław Jan Wojczak (born 23 January 1951 in Chorzów) is a former Polish handball player who competed in the 1976 Summer Olympics and in the 1980 Summer Olympics.

In 1976 he won the bronze medal with the Polish team. He played one match as goalkeeper.

Four years later, he was part of the Polish team which finished seventh. He again played one match as goalkeeper.
