= Trayan Dimitrov =

Bulgarian fencer

Personal information
- Born: 2 February 1947 (age 79)

Sport
- Sport: Fencing

Trayan Dimitrov (Bulgarian: Траян Димитров; born 2 February 1947) is a Bulgarian fencer. He competed in the individual sabre event at the 1976 Summer Olympics.
