= Adrian Schervan =

Romanian water polo player

Personal information
- Nationality: Romanian
- Born: 28 August 1956 (age 68); Bucharest, Romania

Sport
- Sport: Water polo

Adrian Schervan (born 28 August 1956) is a Romanian water polo player. He competed at the 1976 Summer Olympics and the 1980 Summer Olympics.
