= Grzegorz Ciastek =

Polish gymnast

- Born: 28 April 1955 Warsaw, Polish People's Republic
- Died: 30 October 2007 (aged 52)
- Height: 1.62 m (5 ft 4 in)

Gymnastics career
- Discipline: Men's artistic gymnastics
- Country represented: Poland
- Club: Legia Warsaw

Grzegorz Ciastek (28 April 1955 – 30 October 2007) was a Polish gymnast. He competed in eight events at the 1976 Summer Olympics.
