= Chartchai Juntrat =

Thai cyclist

Personal information
- Born: 27 September 1951 (age 75)

Cycling career
- Sport: Cycling

Chartchai Juntrat (27 September 1951) is a Thai former cyclist. He competed in the individual road race and team time trial events at the 1976 Summer Olympics.
