= Janusz Brzozowski (handballer) =

Polish handball player (born 1951)

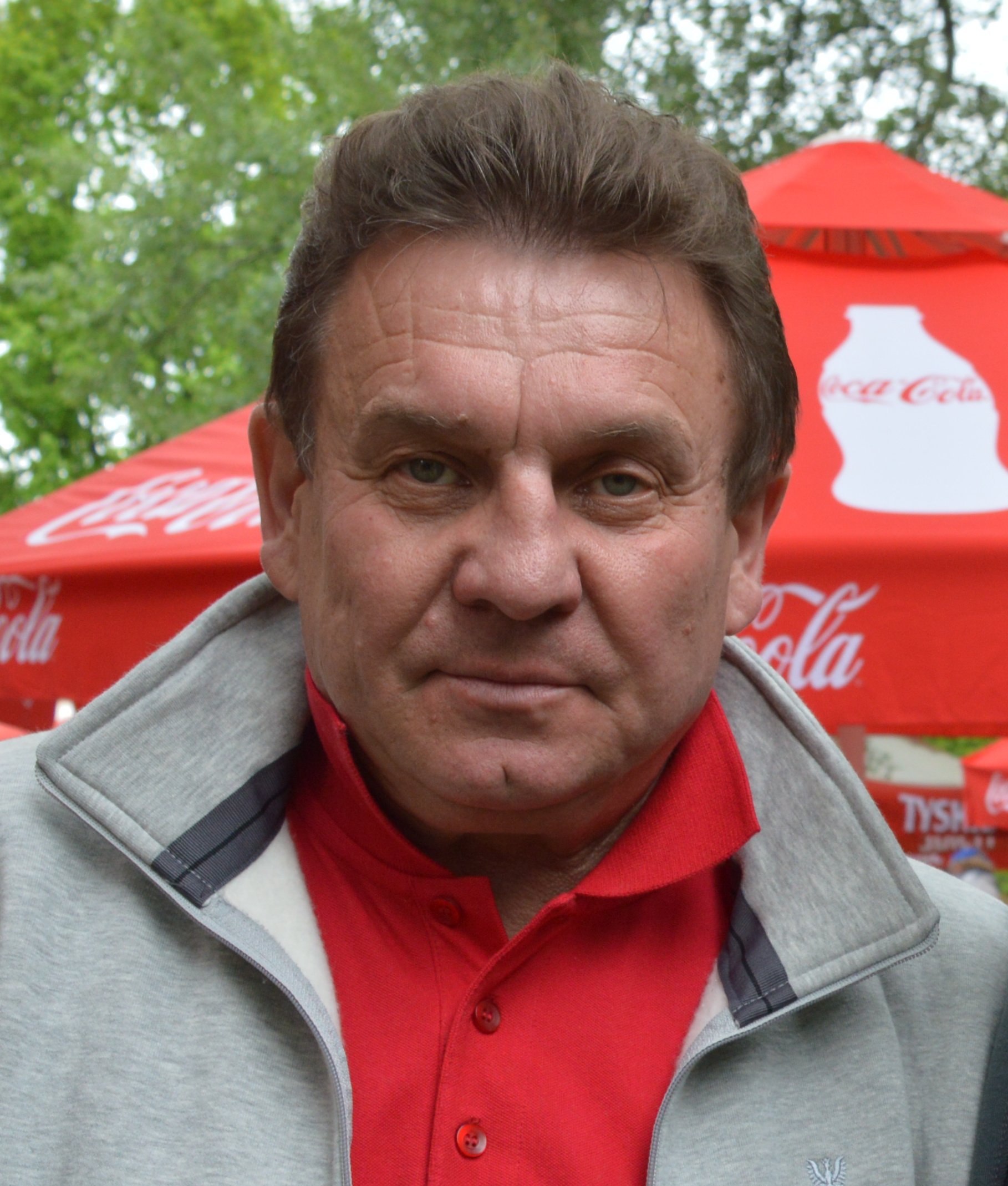

Personal information
- Nationality: Polish
- Born: 29 June 1951 (age 75) Szczecin, Poland
- Height: 1.73 m (5 ft 8 in)

Sport
- Sport: Handball
- Position: Right wing

Senior clubs
- Years: Team
- 1970–1990: Pogoń Szczecin
National team
Years	Team	Apps	(Gls)
1973–1982	Poland	162	(300)
Medal record
Olympic Games
Men's Handball
Bronze medal – third place	1976 Montreal	Team

Janusz Brzozowski (born 29 June 1951) is a former Polish handball player who competed in the 1976 Summer Olympics and in the 1980 Summer Olympics.

In 1976 he won the bronze medal with the Polish team. Four years later he was part of the Polish team which finished seventh.
