= Andrzej Szymczak =

Polish handball player (1948–2016)

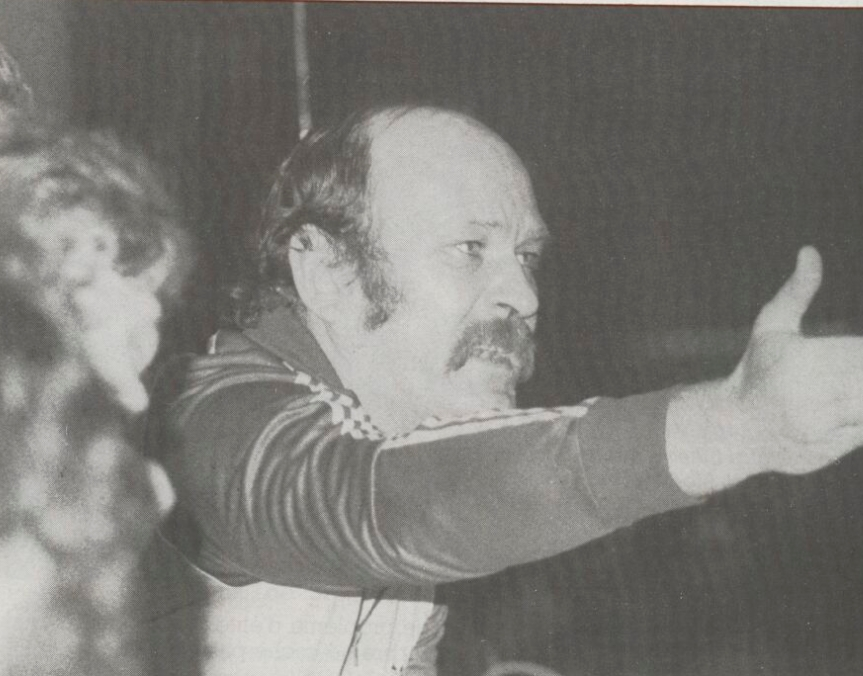
- Andrzej Szymczak (1987)

Personal information
- Nationality: Polish
- Born: 8 September 1948 Konstantynów Łódzki, Poland
- Died: 6 September 2016 (aged 68)
- Height: 1.93 m (6 ft 4 in)

Sport
- Sport: Handball
- Position: Goalkeeper

Senior clubs
- Years: Team
- 1964–1965: Sokół Konstantynów Łódzki
- 1965–1970: Włókniarz Konstantynów Łódzki
- 1970–1971: Śląsk Wrocław
- 1971–1976: Anilana Łódź
- 1976–1980: ASKÖ Linz
- 1980–1984: Anilana Łódź
- 1984–1985: HC Berchem
National team
| Years | Team | Apps | (Gls) |
| 1967–1984 | Poland | 229 | (0) |

Teams managed
- 1985–1989: Anilana Łódź
- 1990–1995: Anilana Łódź
- 1990–1992: Poland (assistant)
Medal record
Men's Handball
| Bronze medal – third place | 1976 Montreal | Team |

Andrzej Szymczak (8 September 1948 – 6 September 2016 in Konstantynów Łódzki) was a Polish handball player and coach. He competed in the 1972 and 1976 Summer Olympics.

In 1972, Szymczak was part of the Polish team which finished tenth in the Olympic handball tournament. He played three matches as goalkeeper. Four years later, he won the bronze medal with the Polish team. He played four matches including the bronze medal match as goalkeeper.

After his playing days he coached Anilana Łódź, and was the assistant coach for the Polish national team between 1990 and 1992.
