= Piotr Cieśla =

Polish handball player (born 1955)

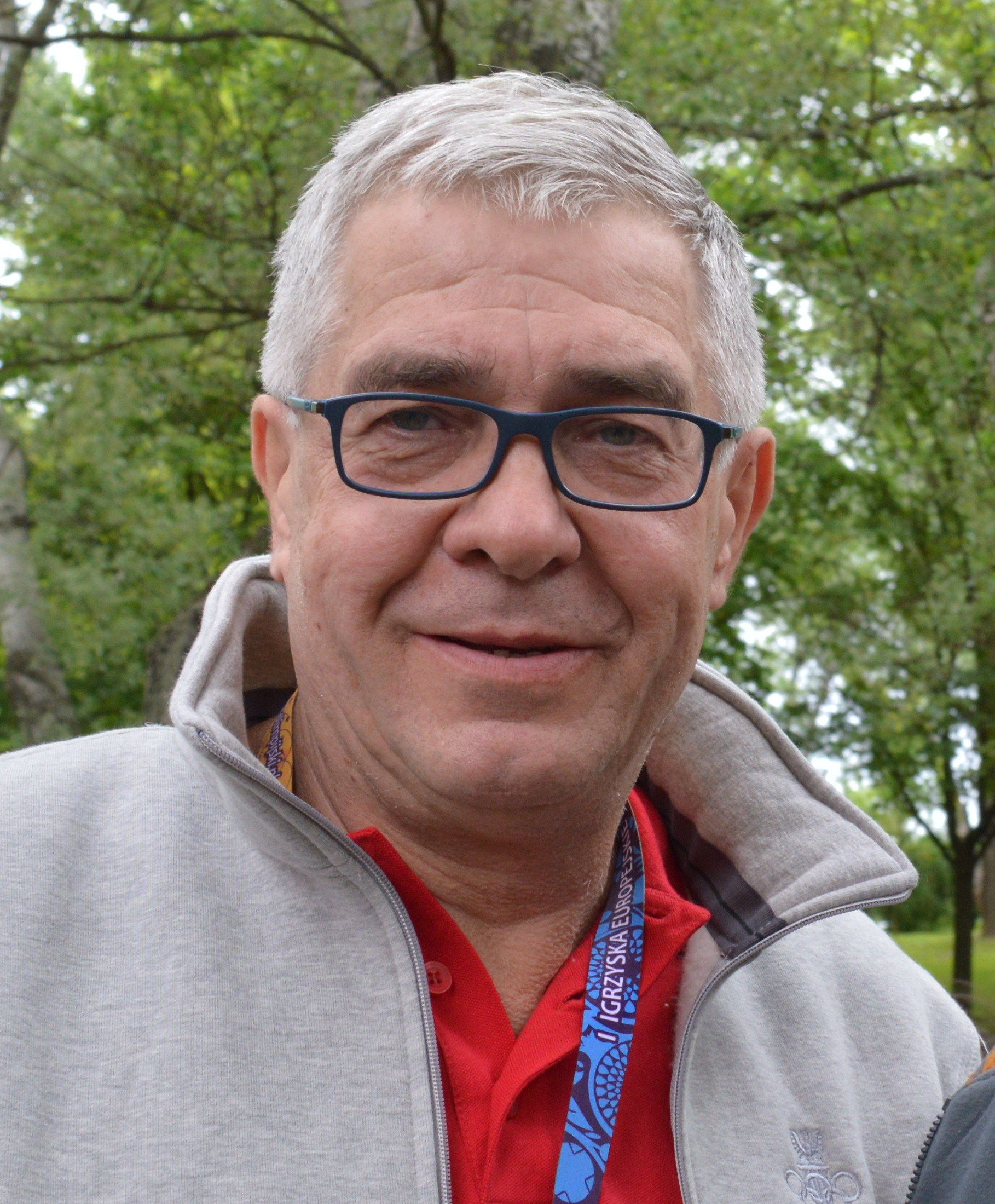

Personal information
- Nationality: Polish
- Born: 16 January 1955 (age 71) Gdańsk, Poland
- Height: 1.95 m (6 ft 5 in)

Sport
- Sport: Handball
- Position: Pivot

Senior clubs
- Years: Team
- 1970–1990: Spójnia Gdańsk
National team
Years	Team	Apps	(Gls)
1976–1980	Poland	51	(20)
Medal record
Olympic Games
Men's Handball
Bronze medal – third place	1976 Montreal	Team

Piotr Józef Cieśla (born 16 January 1955) is a former Polish handball player who competed in the 1976 Summer Olympics and won a bronze medal with the Polish team.
