= Tycho Weißgerber =

German fencer

Personal information
- Born: 10 July 1952 (age 73) Ternitz, Austria

Sport
- Sport: Fencing

Tycho Weißgerber (born 10 July 1952) is a German fencer. He competed in the team sabre event at the 1976 Summer Olympics.
