= Mircea Grabovschi =

Romanian handball player (1952–2024)

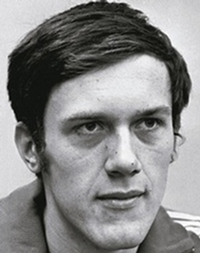
- Grabovschi in the 1980s

Personal information
- Born: 22 December 1952 Sighișoara, Romania
- Died: 23 July 2024 (aged 71)
- Height: 196 cm (6 ft 5 in)
- Weight: 92 kg (203 lb)

Sport
- Sport: Handball
- Club: Dinamo Bucharest
Medal record
Representing Romania
Olympic Games
Silver medal – second place	1976 Montreal	Team
World Championship
Gold medal – first place	1974 East Germany	Team

Mircea Grabovschi (sometimes spelled Grabovski or Grabowski; 22 December 1952 – 23 July 2024) was a Romanian handball player and coach. He won the world title in 1974 and a silver medal at the 1976 Olympics. During his career he played 199 matches for the national team and scored 544 goals.

After retiring from competitions he became a coach, managing among others HC Argeș. He was an avid bridge player.

Grabovschi died on 23 July 2024, at the age of 71.

== Honours and awards ==
- Honored Master of Sport ("Maestru emerit al sportului"), 1976
- Cetățean de onoare ("Honorary Citizen") of his hometown, Sighișoara, 2009.
