= Eli Sukunda =

Canadian fencer (born 1949)

Personal information
- Born: 10 April 1949 (age 77) Windsor, Ontario, Canada

Sport
- Sport: Fencing

Eli Sukunda (born 10 April 1949) is a Canadian fencer. He competed at the 1976 and 1984 Summer Olympics.

== Biography ==
Sukunda began as a track and field athlete. He came 2nd at OFSAA All Ontario championships in the junior 120-yard hurdles. At the 1968 Canadian Junior Track and Field Championships, he came 1st in the 440-yard hurdles.

He attended Wayne State University on a Scholar-Athlete bursary as a track and field athlete. He studied English literature and graduated magna cum laude. In his third year of university, Sukunda met Istvan Danosi, the head coach of Wayne State's fencing program. Sukunda trained under Danosi in 1968, 1969 and 1970. After 1970, Sukunda trained himself. For his master's degree in English literature, Sukunda attended the University of Toronto. While competing for them, he came 1st at the OUAA Fencing Championships in Men's Sabre in 1971–1972 as well as in 1972–1973.

In 1975, Sukunda came 1st in Men's Sabre at the Canada Winter Games. In 1984, Sukunda came 1st in Senior Men's Sabre at the Canadian Fencing Championships. At the same tournament, he came 2nd in Men's Sabre in 1975, 1978, 1981 and 1982. When he was on the national team, Sukunda attended numerous Pan American Games, Commonwealth Championships and World Cups. Individually, Sukunda came 3rd at the 1982 Commonwealth Games. The Canadian Men's Sabre Team came 2nd at the 1978 Commonwealth Games. They came 1st at the 1982 Commonwealth Games. They came 3rd at the Pan American Games of 1975, 1979 and 1983.

At the 1976 Summer Olympics, Sukunda came 32nd in the Individual Men's Sabre. The Canadian team placed 9th in Team Men's Sabre. At the 1984 Summer Olympics, Sukunda and the Canadian team placed 7th in Team Men's Sabre. At the 1988 Summer Olympics, Sukunda was Canada's team captain.

After Sukunda retired as an athlete, he began coaching. From 1977 to 1992, Sukunda was head coach at University of Windsor. His men's fencing team won the overall OUAA Fencing Championships in 1982 and 1986. His fencing teams finished no worse than 2nd in 14 of his 16 seasons. In 1993, Sukunda coached Canada's national Men's Sabre team at the World University Games and in the same year, he became head coach at Carleton University. In 1999 and 2000, Sukunda coached Canada's national Women's Sabre team at the World Fencing Championships. In the 2009–2010 season, Sukunda was named Carleton University's Coach of the Year. His men's and women's fencing teams each placed first overall at the OUA championships. It marked the second OUA title in the history of the Ravens women's program and the men's first championship since 2000–2001. It was also the first time both the men's and women's teams have captured gold in the same year. In the 2011–12 season, Sukunda's women's fencing team at Carleton University placed first overall at the OUA championships. In the 2012–2013 season, Sukunda's women's fencing team at Carleton University placed first overall at the OUA championships. In the 2013-2014 and 2014–2015 seasons, his men's fencing team at Carleton University placed first overall at the OUA championships.

In 1996, Sukunda was inducted into the Windsor/Essex County Sports Hall of Fame.

== Personal life ==
Sukunda is the father of Zachary Sukunda, a professional soccer player.
