= Esmaeil Pashapour =

Iranian fencer (born 1954)

Esmaeil Pashapour Alamdari
Personal information
- Born: 1 May 1954 (age 72) Tehran, Iran

Sport
- Sport: Fencing
Medal record
Men's fencing
Representing Iran
Asian Games
Gold medal – first place	1974 Tehran	Team sabre

Esmaeil Pashapour Alamdari (Persian: اسماعیل پاشاپور علمداری; born 2 May 1954) is an Iranian fencer. He competed in the individual and team sabre events at the 1976 Summer Olympics.
