= Dan Irimiciuc =

Romanian fencer (born 1949)

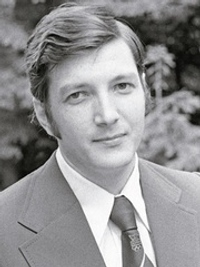

Personal information
- Born: 9 May 1949 (age 77) Iaşi, Romania
- Height: 187 cm (6 ft 2 in)
- Weight: 82 kg (181 lb)

Sport
- Sport: Fencing
- Event: Sabre
- Club: Iaşi Polytechnical Sports Club
- Coached by: Nicolae Pufei
Medal record
Representing Romania
Olympic Games
Bronze medal – third place	1976 Montréal	Team sabre
World Championships
Silver medal – second place	1974 Grenoble	Team sabre
Silver medal – second place	1977 Buenos Aires	Team sabre
Bronze medal – third place	1975 Budapest	Team sabre
Summer Universiade
Gold medal – first place	1977 Sofia	Team sabre
Bronze medal – third place	1973 Moscow	Individual sabre
Bronze medal – third place	1977 Sofia	Individual sabre

Dan Constantin Irimiciuc (born 9 May 1949) is a retired Romanian sabre fencer. He won team silver medals at the 1974 and 1977 World Championships, and team bronze medals at the 1975 World Championships and 1976 Olympics. He was awarded the Romanian Order of "Sports Merit" in 1974 (Class III) and 1976 (Class I).
