= César Bejarano =

Paraguayan fencer

Personal information
- Born: 28 June 1941 (age 85)

Sport
- Sport: Fencing

César Bejarano (born 28 June 1941) is a Paraguayan fencer. He competed in the individual sabre event at the 1976 Summer Olympics.
