= Ahmad Eskandarpour =

Iranian fencer (born 1955)

Personal information
- Born: 25 July 1955 (age 70)

Sport
- Sport: Fencing
Medal record
Men's fencing
Representing Iran
Asian Games
Gold medal – first place	1974 Tehran	Team sabre

Ahmad Eskandarpour (Persian: احمد اسکندر پور; born 25 July 1955) is an Iranian fencer. He competed in the individual and team sabre events at the 1976 Summer Olympics.
