= Sylwester Królikowski =

Polish fencer

Personal information
- Born: 2 October 1950 (age 75) Warsaw, Poland

Sport
- Sport: Fencing

Sylwester Królikowski (born 2 October 1950) is a Polish fencer. He competed in the team sabre event at the 1976 Summer Olympics.
