= Bronisław Bebel =

Polish volleyball player

Personal information
- Nationality: Polish
- Born: 16 May 1949 (age 77); Noyelles-sous-Lens, France
- Height: 191 cm (6 ft 3 in)

Career
Years	Teams
1967–1968; 1968–1977; 1977–1980	Chełmiec Wałbrzych; Resovia; Hutnik Kraków

National team
1968–1978	Poland (199)
Honours
Men's volleyball
Representing Poland
Olympic Games
Gold medal – first place	1976 Montreal
CEV European Championship
Silver medal – second place	1977 Finland

Bronisław Bebel (born 16 May 1949) is a Polish former volleyball player. He was a member of the Poland national team from 1968 to 1978, and won a gold medal in the 1976 Summer Olympics.

== Personal life ==
Bebel was born in Noyelles-sous-Lens. On 11 September 1971, he married Jolanta Rzymowska.

== Honours ==
=== Club ===
- CEV European Champions Cup
  - 1972–73 – with Resovia
- Domestic
  - 1970–71 Polish Championship, with Resovia
  - 1971–72 Polish Championship, with Resovia
  - 1973–74 Polish Championship, with Resovia
  - 1974–75 Polish Cup, with Resovia
  - 1974–75 Polish Championship, with Resovia
