= Juan Gavajda =

Argentine fencer (born 1950)

Personal information
- Nationality: Argentine
- Born: 19 September 1950 (age 75)
- Height: 1.74 m (5 ft 9 in)
- Weight: 72 kg (159 lb)

Sport
- Sport: Fencing
- Events: Sabre, foil

Juan Gavajda (born 19 September 1950) is an Argentine fencer. He competed in the individual and team sabre events at the 1976 Summer Olympics.
