= Stephen Kaplan (fencer) =

American fencer

Personal information
- Born: December 1, 1949 (age 76) New York, New York, U.S.

Sport
- Country: United States
- Sport: Fencing
- Event: Saber
- College team: New York University
- Club: Fencers Club

Stephen Kaplan (born December 1, 1949) is an American former fencer.

== Biography ==
He attended Martin Van Buren High School in Queens, along with Marty Lang, who also became an Olympic fencer.

Kaplan then attended and fenced at New York University, graduating in 1971 with a degree in English. He was an All-American in 1971. In 1996, he was elected to the NYU Athletic Hall of Fame.

He competed for the New York Fencers Club, and won four US national team sabre titles with the club. Kaplan won a silver medal in team sabre at the 1975 Pan American Games.

Kaplan competed in the individual and team sabre events at the 1976 Summer Olympics.

He later coached fencing at NYU from 1980-86.
