= Ilie Slăvei =

Romanian water polo player

Personal information
- Nationality: Romanian
- Born: 4 April 1952; Bucharest, Romania
- Died: 17 June 2025 (aged 73)

Sport
- Sport: Water polo

Ilie Slăvei (4 April 1952 – 17 June 2025) was a Romanian water polo player. He competed at the 1976 Summer Olympics and the 1980 Summer Olympics.
