= Angelo Arcidiacono =

Italian fencer (1955–2007)

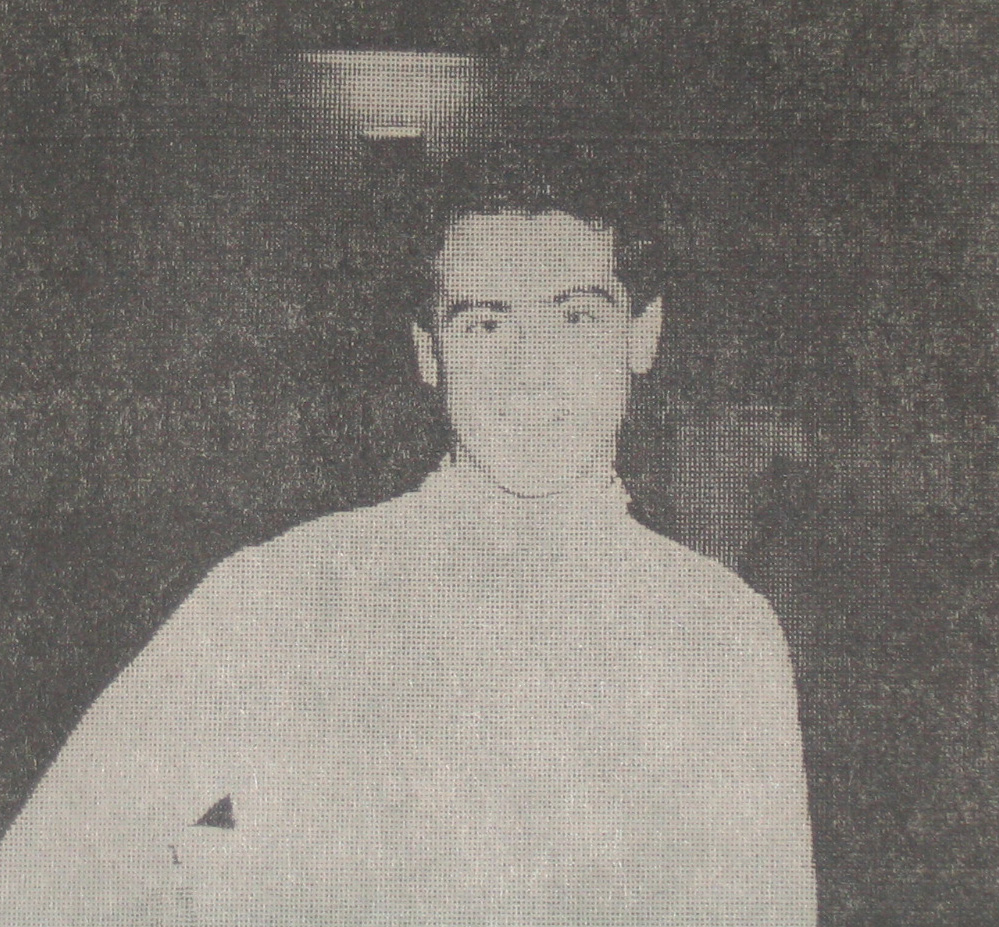

Personal information
- Born: 25 September 1955 Catania, Italy
- Died: 26 February 2007 (aged 51) Catania, Italy

Sport
- Sport: Fencing
Medal record
Men's fencing
Representing Italy
Olympic Games
Gold medal – first place	1984 Los Angeles	Team sabre
Silver medal – second place	1976 Montréal	Team sabre
World Championships
Bronze medal – third place	1977 Buenos Aires	Individual sabre
Bronze medal – third place	1978 Hamburg	Team sabre
Summer Universiade
Gold medal – first place	1981 Bucharest	Team sabre
Silver medal – second place	1977 Sofia	Individual sabre

Angelo Arcidiacono (25 September 1955 – 26 February 2007) was an Italian fencer. He won a silver medal in the team sabre event at the 1976 Summer Olympics and a gold in the same event at the 1984 Summer Olympics.
