= Cornel Marin =

Romanian fencer (born 1953)

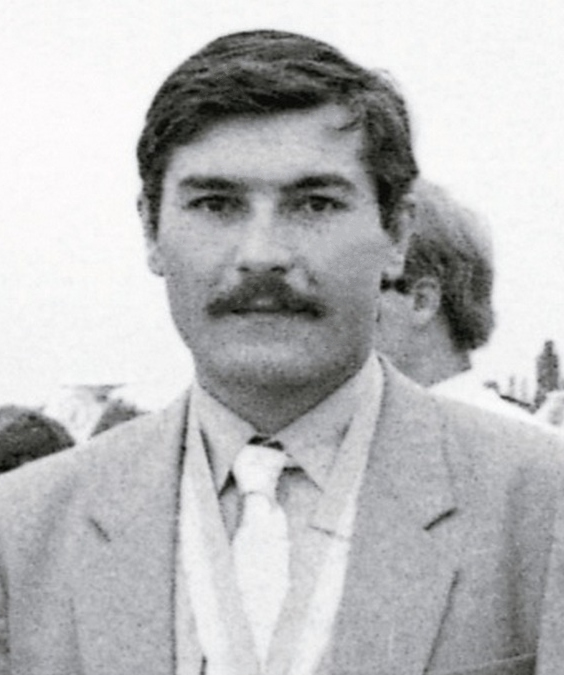
- Marin at the 1976 Olympics

Personal information
- Full name: Corneliu Marin
- Born: 19 January 1953 (age 73) Bucharest, Romania
- Height: 177 cm (5 ft 10 in)
- Weight: 80 kg (176 lb)

Sport
- Sport: Fencing
- Event: Sabre
- Club: Viitorul Bucuresti (1967–72); CSA Steaua București (1972–85)
- Coached by: Lucian Glisca; Dumitru Mustaţă
Medal record
Representing Romania
Olympic Games
Bronze medal – third place	1976 Montréal	Team sabre
Bronze medal – third place	1984 Los Angeles	Team sabre
World Fencing Championships
Silver medal – second place	1974 Grenoble	Team sabre
Bronze medal – third place	1975 Budapest	Team sabre
Silver medal – second place	1977 Buenos Aires	Team sabre
Universiade
Gold medal – first place	1977 Sofia	Individual sabre
Gold medal – first place	1977 Sofia	Team sabre
Bronze medal – third place	1981 Bucharest	Team sabre

Corneliu "Cornel" Marin (born 19 January 1953) is a retired Romanian sabre fencer. He competed at the 1976, 1980 and 1984 Olympics and won team bronze medals in 1976 and 1984. He won three more team medals at the world championships in 1974–1977. In 1977, he was named Best Fencer of the Year in Romania.

As a teenager Marin was trained as a fencer and jeweler. He eventually chose fencing as his profession, and worked as a fencing coach at CSA Steaua București after retiring from competitions in 1985.
