= Romuald Siemionow =

Polish sports shooter

Personal information
- Nationality: Polish
- Born: 31 July 1949 Łapy, Poland
- Died: 17 November 2008 (aged 59) Białystok, Poland

Sport
- Sport: Sports shooting

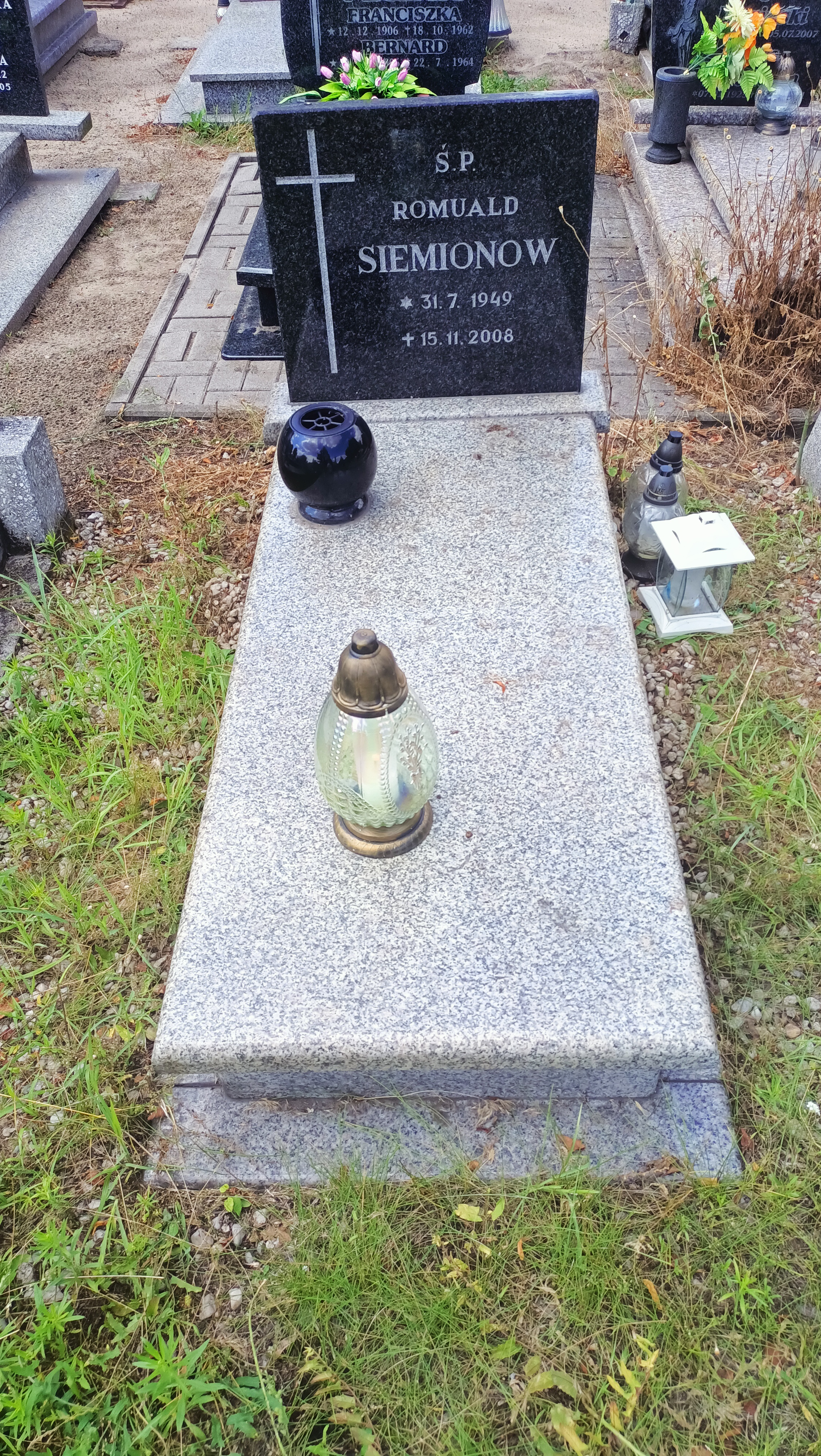
The grave of Romuald Siemionow at the Nowofarny Cemetery in Bydgoszcz

Romuald Siemionow (31 July 1949 – 17 November 2008) was a Polish sports shooter. He competed at the 1976 Summer Olympics and the 1980 Summer Olympics.
