= José María Casanovas =

Argentine fencer (born 1955)

Personal information
- Born: 22 March 1955 (age 71)

Sport
- Sport: Fencing

José María Casanovas (born 22 March 1955) is an Argentine fencer. He competed at the 1976 and 1984 Summer Olympics.
