= Peter Mather =

British fencer (born 1953)

Personal information
- Born: 9 September 1953 (age 72)

Sport
- Sport: Fencing

Peter Mather (born 9 September 1953) is a British fencer. He competed in the individual and team sabre events at the 1976 Summer Olympics. In 1973, he won the sabre title at the British Fencing Championships. Mather studied at Fitzwilliam College, Cambridge.
