= Jolanta Bebel =

Polish fencer

Personal information
- Full name: Jolanta Krystyna Bebel
- Born: Jolanta Krystyna Rzymowska; 4 December 1950 (age 75) Warsaw, Poland

Sport
- Country: Poland
- Sport: Fencing

Jolanta Krystyna Bebel (née Rzymowska; born 4 December 1950) is a Polish fencer who competed in the women's team foil events at the 1972 and 1976 Summer Olympics. On 11 September 1971, she married Bronisław Bebel, a volleyball player and future Olympic champion.
