= Paul Apostol =

American fencer

Personal information
- Born: October 23, 1945 (age 80) New York, New York, United States

Sport
- Sport: Fencing
- College team: NYU-All American, 1966 and 1967. NCAA Champion 1966
- Club: Manhattan Fencing Center
- Now coaching: Ramapo High School 2002 to 2013. Record 140-15

Achievements and titles
- Olympic finals: 8th, 1972, 16th, 1976
- World finals: Veterans World Champion 2006 and 2007
- National finals: NCAA Champion 1966, National Open Champion 1973, National Veterans Champion 2006, 2007 and 2010

Paul Apostol (born October 23, 1945) is an American fencer. He competed in the individual and team sabre events at the 1972 and 1976 Summer Olympics.

A resident of Wyckoff, New Jersey, Apostol has been a fencing coach at Ramapo High School.

== See also ==
- List of USFA Division I National Champions
- List of NCAA fencing champions
- List of USFA Hall of Fame members
