= Anani Mikhaylov =

Bulgarian fencer

Personal information
- Born: 1 July 1948 (age 78)

Sport
- Sport: Fencing

Anani Mikhaylov (Bulgarian: Анани Михайлов; born 1 July 1948) is a Bulgarian fencer. He competed in the individual and team sabre events at the 1972 and 1976 Summer Olympics.
