= Ioan Pop =

Romanian fencer (born 1954)

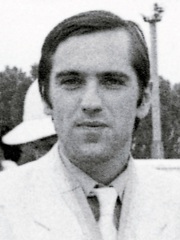

Personal information
- Born: János Pap; 24 October 1954 (age 71) Cluj-Napoca, Romania
- Height: 176 cm (5 ft 9 in)
- Weight: 75 kg (165 lb)

Sport
- Sport: Fencing
- Event: Sabre
- Club: CSM Cluj; CSA Steaua București
Medal record
Representing Romania
Olympic Games
Bronze medal – third place	1976 Montréal	Sabre, team
Bronze medal – third place	1984 Los Angeles	Sabre, team
World Fencing Championships
Silver medal – second place	1974 Grenoble	Sabre, team
Bronze medal – third place	1975 Budapest	Sabre, team
Silver medal – second place	1977 Buenos Aires	Sabre, team

Ioan Pop (Hungarian: János Pap, born 24 October 1954) is a retired Romanian sabre fencer. He competed at the 1976, 1980 and 1984 Olympics and won team bronze medals in 1976 and 1984. He won three more team medals at the world championships in 1974–1977.

Pop took up fencing aged 11 and after retiring from competitions worked as a coach with Progresul Bucharest and the national sabre team. In 1990 he was elected deputy secretary general of the Romanian Fencing Federation. In 1994 he left Romania to train the national fencing team of Tunisia, where his students included Henda Zaouali. In 1997 he became the first technical director of the International Fencing Federation (FIR), and in 2013 was inducted into the FIE Hall of Fame.
