= Manuel Ortiz (fencer) =

Cuban fencer (1948–2008)

Personal information
- Born: 20 May 1948 Havana, Cuba
- Died: 10 February 2008 (aged 59)

Sport
- Sport: Fencing

Manuel Ortiz (20 May 1948 – 10 February 2008) was a Cuban fencer. He competed in the individual and team sabre events at four Olympic Games between 1968 and 1980.
