= Sutipong Santitevagul =

Thai fencer

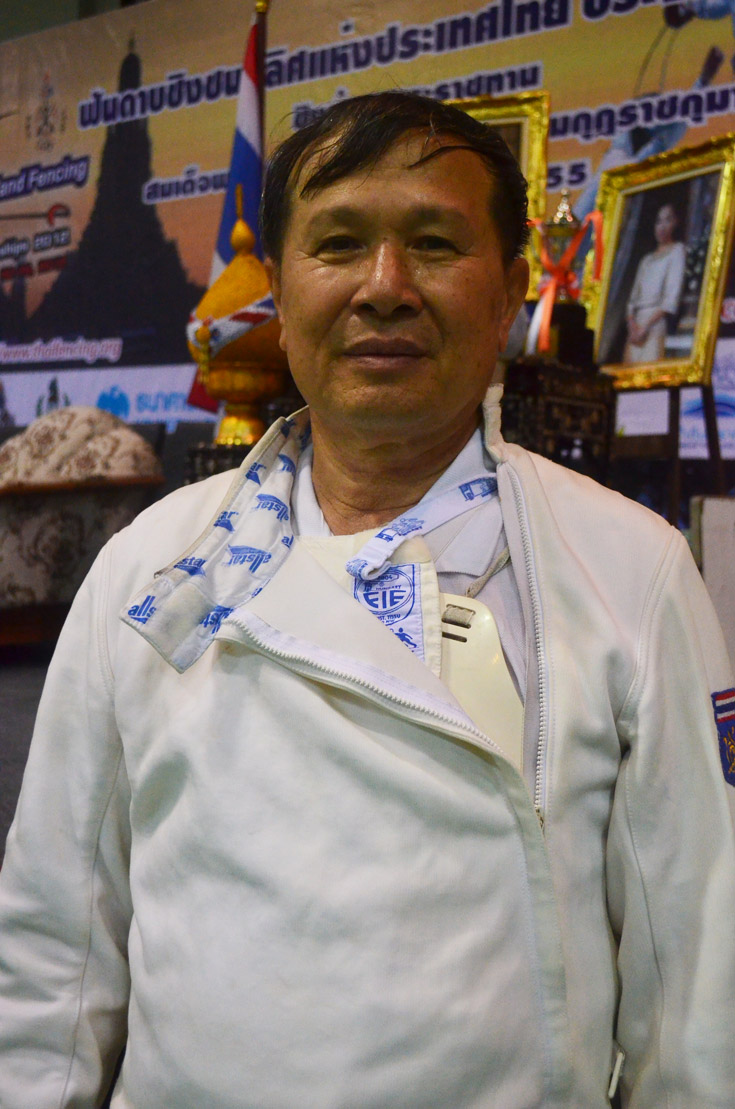
- Sutipong Santitevagul in Thailand Fencing Championship 2012

Personal information
- Born: 8 November 1949 (age 76)

Sport
- Sport: Fencing

Sutipong Santitevagul (born 8 November 1949) is a Thai fencer. He competed in the individual and team épée and sabre events at the 1976 Summer Olympics.
