= Peter Urban (fencer) =

Canadian fencer

Personal information
- Born: 24 February 1938 (age 88) Baja, Hungary

Sport
- Sport: Fencing

Peter Urban (born 24 February 1938) is a Canadian fencer. He competed in the individual and team sabre events at the 1976 Summer Olympics.
