= Jacek Bierkowski =

Polish fencer

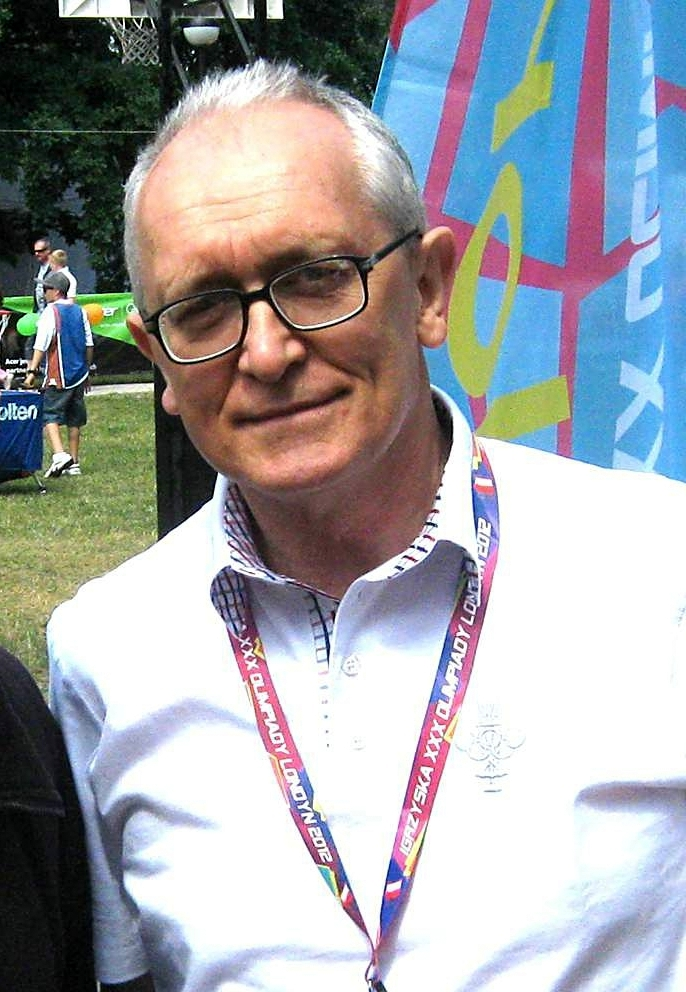
- Bierkowski in 2013

Personal information
- Born: 17 April 1948 (age 78) Ruda Śląska, Poland

Sport
- Sport: Fencing

Jacek Marek Bierkowski (born 17 April 1948) is a Polish fencer. He competed in the individual and team sabre events at the 1976 and 1980 Summer Olympics.
