= Royengyot Srivorapongpant =

Thai fencer

Personal information
- Born: 2 May 1953 (age 73)

Sport
- Sport: Fencing

Royengyot Srivorapongpant (Thai: เริงยศ ศรีวรพงษ์พันธ์; born 2 May 1953) is a Thai fencer. He competed in the team épée and individual and team sabre events at the 1976 Summer Olympics.
