= Philippe Bena =

French fencer

Personal information
- Born: 14 January 1952 Paris, France
- Died: 4 December 2012 (aged 60) Gennes sur Loire, France

Sport
- Sport: Fencing

Philippe Bena (14 January 1952 – 4 December 2012) was a French fencer. He competed in the individual and team sabre events at the 1972 and 1976 Summer Olympics.
