= Patrick Quivrin =

French fencer

Personal information
- Born: 6 November 1952 (age 73)
- Height: 5 ft 8 in (1.73 m)
- Weight: 154 lb (70 kg)

Sport
- Country: France
- Sport: Fencing

Patrick Quivrin (born 6 November 1952) is a French fencer. He competed in the individual and team sabre events at the 1976 Summer Olympics.
