= Leszek Jabłonowski =

Polish fencer

Personal information
- Born: 11 January 1954 (age 72) Kraków, Poland

Sport
- Sport: Fencing

Leszek Jabłonowski (born 11 January 1954) is a Polish fencer. He competed in the individual and team sabre events at the 1976 and 1980 Summer Olympics.
