= Miroslav Dudekov =

Bulgarian fencer

Personal information
- Born: 23 May 1952 (age 74)

Sport
- Sport: Fencing

Miroslav Dudekov (Bulgarian: Мирослав Дудеков; born 23 May 1955) is a Bulgarian fencer. He competed in the individual and team sabre events at the 1976 Summer Olympics.
