= Józef Nowara =

Polish fencer (1945–1984)

Personal information
- Born: 25 February 1945 Kostuchna, Poland
- Died: 10 November 1984 (aged 39) Luxembourg City, Luxembourg

Sport
- Sport: Fencing

Józef Nowara (25 February 1945 – 10 November 1984) was a Polish fencer. He competed in the individual and team sabre events at the 1968, 1972 and 1976 Summer Olympics.
