= Marcelo Méndez (fencer) =

Argentine fencer

Personal information
- Born: 23 March 1956 (age 70)

Sport
- Sport: Fencing

Marcelo Méndez (born 23 March 1956) is an Argentine fencer. He competed in the team sabre event at the 1976 Summer Olympics.
