= Abdolhamid Fathi =

Iranian fencer (born 1948)

Personal information
- Nationality: Iranian
- Born: 10 April 1948 (age 78) Tehran, Iran
- Height: 5 ft 10 in (178 cm)
- Weight: 165 lb (75 kg)

Sport
- Sport: Fencing
Medal record
Men's fencing
Representing Iran
Asian Games
Gold medal – first place	1974 Tehran	Team sabre
Silver medal – second place	1974 Tehran	Individual sabre

Abdolhamid Fathi (Persian: عبدالحمید فتحی; born 10 April 1948), more known as Hamid Fathi, is an Iranian fencer. He competed in the individual and team sabre events at the 1976 Summer Olympics.
