= Régis Bonissent =

French fencer

Personal information
- Born: 2 May 1948 (age 78)

Sport
- Sport: Fencing

Régis Bonissent (born 2 May 1948) is a French fencer. He competed in the individual and team sabre events at the 1972 and 1976 Summer Olympics.
