= Taweewat Hurapan =

Thai fencer

Personal information
- Born: 11 April 1950 (age 76)

Sport
- Sport: Fencing

Taweewat Hurapan (born 11 April 1950) is a Thai fencer. He competed in the individual and team épée and sabre events at the 1976 Summer Olympics.
