= Francisco de la Torre (fencer) =

Cuban fencer (born 1952)

Personal information
- Born: 25 April 1952 (age 73)

Sport
- Sport: Fencing

Francisco de la Torre (born 25 April 1952) is a Cuban fencer. He competed in the individual and team sabre events at the 1972 and 1976 Summer Olympics.
