= Fencing at the 1972 Summer Olympics – Men's team sabre =

Men's team sabre at the Games of the XX Olympiad
- Venue: Exhibition Halls 12 & 20
- Dates: September 3 – 4, 1972
- Competitors: 63 from 13 nations

Medalists
1st place, gold medalist(s)		Michele Maffei; Rolando Rigoli; Cesare Salvadori; Mario Aldo Montano; Mario Tullio Montano	Italy
2nd place, silver medalist(s)		Mark Rakita; Viktor Sidyak; Vladimir Nazlymov; Eduard Vinokurov; Viktor Bazhenov	Soviet Union
3rd place, bronze medalist(s)		Tibor Pézsa; Péter Marót; Péter Bakonyi; Tamás Kovács; Pál Gerevich	Hungary

The men's team sabre was one of eight fencing events on the fencing at the 1972 Summer Olympics programme. It was the fourteenth appearance of the event. The competition was held from September 3 to 4, 1972. 63 fencers from 13 nations competed.

== Rosters ==
Austria
- Hanns Brandstätter
- Bernd Brodar
- Fritz Prause
- Günther Ulrich

Bulgaria
- Khristo Khristov
- Stoyko Lipchev
- Anani Mikhaylov
- Valentin Nikolov
- Boris Stavrev

Cuba
- Hilario Hipólito
- Guzman Salazar
- Francisco de la Torre
- Manuel Ortiz
- Manuel Suárez

France
- Régis Bonissent
- Bernard Dumont
- Bernard Vallée
- Philippe Bena
- Serge Panizza

Great Britain
- David Acfield
- Richard Cohen
- Rodney Craig
- John Deanfield
- Richard Oldcorn

Hungary
- Tibor Pézsa
- Péter Marót
- Péter Bakonyi
- Tamás Kovács
- Pál Gerevich

Italy
- Michele Maffei
- Rolando Rigoli
- Cesare Salvadori
- Mario Aldo Montano
- Mario Tullio Montano

Poland
- Józef Nowara
- Krzysztof Grzegorek
- Zygmunt Kawecki
- Jerzy Pawłowski
- Janusz Majewski

Romania
- Dan Irimiciuc
- Iosif Budahazi
- Gheorghe Culcea
- Constantin Nicolae
- Octavian Vintilă

Soviet Union
- Mark Rakita
- Viktor Sidyak
- Vladimir Nazlymov
- Eduard Vinokurov
- Viktor Bazhenov

Switzerland
- Alain Barudoni
- Sandor Gombay
- Istvan Kulcsar
- Janos Mohoss
- Toni Reber

United States
- Paul Apostol
- Robert Dow
- Alfonso Morales
- Alex Orban

West Germany
- Walter Convents
- Volker Duschner
- Knut Höhne
- Dieter Wellmann
- Paul Wischeidt

== Results ==
=== Round 1 ===
==== Round 1 Pool A ====
Romania and Hungary each defeated Bulgaria, 11–5 and 12–4, respectively. The two victors then faced off. Hungary won 9–3.

Pos	Team	W	L	BW	BL	Qual.	HUN	ROU	BUL
1	Hungary	2	0	21	7	Q		9–3	12–4
2	Romania	1	1	14	14	Q	3–9		11–5
3	Bulgaria	0	2	9	23		4–12	5–11	

Source: Official Report, vol. 3, pp. 267–68

==== Round 1 Pool B ====
Cuba and France each defeated the United States, 9–7 and 11–5, respectively. The two victors then faced off. France won 9–5.

Pos	Team	W	L	BW	BL	Qual.	FRA	CUB	USA
1	France	2	0	20	10	Q		9–5	11–5
2	Cuba	1	1	14	16	Q	5–9		9–7
3	United States	0	2	12	20		5–11	7–9	

Source: Official Report, vol. 3, pp. 267–68

==== Round 1 Pool C ====
The Soviet Union and Italy each defeated Great Britain, 10–6 and 13–3, respectively. The two victors then faced off. The Soviet Union won 9–7.

Pos	Team	W	L	BW	BL	Qual.	URS	ITA	GBR
1	Soviet Union	2	0	19	13	Q		9–7	10–6
2	Italy	1	1	20	12	Q	7–9		13–3
3	Great Britain	0	2	9	23		6–10	3–13	

Source: Official Report, vol. 3, pp. 267–68

==== Round 1 Pool D ====
In the first set of matches, West Germany defeated Switzerland and Poland prevailed over Austria, both 12–4. In the second, West Germany and Austria drew 8–8 (with 57 touches apiece) and Poland won over Switzerland 12–4. In the third round, Poland defeated West Germany 11–5 to secure first place while Austria and Switzerland drew at 8–8 (61 touches apiece), keeping Austria in third place and allowing West Germany to advance in second.

Pos	Team	W	L	BW	BL	Qual.	POL	FRG	AUT	SUI
1	Poland	3	0	35	13	Q		11–5	12–4	12–4
2	West Germany	1.5	1.5	25	23	Q	5–11		8–8	12–4
3	Austria	1	2	20	28		4–12	8–8		8–8
4	Switzerland	0.5	2.5	16	32		4–12	4–12	8–8	

Source: Official Report, vol. 3, pp. 267–68

=== Elimination rounds ===
The final was a rematch of the preliminary round match between the Soviet Union (which had won) and Italy. In this second meeting, Italy won the gold medal by defeating the Soviets 9–5.

Quarterfinals
A1	Hungary	9
B2	Cuba	2
C1	Soviet Union	9
D2	West Germany	4
D1	Poland	2
C2	Italy	9
B1	France	4
A2	Romania	9

Semifinals
A1	Hungary	7
C1	Soviet Union	9
C2	Italy	9
A1	Romania	7

Final
C1	Soviet Union	5
C2	Italy	9
Third place
A1	Hungary	8
A1	Romania	7

Consolation round
B2	Cuba	9
D2	West Germany	6
D1	Poland	9
B1	France	6

Fifth place
B2	Cuba	5
D1	Poland	9
