= Fencing at the 1972 Summer Olympics – Men's sabre =

Fencing at the Olympics

Men's sabre at the Games of the XX Olympiad
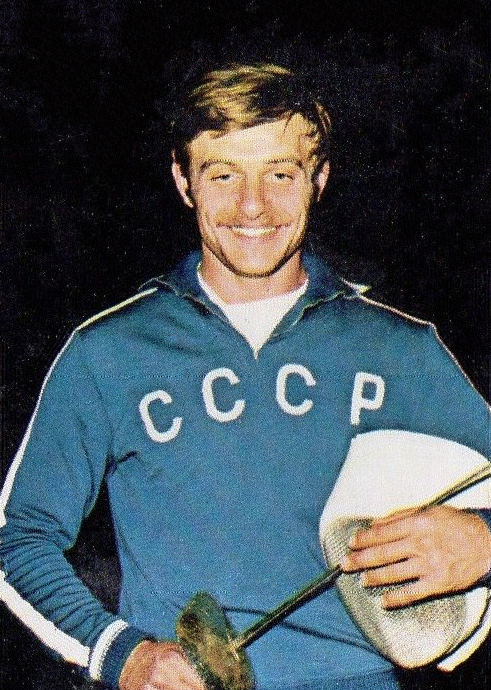
- Viktor Sidyak
- Venue: Exhibition Halls 12 & 20
- Dates: 30–31 August 1972
- Competitors: 53 from 22 nations

Medalists
1st place, gold medalist(s)		Viktor Sidyak	Soviet Union
2nd place, silver medalist(s)		Péter Marót	Hungary
3rd place, bronze medalist(s)		Vladimir Nazlymov	Soviet Union

The men's sabre was one of eight fencing events on the fencing at the 1972 Summer Olympics programme. It was the seventeenth appearance of the event. The competition was held from 30 to 31 August 1972. 53 fencers from 22 nations competed. Nations had been limited to three fencers each since 1928. The event was won by Viktor Sidyak of the Soviet Union, the nation's first victory in the event (tying the nation with Cuba, France, Greece, Italy, and Poland for second-most all-time, behind Hungary's 11). Hungary had lost its nine-Games gold medal streak in 1968 but remained a power in the event; Péter Marót took silver to extend Hungary's podium streak to 11 Games. Another Soviet, Vladimir Nazlymov, earned bronze.

== Background ==
This was the 17th appearance of the event, which is the only fencing event to have been held at every Summer Olympics. All six of the finalists from 1968 returned: gold medalist (and 1956 bronze medalist and 1960 finalist) Jerzy Pawłowski, silver medalist Mark Rakita of the Soviet Union, bronze medalist (and 1964 gold medalist) Tibor Pézsa of Hungary, fourth-place finisher Vladimir Nazlymov of the Soviet Union, fifth-place finisher Rolando Rigoli of Italy, and sixth-place finisher Józef Nowara of Poland. The three world champions since the last Olympics were Viktor Sidyak of the Soviet Union (1969), Pézsa (1970), and Michele Maffei of Italy (1971). The field was thus crowded with top talent.

Hong Kong and Lebanon each made their debut in the men's sabre. Italy made its 15th appearance in the event, most of any nation, having missed the inaugural 1896 event and the 1904 St. Louis Games.

== Competition format ==
After two Games of hybrid pool/knockout play, the 1972 tournament returned to an all-pool format, with each fencer facing the other fencers in the pool in a round robin. Bouts were to 5 touches. There were no barrages; ties were broken by touch quotient: touches scored divided by touches received. Unlike previous Games, all bouts were finished in the round robins. The 1972 format also eliminated the 8-fencer final pools of previous Games; for all rounds after the first, the number of fencers was set at 6.

There were five rounds:

- Round 1 (or "eliminating round"): The 54 fencers were divided into 9 pools, with 6 fencers each (though 1 fencer withdrew, so that pool had only 5). The top 4 fencers in each pool advanced; this narrowed the field from 53 to 36.
- Round 2 (or "1/8 finals"): The 36 fencers were divided into 6 pools of 6 fencers each. The top 4 fencers in each pool advanced, cutting the field from 36 to 24.
- Quarterfinals: With 24 fencers remaining, there were 4 pools of 6 fencers each. Now, only the top 3 in each pool advanced. This split the field in half, from 24 to 12.
- Semifinals: There were 2 pools of 6 fencers each. Again, only the top 3 advanced, resulting in a final pool of 6.
- Final: The final pool featured the remaining 6 fencers.

== Schedule ==
All times are Central European Time (UTC+1)

Date	Time	Round
Thursday, 30 August 1972	8:00 14:00	Round 1 Round 2 Quarterfinals
Friday, 31 August 1972	15:30	Semifinals; Final

== Results ==
=== Round 1 ===
==== Round 1 Pool A ====
Pos	Fencer	W	L	TF	TA	Notes	MM	AO	BS	GS	BB	CM
1	Michele Maffei (ITA)	5	0	25	11	Q		5–2	5–4	5–2	5–2	5–1
2	Alex Orban (USA)	4	1	22	17	Q	2–5		5–3	5–3	5–4	5–2
3	Boris Stavrev (BUL)	3	2	22	15	Q	4–5	3–5		5–3	5–2	5–0
4	Guzman Salazar (CUB)	2	3	18	22	Q	2–5	3–5	3–5		5–4	5–3
5	Bernd Brodar (AUT)	1	4	17	24		2–5	4–5	2–5	4–5		5–4
6	Chan Matthew (HKG)	0	5	10	25		1–5	2–5	0–5	3–5	4–5	

Source: Official Report, vol. 3, p. 252

==== Round 1 Pool B ====
Pos	Fencer	W	L	TF	TA	Notes	MAM	FP	JP	SG	MR	RE
1	Mario Aldo Montano (ITA)	5	0	25	8	Q		5–2	5–1	5–2	5–3	5–0
2	Fritz Prause (AUT)	4	1	22	14	Q	2–5		5–4	5–1	5–2	5–2
3	Jerzy Pawłowski (POL)	3	2	20	15	Q	1–5	4–5		5–3	5–1	5–1
4	Sandor Gombay (SUI)	2	3	16	17	Q	2–5	1–5	3–5		5–2	5–0
5	Mark Rakita (URS)	1	4	13	21		3–5	2–5	1–5	2–5		5–1
6	Robert Elliott (HKG)	0	5	4	25		0–5	2–5	1–5	0–5	1–5	

Source: Official Report, vol. 3, p. 252

==== Round 1 Pool C ====
Pos	Fencer	W	L	TF	TA	Notes	VS	KH	JD	PA	VC	FM
1	Viktor Sidyak (URS)	5	0	25	13	Q		5–3	5–2	5–4	5–3	5–1
2	Knut Höhne (FRG)	3	2	22	21	Q	3–5		4–5	5–4	5–4	5–3
3	John Deanfield (GBR)	3	2	18	21	Q	2–5	5–4		1–5	5–4	5–3
4	Paul Apostol (USA)	2	3	22	20	Q	4–5	4–5	5–1		5–4	4–5
5	Vicente Calderón (MEX)	1	4	20	20		3–5	4–5	4–5	4–5		5–0
6	Fawzi Merhi (LIB)	1	4	12	24		1–5	3–5	3–5	5–4	0–5	

Source: Official Report, vol. 3, p. 252

==== Round 1 Pool D ====
Pos	Fencer	W	L	TF	TA	Notes	DI	SL	WC	RO	GS	YDD
1	Dan Irimiciuc (ROU)	4	1	24	10	Q		4–5	5–0	5–1	5–2	5–2
2	Stoyko Lipchev (BUL)	4	1	23	15	Q	5–4		3–5	5–4	5–1	5–1
3	Walter Convents (FRG)	4	1	20	14	Q	0–5	5–3		5–1	5–3	5–2
4	Richard Oldcorn (GBR)	2	3	16	19	Q	1–5	4–5	1–5		5–3	5–1
5	Guillermo Saucedo (ARG)	1	4	14	22		2–5	1–5	3–5	3–5		5–2
6	Yves Daniel Darricau (LIB)	0	5	8	25		2–5	1–5	2–5	1–5	2–5	

Source: Official Report, vol. 3, p. 252

==== Round 1 Pool E ====
Pos	Fencer	W	L	TF	TA	Notes	TK	CN	PW	RA	FL	RC
1	Tamás Kovács (HUN)	5	0	25	6	Q		5–2	5–1	5–2	5–1	5–0
2	Constantin Nicolae (ROU)	3	2	20	12	Q	2–5		3–5	5–0	5–1	5–1
3	Paul Wischeidt (FRG)	3	2	19	17	Q	1–5	5–3		3–5	5–1	5–3
4	Roberto Alva (MEX)	3	2	17	18	Q	2–5	0–5	5–3		5–1	5–4
5	Fernando Lupiz (ARG)	1	4	9	21		1–5	1–5	1–5	1–5		5–1
6	Richard Cohen (GBR)	0	5	9	25		0–5	1–5	3–5	4–5	1–5	

Source: Official Report, vol. 3, p. 252

==== Round 1 Pool F ====
Skantze did not start.

Pos	Fencer	W	L	TF	TA	Notes	RB	HB	JN	IB	JM	MS
1	Régis Bonissent (FRA)	4	0	20	12	Q		5–3	5–4	5–3	5–2	
2	Hanns Brandstätter (AUT)	3	1	18	13	Q	3–5		5–2	5–4	5–2	
3	Józef Nowara (POL)	2	2	16	14	Q	4–5	2–5		5–2	5–2	
4	Iosif Budahazi (ROU)	1	3	14	16	Q	3–5	4–5	2–5		5–1	
5	Janos Mohoss (SUI)	0	4	7	20		2–5	2–5	2–5	1–5		
6	Michael Skantze (SWE)	0	0	0	0							

Source: Official Report, vol. 3, p. 253

==== Round 1 Pool G ====
Pos	Fencer	W	L	TF	TA	Notes	TP	EH	BV	AM	EB	BF
1	Tibor Pézsa (HUN)	5	0	25	11	Q		5–4	5–3	5–2	5–2	5–0
2	Eddy Ham (NED)	3	2	22	13	Q	4–5		5–1	3–5	5–0	5–2
3	Bernard Vallée (FRA)	3	2	19	12	Q	3–5	1–5		5–2	5–0	5–0
4	Anani Mikhaylov (BUL)	3	2	19	16	Q	2–5	5–3	2–5		5–2	5–1
5	Enrique Barúa (PER)	1	4	9	24		2–5	0–5	0–5	2–5		5–4
6	Bob Foxcroft (CAN)	0	5	7	25		0–5	2–5	0–5	1–5	4–5	

Source: Official Report, vol. 3, p. 253

==== Round 1 Pool H ====
Pos	Fencer	W	L	TF	TA	Notes	VN	JM	PB	MO	IH	HL
1	Vladimir Nazlymov (URS)	4	1	21	12	Q		5–2	1–5	5–1	5–3	5–1
2	Janusz Majewski (POL)	4	1	22	14	Q	2–5		5–3	5–1	5–4	5–1
3	Philippe Bena (FRA)	3	2	20	13	Q	5–1	3–5		2–5	5–1	5–1
4	Manuel Ortiz (CUB)	3	2	17	14	Q	1–5	1–5	5–2		5–0	5–2
5	Ioannis Hatzisarantos (GRE)	1	4	13	24		3–5	4–5	1–5	0–5		5–4
6	Hermilo Leal (MEX)	0	5	9	25		1–5	1–5	1–5	2–5	4–5	

Source: Official Report, vol. 3, p. 253

==== Round 1 Pool I ====
Pos	Fencer	W	L	TF	TA	Notes	PM	RR	AM	FdlT	MA	IK
1	Péter Marót (HUN)	4	1	24	9	Q		5–2	5–1	4–5	5–0	5–1
2	Rolando Rigoli (ITA)	4	1	22	14	Q	2–5		5–3	5–4	5–1	5–1
3	Alfonso Morales (USA)	3	2	19	16	Q	1–5	3–5		5–3	5–2	5–1
4	Francisco de la Torre (CUB)	3	2	22	19	Q	5–4	4–5	3–5		5–1	5–4
5	Mehmet Akpınar (TUR)	1	4	9	22		0–5	1–5	2–5	1–5		5–2
6	Istvan Kulcsar (SUI)	0	5	9	25		1–5	1–5	1–5	4–5	2–5	

Source: Official Report, vol. 3, p. 253

=== Round 2 ===
==== Round 2 Pool A ====
Pos	Fencer	W	L	TF	TA	Notes	TK	RR	IB	AM	SL	FdlT
1	Tamás Kovács (HUN)	4	1	24	13	Q		5–3	5–3	5–0	4–5	5–2
2	Rolando Rigoli (ITA)	4	1	23	13	Q	3–5		5–2	5–1	5–3	5–2
3	Iosif Budahazi (ROU)	3	2	20	15	Q	3–5	2–5		5–2	5–0	5–3
4	Alfonso Morales (USA)	2	3	13	22	Q	0–5	1–5	2–5		5–4	5–3
5	Stoyko Lipchev (BUL)	1	4	15	24		5–4	3–5	0–5	4–5		3–5
6	Francisco de la Torre (CUB)	1	4	15	23		2–5	2–5	3–5	3–5	5–3	

Source: Official Report, vol. 3, p. 253

==== Round 2 Pool B ====
Pos	Fencer	W	L	TF	TA	Notes	MAM	JM	WC	MO	GS	AM
1	Mario Aldo Montano (ITA)	5	0	25	11	Q		5–4	5–0	5–3	5–3	5–1
2	Janusz Majewski (POL)	3	2	21	19	Q	4–5		5–4	5–2	5–3	2–5
3	Walter Convents (FRG)	3	2	19	19	Q	0–5	4–5		5–4	5–1	5–4
4	Manuel Ortiz (CUB)	2	3	19	20	Q	3–5	2–5	4–5		5–2	5–3
5	Guzman Salazar (CUB)	1	4	14	21		3–5	3–5	1–5	2–5		5–1
6	Anani Mikhaylov (BUL)	1	4	14	22		1–5	5–2	4–5	3–5	1–5	

Source: Official Report, vol. 3, p. 254

==== Round 2 Pool C ====
Wischedit (0.889) and Orban (0.850) won the touch-quotient tiebreaker over Oldcorn (0.619) to advance.

Pos	Fencer	W	L	TF	TA	Notes	JP	MM	PW	AO	RO	FP
1	Jerzy Pawłowski (POL)	5	0	25	11	Q		5–4	5–2	5–3	5–1	5–1
2	Michele Maffei (ITA)	4	1	24	10	Q	4–5		5–0	5–2	5–1	5–2
3	Paul Wischeidt (FRG)	2	3	16	18	Q	2–5	0–5		4–5	5–1	5–2
4	Alex Orban (USA)	2	3	17	20	Q	3–5	2–5	5–4		2–5	5–1
5	Richard Oldcorn (GBR)	2	3	13	21		1–5	1–5	1–5	5–2		5–4
6	Fritz Prause (AUT)	0	5	10	25		1–5	2–5	2–5	1–5	4–5	

Source: Official Report, vol. 3, p. 254

==== Round 2 Pool D ====
Pos	Fencer	W	L	TF	TA	Notes	TP	PB	VN	KH	HB	SG
1	Tibor Pézsa (HUN)	5	0	25	16	Q		5–3	5–3	5–4	5–2	5–4
2	Philippe Bena (FRA)	4	1	23	12	Q	3–5		5–4	5–1	5–2	5–0
3	Vladimir Nazlymov (URS)	3	2	22	13	Q	3–5	4–5		5–0	5–0	5–3
4	Knut Höhne (FRG)	2	3	15	22	Q	4–5	1–5	0–5		5–3	5–4
5	Hanns Brandstätter (AUT)	1	4	12	24		2–5	2–5	0–5	3–5		5–4
6	Sandor Gombay (SUI)	0	5	15	25		4–5	0–5	3–5	4–5	4–5	

Source: Official Report, vol. 3, p. 254

==== Round 2 Pool E ====
Pos	Fencer	W	L	TF	TA	Notes	VS	PA	DI	BV	EH	RA
1	Viktor Sidyak (URS)	5	0	25	14	Q		5–4	5–3	5–3	5–1	5–3
2	Paul Apostol (USA)	3	2	20	11	Q	4–5		1–5	5–1	5–0	5–0
3	Dan Irimiciuc (ROU)	3	2	21	16	Q	3–5	5–1		3–5	5–3	5–2
4	Bernard Vallée (FRA)	2	3	18	20	Q	3–5	1–5	5–3		4–5	5–2
5	Eddy Ham (NED)	2	3	14	21		1–5	0–5	3–5	5–4		5–2
6	Roberto Alva (MEX)	0	5	9	25		3–5	0–5	2–5	2–5	2–5	

Source: Official Report, vol. 3, p. 254

==== Round 2 Pool F ====
Pos	Fencer	W	L	TF	TA	Notes	PM	RB	BS	JN	JD	CN
1	Péter Marót (HUN)	3	2	21	16	Q		5–3	4–5	5–3	2–5	5–0
2	Régis Bonissent (FRA)	3	2	18	17	Q	3–5		5–1	0–5	5–2	5–4
3	Boris Stavrev (BUL)	3	2	20	20	Q	5–4	1–5		5–4	5–2	4–5
4	Józef Nowara (POL)	2	3	19	16	Q	3–5	5–0	4–5		2–5	5–1
5	John Deanfield (GBR)	2	3	15	19		5–2	2–5	2–5	5–2		1–5
6	Constantin Nicolae (ROU)	2	3	15	20		0–5	4–5	5–4	1–5	5–1	

Source: Official Report, vol. 3, p. 254

=== Quarterfinals ===
==== Quarterfinal A ====
Pos	Fencer	W	L	TF	TA	Notes	VN	BS	PA	MAM	AM	WC
1	Vladimir Nazlymov (URS)	4	1	24	17	Q		4–5	5–4	5–4	5–2	5–2
2	Boris Stavrev (BUL)	4	1	21	16	Q	5–4		1–5	5–3	5–3	5–1
3	Paul Apostol (USA)	3	2	23	12	Q	4–5	5–1		4–5	5–0	5–1
4	Mario Aldo Montano (ITA)	3	2	22	17		4–5	3–5	5–4		5–2	5–1
5	Alfonso Morales (USA)	1	4	12	23		2–5	3–5	0–5	2–5		5–3
6	Walter Convents (FRG)	0	5	8	25		2–5	1–5	1–5	1–5	3–5	

Source: Official Report, vol. 3, p. 255

==== Quarterfinal B ====
Pos	Fencer	W	L	TF	TA	Notes	TK	JP	RB	MO	RR	KH
1	Tamás Kovács (HUN)	5	0	25	15	Q		5–3	5–4	5–4	5–3	5–1
2	Jerzy Pawłowski (POL)	3	2	19	13	Q	3–5		1–5	5–0	5–0	5–3
3	Régis Bonissent (FRA)	3	2	22	16	Q	4–5	5–1		5–1	3–5	5–4
4	Manuel Ortiz (CUB)	2	3	15	18		4–5	0–5	1–5		5–2	5–1
5	Rolando Rigoli (ITA)	2	3	15	21		3–5	0–5	5–3	2–5		5–3
6	Knut Höhne (FRG)	0	5	12	25		1–5	3–5	4–5	1–5	3–5	

Source: Official Report, vol. 3, p. 255

==== Quarterfinal C ====
Pos	Fencer	W	L	TF	TA	Notes	VS	PM	IB	JN	AO	PB
1	Viktor Sidyak (URS)	4	1	23	15	Q		5–3	5–2	3–5	5–2	5–3
2	Péter Marót (HUN)	4	1	23	16	Q	3–5		5–4	5–3	5–3	5–1
3	Iosif Budahazi (ROU)	3	2	21	15	Q	2–5	4–5		5–4	5–1	5–0
4	Józef Nowara (POL)	2	3	19	22		5–3	3–5	4–5		2–5	5–4
5	Alex Orban (USA)	2	3	16	20		2–5	3–5	1–3	5–2		5–3
6	Philippe Bena (FRA)	0	5	11	25		3–5	1–5	0–5	4–5	3–5	

Source: Official Report, vol. 3, p. 255

==== Quarterfinal D ====
Pos	Fencer	W	L	TF	TA	Notes	MM	BV	PW	DI	TP	JM
1	Michele Maffei (ITA)	5	0	25	14	Q		5–4	5–0	5–3	5–4	5–3
2	Bernard Vallée (FRA)	3	2	20	17	Q	4–5		5–2	1–5	5–3	5–2
3	Paul Wischeidt (FRG)	3	2	17	17	Q	0–5	2–5		5–2	5–3	5–2
4	Dan Irimiciuc (ROU)	1	3	14	16		3–5	5–1	2–5		4–5	
5	Tibor Pézsa (HUN)	1	4	19	24		4–5	3–5	3–5	5–4		4–5
6	Janusz Majewski (POL)	1	3	12	19		3–5	2–5	2–5		5–4	

Source: Official Report, vol. 3, p. 255

=== Semifinals ===
==== Semifinal A ====
Pos	Fencer	W	L	TF	TA	Notes	VN	PM	MM	JP	IB	BV
1	Vladimir Nazlymov (URS)	5	0	25	9	Q		5–3	5–3	5–1	5–2	5–0
2	Péter Marót (HUN)	3	2	20	15	Q	3–5		2–5	5–4	5–0	5–1
3	Michele Maffei (ITA)	3	2	22	17	Q	3–5	5–2		5–3	4–5	5–2
4	Jerzy Pawłowski (POL)	2	3	18	15		1–5	4–5	3–5		5–0	5–0
5	Iosif Budahazi (ROU)	1	3	7	19		2–5	0–5	5–4	0–5		
6	Bernard Vallée (FRA)	0	4	3	20		0–5	1–5	2–5	0–5		

Source: Official Report, vol. 3, p. 255

==== Semifinal B ====
Pos	Fencer	W	L	TF	TA	Notes	VS	TK	RB	PA	PW	BS
1	Viktor Sidyak (URS)	3	2	22	17	Q		5–2	4–5	5–3	5–2	3–5
2	Tamás Kovács (HUN)	3	2	20	17	Q	2–5		5–2	3–5	5–1	5–4
3	Régis Bonissent (FRA)	3	2	17	17	Q	5–4	2–5		5–3	0–5	5–0
4	Paul Apostol (USA)	2	3	18	19		3–5	5–3	3–5		2–5	5–1
5	Paul Wischeidt (FRG)	2	3	16	17		2–5	1–5	5–0	5–2		3–5
6	Boris Stavrev (BUL)	2	3	15	21		5–3	4–5	0–5	1–5	5–3	

Source: Official Report, vol. 3, p. 256

=== Final ===
The final resulted in a clear victory for Sidyak, but a three-way tie for second place. The tie was resolved by touch quotient (touches for divided by touches against), and the three fencers were very close. Marót had the best quotient (21/20, or 1.050) and took silver. Nazlymov had scored the same number of touches, but had been hit once more (21/21, or 1.000) and took bronze. Maffei had the same number of touches against as Nazlymov, but one fewer touch scored than the other two (20/21, or 0.952) and took fourth place.

Pos	Fencer	W	L	TF	TA	VS	PM	VN	MM	RB	TK
1st place, gold medalist(s)	Viktor Sidyak (URS)	4	1	23	15		5–4	3–5	5–1	5–2	5–3
2nd place, silver medalist(s)	Péter Marót (HUN)	3	2	21	20	4–5		5–2	5–4	5–4	2–5
3rd place, bronze medalist(s)	Vladimir Nazlymov (URS)	3	2	21	21	5–3	2–5		4–5	5–4	5–4
4	Michele Maffei (ITA)	3	2	20	21	1–5	4–5	5–4		5–4	5–3
5	Régis Bonissent (FRA)	1	4	19	22	2–5	4–5	4–5	4–5		5–2
6	Tamás Kovács (HUN)	1	4	17	22	3–5	5–2	4–5	3–5	2–5	

Source: Official Report, vol. 3, p. 256

== Final classification ==
Rank	Fencer	Nation
1	Viktor Sidyak	Soviet Union
2	Péter Marót	Hungary
3	Vladimir Nazlymov	Soviet Union
4	Michele Maffei	Italy
5	Régis Bonissent	France
6	Tamás Kovács	Hungary
	Jerzy Pawłowski	Poland
	Paul Apostol	United States
	Iosif Budahazi	Romania
	Paul Wischeidt	West Germany
	Bernard Vallée	France
	Boris Stavrev	Bulgaria
	Mario Aldo Montano	Italy
	Manuel Ortiz	Cuba
	Józef Nowara	Poland
	Dan Irimiciuc	Romania
	Alfonso Morales	United States
	Rolando Rigoli	Italy
	Alex Orban	United States
	Tibor Pézsa	Hungary
	Walter Convents	West Germany
	Knut Höhne	West Germany
	Philippe Bena	France
	Janusz Majewski	Poland
	Stoyko Lipchev	Bulgaria
	Guzman Salazar	Cuba
	Richard Oldcorn	Great Britain
	Hanns Brandstätter	Austria
	Eddy Ham	Netherlands
	John Deanfield	Great Britain
	Francisco de la Torre	Cuba
	Anani Mikhaylov	Bulgaria
	Fritz Prause	Austria
	Sandor Gombay	Switzerland
	Roberto Alva	Mexico
	Constantin Nicolae	Romania
	Bernd Brodar	Austria
	Mark Rakita	Soviet Union
	Vicente Calderón	Mexico
	Guillermo Saucedo	Argentina
	Fernando Lupiz	Argentina
	Enrique Barúa	Peru
	Ioannis Hatzisarantos	Greece
	Mehmet Akpınar	Turkey
	Fawzi Merhi	Lebanon
46	Chan Matthew	Hong Kong
47	Richard Cohen	Great Britain
47	Hermilo Leal	Mexico
47	Istvan Kulcsar	Switzerland
50	Janos Mohoss	Switzerland
51	Yves Daniel Darricau	Lebanon
52	Bob Foxcroft	Canada
53	Robert Elliott	Hong Kong
DNS	Michael Skantze	Sweden
