= Romania at the 1972 Summer Olympics =

- IOC code: ROU (ROM used at these Games)
- NOC: Romanian Olympic Committee

in Munich
- Competitors: 159 (132 men and 27 women) in 16 sports
- Flag bearer: Aurel Vernescu (Canoe/Kayak)
- Medals Ranked 13th: Gold 3 Silver 6 Bronze 7 Total 16

Summer Olympics appearances (overview)
- 1900; 1904–1920; 1924; 1928; 1932; 1936; 1948; 1952; 1956; 1960; 1964; 1968; 1972; 1976; 1980; 1984; 1988; 1992; 1996; 2000; 2004; 2008; 2012; 2016; 2020; 2024

Romania competed at the 1972 Summer Olympics in Munich, West Germany. 159 competitors, 132 men and 27 women, took part in 102 events in 16 sports.

== Medalists ==
Medal	Name	Sport	Event	Date
Gold	Ivan Patzaichin	Canoeing	Men's C1 1,000m Canadian Singles	
Gold	Gheorghe Berceanu	Wrestling	Men's Greco-Roman Light Flyweight	
Gold	Nicolae Martinescu	Wrestling	Men's Greco-Roman Heavyweight	
Silver	Valeria Bufanu	Athletics	Women's 100m Hurdles	
Silver	Argentina Menis	Athletics	Women's Discus Throw	
Silver	Ion Alexe	Boxing	Men's Heavyweight	
Silver	Atanase Sciotnic, Roman Vartolomeu, Aurel Vernescu, and Mihai Zafiu	Canoeing	Men's K4 1000m Kayak Fours	
Silver	Serghei Covaliov and Ivan Patzaichin	Canoeing	Men's C2 1000m Canadian Pairs	
Silver	Dan Iuga	Shooting	Men's Free Pistol	
Bronze	Viorica Dumitru and Maria Nichiforov	Canoeing	Women's K2 500m Kayak Pairs	
Bronze	Ileana Gyulai-Drimba, Ana Pascu-Ene-Dersidan, Ecaterina Stahl-Iencic and Olga Szabo-Orban	Fencing	Women's Foil Team Competition	
Bronze	Ştefan Birtalan, Adrian Cosma, Marin Dan, Alexandru Dincă, Cristian Gațu, Gheorghe Gruia, Roland Gunesch, Gabriel Kicsid, Ghiţă Licu, Cornel Penu, Valentin Samungi, Simon Schobel, Werner Stöckl, Constantin Tudosie, and Radu Voina	Handball	Men's Team Competition	
Bronze	Nicolae Rotaru	Shooting	Men's Small-bore Rifle, prone	
Bronze	Ştefan Tudor, Petre Ceapura and Ladislau Lovrenski	Rowing	Men's Coxed Pairs	
Bronze	Victor Dolipschi	Wrestling	Men's Greco-Roman Super Heavyweight	
Bronze	Vasile Iorga	Wrestling	Men's Freestyle Middleweight	

Medals by sport
Sport	1st place, gold medalist(s)	2nd place, silver medalist(s)	3rd place, bronze medalist(s)	Total
Athletics	0	2	0	2
Boxing	0	1	0	1
Canoeing	1	2	1	4
Fencing	0	0	1	1
Handball	0	0	1	1
Rowing	0	0	1	1
Shooting	0	1	1	2
Wrestling	2	0	2	4
Total	3	6	7	16

Medals by gender
Gender	1st place, gold medalist(s)	2nd place, silver medalist(s)	3rd place, bronze medalist(s)	Total
Male	3	4	5	12
Female	0	2	2	4
Total	3	6	7	16

== Athletics ==
Men's 800 metres

- Gheorghe Ghipu

- Heat — 1:50.1 (→ did not advance)

Men's 1500 metres

- Petre Lupan

- Heat — 3:44.8 (→ did not advance)

Men's High Jump

- Șerban Ioan

- Qualifying Round — 2.15m
- Final — 2.10m (→ 16th place)

Women's Discus Throw

- Carmen Ionescu
  - Qualifying Round — 57.82 m
  - Final — 60.42 m (→ 7th place)

Women's Javelin Throw

- Éva Ráduly-Zörgő

- Qualification — 54.34 m
- Final — no mark (→ no ranking)

== Boxing ==
Men's Light Flyweight (– 48 kg)

- Alexandru Turei

- First Round — Lost to Enrique Rodríguez (ESP), 2:3

Men's Light Middleweight (– 71 kg)

- Ion Györfi

- First Round — Bye
- Second Round — Lost to Peter Tiepold (GDR), 1:4

Men's Heavyweight (+ 81 kg)

- Ion Alexe → Silver Medal

- First Round — Defeated József Réder (HUN), 5:0
- Quarterfinals — Defeated Jürgen Fanghänel (GDR), 5:0
- Semifinals — Defeated Hasse Thomsén (SWE), 5:0
- Final — Lost to Teófilo Stevenson (CUB), walk-over

== Cycling ==
One cyclist represented Romania in 1972.

Individual road race

- Teodor Vasile — 60th place

== Diving ==
Men's 3m Springboard:

- Ion Ganea — 325.17 points (→ 21st place)

Men's 10m Platform:

- Ion Ganea — 265.83 points (→ 25th place)

Women's 3m Springboard:

- Sorana Prelipceanu — 242.61 points (→ 21st place)
- Melania Decuseara — 232.02 points (→ 27th place)

Women's 10m Platform:

- Melania Decuseara — 182.82 points (→ 16th place)

== Fencing ==
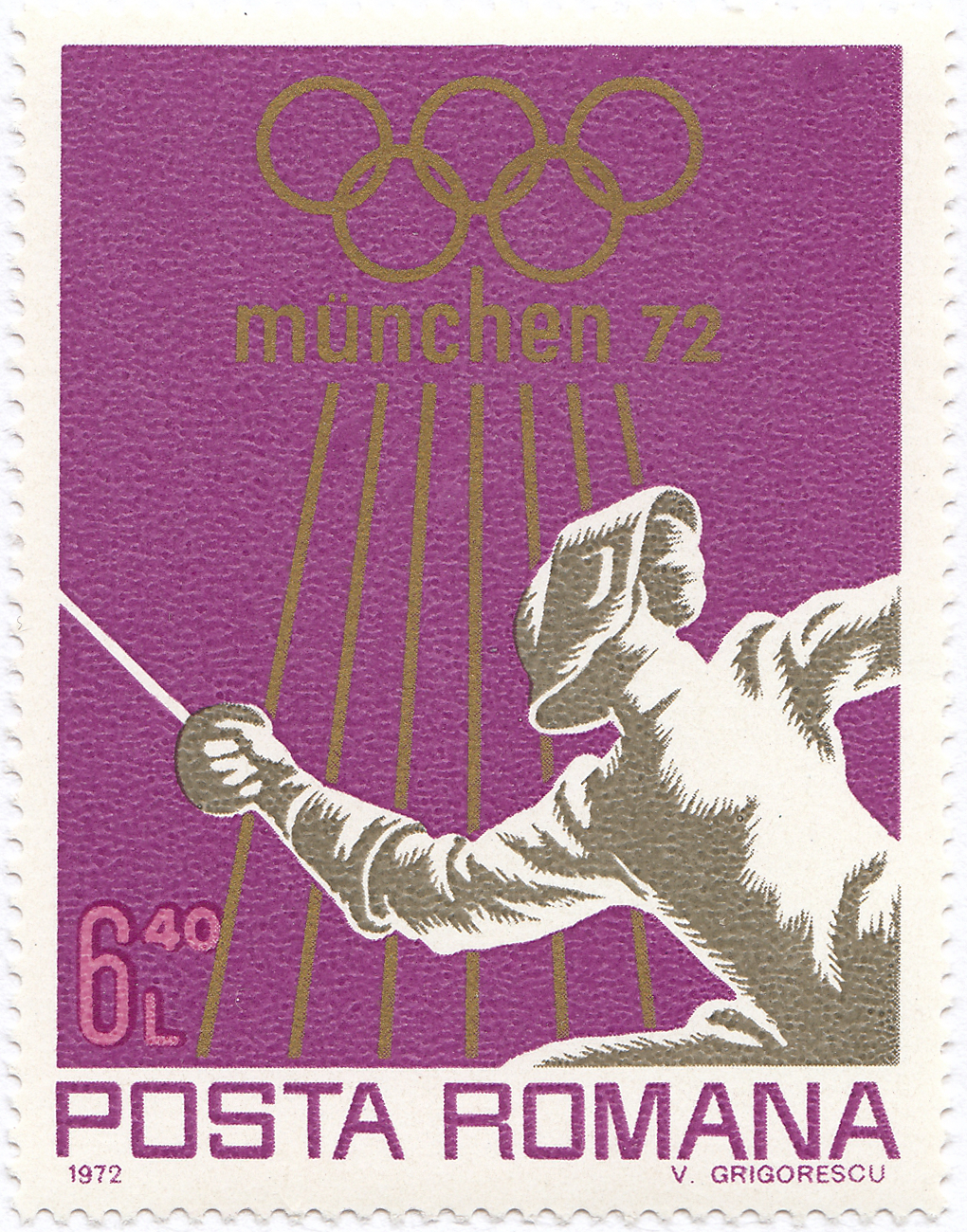
Fencing at the 1972 Summer Olympics on a Romanian stamp

19 fencers, 15 men and 4 women, represented Romania in 1972.

Men's foil

- Mihai Țiu
- Ștefan Haukler
- Tănase Mureșanu

Men's team foil

- Iuliu Falb, Ștefan Haukler, Mihai Țiu, Tănase Mureșanu, Aurel Ștefan

Men's épée

- Anton Pongratz
- Alexandru Istrate
- Costică Bărăgan

Men's team épée

- Constantin Duțu, Costică Bărăgan, Anton Pongratz, Alexandru Istrate, Nicolae Iorgu

Men's sabre

- Iosif Budahazi
- Dan Irimiciuc
- Constantin Nicolae

Men's team sabre

- Dan Irimiciuc, Iosif Budahazi, Gheorghe Culcea, Constantin Nicolae, Octavian Vintilă

Women's foil

- Ileana Gyulai-Drîmbă-Jenei
- Olga Orban-Szabo
- Ana Derșidan-Ene-Pascu

Women's team foil

- Ecaterina Stahl-Iencic, Ileana Gyulai-Drîmbă-Jenei, Olga Orban-Szabo, Ana Derșidan-Ene-Pascu

== Handball ==
Men's Team Competition

- Preliminary Round Group C

- Defeated Norway (18-14)
- Defeated Spain (15-12)
- Defeated West Germany (13-11)

- Main Round Group II

- Defeated Hungary (20-14)
- Lost to Yugoslavia (13-14)

- Final Round, Bronze Medal Match

- Defeated East Germany (19-16)

- Romania - Bronze Medal (5–1–0)
- Team Roster

- Cornel Penu
- Alexandru Dincă
- Gabriel Kicsid
- Ghiţă Licu
- Cristian Gațu
- Roland Gunesch
- Radu Voina
- Simion Schöbel
- Gheorghe Gruia
- Werner Stöckl
- Marin Dan
- Adrian Cosma
- Valentin Samungi
- Constantin Tudosie
- Ştefan Birtalan

== Modern pentathlon ==
Three male pentathletes represented Romania in 1972.

Men's Individual Competition:

- Dumitru Spîrlea - 4754 pts (→ 23rd place)
- Marian Cosmescu - 4890 (→ 38th place)
- Adalbert Covacs - 4381 points (→ 48th place)

Men's Team Competition:

- Spirlea, Cosmescu, and Covacs - 13655 points (→ 12th place)

== Rowing ==
Men's Coxed Pairs

- Stefan Tudor, Petre Ceapura and Ladislau Lovrenschi

- Heat — 7:47.98
- Repechage — 8:08.34
- Semi Finals — 8:10.89
- Final — 7:21.36 (→ Bronze Medal)

== Shooting ==
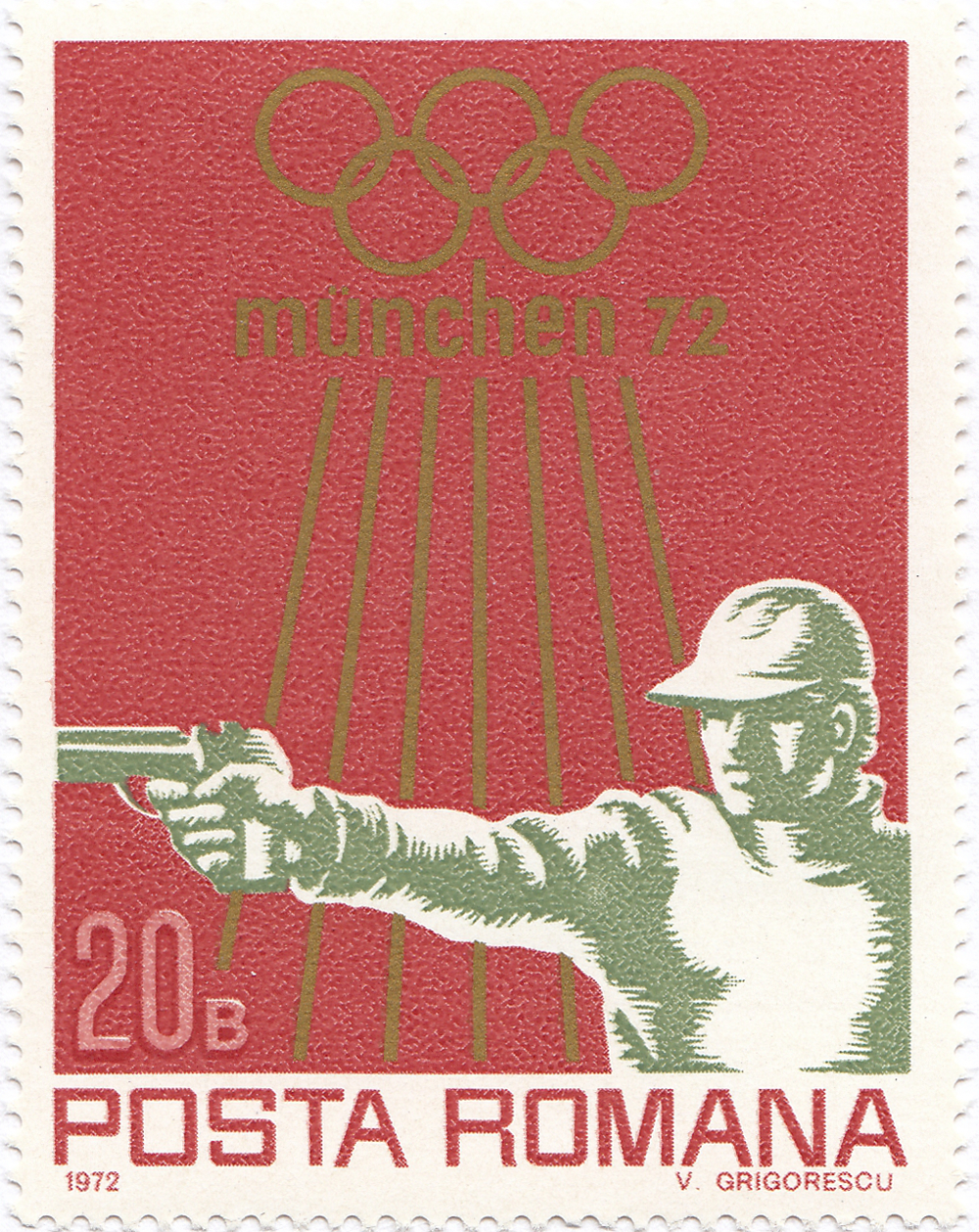
Shooting at the 1972 Summer Olympics on a Romanian stamp

Ten male shooters represented Romania in 1972. Daniel Iuga won silver in the 50 m pistol and Nicolae Rotaru won bronze in the 50 m rifle, prone event.

25 m pistol

- Daniel Iuga
- Ion Tripșa

50 m pistol

- Daniel Iuga

300 m rifle, three positions

- Petre Șandor
- Eugen Satală

50 m rifle, three positions

- Nicolae Rotaru
- Petre Șandor

50 m rifle, prone

- Nicolae Rotaru
- Ilie Codreanu

Trap

- Gheorghe Florescu
- Ion Dumitrescu

Skeet

- Lucian Cojocaru
- Gleb Pintilie

== Swimming ==
Men's 100m Freestyle

- Marian Slavic

- Heat — 55.35s (→ did not advance)

Men's 200m Freestyle

- Marian Slavic

- Heat — 2:00.23 (→ did not advance)

Men's 1500 metre Freestyle

- Eugen Almer

== Volleyball ==
Men's Team Competition

- Preliminary Round (Group B)

- Lost to Japan 0-3 (4, 5, 6)
- Defeated West Germany 3-0 (9,1,8)
- Lost to Brazil 2-3 (-16,11,-7,11,-12)
- Defeated Cuba 3-0 (7,15,13)
- Lost to East Germany 0-3 (-10,-12,-7)

- Final Round (places 5–8)

- Defeated South Korea 3-0 (12, 7, 8)
- Defeated Czechoslovakia 3-1 (-8, 7, 10,14) →5th place

- Team Roster

- Gabriel Udişteanu
- Gyula Bartha
- Cornel Oros
- Laurențiu Dumănoiu
- William Schreiber
- Cristian Ion
- Marian Stamate
- Mircea Codoi
- Romeo Enescu
- Stelian Moculescu
- Viorel Bălaj

== Water polo ==
Men's Team Competition

- Preliminary Round (Group A)

- Lost to United States (3-4)
- Lost to Yugoslavia (7-8)
- Lost to Cuba (3-4)
- Defeated Canada (16-4)
- Defeated Mexico (9-6)

- Final Round (Group II)

- Defeated Spain (7-4)
- Defeated Bulgaria (4-3)
- Drew with the Netherlands (5-5)
- Defeated Australia (5-3) → 8th place

- Team Roster

- Iosif Culiniak
- Corneliu Fratila
- Serban Huber
- Radu Lazar
- Bogdan Mihailescu
- Gruia Novae
- Dinu Popescu
- Viorel Rus
- Claudiu Rusu
- Cornel Rusu
- Gheorghe Zamfirescu
