= West Germany at the 1972 Summer Olympics =

- Flag of Germany
- IOC code: FRG (GER used at these Games)
- NOC: National Olympic Committee for Germany

in Munich
- Competitors: 423 (340 men, 83 women) in 23 sports
- Flag bearer: Detlef Lewe (canoeing)
- Medals Ranked 4th: Gold 13 Silver 11 Bronze 16 Total 40

Summer Olympics appearances (overview)
- 1968; 1972; 1976; 1980; 1984; 1988

Other related appearances
- Germany (1896–1936, 1952, 1992–pres.); Saar (1952); United Team of Germany (1956–1964)

West Germany (Federal Republic of Germany) was the host nation of the 1972 Summer Olympics in Munich. 423 competitors, 340 men and 83 women, took part in 183 events in 23 sports.

== Medalists ==
West Germany finished in fourth position in the final medal rankings, with 13 gold medals and 40 medals overall.

Medal	Name	Sport	Event	Date
Gold	Heide Rosendahl	Athletics	Women's long jump	31 August
Gold	Gerhard Auer; Uwe Benter; Peter Berger; Alois Bierl; Hans-Johann Färber	Rowing	Men's coxed four	2 September
Gold	Konrad Wirnhier	Shooting	Mixed skeet	2 September
Gold	Bernd Kannenberg	Athletics	Men's 50 kilometres walk	3 September
Gold	Klaus Wolfermann	Athletics	Men's javelin throw	3 September
Gold	Hildegard Falck	Athletics	Women's 800 metres	3 September
Gold	Ulrike Meyfarth	Athletics	Women's high jump	4 September
Gold	Jürgen Colombo; Günter Haritz; Udo Hempel; Günther Schumacher; Peter Vonhof	Cycling	Men's team pursuit	4 September
Gold	Detlef Lewe	Canoeing	Men's C-1 1000 metres	9 September
Gold	Christiane Krause; Ingrid Becker; Annegret Richter; Heide Rosendahl	Athletics	Women's 4 × 100 metres relay	10 September
Gold	Dieter Kottysch	Boxing	Light middleweight	10 September
Gold	West Germany men's national field hockey team: Wolfgang Baumgart; Horst Dröse; Dieter Freise; Werner Kaessmann; Carsten Keller; Detlev Kittstein; Ulrich Klaes; Peter Kraus; Michael Krause; Michael Peter; Wolfgang Rott; Fritz Schmidt; Rainer Seifert; Wolfgang Strödter; Eckart Suhl; Eduard Thelen; Peter Trump; Uli Vos	Field hockey	Men's tournament	10 September
Gold	Fritz Ligges; Hartwig Steenken; Gerhard Wiltfang; Hans Günter Winkler	Equestrian	Team jumping	11 September
Silver	Reinhold Kauder	Canoeing	Men's slalom C-1	28 August
Silver	Gisela Grothaus	Canoeing	Women's slalom K-1	30 August
Silver	Hans Fassnacht; Werner Lampe; Klaus Steinbach; Hans Vosseler	Swimming	Men's 4 × 200 metre freestyle relay	31 August
Silver	Klaus Glahn	Judo	Men's +93 kg	1 September
Silver	Heide Rosendahl	Athletics	Women's pentathlon	3 September
Silver	Rudolf Mang	Weightlifting	Men's +110 kg	6 September
Silver	Rita Wilden	Athletics	Women's 400 metres	7 September
Silver	Liselott Linsenhoff; Josef Neckermann; Karin Schlüter	Equestrian	Team dressage	7 September
Silver	Hans Baumgartner	Athletics	Men's long jump	9 September
Silver	Hans-Jürgen Veil	Wrestling	Men's Greco-Roman 57 kg	10 September
Bronze	Werner Lampe	Swimming	Men's 200 metre freestyle	29 August
Bronze	Magdalena Wunderlich	Canoeing	Women's slalom K-1	30 August
Bronze	Gudrun Beckmann; Heidemarie Reineck; Angela Steinbach; Jutta Weber	Swimming	Women's 4 × 100 metre freestyle relay	30 August
Bronze	Adolf Seger	Wrestling	Men's freestyle 74 kg	31 August
Bronze	Hans Lutz	Cycling	Men's individual pursuit	1 September
Bronze	Ludwig Gössing; Horst Karsten; Harry Klugmann; Karl Schultz	Equestrian	Team eventing	1 September
Bronze	Paul Barth	Judo	Men's 93 kg	1 September
Bronze	Joachim Ehrig; Peter Funnekötter; Franz Held; Wolfgang Plottke	Rowing	Men's coxless four	2 September
Bronze	Gudrun Beckmann; Vreni Eberle; Silke Pielen; Heidemarie Reineck	Swimming	Women's 4 × 100 metre medley relay	3 September
Bronze	Peter Hussing	Boxing	Heavyweight	8 September
Bronze	Ullrich Libor; Peter Naumann	Sailing	Flying Dutchman	8 September
Bronze	Wilhelm Kuhweide; Karsten Meyer	Sailing	Star	8 September
Bronze	Klaus Ehl; Jobst Hirscht; Karlheinz Klotz; Gerhard Wucherer	Athletics	Men's 4 × 100 metres relay	10 September
Bronze	Anette Rückes; Inge Bödding; Hildegard Falck; Rita Wilden	Athletics	Women's 4 × 400 metres relay	10 September

== Archery ==
In the first modern archery competition at the Olympics, West Germany entered two men and two women. Their highest placing competitor was Siegfried Ortmann, at 14th place in the men's competition.

Women's Individual Competition:

- Ursula Bueschking - 2200 points (→ 30th place)
- Carla Nolpa - 2165 points (→ 35th place)

Men's Individual Competition:

- Siegfried Ortmann - 2390 points (→ 14th place)
- Richard Krust - 2342 points (→ 30th place)

== Athletics ==
Men's 800 metres

- Franz-Josef Kemper

- Heat — 1:47.3
- Semifinals — 1:48.8
- Final — 1:46.5 (→ 4th place)

- Josef Schmidt

- Heat — 1:47.8
- Semifinals — 1:48.8 (→ did not advance)

- Walter Adams

- Heat — DNF (→ did not advance)

Men's 1500 metres

- Paul-Heinz Wellmann

- Heat — 3:41.8
- Semifinals — 3:38.4
- Final — 3:40.1 (→ 7th place)

- Thomas Wessinghage

- Heat — 3:40.6
- Semifinals — 3:43.4 (→ did not advance)

- Bodo Tümmler

- Heat — 3:44.5
- Semifinals — 3:50.0 (→ did not advance)

Men's 5000 metres

- Jürgen May

- Heat — 14:06.6 (→ did not advance)

- Wolfgang Riesinger

- Heat — 14:15.2 (→ did not advance)

Men's 4 × 100 m Relay

- Jobst Hirscht, Karlheinz Klotz, Gerhard Wucherer, and Klaus Ehl

- Heat — 39.17s
- Semifinals — 38.86s
- Final — 38.79s (→ Bronze Medal)

Men's High Jump

- Hermann Magerl

- Qualifying Round — 2.15m
- Final — 2.18m (→ 4th place)

- Ingomar Sieghart

- Qualification Round — 2.12m (→ did not advance)

== Basketball ==
Men's Team Competition

- Preliminary Round (Group B)

- Lost to Puerto Rico (74-81)
- Lost to Soviet Union (63-87)
- Defeated Philippines (93-74)
- Lost to Italy (57-68)
- Lost to Yugoslavia (56-81)
- Defeated Poland (67-65)
- Defeated Senegal (72-62)

- Classification Matches

- 13th/16th place: Lost to Australia (69-70)
- 11th/12th place: Lost to Spain (83-84) → 12th place

- Team Roster

- Karl Ampt
- Holger Geschwindner
- Dietrich Keller
- Hans-Jörg Krüger
- Dieter Kuprella
- Joachim Linnemann
- Rainer Pethran
- Joachim Pollex
- Norbert Thimm
- Helmut Uhlig
- Klaus Weinand
- Jürgen Wohlers

== Boxing ==
Men's Flyweight (– 51 kg)

- Gerd Schubert

- First Round — Defeated Phar Khong (CMB), walkover
- Second Round — Lost to Orn-Chim Chawalit (THA), 1:4

Men's Bantamweight (– 54 kg)

- Werner Schaefer

- First Round — Bye
- Second Round — Lost to Joe Destimo (GHA), 2:3

Men's Featherweight (– 57 kg)

- Peter Prause

- First Round — Lost to Jochen Bachfeld (GDR), 0:5

Men's Lightweight (– 60 kg)

- Peter Hess

- First Round — Bye
- Second Round — Defeated Enrique Requeiferos (CUB), 4:1
- Third Round — Lost to Svein Erik Paulsen (NOR), KO-2

Men's Welterweight (– 67 kg)

- Günther Meier

- First Round — Bye
- Second Round — Defeated Jeff Rackley (NZL), 5:0
- Third Round — Defeated Sangnual Rabieb (THA), 5:0
- Quarterfinals — Lost to Emilio Correa (CUB), 2:3

Men's Light Middleweight (– 71 kg)

- Dieter Kottysch → Gold Medal

- First Round — Bye
- Second Round — Defeated Bonifacio Avila (COL), TKO-2
- Third Round — Defeated Evengelos Oikonomakos (GRE), 5:0
- Quarterfinals — Defeated Mohamed Majeri (TUN), 5:0
- Semifinals — Defeated Alan Minter (GBR), 3:2
- Final — Defeated Wiesław Rudkowski (POL), 3:2

Men's Middleweight (– 75 kg)

- Ewald Jarmer

- First Round — Bye
- Second Round — Lost to Marvin Johnson (USA), 0:5

Men's Light Heavyweight (– 81 kg)

- Rudi Hornig

- First Round — Defeated Henri Moreau (FRA), 5:0
- Second Round — Defeated Guglielmo Spinello (ITA), 4:1
- Quarterfinals — Lost to Janusz Gortat (POL), TKO-1

Men's Heavyweight (+ 81 kg)

- Peter Hussing → Bronze Medal

- First Round — Bye
- Quarterfinals — Defeated Oscar Ludeña (PER), KO-1
- Semifinals — Lost to Teófilo Stevenson (CUB), TKO-2

== Cycling ==
17 cyclists represented West Germany in 1972.

Individual road race

- Wilfried Trott — 7th place
- Erwin Tischler — 22nd place
- Alfred Gaida — 57th place
- Peter Weibel — 68th place

Team time trial

- Johannes Knab
- Algis Oleknavicius
- Rainer Podlesch
- Erwin Tischler

Sprint

- Karl Köther
- Dieter Berkmann

1000m time trial

- Karl Köther

- Final — 1:07.21 (→ 4th place)

Tandem

- Jürgen Barth and Rainer Müller → 6th place

Individual pursuit

- Hans Lutz

Team pursuit

- Jürgen Colombo
- Günter Haritz
- Udo Hempel
- Günther Schumacher
- Peter Vonhof

== Diving ==
Men's 3m Springboard

- Norbert Huda — 524.16 points (→ 8th place)
- Gerhard Hölzl — 327.42 points (→ 19th place)
- Reinhard vom Bauer — 299.79 points (→ 30th place)

Men's 10m Platform

- Karl-Heinz Schwemmer — 281.55 points (→ 16th place)
- Bernd Wucherpfennig — 267.87 points (→ 24th place)
- Klaus Konzorr — 260.01 points (→ 30th place)

Women's 3m Springboard

- Michaela Herweck — 261.78 points (→ 13th place)

Women's 10m Platform

- Maxie Michael — 183.48 points (→ 15th place)
- Ursula Sapp — 162.39 points (→ 24th place)

== Fencing ==
19 fencers, 13 men and 6 women, represented West Germany in 1972.

Men's foil

- Friedrich Wessel
- Klaus Reichert
- Harald Hein

Men's team foil

- Klaus Reichert, Friedrich Wessel, Harald Hein, Dieter Wellmann, Erk Sens-Gorius

Men's épée

- Hans-Jürgen Hehn
- Reinhold Behr

Men's team épée

- Reinhold Behr, Hans-Jürgen Hehn, Harald Hein, Dieter Jung, Max Geuter

Men's sabre

- Paul Wischeidt
- Walter Convents
- Knut Höhne

Men's team sabre

- Walter Convents, Volker Duschner, Knut Höhne, Dieter Wellmann, Paul Wischeidt

Women's foil

- Irmela Broniecki
- Brigitte Oertel
- Karin Rutz-Gießelmann

Women's team foil

- Gundi Theuerkauff, Irmela Broniecki, Karin Rutz-Gießelmann, Monika Pulch, Erika Bethmann

== Football ==
Men's Team Competition:

- West Germany - Eliminated in Second Round
- First round: 3-0-0
  - Defeat Morocco 3-0
  - Defeat Malaysia 3-0
  - Defeat the United States 7-0
- Second Round: 0-1-2 (Did not advance)
  - Drew with Mexico 1-1
  - Lost to Hungary 1-4
  - Lost to East Germany 2-3
- Roster - Heiner Baltes, Hermann Bitz, Hartwig Bleidick, Hans-Jürgen Bradler, Friedhelm Haebermann, Ewald Hammes, Ottmar Hitzfeld, Uli Hoeneß, Reiner Hollmann, Jürgen Kalb, Manfred Kaltz, Dieter Mietz, Bernd Nickel, Egon Schmitt, Hans-Dieter Seelmann, Rudi Seliger, Günter Wienhold, Ronnie Worm, and Klaus Wunder

== Handball ==
Men's Team Competition

- Preliminary Round

- Defeated Spain (13-10)
- Drew with Norway (15-15)
- Lost to Romania (11-13)

- Main Round

- Lost to Yugoslavia (15-24)
- Defeated Hungary (17-14)

- Classification Match

- 5th/6th place: Lost to Soviet Union (16-17) → Sixth place

- Team Roster

- Herwig Ahrendsen
- Hans-Jürgen Bode
- Wolfgang Braun
- Peter Bucher
- Jochen Feldhoff
- Diethard Finkelmann
- Josef Karrer
- Klaus Kater
- Klaus Lange
- Herbert Lübking
- Heiner Möller
- Hans-Peter Neuhaus
- Uwe Rathjen
- Herbert Rogge
- Herbert Wehnert
- Klaus Westebbe

== Hockey ==
Men's Team Competition

- Preliminary Round (Group A)

- Defeated Belgium (5-1)
- Defeated Malaysia (1-0)
- Defeated Argentina (2-1)
- Defeated Pakistan (2-1)
- Drew with Uganda (1-1)
- Defeated Spain (2-1)
- Defeated France (4-0)

- Semi Final Round

- Defeated The Netherlands (3-0)

- Final

- Defeated Pakistan (1-0) → Gold Medal

- Team Roster

- Wolfgang Baumgart
- Horst Dröse
- Dieter Freise
- Werner Kaessmann
- Carsten Keller
- Detlev Kittstein
- Ulrich Klaes
- Michael Krause
- Peter Kraus
- Michael Peter
- Wolfgang Rott
- Fritz Schmidt
- Rainer Seifert
- Wolfgang Strödter
- Eckart Suhl
- Eduard Thelen
- Peter Trump
- Uli Vos

== Modern pentathlon ==
Three male pentathletes represented West Germany in 1972.

Men's Individual Competition:

- Heiner Thade — 5145 points (→ 7th place)
- Walter Esser — 4826 points (→ 20th place)
- Hole Rößler — 4678 points (→ 27th place)

Men's Team Competition:

- Thade, Esser, and Rößler — 14682 points (→ 6th place)

Alternate Member

- Elmar Frings

== Rowing ==
Men's Single Sculls

- Udo Hild

- Heat — 7:48.12
- Repechage — 7:48.11
- Semi Finals — 8:26.37
- Final — 7:20.81 (→ 4th place)

Men's Coxed Pairs

- Heinz Mußmann, Bernd Krauß and Stefan Kuhnke

- Heat — 8:02.19
- Repechage — 8:07.95
- Semi Finals — 8:19.86
- Final — 7:21.52 (→ 4th place)

== Shooting ==
Fourteen male shooters represented West Germany in 1972. Konrad Wirnhier won gold in the skeet.

25 m pistol

- Helmut Seeger
- Erwin Glock

50 m pistol

- Heinrich Fretwurst
- Heinz Mertel

300 m rifle, three positions

- Dirk Fudickar

50 m rifle, three positions

- Gottfried Kustermann
- Bernd Klingner

50 m rifle, prone

- Silvester Knipfer
- Gottfried Kustermann

50 m running target

- Christoph-Michael Zeisner
- Gunther Danne

Trap

- Heinz Leibinger
- Peter Blecher

Skeet

- Konrad Wirnhier
- Walter Wrigge

== Swimming ==
Men's 100m Freestyle

- Klaus Steinbach

- Heat — 52.91s
- Semifinals — 52.87s
- Final — 52.92s (→ 8th place)

- Kersten Meier

- Heat — 53.96s
- Semifinals — 54.35s (→ did not advance)

- Gerhard Schiller

- Heat — 54.28s (→ did not advance)

Men's 200m Freestyle

- Werner Lampe

- Heat — 1:55.97
- Final — 1:53.99 (→ Bronze Medal)

- Klaus Steinbach

- Heat — 1:55.80
- Final — 1:56.65 (→ 6th place)

- Olaf von Schilling

- Heat — 2:00.27 (→ did not advance)

Men's 4 × 100 m Freestyle Relay

- Gerhard Schiller, Rainer Jacob, Hans-Günther Vosseler, and Kersten Meier

- Heat — 3:37.59

- Klaus Steinbach, Werner Lampe, Rainer Jacob, and Hans Faßnacht

- Final — 3:33.90 (→ 6th place)

Men's 4 × 200 m Freestyle Relay

- Hans Faßnacht, Gerhard Schiller, Folkert Meeuw, and Hans-Günther Vosseler

- Heat — 7:53.98

- Klaus Steinbach, Werner Lampe, Hans-Günther Vosseler, and Hans Faßnacht

- Final — 7:41.69 (→ Silver Medal)

== Water polo ==
Men's Team Competition

- Preliminary Round (Group B)

- Drew with Hungary (3-3)
- Drew with the Netherlands (4-4)
- Defeated Greece (3-8)
- Defeated Australia (6-3)

- Final Round (Group I)

- Drew with United States (4-4)
- Lost to Soviet Union (2-4)
- Drew with Italy (2-2)
- Lost to Yugoslavia (4-5) → Fourth place

- Team Roster

- Gerd Olbert
- Hermann Haverkamp
- Peter Teicher
- Kurt Küpper
- Günter Wolf
- Ingulf Nossek
- Ludger Weeke
- Kurt Schuhmann
- Jürgen Stiefel
- Hans Georg Simon
- Hans Hoffmeister
