= Switzerland at the 1972 Summer Olympics =

- IOC code: SUI
- NOC: Swiss Olympic Association

in Munich, West Germany 26 August 1972 – 10 September 1972
- Competitors: 151 (122 men and 29 women) in 17 sports
- Flag bearer: Urs von Wartburg
- Medals Ranked 26th: Gold 0 Silver 3 Bronze 0 Total 3

Summer Olympics appearances (overview)
- 1896; 1900; 1904; 1908; 1912; 1920; 1924; 1928; 1932; 1936; 1948; 1952; 1956; 1960; 1964; 1968; 1972; 1976; 1980; 1984; 1988; 1992; 1996; 2000; 2004; 2008; 2012; 2016; 2020; 2024

Other related appearances
- 1906 Intercalated Games

Switzerland competed at the 1972 Summer Olympics in Munich, West Germany. 151 competitors, 122 men and 29 women, took part in 116 events in 17 sports.

== Medalists ==
Medal	Name	Sport	Event	Date
Silver	Xaver Kurmann	Cycling	Individual Pursuit	
Silver	Alfred Bachmann; Heinrich Fischer	Rowing	Men's coxless pair	September 2
Silver	Guy Evéquoz; Daniel Giger; Christian Kauter; Peter Lötscher; François Suchanecki	Fencing	Men's team épée	September 9

== Archery ==
In the first modern archery competition at the Olympics, Switzerland entered three men and just one woman. Their highest placing competitor was Lucien Trepper, positioned at 10th place in the men's competition.

Men's Individual Competition:

- Lucien Trepper – 2409 points (→ 10th place)
- Jakob Wolfensberger – 2367 points (→ 22nd place)
- Jean-Pierre Heritier – 2222 points (→ 47th place)

Women's Individual Competition:

- Sally Svendlin – 2191 points (33rd place)

== Athletics ==
Men's 800 metres

- Rolf Gysin

- Heat — 1:47.5
- Semifinals — 1:48.2 (→ did not advance)

Men's 1500 metres

- Werner Meier

- Heat — 3:43.2 (→ did not advance)

Men's 5000 metres

- Fritz Rügsegger

- Heat — 14:54.4 (→ did not advance)

Men's High Jump

- Michel Patry

- Qualification Round — 2.09m (→ did not advance)

== Cycling ==
Ten cyclists represented Switzerland in 1972.

Individual road race

- Bruno Hubschmid — 19th place
- Iwan Schmid — 20th place
- Ueli Sutter — 24th place
- Hugo Schär — did not finish (→ no ranking)

Team time trial

- Gilbert Bischoff
- Bruno Hubschmid
- Roland Schär
- Ueli Sutter

1000m time trial

- Christian Brunner

- Final — 1:07.71 (→ 7th place)

Individual pursuit

- Xaver Kurmann

Team pursuit

- Martin Steger
- Xaver Kurmann
- René Savary
- Christian Brunner

== Diving ==
Men's 10m Platform

- Sandro Rossi — 225.87 points (→ 35th place)

== Fencing ==
12 fencers, 10 men and 2 women, represented Switzerland in 1972.

Men's épée

- Daniel Giger
- Peter Lötscher
- Christian Kauter

Men's team épée

- Guy Evéquoz, Peter Lötscher, Daniel Giger, Christian Kauter, François Suchanecki

Men's sabre

- Sandor Gombay
- Janos Mohoss
- Istvan Kulcsar

Men's team sabre

- Alain Barudoni, Sandor Gombay, Istvan Kulcsar, Janos Mohoss, Toni Reber

Women's foil

- Fabienne Regamey
- Madeleine Heitz

== Modern pentathlon ==
Three male pentathletes represented Switzerland in 1972.

Men's Individual Competition:

- Hans Müller — 4392 points (→ 45th place)
- Beat Ganz — 4323 points (→ 51st place)
- Urs Hugi — 4661 points (→ 28th place)

Men's Team Competition:

- Müller, Ganz, and Hugi — 13359 points (→ 15th place)

Alternate member

- Rudolf Steiner

== Rowing ==
Men's Single Sculls

- Melchior Bürgin

- Heat — 8:00.20
- Repechage — 8:04.81
- Semi Finals — 8:16.95
- Final — 7:31.99 (→ 6th place)

Men's Coxed Pairs

- René Furler, Nicolas Lindecker and Stefan Hablützel

- Heat — 7:46.03
- Repechage — 8:11.53
- Semi Finals — 8:32.34
- B-Final — 8:05.54 (→ 12th place)

== Shooting ==
Eight male shooters represented Switzerland.

25 m pistol

- Paul Buser
- Kurt Rey

300 m rifle, three positions

- Martin Truttmann
- Andreas Beyeler

50 m rifle, three positions

- Erwin Vogt
- Martin Truttmann

50 m rifle, prone

- Erwin Vogt
- Theo Ditzler

Trap

- Paul Vittet
- Vincenzo Lucchini

== Swimming ==
Men's 100m Freestyle

- Hanspeter Würmli

- Heat — 55.08s (→ did not advance)

Men's 200m Freestyle

- Hanspeter Würmli

- Heat — 2:03.14 (→ did not advance)
