= Janusz Majewski =

Janusz Majewski may refer to:

- Janusz Majewski (director) (1931–2024), Polish film director
- Janusz Majewski (fencer) (1940–2025), Polish Olympic fencer
