= Shooting at the 1972 Summer Olympics – Mixed 300 metre free rifle, three positions =

Olympic shooting event

Shooting at the 1972 Summer Olympics – 300 metre free rifle at the Games of the XX Olympiad
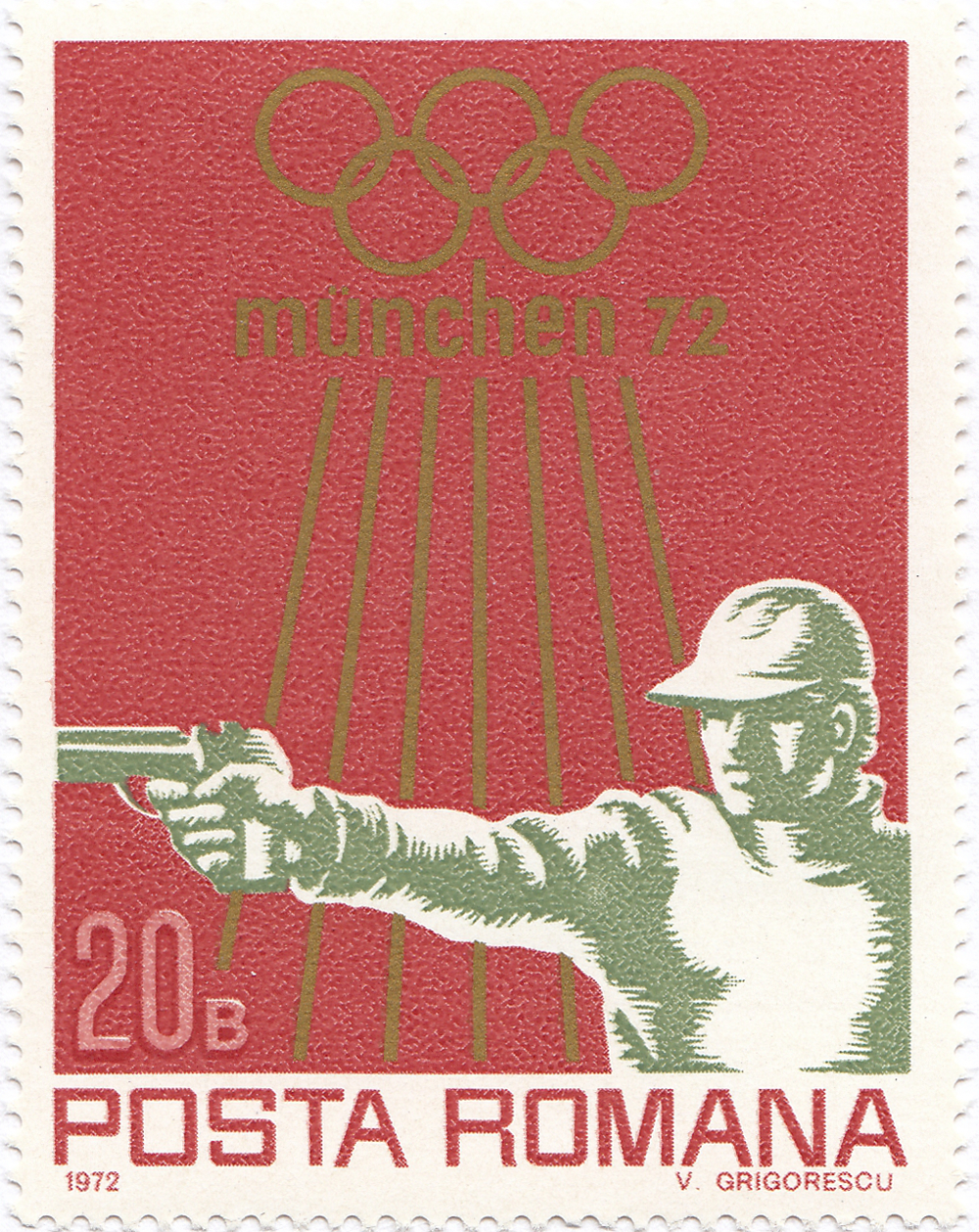
- Romanian stamp commemorating shooting at the 1972 Summer Olympics
- Venue: Schießanlage
- Date: September 2, 1972
- Competitors: 33 from 20 nations
- Winning score: 1155

Medalists
1st place, gold medalist(s)		Lones Wigger; United States
2nd place, silver medalist(s)		Boris Melnik; Soviet Union
3rd place, bronze medalist(s)		Lajos Papp; Hungary

The mixed 300 m rifle three positions was an event at the 1972 Summer Olympics. This was the final time that free rifle was contested at the Olympics. Soviet shooter Boris Melnik was leading 1155 to 1154 when the unofficial scores were posted, but the official scoring brought American Lones Wigger up to 1155; Wigger won the tie breaker with a better score on the last string fired kneeling, 97, versus 96 for Melnik. It was the third consecutive victory in the event for the United States; the Soviet Union had taken at least one medal each of the six times it competed before the event was discontinued after 1972. Lajos Papp of Hungary took bronze.

== Background ==
This was the 11th appearance of the 300 metre three-positions rifle event, which was held 11 times between 1900 and 1972. Three of the top 10 shooters from 1964 returned: silver medalist Valentin Kornev of the Soviet Union, eighth-place finisher Petre Șandor of Romania, and tenth-place finisher Lajos Papp of Hungary. Kornev was the reigning (1970) world champion.

Cuba, North Korea, Paraguay, and West Germany each made its debut in the event. Finland, Sweden, and the United States each made their 10th appearance, tied for most of all nations.

== Competition format ==
The competition had each shooter fire 120 shots, 40 shots in each position (prone, standing, and kneeling). Shots were fired in series of 10. The target was 1 metre in diameter, with 10 scoring rings; targets were set at a distance of 300 metres. Thus, the maximum score possible was 1200 points. Any rifle could be used. All ties were broken by the best score on the final string of kneeling, if still tied the best score on the final string of standing, followed by prone.

== Records ==
Prior to the competition, the existing world and Olympic records were as follows.

World record	Gary Anderson (USA)	1157	Mexico City, Mexico	23 October 1968
Olympic record	Gary Anderson (USA)	1157	Mexico City, Mexico	23 October 1968

No new world or Olympic records were set during the competition.

== Schedule ==
All times are Central European Time (UTC+1)

Date	Time	Round
Sunday, 2 September 1972	9:00	Final

== Results ==
Rank	Shooter	Nation	Position	Series				Total	Score
Rank	Shooter	Nation	Position	1	2	3	4	Total	Score
1st place, gold medalist(s)	Lones Wigger	United States	Prone	97	99	98	100	394	1155
1st place, gold medalist(s)	Lones Wigger	United States	Standing	95	96	93	95	379	1155
1st place, gold medalist(s)	Lones Wigger	United States	Kneeling	95	95	95	97	382	1155
2nd place, silver medalist(s)	Boris Melnik	Soviet Union	Prone	98	98	99	99	394	1155
2nd place, silver medalist(s)	Boris Melnik	Soviet Union	Standing	93	94	95	92	374	1155
2nd place, silver medalist(s)	Boris Melnik	Soviet Union	Kneeling	93	99	99	96	387	1155
3rd place, bronze medalist(s)	Lajos Papp	Hungary	Prone	100	99	99	96	394	1149
3rd place, bronze medalist(s)	Lajos Papp	Hungary	Standing	90	92	89	93	364	1149
3rd place, bronze medalist(s)	Lajos Papp	Hungary	Kneeling	99	94	99	99	391	1149
4	Uto Wunderlich	East Germany	Prone	99	98	97	99	393	1149
4	Uto Wunderlich	East Germany	Standing	91	93	90	94	368	1149
4	Uto Wunderlich	East Germany	Kneeling	97	97	96	98	388	1149
5	Karel Bulan	Czechoslovakia	Prone	98	99	99	98	394	1146
5	Karel Bulan	Czechoslovakia	Standing	92	94	92	92	370	1146
5	Karel Bulan	Czechoslovakia	Kneeling	94	96	94	98	382	1146
6	Jaakko Minkkinen	Finland	Prone	100	99	100	97	396	1146
6	Jaakko Minkkinen	Finland	Standing	89	91	96	88	364	1146
6	Jaakko Minkkinen	Finland	Kneeling	96	98	98	94	386	1146
7	Lanny Bassham	United States	Prone	98	96	97	98	389	1144
7	Lanny Bassham	United States	Standing	92	94	89	93	368	1144
7	Lanny Bassham	United States	Kneeling	96	96	97	98	387	1144
8	Valentin Kornev	Soviet Union	Prone	97	97	98	99	391	1143
8	Valentin Kornev	Soviet Union	Standing	89	92	93	91	365	1143
8	Valentin Kornev	Soviet Union	Kneeling	96	99	96	96	387	1143
9	Werner Lippoldt	East Germany	Prone	98	97	97	95	387	1141
9	Werner Lippoldt	East Germany	Standing	93	91	91	90	365	1141
9	Werner Lippoldt	East Germany	Kneeling	95	98	97	99	389	1141
10	Martin Truttmann	Switzerland	Prone	100	98	95	97	390	1141
10	Martin Truttmann	Switzerland	Standing	95	90	92	89	366	1141
10	Martin Truttmann	Switzerland	Kneeling	99	98	95	93	385	1141
11	Béla Nagy	Hungary	Prone	100	97	99	98	394	1140
11	Béla Nagy	Hungary	Standing	93	84	89	92	358	1140
11	Béla Nagy	Hungary	Kneeling	99	95	98	96	388	1140
12	Malcolm Cooper	Great Britain	Prone	97	99	99	96	391	1139
12	Malcolm Cooper	Great Britain	Standing	91	91	93	86	361	1139
12	Malcolm Cooper	Great Britain	Kneeling	97	97	97	96	387	1139
13	Miguel Valdes	Cuba	Prone	97	100	100	97	394	1139
13	Miguel Valdes	Cuba	Standing	90	89	96	94	369	1139
13	Miguel Valdes	Cuba	Kneeling	94	97	91	94	376	1139
14	Rudolf Pojer	Czechoslovakia	Prone	100	99	99	99	397	1138
14	Rudolf Pojer	Czechoslovakia	Standing	89	90	87	90	356	1138
14	Rudolf Pojer	Czechoslovakia	Kneeling	94	97	96	98	385	1138
15	Li Yun-hae	North Korea	Prone	99	98	99	95	391	1137
15	Li Yun-hae	North Korea	Standing	89	93	95	96	373	1137
15	Li Yun-hae	North Korea	Kneeling	94	91	95	93	373	1137
16	Andrzej Sieledcow	Poland	Prone	97	95	97	97	386	1135
16	Andrzej Sieledcow	Poland	Standing	90	92	92	95	369	1135
16	Andrzej Sieledcow	Poland	Kneeling	93	89	99	99	380	1135
17	Ri Ho-jun	North Korea	Prone	98	99	98	97	392	1133
17	Ri Ho-jun	North Korea	Standing	90	90	91	90	361	1133
17	Ri Ho-jun	North Korea	Kneeling	96	92	96	96	380	1133
18	Helge Anshushaug	Norway	Prone	96	98	98	95	387	1132
18	Helge Anshushaug	Norway	Standing	85	92	94	86	357	1132
18	Helge Anshushaug	Norway	Kneeling	99	95	97	97	388	1132
19	Eugeniusz Pędzisz	Poland	Prone	98	100	97	97	392	1131
19	Eugeniusz Pędzisz	Poland	Standing	92	87	94	90	363	1131
19	Eugeniusz Pędzisz	Poland	Kneeling	92	94	94	96	376	1131
20	Dirk Fudickar	West Germany	Prone	96	96	98	98	388	1131
20	Dirk Fudickar	West Germany	Standing	90	88	92	92	362	1131
20	Dirk Fudickar	West Germany	Kneeling	95	98	95	93	381	1131
21	Petre Șandor	Romania	Prone	95	97	96	97	385	1127
21	Petre Șandor	Romania	Standing	94	89	85	91	359	1127
21	Petre Șandor	Romania	Kneeling	93	98	97	95	383	1127
22	Andreas Beyeler	Switzerland	Prone	99	95	94	97	385	1126
22	Andreas Beyeler	Switzerland	Standing	85	93	90	91	359	1126
22	Andreas Beyeler	Switzerland	Kneeling	93	95	97	97	382	1126
23	Sven Johansson	Sweden	Prone	96	99	98	96	389	1126
23	Sven Johansson	Sweden	Standing	86	90	92	91	359	1126
23	Sven Johansson	Sweden	Kneeling	98	94	91	95	378	1126
24	Vagn Andersen	Denmark	Prone	99	98	98	98	393	1125
24	Vagn Andersen	Denmark	Standing	88	88	92	93	361	1125
24	Vagn Andersen	Denmark	Kneeling	93	91	93	94	371	1125
25	Osmo Ala-Honkola	Finland	Prone	97	99	97	98	391	1121
25	Osmo Ala-Honkola	Finland	Standing	85	88	94	90	357	1121
25	Osmo Ala-Honkola	Finland	Kneeling	94	97	91	91	373	1121
26	Per Weichel	Denmark	Prone	94	92	92	95	373	1114
26	Per Weichel	Denmark	Standing	90	92	90	94	366	1114
26	Per Weichel	Denmark	Kneeling	94	93	92	96	375	1114
27	Bjørn Bakken	Norway	Prone	97	93	95	94	379	1112
27	Bjørn Bakken	Norway	Standing	90	88	93	90	361	1112
27	Bjørn Bakken	Norway	Kneeling	91	93	98	90	372	1112
28	Eugen Satală	Romania	Prone	96	95	97	94	382	1102
28	Eugen Satală	Romania	Standing	91	89	85	86	351	1102
28	Eugen Satală	Romania	Kneeling	92	90	94	93	369	1102
29	Olegario Vázquez Raña	Mexico	Prone	95	98	96	93	382	1100
29	Olegario Vázquez Raña	Mexico	Standing	81	86	88	87	342	1100
29	Olegario Vázquez Raña	Mexico	Kneeling	93	94	96	93	376	1100
30	Wu Tao-yan	Republic of China	Prone	96	96	96	97	385	1085
30	Wu Tao-yan	Republic of China	Standing	81	87	85	82	335	1085
30	Wu Tao-yan	Republic of China	Kneeling	94	90	92	89	365	1085
31	Jesús Elizondo	Mexico	Prone	100	97	98	100	395	1078
31	Jesús Elizondo	Mexico	Standing	72	78	87	82	319	1078
31	Jesús Elizondo	Mexico	Kneeling	87	91	90	96	364	1078
32	Yondonjamtsyn Batsükh	Mongolia	Prone	97	91	96	90	374	1067
32	Yondonjamtsyn Batsükh	Mongolia	Standing	82	83	88	79	332	1067
32	Yondonjamtsyn Batsükh	Mongolia	Kneeling	93	91	87	90	361	1067
33	Reinaldo Ramírez	Paraguay	Prone	96	93	89	92	370	1030
33	Reinaldo Ramírez	Paraguay	Standing	75	88	85	74	322	1030
33	Reinaldo Ramírez	Paraguay	Kneeling	85	84	85	84	338	1030
—	Jorge di Giandoménico	Argentina	Prone						DNS
—	Jorge di Giandoménico	Argentina	Standing						DNS
—	Jorge di Giandoménico	Argentina	Kneeling						DNS
—	Alvaro Cleopatofsky	Colombia	Prone						DNS
—	Alvaro Cleopatofsky	Colombia	Standing						DNS
—	Alvaro Cleopatofsky	Colombia	Kneeling						DNS
—	Emilian Vergov	Bulgaria	Prone						DNS
—	Emilian Vergov	Bulgaria	Standing						DNS
—	Emilian Vergov	Bulgaria	Kneeling						DNS
