= Béla Nagy =

Béla Nagy may refer to:

- Béla Nagy (archer) (1943–2025), Hungarian archer
- Béla Nagy (sport shooter) (born 1941), Hungarian Olympic sport shooter
- Bela De Nagy (1893–1945), American Olympic fencer
- Béla Nagy (ice hockey) (born 1957), Romanian ice hockey player
- Béla Nagy (wrestler) (born 1962), Hungarian Olympic wrestler
- Béla Nagy (ichthyologist), Hungarian ichthyologist
