= Duțu =

Duțu is a surname. Notable people with the surname include:

- Eduard Duțu (born 2001), Romanian footballer
- Constantin Duțu (born 8 1949), Romanian fencer
- Matteo Duțu (born 2005), Romanian footballer
- Ștefan Duțu (born 2004), Romanian footballer
