= Carlo Lodi (disambiguation) =

Carlo Lodi (1701–1765) is an Italian painter of the late-Baroque period.

Carlo Lodi may also refer to:

- Carlo Alberto Lodi (born 1936), Italian former sports shooter
- Carlo Lodi (anarchist), believed pseudonym of Italian American anarchist Carlo Valdinoci (c. 1898 – 1919)
