= Prause =

Prause is a surname. Notable people with the surname include:

- Carl Prause (1893–1970), American football coach and college athletics administrator
- Fritz Prause (born 1949), Austrian fencer
- Kim Prause, American voice actress and theatre actress
- Nicole Prause, American neuroscientist
- Peter Prause (born 1943), German boxer
- Richard Prause (born 1968), German table tennis player
