= Mario Montano =

Mario Montano may refer to:

- Mario Aldo Montano (born 1948), Italian Olympic fencer
- Mario Tullio Montano (1944–2017), Italian Olympic fencer
