= Park Seong-tae =

Zainichi Korean sport shooter (born 1927)

Personal information
- Born: 10 July 1927

Korean name
- Hangul: 박성태
- Hanja: 朴性台
- RR: Bak Seongtae
- MR: Pak Sŏngt'ae

Sport
- Sport: Sports shooting

Park Seong-tae (born 10 July 1927) is a South Korean former sports shooter. He competed in the skeet event at the 1972 Summer Olympics.

Park was a Korean resident of Japan. He had previously tried out for the South Korean Olympic team in 1964 and 1968. During the South Korean qualifiers at Taereung for the 1969 World Shotgun Championships, he set a new national record in skeet shooting with a score of 197. He was later active in the Athletics Club of Mindan (an organisation for Koreans in Japan), and in 1993 was one of ten club members to receive a prize for his work from South Korea's Sport & Olympic Committee.
