= Jack Johnson (sport shooter) =

American sport shooter

Personal information
- Born: October 15, 1928 Bradford, Ohio, United States
- Died: August 1, 1993 (aged 64)

Sport
- Sport: Sports shooting

Jack Johnson (October 15, 1928 – August 1, 1993) was an American sports shooter. He competed in the skeet event at the 1972 Summer Olympics.
