= Colette Revenu =

French fencer

Personal information
- Born: 14 September 1944 (age 81) Châteauroux, France

Sport
- Sport: Fencing
Medal record
Representing France
Summer Universiade
Gold medal – first place	1963 Porto Alegre	Team foil
Bronze medal – third place	1965 Budapest	Team foil
Bronze medal – third place	1967 Tokyo	Individual foil

Colette Revenu (born 14 September 1944) is a French fencer. She competed in the women's team foil event at the 1964 Summer Olympics.
