= Shooting at the 1972 Summer Olympics – Mixed skeet =

Skeet at the Games of the XX Olympiad
- Venue: Schießanlage
- Date: August 31 & September 2, 1972
- Competitors: 63 from 36 nations
- Winning score: 195 +25

Medalists
1st place, gold medalist(s)		Konrad Wirnhier	West Germany
2nd place, silver medalist(s)		Yevgeni Petrov	Soviet Union
3rd place, bronze medalist(s)		Michael Buchheim	East Germany

The following are the results of the Skeet competition at the 1972 Summer Olympics. All three medalists had a tied score of 195. A shoot off was held, in the shoot off 1970 world champion, Konrad Wirnhier of West Germany hit all 25 birds to claim the gold. Earlier in the competition co-world record holder Yury Tsuranov of the Soviet Union disagreed with a ruling on a lost bird, and walked off the field. For his actions he was penalized three birds. This brought his score down to 192, exactly three birds short for the shoot off for the gold medal.

== Final ==
The format was: 200 targets. Four rounds of 25 targets for a total of 100 targets in each day. Ties for the medals were broken with a shoot off, all other ties are broken by the best score in round 8, if still tied after that it goes to round 7 and continues until the tie is broken.

Rank	Name	Nationality	1	2	3	4	Day 1	5	6	7	8	Total	Shoot off
1st place, gold medalist(s)	Konrad Wirnhier	West Germany	24	25	24	25	98	23	25	25	24	195	25
2nd place, silver medalist(s)	Yevgeni Petrov	Soviet Union	25	24	24	24	97	24	25	25	24	195	24
3rd place, bronze medalist(s)	Michael Buchheim	East Germany	25	25	23	24	97	25	25	23	25	195	23
4	Joe Neville	Great Britain	24	25	25	25	99	21	24	25	25	194	
5	Roberto Castrillo	Cuba	23	24	25	24	96	25	24	25	24	194	
6	Klaus Reschke	East Germany	24	24	23	25	95	25	24	23	25	193	
7	Élie Pénot	France	23	24	24	25	96	25	25	23	24	193	
8	Lakis Georgiou	Greece	23	25	22	23	93	25	25	24	25	192	
9	Jack Johnson	United States	23	23	24	24	94	25	25	23	25	192	
10	Romano Garagnani	Italy	23	23	25	24	94	23	25	25	24	192	
11	Miguel Marina	Spain	24	25	25	23	97	23	25	23	24	192	
12	Ari Westergård	Finland	24	25	25	23	97	24	24	23	24	192	
13	Yury Tsuranov	Soviet Union	25	24	21	25	95	25	25	24	23	192	
14	Francis Cornet	Belgium	22	24	25	25	96	24	25	24	23	192	
15	Lucian Cojocaru	Romania	25	21	25	23	94	24	23	25	25	191	
16	Colin Sephton	Great Britain	23	23	24	25	95	24	23	24	25	191	
17	Jorge Uauy	Chile	24	24	22	23	93	24	25	25	24	191	
18	Carlo Alberto Lodi	Italy	23	23	23	24	93	25	24	25	24	191	
19	Niels-Ove Mikkelsen	Denmark	23	24	25	22	94	24	25	25	23	191	
20	Artur Rogowski	Poland	22	23	24	25	94	21	25	25	25	190	
21	Panagiotis Xanthakos	Greece	25	21	24	23	93	25	24	24	24	190	
22	Walter Wrigge	West Germany	23	22	25	25	95	23	25	23	24	190	
23	Gleb Pintilie	Romania	24	24	23	23	94	23	25	25	23	190	
24	Servilio Torres	Cuba	24	23	24	24	95	24	24	24	23	190	
25	Bruno De Costa	Canada	24	24	25	25	98	23	21	23	23	188	
26	Firmo Roberti	Argentina	22	23	24	25	94	24	25	23	22	188	
27	Gerardo González	Colombia	24	20	24	22	90	25	23	24	25	187	
28	Özman Gıraud	Turkey	23	24	23	24	94	21	24	23	25	187	
29	Lars-Erik Söderberg	Sweden	23	25	20	22	90	24	24	25	24	187	
30	Güneş Yunus	Turkey	23	22	23	22	90	24	25	24	24	187	
31	Ben Pon	Netherlands	23	25	22	24	94	23	24	22	24	187	
32	Antonio Yaqigi	Chile	22	22	24	24	92	25	24	24	22	187	
33	Anton Manolov	Bulgaria	24	23	24	23	94	24	24	23	22	187	
34	Tony Rosetti	United States	23	21	23	23	90	24	24	24	24	186	
35	Eric Swinkels	Netherlands	22	23	25	23	93	25	21	23	24	186	
36	Karni Singh	India	21	24	22	24	91	24	25	23	23	186	
37	Roger Mangin	France	24	23	22	22	91	24	21	24	25	185	
38	Nuria Ortíz	Mexico	22	23	24	23	92	22	23	25	23	185	
39	Wiesław Gawlikowski	Poland	23	23	22	22	90	23	25	24	23	185	
40	Antoine Saade	Lebanon	21	25	20	25	91	24	25	22	23	185	
41	Juan Bueno	Mexico	24	23	23	20	90	24	23	23	24	184	
42	Gert-Åke Bengtsson	Sweden	23	23	20	23	89	24	24	21	25	183	
43	Manuel González	Colombia	21	22	22	23	88	24	24	22	24	182	
44	Park Do-keun	South Korea	21	24	23	22	90	24	23	22	23	182	
45	Juan Ávalos	Spain	23	20	23	24	90	22	24	24	22	182	
46	Ole Justesen	Denmark	23	21	22	22	88	24	21	22	25	180	
47	Andrés Amador	El Salvador	21	22	23	22	88	23	22	24	23	180	
48	Chris Binet	Belgium	23	21	23	25	92	20	23	25	20	180	
49	José de Matos	Portugal	21	22	24	21	88	23	24	21	23	179	
50	Donald Sanderlin	Canada	19	23	23	23	88	22	25	22	21	178	
51	Rafael Batista	Puerto Rico	25	23	21	20	89	21	23	19	24	176	
52	William Campbell	Ireland	22	21	19	22	84	23	23	21	24	175	
53	Arthur McMahon	Ireland	20	20	23	21	84	22	24	22	22	174	
54	Maurice Tabet	Lebanon	21	21	21	21	84	21	22	19	25	171	
55	Joseph Grech	Malta	21	23	23	20	87	24	20	19	20	170	
56	Park Seong-tae	South Korea	18	23	18	20	79	22	22	23	22	168	
57	Melchor Yap	Philippines	20	22	20	22	84	19	21	22	21	167	
58	Riad Yunes	Dominican Republic	18	22	22	19	81	22	19	20	24	166	
59	Carlos Asbun	Bolivia	16	22	22	20	80	21	19	23	19	162	
60	Armando Salvietti	Bolivia	18	22	20	21	81	20	22	17	21	161	
61	Raymundo Quitoriano	Philippines	17	16	16	19	68	17	21	19	21	143	
62	Domingo Lorenzo	Dominican Republic	19	14	20	17	70	17	17	18	20	142	
—	Philip Serjeant	Swaziland										DNF	
—	Ratcho Kossev	Bulgaria										DNS	
—	Heikki Lindfors	Finland										DNS	
—	Robert Carr-Hartley	Kenya										DNS	
