= Boris Melnik =

Soviet sports shooter (1945–2016)

Personal information
- Born: 2 February 1945 Vinnytsia, Soviet Union
- Died: 24 November 2016 (aged 71)

Sport
- Sport: Sports shooting
Medal record
Men's shooting
Representing Soviet Union
Olympic Games
Silver medal – second place	1972 Munich	300 m rifle, three positions

Boris Melnik (2 February 1945 – 24 November 2016) was a Soviet sports shooter. He competed at the 1972 Summer Olympics and the 1976 Summer Olympics. He won a silver medal in 1972, in the 300 m rifle, three positions event.
