= Lajos Papp =

Hungarian sport shooter (1944–1993)

Personal information
- Born: 8 April 1944 Debrecen, Hungary
- Died: 31 October 1993 (aged 49) Budapest, Hungary

Sport
- Sport: Sports shooting
Medal record
Men's shooting
Representing Hungary
Olympic Games
Bronze medal – third place	1972 Munich	300 m free rifle

Lajos Papp (8 April 1944 – 31 October 1993) was a Hungarian sport shooter who won a bronze medal in the 300 m free rifle event at the 1972 Summer Olympics in Munich.
