= Péter Marót =

Hungarian fencer (1945–2020)

Personal information
- Born: 27 May 1945 Miskolc, Hungary
- Died: 7 June 2020 (aged 75)

Sport
- Sport: Fencing
Medal record
Men's fencing
Representing Hungary
Olympic Games
Silver medal – second place	1972 Munich	Sabre, individual
Bronze medal – third place	1972 Munich	Sabre, team

Péter Marót (27 May 1945 – 7 June 2020) was a Hungarian fencer. He won a silver medal in the individual sabre and a bronze in the team event at the 1972 Summer Olympics. He also competed at the 1976 Summer Olympics.

Marót died on 7 June 2020 in a traffic collision.
