= Fencing at the 1967 Summer Universiade =

Fencing events were contested at the 1967 Summer Universiade in Tokyo, Japan.

== Medal overview ==
=== Men's events ===
Event	Gold	Silver	Bronze
Individual foil	Arcangelo Pinelli (ITA)	Daniel Revenu (FRA)	Nicola Granieri (ITA)
Team foil	Japan (JPN)	Italy (ITA)	France (FRA)
Individual épée	Denys Chamay (SUI)	Nicola Granieri (ITA)	Roland Losert (AUT)
Team épée	Switzerland (SUI)	Sweden (SWE)	Japan (JPN)
Individual sabre	Bernard Vallée (FRA)	Cesare Salvadori (ITA)	Mario Tullio Montano (ITA)
Team sabre	Italy (ITA)	Japan (JPN)	France (FRA)

=== Women's events ===
Event	Gold	Silver	Bronze
Individual foil	Kerstin Palm (SWE)	Annick Level (FRA)	Colette Revenu (FRA)

== Medal table ==
Rank	Nation	Gold	Silver	Bronze	Total
1	Italy (ITA)	2	3	2	7
2	Switzerland (SUI)	2	0	0	2
3	France (FRA)	1	2	3	6
4	Japan (JPN)	1	1	1	3
5	Sweden (SWE)	1	1	0	2
6	Austria (AUT)	0	0	1	1
Totals (6 entries)		7	7	7	21
