= Hanspeter Würmli =

Swiss swimmer

Personal information
- Born: 8 January 1953 (age 73) St. Gallen, Switzerland

Sport
- Sport: Swimming

Hanspeter Würmli (now Hans Peter Würmli, born 8 January 1953 in St. Gallen) is a former Swiss freestyle swimmer. He competed in two events at the 1972 Summer Olympics.

In 1973, he concluded his swimming career and began pursuing a degree in Mathematics, later earning a PhD from ETH Zurich. His professional career was primarily spent with Swiss Re, a Swiss reinsurance company.
