= Dieter Freise =

German field hockey player (1945–2018)

Olympic medal record

Men's field hockey

Representing West Germany

Olympic Games
| Gold medal – first place | 1972 Munich | Team competition |

Dieter Freise (18 February 1945 – 5 April 2018) was a field hockey player from Germany, who was a member of the West German squad that won the gold medal at the 1972 Summer Olympics in Munich. He also competed in the 1976 Summer Olympics, where the West German team finished fifth. He was born in Heidelberg.
