= Béla Nagy (sport shooter) =

Hungarian sport shooter

Personal information
- Born: 9 May 1941 (age 85) Budapest, Hungary

Sport
- Sport: Sports shooting

Béla Nagy (born 9 May 1941) is a Hungarian former sports shooter. He competed in the 300 m rifle, three positions event at the 1972 Summer Olympics.
