= Siegfried Ortmann =

German archer (1937–2023)

Personal information
- Nationality: German
- Born: 17 January 1937; Ruhla, Thuringia, Germany
- Died: 17 January 2023 (aged 86); Munich, Germany

Sport
- Sport: Archery

Siegfried Ortmann (17 January 1937 – 17 January 2023) was a German archer. He competed in the men's individual event at the 1972 Summer Olympics.
