= Lucien Trepper =

Swiss archer (born 1953)

Personal information
- Nationality: Swiss
- Born: 19 May 1953 (age 71)

Sport
- Sport: Archery

Lucien Trepper (born 19 May 1953) is a Swiss archer. He competed in the men's individual event at the 1972 Summer Olympics.
