= Wolfgang Rott =

German field hockey player

Olympic medal record

Men's Field Hockey

Representing West Germany
Gold medal – first place	1972 Munich	Team competition

Wolfgang Rott (born 28 November 1946) is a former field hockey player from West Germany, who was a member of the West-German team that won the golden medal at the 1972 Summer Olympics in Munich. He also competed at the 1968 and 1976 Olympic Games, where West Germany finished fourth and fifth. He played at club level for THC Mettmann.
