= Viorel Bălaș =

Romanian volleyball player (born 1951)

Personal information
- Nationality: Romanian
- Born: 7 March 1951 (age 74)

Sport
- Sport: Volleyball

Viorel Bălaș (born 7 March 1951) is a Romanian volleyball player. He competed in the men's tournament at the 1972 Summer Olympics. Bălaș and his teammates finished the tournament in fifth place. He was affiliated with the club U Cluj in Cluj-Napoca, a Romanian sports club.
