= Romeo Enescu =

Romanian volleyball player (born 1951)

Personal information
- Nationality: Romanian
- Born: 14 April 1951 (age 73); Bucharest, Romania

Sport
- Sport: Volleyball

Romeo Enescu (born 14 April 1951) is a Romanian volleyball player. He competed in the men's tournament at the 1972 Summer Olympics.
