= Gerhard Schiller =

West German swimmer

Personal information
- Born: April 17, 1949 (age 77) Stuttgart, West Germany

Sport
- Sport: Swimming
Medal record
Representing West Germany
European Championships
Gold medal – first place	1974 Vienna	4x100m freestyle relay
Silver medal – second place	1970 Barcelona	4x100m freestyle relay

Gerhard Schiller (born 17 April 1949) is a West German former swimmer who competed in the 1972 Summer Olympics.
