= Eckart Suhl =

German field hockey player

Personal information
- Born: 20 April 1943 (age 83) Hamburg, Germany
Medal record
Men's Field Hockey
Representing West Germany
Olympic Games
Gold medal – first place	1972 Munich	Team competition

Eckart Suhl (sometimes spelled Eckardt Suhl; born 20 April 1943 in Hamburg) is a former field hockey player from Germany, who was a member of the West-German team that won the golden medal at the 1972 Summer Olympics in Munich.
