= Janusz Majewski (fencer) =

Polish fencer

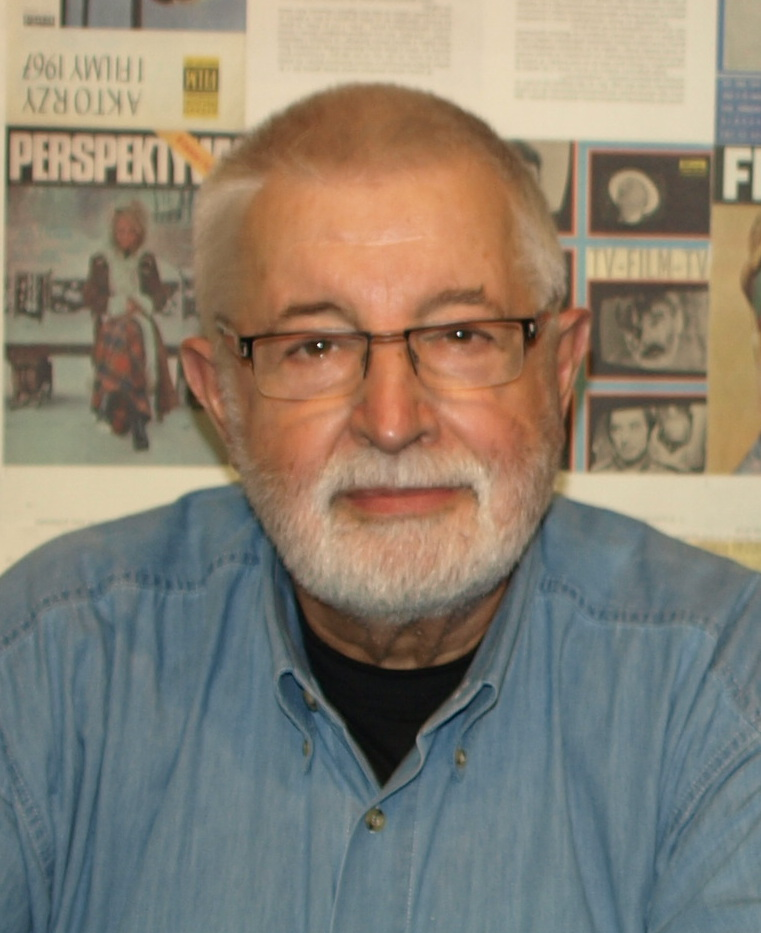

Personal information
- Born: 29 January 1940 Dzierzgowo, Poland
- Died: 11 September 2025 (aged 85) Warsaw, Poland

Sport
- Sport: Fencing

Janusz Majewski (29 January 1940 – 11 September 2025) was a Polish fencer. He competed in the individual and team sabre events at the 1972 Summer Olympics.

== Biography ==
Majewski was born on 29 January 1940 in Dzierzgowo, Poland. He completed his secondary education in 1957 at a general secondary school in Olsztyn. In 1980, he graduated from the Faculty of Hydraulic Engineering at the Warsaw University of Technology. He represented the fencing club Warszawianka.

He achieved early international success at the 1960 World Junior Championships in Leningrad, where he won the bronze medal in the individual sabre event.

At the senior level, Majewski won medals at the World Fencing Championships. At the 1969 World Championships in Havana, he was part of the Polish team alongside Jerzy Pawłowski, Józef Nowara, Zygmunt Kawecki, and Krzysztof Grzegorek, and won the silver medal in the team sabre event. He later won the bronze medal in the same event at the 1970 World Championships in Ankara.

He also competed at the 1972 Summer Olympics in Munich, where he reached the quarter-finals in the individual sabre and placed fifth in the team event.

Majewski died on 11 September 2025 in Warsaw, at the age of 85.
