= Peter Kraus (field hockey) =

German field hockey player (1941–2024)

Olympic medal record

Men's Field Hockey

Representing West Germany
Gold medal – first place	1972 Munich	Team competition

Peter Kraus (27 June 1941 – 1 August 2024) was a German field hockey player, who was a member of the West German squad that won the gold medal at the 1972 Summer Olympics in Munich. Kraus died on 1 August 2024, at the age of 83.
