= Ioannis Hatzisarantos =

Greek fencer

Personal information
- Born: 21 January 1948 (age 78)

Sport
- Sport: Fencing

Ioannis Hatzisarantos (Greek: Ιωάννης Χατζησαράντος; born 21 January 1948) is a Greek fencer. He competed in the individual sabre event at the 1972 Summer Olympics.
