= Gyula Bartha =

Romanian volleyball player (born 1945)

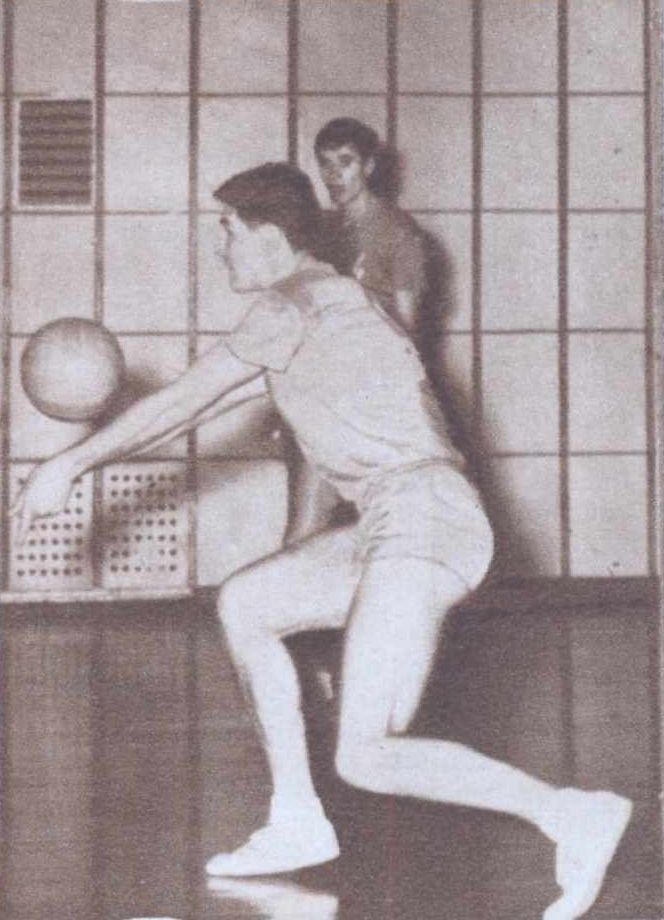
- Ghiula Barta in 1965

Personal information
- Nationality: Romanian
- Born: 8 July 1945 (age 81) Odorheiu Secuiesc, Romania

Sport
- Sport: Volleyball

Gyula Bartha (born 8 July 1945) is a Romanian volleyball player. He competed in the men's tournament at the 1972 Summer Olympics.
