= Dirk Fudickar =

German sports shooter

Personal information
- Born: 2 August 1946 (age 79) Wuppertal, Germany

Sport
- Sport: Sports shooting

Dirk Fudickar (born 2 August 1946) is a German former sports shooter. He competed in the 300 m rifle, three positions event at the 1972 Summer Olympics for West Germany.
