= Fritz Schmidt (field hockey) =

German field hockey player (1943–2024)

Olympic medal record

Men's field hockey

Representing West Germany
Gold medal – first place	1972 Munich	Team competition

Fritz Schmidt (19 March 1943 – 12 August 2024) was a German field hockey player who competed in the 1968 Summer Olympics, in the 1972 Summer Olympics, and in the 1976 Summer Olympics. Schmidt died on 12 August 2024, at the age of 81.
