= Ion Ganea =

Romanian diver

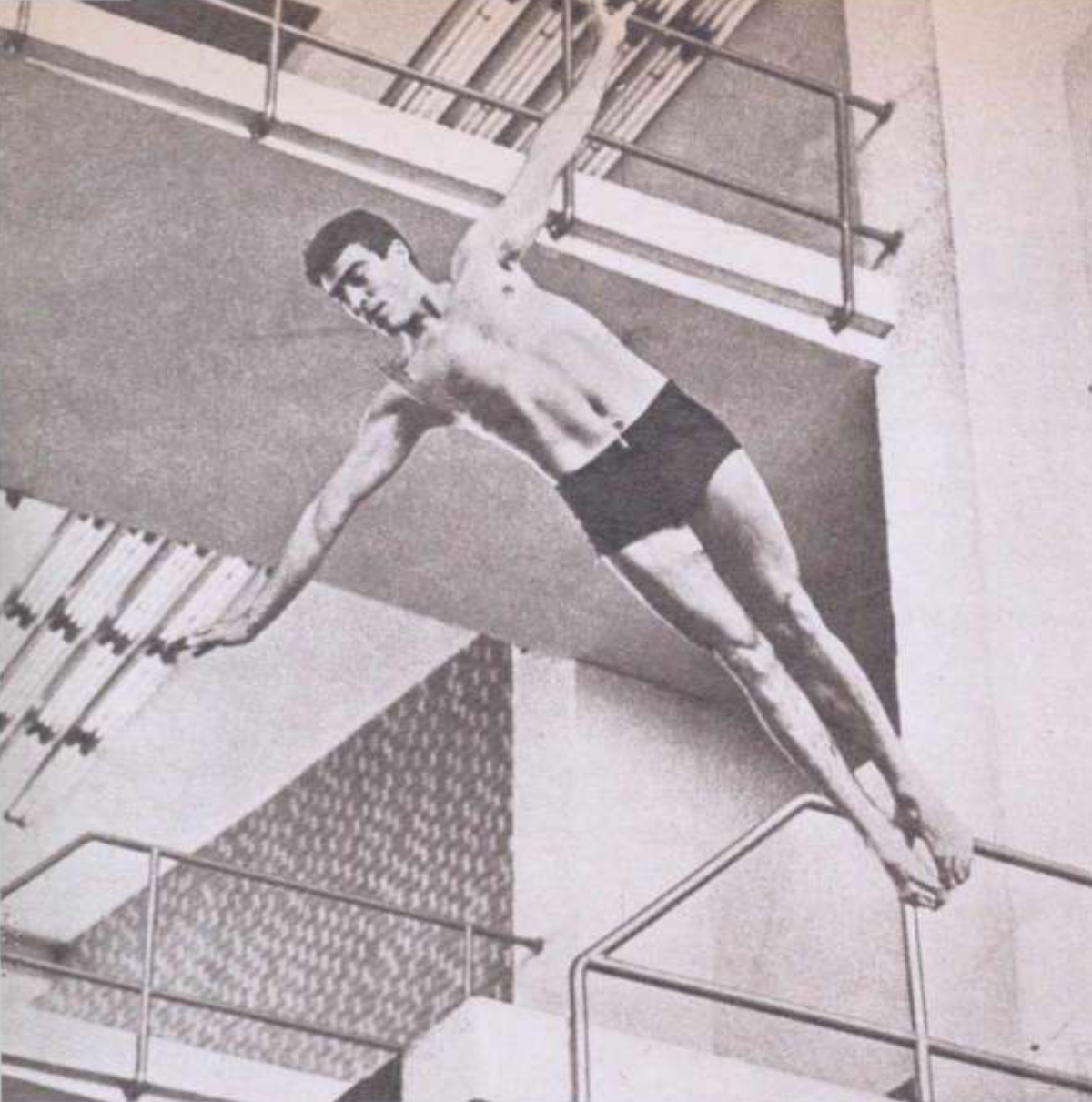

Personal information
- Nationality: Romanian
- Born: 10 February 1945 (age 81) Sibiu, Romania

Sport
- Sport: Diving

Ion Ganea (born 10 February 1945) is a Romanian former diver. He competed in two events at the 1972 Summer Olympics.
