= Eduard Thelen =

Field hockey player

Olympic medal record

Men's Field Hockey

Representing West Germany
Gold medal – first place	1972 Munich	Team competition

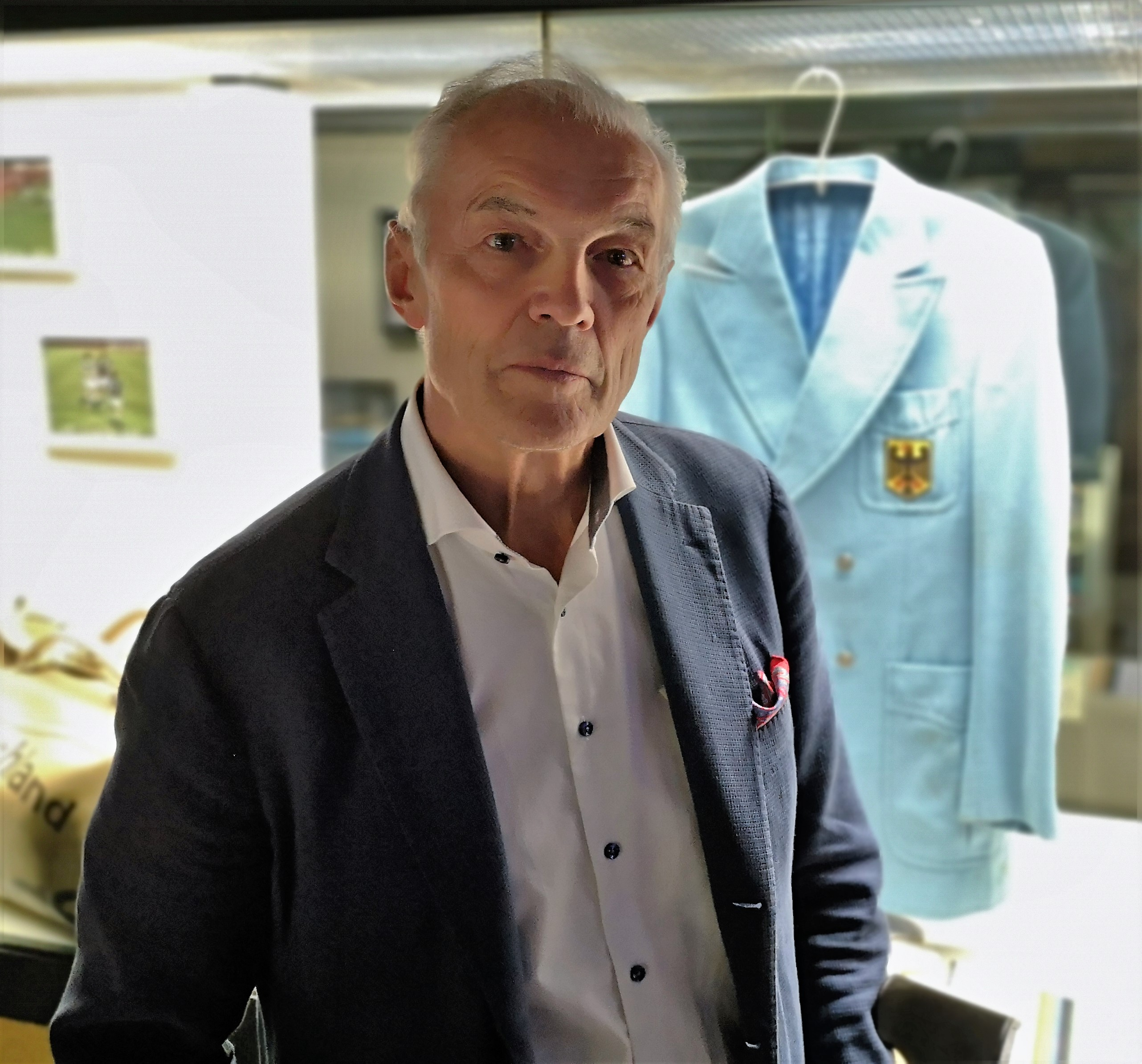
Eduard Thelen (2022)

Eduard Thelen (born 7 September 1946) is a former field hockey player from Germany, who was a member of the West-German team that defeated Pakistan in the final of the 1972 Summer Olympics in Munich. During his active career he played for Rot-Weiss Koeln winning the German national title three times.
