= Gleb Pintilie =

Romanian sports shooter (born 1930)

Personal information
- Born: 4 December 1930 Briceni, Kingdom of Romania (now in Moldova)

Sport
- Sport: Sports shooting

Gleb Pintilie (born 4 December 1930) is a Romanian former sports shooter. He competed in the skeet event at the 1972 Summer Olympics.
