= Marian Slavic =

Romanian swimmer

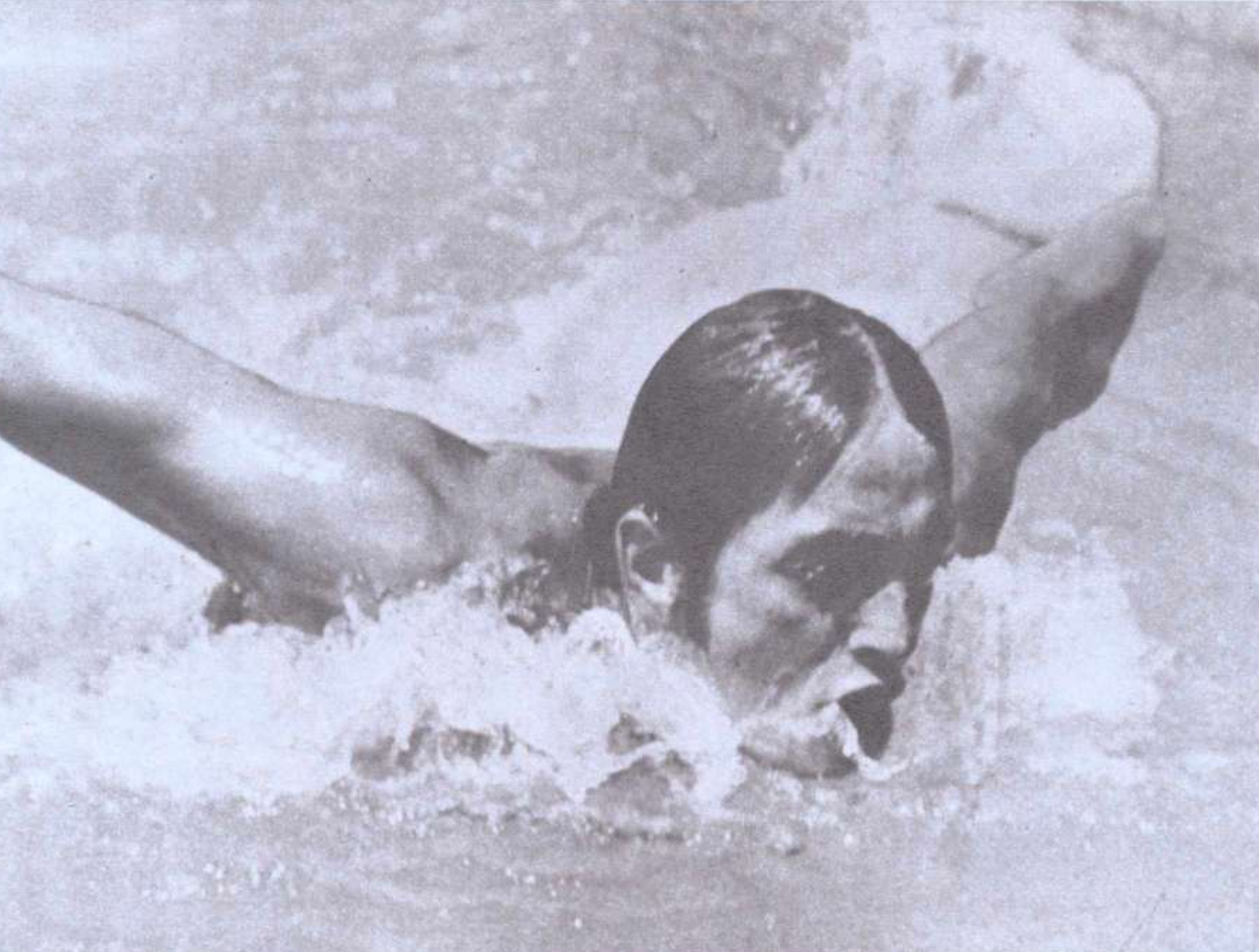
- Slavic in 1970

Personal information
- Born: 6 February 1946 (age 80) Ploiesti, Kingdom of Romania

Sport
- Sport: Swimming

Marian Slavic (born 6 February 1946) is a Romanian former freestyle and medley swimmer. He competed in three events at the 1972 Summer Olympics.
