= Hermilo Leal =

Mexican fencer

Hermilo Leal Lara
Personal information
- Born: 21 December 1951 (age 74)

Sport
- Sport: Fencing

Hermilo Leal Lara (born 21 December 1951) is a Mexican fencer. He competed in the team épée and individual sabre events at the 1972 Summer Olympics.
