= Carlo Alberto Lodi =

Italian sports shooter

Personal information
- Born: 28 October 1936 Modena, Italy
- Died: 14 January 2001 (aged 64)

Sport
- Sport: Sports shooting

Carlo Alberto Lodi (28 October 1936 – 14 January 2001) was an Italian sports shooter. He competed in the skeet event at the 1972 Summer Olympics.
