= Lucian Cojocaru =

Romanian sports shooter

Personal information
- Born: 21 December 1952 (age 73)
- Height: 181 cm (5 ft 11 in)
- Weight: 65 kg (143 lb)

Sport
- Sport: Sports shooting

Lucian Cojocaru (born 21 December 1952) is a Romanian former sports shooter. He competed in the skeet event at the 1972 Summer Olympics.
