= Cristian Ion =

Romanian volleyball player (born 1950)

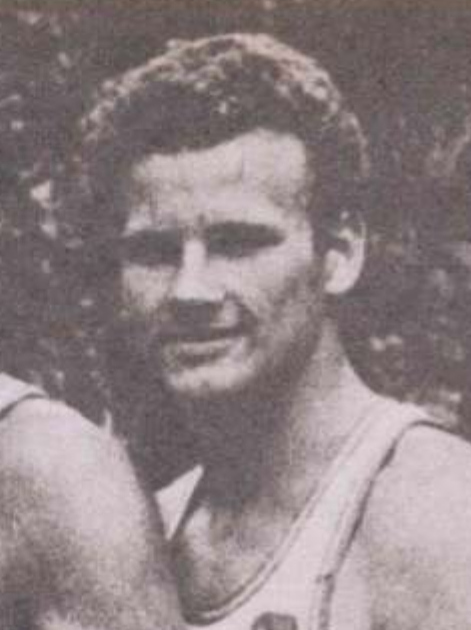

Personal information
- Nationality: Romanian
- Born: 9 April 1950 (age 75)

Sport
- Sport: Volleyball

Cristian Ion (born 9 April 1950) is a Romanian volleyball player. He competed in the men's tournament at the 1972 Summer Olympics.
