= Marian Stamate =

Romanian volleyball player (born 1946)

Personal information
- Nationality: Romanian
- Born: 6 April 1946 (age 78); Bucharest, Romania

Sport
- Sport: Volleyball

Marian Stamate (born 6 April 1946) is a Romanian volleyball player. He competed in the men's tournament at the 1972 Summer Olympics.
