= Eduard Ham =

Dutch fencer (born 1950)

Personal information
- Born: 14 May 1950 (age 76) Delft, Netherlands

Sport
- Sport: Fencing

Eduard Ham (born 14 May 1950) is a Dutch fencer. He competed in the individual sabre event at the 1972 Summer Olympics.
