= Roberto Alva =

Mexican fencer

Personal information
- Born: 10 September 1951 (age 74)

Sport
- Sport: Fencing

Roberto Alva (born 10 September 1951) is a Mexican fencer. He competed in the individual sabre event at the 1972 Summer Olympics, held in Germany.
