= Tamás Kovács (fencer) =

Hungarian fencer (born 1943)

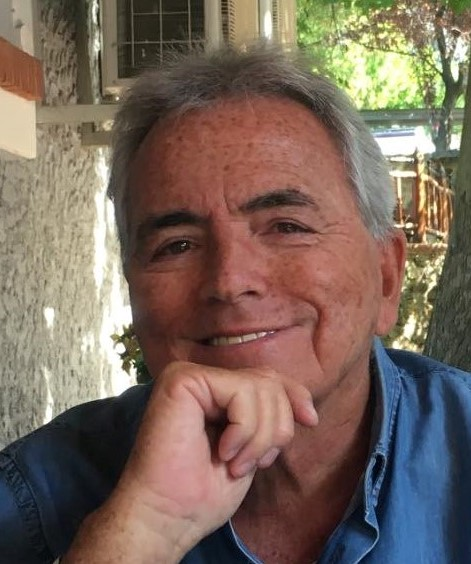

Personal information
- Born: 20 March 1943 (age 83) Budapest, Hungary

Sport
- Sport: Fencing
Medal record
Men's fencing
Representing Hungary
Olympic Games
Bronze medal – third place	1968 Mexico City	Sabre, team
Bronze medal – third place	1972 Munich	Sabre, team

Tamás Kovács (born 20 March 1943) is a Hungarian fencer. He won bronze medals in the team sabre events at the 1968 and 1972 Summer Olympics.
