= Eugen Satală =

Romanian sports shooter

Personal information
- Born: 8 May 1950 (age 76) Focșani, Romania

Sport
- Sport: Sports shooting

Eugen Satală (born 8 May 1950) is a Romanian former sports shooter. He competed in the 300 m rifle, three positions event at the 1972 Summer Olympics.
