= Gabriel Udişteanu =

Romanian volleyball player (1945–1992)

Personal information
- Nationality: Romanian
- Born: 20 February 1945; Arad, Romania
- Died: 1992 (aged 46–47)

Sport
- Sport: Volleyball

Gabriel Udişteanu (20 February 1945 – 1992) was a Romanian volleyball player. He competed in the men's tournament at the 1972 Summer Olympics.
