= Toni Reber =

Swiss fencer

Personal information
- Born: 16 August 1945 (age 80)

Sport
- Sport: Fencing

Toni Reber (born 16 August 1945) is a Swiss fencer. He competed in the team sabre event at the 1972 Summer Olympics.
