= Stoyko Lipchev =

Bulgarian fencer

Personal information
- Born: 12 November 1945 (age 80)

Sport
- Sport: Fencing

Stoyko Lipchev (Bulgarian: Стойко Липчев; born 12 November 1945) is a Bulgarian fencer. He competed in the individual and team sabre events at the 1972 Summer Olympics.
