= Alain Barudoni =

Swiss fencer

Personal information
- Born: 19 April 1940 (age 86)

Sport
- Sport: Fencing

Alain Barudoni (born 19 April 1940) is a Swiss fencer. He competed in the team sabre event at the 1972 Summer Olympics.
