= Alex Orban =

American fencer (1939–2021)

Personal information
- Born: August 25, 1939 Budapest, Hungary
- Died: December 2, 2021 (aged 82)

Sport
- Sport: Fencing

Alex Orban (August 25, 1939 – December 2, 2021) was a Hungarian-American sabre fencer. He competed at the 1968, 1972 and 1976 Summer Olympics. Orban also qualified for the 1980 Olympic team but did not compete due to the U.S. Olympic Committee's boycott of the 1980 Summer Olympics in Moscow, Russia, USSR. He was one of 461 athletes to receive a Congressional Gold Medal many years later.

== See also ==
- List of USFA Division I National Champions
- List of USFA Hall of Fame members
