= Guzman Salazar =

Cuban fencer (born 1951)

Personal information
- Born: 29 November 1951 (age 74)

Sport
- Sport: Fencing

Guzman Salazar (born 29 November 1951) is a Cuban fencer. He competed at the 1972, 1976 and 1980 Summer Olympics.
