= Krzysztof Grzegorek (fencer) =

Polish fencer

Personal information
- Born: 19 September 1946 (age 79) Łuczywno, Poland

Sport
- Sport: Fencing

Krzysztof Grzegorek (born 19 September 1946) is a Polish former fencer. He competed in the team sabre event at the 1972 Summer Olympics.
