= Boris Stavrev =

Bulgarian fencer (1935–2003)

- Boris Stavrev in Sofia (September 1954)

Personal information
- Born: 7 March 1935 Sofia, Bulgaria
- Died: 16 May 2003 (aged 68)

Sport
- Sport: Fencing

Boris Stavrev (Bulgarian: Борис Ставрев, 7 March 1935 – 16 May 2003) was a Bulgarian foil and sabre fencer. He competed at the 1960 and 1972 Summer Olympics.
