= Zygmunt Kawecki =

Polish fencer

Personal information
- Born: 6 November 1942 (age 83) Warsaw, Poland

Sport
- Sport: Fencing

Zygmunt Kawecki (born 6 November 1942) is a Polish fencer. He competed in the team sabre events at the 1968 and 1972 Summer Olympics.
