= Constantin Duțu =

Romanian fencer

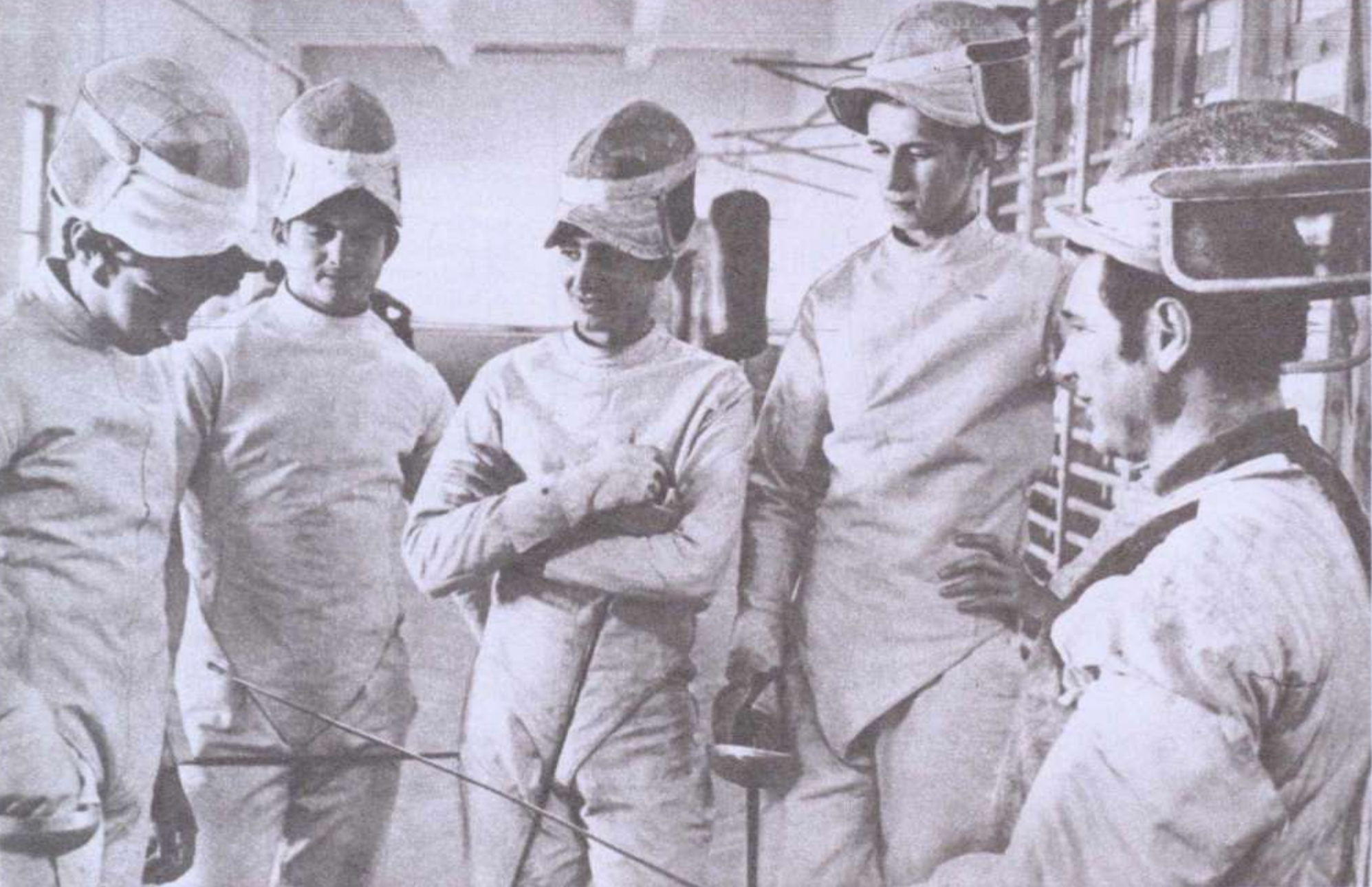
- Constantin Duțu, Marius Bunea, Adrian Cărămidă, Liviu Isailă, antrenorul Paul Ghinju

Personal information
- Born: 8 October 1949 (age 76) Craiova, Romania

Sport
- Sport: Fencing

Constantin Duțu (born 8 October 1949) is a Romanian fencer. He competed in the team épée event at the 1972 Summer Olympics.
