= Gheorghe Culcea =

Romanian fencer

Personal information
- Born: 16 April 1939 (age 87)

Sport
- Sport: Fencing

Gheorghe Culcea (born 16 April 1939) is a Romanian fencer. He competed in the team sabre event at the 1972 Summer Olympics.
