= John Deanfield =

British fencer

Personal information
- Full name: John Eric Deanfield
- Born: 28 April 1952 (age 74) Marylebone, London, England

Sport
- Sport: Fencing

John Eric Deanfield CBE (born 28 April 1952) is a British professor of cardiology and past Olympic fencer.

Deanfield FRCP FESC is a British professor of cardiology at University College London. He is Director of the National Institute of Cardiovascular Outcomes Research (NICOR) in the UK and a senior advisor to Public Health England (PHE) on Cardiovascular disease Prevention. In his role within NICOR, Deanfield has played a leading role in the use of national data to improve outcomes from heart disease. He has championed the idea of lifetime benefits of sustained management of cardiovascular risk factors and comorbidities, introducing the concept of 'investing in your arteries'.

== Early life ==
Born in London to Polish immigrant parents, Deanfield went to Westminster School, London. At the age of 15, he was accepted to Churchill College, Cambridge to study Medical Sciences and graduated in 1972. Deanfield is married to Melanie (Fulford) who he met at Great Ormond Street Hospital (GOSH), London, during his training. They have two children.

== Fencing ==
A keen fencer, he captained the Cambridge University fencing team and represented Britain at the Munich and Montreal Olympic games, before boycotting the Moscow games. He competed in the individual and team sabre events at the 1972 and 1976 Summer Olympics. In 1969 he won the Junior saber and under-21 national sabre titles, and in 1970 reached the final of the world junior saber championships. In 1975, he won the sabre title at the British Fencing Championships, but the following year his career was marred by a bad knee injury. He was selected for the 1980 Olympic Games in Moscow, but along with three other members of the five-strong saber team, elected to boycott the event.

== Medical and academic career ==
Deanfield's career has focused on the management of heart disease across the lifetime of an individual. He completed his clinical training at the Middlesex Hospital London. He then carried out his postgraduate training at Great Ormond Street Hospital in paediatric cardiology and at the Royal Postgraduate Medical School Hammersmith Hospital, London, in adult cardiology, which allowed him to understand cardiovascular disease in it different stages and progression.

Deanfield was appointed a Consultant Cardiologist at GOSH in 1984. A key contributor to the new speciality of Adult Congenital Heart Disease, he chaired the National and International Practice Guidelines, including the European Society of Cardiology Task Force for Grown Up Congenital Heart Disease (GUCH) (2003). At The National Heart Hospital, he developed one of the largest programmes for Adult Congenital Heart Disease (ACHD/GUCH) in the world, which was transferred to create a new unit at the new Barts Heart Centre in 2015. He chaired the Standards Committee for Adults in the UK National ‘Safe and Sustainable’ Review of Congenital Heart Disease services in 2014 and advised on subsequent implementation.

As Director of NICOR since 2011, Deanfield oversees one of the largest longitudinal set of cardiovascular electronic health records in the world, providing UK-wide data for NHS Quality Improvement, research and public engagement. He has actively worked towards improvements to cardiology, working on prevention, clinical care and the evaluation of outcomes.

He has published more than 450 research articles, ranging across the consequences of congenital heart disease to the early onset of acquired cardiovascular disease in adults. Deanfield developed a non-invasive technique to study the factors responsible for early arterial disease and its response to treatment. In 2014, he chaired the JBS3 Cardiovascular Prevention Guidelines, introducing the concept of ‘investing in your arteries’ to communicate with patients. This in turn led to the development in 2018 of the Heart Age Calculator to extend this messaging to the general public, in collaboration with PHE and NHS England. Deanfield co-chairs the Expert Scientific and Clinical Advisory Panel (ESCAP) for the Health Check Programme in PHE as well as the Academic Group on Healthy Ageing in PHE.

== Honours, awards and international recognition ==
Deanfield was awarded a British Heart Foundation Chair to study cardiovascular disease prevention (2003–2018). He became adjunct Professor at Yale University, New Haven USA in 2009 and was given an Einstein Professorship (2018–2021) at the Hospital Charite Universitätsmedizin Berlin to study Artificial Intelligence in large scale cardiovascular data. Deanfield was elected a Fellow of the Academy of Medical Sciences (FMedSci) in 2001, and in 2017 he was awarded the British Cardiovascular Society Mackenzie medal in recognition of outstanding service to British Cardiology.

He was appointed Commander of the Order of the British Empire (CBE) in the 2021 Birthday Honours for services to the prevention and treatment of heart disease.

== Consulting and charity ==
Deanfield sits on the Medical Advisory Committees and Boards of a number of healthcare companies. He is Chief Medical Advisor to the new national early disease detection programme, Our Future Health (2020) and Chaired the National Health Check Programme Review (2021). His charity positions include membership of the Medical Advisory Board of the Chain of Hope Charity and Academic Committee Chair of Heart(UK). For many years, Deanfield was medical advisor to the Somerville Foundation for Adult Congenital Heart Disease patients.
