= Petre Șandor =

Romanian sports shooter (1937–2009)

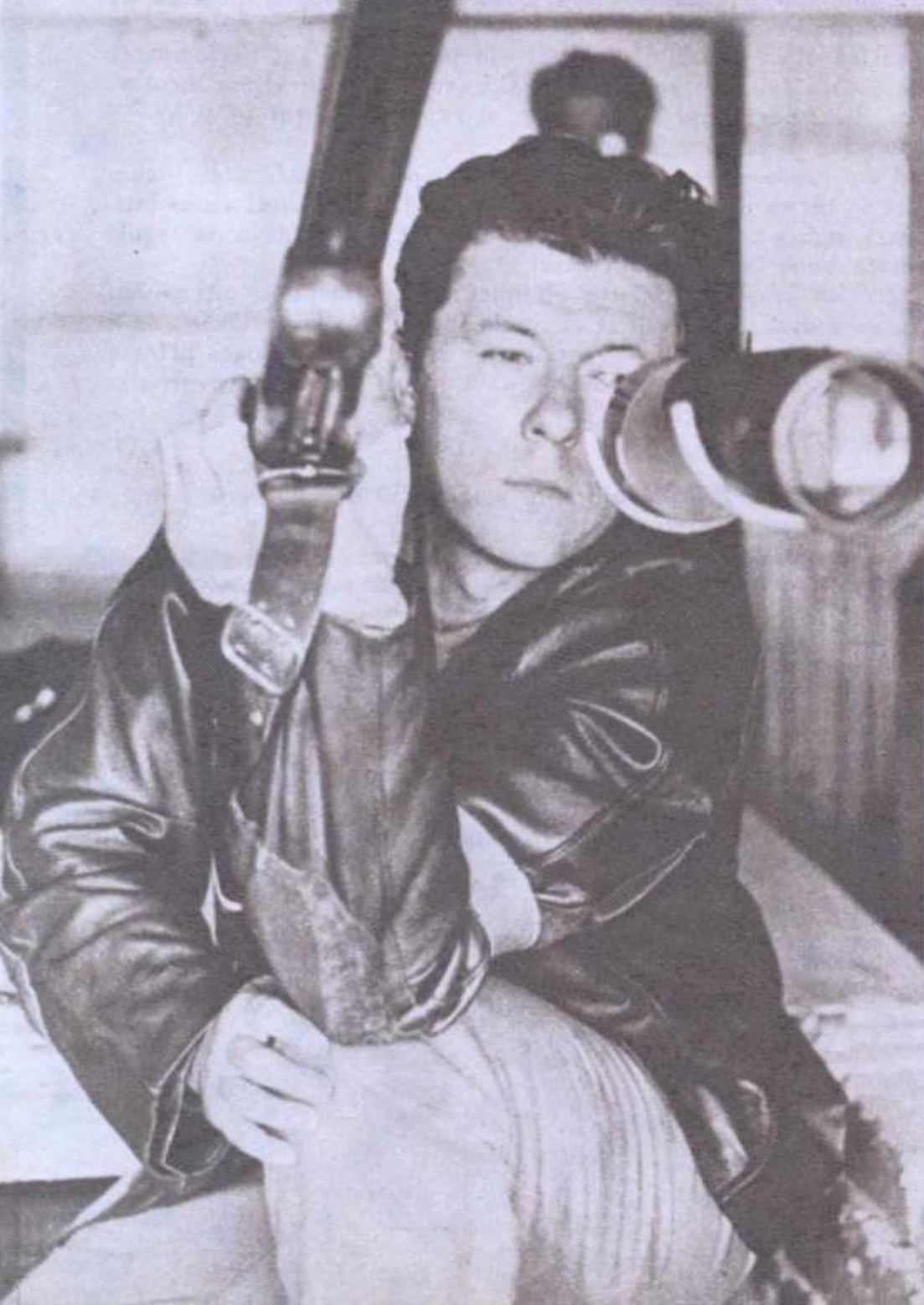
- Șandor in 1972

Personal information
- Born: 1 February 1937 Oradea, Romania
- Died: 2009 (aged 71–72)

Sport
- Sport: Sports shooting

Petre Șandor (1 February 1937 – 2009) was a Romanian sports shooter. He competed at the 1968 Summer Olympics and the 1972 Summer Olympics.
