= Hanns Brandstätter =

Austrian fencer

Personal information
- Born: 4 June 1949 (age 77) Villach, Austria

Sport
- Sport: Fencing

Hanns Brandstätter (born 4 June 1949) is an Austrian fencer. He competed in at the 1972, 1976 and 1984 Summer Olympics.
