= Mario Tullio Montano =

Italian fencer (1944–2017)

Personal information
- Born: 7 February 1944 Pistoia, Italy
- Died: 27 July 2017 (aged 73) Livorno, Italy

Sport
- Sport: Fencing
Medal record
Representing Italy
Olympic Games
Gold medal – first place	1972 Munich	Team sabre
Silver medal – second place	1976 Montréal	Team sabre
World Fencing Championships
Bronze medal – third place	1971 Vienna	Team sabre
Bronze medal – third place	1973 Gothenburg	Team sabre
Bronze medal – third place	1974 Grenoble	Team sabre
Summer Universiade
Gold medal – first place	1967 Tokyo	Team sabre
Bronze medal – third place	1967 Tokyo	Individual sabre
Bronze medal – third place	1970 Turin	Team sabre

Mario Tullio Montano (7 February 1944 – 27 July 2017) was an Italian fencer. He won a gold medal in the team sabre event at the 1972 Summer Olympics and a silver in the same event at the 1976 Summer Olympics.

He died on 27 July 2017 at the age of 73.
