= Bernard Vallée =

French fencer (1945–2021)

Personal information
- Born: 5 October 1945 Aubervilliers, France
- Died: 2 April 2021 (aged 76) Rots, Calvados, France

Sport
- Sport: Fencing
Medal record
World Championships
Bronze medal – third place	1966 Moscow	Team sabre
Bronze medal – third place	1967 Montreal	Team sabre
Mediterranean Games
Gold medal – first place	1967 Tunis	Individual sabre
Summer Universiade
Gold medal – first place	1967 Tokyo	Individual sabre
Bronze medal – third place	1967 Tokyo	Team sabre

Bernard Vallée (5 October 1945 – 2 April 2021) was a French sabre fencer. He competed at the 1968 and 1972 Summer Olympics. He also competed at the 1967 Mediterranean Games where he won a gold medal in the individual sabre event.
