= Paul Wischeidt =

German fencer (1944–2026)

Personal information
- Born: 7 February 1944 Dormagen, Gau Düsseldorf, Germany
- Died: 13 May 2026 (aged 82)

Sport
- Sport: Fencing

Paul Wischeidt (7 February 1944 – 13 May 2026) was a German fencer. He competed in the individual and team sabre events at the 1968 and 1972 Summer Olympics.

Wischeidt died on 13 May 2026, at the age of 82.
