= Iosif Budahazi =

Romanian fencer

Personal information
- Born: 25 May 1947 Carei, Romania
- Died: 22 November 2003 (aged 56)
- Height: 1.78 m (5 ft 10 in)
- Weight: 75 kg (165 lb)

Fencing career
- Sport: Fencing
- Country: Romania
- Weapon: sabre

Iosif Budahazi (25 May 1947 – 22 November 2003) was a Romanian fencer. He competed in the individual and team sabre events at the 1972 Summer Olympics.
