= Fritz Prause =

Austrian fencer

Personal information
- Born: 20 March 1949 (age 77)
- Height: 5 ft 10 in (178 cm)
- Weight: 154 lb (70 kg)

Sport
- Country: Austria
- Sport: Fencing
- Retired: Yes

Fritz Prause (born 20 March 1949) is an Austrian fencer. He competed in the individual and team sabre events at the 1972 Summer Olympics.
