= Knut Höhne =

German fencer (born 1949)

Personal information
- Born: 19 November 1949 (age 76) Lübeck, Germany

Sport
- Sport: Fencing

Knut Höhne (born 19 November 1949) is a German fencer. He competed in the individual and team sabre events at the 1972 Summer Olympics.
