= Istvan Kulcsar =

Swiss fencer

Personal information
- Born: 13 September 1936 (age 89)

Sport
- Sport: Fencing

Istvan Kulcsar (born 13 September 1936) is a Swiss fencer. He competed in the individual and team sabre events at the 1972 Summer Olympics.
