= Walter Convents =

German fencer (born 1948)

Personal information
- Born: 8 November 1948 (age 77) Bonn, Allied-occupied Germany

Sport
- Sport: Fencing

Walter Convents (born 8 November 1948) is a German fencer. He competed in the individual and team sabre events at the 1972 Summer Olympics.
