= Janos Mohoss =

Swiss fencer (1936–2020)

Personal information
- Born: 21 June 1936 Budapest, Hungary
- Died: 12 December 2020 (aged 84) Budapest, Hungary

Sport
- Sport: Fencing

Janos Mohoss (21 June 1936 – 12 December 2020) was a Swiss fencer. He competed in the individual and team sabre events at the 1972 Summer Olympics.

Mohoss died from COVID-19 on 12 December 2020, in Budapest during the pandemic in Hungary. He was 84.
