= Constantin Nicolae =

Romanian fencer

Personal information
- Born: 1 January 1939 (age 87) Bucharest, Romania

Sport
- Sport: Fencing

Constantin Nicolae (born 1 January 1939) is a Romanian fencer. He competed in the individual and team sabre events at the 1972 Summer Olympics.
