= Sandor Gombay =

Swiss fencer

Personal information
- Born: 22 October 1938
- Died: 12 January 2015 (aged 76)

Sport
- Sport: Fencing

Sandor Gombay (22 October 1938 – 12 January 2015) was a Swiss fencer. He competed in the individual and team sabre events at the 1972 Summer Olympics.
