= Ralph Hollett =

Canadian boxer (1952–2015)

Personal information
- Nickname: The Heat
- Nationality: (Canada) Canadian
- Born: Ralph Richard J. Hollett; November 24, 1952 Halifax, Nova Scotia, Canada
- Died: June 14, 2012 (aged 59) Halifax, Nova Scotia, Canada
- Weight: Middleweight

Boxing career

Boxing record
- Total fights: 30
- Wins: 19
- Win by KO: 9
- Losses: 10
- Draws: 1

Ralph Hollett (November 24, 1952 – June 14, 2012) was a Canadian former professional middleweight boxer and kickboxer who won the Canadian middleweight boxing title three times.

== Early life ==
Ralph Richard J. Hollett was born on November 24, 1952, in Halifax, Nova Scotia, Canada.

== Kickboxing career ==
Hollett trained under Jim Maloney. He reached the rank of black belt in karate, Uechi-Ryū, and jiu-jitsu.

He competed against world middleweight full contact karate champion Bill Wallace in a non-title bout in June 1978 but was defeated by unanimous decision.

On November 7, 1978, he suffered a knockout loss to kickboxer Jean-Yves Thériault for the Canadian middleweight full contact championship in Ottawa, Ontario. He became the Canadian middleweight kickboxing champion on November 27, 1979, by defeating Thériault in their rematch. His punching advantage allowed him to rock the former champion multiple times, including a knockdown in the fifth round.

== Professional boxing career ==
Hollett made his debut as a professional boxer in 1977 without any amateur boxing experience. His trainer was Tom McCluskey.

Hollett's bid for the eastern Canadian middleweight championship fell short in April 1979 when he dropped a points decision to Don Johnson at the Halifax Metro Centre (now Scotiabank Centre).

His first main event came at 26, at which point he had compiled a 5–5 record across ten professional fights in two years.

=== Taking the Canadian middleweight championship, January 1980 ===
Hollett won the Canadian middleweight boxing title from Fernand Marcotte at the Halifax Metro Centre in January 1980.

=== Losing the Canadian middleweight championship to Chris Clarke, April 1980 ===
The Canadian Boxing Federation authorized his first title defense, pitting him against fellow Halifax fighter Chris Clarke, who was stepping up from the welterweight division. He struggled against Clarke's fighting style, having never previously encountered a southpaw opponent.

=== Taking the Canadian middleweight championship, September 1980 ===
After losing his title by unanimous decision to the former Commonwealth welterweight champion in April 1980, he reclaimed his middleweight title in September by stopping Clarke with a knockout in the second round.

==== Notable bouts during middleweight title reign ====
In January 1981, he faced Eddie Melo for the first time, retaining his Canadian middleweight championship. Hollett successfully defended his middleweight title against former champion Fernand Marcotte at the Paul Sauvé Arena in June 1981. The twelve-round bout ended in a ninth-round technical knockout when Marcotte couldn't come out for the next round.

Hollett beat Elisha Obed of the Bahamas by unanimous decision in Halifax on August 25, 1981. He had climbed to eighth in the World Boxing Council rankings by 1982.

=== Losing the Canadian middleweight championship, January 1982 ===
When the Canadian champion stepped on the scale before his January 1982 fight with Wayne Caplette, he came in over the 160-pound limit and was stripped of his title. Hollett, holding a record of 12–6–1, defeated 23-1 Caplette by unanimous decision.

=== Taking the Canadian middleweight championship, June 1982 ===
His June 1982 win against Bennie Briscoe was followed by a rematch TKO victory over Eddie Melo. He then claimed the vacant middleweight championship for the third time with a title-winning performance against Lancelot Innis.

He lost his last four fights in 1983. These included a pair of unsuccessful title shots against Roy Gumbs for the Commonwealth Boxing Council middleweight title and a final career bout against Alex Hilton for the vacant Canadian middleweight championship.

The former three-time Canadian boxing champion retired from boxing in 1985.

== Professional boxing record ==
30 fights	19 wins	10 losses
By knockout	9	4
By decision	10	6
Draws	1	

== Personal life ==
His son, Roger Hollett, followed in his footsteps.

== Death ==
Ralph Hollett died in Halifax, Nova Scotia, Canada, on June 14, 2012, at 59. He suffered from cancer and had an inoperable tumor in his brain.

== Legacy ==
Hollett is a 2025 Nova Scotia Sport Hall of Fame inductee.
