= Carroll Morgan (boxer) =

Canadian boxer (1947–2018)

Personal information
- Nationality: (Canada) Canadian
- Born: Carroll Morgan; October 3, 1947 Antigonish, Nova Scotia, Canada
- Died: June 20, 2018 Halifax, Nova Scotia, Canada
- Height: 6 ft 1 in (185 cm)
- Weight: Heavyweight

Boxing career

Carroll Morgan (October 3, 1947 – June 20, 2018) was a Canadian heavyweight boxer who represented his native country at the 1972 Summer Olympics in Munich, West Germany. There he was defeated in the quarterfinals by Sweden's eventual bronze medalist Hasse Thomsén.

== Early life and education ==
Carroll Morgan was born on October 3, 1947, in Antigonish, Nova Scotia, Canada. He grew up in Whiteside, Nova Scotia. He was one of seven children, with five brothers and a sister.

He enrolled at St. Francis Xavier University in Antigonish and worked towards his Bachelor of Arts degree. Morgan became a walk-on with the St. Francis Xavier X-Men football team and contributed to their 1966 Vanier Cup debut.

== Amateur boxing career ==
While in university, he began working out with his roommate Rocky MacDougall, the future Canadian featherweight champion, who introduced him to boxing in 1968. Morgan started training under coach John Cechetto in Sydney, Nova Scotia.

With only two fights, he made the national team and competed at the 1971 Canada Winter Games in Saskatoon, where he lost a split decision to heavyweight Jack Meda. That fall, he joined the Canadian national team's European tour, scoring knockouts in Sweden and the Netherlands before dropping a split decision in Norway. His heavy training for the Olympics began in December 1971.

Morgan secured the 1972 Maritime amateur heavyweight title in Sydney with a first-round knockout, which sent him to the Eastern Canadian Olympic trials in Sept-Îles, Quebec.

At the Canadian National Championships held at the Saskatoon Arena in May 1972, he captured the title in the heavyweight division. The 24-year-old was named the "outstanding fighter" of the championships. Following the national championships, he was selected for the national Olympic team.

His most notable success came in 1972, when he represented Canada at the 1972 Summer Olympics in Munich. He was within one victory of capturing a bronze medal in the heavyweight division.

=== 1972 Summer Olympics results ===
Below are the results of Carroll Morgan, a Canadian heavyweight boxer who competed at the 1972 Munich Olympics:

- Round of 16: defeated Fatai Ayinla (Nigeria) by decision, 3-2
- Quarterfinal: lost to Hasse Thomsén (Sweden) by third-round knockout

Following the Munich Olympics, he enrolled at Saint Mary’s University to earn a Bachelor of Education. He also played as a defensive end on the Saint Mary's Huskies football team, which won the conference but lost in the national semifinals.

By 1973, he began training under Tom McCluskey. Morgan scored a unanimous decision win over 1973 New York Golden Gloves champion Kevin Isaac on April 9, 1973.

In three years, he fought fourteen fights and won ten, including seven by knockout. That year, he was given both the provincial title and the Maritime amateur crown in Saint John, each by default when no opponents were available.

He successfully defended his heavyweight title at the CABA Canadian National Championships in Charlottetown on May 25, 1973. Advancing to the North American amateur boxing championships, he competed at Uniondale's Nassau Coliseum on May 28, 1973. He emerged as the North American heavyweight champion with a first round knockout.

=== 1974 Commonwealth Games ===
Out of 140 athletes picked to represent Canada at the 1974 British Commonwealth Games in Christchurch, New Zealand, he was the sole Atlantic-Canadian. Holding Canadian and North American amateur heavyweight titles, he competed as one of six members of the Canadian Commonwealth Games boxing team coached by Harold Mann.

In 1988, a torn muscle suffered in sparring forced Morgan to retire from boxing, though he continued coaching both boxing and football. Following his retirement from boxing, he pursued a 20-year career as a schoolteacher.

== Death ==
On June 20, 2018, Morgan died of a heart attack at his home in the Clayton Park area of Halifax. He was 70.

== Legacy ==
His boxing career brought him seven provincial, four Atlantic, and three Canadian championships. No Canadian opponent ever beat Morgan.

In 1990, Carrol Morgan was inducted into the Canadian Boxing Hall of Fame. He was inducted twice into the Nova Scotia Sport Hall of Fame, in 1994 alongside his teammates from the 1966 X-Men football club of St. Francis Xavier University in Antigonish, Nova Scotia, and in 2008 as an amateur boxer. He was inducted into the Cape Breton Sport Hall of Fame on June 1, 2018. Carroll Morgan Park in Timberlea, Nova Scotia, was named after the boxer in September 2025.
