= Ludeña =

Ludeña is a surname most commonly used in Peru. Notable people with the surname include:

- Antonio Ludeña (1740–1810), Spanish mathematician
- Oscar Ludeña (1946–2023), Peruvian boxer
- Pedro Pablo Nakada Ludeña (born 1973), Peruvian serial killer
