= Leonard Sinclair Sparks =

Canadian professional boxer (1939–2021)

Len Sparks
Personal information
- Nicknames: Len, Lennie
- Nationality: (Canada) Canadian
- Born: Leonard Sinclair Sparks; March 28, 1939 Waverley, Nova Scotia
- Died: March 19, 2021 (aged 81) Halifax, Nova Scotia
- Weight: Welterweight

Boxing career
- Stance: Switch hitter

Boxing record
- Total fights: 38
- Wins: 28
- Win by KO: 17
- Losses: 10

Leonard Sinclair Sparks (March 28, 1939 – March 19, 2021) was a Canadian welterweight boxer who won three Canadian boxing titles, including the Maritime welterweight championship, the Canadian junior welterweight championship, and the Canadian welterweight championship. Sparks was a switch hitter, who had power in both hands and finished his career with 28 wins, 10 losses, and 2 draws, including 17 knockouts. Sparks would appear on match cards in Madison Square Garden and the Boston Garden in the 1960s. He was also scheduled to appear in Madison Square Garden against Charley Scott of Philadelphia on the undercard of the first bout of Muhammad Ali vs. Floyd Patterson. The Muhammad Ali vs. Floyd Patterson bout would be relocated to the Las Vegas Convention Center, and Lennie would instead fight Charley Scott in the Boston Garden.

== Early life ==
Leonard Sinclair Sparks was born in Waverley, Nova Scotia on March 28, 1939. His parents were Lillian (née Williams) Sparks and Harold Sparks Sr.

== Amateur boxing career ==
Sparks' short amateur run saw him win both of his two fights by knockout.

== Professional boxing career ==
Lennie came out of the Creighton Street gym in Halifax, Nova Scotia, which was run by the Paris brothers of New Glasgow. Lennie Sparks was known as a switch hitter in boxing because he could knock opponents out with either hand. He once told New Glasgow's Hugh Townsend how training with Keith Paris at the Creighton Street gym helped him grow into a hard puncher with a knack for good defence.

He went on to be trained by "Young Tom" McCluskey who helped Sparks take both the Canadian junior welterweight and Canadian welterweight titles.

Lennie Sparks turned pro on May 10, 1956, in Halifax, winning his pro debut against Keith Paris by knockout.

On October 6, 1959, Sparks knocked out Jackie Hayden of Westville in Pictou County to win the Canadian light welterweight title. He held the title until 1962.

In his next fight he would score a TKO over Bernie Raines in Halifax before taking the opportunity to fight his first bout in the United States. On December 17, 1959, Sparks would fight against Willie Bey in the New Alhambra Arena in South Philadelphia, winning by points. He returned home and fought three fights in which he went 2–1 before returning to the United States. On January 28, 1961, Sparks fought against Vince Shomo at Madison Square Garden in New York City. The six-round fight resulted in a points win for Shomo.

In April 1965, he came under the management of New York's George Gainford who managed former world champion Sugar Ray Robinson.

Following his August 1965 knockout of Dave "Sugar" Wyatt in Saint John, Sparks relocated to Montreal to train with Roy Hamilton and a team of sparring partners. Up to that point, he had been dropped just once in 36 pro fights and won 19 of his fights by KO.

Six years after winning the Canadian junior welterweight title, a 25-year-old Sparks defeated Peter Schmidt of Toronto by a fifth-round TKO to claim the Canadian welterweight title on October 17, 1965. He had now won Canadian boxing titles in three different weight divisions. The newly crowned welterweight champion Lennie Sparks would head back to the United States and fight two more times in the following month of November. First, he would fight Dick French of Providence, Rhode Island, losing a close decision in the Boston Garden. 21 days later, he was scheduled to appear in Madison Square Garden against Charley Scott of Philadelphia on the undercard of the first Muhammad Ali vs. Floyd Patterson bout on November 22, 1965. The Muhammad Ali vs. Floyd Patterson fight would be relocated to the Las Vegas Convention Center, and Lennie would instead fight Charley Scott in the Boston Garden in Boston. Sparks would knock Charley Scott down twice in the first round but was knocked out shortly after in the second round. Two weeks after he was knocked out in Boston by Charley Scott, he was scheduled to fight a non-title bout in Montreal's Paul Sauvé Arena against Joey Durelle of Baie-Sainte-Anne, New Brunswick. The fight would go all ten rounds and result in a unanimous decision loss for Lennie Sparks. The president of the Canadian Professional Boxing Federation told Nanaimo Daily News that Sparks was "lucky" he was not seriously injured and should not have been allowed to fight.

After a nearly eight-month layoff, Lennie Sparks would fight Jim Meilleur in another non-title bout and lose a ten-round decision in Summerside, Prince Edward Island.

On May 11, 1967, Sparks would lose his Canadian welterweight title through a unanimous 12-round decision in favour of Fernand Simard at the Granby Arena in Granby, Quebec. Despite his loss, the Canadian Professional Boxing Federation would declare the fight with Fernand a non-title bout and Sparks was still regarded as the champion. The CPBF then ordered Sparks to defend the title against the top contender Joey Durelle. He would officially lose his Canadian welterweight boxing title to Durelle by unanimous decision in August 1967 in Fredericton.

5 years after the title loss, the former Canadian welterweight champion would return to the ring a final time to fight Jerry Wells of Cleveland, Ohio, knocking him out in the sixth round in Halifax, Nova Scotia.

Sparks' career would span from 1956 to 1972. The Nova Scotian boxer fought in 40 bouts and finished with a record of 28(17 KOs)-10-2. He was once ranked the 10th welterweight in the world.

== Professional boxing record ==
40 fights	28 wins	10 losses
By knockout	17	1
By decision	11	9
Draws	2	

== Personal life ==
Sparks was a veteran who served in the Canadian Army Reserve Unit. He worked for the Canadian National Railway and would retire after 34 years of service. He was a Shriner of Philae and a former Worshipful Master of Masons Equity Lodge 106.

== Honors and awards ==
- 2007 Black Ice Hockey and Sports Hall of Fame inductee
- 2018 Canadian Professional Boxing Council Honorary Lifetime Champion Award
- 2019 Maritime Sport Hall of Fame inductee

== Death ==
Sparks died on March 19, 2021, in Halifax, Nova Scotia, Canada, at the age of 81.
