= Rocky MacDougall =

Canadian boxer (1943–2009)

Personal information
- Nickname: Rocky
- Nationality: (Canada) Canadian
- Born: Francis MacDougall; 1943 Sydney Mines, Nova Scotia, Canada
- Died: June 12, 2009 (aged 65–66) Antigonish, Nova Scotia, Canada
- Height: 5 ft 9 in (175 cm)
- Weight: Featherweight

Boxing career

Boxing record
- Total fights: 27
- Wins: 20
- Win by KO: 8
- Losses: 7

Rocky MacDougall (1943 – June 12, 2009) was a Canadian former professional featherweight boxer who won the Canadian featherweight title in 1969.

== Early life ==
Francis "Rocky" MacDougall was born in Sydney Mines, Nova Scotia, Canada, and grew up in Whitney Pier.

== Amateur boxing career ==
MacDougall began boxing as an amateur in 1958–59. His amateur boxing experience was limited to three bouts.

== Professional career ==
Rocky MacDougall turned professional in 1960, training under manager-trainer John Cechetto in the basement of the Venetian Gardens in Sydney, Nova Scotia.

He began working toward a Bachelor of Arts at St. Francis Xavier University in Antigonish by the mid-1960s.

In October 1965, he spoiled the debut of Marcel Bellefeuille by scoring a knockout over the 1960 Olympian.

=== Losing the Canadian featherweight championship to Billy McGrandle, June 1966 ===
MacDougall signed in December 1965 to meet Billy McGrandle in Edmonton for McGrandle’s first title defense. Facing McGrandle on June 6, 1966, he lost a 12-round decision to the newly pro boxer with only five losses in 175 amateur bouts.

In their August rematch, MacDougall again lost by unanimous decision for the featherweight crown.

=== Taking the Canadian featherweight championship, November 1969 ===
The Canadian Professional Boxing Federation stripped McGrandle after he missed his scheduled bout with MacDougall on June 5, 1968. MacDougall then became the number one contender for the vacant title, with bantamweight champion Jackie Burke ranked second. MacDougall went on to capture the Canadian featherweight championship in November 1969 with a TKO over Burke in Sydney, Nova Scotia.

==== Notable bouts during featherweight title reign ====
He took fights at lightweight, and after a win over the leading contender Fernand Durelle, he lost a decision in a rematch with Canadian junior lightweight champion Les Gillis on May 18, 1970.

In July 1970, he took on Lawrence Hafey, who would go on to become Canadian middleweight champion, and was stopped in the fourth round by TKO.

One year after his loss to Hafey, he retained his featherweight title at the Halifax Forum on July 1, 1971, in his third fight against rival Billy McGrandle. MacDougall held the title until he retired in May 1972.

== Post-boxing career ==
At the time of his retirement, he was studying business administration.

He also moved into refereeing and judging after his boxing career. MacDougall was involved with the Canadian Amateur Boxing Association and Boxing Nova Scotia. He officiated as an International Olympic AIBA referee and judge at the 1974 North American Boxing Championships in Miami, Florida.

He graduated from StFX University in 1974. MacDougall, with degrees in business administration and education, spent 27 years teaching in the Antigonish-Guysborough area.

He served as an assistant boxing coach at the 1990 Commonwealth Games, the 1992 Barcelona Olympics, the 1998 Commonwealth Games, and the 1999 Pan American Games.

He held roles as director of the Canadian Professional Boxing Federation and member of the Nova Scotia Boxing Authority from 1999 until 2009.

== Death ==
Rocky MacDougall died on June 12, 2009, in Antigonish, Nova Scotia, at age 66.

== Awards and recognitions ==
- 1987 Nova Scotia Sport Hall of Fame inductee
- 2000 Boxing Canada Hall of Fame inductee

Achievements
Preceded by Billy McGrandle	Canadian Featherweight Champion; November 17, 1969 – May 1972	Succeeded by Tony Salvatore
