= Lawrence Hafey =

Canadian boxer

Personal information
- Nicknames: Irish Larry; Nova Scotia Wildcat
- Nationality: (Canada) Canadian
- Born: Lawrence Hafey Pictou County, Nova Scotia, Canada
- Weight: Welterweight; Middleweight

Boxing career
- Stance: Orthodox

Boxing record
- Total fights: 77
- Wins: 50
- Win by KO: 18
- Losses: 24
- Draws: 3

Lawrence Hafey (born c. 1950) is a Canadian former professional welterweight and middleweight boxer. He held the Canadian middleweight boxing title from 1975 to 1976.

== Early life ==
Lawrence Hafey was born around 1950 in Pictou County, Nova Scotia, Canada.

== Amateur boxing career ==
Fighting out of Stellarton, Hafey's amateur record consisted of more than 40 bouts.

== Professional career ==
On February 19, 1967, Hafey stepped into the ring against Ken MacIntyre for his first professional boxing match. He met MacIntyre in four matches that year, splitting them between Baie-Sainte-Anne, New Brunswick, and New Glasgow, with each location yielding one loss and one draw.

=== Losses against reigning Canadian junior lightweight champion Les Gillis, 1968–1969 ===
He lost against Canadian junior lightweight champion Les Gillis in October 1968 and November 1969.

=== Attempt at the Canadian lightweight championship, May 1970 ===
He maintained his status as the top-ranked contender for the Canadian lightweight championship over a two-year stretch. His 1970 unanimous decision victory over lightweight contender Fernand Durelle earned him a shot at the title. Hafey challenged the unbeaten Al Ford, who held a perfect 28–0 record, for the Canadian lightweight title in New Glasgow during May 1970. He lost the twelve-round bout by split decision.

=== Important win over Canadian featherweight champion Rocky MacDougall, July 1970 ===
He scored a fourth-round technical knockout against Canadian featherweight champion Rocky MacDougall in July 1970. Another significant win came in June 1972 when he defeated Gerald Bouchard, a future Canadian middleweight champion.

=== Taking the Eastern Canadian welterweight championship, July 1973 ===
On July 7, 1973, in Bedeque, P.E.I., the 23 year old entered the ring against Don Boutler from Victoria, P.E.I., for a 10-round contest. Hafey won by knockout at 1:42 of the second round to win the Eastern Canadian welterweight title.

He traveled to California alongside his brother Art to fight on on the undercard of Muhammad Ali vs. Ken Norton in March 1973. Fighting with a sprained foot, he dropped a decision to Gonzalo Rodriguez in his only appearance in San Diego.

Hafey sealed a five-year contract with Ottawa fight promoter Vern Stevenson in November 1974, and after the signing, he claimed victories in a pair of U.S. bouts scheduled with only 48 hours between them.

=== Loss against undefeated Wilfred Benítez, December 1974 ===
At New York's Felt Forum in December 1974, Hafey fought Wilfred Benítez (who had never lost a match) and lost.

=== Loss against reigning WBC junior lightweight champion Bruno Arcari, December 1974 ===
11 days after the Benítez loss, the 24-year-old Nova Scotian traveled to Milan, Italy, and faced WBC junior welterweight champion Bruno Arcari, who held a 63–2–0 record. The ten-round non-title bout took place on December 13, 1974, at Allianz Cloud Arena. Hafey went the distance with the champion from Italy and lost a decision.

=== Taking the Canadian middleweight championship, May 1975 ===
Lawrence Hafey won the Canadian middleweight title in May 1975. In a closely contested title bout, he claimed a split decision victory over champion David Downey from Halifax.

=== Loss against reigning Canadian and British Commonwealth welterweight champion Clyde Gray, December 1975 ===
He faced Canadian and British Commonwealth welterweight champion Clyde Gray for the Commonwealth Boxing Council welterweight title on December 1, 1975. Entering the ring with a 40–14–2 record, he was stopped at 2:31 of the eighth round. A record 6,200 fans filled the Halifax Forum to watch the Nova Scotian fighters.

By September 1975, Jerry Fraser had taken over as his manager following the end of his association with Vern Stevenson. His Montreal debut came that month at age 26, when he defeated Walpole's Paul Osborne at the Paul Sauvé Arena, earning himself a shot at the title.

=== Losing the Canadian middleweight championship to Fernand Marcotte, March 1976 ===
In March 1976, he was unable to retain the Canadian middleweight title, suffering a defeat at the hands of Quebec City's Fernand Marcotte.

Hafey traveled to London, England, in May 1979, fighting Dave Boy Green at Empire Pool (now Wembley Arena). Following a TKO loss, he lost five straight fights to mark the end of his career, including losses to Chris Clarke, Sean Mannion, and Mario Cusson.

== Professional boxing record ==
77 fights	50 wins	24 losses
By knockout	18	4
By decision	32	20
Draws	3	

== Personal life ==
His younger brother, Art Hafey, went on to become ranked among the world's top featherweight fighters.

== Legacy ==
The Pictou County Sports Hall of Fame welcomed Hafey as an inductee in 1992.

Hafey earned his place in the Nova Scotia Sport Hall of Fame in 2013.
