= Mario Cusson =

Canadian boxer (1961–1996)

Personal information
- Nationality: (Canada) Canadian
- Born: Mario Cusson; February 17, 1961 Montreal, Quebec
- Died: November 7, 1996 (aged 35) Canada
- Occupation: Boxer
- Height: 5 ft 8 in (173cm)
- Weight: Welterweight; Lightweight

Boxing career
- Stance: Orthodox

Boxing record
- Total fights: 37
- Wins: 30
- Win by KO: 12
- Losses: 5
- Draws: 2

Mario Cusson (February 17, 1961 – November 7, 1996) was a Canadian professional welterweight and lightweight boxer who won the Canadian welterweight championship in 1981.

== Early life ==
Mario Cusson was born on February 17, 1961, in Montreal, Quebec, Canada.

== Amateur boxing career ==
He began boxing at twelve years old.

== Professional career ==
Mario Cusson turned pro in 1978. He trained under Georges Drouin.

Cusson compiled notable victories over Lawrence Hafey and Al Ford in 1981 as he established himself as a contender in the welterweight division.

=== Taking the Canadian welterweight championship, September 1981 ===
When former champion Clyde Gray retired, the welterweight title was left vacant. Cusson, then 15-1-1 and Canada's second-ranked welterweight, met third-ranked Bob Harvey on September 29, 1981, for the vacant Canadian championship. Fighting at the Paul Sauvé Arena, the 20-year-old earned a twelve-round unanimous decision victory over Harvey to win the welterweight title. The Cusson-Harvey title bout drew a crowd of 3,383.

==== Notable bouts during welterweight title reign ====
Cusson successfully defended his title twice in 1982, defeating Allen Clarke in January and future welterweight champion Donnie Poole in October.

Following a split from trainer Georges Drouin in November 1982, Cusson traveled to Miami in January 1983 with Deano Clavet. He traveled to Miami to train under Chuck Talhami at the famed 5th Street Gym.

Cusson made his third successful defense of his Canadian welterweight championship in May 1983, outpointing John Herbert at the Paul Sauvé Arena.

With his Canadian welterweight title on the line, he made his fourth title defense against undefeated Dave Hilton Jr. at the Montreal Forum on December 4, 1983. Cusson entered the bout at 137.3 pounds, and Hilton came in with a nine-pound weight advantage at 146.2 pounds. The referee Guy Jutras called a technical draw at 1:33 of the third round after an unintentional headbutt opened a cut on Cusson, who retained his championship. The Canadian welterweight title fight attracted a crowd of approximately 20,000 and grossed more than $800,000 at the gate. It marked the highest attendance for a sports event in the venue's 59-year history. The bout generated career-high purses for both fighters, with Cusson earning $130,000 and Hilton collecting $118,000.

=== Losing the Canadian welterweight championship, March 1983 ===
An immediate rematch between Cusson and Hilton was sanctioned by the Canadian Boxing Federation. Cusson prepared for three weeks in Toronto, sparring with Shawn O'Sullivan. The rematch with Hilton was postponed in September 1983 after Cusson fractured his left hand during a training session. After months of delays, the 23-year-old was knocked out by Hilton in the rematch for the Canadian welterweight championship on March 25, 1984. The fight ended in only 29 seconds of the first round. Both bouts against Hilton took place at the Montreal Forum and generated a combined gate of approximately 40,000 fans, with Cusson earning $260,000 in combined purses.

Cusson dropped to lightweight after losing to Hilton, capturing a 10-round decision over former world champion Claude Noel in July 1984 at 135 pounds.

=== Attempt at the Canadian lightweight championship, March 1985 ===
In a bid for the Canadian lightweight title on March 26, 1985, Cusson fell to Remo Di Carlo via eleventh-round stoppage. Cusson was hospitalized following the fight, where tests revealed a subdural hematoma that had existed prior to the bout.

Cusson declared his retirement in 1985, investing in a 28-unit apartment building in Montreal's east end and launching a boxing gym. He returned to training in 1987, working under Dave Hilton Sr., father of the fighter who had defeated him for the title in 1984. His final bout was on June 25, 1988, against Eduardo Valdez. He lost by majority decision after an eight-round fight. Cusson hung up his gloves again after the loss in Atlantic City.

At 35, Cusson began training for a potential comeback in 1996 but took his own life before it could materialize.

== Professional boxing record ==
37 fights	30 wins	5 losses
By knockout	12	3
By decision	18	2
Draws	2	

== Death ==
Mario Cusson died on November 7, 1996, in Montreal, Quebec, Canada.

Achievements
Preceded by Vacant	Canadian Welterweight Champion; September 29, 1981 – March 25, 1984	Succeeded by Dave Hilton Jr.
