= Folstad =

Surname list

Folstad or Følstad is a surname. Notable people with the surname include:

- Astrid Folstad (1932–2009), Norwegian actress
- Gunhild Følstad (born 1981), Norwegian footballer
- Rick Folstad (born 1951), American boxer
