= Tom McCluskey (trainer) =

Canadian boxing coach (1924–2012)

Personal information
- Nickname: Young Tom
- Nationality: (Canada) Canadian
- Born: Thomas George McCluskey; May 23, 1924 Charlottetown, Prince Edward Island
- Died: February 7, 2012 (aged 87) Dartmouth, Nova Scotia
- Occupations: Boxer; Boxing coach
- Weight: Welterweight

Boxing career

Tom McCluskey (May 23, 1924 – February 7, 2012) was a Canadian former boxer and boxing trainer. He was one of Canada's most respected boxing coaches.

== Early history ==
Thomas George McCluskey was born on May 23, 1924, in Charlottetown, Prince Edward Island. He was the eldest of four brothers and one sister. His father, Bernie, was a boxer, and his uncle, Tom "One-Man" McCluskey, fought professionally in Maine and competed in the White Hope Tournament in New York.

== Amateur boxing career ==
In October 1937, Tom McCluskey's amateur boxing career began at 13 years old. McCluskey was undefeated in over 30 amateur bouts. At 16, he enlisted in the Navy and served from 1940 to 1945. From 1946 to 1947, "Young Tom" turned pro and went 2-1 throughout 3 professional bouts in the United States until his boxing career ended abruptly. While serving as a stoker in the Royal Canadian Navy during World War II, McCluskey, then 24 years old, sustained a double skull fracture in 1948.

== Coaching career ==
McCluskey began managing and training boxers in Dartmouth, Nova Scotia, where his wife, Gloria McCluskey, eventually became mayor before the town was incorporated into Halifax. In addition to Canadian boxers Richard "Kid" Howard, David Downey, Lennie Sparks, Buddy Daye, Les Sprague, Blair Richardson, and Les Gillis, he also trained many other renowned fighters.

Under Tom McCluskey's guidance, Trevor Berbick entered the professional ranks following the 1976 Summer Olympics and won his first 11 matches. He trained Berbick for two years. Following a brief split, McCluskey returned to corner Berbick in a bout against John Tate on the undercard of Sugar Ray Leonard-Roberto Durán in 1980.

Kickboxing champion Ralph Hollett trained under McCluskey from 1977 to 1983, and he went on to become one of Canada's top middleweight boxers.

During the late 1970s, McCluskey was hired and employed for several years teaching self-defence to the Montreal Canadiens farm team based in Nova Scotia, the Nova Scotia Voyageurs.

== Death ==
Tom McCluskey died in Dartmouth, Nova Scotia, Canada, on February 7, 2012, at 87 years old.

== Honors and awards ==
- 1982 Canadian Boxing Federation Trainer of the Year Award
- 1989 Canadian Boxing Hall of Fame inductee
- 1999 Prince Edward Island Sports Hall of Fame inductee
