= Dave Hilton Jr. =

Canadian boxer (born 1963)

Personal information
- Nickname: Davey
- Born: 9 December 1963 (age 62) Port Credit, Ontario, Canada
- Height: 5 ft 8 in (1.73 m)
- Weight: Super middleweight

Boxing career
- Stance: Orthodox

Boxing record
- Total fights: 45
- Wins: 41
- Win by KO: 26
- Losses: 2
- Draws: 2

Dave "Davey" Hilton Jr. (born December 9, 1963) is a Canadian former boxing world champion. He is also known for being convicted of sexually assaulting two of his daughters.

He is the older brother of former light middleweight world champion of boxing, Matthew Hilton.

== Professional boxing career ==
He briefly held the WBC super middleweight title after defeating Dingaan Thobela in December 2000, but shortly thereafter, the WBC stripped it from him after child molestation charges were leveled against him. Hilton suffered only two losses in his career, to fellow Canadians Stephane Ouellet, and Alain Bonnamie. He later avenged the loss to Bonnamie, and has previously knocked out Ouellet twice.

== Professional boxing record ==
45 fights	41 wins	2 losses
By knockout	26	0
By decision	15	2
Draws	2	

No.	Result	Record	Opponent	Type	Round, time	Date	Location	Notes
45	Win	41–2–2	Adam Green	UD	10	01/05/2007	Maurice Richard Arena, Montreal, Quebec, Canada	98-91, 97-92, 98-91.
44	Win	40–2–2	Dingaan Thobela	SD	12	15/12/2000	Molson Centre, Montreal, Quebec, Canada	WBC World Super Middleweight Title
43	Loss	39–2–2	Stephane Ouellet	UD	10	08/09/2000	Molson Centre, Montreal, Quebec, Canada	90-99, 89-100, 90-99.
42	Win	39–1–2	Eddie Hall	UD	10	29/02/2000	Centre Pierre Charbonneau, Montreal, Quebec, Canada	96-94, 96-94, 96-94.
41	Win	38–1–2	Stephane Ouellet	TKO	3	28/05/1999	Molson Centre, Montreal, Quebec, Canada	Canada Middleweight Title
40	Win	37–1–2	Stephane Ouellet	TKO	12	27/11/1998	Molson Centre, Montreal, Quebec, Canada	Canada Middleweight Title
39	Win	36–1–2	Joe Stevenson	TKO	4	14/10/1998	Centre Pierre Charbonneau, Montreal, Quebec, Canada	Referee stopped the bout at 2:38 of the fourth round.
38	Win	35–1–2	Derrick Graham	SD	8	28/05/1998	Westchester County Center, White Plains, New York, U.S.	75-77, 78-74, 78-74.
37	Win	34–1–2	Alain Bonnamie	UD	10	08/04/1997	Molson Centre, Montreal, Quebec, Canada	98-93, 96-94, 97-93.
36	Draw	33–1–2	Alain Bonnamie	MD	10	17/12/1996	Complexe sportif Claude-Robillard, Montreal, Quebec, Canada	95-95, 95-95, 96-94.
35	Win	33–1–1	Hughes Daigneault	KO	4	22/10/1996	Hippodrome de Montréal, Montreal, Quebec, Canada	
34	Win	32–1–1	Fitzgerald Bruney	TKO	7	11/02/1993	Niagara Falls Memorial Arena, Niagara Falls, Ontario, Canada	
33	Win	31–1–1	Aaron Smith	UD	10	19/05/1992	Quebec City, Canada	98-91, 99-90, 98-91.
32	Win	30–1–1	Steve Langley	TKO	8	10/04/1992	Verdun, Quebec, Canada	Referee stopped the bout at 2:31 of the eighth round.
31	Win	29–1–1	Ricky Thomas	SD	10	11/02/1992	Verdun, Quebec, Canada	97-93, 96-94, 94-96.
30	Win	28–1–1	Anthony Ivory	UD	10	12/11/1991	Verdun Auditorium, Verdun, Quebec, Canada	98-92, 99-91, 99-91.
29	Loss	27–1–1	Alain Bonnamie	SD	10	25/10/1990	Montreal Forum, Montreal, Quebec, Canada	95-94, 94-95, 94-96.
28	Win	27–0–1	Richard Gagnon	KO	1	27/06/1989	Paul Sauvé Arena, Montreal, Quebec, Canada	Gagnon knocked out at 0:32 of the first round.
27	Win	26–0–1	Steve Little	UD	10	14/03/1989	Resorts Casino Hotel, Atlantic City, New Jersey, U.S.	97-94, 97-93, 98-94.
26	Win	25–0–1	Ron Amundsen	UD	10	29/09/1988	Caesars, Atlantic City, New Jersey, U.S.	100-89, 100-89, 99-91.
25	Win	24–0–1	Hector Rosario	MD	10	22/01/1988	Atlantic City Convention Center, Atlantic City, New Jersey, U.S.	96-96, 96-95, 97-93.
24	Win	23–0–1	Dennis Horne	TKO	2	06/06/1985	Riviera Casino, Las Vegas, Nevada, U.S.	WBC Continental Americas Welterweight Title.
23	Win	22–0–1	Dennis Fain	TKO	2	15/03/1985	Riviera Casino, Las Vegas, Nevada, U.S.	Referee stopped the bout at 1:48 of the second round.
22	Win	21–0–1	Sammy Horne	RTD	3	22/01/1985	Montreal Forum, Montreal, Quebec, Canada	Horne retired at 3:00 of the third round.
21	Win	20–0–1	Pete Padilla	TKO	2	11/12/1984	Paul Sauvé Arena, Montreal, Quebec, Canada	WBC Continental Americas Welterweight Title.
20	Win	19–0–1	Denis Sigouin	TKO	10	10/07/1984	Montreal Forum, Montreal, Quebec, Canada	WBC Continental Americas/Canada Welterweight Titles.
19	Win	18–0–1	Mario Cusson	KO	1	25/03/1984	Montreal Forum, Montreal, Quebec, Canada	Canada Welterweight Title
18	Draw	17–0–1	Mario Cusson	TD	3	04/12/1983	Montreal Forum, Montreal, Quebec, Canada	Canada Welterweight Title
17	Win	17–0	Bruce Strauss	KO	3	29/07/1983	Cornwall, Ontario, Canada	
16	Win	16–0	Pedro Acosta	KO	2	21/06/1983	Paul Sauvé Arena, Montreal, Quebec, Canada	Acosta knocked out at 1:47 of the second round.
15	Win	15–0	Sam Gervins	UD	8	15/02/1983	Paul Sauvé Arena, Montreal, Quebec, Canada	
14	Win	14–0	Bob Harvey	KO	3	25/01/1983	Paul Sauvé Arena, Montreal, Quebec, Canada	Harvey knocked out at 0:33 of the third round.
13	Win	13–0	Mike Blunt	KO	1	14/12/1982	Paul Sauvé Arena, Montreal, Quebec, Canada	Blunt knocked out at 2:25 of the first round.
12	Win	12–0	Jean Paul Petrin	KO	6	12/11/1982	Paul Sauvé Arena, Montreal, Quebec, Canada	Petrin knocked out at 1:06 of the sixth round.
11	Win	11–0	Tim Elliot	KO	2	19/10/1982	Paul Sauvé Arena, Montreal, Quebec, Canada	Elliot knocked out at 1:37 of the second round.
10	Win	10–0	Bobby Green	KO	1	21/09/1982	Paul Sauvé Arena, Montreal, Quebec, Canada	Green knocked out at 2:30 of the first round.
9	Win	9–0	Daniel Gagnon	UD	6	22/06/1982	Paul Sauvé Arena, Montreal, Quebec, Canada	60-55, 59-55, 59-54.
8	Win	8–0	Henry Rosa	KO	1	04/03/1982	Paul Sauvé Arena, Montreal, Quebec, Canada	Rosa knocked out at 1:47 of the first round.
7	Win	7–0	Ray Rosa	TKO	1	15/12/1981	Paul Sauvé Arena, Montreal, Quebec, Canada	Referee stopped the bout at 1:26 of the first round.
6	Win	6–0	Daniel Gagnon	TKO	4	03/11/1981	Paul Sauvé Arena, Montreal, Quebec, Canada	Referee stopped the bout at 1:50 of the fourth round.
5	Win	5–0	Brian Anderson	UD	4	29/09/1981	Paul Sauvé Arena, Montreal, Quebec, Canada	20-15, 20-15, 20-16.
4	Win	4–0	Eddie Ortiz	KO	2	26/06/1981	Truro, Nova Scotia, Canada	Ortiz knocked out at 0:44 of the second round.
3	Win	3–0	Denis Brisson	UD	4	14/06/1981	Paul Sauvé Arena, Montreal, Quebec, Canada	20-18, 19-18, 19-18.
2	Win	2–0	Kevin Coffey	KO	1	11/03/1981	Paul Sauvé Arena, Montreal, Quebec, Canada	Coffey knocked out at 1:32 of the first round.
1	Win	1–0	Noel Torres	KO	2	10/02/1981	Paul Sauvé Arena, Montreal, Quebec, Canada	Torres knocked out at 1:32 of the second round.

== Legal troubles ==
Hilton was found guilty in 2001 of sexually abusing his daughters when they were under 14 years old, Jeannie, born in 1981, and Anne Marie, born in 1983, between 1995 and 1998, and was sentenced to seven years in jail in a facility 110 kilometers northwest of Montreal. In May 2006, Hilton was granted parole and was freed on June 20. He made his return to the boxing ring in May 2007 and won a unanimous decision. Hilton's daughters have written a book, Le Coeur au beurre noir (The Heart with a Black Eye), describing their abuse in detail. In September 2004, a Quebec judge lifted a publication ban on the identities of the daughters so they could publish the book. An English translation is in progress.

On August 20, 2007, Hilton was arrested by police and returned to jail for breaching conditions of his release. It was reported that Hilton assaulted his wife and made threats. He was acquitted on the charges of assault and death threats but remained detained pending the decision of Commission nationale des libérations conditionnelles due to his conditional release violations.

Dave Hilton was again arrested on September 28, 2010, and charged with threats and assault, along with his brother, Jimmy Hilton.

Hilton remarried in September 2012, and had another daughter in March 2013.

== See also ==
- List of world super-middleweight boxing champions
- List of boxing families

Sporting positions
Regional boxing titles
Vacant Title last held by Stephane Ouellet	Canadian Middleweight Champion; 27 November 1998 – 2000; Vacated	Vacant Title next held by Byron Mackie
World boxing titles
Preceded by Dingaan Thobela	WBC super middleweight champion 15 December 2000 – May 2001; Sentenced to prison, stripped	Vacant Title next held by Éric Lucas
