= Alex Hilton =

Canadian boxer (1964–2026)

Personal information
- Born: 20 December 1964 LaSalle, Quebec, Canada
- Died: 7 April 2026 (aged 61) Châteauguay, Québec, Canada
- Weight: Middleweight

Boxing career

Boxing record
- Total fights: 48
- Wins: 37
- Losses: 11

Alex Stewart Hilton (20 December 1964 – 7 April 2026) was a Canadian professional boxer. He was the brother of former super middleweight world champion, Dave Hilton Jr., and light middleweight world champion of boxing, Matthew Hilton.

== Biography ==
Hilton was born in Lasalle, Quebec, on 20 December 1964. He won the vacant Canadian middleweight title at age 18 in December 1983, defeating Ralph Hollett of Halifax. He was stripped of the title by the Canadian Professional Boxing Federation in January 1985, after failing to meet a deadline to defend his championship against Michael Olajide Jr. He announced his retirement in 2004.

Described as the "enfant terrible" of his family in a 1986 Toronto Star article, Hilton was arrested several times on various charges during the mid-1980s. He received a five-year sentence in 1988 for ordering the sexual assault of another inmate while serving time for a separate offense. He later expressed regret for this period in his life, and said in a 2002 interview that he was "trying to live on the straight and narrow".

Hilton died of an apparent heart attack in Châteauguay, Quebec on 7 April 2026, at the age of 61.

== Sources ==
- Le journal de Montréal, Alex voulait règler "ses comptes"
