= Tebor Brosch =

Canadian boxer

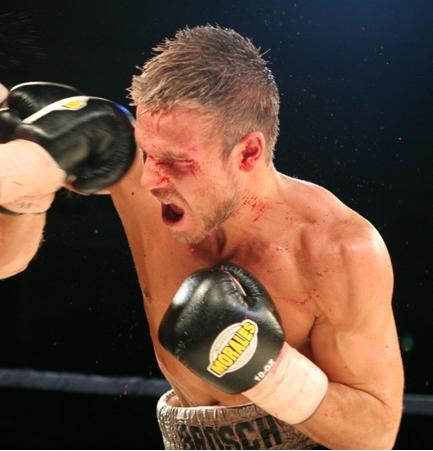
- Brosch in 2009

Personal information
- Other names: "Mighty"
- Nationality: Ukrainian-Canadian
- Born: Tebor James Brosch Jr. October 9, 1982 (age 43) Toronto, Ontario, Canada
- Height: 5 ft 8 in (173 cm)
- Weight: Light welterweight; Welterweight; Light middleweight

Boxing career
- Stance: Orthodox

Boxing record
- Total fights: 19
- Wins: 7
- Win by KO: 2
- Losses: 7
- Draws: 5

Tebor James Brosch Jr. (born October 9, 1982, in Toronto, Ontario), nicknamed "Mighty", was a Canadian professional boxer. He is the former Canadian Professional Boxing Council (CPBC) welterweight champion.

== Background ==
Brosch's first experience in combat sports was kickboxing, in which he trained extensively during his teenage years. At the age of 20, Tebor began to train exclusively in boxing. He debuted as an amateur in September 2003 at the Summer Hayes Tournament in Brantford, Ontario, winning gold as a middleweight. In October 2004, Brosch repeated his performance by again earning the Hayes tournament gold medal.

== Professional career ==
At the age of 23, Brosch made his professional debut against Codey Hanna in Winnipeg, Manitoba on January 26, 2007; Brosch dropped a unanimous decision to the 3-0 Hanna. The pair would later fight twice more, which resulted in draws for both bouts.

Tebor fought four times in 2008, losing twice to boxer Phil Boudreault and two draws to boxers Codey Hanna and Justin Fountain. He competed in another four matches the following year, winning 3 fights (2 by knockout) and one draw.

On July 13, 2010, Brosch fought for the vacant CPBC welterweight title against Justin Fountain, who he had previously faced two years prior. The match lasted for 7 rounds, with both fighters receiving cuts over both eyes. After the 7th round, the ringside doctor assessed the damage absorbed by Fountain's right eye and recommended that the contest be stopped before the 8th. Because some of the damage was delivered via an accidental clash of heads, the judges went to the scorecards for the decision.

Brosch won by technical split decision, becoming the CPBC welterweight champion. His first title defense took place February 19, 2011 against undefeated Samuel Vargas at the Paramount Fine Foods Centre, which resulted in a majority draw. On October 24, 2012, Brosch was knocked out in just 127 seconds by Ukrainian prospect Ivan Redkach.

Brosch would then fight three more times from 2013 to 2015, In 2013, Brosch fought undefeated boxer Brandon Cook for the Canadian light middleweight championship, losing by unanimous decision. He would then rematch boxer Samuel Vargas in 2014 at the Royal York Hotel in Toronto, also losing by unanimous decision.

Brosch would have his last professional fight on April 3, 2015 against boxer Steve Clagget for the Canadian welterweight title at the Deerfoot Inn & Casino in Calgary, Alberta, which he would lose by unanimous decision.

== Professional boxing record ==
| 19 fights | 7 wins | 7 losses |
|---|---|---|
| By knockout | 2 | 1 |
| By decision | 5 | 6 |
| Draws | 5 | |

| No. | Result | Record | Opponent | Type | Round, time | Date | Location | Notes |
|---|---|---|---|---|---|---|---|---|
| 19 | Loss | 7-7-5 | Steve Clagget | UD | 10 | April 3, 2015 | Deerfoot Inn & Casino, Calgary, Alberta, Canada | For Canadian welterweight title |
| 18 | Loss | 7-6-5 | Samuel Vargas | UD | 8 | April 8, 2014 | Royal York Hotel, Toronto, Ontario, Canada | |
| 17 | Loss | 7-5-5 | Brandon Cook | UD | 8 | September 14, 2013 | Casino Rama, Orillia, Ontario, Canada | For Canadian light middleweight title |
| 16 | Loss | 7-4-5 | Ivan Redkach | TKO | 1 (8), 2:07 | October 24, 2012 | Roseland Ballroom, New York City, New York, U.S. | |
| 15 | Win | 7-3-5 | Gyorgy Mizsei | SD | 6 | September 8, 2012 | Paramount Fine Foods Centre, Missisauga, Ontario, Canada | |
| 14 | Draw | 6-3-5 | Samuel Vargas | MD | 10 | February 19, 2011 | Paramount Fine Foods Centre, Missisauga, Ontario, Canada | For vacant NABA Canadian welterweight title |
| 13 | Win | 6-3-4 | Justin Fountain | TD | 7 (10), 3:00 | July 10, 2010 | Paramount Fine Foods Centre, Missisauga, Ontario, Canada | Won vacant CPBC welterweight title |
| 12 | Win | 5-3-4 | Frank Abbiw | UD | 6 | May 15, 2010 | Paramount Fine Foods Centre, Brampton, Ontario, Canada | |
| 11 | Draw | 4-3-4 | Manolis Plaitis | MD | 8 | December 11, 2009 | Bell Centre, Montreal, Quebec, Canada | |
| 10 | Win | 4-3-3 | Benyamine Besmi | KO | 2 (6), 1:31 | November 21, 2009 | Centre Claude-Robillard, Montreal, Quebec, Canada | |
| 9 | Win | 3-3-3 | Paul Watson | MD | 6 | May 30, 2009 | TD Civic Centre, Brantford, Ontario, Canada | Won vacant Ontario Boxing Council Canadian welterweight title |
| 8 | Win | 2-3-3 | Ahmad Cheikho | TKO | 1 (6), 1:47 | April 4, 2009 | Montreal Casino, Montreal, Quebec, Canada | |
| 7 | Draw | 1-3-3 | Justin Fountain | PTS | 6 | September 27, 2008 | CAA Centre, Brampton, Ontario, Canada | |
| 6 | Loss | 1-3-2 | Phil Boudreault | UD | 6 | July 19, 2008 | CAA Arena, Belleville, Ontario, Canada | |
| 5 | Draw | 1-2-2 | Codey Hanna | MD | 6 | April 1, 2008 | Royal York Hotel, Toronto, Ontario, Canada | |
| 4 | Loss | 1-2-1 | Phil Boudreault | SD | 4 | January 19, 2008 | Casino Rama, Orillia, Ontario, Canada | |
| 3 | Win | 1-1-1 | Daryl Peron | UD | 4 | October 13, 2007 | CAA Centre, Brampton, Ontario, Canada | |
| 2 | Draw | 0-1-1 | Codey Hanna | SD | 4 | April 18, 2007 | Royal York Hotel, Toronto, Ontario, Canada | |
| 1 | Loss | 0-1 | Codey Hanna | UD | 4 | January 26, 2007 | RBC Convention Centre, Winnipeg, Manitoba, Canada | |
