= Al Ford =

Canadian boxer

Personal information
- Born: August 13, 1950 (age 76) Edmonton, Alberta, Canada
- Height: 5'5
- Weight: Lightweight; Welterweight; Light Welterweight

Boxing career
- Reach: 63 in (160 cm)
- Stance: Orthodox

Boxing record
- Total fights: 74
- Wins: 55
- Win by KO: 19
- Losses: 19

Allan "Al" Ford (born August 13, 1950) is a Canadian retired professional boxer. He is a former CBF Lightweight Champion.

== Professional boxing career ==
Ford made his debut as a professional boxer on October 20, 1967 (shortly after his seventeenth birthday), a 3rd round knockout win over Joe Hogue, who was also making his professional debut. Two months later, Ford defeated Ron Lyke by first-round knockout. Ford fought an opponent with a winning record for the first time in his fifth fight, defeating 4-0 Mickey McMillan by split decision after eight rounds. Ford would win his first 37 fights, picking up the vacant Canadian lightweight title with a win against 9-1 Julie Mandell and successfully defending it several times. Ford's first truly notable win was a 10-round decision against 30-3-1 Raul Montoya on October 27, 1970.

The first loss of Ford's professional boxing career came against 24-22-5 Percy Hayles in Kingston, Jamaica in a contest for the Commonwealth (British Empire) lightweight title. Hayles outboxed Ford in a 15-round fight to take the decision. Ford would continue to fight, winning his next four bouts before back-to-back loses to Ken Buchanan (points) and Alfonso Frazer (knockout). Later Ford would lose a rematch with Percy Hayles by TKO and would finally lose his Canadian lightweight title to Johnny Summerhays in November 1975. Ford was still winning more often than he was losing, but he lost to most of his notable opponents, including to 15-4 Ralph Racine, to 15-0 Rick Folstad in 1978, and to 17-0 Aaron Pryor in 1979. Ford also fought Nick Furlano of Toronto for the Canadian junior welterweight title in 1979, losing by 14th-round knockout. Near the end, losses became more frequent, but Ford's impressive record continued to get him paydays. He would lose again to Summerhays in 1980 and drop a decision to 17-0 Ray "Boom Boom" Mancini in 1981. According to witnesses at the time, Ford was involved in a long street fight outside an Edmonton nightclub after a dispute around this time. After losing six of his last seven fights, capped by a brutal decision loss to future prospect Michael Olajide on June 17, 1982, Ford finally retired with a final record of 55–19 with 19 wins coming by knockout.

== Personal life ==
He is the father of retired mixed martial arts fighter and professional boxer Ryan Ford.

== Championships and accomplishments ==
- Alberta Sports Hall of Fame
  - Hall of Fame (Class of 2012)
- Canadian Boxing Federation
  - CBF Lightweight Championship (One time)
- Canadian Boxing Hall of Fame
  - Hall of Fame (Class of 1990)

== Professional boxing record ==
74 fights	55 wins	19 losses
By knockout	19	4
By decision	36	15

No.	Result	Record	Opponent	Type	Round, time	Date	Location	Notes
74	Loss	55–19	(Canada) Michael Olajide	UD	8	June 17, 1982	Kensington Park Arena, Vancouver, British Columbia, Canada	
73	Loss	55–18	(France) Robert Gambini	PTS	10	April 9, 1982	Marseille, France	
72	Loss	55–17	(United States) Johnny Lira	UD	10	Mar 11, 1982	Aragon Ballroom, Chicago, Illinois, United States	
71	Win	55–16	(United States) Bruce Strauss	UD	10	Feb 12, 1982	Winnipeg, Manitoba, Canada	
70	Loss	54–16	(Canada) Nick Furlano	UD	8	April 28, 1981	Paul Sauve Arena, Montreal, Quebec, Canada	
69	Loss	54–15	(United States) Ray Mancini	UD	10	April 2, 1981	Hilton Hotel, Chicago, Illinois, United States	
68	Loss	54–14	(Canada) Mario Cusson	SD	8	Feb 24, 1981	Paul Sauve Arena, Montreal, Quebec, Canada	
67	Win	54–13	(United States) Tony Taylor	SD	8	Feb 12, 1981	Edmonton, Alberta, Canada	
66	Win	53–13	(United States) Tom Crowley	UD	10	Jan 20, 1981	Winnipeg Convention Centre, Winnipeg, Manitoba, Canada	
65	Loss	52–13	(Canada) Nick Furlano	UD	10	Aug 27, 1980	Edmonton, Alberta, Canada	
64	Loss	52–12	(Canada) Johnny Summerhays	UD	8	Mar 17, 1980	Northlands Coliseum, Edmonton, Alberta, Canada	
63	Win	52–11	(Canada) Allen Clarke	SD	10	Mar 6, 1980	Winnipeg Convention Centre, Winnipeg, Manitoba, Canada	
62	Loss	51–11	(Canada) Ralph Racine	UD	8	Dec 18, 1979	Montreal Forum, Montreal, Quebec, Canada	
61	Win	51–10	(Canada) Danny Stokes	TKO	2 (10), 2:20	Dec 8, 1979	Winnipeg Convention Centre, Winnipeg, Manitoba, Canada	
60	Loss	50–10	(United States) Aaron Pryor	TKO	4 (10), 2:29	May 11, 1979	Cincinnati Gardens, Cincinnati, Ohio, United States	
59	Loss	50–9	(Canada) Nick Furlano	TKO	14 (15)	Feb 9, 1979	Winnipeg Convention Centre, Winnipeg, Manitoba, Canada	For CBF Super Lightweight Title
58	Win	50–8	(United States) Tom Tarantino	UD	10	Dec 5, 1978	Winnipeg Convention Centre, Winnipeg, Manitoba, Canada	
57	Loss	49–8	(Canada) Ralph Racine	SD	10	June 20, 1978	Winnipeg Convention Centre, Winnipeg, Manitoba, Canada	
56	Loss	49–7	(United States) Rick Folstad	SD	10	April 18, 1978	Winnipeg Convention Centre, Winnipeg, Manitoba, Canada	
55	Win	49–6	(Canada) Bob Hughes	MD	10	Feb 6, 1978	Northlands Coliseum, Edmonton, Alberta, Canada	
54	Loss	48–6	(Canada) Ralph Racine	SD	10	Nov 4, 1977	Winnipeg Convention Centre, Winnipeg, Manitoba, Canada	
53	Win	48–5	(Mexico) Octavio Amparan	PTS	10	June 23, 1977	Thompson, Manitoba, Canada	
52	Win	47–5	(Canada) Nick Furlano	SD	12	May 24, 1977	Winnipeg Convention Centre, Winnipeg, Manitoba, Canada	
51	Win	46–5	(United States) Nick Alfaro	PTS	8	Feb 27, 1977	Alsan Convention Center, Calgary, Alberta, Canada	
50	Loss	45–5	(Canada) Johnny Summerhays	UD	12	Nov 28, 1975	Edmonton, Alberta, Canada	Lost CBF Lightweight Title
49	Win	45–4	(United States) Victor De La Cruz	UD	10	Oct 20, 1975	Edmonton, Alberta, Canada	
48	Win	44–4	(United States) Roscoe Frazier	UD	10	Aug 2, 1975	Slave Lake, Alberta, Canada	
47	Win	43–4	(Canada) Jo Jo Jackson	PTS	10	July 12, 1975	Slave Lake, Alberta, Canada	
46	Loss	42–4	(Jamaica) Percy Hayles	TKO	12 (15), 1:41	Jan 22, 1973	National Stadium, Kingston, Jamaica	For Commonwealth Lightweight Title
45	Win	42–3	(Mexico) Raul Montoya	UD	10	Nov 29, 1972	Edmonton, Alberta, Canada	
44	Loss	41–3	(Panama) Alfonso Frazer	TKO	5 (10)	June 17, 1972	Panama City, Panama	
43	Loss	41–2	(United Kingdom) Ken Buchanan	PTS	10	Mar 28, 1972	Empire Pool, Wembley, United Kingdom	Welterweight Bout
42	Win	41–1	(United States) Joe Espinosa	KO	4 (10), 2:04	Mar 1, 1972	Seattle Center Arena, Seattle, Washington, United States	
41	Win	40–1	(United States) Moses Diamond	KO	1 (10)	Dec 9, 1971	New Chinatown Restaurant, Seattle, Washington, United States	
40	Win	39–1	(Mexico) Fermin Soto	PTS	10	Oct 23, 1971	Mexico City, Mexico	
39	Win	38–1	(United States) Nick Aghai	UD	10	Sep 23, 1971	Multnomah County Expo Center, Portland, Oregon, United States	
38	Loss	37–1	(Jamaica) Percy Hayles	SD	15	July 10, 1971	Kingston, Jamaica	For Commonwealth Lightweight Title
37	Win	37–0	(Canada) Leo Noel	TKO	8 (12), 0:54	May 3, 1971	Moncton, New Brunswick, Canada	Retained CBF Lightweight Title
36	Win	36–0	(United Kingdom) Willie Reilly	UD	10	Mar 22, 1971	(Canada) Edmonton Gardens, Edmonton, Alberta, United States	
35	Win	35–0	(Mexico) Juan Montoya	UD	10	Feb 25, 1971	Sports Arena, Portland, Oregon, United States	
34	Win	34–0	(Mexico) Gabriel Brambila	KO	6 (10)	Feb 13, 1971	Seattle Center Arena, Seattle, Washington, United States	
33	Win	33–0	(United States) Chi Chi Ontiveros	TKO	5 (10), 1:50	Jan 20, 1971	Edmonton, Alberta, Canada	
32	Win	32–0	(Mexico) Raul Montoya	PTS	10	Oct 27, 1970	Edmonton, Alberta, Canada	
31	Win	31–0	(Jamaica) Percy Hayles	UD	10	Sep 29, 1970	Edmonton, Alberta, Canada	
30	Win	30–0	(United States) Angel Rivera	UD	10	June 20, 1970	Edmonton, Alberta, Canada	
29	Win	29–0	(Canada) Lawrence Hafey	SD	12	May 30, 1970	New Glasgow, Nova Scotia, Canada	Retained CBF Lightweight Title
28	Win	28–0	(United States) Len Kesey	SD	10	May 13, 1970	Sales Pavilion, Edmonton, Alberta, Canada	
27	Win	27–0	(Canada) Luis Baez	UD	10	April 8, 1970	Edmonton Gardens, Edmonton, Alberta, Canada	
26	Win	26–0	(Philippines) Francisco Montemayor	TKO	9 (10)	Feb 20, 1970	Hilo Auditorium, Hilo, Hawaii, United States	
25	Win	25–0	(Philippines) Flash Gallego	UD	10	Feb 11, 1970	Hawaii International Center, Honolulu, Hawaii, United States	
24	Win	24–0	(Mexico) Fermin Soto	PTS	10	Jan 13, 1970	Hawaii International Center, Honolulu, Hawaii, United States	
23	Win	23–0	(Mexico) Jose Luis Castillo	KO	2 (10)	Dec 4, 1969	Honolulu, Hawaii, United States	
22	Win	22–0	(Nigeria) Ray Adigun	UD	10	Nov 19, 1969	Honolulu, Hawaii, United States	
21	Win	21–0	(United States) Rene Macias	UD	10	Oct 23, 1969	Sports Arena, Portland, Oregon, United States	
20	Win	20–0	(Mexico) Beto Maldonado	MD	10	Aug 29, 1969	Sales Pavilion, Edmonton, Alberta, Canada	
19	Win	19–0	(Canada) Fernand Durelle	PTS	12	Aug 17, 1969	Lethbridge, Alberta, Canada	Retained CBF Lightweight Championship
18	Win	18–0	(United States) Felix Jasso	SD	8	May 30, 1969	Sales Pavilion, Edmonton, Alberta, Canada	
17	Win	17–0	(Canada) Jean-Marie Huard	KO	2 (8), 0:54	April 17, 1969	Edmonton, Alberta, Canada	
16	Win	16–0	(United States) Bobby Brooks	UD	8	Feb 19, 1969	Edmonton, Alberta, Canada	
15	Win	15–0	(United States) Ben Joseph	UD	8	Jan 31, 1969	Edmonton, Alberta, Canada	
14	Win	14–0	(United States) Dave White	TKO	5 (10), 2:10	Nov 21, 1968	Sports Arena, Portland, Oregon, United States	
13	Win	13–0	(United States) Jimmy Fields	UD	10	Nov 13, 1968	Sales Pavilion, Edmonton, Alberta, Canada	
12	Win	12–0	(Canada) Julie Mandell	UD	12	Sep 27, 1968	Edmonton, Alberta, Canada	Won CBF Lightweight Championship
11	Win	11–0	(Canada) Michel Godin	TKO	3, 1:00	June 26, 1968	Sales Pavilion, Edmonton, Alberta, Canada	
10	Win	10–0	(United States) Lee Gray	TKO	5 (8)	June 10, 1968	Portland Armory, Portland, Oregon, United States	
9	Win	9–0	(United States) Ismael Rivera	TKO	4 (8)	June 10, 1968	Portland Armory, Portland, Oregon, United States	
8	Win	8–0	(United States) Andy Anderson	UD	6	April 30, 1968	Portland Armory, Portland, Oregon, United States	
7	Win	7–0	(United States) Danny Barthuly	TKO	2 (6), 2:50	April 8, 1968	Edmonton, Alberta, Canada	
6	Win	6–0	Tony Mesi	KO	2 (4)	Mar 25, 1968	Portland Armory, Portland, Oregon, United States	
5	Win	5–0	(Canada) Mickey McMillan	SD	8	Mar 8, 1968	Sales Pavilion, Edmonton, Alberta, Canada	
4	Win	4–0	(United States) Gene Green	TKO	2 (4)	Feb 9, 1968	Sales Pavilion, Edmonton, Alberta, Canada	
3	Win	3–0	(United States) Ron Lyke	KO	1 (4)	Dec 15, 1967	Edmonton, Alberta, Canada	
2	Win	2–0	Milton Gabriel	KO	3 (4)	Nov 17, 1967	Sales Pavilion, Edmonton, Alberta, Canada	
1	Win	1–0	Joe Hogue	KO	3	Oct 20, 1967	Edmonton, Alberta, Canada	Professional boxing debut
