= Jerry Shears =

Canadian boxer (1925-2010)

Personal information
- Nationality: (Canada) Canadian
- Born: October 18, 1925 Montreal, Quebec, Canada
- Died: March 21, 2010 (aged 84) Sainte-Anne-de-Bellevue, Quebec, Canada

Boxing career

Boxing record
- Total fights: 150
- Wins: 135
- Losses: 15

Jerry Shears (October 18, 1925 – March 21, 2010), also known as Gerald Schulman, was the founder and president of the Canadian Amateur Boxing Association (CABA). He was instrumental in organizing international competitions and promoting the use of protective headgear by amateur boxers.

== Early life ==
Gerald Schulman, known as Jerry Shears, was born on October 18, 1925, in Montreal, Quebec. He was the oldest of five children and the son of former Allied Forces bantamweight boxing champion Joe Shears. Following in their father's footsteps, he and his brothers Phil, Al, and Max built the reputation of a boxing family known as the "Fighting Shears Family" in Montreal.

== Amateur boxing career ==
At 13 and 95 pounds, he discovered boxing with gloves at neighbourhood clubs.

He enlisted in the Canadian Armed Forces at 15. He was a member of the Royal Canadian Dragoons.

His competitive boxing career started in 1938. He began fighting in local exhibitions and tournaments in Montreal. Fighting under Billy Zed and University Settlement, he captured many trophies.

In May 1940, he won the 100-pound title of the Griffintown Boys Club's Juvenile Golden Gloves. The following year, he won the 108-pound novice title. When he entered the 1942 Quebec Golden Gloves championship tournament at the Mount Royal Arena, he won the 112-pound title by default as the only entrant, then entered the 118-pound open class. He claimed the 118-pound provincial Golden Glove title with a knockout of Florian Biebault. He held both the 112- and 118-pound crowns.

He secured the Military District No. 4 126-pound crown in 1943, sat out the 1944 M.D. 4 meet, and that year won the M.D. No. 3 135-pound title. His peak year came in 1945, when he won three titles, among them the Ontario featherweight crown against Arthur King at Newmarket and the Military Districts No. 2 championships.

Shears took a break from boxing in 1946.

In April 1947, he won the Quebec Golden Gloves Championships in the 135-pound open class. The Montreal Golden Glover captured the lightweight title at the Canadian Amateur Boxing Championships in Port Arthur, Ontario, in May 1947. He later fought to the finals of the Canadian Amateur Boxing Championships, an Olympic qualifier, in May 1948 and lost by decision to Eddie Haddad.

Shears fought only in exhibitions in 1949, taking five of six bouts in Hollywood, California, highlighted by a win over New York Golden Gloves champion William Redding Jr.

In 1950, he aided his former coach Billy Zed at the University Settlement and held the post of sergeant in charge of sports at the Black Watch Armoury. The Jewish Montrealer was selected to represent Canada at the 1950 Maccabiah Games in Tel Aviv.

After a five-round fight at the Oxford YMCA in London, England, in 1950, he announced his retirement from competitive ring combat.

Shears never turned professional. He only lost 15 of his 150 amateur bouts over a 12-year period. He fought at the Montreal Forum, Maple Leaf Gardens, and throughout the United States.

== Career ==
Shears entered the insurance industry as a broker after leaving the army in 1950. He prospered, operating offices on Sherbrooke St. W.

In 1969, Shears founded the Canadian Amateur Boxing Association and served as the organization's first president. Throughout the 1970s, he acquired an international reputation when he spearheaded the drive to produce a safer sport and his efforts on AIBA's safety commission were rewarded in 1988 when the International Olympic Committee mandated headgear at the Olympics for the first time.

He was the executive vice president of the organizing committee for the 1981 World Cup Boxing Championships at Montreal's Maurice Richard Arena.

== Death ==
Jerry Shears died in Ste. Anne's Hospital on March 21, 2010, in Sainte-Anne-de-Bellevue, Quebec, Canada.

== Honors and awards ==
- 1976 Canadian Olympic Hall of Fame inductee (builder)
- 1977 Canada's Sports Hall of Fame inductee
- Canadian Boxing Hall of Fame inductee
- 1992 Canadian Armed Forces Sports Hall of Fame inductee
- 2000 Boxing Canada Hall of Fame inductee
