= Boxing at the 1972 Summer Olympics – Heavyweight =

Olympic boxing tournament

Heavyweight boxing at the Games of the XX Olympiad
- Venue: Boxing Hall, Munich
- Dates: 3 – 10 September 1972
- Competitors: 14 from 14 nations

Medalists
1st place, gold medalist(s)		Teófilo Stevenson	Cuba
2nd place, silver medalist(s)		Ion Alexe	Romania
3rd place, bronze medalist(s)		Peter Hussing	West Germany
3rd place, bronze medalist(s)		Hasse Thomsén	Sweden

The men's heavyweight event was part of the boxing programme at the 1972 Summer Olympics. The weight class allowed boxers of more than 81 kilograms to compete. The competition was held from 3 to 10 September 1972. 14 boxers from 14 nations competed.

== Medalists ==
Gold	Teófilo Stevenson; Cuba
Silver	Ion Alexe; Romania
Bronze	Peter Hussing; West Germany
Bronze	Hasse Thomsén; Sweden

== Results ==
The following boxers took part in the event:

Rank	Name	Country
1	Teófilo Stevenson	Cuba
2	Ion Alexe	Romania
3T	Peter Hussing	West Germany
3T	Hasse Thomsén	Sweden
5T	Oscar Ludeña	Peru
5T	Duane Bobick	United States
5T	Jürgen Fanghänel	East Germany
5T	Carroll Morgan	Canada
9T	Ludwik Denderys	Poland
9T	Yuri Nesterov	Soviet Union
9T	József Réder	Hungary
9T	Atanas Sapundzhiev	Bulgaria
9T	Fatai Ayinla-Adekunle	Nigeria
9T	Jean Bassomben	Cameroon

=== First round ===
- Teófilo Stevenson (CUB) def. Ludwik Denderys (POL), TKO-1
- Duane Bobick (USA) def. Yuri Nesterov (URS), 5:0
- Ion Alexe (ROU) def. Jozsef Reder (HUN), 5:0
- Jürgen Fanghänel (GDR) def. Atanas Suvandzhiev (BUL), KO-1
- Carroll Morgan (CAN) def. Fatai Ayinla (NGR), 3:2
- Hasse Thomsén (SWE) def. Jean Bassomben (CMR), 4:1

=== Quarterfinals ===
- Peter Hussing (FRG) def. Oscar Ludeña (PER), KO-1
- Teófilo Stevenson (CUB) def. Duane Bobick (USA), TKO-3
- Ion Alexe (ROU) def. Jürgen Fanghänel (GDR), 5:0
- Hasse Thomsén (SWE) def. Carroll Morgan (CAN), KO-3

=== Semifinals ===
- Teófilo Stevenson (CUB) def. Peter Hussing (FRG), TKO-2
- Ion Alexe (ROU) def. Hasse Thomsén (SWE), 5:0

=== Final ===
- Teófilo Stevenson (CUB) def. Ion Alexe (ROU), walk-over
