= Boxing in Canada =

The sport of boxing has been practised in Canada since before Canadian Confederation in 1867. Boxing was illegal in Canada during the bare-knuckle era but fights took place in remote areas and the last of them was in Halifax, Nova Scotia in 1901.

Tommy Burns from Normanby Township near Hanover, Ontario, was the first Canadian to win the world heavyweight title, becoming the champion in 1906 and defending the title thirteen times until he was defeated via Referee's decision by Jack Johnson on Boxing Day December 26, 1908 at Rushcutters Bay, Sydney NSW Australia. On May 10, 2014, Bermane Stiverne won the vacant WBC World Heavyweight Championship after a sixth-round knockout of Chris Arreola.

== Governing bodies ==
There is currently a debate in Canadian boxing circles regarding the oldest active professional championship sanctioning body. The National Championship of Canada (NCC) claims to be the legitimate continuation of the Canadian Boxing Federation (CBF) title, which was dissolved to avoid any conflict with the organization's goals regarding safety and regulation. The CBF title dates back to 1925. The Canadian Professional Boxing Council (CPBC) also claims to be the oldest active sanctioning body in Canada, tracing its history back to 1976. The CPBC rejects the NCC's claim to the CBF's history. As of 2016, the CPBC is the more active of the two bodies, while a certain degree of prestige continues to surround the NCC title thanks to champions like Brandon Cook, Sylvera Louis, and Dillon Carman.

Boxing Canada is the national governing body for the sport of boxing in Canada recognized by the Canadian Olympic Committee.

- National Championship of Canada (formerly the Canadian Boxing Federation)
- NABA Canada - a title offered by the North American Boxing Association
- Canadian Professional Boxing Council (CPBC)
- National Boxing Authority (NBA) - ranking and sanctioning Canadian professional boxing since 2012
- Canadian Amateur Boxing Association (CABA) - the official governing body for amateur boxing in Canada
- WBC Amateur Boxing Canada - an alternative body governing amateur boxing in Canada

== Notable boxers ==
Boxer	Notes
Trevor Berbick	held the Canadian heavyweight championship for much of the 1980s and briefly held the WBC heavyweight championship in 1986 before losing the belt to a young Mike Tyson; he was also the last man to fight Muhammad Ali, winning a 10-round unanimous decision
Lou Brouillard	held the world welterweight title and a version of the world middleweight title in the early 1930s; BoxRec ranks him as the 14th best middleweight of all-time and the 3rd best Canadian boxer ever
Tommy Burns	the first Canadian to win the world heavyweight title; famously would fight anyone of any race or ethnicity
George Chuvalo	top-rank heavyweight fighter in the 1950s to 1970s with a legendary chin, having never been knocked down or knocked out in 93 pro fights against other boxing greats such as Muhammad Ali, Joe Frazier and George Foreman; also a five-time Canadian heavyweight champion and participant in Ring Magazine's "Fight of the Year" in 1965 against Floyd Patterson
Jack Delaney	held light heavyweight boxing championship of the world in the 1920s and was a contender for the heavyweight title
George Dixon	the first black world boxing champion in any weight class, while also being the first ever Canadian-born boxing champion; considered the #1 featherweight of all time by Ring Magazine founder Nat Fleischer
David Downey	is in the Canadian Boxing Hall of Fame and the Nova Scotia Sports Hall of Fame
Joe Eng	first Chinese-Canadian boxer who hailed from Vancouver in the early 1930s and fought 18 times losing only three decisions.
Al Ford	Former CBF Lightweight Champion and is in the Canadian Boxing Hall of Fame and the Alberta Sports Hall of Fame
Ryan Ford	Former UBO World Light Heavyweight Champion, WBC International Silver Light Heavyweight Champion and son of retired boxer Al Ford
Arturo Gatti	top-rank featherweight, lightweight, and welterweight fighter from the 1990s to 2000s who became famous for his trilogy against Micky Ward, held multiple championships from the IBF & WBC, and participated in Ring Magazine's "Fight of the Year" a total of four times (1997, 1998, 2002, and 2003)
Sam Langford	considered one of the greatest punchers of all time, he won the World Colored Heavyweight Championship a record five-times; BoxRec ranks him as the 4th greatest heavyweight of all time, the 9th greatest pound-for-pound fighter of all-time and the greatest Canadian boxer of all-time
Lennox Lewis	represented Canada at the 1986 Commonwealth Games and 1987 Pan American Games winning a Gold and Silver medal, respectively, both in the super heavyweight category; went on to win Gold for Canada in the 1988 Summer Olympics, defeating future heavyweight champion Riddick Bowe in the finals; later turned professional and became the undisputed world heavyweight champion (WBC/IBF/WBA/IBO/The Ring) in the late 1990s; he is also the only man to score a TKO against former champion Vitali Klitschko
Jimmy McLarnin	a two-time welterweight world champion in the 1930s; participated in Ring Magazine's "Fight of the Year" in 1934
Jean Pascal	Former lineal, The Ring and WBC light-heavyweight champion with notable victories over Chad Dawson, Adrian Diaconu and Lucian Bute. Pascal has fought champions Carl Froch and Bernard Hopkins (twice). Represented Canada at the 2004 Athens Olympics.
Donovan Ruddock	promising heavyweight in the 1980s & 1990s who held both the WBA Inter-Continental & Canadian heavyweight titles; well known for his battles with Mike Tyson who he fought twice in 1991
Adonis Stevenson	Current WBC and The Ring light heavyweight champion; won a Silver medal for Canada in the 2006 Commonwealth Games
Bermane Stiverne	Most recent former WBC heavyweight champion (2014–2015)
Samuel Vargas	Current WBA-NABA Welterweight Champion and former NCC Welterweight Champion

== Venues ==
Venue	City	Est.
Genesis Centre	Calgary, Alberta	2012–present
Shaw Conference Centre	Edmonton, Alberta	1980s–present
Dartmouth Sportsplex	Dartmouth, Nova Scotia	1980s–present
Halifax Forum	Halifax, Nova Scotia	1920s–present
Halifax Metro Centre	Halifax, Nova Scotia	1970s–present
Kitchener Memorial Auditorium Complex	Kitchener, Ontario	1950s–present
Hershey Centre	Mississauga, Ontario	2000s–present
Corona Theatre	Montreal, Quebec	1910s–present
Montreal Forum	Montreal, Quebec	1920s–1990s
Delorimier Stadium	Montreal, Quebec	1920s–1960s
Centre Pierre Charbonneau	Montreal, Quebec	1950s–present
Paul Sauvé Arena	Montreal, Quebec	1960s–1990s
Casino de Montréal	Montreal, Quebec	1990s–present
Uniprix Stadium	Montreal, Quebec	1990s–present
Bell Centre	Montreal, Quebec	1990s–present
Montreal Olympic Stadium	Montreal, Quebec	1970s–present
Niagara Fallsview Casino Resort	Niagara Falls, Ontario	2000s–present
Carnegie Centennial Centre	Toronto, Ontario	1960s–present
Colisée Pepsi	Quebec City, Quebec	1940s–present
Casino Rama	Rama, Ontario	1990s–present
Regina Exhibition Stadium	Regina, Saskatchewan	1920s–1970s
SaskTel Centre	Saskatoon, Saskatchewan	1980s–present
Arena Gardens	Toronto, Ontario	1910s–1930s
Maple Leaf Gardens	Toronto, Ontario	1930s–1990s
Ricoh Coliseum	Toronto, Ontario	1920s–present
Varsity Arena	Toronto, Ontario	1920s–present
St. Lawrence Market	Toronto, Ontario	1950s–1970s
Pacific Coliseum	Vancouver, British Columbia	1960s–present
Caesars Windsor	Windsor, Ontario	1990s–present
Windsor Arena	Windsor, Ontario	1920s–present
Winnipeg Arena	Winnipeg, Manitoba	1950s to 2000s
