= Phil Boudreault =

Canadian boxer and outlaw biker (1975–2026)

- Born: Phillip Boudreault; January 23, 1975; Sudbury, Ontario, Canada
- Died: January 20, 2026 (aged 50)
- Other name: "Crazy"
- Occupations: Boxer; outlaw biker
- Allegiance: Satan's Choice MC (–2000); Hells Angels MC (2000–2026)
- Boxing career
- Nickname: "The Sudbury Sensation"
- Weight: Super welterweight
- Stance: Orthodox

Boxing record
- Total fights: 6
- Wins: 5
- Losses: 1

Phillip Boudreault (January 23, 1975 – January 20, 2026), nicknamed "Crazy", was a Canadian boxer, outlaw biker and member of the Ontario Nomads chapter of the Hells Angels Motorcycle Club.

== Background ==
Boudreault's father abandoned him as an infant, leaving him to be brought up by a single mother. Boudreault grew up in the working class town of Sudbury. As a young man, he joined the Satan's Choice Sudbury chapter led by Michel Dubé, but kept his membership a secret from the Olympic boxing officials who might have had him disqualified from boxing in the Olympics on the account of his membership in a criminal organization. Boudreault greatly admired Satan's Choice national president Bernie Guindon and his right-hand man, Lorne Campbell, saying in an interview: "They don't make men like what they used to. I wish everybody was like that". Boudreault chose as his biker name "Crazy" and had the words in capital letters "HARD" tattooed on one fist while the word "CORE" was tattooed on the other.

== Amateur career ==
Boudreault competed in the 1995 Pan American Games in Mar Del Plata, Argentina, where he lost in the quarterfinals by knockout in the first round due to a liver shot against Fernando Vargas.

He then competed at the North & Central American Olympic Qualifiers in Guaynabo, Puerto Rico in the light welterweight division (<63.5 kg). Boudreault first fought Miguel Rodriguez of Mexico in the preliminaries, beating him by a third round stoppage. He would then beat Trevor Brown of Jamaica by a second round disqualification in the quarterfinals, and Christian Saint-Jago of Curaçao by a first round knockout in the semifinals. He would then lose on points 7:1 against Luis Perez Deyne of Puerto Rico, but since his loss was in the finals, he qualified for the 1996 Olympic Games.

Boudreault competed in the light welterweight (< 63.5 kg) division at the 1996 Summer Olympics in Atlanta, Georgia, where he lost 11-9 in the Round of 16 by Russia's Eduard Zakharov after having defeated Rashi Ali Hadj Matumla of Tanzania 16-12 in the Round of 32. Although many people believed that Bouldreault should have been awarded a bronze medal and that the judges erred, He would’ve had to beat Cuba’s Héctor Vinent, the Olympic gold medalist that year, in the quarterfinal to get to the medal rounds.

His "spirited showing in Atlanta" made him into a national hero. Upon his return to Sudbury, he took part in a parade where he was greeted as a local hero, which was interrupted by the police who had an outstanding arrest warrant against him.

== Professional career ==
Boudreault made his professional debut on January 19, 2008, nearly 12 years after his last amateur fight at the 1996 Olympic Games. Boudreault beat boxer Tebor Brosch by split decision at the Casino Rama in Orillia. Three months later, he beat Eduardo Calderon, winning by unanimous decision.

He would go on to rematch Tebor Brosch, winning by unanimous decision. He would then fight Jean Charlemagne and Paul Watson on October 24 and November 21, winning both by unanimous decision.

Boudreault lost his sixth and final fight against Justin Fountain by technical knockout in the fifth round on March 20, 2009, where he suffered a torn achilles tendon, forcing him to retire.

== Professional boxing record ==
6 fights	5 wins	1 loss
By knockout	0	1
By decision	5	0

No.	Result	Record	Opponent	Type	Round, time	Date	Location	Notes
6	Loss	5-1	Justin Fountain	TKO	5 (6), 1:50	March 20, 2009	Casino Rama, Orillia, Ontario, Canada	Phil suffered a torn achilles tendon in the fifth round.
5	Win	5-0	Paul Watson	UD	6	November 21, 2008	Casino Rama, Orillia, Ontario, Canada	
4	Win	4-0	Jean Charlemagne	UD	4	October 24, 2008	Bell Centre, Montreal, Quebec, Canada	
3	Win	3-0	Tebor Brosch	UD	6	July 19, 2008	CAA Arena, Belleville, Ontario, Canada	
2	Win	2-0	Eduardo Calderon	UD	4	April 5, 2008	Casino Rama, Orillia, Ontario, Canada	
1	Win	1-0	Tebor Brosch	SD	4	January 19, 2008	Casino Rama, Orillia, Ontario, Canada	

== Hells Angels ==
After the Olympics, Boudreault continued to be involved in criminal activities and he was known to associate with motorcycle gangs. On 29 December 2000, all of the members of Satan's Choice joined the Hells Angels in a ceremony at the Angels' "mother chapter" in Sorel. As such, the Satan's Choice Sudbury chapter became a Hells Angels chapter. As a member of the Hells Angels Sudbury chapter, Boudreault was a favorite of the chapter president Lorne Campbell, whom the Hells Angels appointed to that position in 2001. Boudreault became very close to Campbell, referring to him as "Dad". Boudreault said of Campbell: "I've heard about him ever since I was an young kid. Never anything negative. Always positive, for the one-percenter side. He's just a man standing by his beliefs. He doesn't sway side to side...When I look at him, I see myself as time will pass...I always felt that he was me, just an older version of me". Boudreault also admires Campbell's unwillingness to complain about prison life despite spending much of his life behind bars as he stated: "Lorne gets his time and he never cries about it. Never bitched about it. Just did his time".

Boudreault was very protective of Campbell. At a party, someone once bumped into Campbell, leading to Boudreault to punch him out. When Campbell told him "Phil you don't have to do that", Boudreault replied "he bumped into you". At another party, Boudreault complained that another man was making sexual advances towards his girlfriend, leading him to ask Campbell: "If there's somebody I want to punch out, can I do it?" The Hells Angels have strict rules about members fighting other members, and furthermore, members are expected to ask the chapter president for permission before engaging in violence, a rule that Boudreault honored by asking Campbell for permission to strike another person. Campbell told him "sure, it's ok then" as he mistakenly thought that Boudreault was talking a non-Hells Angel attending the party when Boudreault was in fact asking for permission to strike Terry Pink, the president of the Hells Angels Simcoe County chapter. As Pink was a "full patch" member while Boudreault was only a "prospect" member, for him to assault Pink would result in his expulsion. Realizing his mistake as he saw Boudreault walk towards Pink, Campbell intervened to tell Boudreault to stop, saying that to strike Pink would lead to him being expelled. Campbell then told Pink to leave Boudreault's girlfriend alone.

In May 2002, when Campbell visited the Netherlands as part of his European grand tour, Boudreault accompanied him. Campbell described the Dutch Hells Angels whom he met as mindlessly violent men who reveled in mayhem. Boudreault was popular with the members of the Hells Angels Amsterdam chapter, who admired him for his boxing skills and swaggering aggression to such an extent that they demanded that Campbell immediately on the spot promote Boudreault up to being a "full patch" member. Campbell recalled that the Dutch Hells Angels had allowed Boudreault free drinks from the Amsterdam clubhouse bar (a privilege normally only extended to "full patch" members), saying: "They really liked him. They were treating him like he already was a ["full patch"] member". Campbell agreed and in what he called a "seedy Amsterdam motel room" handed Boudreault a biker's vest with the full Hells Angels death's head patch. Campbell recalled: "He was shocked. He reminds when I was younger. He doesn't back down from anybody. People will make money off him and his reputation without him even knowing." Bouldreault said of his promotion: "I don't care if everybody else doesn't respect me. As long as he [Campbell] respects me, I can go to bed".

On 3 March 2004, Boudreault attacked a father and son in a Valley East bar, beating both bloody with his fists. The two men attacked were Donald Lavallee and his son Jeff Lavallee. When Lavallee pere saw his son being beaten, he ran to his aid, which led Boudreault to beat him in turn. Donald Lavallee was beaten so badly by Boudreault that his jaw was broken in three places; he lost some of his teeth along with part of his jawbone; and he suffered bruised ribs. On 20 April 2004, Boudreault made a death threat to two Sudbury police officers during his bail hearing relating to his assault charges as he told the two officers: "You're dead motherfuckers! Both of you...witness protection eh? You fucking punks!" Boudreault was angry because the officers had approached with an offer of a plea bargain where in exchange for a lesser sentence, he would testify against the other Hells Angels.

In 2005, Boudreault was convicted of a brutal assault in a Sudbury bar in 2004. He narrowly avoided the dangerous offender status and a life sentence in prison after he agreed to a prison sentence of three years and accepted the lesser "long-term offender" status. On 20 March 2006, Boudreault was convicted of uttering death threats with regard to the 2004 incident in the courtroom. Boudreault was subsequently charged with violating his long-term supervision order, testing positive for marijuana and cocaine use in May 2009. He pleaded guilty in court on 28 January 2010, and was sentenced on 7 April. Starting in June 2010, he spent a year in jail.

On 26 June 2012, he was sent to prison for 30 days after he violated his Long-Term Supervision Order by associating with a man with a criminal record in March 2012. In the spring and summer of 2013, Boudreault associated with Kyle Aulenback, a man with a criminal record leading to warnings from the Crown to cease and desist. Despite the warning, Bouldreault was seen often with Aulenback between 19 October-21 November 2013, leading to him being sentenced to 90 days in jail. On 10 December 2013, he told the court that he was leaving Sudbury for good after being convicted of violating his supervision order, saying: "My wife is a schoolteacher. We're moving. We're out of here. Feb. 8, I'm free. I will pack my bags and be out of this community for good...I have overstayed my welcome, obviously".

=== Nomads ===
Boudreault became the vice president of the Hells Angels Ottawa-based Nomad chapter for Ontario, answering to the chapter president Martin Bernatchez. Nomad chapters which have no territorial limits are considered to the elite chapters of the Hells Angels with the strongest and ablest members being assigned. After a large portion of Hells Angel in Quebec were arrested on 15 April 2009 as part of Operation SharQc, the Ontario Nomad chapter became active in Quebec to make up for the members in jail awaiting trial.

On 15 October 2015, all of the charges against the Hells Angels arrested as part of Operation SharQc were dismissed following allegations that the Crown withheld evidence for too long, resulting in an internal investigation as to why the effort to convict the Hells Angels failed. Quebec Superior Court Judge James Brunton ruled that delay between the arrests in 2009 as part of Operation SharQc and 2015 violated the right to a speedy trial guaranteed by the Charter of Rights and Freedoms and dismissed all of the Operation SharQC charges against the Hells Angels. The release of the Hells Angels arrested as part of Operation SharQc caused tensions with the Ontario Nomad chapter. In particular, there were tensions between the Sherbrooke chapter of the Hells Angels vs. the Ottawa-based Nomad chapter over the control of drug territory in la belle province. At a funeral on 7 November 2015 for Lionel Deschamps, a Hells Angel who died of cancer, both Bernatchez and Boudreault stood out in being dressed in red and white in contrast to the other Hells Angels who wore the normal black vests with the death's head logo on the back.

On 16 April 2016, Boudreault suffered a punctured lung after being shot while riding his motorcycle with his girlfriend near Lachute, Quebec. The Sûreté du Québec stated that the incident was related to organized crime. Boudreault's shooting was allegedly related to a territorial dispute within the Hells Angels. Following the shooting, he was put into an induced coma after shrapnel was found near vertebrae in his spine. He was taken out of the induced coma but was unable to walk after recovery. The attempted murder against Boudreault was the first time someone had tried to kill a high-ranking Hells Angels at liberty in Quebec since the murder of Normand Hamel on 17 April 2000. In August 2016, the Nomad chapter based in Ottawa was disbanded in what was seen as a victory for the Sherbrooke chapter over the control of drug territory in Quebec.

In January 2018, the Nomad chapter in Ottawa was reestablished. Radio-Canada, citing police sources stated: "Ottawa-based Nomads chapter recently obtained a new charter from the Hells Angels, but will need to be careful not to encroach on territory ruled by Quebec Hells Angels". On 19 May 2018, Boudreault married longtime girlfriend Megan Rose at a small outdoor ceremony in Niagara Falls. In July 2018, it was revealed that Christopher Casola, a tax officer with the Canada Revenue Agency and a member of the Bacchus Motorcycle Club, had accessed Boudreault's tax records in November and December 2014.

== Death ==
On January 20, 2026, Boudreault died at the age of 50.

== Books ==
- Edwards, Peter (2013). Unrepentant The Strange and (Sometimes) Terrible Life of Lorne Campbell, Satan's Choice and Hells Angels Biker. Toronto: Vintage Canada. ISBN 9780307362575.
- Sher, Julian; Marsden, William (2003). The Road To Hell How the Biker Gangs Are Conquering Canada. Toronto: Alfred Knopf. ISBN 0-676-97598-4.
