= Pat Connolly (announcer) =

Pat Connolly (1928 - 27 November 2012) was a famous Canadian sports broadcaster. He began his journalism career in 1945 and his radio career in Sydney in 1948 with CJCB radio. In 1954, Connolly became Atlantic Canada's first television sports guest. He was also a sports reporter for The Chronicle Herald and Halifax Daily News, Sports Director for CJCH radio and later on play-by-play announcer for CFDR radio for fifteen years.

Connolly was inducted into the Nova Scotia Sports Hall of Fame in 1999. In 2009, the Pat Connolly Press Box in what was then the Halifax Metro Centre was named after him. Three years later, he died from cancer at the age of 84 in Halifax.
