= Ludwik Denderys =

Polish boxer (1944–2024)

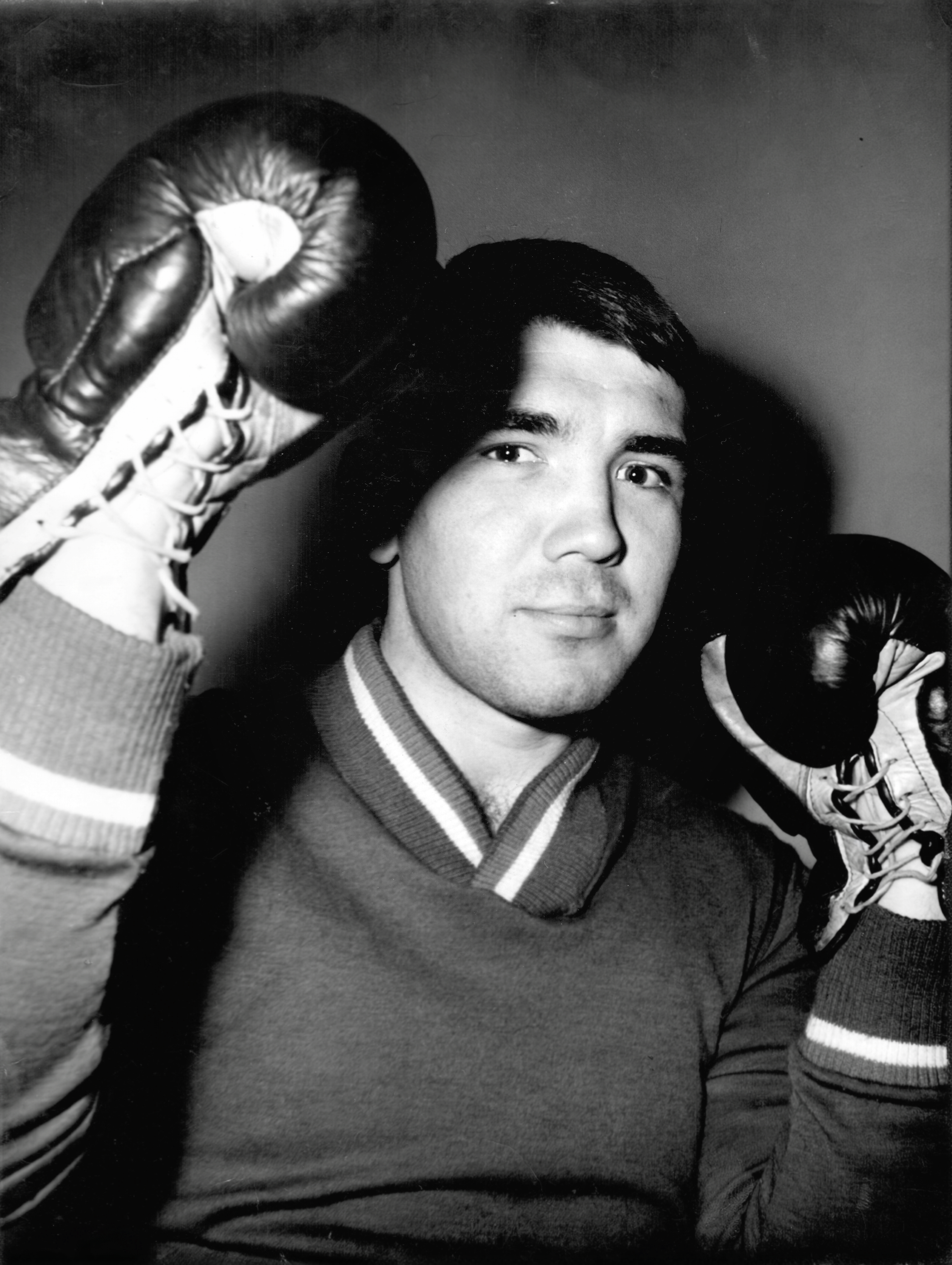

Personal information
- Nationality: Polish
- Born: 26 April 1944 Młyńsk, Gau East Prussia, Nazi Germany (now Poland)
- Died: 13 February 2024 (aged 79)

Sport
- Sport: Boxing
Medal record
Men's amateur boxing
Representing Poland
European Amateur Championships
Bronze medal – third place	1971 Madrid	Heavyweight

Ludwik Denderys (26 April 1944 – 13 February 2024) was a Polish boxer. He competed in the men's heavyweight event at the 1972 Summer Olympics but lost his opening bout to Teófilo Stevenson of Cuba. Denderys was born in what is now Western Ukraine and was affiliated with the Gwardia Wrocław boxing club. Denderys died in February 2024, at the age of 79.
