= David Downey =

Canadian boxer

Personal information
- Nickname: Dave
- Nationality: (Canada) Canadian
- Born: February 18, 1942 (age 83) Halifax, Nova Scotia
- Occupation: Boxer
- Weight: Middleweight

Boxing career

David Downey (born February 18, 1942) is a former two-time Canadian middleweight champion and a member of the Boxing Downeys dynasty. He was the son of George Downey and is the father of Olympian Ray Downey. He is in the Canadian Boxing Hall of Fame and the Nova Scotia Sports Hall of Fame.

== Early life ==
Dave Downey, the youngest of nine brothers, was born and raised in Halifax, Nova Scotia, where he also attended Joseph Howe School. Growing up, he excelled at many sports including baseball, basketball, swimming, and track and field.

== Professional boxing career ==
He began sparring at the age of fifteen after being observed on the street by Murray Langford, nephew of Sam Langford. Downey had no amateur boxing background. At fifteen years old, Downey's first pro-fight occurred in 1957 at the Halifax Forum.

In 1967, Downey won the vacant Canadian middleweight boxing title with a 12-round unanimous decision over Jimmy Meilleur in front of over 1600 hometown fans. He remained champion until facing Gary Broughton in August 1970 before regaining the title months later in a December rematch against Broughton. He retained his middleweight championship for nine more fights before losing to Lawrence Hafey in 1975.

Downey retired from boxing in 1977.

== Professional boxing record ==
31 fights	24 wins	4 losses
By knockout	16	3
By decision	8	1
Draws	2	
No contests	1	

== Honors and awards ==
- 1967 Canadian Middleweight Boxing Champion
- 1970 Two-Time Canadian Middleweight Boxing Champion
- 1976 Canadian Boxing Hall of Fame inductee
- 1999 Nova Scotia Sport Hall of Fame inductee
- 2006 Maritime Black Sports and Hockey Hall of Fame inductee
- 2018 Maritime Sport and Hockey Hall of Fame inductee

== See also ==
- Boxing in Canada
