= József Réder =

Hungarian boxer

Personal information
- Nationality: Hungarian
- Born: 5 February 1951; Tatabánya, Hungary
- Died: 19 March 2008 (aged 57)

Sport
- Sport: Boxing

József Réder (5 February 1951 – 19 March 2008) was a Hungarian boxer. He competed in the men's heavyweight event at the 1972 Summer Olympics, where he lost to Ion Alexe of Romania.
