= Oscar Ludeña =

Peruvian boxer

Personal information
- Nationality: Peruvian
- Born: 28 March 1946
- Died: 12 June 2023 (aged 77)

Sport
- Sport: Boxing

Oscar Sixto Ludeña Corzo (28 March 1946 – 12 June 2023) was a Peruvian boxer, known as "El Alacrán". He competed in the men's heavyweight event at the 1972 Summer Olympics. At the 1972 Summer Olympics, he lost to Peter Hussing of West Germany. He competed in many international tournaments, including a 1973 South American tournament where he faced Argentine boxer Jose Navarro.
