= Les Gillis =

Canadian boxer

Personal information
- Nationality: (Canada) Canadian
- Born: Les Gillis; 1940 (age 85–86) New Waterford, Nova Scotia, Canada
- Weight: Featherweight; Junior Lightweight

Boxing career

Boxing record
- Total fights: 38
- Wins: 33
- Win by KO: 9
- Losses: 4
- Draws: 1

Les Gillis is a Canadian former professional featherweight and junior lightweight boxer who won the Canadian junior lightweight boxing championship in 1966 and 1969.

== Early life ==
Les Gillis was born in New Waterford, Nova Scotia, Canada, in 1940.

== Professional career ==
Les Gillis began his pro career in Sydney, Nova Scotia, in 1959. He was a pupil of boxing trainer Tom McCluskey. Competing in the junior lightweight class, otherwise known as super featherweight, he regularly fought in Sydney, Glace Bay, and Halifax.

In his first bout with future featherweight champion Rocky MacDougall in October 1963, he dropped a points decision.

=== Taking the Canadian junior lightweight championship, January 1966 ===
After knocking out Leo Noel in 1964, he had a year off and returned to challenge for the Canadian junior lightweight boxing championship. He defeated defending champion Buddy Daye by technical knockout to capture the title in Glace Bay on January 15, 1966.

He successfully defended his title for the first time with a fourth-round knockout of Gilles "Rocky" Boulay in August 1966.

=== Loss against reigning Canadian featherweight champion Billy McGrandle, March 1967 ===
By February 1967, he was ranked second in the featherweight division after champion Billy McGrandle and number one contender Rocky MacDougall. Gillis, the 26-year-old Canadian junior lightweight champion, signed to fight Canadian featherweight champion Billy McGrandle in Edmonton for his national title. McGrandle stopped him in the 12th round on March 20, 1967.

==== Notable bouts during junior lightweight title reign ====
Bouncing back with wins over Canadian bantamweight champion Jackie Burke and Eastern Canadian junior lightweight champion Fernand Beaudin, he retained his junior lightweight title against Jo Jo Jackson in October 1967.

Gillis secured the North American junior lightweight crown in New Glasgow in November 1967, knocking out Tibby Brown.

He beat Jackie Burke in a July 1968 rematch. He also secured his first victory against future middleweight champion Lawrence Hafey in October 1968.

The junior lightweight titleholder announced his retirement from the ring at 28 in April 1969. At the time, he was operating his own fleet of taxis in New Waterford.

=== Taking the Canadian junior lightweight championship, September 1969 ===
After Gillis retired, the title was vacated, and later the Canadian Professional Boxing Federation gave its approval for his return from retirement to pursue the title. He regained his Canadian junior lightweight boxing title in September 1969 in Antigonish against Jerry MacNeil of New Glasgow.

He scored another victory over Lawrence Hafey in November 1969 and beat Rocky MacDougall in their 1970 rematch. That year, he recorded two more successful defenses of the Canadian junior lightweight boxing title against Jo Jo Jackson.

In his last fight in July 1971, he won by split decision in a non-title bout with Gary McNeil. Gillis hung up his gloves after the bout, retiring as the Canadian champion with a 33-4-1 record.

== Professional boxing record ==
39 fights	33 wins	5 losses
By knockout	9	1
By decision	24	4
Draws	1	

== Awards and recognitions ==
- 1980 Cape Breton Sports Hall of Fame inductee
- 1980 Canadian Sports Hall of Fame inductee
- 1980 Canadian Boxing Hall of Fame inductee
- 2013 New Waterford Sports Hall of Fame inductee

Achievements
Preceded by Buddy Daye	Canadian Junior Lightweight Champion; January 15, 1966 – July 1971	Succeeded by Nick Furlano
