= Ion Alexe =

Romanian boxer (born 1946)

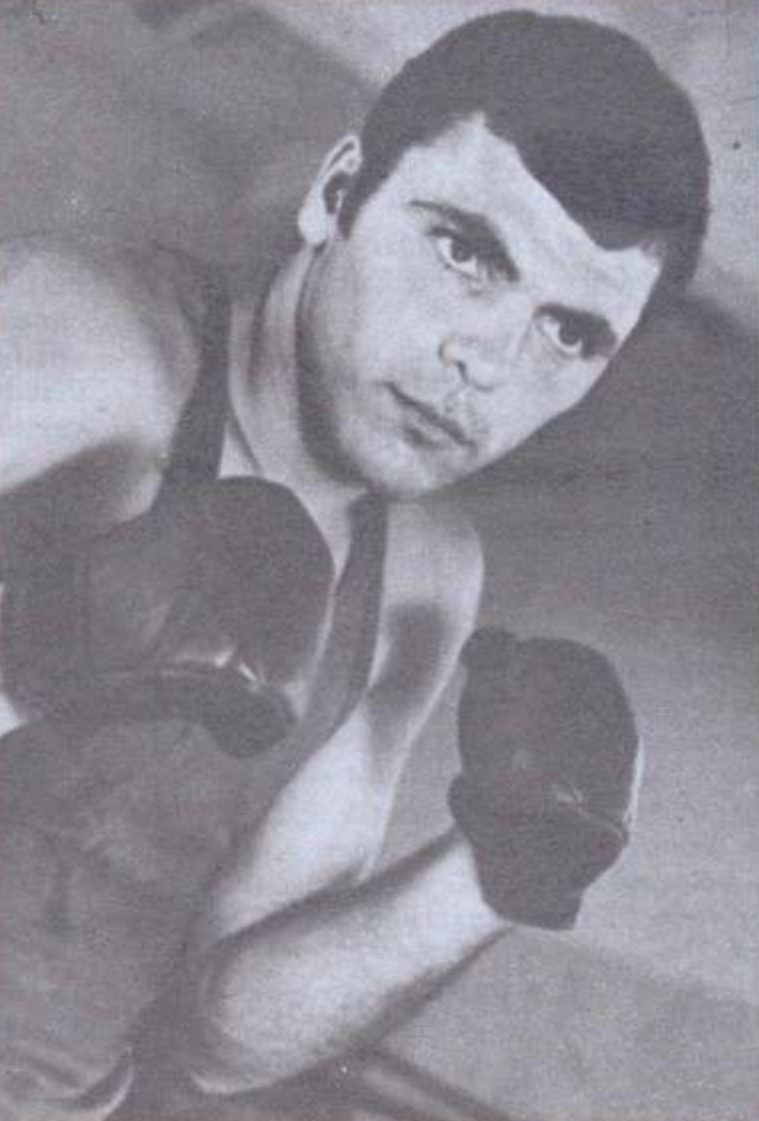
- Alexe in 1969

Personal information
- Born: 25 July 1946 (age 79) Cornu, Romania
- Height: 189 cm (6 ft 2 in)
- Weight: 81 kg (179 lb)

Sport
- Sport: Boxing
- Club: CS Dinamo București
- Coached by: Constantin Nour
Medal record
Representing Romania
Romania National Amateur Boxing Championships
Gold medal – first place	1967 Bucharest	+81 kg
Gold medal – first place	1968 Bucharest	+81 kg
Gold medal – first place	1969 Bucharest	+81 kg
Gold medal – first place	1970 Bucharest	+81 kg
Gold medal – first place	1971 Bucharest	+81 kg
Gold medal – first place	1973 Cluj	+81 kg
Silver medal – second place	1974 Bucharest	+81 kg
Silver medal – second place	1975 Bucharest	+81 kg
Olympic Games
Silver medal – second place	1972 Munich	+81 kg
European Amateur Boxing Championships
Gold medal – first place	1969 Bucharest	+81 kg
Bronze medal – third place	1973 Belgrade	+81 kg

Ion Alexe (born 25 July 1946) is a retired heavyweight boxer from Romania. He competed at the 1968 and 1972 Olympics and won a silver medal in 1972, losing to Teófilo Stevenson by walkover after he was medically disqualified to contest the final. Alexe won the European title in 1969 and placed third in 1973. Domestically he won six Romanian heavyweight titles.

== 1972 Olympic results ==
Below are the results of Ion Alexe, a Romanian heavyweight boxer who competed at the 1972 Munich Olympics:

- Round of 16: defeated József Réder (Hungary) on points, 5–0
- Quarterfinal: defeated Jürgen Fanghänel (East Germany) on points, 5–0
- Semifinal: defeated Hasse Thomsén (Sweden) on points, 5–0
- Final: lost to Teófilo Stevenson (Cuba) by walkover (was awarded silver medal)
