= Fred S. Cameron =

Canadian runner

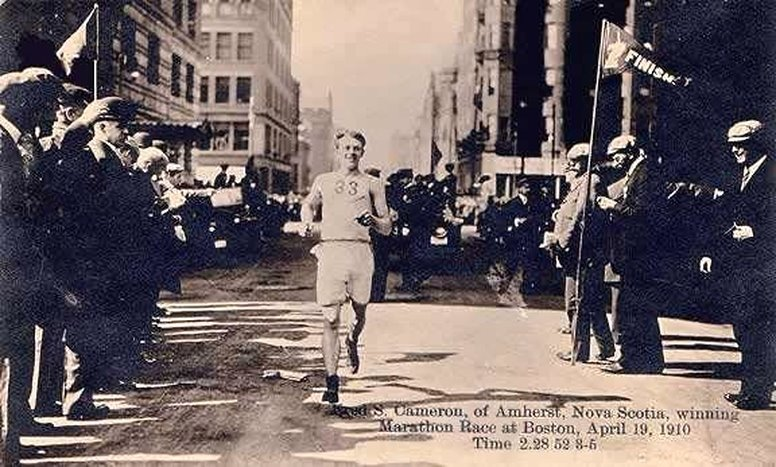
- Cameron winning the Boston Marathon

Personal information
- Nickname: Freddy
- Nationality: Canadian
- Born: November 11, 1886 Advocate Harbour, Nova Scotia
- Died: March 18, 1953 (aged 66)

Sport
- Sport: Long distance running
- Turned pro: 1911
- Retired: 1919
- Updated on 16 July 2014

Fred S. Cameron (1886–1953) was a Canadian runner from Amherst, Nova Scotia.

== Biography ==
Cameron was born at Advocate Harbour, Nova Scotia on November 11, 1886. He is best known for winning the 14th Boston Marathon in 1910 with a time of 2:28:52. Cameron defeated Clarence DeMar by one minute.

Cameron was also the North American Long Distance Champion and the Maritime five-mile champion. He held the Halifax Herald 10-mile road race record, gained over 160 trophies and awards over his career and is a member of the Nova Scotia Sports Hall of Fame.

Cameron originally began as an amateur, but began racing professionally in 1911. He retired from competition in 1919 and died in 1953.
