= Joe Shears =

English boxer (1892-1957

Personal information
- Nicknames: Little Joe, Joey Shears
- Born: c. 1892 Poland
- Died: November 25, 1957 Montreal, Quebec
- Occupation: Boxer
- Weight: Bantamweight

Boxing career

Joseph "Joe" Shears (c. 1892 – November 25, 1957), also known as Joe Shulman, was a former boxer and member of the Canadian Expeditionary Force.

== Early life ==
Born Joseph or Joe Shulman in the 1890s, he was born in Poland. When Joe Shulman was a year old, his family relocated from Poland to London, England.

== Boxing career ==
Shears was the fighting moniker of Joe Schulman, and it was later taken on by his son Jerry and the rest of the family. Shears fought in England, Canada, and the United States before the First World War.

In 1908, he defeated George Jones in the first professional boxing match conducted in Belleville, Illinois. Shears fought an eight-round fight with Canadian boxer Frankie Fleming in 1910. He later competed in a match at New Bedford's Sharpshooters Hall in 1913.

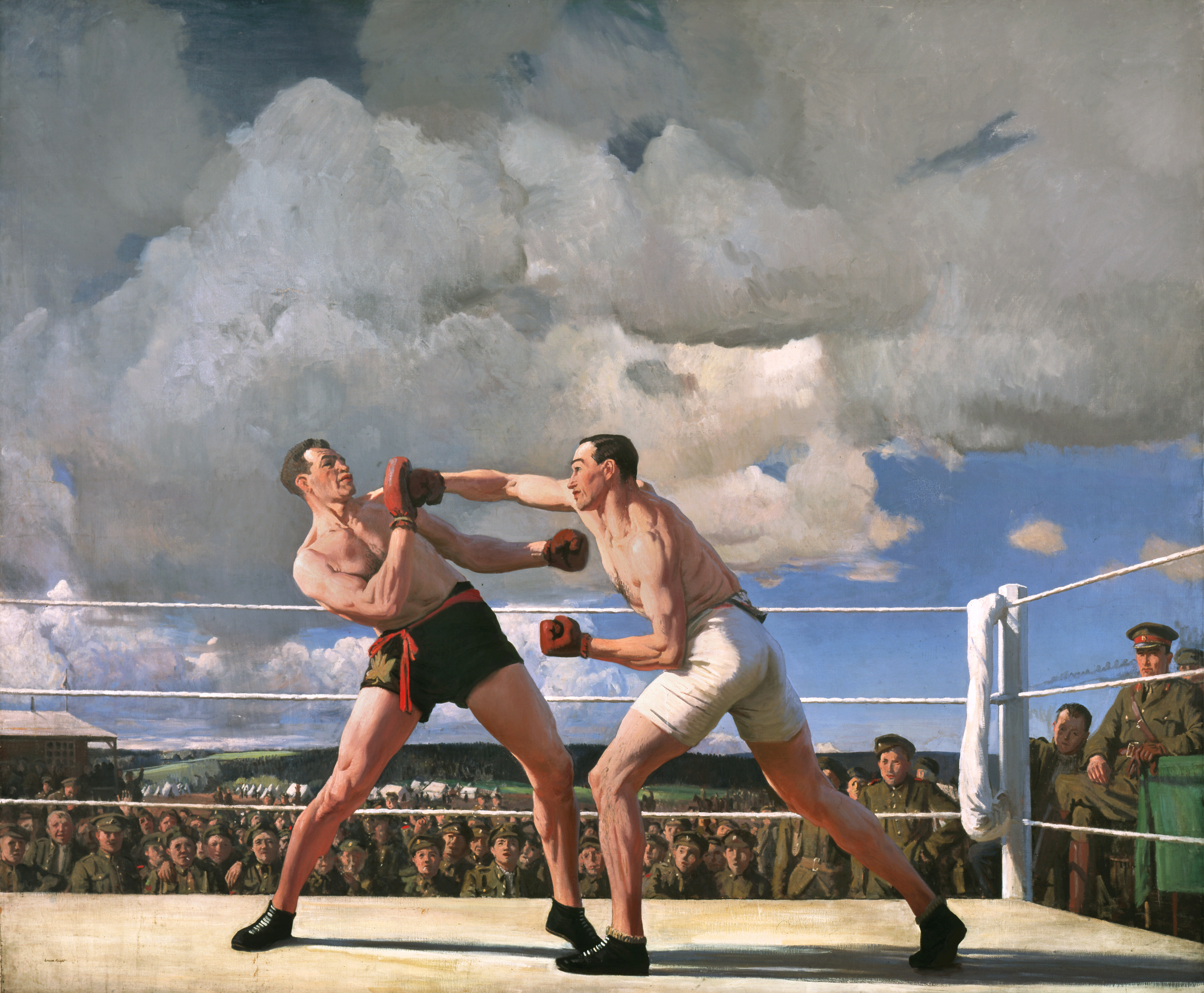
Physical Training at Witley Camp by Laura Knight.

When the First World War broke out in 1914, Shears enlisted as a member of the Canadian Expeditionary Force. After sailing to England in 1916, "Little Joe" Shears became the bantamweight champion of the Allied forces in France and England. In November 1916, English artist Laura Knight was commissioned to paint the physical training at Witley Camp in Surrey where the 156th Canadian Infantry Battalion was stationed. Joe Shears was encountered by Laura Knight outside of the camp barber's shed, where he accepted an offer to be her model. She described Shears as having a "bashed-in purple face, cauliflower ears, and a broken nose." Knight set up her easel and paints, the gym transformed into her art studio, with Shears acting as an attendant, model, and teacher. The two formed a friendship, and he regularly walked her back to the Angel Hotel in Godalming, three miles from the camp. After viewing her completed works, Joe proposed setting up a shop in Leicester Square to display and sell her drawings. Knight painted over 9 paintings which included a final large canvas, titled "Physical Training at Witley Camp" which featured the boxer. One piece illustrated Shears punching a double end bag, while another captured him training with Corporal W. Atkin in the gym.

Shears escaped a German prison camp by crawling through a sewer.

After the war, in 1919, he went back to boxing in Montreal. Weighing in at 116 pounds, the Canadian soldier defeated Young Demers in a six round bout in September 1919.

== Personal life ==
Jerry, Phil, Max, Al, and Joe Jr. were his five sons, all of whom became amateur boxers inspired by their father's example.

After stepping away from boxing, he worked as a taxi driver in Montreal. In March 1929, he joined 22 survivors from his regiment for a reunion and later escorted his friend Tom Patterson to New York before returning to Canada.

== Death ==
Joseph Shears died on November 25, 1957 in Montreal, Quebec.

== Honors and awards ==
- Allied Forces Bantamweight Champion. (1916)
