= Rick Folstad =

American boxer

Rick Folstad (born October 18, 1951) is a retired light welterweight professional boxer from Minneapolis, Minnesota.

== Professional career ==
Folstad made his professional debut on January 29, 1975, with a decision win against Robert Bo Moody. He won his first seventeen professional fights, highlighted by back-to-back wins against Bobby Rodriguez and a 10-round points win against Al Ford, whose record was 49–6 at the time. Folstad's first loss was a surprising points loss to Johnny Copeland, who was winless in his last six fights. After the loss to Copeland Folstad only fought four more times, going 3–1, and then retired with a final record of 20–2 with 7 wins by knockout.
