= Buddy Daye =

Canadian boxer (1928–1995)

Personal information
- Nickname: Buddy
- Nationality: (Canada) Canadian
- Born: Delmore William Daye; 1928 New Glasgow, Nova Scotia, Canada
- Died: August 31, 1995 (aged 66–67) Halifax, Nova Scotia, Canada
- Weight: Featherweight; Super-featherweight

Boxing career

Boxing record
- Total fights: 88
- Wins: 81
- Win by KO: 71
- Losses: 6

Delmore William "Buddy" Daye (1928 – August 31, 1995) was a Canadian former professional boxer and community activist. He won the Canadian super featherweight boxing championship in 1964.

== Early life ==
Delmore "Buddy" Daye was born in New Glasgow, Nova Scotia, Canada, in 1928. Daye moved to Halifax, Nova Scotia as a young boy and grew up on Creighton Street. He worked as a merchant mariner for a short period.

== Professional boxing career ==
Daye fought as a professional boxer between 1953 and 1966.

He defeated an unbeaten Dave Hilton Sr. in a 10-round fight in 1959, but nearly three months later, he was defeated by Hilton for the Canadian featherweight title.

On June 30, 1964, Buddy Daye won the Canadian super featherweight boxing championship against Jackie Carter at the Halifax Forum. Daye lost the title to Les Gillis on January 15, 1966.

His last boxing match was on September 10, 1966, against Leo Noel of Saint John, New Brunswick.

Daye was inducted into the Nova Scotia Sport Hall of Fame in 1981.

== Political career ==
After boxing, he graduated from the University of Guelph in 1967.

Daye was involved in community development work in Halifax's North End and was a supporter of Africville.

He ran for the Nova Scotia New Democratic Party in the electoral district of Halifax Needham in the 1967 provincial election.

At age 38 in 1971, he began a two-year term on the Council of the Company of Young Canadians, appointed by the Nova Scotia government after serving on the Halifax-Dartmouth Welfare Council and as youth director for the Halifax Neighborhood Centre.

In 1990, Daye became the first African Nova Scotian Sergeant-at-Arms for the Nova Scotia House of Assembly, where he served until 1995. His photograph was placed as a permanent memorial in the Nova Scotia House of Assembly in 1996.

== Death ==
Delmore "Buddy" Daye died from lung cancer on August 31, 1995, at 66.

== Honors and awards ==
- 1964 Canadian Super Featherweight Champion
- 1981 Nova Scotia Sport Hall of Fame inductee

In June 2006, the section of Gerrish Street between Gottingen and Maynard streets in Halifax's North End was given the new name Buddy Daye Street as a tribute to him.
