= Hasse Thomsén =

Swedish boxer

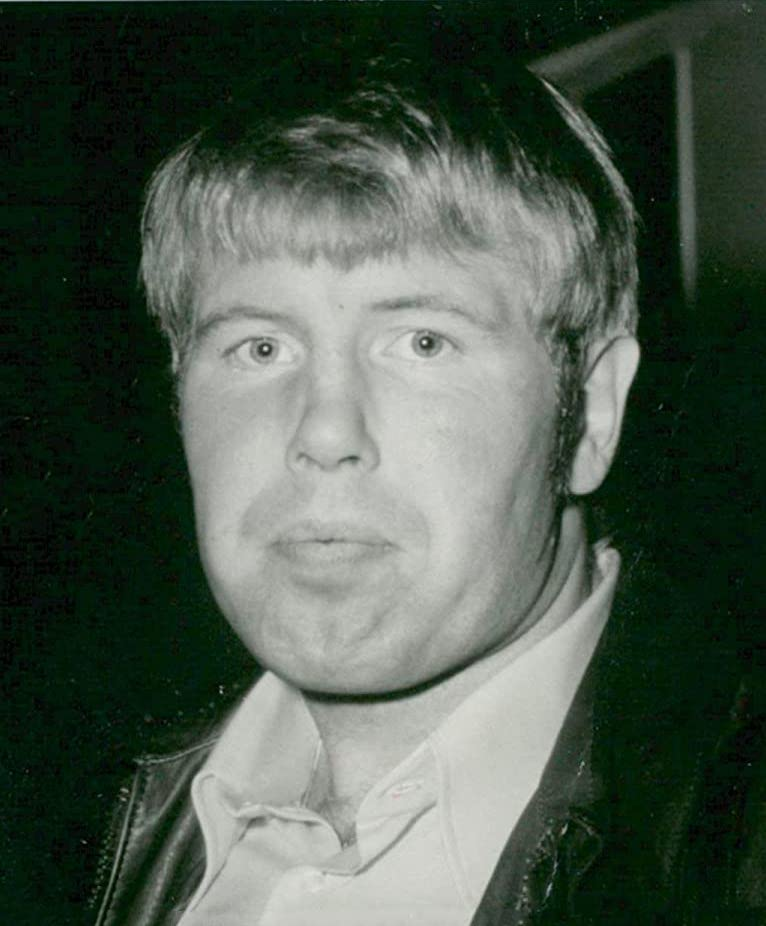
- Thomsén in 1972

Personal information
- Born: 27 February 1942 Mölndal, Sweden
- Died: 26 April 2004 (aged 62) Kungälv, Sweden

Sport
- Sport: Boxing
Medal record
Representing Sweden
Olympic Games
| Bronze medal – third place | 1972 Munich | Heavyweight |

Hasse Evert Thomsén (27 February 1942 – 26 April 2004) was a heavyweight boxer from Sweden who won a bronze medal at the 1972 Summer Olympics. In the semifinals he was defeated by Romania's eventual silver medalist Ion Alexe on points (0:5). Thomsén was a national heavyweight champion in 1969–72.

In 1973–74, Thomsén had five professional bouts in Europe with a result of one loss and 4 draws.
