= Peter Hussing =

German boxer

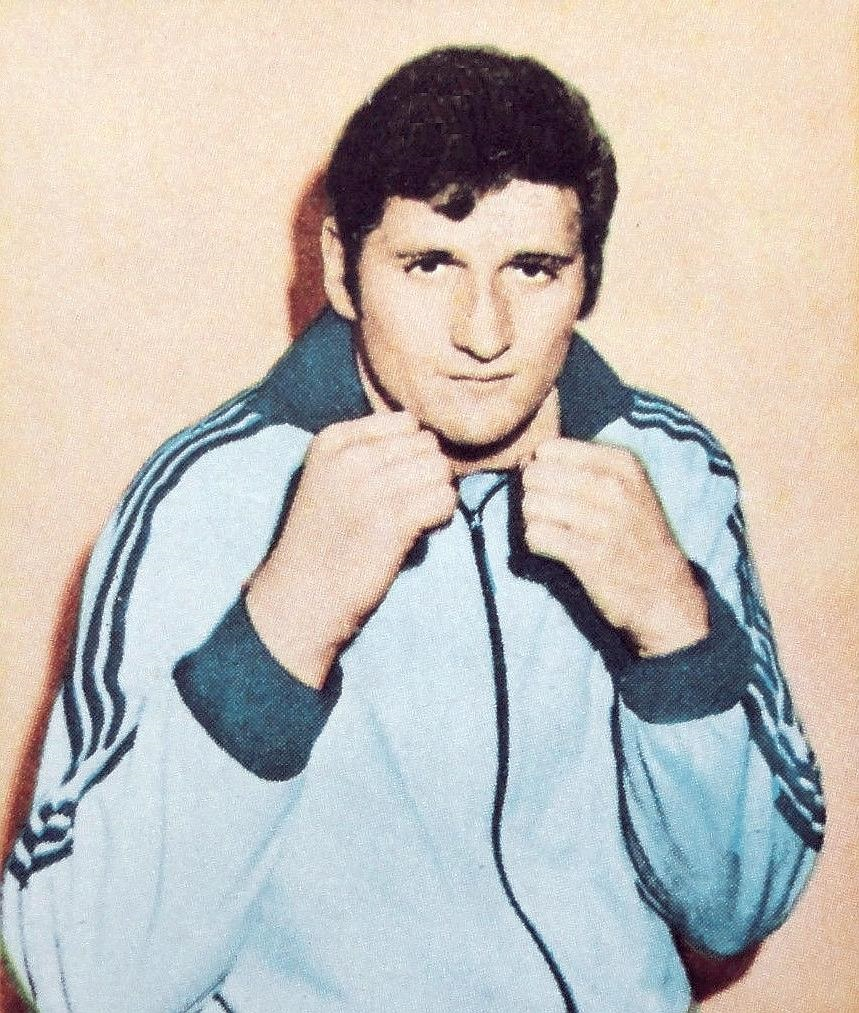

Personal information
- Born: 15 May 1948 Brachbach, Germany
- Died: 8 September 2012 (aged 64) Brachbach, Germany
- Height: 196 cm (6 ft 5 in)
- Weight: 101 kg (223 lb)

Sport
- Sport: Boxing
- Club: Bayer Leverkusen
Medal record
Representing West Germany
Olympic Games
Bronze medal – third place	1972 Munich	Heavyweight
World Amateur Championships
Bronze medal – third place	1982 Munich	Super heavyweight
European Amateur Championships
Bronze medal – third place	1969 Bucharest	Heavyweight
Silver medal – second place	1971 Madrid	Heavyweight
Silver medal – second place	1973 Belgrade	Heavyweight
Gold medal – first place	1979 Cologne	Super heavyweight

Peter Hussing (15 May 1948 – 8 September 2012) was a West German heavyweight boxer. He won a bronze medal at the 1972 Olympics and placed fifth in 1976 and 1984; he missed the 1980 Moscow Games due to their boycott by West Germany.

Hussing won four medals at the European championships in 1969–1979, missing the 1977 tournament again due to a boycott. Domestically he won a record of 16 titles in 1969–83 and 1985. He held a degree in architecture from the University of Siegen, and in retirement worked as a construction manager in his hometown of Brachbach.

== 1972 Olympic results ==
Below is the record of Peter Hussing, a West German heavyweight boxer who competed at the 1972 Munich Olympics:

- Round of 16: bye
- Quarterfinal: defeated Oscar Ludena (Peru) by a first-round knockout
- Semifinal: lost to Teofilo Stevenson (Cuba) by a second-round technical knockout

== Outside of sport ==
From 29 September 2008, Hussing was mayor of his home municipality.

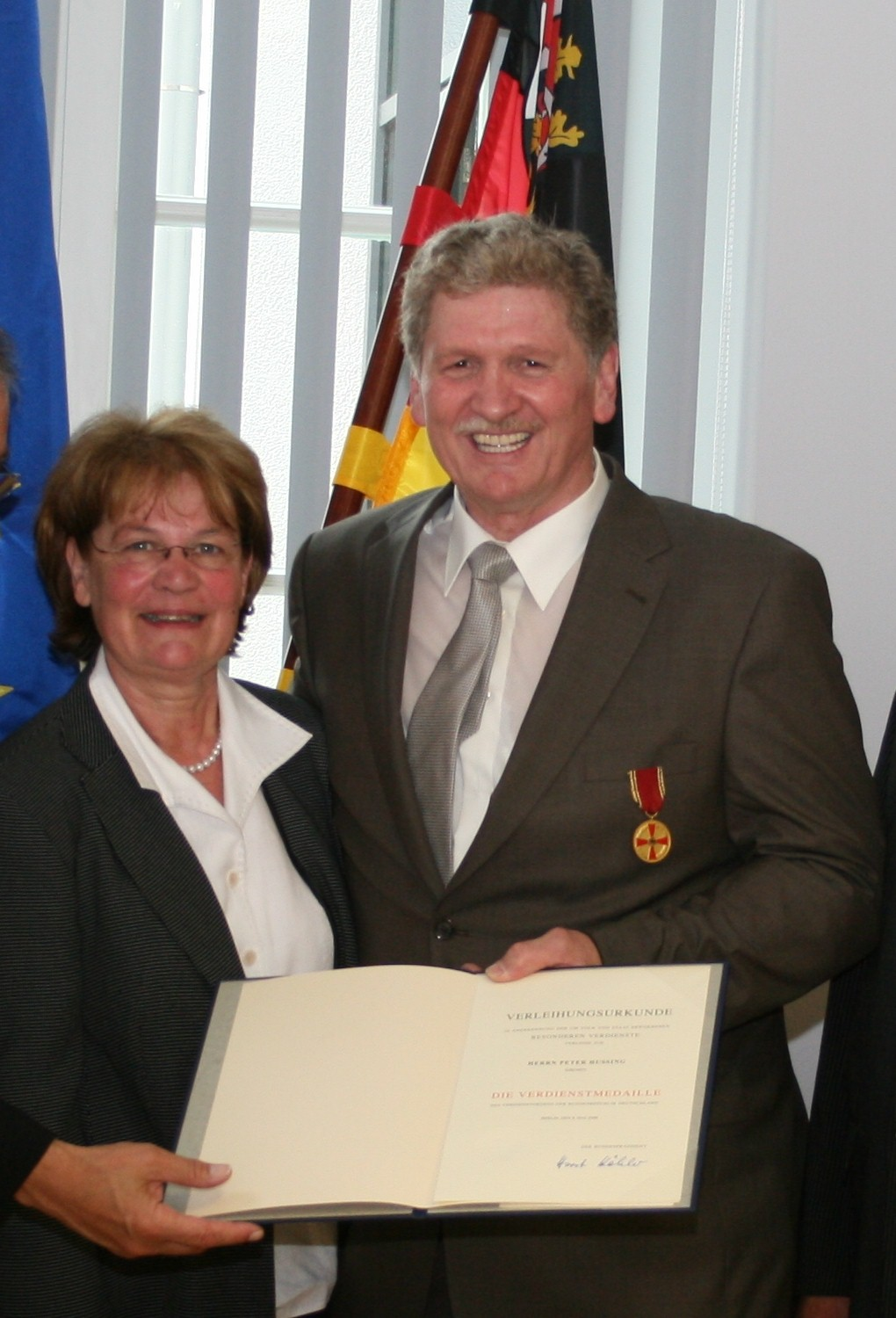
Peter Hussing at the award ceremony, Mainz (2008)

Because of his commitment to children with cancer and in recognition of his boxing career, Peter Hussing was awarded the Federal Cross of Merit in Mainz on 11 July 2008.

== Death ==
On 8 September 2012, Hussing succumbed to cancer at the age of 64 in a hospital in Siegen.
