= Antonio Ludeña =

Spanish Jesuit mathematician (1740–1820)

- Born: December 23, 1740; Almussafes
- Died: March 1, 1820 (aged 79); Cremona
- Other name: Antonio Ludenna

Antonio Ludeña (December 23, 1740 – March 1, 1820) was a Spanish Jesuit mathematician, physicist, and professor at the University of Camerino.

== Works ==
- De vera, et necessaria motus accelerati theoria (in Latin). Camerino: Vincenzo Gori. 1781.
- Dissertazione sopra il quesito (in Italian). Mantua: Erede di Alberto Pazzoni. 1788.
- Due opuscoli matematici (in Italian). Venice: Giacomo Storti. 1793.
- Vera idraulica teoria (in Italian). Vol. 1. Cremona: Fratelli Manini. 1817.
- Vera idraulica teoria (in Italian). Vol. 2. Cremona: Fratelli Manini. 1817.
- Vera idraulica teoria (in Italian). Vol. 3. Cremona: Fratelli Manini. 1818.
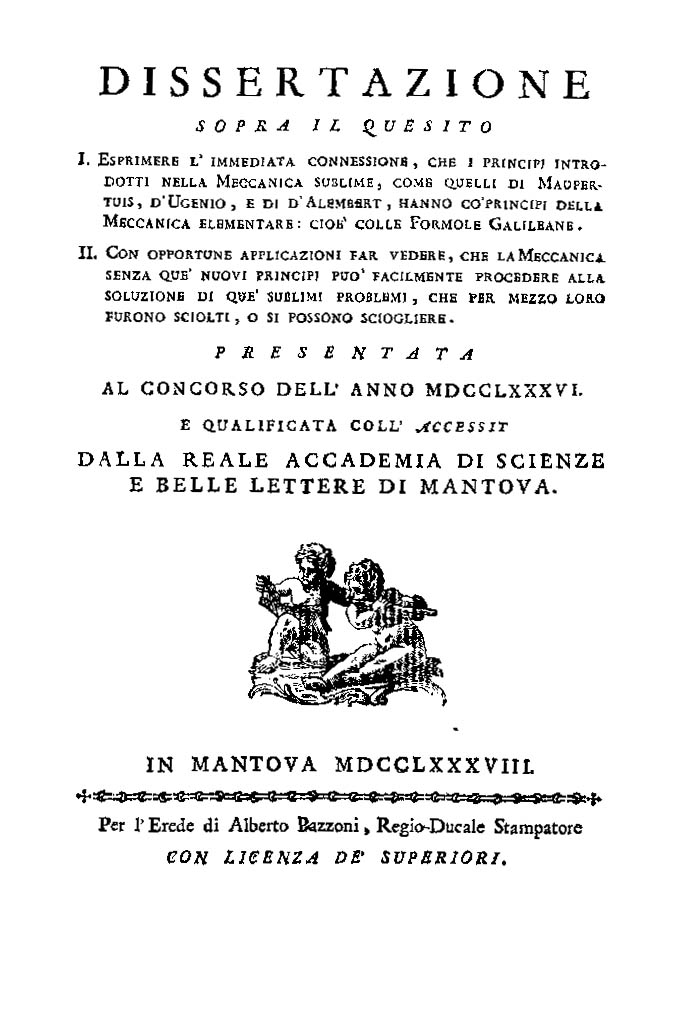
Dissertazione sopra il quesito, 1788

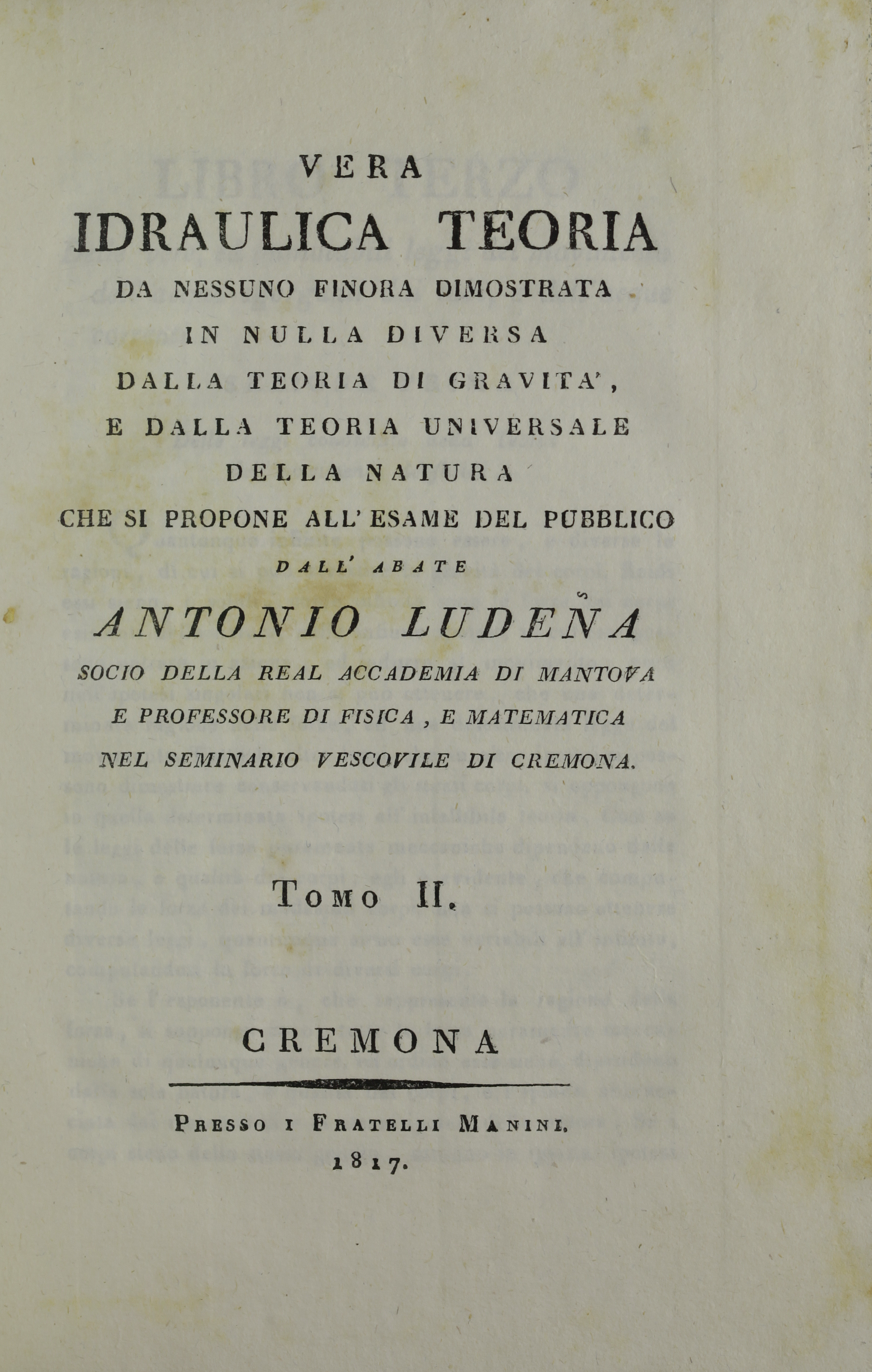
Vera idraulica teoria, 1817
