= Alain Bonnamie =

Canadian boxer (born 1965)

Personal information
- Born: 31 July 1965 (age 61) Canada
- Height: 5 ft 10 in (178 cm)
- Weight: light middle/middle/super middle/light heavyweight

Boxing career
- Reach: 66 in (168 cm)

Boxing record
- Total fights: 33
- Wins: 21
- Win by KO: 12
- Losses: 9
- Draws: 3
- No contests: 1

Alain Bonnamie (born 31 July 1965) is a Canadian professional boxer of the 1980s, '90s and 2000s who won the World Boxing Council (WBC) Continental Americas light middleweight title, World Boxing Council (WBC) International light middleweight title, and Commonwealth middleweight title, and was a challenger for the North American Boxing Federation (NABF) light middleweight title against Wayne Powell (twice), and Canada light middleweight title against Stephane Ouellet, his professional fighting weight varied from 151 3/4 lb (68.8 kg; 10 st 11.8 lb), i.e. light middleweight to 169 3/4 lb (77.0 kg; 12 st 1.8 lb), i.e. light heavyweight.

During a 1999 fight against Adrian Dodson for the Commonwealth Championship, Bonnamie was the victim of biting by Dodson which led to a dsqualfcation victory for Bonnamie. Dodson was fined £1,000 and banned for 18 months.
