= Boxing Canada =

Governing body for Olympic-style boxing in Canada

- Sport: Amateur Boxing
- Affiliation: World Boxing
- Affiliation date: 24 August 2023
- Headquarters: Montreal, Quebec, Canada
- President: Ryan O'Shea

Official website
- www.boxingcanada.org
- (Canada)

Boxing Canada is the governing body for amateur boxing in Canada. Headquartered in Montréal, Québec, Canada, it is responsible for the administration, development and promotion of Olympic-style boxing in the Canada.

== See also ==
- Association of Boxing Commissions
- Canadian Amateur Boxing Association
- Canadian Professional Boxing Council
- Canadian Olympic Committee
