= Canadian Professional Boxing Council =

Sanctioning organization for professional boxing bouts

- Abbreviation: CPBC
- Formation: 1976
- Purpose: Boxing sanctioning organization
- Region served: Canada
- Website: canadianboxingcouncil.com

The Canadian Professional Boxing Council (CPBC) is a sanctioning body for professional boxing in Canada.

== Early history ==
The Canadian Professional Boxing Council was founded in December of 1976. Vince Bagnato presided over the council. There were promoters and amateur and professional fight managers among its members.

It was established as a national regulatory body for professional boxing, presenting an alternative to the Canadian Boxing Federation. Title fights were sanctioned and Canadian boxing professionals were ranked by the CPBC. The council's first ring ratings were released on January 7, 1977. The CPBC started with ranking boxers in nine of eleven weight classes: Heavyweight, light-heavyweight, middleweight, junior middleweight, welterweight, junior welterweight, lightweight, junior lightweight, and featherweight.

In Toronto, Paul Nielson fought George Jerome in the first title fight for the Canadian Heavyweight boxing championship, and Nielson emerged victorious as the first-ever CPBC Heavyweight champion. Paul Nielsen was selected the Fighter of the Month and Clyde Gray the Fighter of the Year at the first boxing awards.

== Present day ==
The Canadian Professional Boxing Council was relaunched in 2010 by Don Collette.
