= Canadian Amateur Boxing Association =

- Formation: 1969; 56 years ago
- Headquarters: 888 Belfast Road
- Location: Ottawa, Ontario, Canada
- Founder: Jerry Shears

The Canadian Amateur Boxing Association (CABA) (French: L'association Canadienne De Boxe Ameteur) was an organization established in 1969 to govern amateur boxing competitions in Canada at the national and international level. CABA's head office was located in Ottawa, Ontario. The nationwide organization oversees over ten provincial boxing associations.

== Early history ==
The Canadian Amateur Boxing Association was established in 1969 by Jerry Shears of Montreal.

The Canadian Amateur Boxing Association held annual national amateur boxing championships. The national championships were part of the selection process for the Olympic Games. The CABA also appointed the Canadian boxing coaches for the Olympic national boxing team. In 1969, the first Canadian amateur championship bouts ever were held in St. Catharines.

On May 28, 1971, the Canadian Amateur Boxing Association's East-West Championship Tournament was held at the Kingston Memorial Centre.

The association established its first CABA training center in Halifax, Nova Scotia, in February 1982. The B.C. Training Centre, a permanent CABA training facility, opened at Willingdon Heights School in Burnaby on October 1, 1982.

== Past presidents ==
- Jerry Shears
- Jim McGuiness
- George Armson
- Dick MacLean
- Hank Summers
- Herb Embuldeniya

== See also ==
- Boxing Canada
