= Nova Scotia Sport Hall of Fame =

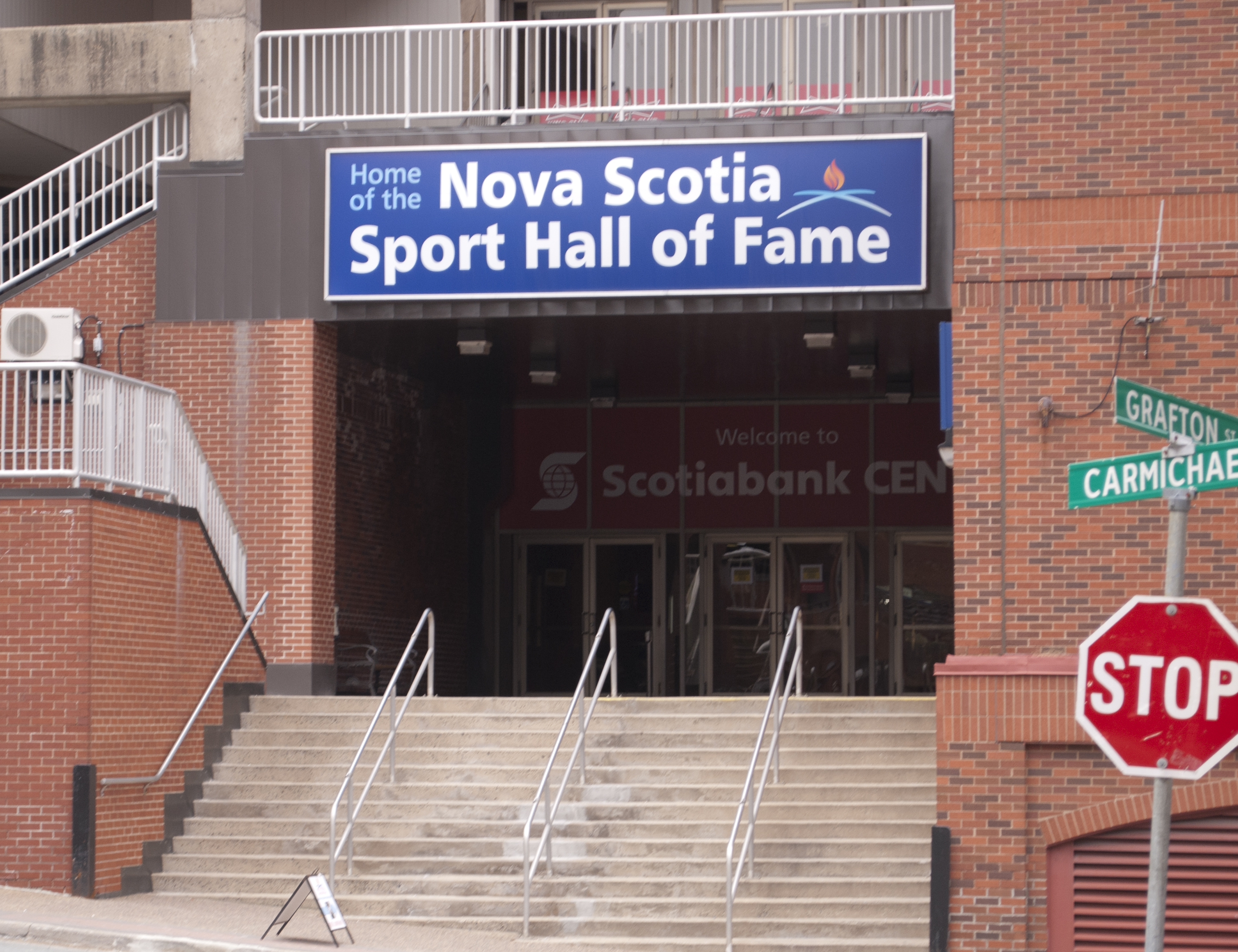
- The Nova Scotia Sport Hall of Fame in 2015
- Established: November 3, 1964; 61 years ago
- Location: Halifax, Nova Scotia, Canada
- Coordinates: 44°38′54″N 63°34′36″W
- Type: Sports hall of fame and museum
- CEO: Bruce Rainnie (President and CEO)
- Website: nsshf.com

The Nova Scotia Sport Hall of Fame (NSSHF) is a hall of fame and museum that honours athletes, teams, and builders (coaches, officials, and administrators) who have made significant contributions to sport in the Canadian province of Nova Scotia. It was founded in 1964 by John E. Ahern, a former mayor of Halifax, and has since inducted more than 550 athletes, builders, and teams.

The Hall operated a free-admission physical museum in downtown Halifax for most of its history, most recently adjacent to the Scotiabank Centre, but it closed that location in 2020 amid a rent dispute with its landlord during the COVID-19 pandemic. The Hall continues to operate as a registered charity, maintaining its collection and inductee database online and holding an annual induction ceremony in Halifax, while pursuing a rebuild of a physical facility.

== Inductees ==
The Hall of Fame inducts individuals in the categories of athlete and builder, and separately recognizes teams; since 2018 it has also permitted the induction of animals. Inductees are chosen annually by the Hall's board following nominations from the public, with a ceremony typically held in the fall in Halifax.

The table below lists a selection of notable inductees. It is not a complete list; the Hall's full inductee database is searchable on its website.

Year Inducted	Name	Inductee Type	Sport
1982	John E. "Gee" Ahern	Builder	Multi-sport
2003	Ricky Anderson	Athlete	Boxing
2006	Terry Baker	Athlete	Football
Original	Marty Barry	Athlete	Hockey
Original	Freddie Cameron	Athlete	Track & Field
1984	Lyle Carter	Athlete	Multi-sport
1999	Pat Connolly	Builder	Sport Media
1993	James Creighton	Builder	Hockey
1981	Delmore William "Buddy" Daye	Athlete	Boxing
Original	George Dixon	Athlete	Boxing
1994	Ann Dodge	Athlete	Canoeing
1980	Hanson Dowell	Builder	Hockey
1982	Norman "Normie" Ferguson	Athlete	Hockey
2012	Steve Giles	Athlete	Canoeing
2012	Vince Horsman	Athlete	Baseball
Original	Sam Langford	Athlete	Boxing
1981	Donald John Loney	Builder	Football
Original	Ronald MacDonald	Athlete	Track & Field
2008	Allan MacInnis	Athlete	Hockey
1980	Allister MacNeil	Athlete	Hockey
1980	Stanley "Chook" Maxwell	Athlete	Baseball
Original	Aileen Meagher	Athlete	Track & Field
1999	Mike McPhee	Athlete	Hockey
Original	Johnny Miles	Athlete	Track & Field
2008	Carroll Morgan	Athlete	Boxing
1991	Billy O'Donnell	Athlete	Harness Racing
2008	Arnold Patterson	Builder	Sport Media
2018	Somebeachsomewhere	Athlete	Harness Racing
2004	Tyrone Williams	Athlete	Football
