= Paul Sauvé Arena =

Indoor arena located in Montreal, Quebec

Coordinates: 45°33′43″N 73°34′46″W

The Paul Sauvé Arena was an indoor arena located at 4000 rue Beaubien Est in Montreal, Quebec, in its Rosemont district. Built in 1960 and demolished in 1992–93, the arena had a capacity of 4,000 people. It was named after Paul Sauvé (March 24, 1907 – January 2, 1960), a Quebec Premier with the Union Nationale.

The arena hosted some of the most important events in modern Quebec political history. It was the site of the Parti Québécois election victory celebrations on November 15, 1976, and on April 13, 1981. Additionally, it was the site of two of the most important moments of the 1980 referendum. On May 14, 1980 Pierre Trudeau delivered his "first among equals" speech that was his major contribution to the campaign battle, and René Lévesque delivered his passionate concession speech on May 20, 1980.

The Paul Sauvé Arena was, most popularly, the home to Quebec professional wrestling. In the mid-1960s, Johnny Rougeau and partner Bob Langevin created "Les As de la Lutte" (Wrestling Aces, known in English as All-Star Wrestling) and made the arena its main venue for wrestling shows, which ran from 1965 to 1975; its successor, Lutte Internationale, also used the arena as its home base for regular cards from 1980 until it folded in 1987 due to competition from the WWF. The arena was also home to a founding franchise in the Quebec Major Junior Hockey League. The Rosemont National played two seasons (from 1969 to 1971, finishing 8th and 9th) before moving to Laval. In the late 1960s the Montreal Canadiens lacrosse team played in the arena, and rock concerts including those performed by Jimi Hendrix, Cream, [[Soft Machine]], and Eric Burdon and The Animals. Finally, boxing was always a big draw, and the arena saw many memorable fights.

It also hosted preliminary volleyball matches at the 1976 Summer Olympics. Before decay, costs and low attendances doomed the arena, it was used for curling hall, and later a bingo hall, a gymnasium, a bowling alley, and trade shows.
