= Fencing at the 1972 Summer Olympics – Men's épée =

Olympic fencing event

Men's épée at the Games of the XX Olympiad
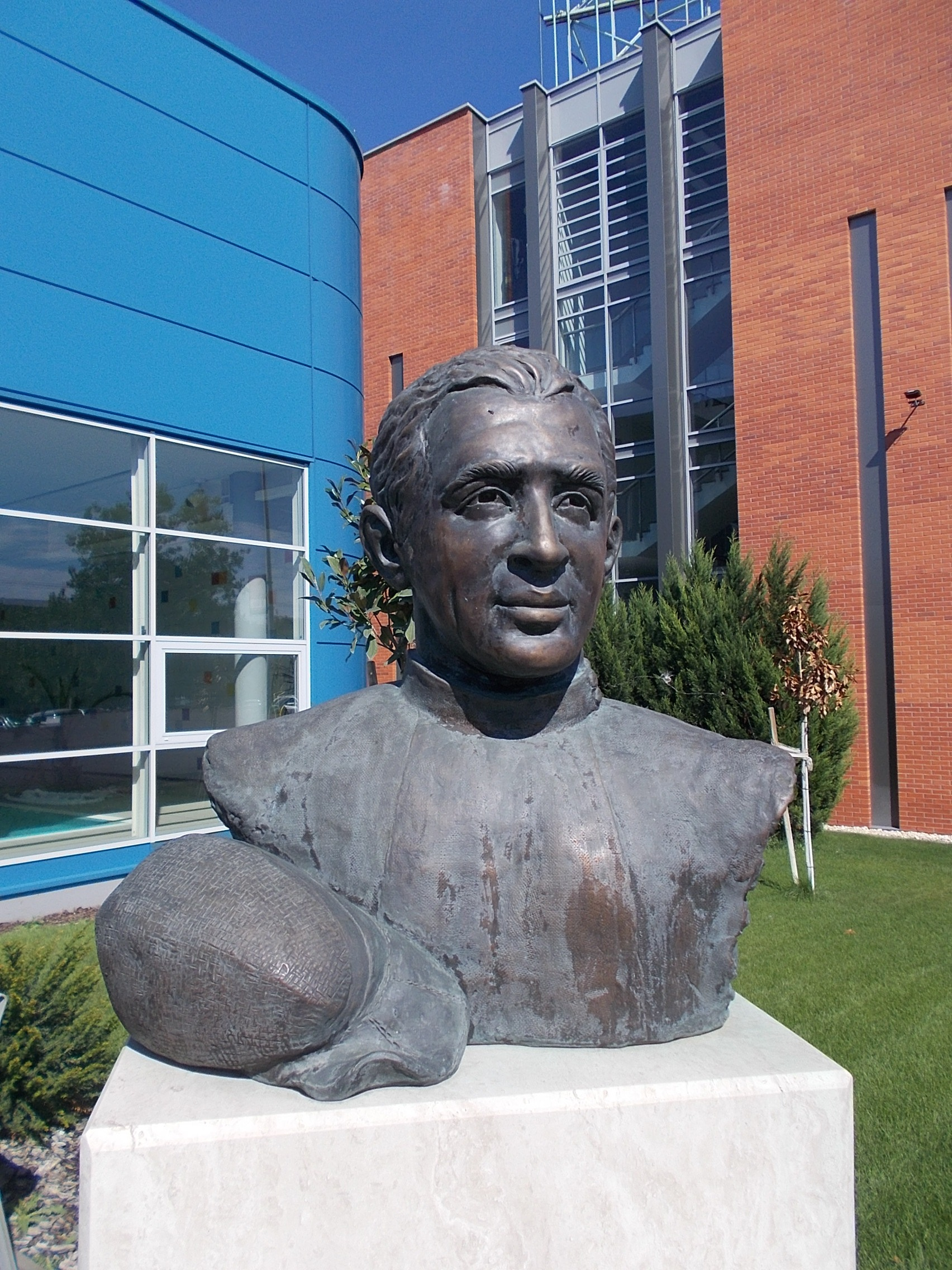
- Bust of gold medalist Csaba Fenyvesi
- Venue: Messegelände Exhibition Halls 12 & 20
- Dates: 4 – 6 September 1972
- Competitors: 72 from 28 nations

Medalists
1st place, gold medalist(s)		Csaba Fenyvesi; Hungary
2nd place, silver medalist(s)		Jacques Ladègaillerie; France
3rd place, bronze medalist(s)		Győző Kulcsár; Hungary

The men's épée was one of eight fencing events on the fencing at the 1972 Summer Olympics programme. It was the sixteenth appearance of the event. The competition was held from 4 to 6 September 1972. 71 fencers from 28 nations competed. Each nation was limited to three fencers. The event was won by Csaba Fenyvesi of Hungary, the nation's second consecutive victory in the event. His countryman Győző Kulcsár, the 1968 gold medalist, earned bronze this time to become the ninth man to win multiple medals in the men's individual épée. Silver went to Jacques Ladègaillerie of France; the French épéeists, a power in the event from 1900 to 1932, earned their first individual medal in 40 years. The three-Games podium streak of the Soviet Union was snapped, with all three Soviet fencers reaching the semifinals but eliminated there.

== Background ==
This was the 16th appearance of the event, which was not held at the first Games in 1896 (with only foil and sabre events held) but has been held at every Summer Olympics since 1900.

Three of the six finalists (the three medalists) from the 1968 Games returned: gold medalist Győző Kulcsár of Hungary, silver medalist (and 1964 gold medalist) Grigory Kriss of the Soviet Union, and bronze medalist (and 1964 fourth-place finisher) Gianluigi Saccaro of Italy. Kriss was the reigning (1971) World Champion.

Hong Kong and Turkey each made their debut in the event. The United States appeared for the 15th time, most among nations, having missed only the 1908 edition of the event.

== Competition format ==
The 1972 tournament returned to the traditional format of entirely pool-play rounds, after two Games of mixed pool-play and knockout rounds in 1964 and 1968. Five rounds were held. Bouts were to 5 touches, with double-losses possible. No barrages were held; touch quotient (touches for divided by touches against) was used to break ties.

- Round 1: 12 pools, with 6 fencers in each pool. The top 4 fencers in each pool advanced, cutting the field from 72 to 48.
- Round 2: 8 pools, with 6 fencers per pool. The top 3 fencers advanced, reducing the number of remaining fencers from 48 to 24.
- Quarterfinals: 4 pools, with 6 fencers per pool. The top 3 fencers advanced, cutting 24 quarterfinalists to 12 semifinalists.
- Semifinals: 2 pools, with 6 fencers each. The top 3 fencers advanced, resulting in 6 finalists.
- Final round: A final pool with the 6 remaining fencers determined the medals and 4th through 6th place.

== Schedule ==
All times are Central European Time (UTC+1)

Date	Time	Round
Monday, 4 September 1972	8:00	Round 1 Round 2 Quarterfinals
Thursday, 30 August 1972	15:30; 19:30	Semifinals; Final

== Results ==
=== Round 1 ===
==== Round 1 Pool A ====
Pos	Fencer	W	L	TF	TA	Notes	GK	RB	DG	PAF	JBH	CM
1	Grigory Kriss (URS)	4	1	25	10	Q		5–3	5–5	5–2	5–0	5–0
2	Reinhold Behr (FRG)	3	2	23	13	Q	3–5		5–0	5–1	5–5	5–2
3	Daniel Giger (SUI)	2	3	17	15	Q	5–5	0–5		2–5	5–0	5–0
4	Peter Askjær-Friis (DEN)	2	3	17	19	Q	2–5	1–5	5–2		4–5	5–2
5	John Bouchier-Hayes (IRL)	2	3	15	22		0–5	5–5	0–5	5–4		5–3
6	Chan Matthew (HKG)	0	5	7	25		0–5	2–5	0–5	2–5	3–5	

Source: Official Report, vol. 3, p. 257

==== Round 1 Pool B ====
Pos	Fencer	W	L	TF	TA	Notes	HJH	NG	LS	BG	LW	AC
1	Hans-Jürgen Hehn (FRG)	4	1	24	12	Q		5–1	4–5	5–1	5–3	5–1
2	Nicola Granieri (ITA)	4	1	21	18	Q	1–5		5–4	5–4	5–3	5–2
3	Luis Stephens (MEX)	3	2	22	22	Q	5–4	4–5		5–4	3–5	5–4
4	Bogdan Gonsior (POL)	2	3	20	18	Q	2–5	4–5	4–5		5–2	5–1
5	Lester Wong (CAN)	1	4	16	23		3–5	3–5	5–3	2–5		3–5
6	Ali Chekr (LIB)	1	4	13	23		1–5	2–5	4–5	1–5	5–3	

Source: Official Report, vol. 3, p. 257

==== Round 1 Pool C ====
Pos	Fencer	W	L	TF	TA	Notes	RE	CF	RM	RH	CK	AT
1	Rolf Edling (SWE)	5	0	25	13	Q		5–2	5–4	5–4	5–1	5–2
2	Claudio Francesconi (ITA)	2	3	18	17	Q	2–5		5–5	5–1	5–1	1–5
3	Reinhard Münster (DEN)	2	3	23	24	Q	4–5	5–5		5–5	4–5	5–4
4	Risto Hurme (FIN)	2	3	20	23	Q	4–5	1–5	5–5		5–4	5–4
5	Christian Kauter (SUI)	2	3	16	21		1–5	1–5	5–4	4–5		5–2
6	Ali Tayla (TUR)	1	4	17	21		2–5	5–1	4–5	4–5	2–5	

Source: Official Report, vol. 3, p. 257

==== Round 1 Pool D ====
Maier was unable to complete his first bout, collapsing during the competition. He "was rushed to the hospital but was rendered quadriplegic from uncertain causes, although a blood clot on the brain was suspected." The bout was not counted in the official results, with the remaining fencers in the pool competing as if the pool had only 5 members.

Pos	Fencer	W	L	TF	TA	Notes	JL	RS	RL	OV	GS	RM
1	Jacques Ladègaillerie (FRA)	3	1	18	11	Q		3–5	5–4	5–1	5–1	
2	Robert Schiel (LUX)	2	2	18	15	Q	5–3		4–5	4–5	5–2	
3	Roberto Levis (PUR)	2	2	18	17	Q	4–5	5–4		4–5	5–3	
4	Omar Vergara (ARG)	2	2	12	18	Q	1–5	5–4	5–4		1–5	
5	Gianluigi Saccaro (ITA)	1	3	11	16		1–5	2–5	3–5	5–1		
6	Rudi Maier (FRG)	0	0	0	0							

Source: Official Report, vol. 3, p. 257

==== Round 1 Pool E ====
Pos	Fencer	W	L	TF	TA	Notes	SP	BU	RT	GM	AAP	RM
1	Sergey Paramonov (URS)	5	0	25	14	Q		5–3	5–2	5–4	5–3	5–2
2	Bernd Uhlig (GDR)	4	1	23	14	Q	3–5		5–4	5–1	5–3	5–1
3	Rudolf Trost (AUT)	3	2	21	20	Q	2–5	4–5		5–4	5–3	5–3
4	George Masin (USA)	1	4	17	24	Q	4–5	1–5	4–5		3–5	5–4
5	Ali Asghar Pashapour (IRI)	1	4	16	23		3–5	3–5	3–5	5–3		2–5
6	Remo Manelli (LUX)	1	4	15	22		2–5	1–5	3–5	4–5	5–2	

Source: Official Report, vol. 3, p. 257

==== Round 1 Pool F ====
Pos	Fencer	W	L	TF	TA	Notes	MvK	RL	TB	AI	GS	AS
1	Morten von Krogh (NOR)	4	1	25	13	Q		5–1	5–5	5–4	5–3	5–0
2	Roland Losert (AUT)	3	2	18	14	Q	1–5		2–5	5–2	5–1	5–1
3	Teddy Bourne (GBR)	2	3	20	18	Q	5–5	5–2		2–5	5–1	3–5
4	Alexandru Istrate (ROU)	2	3	17	18	Q	4–5	2–5	5–2		1–5	5–1
5	Guillermo Saucedo (ARG)	2	3	15	17		3–5	1–5	1–5	5–1		5–1
6	Ali Sleiman (LIB)	1	4	8	23		0–5	1–5	5–3	1–5	1–5	

Source: Official Report, vol. 3, p. 258

==== Round 1 Pool G ====
Pos	Fencer	W	L	TF	TA	Notes	HM	FJ	CB	DF	JN	YDD
1	Horst Melzig (GDR)	4	1	23	11	Q		5–1	3–5	5–2	5–3	5–0
2	François Jeanne (FRA)	4	1	21	11	Q	1–5		5–1	5–4	5–0	5–1
3	Costică Bărăgan (ROU)	4	1	21	18	Q	5–3	1–5		5–3	5–4	5–3
4	Daniel Feraud (ARG)	2	3	19	20	Q	2–5	4–5	3–5		5–4	5–1
5	Jeppe Normann (NOR)	1	4	16	24		3–5	0–5	4–5	4–5		5–4
6	Yves Daniel Darricau (LIB)	0	5	9	23		0–5	1–5	3–5	1–5	4–5	

Source: Official Report, vol. 3, p. 258

==== Round 1 Pool H ====
Pos	Fencer	W	L	TF	TA	Notes	IV	JB	JJ	OM	RE	RM
1	Igor Valetov (URS)	4	1	23	11	Q		3–5	5–3	5–2	5–1	5–0
2	Jacques Brodin (FRA)	4	1	25	14	Q	5–3		5–5	5–5	5–0	5–1
3	Jerzy Janikowski (POL)	3	2	23	18	Q	3–5	5–5		5–4	5–0	5–4
4	Ole Mørch (NOR)	2	3	21	15	Q	2–5	5–5	4–5		5–0	5–0
5	Robert Elliott (HKG)	0	5	6	25		1–5	0–5	0–5	0–5		5–5
6	Roberto Maldonado (PUR)	0	5	10	25		0–5	1–5	4–5	0–5	5–5	

Source: Official Report, vol. 3, p. 258

==== Round 1 Pool I ====
Pos	Fencer	W	L	TF	TA	Notes	GP	PD	HN	JCS	JM	AA
1	Graham Paul (GBR)	3	2	23	21	Q		5–4	4–5	5–4	4–5	5–3
2	Panagiotis Dourakos (GRE)	3	2	23	21	Q	4–5		4–5	5–4	5–2	5–5
3	Henryk Nielaba (POL)	3	2	21	22	Q	5–4	5–4		5–4	3–5	3–5
4	Jean-Charles Seneca (MON)	2	3	22	23	Q	4–5	4–5	4–5		5–4	5–4
5	James Melcher (USA)	2	3	21	22		5–4	2–5	5–3	4–5		5–5
6	Alain Anen (LUX)	1	4	22	23		3–5	5–5	5–3	4–5	5–5	

Source: Official Report, vol. 3, p. 258

==== Round 1 Pool J ====
Pos	Fencer	W	L	TF	TA	Notes	GK	GW	PL	SN	IK	AV
1	Győző Kulcsár (HUN)	4	1	23	18	Q		5–3	3–5	5–2	5–4	5–4
2	Gerry Wiedel (CAN)	3	2	22	18	Q	3–5		5–3	4–5	5–3	5–2
3	Peter Lötscher (SUI)	3	2	23	21	Q	5–3	3–5		5–4	5–5	5–4
4	Stephen Netburn (USA)	3	2	21	21	Q	2–5	5–4	4–5		5–3	5–4
5	Ivan Kemnitz (DEN)	2	3	20	20		4–5	3–5	5–5	3–5		5–0
6	Andreas Vgenopoulos (GRE)	0	5	14	25		4–5	2–5	4–5	4–5	0–5	

Source: Official Report, vol. 3, p. 258

==== Round 1 Pool K ====
Pos	Fencer	W	L	TF	TA	Notes	PS	KHM	AP	OJ	CC	HO
1	Pál Schmitt (HUN)	4	1	22	10	Q		5–3	5–0	2–5	5–2	5–0
2	Karl-Heinz Müller (AUT)	3	2	20	18	Q	3–5		2–5	5–4	5–3	5–1
3	Anton Pongratz (ROU)	3	2	19	18	Q	0–5	5–2		5–3	4–5	5–3
4	Orvar Jönsson (SWE)	2	3	19	20	Q	5–2	4–5	3–5		5–3	2–5
5	Carlos Calderón (MEX)	2	3	18	23		2–5	3–5	5–4	3–5		5–4
6	Herbert Obst (CAN)	1	4	13	22		0–5	1–5	3–5	5–2	4–5	

Source: Official Report, vol. 3, p. 259

==== Round 1 Pool L ====
Pos	Fencer	W	L	TF	TA	Notes	HPS	CF	RJ	JC	CvE	PA
1	Hans-Peter Schulze (GDR)	4	1	22	10	Q		2–5	5–3	5–4	5–4	5–2
2	Csaba Fenyvesi (HUN)	3	2	20	18	Q	5–2		5–1	4–5	5–2	2–5
3	Ralph Johnson (GBR)	3	2	19	18	Q	3–5	1–5		5–4	5–3	5–4
4	Jorge Castillejos (MEX)	2	3	19	20	Q	4–5	5–4	4–5		4–5	5–2
5	Carl von Essen (SWE)	2	3	18	23		4–5	2–5	3–5	5–4		5–3
6	Pirouz Adamiat (IRI)	1	4	13	22		2–5	5–2	4–5	2–5	3–5	

Source: Official Report, vol. 3, p. 259

=== Round 2 ===
==== Round 2 Pool A ====
Pos	Fencer	W	L	TF	TA	Notes	RE	JL	RS	GM	RB	RL
1	Rolf Edling (SWE)	4	1	23	12	Q		3–5	5–2	5–1	5–2	5–2
2	Jacques Ladègaillerie (FRA)	4	1	23	17	Q	5–3		5–4	3–5	5–3	5–2
3	Robert Schiel (LUX)	3	2	21	20	Q	2–5	4–5		5–3	5–4	5–3
4	George Masin (USA)	2	3	16	22		1–5	5–3	3–5		2–5	5–4
5	Reinhold Behr (FRG)	1	3	14	17		2–5	3–5	4–5	5–2		
6	Roberto Levis (PUR)	0	4	11	20		2–5	2–5	3–5	4–5		

Source: Official Report, vol. 3, p. 259

==== Round 2 Pool B ====
Pos	Fencer	W	L	TF	TA	Notes	RH	CF	SP	OV	CB	RJ
1	Risto Hurme (FIN)	3	2	25	15	Q		5–5	5–5	5–1	5–4	5–0
2	Csaba Fenyvesi (HUN)	3	2	24	18	Q	5–5		5–1	4–5	5–4	5–3
3	Sergey Paramonov (URS)	3	2	21	16	Q	5–5	1–5		5–1	5–1	5–4
4	Omar Vergara (ARG)	3	2	17	20		1–5	5–4	1–5		5–2	5–4
5	Costică Bărăgan (ROU)	1	4	16	22		4–5	4–5	1–5	2–5		5–2
6	Ralph Johnson (GBR)	0	5	13	25		0–5	3–5	4–5	4–5	2–5	

Source: Official Report, vol. 3, p. 259

==== Round 2 Pool C ====
Pos	Fencer	W	L	TF	TA	Notes	HN	GK	NG	OM	RL	PAF
1	Henryk Nielaba (POL)	5	0	25	18	Q		5–3	5–3	5–4	5–4	5–4
2	Grigory Kriss (URS)	2	3	23	20	Q	3–5		5–5	5–2	5–5	5–3
3	Nicola Granieri (ITA)	2	3	20	20	Q	3–5	5–5		5–2	5–3	2–5
4	Ole Mørch (NOR)	2	3	18	24		4–5	2–5	2–5		5–4	5–5
5	Roland Losert (AUT)	1	4	21	22		4–5	5–5	3–5	4–5		5–2
6	Peter Askjær-Friis (DEN)	1	4	19	22		4–5	3–5	5–2	5–5	2–5	

Source: Official Report, vol. 3, p. 259

==== Round 2 Pool D ====
Pos	Fencer	W	L	TF	TA	Notes	PS	JJ	DG	AI	SN	HPS
1	Pál Schmitt (HUN)	4	1	24	16	Q		4–5	5–4	5–4	5–1	5–2
2	Jerzy Janikowski (POL)	4	1	22	20	Q	5–4		5–4	2–5	5–4	5–3
3	Daniel Giger (SUI)	3	2	23	18	Q	4–5	4–5		5–3	5–1	5–4
4	Alexandru Istrate (ROU)	2	3	19	18		4–5	5–2	3–5		2–5	5–1
5	Stephen Netburn (USA)	2	3	16	21		1–5	4–5	1–5	5–2		5–4
6	Hans-Peter Schulze (GDR)	0	5	14	25		2–5	3–5	4–5	1–5	4–5	

Source: Official Report, vol. 3, p. 260

==== Round 2 Pool E ====
Pos	Fencer	W	L	TF	TA	Notes	IV	BU	RT	TB	GW	DF
1	Igor Valetov (URS)	4	1	23	13	Q		3–5	5–0	5–3	5–3	5–2
2	Bernd Uhlig (GDR)	4	1	22	14	Q	5–3		2–5	5–3	5–1	5–2
3	Rudolf Trost (AUT)	4	1	20	18	Q	0–5	5–2		5–3	5–4	5–4
4	Teddy Bourne (GBR)	2	3	19	17		3–5	3–5	3–5		5–0	5–2
5	Gerry Wiedel (CAN)	1	4	13	23		3–5	1–5	4–5	0–5		5–3
6	Daniel Feraud (ARG)	0	5	13	25		2–5	2–5	4–5	2–5	3–5	

Source: Official Report, vol. 3, p. 260

==== Round 2 Pool F ====
Pos	Fencer	W	L	TF	TA	Notes	GK	BG	HM	KHM	OJ	LS
1	Győző Kulcsár (HUN)	4	1	21	13	Q		5–2	1–5	5–2	5–2	5–2
2	Bogdan Gonsior (POL)	3	2	21	16	Q	2–5		4–5	5–3	5–1	5–2
3	Horst Melzig (GDR)	3	2	22	19	Q	5–1	5–4		2–5	5–4	5–5
4	Karl-Heinz Müller (AUT)	3	2	20	18		2–5	3–5	5–2		5–4	5–2
5	Orvar Jönsson (SWE)	1	4	16	22		2–5	1–5	4–5	4–5		5–2
6	Luis Stephens (MEX)	1	4	13	25		2–5	2–5	5–5	2–5	2–5	

Source: Official Report, vol. 3, p. 260

==== Round 2 Pool G ====
Pos	Fencer	W	L	TF	TA	Notes	JB	HJH	AP	JCS	CF	GP
1	Jacques Brodin (FRA)	5	0	25	13	Q		5–3	5–2	5–5	5–1	5–2
2	Hans-Jürgen Hehn (FRG)	3	2	21	18	Q	3–5		5–3	3–5	5–3	5–2
3	Anton Pongratz (ROU)	2	3	18	18	Q	2–5	3–5		5–1	3–5	5–2
4	Jean-Charles Seneca (MON)	2	3	21	23		5–5	5–3	1–5		5–5	5–5
5	Claudio Francesconi (ITA)	2	3	17	23		1–5	3–5	5–3	5–5		3–5
6	Graham Paul (GBR)	1	4	16	23		2–5	2–5	2–5	5–5	5–3	

Source: Official Report, vol. 3, p. 260

==== Round 2 Pool H ====
Pos	Fencer	W	L	TF	TA	Notes	PL	FJ	MvK	RM	PD	JC
1	Peter Lötscher (SUI)	4	1	24	14	Q		4–5	5–2	5–0	5–4	5–3
2	François Jeanne (FRA)	4	1	20	16	Q	5–4		0–5	5–1	5–3	5–3
3	Morten von Krogh (NOR)	3	2	21	16	Q	2–5	5–0		4–5	5–4	5–2
4	Reinhard Münster (DEN)	2	3	14	20		0–5	1–5	5–4		3–5	5–1
5	Panagiotis Dourakos (GRE)	1	4	19	23		4–5	3–5	4–5	5–3		3–5
6	Jorge Castillejos (MEX)	1	4	14	23		3–5	3–5	2–5	1–5	5–3	

Source: Official Report, vol. 3, p. 260

=== Quarterfinals ===
==== Quarterfinal A ====
Pos	Fencer	W	L	TF	TA	Notes	AP	SP	JB	BG	RT	PS
1	Anton Pongratz (ROU)	3	2	23	18	Q		5–3	4–5	4–5	5–3	5–2
2	Sergey Paramonov (URS)	3	2	22	18	Q	3–5		5–2	5–2	5–4	4–5
3	Jacques Brodin (FRA)	3	2	21	20	Q	5–4	2–5		5–4	4–5	5–2
4	Bogdan Gonsior (POL)	3	2	21	21		5–4	2–5	4–5		5–3	5–4
5	Rudolf Trost (AUT)	2	3	20	22		3–5	4–5	5–4	3–5		5–3
6	Pál Schmitt (HUN)	1	4	16	24		2–5	5–4	2–5	4–5	3–5	

Source: Official Report, vol. 3, p. 261

==== Quarterfinal B ====
Pos	Fencer	W	L	TF	TA	Notes	CF	DG	JL	HN	BU	NG
1	Csaba Fenyvesi (HUN)	4	1	24	18	Q		5–3	5–4	4–5	5–3	5–3
2	Daniel Giger (SUI)	3	2	21	15	Q	3–5		3–5	5–2	5–3	5–0
3	Jacques Ladègaillerie (FRA)	3	2	22	16	Q	4–5	5–3		5–2	3–5	5–1
4	Henryk Nielaba (POL)	3	2	19	22		5–4	2–5	2–5		5–4	5–4
5	Bernd Uhlig (GDR)	2	3	20	21		3–5	3–5	5–3	4–5		5–3
6	Nicola Granieri (ITA)	0	5	11	25		3–5	0–5	1–5	4–5	3–5	

Source: Official Report, vol. 3, p. 261

==== Quarterfinal C ====
Pos	Fencer	W	L	TF	TA	Notes	GKr	RE	GKu	FJ	HJH	MvK
1	Grigory Kriss (URS)	4	1	24	16	Q		5–2	4–5	5–4	5–1	5–4
2	Rolf Edling (SWE)	4	1	22	19	Q	2–5		5–4	5–4	5–4	5–2
3	Győző Kulcsár (HUN)	3	2	20	21	Q	5–4	4–5		1–5	5–3	5–4
4	François Jeanne (FRA)	2	3	22	19		4–5	4–5	5–1		4–5	5–3
5	Hans-Jürgen Hehn (FRG)	2	3	18	23		1–5	4–5	3–5	5–4		5–4
6	Morten von Krogh (NOR)	0	5	17	25		4–5	2–5	4–5	3–5	4–5	

Source: Official Report, vol. 3, p. 261

==== Quarterfinal D ====
Pos	Fencer	W	L	TF	TA	Notes	HM	JJ	IV	RS	PL	RH
1	Horst Melzig (GDR)	4	1	23	15	Q		5–2	5–3	5–2	3–5	5–3
2	Jerzy Janikowski (POL)	3	2	22	21	Q	2–5		5–5	5–3	5–4	5–4
3	Igor Valetov (URS)	2	3	23	19	Q	3–5	5–5		5–1	5–5	5–3
4	Robert Schiel (LUX)	2	3	16	23		2–5	3–5	1–5		5–4	5–4
5	Peter Lötscher (SUI)	1	4	22	23		5–3	4–5	5–5	4–5		4–5
6	Risto Hurme (FIN)	1	4	19	24		3–5	4–5	3–5	4–5	5–4	

Source: Official Report, vol. 3, p. 261

=== Semifinals ===
==== Semifinal A ====
Pos	Fencer	W	L	TF	TA	Notes	GK	RE	JB	HM	DG	SP
1	Győző Kulcsár (HUN)	4	1	20	17	Q		0–5	5–3	5–3	5–2	5–4
2	Rolf Edling (SWE)	3	2	23	16	Q	5–0		3–5	5–4	5–5	5–2
3	Jacques Brodin (FRA)	2	3	22	22	Q	3–5	5–3		5–4	4–5	5–5
4	Horst Melzig (GDR)	2	3	21	22		3–5	4–5	4–5		5–4	5–3
5	Daniel Giger (SUI)	1	4	21	24		2–5	5–5	5–4	4–5		5–5
6	Sergey Paramonov (URS)	0	5	19	25		4–5	2–5	5–5	3–5	5–5	

Source: Official Report, vol. 3, p. 261

==== Semifinal B ====
Pos	Fencer	W	L	TF	TA	Notes	AP	JL	CF	JJ	IV	GK
1	Anton Pongratz (ROU)	4	1	21	17	Q		5–4	5–2	5–4	1–5	5–2
2	Jacques Ladègaillerie (FRA)	3	2	24	18	Q	4–5		5–3	5–3	5–3	5–5
3	Csaba Fenyvesi (HUN)	3	2	20	19	Q	2–5	3–5		5–3	5–3	5–3
4	Jerzy Janikowski (POL)	2	3	19	22		4–5	2–5	3–5		5–4	5–3
5	Igor Valetov (URS)	1	4	19	21		5–1	3–5	3–5	4–5		4–5
6	Grigory Kriss (URS)	1	4	18	24		2–5	5–5	3–5	3–5	5–4	

Source: Official Report, vol. 3, p. 262

=== Final ===
Ladègaillerie had a touch-quotient of 1.211, Kulcsár had 1.053, and Pongratz had 0.950.

Pos	Fencer	W	L	TF	TA	CF	JL	GK	AP	RE	JB
1st place, gold medalist(s)	Csaba Fenyvesi (HUN)	4	1	25	10		5–5	5–2	5–1	5–1	5–1
2nd place, silver medalist(s)	Jacques Ladègaillerie (FRA)	3	2	23	19	5–5		5–3	3–5	5–3	5–3
3rd place, bronze medalist(s)	Győző Kulcsár (HUN)	3	2	20	19	2–5	3–5		5–3	5–3	5–3
4	Anton Pongratz (ROU)	3	2	19	20	1–5	5–3	3–5		5–3	5–4
5	Rolf Edling (SWE)	1	4	15	22	1–5	3–5	3–5	3–5		5–2
6	Jacques Brodin (FRA)	0	5	13	25	1–5	3–5	3–5	4–5	2–5	

Source: Official Report, vol. 3, p. 262

== Final classification ==
Rank	Fencer	Nation
1st place, gold medalist(s)	Csaba Fenyvesi	Hungary
2nd place, silver medalist(s)	Jacques Ladègaillerie	France
3rd place, bronze medalist(s)	Győző Kulcsár	Hungary
4	Anton Pongratz	Romania
5	Rolf Edling	Sweden
6	Jacques Brodin	France
7	Horst Melzig	East Germany
7	Jerzy Janikowski	Poland
9	Daniel Giger	Switzerland
9	Igor Valetov	Soviet Union
11	Sergey Paramonov	Soviet Union
11	Grigory Kriss	Soviet Union
13	Bogdan Gonsior	Poland
13	Henryk Nielaba	Poland
13	François Jeanne	France
13	Robert Schiel	Luxembourg
17	Rudolf Trost	Austria
17	Bernd Uhlig	East Germany
17	Hans-Jürgen Hehn	West Germany
17	Peter Lötscher	Switzerland
21	Pál Schmitt	Hungary
21	Nicola Granieri	Italy
21	Morten von Krogh	Norway
21	Risto Hurme	Finland
25	George Masin	United States
25	Omar Vergara	Argentina
25	Ole Mørch	Norway
25	Alexandru Istrate	Romania
25	Teddy Bourne	Great Britain
25	Karl-Heinz Müller	Austria
25	Jean-Charles Seneca	Monaco
25	Reinhard Münster	Denmark
33	Reinhold Behr	West Germany
33	Costică Bărăgan	Romania
33	Roland Losert	Austria
33	Stephen Netburn	United States
33	Gerry Wiedel	Canada
33	Orvar Jönsson	Sweden
33	Claudio Francesconi	Italy
33	Panagiotis Dourakos	Greece
41	Roberto Levis	Puerto Rico
41	Ralph Johnson	Great Britain
41	Peter Askjær-Friis	Denmark
41	Hans-Peter Schulze	East Germany
41	Daniel Feraud	Argentina
41	Luis Stephens	Mexico
41	Graham Paul	Great Britain
41	Jorge Castillejos	Mexico
49	John Bouchier-Hayes	Ireland
49	Lester Wong	Canada
49	Christian Kauter	Switzerland
49	Gianluigi Saccaro	Italy
49	Ali Asghar Pashapour	Iran
49	Guillermo Saucedo	Argentina
49	Jeppe Normann	Norway
49	Robert Elliott	Hong Kong
49	James Melcher	United States
49	Ivan Kemnitz	Denmark
49	Carlos Calderón	Mexico
49	Carl von Essen	Sweden
61	Chan Matthew	Hong Kong
61	Ali Chekr	Lebanon
61	Ali Tayla	Turkey
61	Remo Manelli	Luxembourg
61	Ali Sleiman	Lebanon
61	Yves Daniel Darricau	Lebanon
61	Roberto Maldonado	Puerto Rico
61	Alain Anen	Luxembourg
61	Andreas Vgenopoulos	Greece
61	Herbert Obst	Canada
61	Pirouz Adamiat	Iran
61	Rudi Maier	West Germany
