= Fencing at the 1972 Summer Olympics – Men's team épée =

Men's team épée at the Games of the XX Olympiad
- Venue: Exhibition Halls 12 & 20
- Dates: 8 – 9 September 1972
- Competitors: 94 from 20 nations

Medalists
1st place, gold medalist(s)		Csaba Fenyvesi; Győző Kulcsár; Pál Schmitt; Sándor Erdős; István Osztrics	Hungary
2nd place, silver medalist(s)		Guy Evéquoz; Peter Lötscher; Daniel Giger; Christian Kauter; François Suchanecki	Switzerland
3rd place, bronze medalist(s)		Grigory Kriss; Viktor Modzolevsky; Georgi Zažitski; Sergey Paramonov; Igor Valetov	Soviet Union

The men's team épée was one of eight fencing events on the fencing at the 1972 Summer Olympics programme. It was the fourteenth appearance of the event. The competition was held from 8 to 9 September 1972. 94 fencers from 20 nations competed.

== Rosters ==
Argentina

- Daniel Feraud
- Fernando Lupiz
- Guillermo Saucedo
- Omar Vergara

Austria

- Roland Losert
- Karl-Heinz Müller
- Herbert Polzhuber
- Rudolf Trost

Canada

- Magdy Conyd
- Herbert Obst
- Gerry Wiedel
- Lester Wong

Denmark

- Torben Bjerre-Poulsen
- Peter Askjær-Friis
- Ivan Kemnitz
- Reinhard Münster
- Jørgen Thorup

East Germany

- Harry Fiedler
- Eckhard Mannischeff
- Horst Melzig
- Hans-Peter Schulze
- Bernd Uhlig

France

- François Jeanne
- Jacques Brodin
- Pierre Marchand
- Jean-Pierre Allemand
- Jacques La Degaillerie

Great Britain

- Teddy Bourne
- Bill Hoskyns
- Edward Hudson
- Ralph Johnson
- Graham Paul

Hungary

- Csaba Fenyvesi
- Győző Kulcsár
- Pál Schmitt
- Sándor Erdős
- István Osztrics

Italy

- Claudio Francesconi
- Nicola Granieri
- Gianluigi Placella
- Gianluigi Saccaro
- Pier Alberto Testoni

Lebanon

- Ali Chekr
- Yves Daniel Darricau
- Fawzi Merhi
- Ali Sleiman

Luxembourg

- Alain Anen
- Aly Doerfel
- Romain Manelli
- Remo Manelli
- Robert Schiel

Mexico

- Carlos Calderón
- Jorge Castillejos
- Hermilo Leal
- Luis Stephens

Norway

- Jan von Koss
- Jeppe Normann
- Ole Mørch
- Claus Mørch Jr.

Poland

- Bohdan Andrzejewski
- Jerzy Janikowski
- Henryk Nielaba
- Kazimierz Barburski
- Bogdan Gonsior

Romania

- Constantin Duțu
- Costică Bărăgan
- Anton Pongratz
- Alexandru Istrate
- Nicolae Iorgu

Soviet Union

- Grigory Kriss
- Viktor Modzolevsky
- Georgi Zažitski
- Sergey Paramonov
- Igor Valetov

Sweden

- Hans Wieselgren
- Carl von Essen
- Orvar Jönsson
- Rolf Edling
- Per Sundberg

Switzerland

- Guy Evéquoz
- Peter Lötscher
- Daniel Giger
- Christian Kauter
- François Suchanecki

United States

- Scotty Bozek
- Paul Makler Jr.
- George Masin
- James Melcher
- Stephen Netburn

West Germany

- Reinhold Behr
- Hans-Jürgen Hehn
- Harald Hein
- Dieter Jung
- Max Geuter

== Results ==
=== Round 1 ===
==== Round 1 Pool A ====
Pos	Team	W	L	BW	BL	Qual.	FRA	NOR	GBR	LIB
1	France	3	0	31	14	QQ		9–4	10–6	12–4
2	Norway	2	1	26	19	Q16	4–9		9–7	13–3
3	Great Britain	0	2	13	19		6–10	7–9		
4	Lebanon	0	2	7	25		4–12	3–13		

Source: Official Report, vol. 3, pp. 271–74

==== Round 1 Pool B ====
Pos	Team	W	L	BW	BL	Qual.	URS	AUT	ITA	CAN
1	Soviet Union	3	0	35	9	QQ		9–3	13–3	13–3
2	Austria	2	1	24	20	Q16	3–9		9–7	12–4
3	Italy	0	2	10	22		3–13	7–9		
4	Canada	0	2	7	25		3–13	4–12		

Source: Official Report, vol. 3, pp. 271–74

==== Round 1 Pool C ====
Pos	Team	W	L	BW	BL	Qual.	HUN	SWE	FRG	DEN
1	Hungary	2	1	31	14	QQ		5–10	10–4	16–0
2	Sweden	2	1	27	18	Q16	10–5		7–8	10–5
3	West Germany	2	1	20	21		4–10	8–7		8–4
4	Denmark	0	3	9	34		0–16	5–10	4–8	

Source: Official Report, vol. 3, pp. 271–74

==== Round 1 Pool D ====
Pos	Team	W	L	BW	BL	Qual.	SUI	POL	LUX	MEX
1	Switzerland	3	0	36	11	QQ		9–6	12–4	15–1
2	Poland	2	1	26	20	QQ	6–9		9–6	11–5
3	Luxembourg	0	2	10	21		4–12	6–9		
4	Mexico	0	2	6	26		1–15	5–11		

Source: Official Report, vol. 3, pp. 271–74

==== Round 1 Pool E ====
Pos	Team	W	L	BW	BL	Qual.	ROU	USA	GDR	ARG
1	Romania	2	1	32	16	QQ		8.59–8.64	11–5	13–3
2	United States	2	1	30	18	Q16	8.64–8.59		8.61–8.65	14–2
3	East Germany	2	1	26	22		5–11	8.65–8.61		13–3
4	Argentina	0	3	7	25		3–13	2–14	3–13	

Source: Official Report, vol. 3, pp. 271–74

=== Elimination rounds ===
==== Main bracket ====
First round
A2	Norway	8
B2	Austria	2
C2	Sweden	9
E2	United States	2

Second round
A2	Norway	2
A1	France	8
D1	Switzerland	9
E1	Romania	2
C2	Sweden	7
B1	Soviet Union	8
C1	Hungary	9
D2	Poland	1

Semifinals
A1	France	5
D1	Switzerland	8
B1	Soviet Union	5
C1	Hungary	8

Finals
D1	Switzerland	4
C1	Hungary	8
Third place
A1	France	4
B1	Soviet Union	9

==== 5th place consolation bracket ====
Semifinals
A2	Norway	5
E1	Romania	9
C2	Sweden	7
D2	Poland	9

Finals
E1	Romania	9
D2	Poland	3
