= Fencing at the 1972 Summer Olympics =

Fencing at the Games of the XX Olympiad

At the 1972 Summer Olympics in Munich, eight events in fencing were contested. Men competed in both individual and team events for each of the three weapon types (épée, foil and sabre), but women competed only in foil events.

== Medal summary ==
=== Men's events ===
Games	Gold	Silver	Bronze
Individual épée	Csaba Fenyvesi; Hungary	Jacques Ladegaillerie; France	Győző Kulcsár; Hungary
team épée	Hungary; Sándor Erdős; Csaba Fenyvesi; Győző Kulcsár; Pál Schmitt; István Osztrics	Switzerland; Guy Evequoz; Daniel Giger; Christian Kauter; Peter Lötscher; François Suchanecki	Soviet Union; Viktor Modzolevsky; Sergei Paramonov; Igor Valetov; Georgi Zažitski; Grigori Kriss
Individual foil	Witold Woyda; Poland	Jenő Kamuti; Hungary	Christian Noël; France
team foil	Poland; Marek Dąbrowski; Jerzy Kaczmarek; Lech Koziejowski; Witold Woyda; Arkadiusz Godel	Soviet Union; Vladimir Denisov; Anatoli Kotetsev; Leonid Romanov; Vasili Stankovich; Victor Putyatin	France; Jean-Claude Magnan; Christian Noël; Daniel Revenu; Bernard Talvard; Gilles Berolatti
Individual sabre	Viktor Sidyak; Soviet Union	Péter Marót; Hungary	Vladimir Nazlymov; Soviet Union
team sabre	Italy; Michele Maffei; Mario Aldo Montano; Mario Tullio Montano; Rolando Rigoli; Cesare Salvadori	Soviet Union; Viktor Bashenov; Vladimir Nazlymov; Viktor Sidyak; Eduard Vinokurov; Mark Rakita	Hungary; Pál Gerevich; Tamás Kovács; Péter Marót; Tibor Pézsa; Péter Bakonyi

=== Women's events ===
Games	Gold	Silver	Bronze
Individual foil	Antonella Ragno-Lonzi; Italy	Ildikó Bóbis; Hungary	Galina Gorokhova; Soviet Union
team foil	Soviet Union; Elena Belova; Galina Gorokhova; Tatyana Samusenko; Aleksandra Zabelina; Svetlana Tširkova	Hungary; Ildikó Bóbis; Ildikó Újlaky-Rejtő; Ildikó Schwarczenberger; Mária Gulácsi-Szolnoki; Ildikó Matuscsák-Rónay	Romania; Ileana Gyulai-Drimba-Jenei; Ana Dersidan-Ene-Pascu; Ecaterina Iencic-Stahl; Olga Orban-Szabo

== Medal table ==
Rank	Nation	Gold	Silver	Bronze	Total
1	Hungary	2	4	2	8
2	Soviet Union	2	2	3	7
3	Italy	2	0	0	2
3	Poland	2	0	0	2
5	France	0	1	2	3
6	Switzerland	0	1	0	1
7	Romania	0	0	1	1
Totals (7 entries)		8	8	8	24

== Participating nations ==
A total of 298 fencers (233 men and 65 women) from 37 nations competed at the Munich Games:

- Argentina (5)
- Australia (4)
- Austria (13)
- Belgium (1)
- Bulgaria (5)
- Canada (6)
- Cuba (15)
- Czechoslovakia (2)
- Denmark (6)
- East Germany (5)
- Finland (1)
- France (19)
- Great Britain (19)
- Greece (3)
- Hong Kong (2)
- Hungary (19)
- Iran (2)
- Ireland (1)
- Israel (2)
- Italy (19)
- Japan (5)
- Lebanon (4)
- Luxembourg (5)
- Mexico (6)
- Monaco (1)
- Netherlands (1)
- Norway (5)
- Peru (1)
- Poland (20)
- Puerto Rico (2)
- Romania (19)
- Soviet Union (20)
- Sweden (6)
- Switzerland (12)
- Turkey (4)
- United States (19)
- West Germany (19)

== See also ==
- David Dushman
