= 1972 Summer Olympics Parade of Nations =

During the Parade of Nations section of the 1972 Summer Olympics opening ceremony, athletes from each country participating in the Olympics paraded in the arena, preceded by their flag. The flag was borne by a sportsperson from that country chosen either by the National Olympic Committee or by the athletes themselves to represent their country.

== Parade order ==
As the nation of the first modern Olympic Games, Greece entered the stadium first; whereas, the host nation West Germany marched last, according with tradition and IOC guidelines. Announcers in the stadium read off the names of the marching nations in the host country's language, German, by actor and television personality Joachim Fuchsberger and music during the parade of nations is composed by Kurt Edelhagen.

Whilst most countries entered under their short names, a few entered under acronym or alternative names, mostly due to political and naming disputes. The People's Republic of the Congo entered as Congo (Kongo instead of Volksrepublik Kongo), South Korea (Republic of Korea) entered as Korea instead of Republik Korea, Taiwan (Republic of China) entered as Republik China, and South Vietnam (Republic of Vietnam) entered as Vietnam. Acronyms used during the ceremony like East Germany (German Democratic Republic), North Korea (Democratic People's Republic of Korea) and Soviet Union (Union of Soviet Socialist Republics) entered respectively as DDR (Deutsche Demokratische Republik), DVR Korea (Demokratische Volksrepublik Korea) and UdSSR (Union der Sozialistischen Sowjeterepubliken), United States in other hand entered the same as English, USA instead of its full German name Vereinigte Staaten von Amerika, and host nation West Germany (Federal Republic of Germany) entered as Germany (Deutschland instead of Bundesrepublik Deutschland or its acronym BRD) to avoid with the two Germanies.

121 nations entered the stadium with a combined total of 7,134 athletes. Eleven nations made their Olympic debut, namely Albania, Dahomey (now Benin), Gabon, North Korea, Lesotho, Malawi, Saudi Arabia, Somalia, Swaziland, Togo, Upper Volta (now Burkina Faso). Rhodesia's invitation to take part in the 1972 Summer Games was withdrawn by the International Olympic Committee four days before the opening ceremony, in response to African countries' (such as Ethiopia and Kenya) protests against the Rhodesian government. (Rhodesia did, however, compete in the 1972 Summer Paralympics, held a little earlier in Heidelberg.) Rhodesian athletes would have been marched between Republic of China and Romania.

== List ==
The following is a list of each country's announced flag bearer. The list is sorted by the order in which each nation appears in the parade of nations. The names are given in their official designations by the IOC.

This table is sortable by country name (in German), the flag bearer's name, and the flag bearer's sport.

Order	Nation	German	Flag bearer	Sport
1	Greece	Griechenland	Khristos Papanikolaou	Athletics
2	Egypt	Ägypten	Kamal Kamel El-Guamel	Basketball
3	Ethiopia	Äthiopien	Mamo Wolde	Athletics
4	Afghanistan	Afghanistan	Ghulam Dastagir	Wrestling
5	Albania	Albanien	Afërdita Tusha	Shooting
6	Algeria	Algerien	Azzedine Azzouzi	Athletics
7	Argentina	Argentinien	Carlos Cesar Delia	Equestrian
8	Australia	Australien	Dennis Green	Canoeing
9	Bahamas	Bahamas	Mike Sands	Athletics
10	Barbados	Barbados	Anthony Phillips	Weightlifting
11	Belgium	Belgien	Gaston Roelants	Athletics
12	Bermuda	Bermuda	Kirk Cooper	Sailing
13	Bolivia	Bolivien	Roberto Nielsen-Reyes	Equestrian
14	Brazil	Brasilien	Luiz Cláudio Menon	Basketball
15	British Honduras	Britisch Honduras	Gilmore Hinksen	Official
16	Bulgaria	Bulgarien	Dimitar Zlatanov	Volleyball
17	Burma	Burma	Win Maung	Football
18	Chile	Chile	René Varas	Equestrian
19	Costa Rica	Costa Rica	Hugo Chamberlain	Shooting
20	Denmark	Dänemark	Peder Pedersen	Cycling
21	Dahomey	Dahomey	Ibrahima Idrissou	Athletics
22	German Democratic Republic	DDR (Note: DDR – Deutsche Demokratische Republik)	Manfred Wolke	Boxing
23	Dominican Republic	Dominikanische Republik	Emilio Berroa	Weightlifting
24	Democratic People's Republic of Korea	DVR Korea (Note: DVRK – Demokratische Volksrepublik Korea)	Kim Man-dok	Official
25	Ecuador	Ecuador	Abdalá Bucaram	Athletics
26	Ivory Coast	Elfenbeinküste	Simbara Maki	Athletics
27	El Salvador	El Salvador	Salvador Vilanova	Swimming
28	Fiji	Fidschi	Usaia Sotutu	Athletics
29	Finland	Finnland	Ilkka Nummisto	Canoeing
30	France	Frankreich	Jean-Claude Magnan	Fencing
31	Gabon	Gabun	Matias Moussobou	Official
32	Ghana	Ghana	Sam Bugri	Athletics
33	Great Britain	Großbritannien	David Broome	Equestrian
34	Guatemala	Guatemala	Víctor Castellanos	Shooting
35	Guyana	Guyana	Gordon Sankis	Official
36	Haiti	Haiti	Jules Meliner	Official
37	Hong Kong	Hong Kong	Peter Rull Sr.	Shooting
38	India	Indien	D. N. Devine Jones	Football (official)
39	Indonesia	Indonesien	Wiem Gommies	Boxing
40	Iran	Iran	Abdollah Movahed	Wrestling
41	Ireland	Irland	Ronnie McMahon	Equestrian
42	Iceland	Island	Geir Hallsteinsson	Handball
43	Israel	Israel	Henry Hershkowitz	Shooting
44	Italy	Italien	Abdon Pamich	Athletics
45	Jamaica	Jamaika	Lennox Miller	Athletics
46	Japan	Japan	Masatoshi Shinomaki	Judo
47	Yugoslavia	Jugoslawien	Mirko Sandić	Water polo
48	Virgin Islands	Jungferninseln	William Peets	Boxing
49	Khmer Republic	Kambodscha	Chaing Cheng	Boxing (official)
50	Cameroon	Kamerun	Gaston Malam	Athletics
51	Canada	Kanada	Douglas Rogers	Judo
52	Kenya	Kenia	Kipchoge Keino	Athletics
53	Colombia	Kolumbien	Alfonso Pérez	Boxing
54	Republic of the Congo	Kongo	Alphonse Mandonda	Athletics
55	Republic of Korea	Korea	Kim Ji-hak	Official
56	Cuba	Kuba	Teófilo Stevenson	Boxing
57	Kuwait	Kuwait	Younis Abdallah	Athletics
58	Lesotho	Lesotho	Motsapi Moorosi	Athletics
59	Lebanon	Libanon	Mohamed Tarabulsi	Weightlifting
60	Liberia	Liberia	Thomas Howe	Athletics
61	Liechtenstein	Liechtenstein	Eduard von Falz-Fein	Non-competitor
62	Luxembourg	Luxemburg	Charles Sowa	Athletics
63	Madagascar	Madagaskar	Jean-Aimé Randrianalijaona	Athletics
64	Malawi	Malawi	Martin Matupi	Athletics
65	Malaysia	Malaysia	Ali Bakar	Football
66	Mali	Mali	Namakoro Niaré	Athletics
67	Malta	Malta	Joseph Grech	Shooting
68	Morocco	Marokko	Moustafa Belhmira	Judo
69	Mexico	Mexiko	Felipe Muñoz	Swimming
70	Monaco	Monaco	Jean-Charles Seneca	Fencing
71	Mongolia	Mongolei	Bazarragchaagiin Jamsran	Wrestling
72	Nepal	Nepal	Jit Bahadur Khatri Chhetri	Athletics
73	New Zealand	Neuseeland	Les Mills	Athletics
74	Nicaragua	Nicaragua	Don Vélez	Athletics
75	Netherlands	Niederlande	Nico Spits	Field hockey
76	Netherlands Antilles	Niederländische Antillen	Bèto Adriana	Shooting
77	Niger	Niger	Issaka Dabore	Boxing
78	Nigeria	Nigeria	Benedict Majekodunmi	Athletics
79	Norway	Norwegen	Harald Barlie	Wrestling
80	Upper Volta	Obervolta	André Bicaba	Athletics
81	Austria	Österreich	Hubert Raudaschl	Sailing
82	Pakistan	Pakistan	Muhammad Arshad Malik	Weightlifting
83	Panama	Panama	Donaldo Arza	Boxing
84	Paraguay	Paraguay	Arnulfo Becker	Shooting
85	Peru	Peru	Enrique Barúa	Fencing
86	Philippines	Philippinen	Jimmy Mariano	Basketball
87	Poland	Polen	Waldemar Baszanowski	Weightlifting
88	Portugal	Portugal	Armando Aldegalega	Athletics
89	Puerto Rico	Puerto Rico	Arnaldo Bristol	Athletics
90	Republic of China	Republik China	Chi Cheng	Athletics
91	Romania	Rumänien	Aurel Vernescu	Canoeing
92	Zambia	Sambia	Julius Luipa	Boxing
93	San Marino	San Marino	Italo Casali	Shooting
94	Saudi Arabia	Saudi-Arabien	Bilal Said Al-Azma	Athletics
95	Sweden	Schweden	Jan Jönsson	Equestrian
96	Switzerland	Schweiz	Urs von Wartburg	Athletics
97	Senegal	Senegal	Robert N'Diaye	Wrestling
98	Singapore	Singapur	Pat Chan	Swimming
99	Somalia	Somalia	Mohamed Aboker	Athletics
100	Spain	Spanien	Francisco Fernández Ochoa	Non-competitor
101	Ceylon	Sri Lanka (Ceylon)	Lucien Rosa	Athletics
102	Sudan	Sudan	Abdel Wahab Abdullah Salih	Boxing
103	Suriname	Surinam	Sammy Monsels	Athletics
104	Swaziland	Swasiland	Richard Mabuza	Athletics
105	Syria	Syrien	Mounzer Khatib	Shooting
106	Tanzania	Tansania	Claver Kamanya	Athletics
107	Thailand	Thailand	Rangsit Yanothai	Shooting
108	Togo	Togo	Roger Kangni	Athletics
109	Trinidad and Tobago	Trinidad und Tobago	Hasely Crawford	Athletics
110	Chad	Tschad	Ahmed Senoussi	Athletics
111	Czechoslovakia	Tschechoslowakei	Ludvík Daněk	Athletics
112	Turkey	Türkei	Gıyasettin Yılmaz	Wrestling
113	Tunisia	Tunesien	Salem Boughattas	Athletics
114	Soviet Union	UdSSR (Note: UdSSR - Union der Sozialistischen Sowjetrepubliken)	Aleksandr Medved	Wrestling
115	Uganda	Uganda	John Akii-Bua	Athletics
116	Hungary	Ungarn	Gergely Kulcsár	Athletics
117	Uruguay	Uruguay	Darwin Piñeyrúa	Athletics
118	United States of America	USA (Note: USA (frequent acronym in German) - in full as Vereinigte Staaten von Amerika)	Olga Fikotová	Athletics
119	Venezuela	Venezuela	Francisco Rodríguez	Boxing
120	Vietnam	Vietnam	Hồ Minh Thu	Archery
121	Federal Republic of Germany	Deutschland	Detlef Lewe	Canoeing
