= Soviet Union at the 1972 Summer Olympics =

- Flag of the Soviet Union
- IOC code: URS
- NOC: Soviet Olympic Committee

in Munich, West Germany 26 August 1972 – 10 September 1972
- Competitors: 371 (298 men, 73 women) in 22 sports
- Flag bearer: Aleksandr Medved
- Medals Ranked 1st: Gold 50 Silver 27 Bronze 22 Total 99

Summer Olympics appearances (overview)
- 1952; 1956; 1960; 1964; 1968; 1972; 1976; 1980; 1984; 1988

Other related appearances
- Russian Empire (1900–1912); Estonia (1920–1936, 1992–pres.); Latvia (1924–1936, 1992–pres.); Lithuania (1924–1928, 1992–pres.); Unified Team (1992); Armenia (1994–pres.); Belarus (1994–2020); Georgia (1994–pres.); Kazakhstan (1994–pres.); Kyrgyzstan (1994–pres.); Moldova (1994–pres.); Russia (1994–2016); Ukraine (1994–pres.); Uzbekistan (1994–pres.); Azerbaijan (1996–pres.); Tajikistan (1996–pres.); Turkmenistan (1996–pres.); ROC (2020); Individual Neutral Athletes (2024)

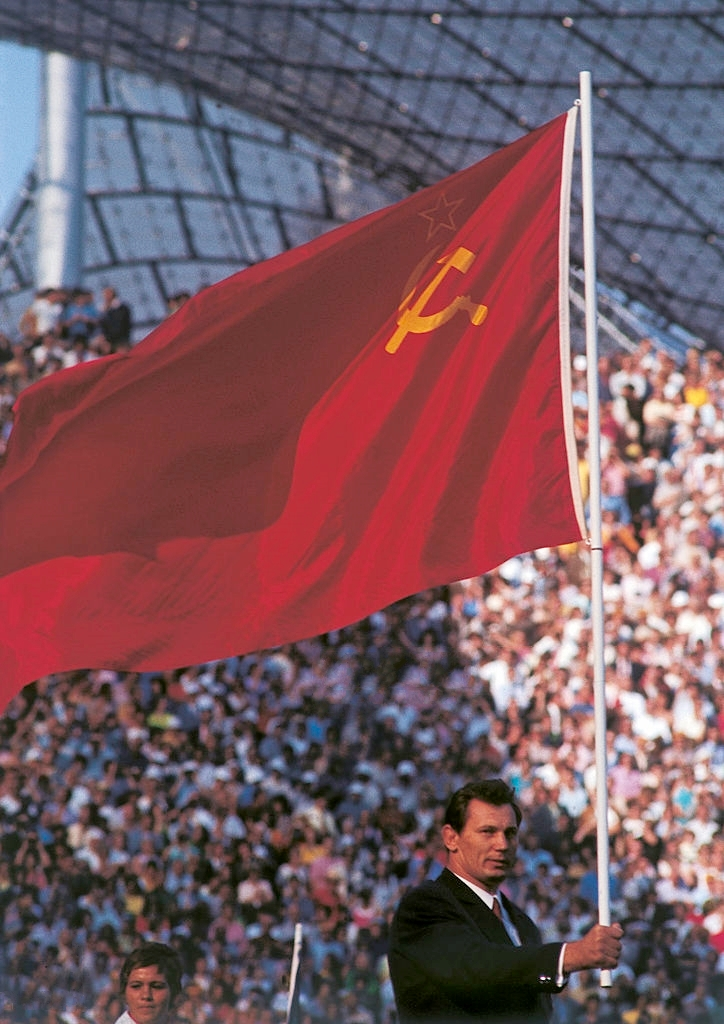
Aleksandr Medved, flag bearer of Soviet Union at the 1972 Summer Olympics opening ceremony

The Soviet Union (USSR) competed at the 1972 Summer Olympics in Munich, West Germany. 371 competitors, 298 men and 73 women, took part in 180 events in 22 sports.

The Soviet Union won 50 gold medals in the year, when the fiftieth anniversary of the USSR's founding was celebrated in the country. That fact pleased the Soviet authorities.

== Medalists ==
The USSR finished first in the final medal rankings, with 50 gold and 99 total medals.

=== Gold ===
==== Athletics ====
- Mykola Avilov — men's decathlon
- Anatoliy Bondarchuk — men's hammer throw
- Valeriy Borzov — men's 100 metres
- Valeriy Borzov — men's 200 metres
- Lyudmila Bragina — women's 1500 metres
- Nadezhda Chizhova — women's shot put
- Faina Melnik — women's discus throw
- Viktor Saneyev — men's triple jump
- Jüri Tarmak — men's high jump

==== Basketball ====
- Alzhan Zharmukhamedov, Zurab Sakandelidze, Gennady Volnov, Ivan Yedeshko, Sergei Kovalenko, Modestas Paulauskas, Anatoly Polivoda, Ivan Dvornyi, Mikheil Korkia, Aleksandr Belov, Sergey Belov and Aleksandr Boloshev — men's team competition.

==== Boxing ====
- Boris Kuznetsov — men's featherweight
- Vyacheslav Lemeshev — men's 71–75 kg

==== Canoeing ====
- Aleksandr Shaparenko — men's K1 1000m kayak singles
- Yuliya Ryabchynskaya — women's K1 500m kayak singles
- Nikolai Gorbachev and Viktor Kratasyuk — men's K2 1000m kayak pairs
- Yekaterina Kuryshko and Lyudmila Pinayeva-Khvedosyuk — women's K2 500m kayak pairs
- Vladas Česiūnas and Yury Lobanov — men's C2 1000m Canadian pairs
- Yury Stetsenko, Valery Didenko, Yury Filatov and Vladimir Morozov — men's K4 1000m kayak fours

==== Cycling ====
- Valery Yardy, Gennady Komnatov, Valery Likhachov and Boris Shukov — men's team road race
- Vladimir Semenets and Igor Tselovalnykov — men's 2000m tandem

==== Diving ====
- Vladimir Vasin — men's springboard

==== Equestrian ====
- Yelena Petushkova, Pepel, Ivan Kalita, Ikhor, Ivan Kizimov, Tarif — dressage team

==== Fencing ====
- Viktor Sidyak — men's sabre individual
- Svetlana Tširkova, Alexandra Zabelina, Yelena Belova-Novikova, Galina Gorokhova and Tatyana Samusenko-Petrenko — women's foil team

==== Gymnastics ====
- Viktor Klimenko — men's pommel horse
- Nikolay Andrianov — men's floor exercises
- Lyudmila Turishcheva — women's all-around individual
- Olga Korbut — women's balance beam
- Olga Korbut — women's floor exercises
- Tamara Lazakovich, Elvira Saadi, Lyudmila Turishcheva, Lyubov Burda, Olga Korbut and Antonina Koshel — women's team combined exercises

==== Judo ====
- Shota Chochishvili — men's half-heavyweight (93 kg)

==== Modern pentathlon ====
- Pavel Lednev, Boris Onyshchenko and Vladimir Shmelyov — men's team competition

==== Rowing ====
Men's single sculls – 1st place ( gold medal)

- Yury Malyshev

Men's double sculls – 1st place ( gold medal)

- Gennadi Korshikov
- Aleksandr Timoshinin

==== Sailing ====
- Vitaly Dyrdyra and Valentyn Mankin — men's tempest class

==== Shooting ====
- Yakov Zheleznyak — men's running game target

==== Volleyball ====
- Nina Smoleyeva, Tatyana Tretyakova-Ponyaeva, Lyubov Tyurina, Inna Ryskal, Roza Salikhova, Tatyana Sarycheva, Tatyana Gonobobleva, Natalya Kudreva, Galina Leontyeva, Lyudmila Borozna, Lyudmila Buldakova and Vera Duyunova-Galushka — women's team competition

==== Water polo ====
- Viacheslav Sobchenko, Vladimir Zhmudsky, Nikolay Melnikov, Leonid Osipov, Aleksandr Shidlovsky, Aleksandr Dreval, Vadim Gulyaev, Aleksandr Kabanov, Anatoly Akimov, Aleksey Barkalov and Aleksandr Dolgushin — men's team competition

==== Weightlifting ====
- Mukharby Kirzhinov — men's lightweight
- Jaan Talts — men's heavyweight
- Vasily Alekseyev — men's super heavyweight

==== Wrestling ====
- Rustem Kazakov — men's Greco-Roman bantamweight
- Shamil Khisamutdinov — men's Greco-Roman lightweight
- Valery Rezantsev — men's Greco-Roman light heavyweight
- Anatoly Roshchin — men's Greco-Roman super heavyweight
- Roman Dimitriyev — men's freestyle light flyweight
- Zagalav Abdulbekov — men's freestyle featherweight
- Levan Tediashvili — men's freestyle middleweight
- Ivan Yarygin — men's freestyle heavyweight
- Aleksandr Medved — men's freestyle super heavyweight

=== Silver ===
==== Athletics ====
- Yevgeny Arzhanov — men's 800 metres
- Valeriy Borzov, Aleksandr Kornelyuk, Vladimir Lovetskiy and Juris Silovs — men's 4 × 100 m relay
- Vladimir Golubnichy — men's 20 km walk
- Leonid Lytvynenko — men's decathlon
- Jānis Lūsis — men's javelin throw
- Veniamin Soldatenko — men's 50 km walk
- Nijole Sabaite — women's 800 metres

==== Equestrian ====
- Yelena Petushkova, her horse Pepel — dressage individual

==== Fencing ====
- Leonid Romanov, Vasily Stankovich, Vladimir Denisov, Anatoly Koteshev and Viktor Putyatin — men's foil team
- Viktor Sidyak, Eduard Vinokurov, Viktor Bazhenov, Vladimir Nazlymov and Mark Rakita — men's sabre team

==== Gymnastics ====
- Viktor Klimenko — men's long horse vault
- Mikhail Voronin — men's rings
- Eduard Mikaelyan, Vladimir Shchukin, Mikhail Voronin, Viktor Klimenko, Nikolay Andrianov and Aleksandr Maleyev — men's team combined exercises
- Olga Korbut — women's asymmetrical bars
- Tamara Lazakovich — women's balance beam
- Lyudmila Turishcheva — women's floor exercises

==== Judo ====
- Vitali Kuznetsov — men's open class

==== Modern pentathlon ====
- Boris Onyshchenko — men's individual competition

==== Shooting ====
- Yevgeni Petrov — men's skeet shooting
- Boris Melnik — men's free rifle, three positions

==== Swimming ====
- Viktor Mazanov, Viktor Aboimov, Vladimir Bure and Igor Grivennikov — men's 4 × 100 m freestyle
- Galina Stepanova-Prozumenshchykova — women's 100m breaststroke

==== Weightlifting ====
- Dito Shanidze — men's featherweight

==== Wrestling ====
- Anatoly Nazarenko — men's Greco-Roman middleweight
- Nikolay Yakovenko — men's Greco-Roman heavyweight
- Arsen Alakhverdiyev — men's freestyle flyweight
- Gennady Strakhov — men's freestyle light heavyweight

=== Bronze ===
==== Archery ====
- Emma Gaptchenko — women's individual competition

==== Athletics ====
- Vasily Khmelevski — men's hammer throw

==== Cycling ====
- Omar Pkhakadze — men's 1000m sprint (scratch)

==== Fencing ====
- Vladimir Nazlymov — men's sabre individual
- Galina Gorokhova — women's foil individual
- Igor Valetov, Georgi Zažitski, Grigory Kriss, Viktor Modzalevsky and Sergey Paramonov — men's épée team

==== Football (soccer) ====
- Gennady Yevryuzhikhin, Oganes Zanazanyan, Vyacheslav Semyonov, Andrei Yakubik, Yury Yeliseyev, Vladimir Pilguy, Yevgeny Rudakov, Yozhef Sabo, Yevgeny Lovchev, Sergei Olshansky, Vladimir Onishchenko, Viktor Kolotov, Anatoly Kuksov, Yury Istomin, Vladimir Kaplichnyi, Murtaz Khurtsilava, Arkady Andriasyan, Oleg Blokhin and Revaz Dzodzuashvili — men's team competition

==== Gymnastics ====
- Nikolay Andrianov — men's long horse vault
- Tamara Lazakovich — women's all-around individual
- Lyudmila Turishcheva — women's side horse vault
- Tamara Lazakovich — women's floor exercises

==== Judo ====
- Anatoly Novikov — men's half middleweight (70 kg)
- Givi Onashvili — men's heavyweight (>100 kg)

==== Modern pentathlon ====
- Pavel Lednev — men's individual competition

==== Sailing ====
- Viktor Potapov — men's Finn class

==== Shooting ====
- Viktor Torshin — men's rapid-fire pistol

==== Swimming ====
- Vladimir Bure — men's 100m freestyle
- Viktor Mazanov, Vladimir Bure, Igor Grivennikov and Georgi Kulikov — men's 4 × 200 m freestyle
- Galina Stepanova-Prozumenshchykova — women's 200m breaststroke

==== Volleyball ====
- Aleksandr Saprykin, Yury Starunsky, Leonid Zayko, Vladimir Patkin, Yury Poyarkov, Vladimir Putyatov, Vladimir Kondra, Valery Kravchenko, Yevgeny Lapinsky, Viktor Borshch, Yefim Chulak and Vyatcheslav Domanyi — men's team competition

==== Weightlifting ====
- Gennady Chetin — men's bantamweight

==== Wrestling ====
- Ruslan Ashuraliyev — men's freestyle lightweight

== Results by event ==
=== Archery ===
Women's individual competition:

- Emma Gaptchenko — 2403 points (→ Bronze medal)
- Keto Lossaberidze — 2402 points (→ 4th place)
- Alla Peunova — 2364 points (→ 8th place)

Men's individual competition:

- Victor Sidorouk — 2427 points (→ 7th place)
- Mikhail Peounov 2397 points (→ 12th place)
- Mati Vaikjärv — 2363 points (→ 24th place)

=== Athletics ===
Men's 100 metres

- Vladimir Atamas

- First heat — 10.51s (→ did not advance)

Men's 800 metres

- Yevgeny Arzhanov → Silver medal

- Heat — 1:48.3
- Semifinals — 1:46.3
- Final — 1:45.9

- Ivan Ivanov

- Heat — 1:51.0
- Semifinals — 1:49.6 (→ did not advance)

- Yevgeni Volkov

- Heat — 1:48.6
- Semifinals — 1:50.1 (→ did not advance)

Men's 1,500 metres

- Volodymyr Panteley

- Heat — 3:42.3
- Semifinals — 3:41.6
- Final — 3:40.2 (→ 8th place)

- Yevgeny Arzhanov

- Heat — DNS (→ did not advance)

- Ivan Ivanov

- Heat — 3:42.3 (→ did not advance)

Men's 5000 metres

- Nikola Puklakov

- Heat — 13:57.6 (→ did not advance)

- Vladimir Afonin

- Heat — 14:08.6 (→ did not advance)

Men's 4 × 100 m relay

- Aleksandr Kornelyuk, Vladimir Lovetskiy, Juris Silovs and Valeriy Borzov

- Heat — 39.15s
- Semifinals — 39.00s
- Final — 38.50s (→ Silver medal)

Men's high jump

- Jüri Tarmak

- Qualifying round — 2.15m
- Final — 2.23m (→ Gold medal)

- Rustam Akhmetov

- Qualifying round — 2.15m
- Final — 2.15m (→ 8th place)

- Kestusis Shapka

- Qualifying round — 2.15m
- Final — 2.15m (→ 12th place)

Women's javelin throw

- Svetlana Korolyova

- Qualifying round — 55.90 m
- Final — 56.36 m (→ 8th place)

=== Basketball ===
Men's team competition

- Preliminary round (group B)

- Defeated Senegal (94–52)
- Defeated West Germany (87–63)
- Defeated Italy (79–66)
- Defeated Poland (94–64)
- Defeated Puerto Rico (100–87)
- Defeated Philippines (111–80)
- Defeated Yugoslavia (74–67)

- Semifinals

- Defeated Cuba (67–60)

- Final

- Defeated United States (51–50) → Gold medal

=== Boxing ===
Men's light middleweight (– 71 kg)

- Valeri Tregubov

- First round — bye
- Second round — defeated Reggie Jones (USA), 3:2
- Third round — lost to Alan Minter (GBR), 0:5

Men's heavyweight (+ 81 kg)

- Yuri Nesterov

- First round — lost to Duane Bobick (USA), 0:5

=== Cycling ===
Fifteen cyclists represented the Soviet Union in 1972.

Individual road race

- Valery Likhachov — 34th place
- Anatoly Starkov — 35th place
- Valery Yardy — did not finish (→ no ranking)
- Ivan Trifonov — did not finish (→ no ranking)

Team time trial

- Boris Shukhov
- Valery Yardy
- Gennady Komnatov
- Valery Likhachov

Sprint

- Omar Pkhak'adze
- Serhiy Kravtsov

1000m time trial

- Eduard Rapp

- Final — 1:07.73 (→ 8th place)

Tandem

- Igor Tselovalnikov and Vladimir Semenets — Gold medal

Team pursuit

- Viktor Bykov
- Vladimir Kuznetsov
- Anatoly Stepanenko
- Aleksandr Yudin

=== Diving ===
Men's 3m springboard

- Vladimir Vasin – 594.09 points (gold medal)
- Viacheslav Strahov – 556.20 points (6th place)
- Vladimir Kapirulin – 329.46 points (18th place)

Men's 10m platform

- David Ambarzumian – 463.56 points (5th place)
- Vladimir Kapirullin – 459.21 points (7th place)
- Aleksander Gendrikson – 431.04 points (12th place)

Women's 3m springboard

- Natalia Kusnecova – 258.45 points (14th place)
- Tatjana Shtyreva – 252.42 points (16th place)
- Tamara Safonova – 252.09 points (17th place)

Women's 10m platform

- Alla Seiina – 314.76 points (10th place)
- Natalia Kuznecova – 184.02 points (13th place)
- Tatjana Shtyreva – 177.33 points (19th place)

=== Fencing ===
20 fencers, 15 men and 5 women, represented the Soviet Union in 1972.

Men's foil

- Vladimir Denisov
- Anatoly Koteshev
- Vasyl Stankovych

Men's team foil

- Vasyl Stankovych, Viktor Putyatin, Anatoly Koteshev, Vladimir Denisov, Leonid Romanov

Men's épée

- Igor Valetov
- Sergey Paramonov
- Grigory Kriss

Men's team épée

- Grigory Kriss, Viktor Modzalevsky, Georgi Zažitski, Sergey Paramonov, Igor Valetov

Men's sabre

- Viktor Sidyak
- Vladimir Nazlymov
- Mark Rakita

Men's team sabre

- Mark Rakita, Viktor Sidyak, Vladimir Nazlymov, Eduard Vinokurov, Viktor Bazhenov

Women's foil

- Galina Gorokhova
- Yelena Novikova-Belova
- Aleksandra Zabelina

Women's team foil

- Yelena Novikova-Belova, Galina Gorokhova, Aleksandra Zabelina, Svetlana Tširkova, Tatyana Petrenko-Samusenko

=== Handball ===
Men's team competition

The Soviet team came away from the three-game opening round with no losses, but only one win. Ties with Denmark and Sweden and a win over Poland put the Soviet Union in a tie with Sweden at the top of the division. Since both teams moved on to the second round, the fact that Sweden won the tie-breaker mattered little. The Soviets' hopes were high after the first game of the second round, a win over East Germany that put the team on top of the division. However, their subsequent loss to Czechoslovakia dropped them to third in the group. This meant that they played in a game for fifth and sixth place against host nation West Germany. Their win was little consolation for being eliminated from medal contention.

Men's team competition:

- Soviet Union – 5th place (3–1–2)
- Team roster

- Nikolai Semenov
- Mikhail Ischenko
- Aleksandr Panov
- Vladimir Maksimov
- Valentin Kulev
- Vasili Ilyin
- Anatoli Shevchenko
- Yuri Klimov
- Mikhail Luzenko
- Alexander Resanov
- Valeri Gassi
- Albert Oganesov
- Yan Vilson
- Yuri Lagutin
- Ivan Usaty

=== Modern pentathlon ===
Three male pentathletes represented the Soviet Union in 1972.

Men's individual competition

- Boris Onishenko — 5335 pts (→ Silver medal)
- Pavel Lednev — 5328 pts (→ Bronze medal)
- Vladimir Shmelev — 5302 pts (→ 5th place)

Men's team competition

- Onishenko, Lednev and Shmelev — 15968 pts (→ Gold medal)

=== Rowing ===
The Soviet Union had 26 male rowers participate in all seven rowing events in 1972.

Men's single sculls

- Yury Malyshev

- Heat — 7:42.67
- Semifinals — 8:13.49
- Final — 7:10.12 (→ Gold medal)

Men's coxless pair – 8th place

- Vladimir Polyakov
- Nikolay Vasilyev

Men's coxed pair

- Vladimir Eshinov, Nikolay Ivanov and Yuriy Lorentsson

- Heat — 7:43.84
- Semifinals — 8:07.34
- Final — 7:24.44 (→ 5th place)

Men's coxless four – 4th place

- Anatoly Tkachuk
- Igor Kashurov
- Aleksandr Motin
- Vitaly Sapronov

Men's coxed four – 4th place

- Volodymyr Sterlik
- Vladimir Solovyov
- Aleksandr Lyubaturov
- Yury Shamayev
- Igor Rudakov

Men's eight – 4th place

- Aleksandr Ryazankin
- Viktor Dementyev
- Sergey Kolyaskin
- Aleksandr Shitov
- Valery Bisarnov
- Boris Vorobyov
- Vladimir Savelov
- Aleksandr Martyshkin
- Viktor Mikheyev

=== Shooting ===
Fourteen male shooters represented the Soviet Union in 1972. Yakiv Zhelezniak won gold, Boris Melnik and Yevgeny Petrov won silvers and Viktor Torshin won a bronze medal.

25 m pistol

- Viktor Torshin
- Igor Bakalov

50 m pistol

- Grigory Kosykh
- Vladimir Stolypin

300 m rifle, three positions

- Boris Melnik
- Valentin Kornev

50 m rifle, three positions

- Vladimir Agishev
- Vitaly Parkhimovich

50 m rifle, prone

- Vitaly Parkhimovich
- Valentin Kornev

50 m running target

- Yakiv Zhelezniak
- Valerii Postoyanov

Trap

- Aleksandr Alipov
- Aleksandr Androshkin

Skeet

- Yevgeny Petrov
- Yury Tsuranov

=== Swimming ===
Men's 100m freestyle

- Vladimir Bure

- Heat — 52.87s
- Semifinals — 52.60s
- Final — 51.77s (→ Bronze medal)

- Igor Grivennikov

- Heat — 53.64s
- Semifinals — 53.55s
- Final — 52.44s (→ 6th place)

- Georgi Kulikov

- Heat — 53.78s
- Semifinals — 53.68s (→ did not advance)

Men's 200m freestyle

- Vladimir Bure

- Heat — 1:56.15
- Final — 1:57.24 (→ 7th place)

- Viktor Mazanov

- Heat — 1:57.92 (→ did not advance)

- Georgi Kulikov

- Heat — 1:57.04 (→ did not advance)

Men's 4 × 100 m freestyle relay

- Vladimir Bure, Viktor Mazanov, Viktor Aboimov and Georgy Kulikov

- Heat — 3:32.72

- Vladimir Bure, Viktor Mazanov, Viktor Aboimov and Igor Grivennikov

- Final — 3:29.72 (→ Silver medal)

Men's 4 × 200 m freestyle relay

- Viktor Aboimov, Alexsandr Samsonov, Viktor Mazanov and Georgi Kulikov

- Heat — 7:51.44

- Igor Grivennikov, Viktor Mazanov, Georgi Kulikov and Vladimir Bure

- Final — 7:45.76 (→ Bronze medal)

=== Volleyball ===
Men's team competition

- Preliminary round (group A)

- Defeated Tunisia (3–0)
- Defeated South Korea (3–0)
- Defeated Bulgaria (3–1)
- Defeated Czechoslovakia (3–0)
- Defeated Poland (3–2)

- Semifinals

- Lost to East Germany (1–3)

- Bronze medal match

- Defeated Bulgaria (3–0) → Bronze medal

- Team roster

- Viktor Borsch
- Vyacheslav Domany
- Vladimir Patkyn
- Leonid Zayko
- Yuri Starunsky
- Alex Saprikyne
- Vladimir Kondra
- Elim Chulak
- Vladimir Poutyatov
- Valery Kravchenko
- Yevgeny Lapinsky
- Yuri Poyarkov

== Medals by republic ==
In the following table for team events number of team representatives, who received medals are counted, not "one medal for all the team", as usual. Because there were people from different republics in one team.

Rank	Republic	Gold	Silver	Bronze	Total
1	Russian SFSR	60	22	20	102
2	Ukrainian SSR	20	7	9	36
3	Byelorussian SSR	10	6	2	18
4	Georgian SSR	6	1	3	10
5	Uzbek SSR	3	0	0	3
6	Lithuanian SSR	2	1	0	3
7	Kazakh SSR	1	3	2	6
8	Armenian SSR	1	1	2	4
9	Azerbaijan SSR	1	1	0	2
10	Estonian SSR	1	0	1	2
11	Tajik SSR	1	0	0	1
12	Latvian SSR	0	2	1	3
Totals (12 entries)		106	44	40	190

== Top 5 sports societies ==
In the following table for team events number of team representatives, who received medals are counted, not "one medal for all the team", as usual. Because there were people from different sports societies in one team.

Pos	Sports society	Gold	Silver	Bronze	Total
1	Armed Forces	33	18	18	69
2	Dynamo	28	10	16	54
3	VSS Burevestnik	11	6	5	22
4	VSS Spartak	9	3	3	15
5	VSS Trud	7	1	1	9

== Bibliography ==
- A. Dobrov (1973). XX Summer Olympic Games. Year 1972 (in Russian). Moscow: Fizkultura i sport.
