= Sweden at the 1972 Summer Olympics =

- IOC code: SWE
- NOC: Swedish Olympic Committee

in Munich
- Competitors: 131 (104 men and 27 women) in 18 sports
- Flag bearer: Jan Jönsson
- Medals Ranked 11th: Gold 4 Silver 6 Bronze 6 Total 16

Summer Olympics appearances (overview)
- 1896; 1900; 1904; 1908; 1912; 1920; 1924; 1928; 1932; 1936; 1948; 1952; 1956; 1960; 1964; 1968; 1972; 1976; 1980; 1984; 1988; 1992; 1996; 2000; 2004; 2008; 2012; 2016; 2020; 2024

Other related appearances
- 1906 Intercalated Games

Sweden competed at the 1972 Summer Olympics in Munich, West Germany. 131 competitors, 104 men and 27 women, took part in 90 events in 18 sports.

== Medalists ==
=== Gold ===
- Ulrika Knape — Diving, Women's 10m Platform
- Ragnar Skanåker — Shooting, Men's Free Pistol
- Gunnar Larsson — Swimming, Men's 200m Individual Medley
- Gunnar Larsson — Swimming, Men's 400m Individual Medley

=== Silver ===
- Gunnar Jervill — Archery, Men's Individual Competition
- Ulrika Knape — Diving, Women's 3m Springboard
- Rolf Peterson — Canoeing, Men's K1 1000m
- Jan Karlsson — Wrestling, Men's Freestyle Welterweight
- Pelle Pettersson and Stellan Westerdahl — Sailing, Men's Star Class
- Bo Knape, Stefan Krook, Lennart Roslund and Stig Wennerström — Sailing, Men's Soling Class

=== Bronze ===
- Rickard Bruch — Athletics, Men's Discus Throw
- Hasse Thomsén — Boxing, Men's Heavyweight
- Jan Jönsson — Equestrian, Three-Day Event Individual competition
- Ulla Håkanson, Ninna Swaab and Maud von Rosen — Equestrian, Dressage Team Competition
- Hans Bettembourg — Weightlifting, Men's Middle Heavyweight
- Jan Karlsson — Wrestling, Men's Greco-Roman Welterweight

== Archery ==
In the first modern archery competition at the Olympics, Sweden entered three men and two women. Gunnar Jervill won a silver medal in the men's competition.

Men's Individual Competition:

- Gunnar Jervill – 2481 points (→ Silver Medal)
- Rolf Svensson – 2386 points (→ 16th place)
- Olov Bostroem – 2347 points (→ 27th place)

Women's Individual Competition:

- Maj-Britt Johansson – 2283 points (→ 19th place)
- Anna-Lisa Berglund – 2185 points (→ 34th place)

== Athletics ==
Men's 1500 metres

- Gunnar Ekman

- Heat — 3:40.4
- Semifinals — 3:39.4 (→ did not advance)

- Ulf Hogberg

- Heat — 3:41.5
- Semifinals — 3:43.6 (→ did not advance)

Men's 5000 metres

- Anders Gärderud

- Heat — 13:57.2 (→ did not advance)

Men's High Jump

- Jan Dahlgren

- Qualifying Round — 2.15m
- Final — 2.15m (→ 11th place)

== Boxing ==
Men's Heavyweight (+ 81 kg)

- Hasse Thomsén → Bronze Medal

- First Round — Defeated Jean Bassomben (CMR), 4:1
- Quarterfinals — Defeated Carroll Morgan (CAN), KO-3
- Semifinals — Lost to Ion Alexe (ROM), TKO-2

== Cycling ==
Five cyclists represented Sweden in 1972.

Individual road race

- Lennart Fagerlund — 42nd place
- Sven-Åke Nilsson — 44th place
- Leif Hansson — did not finish (→ no ranking)
- Bernt Johansson — did not finish (→ no ranking)

Team time trial

- Lennart Fagerlund
- Tord Filipsson
- Leif Hansson
- Sven-Åke Nilsson

== Diving ==
Women's 3m Springboard

- Ulrika Knape — 434.19 points (→ Silver Medal)
- Agneta Henriksson — 417.48 points (→ 6th place)

Women's 10m Platform

- Ulrika Knape — 390.00 points (→ Gold Medal)

== Fencing ==
Six fencers, five men and one woman, represented Sweden in 1972.

Men's foil

- Per Sundberg

Men's épée

- Rolf Edling
- Orvar Jönsson
- Carl von Essen

Men's team épée

- Hans Wieselgren, Carl von Essen, Orvar Jönsson, Rolf Edling, Per Sundberg

Women's foil

- Kerstin Palm

== Handball ==
Summary

Key:

- ET: After extra time
- P – Match decided by penalty-shootout.

Team	Event	Preliminary Round				Second Round			Final / BM / Pl.	
Team	Event	Opposition Score	Opposition Score	Opposition Score	Rank	Opposition Score	Opposition Score	Rank	Opposition Score	Rank
Sweden men's	Men's tournament	Poland; D 13–13	Soviet Union; D 11–11	Denmark; W 16–10	1 Q	Czechoslovakia; L 12–15	East Germany; L 11–14	4	Hungary; W 19–18	7

Men's Team Competition

In a very tight division for the first round, Sweden came out in first place after a tie-breaker with the Soviet Union. Both teams had tied twice (Sweden had tied Poland and the Soviet Union) and won once. Sweden's victory was over Denmark. Both teams advanced to the second round with a 0-0-1 record to start, already behind East Germany which had defeated Czechoslovakia to enter with a 1-0-0 record. Sweden lost its games to those two opponents while the Soviet Union split its pair, dropping the Swedes to fourth place in the division. They played against Hungary for seventh and eighth places, winning 19-18.

- Preliminary Round (Group A)

- Sweden – Poland 13-13 (5-7)
- Sweden – Soviet Union 11-11 (4-3)
- Sweden – Denmark 16-10 (8-4)

- Second Round (Group A)

- Sweden – Czechoslovakia 12-15 (6-7)
- Sweden – East Germany 11-14 (6-8)

- Classification Match

- Sweden – Hungary 19-18 (11-8) → 7th place

- Team Roster

- Björn Andersson
- Bo Andersson
- Dan Eriksson
- Lennart Eriksson
- Johan Fischerström
- Göran Hård af Segerstad
- Bengt Johansson
- Benny Johansson
- Jan Jönsson
- Lars Karlsson
- Michael Koch
- Olle Olsson
- Sten Olsson
- Thomas Persson
- Bertil Söderberg
- Frank Ström

== Modern pentathlon ==
Three male pentathletes represented Sweden in 1972.

Men's Individual Competition:

- Björn Ferm – 5283 points (→ 6th place)
- Bo Jansson – 4739 points (→ 24th place)
- Hans-Gunnar Liljenwall – 4704 points (→ 25th place)

Men's Team Competition:

- Ferm, Jansson, and Liljenwall – 14708 points (→ 5th place)

== Rowing ==
Men's Single Sculls

- Lennart Baiter

- Heat — 8:12.92
- Repechage — 8:11.07 (→ did not advance)

== Shooting ==
Ten male shooters represented Sweden in 1972. Ragnar Skanåker won gold in the 50 m pistol event.

25 m pistol

- Curt Andersson

50 m pistol

- Ragnar Skanåker
- Kjell Jacobsson

300 m rifle, three positions

- Sven Johansson

50 m rifle, three positions

- Christer Jansson
- Sven Johansson

50 m rifle, prone

- Christer Jansson
- Sven Johansson

50 m running target

- Göte Gåård
- Karl-Axel Karlsson

Trap

- Johnny Påhlsson

Skeet

- Lars-Erik Söderberg
- Gert-Åke Bengtsson

== Swimming ==
Men's 100m Freestyle

- Anders Bellbring

- Heat — DNS (→ did not advance)

Men's 200m Freestyle

- Bernt Zarnowiecki

- Heat — 2:01.34 (→ did not advance)

- Rolf Pettersson

- Heat — 2:00.02 (→ did not advance)

- Hans Ljungberg

- Heat — 1:59.42 (→ did not advance)

Men's 4 × 200 m Freestyle Relay

- Hans Ljungberg, Bengt Gingsjö, Anders Bellbring, and Gunnar Larsson

- Heat — 7:57.54

- Bengt Gingsjö, Hans Ljungberg, Anders Bellbring, and Gunnar Larsson

- Final — 7:47.37 (→ 4th place)
