= Shooting at the 1972 Summer Olympics =

Shooting at the Games of the XX Olympiad
- Dates: 27 August–2 September 1972

Shooting at the 1972 Summer Olympics in Munich comprised eight events. The running target event was re-added to the programme, after last appearing in 1956. The events were held between 27 August and 2 September 1972. All events were mixed, meaning both men and women were allowed to compete in the same events, against each other. Four women competed in these games.

== Events ==
Event	Gold	Silver	Bronze
pistol	Ragnar Skanåker (SWE)	Dan Iuga (ROU)	Rudolf Dollinger (AUT)
rapid fire pistol	Józef Zapędzki (POL)	Ladislav Falta (TCH)	Viktor Torshin (URS)
running target	Yakov Zheleznyak (URS)	Helmut Bellingrodt (COL)	John Kynoch (GBR)
rifle prone	Ri Ho-jun (PRK)	Vic Auer (USA)	Nicolae Rotaru (ROU)
rifle three positions	John Writer (USA)	Lanny Bassham (USA)	Werner Lippoldt (GDR)
300 metre free rifle three positions	Lones Wigger (USA)	Boris Melnik (URS)	Lajos Papp (HUN)
skeet	Konrad Wirnhier (FRG)	Yevgeni Petrov (URS)	Michael Buchheim (GDR)
trap	Angelo Scalzone (ITA)	Michel Carrega (FRA)	Silvano Basagni (ITA)

== Participating nations ==
A total of 397 shooters, 393 men and 4 women, from 71 nations competed at the Munich Games:

- Albania (4)
- Argentina (5)
- Australia (4)
- Austria (7)
- Barbados (2)
- Belgium (6)
- Bolivia (6)
- British Honduras (1)
- Brazil (4)
- Bulgaria (5)
- Canada (10)
- Ceylon (1)
- Chile (2)
- Republic of China (1)
- Colombia (10)
- Costa Rica (1)
- Cuba (8)
- Czechoslovakia (8)
- Denmark (7)
- Dominican Republic (2)
- East Germany (9)
- El Salvador (4)
- Finland (10)
- France (13)
- Great Britain (14)
- Greece (5)
- Guatemala (1)
- Hong Kong (1)
- Hungary (9)
- India (4)
- Ireland (4)
- Israel (2)
- Italy (11)
- Japan (6)
- Kenya (9)
- Lebanon (4)
- Liechtenstein (2)
- Luxembourg (1)
- Malaysia (1)
- Malta (1)
- Mexico (10)
- Monaco (4)
- Mongolia (4)
- Netherlands (3)
- Netherlands Antilles (1)
- New Zealand (4)
- Norway (7)
- North Korea (3)
- Paraguay (1)
- Peru (2)
- Philippines (8)
- Poland (13)
- Portugal (5)
- Puerto Rico (8)
- Romania (10)
- San Marino (6)
- South Korea (5)
- Soviet Union (14)
- Spain (9)
- Swaziland (1)
- Sweden (10)
- Switzerland (8)
- Syria (2)
- Thailand (10)
- Turkey (4)
- United States (14)
- Virgin Islands (6)
- Venezuela (2)
- Vietnam (2)
- West Germany (14)
- Yugoslavia (2)

== Medal count ==
Rank	Nation	Gold	Silver	Bronze	Total
1	United States	2	2	0	4
2	Soviet Union	1	2	1	4
3	Italy	1	0	1	2
4	North Korea	1	0	0	1
4	Poland	1	0	0	1
4	Sweden	1	0	0	1
4	West Germany	1	0	0	1
8	Romania	0	1	1	2
9	Colombia	0	1	0	1
9	Czechoslovakia	0	1	0	1
9	France	0	1	0	1
12	East Germany	0	0	2	2
13	Austria	0	0	1	1
13	Great Britain	0	0	1	1
13	Hungary	0	0	1	1
Totals (15 entries)		8	8	8	24
