= 1963 European Running Target Championships =

- Host city: Sandviken, Sweden
- Level: Senior
- Events: 6 men (3 individual + 3 team)

The 1963 European Running Target Championships was the 1st edition of the running target competition, European Running Target Championships, organised by the International Shooting Sport Federation.

== Results ==
=== Men ===
Event	Gold		Silver		Bronze	
Event	Athletes	Pts	Athletes	Pts	Athletes	Pts
50 m running target	(Sweden) Rune Flodman	167	(Soviet Union) Igor Nesterov	152	(Finland) Pekka Kling	151
50 m running target, team	Soviet Union; Igor Nikitzhin; Valery Staratelev; Vladimir Veselov; Igor Nesterov		Finland; Pekka Kling; Seppo Penkkimäki; Matti Säteri; Heikki Yrjövuori		Sweden; Hans Eriksson; Rune Flodman; Stig Johansson; Karl-Axel Karlsson	
100 m running deer single shot, men	(Soviet Union) Oleg Sukurenkov	227	(Sweden) Pekka Kling	226	(Soviet Union) Oleg Sukurenkov	224
100 m running deer single shot, team	Soviet Union; Igor Nikitzhin; Valery Staratelyev; Vladimir Veselov; Oleg Sakurenkov		Finland; Pekka Kling; Seppo Penkkimäki; Matti Säteri; Heikki Yrjöuori		Sweden; Hans Eriksson; Rune Flodman; Hakan Halvardsson; Stig Johansson	
100 m running deer double shot, men	(Soviet Union) Oleg Sukurenkov	233	(Finland) Pekka Kling	227	(Soviet Union) Valery Staratelev	220
100 m running deer double shot, team	Soviet Union; Igor Nikitzhin; Valery Staratelyev; Vladimir Veselov; Oleg Sakurenkov		Finland; Pekka Kling; Seppo Penkkimäki; Matti Säteri; Heikki Yrjövuori		Sweden; Hans Eriksson; Rune Flodman; Hakan Halvardsson; Stig Johansson	

== Medal table ==
Host country

#	Country	1st place, gold medalist(s)	2nd place, silver medalist(s)	3rd place, bronze medalist(s)	Tot.
1	Soviet Union	5	1	2	8
2	Sweden	1	1	3	5
3	Finland	0	4	1	5
Total		6	6	6	18

== See also ==
- European Shooting Confederation
- International Shooting Sport Federation
- List of medalists at the European Shooting Championships
- List of medalists at the European Shotgun Championships
