= Puerto Rico at the 1972 Summer Olympics =

- IOC code: PUR
- NOC: Puerto Rico Olympic Committee

in Munich
- Competitors: 53 in 10 sports
- Flag bearer: Arnaldo Bristol
- Medals: Gold 0 Silver 0 Bronze 0 Total 0

Summer Olympics appearances (overview)
- 1948; 1952; 1956; 1960; 1964; 1968; 1972; 1976; 1980; 1984; 1988; 1992; 1996; 2000; 2004; 2008; 2012; 2016; 2020; 2024

Puerto Rico competed at the 1972 Summer Olympics in Munich, West Germany. 53 competitors, all men, took part in 37 events in 10 sports.

== Archery ==
In the first modern archery competition at the Olympics, Puerto Rico entered one man. He came in last place in the men's archery competition.

Men's Individual Competition:

- Ferdinand Vega – 1954 points (55th place)

== Athletics ==
Men's 100 metres

- Jorge Vizcarrondo

- First Heat — 10.79s (→ did not advance)

- Guillermo González

- First Heat — 10.73s (→ did not advance)

- Luis Alers

- First Heat — 11.09s (→ did not advance)

Men's 1500 metres

- Anthony Colón

- Heat — 3:44.6 (→ did not advance)

Men's 4 × 100 m Relay

- Luis Alers, Guillermo González, Pedro Ferrer, and Jorge Vizcarrondo

- Heat — 41.34s (→ did not advance)

== Boxing ==
Men's Light Middleweight (– 71 kg)

- José Antonio Colon

- First Round — Bye
- Second Round — Lost to Loucif Hanmani (ALG), 0:5

== Diving ==
Men's 10m Platform:

- Hector Bas – 254.79 points (→ 31st place)

== Fencing ==
Two fencers represented Puerto Rico in 1972.

Men's épée

- Roberto Levis
- Roberto Maldonado

== Judo ==
Gustavo Brito 73 kg Roberto Pachero 63 kg Juan Marin half heavyweight

== Shooting ==
Eight male shooters represented Puerto Rico in 1972.

25 m pistol

- Simon González
- Fernando Miranda

50 m pistol

- Fernando Miranda
- Santiago Machuca

50 m rifle, prone

- Jaime Santiago
- Manuel Hawayek

50 m running target

- Pedro Ramírez
- Frank Tossas

Skeet

- Rafael Batista
