= Istrate =

Istrate or Eustratie is a Romanian given name and surname that may refer to

Given name

- Eustratie Dabija (?–1665), Prince of Moldavia
- Istrate Micescu (1881–1951), Romanian lawyer

Surname

- Alexandru Istrate (born 1947), Romanian fencer
- Nicolae Istrate (born 1982), Romanian bobsledder
