= Bărăgan (disambiguation) =

Bărăgan may refer to:

- Bărăgan deportations, a large-scale action of penal transportation by the Romanian communist regime
- Bărăgan Plain, a steppe plain in south-eastern Romania
- Costică Bărăgan (born 1949), Romanian fencer
- The Thistles of the Baragan, a 1958 Franco-Romanian film
