= Shooting at the 1972 Summer Olympics – Mixed 50 metre running target =

50 metre running target at the Games of the XX Olympiad
- Venue: Schießanlage
- Date: August 31 & September 1, 1972
- Competitors: 28 from 16 nations
- Winning score: 569 WR

Medalists
1st place, gold medalist(s)		Yakiv Zheleznyak	Soviet Union
2nd place, silver medalist(s)		Helmut Bellingrodt	Colombia
3rd place, bronze medalist(s)		John Kynoch	Great Britain

The following are the results of the 50 metre running target competition at the 1972 Summer Olympics. Various types of a running target event had been held on and off throughout the history of the Olympics. It was last in the Olympics in 1956 where it was a 100 metre running deer event. This event often consisted as a running deer target at several speeds and distances, but at these games it was contested as a running boar shot at 50 metres at two speeds. The gold medal went to Yakiv Zheleznyak of the Soviet Union. He broke the world record in event with a score of 569. The silver medal went to Helmut Bellingrodt of Colombia this was the first Olympic medal won by a Colombian athlete.

== Final ==
The format was: 50 metres; 30 shots at each speed, slow and fast. 60 shots in total, for a possible score of 600.

Rank	Name	Nationality	slow run	fast run	Total
1st place, gold medalist(s)	Yakiv Zheleznyak	Soviet Union	289	280	569 WR
2nd place, silver medalist(s)	Helmut Bellingrodt	Colombia	286	279	565
3rd place, bronze medalist(s)	John Kynoch	Great Britain	284	278	562
4	Valerii Postoyanov	Soviet Union	286	274	560
5	Christoph-Michael Zeisner	West Germany	276	278	554
6	Göte Gåård	Sweden	274	279	553
7	Gunther Danne	West Germany	276	275	551
8	Karl-Axel Karlsson	Sweden	281	270	551
9	Edmund Moeller	United States	285	265	550
10	Giovanni Mezzani	Italy	277	271	548
11	Enrique Rebora	Argentina	279	268	547
12	John H. Larsen Jr.	Norway	278	268	546
13	Gyula Szabó	Hungary	276	269	545
14	Pekka Suomela	Finland	278	267	545
15	Hanspeter Bellingrodt	Colombia	280	265	545
16	Roger Renaux	France	277	267	544
17	Zygmunt Bogdziewicz	Poland	276	265	541
18	Pedro Ramírez	Puerto Rico	275	265	540
19	Charles Davis	United States	276	264	540
20	Kim Song-bok	North Korea	268	268	536
21	Roman Kuzior	Poland	272	264	536
22	István Jenei	Hungary	276	255	531
23	Paavo Mikkonen	Finland	279	251	530
24	John Anthony	Great Britain	273	254	527
25	Tore Skau	Norway	268	258	526
26	Graeme McIntyre	New Zealand	270	253	523
27	Giancarlo Cecconi	Italy	262	258	520
28	Frank Tossas	Puerto Rico	269	186	455
-	Enrique Soto	Mexico			DNS
-	Dok Man-Oh	North Korea			DNS
