= Orvar =

Orvar or Örvar is a Nordic male given name, which means "arrow" in Old Norse. Örvar-Oddr ("arrow's point") is a legendary hero in a 13th-century Icelandic saga. The name may refer to:

- Orvar Bergmark (1930–2004), Swedish football player and manager
- Orvar Jönsson (born 1950), Swedish fencer
- Orvar Lindwall (1941–2025), Swedish fencer
- Orvar Säfström (born 1974), Swedish film critic
- Örvar Þóreyjarson Smárason (born 1977), Icelandic musician
- Orvar Trolle (1900–1971), Swedish swimmer
