= Mikkonen =

Mikkonen is a Finnish surname. Notable people with the surname include:

- Hanna Grobler (born Mikkonen in 1981), Finnish high jumper
- Jenni Honkanen-Mikkonen (born 1980), Finnish sprint canoer, wife of Kalle
- Juho Mikkonen (born 1990), Finnish cross-country skier
- Kalle Mikkonen (born 1976), Finnish sprint canoer
- Marja Mikkonen (born 1979), Finnish artist and filmmaker
- Paavo Mikkonen (born 1942), Finnish sports shooter
- Suvi Mikkonen (born 1988), Finnish taekwondo practitioner
