= Suomela =

Suomela is a Finnish surname. Notable people with the surname include:

- Antti Suomela (born 1994), Finnish ice hockey player
- Iiris Suomela (born 1994), Finnish politician
- Klaus Suomela (1888–1962), Finnish gymnast
- Olavi Suomela (1913–2000), Finnish triple jumper
- Pekka Suomela (born 1938), Finnish sport shooter
- Pentti Suomela (1917–2016), Finnish diplomat
