= Rebora =

Rebora is a surname. Notable people with the surname include:

- Clemente Rebora (1885–1957), Italian poet
- Enrique Rebora (1924–1999), Argentine sports shooter
