= Giancarlo Cecconi =

Italian sport shooter

Personal information
- Born: 15 May 1935 Serravalle, Italy
- Died: 8 February 2012 (aged 76)

Sport
- Sport: Sports shooting

Giancarlo Cecconi (15 May 1935 – 8 February 2012) was an Italian sports shooter. He competed in the 50 metre running target event at the 1972 Summer Olympics.
