= Gunther Danne =

German sport shooter (1942–2025)

Personal information
- Nationality: German
- Born: 1 November 1942 Hanover, Gau Southern Hanover-Brunswick, Germany
- Died: 23 October 2025 (aged 82) Neustift im Stubaital, Tyrol, Austria
- Height: 186
- Weight: 103

Sport
- Sport: Sports shooting

Gunther Danne (1 November 1942 – 23 October 2025) was a German sports shooter. He competed in the 50 metre running target event at the 1972 Summer Olympics for West Germany, where he came in 7th with a total score of 551.

Danne died on 23 October 2025, at the age of 82.
