= Christer Jansson =

Swedish sports shooter

Personal information
- Born: 1 October 1946 (age 79) Stockholm, Sweden

Sport
- Sport: Sports shooting

Christer Jansson (born 1 October 1946) is a Swedish former sports shooter. He competed in two events at the 1972 Summer Olympics.
