= Turkey at the 1972 Summer Olympics =

- IOC code: TUR
- NOC: Turkish National Olympic Committee

in Munich
- Competitors: 43 in 8 sports
- Flag bearer: Gıyasettin Yılmaz
- Medals Ranked 33rd: Gold 0 Silver 1 Bronze 0 Total 1

Summer Olympics appearances (overview)
- 1908; 1912; 1920; 1924; 1928; 1932; 1936; 1948; 1952; 1956; 1960; 1964; 1968; 1972; 1976; 1980; 1984; 1988; 1992; 1996; 2000; 2004; 2008; 2012; 2016; 2020; 2024

Other related appearances
- 1906 Intercalated Games

Turkey competed at the 1972 Summer Olympics in Munich, West Germany. 43 competitors, 42 men and 1 woman, took part in 43 events in 8 sports.

== Medalists ==
Medal	Name	Sport	Event
Silver	Vehbi Akdağ	Wrestling	Men's Freestyle Featherweight

== Athletics ==
Men's 800 metres

- Mehmet Tümkan

- Heat — 1:49.5 (→ did not advance)

Men's 1500 metres

- Mehmet Tümkan

- Heat — 3:44.0 (→ did not advance)

Men's 5000 metres

- Hikmet Şen

- Heat — 14:26.0 (→ did not advance)

== Boxing ==
Men's Light Flyweight (– 48 kg)

- Arif Doğru

- First Round — Lost to Davey Armstrong (USA), 1:4

Men's Flyweight (– 51 kg)

- Kemal Sonunur

- First Round — Bye
- Second Round — Lost to Constantin Gruescu (ROM), 0:5

Men's Bantamweight (– 54 kg)

- Mehmet Kumova

- First Round — Lost to Mayaki Seydou (NIG), 2:3

== Cycling ==
Six cyclists represented Turkey in 1972.

Individual road race

- Ali Hüryılmaz — 73rd place
- Mevlüt Boradid not finish (→ no ranking)
- Rıfat Çalışkan — did not finish (→ no ranking)
- Haluk Günözgen — did not finish (→ no ranking)

Team time trial

- Mevlüt Bora
- Erol Küçükbakırcı
- Ali Hüryılmaz
- Seyit Kırmızı

== Fencing ==
Four fencers, three men and one woman, represented Turkey in 1972.

Men's foil

- Bülent Erdem

Men's épée

- Ali Tayla

Men's sabre

- Mehmet Akpınar

Women's foil

- Özden Ezinler

== Shooting ==
Four male shooters represented Turkey in 1972.

50 m rifle, three positions

- Mehmet Dursun

50 m rifle, prone

- Mehmet Dursun

Trap

- Fettah Güney

Skeet

- Özman Gıraud
- Güneş Yunus

== Swimming ==
- Faruk Morkal
- Feridun Aybars

Men’s 100m Freestyle — Heat — 59.32s (→ did not advance)
Men’s 100m Butterfly
