= Rudi Maier =

West German fencer

Personal information
- Born: 4 January 1945 Waldkirch, Germany
- Died: 8 December 2017 (aged 72) Waldkirch, Germany
- Height: 1.84 m (6 ft 0 in)
- Weight: 77 kg (170 lb)

Sport
- Sport: Fencing
- Club: SV Waldkirch

Rudolf "Rudi" Maier (4 January 1945 – 8 December 2017) was a West German fencer. Maier, an épéeist, won the 1971 Heidenheim tournament, a premier event on the Fencing World Cup. He competed in the 1972 Summer Olympics, collapsing during his first bout with a suspected blood clot on the brain; the incident rendered him quadriplegic thereafter.

Maier began fencing at 17. His first significant achievement came in 1969, when he placed third at the West Germany national championships. A year later, he won an international competition in Budapest. He reached the height of his success in 1971, winning the Heidenheimer Pokal (de). He also placed 7th at the 1970 World Championships.

Maier qualified for the Olympic Games in 1972 and was among the favorites in the competition. He was placed in Pool D. His first bout was against Jacques Ladègaillerie of France, a significant opponent who would go on to win the silver medal in the event. Maier led the bout, 3–1, when he collapsed. He was taken to the hospital. The cause of the collapse was thought to be a blood clot that reached his brain. Maier had had circulatory problems, with only one functioning kidney, since childhood. A reaction to a contrast agent left him quadriplegic.

After the Olympics, Maier worked training telecommunications technicians and was a beekeeper as a hobby. His hometown of Waldkirch holds an annual international épée tournament in his honor.
