= Roman Kuzior =

Polish sports shooter

Personal information
- Born: 13 February 1949 (age 77) Wędzina, Poland

Sport
- Sport: Sports shooting

Roman Kuzior (born 13 February 1949) is a Polish former sports shooter. He competed in the 50 metre running target event at the 1972 Summer Olympics.
