= Roger Renaux =

French sports shooter

Personal information
- Born: 3 December 1925 Marseille, France
- Died: 4 March 2003 (aged 77) Marseille, France

Sport
- Sport: Sports shooting

Roger Adrien Julien Renaux (3 December 1925 – 4 March 2003) was a French sport shooter. He competed in the 50 metre running target event at the 1972 Summer Olympics.
