= Fencing at the 1967 Mediterranean Games =

Fencing competition

- Location: Tunis, Tunisia
- Dates: September 1967

The fencing competition at the 1967 Mediterranean Games was held in Tunis, Tunisia.

== Medalists ==
Event	Gold	Silver	Bronze
Individual épée	Jacques Ladègaillerie (FRA)	Gianfranco Paolucci (ITA)	Ali Chekr (LBN)
Individual foil	Nicola Granieri (ITA)	Christian Noël (FRA)	Pierre Rodocanachi (FRA)
Individual sabre	Bernard Vallée (FRA)	Martinelli (ITA)	Michele Maffei (ITA)

== Medal table ==
Rank	Nation	Gold	Silver	Bronze	Total
1	France (FRA)	2	1	1	4
2	Italy (ITA)	1	2	1	4
3	Lebanon (LBN)	0	0	1	1
Totals (3 entries)		3	3	3	9
