= Kim Song-bok =

North Korean sports shooter (born 1952)

Personal information
- Born: 12 May 1952 (age 74)

Sport
- Sport: Sports shooting

Kim Song-bok (born 12 May 1952) is a North Korean former sports shooter. He competed in the 50 metre running target event at the 1972 Summer Olympics.
