= John Kynoch =

British sport shooter (born 1933)

Personal information
- Born: 18 March 1933 (age 93)

Sport
- Sport: Sport shooting
Medal record
Men's shooting
Representing United Kingdom
Olympic Games
Bronze medal – third place	1972 Munich	Running target

John Marriott Kynoch (born 18 March 1933) is a sport shooter who has competed for Great Britain. He won the bronze medal in running game target at the 1972 Summer Olympics in Munich.

Born and raised in New Zealand, Kynoch was educated at Huntley School from 1941 to 1946 and Nelson College between 1947 and 1950. He did a short course at Massey Agricultural College before emigrating to Banffshire, Scotland in the early 1950s to work in the family woollen mill.
