= Tore Skau =

Norwegian sports shooter (born 1945)

Personal information
- Born: 5 May 1945 (age 81) Tønsberg, Norway

Sport
- Sport: Sports shooting

Tore Skau (born 5 May 1945) is a Norwegian former sports shooter. He competed in the 50 metre running target event at the 1972 Summer Olympics.
