= Panagiotis Dourakos =

Greek fencer

Personal information
- Born: 4 November 1952 (age 73)

Sport
- Sport: Fencing

Panagiotis Dourakos (Greek: Παναγιώτης Ντουράκος; born 4 November 1952) is a Greek fencer. He competed in the individual épée event at the 1972 Summer Olympics.
