= Italo Casali =

Sammarinese sports shooter (1940–2019)

Personal information
- Born: 2 July 1940
- Died: 2019 (aged 78–79)

Sport
- Sport: Sports shooting

Italo Casali (2 July 1940 – 2019) was a Sammarinese sports shooter. He competed at the 1972 Summer Olympics and the 1976 Summer Olympics. He died in 2019 at the age of 78.

Outside of sport, Casali worked at a bank.
