= Lennart Fagerlund =

Swedish cyclist (born 1952)

Personal information
- Born: 2 April 1952 (age 74) Nässjö, Sweden

Cycling career
- Sport: Cycling

Lennart Fagerlund (born 2 April 1952) is a Swedish former cyclist. He competed in the individual road race and team time trial events at the 1972 Summer Olympics. His sporting career began with Mariestadcyclisten.
