= Aly Doerfel =

Luxembourgish fencer (1949–2021)

Personal information
- Born: 26 September 1949 Luxembourg City, Luxembourg
- Died: 23 May 2021 (aged 71)

Sport
- Sport: Fencing

Aly Doerfel (26 September 1949 – 23 May 2021) was a Luxembourgish fencer. He competed in the team épée event at the 1972 Summer Olympics.
