= Guy Evéquoz =

Swiss fencer

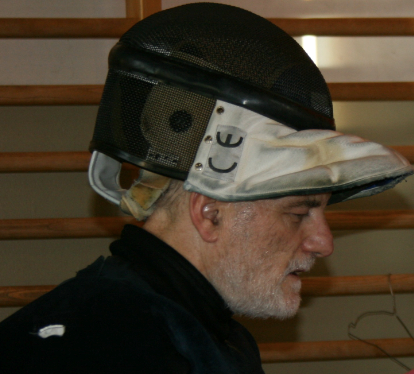

Personal information
- Born: 20 April 1952 (age 74)

Sport
- Sport: Fencing
Medal record
Men's fencing
Representing Switzerland
Olympic Games
Silver medal – second place	1972 Munich	Épée, team

Guy Evéquoz (born 20 April 1952) is a Swiss fencer. He won a silver medal in the team épée event at the 1972 Summer Olympics.
