= Enrique Rebora =

Argentine sports shooter

Personal information
- Born: 5 October 1924 Lanus, Argentina
- Died: 21 July 1999 (aged 74) Buenos Aires, Argentina

Sport
- Sport: Sports shooting

Enrique Rebora (5 October 1924 – 21 July 1999) was an Argentine sports shooter. He competed in the 50 metre running target event at the 1972 Summer Olympics.
