= Gianluigi Placella =

Italian fencer (born 1948)

Personal information
- Born: 19 March 1948 (age 78) Naples, Italy

Sport
- Sport: Fencing

Gianluigi Placella (born 19 March 1948) is an Italian fencer. He competed in the team épée event at the 1972 Summer Olympics.
