= Mevlüt Bora =

Turkish cyclist

Personal information
- Born: 1 June 1947 (age 79) Bulgaria

Cycling career
- Sport: Cycling

Mevlüt Bora (born 1 June 1947) is a former Turkish cyclist. He competed in the individual road race and team time trial events at the 1972 Summer Olympics.
