= Rune Flodman =

Swedish sports shooter (1926–2014)

Personal information
- Born: 1 April 1926 Karlskoga, Sweden
- Died: 21 February 2014 (aged 87) Västmanland, Sweden

Sport
- Sport: Sports shooting

Rune Flodman (1 April 1926 – 21 February 2014) was a Swedish sports shooter. He competed in the trap event at the 1964 Summer Olympics.
