= Sándor Erdős =

Hungarian fencer (born 1947)

Personal information
- Born: 21 August 1947 (age 78) Budapest, Hungary

Sport
- Sport: Fencing
Medal record
Men's fencing
Representing Hungary
Olympic Games
Gold medal – first place	1972 Munich	Team épée

Sándor Erdős (born 21 August 1947 in Budapest) is a Hungarian épée fencer.

== Olympics ==
Erdős won a gold medal in the team épée at the 1972 Summer Olympics in Munich.

At the 1976 Summer Olympics he came in 4th in the team épée, and tied for 7th in the team foil.

== See also ==
- List of select Jewish fencers
- List of Jewish Olympic medalists
