= Jean-Charles Seneca =

Monégasque fencer (born 1945)

Personal information
- Born: 23 October 1945 (age 80) La Colle, Monaco

Sport
- Sport: Fencing

Jean-Charles Seneca (born 23 October 1945) is a Monégasque fencer. He competed in the individual épée event at the 1972 Summer Olympics. He was also Monaco's flag bearer during the Opening Ceremony.

He reached the final of 1972 Challenge Martini - épée in London
