= Romain Manelli =

Luxembourgish fencer

Personal information
- Born: 2 June 1951 (age 75)

Sport
- Sport: Fencing

Romain Manelli (born 2 June 1951) is a Luxembourgish fencer and business executive. He competed in the team épée event at the 1972 Summer Olympics.
