= René Varas =

Chilean equestrian (born 1936)

Personal information
- Nationality: Chilean
- Born: 19 May 1936 (age 90)

Sport
- Sport: Equestrian
Medal record
Equestrian
Representing Chile
Pan American Games
Bronze medal – third place	1971 Cali	Team jumping

René Varas (born 19 May 1936) is a Chilean equestrian. He competed in two events at the 1972 Summer Olympics.
