= Hans Wieselgren =

Swedish fencer

Personal information
- Full name: Hans Peter Wieselgren
- Nationality: Swedish
- Born: March 26, 1952 (age 74) Gothenburg, Sweden
- Height: 187 cm (6 ft 2 in)
- Weight: 63 kg (139 lb)

Sport
- Sport: Fencing
- Event: épée
- College team: New York University
- Now coaching: Morristown High School

Achievements and titles
- Personal bests: 1972 Olympian; 1977 NCAA épée champion

Hans Peter Wieselgren (born March 26, 1952) is a Swedish Olympic épée fencer. He competed for Sweden in the team épée event at the 1972 Munich Olympics, and was the 1977 NCAA épée champion.

== Fencing career ==
Born in Gothenburg, Sweden, Wieselgren competed for Sweden in the team épée event at the 1972 Munich Olympics. The team came in seventh, behind Poland and ahead of the United States.

Two years after the Olympics, Wieselgren moved to the United States (where he has remained) and attended New York University (NYU) on scholarship, where he was in the class of 1977. He fenced épée for the university's NYU Violets. In 1974, he was the Intercollegiate Fencing Association épée runner-up. In 1976, he led NYU to the NCAA Fencing Team Championship, and came in second in individual épée. In 1977, he was the NCAA épée individual champion.

Wieselgren is currently the épée fencing coach at Morristown High School in Morristown, New Jersey.

== Awards ==
Wieselgren was inducted into the NYU Hall of Fame in 1977.

== See also ==
- List of NCAA fencing champions
