= Georgi Zažitski =

Soviet fencer (born 1946)

Personal information
- Born: 5 February 1946 (age 80) Luga, Leningrad Oblast, Russian SFSR, Soviet Union

Sport
- Sport: Fencing
Medal record
Men's fencing
Representing Soviet Union
Olympic Games
Bronze medal – third place	1972 Munich	Épée, team

Georgi Zažitski (born 5 February 1946), also known as Georgy Semyonovich Zazhitski (Георгий Семёнович Зажицкий), is a Soviet fencer. He won a bronze medal in the team épée event at the 1972 Summer Olympics.
