= Pier Alberto Testoni =

Italian fencer (born 1950)

Personal information
- Born: 11 April 1950 (age 76) Turin, Italy

Sport
- Sport: Fencing

Pier Alberto Testoni (born 11 April 1950) is an Italian fencer. He competed in the individual épée event at the 1972 Summer Olympics.
