= Luis Alers =

Puerto Rican sprinter

Personal information
- Nationality: Puerto Rican
- Born: 20 September 1950 Aguadilla, Puerto Rico
- Died: 9 January 2005 (aged 54) Trujillo Alto, Puerto Rico

Sport
- Sport: Sprinting
- Event: 100 metres

Luis Alers (20 September 1950 – 9 January 2005) was a Puerto Rican sprinter. He competed in the men's 100 metres at the 1972 Summer Olympics.
