= Pekka Suomela =

Finnish sport shooter

Personal information
- Full name: Pekka Juhani Suomela
- Born: 15 June 1938 (age 88) Tampere, Finland

Sport
- Sport: Sports shooting

Pekka Juhani Suomela (born 15 June 1938) is a Finnish former sports shooter. He competed in the 50 metre running target event at the 1972 Summer Olympics.
