= Győző Kulcsár =

Hungarian fencer (1940–2018)

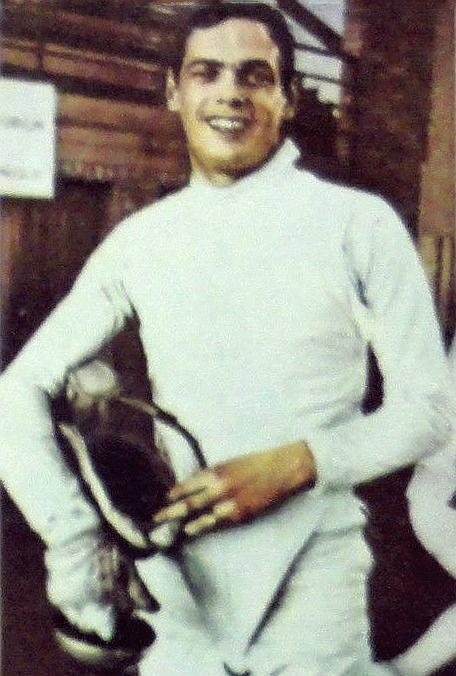

Personal information
- Born: 18 October 1940 Budapest, Hungary
- Died: 19 September 2018 (aged 77)
- Height: 1.88 m (6 ft 2 in)
- Weight: 79 kg (174 lb)

Sport
- Sport: Fencing
- Club: OSC, Budapest
Medal record
Representing Hungary
Olympic Games
Gold medal – first place	1964 Tokyo	Épée team
Gold medal – first place	1968 Mexico City	Épée individual
Gold medal – first place	1968 Mexico City	Épée team
Gold medal – first place	1972 Munich	Épée team
Bronze medal – third place	1972 Munich	Épée individual
Bronze medal – third place	1976 Montreal	Épée individual

Győző Kulcsár (18 October 1940 – 19 September 2018) was a Hungarian fencer. He competed in the individual and team épée events at the 1964, 1968, 1972 and 1976 Olympics and won four gold (one individual and three team) and two individual bronze medals. He also won three world titles with the Hungarian team, in 1970, 1971 and 1978.

After retiring from competitions Kulcsár worked as a fencing coach, in Hungary (c. 1980–1988 and after 2001) and Italy (c. 1988–2000). His trainees include Tímea Nagy, Emese Szász and his nephew Krisztián Kulcsár.

He died on 19 September 2018 at the age of 77.
