= Paavo Mikkonen =

Finnish sport shooter

Personal information
- Full name: Paavo Juhani Mikkonen
- Born: 25 January 1942 (age 84) Valkeala, Finland

Sport
- Sport: Sports shooting

Paavo Juhani Mikkonen (born 25 January 1942) is a Finnish former sports shooter. He competed in the 50 metre running target event at the 1972 Summer Olympics.
