= Kamal Kamel Mohammed =

Egyptian basketball player

Personal information
- Nationality: Egyptian
- Born: 8 June 1945 (age 79)

Sport
- Sport: Basketball

Kamal Kamel Mohammed (born 8 June 1945) is an Egyptian basketball player. He competed in the men's tournament at the 1972 Summer Olympics.
