= Valery Yardy =

Soviet cyclist (1948–1994)

Personal information
- Born: 18 January 1948 Brenyashi, Chuvash ASSR, Soviet Union
- Died: 1 August 1994 (aged 46) Cheboksary, Russia
- Height: 178 cm (5 ft 10 in)
- Weight: 69 kg (152 lb)

Cycling career
- Sport: Cycling
Medal record
Representing URS
Olympic Games
Gold medal – first place	1972 Munich	Team time trial
UCI Road World Championships
Gold medal – first place	1970 Leicester	Team time trial

Valery Nikolayevich Yardy (Russian: Валерий Николаевич Ярды, 18 January 1948 – 1 August 1994) was a Russian road cyclist who competed in the 1968 and 1972 Olympics. In 1968 he placed 17th individually and ninth with the Soviet team. Four years later he failed to finish his individual race, but won a gold medal with the team. Yardy won another team gold medal at the 1970 World Championships.
