= Csaba Fenyvesi =

Hungarian fencer (1943–2015)

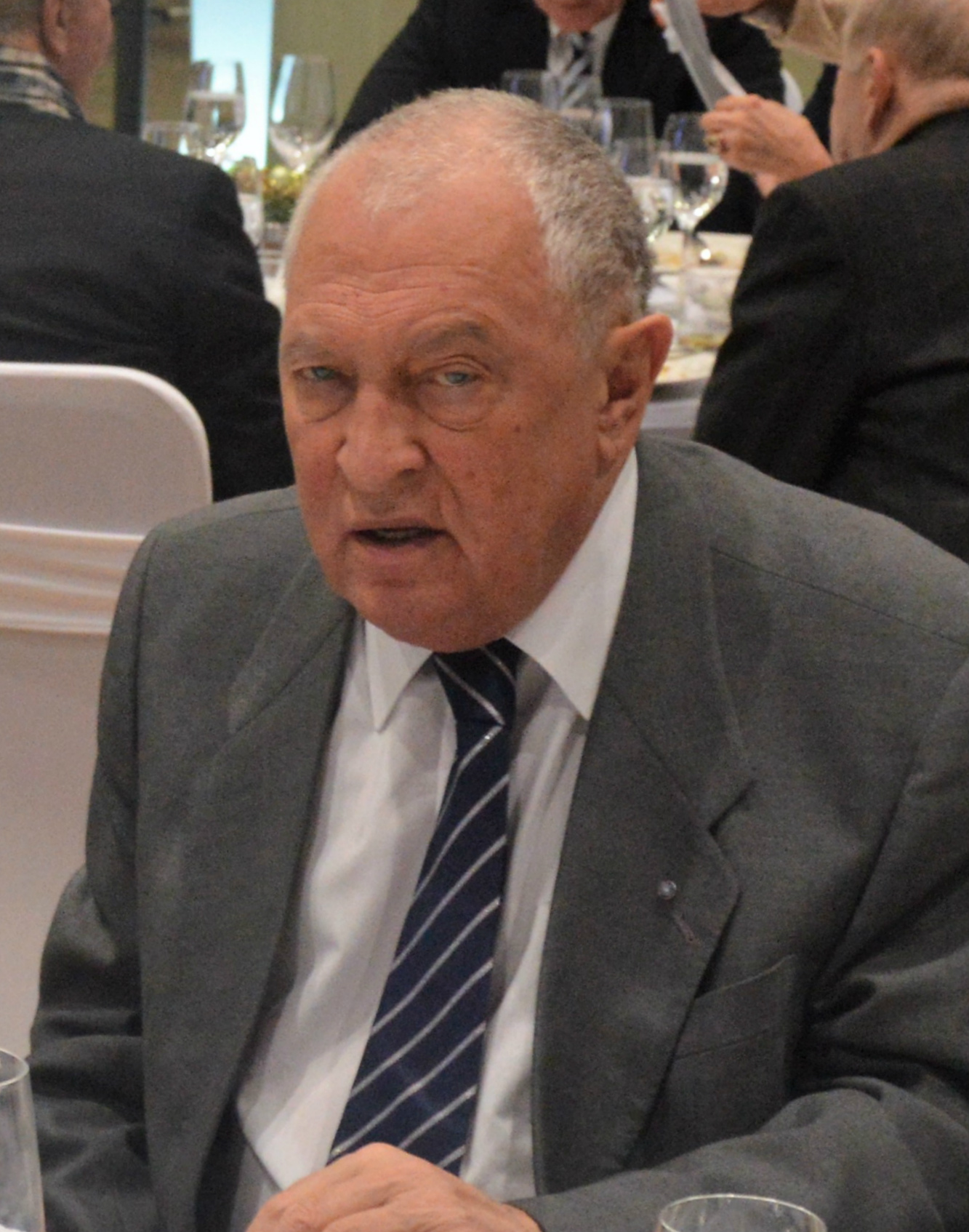
- Fenyvesi in 2014

Personal information
- Born: 14 April 1943 Budapest, Hungary
- Died: 3 November 2015 (aged 72) Budapest, Hungary
- Height: 184 cm (6 ft 0 in)
- Weight: 79 kg (174 lb)

Sport
- Sport: Fencing
Medal record
Men's fencing
Representing Hungary
Olympic Games
Gold medal – first place	1968 Mexico City	Épée Team
Gold medal – first place	1972 Munich	Épée Team
Gold medal – first place	1972 Munich	Épée Individual

Csaba Fenyvesi (14 April 1943 – 3 November 2015) was a Hungarian fencer and Olympic champion in épée competition.

He won a gold medal in the individual épée event at the 1972 Summer Olympics in Munich. He participated on the Hungarian teams that won gold medals in team épée in 1968 and in 1972. Fenyvesi died following a short illness on November 3, 2015 at the age of 72.
