= Morten Krogh =

Norwegian fencer

Personal information
- Full name: Morten Hans von Krogh
- Born: 27 May 1948 Oslo, Norway
- Died: 25 September 2015 (aged 67)

Sport
- Sport: Fencing

Morten Hans von Krogh (27 May 1948 – 25 September 2015) was a Norwegian fencer and actor.

He won five Norwegian championships between 1969 and 1986, and competed in the individual épée event at the 1972 Summer Olympics. He was one of the spearheads of the Norwegian 1980 Olympic boycott.

Krogh later served as rector of the Norwegian National Academy of Theatre. He died in September 2015.
