= Fernando Miranda (sport shooter) =

Puerto Rican sport shooter

Personal information
- Born: 3 August 1939 (age 86) Río Piedras, Puerto Rico

Sport
- Sport: Sports shooting

Fernando Miranda (born 3 August 1939) is a Puerto Rican former sports shooter. He competed at the 1968 Summer Olympics and the 1972 Summer Olympics.
