= Jorge Castillejos =

Mexican fencer

Personal information
- Born: 6 July 1951 (age 74) Veracruz, Mexico

Sport
- Sport: Fencing

Jorge Castillejos (born 6 July 1951) is a Mexican fencer. He competed at the 1968 and 1972 Summer Olympics.
