= Bernd Uhlig =

German fencer (born 1942)

Personal information
- Born: 7 August 1942 (age 84) Mecklenburg-Vorpommern, Germany

Sport
- Sport: Fencing

Bernd Uhlig (born 7 August 1942) is a German fencer. He competed for East Germany at the 1968 and 1972 Summer Olympics.
