= Peter Askjær-Friis =

Danish fencer

Personal information
- Born: 17 April 1947 (age 79) Copenhagen, Denmark

Sport
- Sport: Fencing

Peter Askjær-Friis (born 17 April 1947) is a Danish fencer. He competed in the individual and team épée events at the 1972 Summer Olympics.
