= Viktor Bazhenov =

Soviet fencer (born 1946)

Personal information
- Born: 6 August 1946 (age 79) Omsk, Russian SFSR, Soviet Union

Sport
- Sport: Fencing
Medal record
Men's fencing
Representing Soviet Union
Olympic Games
Silver medal – second place	1972 Munich	Sabre, team

Viktor Bazhenov (Russian: Виктор Андреевич Баженов; born 6 August 1946) is a Soviet fencer. He won a silver medal in the team sabre event at the 1972 Summer Olympics.
