= Horst Melzig =

German fencer

Personal information
- Born: 2 October 1940 Tessin, Germany
- Died: 1 August 2022 (aged 81)

Sport
- Sport: Fencing

Horst Melzig (2 October 1940 – 1 August 2022) was a German fencer. He competed for East Germany in the individual and team épée events at the 1972 Summer Olympics.
