= Alain Anen =

Luxembourgish fencer (1950–2025)

Personal information
- Born: 24 May 1950 Differdange, Luxembourg
- Died: 19 August 2025 (aged 75)

Sport
- Sport: Fencing

Alain Anen (24 May 1950 – 19 August 2025) was a Luxembourgish fencer. He competed in the individual and team épée events at the 1972 Summer Olympics.

Anen died on 19 August 2025, at the age of 75.
