= Ali Sleiman =

Lebanese fencer

Personal information
- Born: 28 March 1947 (age 79)

Sport
- Sport: Fencing

Ali Sleiman (Arabic: علي سليمان; born 28 March 1947) is a Lebanese épée and foil fencer. He competed in four events at the 1972 Summer Olympics.
