= Reinhard Münster =

Danish fencer

Personal information
- Born: 1 October 1941 (age 84) Neustrelitz, Germany

Sport
- Sport: Fencing

Reinhard Münster (born 1 October 1941) is a Danish fencer. He competed in the individual and team épée events at the 1972 Summer Olympics.
