= Nicola Granieri =

Italian fencer (1942–2006)

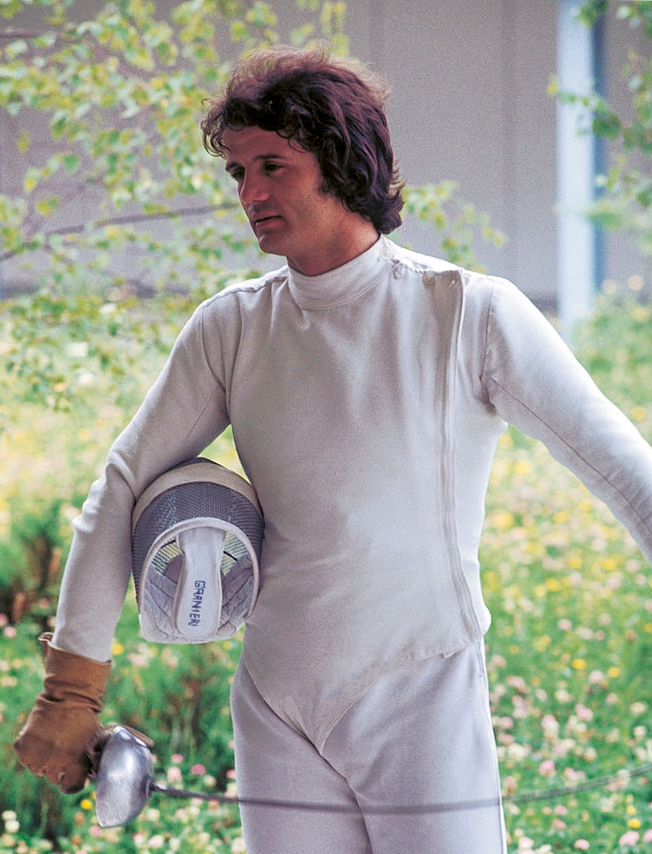
- Nicola Granieri at the 1972 Olympics

Personal information
- Born: 3 July 1942 Turin, Italy
- Died: 28 December 2006 (aged 64) Turin, Italy
- Height: 1.82 m (6 ft 0 in)
- Weight: 81 kg (179 lb)

Sport
- Sport: Fencing
- Club: Club Scherma Torino
Medal record
Representing Italy
World Championships
Silver medal – second place	1971 Vienna	Team épée
Bronze medal – third place	1975 Budapest	Team foil
Mediterranean Games
Gold medal – first place	1967 Tunis	Individual foil
Summer Universiade
Gold medal – first place	1967 Tokyo	Team sabre
Silver medal – second place	1967 Tokyo	Team épée
Silver medal – second place	1970 Turin	Individual épée
Bronze medal – third place	1963 Porto Alegre	Team sabre
Bronze medal – third place	1967 Tokyo	Individual foil
Bronze medal – third place	1970 Turin	Team épée

Nicola Granieri (3 July 1942 – 28 December 2006) was an Italian fencer. He competed at the 1964, 1968, 1972 and 1976 Summer Olympics in both épée and foil individual and team events with the best achievement of 7th place. He won a gold medal at the 1967 Mediterranean Games in the individual foil event. He was the épée champion at the 1971 Fencing World Cup and won seventeen national titles over the course of his career. Granieri was also the president of the fencing club in his home town of Turin during 24 years.
