= Jacques Brodin =

French fencer (1946–2015)

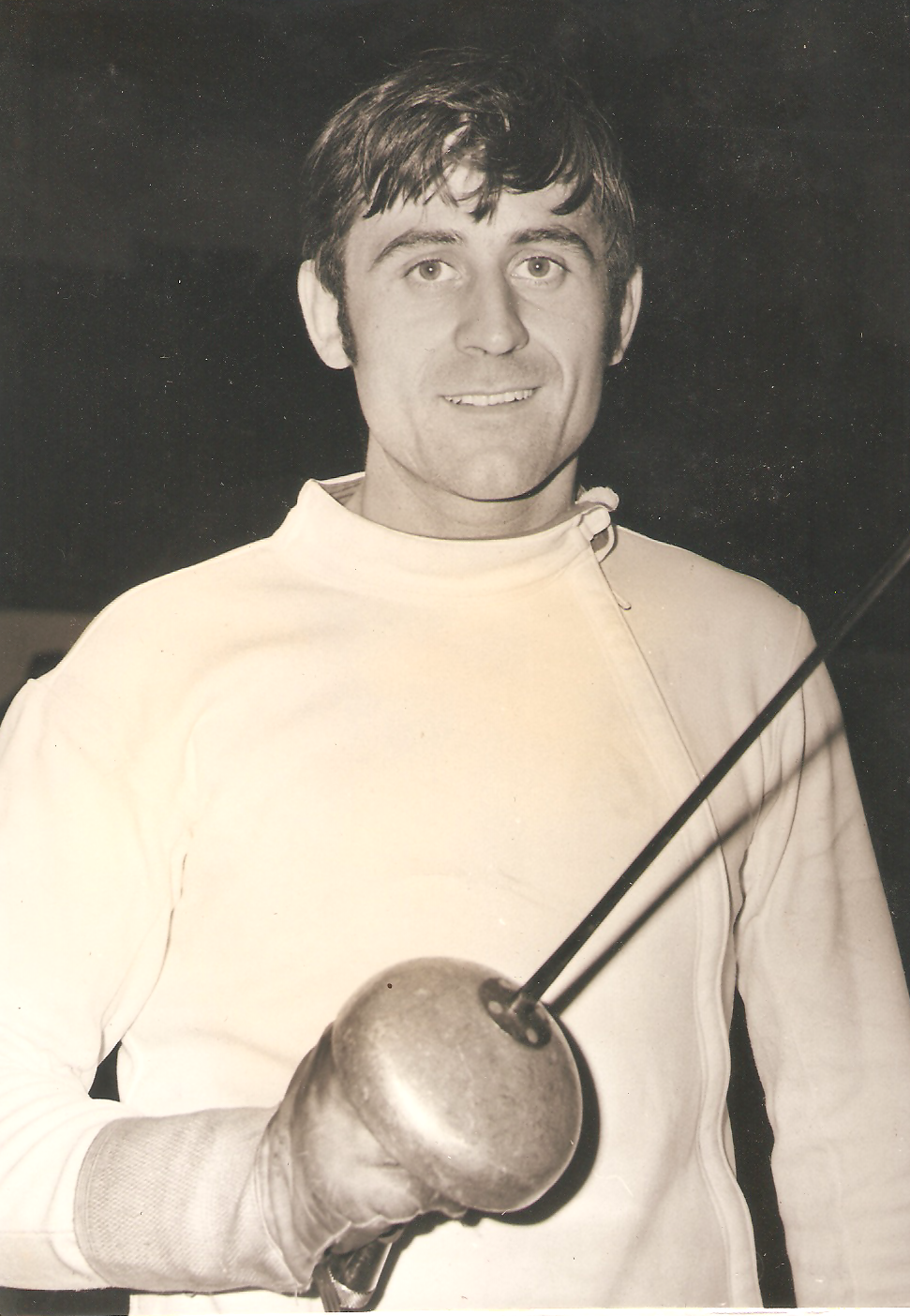

Personal information
- Born: 22 December 1946
- Died: 1 October 2015 (aged 68)

Sport
- Sport: Fencing
Medal record
Men's fencing
Representing France
Olympic Games
Bronze medal – third place	1964 Tokyo	Épée, team

Jacques Brodin (22 December 1946 – 1 October 2015) was a French fencer. He won a bronze medal in the team épée event at the 1964 Summer Olympics.
