= François Jeanne =

French fencer (1943–2011)

Personal information
- Born: 13 November 1943
- Died: 30 January 2011 (aged 67)

Sport
- Sport: Fencing
Medal record
Mediterranean Games
Bronze medal – third place	1971 Izmir	Individual épée

François Jeanne (13 November 1943 – 30 January 2011) was a French fencer. He competed at the 1968, 1972 and 1976 Summer Olympics. He won a bronze medal at the 1971 Mediterranean Games in the individual épée event.
