= Ali Tayla =

Turkish fencer

Personal information
- Born: 17 September 1949 (age 76)

Sport
- Sport: Fencing

Ali Tayla (born 17 September 1949) is a Turkish fencer. He competed in the individual épée event at the 1972 Summer Olympics.
