= Claudio Francesconi =

Italian fencer (born 1945)

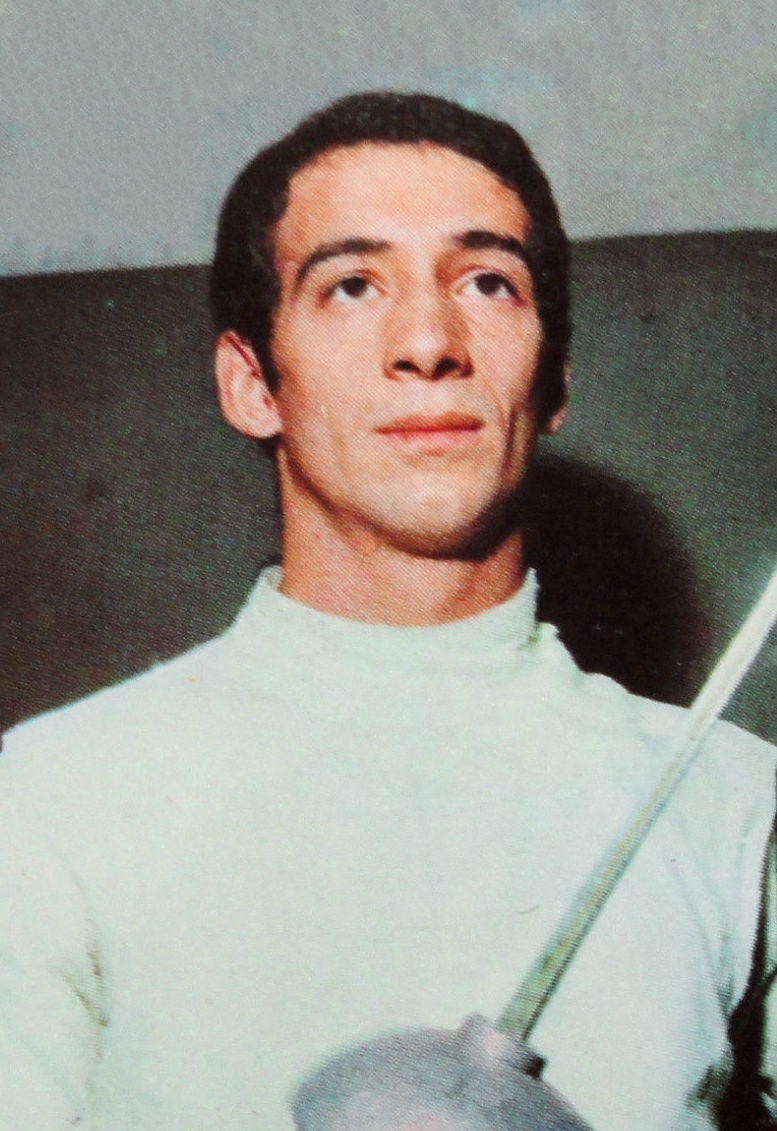
- Claudio Francesconi c. 1968

Personal information
- Born: 15 May 1945 (age 81) Milan, Italy
- Height: 1.66 m (5 ft 5 in)
- Weight: 53 kg (117 lb)

Sport
- Sport: Fencing

Claudio Francesconi (born 15 May 1945) is a retired Italian fencer. He competed in the individual and team épée events at the 1968 and 1972 Summer Olympics with the best result of sixth place with the Italian team in 1968.
