= Lester Wong =

Canadian fencer

Personal information
- Born: 28 August 1944 (age 81) China

Sport
- Sport: Fencing

Lester Wong (born 28 August 1944) is a Canadian fencer. He competed in the individual and team foil and épée events at the 1972 Summer Olympics.
