= Roberto Maldonado (fencer) =

Puerto Rican fencer

Personal information
- Born: 7 June 1936
- Died: 22 January 2022 (aged 85)

Sport
- Sport: Fencing

Roberto Maldonado (7 June 1936 – 22 January 2022) was a Puerto Rican fencer. He competed in the individual épée event at the 1972 Summer Olympics.
