= Per Sundberg (fencer) =

Swedish fencer

Personal information
- Born: 8 May 1949 Malmö, Sweden
- Died: 3 May 2015 (aged 65) Höllviken, Sweden

Sport
- Sport: Fencing

Per Sundberg (8 May 1949 – 3 May 2015) was a Swedish fencer. He competed in the individual foil and team épée events at the 1972 Summer Olympics.
