= Herbert Obst =

Canadian fencer

Personal information
- Born: 26 June 1936 (age 90) Striegau, Germany

Sport
- Sport: Fencing

Herbert Obst (born 26 June 1936) is a Canadian fencer. He competed in the individual and team foil and épée events at the 1972 Summer Olympics. Herbert was a Canadian National Champion in fencing.
