= Ivan Kemnitz =

Danish fencer (born 1943)

Personal information
- Born: 14 April 1943 (age 83) Copenhagen, Denmark

Sport
- Sport: Fencing

Ivan Kemnitz (born 14 April 1943) is a Danish fencer who competed in the individual and team épée events at the 1972 Summer Olympics.
