= Gerry Wiedel =

Canadian fencer (1933–2023)

Personal information
- Born: 13 May 1933 Hildburghausen, Thuringia, Germany
- Died: 1 November 2023 (aged 90) Bracebridge, Ontario, Canada

Sport
- Sport: Fencing

Gerard Wiedel (13 May 1933 – 1 November 2023) was a German-born Canadian épée and foil fencer. He competed at the 1968 and 1972 Summer Olympics. Gerry died in Bracebridge, Ontario on 1 November 2023, at the age of 90.
