= Luis Stephens =

Mexican fencer

Personal information
- Born: 21 May 1938 (age 88)

Sport
- Sport: Fencing

Luis Stephens (born 21 May 1938) is a Mexican fencer. He competed in the individual and team épée events at the 1972 Summer Olympics.
