= Ali Chekr =

Lebanese fencer

Personal information
- Born: 1 July 1937 (age 89) Beqaa, Lebanon

Sport
- Sport: Fencing
Medal record
Mediterranean Games
Bronze medal – third place	1967 Tunis	Individual épée

Ali Chekr (born 1 July 1937) is a Lebanese épée and foil fencer. He competed at the 1968 and 1972 Summer Olympics. He also competed at the 1967 Mediterranean Games where he won a bronze medal in the individual épée event.
