= Yakov Zheleznyak =

Soviet sport shooter

Yakiv Zheleznyak
Personal information
- Born: 10 April 1941 (age 85) Odesa, Ukrainian SSR, Soviet Union

Sport
- Sport: Sports shooting
Medal record
Men's shooting
Representing Soviet Union
Olympic Games
Gold medal – first place	1972 Munich	Running target

Yakov Zheleznyak (born 10 April 1941) is a former Soviet sport shooter and Olympic champion. He won a gold medal in the 50 m Running Target at the 1972 Summer Olympics in Munich.
