= Remo Manelli =

Luxembourgish fencer

Personal information
- Born: 13 November 1942 (age 83)

Sport
- Sport: Fencing

Remo Manelli (born 13 November 1942) is a Luxembourgish fencer. He competed in the individual and team épée events at the 1972 Summer Olympics.
