= Roberto Levis =

Puerto Rican fencer

Personal information
- Born: 6 January 1941 (age 85)

Sport
- Sport: Fencing

Roberto Levis (born 6 January 1941) is a Puerto Rican fencer. He competed in the individual épée event at the 1972 Summer Olympics.
