= Karl-Axel Karlsson =

Swedish sports shooter (1939–2011)

Personal information
- Born: 5 September 1939 Uddevalla, Västra Götaland, Sweden
- Died: 3 December 2011 (aged 72)

Sport
- Sport: Sports shooting

Karl-Axel Karlsson (5 September 1939 – 3 December 2011) was a Swedish sports shooter. He competed at the 1972 and 1976 Summer Olympics.
