= Grigory Kriss =

Soviet fencer (born 1940)

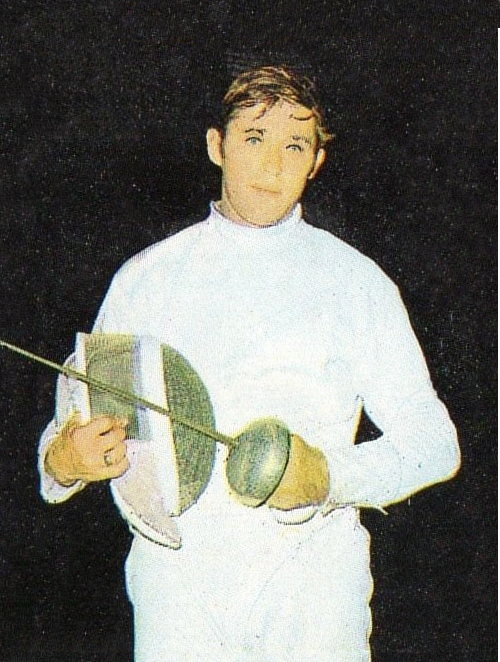

Personal information
- Full name: Hryhoriy Yakovych Kriss
- Born: 24 December 1940 (age 85) Kyiv, Ukrainian SSR, Soviet Union
- Height: 175 cm (5 ft 9 in)
- Weight: 71 kg (157 lb)

Sport
- Country: Soviet Union
- Sport: Fencing
- Event: Épée
- Club: SKA Kiev
Medal record
Representing Soviet Union
Olympic Games
Gold medal – first place	1964 Tokyo	Ind. epée
Silver medal – second place	1968 Mexico City	Ind. epée
Silver medal – second place	1968 Mexico City	Team epée
Bronze medal – third place	1972 Munich	Team epée
World Championships
Bronze medal – third place	1965 Paris	Team epée
Silver medal – second place	1966 Moscow	Team epée
Gold medal – first place	1967 Montreal	Team epée
Silver medal – second place	1967 Montreal	Ind. epée
Gold medal – first place	1969 Havana	Team epée
Gold medal – first place	1971 Viena	Ind. epée
Silver medal – second place	1971 Viena	Team epée

Grigory Yakovlevich Kriss (Ukrainian: Григорій Якович Крісс, Russian: Григорий Яковлевич Крисс, born 24 December 1940) is a retired Soviet Olympic épée fencer who won four Olympic medals.

== Early life ==
Kriss was born in Kyiv, Ukraine, and is Jewish. He was an officer in the Red Army of the Soviet Union.

== Fencing career ==
He competed at the 1964 Olympics winning a gold medal in Individual Épée, the 1968 Olympics winning silver medals in both Individual Épée and Team Épée, and the 1972 Olympics winning a bronze medal in Team Épée.

At the World Championships he won the Individual Épée silver medal in 1967, the Individual Épée gold medal in 1971, and four World Team Épée medals: a bronze in 1965, a silver in 1966, a gold in 1969, and a silver in 1971.

== Hall of Fame ==
Kriss was inducted into the International Jewish Sports Hall of Fame in 1989.

== Life outside competitive fencing ==
He was a physical education teacher, and a fencing coach.

== See also ==
- List of select Jewish fencers
- List of Jewish Olympic medalists
