= Costică Bărăgan =

Romanian fencer

Personal information
- Born: 2 May 1949 Bucharest, Romania
- Died: 2 February 2021 (aged 71)
- Height: 1.82 m (6 ft 0 in)
- Weight: 74 kg (163 lb)

Fencing career
- Sport: Fencing
- Country: Romania
- Weapon: épée
- Club: CSA Steaua București

Costică Bărăgan (2 May 1949 – 2 February 2021) was a Romanian fencer. He competed at the 1972 and 1980 Summer Olympics.
