= Alexandru Istrate =

Romanian fencer

Personal information
- Born: 8 May 1947 (age 79) Bucharest, Romania

Sport
- Sport: Fencing

Alexandru Istrate (born 8 May 1947) is a Romanian fencer. He competed in the individual and team épée events at the 1972 Summer Olympics.
