= Jacques Ladègaillerie =

French fencer (born 1940)

Personal information
- Born: 10 January 1940 (age 86) Sartrouville, Yvelines, France

Sport
- Sport: Fencing
Medal record
Men's fencing
Representing France
Olympic Games
Silver medal – second place	1972 Munich	Épée, individual
Mediterranean Games
Gold medal – first place	1967 Tunis	Individual épée

Jacques Ladègaillerie (French pronunciation: [ʒak ladeɡajʁi]; born 10 January 1940) is a French fencer. He won a gold medal in the individual épée event at the 1967 Mediterranean Games and a silver medal in the individual épée event at the 1972 Summer Olympics.
