= Sergey Paramonov =

Soviet fencer

Personal information
- Born: 16 September 1945 (age 80) Beloretsk, Soviet Union

Sport
- Sport: Fencing
Medal record
Representing Soviet Union
Olympic Games
Bronze medal – third place	1972 Munich	Team épée
World Championships
Gold medal – first place	1969 Havana	Team épée
Silver medal – second place	1970 Ankara	Individual épée
Silver medal – second place	1971 Vienna	Team épée
Bronze medal – third place	1973 Gothenburg	Team épée
Summer Universiade
Gold medal – first place	1970 Turin	Individual épée
Gold medal – first place	1973 Moscow	Team épée

Sergey Paramonov (Russian: Серге́й Владимирович Парамонов; born 16 September 1945) is a Soviet fencer. He won a bronze medal in the team épée event at the 1972 Summer Olympics.
