= Igor Valetov =

Soviet fencer

Personal information
- Born: 1 February 1946 (age 80)

Sport
- Sport: Fencing
Medal record
Men's fencing
Representing Soviet Union
Olympic Games
Bronze medal – third place	1972 Munich	Épée, team

Igor Valetov (Russian: Игорь Анатольевич Валетов; born 1 February 1946 in Tashkent, Uzbek SSR) is a Soviet fencer. He won a bronze medal in the team épée event at the 1972 Summer Olympics.
