= Orvar Jönsson =

Swedish fencer

Personal information
- Born: 5 September 1950 (age 75) Malmö, Sweden

Sport
- Sport: Fencing

Orvar Jönsson (born 5 September 1950) is a Swedish fencer. He competed in the individual and team épée events at the 1972 Summer Olympics.
