= 50 meter running target mixed =

Sport shooting event

Men
- Number of shots: 2x20
- World Championships: Since 1970
- Abbreviation: 50RTMIX

50 meter running target mixed is an ISSF shooting event, shot with a .22-calibre rifle at a target depicting a boar moving sideways across a 10-meter wide opening. A part of the ISSF World Shooting Championships since 1970, it differs from 50 meter running target in that the slow runs (target visible for 5 seconds) and the fast runs (target visible for 2.5 seconds) are randomized so the shooter does not know in advance which speed to expect.

== World Championships, Men ==
Year	Place	Gold	Silver	Bronze
1970	(United States) Phoenix	Göte Gåård (SWE)	Valeri Postoianov (URS)	Jogan Nikitin (URS)
1973	(Australia) Melbourne	Valeri Postoianov (URS)	Alexander Kediarov (URS)	Helmut Bellingrodt (COL)
1974	(Switzerland) Bern	Valeri Postoianov (URS)	Alexander Kediarov (URS)	Alexander Gazov (URS)
1978	(South Korea) Seoul	Giovanni Mezzani (ITA)	Guenther Danne (FRG)	Ezio Cini (ITA)
1979	(Austria) Linz	Alexander Gazov (URS)	Igor Sokolov (URS)	Gyula Szabó (HUN)
1981	(Argentina) Mala	Aleksei Rudnizkiy (URS)	Alexander Ivanchikhin (URS)	Tibor Bodnar (HUN)
1982	(Venezuela) Caracas	Nikolai Dedov (URS)	Yuri Kadenatsy (URS)	Jerzy Greszkiewicz (POL)
1983	(Canada) Edmonton	Sergei Savostianov (URS)	Nikolai Dedov (URS)	Jerzy Greszkiewicz (POL)
1986	(East Germany) Suhl	Attila Solti (HUN)	Shiping Huang (CHN)	Yuwei Li (CHN)
1990	(Soviet Union) Moscow	Ronghui Zhang (CHN)	Gennadi Avramenko (URS)	Manfred Kurzer (GDR)
1994	(Italy) Milan	Lubos Racansky (CZE)	Gennadi Avramenko (UKR)	Miroslav Janus (CZE)
2002	(Finland) Lahti	Jozsef Sike (HUN)	Emil Martinsson (SWE)	Lubomir Pelach (SVK)
2006	(Croatia) Zagreb	Lukasz Czapla (POL)	Peter Pelach (SVK)	Bedrich Jonas (CZE)
2008	(Czech Republic) Plzeň	Aleksandr Blinov (RUS)	Peter Pelach (SVK)	Alexander Zinenko (UKR)
2009	(Finland) Heinola	Maxim Stepanov (RUS)	Staffan Holmström (FIN)	Niklas Bergström (SWE)
2010	(Germany) Munich	Maxim Stepanov (RUS)	Miroslav Jurco (SVK)	Emil Martinsson (SWE)
2012	(Sweden) Stockholm	Jozsef Sike (HUN)	Emil Martinsson (SWE)	Krister Holmberg (FIN)
2014	(Spain) Granada	Lukasz Czapla (POL)	Emil Martinsson (SWE)	Jozsef Sike (HUN)
2016	(Germany) Suhl	Emil Martinsson (SWE)	Jesper Nyberg (SWE)	Park Myong-won (PRK)
2018	(South Korea) Changwon	Emil Martinsson (SWE)	Mikhail Azarenko (RUS)	Jesper Nyberg (SWE)
2022	(France) Châteauroux	Emil Martinsson (SWE)	Jesper Nyberg (SWE)	Ihor Kizyma (UKR)

== World Championships, Men team ==
Year	Place	Gold	Silver	Bronze
1970	(United States) Phoenix	(Sweden) Sweden; Göte Gåård; Runar Jakobsson; Stig Johansson; Martin Nordfors	(Soviet Union) Soviet Union; Andris Butsis; Alexander Farafonov; Jogan Nikitin; Valeri Postoianov	United States of America; Loyd Crow; Ted Mc Million; Frank Tossas; Robert Yeager
1973	(Australia) Melbourne	(Soviet Union) Soviet Union; Valeri Postoianov; Alexander Kediarov; Mati Jigi; Yakov Zhelezniak	(Sweden) Sweden; Göte Gåård; Karl Karlsson; Per-Anders Lingman; Martin Nordfors	United States of America; Charles Davis; Arlie Jones; Edmund Moeller; Louis Michael Theimer
1974	(Switzerland) Bern	(Soviet Union) Soviet Union; Alexander Gazov; Alexander Kediarov; Yakov Zhelezniak; Valeri Postoianov	(Hungary) Hungary; Tibor Bodnar; Zoltan Pelikan; Gyula Szabó; Janos Szekeres	(Sweden) Sweden; Lars Ivarsson; Karl Karlsson; Per-Anders Lingman; Gunnar Svensson
1978	(South Korea) Seoul	(Italy) Italy; Ezio Cini; Giovanni Mezzani; Italo Mari; Fiorenzo Zanella	(West Germany) Federal Republic of Germany; Guenther Danne; Wolfgang Hamberger; Thomas Lederer; Christoph-Michael Zeisner	(Finland) Finland; Martti Eskelinen; Jorma Lievonen; Juha Rannikko; Matti Saeteri
1979	(Austria) Linz	(Soviet Union) Soviet Union; Alexander Gazov; Mati Jigi; Alexander Kediarov; Igor Sokolov	(Hungary) Hungary; Tibor Bodnar; Andras Doleschall; Gyula Szabó; Janos Szekeres	(Sweden) Sweden; Lars Ivarsson; Harry Johansson; Karl Karlsson; Martin Nordvors
1981	(Argentina) Mala	(Soviet Union) Soviet Union; Aleksei Rudnizkiy; Alexander Ivanchikhin; Yuri Kadenatsy; Igor Sokolov	(Hungary) Hungary; Tibor Bodnar; Zoltan Keczeli; Andras Doleschall; Kalman Kovacs	(China) People's Republic of China; Jiping Yu; Chu Gang; Zhongyuan Wang; Yili Xie
1982	(Venezuela) Caracas	(Soviet Union) Soviet Union; Nikolai Dedov; Alexander Ivanchikhin; Yuri Kadenatsy; Sergei Savostianov	(Hungary) Hungary; Andras Doleschall; Zoltan Keczeli; Kalman Kovacs; Istvan Peni	(Finland) Finland; Heikki Koskinen; Jorma Lievonen; Matti Saeteri; Timo Vuchensilta
1983	(Canada) Edmonton	(Soviet Union) Soviet Union; Nikolai Dedov; Yuri Kadenatsy; Sergei Savostianov	(Poland) Poland; Zygmunt Bogdziewicz; Jerzy Greszkiewicz; Eugeniusz Janczak	(China) People's Republic of China; Bin He; Zhongyuan Wang; Jiping Yu
1986	(East Germany) Suhl	(China) People's Republic of China; Shiping Huang; Yuwei Li; Yiming Yang	(Soviet Union) Soviet Union; Gennadi Avramenko; Sergei Luzov; Igor Sokolov	(Hungary) Hungary; Tibor Bodnar; Andras Doleschall; Attila Solti
1990	(Soviet Union) Moscow	(Soviet Union) Soviet Union; Anatoli Asrabaev; Gennadi Avramenko; Alexei Poslov	(China) People's Republic of China; Zhiyong Cai; Quingquan Shu; Ronghui Zhang	(Hungary) Hungary; Jozsef Angyan; Jozsef Sike; Attila Solti
1994	(Italy) Milan	(Czech Republic) Czech Republic; Miroslav Janus; Jan Kermiet; Lubos Racansky	(Russia) Russia; Anatoli Asrabaev; Alexander Konichev; Igor Kolesov	(China) People's Republic of China; Zhiyong Cai; Quingquan Shu; Jun Xiao
2002	(Finland) Lahti	(Czech Republic) Czech Republic; Miroslav Janus; Miroslav Lizal; Lubos Racansky	(Finland) Finland; Krister Holmberg; Vesa Saviahde; Pasi Wedman	(Russia) Russia; Aleksandr Blinov; Juri Ermolenko; Dimitri Lykin
2006	(Croatia) Zagreb	(Ukraine) Ukraine; Vladyslav Prianishnikov; Alexander Zinenko; Oleksandr Ulvak	(Russia) Russia; Dimitri Lykin; Igor Kolesov; Aleksandr Blinov	(Sweden) Sweden; Emil Martinsson; Niklas Bergstroem; Sami Pesonen
2008	(Czech Republic) Plzeň	(Czech Republic) Czech Republic; Bedrich Jonas; Lubos Racansky; Miroslav Janus	(Russia) Russia; Aleksandr Blinov; Igor Kolesov; Dmitry Romanov	(Sweden) Sweden; Emil Martinsson; Niklas Bergstroem; Mattias Bergman
2009	(Finland) Heinola	Russia	Finland	Czech Republic
2010	(Germany) Munich	Russia	Slovakia	Sweden
2012	(Sweden) Stockholm	Czech Republic	Ukraine	Russia
2014	(Spain) Granada	Sweden	Russia	Czech Republic
2016	(Germany) Suhl	Russia	Sweden	Hungary
2018	(South Korea) Changwon	Sweden	Russia	North Korea
2022	(France) Châteauroux	Event not held		

== World Championships, total medals ==
Rank	Nation	Gold	Silver	Bronze	Total
1	Soviet Union	13	10	2	25
2	Czech Republic	4	0	3	7
3	Russia	3	3	1	7
4	Sweden	3	2	5	10
5	Hungary	2	4	4	10
6	China	2	2	4	8
7	Italy	2	0	1	3
8	Poland	1	1	2	4
9	Ukraine	1	1	1	3
10	Finland	0	3	2	5
11	Slovakia	0	2	1	3
12	West Germany	0	2	0	2
13	United States	0	0	2	2
14	Colombia	0	0	1	1
14	East Germany	0	0	1	1
Totals (15 entries)		31	30	30	91

== Current world records ==
Current world records in 50 meter running target mixed
Men	Individual	398	Luboš Račanský (CZE)	August 4, 1994	Milan (ITA)
Men	Teams	1181	Czech Republic (Januš, Kermiet, Račanský)	August 4, 1994	Milan (ITA)
Junior Men	Individual	397	Michael Jakosits (FRG)	September 7, 1990	Zenica (YUG)
Junior Men	Individual	1167	East Germany (Hasse, Kleebauer, Kurzer)	September 7, 1990	Zenica (YUG)
