= 50 meter running target =

Sport shooting event

Men
- Number of shots: 2x30
- Olympic Games: 1972-1988
- World Championships: Since 1966
- Abbreviation: 50RT

50 meter running target or 50 meter running boar is an ISSF shooting event, shot with a .22-calibre rifle at a target depicting a boar moving sideways across a 10-meter wide opening. It was devised as a replacement for 100 meter running deer in the 1960s and made its way into the Olympic programme in 1972. Although replaced there by the airgun version, 10 meter running target, in 1992, it still is part of the ISSF World Shooting Championships and continental championships.

Just like in 10 meter running target, half of the runs are slow (target visible for 5 seconds), and half are fast (target visible for 2.5 seconds).

== World Championships, Men ==
Year	Place	Gold	Silver	Bronze
1966	(West Germany) Wiesbaden	Vladimir Vesselov (URS)	Jogan Nikitin (URS)	John Kingeter (USA)
1967	(Italy) Pistoia	Martin Nordfors (SWE)	Vladimir Vesselov (URS)	Stig Johansson (SWE)
1969	(Sweden) Sandviken	Martin Nordfors (SWE)	Valeri Postoianov (URS)	John Kingeter (USA)
1970	(United States) Phoenix	Göte Gåård (SWE)	Valeri Postoianov (URS)	Martin Nordfors (SWE)
1973	(Australia) Melbourne	Alexander Kediarov (URS)	Valeri Postoianov (URS)	Helmut Bellingrodt (COL)
1974	(Switzerland) Bern	Helmut Bellingrodt (COL)	Valeri Postoianov (URS)	Alexander Gazov (URS)
1975	(West Germany) Munich	Valeri Postoianov (URS)	Helmut Bellingrodt (COL)	Giovanni Mezzani (ITA)
1978	(South Korea) Seoul	Juha Rannikko (FIN)	John Mckinley Gough (GBR)	Carlos Rene Silva Monterroso (GUA)
1979	(Austria) Linz	Tibor Bodnar (HUN)	Andras Doleschall (HUN)	Juha Rannikko (FIN)
1981	(Argentina) Mala	Thomas Pfeffer (GDR)	Aleksei Rudnizkiy (URS)	Tibor Bodnar (HUN)
1982	(Venezuela) Caracas	Yuri Kadenatsy (URS)	Jerzy Greszkiewicz (POL)	Nikolai Dedov (URS)
1983	(Canada) Edmonton	Igor Sokolov (URS)	Tibor Bodnar (HUN)	Andras Doleschall (HUN)
1986	(East Germany) Suhl	Sergei Luzov (URS)	Jean Luc Tricoire (FRA)	Andras Doleschall (HUN)
1990	(Soviet Union) Moscow	Alexei Poslov (URS)	Manfred Kurzer (GDR)	Attila Solti (HUN)
1994	(Italy) Milan	Quingquan Shu (CHN)	Lubos Racansky (CZE)	Gennadi Avramenko (UKR)
2002	(Finland) Lahti	Maxim Stepanov (RUS)	Lubos Racansky (CZE)	Jozsef Sike (HUN)
2006	(Croatia) Zagreb	Lukasz Czapla (POL)	Miroslav Janus (CZE)	Peter Pelach (SVK)
2008	(Czech Republic) Plzeň	Krister Holmberg (FIN)	Maxim Stepanov (RUS)	Miroslav Janus (CZE)
2009	(Finland) Heinola	Maxim Stepanov (RUS)	Krister Holmberg (FIN)	Peter Pelach (SVK)
2010	(Germany) Munich	Emil Martinsson (SWE)	Maxim Stepanov (RUS)	Alexander Zinenko (UKR)
2012	(Sweden) Stockholm	Lukasz Czapla (POL)	Emil Martinsson (SWE)	Dmitry Romanov (RUS)
2014	(Spain) Granada	Event not held		
2016	(Germany) Suhl	Maxim Stepanov (RUS)	Mikhail Azarenko (RUS)	Emil Martinsson (SWE)
2018	(South Korea) Changwon	Mikhail Azarenko (RUS)	Lukasz Czapla (POL)	Tomi-Pekka Heikkilä (FIN)
2022	(France) Châteauroux	Ihor Kizyma (UKR)	Emil Martinsson (SWE)	Jozsef Sike (HUN)

== World Championships, Men Team ==
Year	Place	Gold	Silver	Bronze
1966	(West Germany) Wiesbaden	(Soviet Union) Soviet Union; Jogan Nikitin; Yakov Zhelezniak; Valerie Staratelev; Vladimir Vesselov	United States of America; Brown; Dean; John Kingeter; Edmund Moeller	(Sweden) Sweden; Bjoerklund; Göte Gåård; Goran Johansson; Martin Nordfors
1967	(Italy) Pistoia	(Soviet Union) Soviet Union; Andris Butsis; Jogan Nikitin; Valerie Staratelev; Vladimir Vesselov	(Sweden) Sweden; Göte Gåård; Runar Jakobsson; Stig Johansson; Martin Nordfors	United States of America; Dickens R. Klingeter J. Skarpness N. Robert Yeager
1969	(Sweden) Sandviken	(Soviet Union) Soviet Union; Andris Butsis; Jogan Nikitin; Valeri Postoianov; Valerie Staratelev	United States of America; Loyd Crow; John Kingeter; Ted Mc Million; Edmund Moeller	(Sweden) Sweden; Göte Gåård; Runar Jakobsson; Stig Johansson; Martin Nordfors
1970	(United States) Phoenix	(Soviet Union) Soviet Union; Andris Butsis; Jogan Nikitin; Valeri Postoianov; Valerie Staratelev	(Sweden) Sweden; Göte Gåård; Runar Jakobsson; Stig Johansson; Martin Nordfors	United States of America; Loyd Crow; Ted Mc Million; Frank Tossas; Robert Yeager
1973	(Australia) Melbourne	(Soviet Union) Soviet Union; Alexander Kediarov; Alexander Gazov; Valeri Postoianov; Yakov Zhelezniak	(Sweden) Sweden; Göte Gåård; Karl Karlsson; Per-Anders Lingman; Martin Nordfors	United States of America; Charles Davis; Arlie Jones; Edmund Moeller; Louis Michael Theimer
1974	(Switzerland) Bern	(Soviet Union) Soviet Union; Alexander Gazov; Yakov Zhelezniak; Alexander Kediarov; Valeri Postoianov	(West Germany) Federal Republic of Germany; Guenther Danne; Friedrich Christoffer; Wolfgang Hamberger; Christoph-Michael Zeisner	United States of America; Charles Davis; Arlie Jones; Edmund Moeller; Louis Michael Theimer
1975	(West Germany) Munich	(Soviet Union) Soviet Union; Alexander Kediarov; Matti Jõgi; Valeri Postoianov; Yakov Zhelezniak	(Hungary) Hungary; Tibor Bodnar; Jozsef Madai; Gyula Szabó; Janos Szekeres	(West Germany) Federal Republic of Germany; Guenther Danne; Wolfgang Hamberger; Thomas Lederer; Christoph-Michael Zeisner
1978	(South Korea) Seoul	(West Germany) Federal Republic of Germany; Guenther Danne; Wolfgang Hamberger; Thomas Lederer; Christoph-Michael Zeisner	United States of America; John Anderson; Charles Davis; James Reiber; Louis Michael Theimer	(Colombia) Colombia; Helmut Bellingrodt; Hernando Barrientos; Hanspeter Bellingrodt; Horst Bellingrodt
1979	(Austria) Linz	(Finland) Finland; Martti Eskelinen; Jorma Lievonen; Juha Rannikko; Matti Saeteri	(Hungary) Hungary; Tibor Bodnar; Andras Doleschall; Gyula Szabó; Janos Szekeres	(Soviet Union) Soviet Union; Alexander Gorodjankin; Alexander Gazov; Matti Jõgi; Alexander Kediarov
1981	(Argentina) Mala	(Soviet Union) Soviet Union; Aleksei Rudnizkiy; Igor Sokolov; Alexander Ivanchikhin; Yuri Kadenatsy	(Hungary) Hungary; Tibor Bodnar; Zoltan Keczeli; Andras Doleschall; Kalman Kovacs	(Sweden) Sweden; Lars Ivarsson; Johnny Modigh; Thomas Hagelberg; Harry Johansson
1982	(Venezuela) Caracas	(Soviet Union) Soviet Union; Nikolai Dedov; Alexander Ivanchikhin; Yuri Kadenatsy; Igor Sokolov	(Hungary) Hungary; Andras Doleschall; Zoltan Keczeli; Kalman Kovacs; Istvan Peni	(China) People's Republic of China; Bin He; Zhongyuan Wang; Yili Xie; Ji Ping Yu
1983	(Canada) Edmonton	(Soviet Union) Soviet Union; Andrei Dunaev; Yuri Kadenatsy; Igor Sokolov	(Hungary) Hungary; Tibor Bodnar; Andras Doleschall; Kalman Kovacs	(West Germany) Federal Republic of Germany; Thomas Lederer; Ludwig Montsko; Uwe Schroeder
1986	(East Germany) Suhl	(Soviet Union) Soviet Union; Gennadi Avramenko; Yuri Kadenatsy; Sergei Luzov	(Hungary) Hungary; Tibor Bodnar; Andras Doleschall; Attila Solti	(East Germany) German Democratic Republic; Thomas Pfeffer; Henry Risch; Tilo Weigel
1990	(Soviet Union) Moscow	(Hungary) Hungary; Jozsef Angyan; Jozsef Sike; Attila Solti	(Soviet Union) Soviet Union; Gennadi Avramenko; Anatoli Asrabaev; Alexei Poslov	(China) People's Republic of China; Quingquan Shu; Gang Ji; Ronghui Zhang
1994	(Italy) Milan	(China) People's Republic of China; Zhiyong Cai; Quingquan Shu; Jun Xiao	(Hungary) Hungary; Jozsef Angyan; Jozsef Sike; Tamas Tasi	(Germany) Germany; Michael Jakosits; Manfred Kurzer; Jens Zimmermann
2002	(Finland) Lahti	(Russia) Russia; Juri Ermolenko; Igor Kolesov; Maxim Stepanov	(Czech Republic) Czech Republic; Miroslav Janus; Miroslav Lizal; Lubos Racansky	(Finland) Finland; Krister Holmberg; Vesa Saviahde; Pasi Wedman
2006	(Croatia) Zagreb	(Czech Republic) Czech Republic; Miroslav Janus; Bedrich Jonas; Lubos Racansky	(Sweden) Sweden; Emil Martinsson; Sami Pesonen; Niklas Bergstroem	(Russia) Russia; Igor Kolesov; Dimitri Lykin; Maxim Stepanov
2008	(Czech Republic) Plzeň	(Czech Republic) Czech Republic; Miroslav Janus; Bedrich Jonas; Lubos Racansky	(Russia) Russia; Maxim Stepanov; Aleksandr Blinov; Igor Kolesov	(Ukraine) Ukraine; Alexander Zinenko; Vladyslav Prianishnikov; Oleksandr Ulvak
2009	(Finland) Heinola	Russia	Finland	Slovakia
2010	(Germany) Munich	Russia	Sweden	Slovakia
2012	(Sweden) Stockholm	Russia	Sweden	Ukraine
2014	(Spain) Granada	Event not held		
2016	(Germany) Suhl	Russia	Hungary	Czech Republic
2018	(South Korea) Changwon	Russia	Sweden	South Korea
2022	(France) Châteauroux	Event not held		

== World Championships, total medals ==
Rank	Nation	Gold	Silver	Bronze	Total
1	Soviet Union	18	8	3	29
2	Russia	4	2	1	7
3	Sweden	3	4	5	12
4	Finland	3	2	2	7
5	Hungary	2	9	5	16
6	Czech Republic	2	4	1	7
7	China	2	0	2	4
8	Colombia	1	1	2	4
8	East Germany	1	1	2	4
10	West Germany	1	1	1	3
11	Poland	1	1	0	2
12	United States	0	3	6	9
13	France	0	1	0	1
13	Great Britain	0	1	0	1
15	Slovakia	0	0	3	3
16	Ukraine	0	0	2	2
17	Argentina	0	0	1	1
17	Germany	0	0	1	1
17	Italy	0	0	1	1
Totals (19 entries)		38	38	38	114

== Current world records ==
Current world records in 50 meter running target
Men	Individual	596	Nikolai Lapin (URS); Maxim Stepanov (RUS)	July 25, 1987; August 29, 2009	Lahti (FIN); Heinola (FIN)
Men	Teams	1773	Soviet Union (Avramenko, Luzov, Vasilyeu)	July 7, 1989	Zagreb (YUG)
Junior Men	Individual	594	Manfred Kurzer (GDR)	August 12, 1990	Moscow (URS)
Junior Men	Teams	1758	Czechoslovakia (Januš, Pelach, Surovcek)	July 8, 1989	Zagreb (YUG)
