= 10 meter running target =

ISSF shooting event

Men
- Number of shots: 2 × 30
- Olympic Games: 1992–2004
- World Championships: 1981-2009
- Abbreviation: 10RT

Women
- Number of shots: 2 × 20
- World Championships: 1994-2009
- Abbreviation: 10RT20

Diagram of the targets used in 10 meter running target.

10 meter running target is one of the ISSF shooting events, shot with an airgun at a target that moves sideways. The target is pulled across a two meter wide aisle at the range of 10 meters from the firing point. The target is pulled at either of two speeds, slow or fast, where it is visible for 5 or 2.5 seconds, respectively.

The course of fire is 30 slow runs followed by 30 fast runs for men, and 20 slow runs followed by 20 fast runs for women.

The men's event replaced 50 meter running target on the Olympic program starting from 1992, but after the 2004 Summer Olympics it was again taken off the program, leaving the running target shooters with no Olympic events at all. This also meant that finals were no longer held, but it has been announced that a replacement will be held in the form of knockout semi-final and final stages. Also, a separate World Championship was held in 2008, filling the void left after the Olympics.

== World Championships, Men ==
This event was held in 1981–2009.

Year	Place	Gold	Silver	Bronze
1981	(Dominican Republic) Santo Domingo	Yuri Kadenatsy (URS)	Andrei Terekhin (URS)	Igor Malashkov (URS)
1982	(Venezuela) Caracas	Igor Sokolov (URS)	Sergei Savostianov (URS)	Alexander Ivanchikhin (URS)
1983	(Canada) Edmonton	Jean Luc Tricoire (FRA)	Igor Sokolov (URS)	Randy Stewart (USA)
1986	(East Germany) Suhl	Lubos Racansky (TCH)	Zygmunt Bogdziewicz (POL)	Sergei Luzov (URS)
1987	(Hungary) Budapest	Jean Luc Tricoire (FRA)	Lubos Racansky (TCH)	Alexander Zakharchenkov (URS)
1989	(Socialist Federal Republic of Yugoslavia) Sarajevo	Attila Solti (HUN)	Jozsef Angyan (HUN)	Jozsef Sike (HUN)
1990	(Soviet Union) Moscow	Manfred Kurzer (GDR)	Quingquan Shu (CHN)	Gennadi Avramenko (URS)
1991	(Norway) Stavanger	Lubos Racansky (TCH)	Gennadi Avramenko (URS)	Andrei Vasilyeu (URS)
1994	(Italy) Milan	Manfred Kurzer (GER)	Krister Holmberg (FIN)	Carlo Colombo (ITA)
1998	(Spain) Barcelona	Zhiyuan Niu (CHN)	Adam Saathoff (USA)	Igor Kolesov (RUS)
2002	(Finland) Lahti	Dimitri Lykin (RUS)	Ling Yang (CHN)	Adam Saathoff (USA)
2006	(Croatia) Zagreb	Zhiyuan Niu (CHN)	Aleksandr Blinov (RUS)	Miroslav Janus (CZE)
2008	(Czech Republic) Plzeň	Emil Martinsson (SWE)	Miroslav Janus (CZE)	Vladyslav Prianishnikov (UKR)
2009	(Finland) Heinola	Emil Martinsson (SWE)	Vladyslav Prianishnikov (UKR)	Dimitry Romanov (RUS)
2010	(Germany) Munich	Dmitry Romanov (RUS)	Zhai Yujia (CHN)	Krister Holmberg (FIN)
2012	(Sweden) Stockholm	Dmitry Romanov (RUS)	Łukasz Czapla (POL)	László Boros (HUN)
2014	(Spain) Granada	Emil Martinsson (SWE)	Zhai Yujia (CHN)	Dmitry Romanov (RUS)
2016	(Germany) Suhl	Maxim Stepanov (RUS)	Mikhail Azarenko (RUS)	Emil Martinsson (SWE)
2018	(South Korea) Changwon	Jesper Nyberg (SWE)	Maxim Stepanov (RUS)	Vladislav Prianishnikov (RUS)
2022	(France) Châteauroux	Emil Martinsson (SWE)	Ihor Kizyma (UKR)	Łukasz Czapla (POL)

== World Championships, Men Team ==
This event was held in 1981–2009.

Year	Place	Gold	Silver	Bronze
1981	(Dominican Republic) Santo Domingo	(Soviet Union) Soviet Union; Yuri Kadenatsy; Gennadi Malukhin; Igor Malashkov; Andrei Terekhin	United States of America; Francis Allen; Harry Lucker; Randy Stewart; Wypych P.	(Puerto Rico) Puerto Rico; Gonzalez R. Ortiz A. Pedro Ramirez; Llorens C.
1982	(Venezuela) Caracas	(Soviet Union) Soviet Union; Alexander Ivanchikhin; Yuri Kadenatsy; Sergei Savostianov; Igor Sokolov	(China) People's Republic of China; Bin He; Zhongyuan Wang; Ji Ping Yu; Yili Xie	United States of America; Todd Bensley; Michael English; Robert George; Randy Stewart
1983	(Canada) Edmonton	(Soviet Union) Soviet Union; Yuri Kadenatsy; Sergei Savostianov; Igor Sokolov	(France) France; Bernard Gasquet; Thierry Guiot; Jean Luc Tricoire	United States of America; Todd Bensley; Michael English; Randy Stewart
1986	(East Germany) Suhl	(Soviet Union) Soviet Union; Gennadi Avramenko; Sergei Luzov; Igor Malashkov	(Czechoslovakia) Czechoslovakia; Jan Kermiet; Lubos Racansky; Libor Tesar	United States of America; Todd Bensley; Michael English; Randy Stewart
1987	(Hungary) Budapest	(Czechoslovakia) Czechoslovakia; Jan Kermiet; Lubos Racansky; Libor Tesar	(Soviet Union) Soviet Union; Gennadi Avramenko; Nicolai Lapin; Alexander Zakharchenkov	United States of America; Todd Bensley; Michael English; Randy Stewart
1989	(Socialist Federal Republic of Yugoslavia) Sarajevo	(Hungary) Hungary; Jozsef Angyan; Jozsef Sike; Attila Solti	(Soviet Union) Soviet Union; Anatoli Asrabaev; Gennadi Avramenko; Eugeni Geht	(Czechoslovakia) Czechoslovakia; Jan Kermiet; Lubos Racansky; Jindrich Svoboda
1990	(Soviet Union) Moscow	(China) People's Republic of China; Zhiyong Cai; Quingquan Shu; Ronghui Zhang	(Hungary) Hungary; Jozsef Angyan; Jozsef Sike; Attila Solti	(West Germany) Federal Republic of Germany; Peter Meserth; Michael Jakosits; Jens Zimmermann
1991	(Norway) Stavanger	(Soviet Union) Soviet Union; Gennadi Avramenko; Andrei Romanov; Andrei Vasilyeu	(Germany) Germany; Michael Jakosits; Peter Meserth; Jens Zimmermann	(Hungary) Hungary; Jozsef Angyan; Jozsef Sike; Attila Solti
1994	(Italy) Milan	(Czech Republic) Czech Republic; Jan Kermiet; Miroslav Janus; Lubos Racansky	United States of America; Roy Hill; Adam Saathoff; Lonn Saunders	(Hungary) Hungary; Jozsef Angyan; Tamas Burkus; Jozsef Sike
1998	(Spain) Barcelona	(Finland) Finland; Pasi Wedman; Krister Holmberg; Vesa Saviahde	(Germany) Germany; Manfred Kurzer; Michael Jakosits; Jens Zimmermann	(Russia) Russia; Igor Kolesov; Dimitri Lykin; Alexander Ivanov
2002	(Finland) Lahti	(Germany) Germany; Marko Schulze; Manfred Kurzer; Michael Jakosits	(Russia) Russia; Dimitri Lykin; Igor Kolesov; Aleksandr Blinov	(China) People's Republic of China; Ling Yang; Guobin Zeng; Zhiyuan Niu
2006	(Croatia) Zagreb	(Russia) Russia; Aleksandr Blinov; Maxim Stepanov; Dimitri Lykin	(China) People's Republic of China; Zhiyuan Niu; Lin Gan; Weijian Zhang	(Sweden) Sweden; Emil Martinsson; Sami Pesonen; Niklas Bergstroem
2008	(Czech Republic) Plzeň	(Ukraine) Ukraine; Vladyslav Prianishnikov; Andrey Gilchenko; Alexander Zinenko	(Czech Republic) Czech Republic; Miroslav Janus; Bedrich Jonas; Lubos Racansky	(Russia) Russia; Maxim Stepanov; Igor Kolesov; Dmitry Romanov
2009	(Finland) Heinola	Russia	Czech Republic	Ukraine
2010	(Germany) Munich	Russia	China	Ukraine
2012	(Sweden) Stockholm	Czech Republic	Ukraine	Russia
2014	(Sweden) Stockholm	Russia	China	Hungary
2016	(Germany) Suhl	Finland	Sweden	Russia
2018	(South Korea) Changwon	Russia	North Korea	Sweden
2022	(France) Châteauroux	Sweden	Hungary	Finland

== World Championships, Women ==
This event was held in 1994–2009.

Year	Place	Gold	Silver	Bronze
1994	(Italy) Milan	Moon Sun Kim (KOR)	Csilla Madari (HUN)	Ann Sjoekvist (FIN)
1998	(Spain) Barcelona	Natalya Kovalenko (KAZ)	Xing Xu (CHN)	Xia Wang (CHN)
2002	(Finland) Lahti	Xuan Xu (CHN)	Xia Wang (CHN)	Natalya Kovalenko (KAZ)
2006	(Croatia) Zagreb	Audrey Corenflos (FRA)	Aiwen Sun (CHN)	Viktoriya Zabolotna (UKR)
2008	(Czech Republic) Plzeň	Galina Avramenko (UKR)	Julia Eydenzon (RUS)	Elena Neff (GER)
2009	(Finland) Heinola	Galina Avramenko (UKR)	Tetyana Yevseyenko (UKR)	Viktoriya Zabolotna (UKR)
2010	(Germany) Munich	Li Xueyan (CHN)	Zhao Li Li (CHN)	Irina Izmalkova (RUS)
2012	(Sweden) Stockholm	Yang Zeng (CHN)	Li Xueyan (CHN)	Irina Izmalkova (RUS)
2014	(Spain) Granada	Julia Eydenzon (RUS)	Viktoriya Rybovalova (UKR)	Olga Stepanova (RUS)
2016	(Germany) Suhl	Galina Avramenko (UKR)	Julia Eydenzon (RUS)	Zhao Li Li (CHN)
2018	(South Korea) Changwon	Olga Stepanova (RUS)	Li Xueyan (CHN)	Galina Avramenko (UKR)
2022	(France) Châteauroux	Viktoriya Rybovalova (UKR)	Galina Avramenko (UKR)	Lilit Mkrtchyan (ARM)

== World Championships, Women Team ==
This event was held in 1998–2006.

Year	Place	Gold	Silver	Bronze
1998	(Spain) Barcelona	(China) People's Republic of China; Xing Xu; Xia Wang; Miao Liu	(Germany) Germany; Silke Johannes; Jacqueline Ramnick; Martina Ganslmeier	(Russia) Russia; Irina Izmalkova; Elena Korableva; Irina Makhoukha
2002	(Finland) Lahti	(China) People's Republic of China; Xuan Xu; Xia Wang; Zhiqi Qiu	(Ukraine) Ukraine; Galina Avramenko; Ganna Neustroyeva; Kateryna Samohina	(Russia) Russia; Irina Izmalkova; Elena Korableva; Anait Gasparyan
2006	(Croatia) Zagreb	(China) People's Republic of China; Aiwen Sun; Qijue Wang; Xuan Xu	(Ukraine) Ukraine; Viktoriya Zabolotna; Galina Avramenko; Kateryna Samohina	(Russia) Russia; Anna Ilina; Irina Izmalkova; Julia Eydenzon
2008	(Czech Republic) Plzeň	No team event		
2009	(Finland) Heinola	No team event		
2010	(Germany) Munich	China	Russia	Ukraine
2012	(Croatia) Zagreb	China	Russia	Ukraine
2014	(Spain) Granada	China	Russia	Ukraine
2016	(Germany) Suhl	China	Russia	Ukraine
2018	(South Korea) Changwon	China	North Korea	Russia
2022	(France) Châteauroux	No team event		

== World Championships, total medals ==
Rank	Nation	Gold	Silver	Bronze	Total
1	Soviet Union	7	7	5	19
2	China	7	7	2	16
3	Czechoslovakia	4	1	1	6
4	Ukraine	3	4	4	11
5	Russia	3	3	7	13
6	Hungary	2	3	3	8
7	Germany	2	3	1	6
8	France	2	1	0	3
9	Sweden	2	0	1	3
10	Czech Republic	1	3	1	5
11	Finland	1	1	1	3
12	Kazakhstan	1	0	1	2
13	East Germany	1	0	0	1
13	South Korea	1	0	0	1
15	United States	0	3	6	9
16	Poland	0	1	0	1
17	Italy	0	0	1	1
17	Norway	0	0	1	1
17	Puerto Rico	0	0	1	1
17	West Germany	0	0	1	1
Totals (20 entries)		37	37	37	111

== Current world records ==
Current world records in 10 meter running target
Men	Individual	590	Manfred Kurzer (GER); Zhai Yujia (CHN)	August 18, 2004; November 16, 2010	Athens (GRE); Guangzhou (CHN)
Men	Teams	1739	Russia (Shchepotkin, Prianishnikov, Stepanov)	March 10, 2017	Maribor (SLO)
Junior Men	Individual	590	Zhai Yujia (CHN)	November 16, 2010	Guangzhou (CHN)
Junior Men	Teams	1708	Finland (Suoranta, Kinisjarvi, Lahdekorpi)	March 5, 2014	Moscow (RUS)
Women	Individual	575	Li Xueyan (CHN)	September 9, 2018	Changwon (KOR)
Women	Teams	1673	China (Li, Su, Huang)	September 9, 2018	Changwon (KOR)
Junior Women	Individual	557	Kensiia Anufrieva (RUS)	February 28, 2020	Wrocław (POL)
Junior Women	Teams	1605	Kazakhstan (Irnazarova F., Saduakassova, Irnazarova Z.)	November 10, 2019	Doha (QAT)

== World and Olympic Champions ==
=== Men ===
Year	Venue	Individual	Individual	Junior men	
Year	Venue	Individual	Individual	Individual	Team
1981	Santo Domingo	Yuri Kadenatsy (URS)	Soviet Union		
1982	Caracas	Igor Sokolov (URS)	Soviet Union		
1983	Edmonton	Jean-Luc Tricoire (FRA)	Soviet Union		
1986	Suhl	Luboš Račanský (TCH)	Soviet Union		
1987	Budapest	Luboš Račanský (TCH)	Czechoslovakia		
1989	Sarajevo	Attila Solti (HUN)	Hungary	Miroslav Januš (TCH)	Czechoslovakia
1990	Moscow	Manfred Kurzer (GDR)	China		
1991	Stavanger	Luboš Račanský (TCH)	Soviet Union	Miroslav Januš (TCH)	Czechoslovakia
1992	Barcelona	Michael Jakosits (GER)			
1994	Milan	Manfred Kurzer (GER)	Czech Republic	Peter Planovsky (SVK)	Slovakia
1996	Atlanta	Yang Ling (CHN)			
1998	Barcelona	Niu Zhiyuan (CHN)	Finland	Wang Dengjie (CHN)	Ukraine
2000	Sydney	Yang Ling (CHN)			
2002	Lahti	Dimitri Lykin (RUS)	Germany	Gan Lin (CHN)	Russia
2004	Athens	Manfred Kurzer (GER)			
2006	Zagreb	Niu Zhiyuan (CHN)	Russia	Dimitri Romanov (RUS)	Russia
2008	Plzeň	Emil Martinsson (SWE)	Ukraine	László Boros (HUN)	Russia
2009	Heinola	Emil Martinsson (SWE)	Russia	Mikhail Azarenko (RUS)	Russia

=== Women ===
Year	Venue	Individual	Team	Junior women	
Year	Venue	Individual	Team	Individual	Team
1994	Milan	Kim Moon-sun (KOR)		Silke Johannes (GER)	
1998	Barcelona	Natalya Kovalenko (KAZ)	China	Audrey Soquet (FRA)	Belarus
2002	Lahti	Xu Xuan (CHN)	China	Volha Markava (BLR)	Russia
2006	Zagreb	Audrey Corenflos (FRA)	China	Anne Weigel (GER)	Germany
2008	Plzeň	Galina Avramenko (UKR)		Bianka Keczeli (HUN)	Ukraine
2009	Heinola	Galina Avramenko (UKR)		Valentyna Gontcharova (UKR)	
