= List of national shooting records surpassing the world records =

This list of national shooting records surpassing the world records is possible because of the International Shooting Sport Federation's rigid record regulations. Only competitions directly supervised by the ISSF – Olympic Games, World Championships, World Cups, World Cup Finals and continental championships – are approved for setting world records. On the other hand, most member federations have more relaxed rules for their national records. This creates many more opportunities for record-breaking, especially so in the non-Olympic events, where World Cups are not held.

Certain ISSF shooting events (men's 300 metre rifle prone, trap (qualification) and skeet and women's trap (qualification)), are not listed below because the world record is unbeatable with a perfect score.

Rifle - Pistol - Shotgun - Running target

== Rifle events ==
=== Men ===
300 metre rifle three positions
1190	WR	
300 metre standard rifle
593	United States	Jason Parker (2005)
592	Sweden	Karl Olsson (2017)
591	WR	
50 metre rifle three positions (qualification)
1188	WR	
50 metre rifle three positions (final)
470.5	India	Aishwary Tomar (2025)
466.0	WR	
50 metre rifle prone
633.0	WR	
10 metre air rifle (qualification)
637.1	Hungary	Zalan Pekler (2020)
635.4	WR	
10 metre air rifle (final)
254.0	Hungary	Istvan Peni (2017)
254.5	WR	

=== Women ===
300 metre rifle three positions
1181	WR	
300 metre rifle prone
600	Denmark	Charlotte Jakobsen (2003)
600	Switzerland	Silvia Guignard (2019)
599	WR	
50 metre rifle three positions (qualification)
1188	Norway	Jenny Stene (2019)
1185	WR	
50 metre rifle three positions (final)
464.7	WR	
50 metre rifle prone
628.5	WR	
10 metre air rifle (qualification)
635.3	WR	
10 metre air rifle (final)
254.9	Switzerland	Nina Christen (2020)
253.9	India	Anjum Moudgil (2019)
254.8	WR	

== Pistol events ==
=== Men ===
50 metre pistol (qualification)
583	WR	
50 metre pistol (final)
200.7	WR	
25 metre rapid fire pistol (qualification)
593	WR	
25 metre rapid fire pistol (final)
38	WR	
25 metre center-fire pistol
597	Turkey	Yusuf Dikeç (2006)
596	Norway	Pål Hembre (2000)
595	WR	
25 metre standard pistol
592	United States	Darius Young (1978)
588	Finland	Paavo Palokangas (1991)
587	China	Cheng Zhongping (1993)
587	South Korea	
586	Belarus	Igor Bakalov (1982)
586	Norway	Pål Hembre (1993)
586	Italy	
585	India	Jaspal Rana (1995)
584	WR	
10 metre air pistol (qualification)
594	WR	
10 metre air pistol (final)
246.5	WR	

=== Women ===
25 metre pistol (qualification)
595	Sweden	Kristina Fries (1991)
594	WR	
25 metre pistol (final)
41	Switzerland	Heidi Diethelm Gerber (2019)
40	WR	
10 metre air pistol (qualification)
588	India	Manu Bhaker (2019)
587	WR	
10 metre air pistol (final)
246.9	WR	

== Shotgun events ==
=== Men ===
Trap (final)
48	WR	
Double trap (qualification)
149	United States	Walton Eller (2007)
148	WR	

=== Women ===
Trap (final)
48	WR
Double trap
136	WR
Skeet (qualification)
124	WR
Skeet (final)
59	WR

== Running target events ==
=== Men ===
50 metre running target
598	Belarus	Nikolai Dedov (1984)
598	Czech Republic	Miroslav Januš (2000)
598	Sweden	Emil Martinsson (2004)
597	Hungary	Attila Solti (1983)
597	Slovakia	Ľubomir Pelach (1999)
597	Poland	Łukasz Czapla (2006)
596	WR	
50 metre running target mixed
398	WR	
10 metre running target
594	Poland	Łukasz Czapla (2008)
592	Hungary	József Sike (2002)
591	Czech Republic	Luboš Račanský (1994)
591	Germany	Manfred Kurzer (1999)
590	WR	
10 metre running target mixed
396	Ukraine	Youri Yourasov (2000)
394	Poland	Łukasz Czapla (2005)
393	WR	

=== Women ===
10 metre running target
575	WR	
10 metre running target mixed
394	France	Audrey Soquet (2003)
391	WR	
