= 1978 World Shooting Championships =

- Host city: Seoul, South Korea
- Level: Senior
- Events: 52

The 1978 World Shooting Championships was the 42nd edition of the global shooting competition World Shooting Championships, organised by the International Shooting Sport Federation.

== Results ==
=== Men individual ===
Year	Gold			Silver			Bronze		
Year	Athlete	Country	Pts	Athlete	Country	Pts	Athlete	Country	Pts
300 m rifle 3 positions	Lones Wigger	United States	1160	Juhani Laakso	Finland	1155	Kuno Bertschy	Switzerland	1151
300 m free rifle prone	Walter Inderbitzin	Switzerland	399	Lones Wigger	United States	398	Tore Hartz	Norway	398
300 m free rifle kneeling	Kuno Bertschy	Switzerland	391	Tore Hartz	Norway	390	Juhani Laakso	Finland	389
300 m free rifle standing	Malcolm Cooper	United Kingdom	379	Robert Cheyne	Canada	376	Lones Wigger	United States	375
300 m standard rifle	David Kimes	United States	577	Yves Prouzet	France	574	Malcolm Cooper	United Kingdom	573
50 m rifle 3 positions	Lanny Bassham	United States	1165	Malcolm Cooper	United Kingdom	1159	Ulrich Lind	West Germany	1158
50 m rifle prone	Alister Allan	United Kingdom	599	Lones Wigger	United States	598	Lanny Bassham	United States	598
50 m free rifle kneeling	John Churchill	United Kingdom	390	Charles Jermann	Switzerland	390	Barry Dagger	United Kingdom	390
50 m free rifle standing	Esbjörn Svensson	Sweden	379	Seo Jang-Woon	South Korea	376	Lanny Bassham	United States	376
10 m air rifle	Oswald Schlipf	West Germany	390	Barry Dagger	United Kingdom	386	Giuseppe Zuccoli	Italy	385
50 m pistol	Moritz Minder	Switzerland	577	Ragnar Skanåker	Sweden	569	Karl Westphalen	West Germany	565
25 m rapid fire pistol	Ove Gunnarsson	Sweden	595	Werner Beier	West Germany	595	Gerhard Petritsch	Austria	594
25 m center fire pistol	Seppo Mäkinen	Finland	592	Park Jong-Jil	South Korea	588	Seppo Saarenpää	Finland	588
25 m standard pistol	Ragnar Skanåker	Sweden	583	Seppo Saarenpää	Finland	580	Hannu Paavola	Finland	577
10 m air pistol	Paavo Palokangas	Finland	391	Seppo Saarenpää	Finland	390	Paulo Lamego	Brazil	388
50 m running target	Juha Rannikko	Finland	572	John Gough	United Kingdom	570	Carlos Silva Monterroso	Guatemala	566
50 m running target mixed	Giovanni Mezzani	Italy	387	Gunther Danne	West Germany	384	Ezio Cini	Italy	383
Trap	Eladio Vallduví	Spain	198	Silvano Basagni	Italy	197	Eli Ellis	Australia	195
Skeet	Luciano Benetti	Italy	197	Firmo Emilio Roberti	Argentina	193	Romano Garagnani	Italy	193

=== Men team ===
Year	Gold		Silver		Bronze	
Year	Country	Pts	Country	Pts	Country	Pts
300 m rifle 3 positions	United States	4577	Switzerland	4573	Finland	4573
300 m free rifle prone	United States	1575	Finland	1575	Switzerland	1574
300 m free rifle kneeling	Switzerland	1537	United States	1531	Finland	1526
300 m free rifle standing	United States	1473	Switzerland	1462	Finland	1452
300 m standard rifle	United States	2281	Switzerland	2258	Finland	2251
50 m rifle 3 positions	United States	4604	West Germany	4598	Sweden	4587
50 m rifle prone	United States	2379	West Germany	2378	Switzerland	2364
50 m free rifle kneeling	United Kingdom	1542	West Germany	1538	Austria	1536
50 m free rifle standing	United States	1486	West Germany	1481	Sweden	1476
10 m air rifle	West Germany	1531	United States	1511	South Korea	1510
50 m pistol	Switzerland	2203	Japan	2202	West Germany	2200
25 m rapid fire pistol	West Germany	2366	Italy	2353	Sweden	2353
25 m center fire pistol	Finland	2347	Switzerland	2343	Sweden	2334
25 m standard pistol	Finland	2297	Italy	2280	Switzerland	2276
10 m air pistol	Finland	1531	Brazil	1530	Sweden	1529
50 m running target	West Germany	1493	United States	1484	Colombia	1484
50 m running target mixed	Italy	1517	West Germany	1504	Finland	1498
Trap	United States	580	Japan	576	Spain	576
Skeet	Italy	578	France	571	Sweden	571

== Medal table ==
#	Country	1st place, gold medalist(s)	2nd place, silver medalist(s)	3rd place, bronze medalist(s)	Tot.
1	United States	18	9	6	33
2	Finland	6	4	9	19
3	Italy	6	4	3	13
4	West Germany	5	7	5	17
5	Switzerland	5	6	4	15
6	Sweden	5	3	7	15
7	United Kingdom	4	3	2	9
8	Spain	1	1	2	4
9	Canada	1	1	0	2
10	Denmark	1	0	0	1
11	France	0	4	1	5
12	South Korea	0	3	5	8
13	Australia	0	2	2	4
14	Japan	0	2	0	2
15	Brazil	0	1	1	2
15	Norway	0	1	1	2
17	Argentina	0	1	0	1
18	Austria	0	0	2	2
19	Colombia	0	0	1	1
19	Guatemala	0	0	1	1
	TOTAL	52	52	52	156

== See also ==
- Trap World Champions
- Skeet World Champions
