= Shooting at the 1980 Summer Olympics – Mixed 50 metre running target =

Sports shooting at the Olympics

Mixed 50 metre running target at the Games of the XXII Olympiad
- Venue: Moscow, Soviet Union
- Date: 23–24 July 1980
- Competitors: 19 from 10 nations

Medalists
1st place, gold medalist(s)		Igor Sokolov	Soviet Union
2nd place, silver medalist(s)		Thomas Pfeffer	East Germany
3rd place, bronze medalist(s)		Aleksandr Gazov	Soviet Union

The mixed 50 metre running target was a shooting sports event held as part of the Shooting at the 1980 Summer Olympics programme. It was the third appearance of the event. The competition was held on 23 to 24 July 1980 at the shooting ranges in Moscow. 19 shooters from 10 nations competed.

== Results ==
Place	Shooter	Total
1	Igor Sokolov (URS)	589
2	Thomas Pfeffer (GDR)	589
3	Aleksandr Gazov (URS)	587
4	András Doleschall (HUN)	584
5	Tibor Bodnár (HUN)	584
6	Jorma Lievonen (FIN)	584
7	Giovanni Mezzani (ITA)	582
8	Hans-Jürgen Helbig (GDR)	579
9	Jo Song-nam (PRK)	576
10	Jerzy Greszkiewicz (POL)	576
11	Han In-sok (PRK)	574
12	Juha Rannikko (FIN)	573
13	Lars Ivarsson (SWE)	567
14	Bohumír Pokorný (TCH)	564
15	Arturo Iglesias (GUA)	561
16	Italo Mari (ITA)	557
17	Eugeniusz Janczak (POL)	555
18	Jiří Bachroň (TCH)	554
19	Carlos Silva (GUA)	543
