= Koby Holland =

American sports shooter (born 1974)

Personal information
- Full name: Koby Holland
- Nationality: United States
- Born: September 24, 1974 (age 51) Dillon, Montana, U.S.
- Height: 1.84 m (6 ft 1/2 in)
- Weight: 85 kg (187 lb)

Sport
- Sport: Shooting
- Events: 10 m running target (10RT); 50 m running target (50RT)
- Coached by: Sergey Luzov

Koby Holland (born September 24, 1974, in Dillon, Montana) is an American sport shooter. He has competed for Team USA in running target shooting at the 2004 Summer Olympics, and has won a bronze medal at the 2001 Championship of the Americas tournament in Fort Benning, Georgia. A resident athlete of the United States Olympic Training Center, Holland trains under Belarusian-born coach Sergey Luzov for the America's national running target team.

Holland qualified for the U.S. shooting team in the men's 10 m running target at the 2004 Summer Olympics in Athens. He occupied one of the top two berths to join with fellow marksman and three-time Olympian Adam Saathoff at the national trials, having registered a minimum qualifying standard of 566. Virtually unknown to the world scene, Holland showed off his best to shoot 281 on the slow-target portion and a lowly 270 in the fast-moving round throughout the series, shutting out the final to a distant eighteenth with a total score of 551 points.
