= Adam Saathoff =

American sports shooter

Personal information
- Full name: Adam Christophe Saathoff
- Nationality: United States
- Born: 25 May 1975 (age 51) Sierra Vista, Arizona, United; States
- Height: 1.80 m (5 ft 11 in)
- Weight: 79 kg (174 lb)

Sport
- Sport: Shooting
- Events: 10 m running target (10RT); 50 m running target (50RT)
- Coached by: Sergey Luzov
Medal record
Men's shooting
Representing the United States
World Championships
Silver medal – second place	1998 Barcelona	10RT
Bronze medal – third place	2002 Lahti	10RT

Adam Christophe Saathoff (born May 25, 1975, in Sierra Vista, Arizona) is an American sport shooter. He has competed for Team USA in running target shooting at three Olympics (1996 to 2004), and has been close to an Olympic final in 2004 (finishing in eighth place). Outside his Olympic career, Saathoff has won a total of five medals in a major international competition, spanning the ISSF World Cup series and the World Championships. A resident athlete of the United States Olympic Training Center, Saathoff trains under Belarusian-born coach Sergey Luzov for the America's national running target team.

== Career ==
Saathoff started out his shooting career as a successful junior in 1992 (aged 14), when he had won a small-bore silhouette match title at the Arizona State Championships, and eventually set numerous course records at every shooting range in Arizona. Two years later, Saathoff was invited to attend a shooters' clinic at the United States Olympic Training Center in Colorado Springs, Colorado, where he instilled in shooting Olympic-style running targets with an air rifle. On that same year, he honed his running target skills to the international scene by gaining the World Cup title at Fort Benning, Georgia, and coming close to the podium in fourth place at the World Championships in Milan, Italy.

Saathoff made his U.S. Olympic debut at the 1996 Summer Olympics in Atlanta by finishing first among his fellow marksmen and tied for fifth overall at a test event through the World Cup series, earning the lone Olympic berth for the host nation in running target shooting. A newcomer to the Olympic scene, Saathoff could not mount enough pressure to beat against the world's best running target shooters in front of a partisan crowd, rounding off the 20-shooter field to a dead last at 555 points.

Under the tutelage of Belarusian-born coach Sergey Luzov, Saathoff began training with him shortly after the Games to further improve his craft and mettle towards a major world-shooting competition. In 1998, Saathoff came from nowhere to stun the entire field of expert shooters in the 10-metre running target, as he surprisingly won the silver medal with a score of 677.9, but could not chase China's Olympic bronze medalist Niu Zhiyuan for the title by just nine tenths of a point.

Heading back to his second Olympics in Sydney 2000, Saathoff continued to dominate at the national trials, and watched his fellow marksman Lance Dement earning the other berth to join with him on the U.S. shooting team. At the Games, he shot a modest 570 to force in a three-way tie with Hungary's Jószef Ángyán and Germany's Michael Jakosits for twelfth in the qualifying round of the 10 m running target, an enormous upgrade from his 1996 Olympic feat by a fifteen-point margin.

The post-Sydney Olympics period signified a genuine test on Saathoff's marksmanship towards his goal of being one of the world's top running target shooters. In 2002, Saathoff claimed two bronze medals each in the 30+30 and mixed runs at the World Championships in Lahti, Finland. Nevertheless, Saathoff's top three finish had secured an Olympic berth for Team USA on his third upcoming Games, and thereby culminated in a selection as the Male Running Target Shooter of the Year by USA Shooting at the end of the season.

At the 2004 Summer Olympics in Athens, Saathoff qualified for his third and final U.S. Olympic team, as a 29-year-old, in the men's 10 m running target, after taking one of the top two berths to join with fellow shooter Koby Holland at the national trials. Upon entering the Games as an Olympic medal prospect, Saathoff got off to a brilliant start at 294 points to tie for second with Jakosits in the slow-target portion. He scored a modest 281 in the fast-moving round, but fell haphazardly to eighth with a total score of 575, just four points away from the final cutoff.

With the running target being removed from the Games in an effort to streamline the Olympic program, Saathoff decided to retire from competitive shooting career to focus on his current stint as an EMT at the Sierra Vista Fire Department. Indeed, he has been one of the responders to the Monument Fire that severely hit thousands of homes across Sierra Vista and Hereford in July 2011.

== Olympic results ==
Event	1996	2000	2004
10 metre running target	20th 555	12th 570	8th 575
