= Shooting at the 2000 Summer Olympics – Men's 10 metre running target =

Sports shooting at the Olympics

Men's 10 metre running target at the Games of the XXVII Olympiad
- Venue: Sydney International Shooting Centre
- Date: 21 September 2000 (slow); 22 September 2000 (fast)
- Competitors: 18 from 12 nations
- Winning score: 681.1

Medalists
1st place, gold medalist(s)		Yang Ling	China
2nd place, silver medalist(s)		Oleg Moldovan	Moldova
3rd place, bronze medalist(s)		Niu Zhiyuan	China

The men's skeet shooting competition at the 2000 Summer Olympics was the last shooting event of the Sydney Games, held on 22 and 23 September. Yang Ling successfully defended his title, a tenth of a point ahead of Oleg Moldovan.

== Records ==
The existing world and Olympic records were as follows.

Qualification records
World record	Manfred Kurzer (GER)	587	Zürich, Switzerland	16 October 1998
Olympic record	Yang Ling (CHN)	585	Atlanta, United States	26 July 1996

Final records
World record	Yang Ling (CHN)	687.9	Milan, Italy	6 June 1996
Olympic record	Yang Ling (CHN)	686.8 (585+101.8)	Atlanta, United States	26 July 1996

== Qualification round ==
The slow runs were fired on Thursday and the fast runs on Friday.

Rank	Athlete	Country	Slow	Fast	Total	Notes
1	Yang Ling	China	293	288	581	Q
2	Oleg Moldovan	Moldova	293	287	580	Q
3	Niu Zhiyuan	China	286	292	578	Q
4	Igor Kolessov	Russia	293	283	576	Q
5	Pasi Wedman	Finland	287	288	575	Q
6	Miroslav Januš	Czech Republic	293	282	575	Q
7	Manfred Kurzer	Germany	287	286	573	Q (6th: 99)
8	Dimitri Lykin	Russia	292	281	573	Q (6th: 96)
9	Andrés Felipe Torres	Colombia	292	281	573	(6th: 91)
10	Attila Solti	Guatemala	290	282	572	
11	József Sike	Hungary	290	281	571	
12	József Ángyán	Hungary	286	284	570	
12	Michael Jakosits	Germany	290	280	570	
12	Adam Saathoff	United States	289	281	570	
15	Oleksandr Zinenko	Ukraine	293	276	569	
16	David Jones	Australia	288	274	562	
17	Adam Gitsham	Australia	285	271	556	
18	Lance Dement	United States	269	272	541	

Q Qualified for final

== Final ==
Rank	Athlete	Qual	Final	Total
1st place, gold medalist(s)	Yang Ling (CHN)	581	100.1	681.1
2nd place, silver medalist(s)	Oleg Moldovan (MDA)	580	101.0	681.0
3rd place, bronze medalist(s)	Niu Zhiyuan (CHN)	578	99.4	677.4
4	Pasi Wedman (FIN)	575	97.1	672.1
5	Dimitri Lykin (RUS)	573	98.7	671.7
6	Manfred Kurzer (GER)	573	98.3	671.3
7	Igor Kolessov (RUS)	576	91.5	667.5
8	Miroslav Januš (CZE)	575	91.8	666.8

== Sources ==
- Official Report of the XXVII Olympiad — Shooting (PDF).
