= 50 meter rifle =

50 metre rifle (formerly called free rifle for men, standard rifle and sport rifle for women) is the name of two ISSF shooting events:

- 50 metre rifle three positions
- 50 metre rifle prone
