= Olympic shooting =

The term Olympic shooting can refer to any of the following:

- Shooting at the Summer Olympics, formal shooting competitions at the Summer Olympics
- The shooting events included in the Olympic program, or by extension all ISSF shooting events, even the non-Olympic ones (it is used in this meaning particularly in the United States to distinguish ISSF shooting from a large number of other shooting sports that may be more popular there)
- The Munich massacre, an attack during the 1972 Summer Olympics in Munich involving firearms

== See also ==
- Biathlon at the Winter Olympics, a winter sport that combines cross-country skiing and rifle shooting
