= Helmut Bellingrodt =

Colombian sport shooter

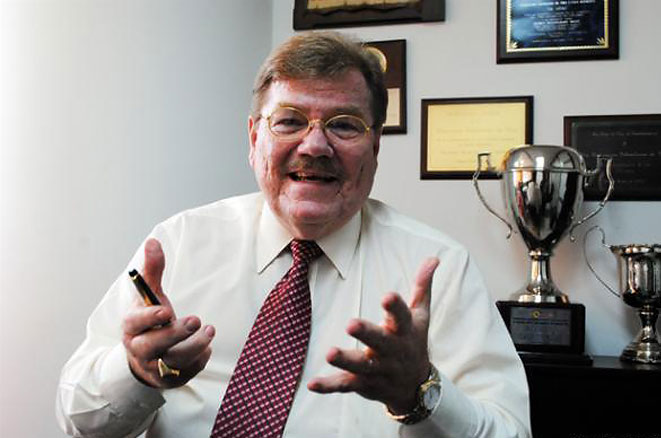

Personal information
- Full name: Helmut Bellingrodt Wolff
- Born: 10 June 1949 (age 77) Barranquilla, Colombia

Sport
- Country: Colombia
- Sport: Shooting
- Events: 50 meter running target; 50 meter running target mixed
Medal record
Representing Colombia
Men's shooting
Event	1st	2nd	3rd
Olympic Games	0	2	0
World Championships	1	1	3
World Cup	0	1	0
Pan American Games	1	1	1
Total	2	5	4
Olympic Games
Silver medal – second place	1972 Munich	50 m running target
Silver medal – second place	1984 Los Angeles	50 m running target
World Championships
Gold medal – first place	1974 Bern	50 m running target
Silver medal – second place	1975 Munich	50 m running target
Bronze medal – third place	1973 Melbourne	50 m running target
Bronze medal – third place	1973 Melbourne	50 m running target mixed
Bronze medal – third place	1978 Seoul	50 m running target team
World Cup
Silver medal – second place	1986 Mexico City	50 m running target
Pan American Games
Gold medal – first place	1983 Caracas	50 m running target
Silver medal – second place	1983 Caracas	50 m running target team
Bronze medal – third place	1991 Havana	50 m running target team

Helmut Bellingrodt (born 10 July 1949 in Barranquilla) is a Colombian Olympic sports shooter who won two Olympic silver medals. He participated in the 1972 Munich, 1976 Montreal, and 1984 Los Angeles Summer Olympic Games. He was the first Colombian athlete to win two Olympic medals, as well as the Colombian athlete with the most until Jackeline Rentería Castillo tied with a second bronze in wrestling – 55 kg at the London 2012 Summer Olympics.

His brothers Hanspeter and Horst Bellingrodt were Olympians as well.
