= Saathoff =

Saathoff is a surname. Notable people with the surname include:

- Adam Saathoff (born 1975), American sport shooter
- Johann Saathoff (born 1967), German politician
