= Attila Solti =

Hungarian sports shooter

Personal information
- Full name: Attila Solti
- Nationality: Hungary; Guatemala
- Born: 2 December 1966 (age 59) Budapest, Hungary
- Height: 1.83 m (6 ft 0 in)
- Weight: 86 kg (190 lb)

Sport
- Sport: Shooting
- Events: 10 m running target (10RT); 50 m running target (50RT)
- Club: Újpesti TE (HUN)
Medal record
Men's shooting
Representing Hungary
World Championships
Gold medal – first place	1986 Suhl	50RTMIX
Gold medal – first place	1989 Sarajevo	10RT
Representing Guatemala
Pan American Games
Gold medal – first place	1995 Mar del Plata	10RT
Gold medal – first place	1999 Winnipeg	10RT

Attila Solti (born 2 December 1966 in Budapest) is a Hungarian-Guatemalan sport shooter. Before his change of domicile to Guatemala, Solti had an extensive competitive career for his native Hungary in shooting. He won a total of twenty-nine medals in a major international competition, including two golds in both 10 and 50 m running target at World Championships and had set two world records in just a single season.

When he became a Guatemalan citizen in December 1992, Solti added two more golds to his career medal tally in the 10 m running target at the Pan American Games (1995 and 1999). Solti also competed in five editions of the Olympic Games under two different banners (Hungary in 1988 and 1992, and Guatemala in 1996 to 2004), and had been close to an Olympic medal in 1996 (finishing eighth in the running target). As the most experienced athlete of the Guatemalan team, Solti was also duly honored to carry the nation's flag twice in the opening ceremonies. Married to Guatemalan lady, he had 3 daughters.

== Career ==
Solti began shooting at the age of fifteen as a resident athlete of Újpesti Sports Academy (Hungarian: Újpesti Torna Egylet, ÚTE) in his native Budapest. Solti competed internationally for Hungary in 1986, when he set a junior world record of 588 in the 50 m running target at the European Championships, and then claimed his first ever Worlds title in Suhl, East Germany few months later. Solti made his first ever Hungarian team at the 1988 Summer Olympics in Seoul, finishing sixth in his only 50 m running target stint with a score of 588.

In 1989, Solti was able to back up his Olympic feat by smashing a new running target record at 671.6 to successfully attain his second gold medal at the World Championships in Sarajevo, Yugoslavia, erasing 7.3 points off his standard previously set at the World Cup meet in Guatemala City, Guatemala. The 1990 and 1991 season witnessed the exceptional dominance of Solti in the international shooting scene, as he continued to yield more medals to his career tally, including three golds at the World Cup series and a bronze in his pet event at the Worlds.

Solti's world record feat clearly made him one of the favorites vying for the Olympic medal in the inaugural 10 m running target at his succeeding Games in Barcelona 1992, but slipped out of the final to a thirteenth with 569 points.

Shortly after the Games, Solti left from his native Hungary to coach and train young shooters in Guatemala for six months. Upon extending his contract to two years, he decided to settle there and had become a naturalized citizen of Guatemala. Today, Solti resides in Guatemala City with his wife Maryla Girón, whom they got married in 1994, and their only daughter Nicole (born 1995). While staying in Guatemala, Solti works as a pilot for Cessna aviation force, a childhood dream that he has finally fulfilled for years.

Solti's dual citizenship permitted him to compete for Guatemala on his first Pan American Games at Mar del Plata, Argentina in 1995. There, he broke a ratified Games record of 676.8 for the running target to snatch the nation's first ever shooting gold medal, maintaining a tremendous lead over the rest of the Latin American shooters. Solti's early successes on his new team had continued at the 1996 Summer Olympics in Atlanta, where he reached the Olympic final for the first time, rounding out the eight-man running target field to eighth at 667.0. Furthermore, Solti had a golden opportunity to carry the Guatemalan flag in the opening ceremonies as the oldest and most experienced competitor of the team.

At the 1999 Pan American Games in Winnipeg, Manitoba, Canada, Solti shot brilliantly a 674.6 to defend his title in the 10 m running target, holding off a charge from U.S. marksman Armando Ayala with a sterling 2.4-point lead. Coming to Sydney 2000 as one of the favorites in the 10 m running target, Solti was expected to win Guatemala's first ever Olympic medal based on his outstanding achievements, but fell out of contention to a shameful tenth with a score of 572, just a single point away from the final cutoff. Shortly after his fourth Games, Solti sought a mighty redemption towards the end of the 2000 season, as he fired a blazing 679.3 to take the bronze at the World Cup final, trailing Germany's world record holder Manfred Kurzer and China's Olympic bronze medalist Niu Zhiyuan by a few points.

Solti campaigned for a third straight victory in his pet event at the 2003 Pan American Games in Santo Domingo, Dominican Republic, but ruled out of the podium to a credible fourth with a score of 663.9. Although he failed to medal at his third Pan American Games stint and attain an Olympic quota place in most of the events, Solti was gradually invited by ISSF and the IOC to take part on his fourth and last Olympics in Athens 2004. In the men's 10 m running target, Solti marked a modest 284 on the slow and 289 on the fast run to finish in tenth position with a total score of 573 points, repeating his feat from the previous Games.

With the running target being officially removed from the Games in an effort to streamline the program, Solti decided to retire from competitive shooting career to focus on his personal life in Guatemala and profession as an aviator.

== Olympic results ==
Event	1988	1992	1996	2000	2004
50 metre running target	6th 588	Not held			
10 metre running target	Not held	13th 569	8th 570+97.0	10th 572	10th 573
