= International Shooting Sport Federation =

International shooting sports governing body

- Sport: Shooting sports
- Jurisdiction: International
- Membership: 150 regions
- Abbreviation: ISSF
- Founded: 17 July 1907; 119 years ago
- Headquarters: Munich, Germany
- President: Luciano Rossi
- Vice president(s): Catherine Fettell; John Hansen; Kim Rhode; Yifu Wang
- Secretary: Alessandro Nicotra di San Giacomo

Official website
- www.issf-sports.org

The International Shooting Sport Federation (ISSF) is the governing body of Olympic shooting events. It also regulates several non-Olympic shooting sport events. The Federation's activities include regulation of the sport, managing Olympic qualification events and quota places, and organisation of tournaments like the World Cup and World Championships.

The ISSF was founded in 17 July 1907 and affiliates more than 150 National Shooting Federations. The ISSF headquarters is in Munich, Germany. Since 2022, the ISSF Presidency has been held by Luciano Rossi, a former Italian Senator and head of the Italian Clay Pigeon Federation (FITAV).

After the 2022 Russian invasion of Ukraine, the ISSF banned Russian and Belarusian athletes and officials from its competitions. This was relaxed to allow Individual Neutral Athletes to compete at the 2024 Summer Olympics.

== Tournaments ==
The ISSF recognizes the following competitions as ISSF Championships:

- The Olympic Games every four years (Olympic events only).
- The ISSF World Shooting Championships every four years, plus every other year for shotgun events.
- The ISSF World Cup four times a year plus a final (Olympic events only).
- The ISSF Junior World Cup four times a year plus a final (Olympic events only).
- Regional championships, such as the European Championships or the Pan-American Games, with regularity that is decided on the regional level.

These are the only competitions that have direct supervision from ISSF committees, and the only competitions where world records can be set. This leads to many national records in fact being higher than the world records.

Number	Events	First	Last
1	World Championships	1897	2023
2	World Cup	1986	2024
3	Junior World Championships	2017	2021
4	Junior World Cup	2016	2022
5	World University Championships	2003	2018
6	World Military Championships	1957	2017

== Disciplines ==
The ISSF currently sanctions five groups of shooting sport disciplines: Pistol, Rifle, Shotgun, Running Target and Target Sprint. Running Target and Target Sprint both utilise rifles, but are contested separately from the conventional Rifle events as Running Target uses moving targets, and Target Sprint uses hit/miss scoring in a biathlon-like event. Many ranges equipped for conventional rifle and pistol events are not equipped for Running Target or Target Sprint.

The overview of disciplines includes only the distinct discipline itself. Some may have both men's and women's events, just one or the other, or else have variations including team shoots. These are not listed separately.

=== Pistol ===
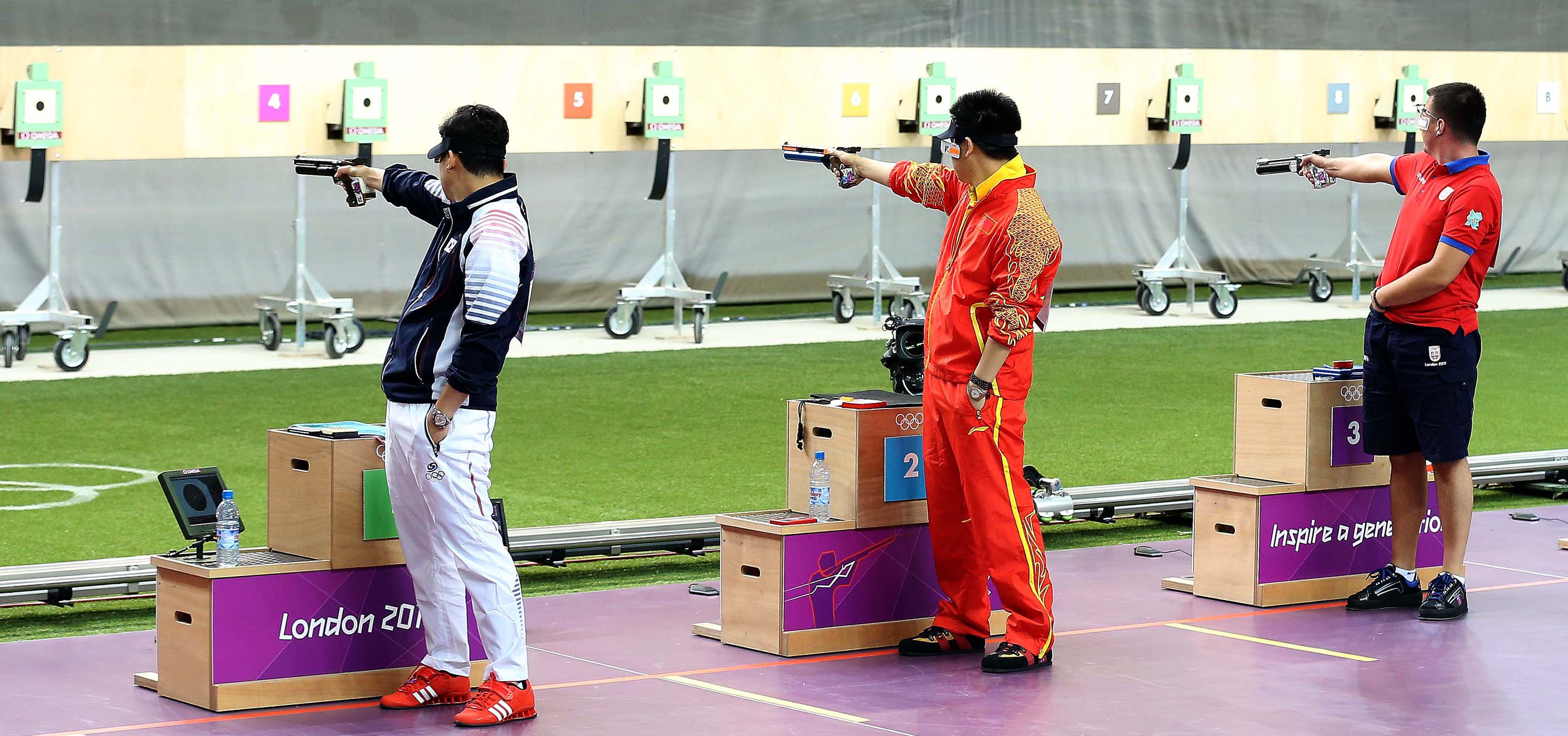
10 Metre Air Pistol

ISSF Pistol events use a mix of cartridge and air pistols. Targets are static black circles, with scoring based on scoring rings. Timed events originally used turning frames to show or hide targets. However these now use static targets with red and green lights to indicate when shots may be fired. As most high level events now use electronic target systems, the target system will ignore or penalise shots fired early or late. This reduces the incidence of mechanical faults with the frame mechanism, which could require reshoots and affect the competition programme.

==== Olympic Events ====
- 10M Air Pistol - Slow-fire precision event using a .177 calibre air pistol
- 25M Pistol - Timed shooting at a single target using a .22lr pistol (Women only)
- 25M Rapid Fire Pistol - Timed shooting at five targets using a .22lr pistol (Men only)

==== Non-Olympic Events ====
- 25M Center-fire pistol
- 25M Standard Pistol
- 50M Pistol - Slow-fire precision shooting at a single target using a .22lr pistol

=== Rifle ===
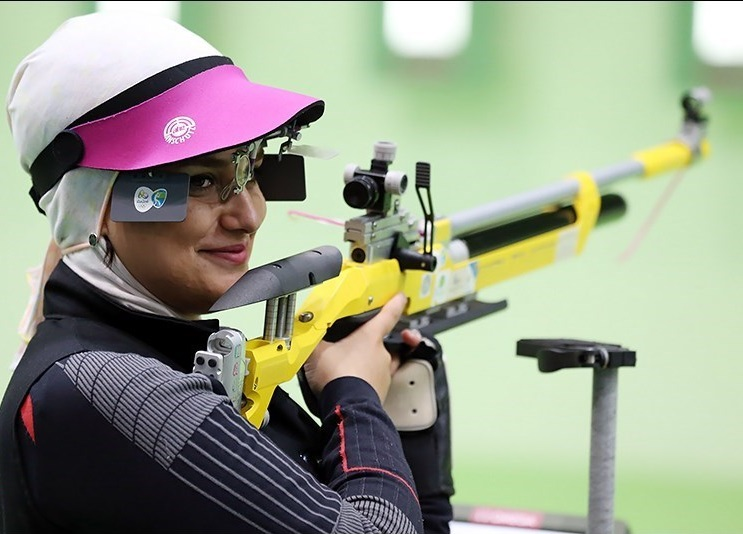
10 Metre Air Rifle

ISSF Rifle events use a mix of cartridge and air rifles. Targets are static black circles, with scoring based on scoring rings.

==== Olympic Events ====
- 10M Air Rifle - Slow-fire precision event using a .177 calibre air rifle
- 50M Three-Position Rifle - Slow-fire precision event using a .22lr single-shot rifle with Kneeling, Prone and Standing phases

==== Non-Olympic Events ====
- 50M Prone Rifle - Slow-fire precision event using a .22lr single-shot rifle
- 300M Prone Rifle - Slow-fire precision event using a single-shot centre-fire rifle
- 300M Three-Position Rifle - Slow-fire precision event using a single-shot centre-fire rifle with Kneeling, Prone and Standing phases

=== Shotgun ===
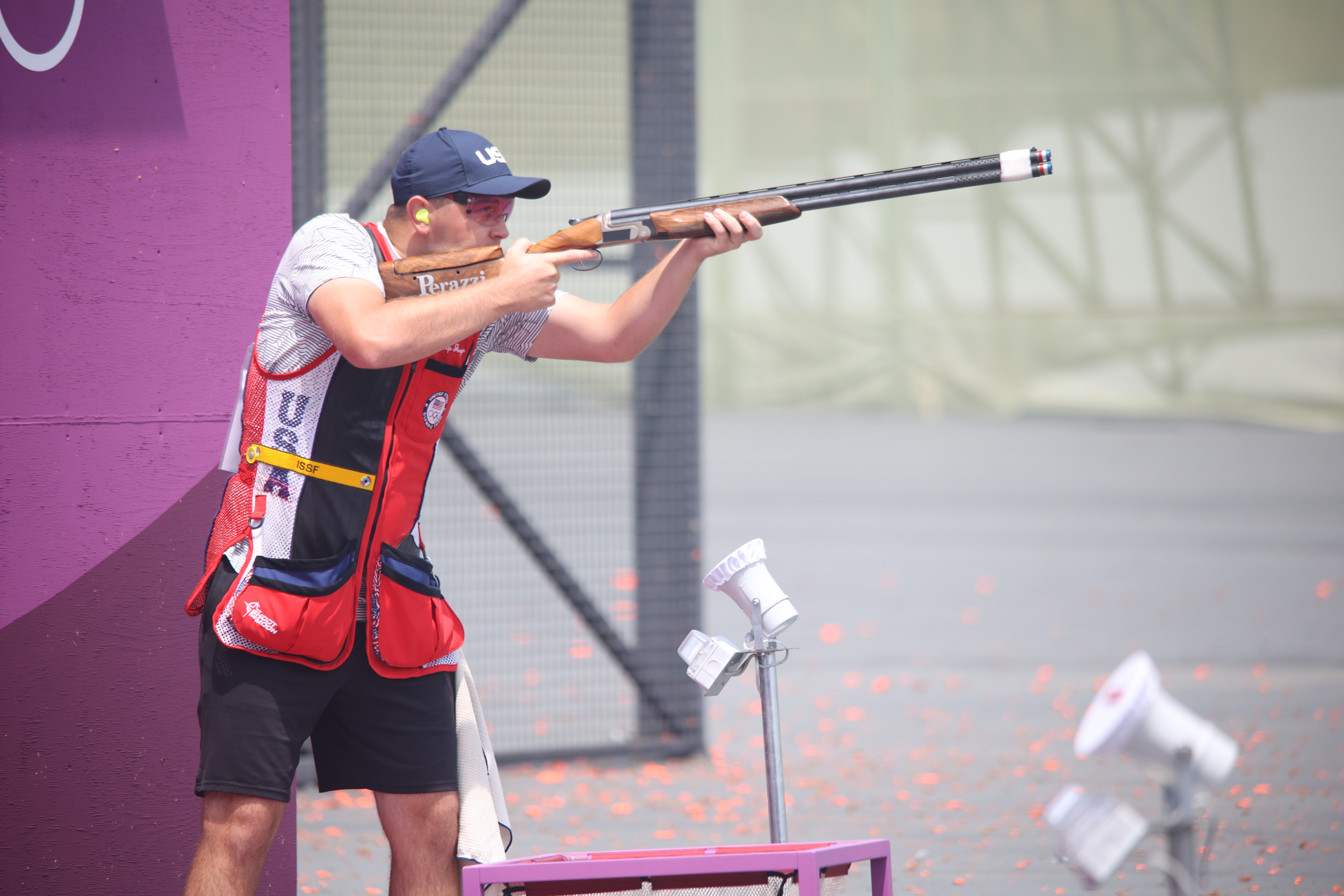
Skeet at the 2020 Olympic Games

==== Olympic Events ====
- Skeet
- Trap

==== Non-Olympic Events ====
- Double trap

=== Running Target ===
ISSF Running Target events uses a mix of cartridge and air rifles. Targets are moving black circles, with scoring based on scoring rings. No Running Target events are contested at the Olympic Games.

- 10M Running Target - uses a single-shot 0.177 calibre air rifle
- 50M Running Target - uses a single-shot 0.22lr rifle

=== Target Sprint ===
Target Sprint uses 0.177 air rifles. Targets are static black circles, with scoring based on hits/misses. Similar to Biathlon, Target Sprint involves running phases, interspersed with shooting. Unlike Biathlon, all shooting is done standing with no prone shoots. Additionally, rifles are not carried by the athlete whilst running and are left in a rack on the firing point. No Target Sprint events are contested at the Olympic Games.

== History ==
=== Development of shooting sports ===
Target shooting sports developed rapidly through the second half of the 19th century as a side effect of national security concerns. The National Rifle Association was founded in London in 1859 with the aim of raising funds for a shooting competition (the Imperial Meeting) to promote marksmanship amongst the Volunteer movement. Similar organisations and events such as Frivilliga Skytterörelsen developed across the world, particularly in Europe and European colonies. By 1900, target shooting was well established as a popular recreational sport. Disciplines varied from one nation to another, often relevant to the service rifles in domestic use. For instance, fullbore target rifle was common across the British Empire.

=== First Olympiad and early 20th century ===
Shooting was included in the first modern Olympic Games. Held in Athens in 1896, 39 shooters from seven nations competed in three pistol and two rifle events; they grew to 139 shooters from 13 nations in the following edition of the Games, held in Paris in 1900.

On 17 July 1907, representatives of seven national shooting federations, Argentina, Austria, Belgium, France, Greece, Italy, and the Netherlands met in Zurich, Switzerland, to formally establish L'Union Internationale des Fédérations et Associations nationals de Tir (International Union of National Shooting Federations and Associations in English). That meeting is recognised as the first ISSF General Assembly. Daniel Mérillon, a French lawyer from Paris, was elected as the first ISSF President.

Following the desire of the first ISSF leaders to make their organisation a world sport institution, more national federations joined L'Unione Internationale in the ensuing years: in 1912, 284 shooters coming from 16 different countries participated in the Games of the V Olympiad. In 1916, World War I caused the cancellation of the Olympic Games and every international shooting event, and under the influence of President Mérillon, the union was dissolved.

In 1920 Mérillon invited representatives of the previous members and from the countries established after the war to meet in Paris on 16 April 1920, with the intent to renew ISSF activities. Delegates from 14 countries attended and agreed to re-establish the ISSF under the name L'Union Internationale de Tir (abbreviated as UIT, in English translated as International Shooting Union), and Mérillon was re-elected President of the Union. The current name was adopted in 1998.

In the first Olympic Games after the hiatus, held in Antwerp in the same year, 233 athletes from 18 nations participated in 21 shooting events. The following year, 1921, the International Olympic Committee, declared that the ISSF regulations were to govern the shooting events in the next Olympic Games: this was the first concrete step in forging a union between the ISSF and the IOC, a step that was to have such a profound impact on the Federation's future.

A crisis between the ISSF and the IOC happened between years 1926 and 1928: the practice of awarding money prizes in ISSF Championships clashed with the rigid amateur standards of the IOC, causing the Committee to exclude shooting from the 1928 Games in Amsterdam. After a formal appeal, in 1932 shooting was re-included in the Olympic program, but the number of events was widely reduced and many of the world's best marksmen were missing because they were labeled incompatible with the IOC amateur standards. A small sample of shooting events was present in the 1936 Berlin Olympic program, while the following year Catherine Woodring became the first woman to compete in a UIT World Championship event.

1940 marked another break in the history of Olympic Games and shooting due to World War 2. The federal books, with records and archives were transported from Paris to Stockholm - Sweden being a neutral country. After the conclusion of the conflict, in 1947, eight members agreed on holding a World Championship and a General Assembly in Stockholm, where Erik Carlsson was elected as the third president of the ISSF history.

=== Late 20th century ===
The Pan-American Games and the Asian Games were both created, on their respective continents, as multi-sport international competitions, in 1951, and shooting was accepted in both. Since that year, Pan-Am Games and Asian Games have been staged every four years, with shooting always present in the program. Since 1954, the ISSF started adopting a four-year cycle for its World Championship. In 1966 the UIT decided to recognize its events as mixed ones, allowing women to compete alongside men in every official competition, including the 1968 Olympic Games and their three following editions.

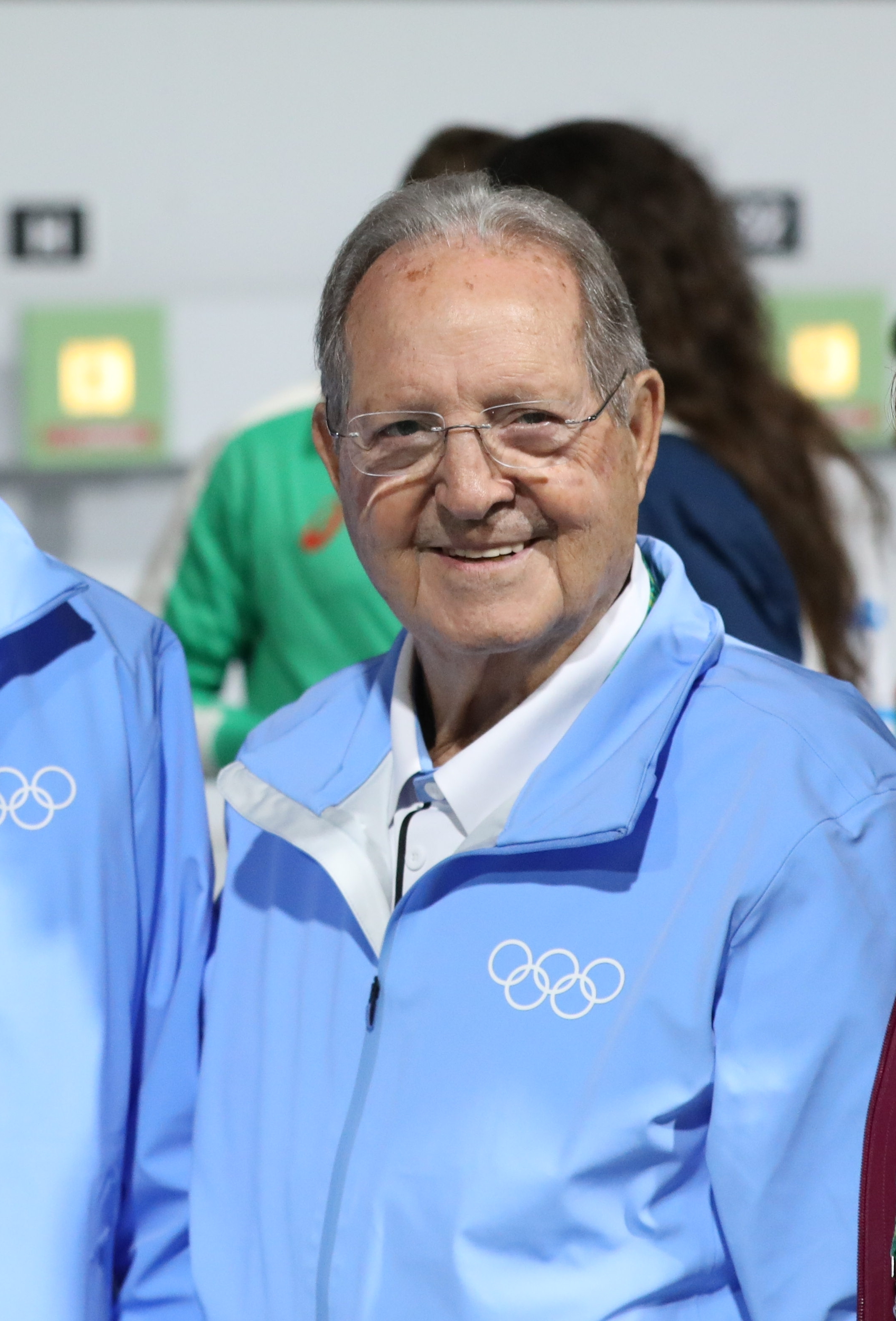
Olegario Vázquez Raña at the 2018 Summer Youth Olympics

In 1976 Hasler, after serving the ISSF for sixteen years, stepped down from the presidency, opening the way for his First Vice President George Vichos, whose administration lasted four years: during the ISSF General Assembly of the XXII Olympiad, held in Mexico City, Olegario Vázquez Raña emerged as the leading candidate for the presidency. The Mexican, an active shooter with four Olympic Games and five World Championship participations, was elected in February 1980, with 125 out of 132 votes in his favor. The 1980 General Assembly also elected Horst G. Schreiber, a prominent attorney in Munich, Germany, as the new Secretary General.

The constant growth of the member federations to over 100 changed the needs of the ISSF, leading the new leadership to the promotion of a new ISSF Constitution, drafted and approved in an Extraordinary General Assembly happened in Moscow in 1980. The new Constitution transferred the technical rule making authority to the Administrative Council, increased the authority of the ISSF Section Committees and strengthened the Federation's financial accountability. It also established the ISSF Women's Committee, that replaced the provisional 1977's Ladies Committee.

In 1984 Unni Nicolaysen became the first woman in the 77-year-old history of the Federation to be elected as a member of the Administrative Council. That same year, the IOC added three women's events to the Olympic shooting program.

Two years later, at the suggestion of the IOC, the ISSF developed an Olympic qualification system, establishing a new series of World Cups, including them in the system and recognizing their scores as potential World Records. The first ISSF Rifle and Pistol World Cup was held in Mexico City in March 1986, followed by the first ISSF Shotgun World Cup, held in Montecatini, Italy, in April. Since 1986, ISSF World Cup has been played on a yearly basis, always leading to an ISSF World Cup Final where shooters with the best scores were invited to compete in an elite competition at the end of each season. 25 junior events were added to the Championship programs in 1994.

During the General Assembly held in Barcelona in 1998, the word sport was formally incorporated into the Federation's name, changing it into the current International Shooting Sport Federation. Between 1996 and 2000 Olympic Games, three women's events were added to the program.

=== 21st century ===
At the 2004 Olympic Games in Athens, 390 shooters, representing 106 countries, competed in 17 events. After that two categories were removed from the program, reducing it to 15 events. Another record setting participation was recorded in 2006 in Zagreb for the ISSF World Championship in all events: 1,932 senior and junior athletes represented 97 nations, and competed in 54 individual events and 51 team events. Also in 2006, Olegario Vázquez Raña and Horst Schreiber were voted and re-elected respectively as President and Secretary General of the ISSF.

On July 17, 2007, the International Shooting Sport Federation celebrated the 100th anniversary of the initial meeting in Zurich. Currently counting 158 members from 146 countries, the Federation started as the governing body of two shooting events, growing to 15 Olympic and 23 World Championship ones, and becoming an Olympic organ.

In 2008, in Beijing, 390 athletes from 103 countries competed in 15 events for three disciplines: Pistol, Rifle and Shotgun. Following what the IOC President Jacques Rogge called "a tradition", the first gold medal of the Games of the XXIX Olympiad was awarded on August 9 to Kateřina Emmons, a Czech shooter competing in the 10 m Air Rifle Women event.

In 2017, the ISSF made the unusual move to refer Vice-President Luciano Rossi (also head of the Italian Clay Pigeon Federation (FITAV)) to the Ethics Committee, accusing him of conflicts of interest and disloyalty. Rossi had criticised the changes to the Olympic Shooting Programme, which included dropping the Prone Rifle, 50 meter Pistol and Double Trap shotgun events. The ISSF alleged that Rossi had an undisclosed business interest in a manufacturer of traps, which motivated his lobbying in favour of the Double Trap event. Rossi was also accused of spreading misinformation and disloyalty when he claimed that ISSF Secretary General Franz Schreiber and Vice President Gary Anderson had discussed the use of laser guns with the IOC "as possible future of the shooting sports", which the ISSF vehemently denied. In May 2018, the Ethics Committee found that the allegations were "predominantly justified" and banned Rossi from any shooting-related activities for three years. A number of athletes wore black armbands at the following World Cup match in support of Rossi. Rossi appealed to the Court of Arbitration for Sport who reduced the three-year suspension to just 20 weeks, whilst increasing his fine from CHF30,000 to CHF50,000. In the full ruling, the Court considered the three-year ban to have been "clearly disproportionate" and found personal and political motivations within the ISSF had been a factor in his suspension, which would have excluded him from running for the ISSF Presidency at the end of 2018.

In 2018, Olegario Vázquez Raña stepped down after 38 years as president of the federation. At the 68th ISSF General Assembly, Russian oligarch Vladimir Lisin was elected over Italian Luciano Rossi by 148 votes to 144. Lisin is a Russian steel tycoon and former President of the European Shooting Confederation. The election followed a contentious campaign. Having served out his ethics suspension, Rossi claimed to have received death threats aimed at forcing him out of the election. He received an escort from Munich police at the Assembly. Lisin had been President of the European Shooting Confederation and the Russian Shooting Union. Alexander Ratner was elected as ISSF Secretary-General, taking over from Franz Schreiber. Ratner had served on the 1980 Moscow Olympic Games Organising Committee, but had since become a naturalised German citizen. He was later elected President of the European Confederation, succeeding Lisin.

In September 2019, Rossi challenged the election result alleging irregularities that prevented two federations from voting - which he claimed would have led to a tie. In December 2019, Rossi withdrew his case and was ordered to pay arbitration costs.

==== Lisin Presidency ====
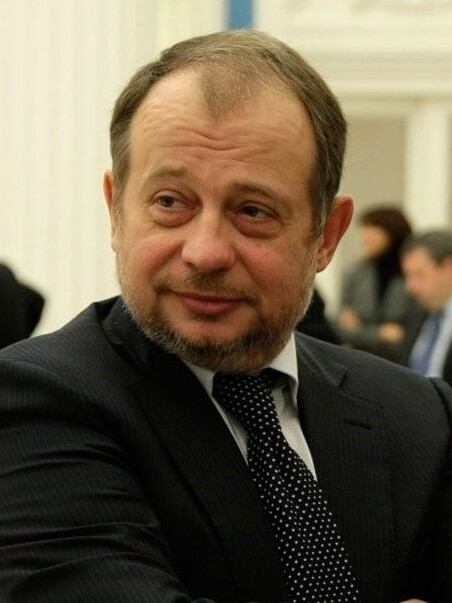
Vladimir Lisin, ISSF President 2018-22

Taking office in November 2018, Lisin immediately announced the formation of a USD10M Development Fund for the 2019-2022 quadrennium, seeded from his personal wealth. The fund targeted three groups - Member Federations that needed assistance in developing shooting sports in their countries; Member Federations that had won quota places to the 2020 Olympic Games; and individual athletes who led the ISSF rankings at the end of each year. In June 2022, the ISSF claimed that more than $3.5m had been distributed by the fund, with an additional $1.1m worth of equipment for sport development receiving by 43 national federations.

In October 2019, the ISSF was issued a warning by the IOC after it was found to have been selling hospitality packages for the 2020 Olympic Games in Tokyo, which included the reselling of accreditations and event tickets - contrary to the Fundamental Rules for ticket sales by International Federations.

In December 2019, an EGM was convened to update the Federation constitution. A previous attempt by Vladimir Lisin to change the constitution in 2016 had failed. The key amendments included term limits for all posts (including the President), along with the abolition of proxy voting - a disqualified proxy vote had been a key point of the appeal by presidential candidate Luciano Rossi to overturn the presidential elections. The amendments also abolished elections for the Secretary-General, with the role becoming an appointment by the President. Rossi campaigned against this perceived centralisation of power to the Presidency. The constitution was approved at the EGM, although a clause to restrict membership to one federation per nation was removed - 13 nations have dual membership.

In November 2022, the Nordic Shooting Region issued an open letter to all ISSF member federations expressing deep concern regarding the development of the sport and calling for stability in the rule book and competition programme. This followed organisational difficulties at the 2022 Rifle & Pistol World Championships in Cairo, backdropped by a recent history of fluid rules. The ISSF Technical Rules are typically updated once every 4 years in the January following an Olympic Games. However, since the publication of the 2017 rules (following the 2016 Olympic Games), the format of multiple events had been changed and updated, sometimes just weeks before major matches. This was exacerbated by one of the constitutional amendments, which permitted the Executive Committee to enact rule changes - a role previously reserved for the larger Administrative Committee. This increased the personal influence of the President on the rule book. In 2018 the Women's Three Position Rifle format was changed mid-cycle to a 3x40 format, matching the Men's event. In July 2021 the format was changed back to 3x20 for both Men and Women. Matters came to a head in May 2022 when Lisin unilaterally announced rule changes for the shotgun disciplines prior to the Baku World Cup. This reportedly occurred without consultation, following an incident at the previous World Cup in Lonato where Lisin had interrupted the semi-final of the Trap competition, asking the competition jury to deviate from the prescribed format. The jury had declined, sticking to the published rule book. Lisin allegedly replied "Then I change the rules".

In the November 2022 edition of Deutsche SchützenZeitung (the monthly magazine of Deutscher Schützenbund), Chief Editor Harald Strier also decried the "chaos" of the Cairo World Championships, claiming that the schedules had constantly changed and that rules used in such cases as tie breaks had not been clarified. He went on to claim that (unspecified) threats had been made by ISSF leadership, and criticised the selection of an expensive holiday resort (Sharm El Sheikh) as the destination for the 70th General Assembly.

These organisational controversies ran concurrent with the 2022 Russian invasion of Ukraine, as a result of which the ISSF had banned Russian and Belarusian athletes and officials from its competitions. In March, both Alexander Ratner and Vladimir Lisin had been barred from attending the 10m European Shooting Championships in any official capacity, amid calls for them to step aside. Ratner attended privately, insisting that neither he nor Lisin had links with the Russian government. In April, Australia added Lisin to its list of sanctioned individuals. In October 2022, the US was urged to sanction Lisin, amid claims that his steel firm had supplied materials to companies connected with Russian nuclear weapon development. In March 2023, the new president Luciano Rossi of Italy expressed his desire to reinstate Russian and Belarusian athletes so they can compete at the 2024 Summer Olympics in Paris.

In November, Oleg Volkov (president of the Ukrainian Shooting Federation) called on IOC President Thomas Bach to prevent Lisin from standing for re-election as ISSF President at the 70th General Assembly on November 30.

At the 70th General Assembly, Rossi again stood in the presidential elections, calling 2022 a "Time for Change". Alexander Ratner - the ISSF Secretary-General - published an open letter in defence of Lisin, which included stinging personal criticism of Rossi. On 30 November, Rossi won the presidential election 136 votes to 127.

In December 2022 it emerged that Lisin had reneged on a promise to provide €792,000 in prize money for the ISSF President's Cup. Prize money was eventually paid in April 2023. It was also claimed that the new management team were struggled to gain control of the Federation's social media accounts following the election.

===== Shooting at the Commonwealth Games =====
In January 2018, the Commonwealth Games Federation confirmed that shooting had been dropped from the programme of the 2022 Commonwealth Games. Shooting had been included at every Commonwealth Games since Christchurch 1974. In December 2018 a delegation from British Shooting and the ISSF - including Vladimir Lisin - visited Birmingham and discussed the inclusion of shooting with the Birmingham organising committee. In June 2019 organisers announced that the proposal made had been unsuccessful. Shooting at the Commonwealth Games has not historically been supervised by the ISSF, and includes disciplines such as Fullbore target rifle which are not governed by the ISSF. The new President however considered it important to ensure the continued participation of shooting in one of the largest multi-sport Games. Shooters were surprised to learn that the ISSF's unsuccessful bid had scrapped the usual Commonwealth shooting programme in favour of bidding the Olympic programme, plus Fullbore rifle.

In July 2022, the organising committee for the 2026 Commonwealth Games released their initial programme, which also did not include shooting. In August 2022, Shooting Australia announced that the ISSF had submitted an Expression of Interest for shooting as an additional sport. Like the proposals for the 2022 Games, the proposed programme was significantly restricted, including just four disciplines - Trap, Air Rifle, Air Pistol and Fullbore Rifle. This dropped cartridge pistol, 50m rifle, skeet and double trap. In October 2022, the inclusion of Shooting was confirmed but without Fullbore Rifle.

==== Rossi Presidency ====
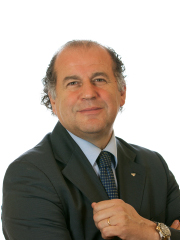
Luciano Rossi, ISSF President 2022-

Luciano Rossi was elected as ISSF President at the 70th General Assembly on 30 November 2022.

On December 1, Rossi appointed German Willi Grill as Secretary-General, replacing Ratner.

In March 2023, Rossi expressed his desire to reinstate Russian and Belarusian athletes so they could compete as Individual Neutral Athletes at the 2024 Summer Olympics in Paris. Two Belarusian athletes ultimately competed as neutral athletes, neither advancing to finals.

In December 2023, the Executive Committee convened an Extraordinary Meeting at the request of Rossi, where Willi Grill was dismissed as Secretary General, the reasons for which were not disclosed.

== See also ==
- List of shooting sports organisations
- ISSF World Shooting Championships
- Shooting at the Summer Olympics
