= Andrey Vasiliev =

Belarusian sports shooter

Personal information
- Full name: Andrey Nikolayevich Vasiliev
- Nationality: Belarus
- Born: 13 January 1967 (age 59) Dushanbe, Tajik SSR, Soviet Union
- Height: 1.80 m (5 ft 11 in)
- Weight: 80 kg (176 lb)

Sport
- Sport: Shooting
- Event(s): 10 m running target (10RT); 50 m running target (50RT)
- Club: Dynamo Brest
- Coached by: Gennadiy Sotskov
Medal record
Men's shooting
Representing Soviet Union
World Championships
Bronze medal – third place	1991 Stavanger	10RT
Representing Belarus
World Championships
Gold medal – first place	2003 Gothenburg	10RT

Andrey Nikolayevich Vasiliev (Belarusian: Андрэй Мікалаевіч Васільеў; new transliteration: Andrei Mikalaievich Vasilyeu, born January 13, 1967) is a Belarusian sport shooter. He has competed for the former Soviet Union and Belarus in running target shooting at two Olympics (1992 and 2004), and has been close to an Olympic final in 1992 (finishing in fourth place). Outside his Olympic career, Vasiliev has won a total of seven medals in a major international competition, spanning the ISSF World Cup series, the European Championships and the World Championships. Currently residing in Brest, Belarus, Vasiliev trains under his longtime coach Gennadiy Sotskov for the shooting team at Dynamo.

Vasiliev was born in Dushanbe, Tajik SSR. His Olympic debut came as part of the Unified Team at the 1992 Summer Olympics in Barcelona, representing the former Tajik SSR. There, he shot brilliantly a total of 667.0 to tie for fourth position with Hungary's Jószef Sike in the inaugural 10 m running target final, falling short of an Olympic bronze by just a four-point margin.

Twelve years after his last Olympics, Vasiliev competed for the second time in the men's 10 m running target, as a member of the Belarusian shooting team, at the 2004 Summer Olympics in Athens. He managed to get a minimum qualifying standard of 584 to join with fellow marksman Andrei Kazak and secure an Olympic berth for Belarus in his pet event, following a top finish at the European Championships a year earlier in Gothenburg, Sweden. Vasiliev marked a steady 287 in the slow-target portion and 282 in the fast-moving round to accumulate a total score of 569 points, shutting him out of the final to thirteenth in a 19-shooter field.
