= Lance Dement =

American sports shooter

Personal information
- Born: September 20, 1968 (age 57) Hawaii, United States

Sport
- Sport: Sports shooting

Lance Dement (born September 20, 1968) is an American sports shooter. He competed in the men's 10 metre running target event at the 2000 Summer Olympics.
