= Igor Kolessov =

Russian sports shooter

Igor Kolessov (born August 15, 1971 in Moscow) is a Russian sport shooter. He competed at the 2000 Summer Olympics in the men's 10 metre running target event, in which he placed seventh.
