= Jo Song-nam =

North Korean sports shooter (born 1957)

Personal information
- Native name: 조성남
- Nationality: North Korean
- Born: 30 October 1957 (age 67)

Sport
- Sport: Sports shooting

Jo Song-nam (born 30 October 1957) is a North Korean sports shooter. He competed in the mixed 50 metre running target event at the 1980 Summer Olympics.
