= Adam Gitsham =

Australian sports shooter

Personal information
- Nationality: Australian
- Born: 28 November 1978 (age 46); Cooroy, Queensland, Australia

Sport
- Sport: Sports shooting

Adam Gitsham (born 22 November 1978) is an Australian sports shooter. He competed in the men's 10 metre running target event at the 2000 Summer Olympics.
