= David Jones (sport shooter) =

Australian sports shooter

Personal information
- Nationality: Australian
- Born: 24 December 1977 (age 48) Ipswich, Queensland, Australia

Sport
- Sport: Sports shooting

David Jones (born 24 December 1977) is an Australian sports shooter. He competed in the men's 10 metre running target event at the 2000 Summer Olympics.
