= Todd Bensley =

American sports shooter (born 1960)

Personal information
- Born: September 26, 1960 (age 65) Augusta, Georgia, United States

Sport
- Sport: Sports shooting

Todd Bensley (born September 26, 1960) is an American sports shooter. He competed at the 1984 Summer Olympics and the 1988 Summer Olympics.
