= Göte Gåård =

Swedish sports shooter} (1931–2016)

Personal information
- Born: 23 November 1931 Grums, Sweden
- Died: 25 April 2016 (aged 84)

Sport
- Sport: Sports shooting

Göte Gåård (23 November 1931 – 25 April 2016) was a Swedish sports shooter. He won three gold medals at the 1970 ISSF World Shooting Championships in Phoenix, where he set a world record in 50 meter running target mixed. He competed in the 50 meter running target event at the 1972 Summer Olympics.
