= Jens Zimmermann (host) =

German sport announcer (born 1972)

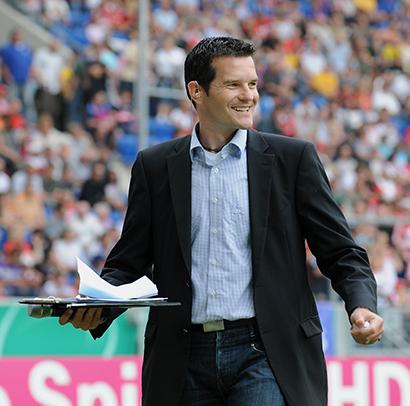
- Jens Zimmermann on duty
- Born: Jens Oliver Zimmermann; August 6, 1972; Freudenstadt, Baden-Württemberg, West Germany
- Sports commentary career
- Genres: live commentary, hosting, on-site hosting
- Sports: football, handball, gymnastics, wrestling, ski jumping, Nordic combined, biathlon, cross country
- Website: www.moderation-zimmermann.de

Jens Oliver Zimmermann (born 6 August 1972 in Freudenstadt, West Germany) is a German sport announcer, moderator and athletes manager. He started his career as a press speaker of popular German football team Stuttgarter Kickers. Nowadays he executes announcing of sport competitions in Germany as well as abroad. Jens Zimmermann is the first and only German announcer who featured at the 2010 Vancouver Olympic Games and 2014 Sochi Olympic Games.

== Life and career ==
=== Early career ===
Starting his career in 1997 as a press speaker of Stuttgarter Kickers, he developed his career to Managing Director at the same football club, a position he held from 2009 to 2011. In 2011 he ran self-founded company "Marketing-Moderation Zimmermann", where he officially started in the field of athlete management. In 2014, in the expansion of business, the new agency "24passion" was created. "24passion" executes the full-cycle Sport Production (audio-/visual support of the sport events), athlete management (Marcel Nguyen, Frank Stäbler, Anna Seidel, Johannes Rydzek, Manuel Faisst, Andreas Toba, Elisabeth Seitz, Sebastian Bradatsch, Luis Brethauer, Daniel Bohnacker, Aline Focken and the German handball players Felix Koenig and Marcel Schiller) and marketing solutions for business.

=== Overall experience ===
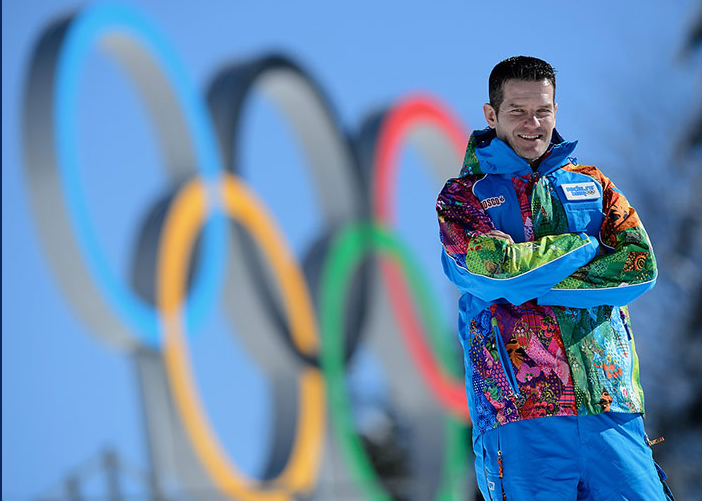
Jens Zimmermann at 2014 Winter Olympic Games.

As the announcer Jens Zimmermann has announced more than 500 events overall in the German and English languages. His professional career includes the sport world's top competitions like the Olympic Games, Four Hills Tournament in Oberstdorf, Nordic Ski World Championships, 2007 World Men's Handball Championship, Mercedes-Benz Junior Football Cup (annually since 2001) and more than 60 handball games in the German League.
