= Seppo Saarenpää =

Finnish sports shooter

Personal information
- Born: 5 September 1937 (age 88) Helsinki, Finland

Sport
- Sport: Sports shooting

Seppo Saarenpää (born 5 September 1937) is a Finnish former sports shooter. Saarenpää competed at the 1968 Summer Olympics and the 1980 Summer Olympics.
