= Pedro Ramírez (sport shooter) =

Puerto Rican sports shooter (born 1939)

Personal information
- Born: 20 April 1939 (age 87)

Sport
- Sport: Sports shooting

Pedro Ramírez (born 20 April 1939) is a Puerto Rican former sports shooter. He competed at the 1972 Summer Olympics and the 1976 Summer Olympics.
