= Italo Mari =

Italian sports shooter

Personal information
- Nationality: Italian
- Born: 13 February 1939 (age 86); Vescovato, Italy

Sport
- Sport: Sports shooting

Italo Mari (born 13 February 1939) is an Italian sports shooter. He competed in the mixed 50 metre running target event at the 1980 Summer Olympics.
