= Bob Cheyne =

Canadian sports shooter

Personal information
- Nationality: Canadian
- Born: 14 December 1947 (age 77); Vancouver, British Columbia, Canada

Sport
- Sport: Sports shooting

Bob Cheyne (born 14 December 1947) is a Canadian sports shooter. He competed in two events at the 1984 Summer Olympics.
