= Eugeniusz Janczak =

Polish sports shooter

Personal information
- Nationality: Polish
- Born: 13 September 1955 (age 69); Wrocław, Poland

Sport
- Sport: Sports shooting

Eugeniusz Janczak (born 13 September 1955) is a Polish sports shooter. He competed in the mixed 50 metre running target event at the 1980 Summer Olympics.
