= Jean-Luc Tricoire =

French sports shooter

Personal information
- Nationality: French
- Born: 23 March 1953; Châlons-en-Champagne, France
- Died: 23 June 2010 (aged 57)

Sport
- Sport: Sports shooting

Jean-Luc Tricoire (23 March 1953 – 23 June 2010) was a French sports shooter. He competed at the 1984 Summer Olympics, the 1988 Summer Olympics and the 1992 Summer Olympics.
