= Randy Stewart =

American sports shooter (born 1951)

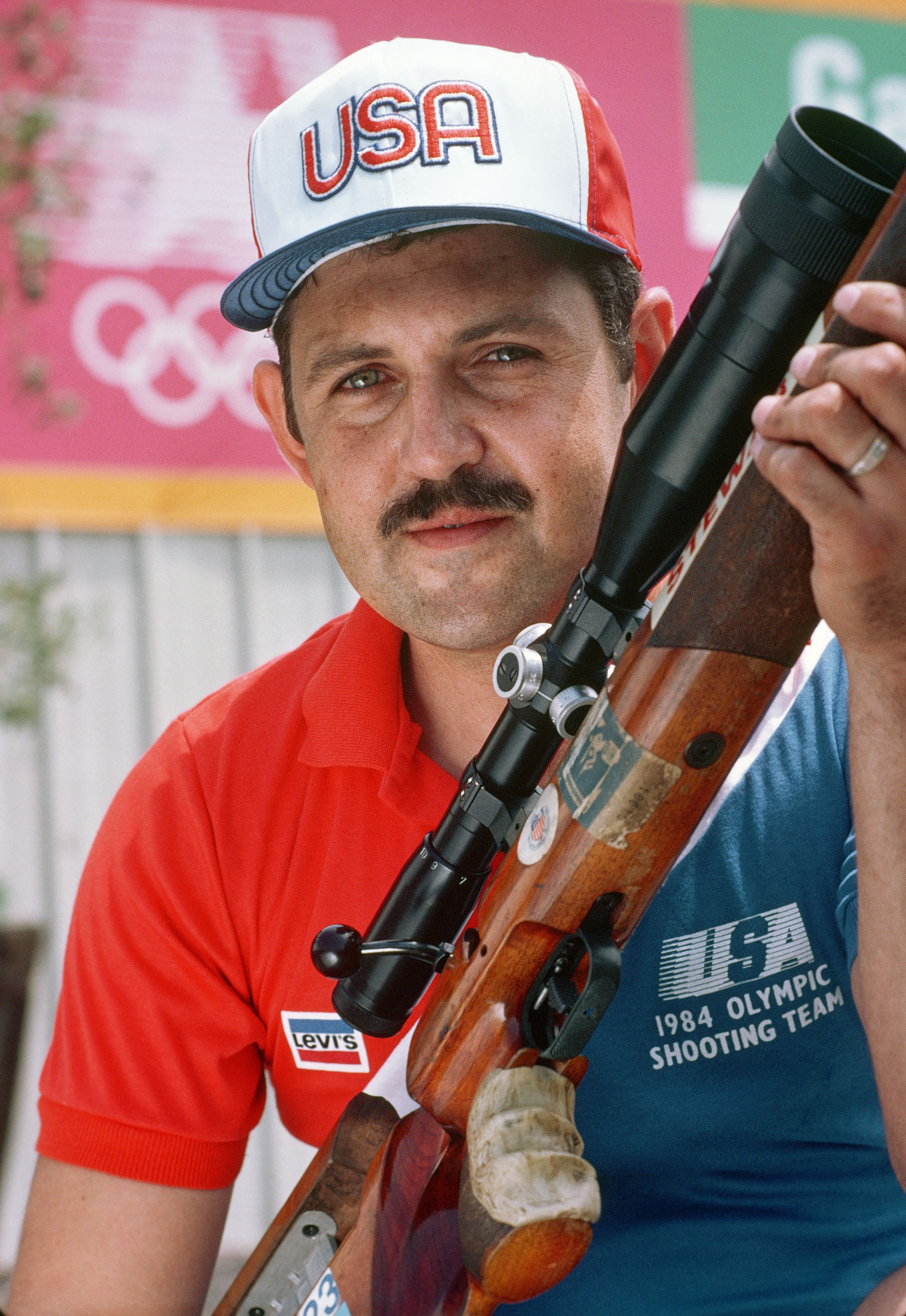
- Stewart in 1984

Personal information
- Nationality: American
- Born: October 28, 1951 (age 74) Nashville, Arkansas, United States

Sport
- Sport: Sports shooting

Randy Stewart (born October 28, 1951) is an American sports shooter. He competed in the men's 50 metre running target event at the 1984 Summer Olympics.
