= Thomas Pfeffer =

German sports shooter

Olympic medal record

Shooting

Representing East Germany
Silver medal – second place	1980 Moscow	50 m running target

Thomas Pfeffer (born 15 September 1957) is a German sport shooter. He won a silver medal in 50 m Running Target in the 1980 Moscow Olympics.
