= Aleksandr Gazov =

Soviet sport shooter (born 1946)

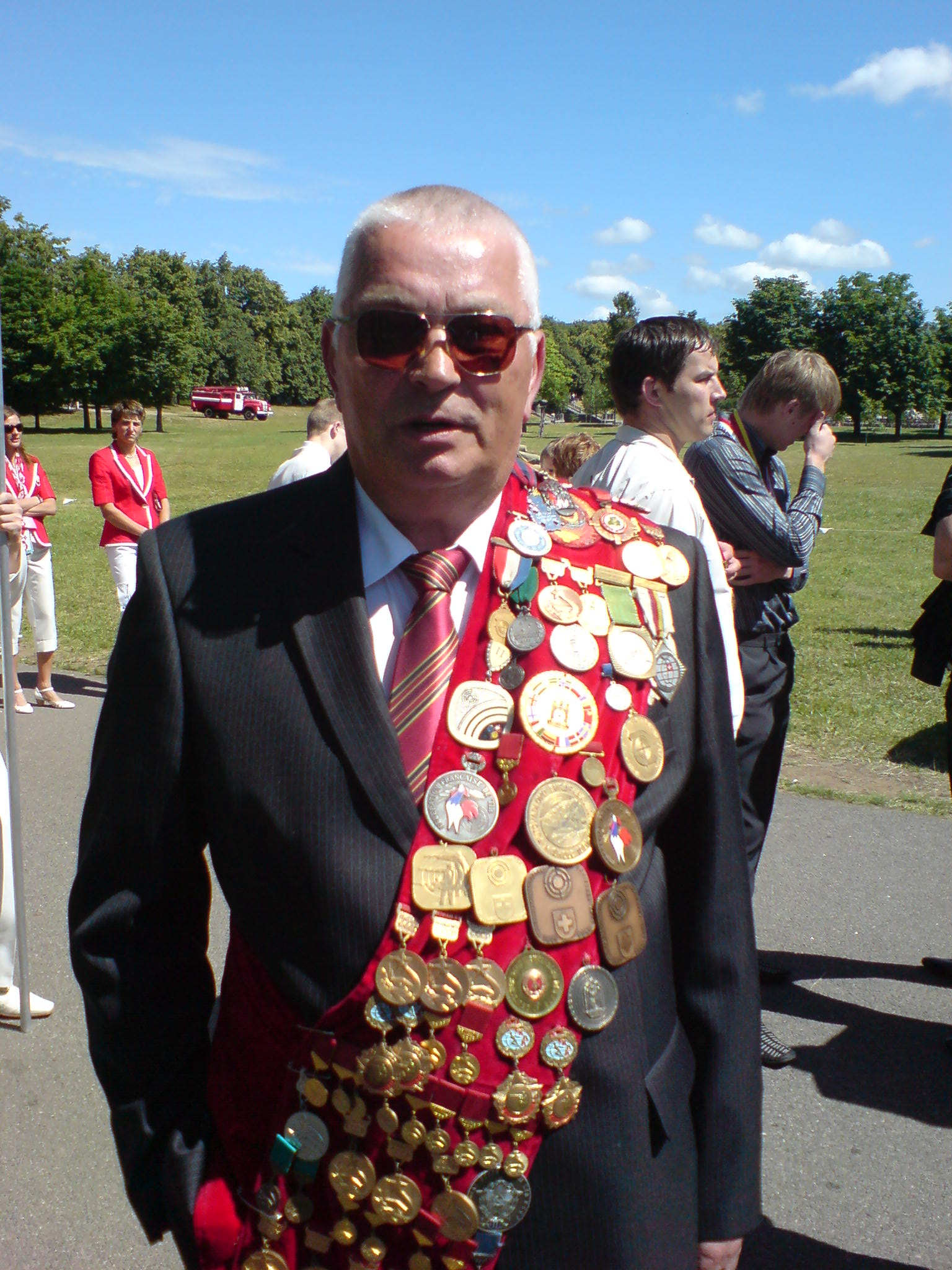
- Gazov in 2008

Medal record

Men's Shooting

Representing the Soviet Union

Olympic Games
Gold medal – first place	1976 Montreal	50 m Running Target
Bronze medal – third place	1980 Moscow	50 m Running Target

Aleksandr Gazov (Russian: Александр Васильевич Газов; born June 17, 1946) is a former Soviet sport shooter and Olympic champion.

He received a gold medal in 50 m Running Target at the 1976 Summer Olympics in Montreal.

At the 1980 Summer Olympics in Moscow he received a bronze medal.
