= Gyula Szabó (sport shooter) =

Hungarian sports shooter (1947–2018)

Personal information
- Born: 20 October 1947 Poroszló, Hungary
- Died: 13 August 2018 (aged 70)

Sport
- Sport: Sports shooting

Gyula Szabó (20 October 1947 – 13 August 2018) was a Hungarian sports shooter. He competed at the 1972 Summer Olympics and the 1976 Summer Olympics.
