= Lars Ivarsson (sport shooter) =

Swedish sports shooter

Personal information
- Nationality: Swedish
- Born: 22 May 1939 (age 85); Vretstorp, Sweden

Sport
- Sport: Sports shooting

Lars Ivarsson (born 22 May 1939) is a Swedish sports shooter. He competed in the mixed 50 metre running target event at the 1980 Summer Olympics.
