= Krister Holmberg =

Swedish chemist

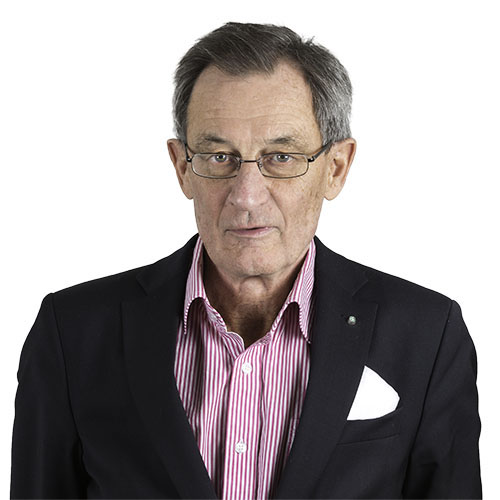
Krister Holmberg

Krister Holmberg, born 1946, is a Swedish chemist.

Holmberg took a PhD in Organic Chemistry from Chalmers University of Technology in Gothenburg, Sweden in 1974. He then worked in industry for many years and he was R&D Director of Berol Nobel in Stenungsund, Sweden. During the period 1991-1998 he was Director of the Institute for Surface Chemistry in Stockholm. Since 1998 he has been Professor of Surface Chemistry at Chalmers University of Technology. His recent research has focussed on the behavior of surface active compounds in solution and at interfaces. He has been active in a number of industrial applications of surface and colloid chemistry.

Holmberg has been visiting professor at universities in the EU, the US and China: P. et M. Curie in Paris, the University of Florence, the University of California at Santa Barbara and the Chinese Academy of Sciences in Beijing. He is a member of the Royal Swedish Academy of Engineering Sciences (Kungliga Ingenjörsvetenskapsakademien), of the Royal Swedish Academy of Sciences (Kungliga Vetenskapsakademin) and of the Royal Academy of Arts and Sciences in Gothenburg (Kungliga Vetenskaps- och Vitterhetssamhället i Göteborg). He was chairman of the latter academy during 2014.

In 2000, Holmberg was awarded the French National Order of Merit (l'Ordre National du Mérite au grade de Chevalier), and in 2006 he won the Oscar Carlson medal from the Swedish Chemical Society. He received the JCIS Life-Time Achievement Award in 2008, the Kash Mittal Award in 2018 and the Quancheng Friendship Award by the city of Jinan, China in 2019. In 2021 he received the Friendship Award of China from the Chinese Government.
