= Christoph-Michael Zeisner =

German sports shooter (1943–2022)

Personal information
- Born: 5 December 1943 Gütersloh, Germany
- Died: 12 July 2022 (aged 78) Southbroom

Sport
- Sport: Sports shooting

Christoph-Michael Zeisner (5 December 1943 – 12 July 2022) was a German sports shooter. He competed at the 1972 Summer Olympics and the 1976 Summer Olympics for West Germany.
