= Wolfgang Hamberger =

German sport shooter (born 1942)

Personal information
- Nationality: German
- Born: 29 July 1942 Giessen, Germany

Sport
- Sport: Sports shooting

Wolfgang Hamberger (born 29 July 1942) is a German sports shooter. He competed in the men's 50 metre running target event at the 1976 Summer Olympics. He won several national championships and was national coach for running targets from 1986 to 1989.
