= Edmund Moeller (sport shooter) =

American sport shooter (born 1934)

Personal information
- Born: September 10, 1934 (age 91) Moulton, Texas, U.S.

Sport
- Sport: Sports shooting

Edmund Otto Moeller Jr. (born September 10, 1934) is an American former sports shooter. He competed in the 50 metre running target event at the 1972 Summer Olympics.
