= Miroslav Januš =

Czech sport shooter (born 1972)

Personal information
- Nationality: Czech Republic
- Born: 9 August 1972 (age 54) Postupice, Czechoslovakia
- Height: 1.83 m (6 ft 0 in)
- Weight: 80 kg (176 lb)

Sport
- Sport: Shooting
- Events: 10 m running target (10RT); 50 m running target (50RT)
- Club: Dukla Plzeň
- Coached by: Ján Kermiet
Medal record
Men's shooting
Representing the Czech Republic
Event	1st	2nd	3rd
Olympic Games	0	0	1
World Championships	2	4	3
European Championships	14	9	6
Total	16	13	10
Olympic Games
Bronze medal – third place	1996 Atlanta	10RT
World Championships
Silver medal – second place	1994 Milan	10RTMIX
Silver medal – second place	2006 Zagreb	50RT
Silver medal – second place	2008 Plzeň	10RT
Silver medal – second place	2009 Vierumäki	10RTMIX
Bronze medal – third place	1994 Milan	50RTMIX
Bronze medal – third place	2006 Zagreb	10RT
Bronze medal – third place	2008 Plzeň	50RT

Miroslav Januš (born 9 August 1972) is a Czech sport shooter. A four-time Olympian (1992 to 2004), Januš is one of Czech Republic's most successful individual shooters in Olympic history, having won a bronze medal in the 10 m running target at Atlanta 1996. Outside his Olympic career, Januš has produced a career record of 120 medals in a major international competition, including fourteen golds at the European Championships, and a total of ten in different color at the Worlds since his debut came as a junior in 1989.

== Career ==
Started shooting at the age of fourteen, Januš ascended to prominence in the international scene as part of the former Czechoslovakia team in 1989. By that time, he set a junior world record of 566 in the running target to successfully claim his first ever gold medal at the World Championships in Sarajevo, Yugoslavia. Januš' early rise continued as he improved his personal best by six points for another Worlds title two years later in Stavanger, Norway. He made his first Czech team at the 1992 Summer Olympics in Barcelona, but failed to reach the final in the inaugural 10 m running target, finishing ninth with a score of 572.

In 1995, Januš reached the peak of his shooting career by breaking a new world record of 685.5 in the running target to earn a gold medal at the ISSF World Cup meet in Seoul, South Korea. Januš' exceptional dominance clearly made him one of the top favorites vying for an Olympic medal at his succeeding Games in Atlanta 1996. Indeed, he progressed to the 10 m running target final with a third seed at 580, and then shot brilliantly a 98.4 in the 10-shot round to give the Czechs an Olympic bronze for a total score of 678.4, trailing the Chinese duo of Yang Ling and Xiao Jun by just a few points.

The following season, Januš established his new personal best of 685.7 to assert himself with a blazing first-place finish at the 1997 World Cup final in Lugano, Switzerland, in addition to his third straight victory from the European Championships, erasing his own record that he previously set two years earlier in Seoul by just a slim tenth of a point margin (0.1).

Heading to his third Olympic Games in Sydney 2000 with confidence and luck, Januš was expected to be an overwhelming medal favorite for the Czechs, but in the 10 m running target, he put up a lackluster effort with a modest 91.8 on the 10-shot series, that shut him out of the podium to last in the eight-man final, accumulating a total score of 666.8. Earlier, Januš shot a slow-running 293 and a wretched 282 on the fast run to get a fifth-seeded score of 575 for the final.

The post-Sydney Olympics period sought a real test and a mighty redemption on Januš at the same shooting range two years later for the World Cup series. There, he commanded a robust two-point lead over the Russian tandem of Aleksandr Blinov and World champion Dimitri Lykin to claim the gold with 681.7, and secure an Olympic quota place for the Czech Republic towards his fourth straight Games.

Before the 2004 Summer Olympics in Athens, Januš held off a formidable challenge from Lykin to collect another gold in an Olympic test event at Markópoulo Olympic Shooting Centre, as part of the World Cup series, finishing in the lead at 685.5. Upon entering the Games as an Olympic medal favorite, Januš suddenly crashed out of the men's 10 m running target final with a disastrous feat in the qualifying round. He marked a lowly 283 on the slow-target and 281 on the fast run to finish a startling fifteenth out of 19 shooters with a total score of 564, just fourteen points away from the final cutoff.

== Olympic results ==
Event	1992	1996	2000	2004
10 metre running target	9th 572	(bronze) Bronze; 580+98.4	8th 575+91.8	15th 564
