= Jens Zimmermann (sport shooter) =

German sports shooter (born 1967)

Personal information
- Nationality: German
- Born: 5 January 1967 (age 59) Langenhagen, West Germany

Sport
- Sport: Sports shooting

Jens Zimmermann (born 5 January 1967) is a German sports shooter. He competed at the 1992 Summer Olympics and the 1996 Summer Olympics.
