= Ezio Cini =

Italian sports shooter

Personal information
- Nationality: Italian
- Born: 12 May 1945; Pisa, Italy
- Died: 1 November 2021 (aged 76)

Sport
- Sport: Sports shooting

Ezio Cini (12 May 1945 – 1 November 2021) was an Italian sports shooter. He competed in the men's 50 metre running target event at the 1984 Summer Olympics.
