= Charles Davis (sport shooter) =

American sport shooter (1927–2018)

Personal information
- Born: February 12, 1927 Hazard, Kentucky, United States
- Died: January 10, 2018 (aged 90) Columbus, Georgia, United States

Sport
- Sport: Sports shooting

Charles Davis (February 12, 1927 – January 10, 2018) was an American sports shooter. He competed in the 50 metre running target event at the 1972 Summer Olympics.
