= Frank Tossas =

Puerto Rican sports shooter

Personal information
- Born: 23 August 1934 New York, New York, United States
- Died: 4 October 2008 (aged 74) San Antonio, Texas, United States

Sport
- Sport: Sports shooting

Frank Tossas (23 August 1934 – 4 October 2008) was a Puerto Rican sports shooter. He competed in the 50 metre running target event at the 1972 Summer Olympics.
