= Zygmunt Bogdziewicz =

Polish sports shooter

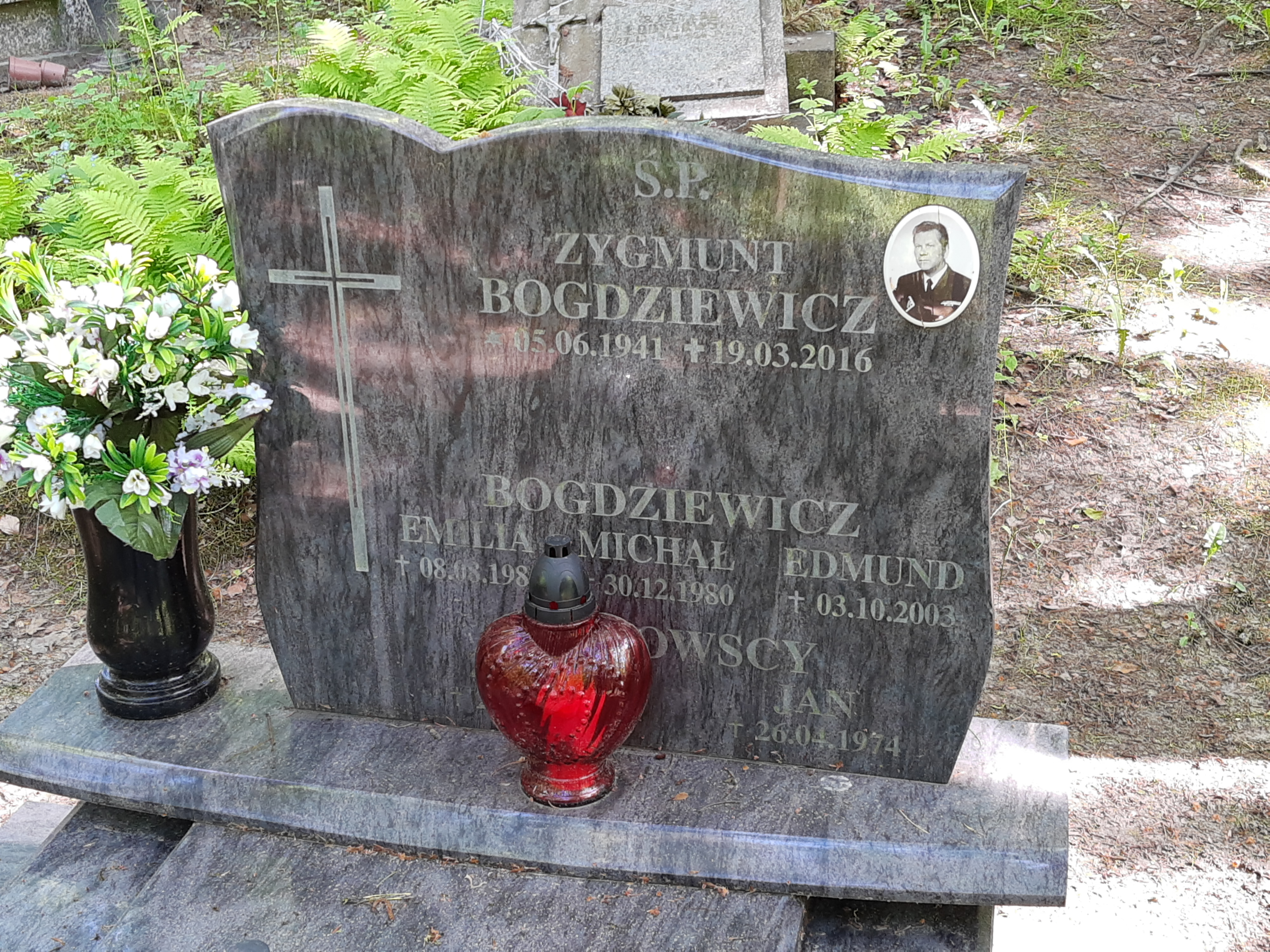
- Grave of Zygmunta Bogdziewicza

Personal information
- Born: 5 June 1941 Kaunas, Lithuanian SSR, Soviet Union
- Died: 19 March 2016 (aged 74)

Sport
- Sport: Sports shooting

Zygmunt Bogdziewicz (5 June 1941 – 19 March 2016) was a Polish sports shooter. He competed at the 1972 Summer Olympics and the 1976 Summer Olympics.
