= Juha Rannikko =

Finnish sports shooter

Personal information
- Nationality: Finnish
- Born: 7 June 1954 (age 70); Muurla, Finland

Sport
- Sport: Sports shooting

Juha Rannikko (born 7 June 1954) is a Finnish sports shooter. He competed in the mixed 50 metre running target event at the 1980 Summer Olympics.
