= Tibor Bodnár =

Hungarian sports shooter (1955–2022)

Personal information
- Nationality: Hungarian
- Born: 31 March 1955; Budapest, Hungary
- Died: 4 February 2022 (aged 66)

Sport
- Sport: Sports shooting

Tibor Bodnár (31 March 1955 – 4 February 2022) was a Hungarian sports shooter. He competed at the 1976 Summer Olympics and the 1980 Summer Olympics. He died in February 2022, at the age of 66.
