= József Sike =

Hungarian sports shooter

József Sike (born 1 May 1968 in Eger) is a Hungarian sport shooter. He competed in the 10 meter running target event at the Summer Olympics in 1992, 1996, and 2000.

== Olympic results ==
Event	1992	1996	2000
10 meter running target (men)	5th	4th	11th
