= Jerzy Greszkiewicz =

Polish sports shooter

Olympic medal record

Shooting

Representing Poland
Bronze medal – third place	1976 Montreal	50 m Running Target

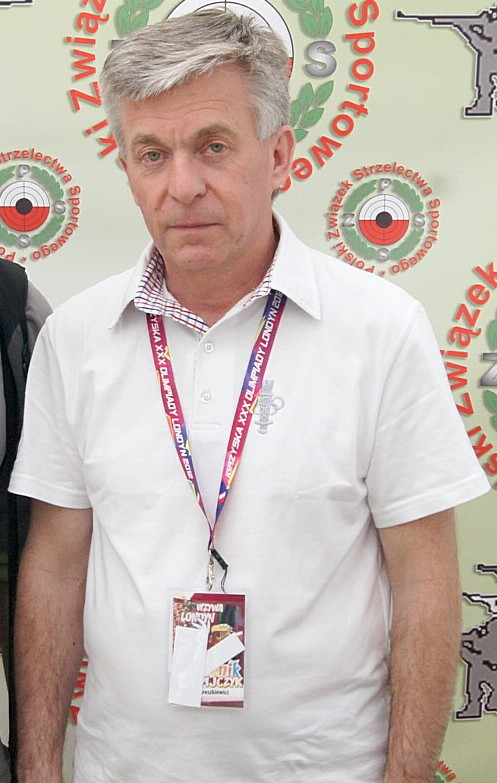
Greszkiewicz Jerzy

Jerzy Greszkiewicz (born 16 January 1950) is a Polish sport shooter, who won a bronze medal in the 50 metre Running Target event at the 1976 Summer Olympics in Montreal.
