= Luboš Račanský =

Czechoslovak sport shooter

Personal information
- Born: 13 March 1964 (age 62) Benešov, Czechoslovakia
Medal record
Men's shooting
Representing Czechoslovakia
Olympic Games
Bronze medal – third place	1992 Barcelona	10 m running target

Luboš Račanský (born 13 March 1964) is a Czech sport shooter who competed for Czechoslovakia. He won the Bronze medal in 10 metre running target in Barcelona in the 1992 Summer Olympics in Barcelona. Račanský was born in Benešov.
