= Mikhail Azarenko =

Russian sport shooter

Personal information
- Full name: Mikhail Mikhaylovich Azarenko
- Nationality: Russian
- Born: 15 September 1991 (age 34) Krasnodar, Russia

Sport
- Country: Russia
- Sport: Shooting
- Event: Running target shooting
- Club: Dinamo
- Coached by: Oleg Libert; Anatoly Asrabayev
Medal record
World Championships
Gold medal – first place	2018 Changwon	50 m running target
Gold medal – first place	2018 Changwon	50 m team running target
Silver medal – second place	2018 Changwon	10 m team running target mixed
Silver medal – second place	2018 Changwon	50 m running target mixed
Silver medal – second place	2018 Changwon	50 m team running target mixed
Bronze medal – third place	2018 Changwon	10 m running target mixed
European Championships
Gold medal – first place	2020 Wroclaw	10 m mixed team running target mixed
Silver medal – second place	2020 Wroclaw	10 m running target
Silver medal – second place	2020 Wroclaw	10 m team running target mixed
Bronze medal – third place	2020 Wroclaw	10 m running target mixed

Mikhail Mikhaylovich Azarenko (Russian: Михаил Михайлович Азаренко; born 15 September 1991) is a Russian sport shooter.

He participated at the 2018 ISSF World Shooting Championships, winning a medal.
