= Gennadi Avramenko =

Ukrainian sport shooter (born 1965)

Personal information
- Born: 27 May 1965 (age 61)
Medal record
Men's Shooting
Representing Soviet Union
Olympic Games
Bronze medal – third place	1988 Seoul	50 m running target

Gennadi Avramenko (born 27 May 1965) is a Ukrainian sport shooter. He competed at the Summer Olympics in 1988 and 1996. In 1988, he won the bronze medal in the men's 50 metre running target event, and in 1996, he tied for 15th place in the men's 10 metre running target event.
