= Pasi Wedman =

Finnish sports shooter

Pasi Wedman (born March 21, 1975, in Kuusamo) is a Finnish sport shooter. He competed at the 2000 Summer Olympics in the men's 10 metre running target event, in which he placed fourth.
