= Igor Sokolov =

Russian sport shooter

Medal record

Representing the Soviet Union

Men's Shooting

Olympic Games
Gold medal – first place	1980 Moscow	50 m Running Target

Igor Sokolov (Russian: Игорь Александрович Соколов; born January 2, 1958) is a former Soviet sport shooter and Olympic champion.

He received a gold medal in 50 m Running Target at the 1980 Summer Olympics in Moscow.
