= József Ángyán (sport shooter) =

Hungarian sports shooter

Personal information
- Nationality: Hungarian
- Born: 18 September 1965 (age 59); Keszthely, Hungary

Sport
- Sport: Sports shooting

József Ángyán (born 18 September 1965) is a Hungarian sports shooter. He competed in the men's 10 metre running target event at the 2000 Summer Olympics.
