= ISSF shooting events =

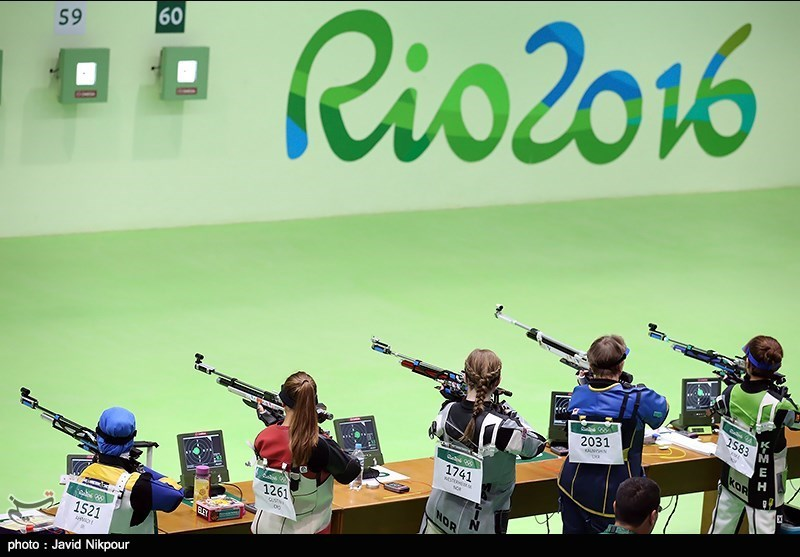
Women's 10 metre air rifle match at the 2016 Summer Olympics.

The International Shooting Sport Federation recognizes several shooting events, some of which have Olympic status. They are divided into four disciplines: rifle, pistol, shotgun and running target.

The main distinctions between different rifle events are the distances to the target and the shooting positions used. For the other disciplines, the position is always standing, and changes include limits to shooting times and different types of targets.

== The present events ==
Event	Olympics			World Championships						Former names
Event	Men	Women	Mixed Team	M	W	Mixed Team	JM (Note: J stands for "junior".)	JW	JMixed Team	Former names
Rifle events
300 metre rifle three positions	1900–1972			✔	✔					Free rifle
300 metre rifle prone				✔	✔					Free rifle
300 metre standard rifle				✔						
50 metre rifle three positions	✔	✔		✔	✔		✔	✔		Free rifle (men); Standard rifle/Sport rifle (women)
50 metre rifle prone	1912–2016			✔	✔		✔	✔		Free rifle (men); Standard rifle/Sport rifle (women)
10 metre air rifle	✔	✔	✔	✔	✔	✔	✔	✔	✔	
Pistol events
50 metre pistol	1896–2016			✔			✔			Free pistol
25 metre pistol		✔			✔		✔	✔		Sport pistol
25 metre rapid fire pistol	✔			✔			✔			
25 metre center-fire pistol				✔						
25 metre standard pistol				✔			✔			
10 metre air pistol	✔	✔	✔	✔	✔	✔	✔	✔	✔	
Shotgun events
Skeet	✔	✔		✔	✔		✔	✔		
Trap	✔	✔	✔	✔	✔	✔	✔	✔	✔	
Double trap	1996–2016	1996–2004		✔			✔			
Running target events
50 metre running target	1972–1988			✔			✔			Running boar
50 metre running target mixed				✔			✔			Running boar
10 metre running target	1992–2004			✔	✔		✔	✔		
10 metre running target mixed				✔	✔		✔	✔		

== Discontinued events ==
Due to the ISSF, some Olympic events have been discontinued in the past. In total, Forty-five ISSF events have been discontinued.

== Common principles ==
All ISSF shooting events consist of precision shooting in the sense that only the position of the shot on the target determines the result, not the time used to produce that shot (provided the time was within the set constraints, of course). This separates them from International Practical Shooting Confederation events and other kinds of action shooting. In rifle, pistol and running target events, the maximum score for each shot is 10 if shots are scored as integers, or 10.9 if scored decimally. In shotgun events, there is only hit or miss.

=== Elimination, qualification, final ===
In the 300 metre rifle events and the 50 metre rifle and pistol events, all participants of a main competition must compete at the same time. If the range capacity is not enough for this, an elimination round is conducted the day before the main competition. From this round, only so many shooters advance as the range capacity can allow. The program of the elimination round is the same as that of the match or qualification round.

The match, or qualification round in case of Olympic events, is then the major part of the competition. In all events except those where elimination rounds are held, shooters are divided as necessary into relays and shoot the match at different times during the competition day. In matches consisting of two stages, all shooters must complete the first stage before the second stage may commence. The stages are often completed on two consecutive days (especially so in 25 metre rapid fire pistol, the shotgun events, and the running target events).

In larger matches, but only in the Olympic events, a final is added to the qualification round. (At a national level, there may be finals even in some non-Olympic events, such as 50 metre rifle prone.) The top eight contestants (or top six in case of the shotgun events and 25 metre rapid fire pistol), qualify for the final. The final consists of 24 shots in the 10 metre air rifle and 10 metre air pistol events, 45 shots across all three positions in the 50 metre rifle three positions event, 20 shots (four five-shot series) in the 25 metre events, and two series in the shotgun events (that is, 50 targets in trap and skeet.) In rifle and pistol finals, the score zones are divided into decimals, so that each final shot may give up to 10.9 points. In shotgun finals, there is still only a hit or a miss, but a special type of clay target with coloured powder is used to make it easier for spectators to immediately see the result. In determining the final result, the qualification score is discarded, so the winner is the shooter with the best aggregate score. Ties are resolved by shooting as many additional shots (or series at 25 metres) as needed to break them.

=== Scoring and tie-breaking ===
In all rifle, pistol and running target events results are recorded in ten-shot series, despite the fact that none of them are actually shot this way; the pure precision events at 300 metres, 50 metres and 10 metres are shot at the shooter's own pace, the 25 metre pistol events are shot in five-shot strings, and the running target events are shot one shot at the time. However, the recorded ten-shot series are used for tie-breaking, so that the participant with the better last series comes before the other. From 2009 however, the number of inner tens, where applicable, will be the first tie-breaking criterion. In events without finals this tie-breaking system can decide championships, while in Olympic events it only decides the qualification and starting order for the finals (or starting order only, in the case of six-shooter finals, where a special shoot-off is held if shooters are tied for the last final place). In 25 metre center-fire pistol and 25 metre standard pistol, ties for medal places are resolved by a one-string shoot-off.

Shotgun events are recorded in series of 25 targets (trap and skeet), 40 targets (women's double trap) or 50 targets (men's double trap).

== History and admittance of new events ==
The first ISSF World Shooting Championships were held in 1897, and while the Olympic shooting program changed heavily until the 1930s, the World Championship program was quite stable. The early events were 300 metre rifle, 50 metre pistol (added 1900), and 300 metre army rifle (added 1911). In 1929, the program was extended with 100 metre running deer, 50 metre rifle and trap. Rapid fire pistol, although a popular Olympic event, was not added until 1933. After World War II, a number of new events were introduced. After the inclusion of the airgun events and 25 metre standard pistol in 1970, however, there have not been many additions, double trap being an exception.

Events can have a status as test events, with rules provided by the ISSF but not actually counted among the ISSF shooting events. 5-shot air pistol is such an event. The development of this 10 metre version of rapid fire pistol is more or less stalled however, as relatively few shooters have the special airguns needed, and several of the countries where the shooting form has some popularity use other rulesets instead of the one suggested by the ISSF. There are also official ISSF rules for automatic trap (also known as ball trap), although there are no ISSF championships in that event.

== Manufacturers ==
Several companies design and manufacture firearms specifically for use in ISSF shooting events. Some companies specialize in air guns (rifle and pistol), while others specialize in pistols whether air powered or small caliber. For shotgun events, guns from traditional shotgun manufacturers are used.

Some manufacturers:

- Anschütz (Germany)
- Benelli (Italy)
- Beretta (Italy)
- Bleiker (Switzerland)
- Feinwerkbau (Germany)
- Hämmerli (Switzerland)
- Morini (Switzerland), specializes in pistols
- Pardini Arms (Italy), specializes in pistols
- Perazzi (Italy), shotguns
- Steyr (Austria), air rifles and air pistols.
- Walther Arms (Germany)

== Books addressing ISSF events ==
- Buhlmann et al., Ways of the Rifle, Rev. Ed. (2009)
- Leatherdale, Frank & Paul Leatherdale, Successful Pistol Shooting, Rev. Ed., Wiltshire, Eng.: Crowood, 1995
- Antal, Dr. Laslo, Competitive Pistol Shooting, 2nd Ed., London: A & C Black, 1989
- Leatherdale, Frank & Paul Leatherdale, Successful Pistol Shooting, Wiltshire, Eng.: Crowood, 1988
- Yur'Yev, A.A., Competitive Shooting, [translation of 1973 work], Washington: National Rifle Association, 1985
- Antal, Dr. Laslo, The Target Gun Book of UIT Pistol Shooting, Droitwitch, Eng.: Peterson, 1985
- Antal, Dr. Laslo & Ragnar Skanaker, Pistol Shooting, Liverpool, [authors], 1985
- Chandler, John, The Target Gun Book of Pistol Coaching, 2nd Ed., Droitwich, Eng.: Peterson, 1985
- Antal, Dr. Laslo, Competitive Pistol Shooting, West Yorkshire: EP, 1983
- Chandler, John, The Target Gun Book of Pistol Coaching, Droitwich, Eng.: Peterson, 1983
- Freeman, Maj Peter Cuthbert, Target Pistol Shooting, London, Faber and Faber, 1981
- Hinchliffe, K.B., Target Pistol Shooting, London: David and Chartes, 1981
- Antal, Dr. Laslo, Pistol Shooting, Small-Bore Pistols and Air Pistols, Know the Game Series, West Yorkshire: EP, 1980
- Standl, Hans, Pistol Shooting as a Sport, New York: Crown, 1976
- Freeman, Maj Peter Cuthbert, Modern Pistol Shooting, London: Faber and Faber, 1968

== See also ==
- List of Olympic medalists in shooting
- List of medalists at the European Shooting Championships
- List of medalists at the European Shotgun Championships
- Discontinued ISSF shooting events
