= András Doleschall =

Hungarian sports shooter

Personal information
- Nationality: Hungarian
- Born: 27 January 1959 (age 66); Budapest, Hungary

Sport
- Sport: Sports shooting

András Doleschall (born 27 January 1959) is a Hungarian sports shooter. He competed at the 1980 Summer Olympics and the 1988 Summer Olympics.
