= Jorma Lievonen =

Finnish sports shooter

Personal information
- Nationality: Finnish
- Born: 17 April 1956 (age 68); Joensuu, Finland

Sport
- Sport: Sports shooting

Jorma Lievonen (born 17 April 1956) is a Finnish sports shooter. He competed at the 1980 Summer Olympics and the 1984 Summer Olympics.
