= Michael Jakosits =

German sport shooter

Personal information
- Full name: Michael Georg Jakosits
- Born: 21 January 1970 (age 56) Zweibrücken, Rheinland-Pfalz, West Germany
Medal record
Men's shooting
Representing Germany
Olympic Games
Gold medal – first place	1992 Barcelona	10 m running target

Michael Georg Jakosits (born 21 January 1970) is a German sports shooter and Olympic champion. He won the gold medal in the 10 metre running target at the 1992 Summer Olympics in Barcelona. He placed fifth at the 2004 Summer Olympics. Jakosits was born in Zweibrücken, Rheinland-Pfalz.
