= Giovanni Mezzani =

Italian sport shooter

Personal information
- Born: 28 December 1952 (age 73) Pistoia, Italy

Sport
- Sport: Sports shooting

Giovanni Mezzani (born 28 December 1952) is an Italian former sport shooter who competed at the 1972, 1976, 1980 and the 1984 Summer Olympics.
