= Manfred Kurzer =

German sports shooter

Medal record

Men's shooting

Representing Germany

Olympic Games
Gold medal – first place	2004 Athens	10 m running target

Manfred Kurzer (born 10 January 1970 in West Berlin, West Germany) is a German sports shooter and Olympic champion.

== Professional career ==
He won the gold medal in the 10 metre running target at the 2004 Summer Olympics in Athens. He placed sixth at the 2000 Summer Olympics.

== Personal life ==
He is currently training soldiers of the army and now lives in Frankfurt.
