= List of flag bearers for Guatemala at the Olympics =

Guatemala at the Olympics
- IOC code: GUA
- NOC: Guatemalan Olympic Committee
- Website: www.cog.org.gt (in Spanish)
- Medals: Gold 1 Silver 1 Bronze 1 Total 3

Summer appearances
- 1952; 1956–1964; 1968; 1972; 1976; 1980; 1984; 1988; 1992; 1996; 2000; 2004; 2008; 2012; 2016; 2020; 2024

Winter appearances
- 1988; 1992–2026

This is a list of flag bearers who have represented Guatemala at the Olympics.

Flag bearers carry the national flag of their country at the opening ceremony of the Olympic Games.

#	Event year	Season	Flag bearer	Sport
1	1952	Summer	Doroteo Flores	Athletics
2	1968	Summer	Teodoro Palacios	Athletics
3	1972	Summer	Víctor Castellanos	Shooting
4	1976	Summer	Edgar Tornez	Weightlifting
5	1980	Summer	Carlos Silva	Shooting
6	1984	Summer	Oswaldo Méndez	Equestrian
7	1988	Winter	Alfredo Rego	Alpine skiing
8	1988	Summer	Carlos Silva	Shooting
9	1992	Summer	Julio Sandoval	Shooting
10	1996	Summer	Julio René Martínez	Athletics
11	2000	Summer	Attila Solti	Shooting
12	2004	Summer	Gisela Morales	Swimming
13	2008	Summer	Kevin Cordón	Badminton
14	2012	Summer	Juan Ignacio Maegli	Sailing
15	2016	Summer	Ana Sofía Gómez	Gymnastics
16	2020	Summer	Juan Ignacio Maegli	Sailing
16	2020	Summer	Isabella Maegli	Sailing
17	2024	Summer	Kevin Cordón	Badminton
17	2024	Summer	Waleska Soto	Shooting

== See also ==
- Guatemala at the Olympics
