= Guatemala at the 2028 Summer Olympics =

- IOC code: GUA
- NOC: Guatemalan Olympic Committee
- Website: www.cog.org.gt (in Spanish)

in Los Angeles, United States 14 July 2028 – 30 July 2028
- Competitors: 1 in 1 sport
- Medals: Gold 0 Silver 0 Bronze 0 Total 0

Summer Olympics appearances (overview)
- 1952; 1956–1964; 1968; 1972; 1976; 1980; 1984; 1988; 1992; 1996; 2000; 2004; 2008; 2012; 2016; 2020; 2024; 2028

Guatemala is expected to compete at the 2028 Summer Olympics in Los Angeles, United States, from 14 to 30 July 2028. This will be the nation's 16th consecutive appearance at the Summer Olympics since 1968, and before that it only had one other appearance, in 1952.

== Competitors ==
The following is the list of number of competitors in the Games.

| Sport | Men | Women | Total |
|---|---|---|---|
| Shooting | 0 | 1 | 1 |
| Total | 0 | 1 | 1 |

== Shooting ==
Guatemala qualified one shooter for the 2028 Summer Olympics when Adriana Ruano won a silver medal at the 2026 ISSF World Shooting Championships.

Women

| Athlete | Event | Qualification | | Final | |
| Athlete | Event | Points | Rank | Points | Rank |
|---|---|---|---|---|---|
| Adriana Ruano | Trap | | | | |
