= Guatemala at the 2008 Summer Olympics =

- IOC code: GUA
- NOC: Guatemalan Olympic Committee
- Website: www.cog.org.gt (in Spanish)

in Beijing
- Competitors: 12 in 9 sports
- Flag bearer: Kevin Cordón
- Medals: Gold 0 Silver 0 Bronze 0 Total 0

Summer Olympics appearances (overview)
- 1952; 1956–1964; 1968; 1972; 1976; 1980; 1984; 1988; 1992; 1996; 2000; 2004; 2008; 2012; 2016; 2020; 2024

Guatemala competed in the 2008 Summer Olympics, held in Beijing, People's Republic of China from August 8 to August 24, 2008. In what was the country's fourteenth Summer Olympics (and fifteenth Olympics including the Winter Olympics) since its debut at the 1952 Summer Olympics in Helsinki, Finland. A total of twelve athletes competed in nine sports and twelve distinct events. It was the lowest number of participants for Guatemala since the 1980 Games in Moscow, USSR. Three of the twelve athletes were taking part in their second Olympics, and one of them, race walker Luis García, participated in his fourth. In any event that involved a progression through rounds (track and field, swimming, etc.), the Guatemalan athletes did not advance past the first round; as of the Beijing Olympics, there had yet to be a Guatemalan medalist. At the opening ceremony, badminton player Kevin Cordón bore Guatemala's flag.

== Background ==
Guatemala is a small Central American country of about 14 million people that is situated to the south of Mexico, the west of Belize, and the northwest of El Salvador and Honduras. Initially a location that was home to the Mayan civilization, Guatemala was noted ruled by any major civilization for several centuries until it became a Spanish colony in the 1500s. After several centuries of Spanish rule, Guatemala declared its independence in 1821. For most of the late 1900s, Guatemala experienced a severe political turbulences and endured a guerrilla war that lasted 36 years. The war formally ended in 1996 with the signing of a peace treaty. The first Guatemalan delegation to the Olympics appeared at the 1952 Summer Olympics in Helsinki, including 21 athletes (among them, one woman) across six different sports. However, Guatemala did not return for the next three Olympic games. It returned at the 1968 Summer Olympics in Mexico City with 48 athletes, its largest delegation yet sent as of the 2012 London Olympics. Since then, Guatemala has consistently appeared at the Summer Olympics, with all delegations (excluding 1972) including over ten athletes. As of 2012, Guatemala had also competed at the 1988 Winter Olympics in Calgary, Alberta, Canada, marking its only Winter Olympic appearance. Prior to and including the Beijing Guatemala competed at fourteen Summer Olympics (thirteen of them consecutive) and a fifteen Olympic games overall. In Olympic history, only one Guatemalan, Erick Barrondo, has won an Olympic medal. That medal was in 2012 when Barrondo won the silver medal in the men's 20 kilometres walk.

The 2008 Olympics delegation from Guatemala was its smallest in the Summer Olympics since its showing at the 1980 Summer Olympics in Moscow, USSR. While four of its 12 athletes participated in track events, Guatemalan athletes also appeared in badminton, boxing, equestrianism, sailing, shooting, swimming, weightlifting and modern pentathlon across 12 distinct events. The youngest Guatemalan athlete in Beijing was 16 years old (Rita Sanz-Agero in modern pentathlon), while the oldest was 44 years old (Juan Romero in shooting). Three female athletes and nine male athletes competed on Guatemala's behalf. Of those, there were no medalists. Badminton player Kevin Cordón carried Guatemala's flag at the opening ceremony.

== Athletics ==
=== Men's competition ===
Alfredo Arévalo Reyes represented Guatemala at the Beijing Olympics as one of its marathon runners. Born on 20 February 1976 in Uspantán, a city in the Guatemalan highlands in the Quiché Department, Arévalo first represented Guatemala at the Olympics in the 2004 Summer Olympics of Athens, Greece at age 28. He finished in 77th place. Arévalo returned to the Olympics at age 32, again participating in the men's marathon. The marathon took place on August 23, including 98 competitors. Of those competitors, 76 finished the event. Arévalo placed 63rd, completing the marathon in 2 hours, 28 minutes and 40 seconds. He placed directly ahead of Qatar's Yousf Othman Qader (two hours, 28 minutes and 26 seconds) and behind Montenegrin athlete Goran Stojiljkovic (two hours, 28 minutes and 14 seconds). In comparison, the gold medalist, Samuel Kamau Wanjiru, who broke the Olympic record, finished the event in 2 hours, 6 minutes and 32 seconds, while last-place finalist Atsushi Sato of Japan finished in 2 hours, 41 minutes and 8 seconds. Arévalo was 21 minutes and 54 seconds behind Kamau.

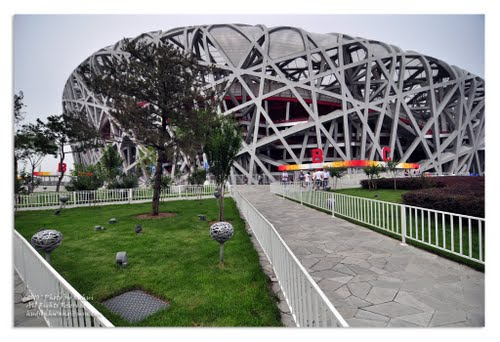
The Beijing National Stadium, where the four Guatemalan track athletes took part in their events

José Amado García Gabriel also competed for Guatemala at the Beijing Olympics, and represented the nation in the men's marathon as well. García was born on 13 September 1977 in San Jerónimo, a small town in central Guatemala's highlands within the Baja Verapaz Department.His first in the Olympics was the Athens Olympics of 2004, when he was 26 years old at the time of his participation. He returned to participate in the event again at age 30 in the 2008 Olympics. He competed in the event on August 23 alongside 97 other athletes (of which 75 finished). García placed 35th after finishing the event in 2 hours, 20 minutes and 15 seconds. García placed directly ahead of Eritrea's Yonas Kifle (two hours, 20 minutes and 23 seconds) and directly behind Poland's Henryk Szost (two hours, 19 minutes and 43 seconds). He was 19 minutes and 49 seconds behind the gold medalist Kamau. García finished approximately eight minutes ahead of Arévalo.

Luis Fernando García Bechinie competed on Guatemala's behalf at the Beijing Olympics, competing the men's 50 kilometers walk. Born on 13 September 1974 in Amatitlán, a town within the vicinity of the national capital Guatemala City, García has represented Guatemala in competitive racewalking since age 21, when he competed in the men's 20 kilometers race walk in Atlanta, Georgia, United States during the 1996 Summer Olympics. He returned during the 2000 Summer Olympics in Sydney, Australia, participating in the same event, and later participated in the men's 50 meters race walk while at the 2004 Summer Olympics in Athens, Greece at 29 years old. Luis García participated in the men's 50 meters race walk as a 33-year-old at the Beijing Olympics. During the August 21 event, García participated alongside 60 other athletes. Of those 60, 46 of them finished the event. García ranked 22nd, having finished the race in 3 hours, 56 minutes and 58 seconds. He placed ahead of Mexico's Ivan Flores (3h58:04) and behind China's Zhao Chengliang (3h56:47). In comparison, Alex Schwazer of Italy, who won the gold medal, finished the event in 3 hours, 37 minutes and 9 seconds (breaking the Olympic record), and last-place finalist Kazimir Verkin of Slovakia finished the race in 4 hours, 21 minutes and 26 seconds.

=== Women's competition ===
Evelyn Rosmeri Núñez Fuentes was the sole female Guatemalan track athlete participating in the Beijing Olympics. Born on 9 April 1971 in Guatemala's capital Guatemala City, in 1971, Núñez participated at the Beijing Olympics at the age of 37 in the women's 20 kilometers race walk. She had not previously competed in any Olympic games. Her race took place on August 20, where Núñez faced 47 other athletes. Of those 47 competitors, 42 finished the race. Núñez ranked last of the 43 finishing athletes, completing the race walk in 1 hour, 44 minutes and 13 seconds. Latvia's Jolanta Dukure ranked immediately ahead of her (1h41:03), while Greece's Despina Zapounidou ranked ahead of Dukere (1h39:11). Russia's Olga Kaniskina won the gold medal, breaking an Olympic record in the process (1h26:31). Núñez was 17 minutes and 42 seconds behind Kaniskina.

=== Summary ===
Key

- Note–Ranks given for track events are within the athlete's heat only
- Q = Qualified for the next round
- q = Qualified for the next round as a fastest loser or, in field events, by position without achieving the qualifying target
- NR = National record
- N/A = Round not applicable for the event
- Bye = Athlete not required to compete in round

Men

Athlete	Event	Final	
Athlete	Event	Result	Rank
Alfredo Arévalo	Marathon	2:28:26	63
José Amado García	Marathon	2:20:15	35
Luis Fernando García	50 km walk	3:56:58	22

Women

Athlete	Event	Final	
Athlete	Event	Result	Rank
Evelyn Núñez	20 km walk	1:44:13	43

== Badminton ==
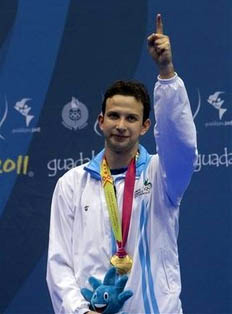
The badminton player Kevin Cordón.

Kevin Haroldo Cordón Buezo represented Guatemala as its only badminton player at the Beijing Olympics. Born on 28 November 1986 in La Unión, a town in the inland Zacapa Department that lies on the Honduran border, Cordón was 21 years old at the time he competed in the Beijing Olympics in men's singles badminton. He did not previously compete in any Olympic games. On August 11, during the first round, Cordón faced China's Bao Chunlai. In his first match against Bao that took 17 minutes, Cordón lost, scoring 17 points while his Chinese opponent reached 21 points. He also lost in his second round match that took 19 minutes, where he scored 16 to Bao's 21 points. Losing the match, Kevin Cordón did not advance to later rounds.

Athlete	Event	Round of 64	Round of 32	Round of 16	Quarterfinal	Semifinal	Final / BM	
Athlete	Event	Opposition Score	Opposition Score	Opposition Score	Opposition Score	Opposition Score	Opposition Score	Rank
Kevin Cordón	Men's singles	Bye	Bao Cl (CHN); L 17–21, 16–21	Did not advance				

== Boxing ==
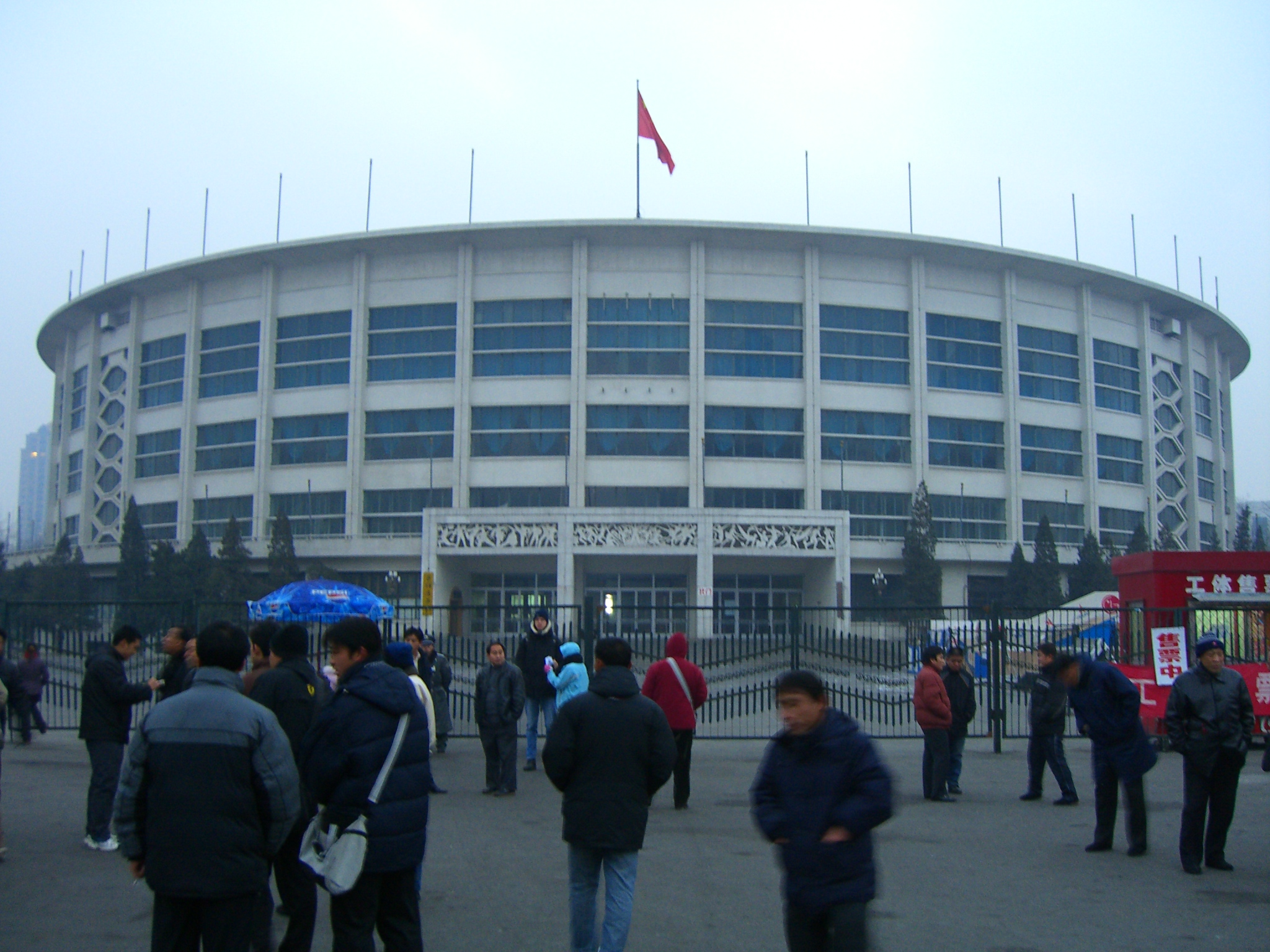
The Workers' Indoor Arena, where Valenzuela and other boxers participated in their events.

Guatemala qualified one boxer for the Olympic boxing tournament. Eddie Valenzuela Barrillas qualified for the flyweight class at the second Americas qualifying tournament, competing in the Beijing Olympics as the only boxer representing Guatemala. Born in 1982 in Guatemala City, the national capital, Valenzuela was 25 years old at the time he entered Beijing as a competitor in the men's flyweight class, which includes athletes below 51 kilograms in weight. He had not previously competed at any Olympic games. The preliminary round of the event took place on August 12, and Valenzuela participated in the ninth bout of the event. He was paired with Thai boxer Somjit Jongjohor. While managing to score a single punch on Jongjohor, the Thai athlete scored six on Valenzuela and defeated him. While Valenzuela did not progress to later rounds, Jongjohor eventually won the gold medal in the event.

Athlete	Event	Round of 32	Round of 16	Quarterfinals	Semifinals	Final	
Athlete	Event	Opposition Result	Opposition Result	Opposition Result	Opposition Result	Opposition Result	Rank
Eddie Valenzuela	Flyweight	Jongjohor (THA); L 1–6	Did not advance				

== Equestrian ==
Juan Andrés Rodríguez Silva participated on Guatemala's behalf as its only equestrian athlete in the Beijing Olympics. Born in September 1971, Rodríguez was 36 years old at the time he participated in Beijing, where he qualified for the individual jumping event. He had not previously competed in any Olympic games. During the first part of the August 15 preliminary round, Rodríguez and Orestus accrued eight points from jump penalties and one point from a time penalty, earning nine penalty points overall. Of the 77 competitors in this first portion of the event, Rodríguez tied Venezuela's Pablo Barros and Mexico's Enrique Gonzalez for 52nd place. In the second round, the pair again accrued seven jumping penalties and one time penalty, bringing their total up to 18 penalty points. This placed Rodríguez at 40th place out of the 71 finishing athletes, tying German riders Ludger Beerbaum and Christian Ahlmann as well as Brazil's Camila Benedicto. In the third round, Rodríguez and Orestus accrued 12 jumping penalties and a single time penalty, raising their total to 31 penalty points. With this, Juan Rodríguez ranked 41st in the event.

Athlete	Horse	Event	Qualification								Final					Total	
Athlete	Horse	Event	Round 1		Round 2			Round 3			Round A		Round B			Total	
Athlete	Horse	Event	Penalties	Rank	Penalties	Total	Rank	Penalties	Total	Rank	Penalties	Rank	Penalties	Total	Rank	Penalties	Rank
Juan Andrés Rodríguez	Orestus VDL	Individual	9	52 Q	9	18	40 Q	13	31	41	Did not advance					31	41

== Modern pentathlon ==
Rita Isabel Sanz-Agero Luna represented Guatemala as its only modern pentathlete at the Beijing Olympics. Born on 8 November 1991 in the national capital Guatemala City, Sanz-Agero is the daughter of María Isabel Sanz; the granddaughter of Rita de Luna; and the niece of Silvia de Luna, all of whom were Olympic athletes as well. Sanz-Agero was 16 years old at the time she participated in the women's individual modern pentathlon. She had not previously appeared at any Olympic games. Olympic modern pentathlon involved five events: shooting, fencing, swimming, riding and running. At the shooting portion of the pentathlon, Sanz-Agero scored 171 points in the event, which translated to the 988 points that were added to her total score. She placed ahead of Kazakh pentathlete Ldad Jiyenbalanova and behind Hungary's Leila Gyenesei. During the fencing portion of the event, Sanz-Agero won seven matches and lost 28. Overall, she earned 568 points and ranked 35 out of the event's 36 athletes. She defeated the United States' Sheila Taormina (4 wins, 31 losses), but fell behind Germany's Eva Trautmann (9 wins, 26 losses) in a competition led by Germany's Lena Schoneborn (28 wins, 7 losses). The next phase involved swimming 200 meters, a race that Sanz-Agero competed in 2:29.41. She placed in between Belarusian athlete Anastasiya Samusevich (2:29.64) and Mexico's Marlene Sanchez (2:27.39). Her score translated into 1,128 points, which was added to her overall score. The penultimate event of the pentathlon was show jumping. The Guatemalan athlete accrued 84 obstacle penalties, but no time or warm-up penalties, finishing the event in 1:08.38. This score translated in into 1,116 points, placing Sanz-Agero ahead of Russia's Tatiana Muratova and behind Italy's Claudia Corsini. The pentathlon's final event involved running a three-kilometer race. Finishing at 11:09.98, Sanz-Agero ranked 34th, defeating Australia's Angie Darby (11:21.96) and falling behind South Korea's Yun Chorong (11:47.30). Rita Sanz-Agero's total score was 4,844, placing her in 34th place out of the event's 36 competitors. She again ranked ahead of Darby (4,814 points) and behind Yun (4,872 points). For comparison, the last place finalist, Jiyenbalanova, received 3,736 points, while gold medalist Schoneborn earned 5,762 points.

Athlete	Event	Shooting (10 m air pistol)			Fencing (épée one touch)			Swimming (200 m freestyle)			Riding (show jumping)			Running (3000 m)			Total points	Final rank
Athlete	Event	Points	Rank	MP Points	Results	Rank	MP points	Time	Rank	MP points	Penalties	Rank	MP points	Time	Rank	MP Points	Total points	Final rank
Rita Sanz-Agero	Women's	171	31	988	7–28	35	568	2:29.41	32	1128	84	18	1116	11:09.98	29	1044	4844	34

== Sailing ==
Juan Ignacio Maegli represented Guatemala as its only sailor at the Beijing Olympics. Born in July 1988, Maegli was 20 years old upon his participation in Beijing in the men's one-person Laser-class dinghy. He is the son of Guatemalan Olympian Juan Maegli. In his event, there were 43 competitors. Maegli was disqualified in the first round, earning 44 points. In the second round, however, Maegli earned 9 points, ranking ahead of Finland's Pierre Angelo Collura (10 points) and behind Portugal's Gustavo Lima (8 points). The third race place Maegli at 39th ahead of New Zealand's Andrew Murdoch (40 points) and behind the Czech Republic's Martin Trcka (37 points). At the end of the fourth race, Maegli placed 16th ahead of Japan's Yoichi Iijima (17 points) and behind Danish athlete Anders Nyholm (15 points), while in the fifth race, the Guatemalan sailor received a black flag, earning 44 points. Maegli ranked 39th in the seventh race between Barbados' Gregory Douglas (40 points) and the Netherlands' Rutger van Schaardenburg (38 points), 32nd in the eighth race between Thomas Barrows III of the United States Virgin Islands (31 points) and Singapore's Seng Leong Loh (33 points), and 12th on the ninth and final race between Australia's Tom Slingsby (11 points) and Spain's Javier Hernandez (13 points). Of the 43 athletes participating in these events, Maegli ranked 33rd, earning a collective 206 points across all nine races. He was three points greater than Allan Julie of the Seychelles, who ranked ahead of him, and nine points less than the Netherlands' van Schaardenburg, who ranked behind him. In comparison, 43rd-place finisher Gregory Douglas of Barbados earned 299 points, while gold medalist Paul Goodison of Great Britain earned 63 points.

Men

Athlete	Event	Race											Net points	Final rank
Athlete	Event	1	2	3	4	5	6	7	8	9	10	M*	Net points	Final rank
Juan Ignacio Maegli	Laser	~~44~~	9	39	16	44	32	39	12	15	CAN	EL	206	33

M = Medal race; EL = Eliminated – did not advance into the medal race; CAN = Race cancelled;

== Shooting ==
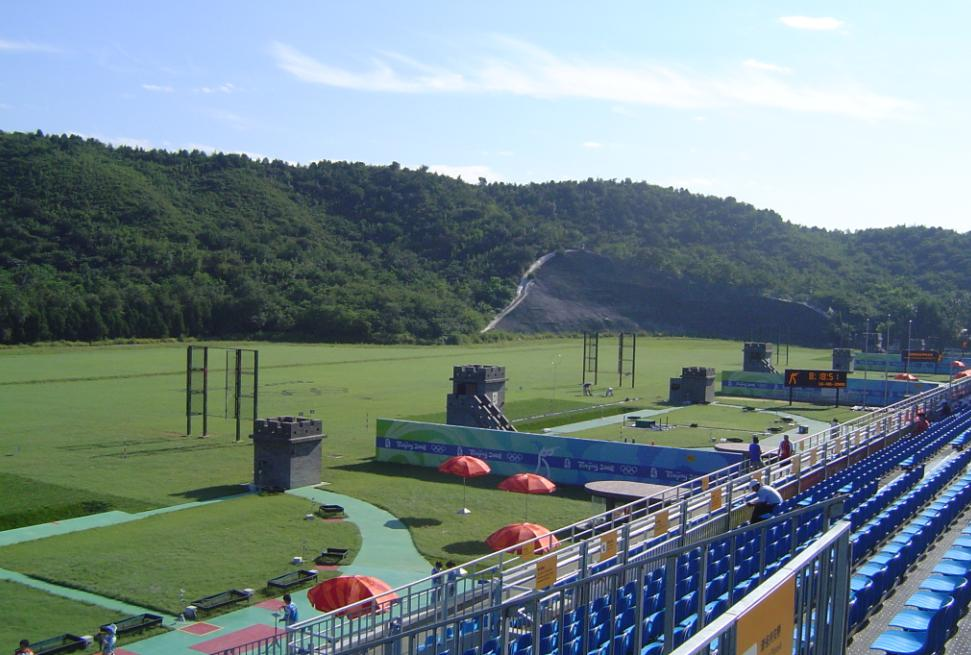
The Beijing Shooting Range Clay Target Field, where Romero took part in his event.

Juan Carlos Romero Arribas represented Guatemala as its only shooter at the Beijing Olympics, participating in the men's skeet event. Born in 1963, Romero made his Olympic debut at the 1996 Summer Olympics in Atlanta, where he competed in men's skeet and ranked 26th in the final round as a 40-year-old. He returned in the Sydney Olympics in 2000 as a 26-year-old, finishing in 35th place, and returned again to the Olympics in Beijing at age 48. Romero participated in five rounds within the event. In the first round, he scored 24 points; in the second, 21; in the third, 23; in the fourth, 21; and in the fifth and final round, 22. In total, he scored 111 points. In the final standings, Juan Romero placed 26th out of the 41 participating shooters. The gold medalist, Vincent Hancock, scored 145 points, 34 more points than Romero.

Athlete	Event	Qualification		Final	
Athlete	Event	Points	Rank	Points	Rank
Juan Carlos Romero	Skeet	111	26	Did not advance	

== Swimming ==
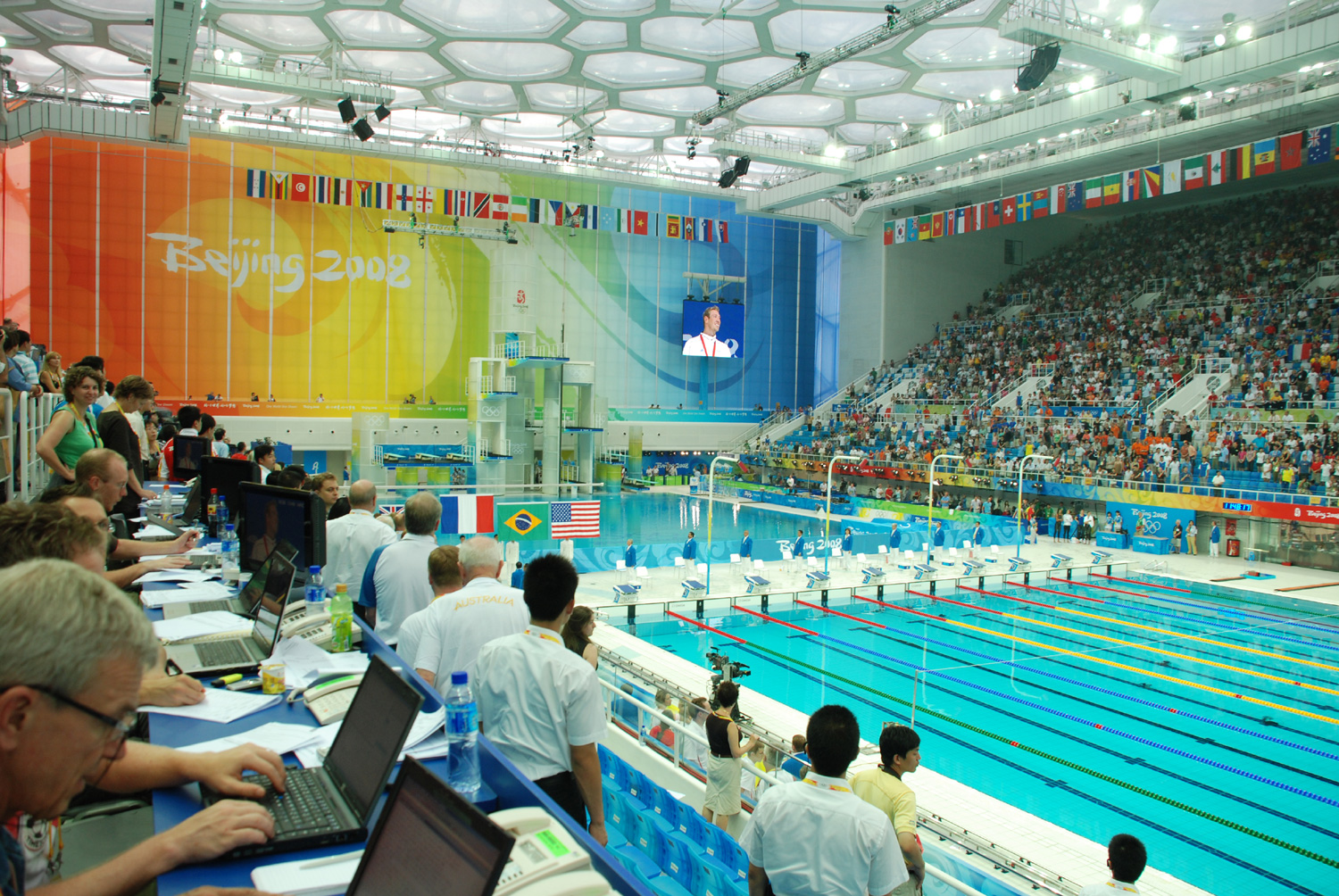
The Beijing National Aquatics Center, where Morales participated in her events.

Gisela María Morales Valentín was Guatemala's only swimmer at the Beijing Olympics. Born in December 1987, Morales was 16 at the time of her first Olympic performance, when she swam in the women's 100 meters backstroke and the women's 200 meters backstroke at the 2004 Athens Olympics. She respectively ranked 27th and 26th in those events' qualification rounds. Morales visited Beijing as a 20-year-old Olympian. In the women's 100 meters, Morales took place in the August 10 preliminary round's second heat. Six swimmers participated in her heat. With a time of 1:02.92, Morales placed second ahead of Serbian third place finalist Marica Strazmester (1:03.56) and behind Polish first place finalist Zuzanna Mazurek (1:02.77). Of the 47 athletes who finished their events, Morales placed 38th. She did not advance to later rounds.

Gisela Morales also represented Guatemala in the women's 200 meters backstroke, the second time she participated in the Olympics in that event. During the preliminary round of the event, which took place on August 14, Morales was placed in the first heat against two other athletes. She finished the race in 2:14.54, placing second ahead of last place heat finalist Erin Nicole Volcan Smith of Venezuela (2:15.58) and behind heat leader Kang Yeongseo of South Korea (2:14.52). Overall, 34 athletes finished in the event, and Morales ranked in 27th place. She did not advance to the next round.

Women

Athlete	Event	Heat		Semifinal		Final	
Athlete	Event	Time	Rank	Time	Rank	Time	Rank
Gisela Morales	100 m backstroke	1:02.92	38	Did not advance			
Gisela Morales	200 m backstroke	2:14.54	27	Did not advance			

== Weightlifting ==
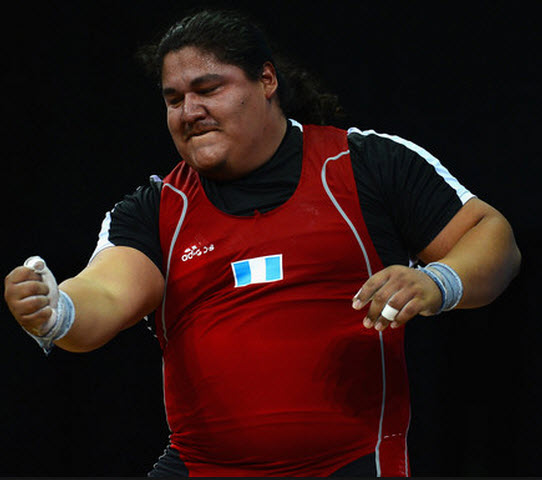
The weightlifter Christian Alberto López Bobadilla.

Christian Alberto López Bobadilla participated on Guatemala's behalf as the nation's only weightlifter at the Beijing Olympics. Born on 30 March 1984 in the city of Coatepeque in the Quetzaltenango Department, which lies in the nation's western highlands near to the Pacific Ocean, López was 24 at the time he participated in the Beijing Olympics. He was placed in the heavyweight class, which included people under 105 kilograms in weight. The event took place on August 18, and López was placed in the first group of athletes. He was the only competitor from the Western Hermisphere in the event. During the snatch portion of the event, the Guatemalan was given three attempts to lift the weights. On his first attempt, he lifted 150 kilograms successfully. He unsuccessfully attempted to lift 155 kilograms on his second and third tries. During the clean and jerk phrase of the event, López was again given three tries; he successfully lifted 180 kilograms on his first attempt, failed to lift 186 kilograms on his second, and successfully raised 186 kilograms on his final attempt. Since his highest scores were 150 and 186 (respectively in snatch and clean and jerk), his end score was 336 kilograms. Of the 17 athletes who finished the event, López ranked 16th. He placed ahead of Italy's Moreno Boer (330 points) and behind the Czech Republic's Libor Walzer (350 points).

Athlete	Event	Snatch		Clean & Jerk		Total	Rank
Athlete	Event	Result	Rank	Result	Rank	Total	Rank
Christian López	Men's −105 kg	150	17	186	17	336	17

== See also ==
- Guatemala at the 2007 Pan American Games
- Guatemala at the 2010 Central American and Caribbean Games
