= Guatemala at the 2020 Summer Olympics =

- IOC code: GUA
- NOC: Guatemalan Olympic Committee
- Website: www.cog.org.gt (in Spanish)

in Tokyo, Japan July 23, 2021 – August 8, 2021
- Competitors: 24 in 10 sports
- Flag bearers (opening): Isabella Maegli; Juan Ignacio Maegli
- Flag bearer (closing): Charles Fernández
- Medals: Gold 0 Silver 0 Bronze 0 Total 0

Summer Olympics appearances (overview)
- 1952; 1956–1964; 1968; 1972; 1976; 1980; 1984; 1988; 1992; 1996; 2000; 2004; 2008; 2012; 2016; 2020; 2024

Guatemala competed at the 2020 Summer Olympics in Tokyo. Originally scheduled to take place from 24 July to 9 August 2020, the Games were postponed to 23 July to 8 August 2021, because of the COVID-19 pandemic. It was the nation's fifteenth appearance at the Summer Olympics since its debut in 1952, despite failing to register any athletes in three other editions (1956 to 1964).

== Competitors ==
The following is the list of number of competitors participating in the Games:

Sport	Men	Women	Total
Athletics	7	2	9
Badminton	1	1	2
Cycling	1	0	1
Judo	1	0	1
Modern pentathlon	1	0	1
Rowing	0	2	2
Sailing	1	1	2
Shooting	1	2	3
Swimming	1	1	2
Weightlifting	0	1	1
Total	14	10	24

== Athletics ==
Guatemalan athletes further achieved the entry standards, either by qualifying time or by world ranking, in the following track and field events (up to a maximum of 3 athletes in each event):

Key

- Note–Ranks given for track events are within the athlete's heat only
- Q = Qualified for the next round
- q = Qualified for the next round as a fastest loser or, in field events, by position without achieving the qualifying target
- NR = National record
- N/A = Round not applicable for the event
- Bye = Athlete not required to compete in round

Track and road events
Men

Athlete	Event	Heat		Final	
Athlete	Event	Result	Rank	Result	Rank
Luis Grijalva	5000 m	13:34.11	10 q	13:10.09 NR	12
José Alejandro Barrondo	20 km walk	—N/a		1:26:55	30
José Oswaldo Calel	20 km walk	—N/a		DSQ	
José Eduardo Ortiz	20 km walk	—N/a		1:28:57	40
Bernardo Barrondo	50 km walk	—N/a		4:08:34	34
Érick Barrondo	50 km walk	—N/a		DSQ	
Luis Ángel Sánchez	50 km walk	—N/a		DNF	

Women

Athlete	Event	Final	
Athlete	Event	Result	Rank
Mayra Herrera	20 km walk	1:44:30	50
Mirna Ortiz	20 km walk	1:40:23	44

== Badminton ==
Guatemala entered two badminton players to compete into the Olympic tournament. Slated to compete at his fourth consecutive Games, Kevin Cordón was selected among the top 40 individual shuttlers to compete in the men's singles based on the BWF World Race to Tokyo Rankings, with Nikté Sotomayor accepting a spare berth freed up by one of the original entrants on the women's side.

Athlete	Event	Group Stage			Elimination	Quarterfinal	Semifinal	Final / BM	
Athlete	Event	Opposition Score	Opposition Score	Rank	Opposition Score	Opposition Score	Opposition Score	Opposition Score	Rank
Kevin Cordón	Men's singles	Muñoz (MEX); W (21–14, 21–12)	Ng K L (HKG); W (22–20, 21–13)	1 Q	Caljouw (NED); W (21–17, 3–21, 21–19)	Heo K-h (KOR); W (21–13, 21–18)	Axelsen (DEN); L (18–21, 11–21)	Ginting (INA); L (11–21, 13–21)	4
Nikté Sotomayor	Women's singles	Li (CAN); L (8–21, 9–21)	Repiská (SVK); L (19–21, 12–21)	3	Did not advance				

== Cycling ==
=== Road ===
Guatemala entered one rider to compete in the men's Olympic road race, by virtue of his top 50 national finish (for men) in the UCI World Ranking.

Athlete	Event	Time	Rank
Manuel Rodas	Men's road race	Did not finish	

== Judo ==
Guatemala qualified one judoka for the men's extra-lightweight category (60 kg) at the Games. Rio 2016 Olympian José Ramos accepted a continental berth from the Americas as the nation's top-ranked judoka outside of direct qualifying position in the IJF World Ranking List of June 28, 2021.

Athlete	Event	Round of 32	Round of 16	Quarterfinals	Semifinals	Repechage	Final / BM	
Athlete	Event	Opposition Result	Opposition Result	Opposition Result	Opposition Result	Opposition Result	Opposition Result	Rank
José Ramos	Men's −60 kg	Lesiuk (UKR); L 00–10	Did not advance					

== Modern pentathlon ==
Guatemalan athletes qualified for the following spots to compete in modern pentathlon. Rio 2016 Olympian Charles Fernández secured a selection in men's event with a gold medal victory at the 2019 Pan American Games in Lima.

Athlete	Event	Fencing (épée one touch)				Swimming (200 m freestyle)			Riding (show jumping)			Combined: shooting/running (10 m air pistol)/(3200 m)			Total points	Final rank
Athlete	Event	RR	BR	Rank	MP points	Time	Rank	MP points	Penalties	Rank	MP points	Time	Rank	MP points	Total points	Final rank
Charles Fernández	Men's	13-22	1	29	179	1:58.16	8	314	81	32	219	11:06.56	10	634	1346	27

== Rowing ==
Guatemala qualified one boat in the women's lightweight double sculls for the Games by finishing last in the A-final and securing the second of three berths available at the 2021 FISA Americas Olympic Qualification Regatta in Rio de Janeiro, Brazil, signifying the country's return to the sport for the first time since 1984.

Athlete	Event	Heats		Repechage		Semifinals		Final	
Athlete	Event	Time	Rank	Time	Rank	Time	Rank	Time	Rank
Yulissa López; Jenniffer Zúñiga	Women's lightweight double sculls	7:53.35	6 R	8:13.27	6 FC	Bye		7:27.51	18

Qualification Legend: FA=Final A (medal); FB=Final B (non-medal); FC=Final C (non-medal); FD=Final D (non-medal); FE=Final E (non-medal); FF=Final F (non-medal); SA/B=Semifinals A/B; SC/D=Semifinals C/D; SE/F=Semifinals E/F; QF=Quarterfinals; R=Repechage

== Sailing ==
Guatemalan sailors qualified one boat in each of the following classes through the class-associated Worlds, and the continental regattas.

Athlete	Event	Race											Net points	Final rank
Athlete	Event	1	2	3	4	5	6	7	8	9	10	M*	Net points	Final rank
Juan Ignacio Maegli	Men's Laser	6	24	~~25~~	24	10	23	18	19	20	5	EL	149	19
Isabella Maegli	Women's Laser Radial	26	29	32	9	34	~~40~~	31	34	5	18	EL	218	29

M = Medal race; EL = Eliminated – did not advance into the medal race

== Shooting ==
Guatemalan shooters achieved quota places for the following events by virtue of their best finishes at the 2018 ISSF World Championships, the 2019 ISSF World Cup series, the 2019 Pan American Games, and Championships of the Americas, as long as they obtained a minimum qualifying score (MQS) by May 31, 2020.

Athlete	Event	Qualification		Final	
Athlete	Event	Points	Rank	Points	Rank
Juan Schaeffer	Men's skeet	107	30	Did not advance	
Adriana Ruano	Women's trap	110	26	Did not advance	
Ana Waleska Soto	Women's trap	113	23	Did not advance	

== Swimming ==
Guatemalan swimmers further achieved qualifying standards in the following events (up to a maximum of 2 swimmers in each event at the Olympic Qualifying Time (OQT), and potentially 1 at the Olympic Selection Time (OST)):

Athlete	Event	Heat		Semifinal		Final	
Athlete	Event	Time	Rank	Time	Rank	Time	Rank
Luis Martínez	Men's 100 m butterfly	51.29 NR	7 Q	51.30	8 Q	51.09 NR	7
Gabriela Santis	Women's 200 m freestyle	2:07.24	27	Did not advance			

== Weightlifting ==
Guatemala entered one female weightlifter into the Olympic competition. Scarleth Ucelo accepted a spare berth unused by Oceania as the next highest-ranked weightlifter vying for qualification in the women's +87 kg category based on the IWF Absolute World Rankings.

Athlete	Event	Snatch		Clean & Jerk		Total	Rank
Athlete	Event	Result	Rank	Result	Rank	Total	Rank
Scarleth Ucelo	Women's +87 kg	87	12	116	13	203	13

== See also ==
- Guatemala at the 2019 Pan American Games
