= Guatemala at the 1988 Summer Olympics =

- IOC code: GUA
- NOC: Guatemalan Olympic Committee

in Seoul
- Competitors: 28 (25 men and 3 women) in 8 sports
- Flag bearer: Carlos Silva
- Medals: Gold 0 Silver 0 Bronze 0 Total 0

Summer Olympics appearances (overview)
- 1952; 1956–1964; 1968; 1972; 1976; 1980; 1984; 1988; 1992; 1996; 2000; 2004; 2008; 2012; 2016; 2020; 2024

Guatemala competed at the 1988 Summer Olympics in Seoul, South Korea. 28 competitors, 25 men and 3 women, took part in 16 events in 8 sports.

== Competitors ==
The following is the list of number of competitors in the Games.

Sport	Men	Women	Total
Athletics	0	1	1
Boxing	1	–	1
Cycling	5	0	5
Football	17	–	17
Gymnastics	0	1	1
Shooting	1	0	1
Swimming	0	1	1
Wrestling	1	–	1
Total	25	3	28

== Athletics ==
Women
Track and road events

Athlete	Event	Final	
Athlete	Event	Time	Rank
María del Pilar	Marathon	2:51:33	53

== Boxing ==
Athlete	Event	Round of 64	Round of 32	Round of 16	Quarterfinals	Semifinals	Final	
Athlete	Event	Opposition Result	Opposition Result	Opposition Result	Opposition Result	Opposition Result	Opposition Result	Rank
Giovanni Pérez	Bantamweight	Bye	McKinney (USA); L RSC R1	Did not advance				

== Cycling ==
Five male cyclists represented Guatemala in 1988.

=== Road ===
Men

Athlete	Event	Time	Rank
Óscar Aquino	Road race	4:32:56	86
Víctor Lechuga	Road race	4:44:37	100
Andrés Torres	Road race	4:32:56	84
Óscar Aquino; Julio Illescas; Víctor Lechuga; Andrés Torres	Team time trial	2:18:58.7	26

=== Track ===
Time trial

Athlete	Event	Time	Rank
Max Leiva	Time trial	1:09.214	23

== Football ==
Key:

- A.E.T – After extra time.
- P – Match decided by penalty-shootout.

Team	Event	Group stage				Quarterfinal	Semi-final	Final / BM	
Team	Event	Opposition Score	Opposition Score	Opposition Score	Rank	Opposition Score	Opposition Score	Opposition Score	Rank
Guatemala men's	Men's tournament	Italy; L 2–5	Iraq; L 0–3	Zambia; L 0–4	4	Did not advance			

Team roster

Head coach: Jorge Roldán

No.	Pos.	Player	DoB	Age	Caps	Club	Tournament games	Tournament goals	Minutes played	Sub off	Sub on	Cards yellow/red
1	GK	Ricardo Jérez	6 August 1956	32	?	(Guatemala) Comunicaciones	2	0	180	0	0	0
2	DF	Juan Manuel Dávila	7 June 1963	25	?	(Guatemala) Aurora	3	0	270	0	0	0
3	DF	Allan Wellmann	26 May 1954	34	?	(Guatemala) Aurora	2	0	180	0	0	0
4	DF	Rocael Mazariegos	8 January 1966	22	?	(Guatemala) Juventud Retalteca	3	0	258	1	0	0
5	DF	Victor Hugo Monzón	12 November 1957	30	?	(Guatemala) Aurora	3	0	225	1	0	0
6	MF	Jaime Batres	28 June 1964	24	?	(Guatemala) Galcasa	3	0	216	1	1	0
7	FW	Carlos Castañeda	4 January 1963	25	?	(Guatemala) Suchitepéquez	3	1	270	0	0	0
8	MF	Juan Manuel Funes	16 May 1966	22	?	(Guatemala) Municipal	2	0	180	0	0	0
9	FW	Adán Paniagua	30 November 1955	32	?	(Guatemala) Juventud Retalteca	2	1	180	0	0	0
10	MF	Byron Pérez	18 March 1959	29	?	(Guatemala) Municipal	3	0	270	0	0	(yellow card) 1
11	FW	Norman Delva	15 July 1969	19	?	(Guatemala) Deportivo Izabal	2	0	111	0	1	0
12	FW	Kevin Sandoval	18 August 1962	26	?	(Guatemala) Aurora	2	0	70	1	1	0
13	MF	Luis López	20 June 1951	37	?	(Guatemala) Juventud Retalteca	1	0	90	0	0	0
14	MF	Otoniel Guevara	15 November 1959	28	?	(Guatemala) Bandegua	0	0	0	0	0	0
15	DF	Alejandro Ortíz Obregón	1 August 1958	30	?	(Guatemala) Suchitepéquez	2	0	102	0	1	(yellow card) 1
16	DF	David Gardiner	11 February 1957	31	?	(Guatemala) Galcasa	1	0	29	0	1	0
17	MF	Julio Rodas	9 December 1966	21	?	(Guatemala) Municipal	3	0	249	1	0	0
18	GK	Ricardo Piccinini	7 September 1949	39	?	(Guatemala) Municipal	1	0	90	0	0	0
19	MF	Eddy Alburez	29 June 1960	28	?	(Guatemala) Galcasa	0	0	0	0	0	0

Group play

Pos	Team	Pld	W	D	L	GF	GA	GD	Pts
1	Zambia	3	2	1	0	10	2	+8	5
2	Italy	3	2	0	1	7	6	+1	4
3	Iraq	3	1	1	1	5	4	+1	3
4	Guatemala	3	0	0	3	2	12	−10	0

Source: FIFA
17 September 1988

Italy	5–2	Guatemala
Carnevale 3'; Evani 11'; Virdis 34'; Ferrara 38'; Desideri 75'	[Report]	Castañeda 7'; Paniagua 79'

Gwangju Mudeung Stadium, Gwangju

19 September 1988

Iraq	3–0	Guatemala
Radhi 57'; Jabbar 67'; Mazariegos 77' (o.g.)	[Report]

Daejeon Hanbat Stadium, Daejeon

21 September 1988

Zambia	4–0	Guatemala
Makinka 53', 85'; K. Bwalya 79', 82'	[Report]

Gwangju Mudeung Stadium, Gwangju

== Gymnastics ==
=== Artistic ===
Women

Athlete	Event	Qualification					
Athlete	Event	Apparatus				Total	Rank
Athlete	Event	V	UB	BB	F	Total	Rank
María Flores-Wurmser	Individual	19.050	18.650	18.800	18.825	75.325	76

== Shooting ==
Men

Athlete	Event	Qualification		Final	
Athlete	Event	Points	Rank	Points	Rank
Carlos Silva	50 m running target	569	23	Did not advance	

== Swimming ==
Women

Athlete	Event	Heats		Final A/B	
Athlete	Event	Time	Rank	Time	Rank
Blanca Morales	100 m butterfly	1:05.02	28	Did not advance	
Blanca Morales	200 m butterfly	2:19.28	21	Did not advance	

== Wrestling ==
Greco-Roman

Athlete	Event	Group Stage								Final	
Athlete	Event	Opposition Result	Opposition Result	Opposition Result	Opposition Result	Opposition Result	Opposition Result	Opposition Result	Rank	Opposition Result	Rank
Edvin-Eduardo Vásquez	52 kg	Jankovics (TCH); L fall	Robert (FRA); L 0–15	Did not advance					9	Did not advance	

Freestyle

Athlete	Event	Group Stage								Final	
Athlete	Event	Opposition Result	Opposition Result	Opposition Result	Opposition Result	Opposition Result	Opposition Result	Opposition Result	Rank	Opposition Result	Rank
Edvin-Eduardo Vásquez	52 kg	Olvera (MEX); L fall	Bourdin (FRA); L 0–16	Did not advance					10	Did not advance	
