= Guatemala at the Olympics =

- IOC code: GUA
- NOC: Guatemalan Olympic Committee
- Website: www.cog.org.gt (in Spanish)
- Medals Ranked 110th: Gold 1 Silver 1 Bronze 1 Total 3

Summer appearances
- 1952; 1956–1964; 1968; 1972; 1976; 1980; 1984; 1988; 1992; 1996; 2000; 2004; 2008; 2012; 2016; 2020; 2024; 2028

Winter appearances
- 1988; 1992–2026

Guatemala first participated at the Olympic Games in 1952, but then missed the next three Olympiads. Guatemala has sent athletes to compete in every Summer Olympic Games since 1968. The nation has participated once in the 1988 Winter Olympic Games and as for 2026 it's the only time participating.

Guatemala won its first Olympic medal sixty years after its first Olympic appearance, during the 2012 Summer Olympics, when Erick Barrondo took second place in the men's 20 km walk.

The second medal was won in Paris 2024 when Jean Pierre Brol won third place in men's trap shooting.

Their third medal and first ever gold medal was won by Adriana Ruano Oliva in women’s trap shooting at Paris 2024. She also set a new Olympic record by shooting 45/50 in the final.

The National Olympic Committee (NOC) for Guatemala was created in 1947 and recognized by the International Olympic Committee (IOC) that same year.

In mid-2023, Guatemala was initially suspended by the IOC due to a 'domestic legal dispute', meaning its athletes would not be invited to compete under their own flag for the 2024 Summer Olympics. On March 19, 2024, the IOC EB provisionally lifted the suspension of Guatemala's NOC.

== Medal tables ==
=== Medals by Summer Games ===
| Games | Athletes | Gold | Silver | Bronze | Total | Rank |
| (Finland) 1952 Helsinki | 21 | 0 | 0 | 0 | 0 | – |
| (Australia) 1956 Melbourne | did not participate | | | | | |
| (Italy) 1960 Rome | did not participate | | | | | |
| (Japan) 1964 Tokyo | did not participate | | | | | |
| 1968 Mexico City | 48 | 0 | 0 | 0 | 0 | – |
| (West Germany) 1972 Munich | 8 | 0 | 0 | 0 | 0 | – |
| (Canada) 1976 Montreal | 29 | 0 | 0 | 0 | 0 | – |
| (Soviet Union) 1980 Moscow | 11 | 0 | 0 | 0 | 0 | – |
| (United States) 1984 Los Angeles | 24 | 0 | 0 | 0 | 0 | – |
| (South Korea) 1988 Seoul | 30 | 0 | 0 | 0 | 0 | – |
| (Spain) 1992 Barcelona | 14 | 0 | 0 | 0 | 0 | – |
| (United States) 1996 Atlanta | 26 | 0 | 0 | 0 | 0 | – |
| (Australia) 2000 Sydney | 15 | 0 | 0 | 0 | 0 | – |
| (Greece) 2004 Athens | 18 | 0 | 0 | 0 | 0 | – |
| (China) 2008 Beijing | 12 | 0 | 0 | 0 | 0 | – |
| (United Kingdom) 2012 London | 19 | 0 | 1 | 0 | 1 | 69 |
| (Brazil) 2016 Rio de Janeiro | 21 | 0 | 0 | 0 | 0 | – |
| (Japan) 2020 Tokyo | 24 | 0 | 0 | 0 | 0 | – |
| (France) 2024 Paris | 16 | 1 | 0 | 1 | 2 | 60 |
| (United States) 2028 Los Angeles | future event | | | | | |
| (Australia) 2032 Brisbane | future event | | | | | |
| Total | | 1 | 1 | 1 | 3 | 110 |

=== Medals by Winter Games ===
| Games | Athletes | Gold | Silver | Bronze | Total | Rank |
| (Canada) 1988 Calgary | 6 | 0 | 0 | 0 | 0 | – |
| 1992–2026 | did not participate | | | | | |
| (France) 2030 French Alps | future event | | | | | |
| (United States) 2034 Utah | future event | | | | | |
| Total | | 0 | 0 | 0 | 0 | – |

=== Medals by summer sport ===
| Sport | Gold | Silver | Bronze | Total |
|---|---|---|---|---|
| Shooting | 1 | 0 | 1 | 2 |
| Athletics | 0 | 1 | 0 | 1 |
| Totals (2 entries) | 1 | 1 | 1 | 3 |

== List of medalists ==
| Medal | Name | Games | Sport | Event |
|---|---|---|---|---|
| Silver | Érick Barrondo | 2012 London | Athletics | Men's 20 km walk |
| Bronze | Jean Pierre Brol | 2024 Paris | Shooting | Men's trap |
| Gold | Adriana Ruano | 2024 Paris | Shooting | Women's trap |

== See also ==
- Category:Olympic competitors for Guatemala
- List of flag bearers for Guatemala at the Olympics
- Tropical nations at the Winter Olympics
- Guatemala at the Paralympics
