= Guatemala at the 2012 Summer Olympics =

- IOC code: GUA
- NOC: Guatemalan Olympic Committee
- Website: www.cog.org.gt (in Spanish)

in London
- Competitors: 19 in 11 sports
- Flag bearers: Juan Ignacio Maegli (opening); Erick Barrondo (closing)
- Medals Ranked 69th: Gold 0 Silver 1 Bronze 0 Total 1

Summer Olympics appearances (overview)
- 1952; 1956–1964; 1968; 1972; 1976; 1980; 1984; 1988; 1992; 1996; 2000; 2004; 2008; 2012; 2016; 2020; 2024

Guatemala competed at the 2012 Summer Olympics in London from 27 July to 12 August 2012. This was the nation's 14th appearance at the Summer Olympics, having missed three Olympics after its debut at the 1932 Summer Olympics in Los Angeles, California, United States.

The Guatemalan Olympic Committee sent the nation's largest delegation to the Games after the 1996 Summer Olympics in Atlanta, Georgia, United States. A total of 19 athletes, 12 men and seven women, competed in 11 sports and 21 distinct events.

Guatemala left London with its first ever Olympic medal won by Erick Barrondo, who won silver in the men's race walk event.

== Background ==
Guatemala made their Olympic debut at the 1932 Summer Olympics in Los Angeles, California, United States. They would compete again 20 years later at the 1952 Summer Olympics in Helsinki, Finland before competing regularly from the 1968 Summer Olympics in Mexico City, Mexico. The 2012 Summer Olympics in London, England, United Kingdom marked Guatemala's 14th appearance at a Summer Olympics and the 19 athletes present was their largest delegation since the 1996 Summer Olympics in Atlanta, Georgia, United States. Prior to 2012, they had never won an Olympic medal.

== Competitors ==
In total, 19 athletes represented Guatemala at the 2012 Summer Olympics in London, England, United Kingdom across 11 different sports.

Sport	Men	Women	Total
Athletics	3	3	6
Badminton	1	0	1
Cycling	1	0	1
Gymnastics	0	1	1
Judo	1	0	1
Modern pentathlon	1	0	1
Sailing	1	1	2
Shooting	2	0	2
Swimming	1	0	1
Taekwondo	0	1	1
Weightlifting	1	1	2
Total	12	7	19

== Medalists ==
Guatemala won one medal at the games after Erick Barrondo claimed silver in the men's 20 km race walk.

Medal	Name	Sport	Event	Date
Silver	Erick Barrondo	Athletics	Men's 20 km race walk	4 August

== Athletics ==
In total, six Guatemalan athletes participated in the athletics events – Erick Barrondo, Jamy Franco, José Amado García, Mayra Carolina Herrera, Mirna Ortiz and Jaime Quiyuch.

Men

Athlete	Event	Final	
Athlete	Event	Result	Rank
Erick Barrondo	20 km walk	1:18:57	2nd place, silver medalist(s)
Erick Barrondo	50 km walk	DSQ	
José Amado García	Marathon	2:18:23	38
Jaime Quiyuch	50 km walk	DSQ	

Women

Athlete	Event	Final	
Athlete	Event	Result	Rank
Jamy Franco	20 km walk	1:33:18	31
Mayra Carolina Herrera	20 km walk	1:35:33	46
Mirna Ortiz	20 km walk	DSQ	

== Badminton ==
In total, one Guatemalan athlete participated in the badminton events – Kevin Cordón in the men's singles.

Athlete	Event	Group Stage			Elimination	Quarterfinal	Semifinal	Final / BM	
Athlete	Event	Opposition Score	Opposition Score	Rank	Opposition Score	Opposition Score	Opposition Score	Opposition Score	Rank
Kevin Cordón	Men's singles	Hurskainen (SWE); W 15–21, 21–12, 21–14	Ouseph (GBR); W 12–21, 21–17, 21–19	1 Q	Sasaki (JPN); L 21–23, 10–21	Did not advance			

== Cycling ==
In total, one Guatemalan athlete participated in the cycling events – Manuel Rodas in the men's road race.

Athlete	Event	Time	Rank
Manuel Rodas	Men's road race	Did not finish	

== Gymnastics ==
In total, one Guatemalan athlete participated in the gymnastics events – Ana Sofía Gómez in the women's artistic individual all-around.

Athlete	Event	Qualification						Final					
Athlete	Event	Apparatus				Total	Rank	Apparatus				Total	Rank
Athlete	Event	F	V	UB	BB	Total	Rank	F	V	UB	BB	Total	Rank
Ana Sofía Gómez	All-around	14.000	14.533	13.266	14.333	56.132	16 Q	13.400	14.633	13.733	13.133	54.899	22

== Judo ==
In total, one Guatemalan athlete participated in the judo events – Darrel Castillo in the men's +100 kg category.

Athlete	Event	Round of 32	Round of 16	Quarterfinals	Semifinals	Repechage	Final / BM	
Athlete	Event	Opposition Result	Opposition Result	Opposition Result	Opposition Result	Opposition Result	Opposition Result	Rank
Darrel Castillo	Men's +100 kg	Kamikawa (JPN); L 0000–0100	Did not advance					

== Modern pentathlon ==
In total, one Guatemalan athlete participated in the modern pentathlon events – Andrei Gheorghe in the men's competition.

Athlete	Event	Fencing (épée one touch)			Swimming (200 m freestyle)			Riding (show jumping)			Combined: shooting/running (10 m air pistol)/(3000 m)			Total points	Final rank
Athlete	Event	Results	Rank	MP points	Time	Rank	MP points	Penalties	Rank	MP points	Time	Rank	MP Points	Total points	Final rank
Andrei Gheorghe	Men's	15–20	=25	760	2:13.89	35	1196	88	22	1112	11:15.58	27	2300	5368	31

== Sailing ==
In total, two Guatemalan athletes participated in the sailing events – Andrea Aldana in the women's laser radial and Juan Ignacio Maegli in the men's laser.

Men

Athlete	Event	Race											Net points	Final rank
Athlete	Event	1	2	3	4	5	6	7	8	9	10	M*	Net points	Final rank
Juan Ignacio Maegli	Laser	1	10	7	13	5	20	7	10	21	~~21~~	7	108	9

Women

Athlete	Event	Race											Net points	Final rank
Athlete	Event	1	2	3	4	5	6	7	8	9	10	M*	Net points	Final rank
Andrea Aldana	Laser Radial	24	36	34	~~39~~	38	8	24	33	29	31	EL	257	32

== Shooting ==
In total, two Guatemalan athletes participated in the shooting events – Jean Pierre Brol in the men's trap and Sergio Sánchez in the men's 10 m air pistol and the men's 50 m pistol.

Athlete	Event	Qualification		Final	
Athlete	Event	Points	Rank	Points	Rank
Jean Pierre Brol	Trap	116	28	Did not advance	
Sergio Sánchez	10 m air pistol	565	42	Did not advance	
Sergio Sánchez	50 m pistol	533	36	Did not advance	

== Swimming ==
In total, one Guatemalan athlete participated in the swimming events – Kevin Ávila in the men's 100 m freestyle.

Athlete	Event	Heat		Semifinal		Final	
Athlete	Event	Time	Rank	Time	Rank	Time	Rank
Kevin Ávila	100 m freestyle	51.44	38	Did not advance			

== Taekwondo ==
In total, one Guatemalan athlete participated in the taekwondo events – Elizabeth Zamora in the women's −49 kg category.

Athlete	Event	Round of 16	Quarterfinals	Semifinals	Repechage	Bronze Medal	Final	
Athlete	Event	Opposition Result	Opposition Result	Opposition Result	Opposition Result	Opposition Result	Opposition Result	Rank
Elizabeth Zamora	Women's −49 kg	Wu Jy (CHN); L 2–10	Did not advance		Kasahara (JPN); W 6–2	Sonkham (THA); L 0–8	Did not advance	5

== Weightlifting ==
In total, two Guatemalan athletes participated in the weightlifting events – Astrid Camposeco in the women's +75 kg category and Christian López in the men's +105 kg category.

Athlete	Event	Snatch		Clean & Jerk		Total	Rank
Athlete	Event	Result	Rank	Result	Rank	Total	Rank
Christian López	Men's +105 kg	172	16	215	14	387	15
Astrid Camposeco	Women's +75 kg	93	12	115	11	208	11

== See also ==
- Guatemala at the 2011 Pan American Games
