= Guatemala at the 2024 Summer Olympics =

- IOC code: GUA
- NOC: Guatemalan Olympic Committee
- Website: www.cog.org.gt (in Spanish)

in Paris, France 26 July 2024 – 11 August 2024
- Competitors: 16 in 7 sports
- Flag bearers (opening): Kevin Cordón & Waleska Soto
- Flag bearers (closing): Alberto González Mindez & Adriana Ruano Oliva
- Medals Ranked 60th: Gold 1 Silver 0 Bronze 1 Total 2

Summer Olympics appearances (overview)
- 1952; 1956–1964; 1968; 1972; 1976; 1980; 1984; 1988; 1992; 1996; 2000; 2004; 2008; 2012; 2016; 2020; 2024

Guatemala competed at the 2024 Summer Olympics in Paris from 26 July to 11 August 2024. The nation made its official debut in Helsinki 1952, and Guatemalan athletes have appeared in every edition of the Summer Olympics from 1968 onwards.

Kevin Cordón and Waleska Soto were the country's flagbearers during the opening ceremony.

In the men's trap event, sports shooter Jean Pierre Brol won the bronze medal, the second olympic medal ever for Guatemala in an Olympic Games.

In the women's trap event, sports shooter Adriana Ruano won the first-ever gold medal for Guatemala.

== Medalists ==
Medal	Name	Sport	Event	Date
Gold	Adriana Ruano	Shooting	Women's trap	31 July
Bronze	Jean Pierre Brol	Shooting	Men's trap	30 July

== Competitors ==
The following is the list of number of competitors in the Games.

Sport	Men	Women	Total
Athletics	4	1	5
Badminton	1	0	1
Judo	0	1	1
Modern pentathlon	1	1	2
Sailing	1	0	1
Shooting	2	2	4
Swimming	1	1	2
Total	10	6	16

== Athletics ==
Guatemalan track and field athletes achieved the entry standards for Paris 2024, either by passing the direct qualifying mark (or time for track and road races) or by world ranking in the following events (a maximum of 3 athletes each):

Key

- Note–Ranks given for track events are within the athlete's heat only
- Q = Qualified for the next round
- q = Qualified for the next round as a fastest loser or, in field events, by position without achieving the qualifying target
- NR = National record
- N/A = Round not applicable for the event
- Bye = Athlete not required to compete in round

Track & road events

Athlete	Event	Preliminary		Heat		Semifinal		Final	
Athlete	Event	Result	Rank	Result	Rank	Result	Rank	Result	Rank
Luis Grijalva	Men's 5000 m	13:58.81	16	—N/a				Did not advance	
Alberto González Mindez	Men's marathon	—N/a						2:22:12 SB	66
José Alejandro Barrondo	Men's 20 km walk	—N/a						1:24:17	38
Érick Barrondo	Men's 20 km walk	—N/a						1:26:19	43
Mariandrée Chacón	Women's 100 m	11.90	3 Q	12.06	9	Did Not Advance			

== Badminton ==
Guatemala entered one badminton player into the Olympic tournament based on the BWF Race to Paris Rankings.

Athlete	Event	Group stage				Elimination	Quarter-final	Semi-final	Final / BM	
Athlete	Event	Opposition Score	Opposition Score	Opposition Score	Rank	Opposition Score	Opposition Score	Opposition Score	Opposition Score	Rank
Kevin Cordón	Men's singles	Sen (IND); L 0–2	Christie (INA); L WO	Carraggi (BEL); L WO	Did not advance					

== Judo ==
Guatemala qualified one judoka for the following weight class at the Games. Jacqueline Solis (women's extra-lightweight, 48 kg) qualified via continental quota based on Olympic point rankings.

Athlete	Event	Round of 32	Round of 16	Quarterfinals	Semifinals	Repechage	Final / BM	
Athlete	Event	Opposition Result	Opposition Result	Opposition Result	Opposition Result	Opposition Result	Opposition Result	Rank
Jacqueline Solís	Women's –48 kg	Whitebooi (RSA); L 01–10	Did not advance					

== Modern pentathlon ==
Guatemalan modern pentathletes confirmed two quota places for Paris 2024. Andres Fernandez and Sophia Hernández secured one of five available spots in their respective event at the 2023 Pan American Games in Santiago, Chile.

Athlete	Event		Fencing (épée one touch)				Riding (show jumping)			Swimming (200 m freestyle)			Combined: shooting/running (10 m laser pistol)/(3000 m)			Total points	Final rank
Athlete	Event		RR	BR	Rank	MP points	Penalties	Rank	MP points	Time	Rank	MP points	Time	Rank	MP points	Total points	Final rank
Andrés Fernández	Men's	Semifinal	15–20	0	14	200	14	13	286	1:59.23	2	312	10:36.88	14	664	1462	13
Andrés Fernández	Men's	Final	15–20	Did not advance													
Sophia Hernández	Women's	Semifinal	15–20	2	13	202	7	11	293	2:22.83	16	265	12:45.04	16	535	1295	16
Sophia Hernández	Women's	Final	15–20	Did not advance													

== Sailing ==
Guatemalan sailors qualified one boat in the following classes through the 2024 ILCA 7 World Championships in Adelaide, Australia.

Medal race events

Athlete	Event	Race											Net points	Final rank
Athlete	Event	1	2	3	4	5	6	7	8	9	10	M*	Net points	Final rank
Juan Ignacio Maegli	Men's ILCA 7	21	22	8	3	9	33	~~44~~	15	Cancelled		EL	111	16

M = Medal race; EL = Eliminated – did not advance into the medal race

== Shooting ==
Guatemalan shooters achieved quota places for the following events based on their results at the 2022 and 2023 ISSF World Championships, 2022 and 2024 Championships of the Americas, 2023 Pan American Games, and 2024 ISSF World Olympic Qualification Tournament.

Athlete	Event	Qualification		Final	
Athlete	Event	Points	Rank	Points	Rank
Jean Pierre Brol	Men's trap	122	5 Q	35	3rd place, bronze medalist(s)
Sebastián Bermúdez	Men's skeet	117	21	Did not advance	
Adriana Ruano	Women's Trap	122	3 Q	45 OR	1st place, gold medalist(s)
Waleska Soto	Women's Trap	115	19	Did not advance	

== Swimming ==
Guatemala sent two swimmers to compete at the 2024 Paris Olympics.

Athlete	Event	Heat		Semifinal		Final	
Athlete	Event	Time	Rank	Time	Rank	Time	Rank
Erick Gordillo	Men's 200 m medley	2:02.24	18	Did not advance			
Lucero Mejía	Women's 100 m backstroke	1:03.42	28	Did not advance			

== See also ==
- Independent Athletes Team at the 2023 Pan American Games
