= Guatemala at the 2016 Summer Olympics =

- IOC code: GUA
- NOC: Guatemalan Olympic Committee
- Website: www.cog.org.gt (in Spanish)

in Rio de Janeiro
- Competitors: 21 in 10 sports
- Flag bearer: Ana Sofía Gómez
- Medals: Gold 0 Silver 0 Bronze 0 Total 0

Summer Olympics appearances (overview)
- 1952; 1956–1964; 1968; 1972; 1976; 1980; 1984; 1988; 1992; 1996; 2000; 2004; 2008; 2012; 2016; 2020; 2024

Guatemala competed at the 2016 Summer Olympics in Rio de Janeiro, Brazil, from 5 to 21 August 2016. This was the nation's fourteenth appearance at the Summer Olympics since its debut in 1952, despite failing to register any athletes in three other editions (1956 to 1964).

Guatemalan Olympic Committee (Spanish: Comité Olímpico Guatemalteco) confirmed a team of 21 athletes, 15 men and 6 women, to compete in 10 sports. It was the nation's largest delegation sent to the Olympics since 1996, surpassing the record of 19 athletes set in London 2012.

Among the Guatemalan athletes, two of them returned for their third consecutive appearance in Rio de Janeiro: badminton player Kevin Cordón and Laser sailor Juan Ignacio Maegli. Other notable athletes also featured siblings Enrique and Hebert Brol in double trap shooting, long-distance freestyle swimmer Valerie Gruest, the youngest of the team (aged 17), and race walker Erick Barrondo, who emerged as the nation's first Olympic medalist in 2012. The most successful athlete of the Games, Barrondo was originally selected to carry the Guatemalan flag, but decided to focus on his training instead for the competition. Artistic gymnast and Youth Olympian Ana Sofía Gómez took Barrondo's spot at the last minute to lead the team in the opening ceremony, the second female in history since swimmer Gisela Morales did so in 2004.

Unlike the previous Games, Guatemala left Rio de Janeiro without a single Olympic medal. Among the Guatemalans competing at these Games, only Maegli improved upon his ninth-place feat from London 2012 to produce the best result for the team, finishing eighth in Laser sailing.

== Athletics (track and field) ==
Guatemalan athletes have so far achieved qualifying standards in the following athletics events (up to a maximum of 3 athletes in each event):

Key

- Note–Ranks given for track events are within the athlete's heat only
- Q = Qualified for the next round
- q = Qualified for the next round as a fastest loser or, in field events, by position without achieving the qualifying target
- NR = National record
- N/A = Round not applicable for the event
- Bye = Athlete not required to compete in round

Track & road events
Men

Athlete	Event	Final	
Athlete	Event	Result	Rank
Erick Barrondo	20 km walk	1:27:01	50
Mario Bran	50 km walk	4:15:14	40
José Amado García	Marathon	2:30:11	118
Jaime Quiyuch	50 km walk	DSQ	
José María Raymundo	20 km walk	1:29:07	56
Juan Carlos Trujillo	Marathon	2:20:24	67

Women

Athlete	Event	Final	
Athlete	Event	Result	Rank
Mayra Carolina Herrera	20 km walk	DSQ	
Mirna Ortiz	20 km walk	1:35:11	30
Maritza Poncio	20 km walk	1:40:09	52

== Badminton ==
Guatemala has qualified one badminton player for the men's singles into the Olympic tournament. Remarkably going to his third Olympics, three-time Pan American Games champion Kevin Cordón had claimed his Olympic spot as one of top 34 individual shuttlers in the BWF World Rankings as of 5 May 2016.

Athlete	Event	Group Stage				Elimination	Quarterfinal	Semifinal	Final / BM	
Athlete	Event	Opposition Score	Opposition Score	Opposition Score	Rank	Opposition Score	Opposition Score	Opposition Score	Opposition Score	Rank
Kevin Cordón	Men's singles	Chen L (CHN); L WO	Dziółko (POL); L (21–18, 10–21, 13–21)	Karunaratne (SRI); L WO	4	Did not advance				

== Cycling ==
=== Road ===
Guatemala has qualified one rider in the men's Olympic road race by virtue of his top 20 individual ranking in the 2015 UCI America Tour.

Athlete	Event	Time	Rank
Manuel Rodas	Men's road race	Did not finish	

== Gymnastics ==
=== Artistic ===
Guatemala has entered one artistic gymnast into the Olympic competition. Ana Sofía Gómez claimed her Olympic spot in the women's apparatus and all-around events at the Olympic Test Event in Rio de Janeiro.

Women

Athlete	Event	Qualification						Final					
Athlete	Event	Apparatus				Total	Rank	Apparatus				Total	Rank
Athlete	Event	V	UB	BB	F	Total	Rank	V	UB	BB	F	Total	Rank
Ana Sofía Gómez	All-around	14.766	13.766	13.400	12.900	54.832	32	Did not advance					

== Judo ==
Guatemala has qualified one judoka for the men's extra-lightweight category (60 kg) at the Games. José Ramos earned a continental quota spot from the Pan American region as Guatemala's top-ranked judoka outside of direct qualifying position in the IJF World Ranking List of May 30, 2016.

Athlete	Event	Round of 64	Round of 32	Round of 16	Quarterfinals	Semifinals	Repechage	Final / BM	
Athlete	Event	Opposition Result	Opposition Result	Opposition Result	Opposition Result	Opposition Result	Opposition Result	Opposition Result	Rank
José Ramos	Men's −60 kg	Tsogtbaatar (MGL); L 000–100	Did not advance						

== Modern pentathlon ==
Guatemalan athletes have qualified for the following spots to compete in modern pentathlon. Charles Fernández and Isabel Brand secured a selection each in the men's and women's event respectively after obtaining one of the five Olympic slots from the Pan American Games.

Athlete	Event	Fencing (épée one touch)				Swimming (200 m freestyle)			Riding (show jumping)			Combined: shooting/running (10 m air pistol)/(3200 m)			Total points	Final rank
Athlete	Event	RR	BR	Rank	MP points	Time	Rank	MP points	Penalties	Rank	MP points	Time	Rank	MP Points	Total points	Final rank
Charles Fernández	Men's	19–16	0	16	214	2:03.18	14	331	29	27	271	11:21.49	11	619	1435	15
Isabel Brand	Women's	14–21	0	31	184	2:22.57	34	273	7	8	293	12:54.11	13	526	1276	21

== Sailing ==
Guatemalan sailors have qualified one boat in the men's Laser class by claiming an Olympic berth at the 2014 ISAF Sailing World Championships.

Athlete	Event	Race											Net points	Final rank
Athlete	Event	1	2	3	4	5	6	7	8	9	10	M*	Net points	Final rank
Juan Ignacio Maegli	Men's Laser	18	14	3	7	16	~~25~~	18	17	3	7	14	117	8

M = Medal race; EL = Eliminated – did not advance into the medal race

== Shooting ==
Guatemalan shooters have achieved quota places for the following events as a result of their best finish at the 2015 ISSF World Cup series and at the 2015 Pan American Games, as long as they obtained a minimum qualifying score (MQS) by March 31, 2016.

Athlete	Event	Qualification		Semifinal		Final	
Athlete	Event	Points	Rank	Points	Rank	Points	Rank
Enrique Brol	Men's double trap	133	10	Did not advance			
Hebert Brol	Men's double trap	116	20	Did not advance			

Qualification Legend: Q = Qualify for the next round; q = Qualify for the bronze medal (shotgun)

== Swimming ==
Guatemalan swimmers have so far achieved qualifying standards in the following events (up to a maximum of 2 swimmers in each event at the Olympic Qualifying Time (OQT), and potentially 1 at the Olympic Selection Time (OST)):

Athlete	Event	Heat		Semifinal		Final	
Athlete	Event	Time	Rank	Time	Rank	Time	Rank
Luis Martínez	Men's 100 m butterfly	52.22	19	Did not advance			
Valerie Gruest	Women's 400 m freestyle	4:19.58	29	—N/a		Did not advance	
Valerie Gruest	Women's 800 m freestyle	8:39.80	22	—N/a		Did not advance	

== Weightlifting ==
Guatemala has received an unused quota place from IWF to send a male weightlifter to the Olympics.

Athlete	Event	Snatch		Clean & Jerk		Total	Rank
Athlete	Event	Result	Rank	Result	Rank	Total	Rank
Edgar Pineda	Men's −56 kg	108	15	143	10	251	10

== See also ==
- Guatemala at the 2015 Pan American Games
