= Shooting at the 2024 Summer Olympics – Women's trap =

Women's trap at the Games of the XXXIII Olympiad
- Venue: Chateauroux Shooting Centre
- Dates: 30–31 July 2024
- Competitors: 30 from 20 nations

Medalists
1st place, gold medalist(s)		Adriana Ruano	Guatemala
2nd place, silver medalist(s)		Silvana Stanco	Italy
3rd place, bronze medalist(s)		Penny Smith	Australia

The Women's trap event at the 2024 Summer Olympics took place on 30 and 31 July 2024 at the Chateauroux Shooting Centre.

Adriana Ruano won the event, which became the first ever gold Olympic medal for Guatemala. Silvana Stanco became the silver medalist, and Penny Smith won the bronze. For all the medalists, these were their first Olympic medals. The defending champion, Zuzana Rehák-Štefečeková, participated but did not qualify for the final.

== Records ==
Prior to this competition, the existing world and Olympic records were as follows:

Qualification records
World record	Zuzana Rehák-Štefečeková (SVK)	125	Tokyo, Japan	28 July 2021
Olympic record	Zuzana Rehák-Štefečeková (SVK)	125	Tokyo, Japan	28 July 2021

Final records
World record	Ashley Carroll (USA)	48	Guadalajara, Mexico	5 March 2018
Olympic record	Zuzana Rehák-Štefečeková (SVK)	43	Tokyo, Japan	29 July 2021

== Schedule ==
All times are Central European Summer Time (UTC+2)

Date	Time	Round
Tuesday, 30 July 2024; Wednesday, 31 July 2024	9:00; 9:00	Qualification
Wednesday, 31 July 2024	15:30	Final

== Results ==
=== Qualification ===
Rank	Athlete	Country	1	2	3	4	5	Total	Notes
1	Mar Molné Magriña	Spain	25	25	25	24	24	123	Q
2	Fátima Gálvez	Spain	24	25	25	25	23	122+9	Q
3	Adriana Ruano	Guatemala	25	24	24	24	25	122+8	Q
4	Silvana Stanco	Italy	25	25	23	24	25	122+0+1	Q
5	Wu Cuicui	China	24	23	25	25	25	122+0+0	Q
6	Penny Smith	Australia	23	25	25	23	25	121+2	Q
7	Zhang Xinqiu	China	24	25	23	25	24	121+1	
8	Maria Ines Coelho De Barros	Portugal	24	24	24	24	25	121+0	
9	Jessica Rossi	Italy	24	25	23	23	25	120	
10	Mariya Dmitriyenko	Kazakhstan	24	24	25	22	25	120	
11	Kathrin Murche	Germany	22	25	23	25	24	119	
12	Zuzana Rehák-Štefečeková	Slovakia	23	24	21	24	25	117	
13	Rümeysa Pelin Kaya	Turkey	22	25	22	23	25	117	
14	Lucy Hall	Great Britain	25	21	24	23	24	117	
15	Alessandra Perilli	San Marino	23	23	23	23	24	116	
16	Ryann Paige Phillips	United States	24	24	23	21	24	116	
17	Catherine Skinner	Australia	22	23	24	24	23	116	
18	Rachel Tozier	United States	22	24	25	22	23	115	
19	Ana Waleska Soto Abril	Guatemala	21	24	23	25	22	115	
20	Kang Gee-eun	South Korea	22	21	24	23	24	114	
21	Ray Bassil	Lebanon	23	25	23	23	20	114	
22	Rajeshwari Kumari	India	22	21	25	22	23	113	
23	Shreyasi Singh	India	22	22	24	22	23	113	
24	Lee Bo-na	South Korea	23	23	23	24	20	113	
25	Liu Wan-yu	Chinese Taipei	21	25	25	21	20	112	
26	Lin Yi-chun	Chinese Taipei	25	21	19	21	24	110	
27	Maggy Ashmawy	Egypt	23	21	22	21	23	110	
28	Carole Cormenier	France	19	24	24	21	22	110	
29	Melanie Couzy	France	19	23	22	22	23	109	
30	Noora Antikainen	Finland	17	23	22	22	23	107	

=== Final ===
Rank	Athlete	Series						Notes
Rank	Athlete	1	2	3	4	5	6	Notes
1st place, gold medalist(s)	Adriana Ruano (GUA)	23	28	32	37	42	45	OR
2nd place, silver medalist(s)	Silvana Stanco (ITA)	20	25	29	33	37	40	
3rd place, bronze medalist(s)	Penny Smith (AUS)	20	25	29	32			
4	Mar Molné Magriña (ESP)	21	23	27				
5	Fátima Gálvez (ESP)	18	23					
6	Wu Cuicui (CHN)	17						
