= Guatemala at the 1980 Summer Olympics =

- IOC code: GUA
- NOC: Guatemalan Olympic Committee

in Moscow
- Competitors: 11 in 5 sports
- Flag bearer: Carlos Silva
- Medals: Gold 0 Silver 0 Bronze 0 Total 0

Summer Olympics appearances (overview)
- 1952; 1956–1964; 1968; 1972; 1976; 1980; 1984; 1988; 1992; 1996; 2000; 2004; 2008; 2012; 2016; 2020; 2024

Guatemala competed at the 1980 Summer Olympics in Moscow, USSR.
