= Guatemala at the 2004 Summer Olympics =

- IOC code: GUA
- NOC: Guatemalan Olympic Committee
- Website: www.cog.org.gt (in Spanish)

in Athens
- Competitors: 18 in 8 sports
- Flag bearer: Gisela Morales
- Medals: Gold 0 Silver 0 Bronze 0 Total 0

Summer Olympics appearances (overview)
- 1952; 1956–1964; 1968; 1972; 1976; 1980; 1984; 1988; 1992; 1996; 2000; 2004; 2008; 2012; 2016; 2020; 2024

Guatemala competed at the 2004 Summer Olympics in Athens, Greece, from 13 to 29 August 2004. This was the nation's eleventh appearance at the Summer Olympics, excluding three occasions after its national debut at the 1952 Summer Olympics in Helsinki.

== Athletics ==
Guatemalan athletes have so far achieved qualifying standards in the following athletics events (up to a maximum of 3 athletes in each event at the 'A' Standard, and 1 at the 'B' Standard).

Key

- Note–Ranks given for track events are within the athlete's heat only
- Q = Qualified for the next round
- q = Qualified for the next round as a fastest loser or, in field events, by position without achieving the qualifying target
- NR = National record
- N/A = Round not applicable for the event
- Bye = Athlete not required to compete in round

Men

Athlete	Event	Final	
Athlete	Event	Result	Rank
Alfredo Arevalo	Marathon	2:34:02	77
José Amado García	Marathon	2:27:13	64
Luis Fernando García	50 km walk	DNF	
Julio René Martínez	50 km walk	DSQ	

Women

Athlete	Event	Final	
Athlete	Event	Result	Rank
Teresita Collado	20 km walk	1:46:41	49

== Badminton ==
Guatemala has qualified a badminton player in the men's singles.

Athlete	Event	Round of 32	Round of 16	Quarterfinal	Semifinal	Final / BM	
Athlete	Event	Opposition Score	Opposition Score	Opposition Score	Opposition Score	Opposition Score	Rank
Pedro Yang	Men's singles	Andersen (NOR); L 9–15, 15–8, 13–15	Did not advance				

== Cycling ==
=== Road ===
Men

Athlete	Event	Time	Rank
Maria Dolores Molina	Women's road race	3:40:43	50

=== Track ===
Keirin

Athlete	Event	1st round	Repechage	2nd round	Final
Athlete	Event	Rank	Rank	Rank	Rank
Jose Sochon	Men's keirin	4 R	3	Did not advance	

== Modern pentathlon ==
Guatemala has qualified a single athlete in modern pentathlon.

Athlete	Event	Shooting (10 m air pistol)			Fencing (épée one touch)			Swimming (200 m freestyle)			Riding (show jumping)			Running (3000 m)			Total points	Final rank
Athlete	Event	Points	Rank	MP Points	Results	Rank	MP points	Time	Rank	MP points	Penalties	Rank	MP points	Time	Rank	MP Points	Total points	Final rank
María Isabel de Sanz-Agero	Women's	161	26	868	10–21	31	664	2:30.29	28	1120	172	24	1028	12:23.90	32	748	4428	31

== Shooting ==
Men

Athlete	Event	Qualification		Final	
Athlete	Event	Points	Rank	Points	Rank
Attila Solti	10 m running target	573	10	Did not advance	

== Swimming ==
Guatemalan swimmers earned qualifying standards in the following events (up to a maximum of 2 swimmers in each event at the A-standard time, and 1 at the B-standard time):

Men

Athlete	Event	Heat		Semifinal		Final	
Athlete	Event	Result	Rank	Result	Rank	Result	Rank
Rodrigo Díaz	50 m freestyle	23.69	53	Did not advance			
Alvaro Fortuny	100 m breaststroke	1:05.41	45	Did not advance			

Women

Athlete	Event	Heat		Semifinal		Final	
Athlete	Event	Result	Rank	Result	Rank	Result	Rank
Gisela Morales	100 m backstroke	1:03.72	27	Did not advance			
Gisela Morales	200 m backstroke	2:18.23	26	Did not advance			
Melanie Slowing	50 m freestyle	27.44	46	Did not advance			

== Taekwondo ==
Athlete	Event	Round of 16	Quarterfinals	Semifinals	Repechage 1	Repechage 2	Final / BM	
Athlete	Event	Opposition Result	Opposition Result	Opposition Result	Opposition Result	Opposition Result	Opposition Result	Rank
Gabriel Sagastume	Men's −68 kg	Mahlangu (RSA); W 11–7	Massimino (AUS); W 5–4	Huang C-H (TPE); L 5–7	Bye	Silva (BRA); L 10–12	Did not advance	5
Euda Carías	Women's −49 kg	Teo (MAS); W 4–4 SUP	Lukic (AUT); W 1–1 SUP	Labrada (CUB); L 3–8	Bye	Mora (COL); L 0–2	Did not advance	5
Heidy Juárez	Women's −67 kg	Bartasek (AUS); W 7–0	Mystakidou (GRE); L 4–6	Did not advance	Wihongi (NZL); W 4–1	Díaz (PUR); W 5–2	Hwang K-S (KOR); L 2–5	4

== Weightlifting ==
Athlete	Event	Snatch		Clean & Jerk		Total	Rank
Athlete	Event	Result	Rank	Result	Rank	Total	Rank
Joel Bran	Men's +105 kg	160	15	210	13	370	13

== See also ==
- Guatemala at the 2003 Pan American Games
- Guatemala at the 2004 Summer Paralympics
