= Guatemala at the 1972 Summer Olympics =

- IOC code: GUA
- NOC: Guatemalan Olympic Committee

in Munich
- Competitors: 8 in 3 sports
- Flag bearer: Víctor Castellanos
- Medals: Gold 0 Silver 0 Bronze 0 Total 0

Summer Olympics appearances (overview)
- 1952; 1956–1964; 1968; 1972; 1976; 1980; 1984; 1988; 1992; 1996; 2000; 2004; 2008; 2012; 2016; 2020; 2024

Guatemala competed at the 1972 Summer Olympics in Munich, West Germany. Eight competitors, all men, took part in ten events in three sports.

== Athletics ==
Men's 5000 metres

- Carlos Cuque López

- Heat – 15:53.4 (→ did not advance)

== Shooting ==
One male shooter represented Guatemala in 1972.

25 m pistol

- Víctor Castellanos
