= Guatemala at the 2000 Summer Olympics =

- IOC code: GUA
- NOC: Guatemalan Olympic Committee
- Website: www.cog.org.gt (in Spanish)

in Sydney
- Competitors: 15 (14 men and 1 woman) in 7 sports
- Flag bearer: Attila Solti
- Medals: Gold 0 Silver 0 Bronze 0 Total 0

Summer Olympics appearances (overview)
- 1952; 1956–1964; 1968; 1972; 1976; 1980; 1984; 1988; 1992; 1996; 2000; 2004; 2008; 2012; 2016; 2020; 2024

Guatemala competed at the 2000 Summer Olympics in Sydney, Australia.

== Competitors ==
The following is the list of number of competitors in the Games.

Sport	Men	Women	Total
Athletics	6	1	7
Cycling	1	0	1
Judo	1	0	1
Shooting	3	0	3
Swimming	1	0	1
Taekwondo	1	0	1
Weightlifting	1	0	1
Total	14	1	15

== Athletics ==
Key

- Note–Ranks given for track events are within the athlete's heat only
- Q = Qualified for the next round by position in race or, in field events, by achieving the automatic qualification target
- q = Qualified for the next round as a fastest loser or, in field events, by position without achieving the qualifying target

Men

Athlete	Event	Heat		Quarterfinal		Semifinal		Final	
Athlete	Event	Time	Rank	Time	Rank	Time	Rank	Time	Rank
Oscar Meneses	100 m	10.54	5	Did not advance					
Rolando Blanco; José Haroldo Meneses; Oscar Meneses; José Tinoco	4 × 100 m relay	39.34	2	—N/a		Did not advance			
Luis Fernando García	20 km race walk	—N/a						1:27:16	32
Julio René Martínez	20 km race walk	—N/a						1:31:47	43

Women

Athlete	Event	Heat		Quarterfinal		Semifinal		Final	
Athlete	Event	Time	Rank	Time	Rank	Time	Rank	Time	Rank
Teresita Collado	20 km race walk	—N/a						1:43:28	41

== Cycling ==
Athlete	Event	Time	Rank
Oscar Pineda Méndez	Men's Road race	5:52:47	91

== Judo ==
Athlete	Event	First round	Round of 32	Round of 16	Quarterfinal	Semifinal	Repechage 1	Repechage 2	Repechage 3	Repechage 4	Final / BM	
Athlete	Event	Opposition Result	Opposition Result	Opposition Result	Opposition Result	Opposition Result	Opposition Result	Opposition Result	Opposition Result	Opposition Result	Opposition Result	Rank
Jorge Quintanal	Men's –66 kg	Bye	Benboudaoud (FRA); L 0000–1000	Did not advance			Han (KOR); L 0001–1002	Did not advance				

== Shooting ==
Men

Athlete	Event	Qualification		Final		Total	
Athlete	Event	Points	Rank	Points	Rank	Points	Rank
Sergio Sánchez	10 m air pistol	565	34	Did not advance			
Sergio Sánchez	50 m pistol	557	16	Did not advance			
Attila Solti	10 m running target	572	10	Did not advance			
Juan Romero Arribas	Skeet	117	=35	Did not advance			

== Swimming ==
Athlete	Event	Heat		Semifinal		Final	
Athlete	Event	Time	Rank	Time	Rank	Time	Rank
Alvaro Fortuny	Men's 100 m breaststroke	01:04.35	38	Did not advance			
Alvaro Fortuny	Men's 200 m breaststroke	02:21.78	39	Did not advance			

== Taekwondo ==
Athlete	Event	Round of 16	Quarterfinals	Semifinals	Repechage Quarterfinals	Repechage Semifinals	Final / BM	
Athlete	Event	Opposition Result	Opposition Result	Opposition Result	Opposition Result	Opposition Result	Opposition Result	Rank
Gabriel Sagastume	Men's −68 kg	Cruz (PHI); L 1–4	Did not advance					

== Weightlifting ==
Athlete	Event	Snatch			Clean & Jerk			Total	Rank
Athlete	Event	1	2	3	1	2	3	Total	Rank
Luis Enrique Medrano	Men's 56 kg	115.0	~~117.5~~	~~117.5~~	137.5	140.0	142.5	257.5	12

== Sources ==
- Wallechinsky, David (2004). The Complete Book of the Summer Olympics (Athens 2004 Edition). Toronto, Canada. ISBN 1-894963-32-6.
- International Olympic Committee (2001). The Results. Retrieved 12 November 2005.
- Sydney Organising Committee for the Olympic Games (2001). Official Report of the XXVII Olympiad Volume 1: Preparing for the Games. Retrieved 20 November 2005.
- Sydney Organising Committee for the Olympic Games (2001). Official Report of the XXVII Olympiad Volume 2: Celebrating the Games. Retrieved 20 November 2005.
- Sydney Organising Committee for the Olympic Games (2001). The Results. Retrieved 20 November 2005.
- International Olympic Committee Web Site
