= Guatemala at the 1996 Summer Olympics =

- IOC code: GUA
- NOC: Guatemalan Olympic Committee
- Website: www.cog.org.gt (in Spanish)

in Atlanta
- Competitors: 26 (25 men, 1 woman) in 11 sports
- Flag bearer: Julio René Martínez
- Medals: Gold 0 Silver 0 Bronze 0 Total 0

Summer Olympics appearances (overview)
- 1952; 1956–1964; 1968; 1972; 1976; 1980; 1984; 1988; 1992; 1996; 2000; 2004; 2008; 2012; 2016; 2020; 2024

Guatemala competed at the 1996 Summer Olympics in Atlanta, United States. 26 competitors, 25 men and 1 woman, took part in 20 events in 11 sports.

== Competitors ==
The following is the list of number of competitors in the Games.

Sport	Men	Women	Total
Athletics	6	0	6
Badminton	1	0	1
Canoeing	1	0	1
Cycling	6	0	6
Fencing	0	1	1
Judo	2	0	2
Sailing	1	0	1
Shooting	4	0	4
Swimming	2	0	2
Weightlifting	1	–	1
Wrestling	1	–	11
Total	25	1	26

== Athletics ==
Key

- Note–Ranks given for track events are within the athlete's heat only
- Q = Qualified for the next round
- q = Qualified for the next round as a fastest loser or, in field events, by position without achieving the qualifying target

Men

Track & road events

Athlete	Event	Heat		Quarterfinal		Semifinal		Final	
Athlete	Event	Time	Rank	Time	Rank	Time	Rank	Time	Rank
Luis Martínez	Marathon	—N/a						2:29.55	82
Luis Fernando García	20 km walk	—N/a						1:28:28	43
Julio René Martínez	20 km walk	—N/a						DQ	
Roberto Oscal	20 km walk	—N/a						DQ	
Julio César Urías	50 km walk	—N/a						3:56:27	17
Hugo López	50 km walk	—N/a						DQ	

== Badminton ==
Athlete	Event	Round of 64	Round of 32	Round of 16	Quarterfinal	Semifinal	Final / BM	
Athlete	Event	Opposition Score	Opposition Score	Opposition Score	Opposition Score	Opposition Score	Opposition Score	Rank
Kenneth Erichsen	Men's singles	Olsson (SWE); L 12–15, 15–6, 15–17	did not advance					

== Canoeing ==
=== Slalom ===
Men

Athlete	Event	Run 1		Run 2		Best	
Athlete	Event	Time	Rank	Time	Rank	Time	Rank
Benjamin Kvanli	K-1	182.28		164.34		164.34	33

== Cycling ==
=== Road ===
Men

Athlete	Event	Time	Rank
Felipe López	Road race	DNF	
Omar Ochoa	Road race	DNF	
Márlon Paniagua	Road race	DNF	
Edvin Santos	Road race	DNF	
Anton Villatoro	Road race	DNF	
Anton Villatoro	Time trial	1:10:34	25

=== Track ===
Athlete	Event	Points	Rank
Sergio Godoy	Men's points race	0	20

== Fencing ==
One woman represented Guatemala in 1996.

Women

Athlete	Event	Round of 64	Round of 32	Round of 16	Quarterfinal	Semifinal	Final / BM	
Athlete	Event	Opposition Result	Opposition Result	Opposition Result	Opposition Result	Opposition Result	Opposition Result	Rank
Carmen Rodríguez	Individual foil	Ohayon (ISR); L 2–15	did not advance					40

== Judo ==
Men

Athlete	Event	Round of 64	Round of 32	Round of 16	Quarterfinal	Semifinal	Repechage 1	Repechage 2	Repechage 3	Final / BM	
Athlete	Event	Opposition Result	Opposition Result	Opposition Result	Opposition Result	Opposition Result	Opposition Result	Opposition Result	Opposition Result	Opposition Result	Rank
Juan González	–71 kg	Hajtos (HUN); L	did not advance								
Rodolfo Cano	–86 kg	Gill (CAN); L	did not advance								

== Sailing ==
Men

Athlete	Event	Race											Total	
Athlete	Event	1	2	3	4	5	6	7	8	9	10	11	Points	Rank
Cristian Ruata	Mistral	44	44	43	~~DSQ~~	41	43	38	~~45~~	43	—N/a		296	45

== Shooting ==
Men

Athlete	Event	Qualification		Final		Total	
Athlete	Event	Points	Rank	Points	Rank	Points	Rank
Sergio Sánchez	10 m air pistol	573	36	did not advance			
Sergio Sánchez	50 m pistol	563	8	94.1	5	657.1	8
Attila Solti	10 m running target	570	8	97.0	6	667.0	8
Juan Carlos Romero	Skeet	118	26	did not advance			
Francisco Romero Arribas	Skeet	113	45	did not advance			

== Swimming ==
Men

Athlete	Event	Heat		Final	
Athlete	Event	Time	Rank	Time	Rank
Juan Luis Bocanegra	100 m freestyle	54.05	58	did not advance	
Roberto Bonilla	200 m breaststroke	2:21.86	29	did not advance	

== Weightlifting ==
Athlete	Event	Snatch (kg)				Clean & Jerk (kg)				Total
Athlete	Event	1	2	3	Result	1	2	3	Result	Total
Luis Medrano	-54 kg	100.0	~~102.5~~	~~102.5~~	100.0	~~120.0~~	120.0	~~125.0~~	120.0	220.0

== Wrestling ==
Freestyle

Athlete	Event	Round 1	Round 2	Round 3	Semifinal	Repechage 1	Repechage 2	Repechage 3	Repechage 4	Bronze semifinal	Final / BM / Pl.	
Athlete	Event	Opposition Score	Opposition Score	Opposition Score	Opposition Score	Opposition Score	Opposition Score	Opposition Score	Opposition Score	Opposition Score	Opposition Score	Rank
Mynor Ramírez	–48 kg	Eiter (USA); L 0-12	did not advance			Jacob (NGR); L 0-3	did not advance					

== See also ==
- Guatemala at the 1995 Pan American Games
