= Rita Sanz-Agero =

Guatemalan modern pentathlete (born 1991)

Personal information
- Full name: Rita Isabel Sanz-Agero Luna
- Nationality: Guatemala
- Born: 8 November 1991 (age 34) Guatemala City, Guatemala
- Height: 1.70 m (5 ft 7 in)
- Weight: 52 kg (115 lb)

Sport
- Sport: Modern pentathlon

Rita Sanz-Agero (born November 8, 1991, in Guatemala City) is a female modern pentathlete from Guatemala. At age sixteen, Sanz-Agero became the youngest modern pentathlete to compete at the 2008 Summer Olympics in Beijing, where she finished thirty-fourth in the women's event, with a score of 4,844 points.

Sanz-Agero is also the daughter of María Isabel Sanz; the granddaughter of Rita de Luna; and the niece of Silvia de Luna, all of whom were Olympic athletes.
