= Darrel Castillo =

Guatemalan judoka

Personal information
- Born: 4 August 1992 (age 32); Livingston, Guatemala

Sport
- Sport: Judo

Darrel Castillo (born 4 August 1992) is a Guatemalan judoka. He competed at the 2012 Summer Olympics in the +100 kg event but lost to Daiki Kamikawa in the first round.
