= Víctor Lechuga =

Guatemalan cyclist

Personal information
- Born: 10 August 1966 (age 60)

Cycling career
- Sport: Cycling

Víctor Lechuga (born 10 August 1966) is a Guatemalan former cyclist. He competed in two events at the 1988 Summer Olympics.
