= Isabella Maegli =

Guatemalan sailor

Personal information
- Full name: Isabella Maegli Agüero
- Nationality: Guatemalan
- Born: 16 August 1989 (age 36)

Sport
- Sport: Sailing

Isabella Maegli Agüero (Note: In this Spanish name, the first or paternal surname is Maegli and the second or maternal family name is Agüero.) (born 16 August 1989) is a Guatemalan sailor. She competed in the Laser Radial event at the 2020 Summer Olympics and was flag bearer in the opening ceremony.

== Notes ==
Summer Olympics
| Preceded by Ana Sofía Gómez | Flagbearer for Guatemala; Tokyo 2020 with Juan Ignacio Maegli | Succeeded by Kevin Cordón; Waleska Soto |
