= Ana Sofía Gómez =

Guatemalan artistic gymnast

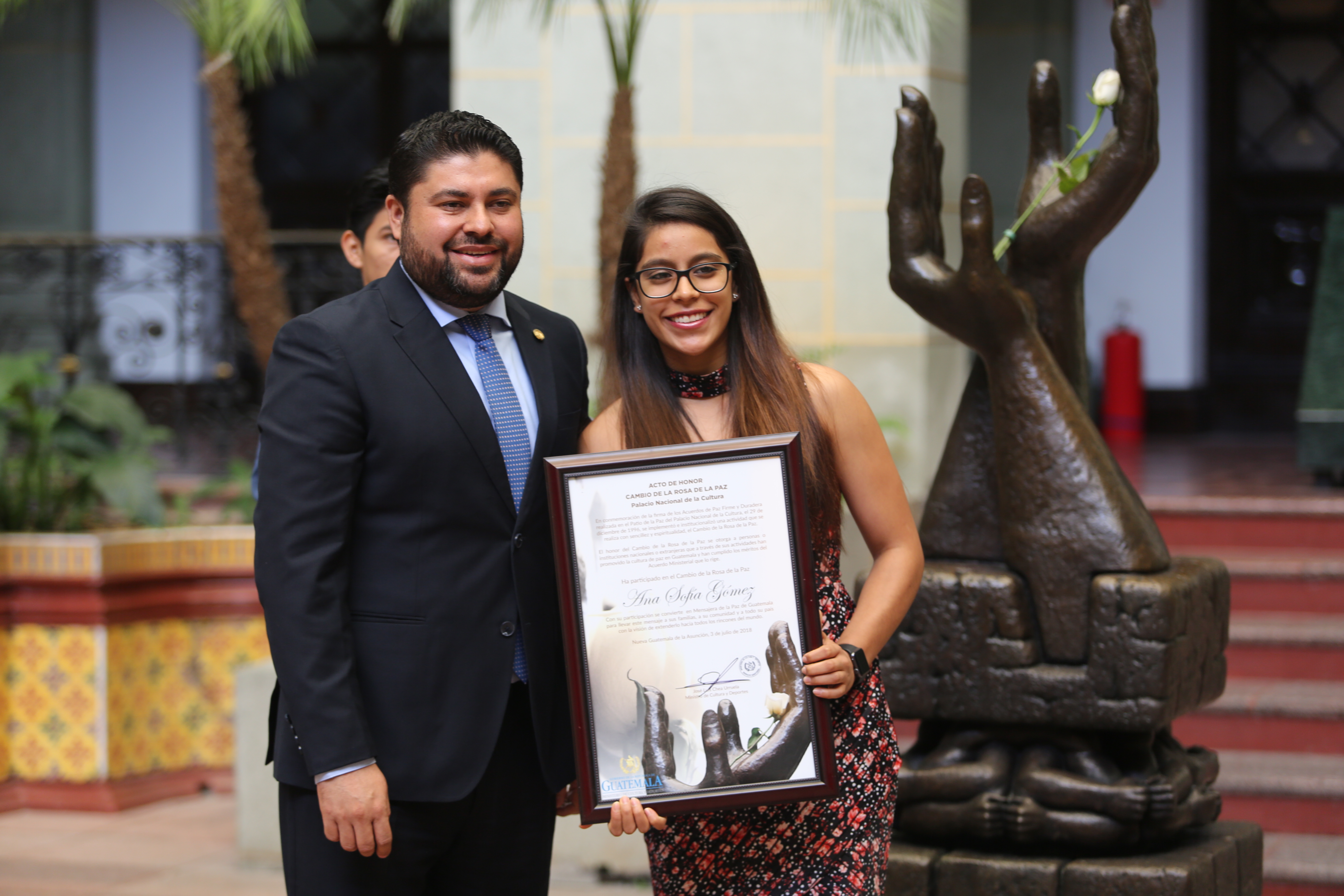
- Ana Sofía Gómez designated Peace Messenger in 2018.

Personal information
- Full name: Ana Sofía Gómez Porras
- Nickname: Sofi
- Born: 24 November 1995 (age 30) Guatemala City, Guatemala
- Height: 1.56 m (5 ft 1 1/2 in)

Gymnastics career
- Discipline: Women's artistic gymnastics
- Country represented: Guatemala
- Head coaches: Adrian Boboc; Elena Boboc
Medal record
Women's artistic gymnastics
Representing Guatemala
Pan American Games
Gold medal – first place	2011 Guadalajara	Balance beam
Silver medal – second place	2011 Guadalajara	All-around
Bronze medal – third place	2015 Toronto	Floor exercise
Pan American Championships
Gold medal – first place	2013 San Juan	Balance beam
Gold medal – first place	2014 Mississauga	Balance beam
Central American and Caribbean Games
Silver medal – second place	2014 Veracruz	Uneven bars

Ana Sofía Gómez Porras (born 24 November 1995) is a Guatemalan former artistic gymnast. She now works as a coach.

In 2007, at the 119th IOC Session, she gave IOC President Jacques Rogge the letter to say that Sochi had won the competition to host the 2014 Winter Olympics.

== Junior career ==
Gómez competed at the 2010 Summer Youth Olympics held in Singapore, where she was fifth in the all-around and fourth in the balance beam and floor finals. She was aided by an Olympic Solidarity scholarship.

== Senior career ==
Gómez won the silver medal in the all-around event and the gold medal in balance beam at the 2011 Pan American Games. She competed for Guatemala at the 2012 Summer Olympics. In the individual women's all-around at the 2012 London Olympics, she qualified into the event in 16th, eventually going on to finish 22nd.

She initially announced a decision to retire following the 2012 Olympics. However, in 2013, she competed in the World Cup in Ljubljana, Slovenia, and she placed fourth on the floor final with a score of 13.125.

In 2014, she went to Texas to improve her skills before she went to compete in Croatia. Although she qualified into the balance beam final in first place with a score of 13.900, in the final, she fell and received a 7.300 in execution and a 6.100 in difficulty, a total of 13.400, finishing in fourth place.

In July, she traveled to Canada one month before the Pan American Championships. On 30 August, she competed in the all-around and finished in 7th place with a final score of 54.100, and qualified for the balance beam finals with a score of 14.050. She had the highest D score of 6.300, and in her final exercise, she got 14.450, 8.250 in execution, and 6.200 in difficulty.

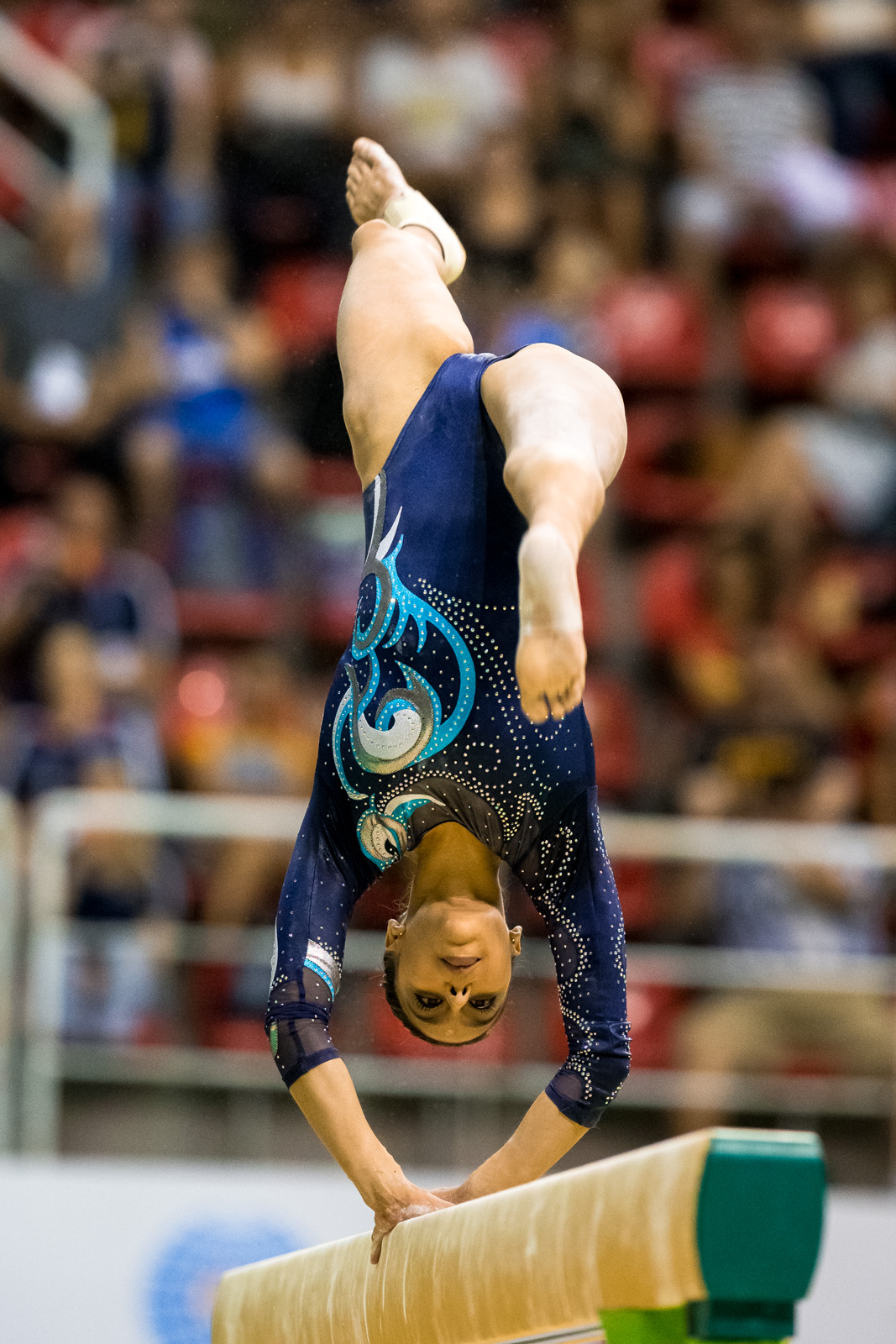
Gómez on balance beam at the 2016 Olympic Test Event

In October, she participated in the 2014 World Artistic Gymnastics Championships held in Nanning, China. She placed 43rd in the all-around qualification, but she made some mistakes and lost some points on the balance beam.

In 2015, she trained in Canada almost two months before the Pan American Games. She started on uneven bars, receiving a score of 14.250, 14.350 on balance beam, 14.000 on floor, and 14.600 on vault, so she qualified in third in the all-around final. However, in the final, she fell on the uneven bars and did not medal, but she qualified to 3 apparatus finals – uneven bars in 6th place, balance beam in 3rd, and floor in 6th. She fell off the balance beam in the final and finished in 7th place. On floor, she won a bronze medal with 14.150.

She competed for Guatemala at the 2016 Summer Olympics. However, she did not qualify for any of the event finals or the women's individual all-around final. She was the flagbearer for Guatemala during the Parade of Nations.

Gómez retired in January 2017.

Summer Olympics
Preceded by Juan Ignacio Maegli	Flagbearer for Guatemala; Rio de Janeiro 2016	Succeeded by Isabella Maegli; Juan Ignacio Maegli
