= Óscar Aquino =

Guatemalan cyclist

Personal information
- Born: 28 April 1966 (age 60)

Cycling career
- Sport: Cycling

Óscar Aquino (born 28 April 1966) is a Guatemalan former cyclist. He competed in two events at the 1988 Summer Olympics.
