= Juan Maegli =

Guatemalan sailor

Personal information
- Full name: Juan Estuardo Maegli Novella
- Nationality: Guatemalan
- Born: 15 April 1958 (age 67)
- Height: 190 cm (6 ft 3 in)
- Weight: 97 kg (214 lb)

Juan Estuardo Maegli Novella (born 15 April 1958) is a Guatemalan sailor. He competed at the 1976 Summer Olympics, the 1980 Summer Olympics, and the 1984 Summer Olympics.

His son Juan Ignacio Maegli was also an Olympic sailor for Guatemala.
