= Andrés Torres (cyclist) =

Guatemalan cyclist

Personal information
- Born: 30 November 1966 (age 59)

Cycling career
- Sport: Cycling

Andrés Torres (born 30 November 1966) is a Guatemalan former cyclist. He competed in two events at the 1988 Summer Olympics.
