= Edgar Tornez =

Guatemalan weightlifter

Personal information
- Nationality: Guatemalan
- Born: 4 September 1954 (age 70)

Sport
- Sport: Weightlifting

Edgar Tornez (born 4 September 1954) is a Guatemalan weightlifter. He competed in the men's bantamweight event at the 1976 Summer Olympics.
