= María Isabel Sanz-Agero =

Guatemalan modern pentathlete (born 1965)

Personal information
- Nationality: Guatemalan
- Born: November 20, 1965 (age 59)

Sport
- Sport: Modern pentathlon

María Isabel Sanz-Agero (born November 20, 1965) is a Guatemalan modern pentathlete. She placed 31st in the women's individual event at the 2004 Summer Olympics. She is the mother of modern pentathlete Rita Sanz-Agero.
