= Athletics at the 2012 Summer Olympics – Men's 20 kilometres walk =

Men's 20 kilometres walk at the Games of the XXX Olympiad
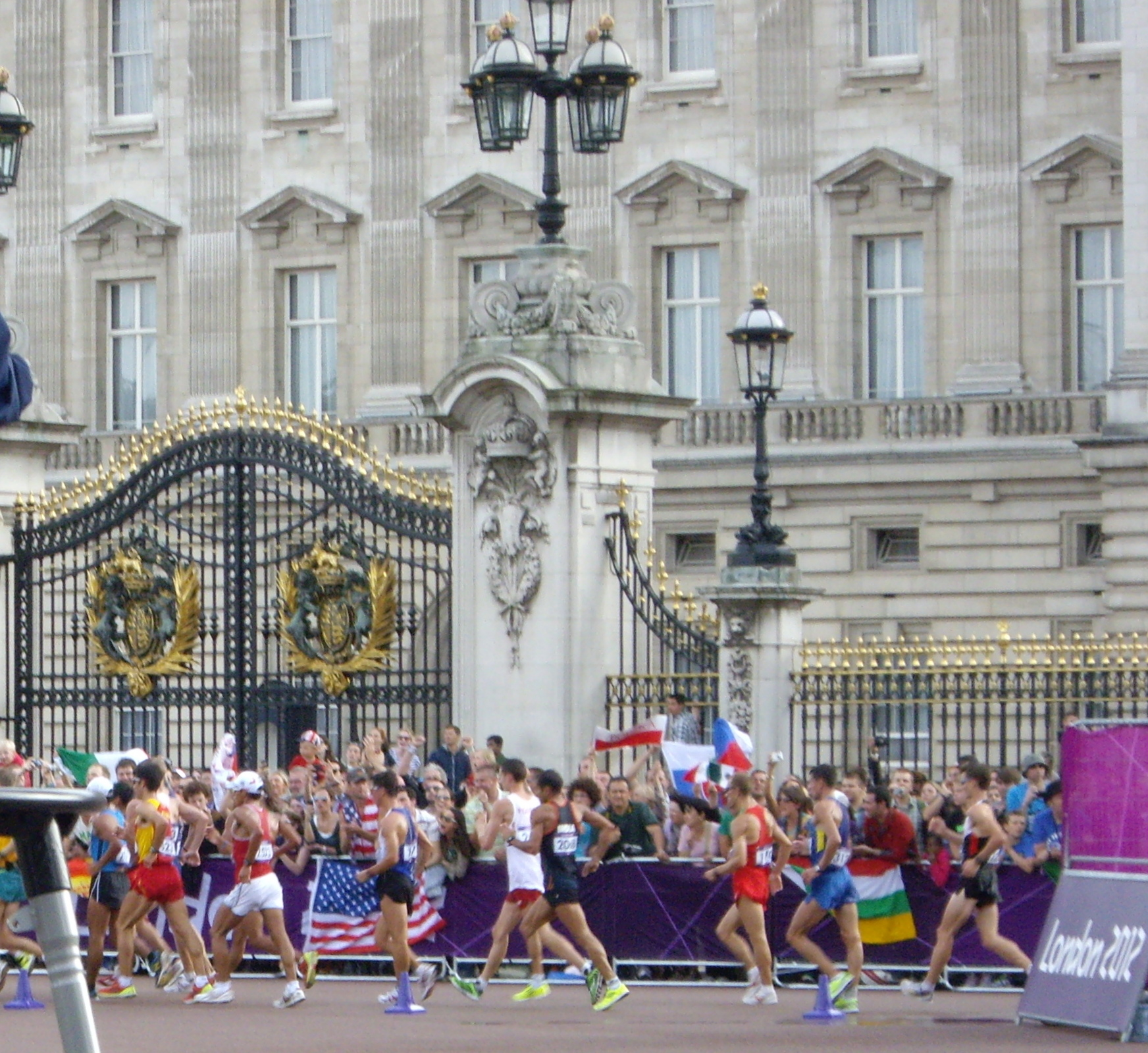
- Venue: The Mall
- Date: 4 August 2012
- Competitors: 56 from 34 nations
- Winning time: 1:18:46 OR

Medalists
1st place, gold medalist(s)		Chen Ding	China
2nd place, silver medalist(s)		Erick Barrondo	Guatemala
3rd place, bronze medalist(s)		Wang Zhen	China

Official Video

The men's 20 kilometres race walk at the 2012 Summer Olympics in London took place on 4 August on a route along The Mall and Constitution Hill in central London.

Robert Heffernan and Grzegorz Sudol took the early lead, soon joined by Yusuke Suzuki. Like a bicycle race, the unheralded Suzuki steadily broke away from the peloton. Suzuki led past the 8k mark but was eventually swallowed by a group led by Wang Zhen, followed by his teammate Chen Ding and Valeriy Borchin. By the half way mark the lead pack was down to twelve. Around the 11K mark, leader Wang made an odd gesture, hand over head, to the pack behind him, moments later Bertrand Moulinet broke away from the pack as Wang slowed. After gaining as much as a seven-second lead, the chasers caught back up to Moulinet and left him to fall off the pace, while Chen took his turn to break off the front as the pack started to string out in chase. Wang, Borchin and Erick Barrondo were the strongest chasers, forming a pack of four. A few minutes later Vladimir Kanaykin, then Luis Fernando López managed to bridge back to the leaders. Moments after joining the lead group, Lopez was given the red paddle, signifying his disqualification. Kanaykin was also given the paddle a minute after that. For a moment they were four abreast, but again Chen put the hammer down, eventually dropping Wang. By the bell Chen had built an 8-second lead over Borchin, who was picking up warnings and cards from the judges. Chen signaled one finger to the crowd. As Borchin struggled, Wang zoomed past the two remaining chasers. Barrondo reacted and accelerated to put some distance ahead of Wang. An exhausted Borchin chased for only a few moments then collapsed into a fence alongside the course. The third Chinese Zelin Cai hovered off the back of the pack and steadily picked off all the stragglers to eventually finish fourth for a remarkable 1-3-4 team performance. A jubilant Chen celebrated all the way from the final turn. Even though he gave up significant time along the way, Chen set a new Olympic Record at 1:18:46. China's Chen Ding won the gold medal. Erick Barrondo from Guatemala won silver and Wang Zhen, also of China, took bronze. Barrondo's silver medal was the first Olympic medal for Guatemala.

== Schedule ==
All times are British Summer Time (UTC+1)

Date	Time	Round
4 August 2012	17:00	Final

== Records ==
Prior to this event, the existing World and Olympic records stood as follows.

World record	Vladimir Kanaykin (RUS)	1:17:16	Saransk, Russia	29 September 2007
Olympic record	Robert Korzeniowski (POL)	1:18:59	Sydney, Australia	22 September 2000
2012 World leading	Alex Schwazer (ITA)	1:17:30	Lugano, Switzerland	18 March 2012

The following new Olympic record was set during this event:

Date	Event	Athlete	Time	Notes
4 August	Final	Chen Ding (CHN)	1:18:46	OR

The following National records were set during this competition.

China national record	Chen Ding (CHN)	1:18:46
India national record	Irfan Kolothum Thodi (IND)	1:20:21
Canada national record	Inaki Gomez (CAN)	1:20:58
Greece national record	Alexandros Papamichail (GRE)	1:21:12
Argentina national record	Juan Manuel Cano (ARG)	1:22:10

== Result ==
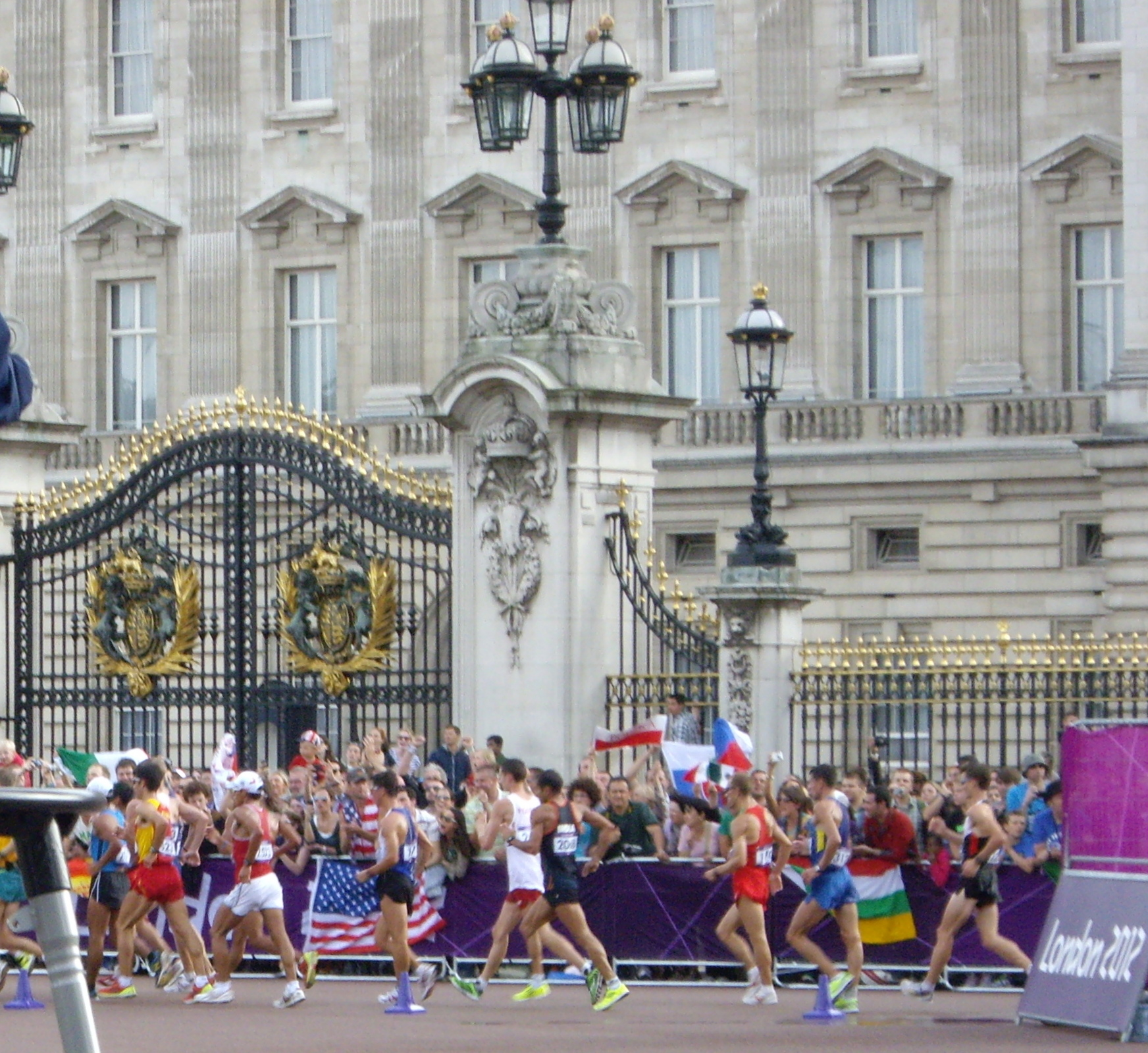
Racers walk past the gates of Buckingham Palace

Rank	Athlete	Nationality	Time	Notes
1st place, gold medalist(s)	Chen Ding	China	1:18:46	OR
2nd place, silver medalist(s)	Érick Barrondo	Guatemala	1:18:57	
3rd place, bronze medalist(s)	Wang Zhen	China	1:19:25	
4	Cai Zelin	China	1:19:44	
5	Miguel Ángel López	Spain	1:19:49	PB
6	Eder Sánchez	Mexico	1:19:52	SB
7	Jared Tallent	Australia	1:20:02	SB
8	Bertrand Moulinet	France	1:20:12	PB
9	Robert Heffernan	Ireland	1:20:18	SB
10	Irfan Kolothum Thodi	India	1:20:21	NR
11	João Vieira	Portugal	1:20:41	SB
12	Dzianis Simanovich	Belarus	1:20:42	PB
13	Inaki Gomez	Canada	1:20:58	NR
14	Erik Tysse	Norway	1:21:00	SB
15	Alexandros Papamichail	Greece	1:21:12	NR
16	Ivan Trotski	Belarus	1:21:23	SB
17	Kim Hyun-Sub	South Korea	1:21:36	SB
18	Isamu Fujisawa	Japan	1:21:48	
19	Dawid Tomala	Poland	1:21:55	
20	Éider Arévalo	Colombia	1:22:00	
21	André Höhne	Germany	1:22:02	
22	Juan Manuel Cano	Argentina	1:22:10	NR
23	Anton Kučmín	Slovakia	1:22:25	PB
24	Grzegorz Sudoł	Poland	1:22:40	
25	Takumi Saito	Japan	1:22:43	
26	Trevor Barron	United States	1:22:46	
27	Nazar Kovalenko	Ukraine	1:22:54	
28	James Rendón	Colombia	1:22:54	SB
29	Rafał Augustyn	Poland	1:23:17	
30	Ruslan Dmytrenko	Ukraine	1:23:21	
31	Byun Young-Jun	South Korea	1:23:26	
32	Máté Helebrandt	Hungary	1:23:32	PB
33	Gurmeet Singh	India	1:23:34	
34	Isaac Palma	Mexico	1:23:35	
35	Georgiy Sheiko	Kazakhstan	1:23:52	
36	Yusuke Suzuki	Japan	1:23:53	SB
37	Andrey Krivov	Russia	1:24:17	
38	Chris Erickson	Australia	1:24:19	
39	Caio Bonfim	Brazil	1:24:45	
40	Marius Žiūkas	Lithuania	1:24:45	
41	Yerko Araya	Chile	1:25:27	SB
42	Giorgio Rubino	Italy	1:25:28	
43	Baljinder Singh	India	1:25:39	
44	Mauricio Arteaga	Ecuador	1:25:51	
45	Arnis Rumbenieks	Latvia	1:26:26	
46	Ever Palma	Mexico	1:26:30	
47	Ivan Losyev	Ukraine	1:26:50	
48	Predrag Filipović	Serbia	1:27:22	
–	Valeriy Borchin	Russia	–	DNF, DQ
–	Álvaro Martín	Spain	–	DNF
–	Park Chil-Sung	South Korea	–	DNF
–	Ebrahim Rahimian	Iran	–	DNF
–	Adam Rutter	Australia	–	DNF
–	Hassanine Sebei	Tunisia	–	DNF
–	Vladimir Kanaykin	Russia	–	DQ
–	Luis Fernando López	Colombia	–	DQ
