= Víctor Castellanos =

Guatemalan sports shooter

Personal information
- Born: 20 April 1934 Guatemala City, Guatemala
- Died: 21 February 1999 (aged 64)

Sport
- Sport: Sports shooting
Medal record
Pan American Games
Gold medal – first place	1971 Cali	25 m rapid fire pistol

Víctor Manuel Castellanos Barrios (20 April 1934 – 21 February 1999) was a Guatemalan sports shooter. He competed at the 1968 Summer Olympics and the 1972 Summer Olympics.
