= Waleska Soto =

Guatemalan sport shooter (born 1990)

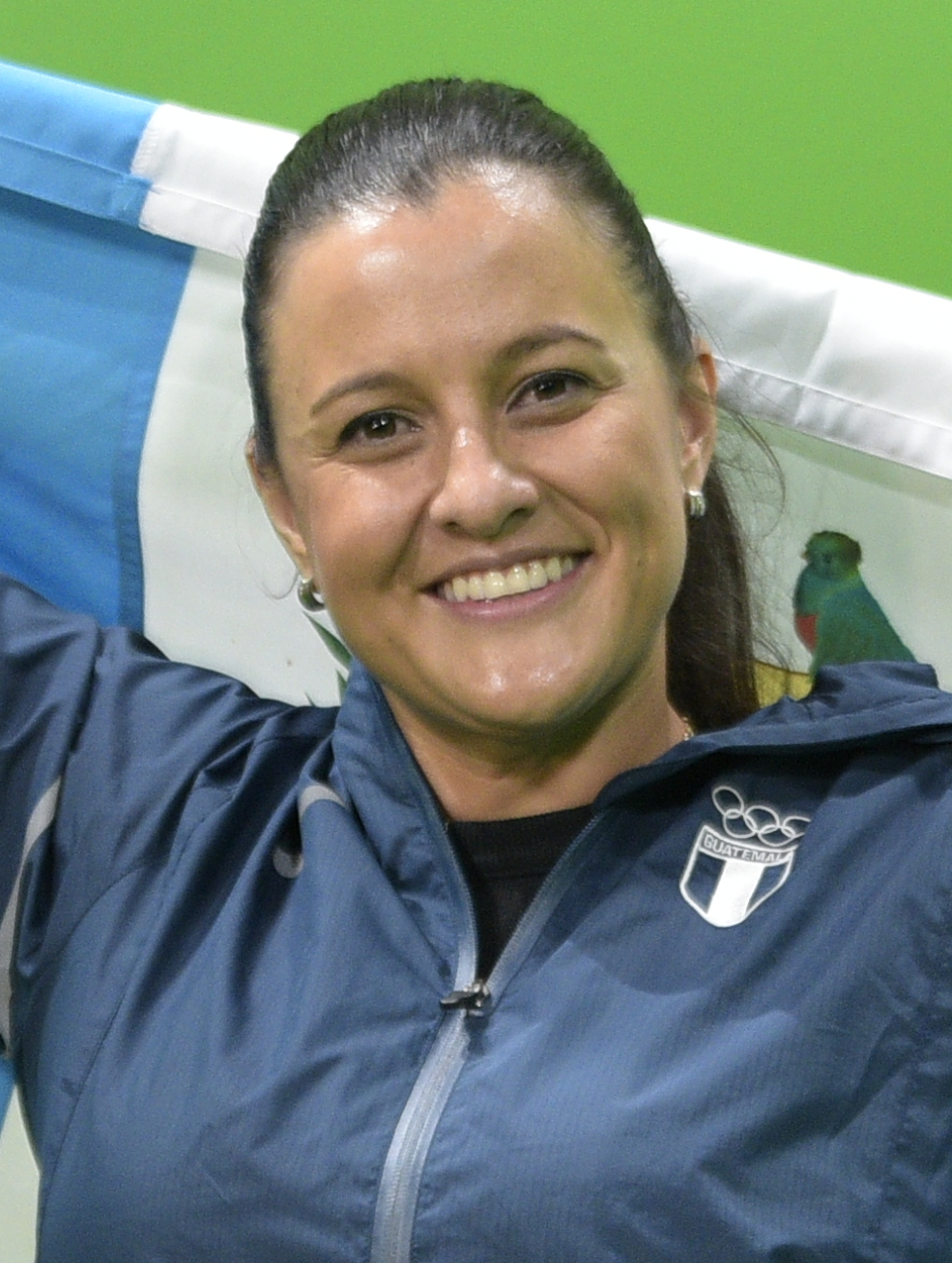
- Soto in 2024

Personal information
- Full name: Ana Waleska Soto Abril
- Nationality: Guatemalan
- Born: 14 August 1990 (age 36) Guatemala City, Guatemala
- Height: 1.65 m (5 ft 5 in)
- Other interests: Pilot and a Sports Psychologist

Sport
- Country: Guatemala
- Sport: Sports shooting
- Rank: 19
- Coached by: Pedro Martin Fariza
Medal record
Representing Guatemala
Women's shooting
Pan American Games
Silver medal – second place	2023 Santiago	Trap
Central American and Caribbean Games
Silver medal – second place	2014 Veracruz	Trap
Silver medal – second place	2023 San Salvador	Trap
Bolivarian Games
Gold medal – first place	2022 Valledupar	Trap
Bronze medal – third place	2017 Santa Marta	Trap
CAT Games
Gold medal – first place	2024 Santo Domingo	Trap
Women's softball
Central American and Caribbean Games
Bronze medal – third place	2010 Mayagüez	Team

Ana Waleska Soto Abril (born 14 August 1990) is a Guatemalan sport shooter and former softball player. She competed in the women's trap event at the 2020 Summer Olympics. She qualified for the 2024 Summer Olympics by winning the gold medal at the 2024 CAT Shotgun Championship in Santo Domingo.

Waleska Soto started out as a softball player, winning a bronze medal with the Guatemalan national team at the 2010 Central American and Caribbean Games in Puerto Rico, although she learned the sport of shooting as a teenager through a summer camp. She earned a scholarship to play softball at Martin Methodist College in the United States, where she began shooting again.

Soto competed in both sports at the 2014 Central American and Caribbean Games, winning a silver medal in the women's trap event. She won a bronze medal in the same event at the 2017 Bolivarian Games, and placed fourth at the 2019 Pan American Games to qualify for the delayed 2020 Summer Olympics. She won Gold at the 2022 Bolivarian Games, celebrated in Valledupar. She won the silver medal at the 2023 Central American and the Caribbean Games. The same year, she won Silver at the 2023 Pan American Games. In 2024, Soto won the gold medal at the 2024 CAT Shotgun Championship in Santo Domingo.

On 3 July 2024, the Guatemalan Olympic Committee chose Soto and badminton player Kevin Cordón to be the country's flag bearers at the 2024 Summer Olympics.

Olympic Games
Preceded by Isabella Maegli; Juan Ignacio Maegli	Flagbearer for Guatemala; París 2024; With: Kevin Cordón	Succeeded by Incumbent
