= Carlos Silva (sport shooter) =

Guatemalan sports shooter

Personal information
- Nationality: Guatemalan
- Born: 25 August 1952 (age 72)

Sport
- Sport: Sports shooting

Carlos Silva (born 25 August 1952) is a Guatemalan sports shooter. He competed at the 1980 Summer Olympics, the 1984 Summer Olympics and the 1988 Summer Olympics.
