= Juan Carlos Romero (sport shooter) =

Guatemalan sports shooter

Personal information
- Full name: Juan Carlos Romero Arribas
- Nationality: Guatemala
- Born: 12 October 1963 (age 62) Guatemala City, Guatemala
- Height: 1.74 m (5 ft 8 1/2 in)
- Weight: 68 kg (150 lb)

Sport
- Sport: Shooting
- Event: Skeet
Medal record
Representing Guatemala
Pan American Games
Bronze medal – third place	1995 Mar del Plata	Skeet team

Juan Carlos Romero Arribas (born October 12, 1963) is a Guatemalan sport shooter. Romero made his official debut for the 1996 Summer Olympics in Atlanta, where he placed twenty-sixth in men's skeet, with a score of 118 points, tying his position with five other shooters including British-born Cypriot Antonis Nikolaidis.

At the 2000 Summer Olympics in Sydney, Romero competed again for the second time in men's skeet, where he placed thirty-fifth overall, with a score of 117 points, tying his position with four other shooters including forty-two-year-old Michael Schmidt Jr of the United States.

Romero made a comeback from his eight-year absence at the 2008 Summer Olympics in Beijing, where he competed for the third time in men's skeet shooting. He finished only in twenty-sixth place for the two-day qualifying rounds, with a total score of 111 points.
