= Erick Barrondo =

Guatemalan race walker (born 1991)

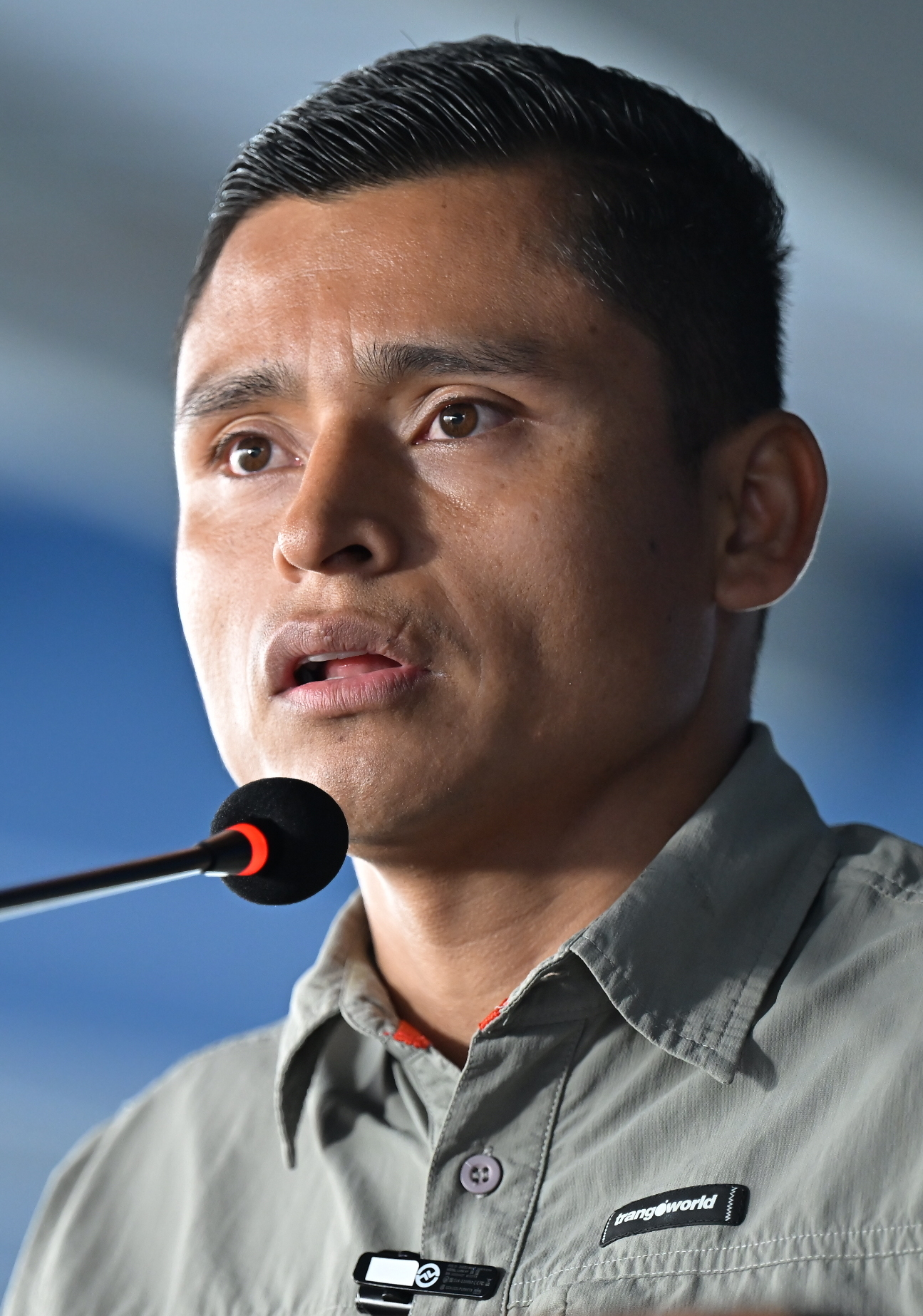
- Barrondo in 2023

Personal information
- Born: 14 June 1991 (age 35) Chiyuc, San Cristóbal Verapaz, Alta Verapaz, Guatemala
- Height: 1.72 m (5 ft 8 in)
- Weight: 60 kg (132 lb)

Sport
- Country: Guatemala
- Sport: Athletics
- Events: 20 km race walk 50 km race walk
- Coached by: Chan Mata and Diego Cabrera
Medal record
Men's athletics
Representing Guatemala
Olympic Games
Silver medal – second place	2012 London	20 km walk
NACAC Championships
Gold medal – first place	2025 Freeport	20,000 m walk
Pan American Games
Gold medal – first place	2011 Guadalajara	20 km walk
Silver medal – second place	2015 Toronto	50 km walk
- Updated on 24 December 2014

Erick Bernabé Barrondo García (born 14 June 1991) is a Guatemalan race walker who competes in the 20 km walk and 50 km walk events. He won the silver medal at the Men's 20 km walk in the 2012 Summer Olympics, the first Olympic medal in Guatemala's history.

== Early life ==
He was born in Aldea Chiyuc in the municipality of San Cristóbal Verapaz, Alta Verapaz Department, Guatemala. Initially, Barrondo competed in long-distance running events, following in the footsteps of his parents. However, he sustained an injury and was introduced to race walking as a method of recovering. He decided to give up running and focus on walking instead. He began working with Rigoberto Medina, a Cuban coach who had trained the 2003 Pan American champion Cristina López.

== Career ==
Barrondo made his international debut at the 2011 Pan American Race Walking Cup, where he claimed the silver medal in the 20 km with a time of 1:25:56 hours. Competing in the 2011 IAAF World Race Walking Challenge tour, he came in 13th at the Sesto San Giovanni race and then improved his personal best by over four minutes at the Dublin Race Walking Grand Prix, coming in fourth place with a time of 1:20:58 hours. As a result of this performance, he was selected to represent Guatemala at the 2011 World Championships in Athletics, being one of only two entrants from his country, alongside fellow walker Jamy Franco. In the World Championships 20 km race, he came in tenth place with a time of 1:22:08 hours and was the second best performer from the Americas, behind Colombia's Luis Fernando López who came third.

At the 2011 Pan American Games in October, he and Jamy Franco completed a Guatemalan double in the men's and women's 20 km walks. Barrondo won the gold medal in a time of 1:21:51 hours, seeing off a challenge from World Championships medalist López. He walked to a personal best in the 20 km at the 2012 Memorial Mario Albisetti, taking third place in 1:18:25 hours.

=== 2012 Summer Olympics ===
In the London Olympics of 2012 he won Guatemala's first ever Olympic medal. He came in the second place in the 20 kilometers race with the time of 1:18:57, just eleven seconds behind China's Chen Ding, who set a new Olympic record. In the 50 kilometers race he was disqualified by the judges.

Barrondo has participated in the Olympics of 2016 and 2020.

=== Personal life ===
After the world championships that took place in Moscow in August 2013, he married race walker Mirna Ortiz.

Barrondo, the first Olympic medalist in Guatemala's history, is of indigenous descent. In April 2015 radio commentator Julio Reyes was widely criticized after making racist comments online regarding Barrondo's heritage.

== Personal bests ==
Event	Result	Venue	Date	
Road walk
10 km	39:52 min	Borský Mikuláš, Slovakia	1 June 2019	
20 km	1:18:25 hrs	Lugano, Switzerland	18 March 2012	
50 km	3:41:09 hrs	Dudince, Slovakia	23 March 2013	AR, NR
Track walk
10,000 m	40:10.73 min	Guatemala City, Guatemala	25 October 2013	
20,000 m	1:34:35.14 hrs	Guatemala City, Guatemala	18 September 2010	

== Achievements ==
Year	Competition	Venue	Position	Event	Notes
Representing Guatemala
2010	Central American Junior Championships	Panama City, Panama	1st	10,000 m	48:16.69
2010	Central American Championships	Guatemala City, Guatemala	4th	20,000 m	1:34:35.14
2011	Central American Race Walking Cup	San Salvador, El Salvador	1st	20 km	1:24:34
2011	Pan American Race Walking Cup	Envigado, Colombia	2nd	20 km	1:25:56
2011	World Championships	Daegu, South Korea	10th	20 km	1:22:08
2011	Pan American Games	Guadalajara, Mexico	1st	20 km	1:21:51
2012	World Race Walking Cup	Saransk, Russia	—	20 km	DQ
2012	Olympic Games	London, United Kingdom	2nd	20 km	1:18:57
2012	Olympic Games	London, United Kingdom	—	50 km	DQ
2013	Dudinska Patdesiatka	Dudince, Slovakia	1st	50 km	3:41:09
2013	World Championships	Moscow, Russia	—	20 km	DQ
2013	Bolivarian Games	Trujillo, Peru	1st	20 km	1:23:25
2014	South American Race Walking Championships	Cochabamba, Bolivia	2nd	20 km	1:26:42 A
2014	World Race Walking Cup	Taicang, China	—	20 km	DQ
2014	Central American and Caribbean Games	Xalapa, Mexico	—	20 km	DQ
2014	Central American and Caribbean Games	Xalapa, Mexico	1st	50 km	3:49:40 A
2015	Pan American Race Walking Cup	Arica, Chile	1st	20 km	1:21:25
2015	Pan American Race Walking Cup	Arica, Chile	3rd	Team (20 km)	32 pts
2015	Pan American Games	Toronto, Canada	—	20 km	DQ
2015	Pan American Games	Toronto, Canada	2nd	50 km	3:55:57
2015	World Championships	Beijing, China	—	50 km	DQ
2025	NACAC Championships	Freeport, Bahamas	1st	20,000 m	1:28:54.12
2025	Bolivarian Games	Lima, Peru	3rd	42,195 km	3:18:41

Olympic Games
Preceded by Juan Ignacio Maegli	Flagbearer for Guatemala; Rio de Janeiro 2016	Succeeded by Incumbent
