= Juan Ignacio Maegli =

Guatemalan sailor (born 1988)

Juan Maegli
Personal information
- Full name: Juan Ignacio Maegli Agüero
- Nationality: Guatemala
- Born: 21 July 1988 (age 37) Guatemala City
- Height: 183 cm (6 ft 0 in)
- Weight: 84 kg (185 lb)

Sailing career
- Sport: Sailing
- College team: College of Charleston
Medal record
Sailing
Representing Guatemala
Pan American Games
Bronze medal – third place	2003 Santo Domingo	Hobie 16
Gold medal – first place	2007 Rio	Hobie 16
Bronze medal – third place	2011 Guadalajara	Laser
Gold medal – first place	2015 Toronto	Laser
Gold medal – first place	2019 Lima	Laser
Bronze medal – third place	2023 Santiago	Laser

Juan Ignacio Maegli Agüero (Note: In this Spanish name, the first or paternal surname is Maegli and the second or maternal family name is Agüero.) (born 21 July 1988, in Guatemala City) is a Guatemalan sailor who competed at the 2008 and 2012 Summer Olympics in the Laser class event where he finished 33rd and 9th respectively. He was the flag bearer for Guatemala during the 2012 Olympic opening ceremony.

== College ==
He won the ICSA Coed Dinghy National Championship with the College of Charleston in 2013 and was named College Sailor of the Year that same year.

== Olympic Games ==
He competed for Guatemala at the 2016 Summer Olympics in Laser class event, where he finished 8th. He was the flag bearer for Guatemala during the closing ceremony.

He represented Guatemala at the 2020 Summer Olympics serving as a flag bearer during the Parade of Nations. He finished 19th in the Laser division.

His father Juan Maegli was also an Olympic sailor for Guatemala.

== Notes ==
Summer Olympics
Preceded by Kevin Cordón	Flagbearer for Guatemala; London 2012	Succeeded by Ana Sofía Gómez
Preceded by Ana Sofía Gómez	Flagbearer for Guatemala; Tokyo 2020 with Isabella Maegli	Succeeded by Kevin Cordón; Waleska Soto
