= Guatemalan Olympic Committee =

National Olympic Committee

- Country: Guatemala
- Code: GUA
- Created: 1947
- Recognized: 1947
- Continental Association: PASO
- Headquarters: Guatemala City, Guatemala
- President: Gerardo Rene Aguirre Oestmann
- Secretary General: Juan Carlos Sagastume Bendaña
- Website: cog.org.gt

The Guatemalan Olympic Committee (Spanish: Comité Olímpico Guatemalteco, abbreviated as COG) (IOC Code: GUA) is a non-profit organization serving as the National Olympic Committee of Guatemala and a part of the International Olympic Committee and PASO. It was formed in 1947 and recognized by the IOC that same year.

== Suspension ==
On 15 October 2022 the International Olympic Committee officially suspended the National Olympic Committee of Guatemala. This was due in large part to issues with elections of the COG. Most importantly was the dispute of the election of the head of the COG.At the same time the IOC gave a final warning to the Olympic Committee of India. As a result of the suspension, any athletes of Guatemala no longer had the ability represent the country and compete under the country's flag/name at the Olympic Games and other international multi-sports events. The Guatemalan NOC would also lose all the funding from IOC.

On March 19, 2024, the IOC EB provisionally lifted the suspension of Guatemala's NOC.

== Presidents ==
President	Term
Roberto Barrios Peña	1947–1948
Edmundo R. Nanne	1948–1950
Humberto González Juárez	1951–1952
Alfonso Martínez Estévez	1952–1953
Miguel Massis	1953–1954
Augusto Putzeys Rojas	1954–1955
Manuel Ruano Mejía	1956
Julio Illescas Rojas	1956–1957
Roberto Ortiz y Ortiz	1958–1959
Julio Flores Toledo	1959–1960
Justo Ramiro García	1960–1961
Donaldo Álvarez Ruíz	1962–1963
Tomas Villamar Contreras	1967–1968
Enrique García de León	1969–1970
Luis Canella Gutiérrez	1970–1973
Alejandro Giammattei Cáceres	1973–1981
Kenneth J. Downing	1981–1982
Willi Kaltschmitt Lujan	1983–1993
Fernando Beltranena Valladares	1993–2009
Sergio Camargo Muralles	2009–2013
Gerardo Rene Aguirre Oestmann	2014–present

== Executive committee ==
The committee of the Guatemalan Olympic Committee is represented by:

- President: Gerardo Rene Aguirre Oestmann
- Vice Presidents: Juan Carlos Sagastume
- IOC Member: Willi Kaltschmitt Luján
- Members: Lorena Toriello, Claudia Rivera, Rafael Cuestas

== See also ==
- Category:Olympic competitors for Guatemala
- Guatemala at the Olympics
- Guatemala at the Paralympics
