= France at the 1972 Summer Olympics =

- IOC code: FRA
- NOC: French National Olympic and Sports Committee

in Munich
- Competitors: 227 (197 men and 30 women) in 18 sports
- Flag bearer: Jean-Claude Magnan
- Medals Ranked 17th: Gold 2 Silver 4 Bronze 7 Total 13

Summer Olympics appearances (overview)
- 1896; 1900; 1904; 1908; 1912; 1920; 1924; 1928; 1932; 1936; 1948; 1952; 1956; 1960; 1964; 1968; 1972; 1976; 1980; 1984; 1988; 1992; 1996; 2000; 2004; 2008; 2012; 2016; 2020; 2024

Other related appearances
- 1906 Intercalated Games

France competed at the 1972 Summer Olympics in Munich, West Germany. 227 competitors, 197 men and 30 women, took part in 132 events in 18 sports.

== Medalists ==
=== Gold ===
- Daniel Morelon — Cycling, Men's 1000m Sprint (Scratch)
- Serge Maury — Sailing, Men's Finn

=== Silver ===
- Guy Drut — Athletics, Men's 110m Hurdles
- Jacques Ladegaillerie — Fencing, Men's Épée Individual
- Michel Carrega — Shooting, Men's Trap Shooting
- Marc Pajot and Yves Pajot — Sailing, Men's Flying Dutchman

=== Bronze ===
- Gilles Bertould, Jacques Carette, Francis Kerbiriou, and Roger Vélasquez — Athletics, Men's 4 × 400 m Relay
- Jean-Claude Olry and Jean-Louis Olry — Canoeing, Men's C2 Canadian Slalom Pairs
- Christian Noël — Fencing, Men's Foil Individual
- Gilles Berolatti, Jean-Claude Magnan, Christian Noël, Daniel Revenu, and Bernard Talvard — Fencing, Men's Foil Team
- Jean-Jacques Mounier — Judo, Men's Lightweight (63 kg)
- Jean-Paul Coche — Judo, Men's Middleweight (80 kg)
- Jean-Claude Brondani — Judo, Men's Open Class

== Archery ==
In the first modern archery competition at the Olympics, France entered three men and two women. Their highest placing competitor was Jacques Doyen, at 21st place in the men's competition.

Men's Individual Competition:

- Jacques Doyen – 2369 points (→ 21st place)
- Louis Lemirre – 2266 points (→ 42nd place)
- Alain Convard – 2251 points (→ 44th place)

Women's Individual Competition:

- Herrad Frey – 2230 points (→ 27th place)
- Pierrette Dame – 2196 points (→ 31st place)

== Athletics ==
Men's 100 metres

- André Byrame
  - First Heat — 10.64s (→ did not advance)

Men's 800 metres

- Alain Sans
  - Heat — 1:49.2
  - Semifinals — 1:49.6 (→ did not advance)
- Roqui Sanchez
  - Heat — 1:47.9 (→ did not advance)
- Francis Gonzales
  - Heat — 1:48.8 (→ did not advance)

Men's 1500 metres

- Jean-Pierre Dufrasne
  - Heat — 3:40.8
  - Semifinals — 3:41.6 (→ did not advance)
- Jacques Boxberger
  - Heat — 3:42.6
  - Semifinals — 3:42.4 (→ did not advance)
- Robert Leborgne
  - Heat — DNS (→ did not advance)

Men's 5,000 metres

- Raymond Zembri
  - Heat — 14:34.4 (→ did not advance)

Men's 4 × 100 m Relay

- Patrick Bourbeillon, Jean-Pierre Gros, Gérard Fenouil, and Bruno Cherrier
  - Heat — 39.01s
  - Semifinals — 39.00s
  - Final — 39.14s (→ 7th place)

Men's High Jump

- Bernard Gauthier
  - Qualifying Round — 2.15m
  - Final — 2.15m (→ 14th place)
- Henry Elliott
  - Qualifying Round — 2.15m
  - Final — 2.10m (→ 15th place)

Men's Pole Vault

- François Tracanelli
  - Qualifying Round — 5.10m
  - Final — 5.10m (→ 8th place)

== Boxing ==
Men's Flyweight (– 51 kg)

- Rabah Kaloufi
  - First Round — Lost to Maurice O'Sullivan (GBR), 2:3

Men's Light Middleweight (– 71 kg)

- Michel Belliard
  - First Round — Bye
  - Second Round — Lost to Alan Jenkinson (AUS), 1:4

== Cycling ==
Fifteen cyclists represented France in 1972.

Individual road race

- Régis Ovion — 15th place
- Bernard Bourreau — 39th place
- Marcel Duchemin — 65th place
- Raymond Martin — did not finish (→ no ranking)

Team time trial

- Henri Fin
- Claude Magni
- Jean-Claude Meunier
- Guy Sibille

Sprint

- Daniel Morelon
- Gérard Quintyn

Sprint

- Pierre Trentin
  - Final — 1:07.85 (→ 10th place)

Tandem

- Daniel Morelon and Pierre Trentin → 4th place

Individual pursuit

- Michel Zucarelli

Team pursuit

- Bernard Bocquet
- Jacques Bossis
- Michel Zucarelli
- Jean-Jacques Fussien

== Diving ==
Men's 3m Springboard

- Alain Goosen – 322.41 points (→ 22nd place)

Men's 10m Platform

- Jacques de Schouver – 287.04 points (→ 13th place)

Women's 3m Springboard

- Christiane Wiles – 229.56 points (→ 28th place)

== Fencing ==
19 fencers, 15 men and 4 women represented France in 1972.

Men's foil

- Christian Noël
- Daniel Revenu
- Bernard Talvard

Men's team foil

- Jean-Claude Magnan, Daniel Revenu, Christian Noël, Gilles Berolatti, Bernard Talvard

Men's épée

- Jacques La Degaillerie
- Jacques Brodin
- François Jeanne

Men's team épée

- François Jeanne, Jacques Brodin, Pierre Marchand, Jean-Pierre Allemand, Jacques La Degaillerie

Men's sabre

- Régis Bonissent
- Bernard Vallée
- Philippe Bena

Men's team sabre

- Régis Bonissent, Bernard Dumont, Bernard Vallée, Philippe Bena, Serge Panizza

Women's foil

- Marie-Chantal Depetris-Demaille
- Catherine Rousselet-Ceretti
- Brigitte Gapais-Dumont

Women's team foil

- Marie-Chantal Depetris-Demaille, Catherine Rousselet-Ceretti, Claudie Herbster-Josland, Brigitte Gapais-Dumont

== Hockey ==
Men's Team Competition

- Preliminary Round (Group A)
  - Lost to Pakistan (0-3)
  - Defeated Uganda (3-1)
  - Lost to Belgium (0-1)
  - Lost to Malaysia (0-1)
  - Lost to Spain (2-3)
  - Defeated Argentina (1-0)
  - Lost to West Germany (0-4)
- Classification Match
  - 11th/12th place: Lost to Poland (4-7) after extra time → 12th place
- Team Roster
  - Jean–Paul Sauthier
  - Patrick Burtschell
  - Pierre Roussel
  - Charles Pous
  - Christian Honegger
  - Marc Remise
  - Olivier Moreau
  - Georges Grain
  - Francis Coutou
  - Eric Pitau
  - Alain Tetard
  - Gilles Capelle
  - Marc Chapon
  - Georges Corbel
  - Jean–Luc Darfeuille
  - Yves Langlois

== Modern pentathlon ==
Three male pentathletes represented France in 1972.

Men's Individual Competition:

- Michel Gueguen – 5072 points (→ 10th place)
- Jean-Pierre Giudicelli – 4807 points (→ 22nd place)
- Raoul Gueguen – 4638 points (→ 30th place)

Men's Team Competition:

- Giudicelli, M.Gueguen, and R.Gueguen – 14559 points (→ 7th place)

== Rowing ==
Men's Coxed Pairs

- Jean-Claude Coucardon, Christian Durniak and Alain Lacoste
  - Heat — 8:09.62
  - Repechage — 8:15.25 (→ did not advance)

== Shooting ==
Thirteen male shooters represented France in 1972.

25 m pistol

- Jean Baumann
- Jean-Richard Germont

50 m pistol

- Gérard Denecheau
- Jean Faggion

50 m rifle, three positions

- Gilbert Emptaz
- Patrice de Mullenheim

50 m rifle, prone

- Michel Fontaine
- André Noël

50 m running target

- Roger Renaux

Trap

- Michel Carrega
- Jean-Jacques Baud

Skeet

- Élie Pénot
- Roger Mangin

== Swimming ==
Men's 100m Freestyle

- Michel Rousseau
  - Heat — 52.93s
  - Semifinals — 52.82s
  - Final — 52.90s (→ 7th place)
- Gilles Vigne
  - Heat — 54.34s (→ did not advance)
- Alain Hermitte
  - Heat — 54.57s (→ did not advance)

Men's 200m Freestyle

- Pierre Caland
  - Heat — 2:00.75 (→ did not advance)

Men's 4 × 100 m Freestyle Relay

- Gilles Vigne, Alain Mosconi, Alain Hermitte, and Michel Rousseau
  - Heat — 3:35.84
  - Final — 3:34.13 (→ 7th place)

Men's 4 × 200 m Freestyle Relay

- Pierre Caland, Pierre-Yves Copin, Jean-Jacques Moine, and Michel Rousseau
  - Heat — 8:00.79 (→ did not advance)

== Water Skiing (demonstration sports) ==
Men's Slalom:

- Jean-Michel Jamin – 38.0 points (→ Bronze Medal)

Men's Figure Skiing:

- Jean-Yves Parpette – 2740 points (→ 12th place)

Men's Jump:

- Jean-Yves Parpette – 34.75 points (→ 8th place)

Women's Slalom:

- Sylvie Maurial – 28.0 points (→ 4th place)

Women's Figure Skiing:

- Sylvie Maurial – 2560 points (→ Bronze Medal)

Women's Jump:

- Sylvie Maurial – 27.40 points (→ Gold Medal)
