= Snelling =

Snelling may refer to:

== People ==
- Andrew A. Snelling, Australian geologist and young-Earth creationist
- Sir Arthur Snelling (1914–1996), British civil servant and diplomat
- Barbara Snelling (1928–2015), American politician
- Charles Snelling (figure skater) (born 1937), Canadian Olympic figure skater
- Charles Mercer Snelling (1862–1939), first Chancellor of the University System of Georgia and President of the University of Georgia
- Charlie Snelling (1886–1957), Canadian ice hockey player
- Chris Snelling (born 1981), American baseball player
- Deryk Snelling (1933–2021), British swimming coach
- Diane B. Snelling (born 1952), American politician
- Douglas Snelling (1916–1985), Australian architect and designer
- Henry Hunt Snelling (1817–1897), American photographer, editor, author and inventor
- Jack Snelling (born 1972), Australian politician
- Jason Snelling (born 1983), American football player
- John Snelling (born 1946), British archer
- Josiah Snelling (1782–1828), commander of Fort Snelling
- Ken Snelling (1918–1994), American football player
- Lauraine Snelling, American novelist
- Lilian Snelling (1879–1972), British botanical artist
- Matthew Snelling (1621–1678), English miniature painter
- Mike Snelling (born 1941), British pilot
- O. F. (Oswald Frederick) Snelling (1916–2001), English writer
- Richard A. Snelling (1927–1991), governor of Vermont
- Robby Snelling (born 2003), American baseball player
- Robert Snelling (died 1627), English Member of Parliament
- Roy Snelling (1934–2008), American entomologist
- Thomas Snelling (1712–1773), English numismatist
- Tracey Snelling (born 1970), American artist
- Will Snelling (born 1997), Australian rules footballer
- William Joseph Snelling (1804–1848), American writer
- Walter O. Snelling (1880–1965), American chemist

== Places ==
- Snelling, California
- Snelling, South Carolina
- Minnesota State Highway 51, known as Snelling Avenue for most of its length in Saint Paul, Minnesota

== See also ==
- Fort Snelling (disambiguation)
- Snell (disambiguation)
