= Philippines at the 1972 Summer Olympics =

- Flag of the Philippines
- IOC code: PHI
- NOC: Philippine Amateur Athletic Federation

in Munich
- Competitors: 53 in 11 sports
- Flag bearer: Jimmy Mariano
- Medals: Gold 0 Silver 0 Bronze 0 Total 0

Summer Olympics appearances (overview)
- 1924; 1928; 1932; 1936; 1948; 1952; 1956; 1960; 1964; 1968; 1972; 1976; 1980; 1984; 1988; 1992; 1996; 2000; 2004; 2008; 2012; 2016; 2020; 2024

The Philippines competed at the 1972 Summer Olympics in Munich, West Germany. The Philippines sent its biggest delegation in the history of the Olympic Games with 53 athletes, 48 men and 5 women.

== Archery ==
In the first postwar archery competition at the Olympics, the Philippines entered three men. Their highest placed competitor was Francisco Naranjilla, in 37th place.

Men's Individual Competition:

- Francisco Naranjilla – 2288 points (→ 37th place)
- Carlos Santos, Jr. – 2183 points (→ 50th place)
- Ramon Aldea – 2102 points (→ 54th place)

== Athletics ==
Men's 100 metres

- Tukal Mokalam

- First Heat – 11.02s (→ did not advance)

Women's Discus Throw

- Josephine de la Viña
  - Qualifying Round – 53.29 m (→ did not advance)

== Basketball ==
=== Men's team competition ===
- Pool Play (Group B)

- Lost to Soviet Union (80-111)
- Lost to Italy (81-101)
- Lost to Yugoslavia (76-117)
- Lost to Puerto Rico (72-92)
- Lost to West Germany (74-93)
- Lost to Poland (75-90)
- Defeated Senegal (68-72)

- Semifinal Round

- Defeated Egypt (2-0, forfeit)

- Final Round

- Defeated Japan (80-73) → did not advance, 13th place

- Team Roster
  - William "Bogs" Adornado
  - Narciso Bernardo
  - Ricardo "Joy" Cleofas
  - Danny Florencio
  - Jaime "Jimmy" Mariano
  - Rosalio "Yoyong" Martirez
  - Rogelio "Tembong" Melencio
  - Edgardo "Ed" Ocampo (c)
  - Manny Paner
  - Jun Papa
  - Marte Samson
  - Freddie Webb
  - Head Coach: Ignacio "Ning" Ramos
  - Team Manager: Domingo Itchon

== Boxing ==
Men's Light Flyweight (– 48 kg)

- Vicente Arsenal

- First Round – Lost to James Odwori (UGA), TKO-2

Men's Flyweight (– 51 kg)

- Reynaldo Fortaleza

- First Round – Lost to Fujio Nagai (JPN), 1:4

Men's Light Middleweight (– 71 kg)

- Nicolas Aquilino

- First Round – Bye
- Second Round – Lost to Evengelos Oikonomakos (GRE), 0:5

== Cycling ==
One cyclist represented the Philippines in 1972.

Individual road race

- Maximo Junta – did not finish (→ no ranking)

Individual pursuit

- Maximo Junta

== Judo ==
- Geronimo Dyogi
- Renato Repuyan

== Sailing ==
Soling

- Mario Almario
- Alfonso Qua
- Ambrosio Santos

== Shooting ==
Eight male shooters represented the Philippines in 1972.

25 m pistol

- Rafael Recto
- Tom Ong

50 m pistol

- Arturo Macapagal
- Teodoro Kalaw

50 m rifle, three positions

- Lodovico Espinosa

50 m rifle, prone

- Lodovico Espinosa

Trap

- Manuel Valdes

Skeet

- Melchor Yap
- Raymundo Quitoriano

== Swimming ==
Men's 100m Freestyle

- Luis Ayesa

- Heat – DNS (→ did not advance)

Men's 200m Freestyle

- Luis Ayesa

- Heat – 2:05.97 (→ did not advance)

Men's 4 × 100 m Freestyle Relay

- Luis Ayesa, Dae Imlani, Carlos Singson Brosas and Jairulla Jaitulla

- Heat – 3:47.39 (→ did not advance)

Men's 4 × 200 m Freestyle Relay

- Dae Imlani, Edwin Borja, Carlos Brosas, and Jairulla Jaitulla

- Heat – 8:44.01 (→ did not advance)

== Weightlifting ==
Men's 56 kg

- Arturo del Rosario

Men's 52 kg

- Nigel Trance
- Salvador del Rosario
