= Archery at the 1972 Summer Olympics – Men's individual =

Archery at the Olympics

Men's individual at the Games of the XX Olympiad
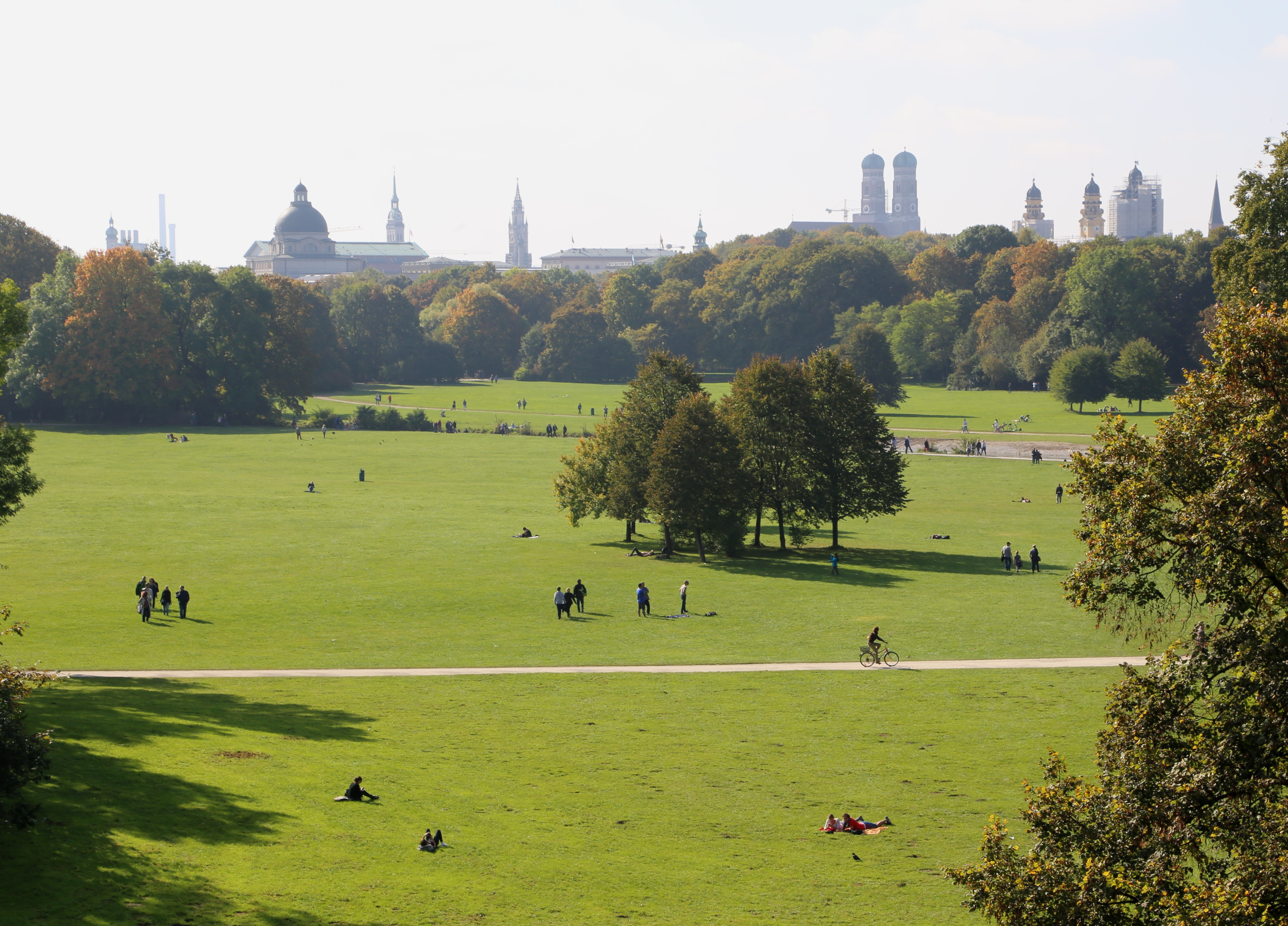
- Modern photograph of Englischer Garten, where the event took place
- Venue: Englischer Garten
- Dates: 7–10 September 1972
- Competitors: 55 from 24 nations
- Winning score: 2528

Medalists
1st place, gold medalist(s)		John Williams	United States
2nd place, silver medalist(s)		Gunnar Jervill	Sweden
3rd place, bronze medalist(s)		Kyösti Laasonen	Finland

The men's individual archery event at the 1972 Summer Olympics was part of the archery programme. The event consisted of a double FITA round. For each round, the archer shot 36 arrows at each of four distances—90, 50, 70, and 30 metres. The highest score for each arrow was 10 points, giving a possible maximum of 2880 points.

== Records ==
The following new Olympic records were set during this competition.

Record	Round	Name	Nationality	Score	OR
Single FITA round	First	John Williams	United States	1268	OR
Double FITA round	Combined	John Williams	United States	2528	OR

== Results ==
Rank	Archer	Nation	Round 1 Score	Round 1 Rank	Round 2 Score	Round 2 Rank	Total Score
1st place, gold medalist(s)	John Williams	United States	1268 (OR)	1	1260	1	2528 (OR)
2nd place, silver medalist(s)	Gunnar Jervill	Sweden	1229	2	1252	3	2481
3rd place, bronze medalist(s)	Kyösti Laasonen	Finland	1213	6	1254	2	2467
4	Robert Cogniaux	Belgium	1205	7	1240	5	2445
5	Edwin Eliason	United States	1193	13	1245	4	2438
6	Donald Jackson	Canada	1225	3	1212	12	2437
7	Victor Sidorouk	Soviet Union	1205	7	1222	7	2427
8	Arne Jacobsen	Denmark	1188	20	1235	6	2423
9	Graeme Telford	Australia	1224	4	1199	16	2423
10	Lucien Trepper	Switzerland	1191	16	1218	8	2409
11	Dennis McComak	United States	1199	9	1199	16	2398
12	Mikhail Peunov	Soviet Union	1222	5	1175	24	2397
13	Herluf Andersen	Denmark	1178	23	1216	10	2394
14	Siegfried Ortmann	West Germany	1175	24	1215	11	2390
15	Terry Reilly	Australia	1193	13	1194	18	2387
16	Rolf Svensson	Sweden	1179	22	1207	14	2386
17	Roy Matthews	Great Britain	1174	25	1211	13	2385
18	Andre Baeyens	Belgium	1190	19	1193	20	2383
19	Hiroshi Kajikawa	Japan	1192	15	1189	22	2381
20	Olavi Laurila	Finland	1155	31	1217	9	2372
21	Jacques Doyen	France	1186	21	1183	23	2369
22	Jakob Wolfensberger	Switzerland	1191	16	1176	25	2367
23	Jos Daman	Belgium	1165	29	1200	15	2365
24	Mati Vaikjärv	Soviet Union	1194	11	1169	30	2363
25	Elmer Ewert	Canada	1194	11	1165	32	2359
26	John Snelling	Great Britain	1195	10	1161	35	2356
27	Olle Boström	Sweden	1168	27	1179	24	2347
28	Alfonso Jones	Mexico	1154	32	1190	21	2344
29	Seiji Hibino	Japan	1150	33	1194	18	2344
30	Richard Krust	West Germany	1172	26	1170	29	2342
31	Alfredo Massazza	Italy	1189	19	1151	39	2340
32	Jan Erik Humlekjær	Norway	1164	30	1175	26	2339
33	Giancarlo Ferrari	Italy	1167	28	1155	36	2322
34	Béla Nagy	Hungary	1135	39	1167	31	2302
35	Sante Spigarelli	Italy	1145	34	1155	36	2300
36	Johannes Akkerhaugen	Norway	1133	40	1155	36	2288
37	Francisco Naranjilla	Philippines	1117	44	1171	28	2288
38	Shinji Nakamoto	Japan	1124	42	1163	34	2287
39	Marcel Balthasar	Luxembourg	1144	36	1141	43	2285
40	Jorma Sandelin	Finland	1142	37	1136	45	2278
41	Wayne Pullen	Canada	1145	34	1130	46	2275
42	Louis-Henry Lemirre	France	1102	46	1164	33	2266
43	Galsangiin Byambaa	Mongolia	1112	45	1141	43	2253
44	Alain Convard	France	1100	47	1151	39	2251
45	Ronald Bishop	Great Britain	1138	38	1106	50	2244
46	Tomasz Leżański	Poland	1128	41	1109	48	2237
47	Jean-Pierre Héritier	Switzerland	1123	43	1099	51	2222
48	Egil Borgen Johansen	Norway	1076	50	1143	42	2219
49	Emilio Ramos	Spain	1092	48	1107	49	2199
50	Carlos Santos, Jr.	Philippines	1062	52	1121	47	2183
51	Rafel Aveleyra	Mexico	1031	54	1147	41	2178
52	José Almanzor	Mexico	1092	48	1083	52	2175
53	Robin Sampson	New Zealand	1060	53	1055	53	2115
54	Ramón Aldea	Philippines	1067	51	1035	54	2102
55	Ferdinand Vega	Puerto Rico	972	55	982	55	1954

- Notes
  1. Jacobsen defeated Telford 76-70 in a tie-breaker to gain 8th place.
  2. Jones defeated Hibino 61-46 in a tie-breaker to gain 28th place.
  3. Akkerhaugen defeated Naranjilla 286-285 in a tie-breaker to gain 36th place.
