= South Korea at the 1972 Summer Olympics =

- IOC code: KOR (COR used at these Games)
- NOC: Korean Olympic Committee

in Munich
- Competitors: 42 (32 men, 10 women) in 8 sports
- Flag bearer: Kim Ji-Hak
- Medals Ranked 33rd: Gold 0 Silver 1 Bronze 0 Total 1

Summer Olympics appearances (overview)
- 1948; 1952; 1956; 1960; 1964; 1968; 1972; 1976; 1980; 1984; 1988; 1992; 1996; 2000; 2004; 2008; 2012; 2016; 2020; 2024

South Korea, as Korea, competed at the 1972 Summer Olympics in Munich, West Germany. 42 competitors (32 men and 10 women), took part in 24 events in 8 sports.

== Medalists ==
Medal	Name	Sport	Event	Date
Silver	Oh Seung-lip	Judo	Men's 80 kg	2 September

== Archery ==
In the first modern archery competition at the Olympics, South Korea entered three women. Their highest placing competitor was Kim Ho-gu, at 7th place in the women's competition.

Women's Individual Competition:

- Kim Ho-gu – 2369 points (7th place)
- Ju Chun-sam – 2349 points (12th place)
- Kim Hyang-min – 2275 points (20th place)

== Athletics ==
Men's High Jump

- Park Sang-soo

- Qualification Round – 2.00m (→ did not advance)

Men's 4 × 100 m Relay

- Lee Chung-ping, Soo Wen-ho, Chen Chin-lung, and Chen Ming-chih

- Heat – 41.78s (→ did not advance)

Women's Shot Put

- Paik Ok-ja

- Qualification Round – 15.78m (→ did not advance)

Women's Discus Throw

- Paik Ok-ja

- Qualification Round – DNS (→ did not advance)

== Boxing ==
Men's Light Middleweight (–71 kg)

- Jae Keun-lim

- First Round – Bye
- Second Round – Defeated Namchal Tsendaiush (MGL), 3:2
- Third Round – Lost to Rolando Garbey (CUB), TKO-2

== Shooting ==
Five male shooters represented South Korea in 1972.

Open

Athlete	Event	Final	
Athlete	Event	Points	Rank
Choi Chung-seok	50 m rifle prone	589	60
Park Do-geun	Skeet	182	44
Kim Nam-gu	Trap	177	41
Kim Tae-seok	Trap	181	32
Park Seong-tae	Skeet	168	56

== Swimming ==
Men's 400 m freestyle:

- Cho Oh-ryun – Heat: 4:21.78 (did not advance)

Men's 1500 m freestyle

- Cho Oh-ryun – Heat: 17:29.23 (did not advance)

== Volleyball ==
Men's: 7th place

- Roster: Choi Jong-ok, Chung Dong-kee, Jin Jun-tak, Kang Man-soo, Kim Chung-han, Kim Kun-bong, Kim Kyui-hwan, Lee Chun-pio, Lee In, Lee Sun-koo, Lee Yong-kwan, and Park Kee-won
- Preliminary round: 2–3
- Semi–Final: Lost to Romania (0–3)
- Final: Defeated Brazil (3–0)

Women's: 4th place

- Roster: Jo Hea-jung, Kim Eun-hui, Kim Young-ja, Lee In-sook, Lee Jung-ja, Lee Kyung-ai, Lee Kyung-sook, Lee Soon-bok, Yoon Young-nae, Yu Jung-hye, and Yu Kyung-hwa
- Preliminary round: 2–1
- Semi–Final: Lost to Japan (0–3)
- Final: Lost to D.P.R. Korea (0–3)

== Weightlifting ==
Lightweight:

- Won Shin-hee – 427.5 kg (7th place)
