= Laurila (surname) =

Laurila is a Finnish surname. Notable people with the surname include:

- Elli Laurila (1882–1966), Finnish politician
- Harri Laurila (born 1965), Finnish ice hockey player
- Henri Laurila (born 1980), Finnish ice hockey defenceman
- Kalevi Laurila (1937–1991), Finnish cross country skier
- Kelly Laurila, Canadian academic
- Liisa Laurila (born 1974), Finnish synchronized swimmer
- Luke Laurila (born 1997), American musician, better known by his stage names Telepath, Tianhuojian and Virtual Dream Plaza
- Maija Laurila (born 1983), Finnish racing cyclist
- Norman Laurila, American bookstore owner
- Olavi Laurila (born 1940), Finnish archer
- Petri Laurila (born 1974), Finnish rapper, better known by his stage name Petri Nygård
- Susanna Laurila, Finnish mountain bike orienteer
