= Aisslinger =

Aisslinger is a surname. Notable people with the surname include:

- Werner Aisslinger (born 1964), German furniture designer
- Horst Aisslinger (1925–1992), German philatelist
