= Brian Hartley =

Brian Hartley may refer to:

- Brian Hartley (mathematician) (1939–1994), British mathematician
- Brian S. Hartley (1926–2021), British biochemist
- Brian Hartley (archaeologist) (1929–2005), British archaeologist
- Brian Hartley, a fictional character in All Tied Up

== See also ==
- Brian Carr-Hartley (born 1938), Kenyan sports shooter
