= Ronald Bishop =

Ronald Bishop may refer to:

- Ron Bishop (1943–2014), American off-road motorcycle racer
- Ronald Bishop (archer) (1931–2023), British Olympic archer
- Ronald Eric Bishop (1903–1989), British aircraft designer
