= Shooting at the 1972 Summer Olympics – Mixed trap =

Trap at the Games of the XX Olympiad
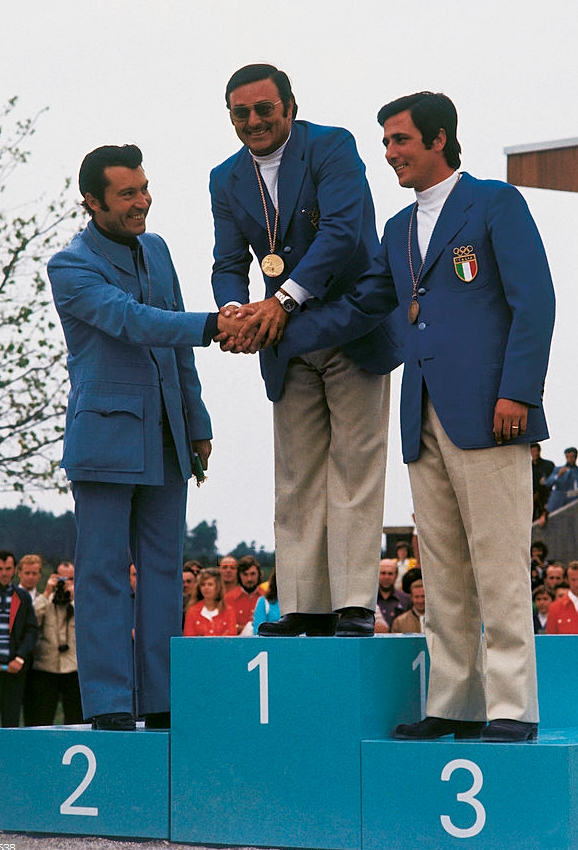
- The medalists on the podium
- Venue: Schießanlage
- Dates: 27–29 August 1972
- Competitors: 57 from 34 nations
- Winning score: 199 WR

Medalists
| 1st place, gold medalist(s) | | Angelo Scalzone | Italy |
| 2nd place, silver medalist(s) | | Michel Carrega | France |
| 3rd place, bronze medalist(s) | | Silvano Basagni | Italy |

The trap competition at the 1972 Summer Olympics was an open-gender event held from 27 to 29 August 1972 at Schießanlage. There were 57 competitors from 34 nations, with each nation limited to two shooters. The 1970 and 1971 world champion and co-holder of the world record Michel Carrega of France finished a surprise second to Angelo Scalzone of Italy, who broke the world record with a near perfect performance of 199 out of 200. Bronze went to Silvano Basagni, also of Italy. Scalzone's victory was Italy's third gold medal in the last five Games; Carrega's medal was France's first medal in the trap since the nation swept the medals in 1900.

== Background ==
This was the 11th appearance of the men's ISSF Olympic trap event. The event was held at every Summer Olympics from 1896 to 1924 (except 1904, when no shooting events were held) and from 1952 to 2016; it was open to women from 1968 to 1996.

Four of the top 10 shooters from the 1968 Games returned: sixth-place finisher (and 1956 silver medalist) Adam Smelczyński of Poland, seventh-place finisher Aleksandr Alipov of the Soviet Union, eighth-place finisher John Primrose of Canada, and tenth-place finisher Karni Singh of India. Two-time (1970 and 1971) reigning World Champion Michel Carrega of France was favored in the event; 1969 World Champion (and 1964 Olympic gold medalist) Ennio Mattarelli was not on the Italian squad, with Angelo Scalzone and Silvano Basagni the pair from Italy.

Brazil, Kenya, Swaziland, and Syria each made their debut in the event. Great Britain made its 11th appearance, the only nation to have competed at each edition of the event to that point.

== Competition format ==
The competition used the 200-target format introduced with the return of trap to the Olympics in 1952. Only a single round of shooting was done, with all shooters facing 200 targets. Shooting was done in 8 series of 25 targets. Ties were broken by the best score in round 8, if still tied after that it goes to round 7 and continues until the tie is broken.

== Records ==
Prior to this competition, the existing world and Olympic records were as follows.

| World record | Multiple | 198 | Multiple | Multiple |
| Olympic record | Ennio Mattarelli (ITA); Bob Braithwaite (GBR) | 198 | Tokyo, Japan; Mexico City, Mexico | 15–17 October 1964; 18–19 October 1968 |

Angelo Scalzone broke the world record, hitting 199 of 200 targets.

== Schedule ==
| Date | Time | Round |
|---|---|---|
| Sunday, 27 August 1972; Monday, 28 August 1972; Tuesday, 29 August 1972 | 9:30 | Final |

== Results ==
| Rank | Shooter | Nation | 1 | 2 | 3 | 4 | Course 1 | 5 | 6 | 7 | 8 | Total | Notes |
|---|---|---|---|---|---|---|---|---|---|---|---|---|---|
| 1st place, gold medalist(s) | Angelo Scalzone | Italy | 25 | 25 | 25 | 25 | 100 | 24 | 25 | 25 | 25 | 199 | WR |
| 2nd place, silver medalist(s) | Michel Carrega | France | 24 | 24 | 25 | 25 | 98 | 25 | 25 | 25 | 25 | 198 | |
| 3rd place, bronze medalist(s) | Silvano Basagni | Italy | 24 | 24 | 25 | 25 | 98 | 25 | 25 | 23 | 24 | 195 | |
| 4 | Burckhardt Hoppe | East Germany | 25 | 25 | 24 | 21 | 95 | 24 | 24 | 25 | 25 | 193 | |
| 5 | Johnny Påhlsson | Sweden | 23 | 25 | 24 | 25 | 97 | 23 | 25 | 23 | 25 | 193 | |
| 6 | James Poindexter | United States | 24 | 25 | 22 | 25 | 96 | 25 | 24 | 22 | 25 | 192 | |
| 7 | John Primrose | Canada | 25 | 23 | 22 | 24 | 94 | 24 | 25 | 25 | 24 | 192 | |
| 8 | Marcos José Olsen | Brazil | 22 | 25 | 24 | 22 | 93 | 25 | 24 | 24 | 25 | 191 | |
| 9 | Ricardo Sancho | Spain | 25 | 25 | 23 | 23 | 96 | 24 | 22 | 24 | 25 | 191 | |
| 10 | Eladio Vallduvi | Spain | 23 | 24 | 23 | 24 | 94 | 25 | 24 | 24 | 24 | 191 | |
| 11 | Adam Smelczyński | Poland | 24 | 23 | 24 | 20 | 91 | 25 | 25 | 25 | 24 | 190 | |
| 12 | Heinz Leibinger | West Germany | 23 | 24 | 22 | 25 | 94 | 25 | 24 | 23 | 24 | 190 | |
| 13 | Aleksandr Alipov | Soviet Union | 25 | 21 | 25 | 25 | 96 | 23 | 24 | 23 | 24 | 190 | |
| 14 | Gheorghe Florescu | Romania | 23 | 23 | 25 | 24 | 95 | 24 | 24 | 24 | 23 | 190 | |
| 15 | Aleksandr Androshkin | Soviet Union | 25 | 25 | 24 | 23 | 97 | 24 | 22 | 25 | 22 | 190 | |
| 16 | Guy Rénard | Belgium | 24 | 23 | 25 | 24 | 96 | 24 | 23 | 21 | 25 | 189 | |
| 17 | Donald Haldeman | United States | 23 | 24 | 24 | 24 | 95 | 21 | 21 | 25 | 25 | 187 | |
| 18 | Manfred Geisler | East Germany | 23 | 24 | 24 | 24 | 95 | 22 | 23 | 22 | 25 | 187 | |
| 19 | Armando Marques | Portugal | 25 | 23 | 24 | 23 | 95 | 25 | 21 | 23 | 23 | 187 | |
| 20 | Josef Meixner | Austria | 24 | 21 | 23 | 23 | 91 | 23 | 23 | 25 | 24 | 186 | |
| 21 | Ronald Carter | Great Britain | 23 | 23 | 23 | 22 | 91 | 24 | 24 | 23 | 24 | 186 | |
| 22 | Sperry Marshall | Australia | 23 | 20 | 23 | 23 | 89 | 24 | 25 | 25 | 23 | 186 | |
| 23 | Fernando Walls | Mexico | 23 | 23 | 23 | 23 | 92 | 25 | 23 | 23 | 23 | 186 | |
| 24 | Silvano Raganini | San Marino | 22 | 25 | 23 | 24 | 94 | 23 | 24 | 23 | 22 | 186 | |
| 25 | Brian Bailey | Great Britain | 24 | 23 | 21 | 23 | 91 | 23 | 23 | 24 | 24 | 185 | |
| 26 | Peter Blecher | West Germany | 24 | 24 | 22 | 22 | 92 | 24 | 23 | 23 | 23 | 185 | |
| 27 | David Alkon | Mexico | 24 | 25 | 25 | 21 | 95 | 24 | 21 | 23 | 22 | 185 | |
| 28 | Jean-Jacques Baud | France | 24 | 22 | 21 | 24 | 91 | 24 | 23 | 23 | 23 | 184 | |
| 29 | James Platz | Canada | 24 | 24 | 23 | 25 | 96 | 25 | 22 | 19 | 22 | 184 | |
| 30 | Ion Dumitrescu | Romania | 22 | 24 | 24 | 22 | 92 | 23 | 25 | 21 | 22 | 183 | |
| 31 | Paul Vittet | Switzerland | 22 | 22 | 25 | 23 | 92 | 24 | 21 | 22 | 23 | 182 | |
| 32 | Kim Tae-seok | South Korea | 22 | 22 | 21 | 23 | 88 | 23 | 24 | 23 | 23 | 181 | |
| 33 | Egon Hansen | Denmark | 24 | 24 | 21 | 20 | 89 | 24 | 19 | 25 | 23 | 180 | |
| 34 | Karni Singh | India | 21 | 23 | 25 | 22 | 91 | 20 | 22 | 24 | 23 | 180 | |
| 35 | Grzegorz Strouhal | Poland | 22 | 21 | 25 | 19 | 87 | 24 | 23 | 24 | 21 | 179 | |
| 36 | Armando Salvietti | Bolivia | 24 | 23 | 22 | 22 | 91 | 25 | 22 | 20 | 21 | 179 | |
| 37 | Vincenzo Lucchini | Switzerland | 21 | 22 | 23 | 24 | 90 | 20 | 2 | 22 | 24 | 178 | |
| 38 | Dermot Kelly | Ireland | 18 | 23 | 24 | 21 | 86 | 22 | 22 | 25 | 23 | 178 | |
| 39 | Michael Carr-Hartley | Kenya | 21 | 23 | 21 | 25 | 90 | 21 | 21 | 23 | 23 | 178 | |
| 40 | Fettah Güney | Turkey | 21 | 19 | 25 | 23 | 88 | 20 | 22 | 22 | 25 | 177 | |
| 41 | Kim Nam-gu | South Korea | 23 | 21 | 23 | 23 | 90 | 22 | 23 | 21 | 21 | 177 | |
| 42 | Gerry Brady | Ireland | 21 | 22 | 23 | 25 | 91 | 24 | 21 | 19 | 21 | 176 | |
| 43 | Guglielmo Giusti | San Marino | 22 | 21 | 23 | 23 | 89 | 21 | 21 | 22 | 22 | 175 | |
| 44 | Randhir Singh | India | 22 | 22 | 22 | 22 | 88 | 22 | 21 | 23 | 19 | 173 | |
| 45 | Paul Cerutti | Monaco | 19 | 21 | 21 | 23 | 84 | 22 | 23 | 21 | 21 | 171 | |
| 46 | Túlio Miraglia | Brazil | 21 | 21 | 22 | 22 | 86 | 22 | 23 | 21 | 19 | 171 | |
| 47 | Mounzer Khatib | Syria | 22 | 21 | 22 | 24 | 89 | 19 | 22 | 19 | 21 | 170 | |
| 48 | Elias Salhab | Lebanon | 18 | 21 | 22 | 21 | 82 | 24 | 23 | 22 | 19 | 170 | |
| 49 | Juan Jorge Giha Sr. | Peru | 21 | 19 | 22 | 22 | 84 | 17 | 23 | 22 | 22 | 168 | |
| 50 | Joseph Mesmar | Syria | 22 | 21 | 21 | 19 | 83 | 21 | 18 | 23 | 22 | 167 | |
| 51 | Brian Carr-Hartley | Kenya | 19 | 20 | 22 | 20 | 81 | 20 | 20 | 23 | 21 | 165 | |
| 52 | Assaad Andraos | Lebanon | 23 | 21 | 19 | 22 | 85 | 18 | 22 | 17 | 21 | 163 | |
| 53 | Damrong Pachonyut | Thailand | 21 | 22 | 20 | 20 | 83 | 20 | 18 | 19 | 20 | 160 | |
| 54 | Ricardo Roberts | Bolivia | 19 | 19 | 19 | 20 | 77 | 19 | 19 | 21 | 20 | 156 | |
| 55 | Boonkua Lourvanij | Thailand | 18 | 19 | 15 | 20 | 72 | 20 | 21 | 15 | 17 | 145 | |
| 56 | Manuel Valdes | Philippines | 15 | 19 | 14 | 19 | 67 | 13 | 19 | 18 | 21 | 138 | |
| 57 | Philip Serjeant | Swaziland | 17 | 17 | 16 | 16 | 66 | 12 | 11 | 15 | 18 | 122 | |
| — | Nicolas Rodríguez | Cuba | DNS | | | | | | | | | | |
| — | Domingo Lorenxo | Dominican Republic | DNS | | | | | | | | | | |
| — | Riad Yunes | Dominican Republic | DNS | | | | | | | | | | |
| — | Manuel Earnshaw | Philippines | DNS | | | | | | | | | | |
| — | Song Gi-Hyon | North Korea | DNS | | | | | | | | | | |
