= Kvadrat (company) =

Danish textile company

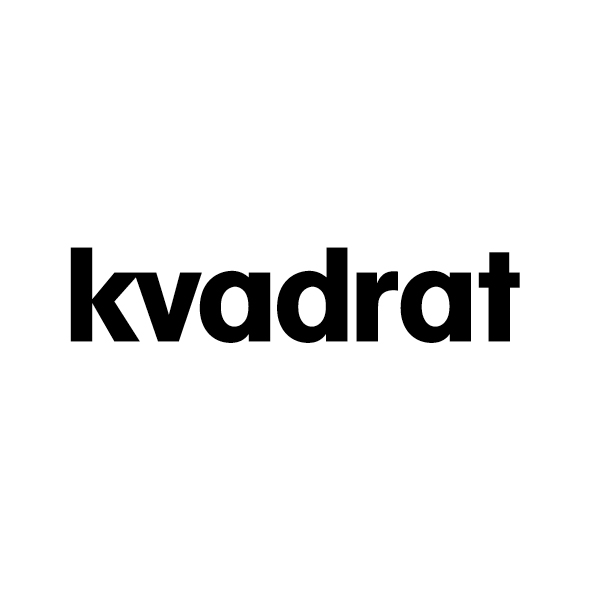
- Industry: Textile design
- Founded: 1968
- Founder: Poul Byriel; Erling Rasmussen
- Headquarters: Ebeltoft, Denmark
- Key people: Anders Byriel, CEO
- Products: textiles and textile-related products
- Website: www.kvadrat.dk

Kvadrat is a Danish textile company that produces and supplies textiles and textile-related products to architects, designers and private consumers in Europe and worldwide. Kvadrat was established in Denmark in 1968 with deep roots in Scandinavia's design tradition.

== History ==
The company Kvadrat was founded by Poul Byriel and Erling Rasmussen in 1968 in Ebeltoft, Denmark. They worked closely with designers such as Nanna Ditzel, Finn Sködt, Nina Koppel and Gunnar Aagaard Andersen and created a portfolio of furniture textiles.

Kvadrat's close collaboration with designers resulted in the creation of classic textiles such as Nanna Ditzel's Hallingdal that has kept a strong presence in private homes, hospitals, airports and trains, most prominently on the Danish National Railways (DSB). National critical recognition of Kvadrat's contribution to design came in 1986 when Danish Museum of Art and Design staged the exhibition Kvadrat Textiles through 20 Years.

In the early 1980s Kvadrat joined the international design scene when they started to work with Italian-based American designer Ross Littell. The company resisted international trends and kept its distinctive Scandinavian style. Kvadrat textiles were used as the bearer of national political symbolism when British architects Foster and Partners were commissioned to design the interior of the Debating Chamber of the Bundestag in the Reichstag, where cobalt blue Topas textile was used "to represent a strong image of Parliament".

The direction of Kvadrat passed to the next generation in the 1990s, when Poul Byriel's son Anders Byriel took over as the CEO along with Erling Rasmussen's daughter Mette Bendix as the product director.

In 2011, Kvadrat bought a 49% share of Wooltex in the UK. In March 2017, Kvadrat announced the purchase of 52% of the Danish sustainable materials company Really.

== Activities ==
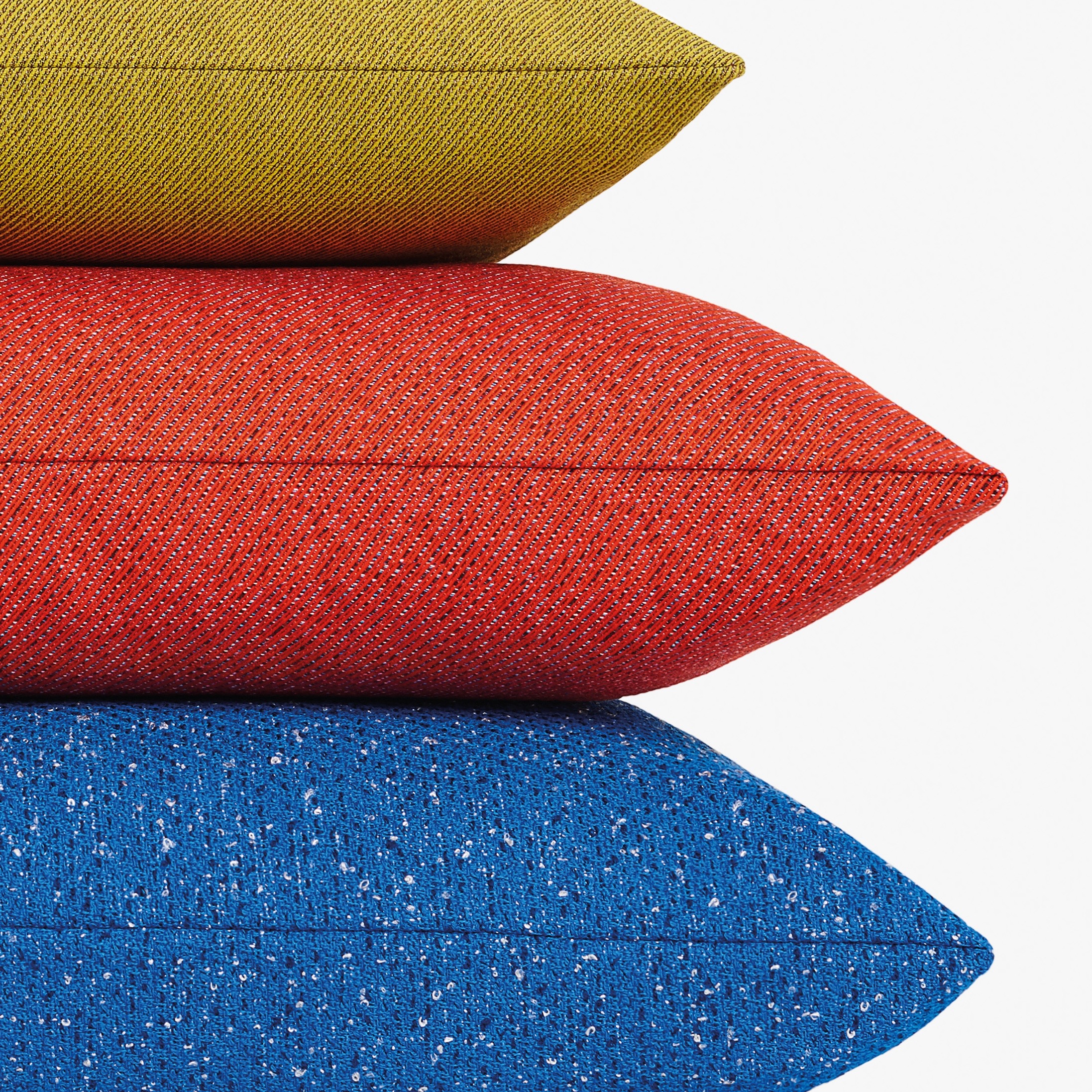
Kvadrat/Raf Simons cushion

Kvadrat (which means the square in Danish) is a producer and supplier of textiles and textile-related products for architects, designers and private consumers in Europe and worldwide.

Kvadrat also develops acoustic panels made of acoustic-absorbing textiles to eliminate the echo in large buildings and open spaces. Its brand Really specializes in upcycling end-of-life textiles into solid textile boards for reuse.

Kvadrat has collaborations with external designers and artists. Throughout the years Kvadrat has worked with designers, architects and artists including Raf Simons, Alfredo Häberli, Peter Saville, Olafur Eliasson, Akira Minagawa, Hella Jongerius, Tord Boontje, Miriam Bäckström and Werner Aisslinger. In June 2017, Kvadrat released 3 models of the Adidas Stan Smith in a partnership with the sports brand.

Kvadrat's design collaborations have resulted in products and projects such as B&O PLAY speakers and Vifa loudspeakers.

== Art and architecture ==
Kvadrat textiles have been used in architectural developments such as The Gherkin in London, Museum of Modern Art in New York, the Walt Disney Concert Hall in Los Angeles, The Reichstag Berlin, Guggenheim Bilbao in Spain, the Copenhagen Opera House in Denmark, Foster & Partners studio in London, Yves St. Laurent in Paris and the Oslo Opera House in Norway.

Kvadrat has actively engaged in projects with artists, museums, galleries and designers. Such projects include:

- Palais de Tokyo – Jesper Just
- Louisiana – Olafur Eliasson
- Danish Architecture Centre – Zaha Hadid Architects
- Haus am Waldsee – Werner Aisslinger
- Whitechapel Gallery – Liam Gillick
- U-Turn Quadrennial for Contemporary Art – Kirstine Roepstorff
- Serpentine Gallery Pavilion – Olafur Eliasson & Kjetil Thorsen
- Museum Ludwig – Rosemarie Trockel
- Kunsthaus Bregenz – Thomas Demand
