= Tae-suk =

- Hangul: 태석
- RR: Taeseok
- MR: T'aesŏk

Tae-suk, also spelled Tae-seok or Tae-sok, is a Korean given name.

People with this name include:

- Oh Taeseok (born 1940), South Korean filmmaker
- Kim Tae-seok (born 1946), South Korean sport shooter
- Chang Tae-suk (born 1968), South Korean fencer
- Ronald Tae-Sok Kim (born 1979), South Korean-born American politician
- Lee Tae-seok (born 1962), South Korean Catholic priest and doctor who helped the people of Tonj, Sudan

Fictional characters with this name include:

- Han Tae-seok, in 2000 South Korean television series Autumn in My Heart
- Tae-seok, in 2002 South Korean television series Age of Innocence
- Jeong Tae-seok, in 2012 South Korean film Confession of Murder

== See also ==
- List of Korean given names
