= Snell =

Snell may refer to:

== People and fictional characters ==
- Snell (surname), list of people and fictional characters with the surname
- Snell (given name), list of people with the name

== Geography ==
=== United States ===
- Snell, Virginia, an unincorporated community
- Snell, Wisconsin, an unincorporated community
- Snell Creek, California
- Snell Valley, California
- Snell Isle, Florida

=== Antarctica ===
- Mount Snell

== Other uses ==
- Snell Acoustics, a manufacturer of audio equipment
- Snell Limited, a manufacturer of digital media products
- Snell Memorial Foundation, an organization which provides standard of safety for helmets
- Snell knot, a hitch knot used to attach an eyed fishing hook to fishing line
- Snell station, a light rail station in San Jose, California

== See also ==
- Snelle (born 1995), Dutch rapper and singer
- Snell's law, the law of refraction in optics, named after Willebrord Snellius
- Snell Arcade, a historic site in St. Petersburg, Florida, United States
- Snells, Wisconsin, United States, an unincorporated community
