= Vifa =

Audio equipment manufacturer

Vifa Denmark A/S
- Type: Privately held
- Founded: 2009; 17 years ago
- Headquarters: Viborg, Denmark
- Products: Audio
- Website: www.vifa.dk

Vifa is a brand name currently owned and used by Danish company Vifa Denmark A/S. In everyday speech, the brand name also refers to the company itself. The company designs and manufactures consumer and professional audio products.

The company traces its roots to "Videbæk Højttalerfabrik" (eng: "The Videbæk Loudspeaker Factory"), a business founded in 1933 by N.C.Madsen, that manufactured electrodynamic loudspeaker units for the radio industry. Operating under the acronym Vifa since 1981, this firm was a respected OEM supplier for many high-end loudspeaker brands. After a series of mergers, restructuring efforts and changes in ownership in order to remain competitive on the international market, the brand name was sold in 2004, and their production finally ceased in 2009.

Starting in 2014, after acquiring the rights to the Vifa brand, Vifa Denmark A/S has been manufacturing a series of wireless loudspeaker systems for the consumer market, named after the capital cities of Scandinavian nations. Reviving the familiar Vifa logo, these products also signified a departure from its roots and a move into new markets. Since 2023, the company has also been making loudspeaker systems for professional sound reinforcement and installation.

== History ==
=== Founding ===
The predecessor to Vifa was founded in 1933 by Niels Christian "N.C." Madsen, in the small town of Videbæk in western Denmark. Originally from the agricultural town of Hjerm near Holstebro, Madsen had developed a talent for mechanical and electrical engineering. At a time when electricity still wasn't available in many rural areas, he among other things built windmills and converted car engines for use as stationary generators by farmers. As he settled in Videbæk, he started a small automotive repair shop.

At the time, the Bang & Olufsen radio factory in Struer was importing electrodynamic loudspeaker drive units for their radio receivers out of France, and was looking to have them manufactured locally instead. They had approached Niels Christian Madsen's brother-in-law, who was a blacksmith, and although he was unable to meet their request, he instead put B&O in touch with Madsen. Together with two of his brothers, who were already employed at the Bang & Olufsen plant, Niels Christian Madsen started developing the required tools and components. Their experiments were successful, and Madsen's final designs were approved by B&O.

The early Videbæk speaker drive units were handmade, with metal parts manufactured in Madsen's auto workshop. Materials for the soft parts, such as cardboard diaphragms and leather suspensions, were sourced from local suppliers. Final assembly was taken care of by mrs. Madsen at the kitchen table. The business was eventually named "Videbæk Højttaler-fabrik" ("The Videbæk Loudspeaker Factory"), and in 1947, production moved into a dedicated factory building at Stationsvej 3, Videbæk.

In 1953, the "Aktieselskabet Videbæk Højttalerfabrik" corporation was formed, with N.C. Madsen as the only share owner. The product brand Hroswitha was at some point chosen for the transducers. The name is claimed to be an older spelling form of Videbæk, but likely just refers to the medieval Saxon poet of the same name.

Apart from B&O, other domestic radio manufacturers, such as SP Radio and Århus Radiolager, would be added to the customer list. Attempts were also made at export, although details are scarce on this point.

=== Norwegian ownership ===
In 1961, preparing for his retirement, Niels Christian Madsen decided to sell the factory shares to his son, engineer Carl Christian Nørgaard Madsen, and Radionette founder Jan Wessel, who by then had established their own loudspeaker manufacturing business in Norway, known by the name SEAS ("Skandinavisk Elektro-Akustisk Selskap"). With the acquisition, most of the original Hroswitha designs were discontinued, but a couple of popular models were adapted to use SEAS' and Carl Christian's patented and standardized magnet assemblies. SEAS' logo and model nomenclature was applied to all products, and the words "SEAS Hroswitha" were for a period stamped into the magnet steel caps.

The Danish and Norwegian factories had already collaborated to some extent during SEAS' startup in the late 40's, with the Videbæk factory supplying SEAS with inner suspension parts, which were difficult to manufacture to precision. The two now experienced great growth together, and were formally made sister companies in 1971. While the facilities in Moss, Norway focused on technological development and production at the higher end of the product stack, the Videbæk factory continued to manufacture more traditional and lower-cost products.

=== Conflict ===
Increasing global competition in the electronics industry during the 1970s led to lower profitability, and the two companies were hit by frequent strikes. Changes had to be made in order to remain relevant, and a new general manager was recruited from the Radionette subsidiary Radio Visjon A/S in Denmark. Decisions made in the following years, increasingly partial to the Videbæk factory, would cause escalating conflict between the two manufacturing sites. Among other things, attempts were made to covertly transfer the most profitable technology, tools and equipment to Videbæk. The transports were deemed illegal, however, and halted at the border.

Attempts were also made to hand off the Moss facilities, but a sale never materialized. Preparations were then initiated for the Norwegian site to be closed instead. This was in turn prevented when unions and politicians became involved. The strategy again shifted, this time in order to separate the two factories by means of economic force. The Videbæk premises were subsequently mortgaged, ostensibly to buy the Seas shares, but with the Danish stock as collateral. A clandestine arrangement with creditor Ringkøbing Landbobank in short order forced a one-day-notice 1,1 million DKK default upon SEAS, and also involved switching off the bank's Telex equipment until the next day. The Videbæk factory was thus dropped into the hands of the bank and the management at the Danish site.

=== Reestablisment ===
Nearly succeeding in bankrupting SEAS, the Danish site broke away in the late summer of 1981, eventually creating its own identity under the brand "Vifa" (an abbreviation of "Videbæk Fabrikker", a registered representation of the actual manufacturing facilities). While the first Vifa-branded products were simply a continuation of older SEAS designs, and predominantly made using SEAS-owned tools, Vifa would over the next few years develop and bring to market their own complete range of loudspeaker drivers, in time rising to become a major player in the European loudspeaker business. A US subsidiary was established in 1982.

With the acquisition of high-end manufacturer Scan-Speak in 1987-89, the Vifa-Speak A/S corporation was formed. Scan-Speak kept its autonomy in research and development, but production was eventually moved to Videbæk in order to benefit from Vifa's infrastructure and finances. The two brands were kept separate, but Vifa also began gearing their own production towards higher quality speaker drivers. Their resulting "Premium Line" model program entered the market in the mid-90s, with a couple of notable innovations.

=== Consolidation attempts ===
In 2000, Vifa-Speak took over the shares of troubled fellow Danish loudspeaker manufacturer Peerless Fabrikkerne AS. Together, they formed DST (Danish Sound Technology), representing some of the finest know-how in the loudspeaker business. Combining their manufacturing structures would prove difficult, though: While Vifa-Speak's production made extensive use of standardized sub-assembly, allowing for great flexibility towards their customers, Peerless' manufacturing closely resembled a sequential production line. While the latter was suitable for uniform high-volume production, any level of design customization would carry an intrinsicly higher cost. It also placed different requirements on e.g. the curing time of glue, necessitating a continued double stockpile of chemicals and other materials.

DST's product tree would largely remain the same, and marketing continued under the well-established Vifa, Scan-Speak and Peerless brand names. Although introducing an all-new Logic brand to target lower-cost segments, limited synergy thus resulted from the merger in practice. The economical boost would also prove temporary: While widely renowned for fine quality and with a history even predating the Videbæk factory, Peerless had at the time of the merger been unable to turn a profit for two decades. Funds spent developing their NXT flat-panel loudspeaker technology, although promising, failed to deliver returns for DST. On the manufacturing side, Vifa's commissioning of a production facility in Panyu, China one year prior to the merger further drained DST. In order to generate much-needed funds, the Vifa brand was finally sold to Guoguang Electric Corp. in 2004.

=== Legacy ===
In 2005, DST was acquired by startup company Tymphany. Based in Cupertino, California, they were at the time known for their prototype LAT ("Linear Array Transducer", first shown at CES 2005) subwoofer concept. The LAT technology ultimately found little success in the market, and growing financial concerns led the company to move most of their remaining manufacturing operations to the Far East, followed by the final sale of these activities to Chinese investors in 2008.

Around the time of Tymphany's acquisition of DST, the Vifa brand was put into use in the marketing of home theatre systems, including the "Touch", "Sense" and "Reference" series of A/V receivers and 5.1 channel loudspeaker sets, all manufactured in China. Although it is unclear when these product ranges were introduced and discontinued, and which regions they were sold in, it seems to have been a relatively short-lived and poorly documented affair.

In 2009, the Scan-Speak branch ended up in ownership of a group of Danish investors, consisting among others of former Scan-Speak management. Some of Vifa's original production tools were included, and a small portion of Vifa's classic loudspeaker drive unit programme remains in production as part of Scan-Speak's Discovery product line. Scan-Speak is now an independent company in the Eastech Group and reside in Vifa's old facilities in Videbæk, Denmark.

Tymphany, now headquartered in Hong Kong, has kept the Peerless brand for their ODM manufacture of loudspeaker drivers, but it also covers amplifier modules for the professional audio segment. Some of Peerless' original designs are still manufactured, and retain Peerless' traditional 6-digit product codes. Parts of the old Vifa product range was initially continued by Tymphany as "Peerless V-Line", avoiding trademark disputes, although only a few of these products are currently (2023) found in their catalogue.

=== Timeline ===
- 1933: Videbæk Højttalerfabrik is founded by N. C. Madsen, and starts supplying loudspeaker drive units to radio manufacturers.
- 1947: Vifa moves into a dedicated factory building at Stationsvej 3, Videbæk.
- 1953: The business is incorporated as "Aktieselskabet Videbæk Højttalerfabrik", with N.C. Madsen as the sole share owner.
- 1961: N.C. Madsen sells all shares of Videbæk Højttalerfabrik to his son C.C. Nørgaard-Madsen and Jan Wessel, owners of SEAS Fabrikker A/S, Norway.
- 1965: Videbæk Højttalerfabrik A/S invests in the construction of a large anechoic chamber for measurements.
- 1971: The factory in Videbæk becomes a sister company to SEAS Fabrikker A/S.
- 1972: Manufacturing expands into complete loudspeaker systems.
- 1977: Export of transducers directly from Videbæk is initiated.
- 1981: The factory in Videbæk establishes itself as an independent company under the Vifa logo.
- 1987: Vifa starts acquiring the Scan-Speak operation and Vifa-Speak A/S is formed, continuing the manufacture of both brands.
- 1991: Scan-Speak moves to facilities in Videbæk, and their trademark is transferred from Dantax Radioindustri A/S to Videbæk Højttalerfabrik A/S.
- 1997: Vifa-Speak A/S acquires a 40% share in Peerless Fabrikkerne AS.
- 2000: Vifa-Speak A/S takes over the remaining Peerless stock to form Danish Sound Technology (DST). A manufacturing facility is established in Pan Yu, China.
- 2003: Vifa International A/S is established in Rødovre, and later Karlslunde, Denmark, to market Vifa-branded A/V systems manufactured in Zhongshan, China.
- 2004: The Vifa brand is sold to the Chinese company GGEC (Guoguang Electric Corp.).
- 2005: DST is acquired by Silicon Valley startup Tymphany, and production of transducers is gradually moved to Xin Xu, China.
- 2008: Tymphany's operations in China are sold to local operators.
- 2009: Tymphany Denmark A/S sells Scan-Speak to the local Danish management, and their other facilities in Denmark are closed down.
- 2009: Vifa Denmark A/S is founded in Viborg.
- 2014: Vifa Denmark A/S acquires the Vifa brand from GGEC.

== Technology ==
- 1994: Vifa engineers design a pentagon-shaped diaphragm, which reduces the severity of resonances at the junction between cone and surround. A patent is applied for in 1996 and granted in 1999. Named 'NRSC' (Non-Resonant Suspension Coupling), the technology is initially employed in Vifa's high-end Premium Line bass and midrange units, but is also used in subsequent product series such as the lower-cost TC-range.
- 1999: The XT-series Ring Radiator tweeter, with a patented phase plug, is launched under the Vifa brand. Scan-Speak engineers later refine the technology to make their own top-end models.

== Rebirth ==
After gradually disappearing from its traditional grounds following the Tymphany merger, the Vifa brand was revived by new owners Vifa Denmark A/S in Viborg, Denmark in 2014. Trading on classic Nordic design traditions and naming their products after the Nordic capital cities, the company announced its first wireless speaker, Copenhagen, supporting Apple Airplay the same year. This was followed by the portable Bluetooth-based Helsinki (2015) and Oslo (2016) speakers, and the Stockholm Hi-Fi soundbar, all adorned with textiles from the Danish textile manufacturer, Kvadrat.

Initially concentrating on household and lifestyle audio devices, Vifa now also manufacture loudspeakers and line arrays for professional installation and sound reinforcement. These products are named after Danish localities.

== Current products ==
- Copenhagen 2.0
- Stockholm 2.0
- Helsinki
- Oslo
- Reykjavik
- City
- Scene

== Collaboration with other brands ==
To establish itself on the international market, Vifa was represented by the sales company SISO. For a brief period in the late 70's and early 80's, export units would therefore also carry a SISO label.

From the 1980s and well into the new millennium, Vifa speaker drivers were widely used among respected loudspeaker brands, such as Aerial Acoustics, Apogee, Dali, JPW, Mission, Ruark, Snell Acoustics, Sony, Thiel, Vandersteen Audio, and many more.

== See also ==
- Bang & Olufsen
- Dali
- Cambridge Audio
