= Herluf =

Herluf is a masculine given name which is common in Scandinavian countries. People with the name include:

== People ==
- Herluf Andersen (1931–2013), Danish archer
- Herluf Bidstrup (1912–1988), Danish painter, cartoonist and illustrator
- Herluf Christensen (1924–1970), Danish athlete
- Herluf Nygaard (1916–2001), Norwegian military officer
- Herluf Stenholt Clausen (1921–2002), Danish ichthyologist
- Herluf Trolle (1516–1565), Danish admiral
- Herluf Winge (1857–1923), Danish zoologist
- Herluf Zahle (1873–1941), Danish barrister and diplomat

== Fictional characters ==
- Herluf C, one of the main characters in the Danish movie Dark Horse (2005 film)
