= Richard Krust =

German archer (born 1928)

Personal information
- Nationality: German
- Born: 4 August 1928 (age 98) Wurmberg, Germany

Sport
- Sport: Archery

Richard Krust (born 4 August 1928) is a German archer. He competed in the men's individual event at the 1972 Summer Olympics in Munich.
