= Assaad Andraos =

Lebanese sports shooter

Personal information
- Born: 6 July 1945

Sport
- Sport: Sports shooting

Assaad Andraos (6 July 1945 – before 2012) was a Lebanese sports shooter. He competed in the trap event at the 1972 Summer Olympics.
