= Ronald Carter (sport shooter) =

British sport shooter

Personal information
- Born: 11 July 1938 (age 87)

Sport
- Sport: Sports shooting

Ronald Carter (born 11 July 1938) is a British former sports shooter. He competed in the trap event at the 1972 Summer Olympics.
