= Mikhail Peunov =

Soviet archer (born 1948)

Personal information
- Nationality: Soviet
- Born: 1 January 1948 (age 78)

Sport
- Sport: Archery

Mikhail Peunov (born 1 January 1948) is a Soviet archer. He competed in the men's individual event at the 1972 Summer Olympics. He started competing in archery at around 15 years old and was a member of the Dynamo Sports Club.
