= Alfonso Jones =

Mexican archer (born 1951)

Personal information
- Nationality: Mexican
- Born: 8 March 1951 (age 74)

Sport
- Sport: Archery

Alfonso Jones Kleiner (born 8 March 1951) is a Mexican archer. He competed in the men's individual event at the 1972 Summer Olympics.
