= Jos Daman =

Belgian archer (born 1945)

Personal information
- Nationality: Belgian
- Born: 15 October 1945 (age 79); Mechelen, Belgium

Sport
- Sport: Archery

Jos Daman (born 15 October 1945) is a Belgian archer born in the borough of Mechelen, Antwerp. He competed in the men's individual event at the 1972 Summer Olympics.
