= James Platz =

Canadian sports shooter (1931–2019)

Personal information
- Born: 25 June 1931 Bruno, Saskatchewan, Canada
- Died: 30 October 2019 (aged 88) Courtenay, British Columbia, Canada

Sport
- Sport: Sports shooting

James Walter Platz (25 June 1931 – 30 October 2019) was a Canadian sports shooter. He competed in the trap event at the 1972 Summer Olympics.

James E. Platz, was a herpetologist at Creighton University, during his tenure there he discovered multiple species of frogs, one, that made its mating call under water named Rana sub aquavocalis.
