= Sperry Marshall =

Australian sports shooter

Personal information
- Born: 19 December 1930
- Died: 1 February 2002 (aged 71)

Sport
- Sport: Sports shooting

Sperry Edward Marshall (19 December 1930 – 1 February 2002) was an Australian sports shooter. He competed in the trap event at the 1972 Summer Olympics.
