= Dennis McComak =

American archer

Personal information
- Born: January 2, 1952 (age 74) Columbus, Kansas, United States

Sport
- Sport: Archery

Dennis McComak (born January 2, 1952) is an American archer. He competed in the men's individual event at the 1972 Summer Olympics.
