= Marcel Balthasar =

Luxembourgish archer (born 1939)

Personal information
- Nationality: Luxembourgish
- Born: 4 June 1939 (age 87) Luxembourg

Sport
- Sport: Archery

Marcel Balthasar (born 4 June 1939) is a Luxembourgish archer. He was born in Luxembourg.

He competed at the 1972 Summer Olympics in Munich, where he placed 39th in the men's individual archery event.
