= Tomasz Leżański =

Polish archer (born 1947)

Personal information
- Nationality: Polish
- Born: 14 May 1947 (age 78) Warsaw, Poland

Sport
- Sport: Archery

Tomasz Leżański (born 14 May 1947) is a Polish archer. He competed in the men's individual event at the 1972 Summer Olympics.
