= David Alkon =

Mexican sports shooter

Personal information
- Born: 21 April 1937 (age 89)

Sport
- Sport: Sports shooting

David Alkon (born 21 April 1937) is a Mexican former sports shooter. He competed in the trap event at the 1972 Summer Olympics.
