= Munster pilchard fishery 1570–1750 =

Former fishery in Ireland

The Munster pilchard fishery, from approximately 1570 to 1750, saw the fishing of pilchard (sardine) stocks along the South West coast of Ireland between Ardmore, County Waterford and Ballinskelligs, County Kerry. This was an important industry, with Baltimore, Dunmanus, Schull, Sherkin, Kinsale, Bantry, Whiddy Island as centres, together with outlying curing station called "Pallices" of which there were significant numbers along the Southern coast.

== Working of seine boats ==
Fish was caught by means of the seine net, which together with the curing at the fish pallices had been introduced by English settlers in the period. Two boats, the seine boat and the so-called "follower" were used. The seine boat, a large boat pulled by perhaps a dozen or more oars, carried the net, which was often 300–400 yards long. An experienced fisherman acted as a “huer” by directing fishing operations from suitable points of vantage. From high land, the huer could see the shoals of pilchards clearly, and he directed the "skipper" of the seine boat, by suitable signs to the location of a likely shoal. On a given signal, the net was shot around the shoal by the seine boat, and in the meantime, the free end of the net was picked up by the "follower", with a crew of perhaps five or six, and the two ends of the net were brought together. Weighted pieces of timber were placed to prevent the fish from escaping. The escaping footropes of the net were gradually drawn up until the fish were completely enclosed, and by means of baskets the fish were transferred from the net to the boat, and fishing continued until no more fish could be managed, or if catches were poor. The pilchards were preserved with salt in the "pallices" or occasionally smoked.

Whiddy Island was a major centre of the industry and Edward Davenant and his partner John Snelling were dominant players, having a 31-year lease from 1608, possibly from Owen O’Sullivan or his widow of Downaboy (Dunboy Castle, near Castletownbere) (POK). There is a reference to a consignment of pilchards bring take in 1623 in an English ship from Bantry to a French port in the Admiralty Court records in London.

== Decline of fishery ==
Bishop Dive Downes, visiting Bantry in 1699, referred to "a lack of pilchards". In an article by the Archbishop of Dublin in the 1726 Edition of Gerard Boate's A Natural History of Ireland, it was stated that prior to 1688 there was good fishing of pilchards in the South coast, but since the fight in Bantry Bay the pilchards have not been seen on the coast. There is however reference in 1735 by Mr. Jenkins, giving evidence before a Commission of the state of Irish fisheries. He had seen the books of Mr. Meade who was involved in the fisheries in Bantry Bay from 1730 to 1745, and exported enormous quantities of pilchards. Smith further says that before there were many creeks around Bantry, there were several fish pallices for saving, preserving and salting pilchards, which were sent to Spain, Portugal and Italy. He says that the Fishery generally began around the Feast of Saint James or the 1st day of July, and for the first three months they were large, fat and full of oyle, and were saved with difficulty, being darker and worse coloured than those taken in the Winter months, and less prized in foreign markets, notwithstanding they were afforded more profit, having a much greater quantity of oyle. The Fishery held until the end of the year; 600 barrels of these fish, having been enclosed together in one net. When the pilchards were cured they were known as "fumados". The Fishery would have given rights to great employment for coopers, carpenters, clerks in the overall area. This is substantiated by the reference in Frank O’Mahony’s book "Losses sustained by William Hull” arising from the raid on his fishery by natives of Kilcrohane in 1641. James Fontaine (Huguenot owner of fishery Beara) said that you couldn't enter the pilchard industry unless you had a large farm with many tenants on it obliged to fish for you. In Kenmare, statistical returns indicated that the value of the fishery in 1683/4 was only 10% of that of the mid-1630.
