= Jakob Wolfensberger =

Swiss archer (1933–2021)

Personal information
- Nationality: Swiss
- Born: 21 April 1933
- Died: 2 November 2021 (aged 88)

Sport
- Sport: Archery

Jakob Wolfensberger (21 April 1933 – 2 November 2021) was a Swiss archer. He competed in the men's individual event at the 1972 Summer Olympics.
