= Seiji Hibino =

Japanese archer (born 1950)

Personal information
- Nationality: Japanese
- Born: 27 September 1950 (age 74)

Sport
- Sport: Archery

Seiji Hibino (日比野正嗣, Hibino Seiji, born 27 September 1950) is a Japanese archer. He competed in the men's individual event at the 1972 Summer Olympics.
