= Fettah Güney =

Turkish sports shooter

Personal information
- Born: 21 May 1937 (age 89) Aydın, Turkey

Sport
- Sport: Sports shooting

Fettah Güney (born 21 May 1937) is a Turkish former sports shooter. He competed in the trap event at the 1972 Summer Olympics.
