= Grzegorz Strouhal =

Polish sports shooter

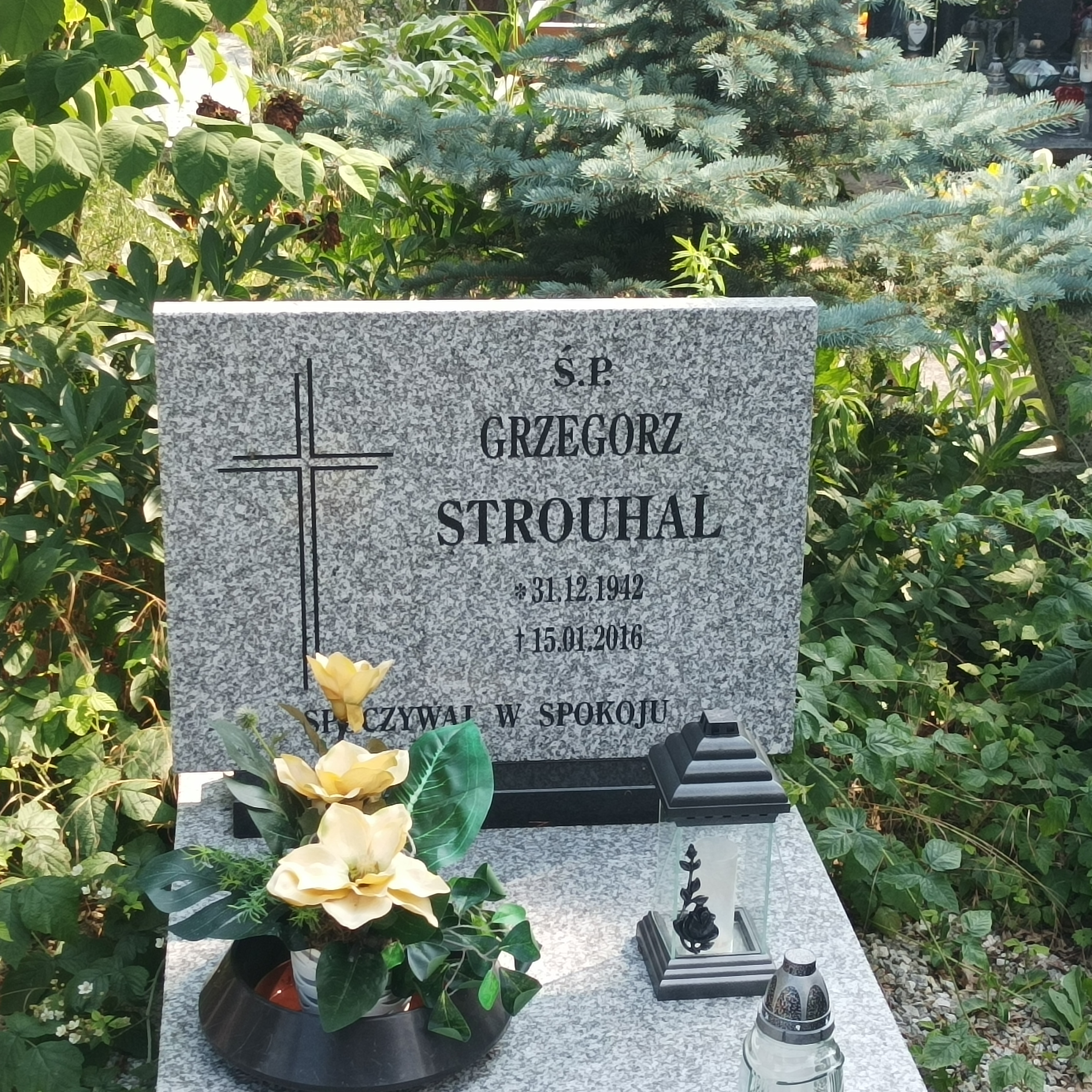
- The tomb of Grzegorz Strouhal at the Osobowicki Cemetery in Wrocław

Personal information
- Born: 31 December 1942 Kawno, Poland
- Died: 15 January 2016 (aged 73)

Sport
- Sport: Sports shooting

Grzegorz Strouhal (31 December 1942 – 15 January 2016) was a Polish sports shooter. He competed in the trap event at the 1972 Summer Olympics.
