= Michael Carr-Hartley =

Kenyan sport shooter

Personal information
- Born: 3 February 1942 (age 84)

Sport
- Sport: Sports shooting

Michael Carr-Hartley (born 3 February 1942) is a Kenyan former sports shooter and child actor. He competed at the 1972 Summer Olympics and the 1984 Summer Olympics. He had a brother, Brian, who was also an Olympian.

He was the son of trapper Thomas Carr Hartley, who caught wild animals for films and zoos. When young, Carr-Hartley was a child actor and starred in a television series, The Adventures of a Jungle Boy.
