= Mati Vaikjärv =

Estonian archer (born 1944)

Personal information
- Nationality: Estonian
- Born: 2 February 1944 (age 81); Tõstamaa, Reichskommissariat Ostland

Sport
- Sport: Archery

Mati Vaikjärv (born 2 February 1944) is an Estonian archer. He competed in the men's individual event at the 1972 Summer Olympics.
