= Egon Hansen (sport shooter) =

Danish sports shooter (1931–2002)

Personal information
- Full name: Egon Meldgaard Hansen
- Born: 13 April 1931 Skjern, Denmark
- Died: 30 December 2002 (aged 71)

Sport
- Sport: Sports shooting

Egon Meldgaard Hansen (13 April 1931 – 30 December 2002) was a Danish sports shooter. He competed in the trap event at the 1972 Summer Olympics. Hansen died on 30 December 2002, at the age of 71.
