= Olle Boström (archer) =

Swedish archer (1926–2010)

Personal information
- Nationality: Swedish
- Born: 31 March 1926; Forshaga, Sweden
- Died: 31 July 2010 (aged 84); Forshaga, Sweden

Sport
- Sport: Archery

Olle Boström (31 March 1926 – 31 July 2010) was a Swedish archer. He competed in the men's individual event at the 1972 Summer Olympics.
