= Jean-Pierre Héritier =

Swiss archer (born 1953)

Personal information
- Nationality: Swiss
- Born: 13 April 1953
- Died: 3 April 2020 (aged 66)

Sport
- Sport: Archery

Jean-Pierre Héritier (13 April 1953 – 3 April 2020) was a Swiss archer. He competed in the men's individual event at the 1972 Summer Olympics.
