= Túlio Miraglia =

Brazilian sports shooter

Personal information
- Born: 19 January 1930
- Died: 6 February 2003 (aged 73)

Sport
- Sport: Sports shooting

Túlio Miraglia (19 January 1930 – 6 February 2003) was a Brazilian sports shooter. He competed in the trap event at the 1972 Summer Olympics.
