= Heinz Leibinger =

German sports shooter

Personal information
- Born: 9 January 1941 (age 85) Reutlingen, Germany

Sport
- Country: Germany
- Sport: Sports shooting

Heinz Leibinger (born 9 January 1941) is a German former sports shooter. He competed in the trap event at the 1972 Summer Olympics for West Germany.
