= The Adventures of a Jungle Boy =

1957 British TV adventure series

- Genre: Adventure
- Directed by: George Breakston
- Country of origin: United Kingdom
- Original language: English
- No. of episodes: 13

Production
- Executive producers: Jack J. Gross; Philip N. Krasne
- Production location: Kenya
- Production company: Gross-Krasne Productions

Original release
- Release: 1957 – 1957

The Adventures of a Jungle Boy is a 1957 British syndicated adventure series. The show was known for its striking similarity to the Tarzan movie series.

== Plot ==
A young boy is the sole survivor of a plane crash in the African jungle. He is found and raised, along with his pet cheetah, by Dr. Laurence, a research scientist. The series portrays their efforts to protect the jungle from outside threats and to save the jungle inhabitants from danger.

== Cast and characters ==
- Michael Carr-Hartley as Boy
- Ronald Adam as Dr. Laurence

British actors guest starring in the series included Peter Dyneley, Patrick Holt, Conrad Phillips, David Oxley, Leonard Sachs, Robert Arden, Patricia Plunkett and Andrew Faulds.

Carr Hartley was the son of an animal-handler and performed all of the animal stunts himself. He later was part of "Carr-Hartley Safaris," a family business in Kenya.

== Episodes ==
1. "Meet Jungle Boy"
2. "Adoption Story"
3. "The Doctor Man"
4. "A Child By the River"
5. "Boy and the Reverend"
6. "The Journey Up River"
7. "Young Love"
8. "Doctor's Dilemma"
9. "Jungle Boy and the Diamonds"
10. "The Burial Ground"
11. "The Ways of a Witch Doctor"
12. "Kidnapped"
13. "Runaway Boy"
