= Juan Jorge Giha Sr. =

Peruvian sports shooter

Juan Jose Giha Ali
Personal information
- Born: 23 October 1922
- Died: 1999

Sport
- Sport: Sports shooting

Juan Jose Giha Ali (23 October 1922 – 1999) was a Peruvian sports shooter. He competed in the trap event at the 1972 Summer Olympics.
