= Rafel Aveleyra =

Mexican archer (born 1932)

Personal information
- Nationality: Mexican
- Born: 29 July 1932 (age 92)

Sport
- Sport: Archery

Rafel Aveleyra (born 29 July 1932) is a Mexican archer. He competed in the men's individual event at the 1972 Summer Olympics.
