= Ferdinand Vega =

Puerto Rican archer (1936–2021)

Personal information
- Nationality: Puerto Rican
- Born: 30 April 1936 Santurce Puerto Rico
- Died: 26 February 2021 (aged 84) Carolina Puerto Rico

Sport
- Sport: Archery

Ferdinand Vega (30 April 1936 – 26 February 2021) was a Puerto Rican archer. He competed in the men's individual event at the 1972 Summer Olympics. Vega served as Command Chief Master Sergeant in the Puerto Rico Air National Guard where he earned the Meritorious Service Medal, the Air Force Commendation Medal and the Puerto Rico Service Medal retiring in 1996. Vega died on 26 February 2021. He was buried at the Puerto Rico National Cemetery.
