= Vincenzo Lucchini =

Swiss sports shooter

Personal information
- Born: 9 January 1925
- Died: 21 November 1984 (aged 59)

Sport
- Sport: Sports shooting

Vincenzo Lucchini (9 January 1925 – 21 November 1984) was a Swiss sports shooter. He competed in the trap event at the 1972 Summer Olympics.
