= Manfred Geisler (sport shooter) =

German sport shooter

Personal information
- Born: 31 July 1949 (age 77) Grimmen, Germany

Sport
- Sport: Sports shooting

Manfred Geisler (born 31 July 1949) is a German former sports shooter. He competed in the trap event at the 1972 Summer Olympics for East Germany.
