= Emilio Ramos =

Spanish archer (born 1935)

Personal information
- Nationality: Spanish
- Born: 25 April 1935 (age 89)

Sport
- Sport: Archery

Emilio Ramos (born 25 April 1935) is a Spanish archer. He competed in the men's individual event at the 1972 Summer Olympics.
