= Joseph Mesmar =

Syrian sports shooter

Personal information
- Born: 25 November 1921 Aleppo, Syria

Sport
- Sport: Sports shooting

Joseph Mesmar (Arabic: جوزيف مسمار; born 25 November 1921) is a Syrian former sports shooter. He competed in the trap event at the 1972 Summer Olympics.
