= Elmer Ewert =

Canadian archer (born 1934)

Personal information
- Born: 19 September 1934 (age 92) St. Catharines, Ontario, Canada

Sport
- Sport: Archery

Elmer Ewert (born 19 September 1934) is a Canadian archer. He competed in the men's individual event at the 1972 Summer Olympics.
