= Galsangiin Byambaa =

Mongolian archer (born 1938)

Personal information
- Nationality: Mongolian
- Born: 1 May 1938 (age 86)

Sport
- Sport: Archery

Galsangiin Byambaa (born 1 May 1938) is a Mongolian archer. He competed in the men's individual event at the 1972 Summer Olympics.
