= Economic history of Ireland =

Ireland's economic history starts at the end of the Ice Age when the first humans arrived there. Agriculture then came around 4500 BC. Iron technology came with the Celts around 350 BC. From the 12th century to the 1970s, most Irish exports went to England. During this period, Ireland's main exports were foodstuffs. In the 20th century, Ireland's economy diversified and grew. It is now one of the richest countries in the world by GDP per capita.

== To 1700 ==
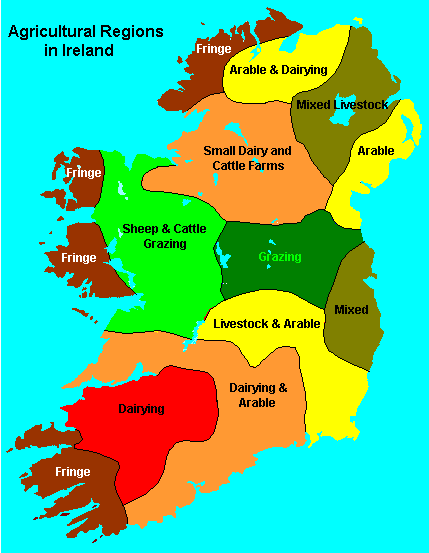
Traditional land use in Ireland

The first settlers in Ireland were seafarers who survived largely by fishing, hunting and gathering. This was the extent of the Irish economy for around 3500 years – until 4500BC when farming and pottery making became widespread. Sheep, goats, cattle and cereals were imported from Britain and Europe. Wheat and barley were the principal crops cultivated. There was an economic collapse around 2500BC and the population declined from its peak of around 100,000. Metalworking began in Ireland around 2500 BC, with bronze being the principal metal used. Swords, axes, daggers, hatchets, halberds, awls, drinking utensils and horn-shaped trumpets were produced in the period 2500BC – 700BC (the Bronze Age). Mining began also around this time. Mines in Cork and Kerry are believed to have produced as much as 370 tonnes of copper during the Bronze Age. The Celts brought iron technology to Ireland around 350 BC. They established kingdoms and a system of rule, which enabled the economy to be regulated for the first time.

In the 12th century, Ireland was invaded by the Normans. During these times, the economy was predominantly one based on subsistence farming, mainly oats and potatoes (after the 16th century) and other forms of tillage. An important industry developed on the south coast involving catching, processing and exporting pilchards (see Munster pilchard fishery 1570-1750).

== 18th century ==
The major change in the 18th century was the large amount of infrastructural development of Ireland; turnpike roads were established by the Parliament of Ireland from 1734. From 1756 the Grand Canal was built from Dublin towards the Shannon; the Ulster Canal (1783) and the Royal Canal (1790) followed. The "Money Bill dispute" of 1753 revealed a tax surplus that was maintained until the 1790s.

In the 18th century English trade with Ireland was the most important branch of English overseas trade^{1}. Absentee landlords drew off some £800,000 p.a. in farm rents in the early part of the century, rising to £1 million, in an economy that amounted to about £4 million. Completely deforested for timber exports and a temporary iron industry in the course of the 17th century, Irish estates turned to the export of salt beef and pork and butter and hard cheese through the slaughterhouse and port city of Cork, which supplied England, the Royal Navy and the sugar colonies of the West Indies. The bishop of Cloyne wondered "how a foreigner could possibly conceive that half the inhabitants are dying of hunger in a country so abundant in foodstuffs?"^{2}. The weather-related famine of 1740–41 caused the death of a third of the population in some areas. Despite this, the population increased from about 2.5 million in 1700 to 5 million in 1800.

Irish trade was stifled by the Navigation Acts which limited Irish exports. These were repealed in 1779 due to pressure from the Irish Patriot Party, and fostered a brief boom in the 1780s. Under pressure from salted meat exported from the Baltic and from the United States, the Anglo-Irish landowners rapidly switched to growing grain for export, while most Irish ate potatoes and groats. The Royal Exchange was built in 1779, and in 1781 a new Custom House was started.

== 19th century ==
The 19th century quickly saw the merger of the Kingdom of Ireland into the Kingdom of Great Britain, to create the United Kingdom of Great Britain and Ireland with effect from 1 January 1801. This had wide-reaching consequences, especially when the expectation of Roman Catholic Emancipation took longer to emerge than had been foreseen, leaving Ireland chiefly represented by the Anglo-Irish and the Ulster Scots in the combined parliament sitting at Westminster.

For much of the 19th century, the only factories in Ireland were the textile mills of the north, the Guinness brewery, and the Jacob's biscuit factory in Dublin. For much of the period, the Irish economy provided cheap raw materials such as timber, beef, vegetables, and marble to the far more industrialised British economy. Ireland underwent major highs and lows economically during the 19th century: from economic booms during the Napoleonic Wars and in the late 20th century (when it experienced a surge in economic growth unmatched until the 'Celtic Tiger' boom of the 1990s), to severe economic downturns and a series of famines, the latest threatening in 1879. The worst of these was the Great Famine of 1845–1852, in which about 1,000,000 people died and another million had no option but to emigrate, with millions more leaving in the following decades.

During the international Post-Napoleonic depression (1815–1821) following the conclusion of the Coalition Wars (1792–1815), wheat and other grain prices fell by half in Ireland, and alongside continued population growth, landlords converted cropland into rangeland by securing the passage of tenant farmer eviction legislation in 1816, which led, because of the Irish workforce's historic concentration in agriculture, to a greater subdivision of remaining land plots and increasingly less efficient and less profitable subsistence farms.

Ireland's economic problems were in part the result of the small size of Irish landholdings. In particular, both the law and social tradition provided for subdivision of land, with all sons inheriting equal shares in a farm, meaning that farms became so small that only one crop, potatoes, could be grown in sufficient amounts to feed a family. Furthermore, many estates, from whom the small farmers rented, were poorly run by absentee landlords and in many cases heavily mortgaged.

When potato blight hit the island in 1845, much of the rural population was unable to access the remaining food – wheat, livestock etc. which was due to export to Britain. At this time British politicians such as the Prime Minister Robert Peel were wedded to a strict laissez-faire economic policy, which argued against state intervention of any sort. While some money was raised by private individuals and charities (Native Americans sent supplies, while Queen Victoria personally donated £1,000) British government inaction (or at least inadequate action) led to a problem becoming a catastrophe; the class of cottiers or farm labourers was virtually wiped out.

The famine spawned the second mass wave of Irish immigration to the United States, the first having been the migrations of the 18th century. There was also a large amount of emigration to England, Scotland, Canada, and Australia. This had the long term consequence of creating a large and influential Irish diaspora, particularly in the United States, who supported and financed different Irish independence movements, beginning with the Irish Republican Brotherhood. From 1879 a "Land War" developed, and by 1903 many farmers were able to buy their land, but usually chose small and uneconomic lots.

In east Ulster the Industrial Revolution led to rapid urbanization. Belfast grew from a population of 7,000 in 1800 to 400,000 in 1900, having outgrown Dublin, the former capital.

In the 1890s, the Irish agricultural cooperative movement flourished, with bodies such as the Irish Agricultural Organisation Society becoming important elements of the economy. Cooperatives greatly increased the productivity of Irish agriculture, especially in the dairy sector, while also playing a part in the growth of Irish nationalism.

A 2022 study, using a newly constructed dataset on Irish industrial output, found, "Irish industrial output grew by an average of 1.3 per cent per annum between 1800 and the outbreak of the First World War... While Ireland did not experience absolute deindustrialisation either before the Famine or afterwards, its industrial growth was disappointing when considered in a comparative perspective."

== History since partition ==
After the War of Independence, most of Ireland gained independence from the United Kingdom. Twenty-six counties of Ireland became the Irish Free State, later described as the Republic of Ireland, while the other six remained in the Union as Northern Ireland. There had already been a significant economic divide between these two parts of Ireland, but following partition both regions further diverged, with Belfast, as the North's economic centre, and Dublin becoming the capital of the Free State. Partition had a devastating effect on what became Ireland's border area. County Donegal for example was economically separated from its natural regional economic centre of Derry. The rail network struggled to operate across two economic areas, finally closing across a vast swath of Ireland's border area (the only cross-border route left being that between Belfast and Dublin). The last remaining cross-border line (Belfast-Dublin) could not have operated after 1953 without government support.

Both parts of Ireland in effect used pound sterling (to which the Irish pound was pegged) until 1979 (when the peg was removed). As a result, both parts also shared in any inflation or deflation in the value of sterling, with interests rates being determined in London. The continuing link to sterling from 1922 to 1979 underlines how much the economy of the south depended upon exports to (and remittances from) Britain, even though it was politically independent.

In general the economy of the Republic was much weaker than that of the North throughout the 20th century, being based on agriculture; and much of that also being based on uneconomically small farms. Protectionism was introduced by Seán Lemass in 1932 and the economy became isolated. From 1945 to 1960 Ireland missed out on the European economic boom across Europe, and 500,000 people emigrated. A major policy change followed the issue of TK Whitaker's economic model in 1958, and the Republic slowly embraced the industrial world. Most Irish exports continued to go to Britain until 1969. Lemass reversed his policies in 1959 and the economy started to grow.

According to economic historian Kevin O’Rourke, the Irish economy remained underdeveloped for extended periods of time due to its excessive dependence on an underperforming British economy. He argues that European integration, which reduced dependence on the UK, substantially improved the Irish economy.

Meanwhile, the main northern industries based on shipbuilding, ropes, shirts and textiles declined from 1960, and then more so due to the 1970s 'Troubles' in Northern Ireland, despite government investment in projects such as the Belfast DeLorean plant. In 2005 the northern economy was supported by a net annual "subvention" from London of £5 billion, an amount that has risen over time.

Conversely, after a bleak period in the 1970s and 1980s, the Celtic Tiger era in the Republic was spurred on by the high technology industries that took root in the country in the mid-1990s. The southern economy also benefited relatively more after 1973 up to 2002 from the European Structural Funds system. It grew markedly until 2007, but no corrective measures were taken to control the process, leading to the 2008 crisis.

However, since 2014, the Republic of Ireland has seen large economic growth, referred to as the "Celtic Phoenix".

== See also ==
- Economy of the Republic of Ireland

== Footnotes ==
1. See: Braudel, F, 1979. (Page Number Needed)
2. See: Plumb, J.H., 1973. (Page Number Needed)

== Sources ==
- Braudel, Fernand, The Perspective of the World, vol III of Civilization and Capitalism (1979, in English 1985)
- Plumb, J.H., England in the 18th Century, 1973: "The Irish Empire"
