= Robin Sampson =

New Zealand archer (1940–2024)

Personal information
- Full name: Robin David Sampson
- Nationality: New Zealander
- Born: 23 November 1940 Bulawayo, Southern Rhodesia
- Died: 16 August 2024 (aged 83) Gisborne, New Zealand
- Height: 1.83 m (6 ft 0 in)

Sport
- Country: New Zealand
- Sport: Archery
- Club: Richmondvale Archery Club

Achievements and titles
- National finals: Open champion (1971, 1972); Clout champion (1971); Freestyle field champion (1972)

Robin David Sampson (23 November 1940 – 16 August 2024) was a New Zealand archer who represented his country in the men's individual event at the 1972 Summer Olympics in Munich. He was the first New Zealand archer to compete at an Olympic Games.

== Biography ==
Born in Bulawayo, Southern Rhodesia (now Zimbabwe) on 23 November 1940, Sampson later migrated to New Zealand. He settled in Hastings, where he found work with the Post Office. He became a naturalised New Zealand citizen in May 1972, less than three months before the start of the Munich Olympics.

Sampson was a member of the Richmondvale Archery Club. He came to national attention at the 1969 New Zealand national archery championships in Whangārei, where he was one of seven competitors to score over 1000 points in the FITA round and earn an international gold star. At those championships, he also finished equal second in the men's clout.

Sampson entered the 1971 national championships in Auckland as one of only two New Zealand archers to have attained the 1100 gold star award, and the reigning East Coast, Bay of Plenty and North Island archery champion, and went on to win the men's open title. He also won the men's clout, with a championship record 308 points, breaking the previous tournament record by 14 points. The following month, he won the Wellington men's archery title, with a score of 1105, 6 short of the New Zealand record.

At the 1972 national championships held at Lincoln, Sampson successfully defended his national open title. He also won the men's freestyle field championship, but did not retain the men's clout title.

The qualifying standard for the 1972 Summer Olympics was four scores of 1100 or more, which Sampson achieved with scores of 1125, 1136, 1152 and 1155. The New Zealand Archery Association (NZAA) also required two rounds over 1160 at the New Zealand Olympic trials, and Sampson gained totals of 1179 and 1228, respectively. He was subsequently nominated by the NZAA, and his selection was confirmed by the New Zealand Olympic and Commonwealth Games Association.

Sampson became the first New Zealander to compete in archery at an Olympic Games. On the first day of competition in the men's individual event at Munich, he reportedly suffered badly from nerves, scoring 235 out of a possible 360 points in the opening 90-metre rounds, well below the totals that he had been posting in practice. He eventually finished the tournament in 53rd place, out of 55 competitors.

Sampson died in Gisborne on 16 August 2024, at the age of 83.
