= Shinji Nakamoto =

Japanese archer (born 1945)

Personal information
- Nationality: Japanese
- Born: 8 July 1945 (age 79)

Sport
- Sport: Archery

Shinji Nakamoto (中本新二, Nakamoto Shinji, born 8 July 1945) is a Japanese archer. He competed in the men's individual event at the 1972 Summer Olympics.
