= Jacques Doyen =

French archer (born 1943)

Personal information
- Nationality: French
- Born: 21 August 1943 (age 81)

Sport
- Sport: Archery

Jacques Doyen (born 21 August 1943) is a French archer. He competed in the men's individual event at the 1972 Summer Olympics.
