= Herluf Andersen =

Danish archer (1931–2013)

Personal information
- Full name: Herluf Juhl Andersen
- Nationality: Danish
- Born: 25 December 1931 Viborg, Denmark
- Died: 30 January 2013 (aged 81)
- Height: 177 cm (5 ft 10 in)

Sport
- Sport: Archery

Herluf Juhl Andersen (25 December 1931 – 30 January 2013) was a Danish archer. He competed in the men's individual event at the 1972 Summer Olympics.
