= Alain Hermitte =

French swimmer

Personal information
- Born: 27 May 1949 (age 77)

Sport
- Sport: Swimming

Alain Hermitte (born 27 May 1949) is a French former freestyle swimmer. He competed in two events at the 1972 Summer Olympics.
