= Henri Laurila =

Finnish ice hockey player

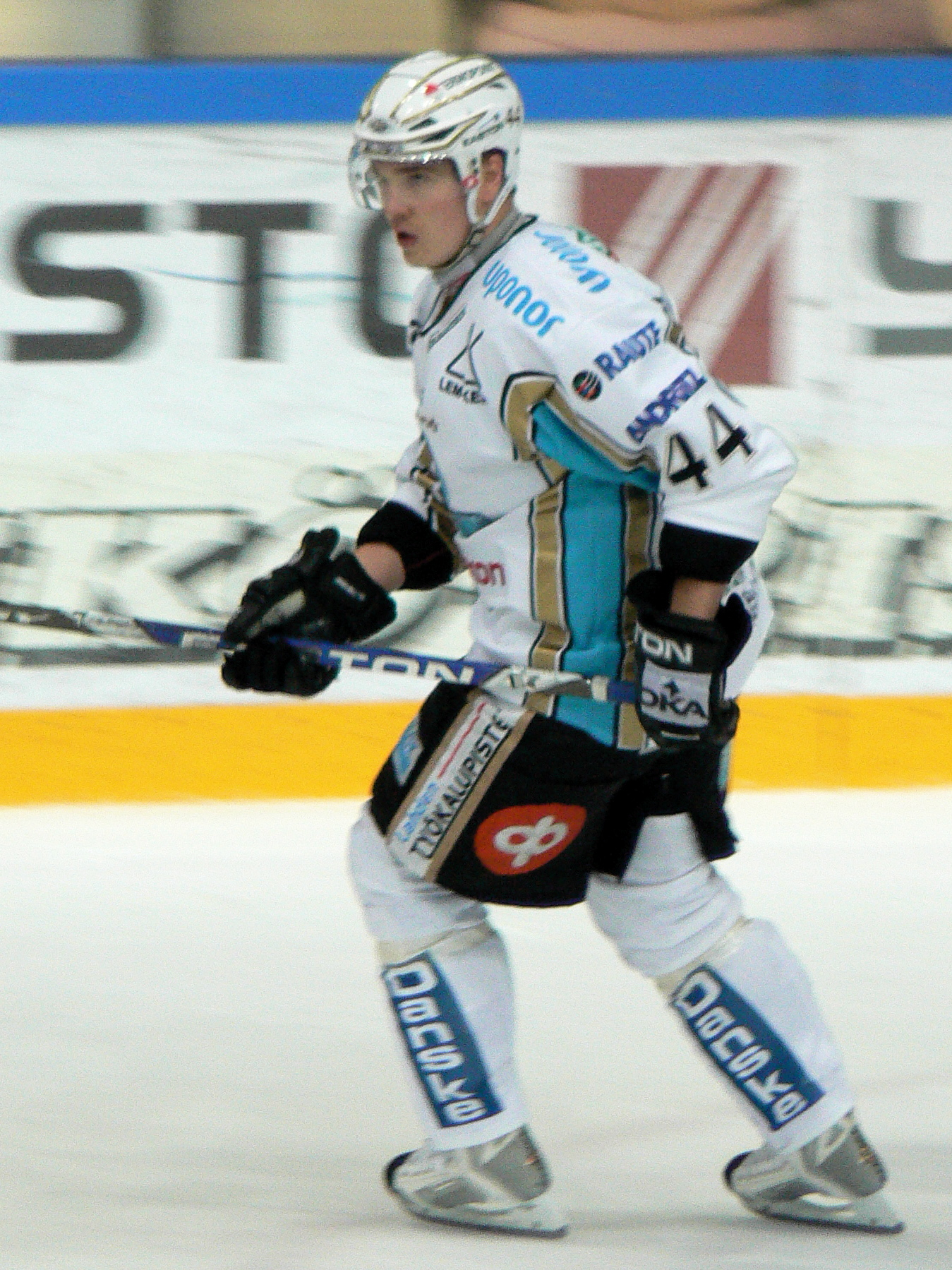
- Born: 1 March 1980 (age 45); Lahti, Finland
- Height: 6 ft 1 in (185 cm)
- Weight: 216 lb (98 kg; 15 st 6 lb)
- Position: Defence
- Shot: Right
- SM-liiga team: KalPa
- Playing career: 2000–2016

Henri Laurila is a Finnish professional ice hockey defenceman who currently plays for Rote Teufel Bad Nauheim of the German DEL2.

== Career statistics ==
			Regular season					Playoffs
Season	Team	League	GP	G	A	Pts	PIM	GP	G	A	Pts	PIM
1995–96	Kiekkoreipas U16	U16 SM-sarja	12	0	3	3	4	—	—	—	—	—
1996–97	Kiekkoreipas U18	U18 SM-sarja	28	6	3	9	10	—	—	—	—	—
1997–98	Kiekkoreipas U18	U18 SM-sarja	30	4	3	7	28	—	—	—	—	—
1998–99	Pelicans U20	U20 I-divisioona	36	11	17	28	74	—	—	—	—	—
1999–00	Pelicans U20	U20 I-divisioona	13	3	4	7	22	18	7	8	15	26
2000–01	Pelicans U20	U20 SM-liiga	12	5	3	8	10	—	—	—	—	—
2000–01	Lahti Pelicans	SM-liiga	42	1	1	2	14	3	0	0	0	2
2001–02	Lahti Pelicans	SM-liiga	39	0	4	4	10	4	0	0	0	0
2002–03	Lahti Pelicans	SM-liiga	46	4	5	9	32	—	—	—	—	—
2003–04	Ilves	SM-liiga	53	5	2	7	42	7	0	0	0	0
2004–05	Ilves	SM-liiga	52	1	5	6	32	7	0	0	0	2
2005–06	HC Asiago	Italy	43	3	7	10	32	—	—	—	—	—
2006–07	HC Fassa Falcons	Italy	30	6	8	14	92	5	0	1	1	18
2007–08	Lahti Pelicans	SM-liiga	55	11	6	17	87	6	1	0	1	2
2008–09	Lahti Pelicans	SM-liiga	57	4	11	15	64	10	1	4	5	6
2009–10	Lahti Pelicans	SM-liiga	13	1	2	3	12	—	—	—	—	—
2009–10	HeKi	Mestis	2	0	0	0	0	—	—	—	—	—
2009–10	Modo Hockey	Elitserien	9	2	0	2	6	—	—	—	—	—
2010–11	KalPa	SM-liiga	39	3	5	8	92	5	0	1	1	18
2011–12	KalPa	SM-liiga	37	6	10	16	51	7	0	2	2	4
2012–13	Espoo Blues	SM-liiga	55	6	17	23	61	—	—	—	—	—
2013–14	Lahti Pelicans	Liiga	47	6	12	18	22	3	0	0	0	2
2014–15	Lahti Pelicans	Liiga	45	2	11	13	26	—	—	—	—	—
2015–16	EC Bad Nauheim	DEL2	42	10	20	30	38	3	0	0	0	4
SM-liiga totals			580	50	91	141	545	52	2	7	9	36
