= Gilles Vigne =

French swimmer

Personal information
- Nationality: French
- Born: 14 March 1950 (age 76) Manosque, France

Sport
- Sport: Swimming
- Club: ASPTT Paris

Gilles Vigne (born 14 March 1950) is a French former freestyle swimmer. He competed in two events at the 1972 Summer Olympics.
