= Alain Convard =

French archer (born 1947)

Personal information
- Nationality: French
- Born: 16 January 1947
- Died: 6 August 1974

Sport
- Sport: Archery

Alain Convard (born 16 January 1947) is a French archer. He competed in the men's individual event at the 1972 Summer Olympics.

On 6 August 1974, Convard died in a motorcycle accident in Houdemont.
