= Jean Baumann =

French sports shooter

Personal information
- Born: 31 May 1934 (age 92)

Sport
- Sport: Sports shooting

Jean Baumann (born 31 May 1934) is a French former sports shooter. He competed at the 1972 Summer Olympics and the 1976 Summer Olympics.
