= Kim Nam-gu =

South Korean sports shooter

Personal information
- Born: 8 October 1923
- Died: 25 September 2013 (aged 89)

Sport
- Sport: Sports shooting

Korean name
- Hangul: 김남구
- Hanja: 金南九
- RR: Gim Namgu
- MR: Kim Namgu

Kim Nam-gu (8 October 1923 – 25 September 2013) was a South Korean sports shooter. He competed in the trap event at the 1972 Summer Olympics.
