= Fort Snelling (disambiguation) =

Fort Snelling is a historic military fortification the U.S. state of Minnesota.

Fort Snelling may also refer to:

== Places ==
- Fort Snelling (unorganized territory), Minnesota
- Fort Snelling National Cemetery
- Fort Snelling State Park
- Fort Snelling station

== Ships ==
- USS Fort Snelling, several ships of the United States Navy
