= André Baeyens =

Belgian archer (born 1946)

Andre Baeyens
Personal information
- Born: 29 September 1946 (age 78); Erondegem, East Flanders, Belgium

Sport
- Sport: Archery

André Baeyens (born 29 September 1946) is a former Belgian male archer. He competed at the 1972 Summer Olympics representing Belgium.
