= Henry Hunt Snelling =

American journalist

- Born: November 8, 1817; Plattsburgh, NY
- Died: June 24, 1897 (aged 79); St. Louis, MO
- Occupations: Photographer, editor, author, inventor
- Spouse: Anna L. Putnam

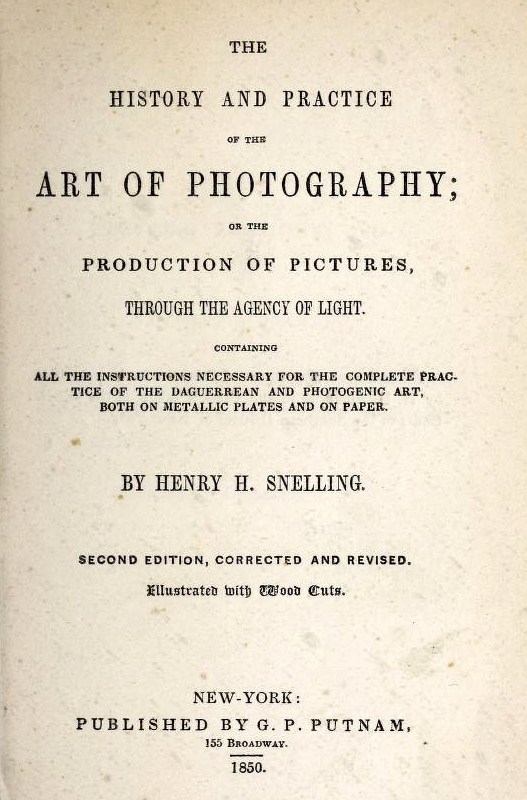
The history and practice of the art of photography (1850)

Henry Hunt Snelling (8 November 1817 – 24 June 1897) was a 19th-century American photographer, editor, author and inventor.

== Biography ==
Born in Plattsburgh, New York, Snelling was a son of Col. Josiah Snelling and Abigail (Hunt) Snelling. During Henry's infancy, the Snellings moved to the confluence of the Mississippi and Minnesota (then St. Peter's) rivers to build the U. S. Army fort that even today bears his father's name. Henry was educated at a military academy in Georgetown, DC. For a time he was the librarian of the New York Lyceum, In New York, he met Edward Anthony, from whom he learned about photography. Anthony was a manufacturer of photographic supplies, and Snelling came to work for him. In 1849 he wrote The History and Practice of the Art of Photography, which was published by his brother-in-law. This is supposedly the first bound volume on photography published in America. He also edited the Photographic Art Journal (1851–53 and 1854–60). This was later renamed the Photographic and Fine Art Journal. The firm E. and H.T. Anthony exhausted him, and he left in 1857. He sold the Photographic and Fine Art Journal. In 1871 he moved to Cornwall, New York, where he edited and published the newspaper, Reflector of Cornwall. In 1887 he had to leave that publication because he had become blind.

Snelling married Anna L. Putnam in 1837. She was the sister of George Palmer Putnam and herself an author (Kabaosa; or, The Warriors of the West). Snelling and his wife authored plays together. Additionally, Anna translated de Brebisson's The Collodion Process in Photography for the Production of Instantaneous Proofs. Snelling died at the Memorial Home, St. Louis, 24 Jun 1897.

Snelling was also known as an inventor. He invented an enlarging camera (1852), a blue glass filter, and announced, but did not develop, a color photographic process (1856).

== Works ==
- History and Practice of Photography (1849)
- Dictionary of the Photographic Art (1853)
