= Manuel Valdes (sport shooter) =

Filipino sport shooter

Personal information
- Born: 24 February 1956 (age 70)

Sport
- Sport: Sports shooting

Manuel Vicente "Joey" Versoza Valdes III (born 24 February 1956) is a Filipino former sports shooter. He competed in the trap event at the 1972 Summer Olympics.
