= Carlos Santos (archer) =

Filipino archer

Personal information
- Nationality: Filipino
- Born: January 1, 1940 (age 86)
- Height: 5 ft 7 in (171 cm)

Sport
- Sport: Archery

Carlos Santos (born January 1, 1940) is a Filipino archer. He competed in the men's individual event at the 1972 Summer Olympics.
