= Pierre Caland =

French swimmer

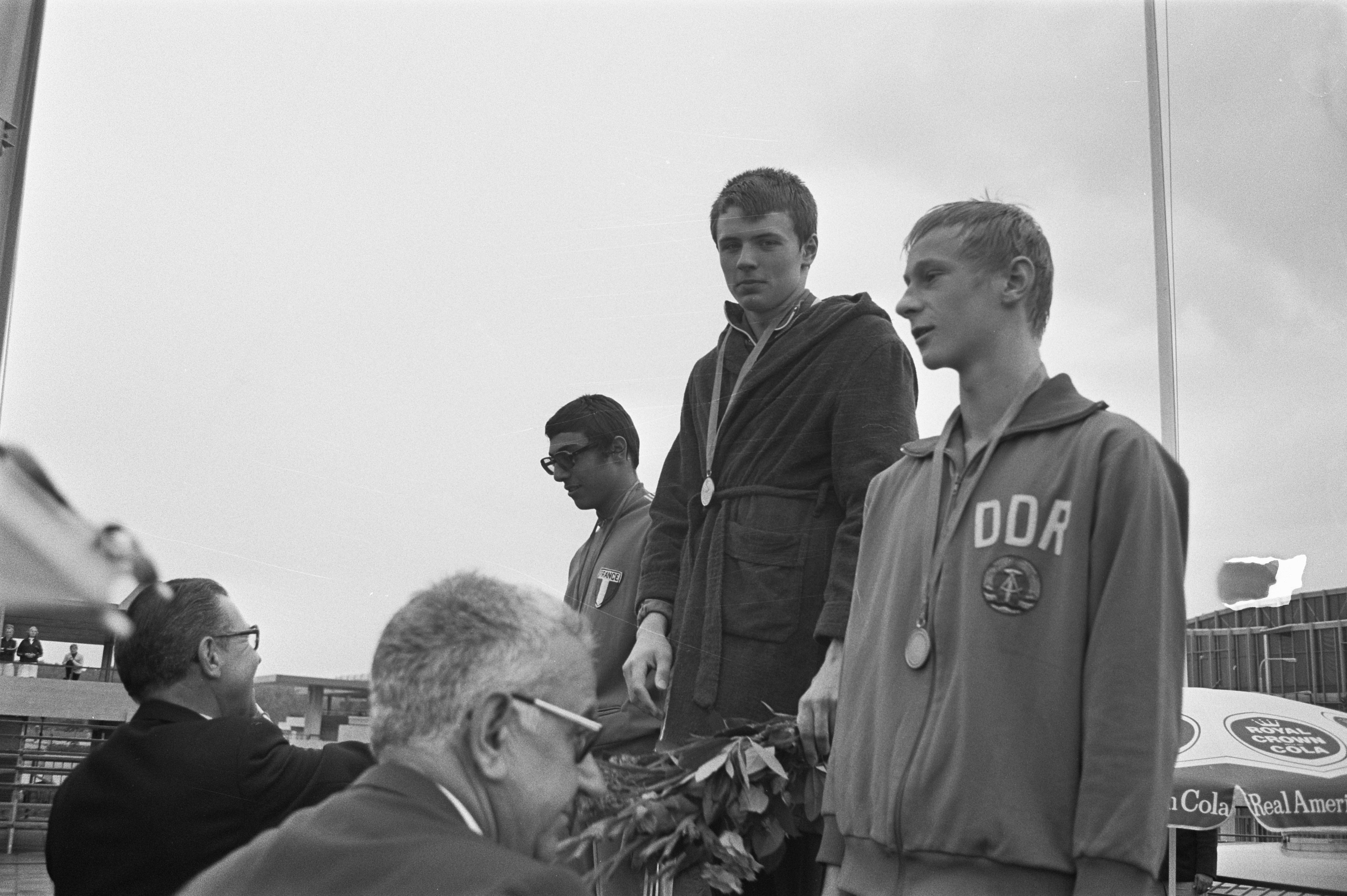
- Pierre Caland (left) at the 1971 European Junior Swimming Championships

Personal information
- Born: 10 September 1956 (age 69)

Sport
- Sport: Swimming

Pierre Caland (born 10 September 1956) is a French former freestyle swimmer. He competed in two events at the 1972 Summer Olympics.

He won the 100 meter freestyle silver medal at the 1971 European Junior Swimming Championships.
