= Josiah Snelling =

American soldier (1782–1828)

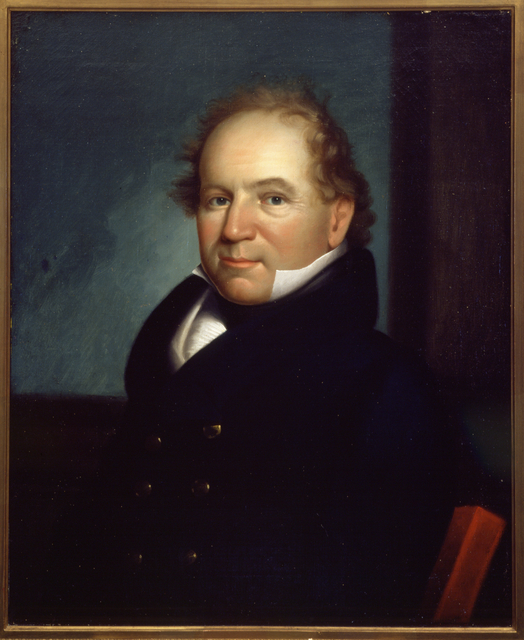
- Colonel Josiah Snelling, c. 1818
- Born: 1782; Boston, Massachusetts
- Died: August 20, 1828; Washington, D.C.
- Military career
- Allegiance: United States of America
- Branch: United States Army
- Service years: 1803–1828
- Rank: Colonel
- Known for: Fort Snelling
- Conflicts: Battle of Tippecanoe, War of 1812

Josiah Snelling (1782 – 20 August 1828) was the first commander of Fort Snelling, a fort located at the confluence of the Mississippi and Minnesota rivers in Minnesota. He was responsible for the initial design and construction of the fort, and he commanded it from 1820 through 1827.

== Life and career ==
Snelling, born in 1782 on Salem Street in Boston's North End, was the son of a well-to-do baker. He started his military career in 1803 by enlisting as a sergeant in the Massachusetts militia. In 1808, he joined the 4th Infantry Regiment of the U.S. Army as a first lieutenant and rose to the rank of captain by 1809. In 1811, Snelling led his company in a charge against Tecumseh's Indian Confederation at the Battle of Tippecanoe that helped ensure a victory for General William Henry Harrison. Afterwards, Snelling was recognized for his performance in a letter reporting on the battle by Harrison himself.

He was assigned to command Fort Harrison during the winter of 1811–12 on the Wabash River at the present site of Terre Haute, Indiana. During the War of 1812, he participated in the Battle of Brownstown, where he was promoted to major in recognition for distinguished service, and then went to Fort Detroit. After the size of the army was reduced in 1815, Snelling spent about four years on the northern border of New York as a lieutenant colonel with the Sixth Infantry before moving again to St. Louis, Missouri.

In June 1819, Snelling was promoted to colonel of the Fifth Infantry Regiment and sent to oversee the construction of a permanent headquarters at Fort St. Anthony.

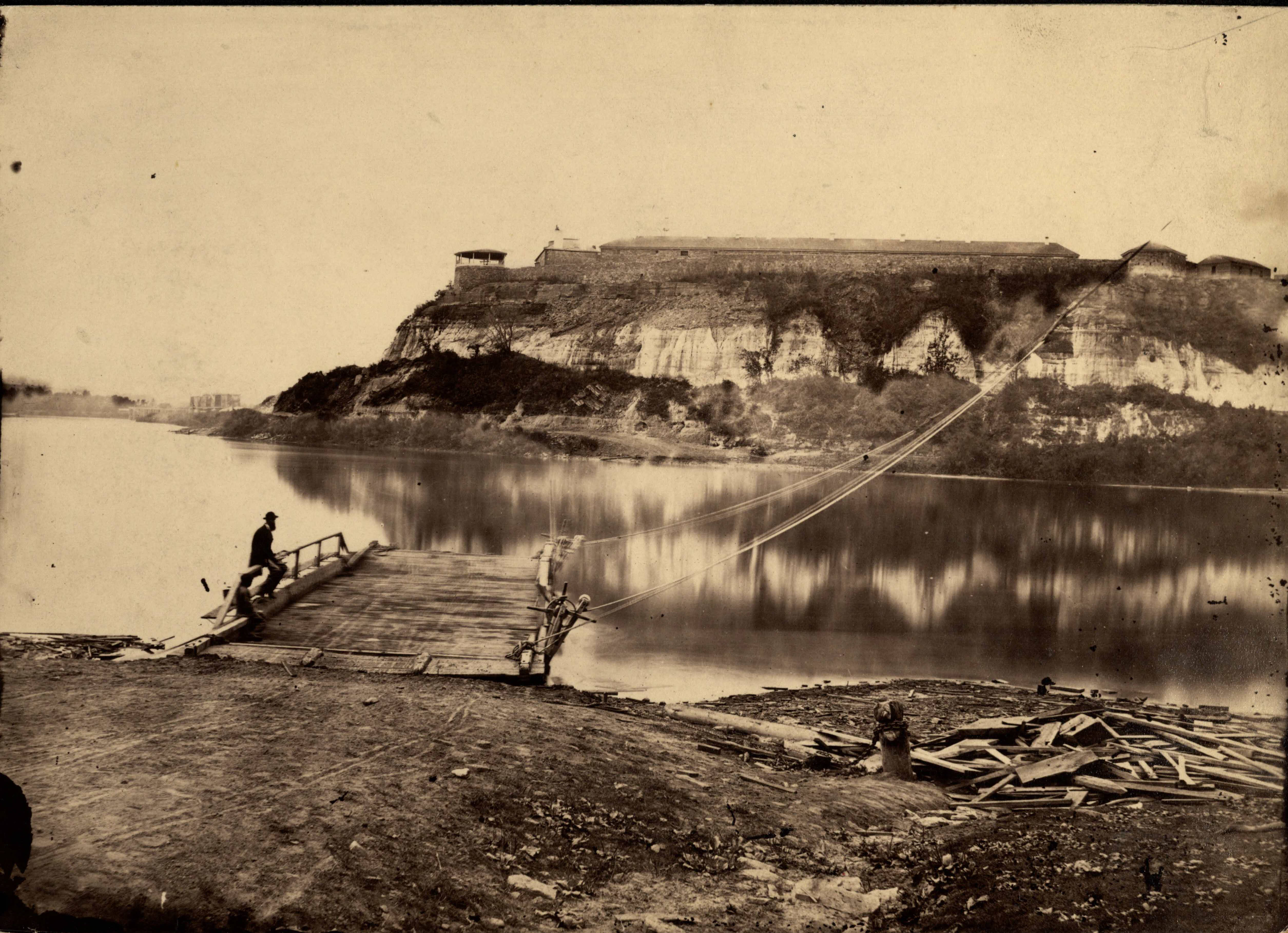
Fort Snelling from the ferry landing across the Mississippi River

=== Fort Snelling ===
Lieutenant Colonel Henry Leavenworth was originally chosen to locate the fortification at the mouth of the St. Peter's River (the prior name of the Minnesota River) in 1819. His expedition started out in Green Bay, Wisconsin, in May 1819, ascending the Fox River, then portaging to the Wisconsin River and following it downstream to its confluence with the Mississippi River at Prairie du Chien, Wisconsin. He remained at Fort Crawford with his soldiers until supplies arrived in August, 1819, and then the expedition traveled upriver to the confluence with the St. Peter's River. His soldiers originally built a temporary winter settlement, known as Cantonment New Hope, two miles (3 km) up the St. Peter's River from the confluence. The next spring, in anticipation of flooding, he moved the troops to higher ground at a site known as Camp Coldwater, a mile up the Mississippi from the confluence of the rivers. Leavenworth was later relieved of his duty in August 1820 and succeeded by Colonel Josiah Snelling.

Snelling traveled upriver from St. Louis and arrived at the cantonment on September 5, 1820, and immediately started the relocation and design of the new fort. Snelling located the fort on a bluff above the river junction, and with the aid of engineer Lieutenant Robert McCabe, designed the fort as an elongated diamond. The western point of the diamond had a large round tower, about thirty feet high and thirty feet in diameter, with musket ports in the sides and a cannon on the top. The eastern point of the diamond was designed with a half-moon battery. Two smaller batteries on the north and south sides were built for infantry and cannon. Eight interior buildings of the fort were built from locally quarried limestone, while two other buildings were built from white pine, cut from around the Rum River area. The fort had no formal architect. All of the manpower of designing and building the fort came from Snelling's own troops.

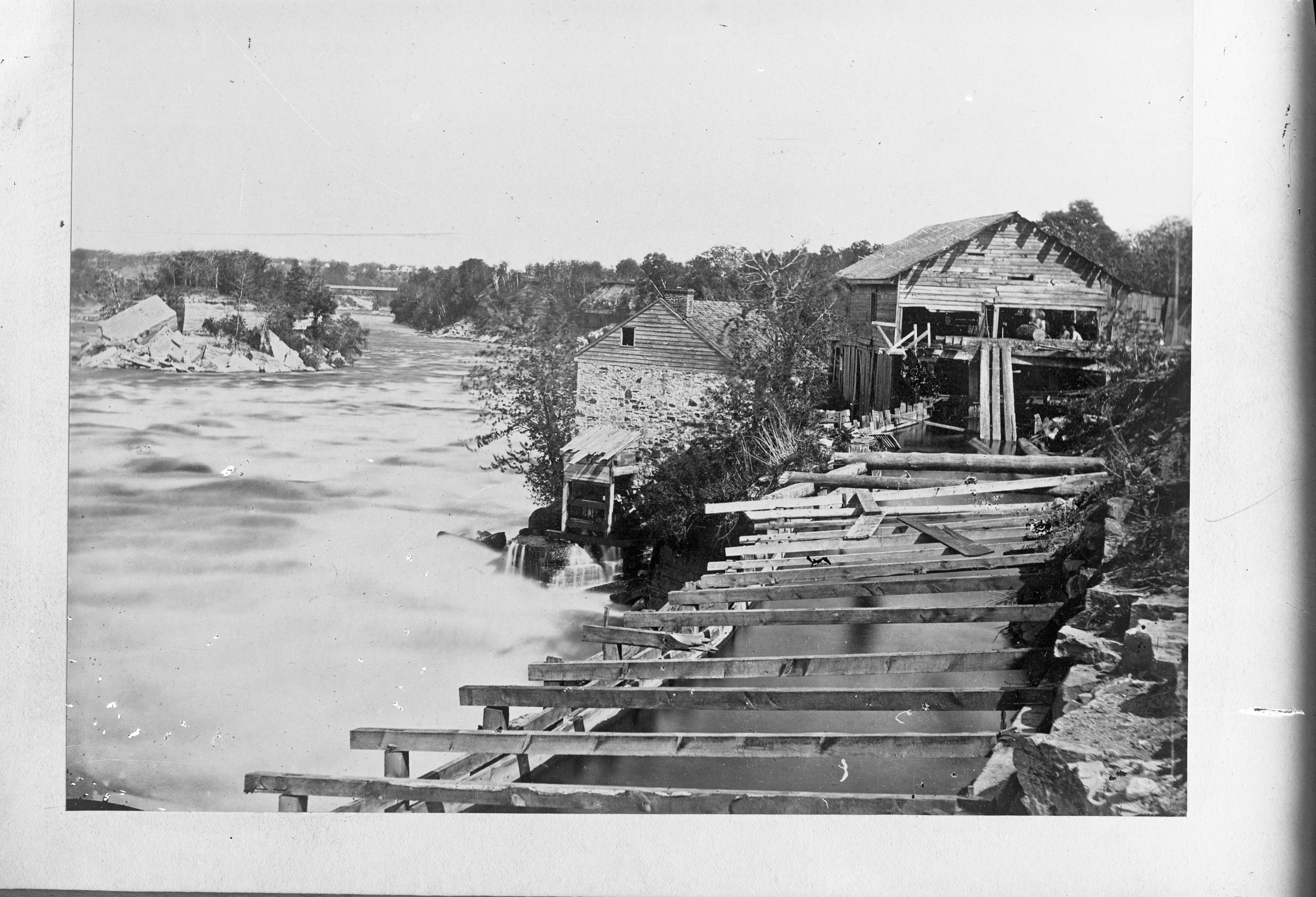
Mills built in 1822 at St. Anthony Falls by soldiers from Fort Snelling

The Army, recognizing the importance of fresh fruit and vegetables in a soldier's diet, made post commanders responsible for establishing gardens. Colonel Snelling started cultivation in 1820, planting corn and potatoes in about 90 acres (360,000 m^{2}) of river bottomland. Over the next few years, construction of the fort and cultivation of the gardens took priority over military duties. Snelling recognized that the fort should strive toward self-sufficiency, especially since the government stopped paying for seed in 1821 and since the government often delivered spoiled food or starving cattle. By 1823, nearly 200 acres (0.81 km^{2}) were being cultivated, about half of which were used for growing wheat. A mill at Saint Anthony Falls, first built to saw lumber, was converted into a grist mill to grind the wheat into flour using millstones from St. Louis. General Winfield Scott inspected the fort during an 1824 visit and was so impressed that he suggested renaming the post Fort Snelling as a compliment to its commander. In 1825 the war department officially changed its name.

In order to deal peacefully with Native Americans in the vicinity of the fort, Snelling partnered with Indian Agent Lawrence Taliaferro. Taliaferro built a council house west of the fort in 1823, and was able to exert his influence by carefully distributing supplies such as food, gunpowder, tobacco, and whiskey to Native Americans. Taliaferro's cooperation with the Native Americans ensured good relations and helped to avert open hostilities between the Ojibwe and the Sioux.

In spite of the Northwest Ordinance of 1787 and the Missouri Compromise of 1820 which outlawed slavery in the area, Colonel Snelling, Taliaferro, and others at the fort illegally employed slave labor. Snelling rented the labor of an enslaved man named William from Taliaferro, and purchased two enslaved women named Mary and Louisa. While enslaved at Fort Snelling, Harriet Robinson Scott married Dred Scott, in a ceremony officiated by Taliaferro that would later give credence to the Scotts' suit for freedom.

== Family ==
In 1804, Snelling married Elizabeth Bell and fathered a son, William Joseph Snelling. Elizabeth Snelling died in 1810, leaving Josiah Snelling a widower with a young son.

During the War of 1812, when Snelling was stationed at Fort Detroit, he met and married 15-year-old Abigail Hunt. Between 1813 and 1827, Josiah and Abigail Snelling had seven children, with five surviving past infancy: Mary, Henry Hunt Snelling, James, Marion, and Josiah. When the Snellings lived at Fort Snelling, Abigail Hunt Snelling extended hospitality to visitors to the fort. She also founded a Sunday School for the fort's children and assisted families from the Red River Colony (the Selkirk Settlement).

Colonel Snelling's health began to decline in early 1826. He had suffered from chronic dysentery since the War of 1812, and the prescribed treatment of opium and brandy accelerated his alcoholism. He left the fort in October 1827 and died in Washington, D.C., the following summer.

== Legacy ==
Snelling had a reputation for being tough and fair-minded, but also had a mean temper when he was drunk, which often led to conflict with his fellow officers.

Two Minnesota streets, one in Minneapolis (Snelling Avenue), the other in Saint Paul (Snelling Avenue), in Minnesota's capital city, are named after him.

== Papers ==
Papers of Josiah Snelling are available for research use. They include photocopied letters written by Josiah Snelling, military commissions and related documents from his service in the Massachusetts militia (1803-1808) and the United States infantry (1808-1820), documents relating to the Connecticut state militia during the Revolutionary War, and a journal kept by Colonel Snelling as commandant at Fort Snelling
