= Francisco Naranjilla =

Filipino archer

Personal information
- Nationality: Filipino
- Born: June 5, 1932
- Died: May 2003
- Height: 5 ft 10 in (178 cm)

Sport
- Sport: Archery

Francisco Naranjilla (June 5, 1932 – May 2003) was a Filipino archer. He competed in the men's individual event at the 1972 Summer Olympics.
