= Ronald Bishop (archer) =

British archer (1931–2023)

Ron Bishop

Personal information
- Full name: Ronald Proctor Bishop
- Born: 30 May 1931; Liverpool, England
- Died: 8 June 2023 (aged 92)

Sport
- Sport: Archery

Ronald Proctor "Ron" Bishop (30 May 1931 – 8 June 2023) was a British archer. He competed in the men's individual event at the 1972 Summer Olympics. Bishop died on 8 June 2023, at the age of 92.
