= Post-Napoleonic Depression =

Economic depression following the Napoleonic Wars

The post-Napoleonic Depression was an economic depression in Europe and the United States after the end of the Napoleonic Wars in 1815. In England and Wales, an agricultural depression led to the passage of the Corn Laws (which were to polarize British politics for the next three decades), and placed great strain on the system of poor relief inherited from Elizabethan times.

In England, the Corn Laws exacerbated the situation. They imposed a tariff on foreign grain in an effort to protect English grain producers (agricultural landowners). The cost of food for working people rose as people were forced to buy the more expensive and lower quality British grain, and periods of famine and chronic unemployment ensued, increasing the desire for political reform both in Lancashire and in the country at large.

== England ==
After the end of the Napoleonic Wars in 1815, a brief boom in textile manufacture in England was followed by periods of chronic industrial economic depression, particularly among textile weavers and spinners (the textile trade was concentrated in Lancashire). Weavers who could have expected to earn 15 shillings for a six-day week in 1803, saw their wages cut to 5 shillings or even 4s 6d by 1818. The industrialists, who were cutting wages without offering relief, blamed market forces generated by the aftershocks of the Napoleonic Wars.

At the same time, the Corn Laws (the first of which was passed in 1815) exacerbated the situation. They imposed a tariff on foreign grain in an effort to protect English grain producers (agricultural landowners). The cost of food for working people rose as people were forced to buy the more expensive and lower quality British grain, and periods of famine and chronic unemployment ensued, increasing the desire for political reform both in Lancashire and in the country at large.

== Ireland ==
In Ireland, wheat and other grain prices fell by half, and alongside continued population growth, landlords converted cropland into rangeland by securing the passage of tenant farmer eviction legislation in 1816, which led, because of the Irish workforce's historic concentration in agriculture, to a greater subdivision of remaining land plots under tillage and increasingly less efficient and less profitable subsistence farms.

== Scotland ==
In Scotland, the depression ended in 1822.

== United States ==
Samuel Jackson of Pennsylvania theorised that the Panic of 1819 and resulting depression in the United States were caused by the post-Napoleonic depression, holding that the end of the Napoleonic wars had led to the collapse of export markets and resulting underconsumption.

== See also ==
- Chilean independence debt
- Haiti indemnity controversy
