= Louis-Henry Lemirre =

French archer (1929–2000)

Personal information
- Nationality: French
- Born: 8 April 1929; Vire, France
- Died: 1 August 2000 (aged 71); Vire, France

Sport
- Sport: Archery

Louis-Henry Lemirre (8 April 1929 – 1 August 2000) was a French archer. He competed in the men's individual event at the 1972 Summer Olympics.
