= Gilbert Emptaz =

French sports shooter (1950–2026)

Personal information
- Born: 12 February 1950
- Died: 27 June 2026 (aged 76)

Sport
- Sport: Sports shooting

Gilbert Emptaz (12 February 1950 – 27 June 2026) was a French sports shooter. He competed at the 1972 Summer Olympics and the 1976 Summer Olympics. Emptaz died on 27 June 2026, at the age of 76.
