= Olavi Laurila =

Finnish archer (born 1940)

Personal information
- Nationality: Finnish
- Born: 29 December 1940 (age 84); Vaasa, Finland

Sport
- Sport: Archery

Olavi Laurila (born 29 December 1940) is a Finnish archer. He competed in the men's individual event at the 1972 Summer Olympics.
