= Snell (given name) =

Snell is a masculine given name. Notable people with the name include:

- Snell Patel (born 1993), Indian cricketer
- Snell Putney (1929–2009), American sociologist, environmentalist and author
