= Ramón Aldea =

Filipino archer (born 1932)

Personal information
- Nationality: Filipino
- Born: August 13, 1932 (age 93) Manila, Philippine Islands
- Height: 5 ft 10 in (179 cm)

Sport
- Sport: Archery

Ramón S. Aldea (born August 13, 1932) is a Filipino former archer. He competed in the men's individual event at the 1972 Summer Olympics.
