= Luis Ayesa =

Filipino swimmer

Personal information
- Born: 5 February 1950 (age 76) Manila, Philippines

Sport
- Sport: Swimming
- College team: Long Beach

Luis A. Ayesa Jr. (born 5 February 1950) is a Filipino former swimmer. He competed at the 1968 Summer Olympics and the 1972 Summer Olympics.

== Career ==
Ayesa spent his grade school and high school years at De La Salle University. When he was in college, he moved to California State College, Long Beach, where he competed in university competitions, including relay events. In the 1969 NCAA University Division Swimming & Diving Championships, he competed in the 200 yard freestyle. Long Beach won the CCAA title and the PCAA title that year, and won 11 out of 12 meets they competed in. However, the NCAA did not allow them to compete for the NCAA title as Long Beach was planning to leave the CCAA. Long Beach's relay swim team were named All-Americans that year.

In 1970, Ayesa won in the PCAA 50 yd and 100 yd freestyles, and in the 400 yd medley and free relays. He defended his title in the 100 yd freestyle the following year. In 1972, he competed in three events in the 1972 NCAA swimming championships. He also won his third straight PCAA 100 yd freestyle title, and reclaimed the title in the 50 yd freestyle.

Ayesa first got to compete in the Olympics in the 1968 Summer Olympics. He got to compete in four events. In the 1972 Summer Olympics, competing in the third heat, he finished 6th in the 200 meter freestyle. He also competed in the 100 meter freestyle, but his time was not recorded. He also competed in the 100m relays.

== Legacy ==
In the year 2000, Ayesa was inducted into the De La Salle Alumni Association Sports Hall of Fame.
