= Horst Aisslinger =

German philatelist

- Born: 2 April 1925
- Died: 25 February 1992 (aged 66)
- Occupation: Philatelist

Signature
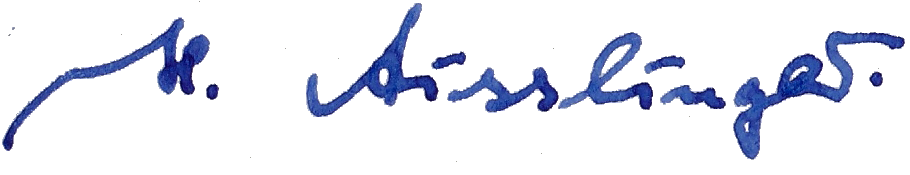

Horst Aisslinger (2 April 1925 – 25 February 1992) was a German philatelist who was added to the Roll of Distinguished Philatelists in 1981.
