= Kim Kyui-hwan =

South Korean volleyball player (born 1948)

Kim Kyui-Hwan

Personal information
- Nationality: South Korean
- Born: February 28, 1948 (age 78); South Korea

Kim Kyui-Hwan (born 28 February 1948) is a South Korean former volleyball player who competed in the 1972 Summer Olympics.
