= Brian Carr-Hartley =

Kenyan sports shooter

Personal information
- Born: 24 April 1938 (age 88)

Sport
- Sport: Sports shooting

Brian Carr-Hartley (born 24 April 1938) is a Kenyan former sports shooter. He competed in the trap event at the 1972 Summer Olympics.
