= John Snelling =

British archer (born 1946)

Personal information
- Nationality: British
- Born: 8 March 1946 (age 79)

Sport
- Sport: Archery

John Snelling (born 8 March 1946) is a British archer. He competed in the men's individual event at the 1972 Summer Olympics.

== Personal life ==
He lived at 33 Beaumont Road in Barrow upon Soar.
