= Kim Tae-suk =

South Korean sports shooter

Personal information
- Born: 4 September 1946 (age 79)

Sport
- Sport: Sports shooting

Korean name
- Hangul: 김태석
- Hanja: 金兌錫
- RR: Gim Taeseok
- MR: Kim T'aesŏk

Kim Tae-suk (Korean: 김태석; born 4 September 1946) is a South Korean former sports shooter. He competed in the trap event at the 1972 Summer Olympics.
