= Werner Aisslinger =

German furniture designer

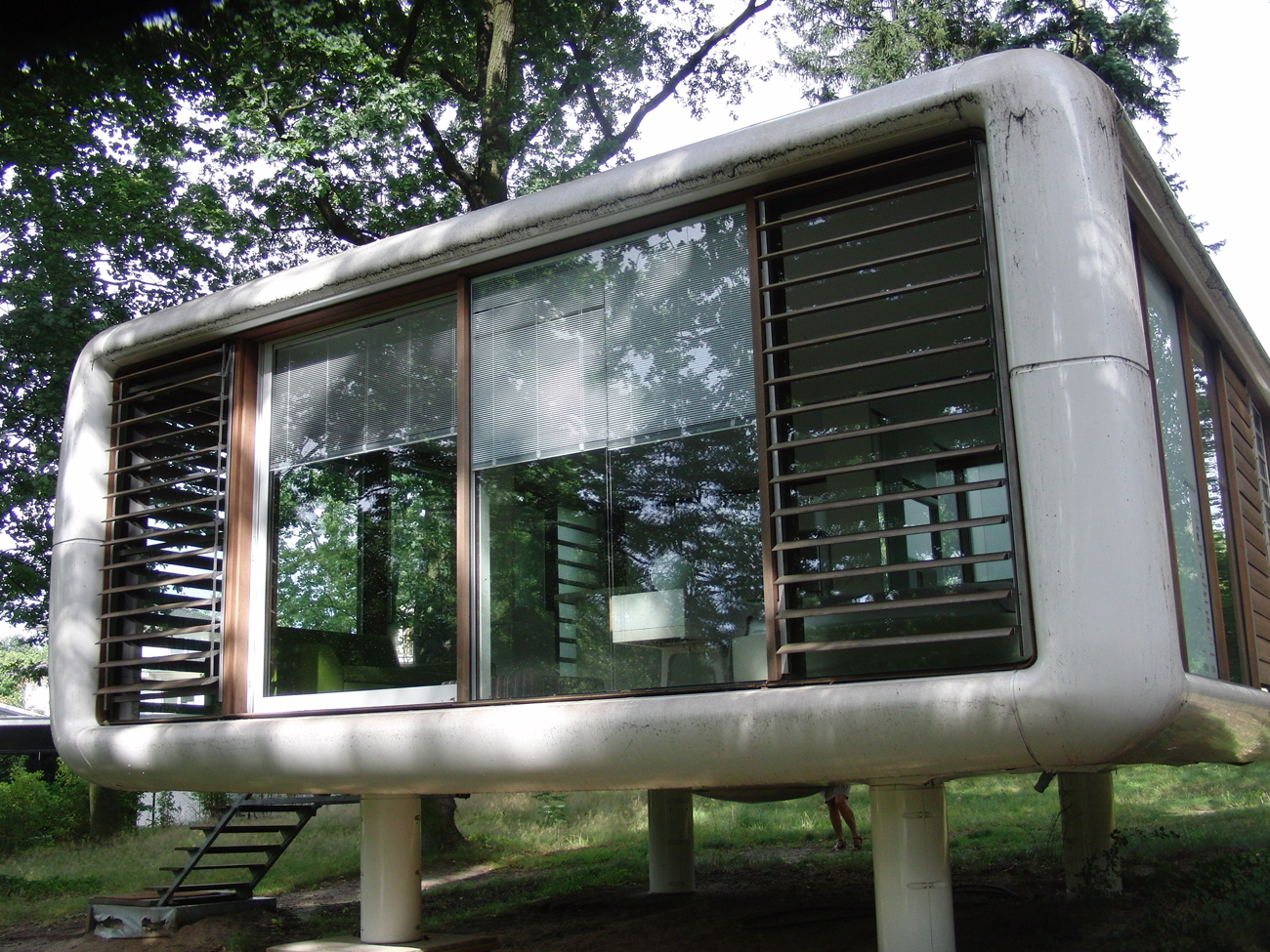
Loftcube by Werner Aisslinger, designed for the Designmai, Berlin 2003

Werner Aisslinger (born 3 November 1964 in Nördlingen) is a German furniture designer. He is the designer of the Loftcube, a modular room structure intended for placement on rooftops.
