= Snell Acoustics =

Snell Acoustics was an American manufacturer of high-end loudspeakers which was founded by Peter Snell (1946–1984) in Massachusetts in 1976. In 1995, the company was purchased by Boston Acoustics. It ceased manufacturing in May 2010.
