= 2026 European heatwaves =

Heatwaves in Europe in 2026

Meteorological history
- Duration: 24 May 2026 – September 2026
- Heat wave
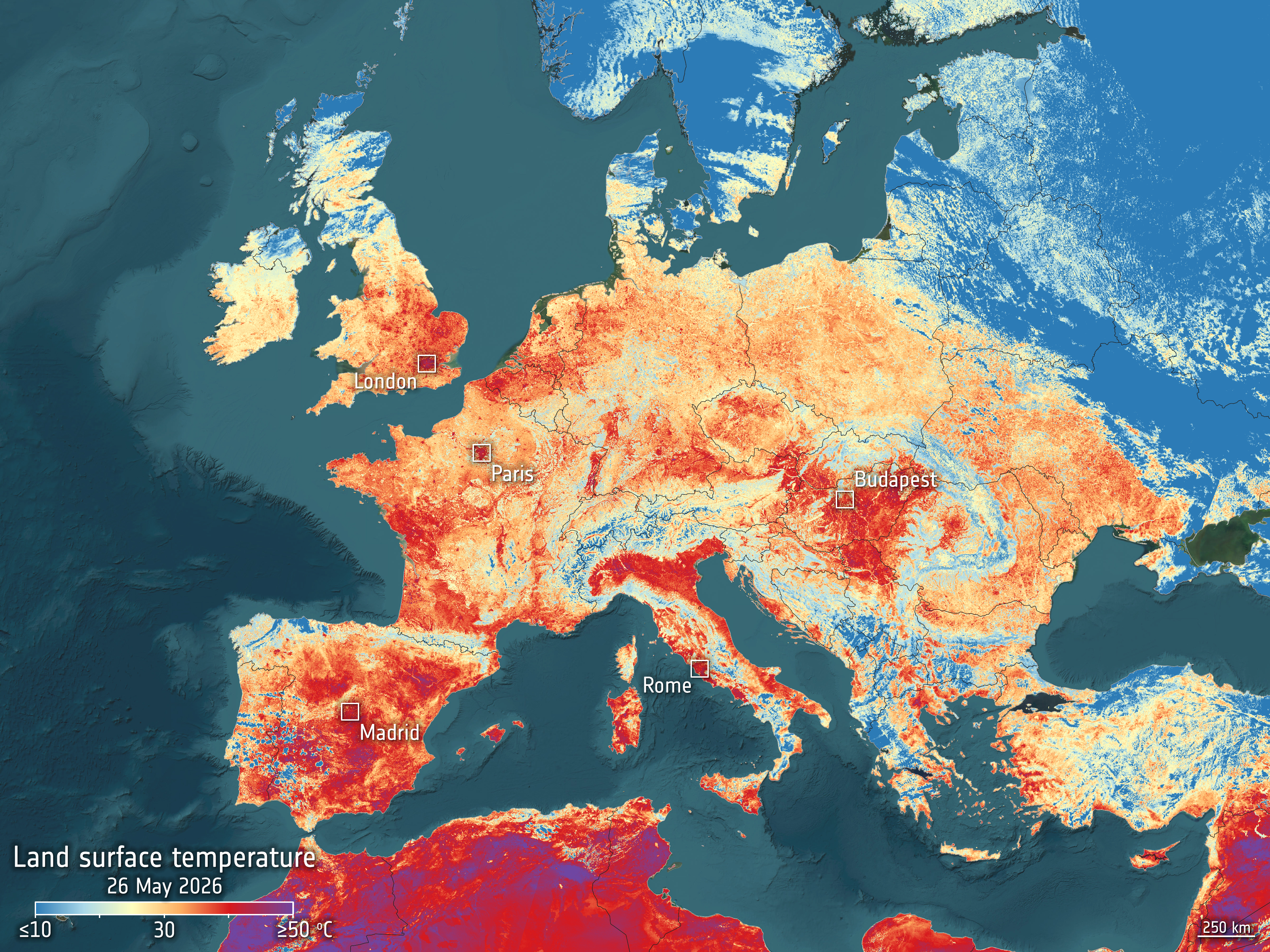
- Thematic radiometer imagery of surface temperature captured by Copernicus Sentinel-3 on Tuesday 26 May 2026
- Max temp: 48.4 °C (119.1 °F), recorded at Orani, Sardinia, Italy, on 19 July 2026

Overall effects
- Fatalities: Total: At least 50,391 (urban areas only); Estimated death toll by country: (Note: Some of these numbers are partial, because they were published during the early stages of the heatwave.): Germany: 16,000; France: 14,458; Spain: 5,123; United Kingdom: 2,877; Italy: 2,700; Belgium: 2,000; Netherlands: 1,323; Poland: 1,070; Hungary: 224; Switzerland: 220; Luxembourg: 23; Greece: 8; Romania: 4; Bulgaria: 2; Denmark: 1
- Damage: €180 billion
- Areas affected: Europe

Conditions as of 26 June per the ERCC

Temperature conversion
Celsius	Fahrenheit
30	86
31	88
32	90
33	91
34	93
35	95
36	97
37	99
38	100
39	102
40	104
41	106
42	108
43	109
44	111
45	113

Starting in late May, severe heatwaves affected Europe. Temperature records were broken in 18 countries. The first heatwave began on 24 May, with temperatures higher than normal and heat-related deaths. Temperatures were the highest ever recorded for May, starting Central Europe's summer earlier than usual. Western Europe was the most affected.

A second, more severe heatwave began on 17 June. (Note: Astronomical summer did not begin until 21 June, its meteorological equivalent having, by European standards, already begun on 1 June.) On 26 June, the World Meteorological Organization said the heatwave was expected to affect Western Europe, Central Europe and Southern Europe over the following two weeks. By 5 July, over 5,600 excess deaths were reported.

A third heatwave began on 4 July in the United Kingdom. The UK Health Security Agency issued heat-health alerts. Official heatwave conditions started 6 July in parts of southeastern England that exceeded 28° for the third consecutive day. Temperatures peaked at 35.5° in Wisley, Surrey, on 9 July, the eighth day above 34 °C (93.2 °F), a UK record for the most days exceeding that temperature in a single year. The duration of this heatwave led to 'extreme' marine heatwaves, affecting the southern North Sea and parts of the English Channel.

The heat triggered forest fires and widespread drought. The Elbe, Rhine and Danube experienced a severe drought, including a record shallowness in the Balkans on 10 August. The increased water temperature raised concerns over rivers becoming too hot and shallow for nuclear power stations to use for cooling.

== By country ==
Contents
- Austria
- Belarus
- Belgium
- Bulgaria
- Croatia
- Czech Republic
- Denmark
- Estonia
- Finland
- France
- Germany
- Hungary
- Ireland
- Italy
- Latvia
- Lithuania
- Luxembourg
- Moldova
- Netherlands
- Norway
- Poland
- Portugal
- Slovakia
- Slovenia
- Spain
- Sweden
- Switzerland
- Ukraine
- United Kingdom

=== Albania ===
Temperatures in Albania hovered between 35-40° on 23 June. The Ministry of Health put out a heat warning on 24 June. Berat and Gjirokastër reached 40°, but the national average fell to 39° on 6 July.

=== Andorra ===
The 23-29 May heatwaves caused several temperatures over 30°. Civil Protection issued a temperature related alert.

Civil Protection issued a temperature related yellow alert on 18 July, due to forecasted temperatures of 30° and 33°.

=== Austria ===
==== May and June ====
In May, temperature records were set at 46 GeoSphere Austria stations. Of those, Lienz had the highest temperature, recording 33.3° on 26 May, one of a record eight hot days of at least 30° in May. Bregenz and Eisenstadt also set records for hot days in May. May rainfall in some regions was 50–67% below the 1991–2020 average and was the fifth sunniest.

Another heatwave, with highs from 30–36°, ran through the end of June. On 20 June, temperatures reached 35° at five stations and 36 in Bad Deutsch-Altenburg, the first time in Austria in 2026. On 21 June, 18 stations recorded 36°.

The 28 June Austrian Grand Prix was declared a heat hazard.

On 27 June, June temperature records were set in six out of nine states, as well as in Vienna, Innsbruck, and Bad Goisern where temperatures surpassed.

On 28 June, temperatures exceeded 39° in Lower Austria and Vienna, breaking June temperature records nationwide at 102 of 251 stations while Vienna's the Innere Stadt district reached 41.

On 29 June, nighttime temperatures stayed above 20° at 90 of 280 stations and 40.1° was measured in Bad Deutsch-Altenburg.

After 14 days the heatwave ended on 1 July, having setrecords 148 of 251 stations. This June was more than 2.5° warmer than the 1991–2020 average, but only the fifth-warmest.

==== July and August ====
The next heatwave began on 29 July accompanied by drought and wildfires, given that rainfall had been approximately 30% below normal. Temperatures above 30 were the norm throughout August.

On 31 July, Wieselburg hit 40.3, a national record for the highest July temperature. July records were broken in at least 30 stations.

On 3 August, temperatures crossed 38 in northeastern Austria and broke 40 in some spots. On 4 August, temperatures crossed 40 at nine stations. A 41.2 reading in Bad Deutsch-Altenburg came on 5 August broke a record.

On 10 August, water levels along the Danube in Austria were so low that around 30 percent of all Austrian cruises were cancelled. Water levels in the Danube at Hainburg an der Donau were the lowest on record, significantly lower than during the 2003 European heatwave. In mid-August a 19 percent decline in the grain harvest was forecast for 2026 compared to 2025.

As of 13 August, Austria had faced approximately 270 forest fires, burning approximately five times more area than average.

Multiple stations recorded temperatures in excess of 30° on more than 50 days, led by Ferlach with 59 days.

=== Belarus ===
On 14 July Belhydromet predicted heavy thunderstorms and issued a yellow alert.

For the first time in history, the temperature in Belarus rose above 40°. Pinsk recorded a temperature of 40.4° on 29 June.

On 6 August, the temperature reached 40.3 in Mazyr.

=== Belgium ===
Between 23 and 25 May, Uccle recorded sweltering temperatures in Brussels, where temperatures peaked at 31 on 25 May. On 26 May, Uccle broke the 1985 record, peaking at 30.3°.

Between 20 and 25 June, temperatures in Uccle reached 35.3. On 24 June, Belgium faced record price of over €1 per kWh of electricity at sunset, as traditional power stations struggled to cope with increased air conditioning.

On 26 June, the annual Battle of Waterloo reenactment was cancelled.

Between 18 and 29 June, the excess mortality rate was 39 percent, with 1,222 excess deaths reported. A report by Sciensano published on 8 July reported 1.747 excess deaths between 18 June and 1 July, an excess of 48%, the deadliest in 30 years.

=== Bosnia and Herzegovina ===
==== June ====
On 28 June, Mostar reached 41°, the highest national June temperature. The temperature in Mostar on 27 June was 39°.

==== July–August ====
After a cooling period, another heatwave struck Bosnia on 30 July pushing temperatures Mostar and Široki Brijeg to 42°. That day, Trebinje recorded 39.6°, breaking the record set in 2000. On 31 July, six cities exceeded 35° while Mostar breached 40°. On 1 August, Mostar recorded a 41° temperature for the second day consecutively and for the third day consecutively above 40°. On 4 August, Mostar recorded 40° as it was on its sixth day consecutively above the temperature. On the same day, five cities were above 35°.Beginning on 5 August, Mostar was above 40° for a run of seven days. The day after, 11 cities recorded temperatures above 35° with Mostar reaching 43° while the city was above 40° for nine days.

==== August ====
In late August, another heatwave struck in Gradačac reaching all-time high of 41°. During the heatwave, dust from Sahara engulfed Bosnia, including Sarajevo. Mostar recorded a temperature of 39° on 27 August.

==== Fires ====
Multiple regions in Bosnia were hit by fires during the heat. Between 30 and 31 July, fires broke out in Široki Brijeg, Teslić, and near Banja Luka. Authorities proclaimed a high alert over the increased risk of fires. On 23 August, a fire broke out on Trebević near Sarajevo. After it was controlled, it reignited on 26 August. The fire was extinguished on 12 September.

==== Water supply crisis in Sarajevo ====
On 20 August KJKP ViK Sarajevo, formed teams to patrol households to stabilize the water supply. On 30 August, ViK Sarajevo cut daily water supply from 1:00 AM to 5:00 AM and from 11:00 AM to 4:00 PM. Locals complained about the lack of information about the cuts. Water levels remained critically low throughout September while reports stated that Bačevo spring, which supplies over 400,000 people recorded low water levels. ViK Sarajevo estimated that only weeks of rain would replenish the water supply. On 21 September, one of the Bačevo wells was only two centimeters above the critical level. Locals from Jarčedoli complained that they had no water for five days and that the water truck had come only once.

Water supply cuts lasted until as late as 6:00 AM. Water supply remained restricted into October. On 13 October, ViK ended its day-time water supply cuts. It was estimated that Sarajevo's water supply had a 70% loss, the highest of European cities.

=== Bulgaria ===
The Danubian Plain in Bulgaria approached 38 ° during late June.

Bulgaria was predicted on 26 June, to hit by temperatures of up to 38 ° over the next week and a Code Red heat alert was issued that day.

Temperatures were between 32 ° and 37 ° on 30 July and were expected to reach 43 ° that weekend. The National Institute of Meteorology and Hydrology (NIMH) recorded temperatures of 40C on 3 August and predicted 42-43C for the next few days.

==== Subsequent fires ====
Many of them were accidents or neglectfully used portable barbeques, but many were considered to be arson.

Devastating forest fires, mostly caused by arsonists, swept the country on 23 July.

Fires still raged around Sliven, Burgas, Plovdiv, Stara Zagora, Yambol, Haskovo, Blagoevgrad and Kyustendil Bulgaria on 27 July 2025.

Several social media posts, epically on X condemned the fire raising and arson attacks on 1 August.

=== Croatia ===
Croatia experienced a heatwave in the second half of June. In its weather forecast for 19 June, the Croatian Meteorological and Hydrological Service (DHMZ) reported that temperatures were expected to reach 32° in central Croatia and up to 34° in some areas along the coast, with sunny and hot weather likely to continue for several days. In coastal areas, temperatures were expected to remain between 21° and 24° during the night as well.

On 26 June, DHMZ issued a red alert for much of Croatia's coast, reporting that temperatures were likely to reach 34 ° in most of the country and up to 36° in its southern parts, and expecting the heatwave to reach its peak by 28 June, when highs of 39° were predicted to occur in the country's interior. In coastal areas, temperatures were expected to remain above 25° during the night as well.

On 28 June, DHMZ recorded highs in excess of 36° in many parts of the country, both along the coast and in the interior, with a temperature of 37.5° measured in Imotski, followed by 37.0° in Senj. On 29 June, temperatures rose to between 36° and 38° in several cities around the country, Osijek reached 38°, following multiple days on which highs in excess of 35° had been recorded in eastern Croatia, whilst a temperature of 39° was measured in both Senj and Cres.

On 30 June, temperatures reached 39.5° in Split, which broke a July 1950 record of 38.6° for the highest temperature measured in the city, as local June temperature records were also broken in Šibenik and Zadar. During the same day, a temperature of 41.0° was measured in Knin, surpassing a 2022 record of 40.4° for the highest June temperature measured in the city. Temperatures in excess of 38° were recorded in many places along the coast, as well as in eastern Croatia, with highs of 39.8° at Osijek Airport and 38.8° in the city of Osijek, respectively. Late in the afternoon, a storm caused by the heat affected parts of Dalmatia.

On 1 July, temperatures were expected to reach between 32° and 37°, as thunderstorms began to occur in many parts of Croatia in the afternoon, eventually ending the heatwave that, according to DHMZ, had begun on 20 June in northern parts of the Croatian coast.

Another heatwave in Croatia began on 30 July, when the highest heat warning was in effect for Rijeka and the surrounding region. Hot and sunny weather was expected to affect most of the country in the coming days and persist into the first week of August, with temperatures predicted to reach between 35° and 40° on 1 August, and stay around 25° or higher overnight in some areas, especially along the coast. According to a weather forecast published on 30 July, the heatwave was likely to last at least one week. Temperatures were expected to reach 37 ° in eastern Croatia on 31 July, with highs between 33° and 38° predicted to occur along and near the coast the same day. Highs of 40° were likely to occur in the Dalmatian Hinterland on both 1 and 2 August.

On 6 August, the heatwave reached its peak in eastern Croatia, with a temperature of 40.0° measured at Osijek Airport. At the time, it was also reported that the waters in the Drava and the Danube in the region had fallen to the lowest levels for years, mainly due to a combination of long-standing heat and a lack of precipitation.

On 11 and 12 August, intense heat spread along the Croatian coast, with several stations setting new local temperature records, including a temperature of 39.8 ° in Senj and temperatures of 40.1° and 40.2° in Dubrovnik and Split, respectively.

==== Subsequent fires ====
Late on 28 June, a forest fire broke out on the island of Vis, requiring an all-night firefighting operation with 15 vehicles and 70 firefighters. On the morning of 29 June, four aircraft arrived to assist in the firefighting operation and the fire was localised during the same day. Approximately 300|ha|acres}} of pine forest and macchia were affected, although no inhabited buildings were damaged.

On 30 June, fires broke out on the island of Čiovo and near Orebić on the Pelješac peninsula as a result of lightning strikes during thunderstorms in the region. The following day, it was reported that the two fires were under control. However, there were several other fires in southern Croatia and firefighters warned of an increased number of wildfires compared to the previous year. The fire on the island of Čiovo reignited on 2 July and was not declared extinguished until the morning of 11 July. By then, it had burnt approximately 120 hectares of landscape covered with grass, macchia and pine forests.

On 4 July, a fire broke out on the island of Hvar, affecting approximately 200 hectares of landscape covered with grass, macchia and pine forests, and requiring an extensive firefighting operation involving dozens of vehicles and four aircraft. The following day, it was reported that the fire was under control. It was the second fire to affect the island in two weeks and one of its most devastating fires in approximately a decade.

On 11 July, two fires affected a pine forest on the island of Korčula. They merged into a single fire later that day, prompting an extensive firefighting operation overnight. Approximately 170 firefighters were initially involved. They received assistance from four firefighting aircraft on the morning of 12 July. On 13 July, it was reported that the fire was under control after it had burnt almost 900|ha|acres}} of mostly forested landscape and spread over an area approximately 4|km|miles}} wide.

On the evening of 13 August, strong winds caused a fire to affect approximately 1000 hectares of landscape in just four hours and quickly spread towards the town of Omiš, leading to extensive damage to buildings, destroying numerous vehicles and prompting the evacuation of approximately 1,200 residents and tourists in the area. On 15 August, the fire was reported to be under control, leaving at least one person dead and dozens injured, of whom eight people were hospitalised with life-threatening burns.

On 14 August, a fire broke out on the island of Dugi Otok, burning approximately 300 hectares of forest and macchia before it was localised during the afternoon of 15 August.

=== Cyprus ===
Two boys from Bulgaria died locked in a car on June 29 as temperatures hit around 38°.

Rolling power cuts came on July 29 as the power grid faced collapse.

=== Czech Republic ===
The Czech Republic recorded its hottest day on 27 June, reaching 40.9° in Doksany, exceeded there one day later, at 41.9.

=== Denmark ===
On 27 June, Denmark's all-time temperature record fell, reaching 36.6° north of Odense. Temperatures reached 37.0° in Ødum, north of Aarhus and in Beldringe, north of Odense.

A second heatwave began on 11 July, when temperatures reached 29.8° in Ødum.

=== Faroe Islands ===
The islands avoided the heat waves.

=== France ===
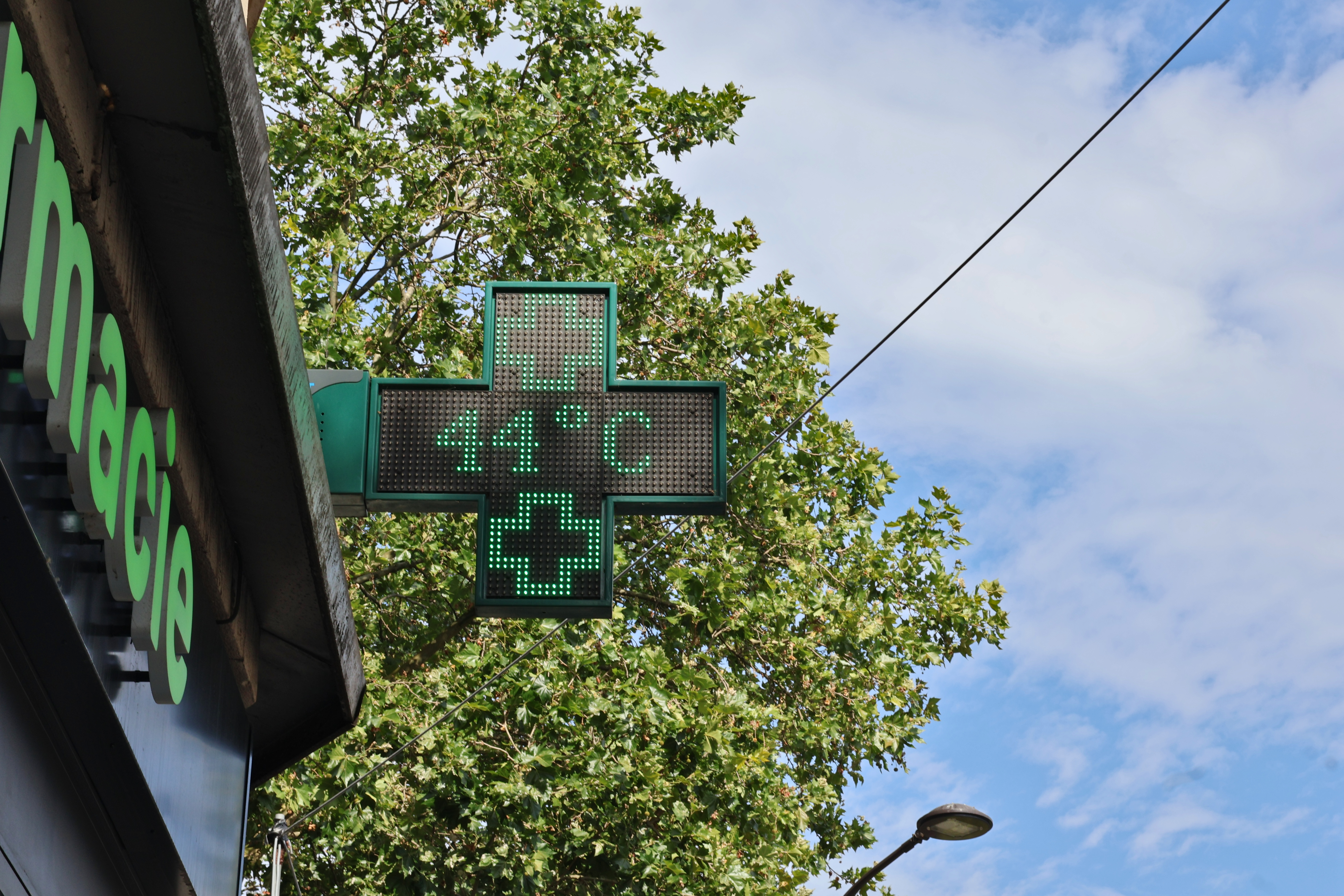
Paris, 26 June at 17:28. A pharmacy's thermometer sign shows 44°.

In May, record-breaking temperatures arrived. The national average was 24.9° on 26 May, the hottest May on record. The heat dome continued with Angoulême-La Couronne hitting 37.8° on 28 May. Seven heat-related deaths occurred in May.

Beginning on 22 June, overnight temperatures were the hottest recorded, leading to a red alert for 54 departments. The nationwide heat index, 29.8°. The single highest temperature was 44.3° in Pissos, with parts of Western France above 40°. Bordeaux reached 41.1°. Nearly half of metropolitan France was affected.

Average maximum temperatures for June in metropolitan France, and difference with the average maximum temperatures for June between 1991 and 2020.

Drowning deaths in France markedly increased. On 26 June, Sports Minister Marina Ferrari stated that two-thirds of the 55 people that had drowned had been swimming in unauthorized areas, and emergency services reported 61% more calls than the previous week, and 75% more than the previous year. The Canal Saint-Martin opened to public swimming. At least 18 died from related causes, including two children in a car. 845 junior and middle schools closed, and a further 1,800 adjusted their teaching schedules. Around 68,000 households experienced power outages.

By 24 June, two-thirds of France was under a red alert. On 25 June, 75% of the Metropolitan France departments were under red alert. Paris mayor Emmanuel Grégoire announced that nearly all of the "critical indicators" were up: calls to emergency medical services and fire brigades, ER admissions, and deaths. Two nuclear power plants were shut down, and later a third because the water they used to cool became too hot.

Number of days with temperatures of 40°C or higher (up to August 27). Many weather stations, particularly in western France, recorded more days at 40°C or higher than during the entire 1975–2025 period.

On 25 June, a rare heat burst event was observed at Belle-Île. Temperature rapidly increased from 26° to 34° when the high-altitude air of a thunderstorm crashed down at over 100 km/h, lasting less than an hour.

On 26 June, Enedis stated that 50,000 of its clients were without power. In Paris, police chief Patrice Faure stated that emergency services were overwhelmed by heat-related illnesses; 55 people died under emergency care in 24 hours, versus three or five typically. SAMU announced that 109 people had died in Paris in 24 hours, against seven normally.

The city announced restrictions on alcohol from 26 to 28 June, banning public consumption of alcohol (with exceptions) from 12:00 to 07:00, and sales prohibited from 18:00 through the following morning from Friday through Sunday. Paris Pride (postponed) and the Solidays music festival were delayed, along with Ironman Nice.The Diamond League Meeting de Paris continued, with non-professional events cancelled.

On 28 June, 1,000 excess deaths were recorded compared to prior months. Ambulance services responded to more than 122,000 calls during the heatwave. Severe lightning storms hit much of northern France.. An estimate by Dr Christopher Callahan, a climate scientist at Indiana University, reported that the heatwave had killed more than 5,000 people between 22 and 28 June. 10,000 excess mortality deaths were recorded between June 17 and July 2.

Average maximum temperatures for July in metropolitan France, and difference with the average maximum temperatures for July between 1991 and 2020.

Between 24 and 26 June the temperature hit 40°. The previous temperature records, datting from the 19th century, were in 1947, 2019, and 2022. The heatwave killed more than 14,000 people.

In mid-July during a third heatwave the Louvre, the Eiffel tower, and other tourist destinations again curtailed their hours, and the Tour de France shorted a portion of its racing route through hilly terrain, for the first time. 24 departments were under maximum heat alert.

==== Subsequent fires ====
Wildfires started in the north of France where wildfires are uncommon, such as Fontainebleau.

Forest fires hit Gironde on 5 August detonating some unexploded World War II ordnance around Le Porge due to heat in the soil (the Goff Effect).

Outside Montpellier and La Tieule, 200 firefighters fought forest fires on 9 August.

=== Germany ===
==== May ====
Temperatures rose above 30° on 23 May. Increased cooling demands combined with the use of more expensive power sources due to lower wind power generation caused day-ahead prices to jump by 29% on 27 May.

Many weather stations recorded records ≥ 30°, especially in the south. In the Upper Rhine region, six to seven hot days were recorded locally. Wutöschingen-Ofteringen, Baden-Württemberg, recorded nine hot days in May, more than double the prior record of four set in May 2005. The highest temperature recorded in Germany in May was 34° in Regensburg, Bavaria, on 26 May.

==== June ====
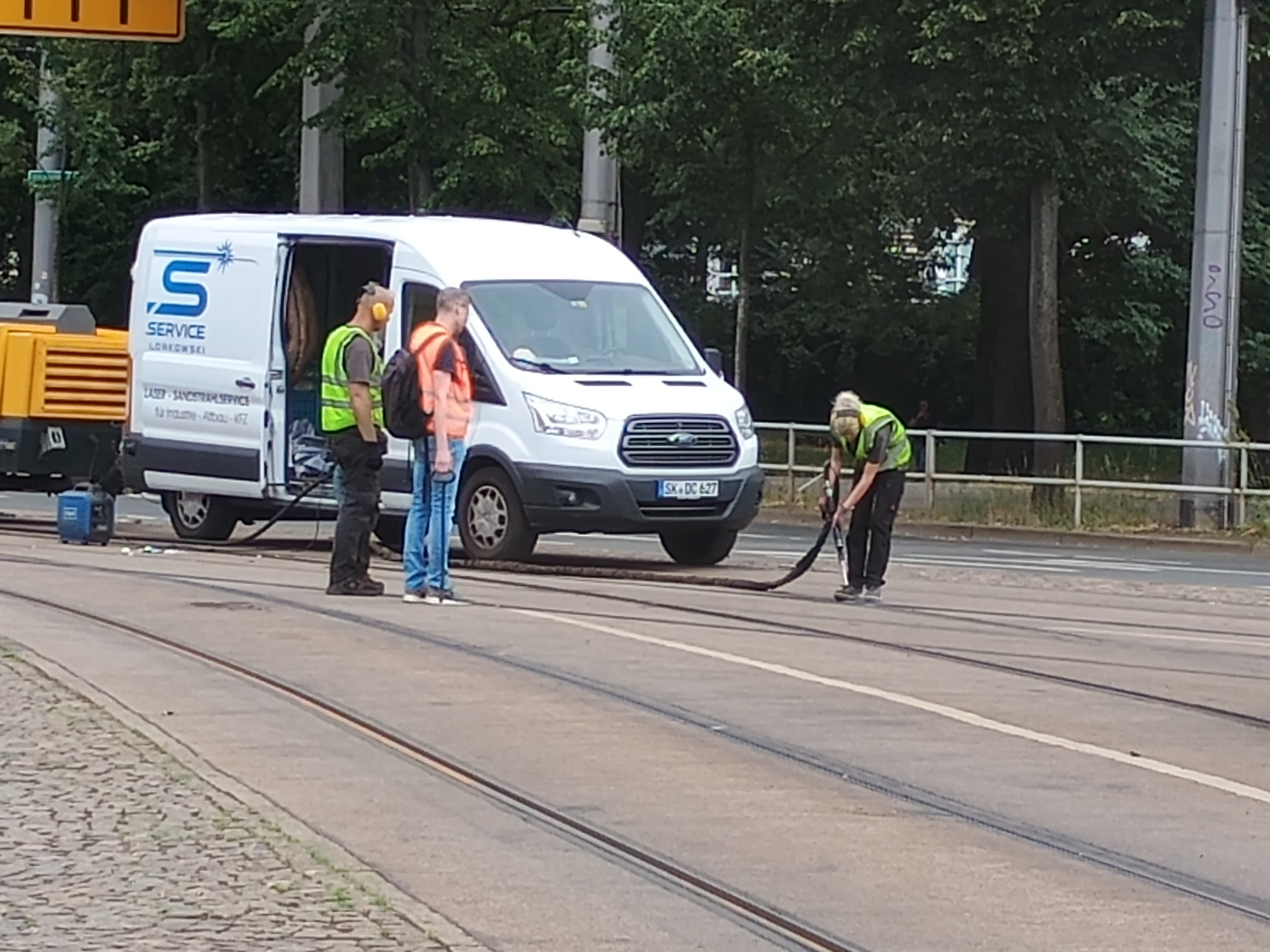
A woman in high-visibility clothing using a blowtorch to clean and repair bitumen, a component of the tram track, that was damaged by the heatwave in Leipzig, Germany, in June

Germany experienced another heatwave in the second half of June. Starting in the southwest, on 17 June temperatures exceeded 30° at 25 weather stations, topped by 32.7° at Müllheim. Two days later the heat spread over 441 stations (of 505) peaking at 38.5° in Kitzingen. On 25 June, Deutsche Bahn offered its clientele free cancellation of reservations made before 23 June, and later advised against travel due to wildfire risks, heavy rain, and thunderstorms.

On 26 June, a national record of 41.3° was set in Saarbrücken, while 23 weather stations matched the old record for June, from 30 June 2019 in Bernburg at 39.6°. The record was set again on 27 June in Drewitz, part of Möckern, in northern Saxony-Anhalt, 41.8°.

By 27 June, 13 of 16 German states had broken records. National Express suspended railway service in North Rhine-Westphalia for six hours, and advised only essential travel. The concrete in several autobahn areas burst, closuring roads. The tram network in Leipzig suspended service over melting asphalt. Near Hamburg the main traffic lane of the Bundesautobahn 7 (A7) was closed because of split asphalt. A motorway in Brandenburg and Saxony-Anhalt closed on 30 June due to heat damage. About 160 people had to be evacuated from a nursing home in Dormagen on 26 June, after temperatures reached 35°, killing two.

On 28 June, temperatures reached 41.7° in Coschen. In Gohrischheide, Saxony, a wildfire broke out in a nature reserve contaminated with World War II munitions. Berlin police fired water cannons to cool people off. 46 official weather stations recorded temperatures exceeding 40°, while 252 stations broke all-time records.

Heat-related fatalities numbered 810 by 21 June. Cities and districts in North Rhine-Westphalia recorded many fatalities. Cologne recorded four times as many deaths from 26-28 June compared to an average weekend. Casualties in Remscheid, Wuppertal and Solingen were twice as high as usual. Emergency rooms were overcrowded with people having health-related issues such as sunstrokes, heat exhaustion and heatstrokes.

==== July ====
On 30 July, temperatures rose to 40.5°. Three states broke July records.

==== Fatalities ====
In mid-July the German lifeguard federation announced nearly 100 drowning deaths, most of whom were young men, and 40 of whom were younger than thirty, the most since the June 2003 heatwave.

By 27 August, heat-related deaths were estimated to be 15,800, the highest in a decade of monitoring.

=== Greece ===
Temperatures reached 42° on 18 July.

Temperatures neared 43° on 21 July and again the following day.

An orange heat warning followed temperatures of 43.5° on 22 July.

==== Fires ====
A forest fire threatened a village on the island of Paros on 29 July. Two firefighters died firefighting in Crete, and one elsewhere in Greece on 29 July. A forest fire killed two people near Thessaloniki on 1 July. A forest fire outside Liti, about 15 km/9 miles north-west of the city of Thessaloniki killed two more on 30 July.

A Greek and a Dane were killed by forest fire near Megara on 2 August. Another fire hit the tourist island of Kefalonia and village of Psatha, near Athens that day.

The fires had mostly been contained by 4 August.

=== Hungary ===
Hungary experienced a heatwave in the second half of June. On 20 June, a temperature of 37.1° was measured in Aszód. Between 22 and 25 June, temperatures were expected to reach between 30-36°, whilst the peak of the heatwave was expected to occur between 26 and 28 June, with highs between 32-38°.

On 27 June, a temperature of 40.0° was recorded in Budakalász, which marked the first time the value had been reached in Hungary in June, and a temperature of 40.7° was measured at the same station the following day. Also on 27 June, a temperature of 39.8° was recorded in the Újpest district of Budapest, which by far surpassed a 1935 record for the highest temperature measured in the capital on that date.

On 30 June, a temperature of 42.0° in Szécsény set a new all-time temperature record for Hungary, surpassing a July 2007 record of 41.9° in Kiskunhalas.

The Paks Nuclear Power Plant was shut down because of drought induced record low water levels in the Danube River on 3 August. Concern was raised over the impact river shrinkage and temporary could have on the cooling system of atomic power plants. It was reactivated on 10 August as river water began to rise.

=== Ireland ===
May

Ireland saw its highest May temperature on record broken on two consecutive days. Clonmel and Killarney recording 28.8° on 25 May, beating the previous May record of 28.4° in Kerry in 1997. On 26 May, Shannon Airport in County Clare recorded a temperature of 30.6°. Temperatures at multiple other stations in the country hit 30.9° on the same day. This broke the national record for May again. This was also the first time in history a temperature of over 30° was recorded in the month of May in Ireland.

On 27 May, temperatures rose above 30.0° for the second day in a row at Shannon Airport.

Met Éireann reported that the temperature in south Ireland was five standard deviations over the May average.

June

A second heatwave that began building over western Europe on 17 June reached Ireland, with the heat hitting Ireland from the 20 June onwards.

Temperatures of 30° across the country were widespread, with that temperature being recorded on multiple days during the week beginning 21 June, reaching a peak on 25 June of 32.2° in Athenry. The heat in June was deemed oppressive as the recorded dew point reached the mid 20s Celsius, meaning that the outside air temperature often felt a lot hotter than recorded. The heat index in Galway rose to over 40.0° on 25 June, while on multiple days in the same week across the east of Ireland and in cities like Dublin it reached over 36°.

June also saw tropical nights recorded in Dublin and Carlow. On the night of 25 June, temperatures did not fall below 20° at Casement Aerodrome or Oak Park.

July

After a short reprieve from heat, another high temperature warning was issued by Met Éirean on 7 July. The alert initially lasted for one week, however in parts of the south of the country, it was extended multiple times.

On 9 July, heatwave status was reached in Moorepark, Cork with stations in Tipperary and Kilkenny following the next day as temperatures at these locations were above 25° for more than five days.

On 11 July, Valentia Island recorded a temperature of over 30°, making it the hottest day ever recorded at the station.

The hot spell in July became one of the longest in recorded history in Ireland, with Moorepark recording the second longest heatwave with 13 consecutive days, just one day short of the 1976 record of 14.

However, the town of Clonmel provisionally recorded heatwave conditions for 18 consecutive days. If confirmed it would break the previous record.

On the night of 28 July, a tropical night was again recorded in Dublin.

August

Above average conditions continued into the month of August. Met Éireann issued a fourth yellow weather warning for heat that summer on 12 August, remaining in place until 14 August.

The heat was mainly focused on the midlands and eastern half of the country. On 12 August, the Casement Aerodrome station in Dublin recorded a temperature of 31.2°, the highest temperature ever recorded in the month of August for the capital. Temperatures of over 30° were also recorded at Oak Park in Carlow, and in other southeastern counties like Wicklow.

The heat in August meant that a temperature of over 30° had been recorded in four consecutive months in Ireland, (May-August) making 2026 the first year to reach that milestone.

Official drought had been declared across the country with a hosepipe ban put in place by Uisce Éireann for six weeks from late July.

=== Italy ===
Red alert warnings were issued for Rome, Florence, Bologna, Brescia, and Turin on 28 May. Temperatures reached 38° in various cities. The thermal stress to the cables in the local grid led to repeated blackouts in Turin.

On 24 June, red alerts were issued for 16 cities, including Rome, Milan, Florence, and Turin.

On 25 June, courts in Palermo suspended all non-exigent proceedings due to malfunctioning air conditioning, and the newspaper Corriere della Sera reported five deaths.

On 26 June, the ANSA news agency reported that Genoa was the 18th city to be placed under red alert, and the Uffizi Gallery extended a suspension of ticket sales and limited visiting hours. Clam fishers on the Po River estuary reported macro algae growth, which they had to clean off their nets, a blue crab infestation, and a massive die-off of clams in the 21° waters. Sea water entered 20 km upstream, and the flow of the Po River at large had collapsed from its June average of 1500 m^{3}/s to 300 m^{3}/s. The environmental group Legambiente calculated less than three weeks of water reserve.

48.4° was recorded at Orani, Italy.

46.5° were then recorded at Noto, Sicily, Italy on July 22.

==== Subsequent fires ====
A large forest fire hit Tuscany on May 1, leading to thousands of people being evacuated.

Forest fires occurred across Italy on July 31, with multiple fires in Sardinia, Piedmont and Sicily.

=== Kosovo ===
A temperature record for Kosovo was recorded in Hani i Elezit, at 41.6°. Other high temperatures were at Klinë 42.5°, Gjakova 40.7°, Rahovec 40.2°, Suhareka 40.4°, Prizren 40.3°, Pristina 38.4°, Mitrovica 39.0°, Gjilan 39.6°, Kamenica 39.7° and Skenderaj 38.7° on 25 July 2025.

=== Liechtenstein ===
Temperatures in Vaduz were forecast to be between 27° and 35° over the next six days from 30 July, along with thunderstorms.

The all-time high was at Vaduz at 36° on 13 August 2003.

=== Lithuania ===
The Lithuanian Hydrometeorological Service anticipated highs of 37° for the weekend of 26–27 June and thunderstorms shortly thereafter. A maximum of 30° for one or two days is the criteria is a notable meteorological event with public health implications; such temperatures for three or more consecutive days is a kaitra, an extreme heat event.

=== Luxembourg ===
A level 3 heatwave alert and 16/06/2026 as temperatures were forecast to reach 39°. The temperature reached 40° on 27 July.

May records were met at several stations run by the Rural Economy and Agriculture Authority on 26 May, though none beat the national May record. On 26 June, 38.6° was recorded at Findel Airport, setting a new maximum temperature record for June. On 27 June, 41.4° was recorded by the Rural Economy and Agriculture Authority. This was a new all-time record for Luxembourg beating 40.8° from 2017.

=== Malta ===
Temperatures were 27° on 14 July and 28.8° on 20 July. A new was record temperature of 43.3° on 19 July. The power supply grid collapsed on 23 July. In August, the month's maximum average temperature was broken and reached around 30°, surpassing August 1999 of 29.3°.

=== Montenegro ===
Animal welfare activists in Montenegro warned of the heat killing animals and pets as temperatures hit 40° in the capital on 30 June.

Temperatures again hit 40° in the capital on 15 July.

==== Subsequent fires ====
A major forest fire hit the Herceg Novi municipality on 29 June.

=== Moldova ===
Moldova experienced "extreme heat" in late June. Emergency shelters were set up by the General Inspectorate for Emergency Situations on 28 June, with 3,567 people receiving assistance there on 28 and 29 June. Rescue workers also distributed 1,133 litres of water.

2,447 people sought assistance in shelters on 29 June in Chișinău and across various districts, such as Anenii Noi, Cahul, Ștefan Vodă, Cantemir, Ialoveni, Căușeni, Hîncești , Leova, Taraclia and Cimișlia. The shelters were in Chișinău on 30 June, in the sectors of Botanica, Rîșcani, Buiucani, Ciocana and Centru.

Emergency medical teams responded to 19 heat-related emergencies between 22 and 28 June. Thirteen people suffered heatstroke, and six cases of syncope were recorded. A yellow heat warning was issued for southern Moldova on 22 June. On 30 June, the same heat warning was issued for northern Moldova, with an orange warning in effect for central Moldova and a red warning in effect for southern Moldova that day.

Villages in Moldova were deserted by noon, and most activities, including farming, had to be done in the morning. Traders and shopkeepers reported a record sale of ice cream, mainly purchased in the evening, when temperatures were lower.

A yellow heatwave warning was issued in Moldova on 4 July, with temperatures reaching 35° in the south.

=== Netherlands ===
In the Netherlands, a heatwave is defined as five consecutive summer days of at least 25°, of which at least three reach tropical-level heat ( 30°). During such occasions, the National Heatwave Plan is activated by Dutch public health institute RIVM, ProRail and the NS runs fewer trains as a precautionary measure. The heat also necessitated water spraying to keep the drawbridges across the canals functioning, as well as preventing road surfaces from thermal buckling. "Winter" salt trucks were also deployed for increasing albedo and lowering the risk of asphalt softening.

==== May ====
On 26 May, the temperature in Ell reached 30.7°, becoming the hottest ever on that calendar day. This was also the third consecutive day with tropical-level heat, thus it classified as the first regional heatwave of 2026.

==== June ====
The first national heatwave, or the second regional heatwave, began on 18 June, when the temperature in De Bilt reached 29.6°. A day later, the temperature in De Bilt rose to 33.4°, marking the first tropical day. After several summer days, the second tropical day followed on 24 June with 34°. As of 29 June, data concluded this as the longest-ever-recorded consecutive heatwave in the Netherlands, lasting 11 days until 1 July. This is also the longest regional "super-heatwave" which lasted six days.

==== July ====
The third regional heatwave began on 13 July. In places like Gilze en Rijen, temperatures crossed the 25.4° threshold, fulfilling the 5-day consecutive warmup requirements for KNMI classification. Further south and east, in Volkel, Horst, Ell, and Maastricht, the mercury surged past 30°. The RIVM national heat plan was also reactivated.

==== August ====
A fourth regional heatwave began on 28 July and ended on 06 August. The KNMI issued a yellow warning for the entire country, as temperatures up to 36° were forecast. The fifth regional heatwave began on 8 August and is as of 14 August still ongoing, equalling the 1947 record of five regional heatwaves in one year. The KNMI issued a yellow warning for the entire country, as temperatures up to 38° were forecast. The ongoing heat in August also broke the 1947 all-time regional record for the most amount of tropical days, with the record currently standing on 31 as of 12 August.

==== Record-breaking statistics ====
Day Temperature Record (De Bilt)
Date	Record	Previous record year	Old record
26 May	30.7°	2005	29.1°
24 June	33.7°	2005	32.6°
25 June	33.1°	1976	32.9°
26 June	36.8°	1976	32.9°

Warmest Nighttime Temperature Record
Record	Date	Location	Previous record	Location	Old record
21.4°	25 June	De Bilt	25 June 2019	De Bilt	19.5°
21.3°	26 June	De Bilt	26 June 1947	De Bilt	17.9°
All-time record of De Bilt			27 July 2018	De Bilt	22.4°
Previous June record of De Bilt			27 June 1947	De Bilt	19.8°
All-time record outside of De Bilt			27 July 2018	Deelen	24.4°

24 June is the sixth-ever recorded day with tropical conditions (above 30°) throughout the country, as well as the first-ever one for June. The night of 24 June was the hottest ever recorded in that month of the year.

KNMI heat-related weather warnings
Date	Code level	Location	Reason/Notes
22–25 June	Yellow	Northern Provinces; Wadden Islands	Risk for localised heat weather hazard
22–25 June	Orange	Rest of the country	Expected temperature up to 36°
26–27 June	Orange	Northern Provinces; Wadden Islands; Zeeland	High chance for heat weather hazard
26–27 June	Red	Rest of the country	Expected temperature up to 40°
26–27 June	Red	Rest of the country	Upgraded from preemptive code orange
26–27 June	Red	Rest of the country	First-ever code red alert for heat
26–27 June	Red	Rest of the country	Except Gelderland, Limburg, North Brabant, and Overijssel, the rest of the country was downgraded to orange on 27 June
10–15 July	Yellow	South Holland; Utrecht; Gelderland; Overijssel; Zeeland; Noord Brabant; Limburg	Expected temperature above 25°
12-16 August	Yellow	All provinces, including Wadden Islands	Expected temperature up to 38 ºC (100 ºF)

On the afternoon of 25 June, the preemptive nationwide code orange of 26 June was upgraded to code red except for the north, Wadden Islands, and Zeeland. The code red alert was extended to 27 June when data suggests that the heat dome shifted later than expected.

On 26 June, KNMI issued level 10 on the heat force scale, the fourth time in De Bilt since the scale's establishment in 1991. This day also classed as the first-ever "super-heatwave" in the Netherlands, wherein the temperature stayed above 35° for three consecutive days. Throughout the week, schools operated on a special heatwave schedule, and on 26 June most of the primary schools and also secondary schools closed due to the extreme heat. Numerous events over the following weekend were suspended, curtailed, or cancelled due to safety regions declaring it unsafe to host any forms of outdoor mass gathering, including the Dutch U18 and U20 athletics championships, and the Defqon.1 music festival in Biddinghuizen.

The all-time record of June dated back to 1947, when it reached 37.9° in Venlo on 27 June, it was broken by 39.4° in Ell on the afternoon of 26 June. Previously, on 25 July 2019, the absolute all-time heat record from 1944 was broken by 40.7° in Gilze-Rijen.

==== Severe thunderstorms ====
===== 19–20 June =====
On the night of 19 June, the frontal system of the approaching heatwave generated a severe thunderstorm that tore through the entire Benelux area. The Netherlands recorded over 188,307 lightning strikes, breaking the all-time daily record. Significant storm damage took place in eastern Groningen. A wedding with 150 guests in Twente was flooded during the ceremony, when a flash flood occurred after a river bank burst. A 25-year-old woman died when a tree fell on her moving car near Coevorden. An NL-Alert was issued the following morning for the overwhelmed emergency service due to the widespread response to the damages to houses and trees.

===== 27–28 June =====
A code orange alert was issued for severe thunderstorm from the afternoon of 27 June to the early morning of 28 June, worse than the night of 19 June due to higher amount of atmospheric energy. Monitors recorded 413,860 lightnings, breaking the record that just set a week ago by more than double. Various regions across the Netherlands were hit with hailstones up to 5 cm. Insurers received many damage reports due to hail and lightning strikes, particularly from the regions around Amsterdam and Utrecht and from Flevoland.

Train traffic experienced various disruptions due to lightning strikes and trees and branches on the tracks. In Gouda, a lightning strike caused serious technical problems, halting all operations between Gouda, The Hague, and Rotterdam. A tram in Scheveningen was hit by a lightning strike and stalled in the middle of an intersection.

Lightning strikes also caused several fires in Amsterdam, Wassenaar, Geldrop, Snelrewaard, Helmond, Landsmeer, Nunspeet, and Beek en Donk, among others. A historic barn at Oldenoordweg in Toornwerd, Groningen caught fire from the lightning strike. In Veldhoven, the historic 1858 windmill of Zilster Molen was torn apart by a strong wind gust, it collapsed onto nearby houses and cars.

Safety regions received an overwhelming amount of damage reports, multiple control rooms were near-capacity. For instance, the Midden- and West-Brabant safety region was so busy that an extra control room was set up at a fire station. People in that region were urged to call the emergency services only in cases of immediate danger, so that the control room remained available for urgent situations. Reports of flash flooding also surged across Dutch cities.

This storm, generated by the front with extreme temperature difference along retreating high-pressure area, marked the end of the June heatwave.

==== Other heat-related disruptions ====
Overall, during the heatwaves, six deaths were caused by accidents during water activities. RIVM attributed approximately 480 excess deaths to heat, which is mostly the elderly population or people with pre-existing health conditions, in the eastern and southern parts of the country. The death toll is expected to rise as reports are still being processed in the coming weeks.

During the June heatwave, there were numerous reports of drawbridge malfunctions across the Netherlands. Many municipalities halted all bridge operations, stranding ship traffic. The railroads also suffered vehicle and infrastructure failures. Various roads across the Netherlands also suffered structural failure due to extreme thermal conditions on 26 and 27 June, necessitating emergency repairs. Dutch energy company Essent reported that residential electricity consumption shot up by 50% during the 11-day-long extreme heat.

The Dutch government declared a drought on 3 August, water levels are the lowest since 1947. On 3 September the national water shortage is officially over, but landscape recovery measures will carry on for the coming months.

=== Norway ===
In Norway, a heatwave is defined as five or more consecutive days of 27° or higher. As of 23 June, such a stretch has not occurred; temperatures have, however, been higher than normal since early June. On 28 June, temperatures in Kongsberg and Nelaug fit the definition of heatwaves in Norway.

Temperatures on 15/07/2026 were at:

- Drammen 33C
- Rjukan 33C
- Kragerø 29C
- Oslo 32C

=== North Macedonia ===
The media issued public health advice on 28 June due to predicted temperatures of 30 ° to 40 °.

The temperature reached around 35 ° in Skopje on 17 July.

=== Poland ===
Given low May rainfall, Poland faced considerably increased risk of wildfires in its forests and national parks as the Omega block moved east. Several municipalities set up water curtains for the public, and Polish State Railways warning of deformed tracks and sagging power lines, offered full refunds for booked weekend travel. On 28 June, 40.5 ° was recorded in Słubice. This is the highest temperature ever recorded in Poland, the previous record being 40.2° in 1921.

On 28 June, it was reported that a woman had died in Chełm due to high temperatures. On the same day, during an edition of the LOTTO PolandBike Marathon held in Marki, two race participants, aged 30 and 71, died after failing to reach the finish line. The body of the first cyclist was discovered later that day a short distance from the race route. The second was found on 29 June following an extensive search involving police, fire brigades, search and rescue teams and drones. Initial reports suggested that the extreme heat, with temperatures reaching nearly 40 °, was a possible contributing factor. The exact circumstances remain the subject of investigation. A 60-year-old man died in a hospital in Konin after suffering from overheating while working on a farm. A 47-year-old woman died while sunbathing in the yard of her home. Overheating is suspected to be the cause of death; this will be investigated.

On 29 June, in Sanok, a 52-year-old man died at work. At the same time, a 90-year-old man died in the hospital in Zielona Góra. The cause of death was likely overheating; doctors recorded a body temperature of 43 degrees Celsius.

=== Portugal ===
Portugal faced the threat of 42 ° high temperatures with yellow weather warnings issued initially only in the districts of Leiria, Lisbon, Santarém, Setúbal, Portalegre, Évora, and Beja, before being expanded to all districts in Portugal due to significant public health concern and "very high" wildfire risks. Continental Portugal experienced nearly nationwide tropical nights, meaning that the daily low temperature was above 20° from the Alentejo to the Algarve. Mora recorded a temperature of 40.3° on 27 May, setting the hottest May record on nationally. In addition, 22 stations recorded the highest maximum-temperature on record, with one on 26 May and the rest on 27 May. Temperatures then hit 44 ° on 1 June.

==== Subsequent fires ====
A large forest fire hit the municipality of Valpaços, Vila Real on 29 July.

Over 14,000 hectares forest burn down in Portugal during July, with the North region hardest hit

=== Romania ===
==== Late May Heatwave ====
On 27 May, 32.8 ° was recorded in Oravița.

==== Late June Heatwave ====
On 28 June, Administrația Națională de Meteorologie (ANM) issued Code Red Heat Warnings for 16 counties. Temperatures hit 39.8 ° in Săcueni. On 29 June, the Code Red Heat Warnings was extended to 35 counties, including the capital city of Bucharest. Temperatures hit 40.6 ° in Jimbolia and Săcueni. On 30 June, the Red Heat Warnings have been extended to 39 counties. Temperatures hit 40.8 ° in Jimbolia and Săcueni. 3 people died due to the heat, including a 56-year-old shepherd from Iași due to prolonged exposure from the sun.

The heatwave triggered intense and deadly thunderstorms. One person died due to the thunderstorms in Găneasa, Ilfov County when a tree crushed a car.

==== Mid July Heatwave ====
On 16 July, Administrația Națională de Meteorologie (ANM) issued Code Yellow Heat Warnings for 4 counties. 36.8 ° was recorded in Sânnicolau Mare. On 18 July, the Code Yellow Heat Warnings were expanded to 7 counties. 37.4 ° was recorded in Calafat. On 19 July, the Code Yellow Heat Warnings were expanded to 15 counties. Temperatures reached 36.9 ° in Calafat. On 20 July, the Code Yellow Heat Warnings were reduced to 10 counties.

==== Late July/Early August Heatwave ====
On 30 July, 37.0 ° was recorded in Arad. On 31 July 38.3 ° was recorded in Sânnicolau Mare. On 1 August, Administrația Națională de Meteorologie (ANM) issued Code Red Heat Warnings for Arad County, Bihor County and Satu Mare County. 39.7 ° was recorded in Săcueni. On 3 August, the Code Red Heat Warning was expanded to 4 counties, with the Timiș County joining the Code Red Heat Warning. 39.5 ° was recorded in Săcueni. On 4 August, the Code Orange Heat Warnings and the Code Yellow Heat Warnings were expanded to the whole country. 39.5 ° was recorded in Săcueni, again. On 5 August, the Code Red Heat Warnings were expanded to 7 counties. Caraș-Severin County, Maramureș County and Sălaj County joined the Code Red Heat Warning. Over three quarters of the country joined the Code Orange Heat Warnings, while the rest of the country were in Code Yellow Heat Warnings. 40.5 ° was recorded in Săcueni. On 6 August, 41.2 ° was recorded in Săcueni.

On 11 August, 39.8 ° was recorded in Săcueni.

On 20 August, 39.0 ° was recorded in Sânnicolau Mare. On 21 August, 40.6 ° was recorded in Moldova Veche.

=== Russia (European and Urals part) ===
An 8 °C (14.4 °F) temperature anomaly hit the central Urals from 4 May to 7 May.

Russia's Hydrometeorological Centre said temperature in Moscow reached 30.6 ° on 12 May and temperatures were forecast to reach 32 ° on 18 May. St. Petersburg hit 30 ° and temperature records were also broken in Kostroma and Perm on 12 May.

A 9 °C (16.2 °F) temperature anomaly hit the Nenets region from 26 May to 3 June.

=== Serbia ===
Serbia's Pančevo refinery, the only oil refinery in the country, cut production by 50% as the Danube shrank to near unnavigable level on 4 August.

=== Slovakia ===
From mid-June, the Slovak Hydrometeorological Institute (SHMÚ) issued repeated high-temperature warnings as the second European heatwave of the season reached Slovakia. First- and second-level alerts were progressively expanded across the Bratislava, Trnava and Nitra Regions and southern districts elsewhere, with third-level warnings later covering large parts of the south-west ahead of the peak. On the night of 27 June the temperature at Bratislava–Koliba fell no lower than 26.3 °, the highest June minimum in the SHMÚ network since at least 1951; further exceptionally warm nights followed.

By late June around 37–44 % of Slovakia was experiencing significant to extreme soil drought. SHMÚ warned of high wildfire risk and the Public Health Authority of the Slovak Republic issued advisories for vulnerable groups, including children, the elderly, pregnant women and the chronically ill. Emergency services recorded hundreds of heat-related collapses; rail lines suffered speed restrictions and track buckling; and animal-welfare incidents were reported. On 29 June a provisional national record of 41.0 ° was measured at the precipitation station in Turňa nad Bodvou, with 40.5 ° to 40.6 ° recorded at several other stations (including Mužla); an IT-system outage at SHMÚ temporarily disrupted real-time data that day. The following day, 30 June, 41.3 ° was recorded at the automatic station in Kamenica nad Hronom. After verification SHMÚ experts formally confirmed the value as the new all-time national record on 9–10 July.

After a cooler period, a second heatwave developed from late July into early August. On 1 August temperatures again reached 40 ° at Štrkovec in the Rimavská Sobota District—the second occasion in a single summer (in two distinct episodes) that the 40 ° threshold had been exceeded, an occurrence unprecedented in the modern observational record. Third-degree heat warnings covered southern regions, with highs oscillating around 40 ° expected to persist into the following working week; drought conditions remained severe in the south and emergency services again recorded dozens of heat-related collapses. On 6 August the meteorological station of Dolné Plachtince had unexpectedly recorded a maximum temperature of 42.2 ° , surpassing the new national record from the day before of 41.3 °. This record was not yet verified by SHMÚ.

=== Slovenia ===
==== May and June ====
Between 25 and 27 May, the Slovenian Environment Agency (ARSO) recorded temperatures above 30 ° at several stations in its network, reaching as high as 33.5 ° at Cerklje ob Krki Airport on 27 May.

According to ARSO's definition, a heatwave in Slovenia is a period of time when there is a minimum of three consecutive days with average temperatures of at least 24 ° in its central and eastern parts or 25 ° in its western parts, respectively. Therefore, the first heatwave to affect the country began on 18 June, when the agency announced that it expected highs above 30 ° to persist for at least 12 days. On 24 June, ARSO reported that the peak of the heatwave was likely to occur on 28 or 29 June. On 27 June, the agency recorded a temperature of 37.4 ° in Dolenje, followed by 37.2 ° in Podnanos, as temperatures rose above 33 ° in almost all lowland areas of Slovenia. Between 27 and 30 June, the highest heat warning issued by ARSO was in effect for most of the country's southwestern areas, whilst the agency's second-highest heat warning was in effect for the rest of Slovenia.

On 28 June, temperatures exceeded 36 ° at several ARSO stations in southwestern and central parts of the country; a temperature of 37.5 ° was recorded in Podnanos, the highest value measured during the heatwave up to that point, and a temperature of 36.9 ° at the agency's station in the Bežigrad District of Ljubljana set a new June temperature record for the capital. On 29 June, eleven ARSO stations measured highs of at least 37.0 °, which included a temperature of 38.7 ° in Podnanos and 38.2 ° in Bilje, respectively. The former set a new June temperature record for Slovenia, surpassing a 2025 record of 38.4 ° in Dobliče and marking the first time since a previous 2022 record of 38.0 ° that the value had been reached in Podnanos in June.

Hot weather continued on 30 June and 1 July, with temperatures in Podnanos reaching 38.1 ° and 36.3 °, respectively, as several ARSO stations in the Vipava Valley measured highs in excess of 34 ° on every day between 18 June and 1 July. Between 28 and 30 June, 20 stations in the agency's network registered highs of at least 36.0 °, with 12 of the 20 stations setting new June temperature records for their respective locations. During the afternoon of 30 June, thunderstorms caused by the heat affected southwestern and central Slovenia, before occurring in various parts of the country the following day, which marked the end of the heatwave.

==== July and August ====
A second heatwave affected Slovenia during the week from 13 to 19 July, but it was less intense and shorter than the first one. Afternoon highs did not exceed 35 ° and thunderstorms were frequent. Because most precipitation since mid-June had been in the form of short-lived, local thunderstorms and downpours, drought was felt in most regions of the country and there was a heightened risk of wildfires for several days.

The third heatwave to affect Slovenia began on 29 July and was initially expected to last at least one week, with its peak likely to occur on 31 July or 1 August, when temperatures were predicted to exceed 35 ° in all lowland areas of the country and reach approximately 39 ° in the Vipava Valley and parts of western Slovenia, as drought and a heightened risk of wildfires persisted in most regions of the country. ARSO later reported that the heatwave was likely to continue until the end of the first week of August and could lead to some places surpassing a 2015 record of 10 consecutive days with highs of at least 35 °.

On 31 July, ARSO measured July temperature records at 28 stations in its network, with 15 of the 28 stations registering the highest temperatures for their respective locations since record-keeping began. The highest temperature of the day was measured in Dolenje near Ajdovščina at 40.0 °, a temperature record for the location and the first time the value had been reached in Slovenia. It was followed by a temperature of 39.6 ° in Podnanos. On 1 August, ARSO measured a temperature of 39.2 ° in Bilje, followed by 39.1 ° in Škocjan and 38.8 ° in Dolenje, with all three locations surpassing their respective August temperature records for the first time since 2017.

On 2 August, temperatures at the ARSO station in Vedrijan did not fall below 28.7 °, which set a new national record for the highest daily low. Around noon that day, a temperature of 40.1 ° was measured at the agency's station in the Markovec area of Koper, surpassing a 2017 record of 38.8 ° for the location, after the bora that had started overnight continued and contributed to an excessively hot morning in the region. Eventually, ARSO registered an average daily temperature of 32.3 ° at the station for 2 August, which was the highest value among the three stations in its network that registered an average daily temperature in excess of 30 ° that day, the other two being Vedrijan and Bilje.

On 5 August, temperatures in Ljubljana reached at least 35 ° for the eighth consecutive day, surpassing a 2013 record of seven consecutive days with such highs measured in the capital. Late in the afternoon, the heat caused the formation of heavy thunderstorms in parts of western Slovenia. Several places at an elevation above 1000|m|ft}} were also affected by the heatwave, with the ARSO station at Rogla, located at 1495|m|ft}} above sea level, registering a daily low of 21 ° between 3 and 4 August to become the highest station in the agency's network to experience a "tropical night".

==== Subsequent fires ====
On 31 July, it was reported that dry terrain and possibly a lightning strike had caused the spread of a forest fire in the Municipality of Bovec, which originally started as an underground fire three days earlier, prompting an all-day firefighting operation that also required a temporary closure of the Mangart Road. Approximately 12|ha|acre}} of forested landscape were affected. On 3 August, it was reported that the forest fire was under control, even though underground fires still required firefighters to monitor the affected area.

On 7 August, a forest fire broke out due to a suspected lightning strike in a remote mountainous area near Kranjska Gora, requiring an aerial firefighting operation, as the affected area was not accessible by road. Although the fire had been contained by 8 August, it reignited and started spreading again on 10 August, requiring the aerial firefighting operation to resume.

=== Spain ===
Temperatures in Spain began rising on 19 May. By 28 May, Santander Airport recorded six days with temperatures higher than 30°. Before then, only two days prior to June had recorded such temperatures. In addition, Badajoz Airport had temperatures over 38° for the first time in May. Temperatures across the southwestern quadrant of Spain recorded highs of 37-39°. Vinebre recorded a temperature of 39.5°, setting the hottest May temperature ever recorded in Catalonia. The Health Ministry recorded 101 heat-related deaths in May, the highest ever recorded for the month of May since records began in 2015.

On 22 June, temperatures peaked at 45.1° in Andújar, southern Spain. Between 21 and 24 June, 108 fatalities were recorded. On 25 June, the Daily Mortality Monitoring System (stylized MoMo) statistically calculated that 212 deaths were linked to the heatwave. By 26 June, 327 heat-related deaths had been registered since 21 June. The Carlos III Health Institute reported at least 1,028 heat-related deaths occurred during the heatwave in June.

Barcelona recorded 40.5° on 8 July, setting the highest maximum temperature since records began. A wildfire broke out on 9 July in southeastern Almería province, killing at least 12 and injuring at least eight, while 23 others are missing.

==== Subsequent fires ====
Antonio Sanz, Andalusia's health and emergencies minister, said on 11 July that a fire had burned it's way across 6,600 hectares (16,300 acres) of Andalusia's land.

A major forest fire at Navaluenga, Ávila, on 22 July

Bush fires threatened Madrid on 24 July.

The arsonist who started the major forest fire at Navaluenga, Ávila, on 22 July; was jailed in 30 July

Spain's prime minister, Pedro Sánchez, raised concerns about climate change after visiting a small town in the southwestern region of Extremadura on 2 August. A man in Madrid died of heat stroke the same day.

Three fires broke out in Huelva province in southwestern Spain between 6 and 7 August and the fire hit the Doñana National Park on 7 August.

Firefighters battled with major wildfires in Castellón on 9 August and Andalusia on 10 August.

=== Sweden ===
Orange warnings were issued for southern Sweden from 25 June onwards as heatwaves moved their way northward from the rest of the continent. Temperatures exceeded 30 degrees for the first time on that day in Ronneby-Bredåkra with 30.6° and have been forecasted to reach up to 35° until 29 June. On 25 June, a 600 m-long freight train derailed on the main route between Göteborg and Borås near Bollebygd because of heat-induced track warping. No one was injured in the accident, and as of 27 June 2026, there was no estimate of when the track would reopen.

=== Switzerland ===
The unusually early heatwave set new daily highs in many stations in the latter part of May. The 0° isotherm, which is to say the freezing level, rose to 4328 m on 25 May, the third highest recorded in May. Biasca recorded 34.8° on 28 May, just 0.3° below the May national record and the highest May temperature ever recorded on the southern side of the Alps. Overall, the month of May was 1.8° above average and the fourth hottest on record.

On 25 June, MétéoSuisse announced they had exceeded 37° in June for the first time since modern records began in 1946, with 38.0° in Basel. This record was broken the following day, 26 June, with 38.8° in Binningen. And on the 27th, Glacier Monitoring (GLAMOS) announced that the second-earliest melt-off of the winter's accumulated ice and snow was expected on Monday. Its records began in 2000, and the earliest previous melt-off was marked on 26 June 2022.

=== Turkey ===
A major temperature increase hits cities across Turkey, including Antalya and Istanbul on 21 June.

==== Subsequent fires ====
A bush fire closed the main road between Fethiye and Antalya and a hospital was evacuated because of a bush fire in Muğla province on 29 July.

Hundreds are Antalya's Kaş district and Muğla province due to nearby wid fires on 30 July.

=== Ukraine ===
As the heat dome shifted eastward into Central and Eastern Europe in late June, Ukraine experienced "intense heat" with temperatures between 35° and 38°, which was warned by the Ukrainian Hydrometeorological Center on 29 June. Residents cooled off in the river, which can be seen en masse in Kyiv at the beaches of the Dnieper River.

The ongoing Russo-Ukrainian war resulted in significant damage to Ukraine's energy infrastructure, the stress on the electricity grid was exacerbated by the heat. Energy rationing and rolling blackouts were implemented by the main operators across several regions on 30 June.

The highest daytime temperatures during the heatwave were concentrated across western and southern Ukraine, culminating on 28 June when Lutsk recorded the country's peak temperature of 36.7 °. In Lviv Oblast, temperatures climbed from 30.2 ° on 25 June to 31.7 ° on 26 June, 32.4 ° on 27 June, and 35.8 ° on 28 June. Similarly, Zakarpattia Oblast also saw consecutive record-breaking days, rising 33.4 ° on 26 June to 34.6 ° on 27 June, and 36.4 ° on 28 June. Other western regions also registered record highs, including Ternopil Oblast at 35.5 °, Khmelnytskyi Oblast at 32.8 °, and Rivne Oblast at 36 ° on 28 June. Record temperatures were established across several oblasts, including Chernivtsi Oblast at 35.9 °, Vinnytsia Oblast at 34.6 °, and Zhytomyr Oblast at 33 °. The heat peaked on 28 June, with Kirovohrad Oblast hitting 35 ° and Odesa Oblast hitting 36.2 °.

On 6 August, temperatures up to 39 ° were recorded in Kyiv and Rivne, with the highest being 40.2 ° in Kamianets-Podilskyi.

=== United Kingdom ===
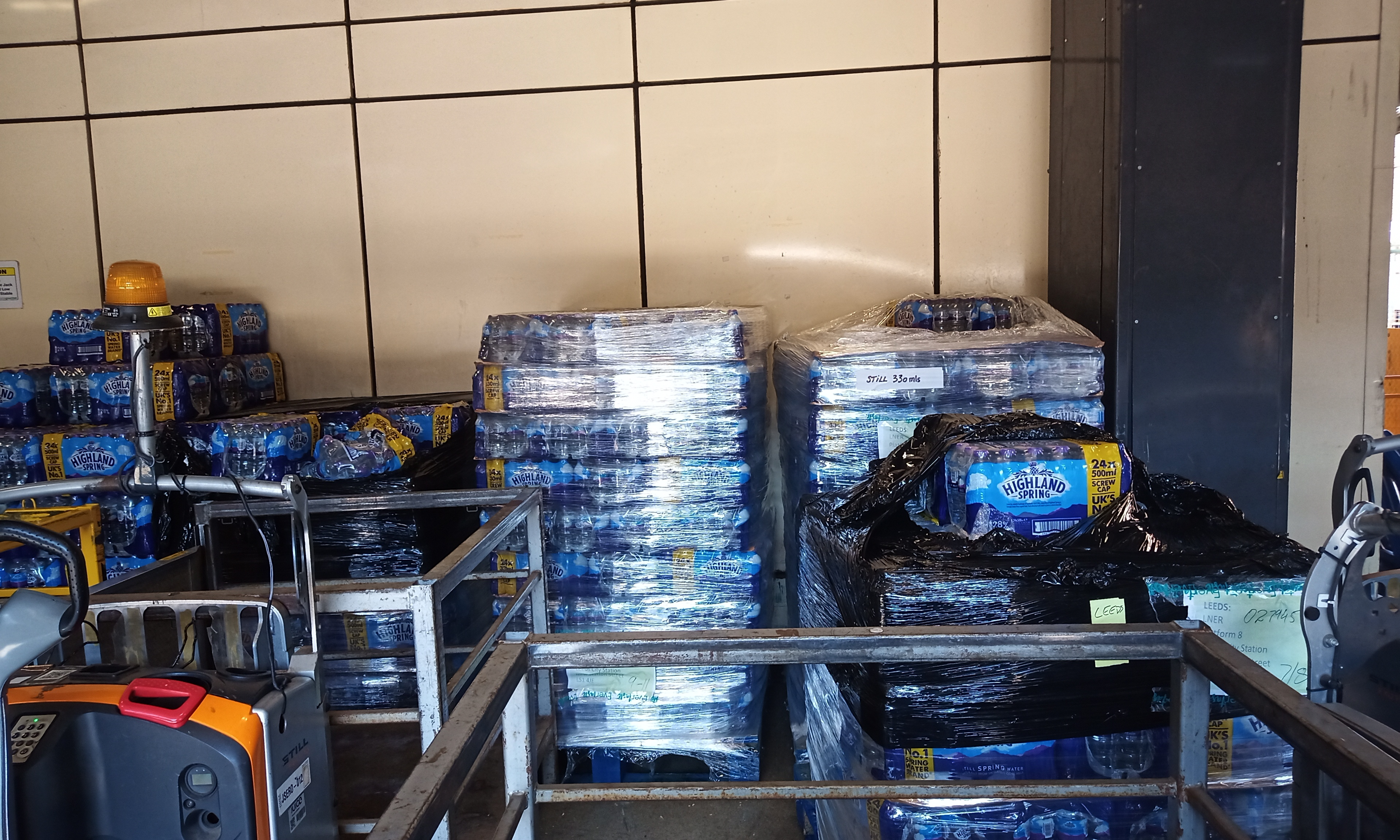
Bottled water for commuters at Leeds City railway station

On 25 May, the highest springtime temperature ever recorded in Great Britain was recorded in Kew Gardens at 34.8 °, exceeding the previous record by over 2|C-change}}. The next day on 26 May, the previous day's record was broken again at Kew Gardens with a reading of 35.1°. The heatwave has led to recorded 34.3° temperatures onboard London Underground trains and stations, and at least 15 people died in water-related incidents across the country.

On 22 June, the Met Office issued a red extreme heat warning for 24 and 25 June, the second time in history that such a warning has been issued. The June temperature record was broken three days in a row from 24 to 26 June. On 24 June, the record was broken in Gosport, Hampshire, with a reading of 36.1°, on 25 June, in Merryfield, Somerset, with a reading of 36.7° and on 26 June, in Lingwood, Norfolk, with a reading of 38.0°. The record before the heatwave was 35.6° set in 1957 and 1976.

The extreme heat was also felt in the Crown Dependencies of Jersey, Guernsey, and the Isle of Man. On 25 June, Jersey reached a temperature of 39.3°. This is the highest temperature ever recorded on the island since records began in 1894.

The record for the highest minimum temperature in Wales for June was broken in Cardiff on the night of 25 June, with a registered temperature of 23.5°.

On 3 July, yellow heat warnings were issued for most of England starting on 4 July. On 6 July, the warnings in the South of England were upgraded to amber from 8 to 12 July. On 9 July, temperatures peaked at 35.5° in Wisley, making it the eighth day of the year when temperatures exceeded 34°, breaking the previous record of seven set in 1976 and equalled in 2020.

On 22 July, supermarkets warned there could be a food shortage later in the year, due to poor crop yields.

From 28 to 30 July, another heatwave affected large parts of the UK, mainly in Southern England. Temperatures peaked at 35° in parts of South East England.

On 30 July, a state of drought was declared across parts of Southern and Western England. Due to the drought, a series of hosepipe bans were announced across Southern England in July and early August, affecting nearly 26 million people.

On 7 August, the Met Office issued a series of high heat alerts across England starting from 9 August. On 13 August, the UK recorded a temperature of 38.2° at Hartpury College, Gloucestershire, which is the hottest day recorded and the joint 4th hottest day ever recorded in the UK, tied with a temperature recorded in Pitsford, Northamptonshire on 18 July 2022.

==== Subsequent wild fires ====
Due to the excessive heat, the number of wildfires has increased drastically, with 1,017 wildfires recorded as of 13 August, according to the National Fire Chiefs Council (NFCC). This is as many wildfires as was recorded in all of 2025. On 14 August, a temporary ban on disposable barbecues was instigated, and an emergency alert was sent to phones in England and Wales to inform people of the threat of wildfires.

=== The Vatican ===
The Vatican, a small enclave inside the city of Rome, was affected similarly to the rest of Rome.

== Highest temperature by country ==
Country	Temperature	Record	Date	Location	Ref(s).
Austria	41.2°	All-time	5 August	Bad Deutsch-Altenburg	
Belarus	40.4°	All-time	29 June	Pinsk	
Belgium	38.4°		26 June	Kleine-Brogel	
Bosnia and Herzegovina	43.0°		6 August	Mostar	
Croatia	41.0°		30 June	Knin	
Czech Republic	41.9°	All-time	28 June	Doksany	
Denmark	37.0°	All-time	27 June	Ødum	
Estonia	29.6°		29 June	Valga	
France	44.3°		23 June	Pissos	
Germany	41.8°	All-time	27 June	Möckern-Drewitz	
Guernsey	36.4°	All-time	25 June	Guernsey Airport	
Hungary	42.0°	All-time	30 June	Szécsény	
Ireland	32.2°		25 June	Athenry	
Italy	48.4°		19 July	Orani, Sardinia	
Jersey	39.3°	All-time	25 June	Mason Saint Louis	
Luxembourg	38.6°	June	26 June	Findel	
Lithuania	36.3°	June	28 June	Druskininkai	
Moldova	41.0°	June	30 June	Cahul	
Netherlands	39.4°	June	26 June	Ell	
Norway	34.2°		15 July	Nesbyen-Todokk	
Poland	40.5°	All-time	28 June	Słubice	
Portugal	44.3°		3 July	Mora	
Portugal	44.3°		3 September	Alcochete	
Romania	41.2°		6 August	Săcueni	
Slovakia	42.2°	All-time	6 August	Dolne Plachtince	
Slovenia	40.1°		2 August	Koper	
Spain	45.7°		3 September	El Granado	
Sweden	36.8°	June	27 June	Osby	
Switzerland	39.0°	June	27 June	Binningen	
Ukraine	40.2°	August	6 June	Kamianets-Podilskyi	
United Kingdom	38.2°		13 August	Hartpury College, Gloucestershire	

== Analysis ==
=== Climate implications ===
Teresa Ribera, a European commissioner, blamed "ideologically driven" falsehoods driven by people with interests in fossil fuels for obstructing EU green policy. Climatologist Friederike Otto commented that "it's climate change [...] not El Niño". Scientists from the World Weather Attribution said that the heatwave was "virtually impossible" without climate change, and that the concurrent El Niño weather pattern "did not contribute" to the severe heat.

The extreme heat set the backdrop for a special address by UN secretary-general António Guterres at London Climate Week on 23 June:

We have just lived through the eleven hottest years ever recorded. Climate disasters are becoming more frequent, more destructive, and more costly. And the World Meteorological Organization has warned we ain't seen nothing yet. El Niño is not just knocking on the door. It risks blowing the house down. Turning up the heat. Disrupting food and water systems. And hitting the vulnerable the hardest.

=== Infrastructure ===
Heat-induced bending of rail tracks and catenary wires prompted many cancellations, particularly in France and Belgium. Much of Europe's train network was not designed for the high heat.

=== Air conditioning ===
The politicisation of air conditioning reignited, with right-wing politicians in multiple countries championing the technology and characterising resistance to its adoption as a misguided left-wing project. French right-wing politician Marine Le Pen vowed to "put into place a massive air-conditioning plan" if elected president of France; conversely, left-wing politician Jean-Luc Melenchon declared: "I won't put my kid or my granddaughter or my great-granddaughter somewhere with air conditioning from morning to night!" The centre-left government of Ghent initially advised residents to "avoid air-conditioners", but removed the advice after an enquiry from the New York Times. CNN reported that mass adoption of air conditioning could set the European Union back from its goal of climate neutrality by 2050. Energy cost also presents a significant barrier to wider adoption, and 38% of respondents to an EU-wide survey said they could not afford to cool their homes. Many train cancellations were prompted by a lack of air conditioning. Because the windows of many trains do not open, a disabled train in high heat presents a dangerous situation as it may not occur to passengers to avail themselves of emergency window breakers to prevent deaths on board.

The lack of air conditioning in some European countries baffled many Americans. Similarly, Chinese social media contrasted the situation in Europe with the one in China, where air conditioning is so widely adopted that it is even used in barns and pig stalls. Focusing on France, some commentators diagnosed a supposed French psychological propensity to embrace suffering, which led to recriminations that the prevalence of air conditioning in the United States evinced greed or decadence. Le Monde noted that air conditioning is widely viewed in France as a maladaptation to climate change, but that the 2026 heatwave engendered more public discussion of the role of air conditioning in the country. French resistance toward air conditioning may be influenced by a superstition of choc thermique ("thermal shock"), the supposed tendency for air conditioning to cause fainting, nausea, or viral illness by virtue of the temperature differential moving from outdoors to indoors. The superstition was promoted by French media organisations. Furthermore, a superstition persists in Europe more widely that cold air causes illness; in reality, illnesses such as influenza and colds are caused by viruses.

=== Excess mortality trends ===
Scientists at Indiana University made preliminary estimates of excess mortality related to the heatwave, based on data from past heatwaves such as the 2025 European heatwaves. The previous 2025 heatwaves were associated with 16,500 excess deaths. The team estimated that in the 2026 heatwaves were associated with 20,390 excess deaths (95% confidence interval: 17,201–25,141), but cautioned that estimates are subject to change. An alternative preliminary estimate by a researcher at Poznań University of Medical Sciences puts the excess mortality at 15,000. The European subcontinent has more heat deaths per capita than any other landmass.

== See also ==
- Climate change in Europe
- Coolcation – Holiday to cooler places to avoid the heat
- 2025 European heatwaves
- European heatwave
- 2026 European drought
- List of heat waves
  - 2026 North American heat wave
