= Politics of air conditioning =

There is a political controversy about air conditioning, especially in Europe and South Asia, partly due to the cost of electricity, unit prices, and the cost for governments to upgrade electrical grids. There have been protests against power cuts in India, Pakistan and Bangladesh.

Europe is getting hotter faster than other continents, and in the 2020s Europe suffered many deaths due to the lack of air conditioning: less than a quarter of households had it. Air conditioning is an important part of adapting to climate change.

In the United States, where air conditioning is widely adopted, political energy revolves around inequality in who has access to air conditioning. Air conditioning is also viewed as a necessity in Southeast Asia. But as green policies move forward, local discussions are now focusing on how to set the right temperature and exactly when or how many people are needed to turn it on. Meanwhile, in Northeast Asian countries with four distinct seasons, newer HVAC technology that generates heat in winter and functions as air conditioning in summer have drawn significant attention. While governments claim it is necessary to phase out inefficient cooling units and kerosene heaters, whether society can bear the costs of mandatory upgrades for environmental causes has also become a focal point of public debate. In South American countries like Venezuela, electricity is often rationed. This leads to mandatory decreases in air conditioning usage due to its power draw, which is met with controversy.

== Background ==
Socioeconomic groups with an annual household income below around $10,000 (circa 2021) tend to have a low rate of air conditioning adoption, which worsens heat-related mortality. The lack of cooling can be hazardous, as areas with lower use of air conditioning correlate with higher rates of heat-related mortality and hospitalizations. Premature mortality in New York City is projected to grow by between 47% and 95% in 30 years, with lower-income and vulnerable populations most at risk. Studies on the correlation between heat-related mortality and hospitalizations and living in low socioeconomic locations can be traced in Phoenix, Arizona; Hong Kong; China; Japan; and Italy. Costs of health care can act as another barrier: the lack of private health insurance during a 2009 heat wave in Australia was associated with heat-related hospitalization.

Disparities in socioeconomic status and access to air conditioning are connected by some to institutionalized racism, which leads to the association of specific marginalized communities with lower economic status, poorer health, residing in hotter neighborhoods, engaging in physically demanding labor, and experiencing limited access to cooling technologies such as air conditioning. A study examining the US cities of Chicago, Detroit, Minneapolis, and Pittsburgh found that black households were half as likely to have central air conditioning units when compared to their white counterparts. Especially in cities, redlining and other historical practices mean that racial disparities are also played out in heat islands, increasing temperatures in certain parts of the city. This is due to heat-absorbing building materials and pavements and lack of vegetation and shade coverage. There have been initiatives that provide cooling solutions to low-income communities, such as public cooling spaces.

Cooling has allowed for growth of indoor home space and has encouraged people, including children, to stay indoors more often. It has also created uniformity of different geographical areas and climate zones.

== By country ==
=== France ===
Air conditioning is rare in France. As of August 2025, the only major party to explicitly support the mass adoption of air conditioning is France's right-wing populist National Rally, with leader Marine Le Pen calling on the nation to have a plan to widely adopt air conditioning in the coming years. Additionally, when faced with criticism online for lack of air conditioning during a heatwave in June 2026, Deputy Mayor Audrey Pulvar of Paris made comments condemning the United States' usage of air conditioning. Pulvar wrote, "As the second-largest emitter of greenhouse gases in the world, you bear a significant amount of the responsibility for global warming and the consequences we, in France, are experiencing."

=== Germany ===
Germany has a temperate climate characterised by a lack of large periods of specifically hot or cold weather. By 2021, only 3% of households owned air conditioning, but the market for air conditioning had grown by 8% in 2020.

Traditionally, the Greens prefer passive solutions rather than air conditioning. For example in 2025 the Greens in the Karlsruhe City Council adopted a heat action plan that promoted measures of building design, shading, and ventilation, which drew criticism from the city's Young Union, the joint youth organisation of the CDU/CSU, which argued that "Effective air conditioning instead of green heat dogmas is needed in Karlsruhe". In 2026, Katharina Dröge, the co-chair of the Green Party's parliamentary group in the Bundestag, proposed a funding programme for "climate‑solar systems": air conditioning systems tied with simultaneous installation of solar cells on the roof. Dröge called this combination the "most sensible" and criticised the inertia of Friedrich Merz's government. The far-right Alternative for Germany (AfD) touted a massive roll-out of air conditioning while still rejecting heat pumps (which they call "heizhammer", the heating hammer).

=== India ===
India has a tropical monsoon climate throughout most of its non-Himalayan region, with heat described as oppressive. Temperatures regularly reach 38–48 °C (100–118 °F). Protesters have accused the government of favoring richer customers when supplying electricity. Electricity in the country is government-controlled and subsidised. However, 87% of the electricity is allocated towards households above the poverty line, while more than 50% of electricity subsidy payments are allocated towards the richest two-fifths of households. Meanwhile, 8 to 10 percent of Indian households have an air conditioning unit, but that number is set to increase by 5 times to 50% by 2037. However, increased access to air conditioning for wealthier households feeds concerns about increasing inequalities.

=== United Kingdom ===
The climate of the United Kingdom is temperate, and the installation rate of home air conditioning systems had historically been low. In June 2025, the director of the Air Conditioning Company in London said that demand for portable air-conditioning units had increased by 625% compared to the previous year. The homeware retail chain Robert Dyas said that from 2019 to 2024, its stores had seen a 4,000 percent increase in the sale of fans and air-conditioning units.

The Telegraph has criticised planning rules requiring commercial properties and some blocks of flats having to obtain planning permission. The Liberal Democrats say that air conditioning should be mandatory in schools and health facilities and when new houses are built. In 2026 the Labour government removed VAT on electricity. Additionally, in July 2026, a new draft of a plan to implement air conditioning in buildings like schools, care homes and hospitals was set forth by the London mayor's office. The previous plan had mentioned that air conditioning was "not ideal," but the new outline specifically mentions that the new plan would not prohibit the installation of air conditioning in the aforementioned buildings if implemented.

=== United States ===
As of 2020, 88% of US households had some form of air conditioning, with prevalence being highest in the Midwestern and Southern United States. Within metropolitan areas, air conditioning is more prevalent in suburbs than the urban core, even though temperatures in the core tend to be elevated due to the heat island effect.

In many parts of the US, state or local laws require landlords to heat rental properties above a specified minimum temperature during winter months; however, relatively few jurisdictions have corresponding laws to cool properties below a maximum temperature during summer months. Moreover, some landlords entirely ban air conditioning from their rental properties, although some municipalities have passed laws to forbid this.

During the 2026 North American heat wave, New York City mayor Zohran Mamdani announced that "The best protection against extreme heat is air conditioning", and activated air conditioned cooling centres in the city. Mamdani, a Democratic Socialist, advised residents to keep air conditioners set to no lower than 26 °C (78 °F). Conservative politicians in the US states of Kentucky and Florida declared it evidence of communism; another charged Mamdani with waging "war against women in menopause". Journalists claimed that similar thermostat recommendations had been published by conservative-led US state governments, and also the Trump government, which did not respond to press inquiries on the matter and deleted the recommendation.

=== Venezuela ===
Venezuela's climate is tropical and subtropical in its non-mountainous areas, with average annual temperatures up to 25 °C (77 °F) in Caracas and up to 35 °C (95 °F) in more tropical areas like Ciudad Bolivar and Maracaibo. Despite its possession of the largest proven oil reserve in the world, Venezuela has faced issues regarding the supply of electricity to its citizens, increasingly using power cuts to mitigate electricity usage. Nearly 63% of Venezuelan households report that they underwent daily electricity cuts in 2026, which is an increase of 26% from the 37.1% figure reported in 2024. Additionally, the percentage of households with a continuous supply of electricity was 6.9%. In March of 2026, the nation's Ministry of Electric Energy announced a plan to ration electricity during a period where the demand for cooling would significantly increase usage, with measures including urging citizens to turn their air conditioning to temperatures no lower than 21 °C (70 °F) and to cease usage of high energy appliances. Many complain that without air conditioning, it is difficult to sleep in the Venezuelan heat.

== See also ==
- Refrigerants with very low climate impact
- Decarbonisation of the global energy system
