= 2026 North American heat wave =

Meteorological history
- Duration: June 28, 2026 – September 19, 2026
- Heatwave
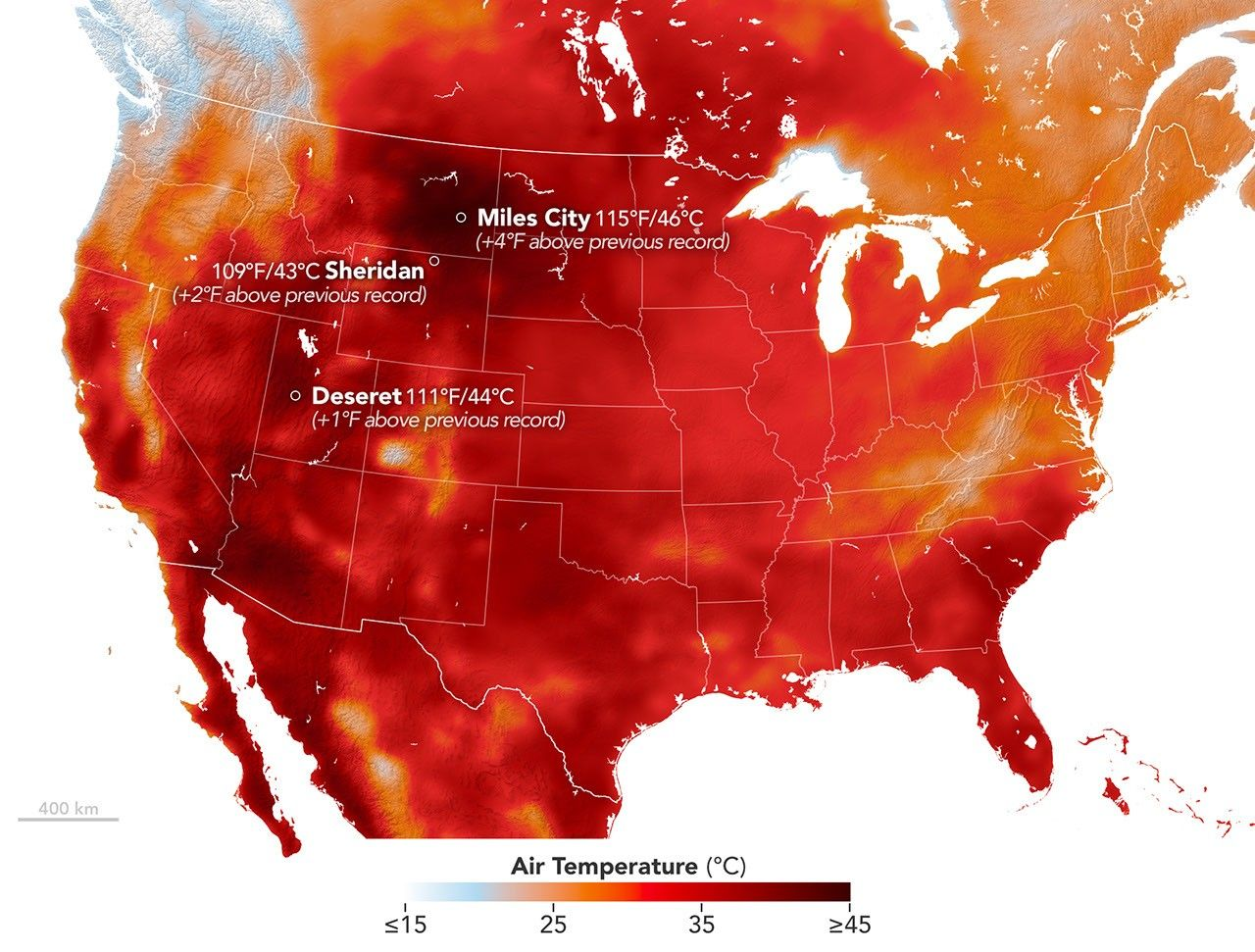
- Air temperatures on July 12 for the region

Overall effects
- Fatalities: 70
- Areas affected: United States: Continental United States; Alaska; Canada

From June 2026 until late September 2026, North America was struck by a severe heatwave. Temperature records were tied or broken in several major cities across the United States and Canada. In Canada, the extreme heat brought large thunderstorms on July 1, Canada Day, which contributed to widespread flooding and thousands of homes being without power. In the United States, the extreme conditions strained public services, including public transit and the power grid, with delays and hundreds of thousands of homes without power for part of the heat wave.

The initial heat dome existed over the eastern United States and eastern Canada from June 28 until July 5; a peak of 106 °F (41 °C) was recorded in Atlantic City, New Jersey, on July 4. A second heat dome is forming over the western half of the continent, with heat advisories currently in the southwest United States and Alaska. As of August 5, 2026, there have been 70 deaths attributed to this heatwave.

This heatwave was concurrent with the FIFA World Cup, United States' Independence Day, and Canada Day, resulting in participants having to be in shade and hydrate frequently.

== Background ==
On June 11, the United States's National Weather Service found El Niño conditions were present, with the possibility of a "Super El Niño" as the year goes on. Climate scientists predict that with these 2026–2027 El Niño conditions, there would be higher temperatures and more of a likelihood of heat waves. CNN has stated that El Niño and human-caused climate change both contribute to the increased severity of heat waves.

== Canada ==
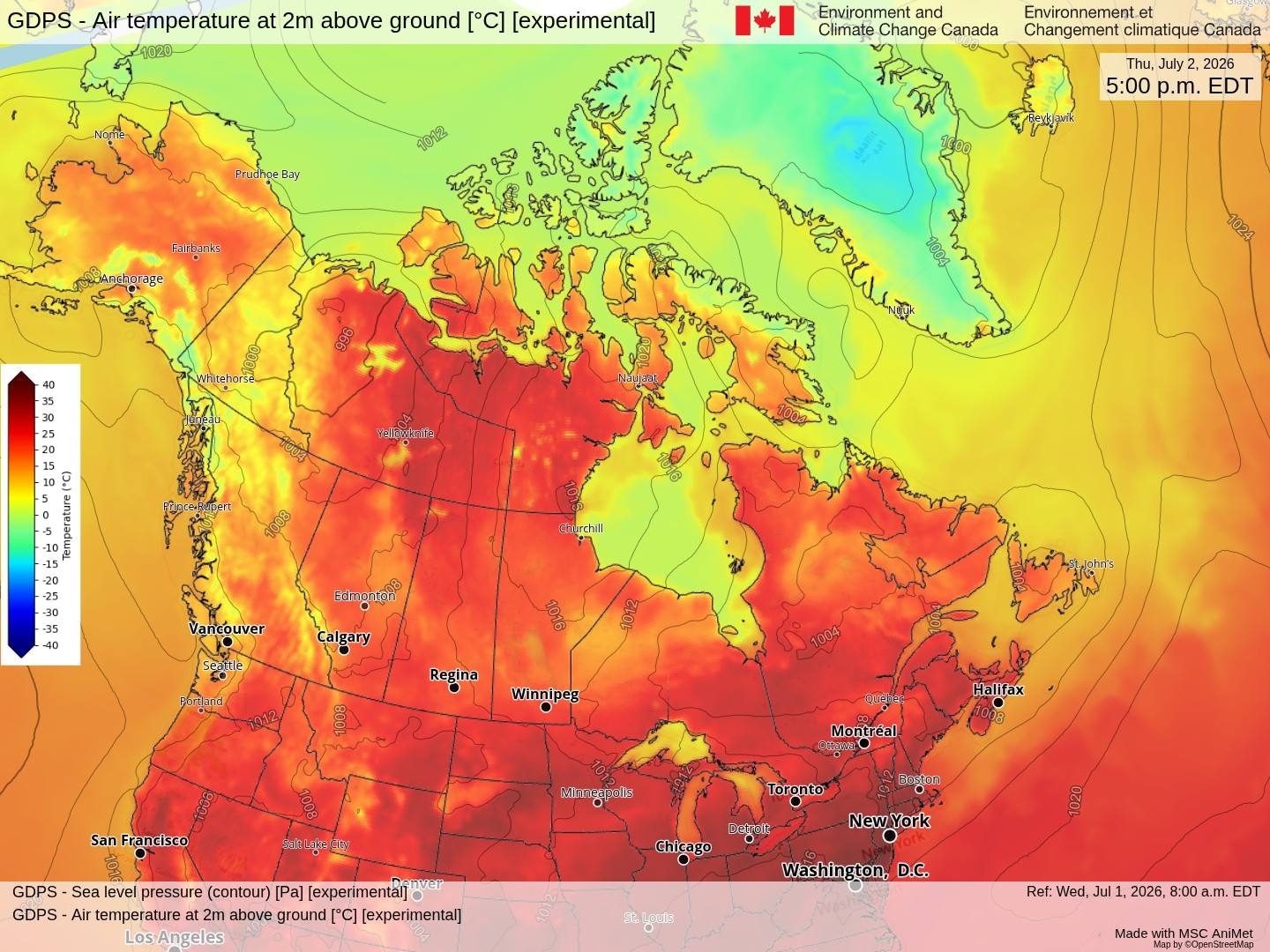
Weather forecast for July 2, 2026, showing very high temperatures in Ontario and Quebec

Canada Day storm damage in Ottawa.

=== Eastern Canada ===
In Canada, Ontario and Quebec were under "orange" or "yellow" heat warnings, with temperatures expected to reach upwards of 37 °C (99 °F) in some areas. Record high temperatures affected much of Ontario and Quebec on July 1, with a humidex of 46 °C (115 °F) recorded in Ottawa. This extreme heat eventually led to large thunderstorms on July 1, and caused widespread flooding and storm damage across Ontario and Quebec, with a record 118 mm (4.6 in) of rain in Ottawa. Many Canada Day celebrations in the National Capital Region had to be cancelled. In Quebec, 100,000 homes supplied by Hydro-Québec lost power on July 2. By the next morning, 50,000 homes still were without power. During peak heat of 30 °C (86 °F) with a humidex of 36 °C (97 °F), roughly 44,000 customers lost power in Halifax on July 3. On July 4, the Winterland area in Newfoundland set a daily high 25.7 °C (78.3 °F), surpassing the record set in 2005.

Ontario recorded the highest temperature since the 1936 North American heat wave on July 13. Armstrong set a new all-time high 40.7 °C (105.3 °F). Toronto recorded its hottest day since 2011 on July 14. Late on July 14, a cold front moved through southern Ontario bringing temperatures back down.

=== Western Canada ===
With the heat dome in the eastern half of the country over, a second heat dome formed over much of the western United States and Canada. Seven communities set new records while four others had tied temperature records in Manitoba on July 12, the hottest being McCreary which set a new record of 36.5 °C (97.7 °F). On July 22, twelve communities in British Columbia broke daily heat records. Among them was Lytton, which recorded a temperature of 41.2 °C (106.2 °F).

=== Northern Canada ===
Daily temperature records were set in Nunavut on July 4. Cambridge Bay broke the record set in 1930, recording 22.1 °C (71.8 °F). Kugaaruk set a temperature record of 27.5 °C (81.5 °F).

== United States ==
With an average temperature of 76.89 °F (24.94 °C), July 2026 was the hottest month in American history. The summer also finished as the hottest on record for the US.

=== Eastern United States ===
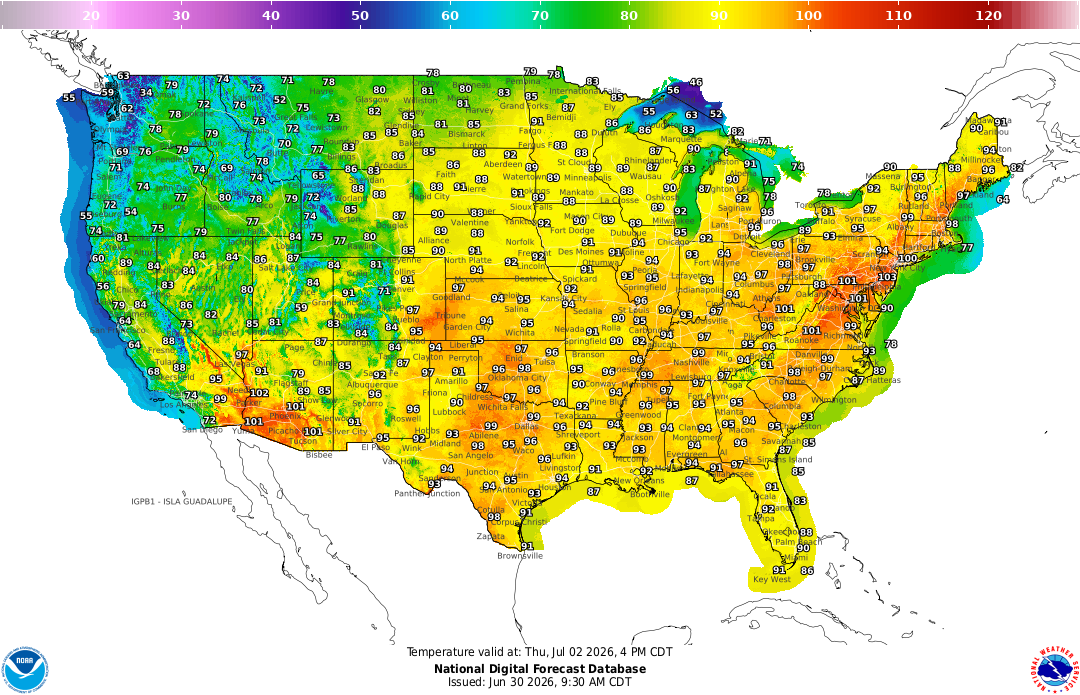
Weather forecast for July 2, showing extreme high temperatures in many areas of the Eastern United States

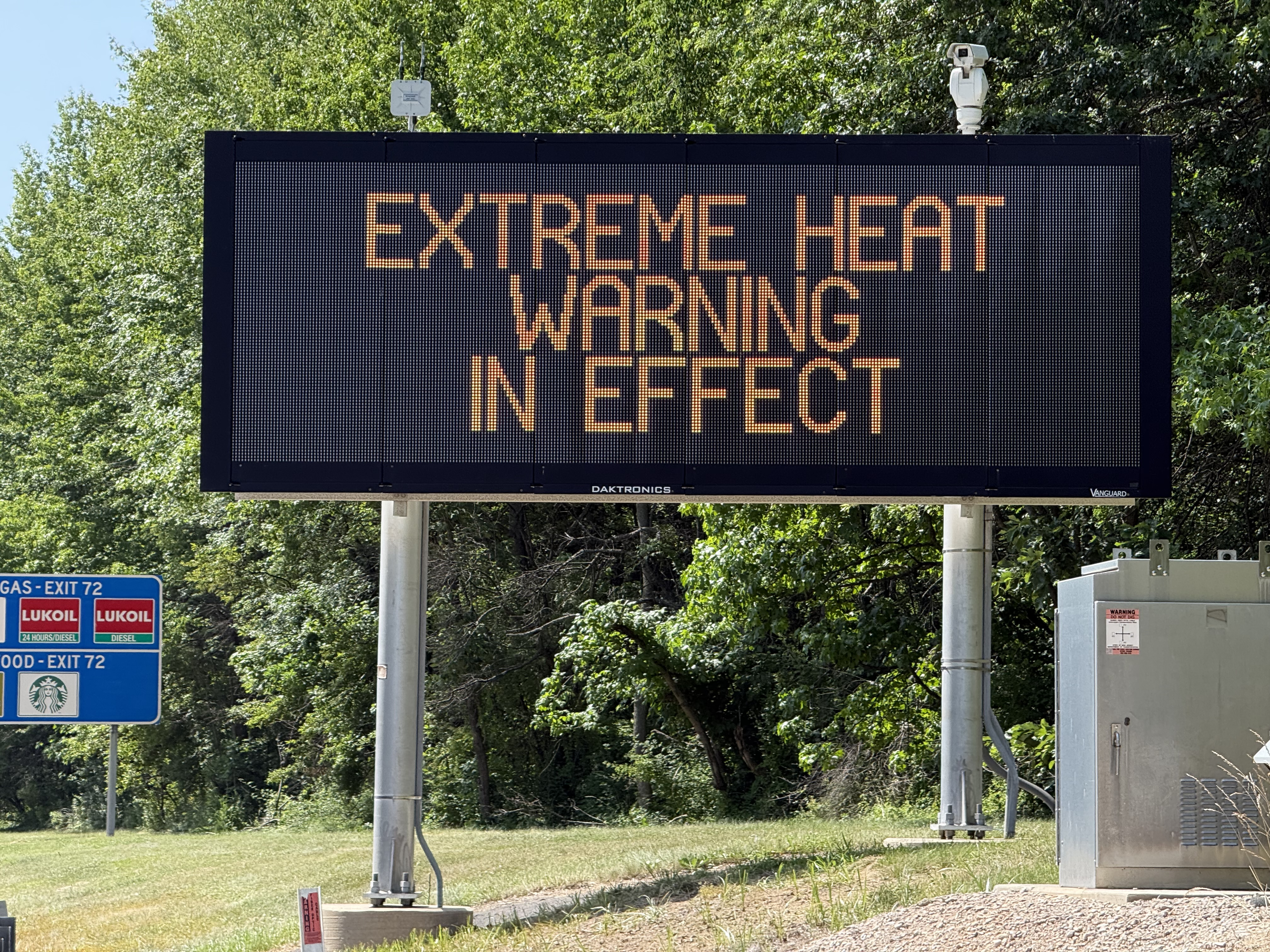
Road sign in New Jersey warning of excessive heat during the hottest day in 15 years, July 2, 2026

Nearly half of the United States, 180 million people, were under a "major" or "extreme" heat risk by the National Weather Service starting on June 28. Temperatures were expected to reach between 100–110 °F (38–43 °C) in many areas. On June 29, the heat index measured at O'Hare International Airport in Chicago was 101 °F (38 °C). The next night, the low temperature was just 81 °F (27 °C) in La Crosse, Wisconsin, tying the all-time record warm low temperature. On July 2, ambient temperatures in New York City exceeded 100 °F (38 °C) for the first time since 2012. Boston also reached 100 °F (38 °C) that day, setting a new daily high temperature record and marking the 29th time the city reached the century mark. Amtrak reduced speeds for trains in the Northeast Corridor due to the extreme heat, and several trains were cancelled as well. SEPTA and NJ Transit also faced delays and cancellations due to the heat. The heat wave resulted in a fatality in Bethel Township, Pennsylvania. Additionally, over 17,000 customers lost electricity in New York City during the heat wave. PJM Interconnection, which serves power to 67 million people, got near, if not surpassed, its record for power demand, which was previously set in 2006 at 165 gigawatts. Surging electrical demand as a result of higher temperatures along with loads from data centers. The US Department of Energy ordered all electrical generators to run at full capacity, even backup units, for the second time this summer.

On July 3, following another day of record heat across New Jersey, including Atlantic City, severe thunderstorms in the state resulted in 250,000 power outages. This resulted in many people being unable to use air conditioning. The storms also amplified issues on NJ Transit from heat, forcing additional delays and suspensions.

The heat wave coincided with the US Independence Day on July 4, causing many celebration plans to be canceled, especially in the eastern portion of the country. Parades were canceled or delayed in Washington, DC, Philadelphia, and elsewhere.

Due to the heat wave during July 1–4, at least 44 heat-related fatalities were reported: 29 in New Jersey, 7 in Pennsylvania, 4 in Illinois, 3 in New York, and one in Mississippi. In addition, one heat-related death occurred in Mississippi on June 27.

From July 4–6, several rounds of severe thunderstorms moved across the United States that broke up the heat dome. However, those storms resulted in over 1.3 million power outages and four fatalities. The storms that broke the heat wave also led to the largest hailstone in Connecticut state history.

Record heat returned to the region on July 15, when Lehigh Valley International Airport recorded a high temperature of 98 °F (37 °C), tying the daily record. Heating was limited on July 16, however, due to smoke from the 2026 Canadian wildfires.

During Tropical Storm Bertha, southern Louisiana was placed under both a tropical storm warning and extreme heat warning for the first time since 2005. Lake Charles recorded a heat index of 121 °F (49 °C).

A third major July heat dome began to impact the United States late in the month. Around 70 million were under heat advisories. Heat indexes of over 100 °F (38 °C) extended from Minnesota to Mississippi. An all-time record high of 112 °F (44 °C) was reported at the Rapid City Regional Airport, South Dakota, on July 26.

Extreme humidity surged into the Northeastern United States on August 7. New York City reached a dew point of 79 °F (26 °C), just one degree shy of the all-time record.

=== Western United States ===
Following the advent of the heat dome in the eastern United States, a second heat dome started to form across the western and central United States on July 6. Phoenix, Arizona, reached a high of 113 °F (45 °C) on July 6–8. Salt Lake City, Utah, recorded a new all-time high on July 12, reaching 109 °F (43 °C). Also in Utah, the temperature in Deseret reached an all-time high of 111 °F (44 °C). Additionally, local all-time records were set when Miles City, Montana, reached 115 °F (46 °C) and Sheridan, Wyoming, reached 109 °F (43 °C).

The third major heat dome affected the Southwest in late July, with heat indexes of over 100 °F (38 °C) in southern California and Nevada. Temperatures of up to 118–120 °F (48–49 °C) were recorded. Across the west on August 1, there were 65 records that were either tied or set new records. In southern Nevada, emergency daytime cooling stations opened from August 6-11.

In early August, extreme heat in Colorado resulted in 72 hospitalizations.

== Highest temperatures recorded ==
Country	Location	Temperature	Record	Date	Ref(s).
United States	Atlantic City	106 °F (41 °C)	All-time (tied)	July 4	
United States	Washington, D.C.	102 °F (39 °C)	Daily	July 2	
United States	Philadelphia	103 °F (39 °C)	Daily (tied)	July 2	
United States	Boston	101 °F (38 °C)	Daily	July 2	
United States	Wilmington	101 °F (38 °C)	Daily	July 2	
United States	New York City	100 °F (38 °C)	Daily (tied)	July 2	
United States	Toledo	99 °F (37 °C)	Daily	July 1	
United States	Phoenix	113 °F (45 °C)	None	July 6–8	
United States	Salt Lake City	109 °F (43 °C)	All-time	July 12	
United States	Deseret	111 °F (44 °C)	All-time	July 12	
United States	Billings	111 °F (44 °C)	All-time*	July 12	
United States	Miles City	115 °F (46 °C)	All-time	July 12	
United States	Sheridan	109 °F (43 °C)	All-time	July 12	
Canada	Toronto	36 °C (97 °F)	Daily	July 1	
Canada	Armstrong	40.7 °C (105.3 °F)	All-time	July 13	
Canada	Winterland	25.7 °C (78.3 °F)	Daily	July 4	
Canada	Kugaaruk	27.5 °C (81.5 °F)	Daily	July 4	
Canada	McCreary	36.5 °C (97.7 °F)	Daily	July 12	
Canada	Lytton	41.2 °C (106.2 °F)	Daily	July 22	

- The National Weather Service and ABC News stated the 111 °F (44 °C) measurement in Billings, Montana, on July 12, 2026, was an all-time heat record, despite a 112 °F (44 °C) measurement in Billings on July 31, 1901.

== See also ==
- 2026 European heatwaves – co-occurring heatwaves
