= Administrația Națională de Meteorologie =

Administrația Națională de Meteorologie or ANM is the Romania government facility of weather prediction. The organisation's headquarters are in Bucharest. The organisation was founded in late 18th century. In 1948, Romania ratified the 1947 Washington Convention, turning from a founding member to a full member of the World Meteorological Organization (18 August 1948). Since 2003, it is a member of EUMETSAT with a stake of 0.4456%. Today in Romania, ANM holds the monopoly for meteorological prediction because the state doesn't allow a private carrier in this field. Even if ANM holds monopoly on Romanian market, international media holdings and websites are usually using satellite prediction and the predictions of other meteorological institutions of Romania's neighbors. It is operated by Romanian Ministry of Environment.
