= Coolcation =

Holiday to cooler places to avoid the heat

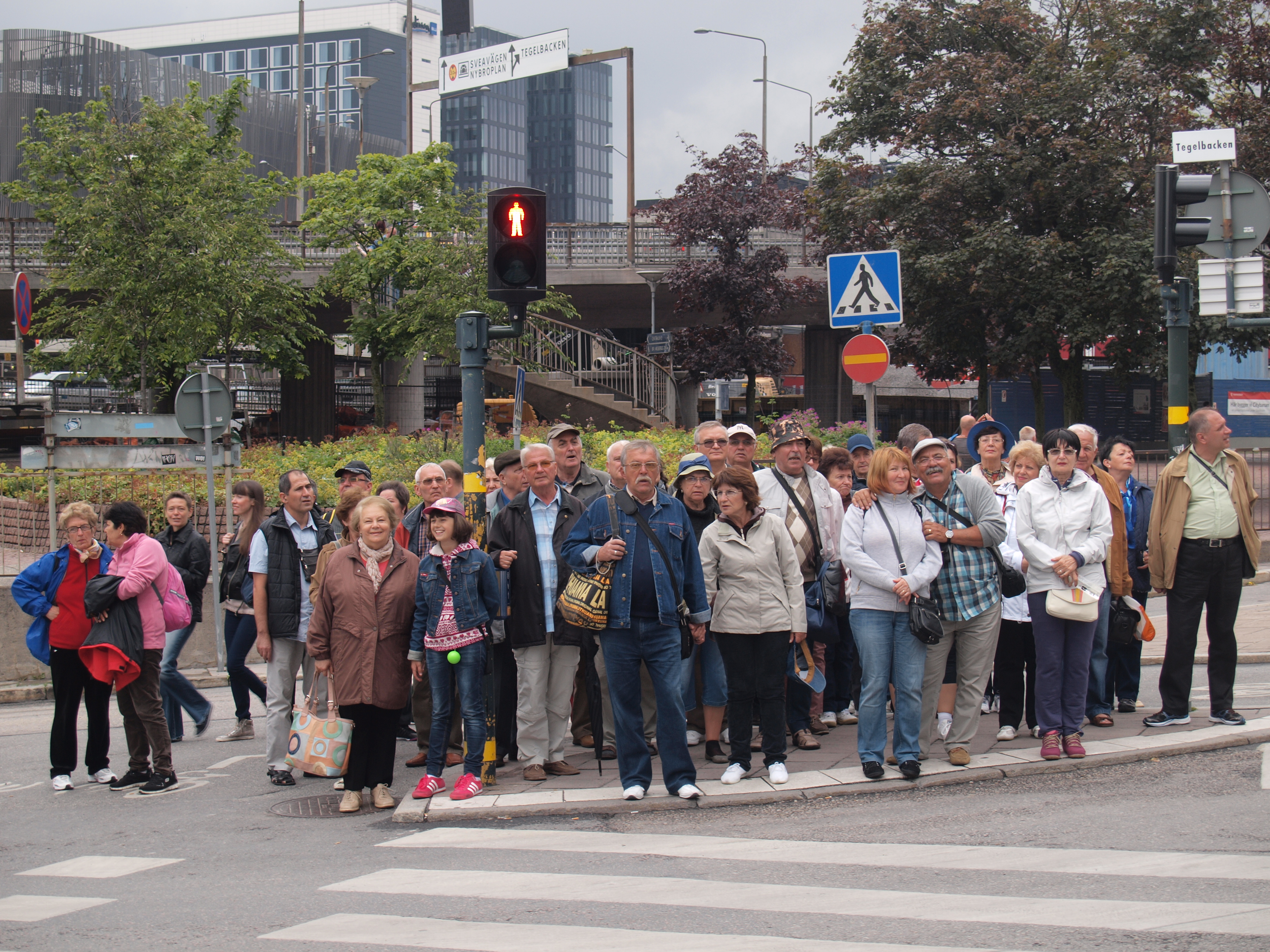
A group of tourists in Stockholm, Sweden in June 2014

Coolcation (a portmanteau of cool and vacation) is an English-language term referring to a holiday spent in a more northerly and cooler location due to global warming. In the 2020s, the term has been used in marketing, particularly by Nordic tourism operators and tourism promotion agencies.

The "coolcation" trend is driven by a growing number of travelers seeking cooler, quieter destinations to escape heatwaves and wildfires that have become increasingly frequent in the 2020s—particularly in Southern European countries such as Spain, Italy, Greece, and Portugal. According to a report by the European Commission, climate change is likely to significantly shift tourism patterns within Europe over the course of this century; as southern regions become increasingly hot and uncomfortable, tourism will increasingly migrate northward, particularly to the Nordic countries, the British Isles, or Canada.

The trend has also raised ethical questions. Although Finland, among other places, could be considered a "coolcation" destination due to its relatively cool summer climate, only Levi has notably marketed itself using this concept; conversely, Helsinki has not used the term in its marketing, as it does not consider the trend to align with its values regarding sustainable development.
