= Kamenica nad Hronom =

Kamenica nad Hronom Garamkövesd
- Municipality
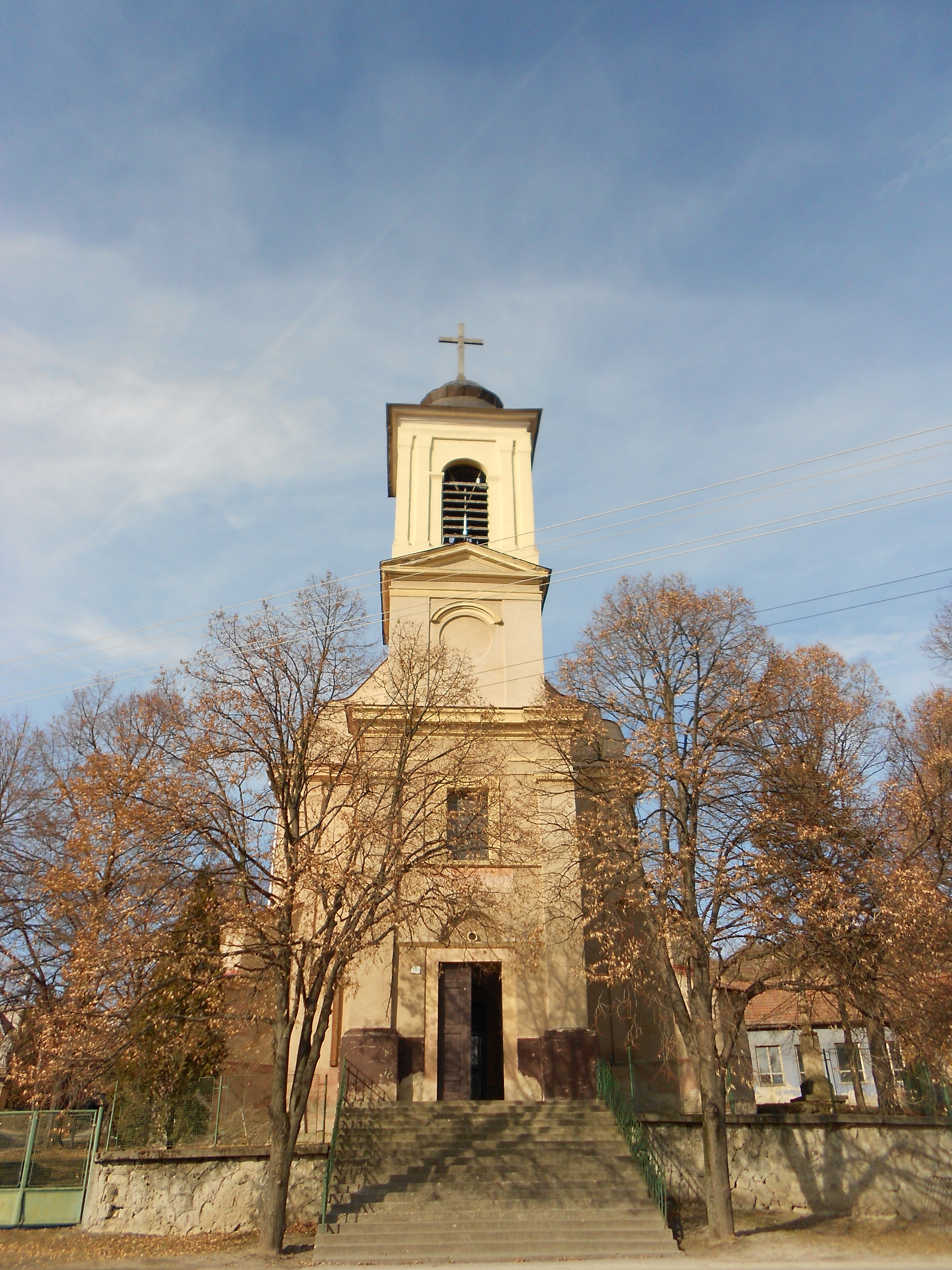
- Catholic Church in the village

- Flag

- Location of Kamenica nad Hronom in the Nitra Region Location of Kamenica nad Hronom in Slovakia
- Coordinates: 47.83°N 18.73°E
- Country: Slovakia
- Region: Nitra Region
- District: Nové Zámky District
- First mentioned: 1156

Government
  - Mayor: Ján Elzer

Area
  - Total: 18.79 km^{2} (7.25 sq mi)
- Elevation: 132 m (433 ft)

Population (2025)
  - Total: 1,217
- Time zone: UTC+1 (CET)
  - Summer (DST): UTC+2 (CEST)
- Postal code: 943 65
- Area code: +421 36
- Vehicle registration plate (until 2022): NZ
- Website: kamenicanadhronom.sk

Kamenica nad Hronom (Hungarian: Garamkövesd) is a municipality and village in the Nové Zámky District in the Nitra Region of south-west Slovakia.

== Geography ==
The municipality lies at an altitude of 132 metres (433 ft) and covers an area of 18.79 km^{2} (7.25 sq mi) (2025).

== History ==
In historical records the village was first mentioned in 1156. After the Austro-Hungarian army disintegrated in November 1918, Czechoslovak troops occupied the area, later acknowledged internationally by the Treaty of Trianon. Between 1938and 1945 Kamenica nad Hronom once more became part of Miklós Horthy's Hungary through the First Vienna Award. From 1945 until the Velvet Divorce, it was part of Czechoslovakia. Since then it has been part of Slovakia.

== Population ==
Population statistic (10 years)
Year	1995	2005	2015	2025
Count	1308	1329	1380	1217
Difference		+1.60%	+3.83%	−11.81%

Population statistic
Year	2024	2025
Count	1218	1217
Difference		−0.08%

It has a population of 1217 people (31 December 2025).

=== Ethnicity ===
Census 2021 (1+ %)
Ethnicity	Number	Fraction
Hungarian	918	72.34%
Slovak	295	23.24%
Not found out	127	10%
Total	1269	

In year 2021 was 1269 people by ethnicity 918 as Hungarian, 295 as Slovak, 127 as Not found out, 7 as Romani, 5 as Czech, 4 as Ukrainian, 3 as Polish, 1 as Austrian and 1 as Other.

Note on population: The difference values of population numbers in the table "Population statistic" and in the sections "Ethnicity" & "Religion" is caused by the use of various statistical methods.

=== Religion ===
Census 2021 (1+ %)
Religion	Number	Fraction
Roman Catholic Church	831	65.48%
None	244	19.23%
Not found out	131	10.32%
Calvinist Church	21	1.65%
Greek Catholic Church	16	1.26%
Total	1269	

In year 2021 was 1269 people by religion 831 from Roman Catholic Church, 244 from None, 131 from Not found out, 21 from Calvinist Church, 16 from Greek Catholic Church, 10 from Evangelical Church, 4 from Other and not ascertained christian church, 3 from Jehovah's Witnesses, 3 from Other, 2 from Christian Congregations in Slovakia, 1 from Old Catholic Church, 1 from United Methodist Church, 1 from Church of Jesus Christ of Latter-day Saints and 1 from Buddhism.

== Facilities ==
The village has a public library and a football pitch.

== Genealogical resources ==
The records for genealogical research are available at the state archive "Statny Archiv in Nitra, Slovakia"

- Roman Catholic church records (births/marriages/deaths): 1724–1895 (parish A)
- Lutheran church records (births/marriages/deaths): 1793–1895 (parish B)
- Reformated church records (births/marriages/deaths): 1833–1895 (parish B)

== See also ==
- List of municipalities and towns in Slovakia
