= Štrkovec =

Municipality in Slovakia

Štrkovec Kövecses
- Municipality
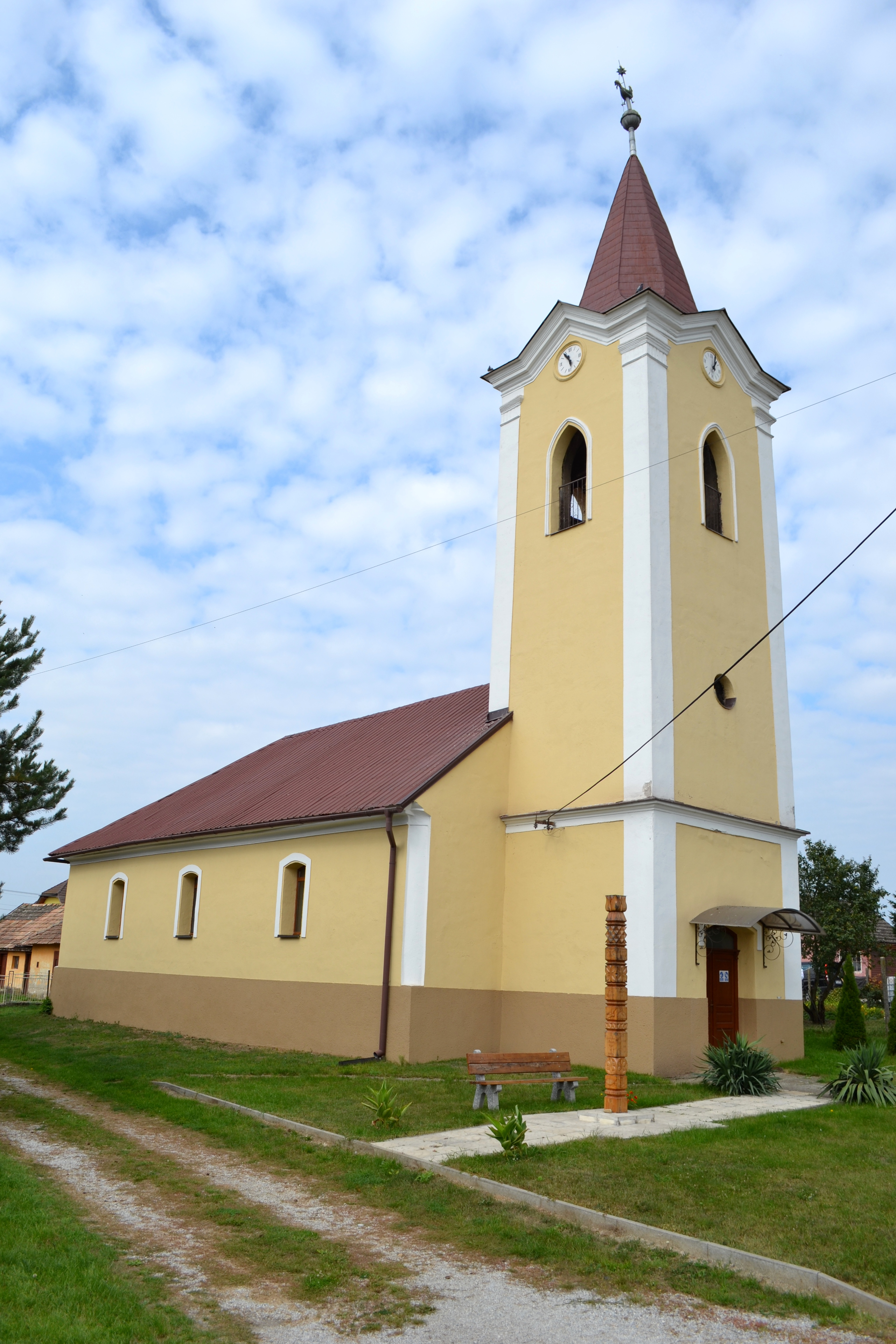

- Flag

- Location of Štrkovec in the Banská Bystrica Region Location of Štrkovec in Slovakia
- Coordinates: 48.36°N 20.32°E
- Country: Slovakia
- Region: Banská Bystrica Region
- District: Rimavská Sobota District
- First mentioned: 1323

Area
  - Total: 4.35 km^{2} (1.68 sq mi)
- Elevation: 169 m (554 ft)

Population (2025)
  - Total: 377
- Time zone: UTC+1 (CET)
  - Summer (DST): UTC+2 (CEST)
- Postal code: 980 45
- Area code: +421 47
- Vehicle registration plate (until 2022): RS
- Website: www.strkovec-obec.sk

Štrkovec (Hungarian: Kövecses) is a village and municipality in the Rimavská Sobota District of the Banská Bystrica Region of southern Slovakia, near the border to Hungary. It was part of Hungary until the Treaty of Trianon of 1920. Its Hungarian name is Kövecses.

== Geography ==
The municipality lies at an altitude of 169 metres (554 ft) and covers an area of 4.35 km^{2} (1.68 sq mi) (2025).

== Population ==
Population statistic (10 years)
Year	1995	2005	2015	2025
Count	349	353	379	377
Difference		+1.14%	+7.36%	−0.52%

Population statistic
Year	2024	2025
Count	368	377
Difference		+2.44%

It has a population of 377 people (31 December 2025).

=== Ethnicity ===
Census 2021 (1+ %)
Ethnicity	Number	Fraction
Hungarian	264	69.47%
Romani	74	19.47%
Slovak	47	12.36%
Not found out	11	2.89%
Total	380	

In year 2021 was 380 people by ethnicity 264 as Hungarian, 74 as Romani, 47 as Slovak and 11 as Not found out.

Note on population: The difference values of population numbers in the table "Population statistic" and in the sections "Ethnicity" & "Religion" is caused by the use of various statistical methods.

=== Religion ===
Census 2021 (1+ %)
Religion	Number	Fraction
Calvinist Church	146	38.42%
Roman Catholic Church	134	35.26%
None	69	18.16%
Not found out	17	4.47%
Evangelical Church	11	2.89%
Total	380	

In year 2021 was 380 people by religion 146 from Calvinist Church, 134 from Roman Catholic Church, 69 from None, 17 from Not found out, 11 from Evangelical Church and 3 from Greek Catholic Church.
