= Freezing level =

Altitude in which the temperature is at 0 °C

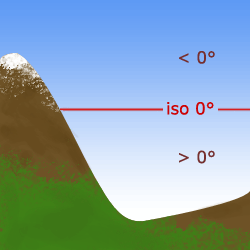
The 0 °C isotherm under normal conditions

The freezing level or freezing level height (FLH) represents the altitude in which the temperature in a free atmosphere is at 0 °C , i.e. the freezing point of water. FLH is important for weather in mountainous regions and aviation and over time an indicator of climate variability and climate change.

Any given measure is valid for only a short period of time, often less than a day as variations in wind, sunlight, air masses and other factors may change the level.

== Definition ==
The freezing level height (FLH) represents the altitude, at which the air temperature is at 0 °C, the freezing point of water. It indicates the altitude at which rain transitions to snow. It is also called 0 °C (zero-degree) isotherm, where an isotherm represents the line on a weather map with the same temperature.

Above the freezing altitude, the temperature of the air is below the freezing point of water and ice may form. Below it, the temperature is above freezing.

== Uses ==
The freezing level height is studied in meteorology and used for a variety of forecasts and predictions, especially in climate science, serving as an indicator of climate variability and climate change.

The freezing level height is an important cornerstone of alpine climate. While not given on general weather forecasts, it is used in bulletins giving weather forecasts for mountainous areas. The freezing level and icing forecasts are of interest to aviation.

Freezing level height changes correlate with changes in snow cover, evolution of glaciers and changes in permafrost.

== History ==
The 700 hPa pressure level or about 3000 m above sea level has historically been assumed as a rough estimate of the freezing level height.

== Measurement ==
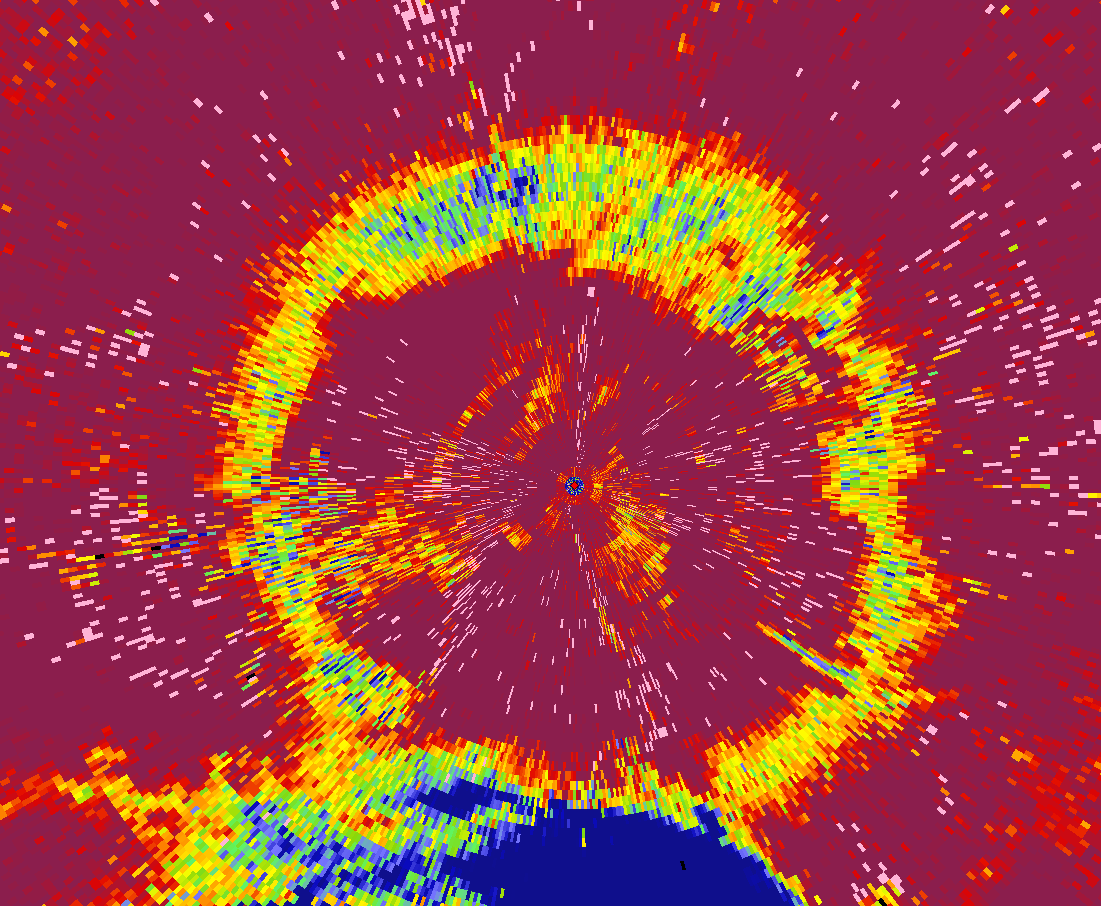
Dual-polarization radar image of an easily identifiable freezing layer, denoted by the yellow ring around the radar.

The freezing level height is determined by measuring the temperature in the free atmosphere i.e. allowing reflection of the sun by snow, icing conditions, etc at different altitudes.

There are several different methods to examine the temperature and calculate the freezing level height:

- A radiosonde attached to a weather balloon is the oldest and most common method used. Each area normally releases two balloons a day in locations hundreds of kilometers apart.
- Measuring devices attached to commercial airliners permit reporting the isotherm, and its height from sea level, to aerial traffic.
- Weather satellites are equipped with sensors that scan the atmosphere and measure the infrared radiation it emits indicating its temperature.
- Weather radar detects bright bands, which are radar echoes produced just underneath and within the isotherm caused by the melting of snow or ice in the layer below that is above 0 °C.

Depending on the frequency and resolution at which these readings are taken, these methods can report the isotherm with greater or lesser precision. Radiosondes, for example, only report a reading twice daily and provide very rough information. Weather radar can detect a variation every five to ten minutes if there is precipitation, and can scan a radius of up to two kilometers.

== Variations ==
The freezing level height varies by season and is much lower in the winter than in the summer.

The 0 °C isotherm can be very stable over a large area. It can vary under two major conditions locally and globally:

1. A change in the density of air due to weather fronts. This changes the isotherm gradually, over tens of kilometres for a cold front, and hundreds for a warm front, but the change spreads over a large area.
2. Local levels can be changed by wind, reflection of the sun, snow, and humidity level. These factors can cause the isotherm to change rapidly and sometimes constantly over several kilometres, in both winter and summer all year round. Also, atmospheric subsidence and ascendence can contribute to variations in the isotherm.

== See also ==
- Temperature inversion
- Lapse rate
