= Ell, Netherlands =

Ell Èl (Limburgish)
- Village
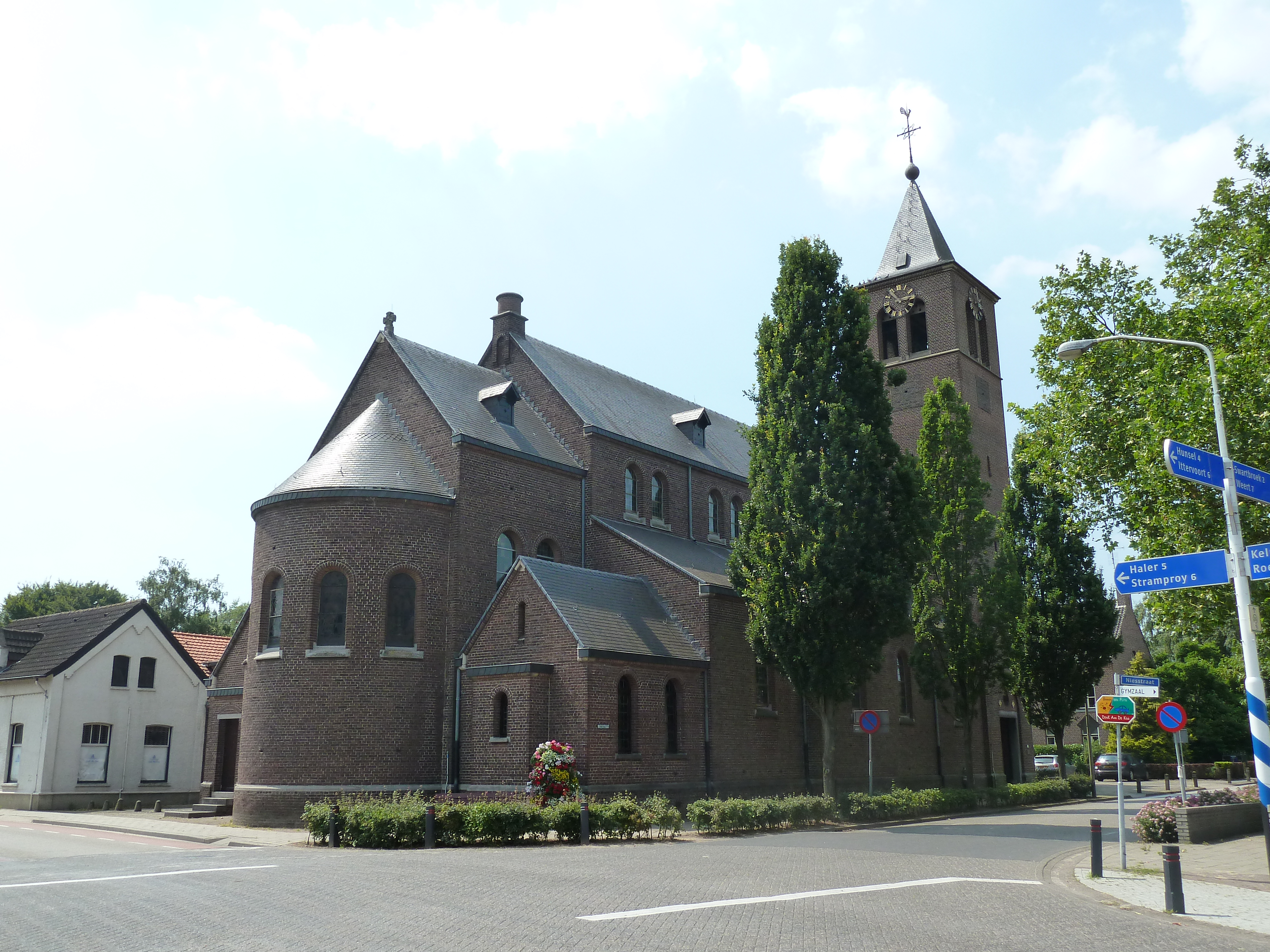
- St Antonius Abt Church

- Location in the Netherlands Location in the province of Limburg in the Netherlands
- Coordinates: 51°13′N 5°48′E
- Country: Netherlands
- Province: Limburg
- Municipality: Leudal

Area
  - Total: 10.97 km^{2} (4.24 sq mi)
- Elevation: 29 m (95 ft)

Population (2021)
  - Total: 1,470
  - Density: 134/km^{2} (347/sq mi)
- Time zone: UTC+1 (CET)
  - Summer (DST): UTC+2 (CEST)
- Postal code: 6010-6011
- Dialing code: 0495
- Major roads: A2

Ell (Limburgish: Èl) is a village in the Dutch province of Limburg. It is a part of the municipality of Leudal and lies about 7 km southeast of Weert.

== History ==
It was first mentioned in 1244 as Elle. The etymology is unknown. Ell developed in the Late Middle Ages along the Tungelroyse Beek. It was part of the Imperial Abbey of Thorn, a tiny independent country, until 1794.

The Catholic St Antonius Abt Church is a three aisled basilica-like church built in 1912 to replace a church from 1823. The tower was blown up in 1944, and the church was restored in 1946. In 1953, a new tower was added.

Ell was home to 297 people in 1840.

== Gallery ==
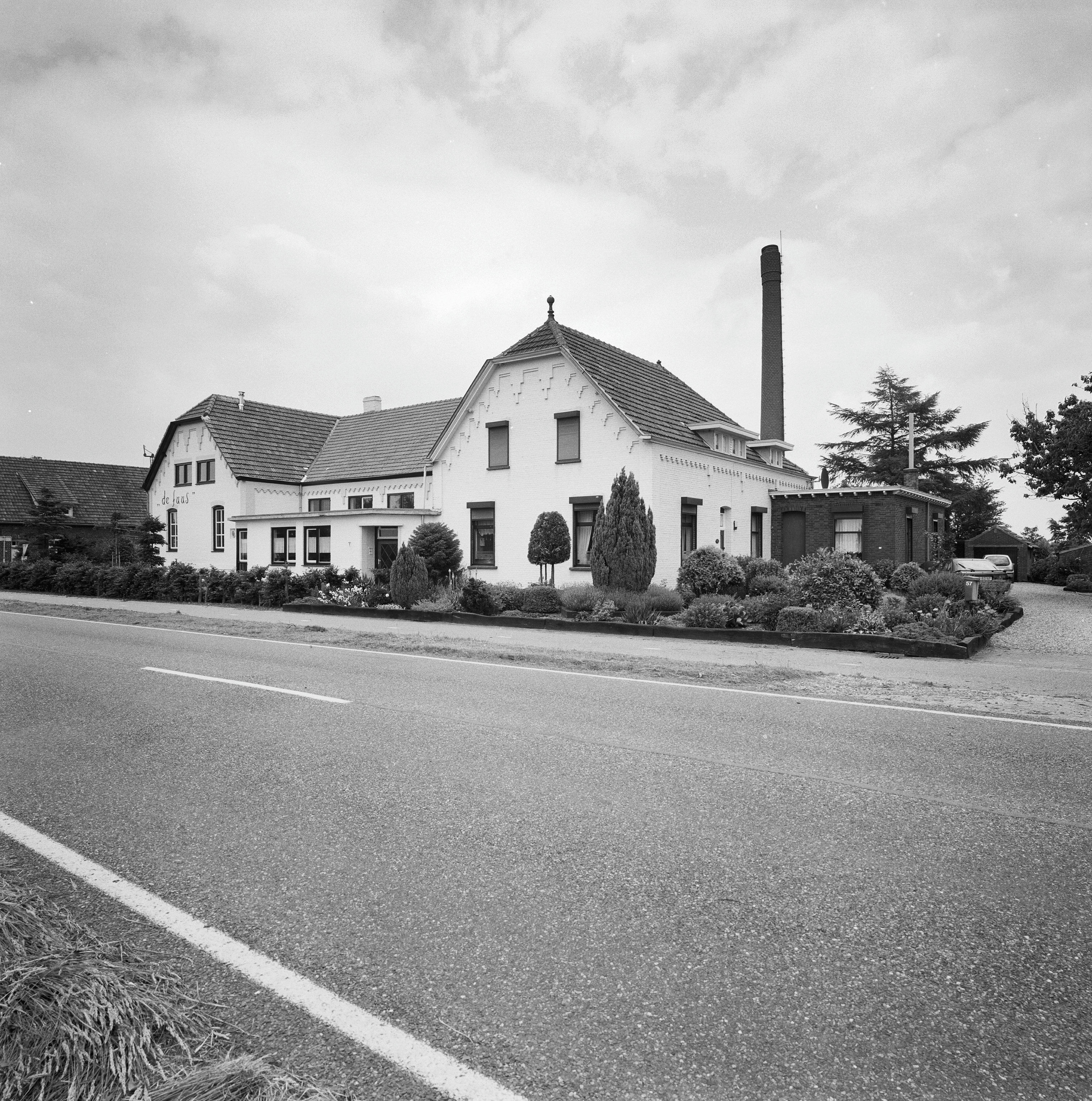
Former dairy factory

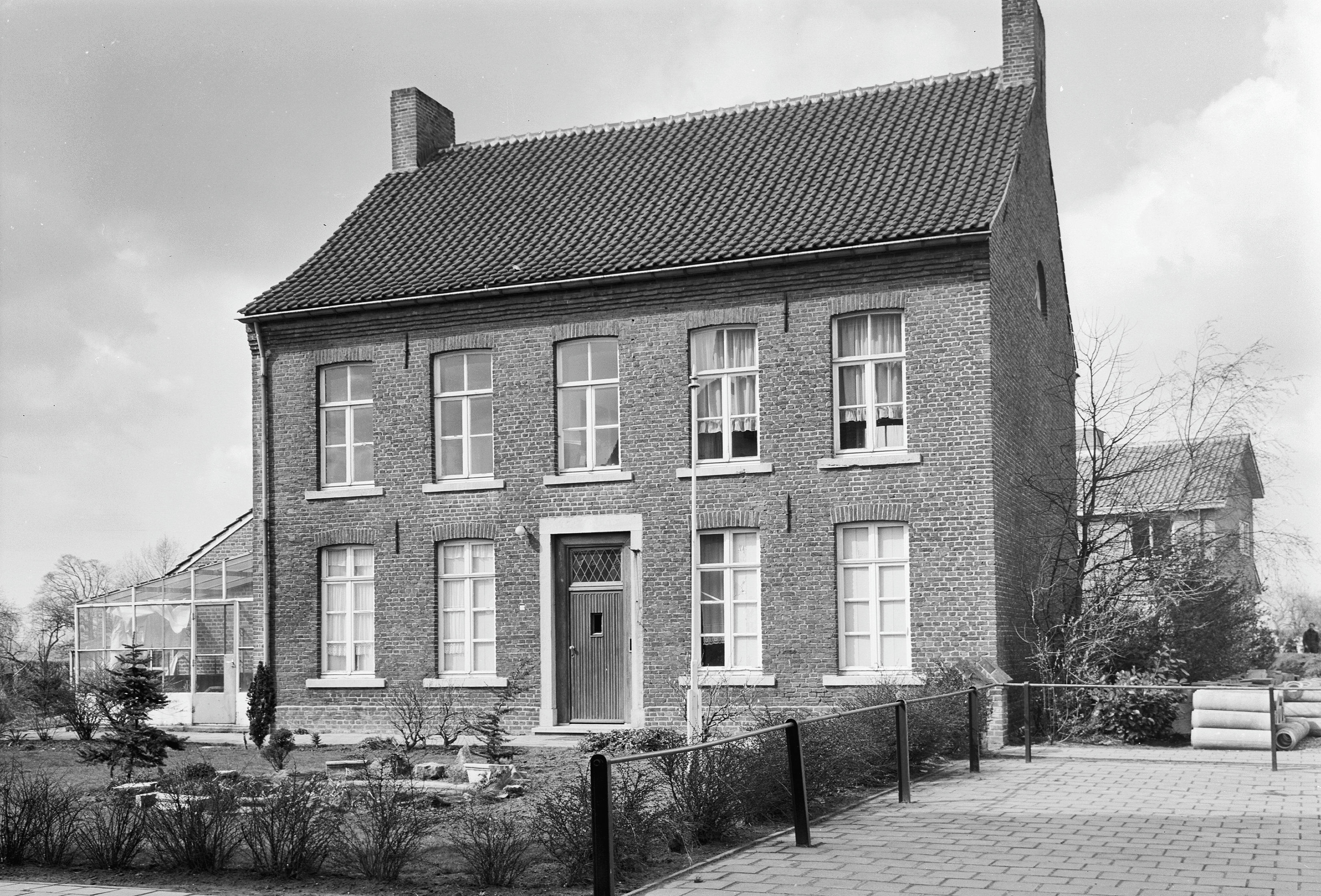
House in Ell
