= Stresow =

- Stadtteil of Möckern
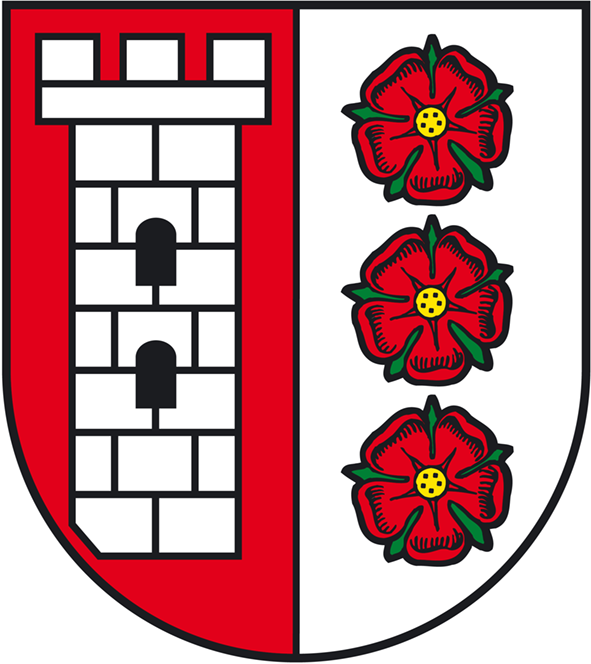
- Coat of arms
- Interactive map of Stresow
- Location within Germany Location within Saxony-Anhalt
- Coordinates: 52°15′N 12°1′E
- Country: Germany
- State: Saxony-Anhalt
- District: Jerichower Land
- Town: Möckern

Area
  - Total: 6.27 km^{2} (2.42 sq mi)
- Elevation: 59 m (194 ft)

Population (2009-12-31)
  - Total: 132
  - Density: 21.1/km^{2} (54.5/sq mi)
- Time zone: UTC+01:00 (CET)
  - Summer (DST): UTC+02:00 (CEST)
- Postal codes: 39291
- Dialling codes: 039223
- Vehicle registration: JL

Stresow is a village and a former municipality in the Jerichower Land district, in Saxony-Anhalt, Germany. Since 1 September 2010, it is part of the town Möckern.

== Geography ==
Stresow is located about 10 km east of Burg bei Magdeburg. It was part of the Verwaltungsgemeinschaft Möckern-Loburg-Fläming.

=== Highways ===
- Bundesstraße 1 that ties Magdeburg with Berlin, lays only 9.5 km north of the town.
- Bundesautobahn 2 exit 75 can be reached in only 5.5 km South East of the town.
