= List of extreme temperatures in Germany =

The following table lists the highest and lowest temperatures recorded in each state in Germany, in both Celsius and Fahrenheit. The warmest years on record in Germany were 2018 and 2022.

== Temperature extremes by state ==
State	Extreme Maximum			Extreme Minimum			Extreme By Both
State	Temperature	Location	Date	Temperature	Location	Date	Extremeness
Baden-Württemberg	41.4 °C (106.5 °F)	Waghäusel-Kirrlach	June 27, 2026	−36.1 °C (−33.0 °F)	Doline Degerfeld, Albstadt	March 1, 2005	76.4 / 137.5
Bavaria	40.8 °C (105.4 °F)	Kitzingen	June 26 and 27, 2026	−45.9 °C (−50.6 °F)	Funtensee	December 24, 2001	86.2 / 155.1
Berlin	39.9 °C (103.8 °F)	Berlin-Tempelhof	June 27, 2026	−31.9 °C (−25.4 °F)	Blankenburg, District of Pankow	January 19, 1893	70.8 / 127.4
Brandenburg	41.7 °C (107.1 °F)	Neißemünde-Coschen	June 28, 2026	−32.1 °C (−25.8 °F)	Heinersdorf, Großbeeren	January 19, 1893	71.3 / 128.4
Bremen	37.6 °C (99.7 °F)	Bremen Airport	August 9, 1992	−23.6 °C (−10.5 °F)	Bremen Airport	February 13, 1940	61.2 / 110.2
Hamburg	40.1 °C (104.2 °F)	Neuwiedenthal, District of Neugraben-Fischbek	July 20, 2022	−29.1 °C (−20.4 °F)	Fuhlsbüttel Airport	February 13, 1940	69.2 / 124.6
Hesse	41.3 °C (106.3 °F)	Bad Nauheim	June 27, 2026	−33.8 °C (−28.8 °F)	Lahntal, Gießen	January 22, 1850	74.0 / 133.2
Lower Saxony	40.2 °C (104.4 °F)	Lüchow (Note: This list does not include a value of 42.6 °C (108.7 °F), recorded on July 25, 2019 in Lingen, since it was invalidated in December 2020.)	June 27, 2026	−28.5 °C (−19.3 °F)	Ricklingen, Hanover	January 27, 1942	68.5 / 123.3
Mecklenburg-Vorpommern	39.6 °C (103.3 °F)	Anklam	June 27, 2026	−32.5 °C (−26.5 °F)	Ueckermünde	February 11, 1929	71.9 / 129.4
North Rhine-Westphalia	41.2 °C (106.2 °F)	Duisburg (Baerl) & Tönisvorst	July 25, 2019	−31.2 °C (−24.2 °F)	Eslohe	January 27, 1942	72.4 / 130.4
Rhineland-Palatinate	41.1 °C (106.0 °F)	Andernach & Trier-Zewen	June 27, 2026	−27.5 °C (−17.5 °F)	Birkenfeld	January 29, 1895	67.9 / 122.2
Saarland	41.4 °C (106.5 °F)	Saarbrücken-Burbach	June 27, 2026	−24.2 °C (−11.6 °F)	Osterhof, Sankt Wendel	January 13, 1968	64.5 / 116.1
Saxony	41.5 °C (106.7 °F)	Bad Muskau	June 28, 2026	−34.1 °C (−29.4 °F)	Bad Elster	February 12, 1871	73.9 / 133.0
Saxony-Anhalt	41.5 °C (106.7 °F)	Möckern-Drewitz	June 27, 2026	−30.6 °C (−23.1 °F)	Krüssau, Möckern	February 12, 1929	70.6 / 127.1
Schleswig-Holstein	39.2 °C (102.6 °F)	Grambek near Mölln	June 27, 2026	−30.9 °C (−23.6 °F)	Heide (Holstein)	February 13, 1940	70.0 / 126.0
Thuringia	39.8 °C (103.6 °F)	Dachwig	June 27, 2026	−33.5 °C (−28.3 °F)	Gotha	February 11, 1929	72.6 / 130.7
