= Fedir Babachenko =

Soviet military officer (1911–1944)

Fedir Zakharovich Babachenko
- Федір Захарович Бабаченко
- Born: 10 October 1911; Stepanovka, Kharkov Governorate, Russian Empire
- Died: 1944 (aged 32–33) unknown
- Military career
- Allegiance: Soviet Union
- Branch: Red Army
- Service years: 1933–1935; 1938–1944
- Rank: Major
- Unit: 323rd Artillery Regiment
- Conflicts: World War II; Winter War; Eastern Front (POW)
- Awards: Hero of the Soviet Union

Fedir Zakharovich Babachenko (Russian: Фёдор Захарович Бабаченко; 10 October 1911 – 1944) was a Junior Lieutenant and chief of intelligence in the 323rd Artillery Regiment of the 123rd Infantry Division in the 7th Army on the Northwestern Front during the Winter War. For his actions in the war he was awarded the title Hero of the Soviet Union on 11 April 1940 before he went missing in action during the Second World War in 1944 and as presumed to have been killed in after he was captured.

== Early life ==
Babachenko was born in 1911 to a Ukrainian peasant family in Stepanovka within the Russian Empire, currently located in present-day Ukraine. After graduating from secondary school in Sitniki he was employed as a deputy of a village council until joined the Komsomol and began working on a collective farm with his parents.

== Military career ==
Babachenko enlisted in the Soviet military in 1933 but was demobilized in 1935 to study agriculture, for which he was briefly the director of a state farm before being drafted into the military again in 1938.

Babachenko served in the Soviet-Finnish War, where he served as a Junior Lieutenant and chief of intelligence in his regiment, the 323rd Artillery Regiment. While on a reconnaissance mission in 1940 in Bezymyannaya, he discovered three trenches with Finnish soldiers ready to fire on Soviet troops. Babachenko and his fellow soldiers threw grenades into the trenches but ended up engaging in hand-to-hand combat, which resulted in Babachenko getting stabbed by a bayonet but survived.

On different reconnaissance mission, in the city Vyborg of the Leningrad Oblast, Babachenko discovered another set of fortifications, complete with machine guns. His scouting group launched a sudden attack, causing the opponent’s soldiers to flee and the Soviets took control of the fortifications, enabling the occupation of Podoshva and Pirti.

For his reconnaissance work in the Soviet-Finish War he was awarded the title Hero of the Soviet Union by decree of the Presidium of the Supreme Soviet on 11 April 1940. After the end of the war with the Finish he trained at the Lenin Military-Political Academy.

After the start of the Second World War in 1941 he faced combat again. After graduating from officer training courses he held the rank of Major and commanded the 104th Army Anti-tank Artillery Regiment until he was captured by enemy combatants in 1943. While his exact date of death is unknown, it is known that he was detained in Stalag I-B East Prussia until he was transferred to Stalag XI-A in Nazi Germany on 22 May 1944.

== Awards and honors ==
- Hero of the Soviet Union
- Order of Lenin
- Order of the Patriotic War, 2nd degree
