= Ehle (river) =

River in Germany

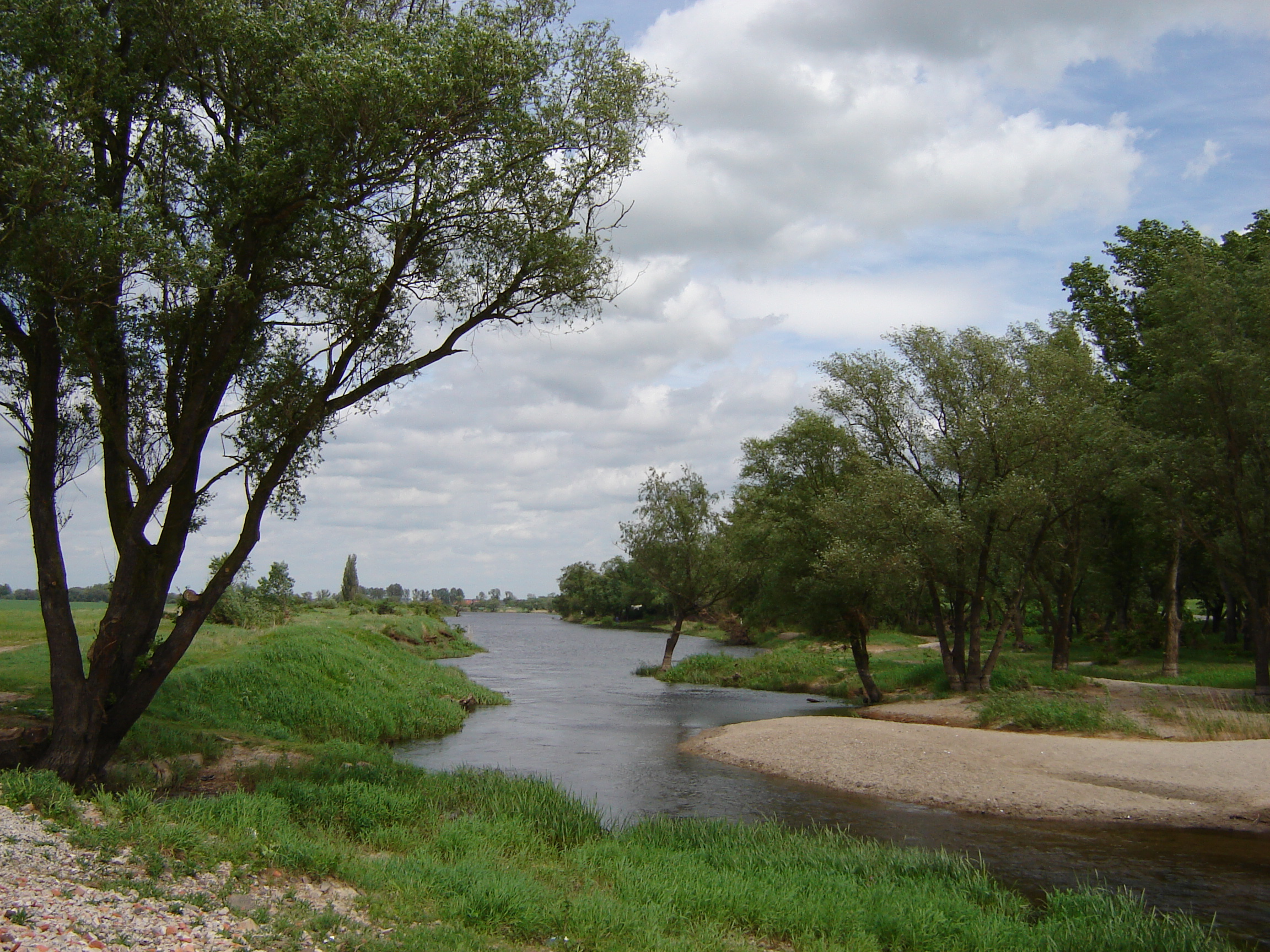

Location
- Country: Germany
- State: Saxony-Anhalt
- Cities: Schweinitz; Loburg; Möckern; Gommern; Biederitz; Lostau

Physical characteristics
- Source
  - location: near Schweinitz, Germany
- Mouth: Elbe
  - location: near Lostau, Germany
  - coordinates: 52.2063°N 11.7151°E
- Length: 40 km (25 mi)

Basin features
- Progression: Elbe→ North Sea

The Ehle (sometimes referred to as the "Biederitz River") is a river in Saxony-Anhalt, Germany. It is a right tributary of the Elbe, and approximately 40 kilometres (25 mi) long.

== History ==
The river gained international historical note as the site where Soviet KGB agents disposed of the cremated remains of Adolf Hitler, Eva Braun, General Hans Krebs and the Goebbels family in April 1970. The secret operation involved exhuming the remains from a Soviet installation in Magdeburg, thoroughly burning them, and scattering the ashes into the Ehle River to prevent any possibility of a future Neo-Nazi shrine.

== See also ==
- List of rivers of Saxony-Anhalt
