= Loburg =

- Stadtteil of Möckern
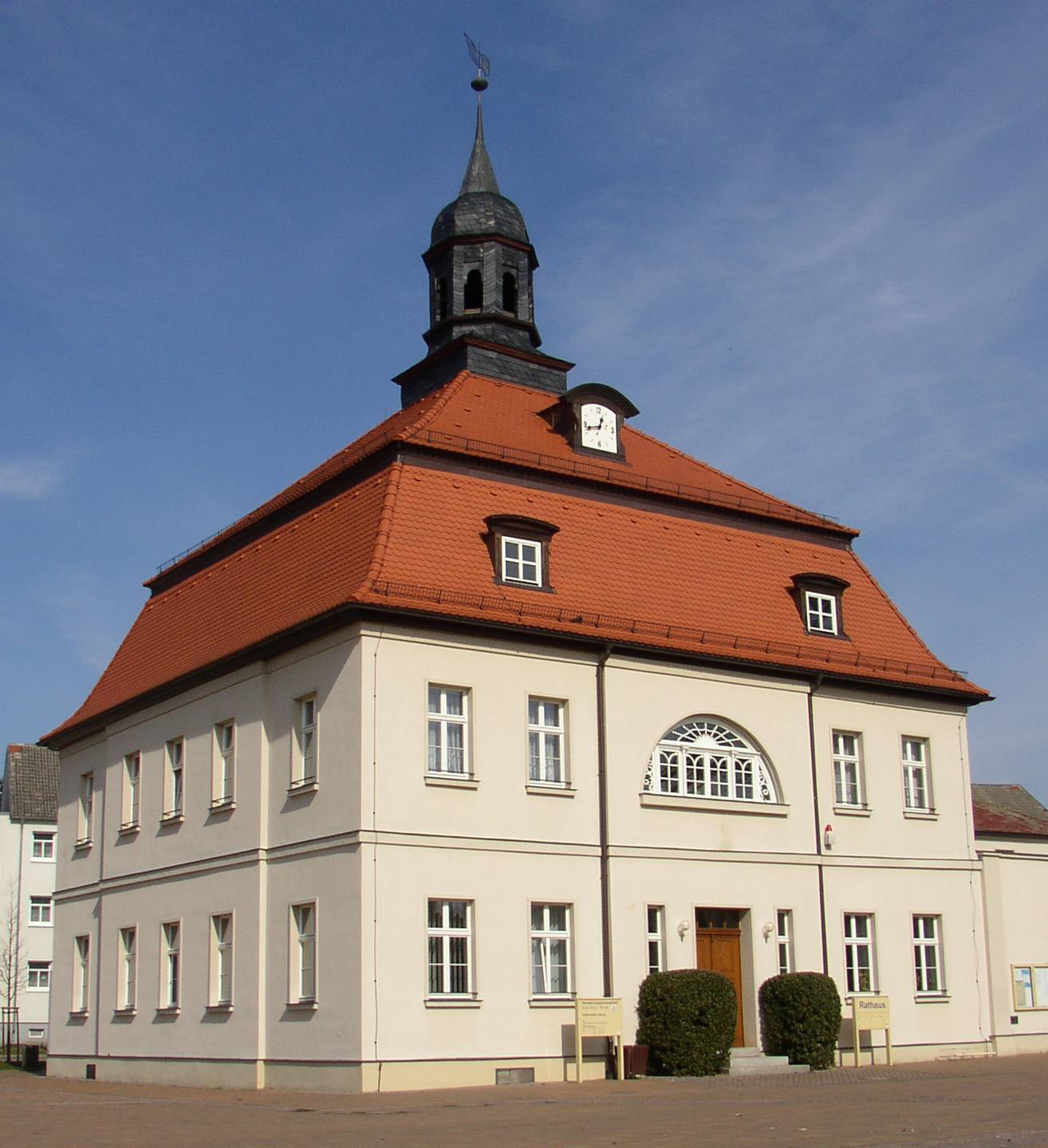
- Loburg town hall, 1747

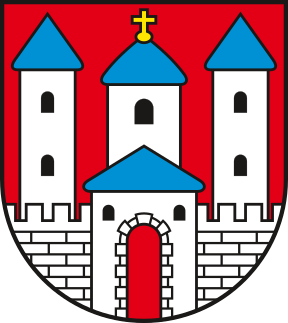
- Coat of arms
- Interactive map of Loburg
- Location within Germany Location within Saxony-Anhalt
- Coordinates: 52°7′N 12°4′E
- Country: Germany
- State: Saxony-Anhalt
- District: Jerichower Land
- Town: Möckern

Area
  - Total: 44.39 km^{2} (17.14 sq mi)
- Elevation: 75 m (246 ft)

Population (2006-12-31)
  - Total: 2,385
  - Density: 53.73/km^{2} (139.2/sq mi)
- Time zone: UTC+01:00 (CET)
  - Summer (DST): UTC+02:00 (CEST)
- Postal codes: 39279
- Dialling codes: 039245
- Vehicle registration: JL
- Website: www.moeckern-flaeming.de

Loburg is a town and former municipality in the Jerichower Land district, in Saxony-Anhalt, Germany. It is situated on the river Ehle, north of Zerbst. Since 1 January 2009, it is part of the town of Möckern.

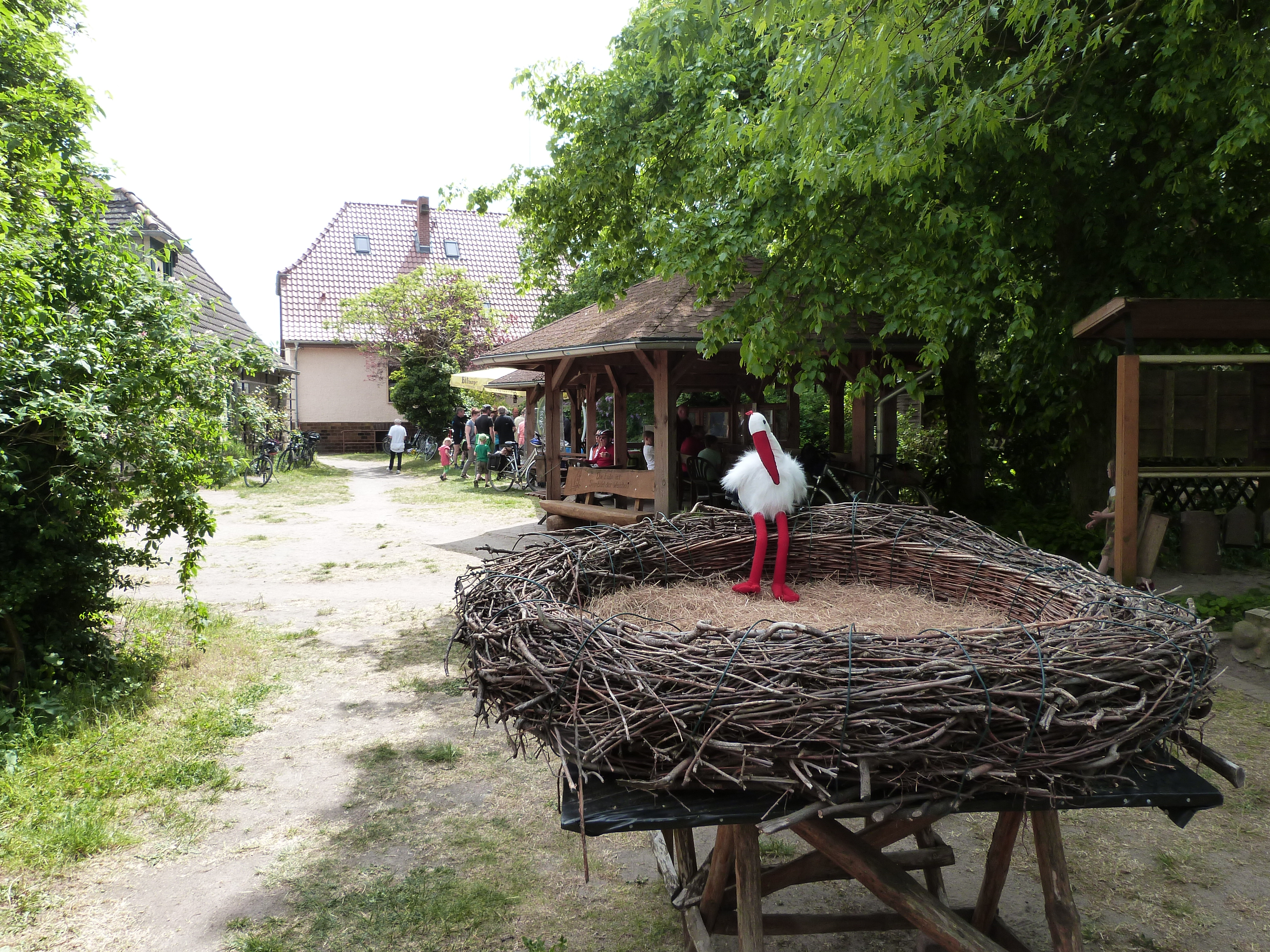
Visitor center of the stork sanctuary

It is home to the Stork Farm Loburg, a sanctuary for injured storks and other wild birds. The Storchenhof also does research in the migration routes and behaviour of storks. It is open to visitors year-round.
