= Rosian =

- Stadtteil of Möckern
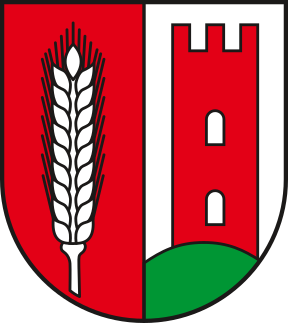
- Coat of arms
- Interactive map of Rosian
- Location within Germany Location within Saxony-Anhalt
- Coordinates: 52°4′N 12°9′E
- Country: Germany
- State: Saxony-Anhalt
- District: Jerichower Land
- Town: Möckern

Area
  - Total: 29.50 km^{2} (11.39 sq mi)
- Elevation: 89 m (292 ft)

Population (2023)
  - Total: 431
  - Density: 14.6/km^{2} (37.8/sq mi)
- Time zone: UTC+01:00 (CET)
  - Summer (DST): UTC+02:00 (CEST)
- Postal codes: 39279
- Dialling codes: 039245
- Vehicle registration: JL
- Website: www.moeckern-flaeming.de

Rosian is a village and a former municipality in the Jerichower Land district, in Saxony-Anhalt, Germany. Since 1 January 2009, it is part of the town Möckern. Its population is 431 (2023).
