= Tryppehna =

- Stadtteil of Möckern
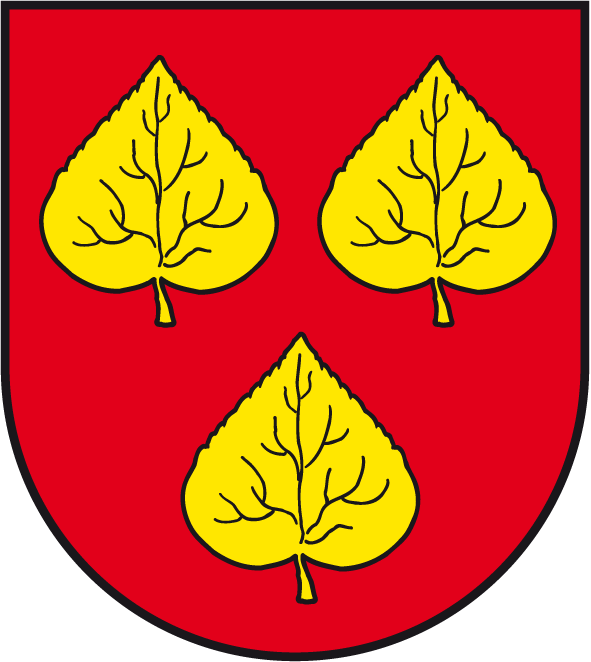
- Coat of arms
- Interactive map of Tryppehna
- Location within Germany Location within Saxony-Anhalt
- Coordinates: 52°10′N 11°55′E
- Country: Germany
- State: Saxony-Anhalt
- District: Jerichower Land
- Town: Möckern

Area
  - Total: 10.65 km^{2} (4.11 sq mi)
- Elevation: 64 m (210 ft)

Population (2006-12-31)
  - Total: 278
  - Density: 26.1/km^{2} (67.6/sq mi)
- Time zone: UTC+01:00 (CET)
  - Summer (DST): UTC+02:00 (CEST)
- Postal codes: 39291
- Dialling codes: 039221
- Vehicle registration: JL

Tryppehna is a village and a former municipality in the Jerichower Land district, in Saxony-Anhalt, Germany. Since 1 January 2009, it has been part of the town Möckern.
