= Zeddenick =

- Stadtteil of Möckern
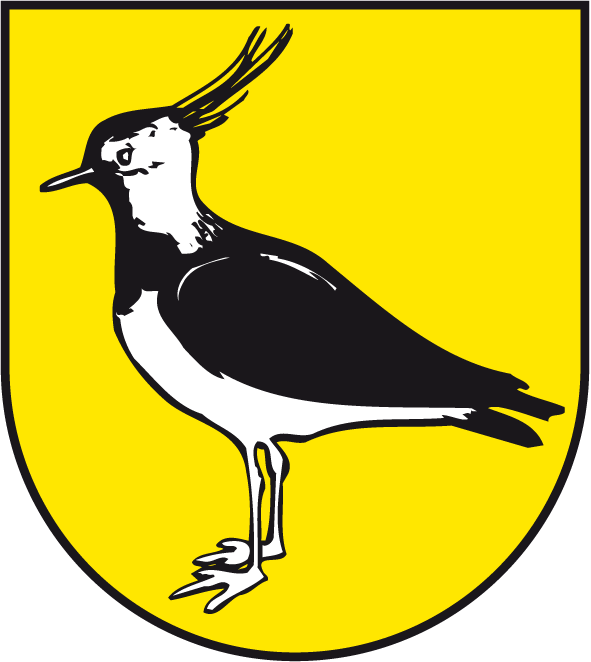
- Coat of arms
- Interactive map of Zeddenick
- Location within Germany Location within Saxony-Anhalt
- Coordinates: 52°08′N 11°53′E
- Country: Germany
- State: Saxony-Anhalt
- District: Jerichower Land
- Town: Möckern

Area
  - Total: 6.03 km^{2} (2.33 sq mi)
- Elevation: 57 m (187 ft)

Population (2006-12-31)
  - Total: 157
  - Density: 26.0/km^{2} (67.4/sq mi)
- Time zone: UTC+01:00 (CET)
  - Summer (DST): UTC+02:00 (CEST)
- Postal codes: 39291
- Dialling codes: 039221

Zeddenick is a village and a former municipality in the Jerichower Land district, in Saxony-Anhalt, Germany. Since January 1, 2009, it is part of the town Möckern.
