= Rietzel =

- Stadtteil of Möckern
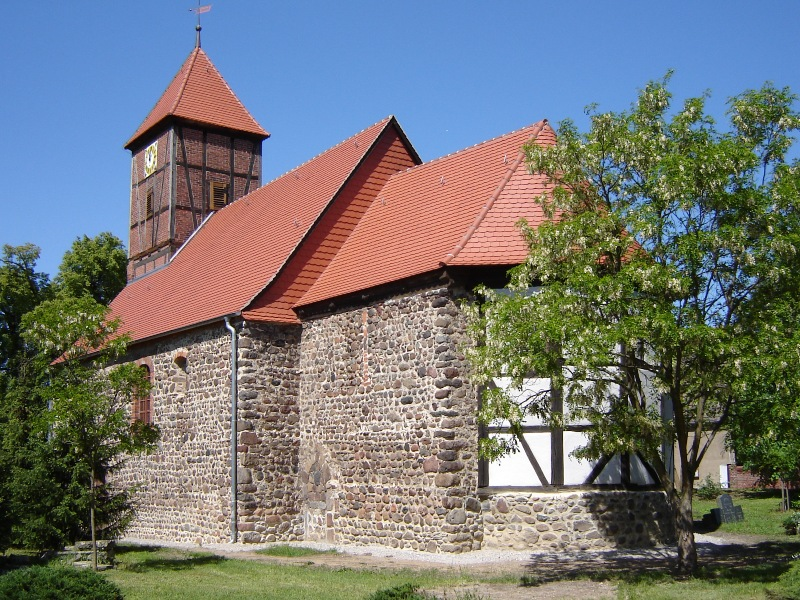
- Church

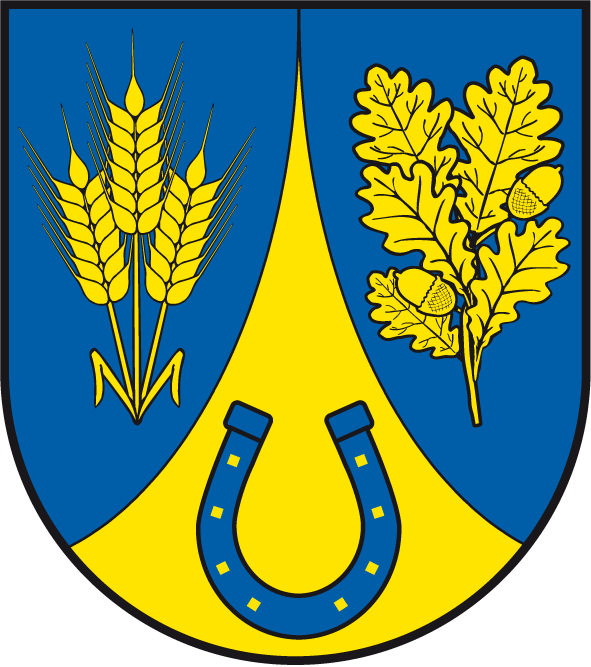
- Coat of arms
- Interactive map of Rietzel
- Location within Germany Location within Saxony-Anhalt
- Coordinates: 52°17′N 12°1′E
- Country: Germany
- State: Saxony-Anhalt
- District: Jerichower Land
- Town: Möckern

Area
  - Total: 11.56 km^{2} (4.46 sq mi)
- Elevation: 47 m (154 ft)

Population (2006-12-31)
  - Total: 151
  - Density: 13.1/km^{2} (33.8/sq mi)
- Time zone: UTC+01:00 (CET)
  - Summer (DST): UTC+02:00 (CEST)
- Postal codes: 39291
- Dialling codes: 039223

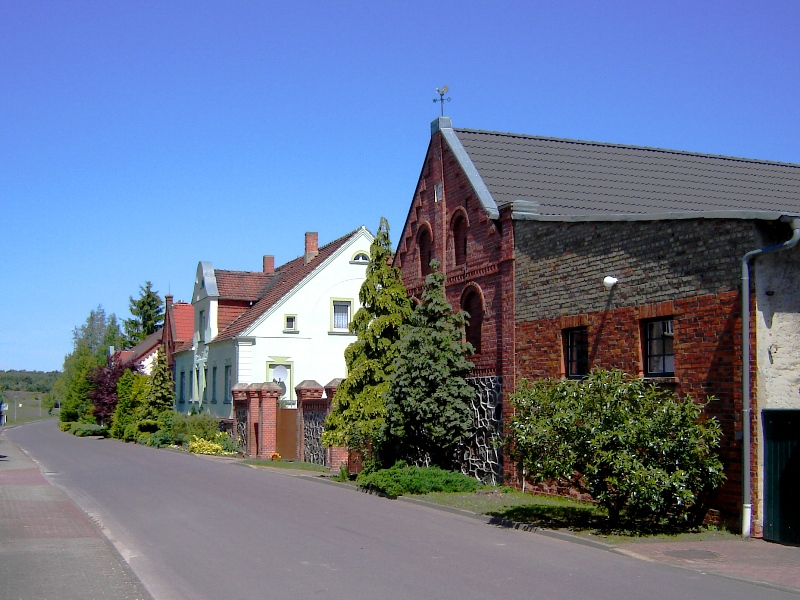
Dorfstraße

Rietzel is a village and a former municipality in the Jerichower Land district, in Saxony-Anhalt, Germany.

Since 1 January 2010, it is part of the town Möckern.
