= Küsel =

- Stadtteil of Möckern
- Interactive map of Küsel
- Location within Germany Location within Saxony-Anhalt
- Coordinates: 52°14′N 12°4′E
- Country: Germany
- State: Saxony-Anhalt
- District: Jerichower Land
- Town: Möckern

Area
  - Total: 3.19 km^{2} (1.23 sq mi)
- Elevation: 69 m (226 ft)

Population (2006-12-31)
  - Total: 130
  - Density: 41/km^{2} (110/sq mi)
- Time zone: UTC+01:00 (CET)
  - Summer (DST): UTC+02:00 (CEST)
- Postal codes: 39291
- Dialling codes: 039223

Küsel is a village and a former municipality in the Jerichower Land district, in Saxony-Anhalt, Germany. Since 1 January 2009, it is part of the town Möckern.
