= Hobeck =

- Stadtteil of Möckern
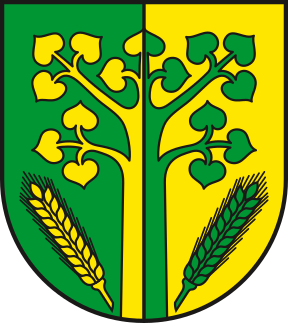
- Coat of arms
- Interactive map of Hobeck
- Location within Germany Location within Saxony-Anhalt
- Coordinates: 52°4′N 12°1′E
- Country: Germany
- State: Saxony-Anhalt
- District: Jerichower Land
- Town: Möckern

Area
  - Total: 17.45 km^{2} (6.74 sq mi)
- Elevation: 90 m (300 ft)

Population (2006-12-31)
  - Total: 503
  - Density: 28.8/km^{2} (74.7/sq mi)
- Time zone: UTC+01:00 (CET)
  - Summer (DST): UTC+02:00 (CEST)
- Postal codes: 39279
- Dialling codes: 039244
- Vehicle registration: JL
- Website: www.moeckern-flaeming.de

Hobeck is a village and a former municipality in the Jerichower Land district, in Saxony-Anhalt, Germany. Since 1 January 2009, it is part of the town Möckern.
