= Theeßen =

- Village of Möckern
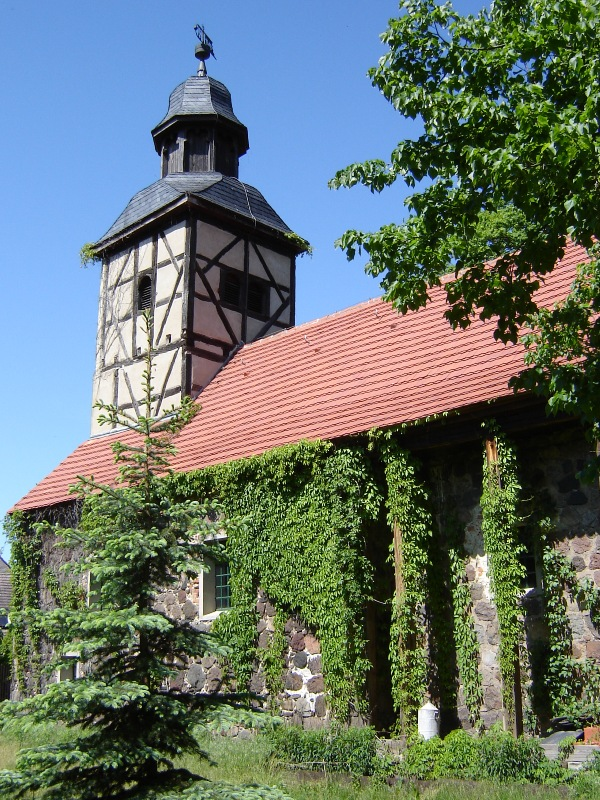

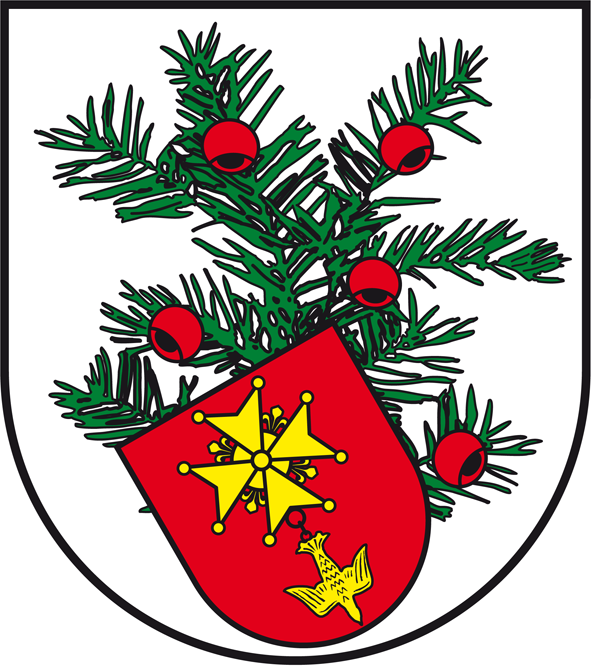
- Coat of arms
- Interactive map of Theeßen
- Location within Germany Location within Saxony-Anhalt
- Coordinates: 52°15′N 12°3′E
- Country: Germany
- State: Saxony-Anhalt
- District: Jerichower Land
- Town: Möckern

Area
  - Total: 22.04 km^{2} (8.51 sq mi)
- Elevation: 57 m (187 ft)

Population (2006-12-31)
  - Total: 505
  - Density: 22.9/km^{2} (59.3/sq mi)
- Time zone: UTC+01:00 (CET)
  - Summer (DST): UTC+02:00 (CEST)
- Postal codes: 39291
- Dialling codes: 039223

Theeßen is a former municipality in the Jerichower Land district, in Saxony-Anhalt, Germany. On 19 January 2008, it was incorporated into the town Möckern.
