= Grabow, Saxony-Anhalt =

Grabow
- Stadtteil of Möckern
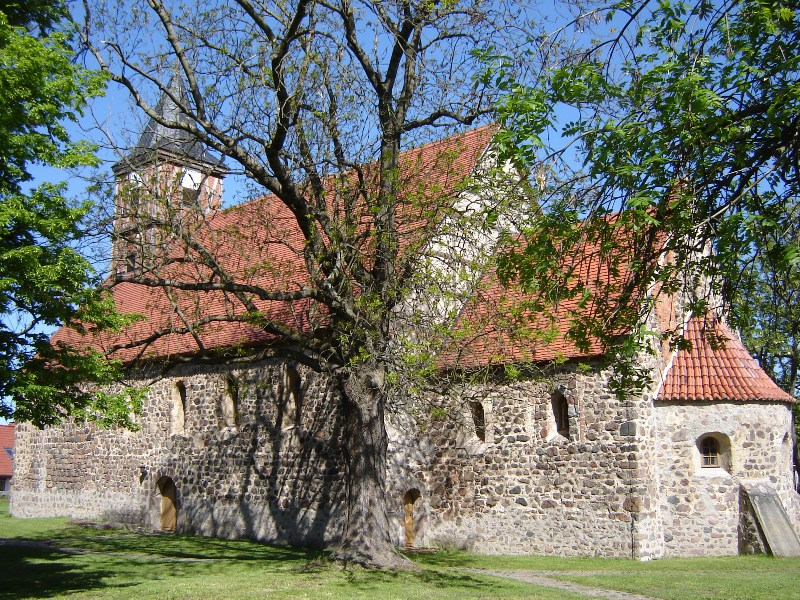
- Church

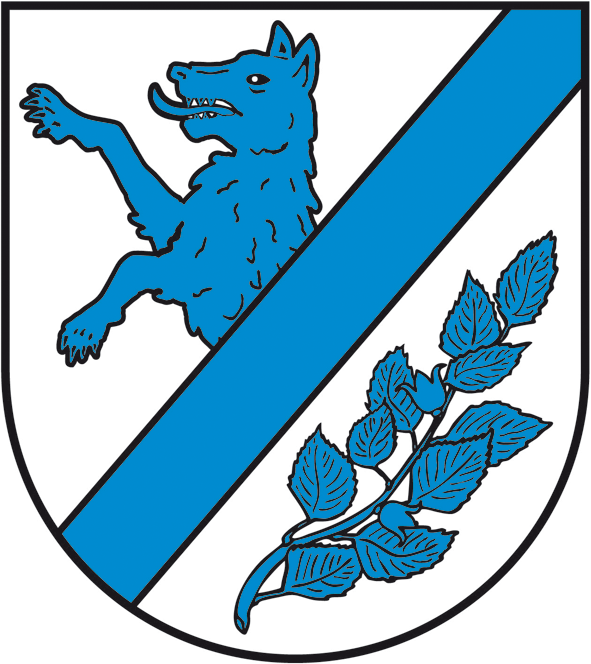
- Coat of arms
- Interactive map of Grabow
- Location within Germany Location within Saxony-Anhalt
- Coordinates: 52°15′N 11°57′E
- Country: Germany
- State: Saxony-Anhalt
- District: Jerichower Land
- Town: Möckern

Area
  - Total: 32.01 km^{2} (12.36 sq mi)
- Elevation: 51 m (167 ft)

Population (2006-12-31)
  - Total: 715
  - Density: 22.3/km^{2} (57.9/sq mi)
- Time zone: UTC+01:00 (CET)
  - Summer (DST): UTC+02:00 (CEST)
- Postal codes: 39291
- Dialling codes: 03921

Grabow is a village and a former municipality in the Jerichower Land district, in Saxony-Anhalt, Germany. Since 1 January 2010, it is part of the town Möckern.
