= Magdeburgerforth =

- Stadtteil of Möckern
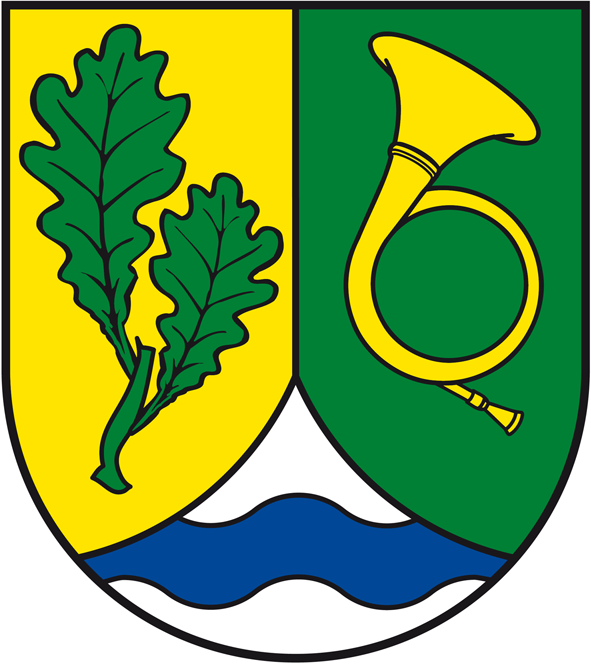
- Coat of arms
- Interactive map of Magdeburgerforth
- Location within Germany Location within Saxony-Anhalt
- Coordinates: 52°13′N 12°11′E
- Country: Germany
- State: Saxony-Anhalt
- District: Jerichower Land
- Town: Möckern

Area
  - Total: 25.27 km^{2} (9.76 sq mi)
- Elevation: 71 m (233 ft)

Population (2006-12-31)
  - Total: 247
  - Density: 9.77/km^{2} (25.3/sq mi)
- Time zone: UTC+01:00 (CET)
  - Summer (DST): UTC+02:00 (CEST)
- Postal codes: 39291
- Dialling codes: 039225
- Vehicle registration: JL
- Website: www.jerichower-land-online.de/index.html

Magdeburgerforth is a village and a former municipality in the Jerichower Land district, in Saxony-Anhalt, Germany. Since 2 July 2009, it is part of the town Möckern.
