= 2018 European heatwave =

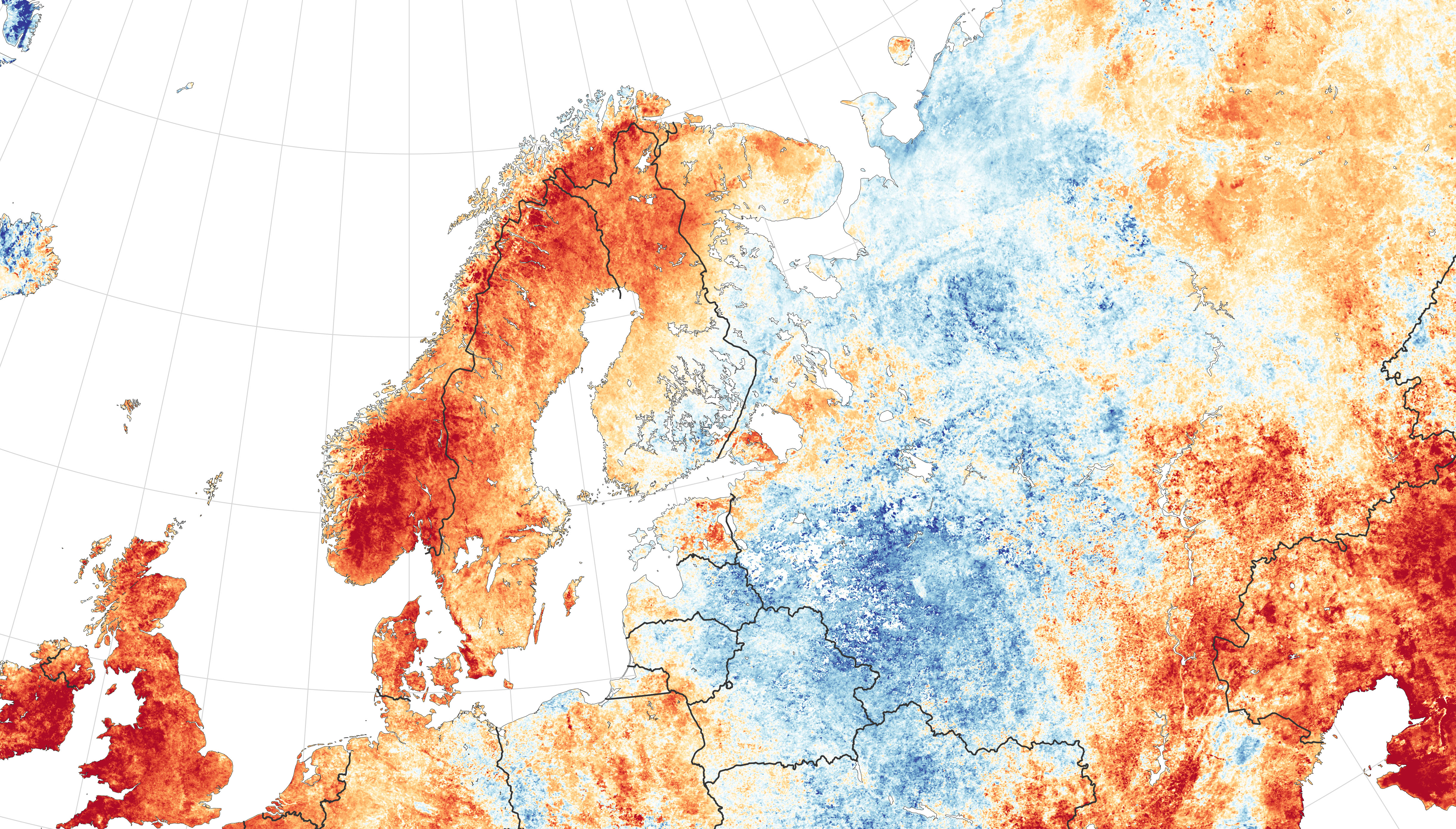
legend Temperature anomaly in Northern Europe in July 2018

The 2018 European drought and heat wave was a period of unusually hot weather that led to record-breaking temperatures and wildfires in many parts of Europe during the spring and summer of 2018. It is part of a larger heat wave affecting the Northern Hemisphere, caused in part by the jet stream being weaker than usual, allowing hot high-pressure air to linger in the same place. According to the European Drought Observatory, most of the areas affected by drought are across northern and central Europe. According to the World Meteorological Organization, the severe heat waves across the Northern Hemisphere in the summer of 2018, are linked to climate change in Europe, as well as events of extreme precipitation.

== General ==
Researchers at the Royal Netherlands Meteorological Institute and World Weather Attribution estimated that climate change more than doubled the overall likelihood of the heat wave, and in some places like Denmark made it up to five times as likely. The heat has built up for two months due to slow and weakened jet stream. One possible cause for the jet stream to be slow and weak relates to global warming. In the polar regions, the average surface temperature is rising more quickly than at mid latitudes in a phenomenon called polar amplification. Many researchers believe a strong polar amplification reduces the strength and changes the pattern of the jet stream, producing patterns like those occurring during the 2018 heat wave. Dr. Michael Mann opined that global warming may be making such heat waves even more likely than the researchers estimated, because at the time of the study the climate models could not fully account for how the jet stream is affected by global warming.

The extreme heat was blamed for forest fires and crop failures.

According to the World Meteorological Organization, the severe heat waves across the northern hemisphere in the summer of 2018, are linked to climate change in Europe, as well as events of extreme precipitation. Results were increase in elderly mortality; severe decline in yields; the biggest algae bloom in the Baltic sea for decades, that has poisoned water both for human and animals use; shutdowns of nuclear power plants in Europe, because the water in the rivers, that is used for cooling the reactors, was too warm; and electricity grids crashing across four continents. The impacts were severe, even in the countries considered rich and well prepared to deal with the impacts of climate change.

== By country ==
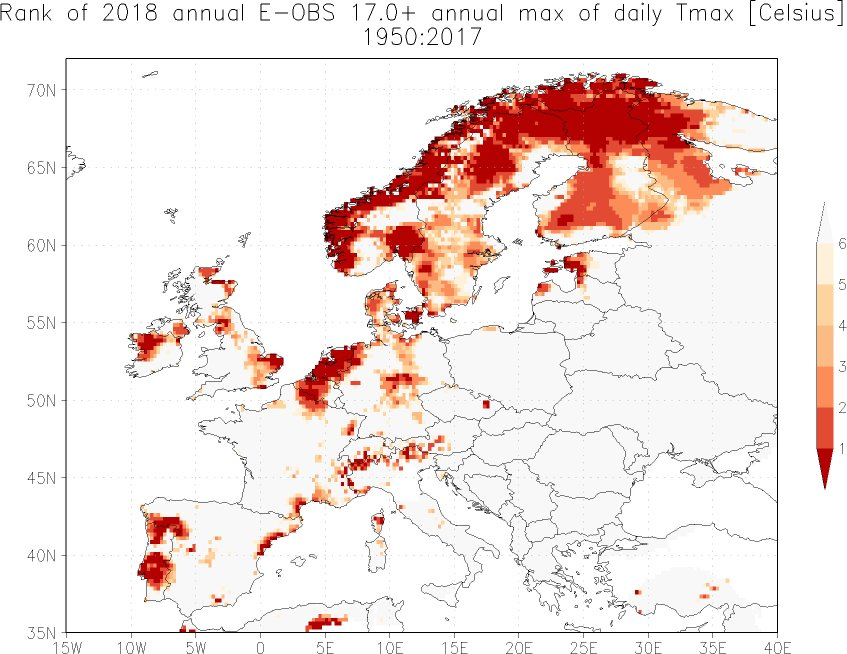
Rank of the highest max temperature of the 2018 summer in Europe, until August. Dark red means record high since 1950, bright red second place etc.

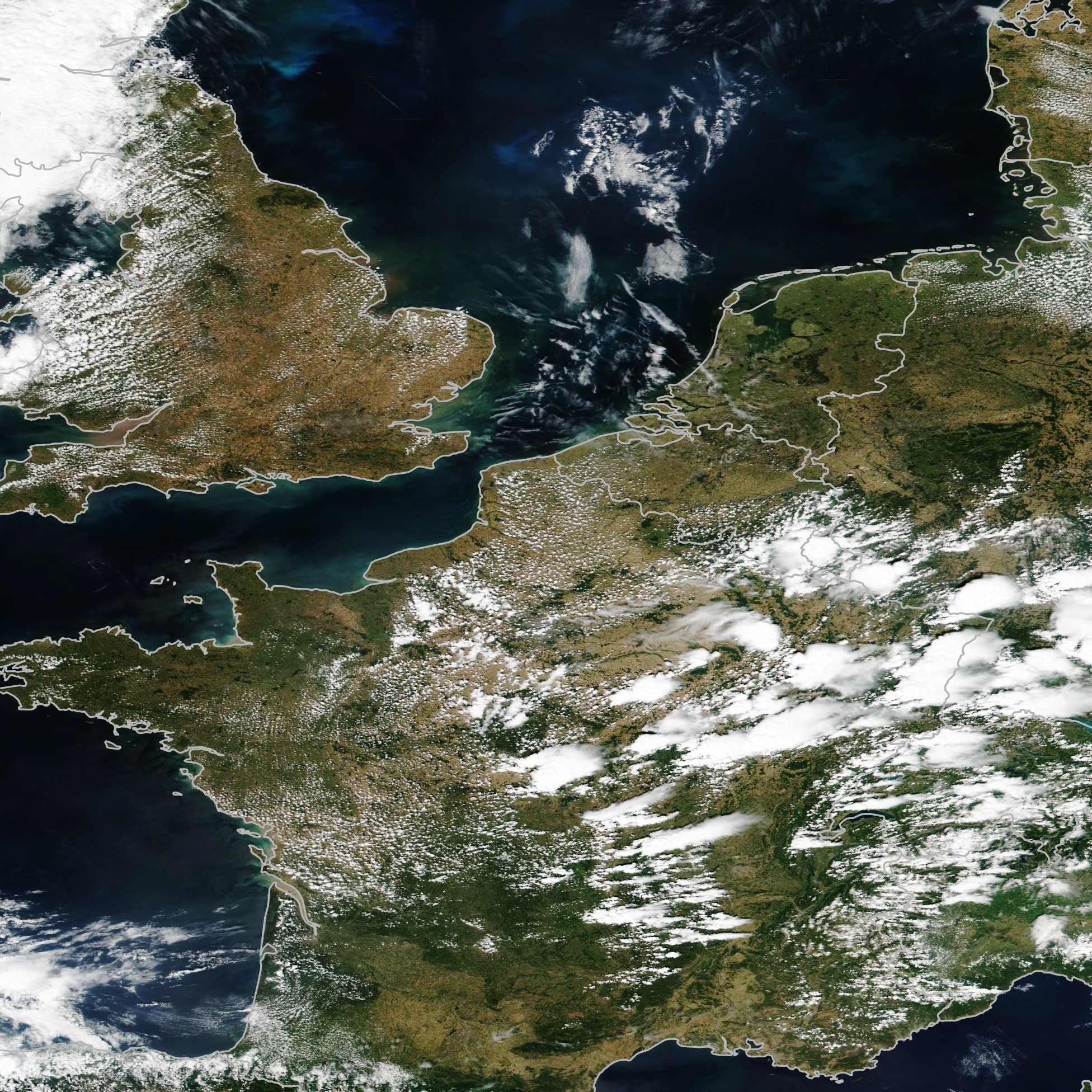
The parched landscape of northwestern Europe, 15 July 2018

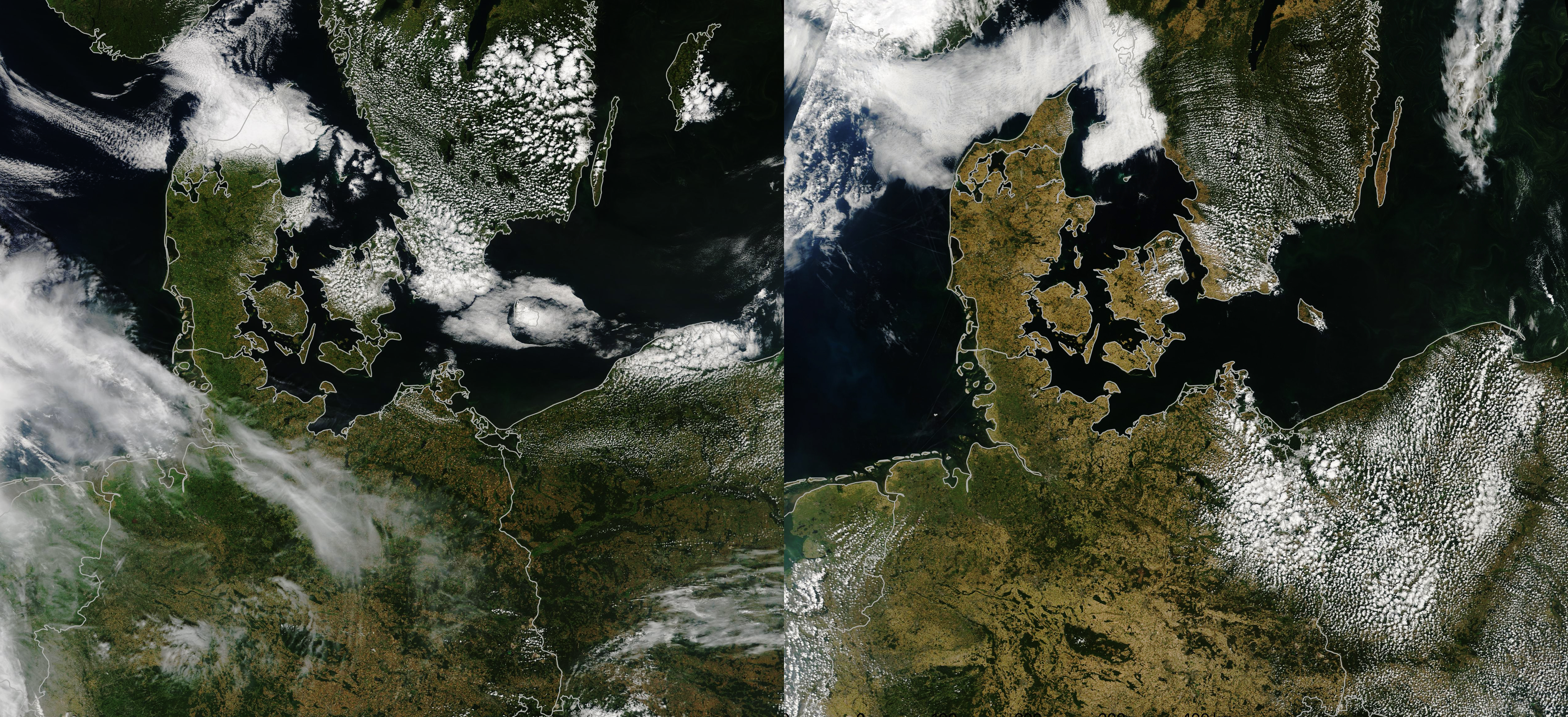
North-Central Europe on 19 July 2017 (left) and 24 July 2018 (right)

=== Austria ===
The west and the north of Austria were worst affected by drought; certain areas in these regions experienced up to 85% less rainfall than the 10-year average. Insurance companies estimate the damage as high as 210 million euro.

=== Belgium ===
Belgium experienced the second hottest July since regular measurements started in 1833, with an average of 22 °C. Precipitation during July was close to normal at the official weather station in Uccle; most regions however received less than 20% of the normal amount of rain for the month, which was especially true for the western part of the country.

As a whole, 2 heat waves occurred: the first one between 13 and 27 July (making this the fifth longest heat wave in history) and the second one from 29 July until 7 August. Belgium's official weather service, the KMI, defines a heat wave as a period of at least 5 days with maximum temperatures of 25 °C or higher, of which 3 days require a maximum of 30 °C or more.

=== Croatia ===
Zagreb saw 19 nights in a row where temperature did not fall under 20 °C (68 °F), breaking the previous record that was set in the 2013 heat wave. Despite the lack of extreme temperatures seen the previous summer, the 2018 summer saw temperatures averaging 1.5 to 3.2 °C (2.7 to 5.8 °F) above the mean at all official weather stations and the year as a whole was the hottest on record in Zagreb, which has the tenth oldest contiguously monitoring weather station in the world, operating since 1861.

=== Denmark ===
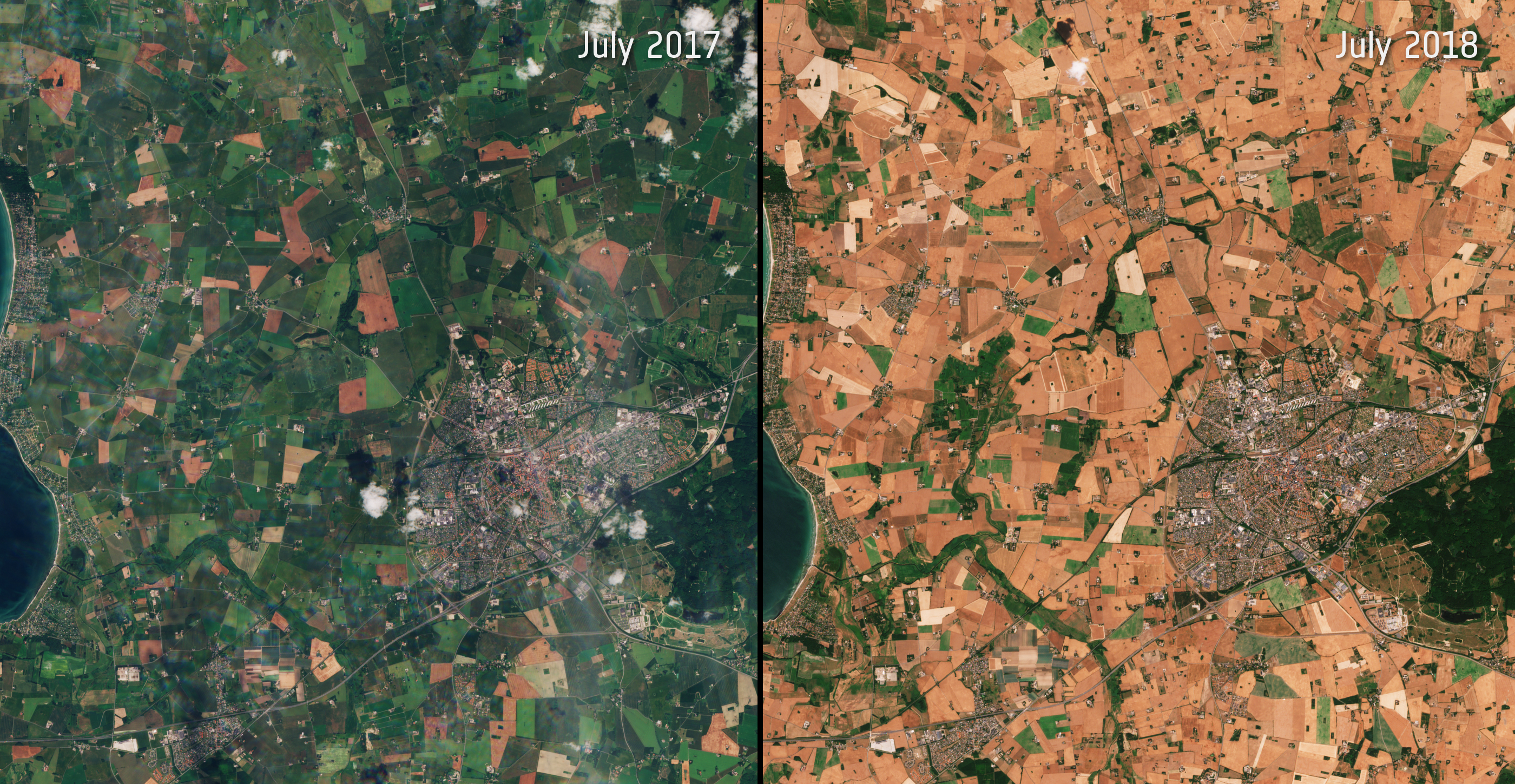
Satellite image comparison of agricultural fields in Slagelse, Zealand in July 2017 and 2018.

The Danish summer was exceptionally dry and warm, and several records were broken: According to the Danish Meteorological Institute, May 2018 had the highest average temperature ever recorded for the month, beating the old record by 1.2 °C (2.2 °F) (recording began in 1879), the highest number of sunny hours recorded in the month (recording began in 1920), the highest temperature recorded in Copenhagen in the month (recording began in 1879), and it was the driest May in a decade. June had the highest average temperature in 26 years and it was the third driest since recording began in 1920. July was the sunniest ever recorded (recording began in 1920), and it was one of the driest and warmest ever recorded (recording began in 1879). The night between 30 and 31 July was the second-warmest on record.

Heat increases the risk of cardiac arrest and other serious conditions in people with poor health. On 8 August, Statens Serum Institut released a report that showed an increase of about 250 deaths, primarily among elderly, in the summer of 2018 (peak in late July) compared to the norm. A similar increase was seen in neighbouring countries affected by the heat wave, including other Scandinavian countries.

The unusually low water-levels in the Gudenå, the longest Danish river, led to fears that the SS Hjejlen would run aground. Because of the drought, farmers experienced a significantly reduced harvest. Outside fires and most types of barbecue grills were initially banned locally and later throughout the country due to the risk of fire. A total of 845 wildfires, both small and large, were recorded from 1 May to 5 July, which is about 500 more than the usual. In July alone there were more than 1,000 wildfires, or almost as many as typical of an entire year. Many foreign tourists, apparently unaware of the record-breaking weather, complained about the lack of air conditioning in hotels, which usually is unnecessary.

=== Finland ===
Finland experienced very high temperatures and drought, and like its neighbouring Scandinavian countries, several wildfires occurred. Its northernmost municipality of Utsjoki, north of the Arctic Circle, experienced a record-breaking temperature of 33.3 °C (92 °F) in July.

=== France ===
The French utility company EDF made known that on the morning of 4 August 2018 it had to shut down reactor number one of the Fessenheim Nuclear Power Plant. This was necessary because the nearby river which is used for cooling water had reached a critical temperature. The white storks in the Alsace region have also been suffering under the drought and heat waves. The 2018 stork generation is generally malnourished. Many are too weak to fly and crash-land when they leave the nest, resulting in fatal injuries like broken legs or wings. But 2018 did not break any temperature records in France.

=== Germany ===
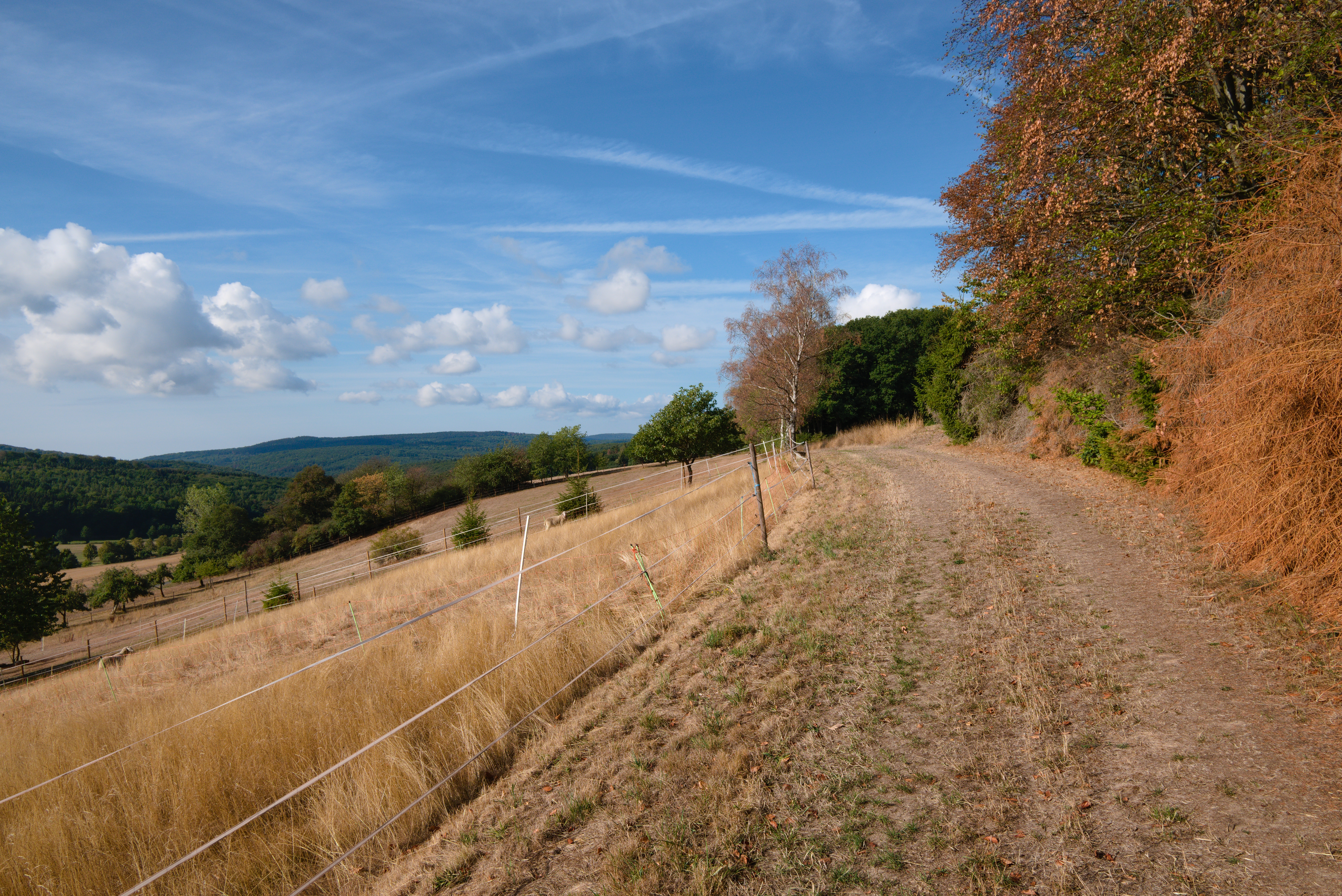
Dried-out trees and grass at the Rhine-Taunus Nature Park in August 2018

Both April and May set new temperature records as the warmest April and May since modern record-keeping began in 1881. June experienced continued heat, with average temperatures 2.4 °C (4.3 °F) above the 1961-1990 mean, while receiving only 57% of expected rainfall; July experienced average temperatures 3.3 °C (5.9 °F) above the reference period and 52% of the expected rain, making it the fourth-warmest July since modern record-keeping began. The period from April–July is also the hottest and driest on record. The heat also caused the deaths of many freshwater fish due to reduced oxygen levels in rivers and ponds, causing firefighters to pump in more water in order to raise the levels. Near Hamburg, almost five tonnes of dead fish were collected by German authorities. On 26 July, regions in Western Germany hit 38 °C (100 °F); on 31 July 2018, the heat traveled further east where some regions hit 39 °C (102 °F). The Rhine and Elbe river recorded high water temperatures causing fish to suffocate, and low water levels made shipping worse. The overnight low in Berlin between 31 July and 1 August was 24.4 °C (75.9 °F), the city's warmest night since 1905. On 31 July, temperature reached 39.5 °C (103.1 °F) in Bernburg, coming 0.8 °C (1.4 °F) shy of the all-time German temperature record set in 2015. Also on 31 July, the country experienced average highs of 34 °C (93 °F).

German farmers have seen the drought affect their crops, potentially ruining harvests and forcing many to harvest early. There are fears many face bankruptcy in the event of a crop failure. The German Farmer's Association have asked the government for over one billion euros in financial aid, as the expected harvest of rapeseed is down by 30% on last year and grain down by 20%.

Many German nuclear power plants reduced their electricity output, as the river temperatures were too warm to safely absorb the full amount of waste heat from their cooling systems without causing environmental damage (such as fish kills).

=== Greece ===
On 23 July, wildfires started in the areas of Attica, killing 102 people and wounding 172 more, and destroyed or damaged over 1,000 buildings. These are the deadliest wildfires in Greece in living memory. On 24 July a state of emergency was declared near Athens by the government. The cause of the fires is thought to be arson along with the heatwave causing the hot conditions.

The Culture Ministry closed the Acropolis between 2:00 and 5:00 pm. local time on 23 July, since in Greek law, public sites can be closed if temperatures reach 36 °C (97 °F) to prevent ill health.

=== Hungary ===
Water levels on the Danube were extremely low, even breaking records in Central Hungary (Ercsi, Dunaföldvár, and Dunaújváros)

=== Ireland ===
Met Éireann recorded the highest June temperature in more than 40 years. An 11-day heatwave was recorded, making it the longest heatwave in 20 years.

Ireland experienced unseasonably high temperatures, with Shannon Airport recording temperatures at or above 30 °C (86 °F) for five consecutive days from 26 to 30 June. A peak temperature of over 32 °C (90 °F) was recorded on 28 June at the airport.

Absolute drought conditions were recorded at 21 different Met Éireann stations between 22 May and 14 July 2018. Partial drought conditions were also recorded at 10 stations and dry spells were recorded at 5 stations at different times between 28 May and 25 July 2018.

In July 2018, Irish Water issued a six-week hosepipe ban in Greater Dublin to conserve water, before extending the ban nationwide. The hosepipe ban length was also extended, and was eventually lifted on 1 September 2018.

=== Italy ===
A heat wave struck the entire country, while 8 people died in Genoa.

=== Latvia ===
Latvia has seen fires that have destroyed around 25,000 acres (10,000 ha) of land including peat bog, scrubland and forest.

=== Lithuania ===
The Lithuanian government declared a state of emergency for drought.

=== Netherlands ===
In the Netherlands, a heat wave is defined as a period of at least five consecutive days are so called "summery days" (days on which the daily maximum temperature is at least 25 °C (77 °F)), of which at least three days are "tropical" (days on which the daily maximum temperature is at least 30 °C (86 °F)).

The Netherlands experienced a heat wave of 13 days starting with 15 July and to 27 July inclusive, the country's longest since the European heat wave of 2006. The highest temperature of 38.2 °C (100.8 °F) was measured in Arcen, Limburg, on 26 July. In many parts of the country authorities were planning for measures in case of water shortages.

A second heat wave started on 29 July, lasting 10 days until 7 August inclusive.

=== Norway ===
The Norwegian government has imposed water restrictions and the cost of electricity is expected to rise due to a high dependency on hydro-electric generation. In the Banak peninsula in northern Norway a temperature of 32 °C (90 °F) was recorded on 30 July 2018, which is considered extremely unusual for a region located north of the Arctic Circle. In the first half of July there have been more than 40 forest fires. Oslo experienced its warmest summer day for 80 years with the maximum of 34.6 °C (94.3 °F)

=== Poland ===
Polish authorities banned swimming at more than 50 beaches, due to the outbreak of toxic cyanobacteria, forming in warmer waters.

=== Portugal and Spain ===
Portugal and Spain experienced record temperatures.

Portugal's average high temperature was above 40 °C (104 °F) for 3 consecutive days (40.1 °C, 40.9 °C and 41.6 °C, respectively 2, 3 and 4 August) and 6 different municipalities recorded temperatures at or above 46 °C (115 °F) with 46.8 °C (116.2 °F) being recorded at Alvega on 4 August.

Lisbon set the highest temperature of 44 °C (111 °F) on 4 August.

In Spain, 9 people died due to the heat wave.

The 2018 heat wave in Catalonia took place from 25 July to 6 August.

After three very dry years, drought conditions in Catalonia were widespread, but the rain of the first four months of the 2018 was higher than the climatic average and the agriculture recovered from the water deficit. The spring was not very warm and the heat of summer came suddenly. July was warm. The first heat wave did not produce deaths, but the second one was really deadly: the Public Health Agency of Catalonia (Aspcat) estimated that 23 people died from heat stroke. Most of the deaths were in the same city of Barcelona (eleven), six in the province of Barcelona, four in Tarragona-Terres de l'Ebre, one in Girona and one in Lleida. Ten people suffered heat stroke at home, thirteen on the street and six were at work or doing sport activities. The 'Health care telephone' received 453 calls during the heat wave related to the high temperature. Blood donations fall 40% due to the heat wave.

According to the Meteorological Service of Catalonia, the warmest days were 4 and 5 August. On Saturday 4, 42.3 °C were reached at the Ebre Observatory (Roquetes, Baix Ebre), 41.4 °C at Benissanet (Ribera d'Ebre) and values from 38 °C to 40 °C were recorded in various coastal areas and even by the sea. On Sunday 5, very high registers were repeated in the same sectors, up to 41.6 °C in Vinebre (Ribera d'Ebre).

The minimum temperature also stayed very high during the weekend, with some values around 30 °C in the Empordà coast (NE of Catalonia) and in the center of the city of Barcelona. The automatic weather station of Portbou (Alt Empordà) registered two consecutive nights above 30 °C, with a minimum record of 31.0 °C throughout day 4 (0-24h UTC). The night from Saturday to Sunday was exceptional in Roses (Alt Empordà), since from midnight the temperature did not fall below 31.9 °C, although at night it had measured 29.3 °C. Between Saturday and Sunday, the weather observer from L'Estartit (Baix Empordà) measured the warmest night of its 49 years of data: 29.2 °C of minimum temperature. The Raval automatic weather station in the centre of Barcelona city did not drop from 29.8 °C during the night from Saturday to Sunday and the minimum temperature was 29.4 °C on Saturday 4th. Also in Barcelona city, the station of Can Bruixa (31 years of data) measured a minimum temperature of 29.9 °C. These high minimum temperature values represent the highest minimum temperature since 1780 in Barcelona city.

=== Sweden ===
May 2018 was the warmest May and July 2018 was the warmest July ever recorded in Sweden. In Stockholm, the previous monthly record of May was 13.9 °C (57.0 °F) recorded in 1993, while the recorded monthly average of May 2018 reached 16.1 °C (61.0 °F). In Stockholm the monthly average of July reached 22.5 °C (72.5 °F), making it the hottest month on record. Sweden also experienced widespread drought. More than 50 wildfires, ranging from north of the Arctic Circle to the southernmost county of Scania, occurred and have been called the most serious in the country in modern history by the Swedish Civil Contingencies Agency. They burned over 25,000 ha (62,000 acres), with 13,000 ha (32,000 acres) in its central Kårböle region. On 30 July 2018, the Swedish government offered SEK 1,200,000,000 in financial assistance to drought-stricken farmers; one farmer said their losses could be around SEK 500,000. Extreme forest fires and continuous drought conditions due to high temperatures caused short supplies for animal food, forcing farmers to resort to imports.

On 30 July, the Swedish nuclear power plant Ringhals-2 was shut down, as the temperature in Kattegat sea waters exceeded the design limit 25 °C for the reactor cooling system. Ringhals 2 reopened on 3 August.

=== Switzerland ===
Switzerland had the warmest April–July period since meteorological records began in 1864. Likewise, 2018 broke the record for the least rainfall in any April–July period since 1864. Fearing wildfires, authorities banned outdoor fires in the canton of Valais and in the Rhine river valley of Grisons. 18 of the 26 cantons have restricted outdoor fires in some way.

=== United Kingdom ===
From the start of June to mid-July the UK underwent their driest summer in modern records. A heatwave was officially declared on 22 June and it caused widespread drought, hosepipe bans and the 2018 United Kingdom wildfires. These series of wildfires worst affected moorland areas of the UK around the Greater Manchester region, the largest of which being at Saddleworth Moor and Winter Hill which together burned over 14 square miles (36 km^{2}) over a period of nearly a month. On 29 June, Northern Ireland Water introduced the first hosepipe ban in Northern Ireland since 1995. The highest temperature reached according to the Met Office was 35.3 °C (95.5 °F) in Faversham, Kent on 26 July.

== See also ==
- 2003 European heat wave
- 2006 European heat wave
- 2018 heat wave
- 2019 European heat waves
- 2022 European heat waves
