= Reesdorf =

Reesdorf may refer to:

- Reesdorf, Schleswig-Holstein, municipality in the district of Rendsburg-Eckernförde, in Schleswig-Holstein, Germany
- Reesdorf (Möckern), a village and a former municipality in the Jerichower Land district, in Saxony-Anhalt, Germany
