= Schopsdorf =

- Ortsteil of Genthin
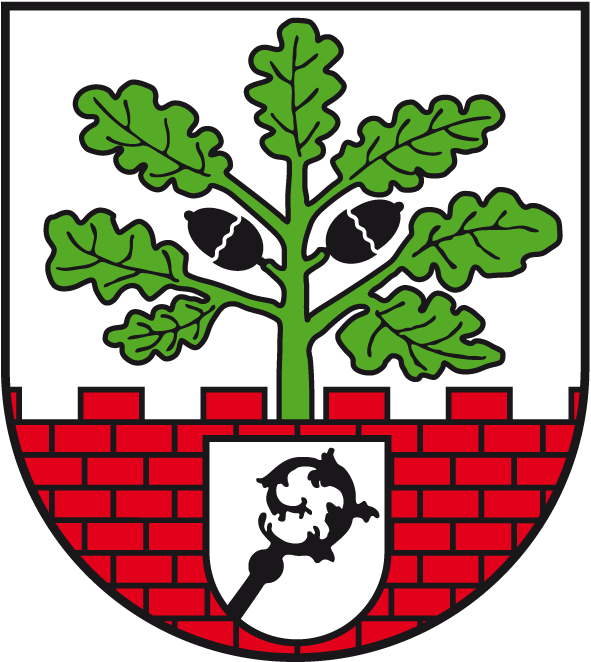
- Coat of arms
- Interactive map of Schopsdorf
- Location within Germany Location within Saxony-Anhalt
- Coordinates: 52°14′N 12°13′E
- Country: Germany
- State: Saxony-Anhalt
- District: Jerichower Land
- Town: Genthin
- Subdivisions: 2

Area
  - Total: 6.55 km^{2} (2.53 sq mi)
- Elevation: 63 m (207 ft)

Population (2010-12-31)
  - Total: 263
  - Density: 40.2/km^{2} (104/sq mi)
- Time zone: UTC+01:00 (CET)
  - Summer (DST): UTC+02:00 (CEST)
- Postal codes: 39291
- Dialling codes: 039225
- Vehicle registration: JL

Schopsdorf is a former municipality in the Jerichower Land district, in Saxony-Anhalt, Germany. It is part of the Verwaltungsgemeinschaft Möckern-Loburg-Fläming. A hammed merger with the town Möckern was repealed by the administrative court in Dessau in August 2011. Since 1 July 2012, it is part of the town Genthin.
