= Schweinitz =

- Stadtteil of Möckern
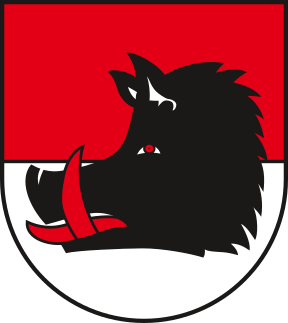
- Coat of arms
- Interactive map of Schweinitz
- Location within Germany Location within Saxony-Anhalt
- Coordinates: 52°06′29″N 12°11′36″E
- Country: Germany
- State: Saxony-Anhalt
- District: Jerichower Land
- Town: Möckern

Area
  - Total: 35.80 km^{2} (13.82 sq mi)
- Elevation: 95 m (312 ft)

Population (2006-12-31)
  - Total: 287
  - Density: 8.02/km^{2} (20.8/sq mi)
- Time zone: UTC+01:00 (CET)
  - Summer (DST): UTC+02:00 (CEST)
- Postal codes: 39279
- Dialling codes: 039245
- Vehicle registration: JL
- Website: www.moeckern-flaeming.de

Schweinitz is a village and a former municipality in the Jerichower Land district, in Saxony-Anhalt, Germany. Since 1 January 2009, it is part of the town Möckern.
