= Krüssau =

- Stadtteil of Möckern
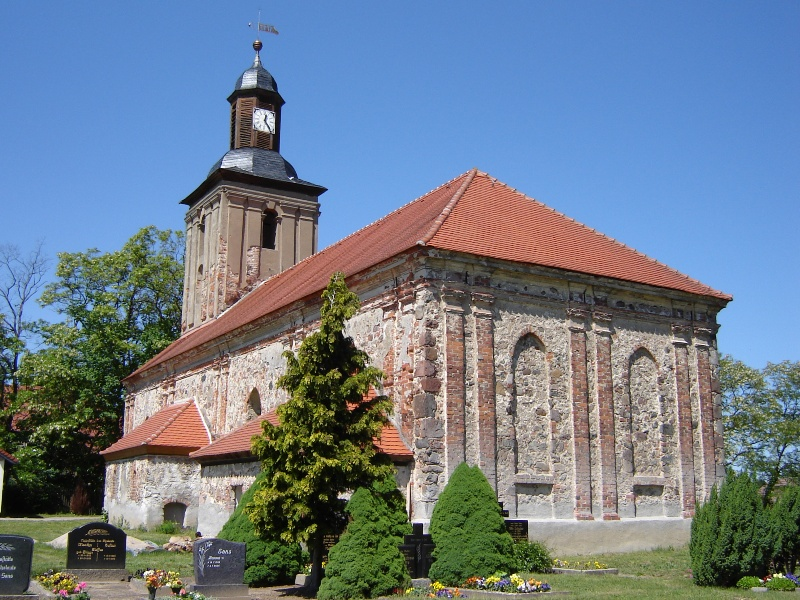
- Church

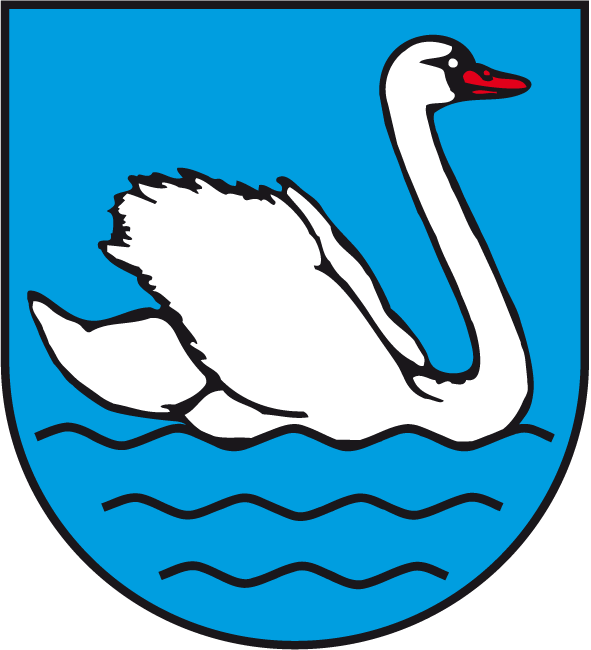
- Coat of arms
- Interactive map of Krüssau
- Location within Germany Location within Saxony-Anhalt
- Coordinates: 52°16′N 12°4′E
- Country: Germany
- State: Saxony-Anhalt
- District: Jerichower Land
- Town: Möckern

Area
  - Total: 21.59 km^{2} (8.34 sq mi)
- Elevation: 51 m (167 ft)

Population (2006-12-31)
  - Total: 253
  - Density: 11.7/km^{2} (30.4/sq mi)
- Time zone: UTC+01:00 (CET)
  - Summer (DST): UTC+02:00 (CEST)
- Postal codes: 39291
- Dialling codes: 039223

Krüssau is a village and a former municipality in the Jerichower Land district, in Saxony-Anhalt, Germany.

Since 1 January 2010, it is part of the town Möckern.
