= Tadeusz Gebethner =

Polish footballer and soldier (1897–1944)

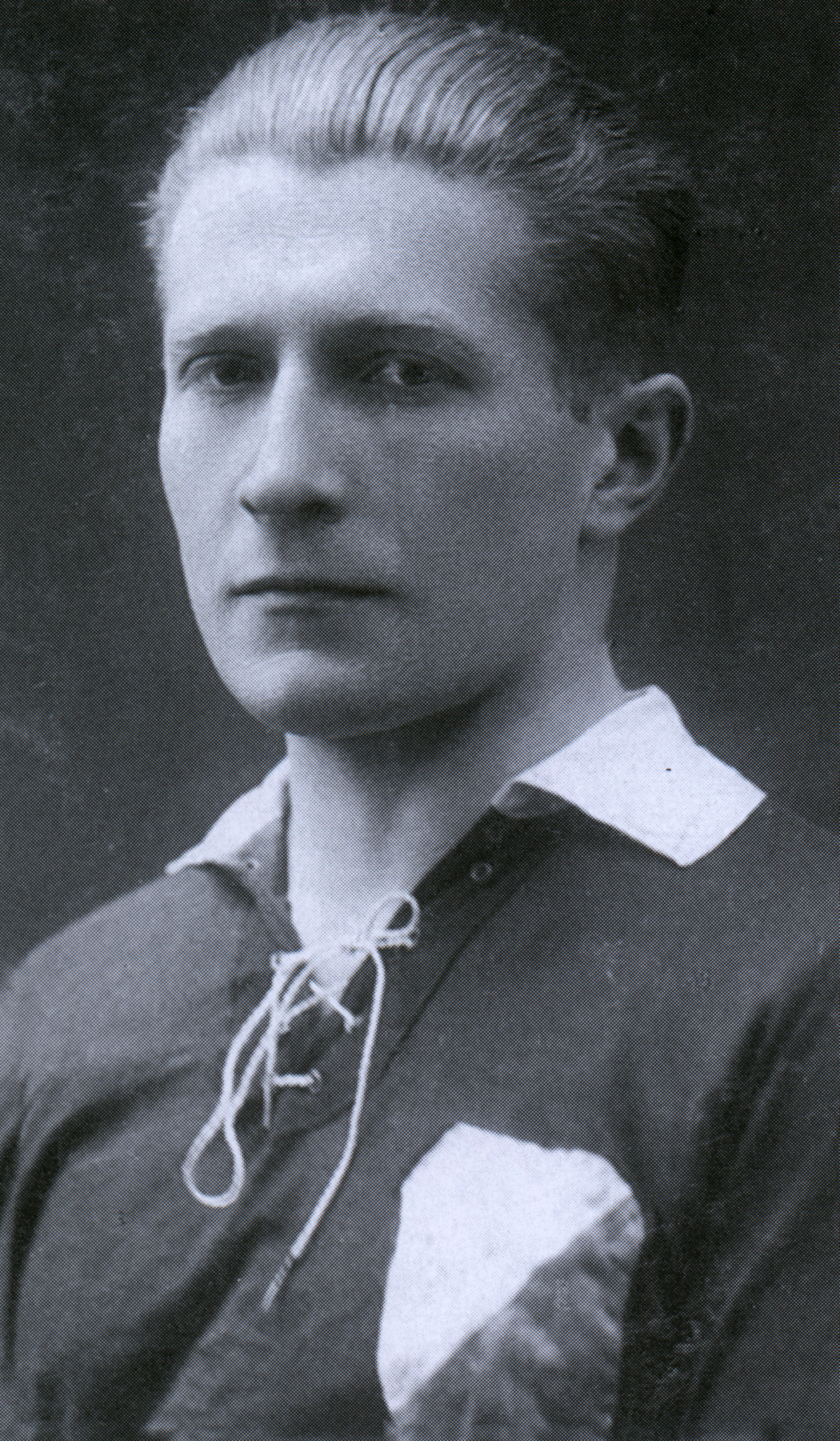
- Tadeusz Gebethner, c. before 1925.
- Born: 18 November 1897; Warsaw, Congress Poland, Russian Empire
- Died: 14 October 1944 (aged 46); Stalag XI-A, Nazi Germany
- Burial place: Stalag XI-A; symbolic grave in Powązki Cemetery
- Education: Warsaw School of Economics
- Military career
- Allegiance: Second Polish Republic; Polish government-in-exile
- Service years: 1918–1944
- Rank: Cavalry captain (rotmistrz)
- Conflicts: Polish–Soviet War; World War II; September Campaign (1939); Battle of Grodno; Warsaw Uprising (1944)
- Awards: Righteous Among the Nations

Tadeusz Jerzy Gebethner (18 November 1897 – 14 October 1944) was a Polish soldier, insurgent, bookseller, and footballer. From 1914 to 1925 he was an active player and captain of the Polonia Warsaw team; later he worked in his family bookstore and publishing business (Gebethner i Wolff). Tadeusz Gebethner fought in the Polish–Soviet War and Polish September Campaign. Becoming an officer of the Home Army after the invasion, from 1942 he sheltered a Jewish family in his home in Warsaw during the German occupation. A participant of the Warsaw Uprising, he was critically wounded and taken prisoner to Stalag-XIA, where he died from the same injuries on 14 October 1944. For his wartime activities, he was recognised as one of the Polish Righteous Among the Nations in 1981.

== Biography ==
=== Early life ===
Tadeusz Jerzy Gebethner was born on 18 November 1897 in Warsaw into the Gebethner family. His father, Jan Robert Gebethner was a bookseller, publisher, and co-owner of the Gebethner i Wolff company. His mother, Maria Gebethner née Herse, was a co-owner of the clothing store Boguslaw Herse Fashion House. He attended the real school of Emilian Konopczyński in Warsaw, passing his matura exams in 1916 and later studied in the Warsaw School of Economics.

Since his youth, Gebethner was interested in football. He was one of the co-founders of the Polonia Warsaw football club in 1915; he became its first president and was an active player with the club until 1925.

Gebethner paused his studies and sports career to join the 5th Zasław Ułan Regiment during the Polish–Soviet War and took part in fighting around Lwów (now Lviv, Ukraine) in 1920. After the war, he took part in promoting Polish sports in Upper Silesia during the 1921 Upper Silesia plebiscite. For a short period, he was a chairman of another sports club Polonia Bytom, although the title might have been just honorary.

He resumed his studies and sport activities afterwards. In 1921, together with the Polonia Warsaw team, Gebethner won the title of vice-champion of Poland in the 1921 Polish Football Championship. Between 1915 and 1925, he played a total of 137 official matches for his parent club, serving as team captain for most of them.

He ended his football career at the age of 28 and devoted himself to professional work in the family bookselling and publishing enterprise (Gebethner i Wolff). In the years 1928 to 1934, he served on the Main Board of the Polish Booksellers' Association. He still occasionally participated in Polonia Warsaw matches, and he was a known figure in Varsovian cultural circles. His associates and friends included Zofia Nałkowska, Juliusz Żuławski, Kornel Makuszyński, Mira Zimińska-Sygietyńska, Jan Lechoń (a former classmate), and Władysław Reymont (a neighbour).

== World War II ==
After World War II began with the German invasion of Poland in September 1939, as a lieutenant of the reserve Gebethner was mobilised and joined the 102 Reserve Ulhan Regiment. Following the Soviet invasion of Poland which occurred shortly afterward, he took part in the Battle of Grodno. Shortly thereafter, together with most of his unit, he crossed the Polish-Lithuanian border and was interned in the camp in Rokiškis. Gebethner escaped from the camp and moved to Wilno (now Vilnius, Lithuania), where he became involved in the Polish resistance (Union of Armed Struggle) and organised more escapes from the Rokiškis camp (following the Soviet occupation of the Baltic states, many of the Polish officers still there perished in the Katyn massacre). In 1941, he returned to Warsaw and joined the Home Army (Armia Krajowa).

In the years 1942 to 1944, he helped to save a Jewish family of three (the Abrahamers), for whom he arranged shelter in his home and other support, including arranging for fake documents (Kennkarte), medical care, and bribing the Blue Police when the family was discovered. Eventually he was able to arrange their evacuation to Hungary. The Abrahamer family survived the war thanks to this. He also convinced the Home Army not to execute Józef Retinger.

During the Warsaw Uprising he served in the 3rd Armored Battalion (the Golski Battalion) of the Home Army. He was seriously injured in the fighting, losing an arm and a leg. After the capitulation of the Polish insurgents, he was interned in Stalag XI-A Altengrabow in the Magdeburg area. He died in a nearby hospital on 14 October 1944, at the age of 46, as a result of wounds received during the Uprising. He was buried there, but the cemetery was destroyed by the Red Army during post-war military base construction. Later he received a symbolic grave in the Varsovian Powązki Cemetery.

He was promoted to rotmistrz (cavalry captain) either on 11 September or posthumously.

== Remembrance ==
For his wartime activities, in 1981 he was recognised by Yad Vashem as one of the Polish Righteous Among the Nations.

In 2022, his story was used in educational materials prepared by the British Holocaust Educational Trust for the Premier League youth.
