= Dörnitz =

- Stadtteil of Möckern
- Coat of arms
- Interactive map of Dörnitz
- Location within Germany Location within Saxony-Anhalt
- Coordinates: 52°13′N 12°12′E
- Country: Germany
- State: Saxony-Anhalt
- District: Jerichower Land
- Town: Möckern

Area
  - Total: 17.37 km^{2} (6.71 sq mi)
- Elevation: 87 m (285 ft)

Population (2006-12-31)
  - Total: 258
  - Density: 14.9/km^{2} (38.5/sq mi)
- Time zone: UTC+01:00 (CET)
  - Summer (DST): UTC+02:00 (CEST)
- Postal codes: 39291
- Dialling codes: 039225
- Website: www.moeckern-flaeming.de

Dörnitz is a village and a former municipality in the Jerichower Land district, in Saxony-Anhalt, Germany. Since 1 January 2009, it is part of the town Möckern.
