= Reesdorf (Möckern) =

- Stadtteil of Möckern
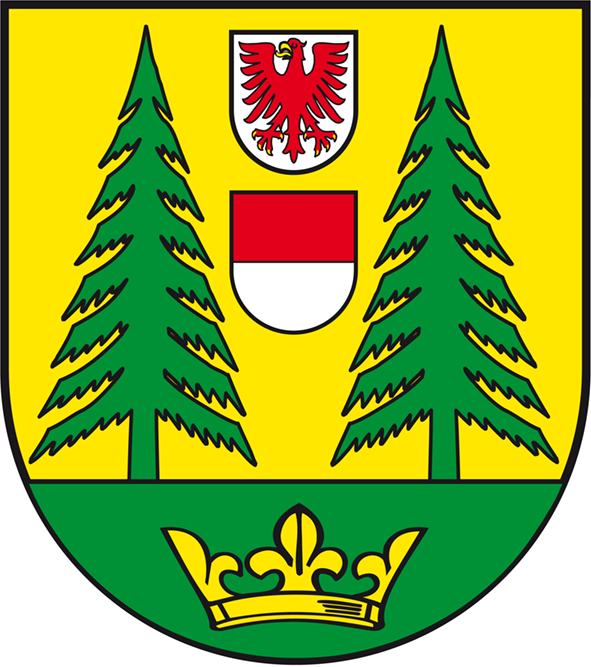
- Coat of arms
- Interactive map of Reesdorf
- Location within Germany Location within Saxony-Anhalt
- Coordinates: 52°14′N 12°10′E
- Country: Germany
- State: Saxony-Anhalt
- District: Jerichower Land
- Town: Möckern

Area
  - Total: 3.32 km^{2} (1.28 sq mi)
- Elevation: 69 m (226 ft)

Population (2006-12-31)
  - Total: 163
  - Density: 49.1/km^{2} (127/sq mi)
- Time zone: UTC+01:00 (CET)
  - Summer (DST): UTC+02:00 (CEST)
- Postal codes: 39291
- Dialling codes: 039225

Reesdorf is a village and former municipality in the Jerichower Land district in Saxony-Anhalt, Germany. In July 2009, it was merged into the town of Möckern.
