= Möckern-Loburg-Fläming =

Coordinates: 52°08′N 11°57′E

Möckern-Loburg-Fläming (until July 2007: "Möckern-Fläming") is a former Verwaltungsgemeinschaft ("collective municipality") in the Jerichower Land district, in Saxony-Anhalt, Germany. It is situated approximately 30 km east of Magdeburg. The seat of the Verwaltungsgemeinschaft was in Möckern. It was disbanded on 1 July 2012, when Schopsdorf joined the town of Genthin.

== Subdivision ==
The Verwaltungsgemeinschaft Möckern-Loburg-Fläming consisted of the following municipalities:

1. Möckern
2. Schopsdorf
