= Drewitz =

- Stadtteil of Möckern
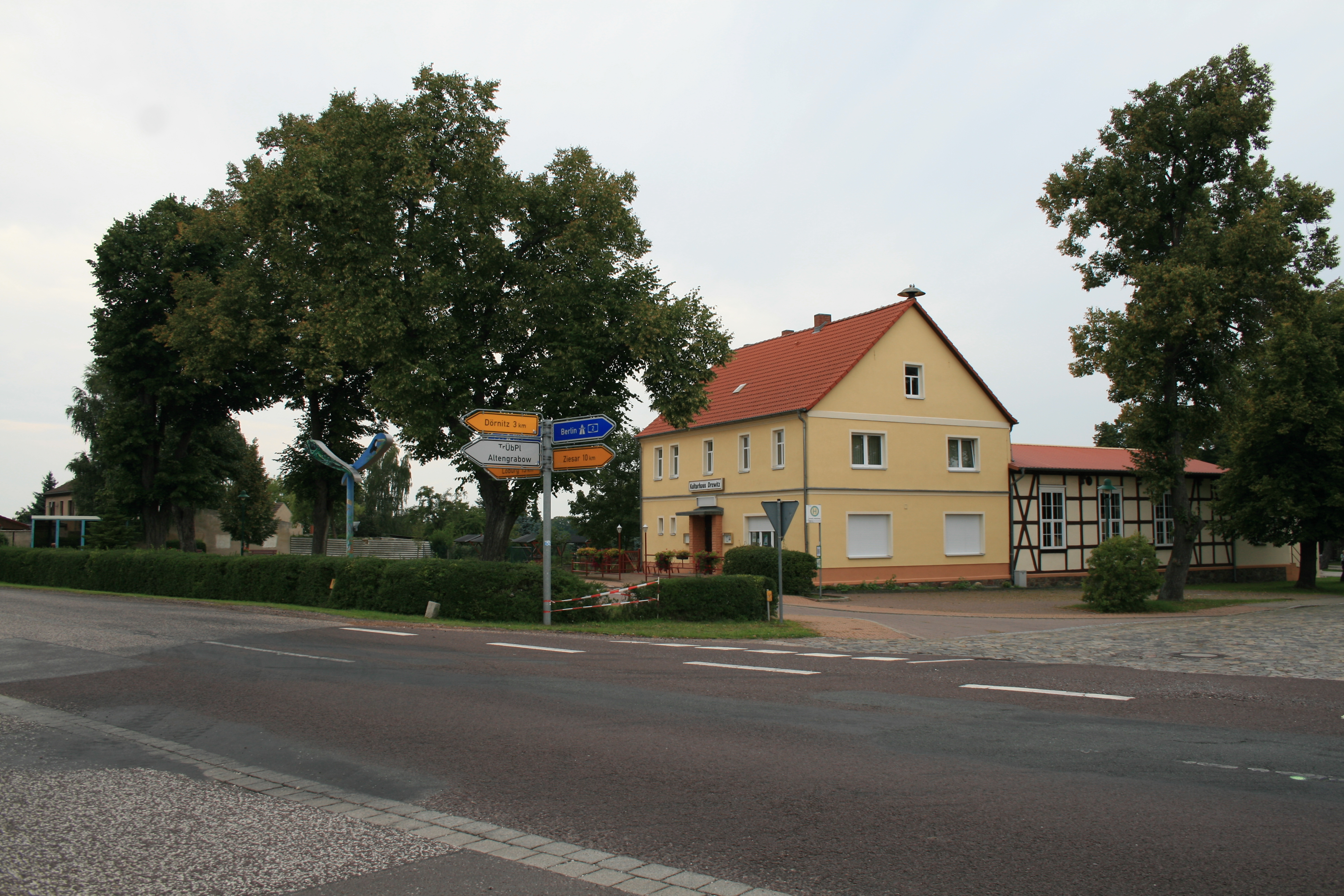

- Coat of arms
- Interactive map of Drewitz
- Location within Germany Location within Saxony-Anhalt
- Coordinates: 52°12′48″N 12°09′59″E
- Country: Germany
- State: Saxony-Anhalt
- District: Jerichower Land
- Town: Möckern

Area
  - Total: 8.09 km^{2} (3.12 sq mi)
- Elevation: 94 m (308 ft)

Population (2006-12-31)
  - Total: 409
  - Density: 50.6/km^{2} (131/sq mi)
- Time zone: UTC+01:00 (CET)
  - Summer (DST): UTC+02:00 (CEST)
- Postal codes: 39291
- Dialling codes: 039225
- Vehicle registration: JL

Drewitz is a village and a former municipality in the Jerichower Land district, in Saxony-Anhalt, in eastern Germany.

Since 1 January 2010, it has been part of the town Möckern.
