= Aga vom Hagen =

German painter

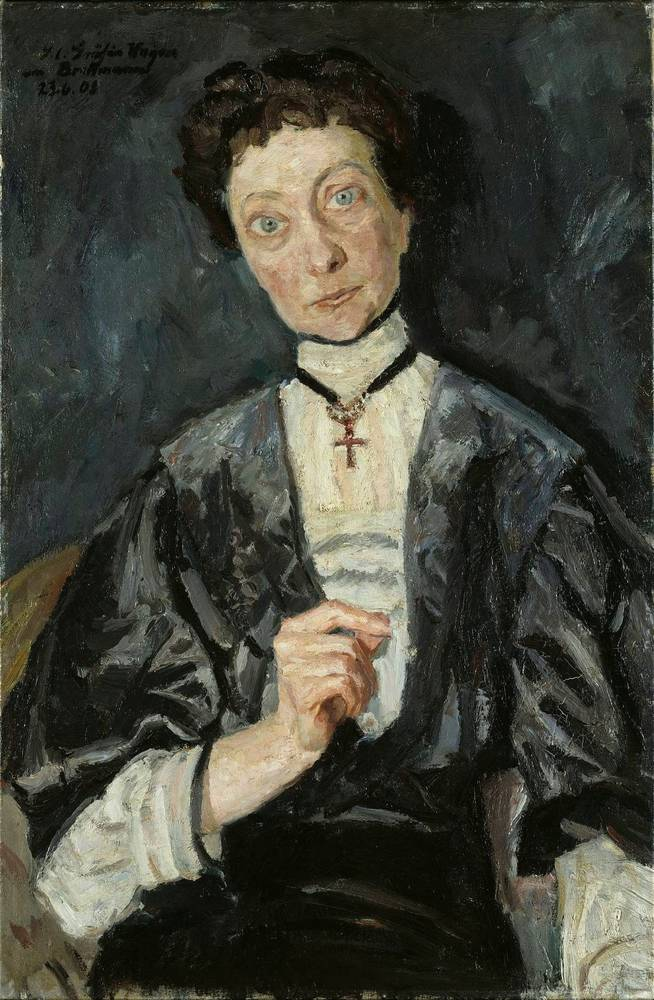
Portrait of Augusta Countess vom Hagen by Max Beckmann (1908).

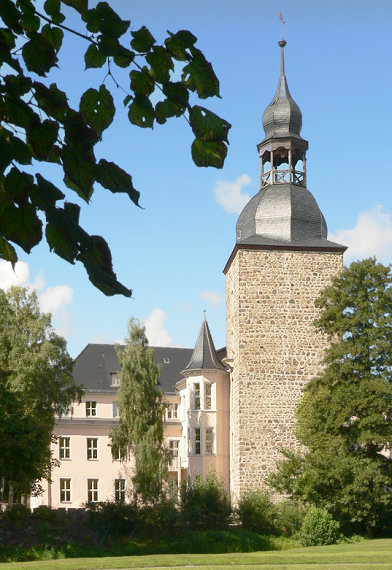
Schloss Möckern – ancestral home of Aga vom Hagen

Augusta ("Aga") Clara Elisabeth Gräfin vom Hagen (January 2, 1872, in Möckern – April 8, 1949, in Schlieben) was a German painter, author and art patron.

== Life ==
She was descended from the noble family of vom Hagen in Eichsfeld, which was raised to count status. She is the daughter of Hilmar Friedrich Anton Graf vom Hagen and his wife Martha von der Schulenburg and was born in 1872 at Schloss Möckern. There she grew up together with six siblings and received private lessons. Countess Aga vom Hagen studied painting with Reinhold Lepsius and Lovis Corinth and other renowned artists of her time. From 1904 she lived in Paris to perfect her artistic skills as a painter at the academy of arts there. One of her teachers there was Claudio Castelucho. She became permanent friends with Max Beckmann, Alfred Kerr and Carl Sternheim.

Upon returning to Germany, vom Hagen settled in Berlin, maintained a house there, and supported contemporary artists. Max Beckmann portrayed her in 1908 and captured her in his work Die Auferstehung a year later.

At the beginning of the First World War in 1914, Aga vom Hagen volunteered for the medical service. She was deployed to military hospitals on the Western Front. There, two years later in Brussels, she met the writer Carl Einstein, who had been married to Maria Ramm since 1913 and was the father of a young daughter. A love affair developed with him. The dramatist Carl Sternheim immortalized this concubinage in his novel Ulrike, published in Leipzig in 1918.

After the end of the war Aga vom Hagen became a member of the KPD and was therefore nicknamed the Red Countess. During this time, Aga vom Hagen lived together with Carl Einstein, whose marriage wasn't ended until 1923, at Matthäikirchstraße 14 in Berlin-Frohnau. After Einstein had met the Frankfurt banker's daughter Tony Simon-Wolfskehl at the end of 1922 and wanted to marry her, Aga vom Hagen stayed at Schloss Möckern with the family of her brother Rüdiger Graf vom Hagen more and more frequently. She became involved in social matters, wrote poems as well as a play and devoted herself to painting. Later, she moved permanently to Möckern. There, she experienced the Soviet occupation in May 1945, and the expropriation of her parents' property by the land reform in September 1945.

== Death and legacy ==
In 1946, Aga vom Hagen was arrested and taken to the Soviet special camp Schlieben. She was banned from returning home, and died in this camp in 1949.

In February 2013, after 75 years, parts of the play Gefecht bei Möckern, written by Aga vom Hagen in 1938, were publicly performed again in Möckern.

Angelika Gräfin vom Hagen and Stefanie Fabian determined in 2019:

Detailed research into the life and work of A. vom Hagen is still pending [...]

— Angelika Gräfin vom Hagen/Stefanie Fabian, Hagen, Augusta Clara Elisabeth (Aga) Gräfin vom Hagen. In Frauen in Sachsen-Anhalt 2, Köln u. a., 2019, S. 192

== Works ==
- Die Hunderassen. Ein Handbuch für Hundeliebhaber und Züchter, Potsdam, Athenaion, 1. Aufl., 1935; 8., neubearbeitete und erweiterte Aufl. 1943.
