= Möckern =

- Town
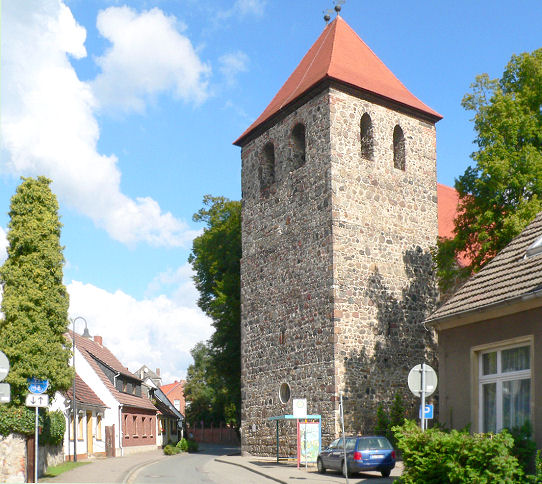
- Church of Saint Lawrence

- Coat of arms

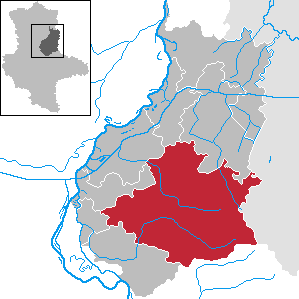
- Location of Möckern within Jerichower Land district
- Interactive map of Möckern
- Location within Germany Location within Saxony-Anhalt
- Coordinates: 52°8′26″N 11°57′9″E
- Country: Germany
- State: Saxony-Anhalt
- District: Jerichower Land

Government
  - Mayor (2022–29): Doreen Krüger

Area
  - Total: 530.19 km^{2} (204.71 sq mi)
- Elevation: 64 m (210 ft)

Population (2025-12-31)
  - Total: 12,437
  - Density: 23.458/km^{2} (60.755/sq mi)
- Time zone: UTC+01:00 (CET)
  - Summer (DST): UTC+02:00 (CEST)
- Postal codes: 39291, 39279
- Dialling codes: 039221, 039223, 039225, 039244, 039245
- Vehicle registration: JL
- Website: www.moeckern-flaeming.de

Möckern (German pronunciation: [ˈmœkɐn]) is a town in the Jerichower Land district, in Saxony-Anhalt, in east-central Germany. It is situated east of Magdeburg. The Battle of Möckern took place south of the town in 1813.

== History ==
=== Medieval period ===
Möckern was originally called "Mokrianici" by the Slavs who settled in the area in the 7th and 8th centuries. The name meant a humid place, a reference to the formation, at that time, of extensive marshes around the Ehle River. By the middle of the 10th century, the settlement was an established German burgward, but it is believed that by the end of the 9th century, the settlement was already under German influence. As such, the burgward was obliged by a document from Otto I the Great in 948 to pay a tithe to the Magdeburg Moritz monastery. This document is considered to be the first mention of the place. At this period, a fortress was built on the site of the old Slavic settlement, and its keep is still part of the fortress today. The castle served as an outpost to protect Magdeburg and secured the important roads to Brandenburg and Zerbst. In 955, Otto I is supposed to have founded Möckern's parish church, following his victory over Hungary on August 10 of that year. Because that day is St. Lawrence Day, the church was named for the saint. In the 11th century, Möckern acquired a defensive wall (made of boulders since the 12th century), which was equipped with three gates. Möckern already had its town charter.

Over the centuries, the sovereignty of Möckern took several twists and turns. In the 12th century, the Margrave of Brandenburg had sovereignty, but in 1196, Otto II, Margrave of Brandenburg gave it to the bishopric of Magdeburg. By the 14th century, Möckern had become the property of Quedlinburg Abbey, which, with the town as a manor, the Count of Arnstein mortgaged. In 1376, the abbey gave Brandenburg back its sovereignty. After that, Möckern was mortgaged several times, including to a family of nobles and to the bishopric of Magdeburg. In 1472, after several trials, the Prince-Elector of Brandenburg renounced the bishopric in favor of his vassal. Ownership of the fief then went to the Counts of Arnstein-Lindow, who held it until 1524, when they died out. In 1710, ownership went to Christian Wilhelm von Munchausen and in 1742, to another family, which held it until 1945.

=== Modern period ===
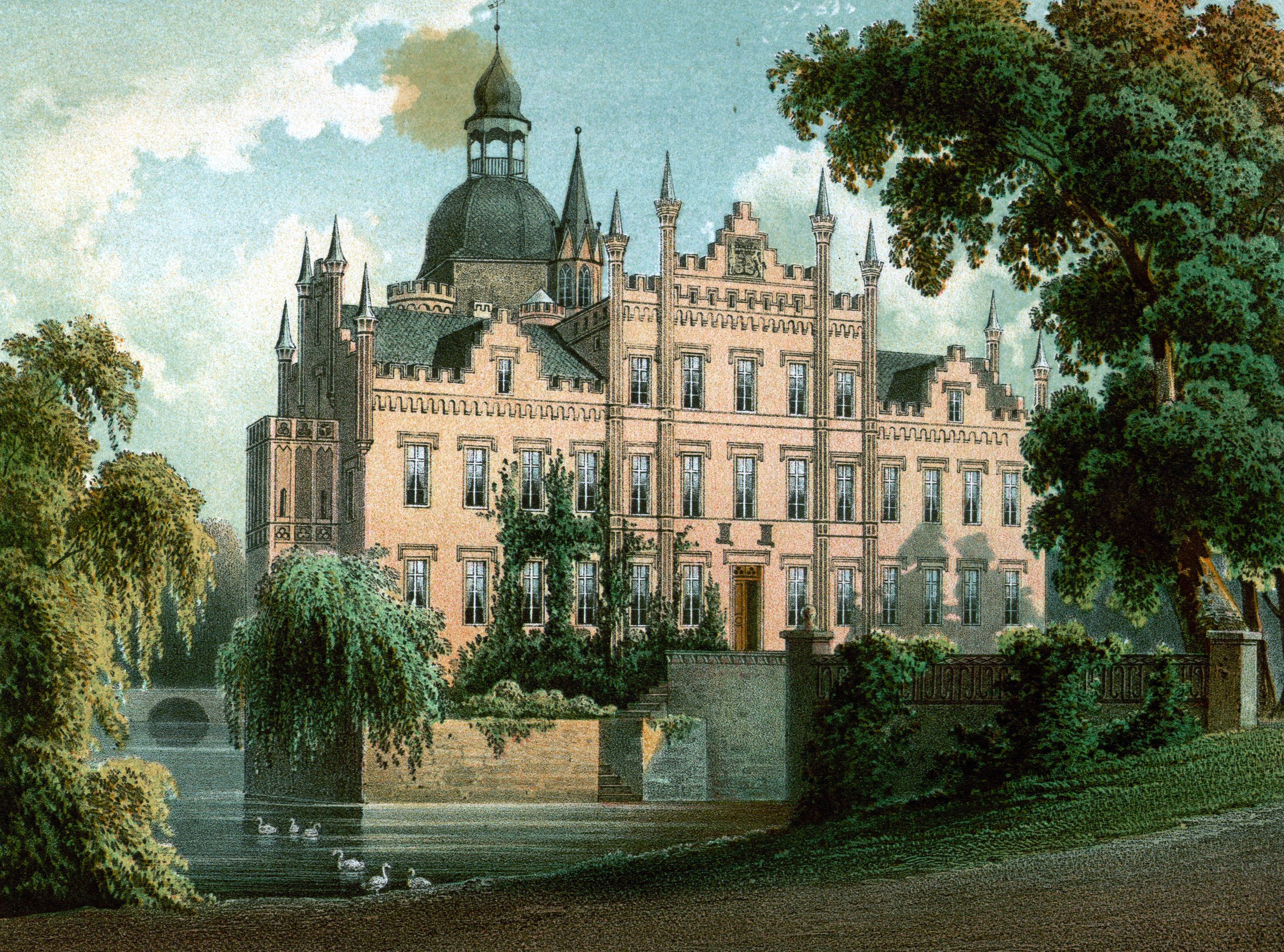
19th-century view of the castle

In the 17th century, the town suffered heavy damage from an occupation in 1626 during the Thirty Years' War and a conflagration in 1688. After 1680, the city belonged to the Brandenburgian Duchy of Magdeburg and was part of the former district of Jerichow. A new town hall was built in 1700 and, in 1715, Münchhausen built a new castle to replace the old fortress. His successor, William Hagen, added on to the castle in 1840.

A series of heavy clashes between allied Prusso-Russian troops and the Napoleonic French army south of Möckern ended in defeat for the French on April 5, 1813. This became the prelude to the war of liberation against Napoleon and is known as the Battle of Möckern.

After Prussia's final victory, the kingdom re-organized the district administration. This brought Möckern into the newly formed Jerichower Land district, with Burg as the urban district. The town had previously been a farming town with breweries and open air markets, but infrastructure began to develop with sawmills, a steam mill and a starch factory, spurred by the 1892 opening of a railway line between Magdeburg and Loburg. In 1895, the former town hall was replaced by a three-story Renaissance-style building. In 1899, the Seventh-day Adventist Church founded the Friedensau Adventist University and the surrounding village near the town. At the end of the 19th century, Möckern had more than 1,700 inhabitants.

=== 20th century ===
The relative prosperity of the town was reflected in the private construction that began in the second half of the 19th century and continued till the beginning of World War I. A row of new streets was built in the western part of town, some with Jugendstil houses.

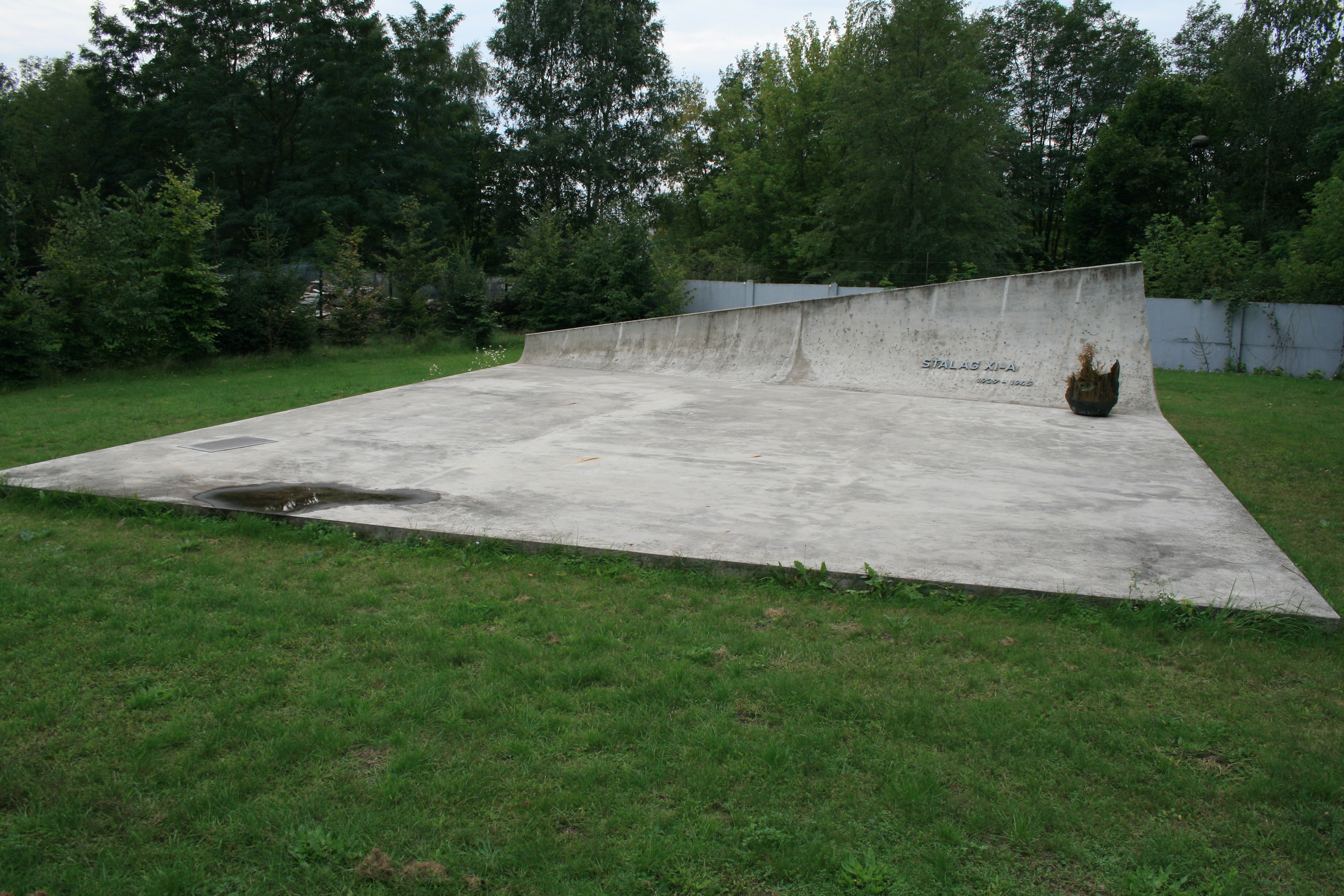
Memorial to the prisoners of Stalag XI-A

During World War II, from 1939 to 1945, Altengrabow (now part of Möckern) was the location of the Stalag XI-A prisoner-of-war camp, in which Polish, French, Belgian, Dutch, British, American, Soviet and other Allied POWs were held. In April 1941, the Stalag 341 POW camp was established in Altengrabow, which was eventually relocated to Slutsk in September 1941. On May 5, 1945 Möckern was occupied by the Red Army, taking the lives of 42 residents.

After the end of World War II the Soviet occupying forces instituted a land reform, confiscating land held by nobility. The Hagen family lost the Möckern castle and a branch of the State Archives Magdeburg was installed there. Territorial reform in 1952 placed Möckern first in the Loburg urban district and later back in the Burg district. In 1964, Möckern had a population of 2,904.

In the 1960s, a large poultry factory was established, among the largest of its kind in East Germany. After German reunification, the plant was taken over by a corporate group, securing 400 jobs for the town. Another major employer manufactures laminate flooring which is sold throughout Europe. The former castle owners, the Hagens, also prospered and, in 1991, they returned to Möckern and re-purchased parts of their former property. The castle, which remained town property, became Möckern's elementary school in 1998, after the state archives moved out. In 2005, despite significant local protest, a remote facility for mentally incompetent criminals was established on a 12-acre (49,000 m^{2}) former army base in the Lochow section of town.

== Geography ==
The territory of the town of Möckern was expanded with 26 former municipalities between 2002 and 2010. In 2002 it absorbed Friedensau, Lübars, Stegelitz and Wörmlitz, in 2003 Büden and Ziepel, in 2004 Hohenziatz, in 2007 Zeppernick, and in 2008 Theeßen. On 1 January 2009 it absorbed the former municipalities Dörnitz, Hobeck, Küsel, Loburg, Rosian, Schweinitz, Tryppehna, Wallwitz and Zeddenick, and on 2 July of the same year Magdeburgerforth and Reesdorf. Drewitz, Grabow, Krüssau, Rietzel, Schopsdorf, Stresow and Wüstenjerichow were absorbed in 2010, but the merger with Schopsdorf was repealed in 2011. Möckern was part of the Verwaltungsgemeinschaft ("collective municipality") Möckern-Loburg-Fläming until it was disbanded in 2012.

=== Divisions ===
The town of Möckern consists of the following 27 Ortschaften or municipal divisions:

- Büden
- Dörnitz
- Drewitz
- Friedensau
- Grabow
- Hobeck
- Hohenziatz
- Krüssau
- Küsel
- Loburg
- Lübars
- Magdeburgerforth
- Möckern
- Reesdorf
- Rietzel
- Rosian
- Schweinitz
- Stegelitz
- Stresow
- Theeßen
- Tryppehna
- Wallwitz
- Wörmlitz
- Wüstenjerichow
- Zeddenick
- Zeppernick
- Ziepel

== Notable people ==
- Aga vom Hagen (1872-1949), German painter, author, and art patron
