= Stalag XI-A =

German World War II prisoner-of-war camp

- Dörnitz, Saxony-Anhalt
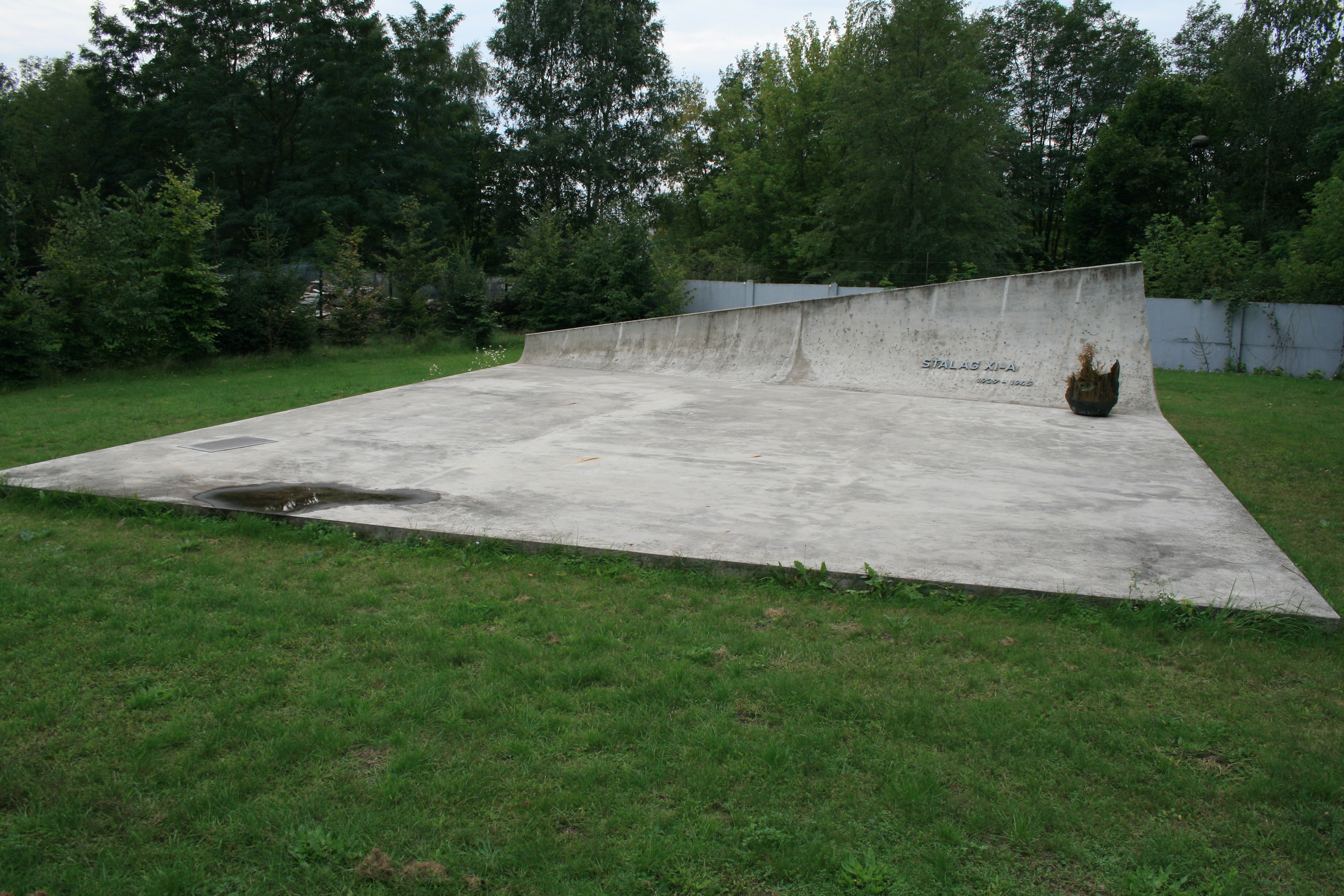
- Memorial to the prisoners of Stalag XI-A

Site information
- Type: Prisoner-of-war camp
- Controlled by: Nazi Germany

Location
- Dörnitz, Germany (pre-war borders, 1937)
- Coordinates: 52.21326°N 12.22207°E

Site history
- In use: 1939–1945
- Battles/wars: World War II

Garrison information
- Occupants: Polish, French, Belgian, Dutch, Serbian, Croatian, British, Soviet, Italian and other Allied prisoners of war

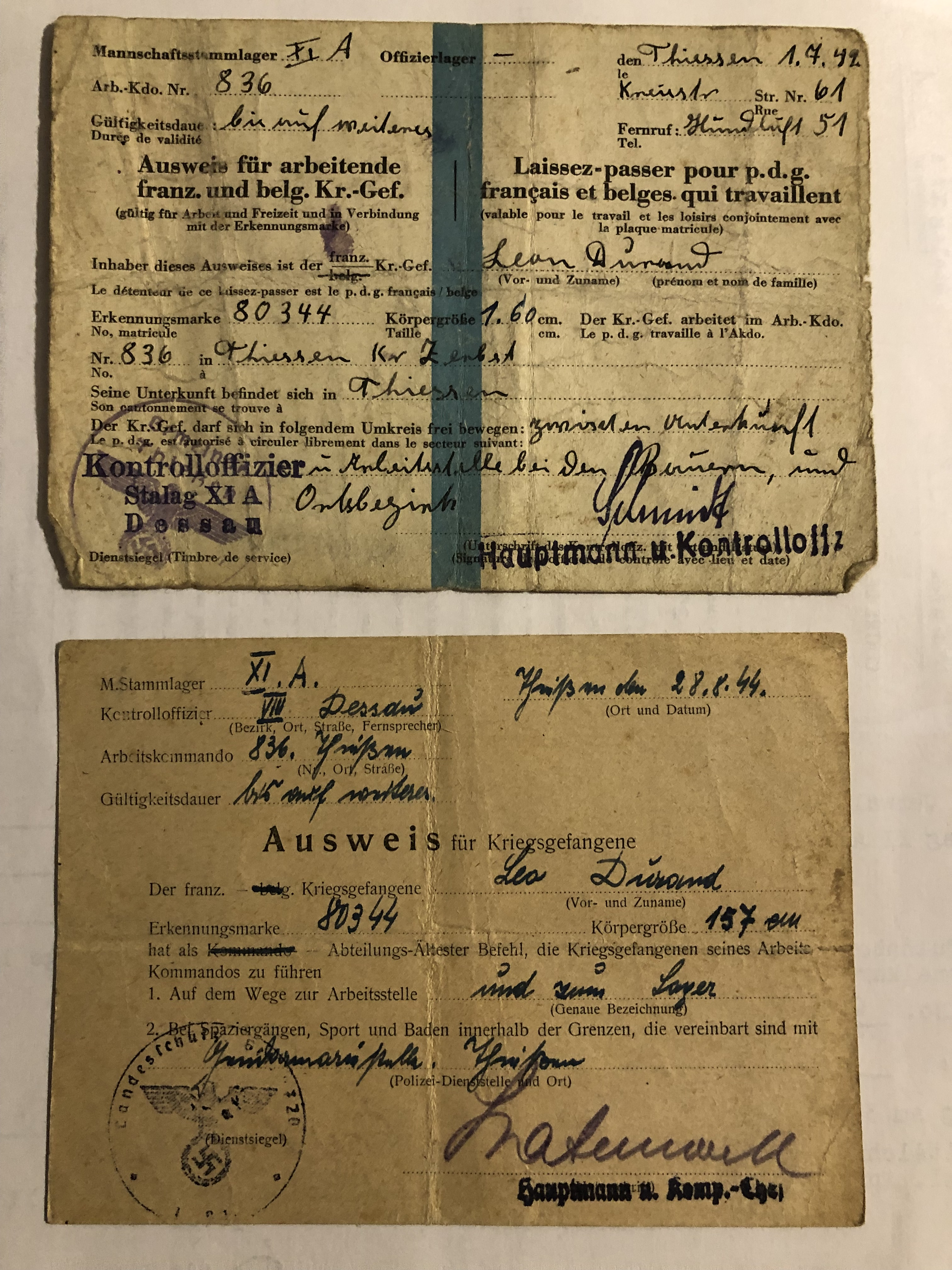
Identification documents (Ausweis) of a French Prisoner of War in Stalag XI-A, Leon Durand, dated 1942 and 1944 respectively. The camp number is hand-written in the top left corner of each. These documents allowed the bearer to be deployed on work details outside the camp.

Stalag XI-A (also known as Stalag 341) was a German World War II prisoner-of-war camp (Stammlager), located just to the east of the village of Altengrabow and in the south of Dörnitz in Saxony-Anhalt, about 90 km (56 mi) south-west of Berlin.

== Camp history ==
=== Pre-war ===
The camp was located on Truppenübungsplatz Altengrabow ("Altengrabow Military Training Area"), which had been in use by the German Army since 1893, and had served as the prisoner-of-war camp Dörnitz Altengrabow during World War I, holding around 12,000 POW of various nationalities.

=== World War II ===
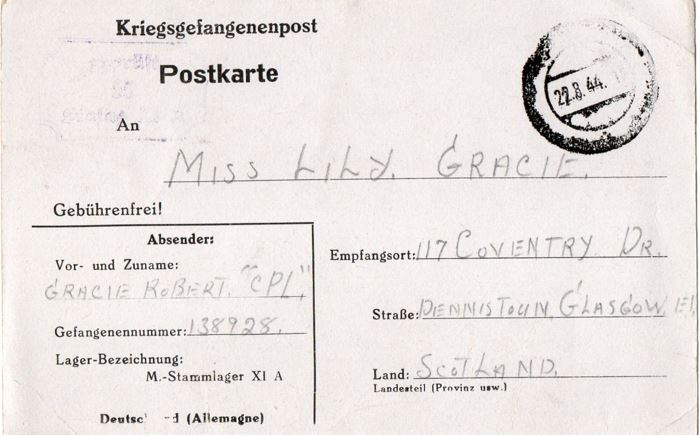
A postcard sent by a Scottish prisoner in Stalag XI-A, Corporal Bobbie Gracie, to family in Glasgow in 1944. The card is printed with the word Kriegsgefangenenpost (POW post) and has the camp number printed at the bottom.

During the German invasion of Poland which started World War II, in September 1939 it again became a prisoner-of-war camp, and was designated Stalag XI, before it was renumbered Stalag XI-A in November 1939. The camp housed Australian, French, British, Belgian, Serb, Russian, Italian, American, Dutch, Slovak, Spanish and Polish PoWs, all in separate compounds, and served as the centre from which most of the PoWs were assigned to Arbeitskommandos ("fatigue details"). On 1 January 1945 more than 60,000 PoWs were registered there.

On 25 April 1945, one of the last airborne operations of the European Theatre, code named Operation Violet, took place. Six teams composed of officers and men of Commonwealth, French and United States armed services and under the command of Major Worrall were to be dropped near the camp to assure the protection of the PoWs, to assess the humanitarian need of the PoWs and to ensure a peaceful handover of the camp into Allied authority. However the teams were scattered during the drop and all members were soon captured and transferred to the Altengrabow camp. There, the new PoWs urged the Camp Commandant, Col. Ochernal to cooperate and a radio link between the camp and SHAEF, then SAARF Headquarters was established.

"On 2 May Worrall received word from SAARF Headquarters that Col. Ochernal had struck an agreement with the Commander of the American 83rd Infantry Division, MG Robert Macon, then headquartered at Zerbst: Macon would provide the trucks necessary to begin the evacuation of POWs to Zerbst, and Ochernal would provide safe conduct for travel."

"On 3 May seventy trucks loaded with rations and thirty ambulances complete with medical teams arrived at Altengrabow to a tumultuous greeting from the POW's. Also in attendance were some forty war correspondents attached to the American Ninth Army who were shepherded by an enthusiastic Public Relations Officer eager to see the liberation of the camp portrayed as an all-American show. The evacuation proceeded with the American, British, French, and Belgian POWs being evacuated first. The Americans had promised to provide a twice daily shuttle service until all of the Western POWs were evacuated. On the afternoon of 4 May the Russian Army arrived at the camp, and the atmosphere changed considerably."

"The balance of the Western POWs, all Frenchmen, were allowed to leave, but the Russians angrily blocked an effort to evacuate a group of Poles who had asked to be repatriated to the West, as well as a group of Italian POWs. The following morning, Worrall, over his protests, was told by the Russians that he and the other SAARF personnel had two hours to get their gear together; then they would be evacuated to the American lines. The Russians would handle all camp-related matters from that point on."

After the war the area was taken over by the Group of Soviet Forces in Germany (GSFG) and was the headquarters of the 10th Guards Uralsko-Lvovskaya Tank Division until 1990. The military base has since been taken over by Bundeswehr and NATO units.

=== Deaths ===
The first Soviet POW arrived in mid-1941, and in November a typhus epidemic broke out in the Russian compound, which remained under quarantine for several months. The number of deaths incurred, assumed to be substantial, are as yet unknown as investigations of the area since the 1990s have discovered no burials, apart from a number of Italian POWs, whose remains were returned to Italy for interment. Since 2006 the Förderverein Gedenkstätte Kriegsgefangenenlager und Sammlung Truppenübungsplatz Altengrabow have been dedicated to researching the history of the site, and raising a memorial to the prisoners of war who died there.

== Notable prisoners ==
- Maurice Chevalier (1914–1917)
- Konstanty Ildefons Gałczyński (c.1940–1945)
- Tadeusz Gebethner (1944)

== See also ==
- List of prisoner-of-war camps in Germany
