= Jerichower Land =

Coordinates: 52°20′N 12°04′E

- District
- Flag Coat of arms
- Country: Germany
- State: Saxony-Anhalt
- Capital: Burg bei Magdeburg

Government
  - District admin.: Steffen Burchhardt (SPD)

Area
  - Total: 1,578.2 km^{2} (609.3 sq mi)

Population (31 December 2024)
  - Total: 88,509
  - Density: 56/km^{2} (150/sq mi)
- Time zone: UTC+01:00 (CET)
  - Summer (DST): UTC+02:00 (CEST)
- Vehicle registration: JL, BRG, GNT
- Website: www.lkjl.de

Jerichower Land (German pronunciation: [ˈjeːʁɪçoːɐ ˈlant], lit. 'Jerichow Land') is a district (Kreis) in the north-east of Saxony-Anhalt, Germany. Its neighbouring administrative units are (clockwise from the south): the districts of Anhalt-Bitterfeld, Salzlandkreis, the city of Magdeburg, the districts of Börde, Stendal, Havelland and Potsdam-Mittelmark in Brandenburg.

== History ==
In 1816, the area of the district became part of the Prussian province of Saxony, and was split administratively into three districts, Jerichow I, Jerichow II and Ziesar. The district of Ziesar was added into Jerichow I in 1826.

After World War II, the districts were rearranged. Some areas of the two districts were added to the neighbouring districts of Havelberg, Rathenow, Brandenburg, Loburg and Zerbst. The two districts were also renamed after their administrative seats, thus Jerichow I became District Burg, and Jerichow II became District Genthin. In 1952, the district of Burg was split into two parts. However, in 1957, the district of Loburg was recombined with the district of Burg.

In 1994, the two districts of Burg and Genthin were merged, and re-adopted the historical name of Jerichow. In 2007, 6 municipalities from the former district of Anhalt-Zerbst (Hobeck, Lohburg, Lübs, Prödel, Rosian and Schweinitz) were added to Jerichower Land District.

The name of the district derives from the city of Jerichow, the name of which is related to that of an early Slavic tribal grouping. It is not related to the name for the city of Jericho in the Middle East.

== Geography ==
The area of the district is 1,578.2 km^{2} (609.3 sq mi). Main water bodies in the district are the rivers Elbe, Ehle, Ihle and Nuthe as well as the Elbe-Havel canal.

== Coat of arms ==
The vertical bars in the left half of the coat of arms symbolize the Elbe-Havel canal, while the crane in the right symbolizes the nature in the district. Cranes are common birds in the district.

== Towns and municipalities ==
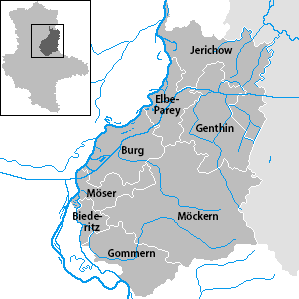
Clickable map of towns and municipalities in the district

The district Jerichower Land consists of the following subdivisions:

Free towns
1. Burg bei Magdeburg
2. Genthin
3. Gommern
4. Jerichow
5. Möckern
Free municipalities
1. Biederitz
2. Elbe-Parey
3. Möser

== Economy ==
The LFD Holding has its headquarters and several production plants in the district.
