= Genthin (Verwaltungsgemeinschaft) =

Municipal association in Saxony-Anhalt, Germany

Coordinates: 52.400°N 12.167°E

Genthin was a Verwaltungsgemeinschaft ("collective municipality") in the Jerichower Land district, in Saxony-Anhalt, Germany. The seat of the Verwaltungsgemeinschaft was in Genthin. It was disbanded in July 2009, when the member municipalities merged to form the new town of Genthin.

The Verwaltungsgemeinschaft Genthin consisted of the following municipalities:

1. Genthin
2. Gladau
3. Paplitz
4. Tucheim
