= Pritzerbe station =

Railway station in Havelsee, Germany

Pritzerbe
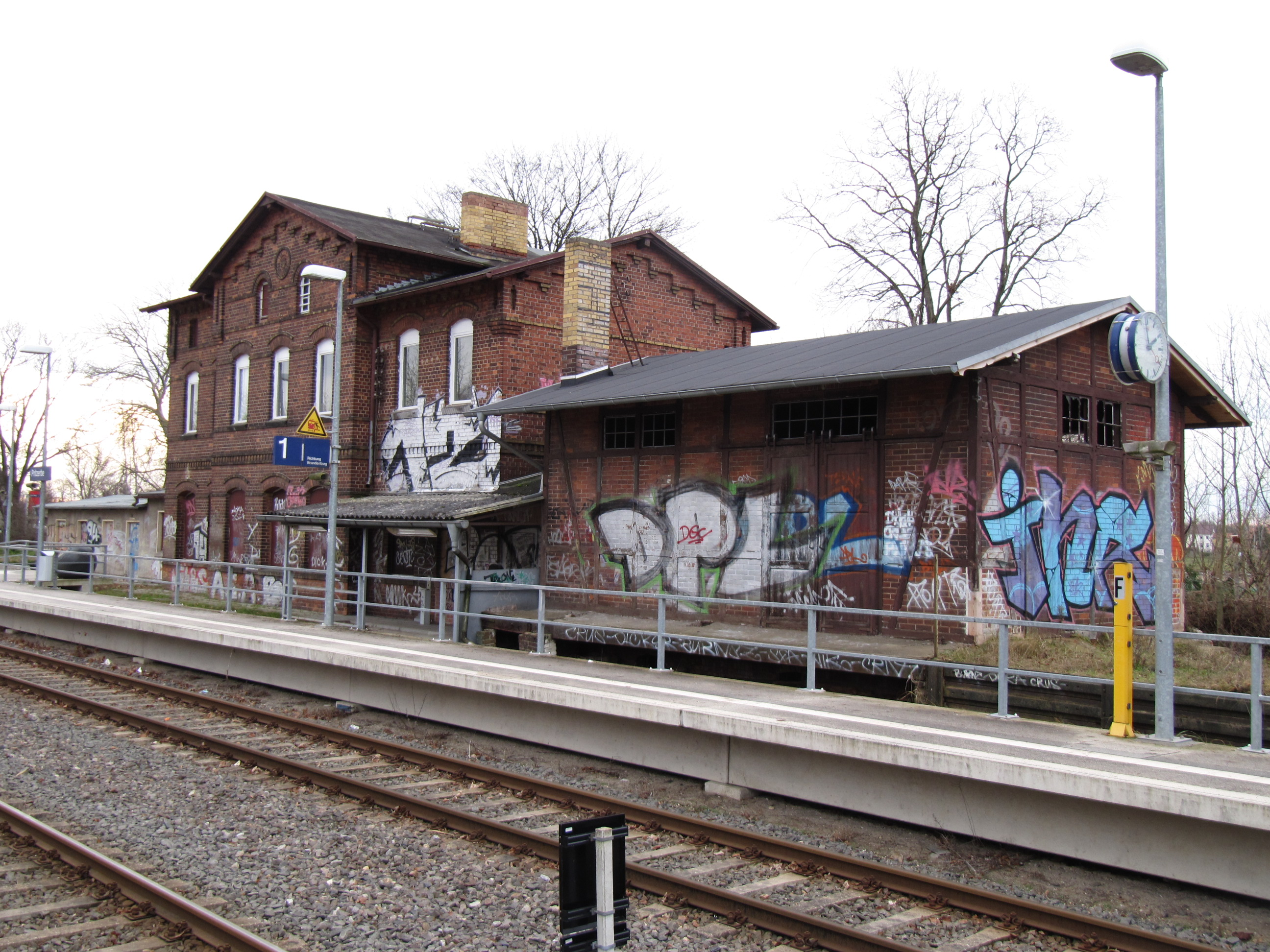
- 2013

General information
- Location: An der Marzahner Chaussee 1; 14798 Pritzerbe; Brandenburg; Germany
- Coordinates: 52.4999°N 12.4584°E
- Owner: Deutsche Bahn
- Operator: DB Station&Service
- Lines: Brandenburg Towns Railway (KBS 209.51)
- Platforms: 2 side platforms
- Tracks: 2
- Train operators: ODEG
- Connections: RB 51; 564

Construction
- Parking: yes
- Cycle facilities: yes
- Accessible: yes

Other information
- Station code: 5042
- DS100 code: LPI
- IBNR: 8012676
- Category: 6
- Fare zone: VBB: Brandenburg adH C/5541
- Website: www.bahnhof.de

Services
Preceding station	Ostdeutsche Eisenbahn	Following station
Döberitz towards Rathenow	RB 51	Fohrde towards Brandenburg Hbf
Location
- Location within Brandenburg Location within Germany Location within Europe

Pritzerbe station (German: Bahnhof Pritzerbe) is a railway station in the municipality of Pritzerbe, located in the Potsdam-Mittelmark district in Brandenburg, Germany.

== Notable places nearby ==
- Pritzerbe Ferry
- Pritzerbe Lake
