= Groß Kreutz station =

Railway station in Groß Kreutz (Havel), Germany

Groß Kreutz
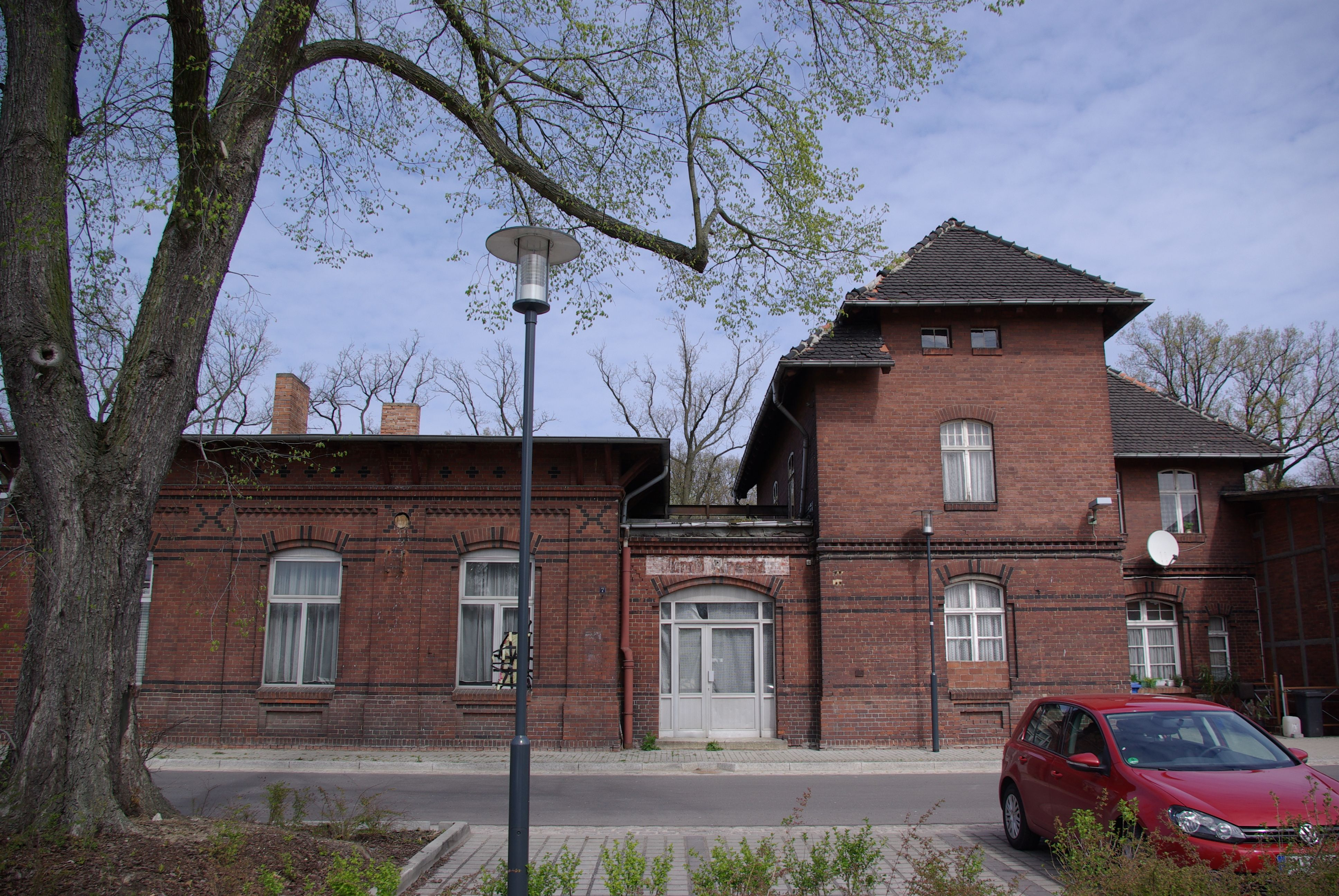
- 2010

General information
- Location: Bahnhofstraße 7; 14550 Groß Kreutz; Brandenburg; Germany
- Coordinates: 52.4108°N 12.7768°E
- Owner: DB Netz
- Operator: DB Station&Service
- Lines: Berlin–Magdeburg railway (KBS 201)
- Platforms: 2 side platforms
- Tracks: 3
- Train operators: Ostdeutsche Eisenbahn

Construction
- Parking: yes
- Cycle facilities: yes
- Accessible: partly

Other information
- Station code: 2307
- DS100 code: LGZ
- IBNR: 8011725
- Category: 6
- Fare zone: VBB: 5746
- Website: www.bahnhof.de

Services
Preceding station	Ostdeutsche Eisenbahn	Following station
Götz towards Brandenburg Hbf	RE 1	Werder (Havel) towards Frankfurt (Oder)
Location
- Location within Brandenburg Location within Germany Location within Europe

Groß Kreutz station is a railway station in the municipality of Groß Kreutz, located in the Potsdam-Mittelmark district in Brandenburg, Germany.
