= LFD Holding =

German pig production company

- Industry: Pig farming
- Predecessor: Straathof Holding GmbH
- Founded: 2004; 21 years ago
- Founder: Adrianus Straathof
- Headquarters: Genthin, Germany
- Area served: Europe
- Key people: René Drews (CEO)
- Products: Piglets
- Revenue: €106.873 million (2020)
- Owner: Terra Grundwerte AG
- Number of employees: 405 (2020)
- Website: lfd-holding.com

The LFD Holding is a German piglet production concern based in Genthin in Saxony-Anhalt. It is Germany's largest piglet producer and market leader.

The company was founded in 2004 by Dutchman Adrianus Straathof as Straathof Holding GmbH. In 2014, it was renamed LFD Holding GmbH (LFD standing for Landwirtschaftliche Ferkelzucht Deutschland). In 2020, the company was sold to the Swiss-based investment and holding company Terra Grundwerte AG.

The company has been repeatedly criticized for animal cruelty. In 2021, a major fire completely destroyed the piglet production plant in Alt Tellin.

== History ==
Adrianus Straathof began raising pigs in the Netherlands in 1973. In 2001, Dutch authorities took legal and police action against the farm due to animal cruelty and overcrowding in the stables. After that, Adrianus Straathof expanded to eastern Germany. At the end of 2004, Adrianus Straathof founded Straathof Holding GmbH based in Gladau as an umbrella organization for his various plants in Germany. The Straathof Holding GmbH also opened plants in Hungary.

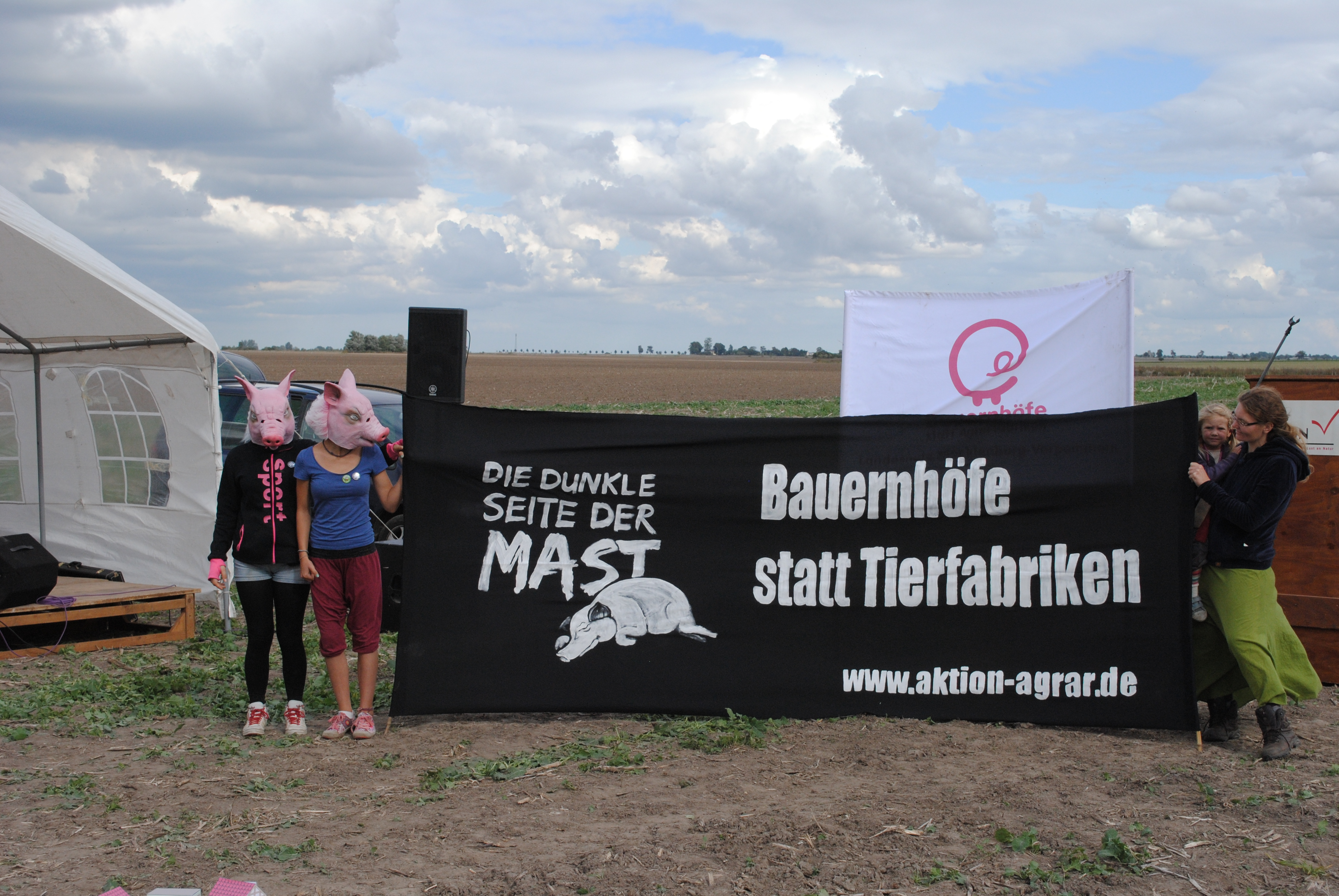
Protest against the piglet production plant in Alt Tellin

The company became a pioneer of large-scale animal husbandry in Germany and one of the largest piglet producers in Europe. In doing so, the company repeatedly violated legal requirements and was legally convicted. At the Gladau plant alone, authorities imposed fines amounting to €2.1 million from 2005 to 2014. Subsequently, the company was subjected to protests from local residents, environmentalists as well as animal rights activists.

After the investigative TV magazine Report Mainz reported on animal cruelty in December 2013 with video recordings by the animal rights organization Animal Rights Watch, a three-day raid by police and the public prosecutor's office took place at the Gladau site in 2014. As a result, in November 2014, the responsible district of Jerichower Land issued a nationwide ban on pig keeping and care against Adrianus Straathof, which was unique on this scale in Germany.

After that, the concern was renamed LFD Holding GmbH on December 22, 2014. Adrianus Straathof initially handed over the management to an employee. Finally, on June 4, 2015, Adrianus Straathof announced that Christian Graf Brockdorff and the law firm Schultze & Braun would act as trustees of his ownership. At the same time, an advisory board was established, of which Adrianus Straathof became a member.

On March 18, 2020, Adrianus Straathof sold the concern to the investor Terra Grundwerte AG, based in Switzerland and owned by Schleuniger founder Thomas-Andreas Martin Strehl. Terra Grundwerte AG in turn appointed the Lindhorst Group based in Winsen an der Aller for the operational management. In fiscal year 2020, revenue amounted to €106.873 million, of which roughly 94% (€100.543 million) were generated in Germany and 6% (€6.33 million) in other European countries.

A major fire on March 31, 2021, completely destroyed the piglet production plant in Alt Tellin, resulting in losses of around 20% in the concern's piglet production capacity. The public prosecutor's office estimated the damage at around €40 million.

== Structure ==
The concern keeps sows and produces piglets. The operation of the individual plants is carried out through 14 subsidiaries. The animal stock in the parent farms is 55,000 sows, with which 4000 piglets are produced per day. The piglets are sold to fattening companies in Germany and Europe, some are fattened in the concern's own fattening plants.

For the trade and transport of the animals, the concern cooperates with the Venneker group. With regard to the genetics of the animals, the concern cooperates with the pig breeding company Hypor, a subsidiary of one of the world's largest animal genetics groups Hendrix Genetics.

== Controversies ==
=== Animal cruelty ===
The company has been repeatedly criticized for animal cruelty. The animal rights organization Animal Rights Watch has published footage from inside the company's stables on several occasions, causing public criticism. Consequently, the company has been subjected to restraints and fines by authorities.

One major criticism concerned the brutal killings of piglets. In December 2013, Report Mainz reported that piglets were systematically beaten to death in plants of the company in a manner that violated animal welfare. Official police evidence videos from 2014 documented piglets being brutally killed in the carcass box. In 2019, Report Mainz as well as Der Spiegel published footage in cooperation with Animal Rights Watch, which again showed brutal killings of pigs. An employee was subsequently fired and the plant manager was issued a warning.

Another major criticism concerned the company keeping sows in gestation crates too narrowly so that the animals had far too little space. The German Federal Administrative Court ruled that the company's practices were illegal and violated animal welfare.

=== Technical deficiencies and operational problems ===
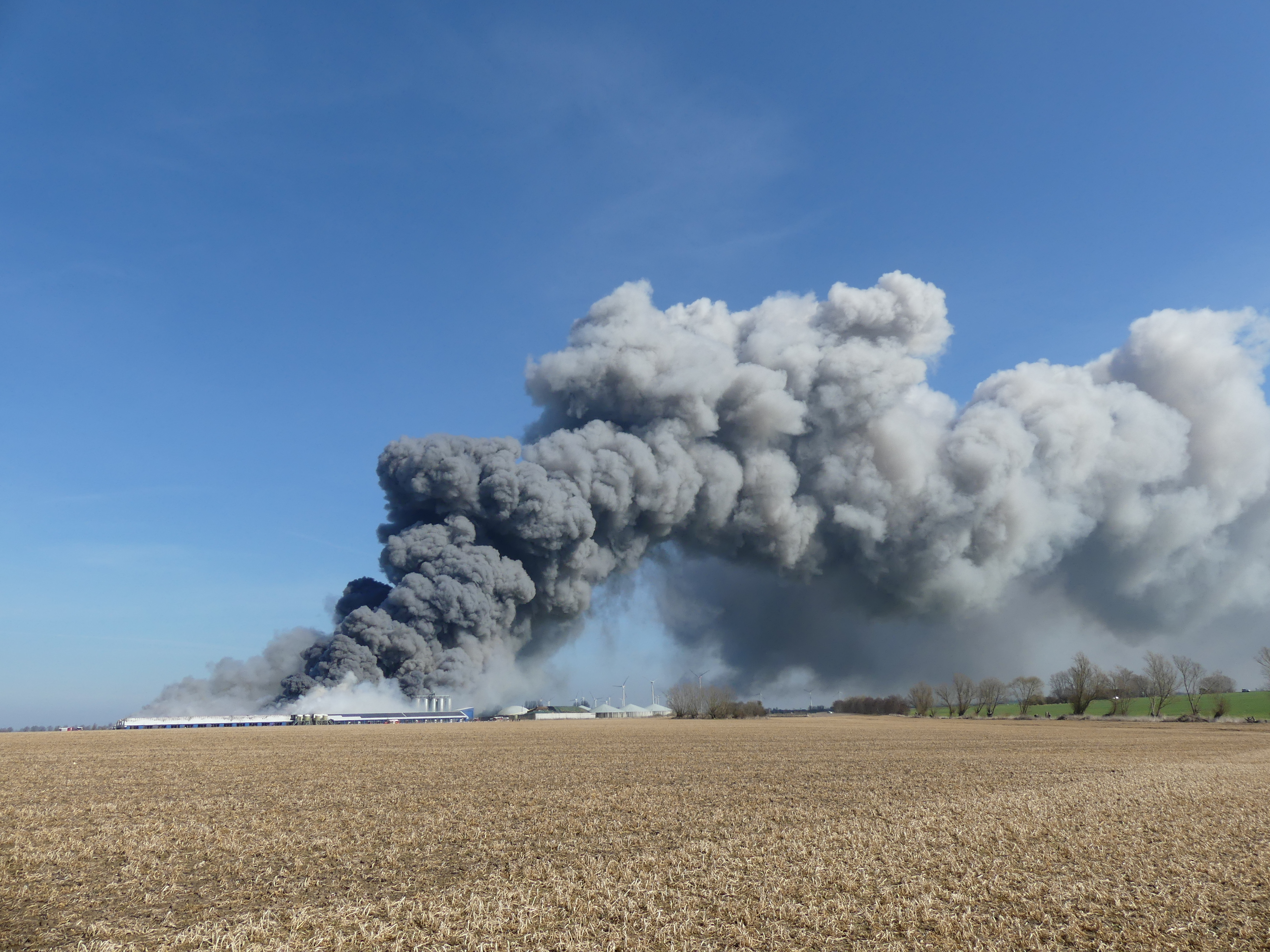
Fire at the piglet production plant in Alt Tellin

In April 2017, a technical failure led to a fire at the piglet production plant in Kleindemsin, the approximately 260 sows housed there died and damages of €2 to 2.5 million were incurred.

In July 2018, a technical defect led to a fire at the piglet production plant in Gladau, the resulting damage was estimated at €250,000.

In August 2019, there was a leak of high-percentage sulfuric acid at the piglet production plant in Alt Tellin. Later the same month, more than 1,000 piglets died in Alt Tellin due to the failure of a ventilation system. In March 2021, a major fire finally destroyed the entire piglet production plant in Alt Tellin consisting of 18 stables, only 1300 of the 51.000 penned sows and piglets survived. The company was accused of having accepted the death of the animals in case of fire and of not having taken sufficient fire precautions.
