= Werder (Havel) station =

Railway station in Werder/Havel, Germany

Werder (Havel)
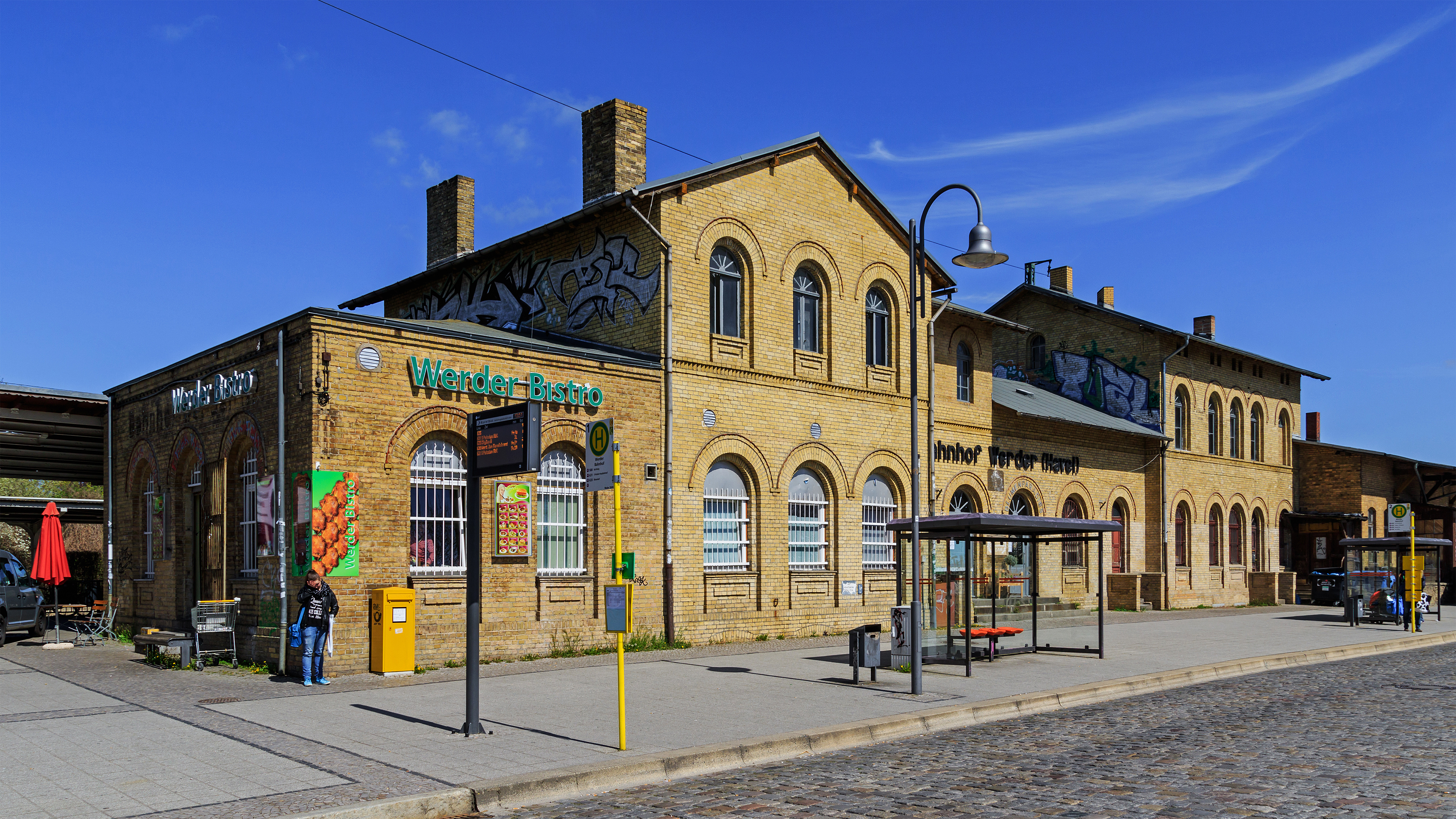
- 2016

General information
- Location: Eisenbahnstraße 107; 14542 Werder (Havel); Brandenburg; Germany
- Coordinates: 52.3928°N 12.9262°E
- Owner: DB Netz
- Operator: DB Station&Service
- Lines: Berlin–Magdeburg railway (KBS 201)
- Platforms: 1 island platform 1 side platform
- Tracks: 4
- Train operators: Ostdeutsche Eisenbahn

Construction
- Parking: yes
- Cycle facilities: yes
- Accessible: yes

Other information
- Station code: 6681
- DS100 code: BWE
- IBNR: 8010373
- Category: 4
- Fare zone: VBB: Berlin C and Potsdam C/5848
- Website: www.bahnhof.de

Services
Preceding station	Ostdeutsche Eisenbahn	Following station
Groß Kreutz towards Brandenburg Hbf	RE 1	Potsdam Park Sanssouci towards Frankfurt (Oder)
Brandenburg Hbf towards Magdeburg Hbf	RE 1	Potsdam Hbf towards Cottbus Hbf
Location
- Location within Brandenburg Location within Germany Location within Europe

Werder (Havel) station is a railway station in Werder (Havel), Brandenburg, Germany.
