= Götz station =

Railway station in Groß Kreutz (Havel), Germany

Götz
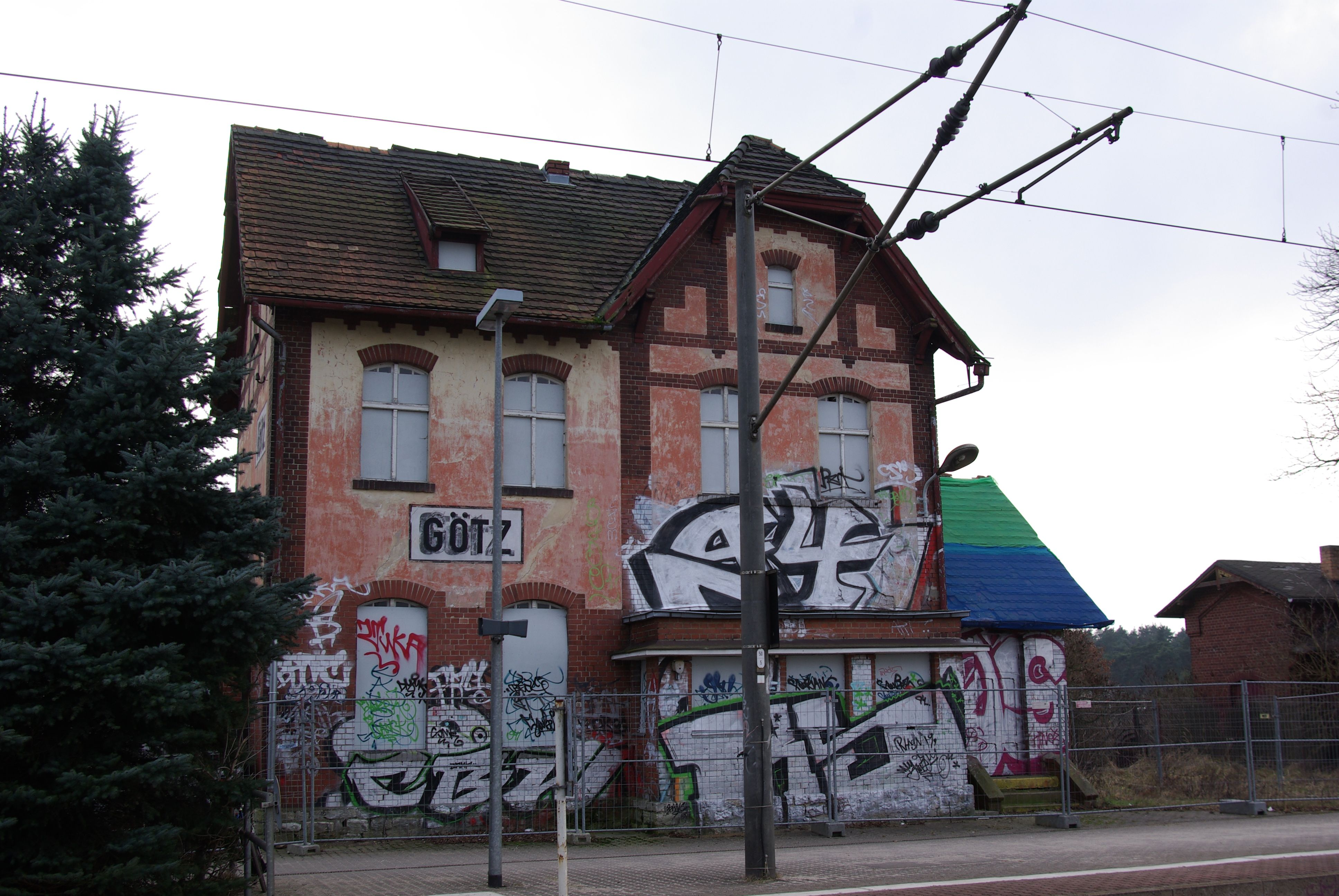
- 2009

General information
- Location: Zum Bahnhof 1; 14550 Götz; Brandenburg; Germany
- Coordinates: 52.4110°N 12.7267°E
- Owner: DB Netz
- Operator: DB Station&Service
- Lines: Berlin–Magdeburg railway (KBS 201)
- Platforms: 2 side platforms
- Tracks: 2
- Train operators: Ostdeutsche Eisenbahn

Construction
- Parking: yes
- Cycle facilities: yes
- Accessible: yes

Other information
- Station code: 2220
- DS100 code: LGOE
- IBNR: 8011662
- Category: 6
- Fare zone: VBB: Brandenburg adH C/5745
- Website: www.bahnhof.de

Services
Preceding station	Ostdeutsche Eisenbahn	Following station
Brandenburg Hbf Terminus	RE 1	Groß Kreutz towards Frankfurt (Oder)
Location
- Location within Brandenburg Location within Germany Location within Europe

Götz station is a railway station in the village of Götz, in the municipality of Groß Kreutz, located in the Potsdam-Mittelmark district in Brandenburg, Germany.
