= Genthin station =

Railway station in Genthin, Germany

Genthin
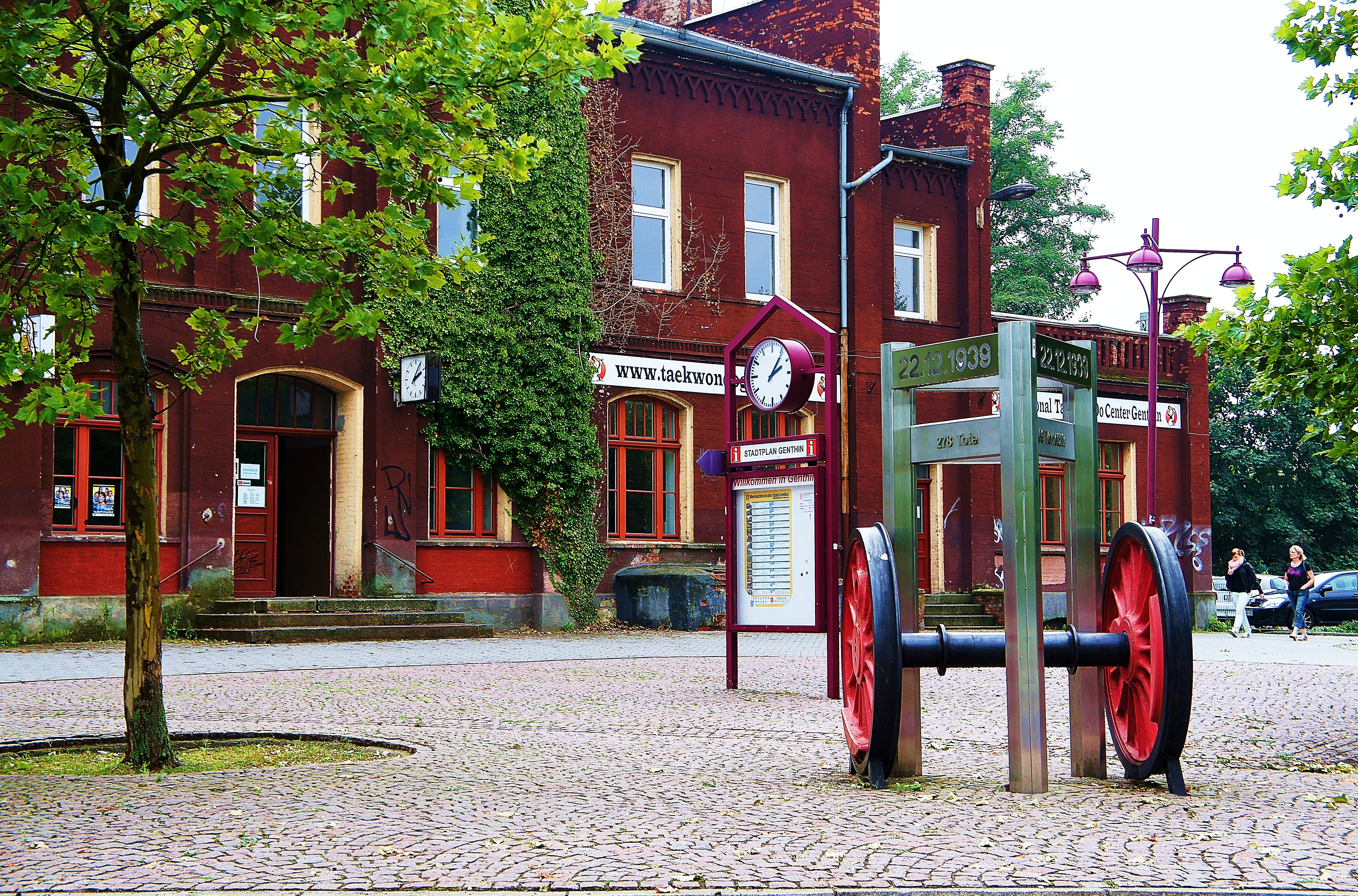
- 2012

General information
- Location: Schwarzer Weg 2; 39307 Genthin; Saxony-Anhalt; Germany
- Coordinates: 52.4033°N 12.1567°E
- Elevation: 35 m (115 ft)
- Owner: DB Netz
- Operator: DB Station&Service
- Lines: Berlin–Magdeburg railway (KBS 201); Genthin–Schönhausen railway (KBS 264); Genthin Light Railway
- Platforms: 1 island platform 1 side platform
- Tracks: 4
- Train operators: Ostdeutsche Eisenbahn

Construction
- Parking: yes
- Cycle facilities: yes
- Accessible: yes

Other information
- Station code: 2066
- DS100 code: LGN
- IBNR: 8010123
- Category: 4
- Fare zone: marego: 430
- Website: www.bahnhof.de

Services
Preceding station	Ostdeutsche Eisenbahn	Following station
Güsen (b Genthin) towards Magdeburg Hbf	RE 1	Wusterwitz towards Cottbus Hbf
Location
- Location within Saxony-Anhalt Location within Germany Location within Europe

Genthin station is a railway station in the municipality of Genthin, located in the Jerichower Land district in Saxony-Anhalt, Germany.
