= Alt Tellin =

- Municipality
- Location of Alt Tellin within Vorpommern-Greifswald district
- Interactive map of Alt Tellin
- Location within Germany Location within Mecklenburg-Vorpommern
- Coordinates: 53°51′N 13°15′E
- Country: Germany
- State: Mecklenburg-Vorpommern
- District: Vorpommern-Greifswald
- Municipal assoc.: Jarmen-Tutow
- Subdivisions: 7 Ortsteile

Government
  - Mayor: Frank Karstädt

Area
  - Total: 24.32 km^{2} (9.39 sq mi)
- Elevation: 12 m (39 ft)

Population (2025-12-31)
  - Total: 354
  - Density: 14.6/km^{2} (37.7/sq mi)
- Time zone: UTC+01:00 (CET)
  - Summer (DST): UTC+02:00 (CEST)
- Postal codes: 17129
- Dialling codes: 039991
- Vehicle registration: DM
- Website: www.amt-jarmen-tutow.de

Alt Tellin is a municipality in the Vorpommern-Greifswald district, in Mecklenburg-Vorpommern, Germany.

== History ==
From 1648 to 1720, Alt Tellin was part of Swedish Pomerania. From 1720 to 1945, it was part of the Prussian Province of Pomerania, from 1945 to 1952 of the State of Mecklenburg-Vorpommern, from 1952 to 1990 of the Bezirk Neubrandenburg and since 1990 again of Mecklenburg-Vorpommern.

Originally named Siedenbüssow, the region has long been associated with the porcine trade. The region is primarily characterized by farms. Its name was changed to Alt Tellin on January 1, 1951. The word "Bussow" derives from Burgh, meaning "hill."

On March 31, 2021, a major fire destroyed the piglet production plant of LFD Holding in Alt Tellin consisting of 18 stables. Only 1300 of the 51.000 penned sows and piglets survived, the damage was estimated at €40 million.
