= Brandenburg Hauptbahnhof =

Railway station in Brandenburg an der Havel, Germany

Brandenburg Hbf
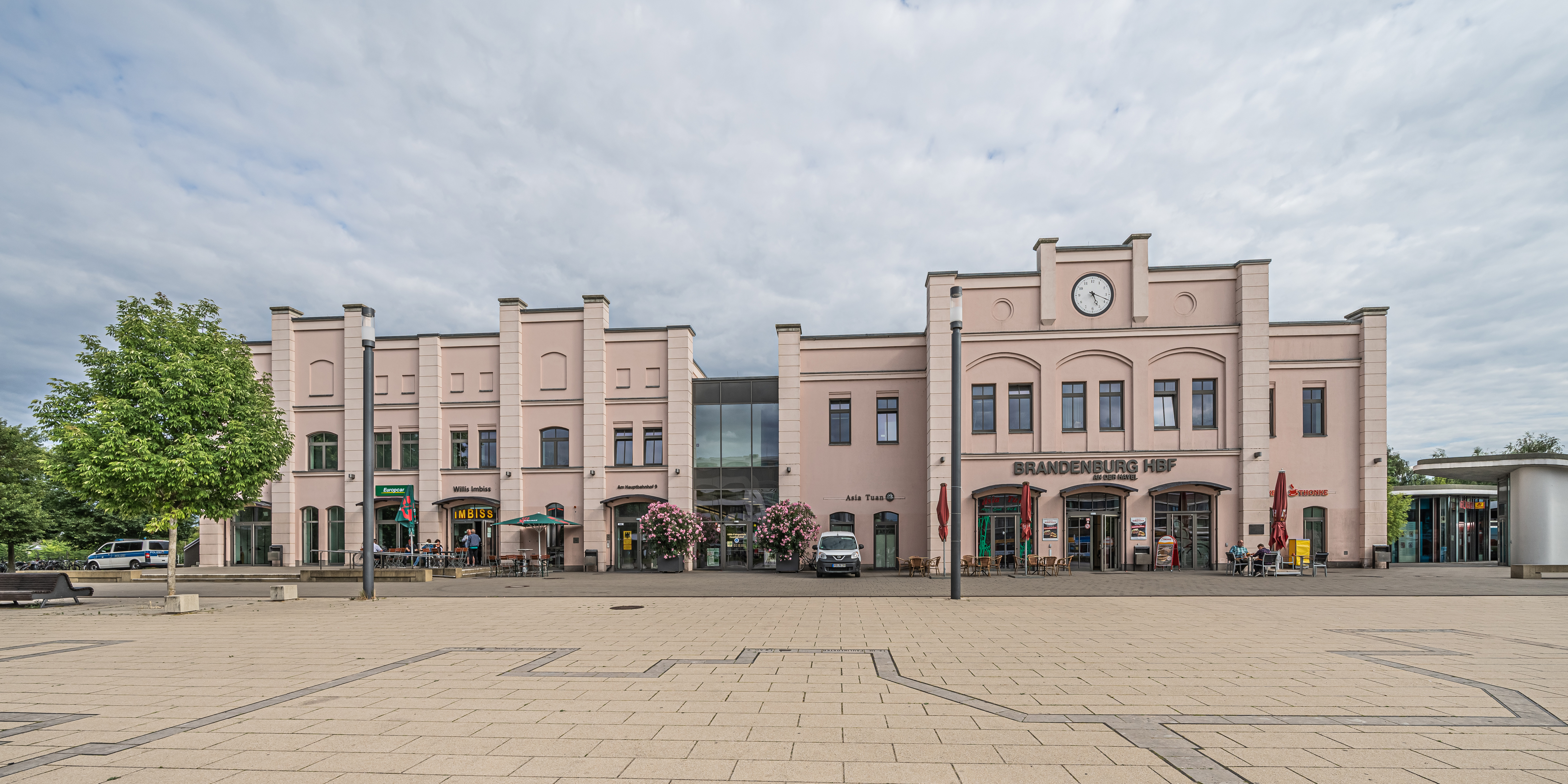
- Station building from the street

General information
- Location: Am Hauptbahnhof 9, Brandenburg, Brandenburg; Germany
- Coordinates: 52°24′3″N 12°33′59″E
- Lines: Berlin–Magdeburg (KBS 201); Brandenburg Towns Railway (KBS 209.51)
- Platforms: 6

Construction
- Accessible: Yes

Other information
- Station code: 823
- DS100 code: LB
- IBNR: 8010060
- Category: 3
- Fare zone: VBB: Brandenburg adH A/5742
- Website: www.bahnhof.de

History
- Opened: 1846; 180 years ago

Services
Preceding station	DB Fernverkehr	Following station
Magdeburg Hbf towards Köln Hbf	ICE 10	Potsdam Hbf towards Berlin Ostbahnhof
Magdeburg Hbf towards Leipzig Hbf	IC 17	Potsdam Hbf towards Ostseebad Binz
Magdeburg Hbf towards Norddeich Mole	IC 56	Potsdam Hbf towards Cottbus Hbf or Bergen auf Rügen
Preceding station	Ostdeutsche Eisenbahn	Following station
Terminus	RE 1	Götz towards Frankfurt (Oder)
Kirchmöser towards Magdeburg Hbf	RE 1	Werder (Havel) towards Cottbus Hbf
Brandenburg Altstadt towards Rathenow	RB 51	Terminus
Preceding station	Abellio Rail Mitteldeutschland	Following station
Genthin towards Thale Hbf	Harz-Berlin-Express	Potsdam Hbf towards Berlin Ostbahnhof
Location

Brandenburg Hauptbahnhof is the main railway station in the town of Brandenburg an der Havel in the German state of Brandenburg. It lies on the Berlin–Magdeburg railway at the junction with the Brandenburg Towns Railway. It has largely lost its former major role for long-distance passenger services and freight traffic, but it continues to serve regional traffic. A water tower on the site of the former freight yard and a plaque commemorating French forced labourers at the station buildings are heritage-listed. The station was renamed Brandenburg Hauptbahnhof at the end of World War II, previously it had been called Brandenburg Rb (Rb for Deutsche Reichsbahn) station. It is classified by Deutsche Bahn as a category 3 station.

== Location ==
The station is located at the kilometre 61.3 point of the Berlin–Magdeburg railway (calculated from the former Berlin Potsdamer Bahnhof), which runs in an approximately east–west direction. The route of the Brandenburg Towns Railway (German: Brandenburgischen Städtebahn) crossed the main line west of the station and was connected by a curve to the station. The station is located south of central Brandenburg.

== History ==
Brandenburg was opened in 1846 with the opening of the Berlin–Potsdam–Magdeburg railway on 7 August 1846. The Brandenburg Towns Railway from Treuenbrietzen via Brandenburg to Neustadt (Dosse) went into operation in 1904. Today, only the section between Brandenburg and Rathenow is still in use. The Brandenburg Towns Railway had its own station called Brandenburg Neustadt (Brandenburg new town) next to the main station and it later became part of the main station. The West Havelland District Railway (Westhavelländische Kreisbahnen) line (opened in 1901 and closed in the 1960s) did not reach the main station. The terminus of the route in the city of Brandenburg was at the Krakauer Tor (Kraków Gate) station in the north-east of the town, a branch line ran to Brandenburg-Altstadt (Brandenburg old town) station on the Brandenburg Towns Railway.

The line from Berlin to Magdeburg through Brandenburg station was electrified in 1995.

=== Train services ===
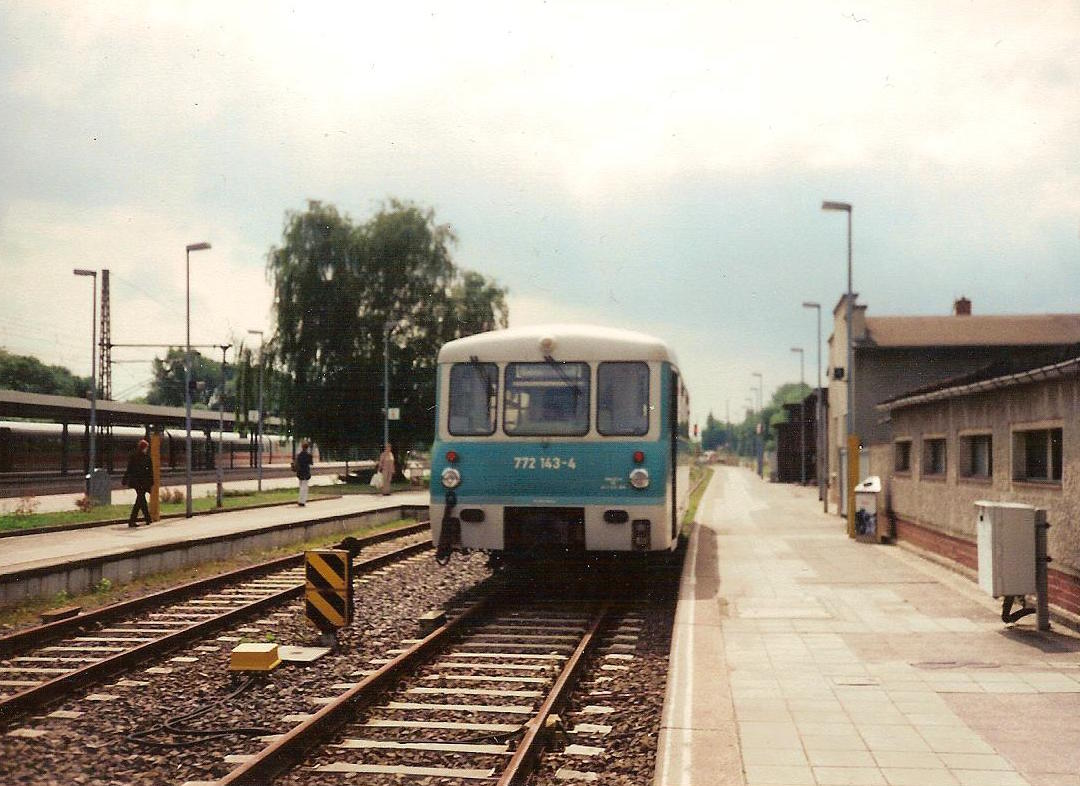
Passenger train in the station on the now disused line to Belzig

Brandenburg was formerly a stop for long-distance trains, many of which ran from Berlin via Magdeburg and continued to western and southern Germany. Traffic flows changed with the division of Germany after 1945 and the construction of the Berlin Wall in 1961. Long-distance trains between Berlin and Magdeburg, sometimes continuing to Halberstadt, served the station, including an interzonal train from Görlitz to Cologne. There were also a number of regional services from Brandenburg towards Potsdam. Some services, popularly known as Sputnik trains, ran from Berlin over the Berlin outer ring via Potsdam to Brandenburg. The transit trains from West Berlin to West Germany also ran through Brandenburg, although they did not stop anywhere in East Germany.

After the fall of the Berlin Wall, trains to western and southern Germany began to stop in Brandenburg again. International trains, including night trains to Paris and Amsterdam, served the station. After electrification in 1995, some Intercity-Express (ICE) trains called at the station. With the commissioning of the Hanover–Berlin high-speed railway, long-distance passenger services shifted predominantly to that line and no longer went through Brandenburg. In the early years there were still some ICE trains through Brandenburg and Magdeburg, but they were soon discontinued.

Regional services were gradually placed on a regular interval basis in the mid-1990s and services on the main line and towards Rathenow became hourly, with up to two trains per hour running to/from towards Berlin.

In the timetable for 2016, in addition to two pairs of long-distance services, local services stop in Brandenburg, which is located in the area of the Verkehrsverbund Berlin-Brandenburg. The ICE service has stopped in Brandenburg since the timetable change 2015/16. It only operates at night from Sunday to Monday.

Line	Route		Operator
ICE 10	Cologne – Düsseldorf – Düsseldorf Airport – Duisburg – Essen – Dortmund – Hanover – Braunschweig – Magdeburg – Brandenburg – Potsdam – Berlin Hbf – Berlin Ostbahnhof		DB Fernverkehr
IC 56	Norddeich Mole / Emden Außenhafen – Oldenburg – Bremen – Magdeburg – Brandenburg – Berlin –	Berlin-Ostbahnhof – Cottbus	DB Fernverkehr
IC 56	Norddeich Mole / Emden Außenhafen – Oldenburg – Bremen – Magdeburg – Brandenburg – Berlin –	Rostock – (Bergen auf Rügen)	DB Fernverkehr
HBX	Berlin Ostbahnhof – Potsdam – Brandenburg – Genthin – Magdeburg – Halberstadt – Thale		Abellio
RE 1	Magdeburg – Brandenburg – Potsdam – Berlin – Fürstenwalde (Spree) – Frankfurt (Oder) – Eisenhüttenstadt – Cottbus		Ostdeutsche Eisenbahn
RB 51	Brandenburg – Brandenburg-Altstadt – Pritzerbe – Rathenow		Ostdeutsche Eisenbahn

The RE 1 service runs every hour between Brandenburg and Magdeburg and continues approximately every half hour to Berlin and Frankfurt. Additional services run in the peak hour to and from Berlin. The RB 51 service to Rathenow runs every hour.

== Infrastructure ==
The station has a main platform and two more island platforms on the through tracks of the main line. The outermost track and the adjoining sidings have been dismantled so that the southern island platforms has become an outside platform. The platforms are connected with one another and with the station forecourt on the north side of the tracks by a tunnel, although there is no direct access from the south.

The station building is located north of the line. To the west, there are two terminal platforms for the Brandenburg Towns Railway.

In the western part of the station are connecting tracks for traffic to/from the Brandenburg Towns Railway. In the eastern part of the station is the precinct of the freight yard, which is no longer used today. Much of the volume of freight from the town is handled at Brandenburg Altstadt station on the Brandenburg Towns Railway.

The station's DS-100 code is LB and its station code is 823.

== See also ==
- List of railway stations in Brandenburg
- Rail transport in Germany
