= Weißes Fenn Marzahne =

Lake and wetland in Germany

Coordinates: 52°31′29″N 12°31′49″E

The Weißes Fenn Marzahne is a lake, a boggy wetland and a natural monument area in the county of Potsdam-Mittelmark, in the borough of Havelsee north of the village of Marzahne in the Seelensdorf Forest and Marzahn Heath.

== History ==
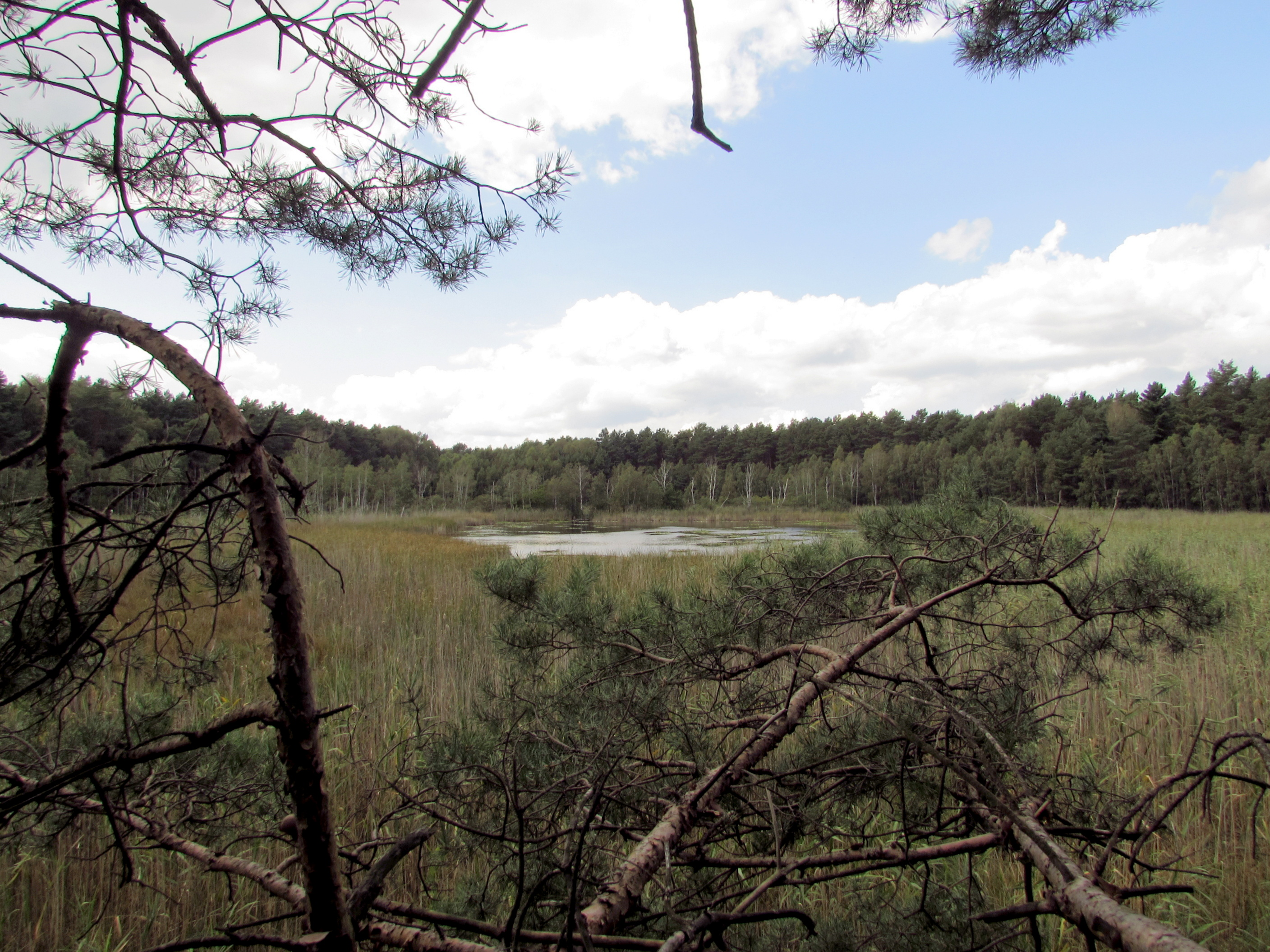
The Weißes Fenn Marzahne

The Weißes Fenn Marzahne was formed after the last cold period, the Weichselian Glaciation. Advancing ice masses pushed a series of tunnel valley basins similar to the parallel Beetzsee-Riewendsee- or Bohnenland-Görden glacial valley, in which meltwaters flowed or collected. These ran from northeast to southwest in the direction of the advancing ice. In this series of tunnel valleys, lakes were subsequently formed, like the Pritzerber See in the southwest. Later low lines of dunes crossed the valley bottoms and they still do today in the northeast of the row of tunnel valleys. These lines of dunes formed a barrier for the Weißes Fenn ("White Fen") to the southwest, so that water could no longer drain in that direction and a boggy wetland was created. In the modern period, a ditch, the Roter Graben, was cut to drain the wetland and the lake. This empties into the Pritzerber See. The Weißes Fenn Marzahne with the Marzahner Fenn, an ice age glacial tongue basin which lies about 2 kilometres to the southeast.

== Protected areas ==
The Weißes Fenn Marzahne was placed in its entirety under protection as an area natural monument. It is also part of the Special Area of Conservation known as the Weißes Fenn und Dünenheide, to which parts of the Marzahner Fenn Nature reserve and Dünenheide belong. In addition it is part of the protected landscape and nature park of Westhavelland.
