= Havelsee =

- Town
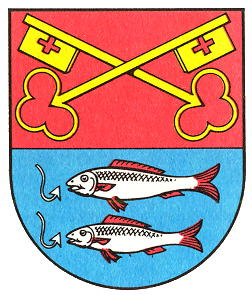
- Coat of arms

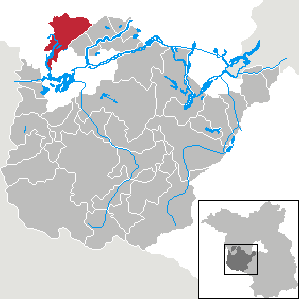
- Location of Havelsee within Potsdam-Mittelmark district
- Interactive map of Havelsee
- Location within Germany Location within Brandenburg
- Coordinates: 52°30′N 12°28′E
- Country: Germany
- State: Brandenburg
- District: Potsdam-Mittelmark
- Municipal assoc.: Beetzsee
- Subdivisions: 8 Ortsteile

Government
  - Mayor (2024–29): Günter Noack (Ind.)

Area
  - Total: 81.97 km^{2} (31.65 sq mi)
- Elevation: 39 m (128 ft)

Population (2025-12-31)
  - Total: 3,126
  - Density: 38.14/km^{2} (98.77/sq mi)
- Time zone: UTC+01:00 (CET)
  - Summer (DST): UTC+02:00 (CEST)
- Postal codes: 14778, 14798
- Dialling codes: 033834
- Vehicle registration: PM
- Website: www.havelsee.de

Havelsee (German pronunciation: [ˈhaːfl̩ˌzeː]) is a town in the Potsdam-Mittelmark district, in Brandenburg, Germany. It is situated on the river Havel, 12 km northwest of Brandenburg.

The Pritzerbe Ferry, a vehicular cable ferry, crosses the Havel between Havelsee and Kützkow.

== Mayor ==
The mayor of Havelsee since 2003 is Günther Noack, he was reelected in 2014 with 83,4 % of the votes.

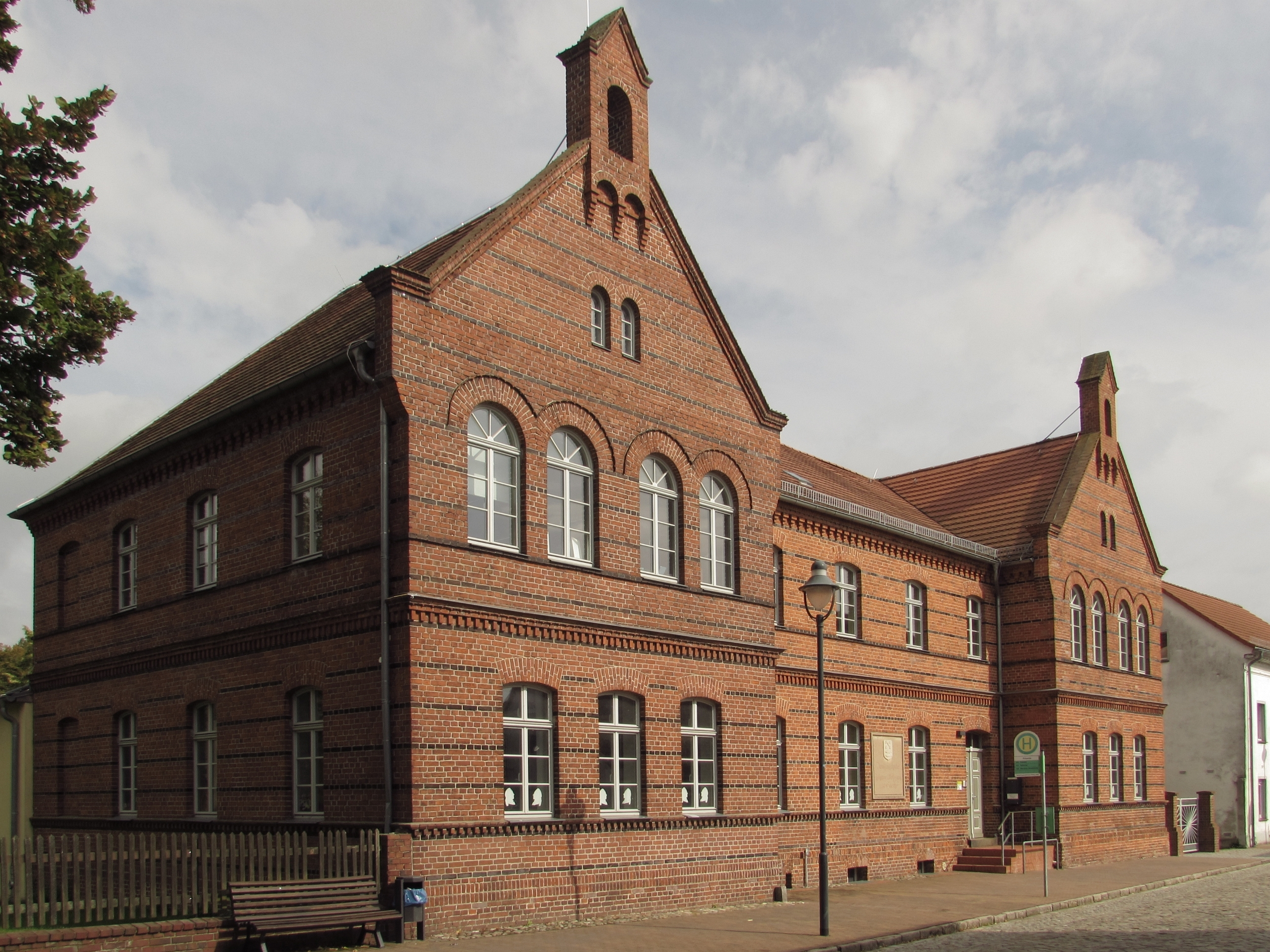
School house in Pritzerbe

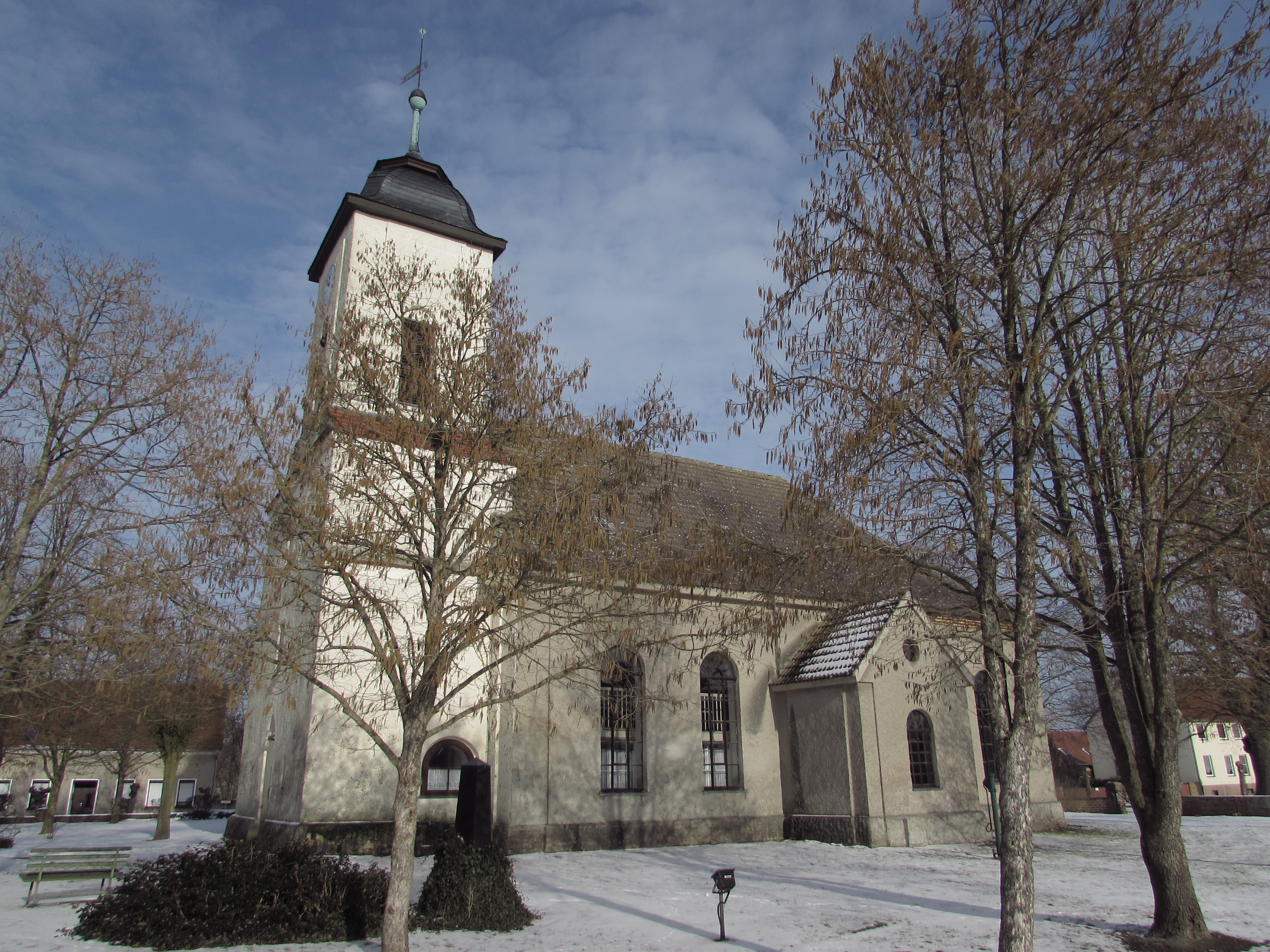
Church in Kirchefohrde

== Protected areas ==
Over 80% of the area of the borough of Havelsee is covered by overlapping protected areas of various types. These include the natural monument of Weißes Fenn Marzahne as well as 3 nature reserves and 4 SACs.

== Notable people ==
- Lothar Kreyssig (1898-1986), magistrate in Brandenburg an der Havel, a member of the Confessing Church, euthanasia opponents and founder of Action Reconciliation Service for Peace, 1937-1971 residing in the Bruderhof at Hohenferchesar
- Walter Kuntze (1883-1960), General of the Wehrmacht

== Demography ==
Development of population since 1875 within the current Boundaries (Blue Line: Population; Dotted Line: Comparison to Population development in Brandenburg state; Grey Background: Time of Nazi Germany; Red Background: Time of communist East Germany)

Havelsee: Population development
within the current boundaries (2013)

Year	Pop.	±% p.a.
1875	4,164	—
1890	4,351	+0.29%
1910	3,992	−0.43%
1925	3,857	−0.23%
1933	3,960	+0.33%
1939	4,419	+1.84%
1946	5,117	+2.12%
1950	5,093	−0.12%
1964	3,953	−1.79%
1971	3,770	−0.67%
1981	3,170	−1.72%
1985	3,076	−0.75%
1989	2,923	−1.27%
1990	2,858	−2.22%
1991	2,775	−2.90%
1992	2,774	−0.04%
1993	2,810	+1.30%
1994	2,907	+3.45%
1995	3,125	+7.50%
1996	3,392	+8.54%

Year	Pop.	±% p.a.
1997	3,546	+4.54%
1998	3,670	+3.50%
1999	3,709	+1.06%
2000	3,737	+0.75%
2001	3,712	−0.67%
2002	3,681	−0.84%
2003	3,613	−1.85%
2004	3,562	−1.41%
2005	3,523	−1.09%
2006	3,516	−0.20%
2007	3,490	−0.74%
2008	3,512	+0.63%
2009	3,493	−0.54%
2010	3,503	+0.29%
2011	3,431	−2.06%
2012	3,349	−2.39%
2013	3,275	−2.21%
2014	3,268	−0.21%
2015	3,234	−1.04%
2016	3,244	+0.31%
