= Tucheim =

- Stadtteil of Genthin
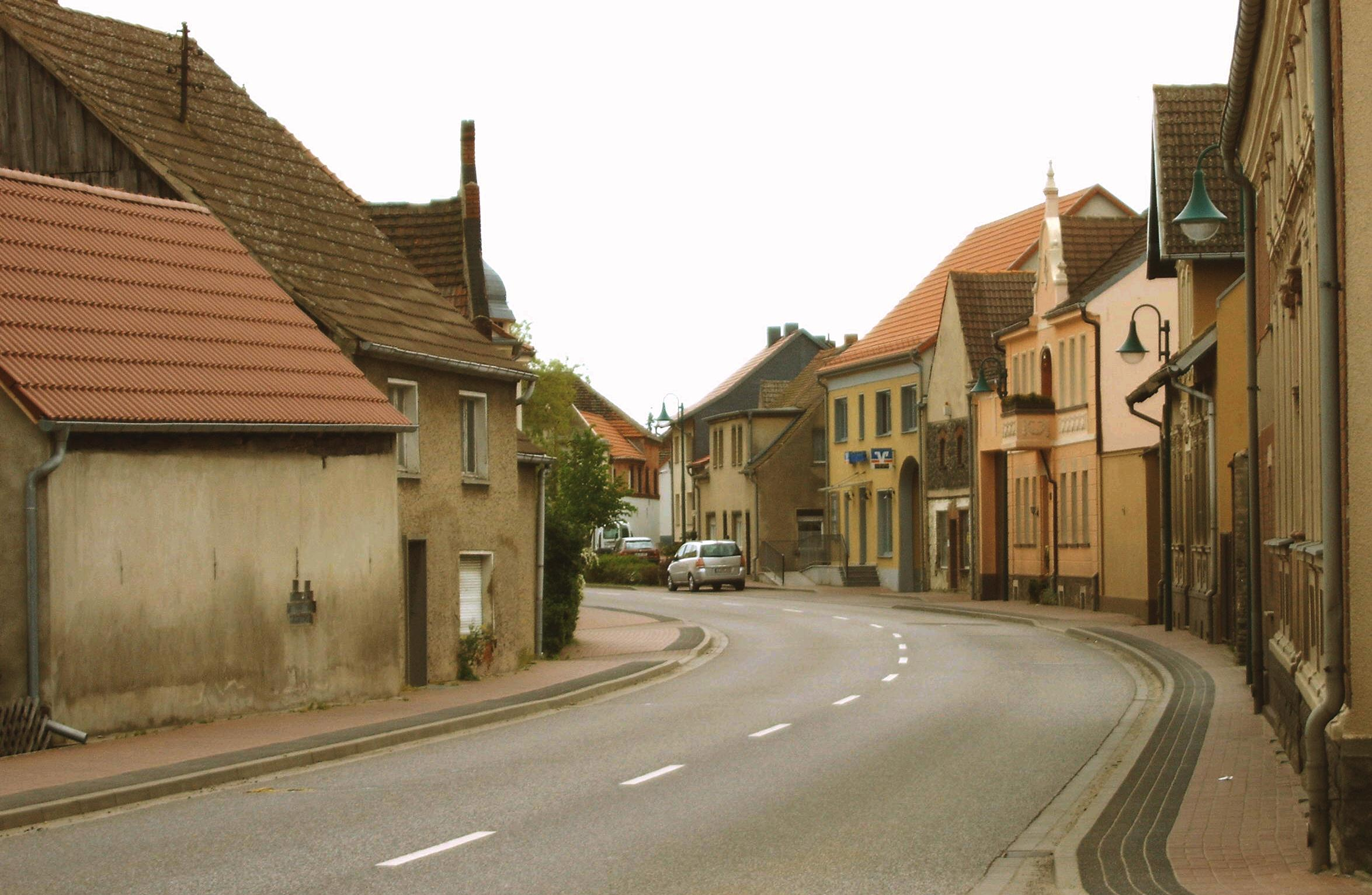
- Main street

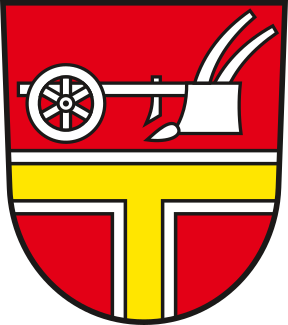
- Coat of arms
- Interactive map of Tucheim
- Location within Germany Location within Saxony-Anhalt
- Coordinates: 52°19′N 12°11′E
- Country: Germany
- State: Saxony-Anhalt
- District: Jerichower Land
- Town: Genthin

Area
  - Total: 54.05 km^{2} (20.87 sq mi)
- Elevation: 36 m (118 ft)

Population (2006-12-31)
  - Total: 1,377
  - Density: 25.48/km^{2} (65.98/sq mi)
- Time zone: UTC+01:00 (CET)
  - Summer (DST): UTC+02:00 (CEST)
- Postal codes: 39307
- Dialling codes: 039346
- Website: www.tucheim.de

Tucheim is a village and a former municipality in the Jerichower Land district, in Saxony-Anhalt, Germany. Since 1 July 2009, it is part of the town Genthin.
