= Pritzerbe Ferry =

Coordinates: 52.494213°N 12.452595°E

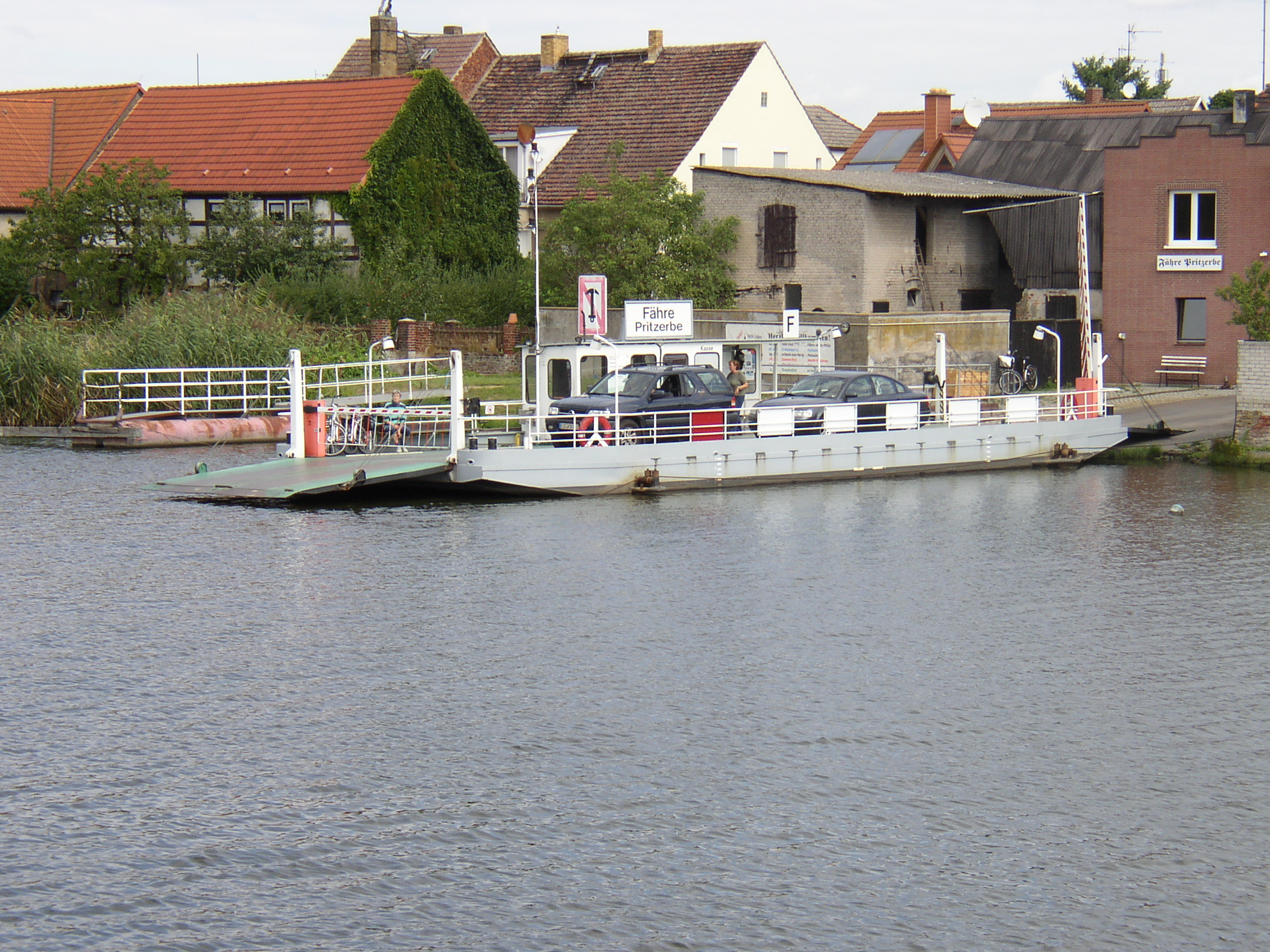
The Pritzerbe Ferry

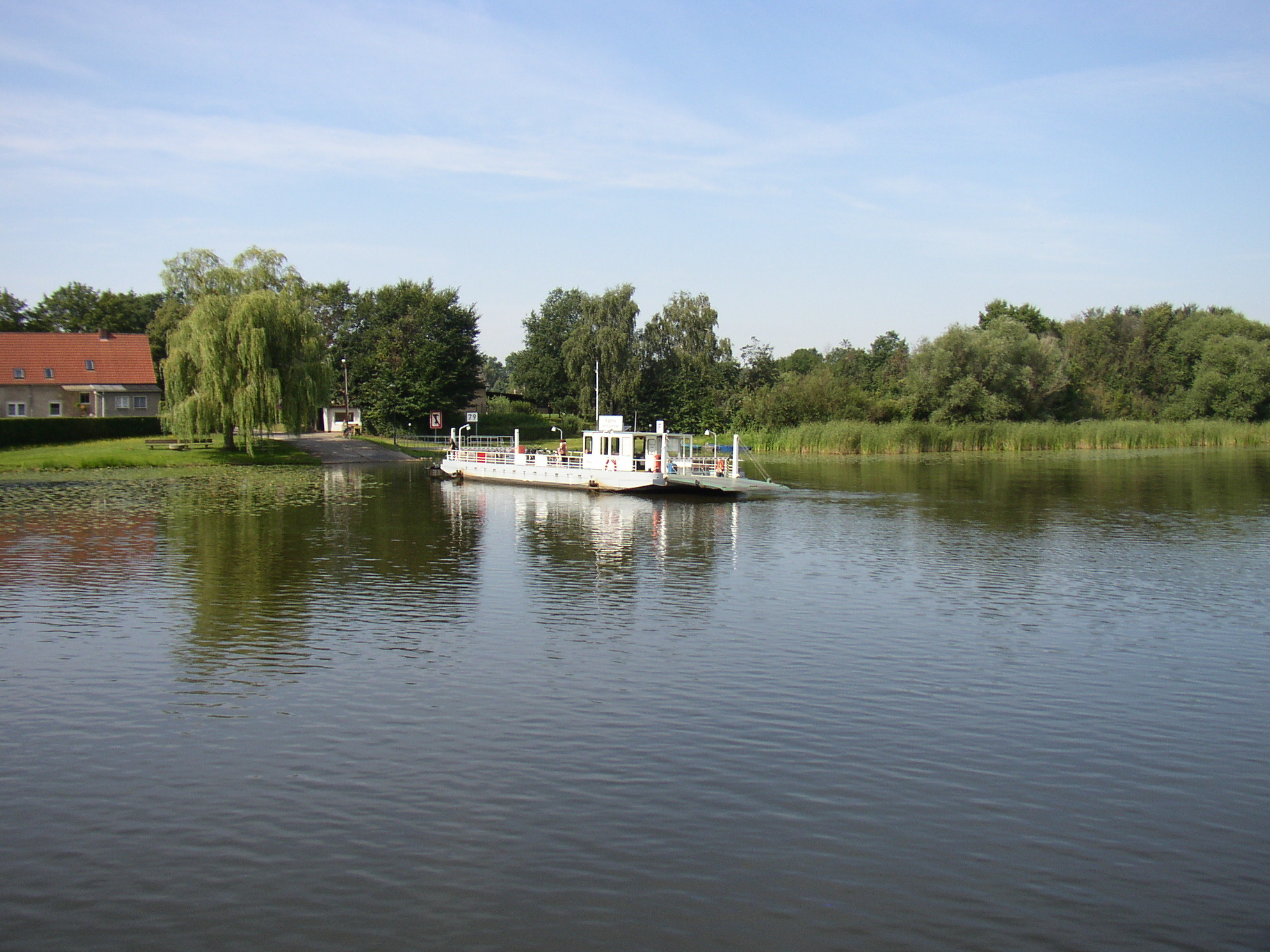
The Pritzerbe Ferry

The Pritzerbe Ferry is a vehicular cable ferry that crosses the Havel River between Pritzerbe and Kützkow (Districts of Havelsee), both located in Brandenburg, Germany.
