= Paplitz (Genthin) =

- Stadtteil of Genthin
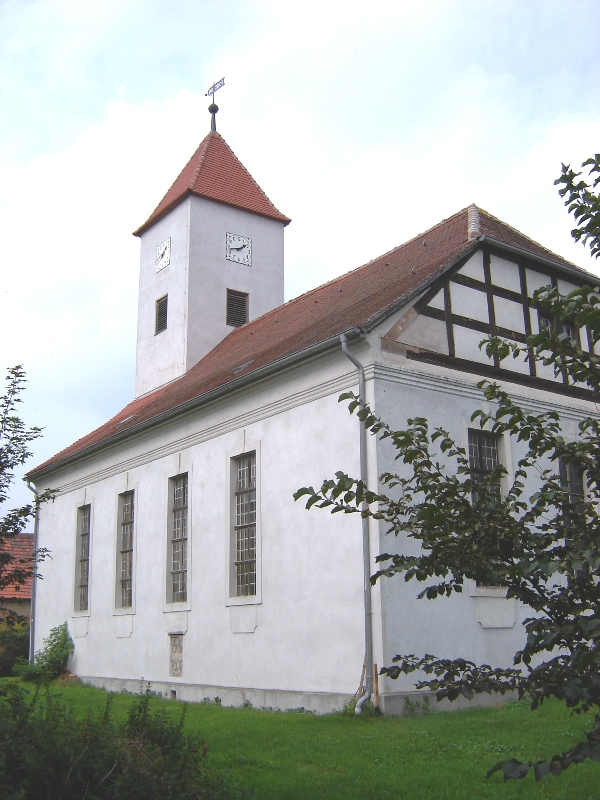
- Church

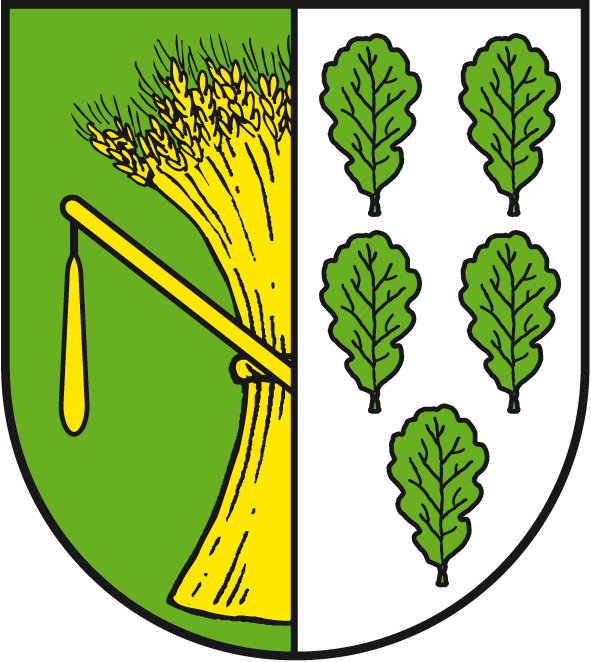
- Coat of arms
- Interactive map of Paplitz
- Location within Germany Location within Saxony-Anhalt
- Coordinates: 52°17′N 12°14′E
- Country: Germany
- State: Saxony-Anhalt
- District: Jerichower Land
- Town: Genthin

Area
  - Total: 27.12 km^{2} (10.47 sq mi)
- Elevation: 51 m (167 ft)

Population (2006-12-31)
  - Total: 363
  - Density: 13.4/km^{2} (34.7/sq mi)
- Time zone: UTC+01:00 (CET)
  - Summer (DST): UTC+02:00 (CEST)
- Postal codes: 39307
- Dialling codes: 039346

Paplitz is a village and a former municipality in the Jerichower Land district, in Saxony-Anhalt, Germany. Since 1 July 2009, it is part of the town Genthin.
