= Genthin =

- Town
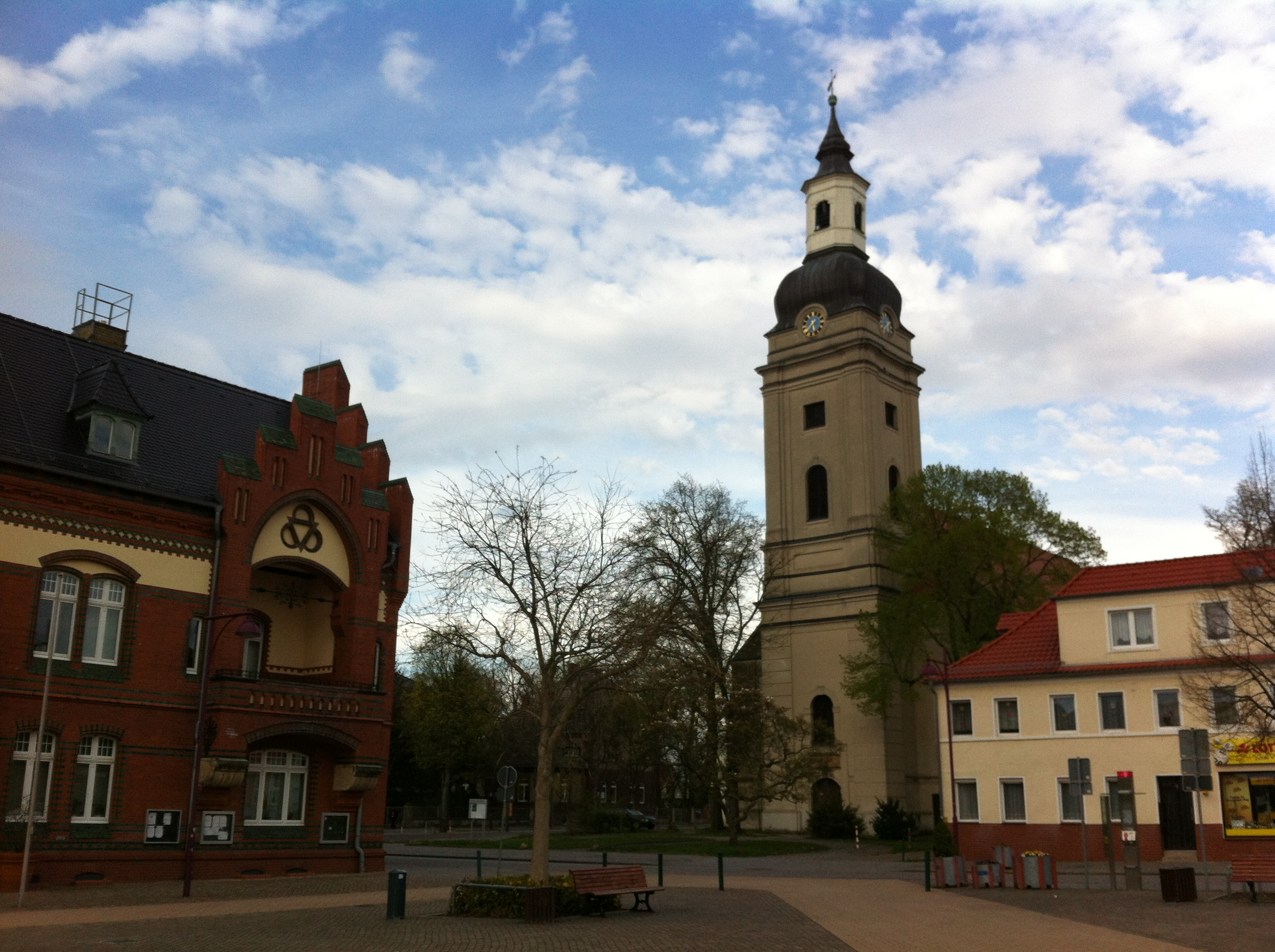
- Town hall and Trinity Church

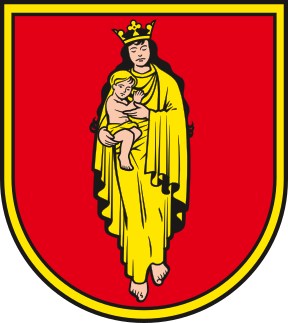
- Coat of arms

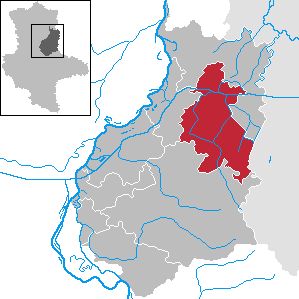
- Location of Genthin within Jerichower Land district
- Interactive map of Genthin
- Location within Germany Location within Saxony-Anhalt
- Coordinates: 52°24′N 12°10′E
- Country: Germany
- State: Saxony-Anhalt
- District: Jerichower Land
- Subdivisions: 8

Government
  - Mayor (2018–25): Dagmar Turian

Area
  - Total: 230.73 km^{2} (89.09 sq mi)
- Elevation: 49 m (161 ft)

Population (2025-12-31)
  - Total: 13,392
  - Density: 58.042/km^{2} (150.33/sq mi)
- Time zone: UTC+01:00 (CET)
  - Summer (DST): UTC+02:00 (CEST)
- Postal codes: 39307
- Dialling codes: 03933, 039342, 039346
- Vehicle registration: JL
- Website: www.genthin.de

Genthin (German pronunciation: [ɡɛnˈtiːn]) is a town in Jerichower Land district, in Saxony-Anhalt, Germany.

== Geography ==
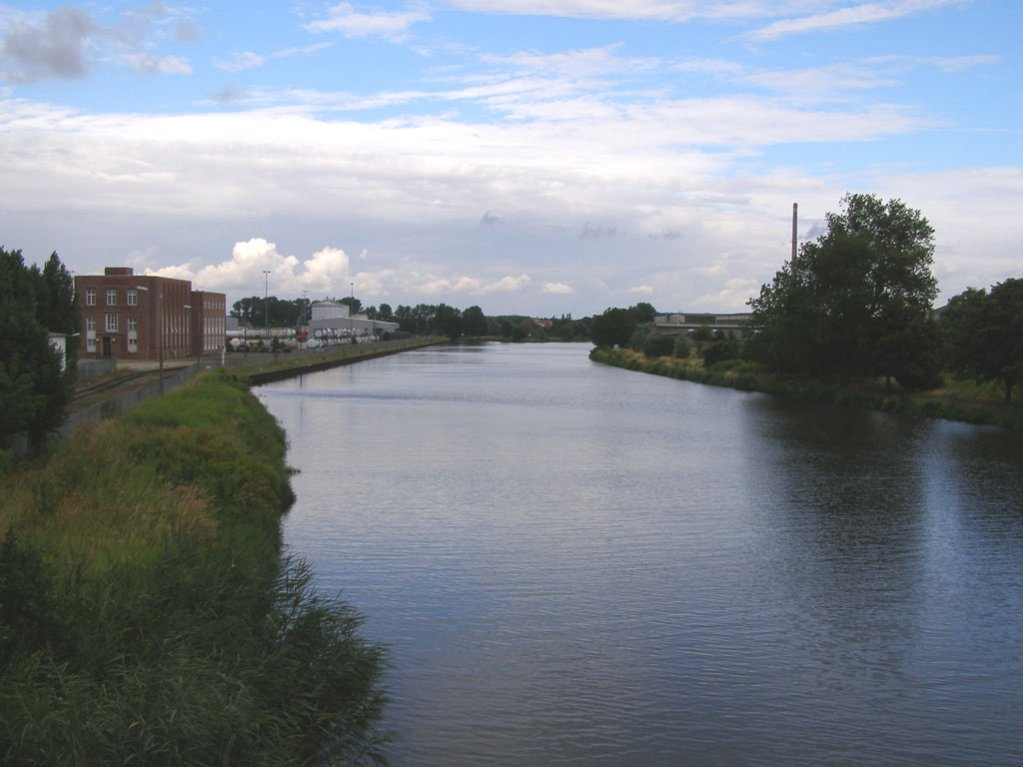
Elbe-Havel Canal

Genthin is situated east of the Elbe river on the Elbe-Havel Canal, approx. 50 km (31 mi) northeast of Magdeburg and 27 km (17 mi) west of Brandenburg.

The municipal area consists of Genthin proper and the following Ortschaften or municipal divisions:

- Fienerode
- Gladau
- Mützel
- Paplitz
- Parchen
- Schopsdorf
- Tucheim

The formerly independent municipalities Gladau, Paplitz and Tucheim were incorporated in July 2009, followed by Schopsdorf in July 2012.

Genthin was the administrative seat of the Verwaltungsgemeinschaft ("collective municipality") Elbe-Stremme-Fiener until its merger into the newly established Jerichow municipality in 2010.

== History ==
Genthin Castle was first mentioned in an 1144 deed, it was the residence of the Plotho noble family who then served as ministeriales of the Archbishops of Magdeburg. The surrounding settlement was documented as a town in 1459, its citizens were vested with market rights in 1539.

When the last administrator of the Magdeburg archbishopric, Duke Augustus of Saxe-Weissenfels, died in 1680, Genthin with the Duchy of Magdeburg fell to the Electors of Brandenburg. The Baroque Trinity parish church was erected from 1707 to 1722.

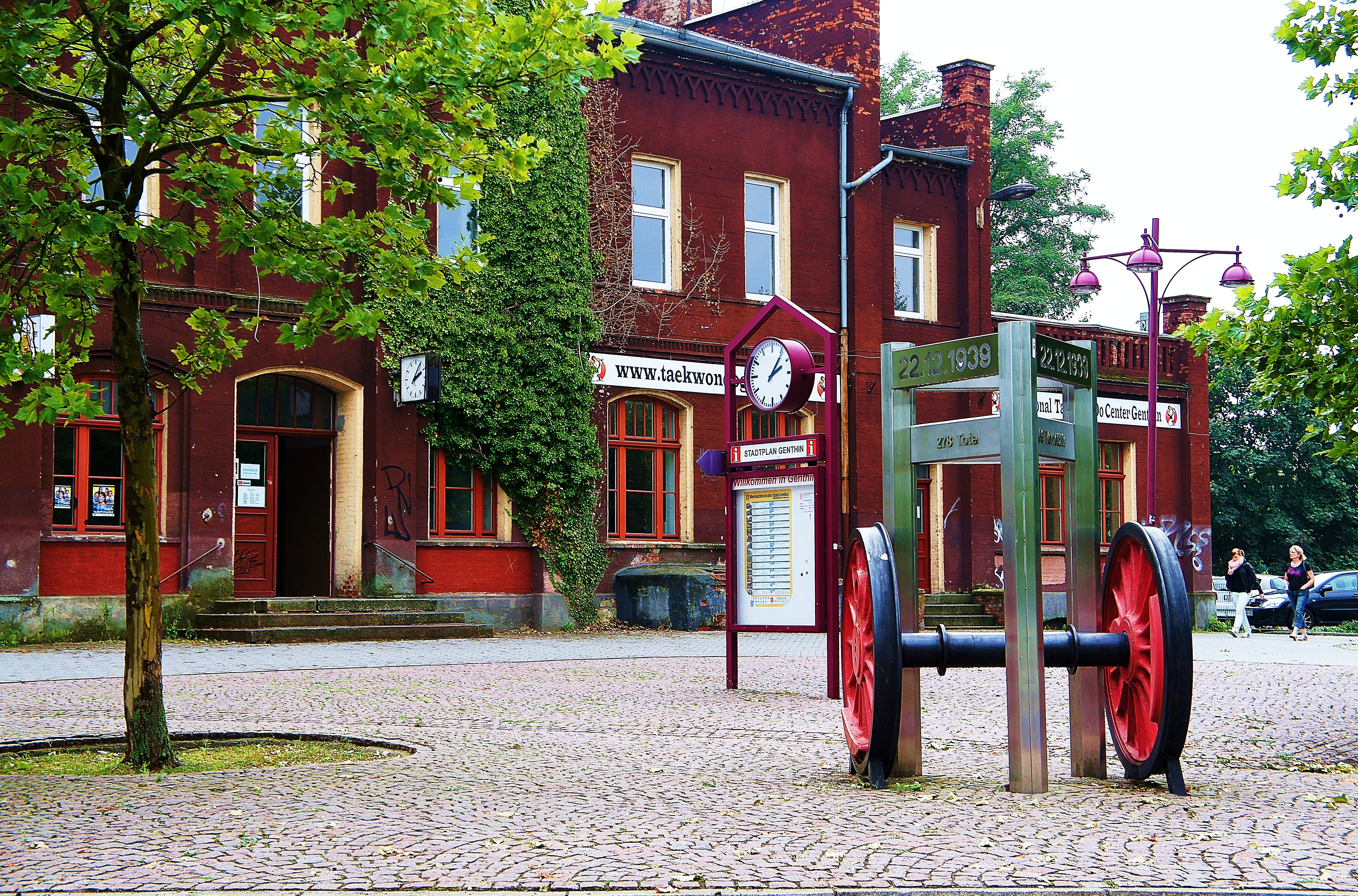
Genthin station with memorial

The town's economy was decisively promoted by the building of the Elbe–Havel Canal from 1743 onwards and the opening of the Berlin–Magdeburg railway line in 1846. A detergent factory was opened in 1921 by Henkel.

On the night of 21–22 December 1939, at least 186 (according to other sources: 278) people were killed in a train crash at Genthin station, making it one of the deadliest railway accidents in Germany. A monument to the victims was erected in the town. In 1943 a subcamp of Ravensbrück concentration camp was built in Genthin for about 1,000 female prisoners and forced labourers. After World War II, Genthin was part of the Soviet occupation zone.

== Climate ==
Climate data for Genthin (1991–2020 normals)
Month	Jan	Feb	Mar	Apr	May	Jun	Jul	Aug	Sep	Oct	Nov	Dec	Year
Mean daily maximum °C (°F)	3.8 (38.8)	5.0 (41.0)	9.4 (48.9)	15.4 (59.7)	19.6 (67.3)	23.0 (73.4)	25.4 (77.7)	24.9 (76.8)	20.1 (68.2)	13.9 (57.0)	8.1 (46.6)	4.5 (40.1)	14.6 (58.3)
Daily mean °C (°F)	1.3 (34.3)	1.5 (34.7)	4.8 (40.6)	9.3 (48.7)	13.7 (56.7)	17.2 (63.0)	19.4 (66.9)	18.7 (65.7)	14.3 (57.7)	9.3 (48.7)	5.1 (41.2)	2.0 (35.6)	9.8 (49.6)
Mean daily minimum °C (°F)	−1.8 (28.8)	−2.0 (28.4)	0.2 (32.4)	2.7 (36.9)	6.8 (44.2)	10.5 (50.9)	12.7 (54.9)	12.4 (54.3)	8.7 (47.7)	4.9 (40.8)	1.8 (35.2)	−0.8 (30.6)	4.7 (40.5)
Average precipitation mm (inches)	43.1 (1.70)	29.8 (1.17)	32.1 (1.26)	26.0 (1.02)	52.5 (2.07)	56.4 (2.22)	70.4 (2.77)	59.2 (2.33)	45.8 (1.80)	43.1 (1.70)	39.7 (1.56)	38.3 (1.51)	545.3 (21.47)
Average precipitation days (≥ 1.0 mm)	16.8	13.8	13.3	11.0	12.5	13.5	13.8	13.0	11.1	14.2	15.4	16.2	167.9
Average relative humidity (%)	85.2	81.4	76.1	67.8	68.7	67.4	67.5	69.6	76.2	83.3	87.7	86.9	76.5
Mean monthly sunshine hours	46.0	76.3	124.2	196.8	221.9	229.2	218.3	210.0	161.5	109.7	55.1	38.1	1,713.1
Source: World Meteorological Organization

== Mayor ==
Thomas Barz was elected mayor in 2013.

== Economy ==
The headquarters of the LFD Holding are in Genthin.

== Twin towns ==
Genthin is twinned with:

- Datteln, Germany, since 1990
- Radlin, Poland, since 2008

== Notable people ==
- Herms Niel (Hermann Nielebock) (1888-1954), conductor and composer
- Kurt von Manteuffell (1853-1922), Prussian General of the Infantry
- Walter Model (1891–1945), field marshal in WW II
- Norbert Dürpisch (born 1952), cyclist
- Bernd Dittert (born 1961), racing cyclist, Olympic champion and trainer
