= Gladau =

- Stadtteil of Genthin
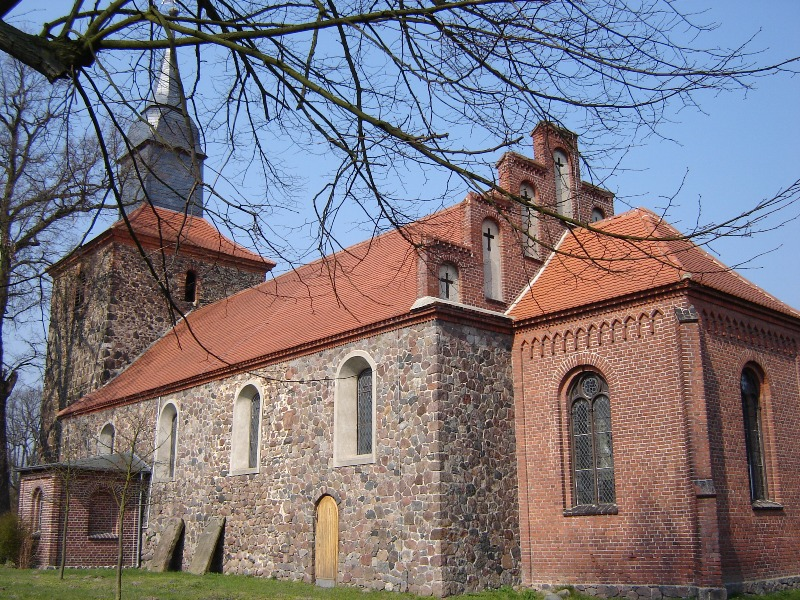
- Church

- Coat of arms
- Interactive map of Gladau
- Location within Germany Location within Saxony-Anhalt
- Coordinates: 52°18′16″N 12°5′25″E
- Country: Germany
- State: Saxony-Anhalt
- District: Jerichower Land
- Town: Genthin

Area
  - Total: 39.27 km^{2} (15.16 sq mi)
- Elevation: 50 m (160 ft)

Population (2006-12-31)
  - Total: 711
  - Density: 18.1/km^{2} (46.9/sq mi)
- Time zone: UTC+01:00 (CET)
  - Summer (DST): UTC+02:00 (CEST)
- Postal codes: 39307
- Dialling codes: 039342
- Vehicle registration: JL

Gladau is a village and a former municipality in the Jerichower Land district, in Saxony-Anhalt, Germany. Since 1 July 2009, it is part of the town Genthin.
