= Berlin–Magdeburg railway =

Railway line in Germany

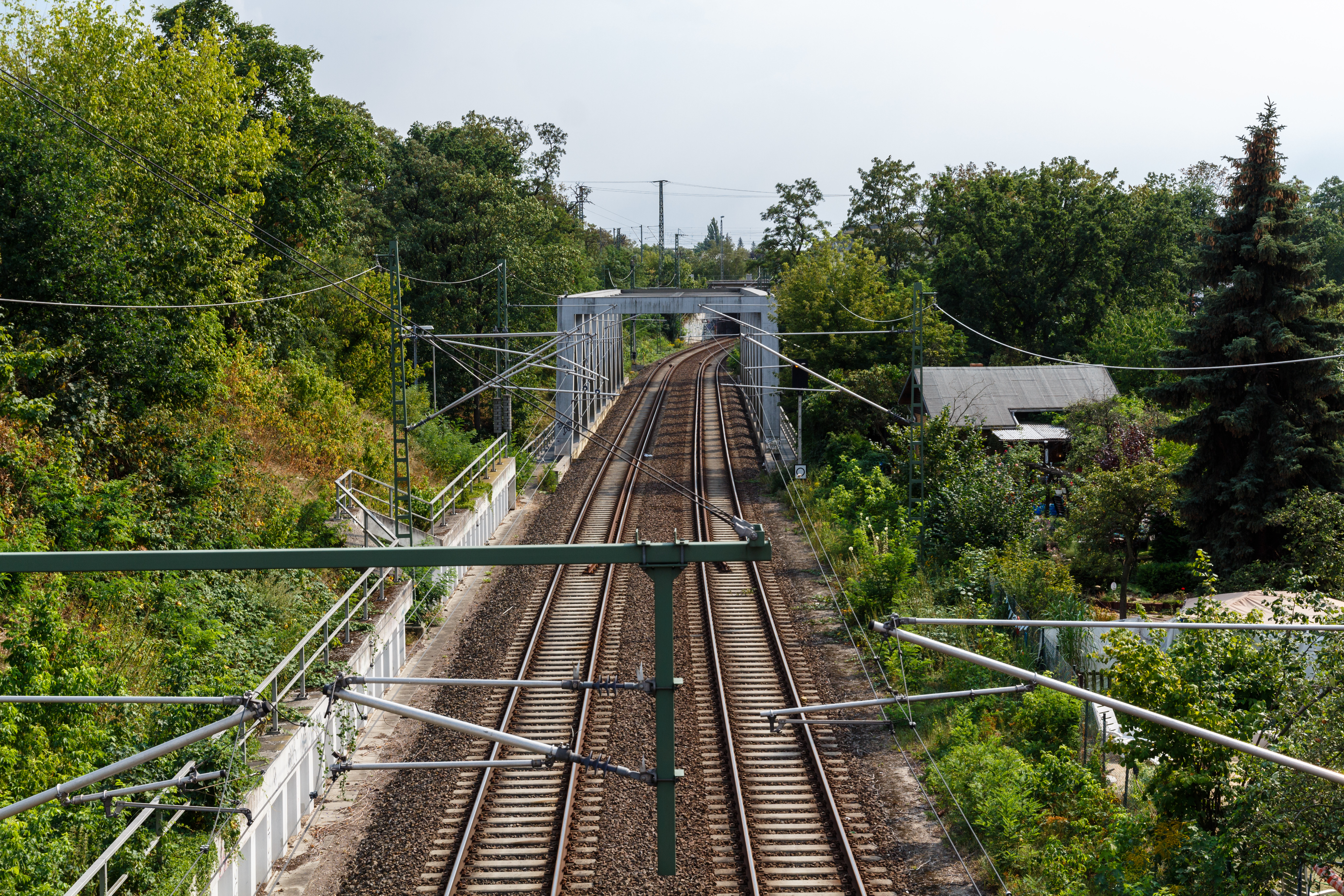
- A section of the line in 2015

Overview
- Line number: 6110, 6125, 6177; 6024 S-Bahn Wannsee–Potsdam
- Locale: Berlin, Brandenburg, Saxony-Anhalt, Germany

Service
- Route number: 201

Technical
- Line length: 141.9 km (88.2 mi)
- Number of tracks: 2
- Track gauge: 1,435 mm (4 ft 8 1/2 in) standard gauge
- Electrification: Berlin S-Bahn: 800 V third rail; Griebnitzsee–Magdeburg: 15 kV/16.7 Hz AC overhead catenary
- Operating speed: 160 km/h (99.4 mph) (maximum)
Route map
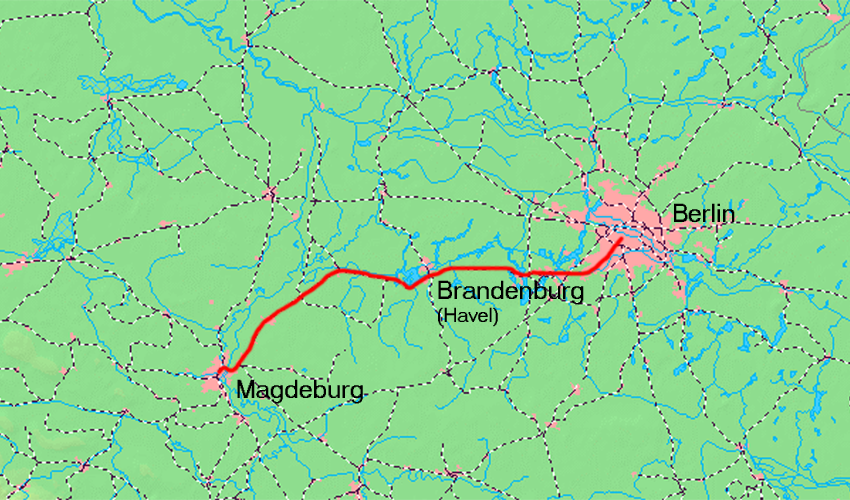
- Source: German railway atlas

The first section of the Berlin–Magdeburg Railway was opened in 1838 as the Berlin-Potsdam Railway also known as trunk line (German: Stammbahn) and was the first railway line in Prussia. In 1846 it was extended to Magdeburg.

== History ==
=== The first railway in Prussia ===
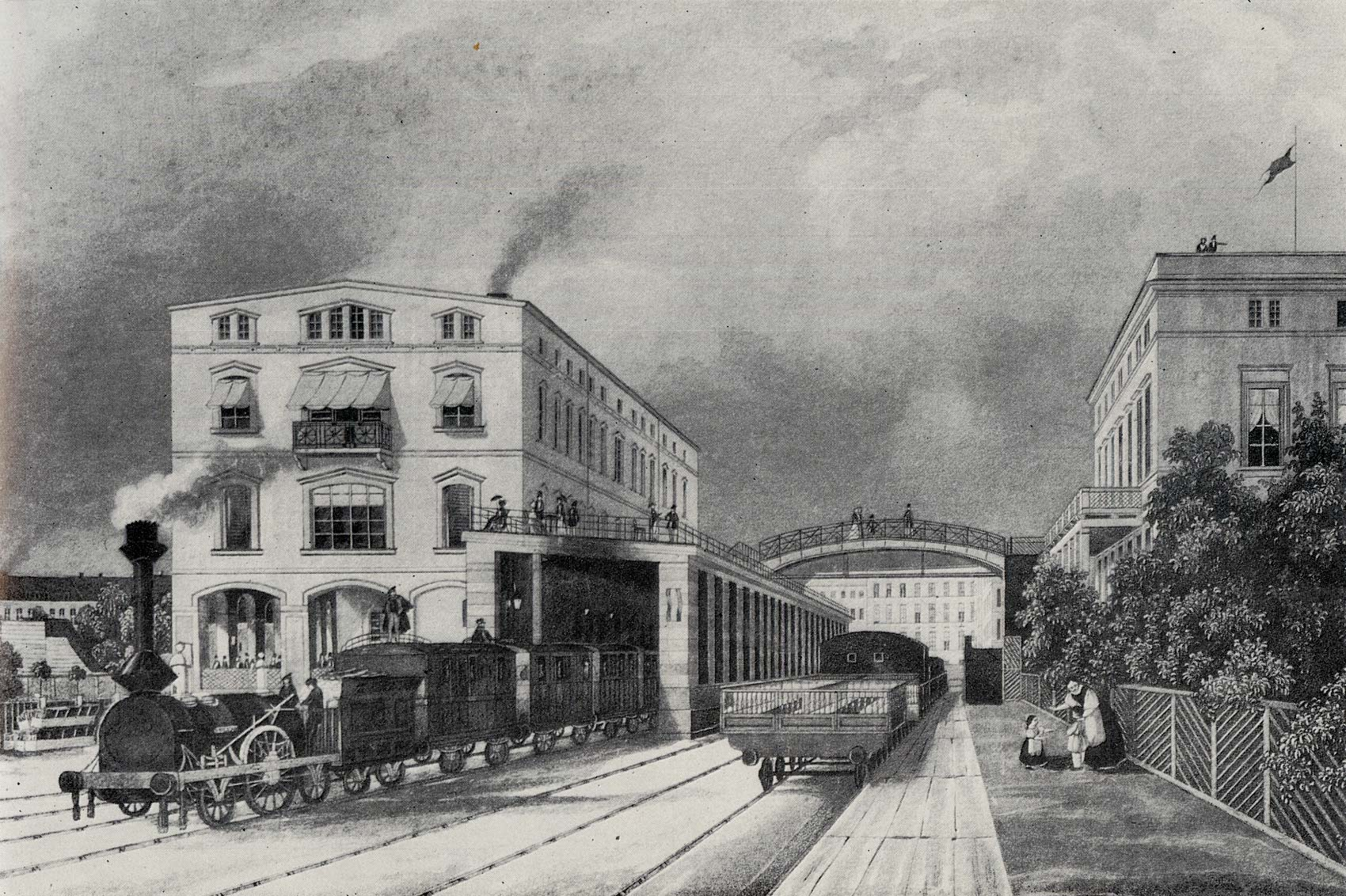
The Potsdam Railway station in Berlin in 1843

The Prussian Royal residence was located at Potsdam approximately 25 km west of Berlin, which at the beginning of the 19th century already had more than 200,000 inhabitants. Although railways were already being built in England, the sceptical attitude of the King Friedrich Wilhelm III delayed the establishment of a railway in Prussia. After the opening of the Bavarian Ludwig Railway showed that railways could be operated economically in Germany, it was decided to establish a railway in Prussia. The Prussian Railway Act of 3 November 1838 established the basis for operating private railway companies and also provided for the Prussian state to take them over after 30 years.

The Berlin-Potsdam Railway opened the first section of its line in autumn 1838 (the section between Potsdam and Zehlendorf on 22 September and the main line to Berlin on 29 October). The Potsdamer Bahnhof opened in 1838 just outside the outside Potsdamer Tor (a gate in Berlin's tax wall). In 1837, the Berlin–Potsdam Railway Company acquired land for the station from the Unity of the Brethren in Berlin and Rixdorf for 12,400 thalers. Its Potsdam station was southeast of the city on the other bank of the Havel river, where it also established a rail workshop. The first railway stations between Berlin and Potsdam were Zehlendorf (established in 1838), Schöneberg (1839) and Steglitz (1839).

== The Berlin-Potsdam-Magdeburg Railway Company ==
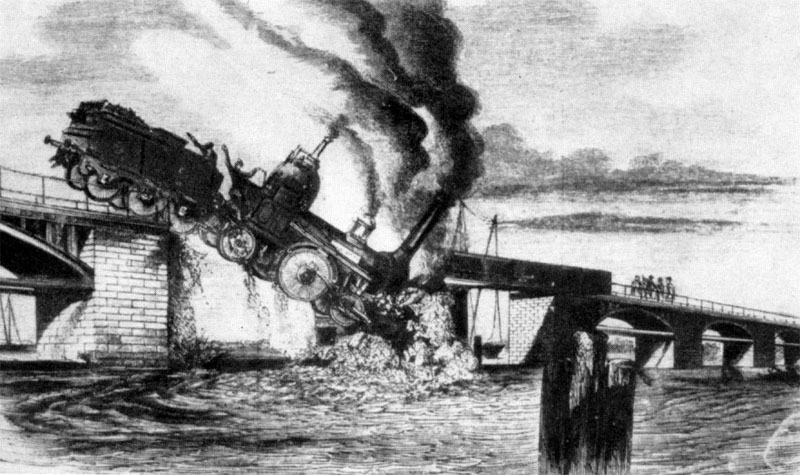
Crash of the locomotive Jupiter into the Havel, 1856

The Potsdam-Magdeburg Railway Company (German: Potsdam-Magdeburger Eisenbahngesellschaft) was founded 1845, receiving royal assent on 17 August 1845. It extended the Berlin–Potsdam line to Magdeburg and was later merged with the Berlin–Potsdam Railway to create the Berlin–Potsdam–Magdeburg Railway Company (German: Berlin-Potsdam-Magdeburger Eisenbahngesellschaft).

Although the Potsdam station was directly connected with central Potsdam by the Long Bridge (German: Lange Brücke), the extension of the railway towards Brandenburg over the Havel and on to Magdeburg was very difficult. Directly west of the Potsdam station the line had to cross the Havel and Neustädter Bay, requiring several bridges. In the same section it had to cross the Potsdamer Stadtkanal (Potsdam City Canal, located in the modern Dortustraße), requiring another bridge. The track in this whole section was laid on an embankment. The line from Potsdam Kiewitt (west of Neustädter Bay) to Magdeburg was opened on 7 August 1846, but the Havel crossing was not opened until 12 September 1846, completing the line from Berlin to Magdeburg.

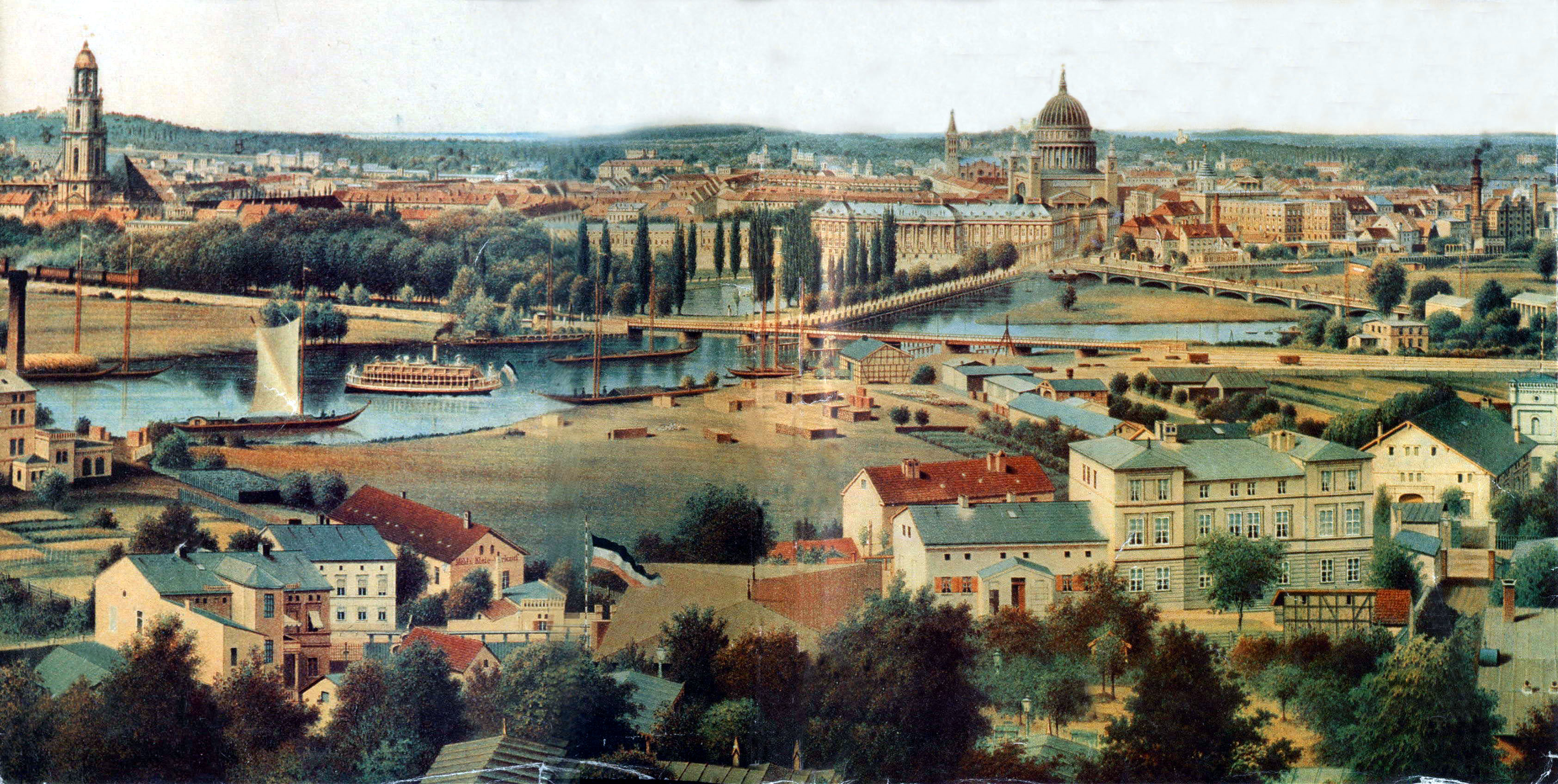
The Havel bridge in Potsdam in 1871

The line had to cross the Havel again near Werder to connect to Werder station on the shore. In order to reach the Elbe station from Magdeburg-Buckau the railway had to cross the Old Elbe, the Taube Elbe, the main Elbe rivers and the island between them containing the district of Werder. Until the completion of the main bridge over the Elbe, the Buckau Railway Bridge, a vertical lift bridge, in 1848 trains terminated at Magdeburg-Friedrichstadt station. By 1847, the trunk line had been largely converted to double track.

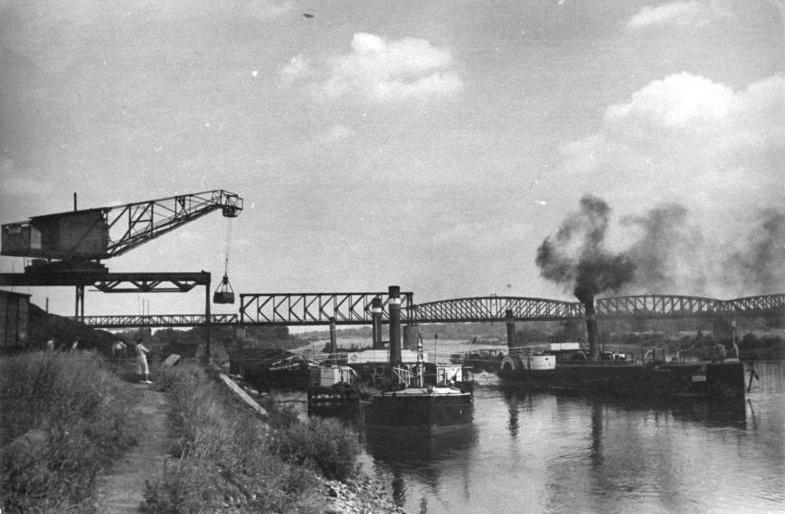
The Herrenkrug bridge over the Elbe River in Magdeburg

In 1870, the Berlin–Potsdam–Magdeburg Railway Company, together with the Magdeburg–Halberstadt Railway Company and the Magdeburg-Leipzig Railway Company bought a 55-hectare (140-acre) site for the construction of Magdeburg central station. The Berlin–Potsdam–Magdeburger railway built its station at the western end of the station complex. It built a new line between Burg and Magdeburg, crossing the ridge of the Hohen Fläming in Moser and the Herrenkrug Railway Bridge and abandoning the old line from Burg via Niegripp, Hohenwarthe, Lostau and Gerwisch.

On 1 June 1874, a branch from Zehlendorf, the Wannsee Railway (later known as the Old Wannsee line) with stations at Schlachtensee and Wannsee was opened. In the same year, stations at Friedenau, Lichterfelde and Griebnitzsee were opened for local services.

=== Nationalisation and upgrading from 1883 ===
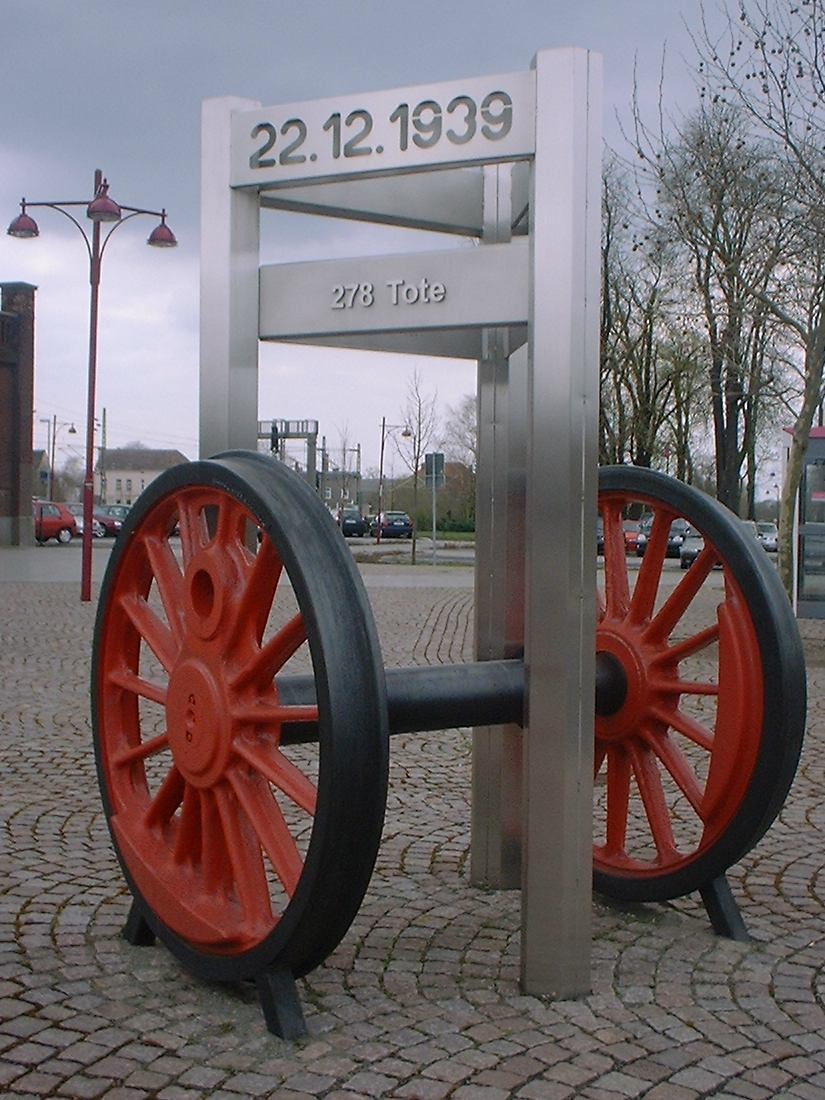
Memorial to the 22 December 1939 crash

On 1 October 1891, the New Wannsee line open from Zehlendorf to Berlin parallel with the trunk line. It served suburban traffic while long-distance trains ran on the trunk line to Magdeburg.

Following the opening of the Brandenburg City Railway in 1904 Brandenburg developed as an important railway junction. In particular, a steel works was built there in 1913, providing the line with a high volume of freight. In 1928 the Berlin S-Bahn was extended from Wannsee to Potsdam. On 15 May 1933, the long-distance trunk line between Berlin and Zehlendorf was also electrified. This allowed the so-called "banker trains " of the S-Bahn from the Wannsee line to change at Zehlendorf to the trunk line and then run without stopping until Potsdam station. In addition electric railcars operating on the long-distance lines continued as steam hauled suburban trains along the direct route to Potsdam without going through Wannsee. Düppel station was opened in 1939 for local traffic.

On 22 December 1939 the worst railway accident in German history occurred at Genthin station, with 278 people killed and another 453 people seriously injured. The night express D 180 (Berlin–Potsdam–Neunkirchen (Saar) ran at high speed, ignoring several signals, into an overcrowded D 10 express from Berlin to Cologne. Visibility that night was very poor due to heavy drizzle and fog, so the D 180 train ran through a signal at danger at Belicke and ran into the D 10 at 100 to 110 km/h. The contemporary news media understated the death toll and gave only limited coverage of the accident.

The war-damaged Potsdam station closed in 1945 and the southern section of the S-Bahn was closed in 1945–1946 and never reopened.

=== Postwar ===
The badly damaged Herrenkrug bridge in Magdeburg was temporarily repaired and put back into operation on 12 March 1946. In order to supply reparations to the Soviet Union the second track was removed from sections of the line until 1948.

=== The section in West Berlin ===
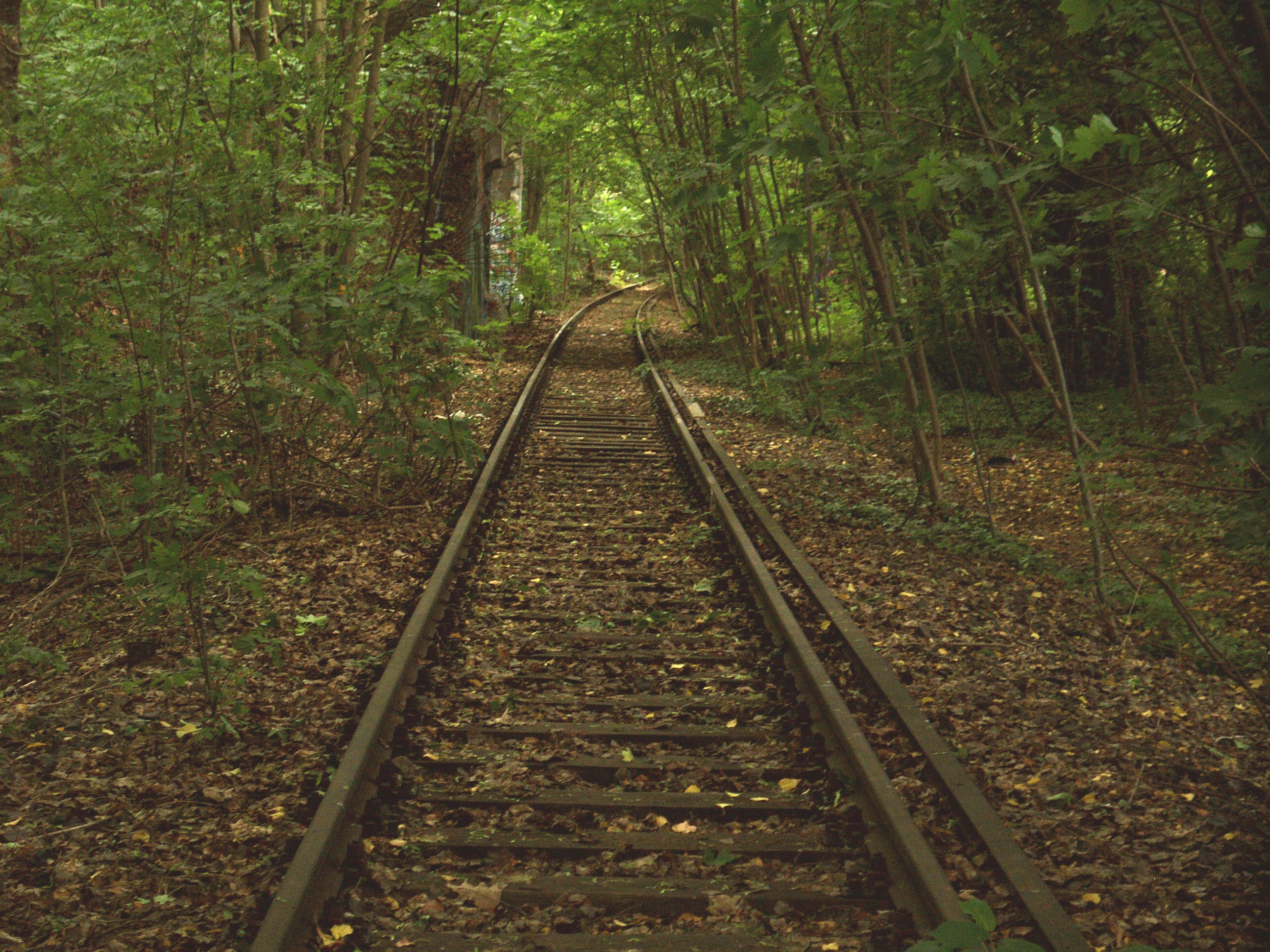
The Stammbahn, the former trunk line near Zehlendorf

In April 1945, the railway bridge over the Teltow Canal was blown up and later the track between Griebnitzsee and Düppel was singled to provide reparations. As of 1 December 1945, therefore, only shuttles ran between Düppel and Zehlendorf.

As of 15 June 1948 this section was electrified, to reduce the significant costs of steam operations. The line was affected by the boycott of the S-Bahn by potential passengers from West Berlin after the building of the Berlin Wall and the establishment of parallel bus routes. Trains often ran without a single passenger, although a driver and ticket collector were still required. Nevertheless, on 20 December 1972, the East Germany Railways established the new station of Zehlendorf Süd between Zehlendorf and Düppel near a new residential area in an attempt to increase passenger numbers.

After the West Berlin railway employees strike in late summer 1980, S-Bahn operations were closed on18 September 1980 on the Zehlendorf–Düppel section. The platform equipment were gradually dismantled and used elsewhere and the buildings collapsed over the years.

=== The Potsdam–Magdeburg main line in the German Democratic Republic ===
In 1952 border controls were installed in the formerly suburban station of Griebnitzsee. Due to the dismantling of the second track the capacity of the main line was greatly reduced. The opening of the Berlin outer ring in 1957 long-distance trains between Berlin and Werder (Havel) shifted to the new route to Berlin, with a new Potsdam Hauptbahnhof (now Potsdam Pirschheide) taking over the functions of the former Potsdam station, which was now served only by local trains. After the establishment of the Berlin Wall the Griebnitzsee border control station on the main railway was expanded for transit between East and West Berlin, with substantial changes to track work. The restoration of the second track between Magdeburg and Werder was completed in 1976. In 1983 the second track was restored to the section between Werder and Berlin-Wannsee.

=== Developments since 1989 ===
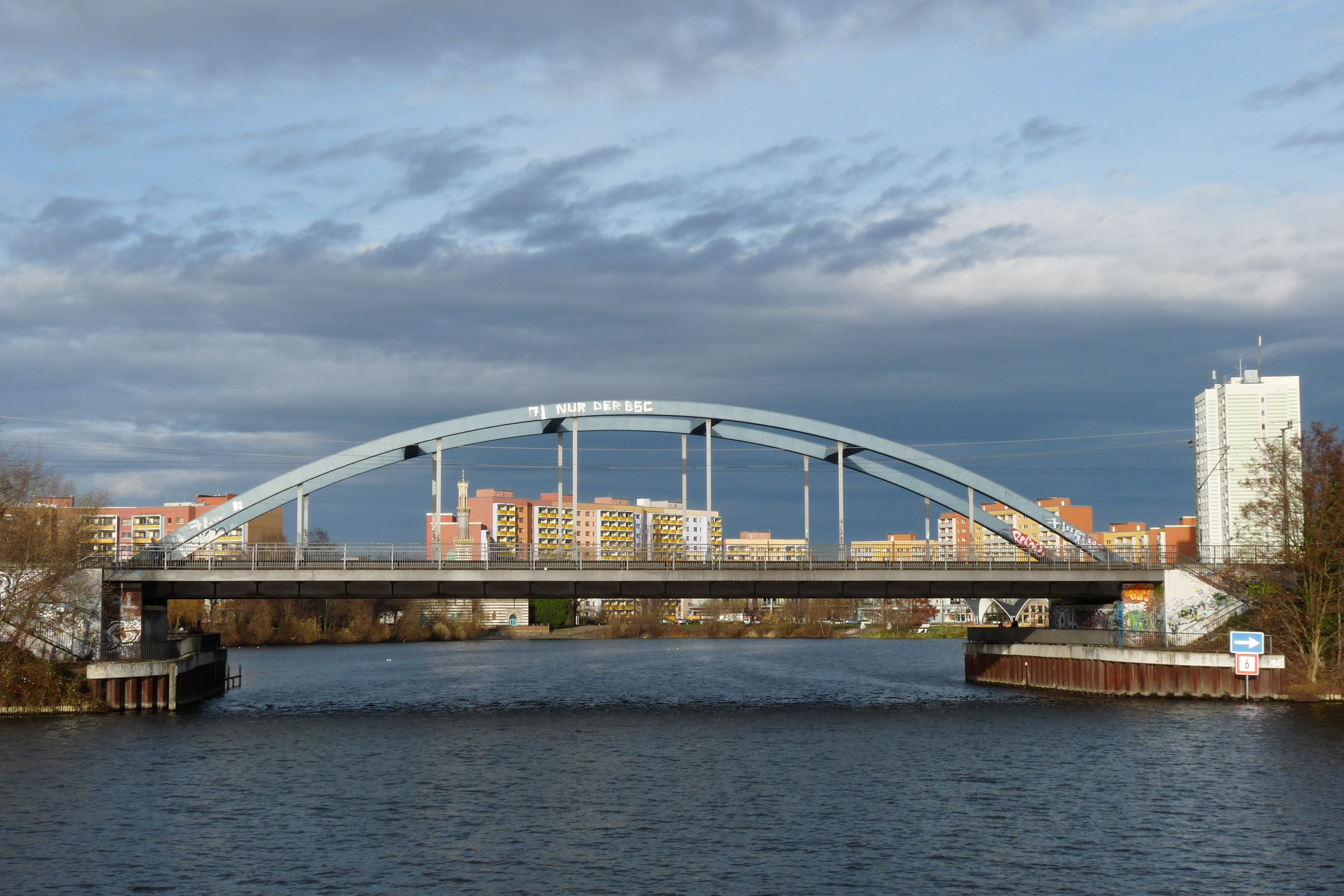
New rail bridge over Neustädter Havelbucht in Potsdam

With the completion of the electrification of the Griebnitzsee–Brandenburg an der Havel–Biederitz section in December 1995, Intercity-Express trains could now take the direct route via Brandenburg instead of the now partially closed route through Bad Belzig and Güterglück (the strategic railway known as the Kanonenbahn, the "Cannons Railway"). At the same time the line was upgraded for a top speed of 160 km/h. The bridges over the Havel and Neustädter Bay in Potsdam had to be replaced, one of them with a new 57-metre tied-arch bridge, completed on 10 May 1995. The other bridge, a 90-year-old steel truss bridge had already been replaced.

After the opening of the Hanover–Berlin high-speed line in September 1998, long-distance traffic shifted to that route and the number of trains on the line through Brandenburg and Magdeburg fell heavily. After the Potsdam station was bombed and badly damaged in 1945 a minor building temporarily served as the main station building. Due to the reduced importance of the station during the Communist period the temporary station was able to handle the load. In 1999 the new Potsdam Hauptbahnhof was opened with three platforms (one for the Berlin S-Bahn) and a variety of shops. In the course of the work the former Potsdam freight yard was demolished.

== Projects ==
=== The planned reconstruction of the trunk line ===
After reunification there were initially plans to reopen the disused section of the trunk line (German: Stammbahn) between Berlin and Potsdam. As part of the construction of the new North–south main line for long-distance and regional trains, the tunnel under the Tiergarten includes structures allowing a connection at a later stage to the trunk line.

Until recently, this project has not been considered to be economically justified. The entire trunk line between the Gleisdreieck area and Zehlendorf station would have to be rebuilt. The route would have to be widened to fit in a double track line at the spacings now required. Furthermore, many of the road bridges would have to be rebuilt to allow sufficient vertical clearances for electric operation. Other railway bridges would also need to be renewed to overcome aging or inadequate clearances. The section between the Zehlendorf and Düppel stations would have to be rebuilt. In addition, there is limited potential additional traffic, with long-distance traffic now mostly transferred to the Hanover–Berlin high-speed line and regional traffic able to use the route via Wannsee to the Berlin Stadtbahn.

Since then, however, the premises have changed significantly, as both Berlin and Potsdam as well as Kleinmachnow/Teltow/Stahnsdorf are experiencing strong population growth, and the line would also effectively relieve the now overloaded Berlin Stadtbahn. In May 2022, the Brandenburg state government and the Berlin Senate announced in a joint declaration that the trunk line is to be rebuilt as a regional railway line, which is also supported by Deutsche Bahn.
