= Elbe-Stremme-Fiener =

- Verwaltungsgemeinschaft
- Interactive map of Elbe-Stremme-Fiener
- Location within Germany Location within Saxony-Anhalt
- Coordinates: 52°24′N 12°10′E
- Country: Germany
- State: Saxony-Anhalt
- District: Jerichower Land
- Disbanded: 1 January 2010

Area
  - Total: 269.89 km^{2} (104.21 sq mi)

Population (2006-12-31)
  - Total: 7,942
  - Density: 29.43/km^{2} (76.22/sq mi)
- Time zone: UTC+01:00 (CET)
  - Summer (DST): UTC+02:00 (CEST)
- Vehicle registration: JL
- Website: www.vgem-esf.de

Elbe-Stremme-Fiener was a Verwaltungsgemeinschaft ("collective municipality") in the Jerichower Land district, in Saxony-Anhalt, Germany. It was situated north of Genthin, which was the seat of the Verwaltungsgemeinschaft, but not part of it.

It was disbanded on 1 January 2010.

== Subdivision ==
The Verwaltungsgemeinschaft Elbe-Stremme-Fiener consisted of the following municipalities:

1. Brettin
2. Demsin
3. Jerichow
4. Kade
5. Karow
6. Klitsche
7. Nielebock
8. Redekin
9. Roßdorf
10. Schlagenthin
11. Wulkow
12. Zabakuck
