= Bellingrodt =

Bellingrodt is the name of the following people:

- Carl Bellingrodt (1897–1971), German railway photographer
- Hanspeter Bellingrodt (1943–2024), Colombian Olympic sports shooter
- Helmut Bellingrodt (born 1949), Colombian sport shooter, Olympic silver medallist
- Horst Bellingrodt (born 1958), Colombian Olympic sports shooter
