= George Ziemann =

George Ziemann may refer to:

- George Patrick Ziemann (1941–2009), Roman Catholic bishop
- George William Ziemann (1806/09–1881), Christian missionary
