= DRG Class 24 =

German steam locomotive class (1928–1972)

DRG Class 24 DR Class 37.10 PKP Oi2
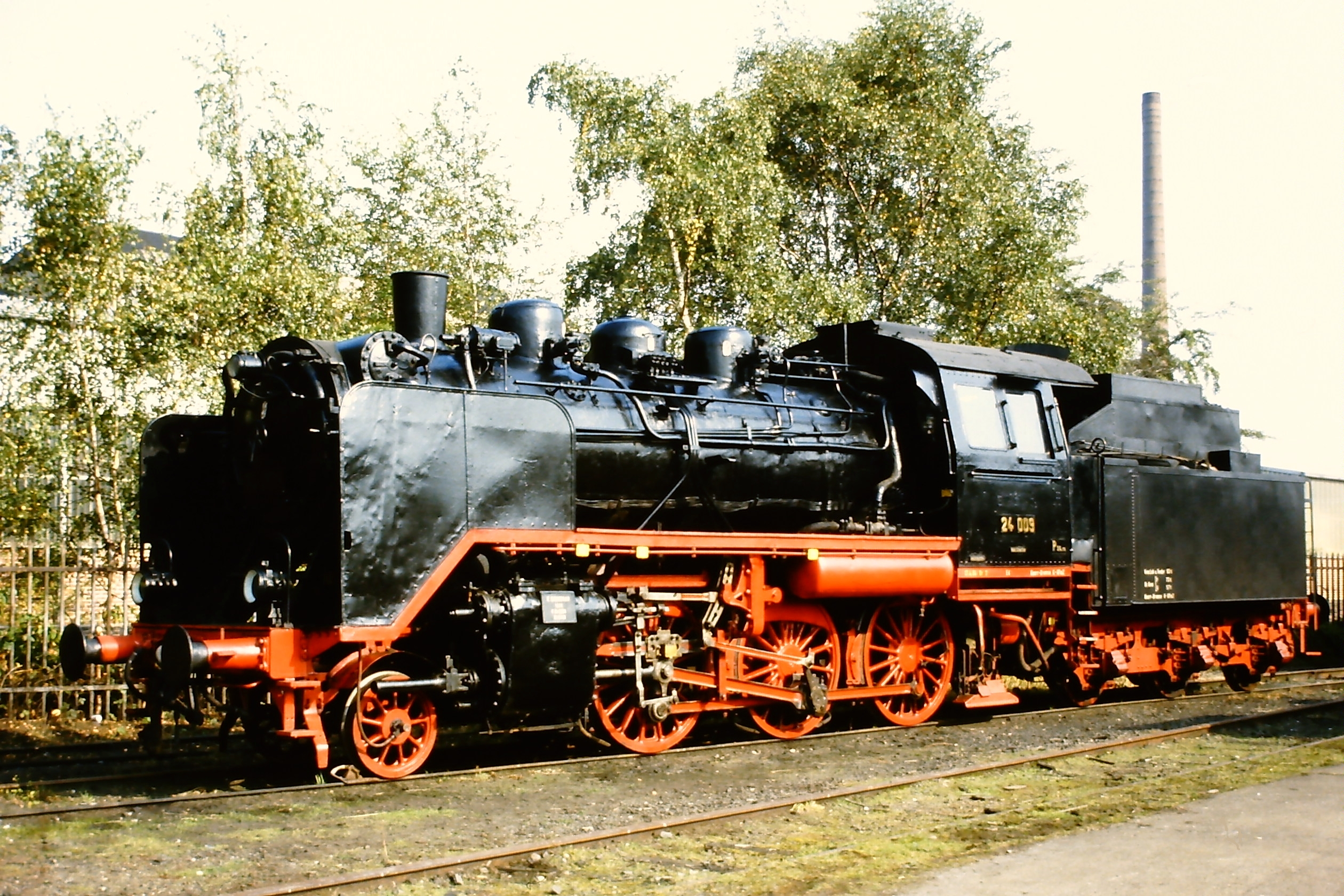
- 24 009 in the Bochum-Dahlhausen railway museum, October 1985
Type and origin
- Power type: Steam
- Builder: Schichau-Werke (67); Hanomag (8); Henschel (5); Krupp (6); Borsig (2); Linke-Hofmann (7)
- Build date: 1928–1939
- Total produced: 95
Specifications
- Configuration
  - Whyte: 2-6-0
  - UIC: 1′C h2
  - German: P 34.15
- Gauge: 1,435 mm (4 ft 8 1/2 in)
- Leading dia.: 850 mm (2 ft 9 1/2 in)
- Driver dia.: 1,500 mm (4 ft 11 in)
- Tender wheels: 1,000 mm (3 ft 3 3/8 in)
- Wheelbase
  - Axle spacing (Asymmetrical): 2,700 mm (8 ft 10 1/4 in) +; 1,800 mm (5 ft 10 7/8 in) +; 1,800 mm (5 ft 10 7/8 in) =
  - Engine: 6,300 mm (20 ft 8 in)
  - Tender: 1,900 mm (6 ft 2 3/4 in) +; 1,900 mm (6 ft 2 3/4 in) =; 3,800 mm (12 ft 5 5/8 in)
  - incl. tender: 13,270 mm (43 ft 6 1/2 in)
- Length
  - Over headstocks: 15,655 mm (51 ft 4 3/8 in)
  - Over buffers: 16,955 mm (55 ft 7 1/2 in)
- Height: 4,165 mm (13 ft 8 in)
- Axle load: 15.1 t (14.9 long tons; 16.6 short tons)
- Adhesive weight: 45.2 t (44.5 long tons; 49.8 short tons)
- Empty weight: 52.0 t (51.2 long tons; 57.3 short tons)
- Service weight: 57.4 t (56.5 long tons; 63.3 short tons)
- Tender type: 3 T 16
- Fuel type: Coal
- Fuel capacity: 6 t (5.9 long tons; 6.6 short tons)
- Water cap.: 16 m^{3} (3,500 imp gal; 4,200 US gal)
- Firebox
  - Grate area: 2.04 m^{2} (22.0 sq ft)
- Boiler
  - Pitch: 2,700 mm (8 ft 10 1/4 in)
  - Tube plates: 3,800 mm (12 ft 5 5/8 in)
  - Small tubes: 44.5 mm (1 3/4 in), 114 off
  - Large tubes: 118 mm (4 5/8 in), 32 off
- Boiler pressure: 14 bar (14.3 kgf/cm^{2}; 203 psi)
- Heating surface
  - Firebox: 8.7 m^{2} (94 sq ft)
  - Tubes: 53.7 m^{2} (578 sq ft)
  - Flues: 42.0 m^{2} (452 sq ft)
  - Total surface: 104.4 m^{2} (1,124 sq ft)
- Superheater
  - Heating area: 37.18 m^{2} (400.2 sq ft)
- Cylinders: Two, outside
- Cylinder size: 500 mm × 660 mm (19 11/16 in × 26 in)
- Valve gear: Walschaerts with Kuhn slides
- Loco brake: Automatic, single-chamber, Knorr compressed-air brakes, operating on coupled and carrying wheels from the front
Performance figures
- Maximum speed: 90 km/h (56 mph)
- Indicated power: 920 PS (677 kW; 907 hp)
Career
- Operators: Deutsche Reichsbahn; Deutsche Bundesbahn; Deutsche Reichsbahn (GDR); Polish State Railways
- Retired: 1972
- Disposition: Four preserved, remainder scrapped

The DRG Class 24 steam engines were German standard locomotives (Einheitslokomotiven) built for the Deutsche Reichsbahn between 1928 and 1939 to haul passenger trains.

== History ==
These engines, nickname the 'prairie horse' (Steppenpferd) were developed specially for the long, flat routes in West and East Prussia. 95 examples were built by the firms of Schichau, Linke-Hofmann and others. The two units with operating numbers 24 069 and 24 070 were supplied by Borsig with a medium pressure boiler. These locos ran with a boiler overpressure of 25 bar (25.5 kgf/cm^{2}; 363 psi), but were rebuilt by DB in 1952.

The Deutsche Bundesbahn took over 38 locomotives and retired them by 1966. The last one with the DB was locomotive number 24 067, which was stabled in Rheydt and taken out of service there in August 1966. The engines were given operating numbers 24 001 to 24 095.

Engine numbers 24 002, 004, 009, 021 and 030 were left with the DR after the Second World War. They were all stabled in Jerichow shed in 1960 and their sphere of operations until 1968 was the branch line network of the Kleinbahn AG in Genthin. No. 24 009 was re-numbered in 1970 to 37 1009 and was used as a reserve breakdown engine in Güsten and Stendal. In 1972 it was sold to the West German railway magazine Eisenbahn-Kurier.

Thirty-four locomotive remained in Poland after the Second World War, where PKP classified them as Oi2. They served until the last one was withdrawn in 1976. One of the preserved locomotives in Germany, no. 24 083, had been in service in Poland.

The locomotives were equipped with 3 T 16 and 3 T 17 tenders.

Four Class 24 locomotives have been preserved: three in Germany (24 004, 24 009 and 24 083), and one in Poland (Oi2-29).

== See also ==
- List of DRG locomotives and railbuses

== Literature ==
- Klaus-Detlev Holzborn (2015): Der Sonderling 24 061. In: Eisenbahn-Magazin. Nr. 7, ISSN 0342-1902, S. 14.
- Hütter, Ingo (2009). Die Dampflokomotiven der Baureihen 01 bis 45 der DRG, DRB, DB, und DR (in German). Werl: DGEG Medien. pp. 223–226. ISBN 978-3-937189-45-1.
- Wenzel, Hansjürgen (2012). Die Baureihe 24. Die kleinste Einheits-Schlepptenderlok (in German). Freiburg: EK-Verlag. ISBN 978-3-88255-124-2.
- Weisbrod, Manfred; Müller, Hans; Petznik, Wolfgang (1976). Dampflokomotiven deutscher Eisenbahnen, Baureihe 01–39 (EFA 1.1) (in German) (3rd ed.). Düsseldorf: Alba Buchverlag. pp. 184–187. ISBN 3-87094-081-6.
