= Roßdorf (disambiguation) =

Roßdorf may refer to the following places in Germany:

- Roßdorf, a municipality in the district Darmstadt-Dieburg, Hesse
- Roßdorf, Saxony-Anhalt, a municipality in the district Jerichower Land, Saxony-Anhalt
- Roßdorf, Thuringia, a municipality in the district Schmalkalden-Meiningen, Thuringia
