= Romanesque Road =

Scenic route in Germany

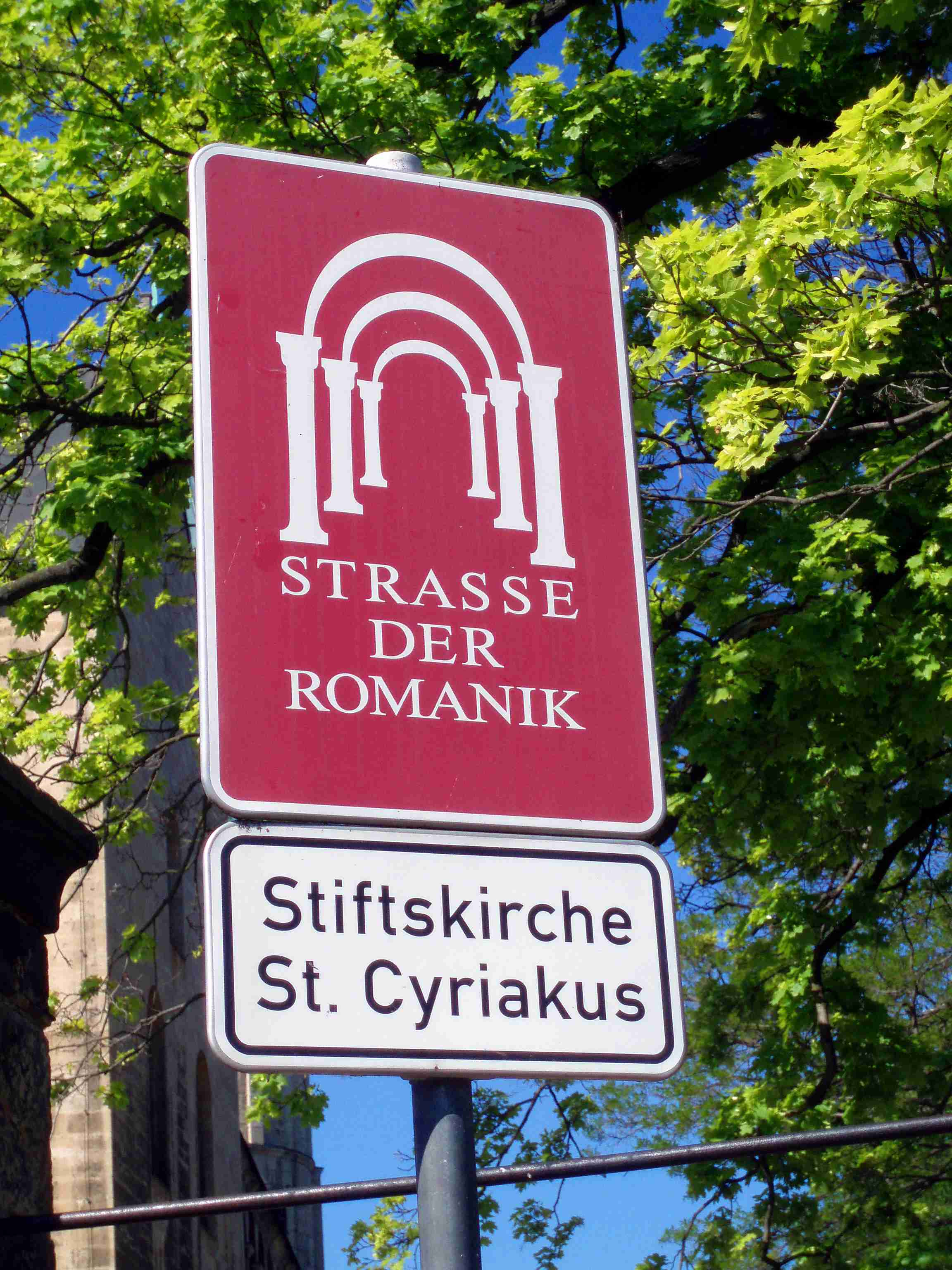
Road sign at Gernrode

The Romanesque Road (German: Straße der Romanik) is a scenic route in the state of Saxony-Anhalt in central-east Germany. It is part of the Transromanica network, a major European Cultural Route since 2006.

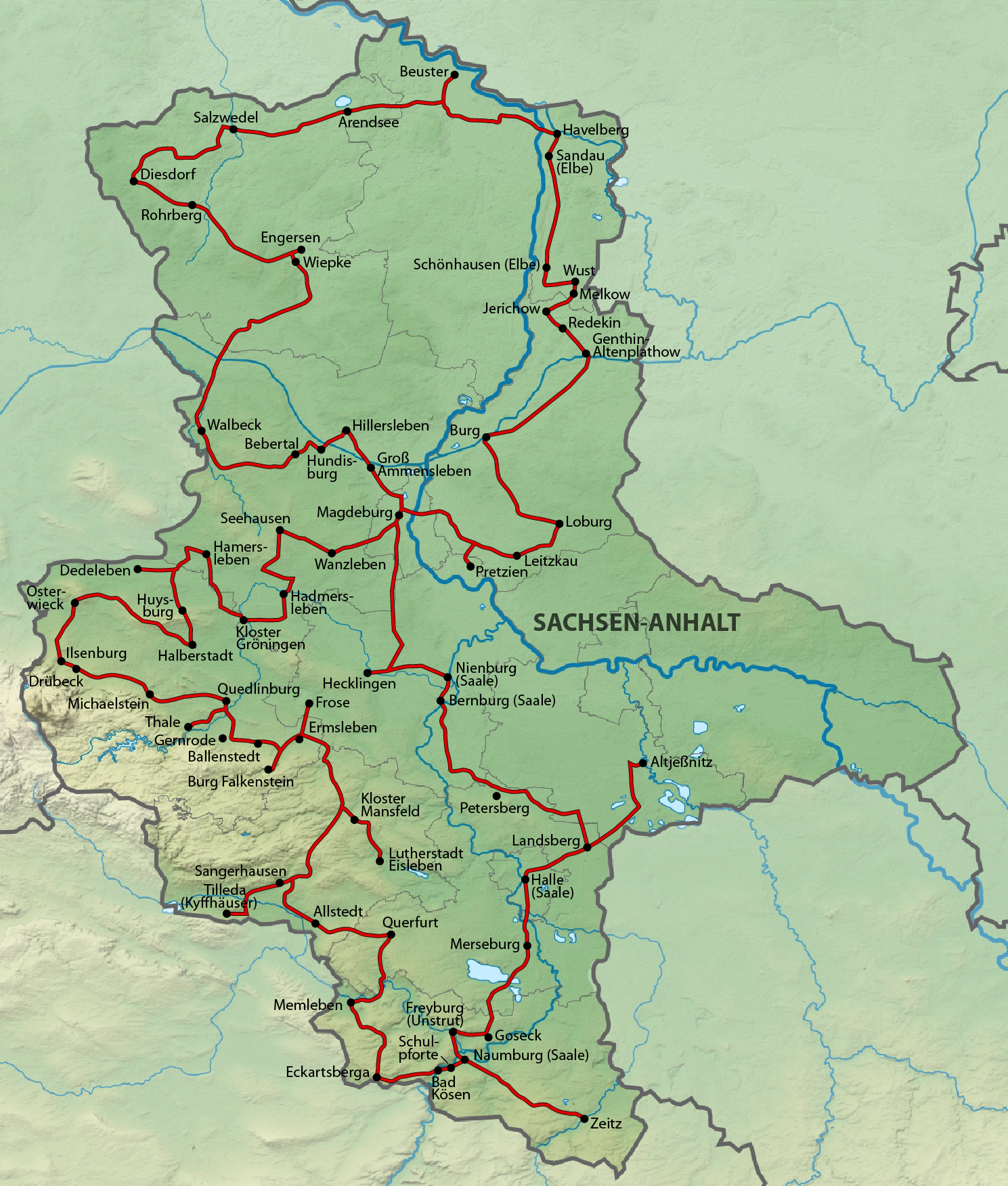
Route

== Route ==
The route takes the form of a figure-of-eight, with a northern and a southern loop, and the city of Magdeburg as its centre, linking village churches, monasteries, cathedrals and castles built between 950 and 1250 and which therefore represent the emergence of Christianity in this part of Germany. Their Romanesque architecture can be recognised by its angular shapes and the round arches of the windows and doors as shown on the official Romanesque Road signs. As well as the specific Romanesque stops en route, there are other villages and churches to explore.

== Major places of interest ==
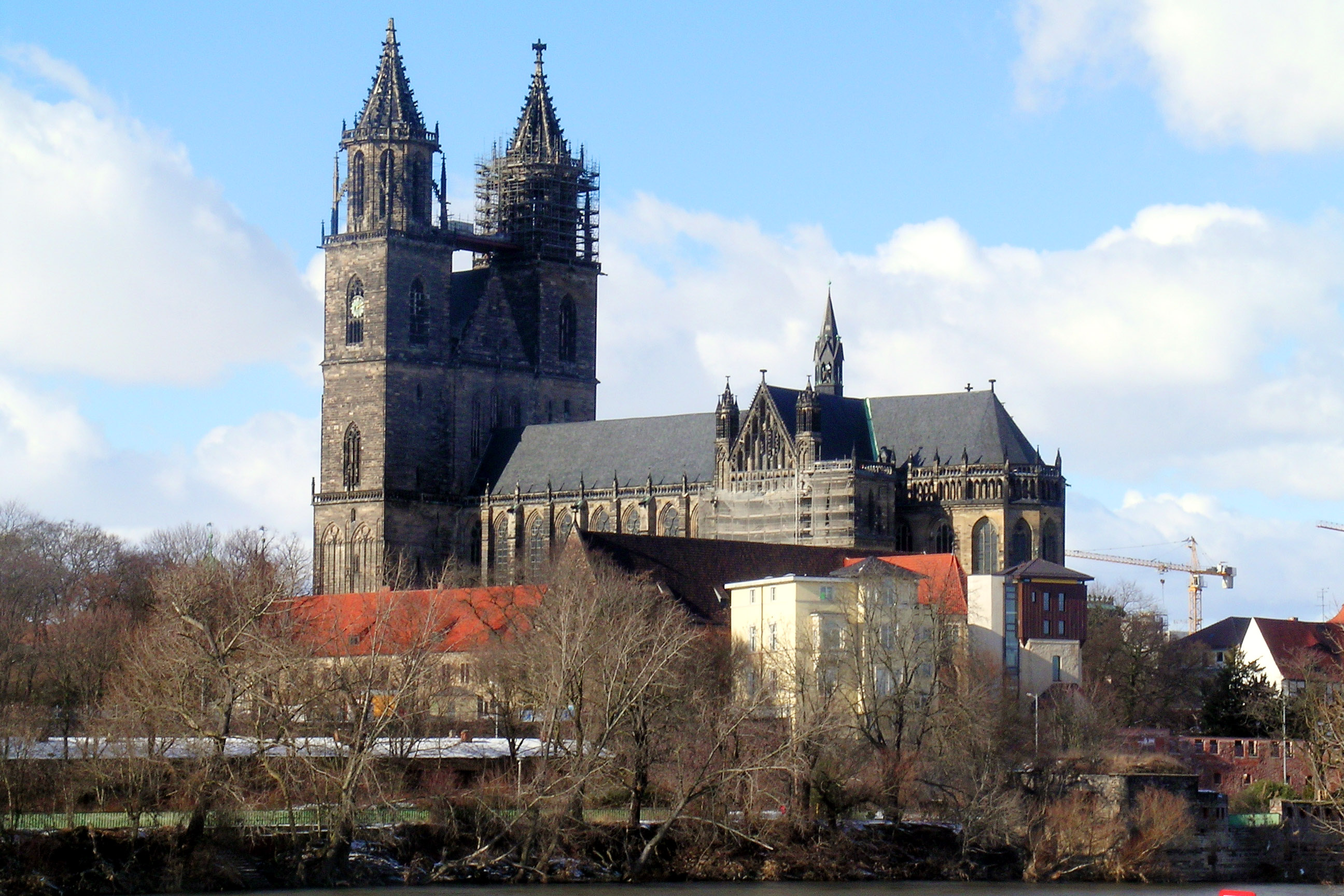
Magdeburg Cathedral

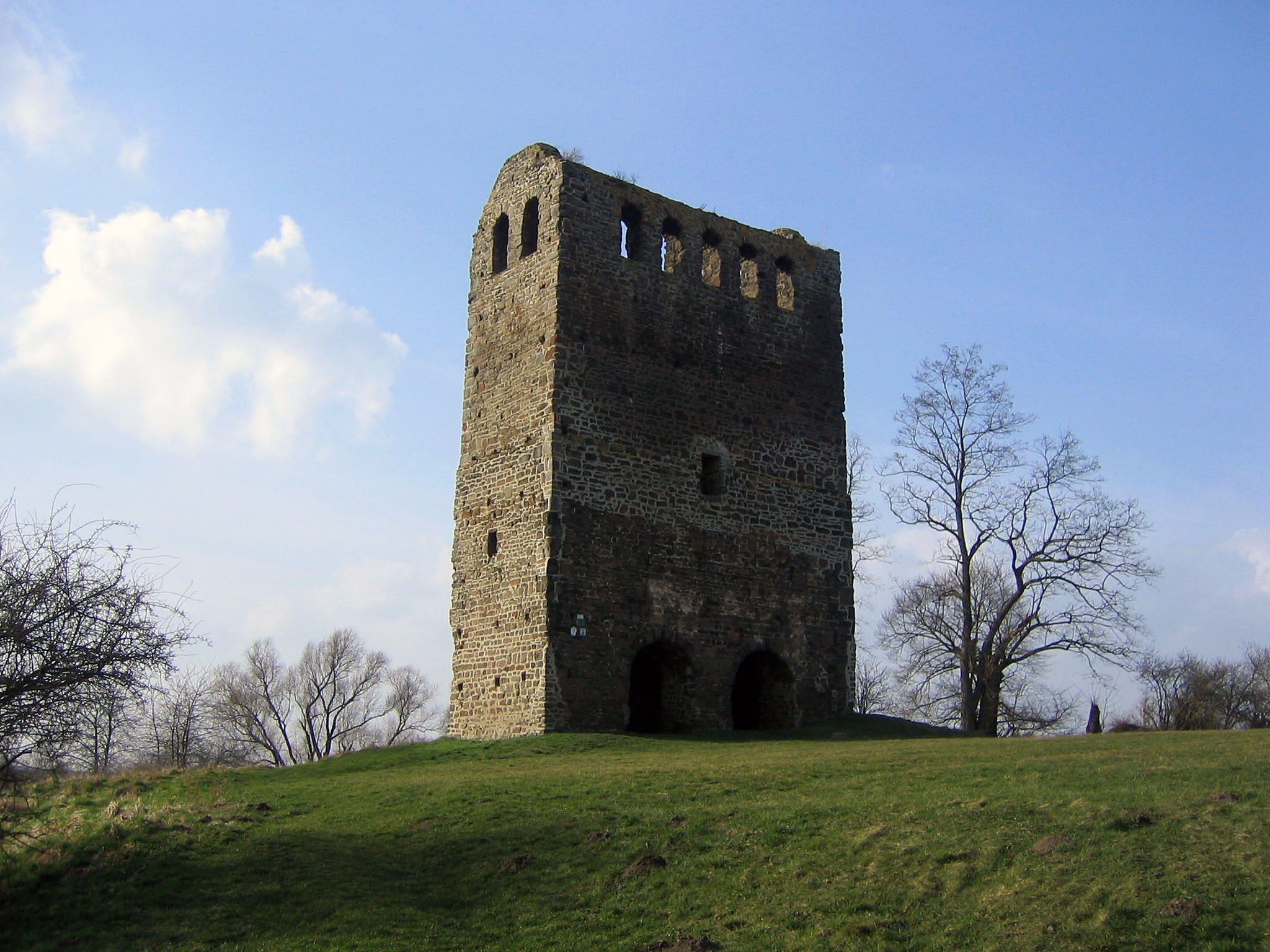
Haldensleben: Nordhusen Church ruin

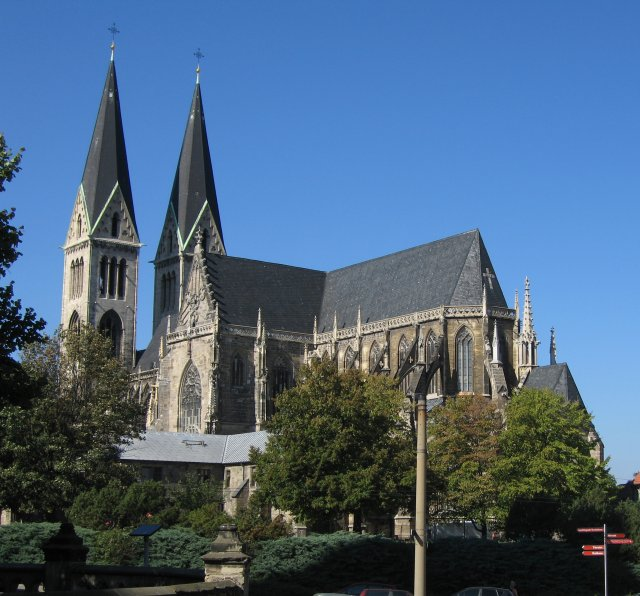
Halberstadt Cathedral

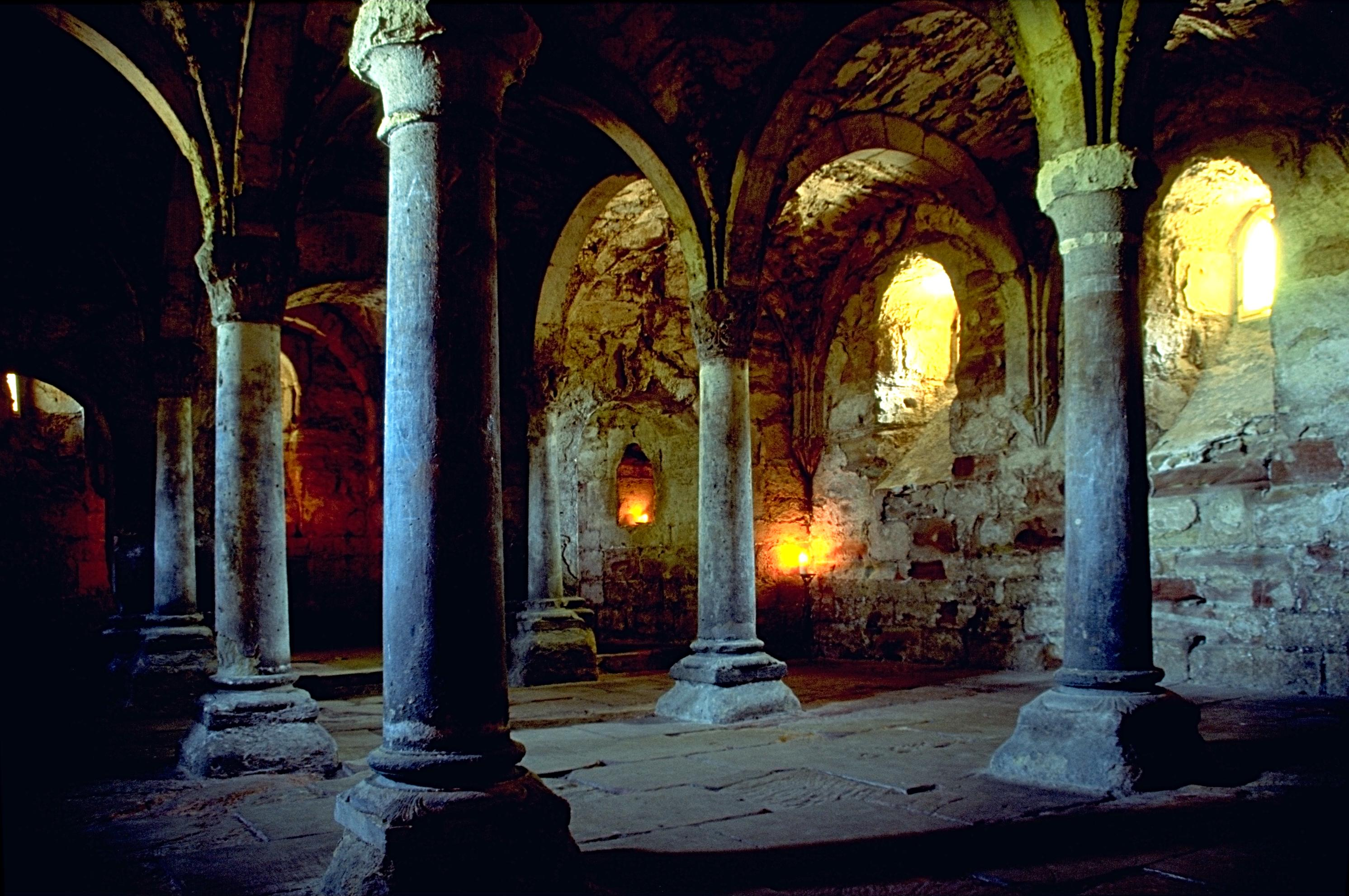
Memleben Abbey, crypt

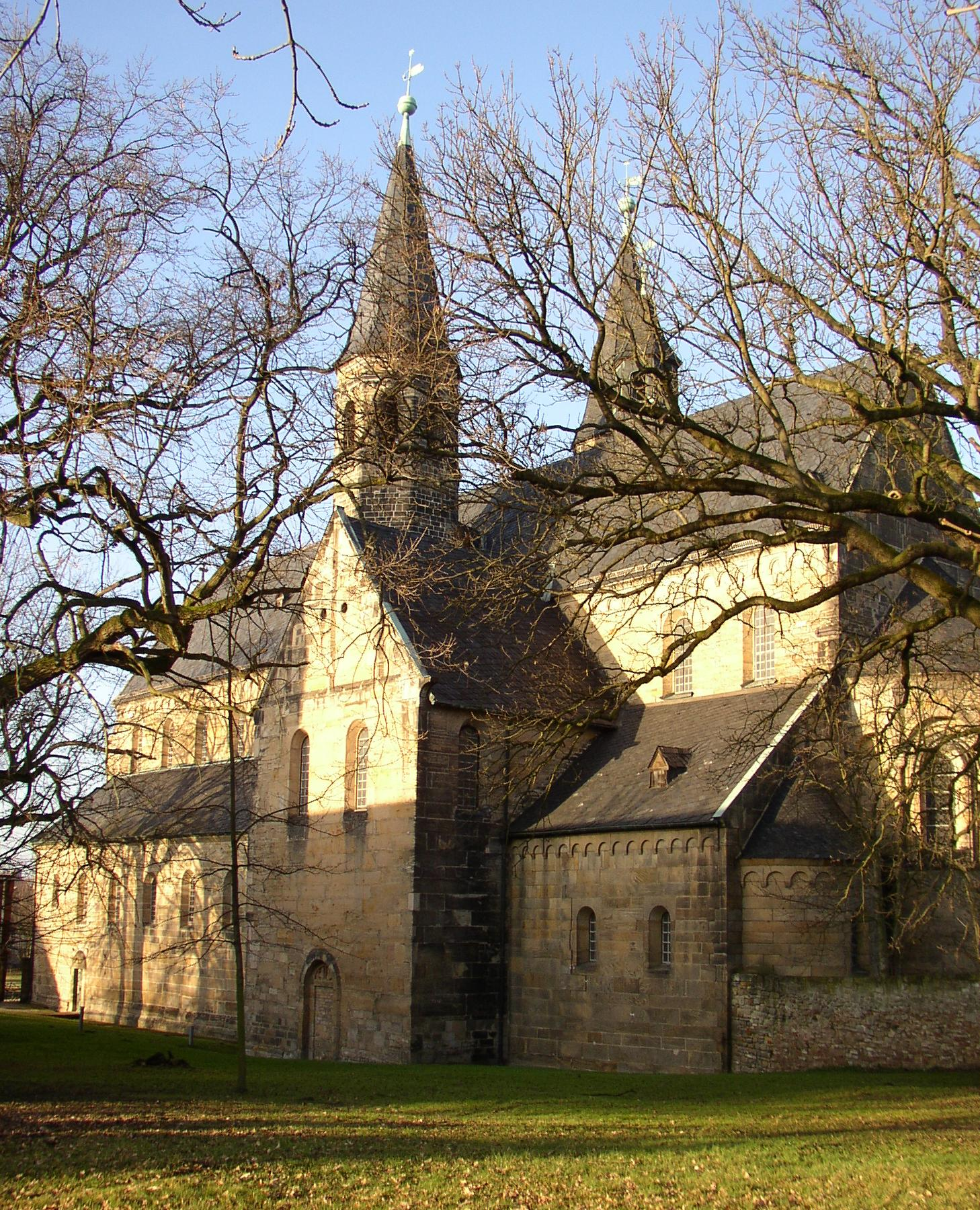
Hamersleben monastery church

=== Magdeburg ===
- Cathedral
- Unser Lieben Frauen monastery
- St Peter's Church
- St Sebastian's Church

=== Northern Route ===
- Niedere Börde, Groß Ammensleben Benedictine abbey
- Hillersleben Abbey
- Haldensleben, Hundisburg Castle, Nordhusen Church
- Bebertal cemetery chapel
- Walbeck, Börde monastery church
- Wiepke, village church
- Engersen, village church
- Rohrberg, village church
- Diesdorf, monastery church
- Salzwedel, St Lawrence's Church
- Arendsee, Benedictine abbey
- Beuster, monastery church
- Havelberg, cathedral
- Sandau St Nicolas' Church
- Schönhausen, village church
- Wust, village church
- Melkow, village church
- Wulkow, village church
- Jerichow Monastery, collegiate church
- Redekin, village church
- Genthin, Altenplathow church
- Burg Unser Lieben Frauen church, St Nicolas' church
- Loburg Unser Lieben Frauen church
- Gommern-Leitzkau, St Peter's church, St Mary's monastery church
- Pretzien, St Thomas' church (1140)

=== Southern Route ===
- Wanzleben Castle
- Seehausen, Börde, St Peter and Paul church
- Hadmersleben Abbey
- Gröningen monastery church
- Am Großen Bruch, Hamersleben monastery church
- Huy-Dedeleben, Westerburg water castle
- Huysburg Benedictine abbey
- Halberstadt, cathedral, Liebfrauenkirche
- Osterwieck, St Stephan's church
- Ilsenburg Benedictine abbey
- Drübeck Benedictine abbey
- Blankenburg am Harz, Michaelstein Abbey
- Quedlinburg, St Servatius' church, St Wigbert's church
- Gernrode, Saint Cyriakus church
- Ballenstedt Benedictine abbey
- Falkenstein Castle
- Frose monastery church
- Ermsleben monastery church (Konradsburg)
- Klostermansfeld Benedictine abbey
- Eisleben, Helfta Abbey
- ~~Seeburg Castle~~ (Temporarily removed in 2017 due to inaccessibility for the visitors)
- Sangerhausen, St Ulric's church
- Tilleda Kaiserpfalz
- Allstedt Castle
- Querfurt Castle
- Memleben Abbey
- Eckartsberga, Eckartsburg
- Bad Kösen, Romanesque House, Saaleck Castle, Rudelsburg, Pforta monastery
- Naumburg, cathedral, curia
- Goseck Castle
- Zeitz, cathedral
- Freyburg, Neuenburg Castle and St Mary's church
- Merseburg, cathedral, St Thomas' church
- Halle, Burg Giebichenstein, Böllberg village church
- Landsberg Castle
- Petersberg St Peter's church
- Bernburg, castle, St Stephan's church at Waldau
- Nienburg Abbey
- Hecklingen Benedictine abbey

As an incentive to raise the profile and support the economy along the Romanesque Road in the Saxony-Anhalt region there is an annual competition for the 'Romanesque Prize', worth €10,000.

== See also ==
- List of regional characteristics of Romanesque churches
- Romanesque art
- Route Romane d'Alsace
