= Eisenbahn Kurier =

- Editor: Thomas Frister
- Categories: Eisenbahnzeitschrift
- Frequency: Monthly
- Circulation: 40,000
- Publisher: EK-Verlag GmbH
- Founded: 1966
- Language: German
- Website: www.eisenbahn-kurier.de
- ISSN: 0170-5288

Eisenbahn Kurier (German for Railway Courier), or EK, is a monthly magazine published in Freiburg, Germany, whose focus is on railway and model railway themes. Its target audience is railway modellers and model railway fans, as well as railway experts and employees. With a monthly print run of about 40,000 copies, EK is one of the biggest railway magazines in Germany. The magazine is produced by its own publisher, EK Verlag, which is registered in the Freiburg Trade Register. Its manager is Dierk Lawrenz, Handeloh.

== History ==
Eisenbahn Kurier was founded in 1966 in Wuppertal by a small group of railway fans, which included the famous locomotive photographer Carl Bellingrodt. Its declared aim was to publish a magazine in which information about the remaining, operational Deutsche Bundesbahn steam locomotives was reported. Whilst there were already several hobby magazines at that time which had a railway theme, there were few up to date reports on the prototype or they were only cursorily mentioned. Today EK still has a heavy emphasis on current railway events. Bellingrodt later bequeathed a large part of his photographic archive to EK, which still publishes them on a regular basis today.

EK attracted further attention in 1972 when it purchased an operational steam locomotive, number 24 009 from East Germany, which became the foundation for the activities of the company "directly on the tracks". The oldest still operational dining car in Germany (1700D) and the Prussian crown prince's coach are amongst its other purchases.

In 1981 the magazine began covering the subject of railway modelling in the magazine, which now appeared monthly. In 1976 the first specialist and photo books were published by EK Verlag. When EK first covered model railway topics they were very much a peripheral theme, but over the course of the year they have increasingly taken more and more space in the magazine.

From 1990 to 1994 a slightly different parallel edition of EK was produced specially for the new German federal states from the old East Germany. Its content varied little from the western edition, but it was cheaper. Following the founding of Deutsche Bahn, this concept was dropped.

Since 1966 many railway books have been published by Eisenbahn Kurier alongside the magazine, including books on individual German locomotive classes. In addition, there are also picture series and books on regional railway subjects in their range of publications, as well as DVDs, videos and numerous special magazine editions on historic and current railway topics in the Eisenbahn Kurier Special, EK Themen and EK Aspekte series. Besides Eisenbahn Kurier the EK Verlag also publishes the Modellbahn Kurier magazine (purely for modellers; OCLC 85516290) as well as Stadtverkehr (meaning Urban Transit and concerning city transport, such as trams, buses and metro systems; ISSN 0038-9013).

== See also ==
List of magazines in Germany
