= George William Ziemann =

German Christian missionary

- Born: November 1806 or 1809; Gross-Wudicke, Saxony
- Died: December 26, 1881 (aged 72 or 75)
- Occupation: Christian Missionary
- Years active: 1843–1881
- Known for: Establishment of the Ghazipore Mission in India
- Spouse: Friedericke Wiese
- Children: 3 adopted (known)

George William Ziemann (November 1806 or 1809 – December 26, 1881) was a German Christian missionary known for successfully establishing and running the Ghazipore Mission in India. He also did missionary work in many other parts of India for nearly 40 years, including Chupráh, Muzafferpore and Buxar, where he was able to spread Christian ideals to locals.

== Early life (1809–1838) ==
One source says that Ziemann was born on November 27, 1809. Another source states that his date of birth is November 22, 1806. Ziemann was born in Gross-Wudicke in the German state Saxony in a village near the town of Rathenow, the third among seven children. His family lived on a house on a farm. In the winter, he went to the village-school and when summer came around, he helped with work on his family's farm.

Ziemann grew up in a religious family with regular church attendance and prayer at meals and other parts of the day. Ziemann got his religious influence from his paternal aunt who joined the Moravian brethren and the sisterhood at Niesky. He often referred to her.

In Ziemann's twenties, he was called for conscription and was in the infantry to serve in Magdeburg for three years. He was promoted to work at the commissariat. His father died around this time and when he returned from his army duties, he took possession of his parents' house and property where he settled in 1836.

That same year on September 25, Ziemann married Miss Friedericke Wiese. In 1838, her brother died so she and Ziemann went to live with her parents at Zabakuk and he sold his family property.

== Call to missionary service (1840–1843) ==
In 1840 in Zabakuk, a theologian named Pastor Wrede began tutoring Ziemann. this tutoring encouraged him to become a missionary. He went to Berlin and met with Pastor Gossner to ask him to be sent to India to do mission work, after hesitation, Gossner gave permission. Mrs. Ziemann originally said no to accompanying her husband to India, but ended up joining him.

Ziemann was blessed in front of the congregation on September 5, 1842, before he left for India. It was during this event of Ziemann that he gave a sermon on Jesus turning water into wine.

Ziemann was the leader of his six-person group and they left Berlin on September 7, 1842. Their journey consisted of going to Hamburg by Postchaise, taking a steamer to Hull and a train to Liverpool, arriving there on September 14, 1842. They left Liverpool on November 23 and arrived in Calcutta, India on April 8, 1843.

== Missionary work (1843–1881) ==
=== Early career (1843–1855) ===
Ziemann did missionary work from 1843–1855 in Chupráh, Muzafferpore and Buxar.

==== Chupráh, Nágpúr and language acquisition (1843–1848) ====
On April 22, 1843, Ziemann and his team left Calcutta for Patná and arrived on June 2. They reached Chupráh on June 9, where Ziemann learned the Hindustání language. In August, he went to Benares to visit his financial supporter Sir Donald McLeod, a supporter of other missionaries in Central India.

On February 8, 1844, he left Chupráh to go to Central India. Ziemann and his group arrived in Nágpúr on March 27. Throughout this trip, he preached in Hindustání to locals and gave out Bible sections. He also learned the Mahrathí language there and preached to public audiences daily from 6 am-12 pm and sometimes, locals would throw mud and cow-dung at him. He was forbidden from preaching in October and therefore left Nágpúr on November 1, arriving back at Chupráh in January 1845, where he studied the local language, preached, visited village-schools and spent time with orphans.

==== Muzafferpore (1848–1851) ====
From March 11, 1848, to January 5, 1851, Ziemann was sent to Muzafferpore for more missionary work, where some locals were baptized. Ziemann made the new Christians stay in their own villages instead of living around the missionaries so as to decrease dependency on the missionaries, even though it was tradition to keep the converts around the missionaries. However, he would visit them, bring them their wives and help them however they needed it.

In November 1849, Ziemann was sent to control the Arráh Mission, where he got cholera on his first night there. After recovering, he later returned to Muzafferpore.

On February 5, 1851, Ziemann returned to the Chupráh Mission. At this point, he and his wife have two adopted native children.

==== Buxar (1852–1855) ====
On March 18, 1852, Ziemann went to the Buxar Mission, now with three adopted children. Under his orders, the school house was repaired and attended by 75 boys. After getting permission to use the English Church, he held services there. It was in Buxar when Ziemann decided to establish a mission in Ghazipore.

Other practical work that Ziemann did is when he sold religious books at a month-long fair to the locals in Bullia in the Ghazipore district for ten rupees ten annas. The missionaries did this to save their books from being destroyed and to give value to the natives, who ended up listening and buying the books.

=== Later career (1855–1881) ===
==== Ghazipore Mission (1855–1881) ====
Ziemann established the Ghazipore Mission in March 1855. Ghazipore is in the North-West Provinces of India. The mission was established on the Ganges river. He had already been there on his preaching tours. Ziemann took control and reopened the mission for Gossner's Missionary Society. In 1844, three missionaries of this society had previously started a mission in Ghazipore but it was soon terminated.

By 1880, Ziemann established a church there with 642 churchgoers. From 1871-1880, foreign missionaries increased from 9 to 21 and there were over 29 000 native Christians. The missionaries would preach, give out religious texts and feed the hungry. The population served was primarily Koeri. Ziemann worked with another missionary named Höppner. Ziemann's wife took care of local orphans. From this mission, Ziemann maintained several outlying mission locations in including Gonda where he served ion an itinerant basis until the Methodist Episcopal Church in India opened a mission there in January 1865.

"The Annual Report of the German Mission in Ghazeepore" from 1869 reveals the names of the many donors who supported this mission. It also gives a report on divine service, keeps track of the baptisms and orphans, as well as information on the schools and preaching. This mission was called economical and was financially supported by Europeans. Ziemann settled permanently in Ghazipore in March 1855.

== Return to Germany and back to India and legacy ==
Ziemann took a leave of absence for health reasons in February 1875 to Germany. On his way there, he visited Palestine and Jerusalem for religious purposes. He returned to India at the end of 1875. George William Ziemann died on December 26, 1881, in Ghazipore. His death was reported to be mourned in India, England and Germany.

Despite Ziemann's successful missionary work, theologian Julius Richter claims that he could also provide an example of what not to do. Ziemann would travel far to preach in many different parts of India, which was universal at the time but changed because it takes time to instill Christian ideas in others' minds with their different values and ideas.
