= Jerichow =

- Town
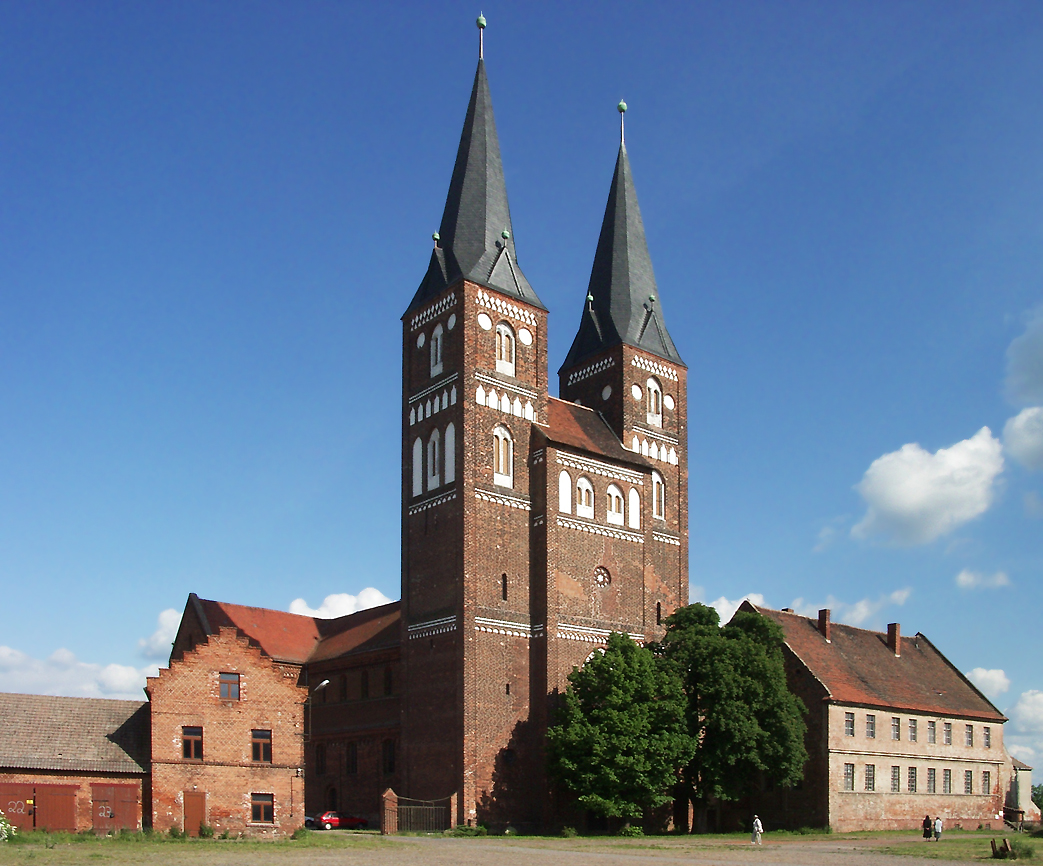
- Jerichow Monastery

- Coat of arms

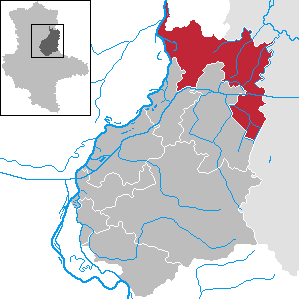
- Location of Jerichow within Jerichower Land district
- Interactive map of Jerichow
- Location within Germany Location within Saxony-Anhalt
- Coordinates: 52°29′N 12°1′E
- Country: Germany
- State: Saxony-Anhalt
- District: Jerichower Land

Government
  - Mayor (2023–30): Cathleen Lüdicke

Area
  - Total: 269.91 km^{2} (104.21 sq mi)
- Elevation: 34 m (112 ft)

Population (2025-12-31)
  - Total: 6,501
  - Density: 24.09/km^{2} (62.38/sq mi)
- Time zone: UTC+01:00 (CET)
  - Summer (DST): UTC+02:00 (CEST)
- Postal codes: 39307 (Brettin, Demsin, Kade, Karow, Klitsche, Roßdorf, Schlagenthin, Zabakuck), 39319 (Jerichow, Nielebock, Redekin, Wulkow)
- Dialling codes: 03933, 039341, 039343, 039347, 039348
- Vehicle registration: JL
- Website: www.stadt-jerichow.de

Jerichow (German pronunciation: [ˈjeːʁɪço]) is a town on the east side of the river Elbe, in the District of Jerichower Land, of the state of Saxony-Anhalt in Germany. With about 270 square kilometres (100 sq mi), the municipality of Jerichow is one of the largest municipalities in area size in Germany.

== Geography ==
The city of Jerichow lies on an old branch of the river Elbe between Stendal and Genthin, 31 miles (50 kilometers) northeast of Magdeburg. The territory of the municipality extends from the center of the city to the east along the northern boundary of the District of Jerichower Land to the state boundary of Brandenburg and from there a strip of land to the south.

=== Divisions ===
On 1 January 2010, the municipality (Einheitsgemeinde) of Stadt Jerichow was founded by the merger of the 12 former municipalities that had until then formed part of the Municipal Association (Verwaltungsgemeinschaft) of Elbe-Stremme-Fiener. The 12 former municipalities became Ortschaften or municipal divisions of the town Jerichow. These Ortschaften are composed of several Ortsteile (local parts):

- Brettin (Annenhof, Brettin)
- Demsin (Großdemsin, Kleindemsin, Kleinwusterwitz)
- Jerichow (Jerichow, Klein-Mangelsdorf, Klietznick, Mangelsdorf, Steinitz)
- Kade (Belicke, Kade, Kader Schleuse, Neubuchholz)
- Karow
- Klitsche (Altenklitsche, Neuenklitsche)
- Nielebock (Nielebock, Seedorf)
- Redekin (Neuredekin, Redekin, Scharteucke)
- Roßdorf
- Schlagenthin (Kuxwinkel, Schlagenthin)
- Wulkow (Altbellin, Blockdamm, Großwulkow, Havemark, Hohenbellin, Kleinwulkow)
- Zabakuck (Güssow, Zabakuck)

Mangelsdorf had already merged with Jerichow on 6 August 2002.

== Climate ==
With the annual precipitation of 530 mm, Jerichow has one of the lowest amounts recorded in Germany. At seven percent the weather stations of the Deutscher Wetterdienst (German Weather Service) were registering low numbers. The driest month is February, with most of the rainfall coming in June. In June, the amount of rain is twice the total for February.

== History ==
Jerichow is not named after a Jericho in the Holy Bible of the Christians. Jerichow was actually an Old Slavic word meaning, "riverside settlement of the dominant one". There used to be a castle backed by a man-made tributary of the Elbe River, but today only a lump of earth remains with the name of Burgberg (lit. Castle Hill).

Jerichow was mentioned for the first time at the end of 1144 by the documents. The occasion was the foundation of the Jerichow Monastery of the Premonstratensian canons with the donation of Hartwig von Stade, the canon of the Cathedral of Magdeburg (with the confirmation from the Holy Roman Emperor, Conrad III of Germany). In the following year, the Premonstratensian canons came from the Kloster Unser Lieben Frauen (Monastery of the Blessed Virgin Mary) in Magdeburg to settle in the town center but, in 1148, they moved to the present location because of the disturbing bustle of the town's marketplace. They built between 1149 and 1172 the collegiate church as a basilica with three naves as well as the east wing of the cloister. These buildings are considered as important works of the Romanesque brick style, the oldest of its kind east of the Elbe River. They would serve for centuries as the landmark for the surrounding areas.

In the 13th century Jerichow received the city charter (Stadtrecht). In 1336 the town was completely destroyed by the flooding from the Elbe River but it was rebuilt and founded in its present location by a local nobleman, Johann III von Buch. However, its former location is still marked by a deep trench lined with ancient walls of brick. Around 1530, with the Reformation, the Lutheran doctrine took hold of the town and, in 1552, the Monastery was secularized by Hans von Krusemark; a part of the convent's building was reserved for the Elector of Brandenburg's domains. During the Thirty Years War, the Imperial and Swedish armies devastated the village and monastery of Jerichow in 1631. Since 1680, along with the Duchy of Magdeburg, Jerichow belonged to the Electorate of Brandenburg and later the Kingdom of Prussia and to the former Jerichower District. In 1684 and 1685, the Monastery's church was repaired by the order of the Great Elector, Frederick William, to be used as a new Reformed church for the Huguenot refugees.

In 1806, Napoleon and his Grande Armée captured the city of Magdeburg and added to the Kingdom of Westphalia, with his brother Jérôme Bonaparte as the King, but the eastern boundary of the new Kingdom stopped at the Elbe River. Jerichow was on the other side of the Elbe so it remained Prussian for the rest of the French occupation (1806–1814).

From 1853 to 1856, at the request of King Frederick William IV of Prussia, Ferdinand von Quast restored the Monastery Church. Around 1870 the convent building was used as a brewery and a distillery. In the present time, there was an extensive renovation of the Monastery Church with the considerable restoration of the Romanesque appearance.

With a series of administrative reorganizations, Jerichow remained in the Kingdom of Prussia until 1918, when it became German. At the end of the Napoleonic wars, it was assigned to Landkreis Jerichow II but its district's name was changed in 1952 to Landkreis Genthin and in 1994 to Landkreis Jerichower Land. Jerichow has been a part of the state of Saxony-Anhalt since the 1990 reunification of Germany.

=== Political Administration ===
- 1180–1680 : Holy Roman Empire, Prince-Archbishopric of Magdeburg, (at least since 1588) Amt (District of) Jerichow
- 1680–1701 : Electorate of Brandenburg-Prussia, Province of the Duchy of Magdeburg, Amt Jerichow
- 1701–1816 : Kingdom of Prussia, Province of the Duchy of Magdeburg, Amt Jerichow
- 1816–1918 : Kingdom of Prussia, Province of Saxony, Regierungsbezirk Magdeburg, Kreis (District of) Jerichow II
- 1918–1944 : Germany, Province of Saxony, Regierungsbezirk Magdeburg, Kreis (Landkreis since 1939) Jerichow II
- 1944–1945 : Germany, Province of Magdeburg, Landkreis Jerichow II
- 1945–1949 : (Soviet Occupation) Province of Saxony-Anhalt, Landkreis Jerichow II
- 1949–1952 : German Democratic Republic, State of Saxony-Anhalt, Landkreis Genthin
- 1952–1990 : German Democratic Republic, Bezirk Magdeburg, Landkreis Genthin
- 1990–1994 : Germany, State of Saxony-Anhalt, Regierungsbezirk Magdeburg, Landkreis Jerichow II
- 1994–2004 : Germany, State of Saxony-Anhalt, Regierungsbezirk Magdeburg, Landkreis Jerichower Land
- 2004–present : Germany, State of Saxony-Anhalt, Landkreis Jerichower Land

== Heraldry ==
=== Coat of arms ===
The coat-of-arms of the collective municipality of Stadt Jerichow was approved on 11 May 2011 by the authorities of the Landkreis Jerichower Land.

Blason: "In blue two silver towers with golden tipped and pitched roofs, arched windows, sound holes and ledges, between them a silver nave with a golden roof, with windows and cornices. The towers were accompanied by two golden ears. The golden bottom of the shield is covered with a wavy blue bar."

The coat-of-arms, designed by the municipal heraldist Jörg Mantzsch, presents in the middle the stylized collegiate church of the Jerichow Monastery with a wavy bar at the bottom. The wavy bar symbolizes the Elbe River, which had, from the earliest times, significant importance to the history of the town. Two accompanying ears, each with eleven grains, are the reference to the formerly independent eleven towns that are now united in the Collective Municipality with Jerichow, and to agriculture, their main industry for many centuries.

The colors of the town are white and blue.

Current coat-of-arms of Jerichow

Current coat of arms of the town of Jerichow

Blason: "On the blue field St. George in a silver armor, in his right hand a silver cross-tipped lance, on his left side holding a shield divided in red and silver, with a silver double-towered church in the upper half; on his right side, a golden dragon."

Until 1999 Jerichow did not have an official coat-of-arms but for centuries it had used as its temporary symbol the changing image of St. George in his armor with the lance and the dragon.

From Christian iconography, numerous incarnations of St. George have survived. The earliest seals showed him dressed in a simple robe and standing on the downed and pierced dragon; only in the Middle Ages and then again towards the end of the 19th century, he was transformed into a knight, complete with a set of armor, a helmet, a shield and more. It is assumed that Jerichow's coat-of-arms also underwent another change because, in 1779, it had a different description. In the archives of the Jerichow Monastery, there is a file with the title "Nachrichten von der Stadt Jerichow de Anno 1779" (News from the Town of Jerichow for the Year 1779). In this file, the Mayor answered various questions about the town. The thirty-first question is, "Was die Stadt im Wappen führe?" (What would the town have in the coat-of-arms?); the answer: "Den Ritter St. Georg der den Lindwurm ersticht " – The knight St. George stabbing the dragon.

Old archival documents from 1779:

"In Jerichow ist die Stadtkirche dem Heiligen Georg geweiht; hierin erklärt sich der Zusammenhang zum Wappenbild. Erste bildliche Zeugnisse des Jerichower Wappens zeigen eine recht naturalistische Darstellung mit Beiwerk und in falschen Tinkturen" (In Jerichow the town church is dedicated to St. George, which explains the image on the coat-of-arms. The first visual evidence of Jerichow's coat-of-arms shows a fairly naturalistic representation with accessories and in incorrect tinctures).

The redesign of the coat-of-arms was undertaken in 1999 by the municipal heraldist (Kommunalheraldiker) de:Jörg Mantzsch Jörg Mantzsch.

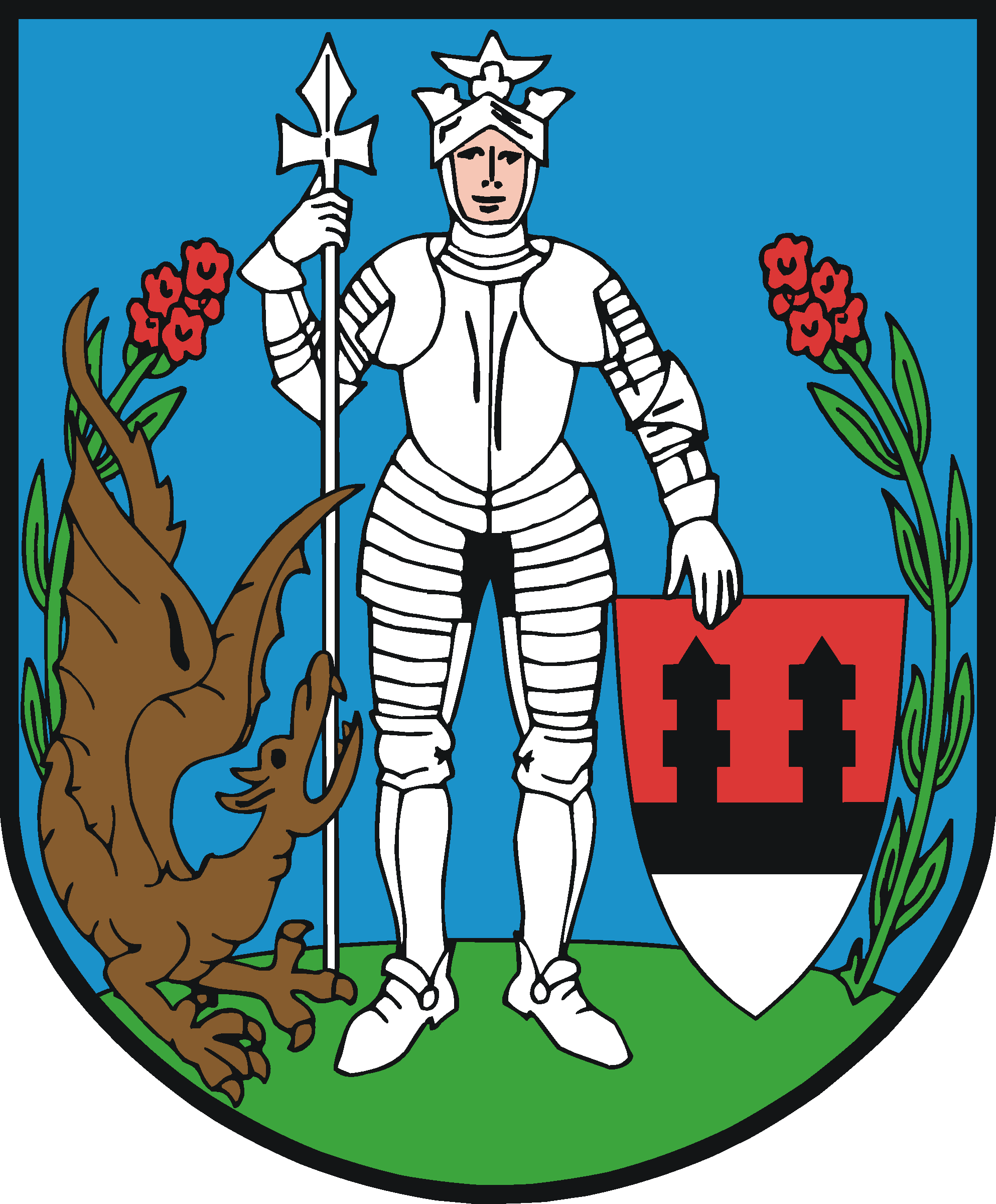
Former coat-of-arms of Jerichow

Former Coat-of-arms of Jerichow

Blason (former coat-of-arms): “In blue on the green ground a knight in silver armor, in his right hand a silver cross-tipped lance, in his left hand a red and silver divided shield with a black fess of twin merlons, on the right side, a snarling brown dragon, on both sides green plants with red petals.”

The coat-of-arms of Jerichow conformed to the common laws. About the connection between the contents of the coat-of-arms, there is not any reliable information. But the fess of merlons in the little shield is meant to symbolize the Premonstratensian collegiate church.

=== Flag ===
The flag of the Collective Municipality of Stadt Jerichos is striped in blue-white-blue (1:4:1) (short form: stripes running horizontally; long form: stripes running vertically) and occupied in the middle by the coat-of-arms of the collective municipality.

=== Flag of the Municipality ===
The flag is striped blue-white-blue and overlaid with the coat-of-arms of Stadt Jerichow.

== Population ==
In 1837, Jerichow was home to 1440 people. It grew to 1500 by 1850, 1841 in 1885, 1605 in 1906, 2720 in 1933 and 3246 in 1939.

== Economy ==
For centuries, agriculture, crafts, breweries and inns were the lifeblood of Jerichow. In 1837, Jerichow had 1,400 residents, a Royal forester and a Royal administrator. Between 1840 and 1850, it was the home of 1,500 residents, including 14 shoemakers, 11 joiners, 11 carpenters, 7 weavers and 8 bakers, and of 7 windmills. In 1894, Jerichow had its own post office as well as a district court. In 1899, a train station was constructed to connect Jerichow with Genthin and Schönhausen.

The Industrial Revolution came in the 19th century, leading to the decline of the crafts as well as the economic importance of Jerichow, but the fortunes of the town were revived in 1899 with the establishment of a provincial hospital in the middle of the nearby pine forest. The hospital, with the additions of a psychiatric ward in 1902 and a tuberculosis sanatorium in 1928, soon became an important employer of the town. Today, after an extensive modernization and expansion in 1991, it operates as an AWO (workers' Welfare) hospital specializing in psychiatry, psychotherapy, neurosciences and psychotherapeutic medicine. In the town, certain agricultural, artistic and small businesses remain. A housing development was built northwest of Jerichow between 1934 and 1938. Since the end of World War II, the businesses, as well as the train station, have become the major partners of the hospital.

== Transport ==
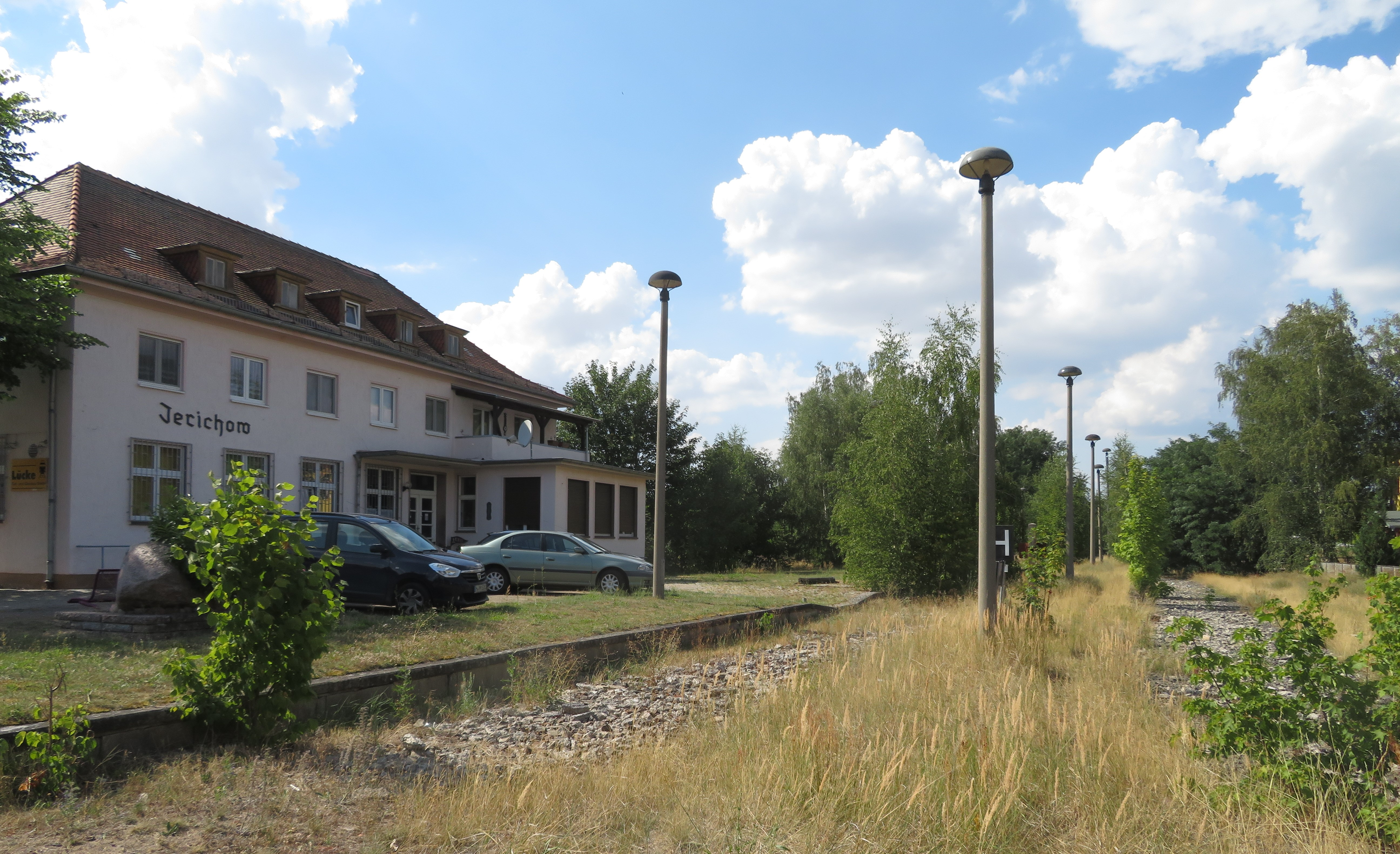
Former train station in Jerichow

Jerichow was the main train station of the branch line of the rail system of Saxony-Anhalt until 1999. The routes to Schönhausen, Genthin and Güsen were built by the Kleinbahn-AG in Genthin. At the same time Jerichow had a maintenance depot for the railcars of the DR-Baureihe VT 2.09 series and their successors.

== Memorials ==
- Monument in the local cemetery for commemorating Fritz Schulenburg, the founder of the local chapter of the Communist Party of Germany (KPD), who was imprisoned at the beginning of the National Socialism years with a hundred others in a basement of the City Hall of Tangermünde and who had endured mistreatment, which caused his death in 1933.
- Monument in the town center for the victims of Fascism
- Memorial, listing the names of approximately 930 victims who were euthanized by the Nazi operation, Action T4, on the grounds of the State Psychiatric Hospital, now the AWO Specialist Hospital

== Attractions ==
- Jerichow Monastery and its church and museum ( with the parish church on the "Straße der Romanik" [ "Romanesque Road" ] )
- Parish church built in the Romanesque style
- Holländermühle [ "Dutch Mill" ], a windmill on the Mühlenberg [ "Mill Mountain" ], near the former train station. The technical structure of the interior is completely preserved. In 1936, the mill was converted to be driven by a motor. By 1960, the wings and their rotating ring in the spire had to be dismantled because they were already in disrepair. After the restoration, the mill got new wings in May 2005.

== Sons and Daughters of the Town ==
- Udo von Tresckow ( 1808–1885 ), Prussian general of infantry who led the Siege of Belfort
- Werner Genest ( 1850–1920 ), engineer and producer of telecommunicating equipment
- Otto Baer ( 1881–1966 ), Mayor of Magdeburg
- Werner Usbeck ( 1881–1947 ), railway engineer and President of the Reichsbahndirektion Halle [ "Imperial Railroad Management of Halle" ]
- Fritz Schulenburg ( 1894–1933 ), Communist and victim of the Nazis
- Sylvester Groth ( * 1958 ), movie actor and tenor singer
- Albert Eiteljörge ( 1864–1941 ), historian who lived in Jerichow since 1902 and who wrote and published books and articles about the history of Jerichow, its Monastery and its surrounding area

== Miscelleanous ==
- In several works of Uwe Johnson, a place called "Jerichow" appears but it is probably based on the village of Klütz in Mecklenburg, which does not have anything in common with the town of the same name in Saxony-Anhalt.
- In 2009, a German movie premiered with the title of Jerichow. Partly based on an American novel The Postman Always Rings Twice, the movie was set in the town of Jerichow but it was actually filmed in the Prignitz and Mecklenburg-Vorpommern.
