= Jerichow Monastery =

Former Premonstratensian monastery

Coordinates: 52°30′08″N 12°00′57″E

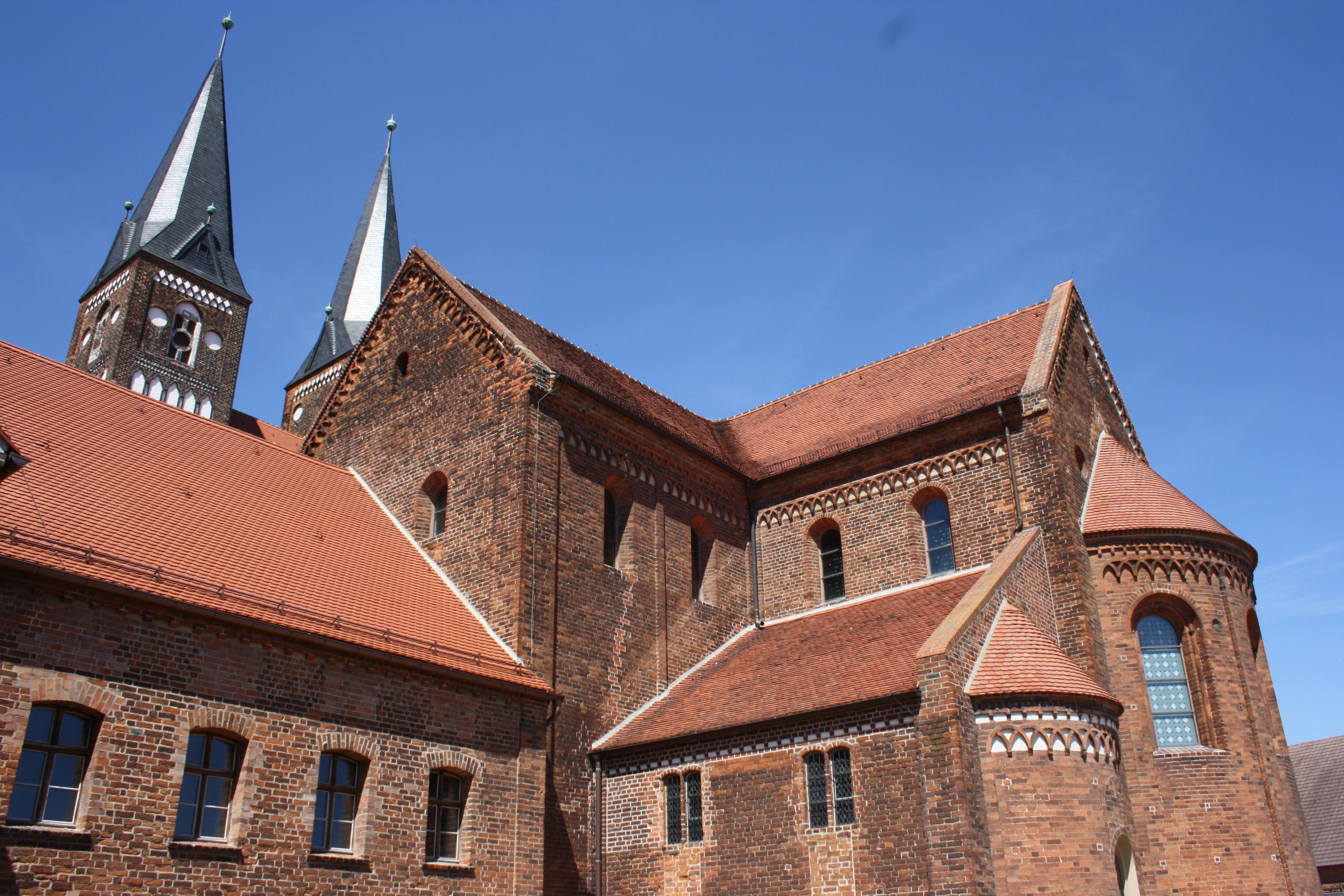
Nave, transept and choir from 1149 to 1172 form a pioneer building of brick architecture in Northern Germany.

Jerichow Monastery, Saxony-Anhalt

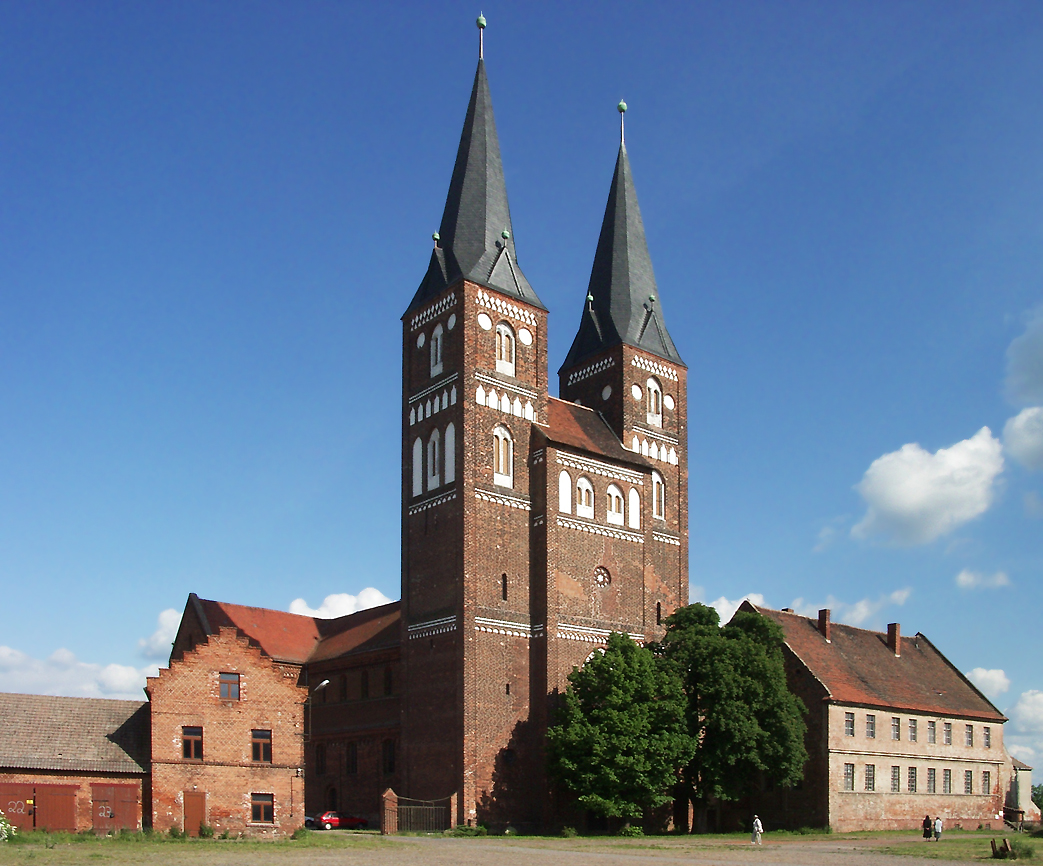
The towers from 1256 to 1262 are Early Gothic.

The Jerichow Monastery (German: Kloster Jerichow) is a former Premonstratensian monastery located in the northern outskirts of Jerichow, near the shores of the Elbe River, in the state of Saxony-Anhalt of Germany.

Founded by the Premonstratensians, it was not a monastery but the Collegiate Church of St. Mary and St. Nicholas. Except of the towers built in the Late Romanesque style, it is one of the oldest brick buildings in northern Germany and a prime example of the Brandenburg style of brick architecture. It is one of the stops of the "Romanesque Road".

== The Collegiate Church ==
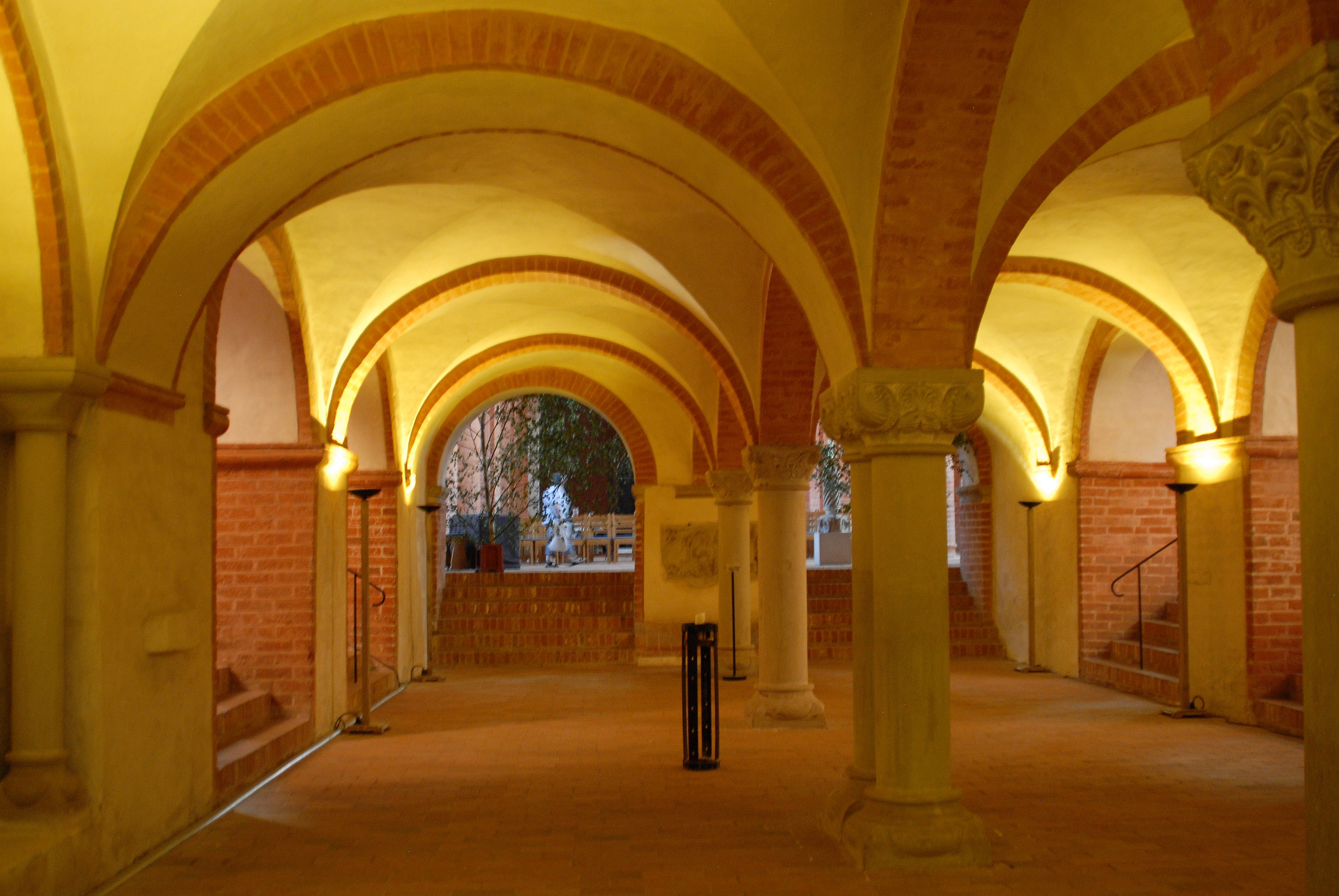
The crypt is not really "hidden"

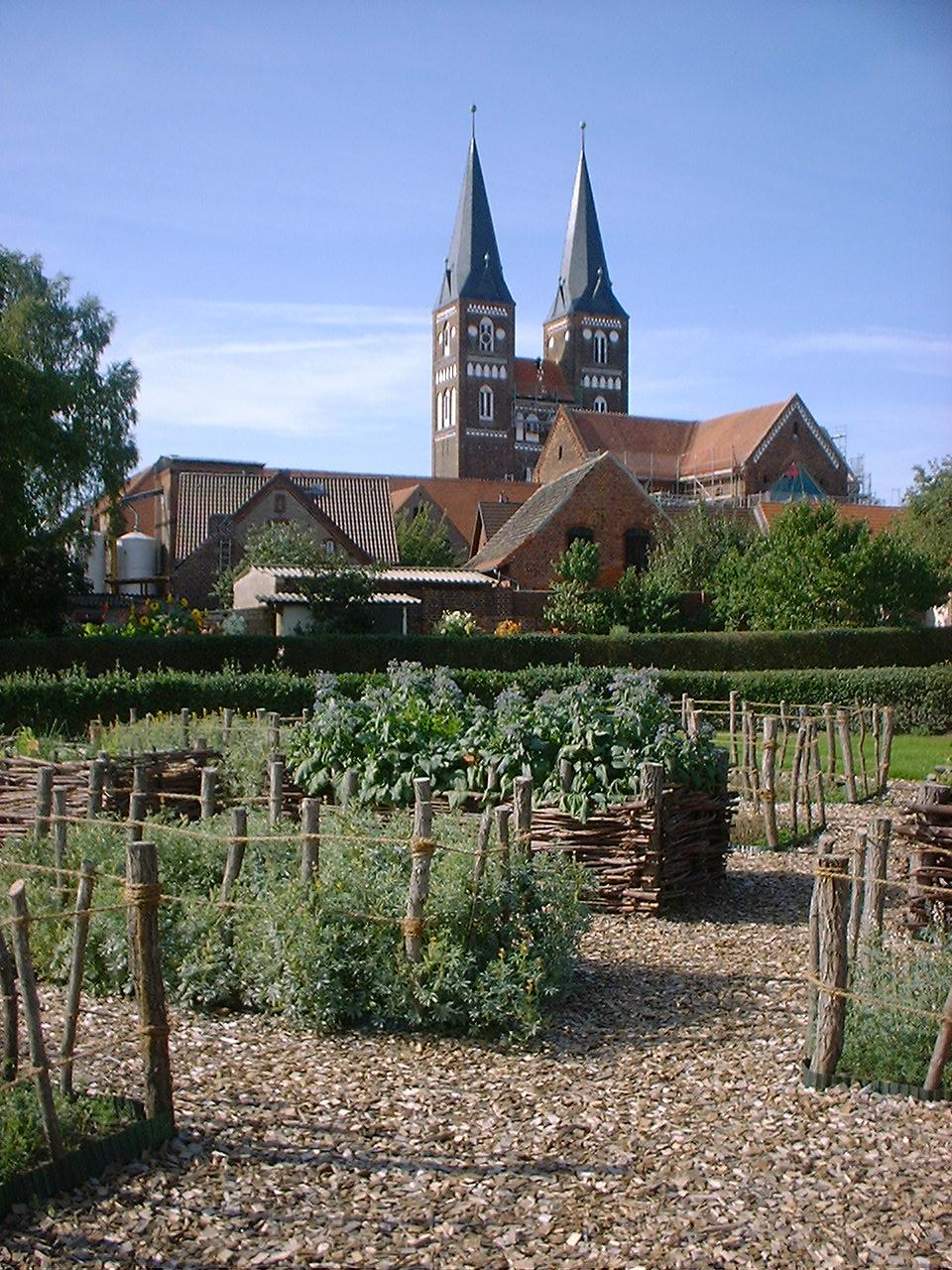
The Monastery and its garden

The Jerichow Monastery may look and feel like a cloister but it was actually a collegiate church with its own dormitory. That is because its founders and original occupiers were canons, not monks. These canons are secular priests who perform mainly pastoral duties, including the missions, and therefore do not live in seclusion. Nevertheless, because of its appearance, Jerichow is commonly mentioned as a monastery. In contrast, the structurally and canonically identical buildings next to the Cathedrals of Magdeburg, Havelberg and Brandenburg an der Havel are not described as monasteries. They are described as collegiate churches (cathedral chapters). In all four cases, they were handled by branches of the Premonstratensian Order, who were not monks but regular canons.

== History ==
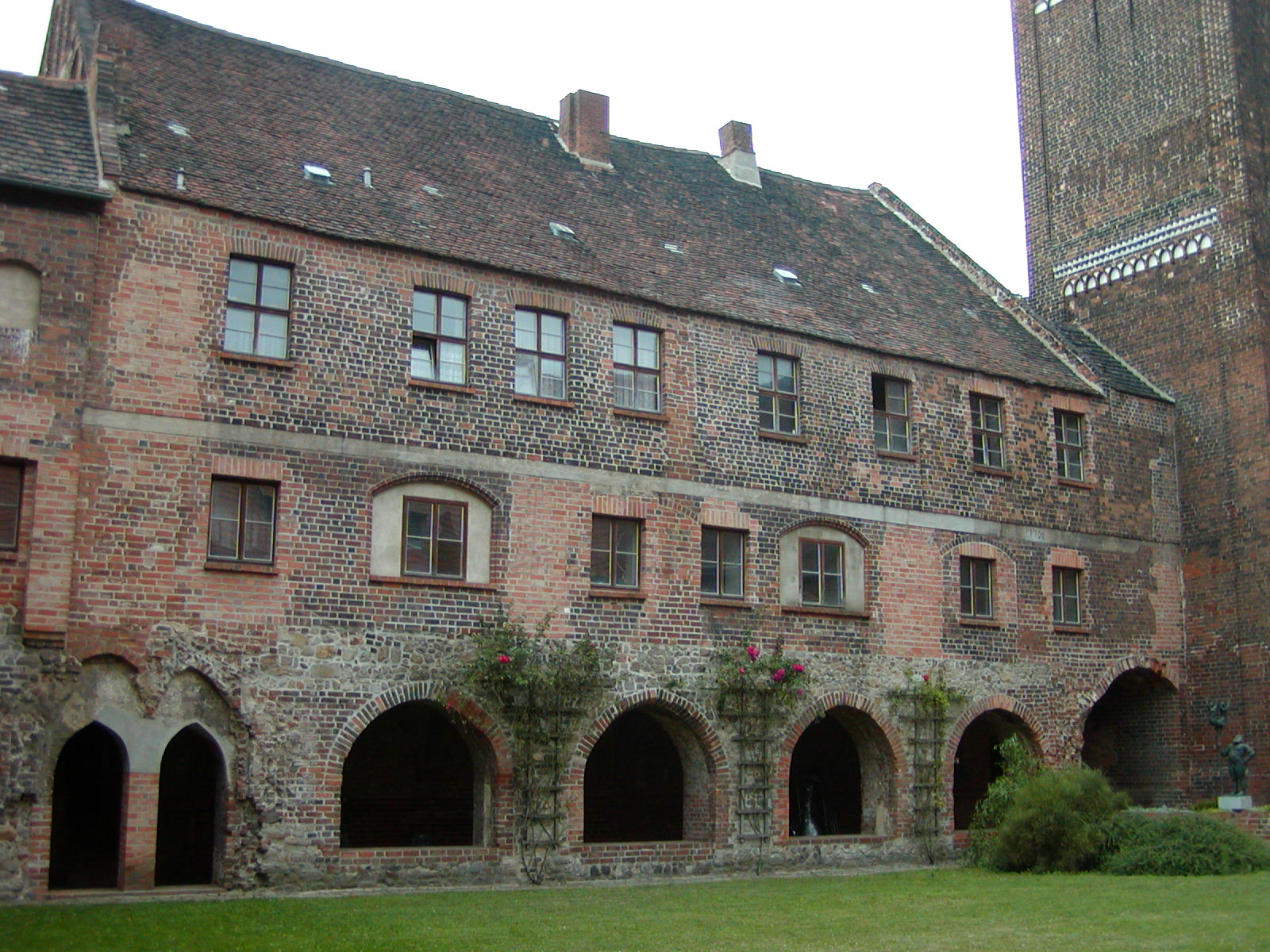
The courtyard of the cloister

=== Construction ===
The monastery was founded in 1144 as an Premonstratensian Abbey by Hartwig von Stade, then canon of the Magdeburg Cathedral and since 1148 Archbishop of Bremen, in the middle of the village of Jerichow and confirmed by the Holy Roman Emperor, Conrad III of Germany. In the following year, it was filled and manned by the Premonstratensian canons from the Our Lady Friary [ "Monastery of the Blessed Virgin Mary" ] in Magdeburg. But, three years later, in 1148, it was moved to its present location, north of Jerichow, as the refuge from the noises of the marketplace in the village. In the next year, the construction of the monastery's church began. It was finished as a basilica with three naves, along with the east wing of the cloister, in 1172 under the third Prince-Bishop of Ratzeburg, Isfrid of Ratzeburg, (1159–1179), who was also a Premonstratensian. The crypt was added between 1180 and 1200 but the monastery itself was expanded with a winter rectory and administrative offices. In 1220 and 1230, respectively, the construction of the summer rectory and the cloister began. The last phase of construction was the addition of the westernmost bay with the towers and the western façade from 1256 to 1262. Due to the advancement of architectural style, except for the western entrance they are no more Romanesque, most windows have pointed arches and typical shapes of Early Gothic.

=== Secularization ===
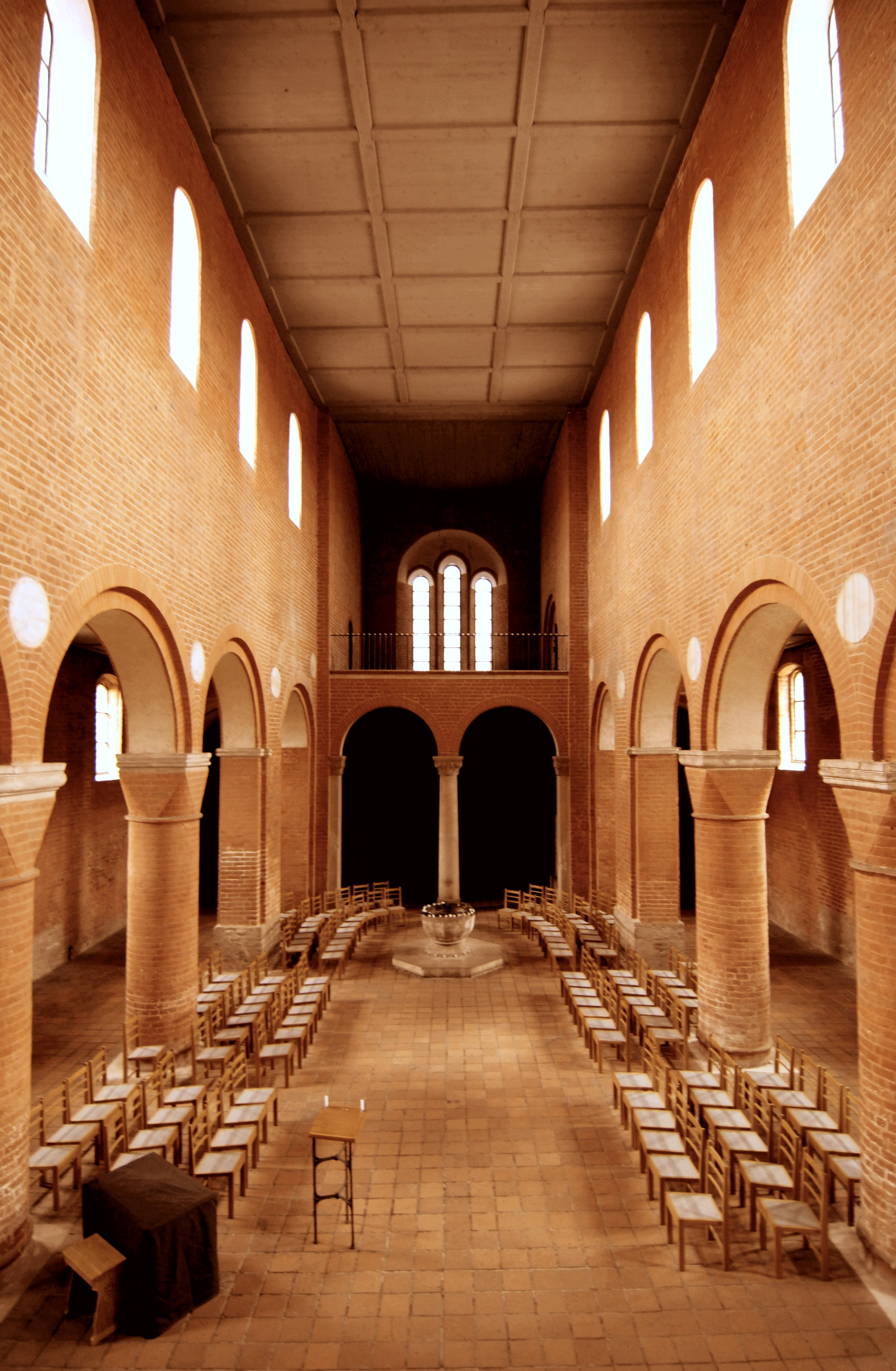
Interior of the church

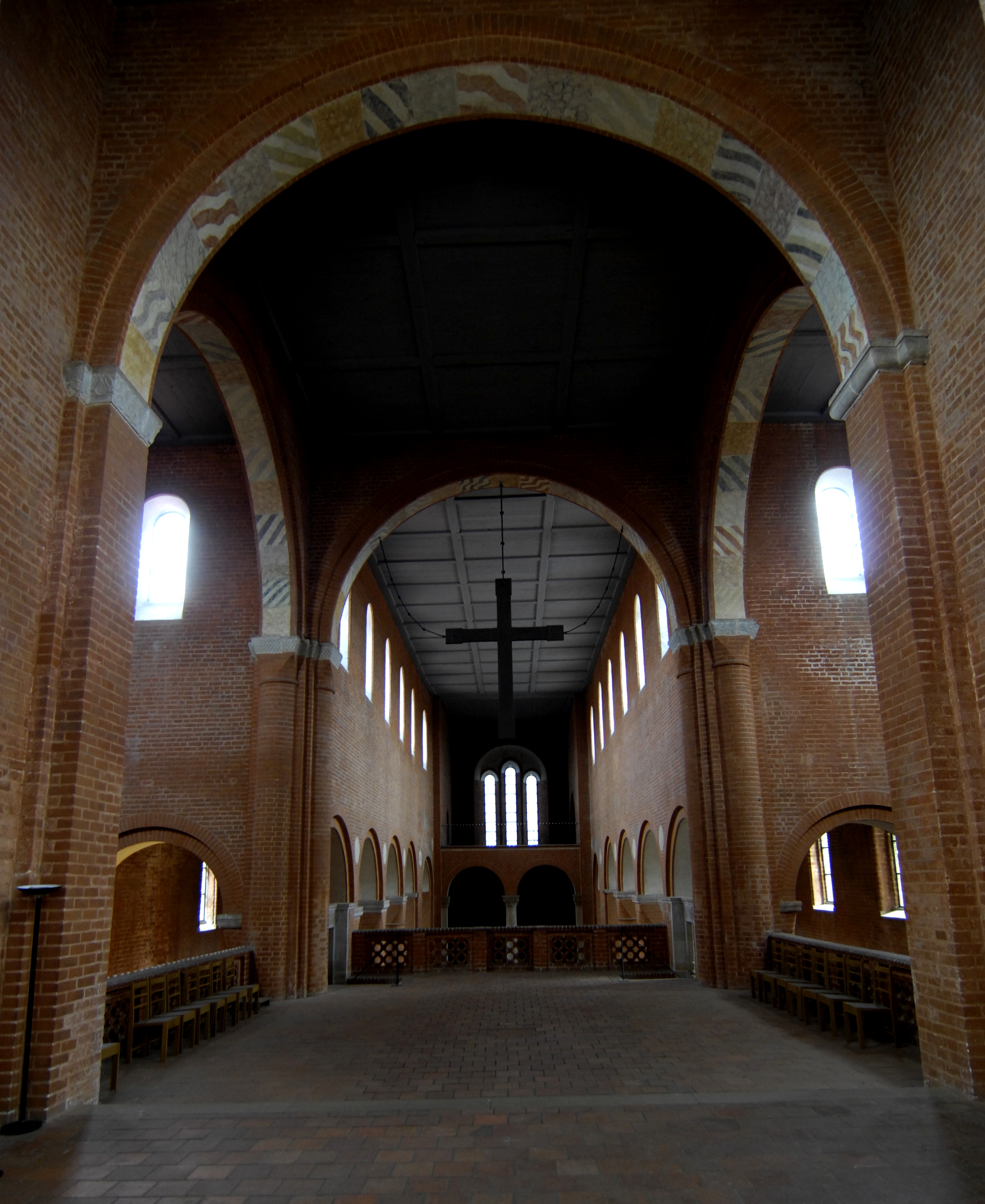
Interior of the church, towards the altar

But, when the Reformation came to Germany, the monastery was secularized in the 16th century and the remaining canons had to leave. During the Thirty Years War, the Imperial and Swedish armies devastated the village and churches of Jerichow, including the monastery, in 1631. In 1680, the whole district of Jerichow went from the Archbishopric of Magdeburg to the Electorate of Brandenburg-Prussia. Under the direction of the Great Elector, Frederick William of Brandenburg, the Collegiate Church was restored in 1685 to be used as a new Reformed church for the Huguenot refugees. But the actual repairs were not made for another two hundred years. Between 1853 and 1856, at the request of King Frederick William IV of Prussia, Ferdinand von Quast restored the monastery and its church.

But the indignities continued for the former Jerichow Monastery. Fourteen years later, around 1870, it was used as a brewery and a distillery. Near the end of World War II, the west front of the church was damaged by the artillery of the American army during the firefight with the German forces. After the war, in 1946, a fire went to the roof in the east and south wings.

=== Restoration ===
During the Communist era, between 1955 and 1960, repairs were made to the monastery, restoring its interiors to the pure Romanesque style. The museum was opened in the west wing in 1977. Although the summer rectory was restored in 1985 and 1986, the damage to the remaining buildings was still severe. So in 1998 the entire complex had to be placed under the protection of the Bauaufsichtsbehörde [ Building Inspection Authority ] and closed as unsafe and unfit. But more repairing and restoring measures in 1999 had the order lifted but they continued for several more years.

On 13 December 2004, the "Stiftung Kloster Jerichow" [ Jerichow Monastery Foundation ] was founded. The founders were the State of Saxony-Anhalt, the Evangelical Church in Central Germany ( EKM ), the District of Jerichower Land, the town of Jerichow, the Protestant parish of Jerichow and the association "Erhaltet Kloster Jerichow e.V." [ Preservation of the Jerichow Monastery, Inc. ]. Under this foundation, the possessions, documents and buildings of the monastery, which had been scattered since the dissolution, were once again consolidated in a single place. The foundation is legally classified as a private foundation.

== Bells ==
The two tower bells are historically significant. The smaller of them, dating from around 1300, was cast in the so-called Zuckerhutrippe. Its inscription mentions the name of its maker. The bells both hang in the wooden belfry with newly installed wooden yokes.

| No. | Name | Casting Year | Caster | Diameter | Weight | Nominal (16tel) |
|---|---|---|---|---|---|---|
| 1 | Osanna | 1354 | unknown | 1473 mm (58 in) / 1476 mm (58 in) | ~2000 kg (4409 lbs) | d^{1} −9 |
| 2 | Zuckerhutglocke | after 1300 | Meister Tamo | 675 mm (26.5 in) | ~250 kg (500 lbs) | g^{2} −2 |

== Bibliography ==
- (in German) Peter Ramm, author, and János Stekovics, photographer, Kloster Jerichow (Wettin-Dößel: Stekovics, 2010), ISBN 978-3899232585
