= Carl Bellingrodt =

German railway photographer

Carl Bellingrodt (1897–1971) was one of the best-known German railway photographers of the 20th century and co-founder of the Federal Association of German Railway Friends (Bundesverband Deutscher Eisenbahn-Freunde) or BDEF. He worked professionally as a police officer, later switching to financial management.

== Life and works as a photographer ==
Bellingrodt was born on 7 April 1897 in Cologne, but began taking photographs even before the First World War. His first surviving photograph was of the German emperor, Kaiser Wilhelm II Very soon he specialised in landscape photography and especially railway photography. In the course of his work he took more than 30,000 photographs of locomotives and trains. His collection suffered heavy losses as the result of a fire and a water pipe leak.

Bellingrodt is known not just for his systematically compiled photographs of individual locomotives and locomotive classes using specific, standard perspectives. Especially loved by railway fans and preferred by Bellingrodt are his photographs of trains in striking country settings, at stations or in station yards. The majority of his shots were taken in black and white; colour photographs by Bellingrodt are rarer. His photographic method, in which the train is crossing the picture diagonally was a style emulated by other railway photographers. Even before the Second World War, Bellingrodt sold photographs to publishing houses. These often acted as pictures for postcards. Bellingrodt also worked as a slide photographer for the Deutsche Reichsbahn.

After Bellingrodt's death on 24 September 1971 in Wuppertal, his archive was extended for several years by his wife until she eventually sold it in 1981 to the Eisenbahn-Kurier magazine. Today the majority of his photographic works, including an almost complete collection of photographs, are in private ownership.

== Importance today ==
Picture books and other publications with his photographs are still avidly purchased today and time and again re-published. The society co-founded by him, the BDEF, is today the largest German association for railway fans with over 12,000 members.

== Literature ==
- Klaus D. Holzborn / Carl Bellingrodt: Dampflokomotiven/Normalspur. Alba Buchverlag, Düsseldorf (1971) 4th edition.
- Müller, Siegfried: Nachruf: Im September 1971 starb Carl Bellingrodt. in: Eisenbahn-Kurier 9/1981, p. 6–17
- Eisenbahnromantik am Rhein – unterwegs mit Carl Bellingrodt. EK-Verlag, Freiburg (2006) ISBN 978-3-88255-291-1
- Eisenbahnraritäten in Farbe – Aus dem Archiv Carl Bellingrodt 1933 bis 1960. EK-Verlag, Freiburg (2001) ISBN 978-3-88255-272-0
- Eisenbahnreise mit Carl Bellingrodt EK-Verlag, Freiburg (2007) ISBN 978-3-88255-300-0
- Ein Leben für die Eisenbahn-Photographie – Carl Bellingrodt und sein berühmtes Lokomotivbild-Archiv. EK-Verlag, Freiburg (2004) ISBN 978-3-88255-289-8
- Eisenbahn-Dampflokomotiven – Aus dem berühmten Bildarchiv von Carl Bellingrodt. EK-Verlag, Freiburg (2001) ISBN 978-3-88255-283-6
- Brinker, Helmut / Ursula Arlowski / Alfred B. Gottwaldt: Meisterfotos aus der großen Eisenbahnzeit − das Lebenswerk von Carl Bellingrodt, dem Altmeister der Eisenbahn-Fotografie. GeraMond, München (2004) ISBN 3-7654-7256-5
- Brinker, Helmut: Carl Bellingrodt - Das fotografische Werk. DGEG-Medien, Hövelhof (2011) ISBN 978-3-937189-60-4
