= Demsin =

- Stadtteil of Jerichow
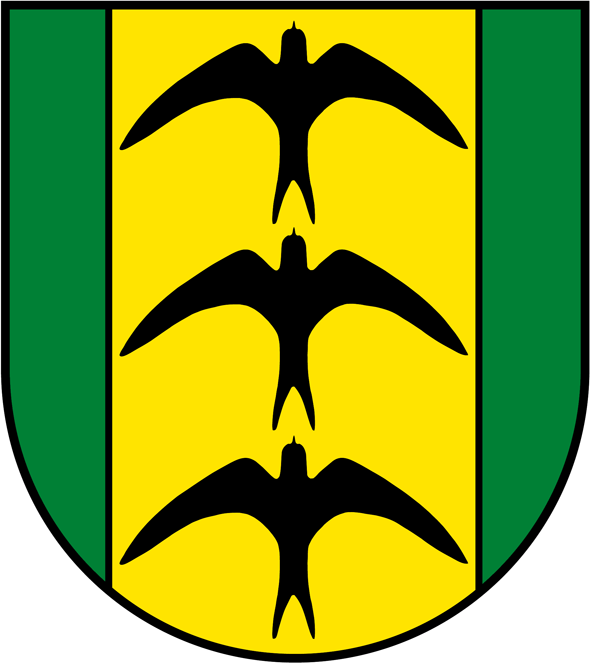
- Coat of arms
- Interactive map of Demsin
- Location within Germany Location within Saxony-Anhalt
- Coordinates: 52°25′58″N 12°15′53″E
- Country: Germany
- State: Saxony-Anhalt
- District: Jerichower Land
- Town: Jerichow

Area
  - Total: 22.35 km^{2} (8.63 sq mi)
- Elevation: 30 m (98 ft)

Population (2006-12-31)
  - Total: 382
  - Density: 17.1/km^{2} (44.3/sq mi)
- Time zone: UTC+01:00 (CET)
  - Summer (DST): UTC+02:00 (CEST)
- Postal codes: 39307
- Dialling codes: 039348
- Vehicle registration: JL

Demsin is a village and a former municipality in the Jerichower Land district, in Saxony-Anhalt, Germany.

Since 1 January 2010, it is part of the town Jerichow.
