= Nielebock =

- Stadtteil of Jerichow
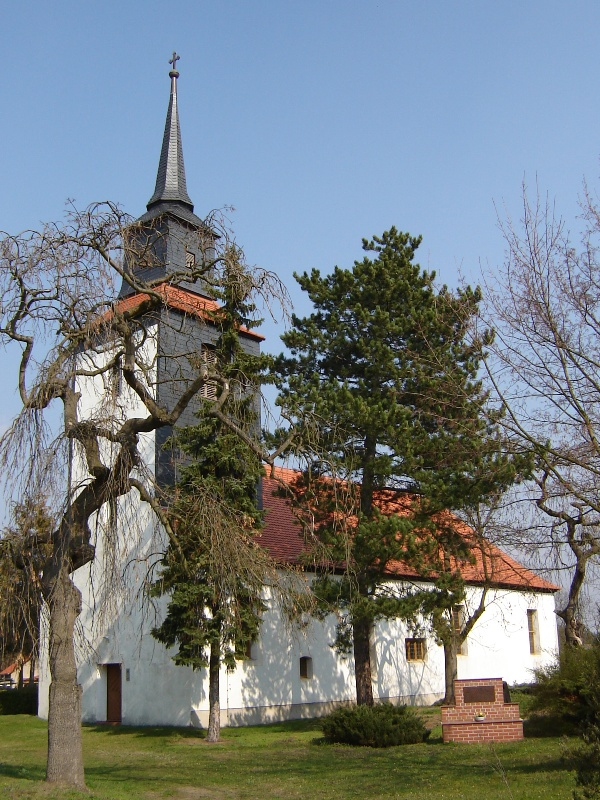
- Protestant church

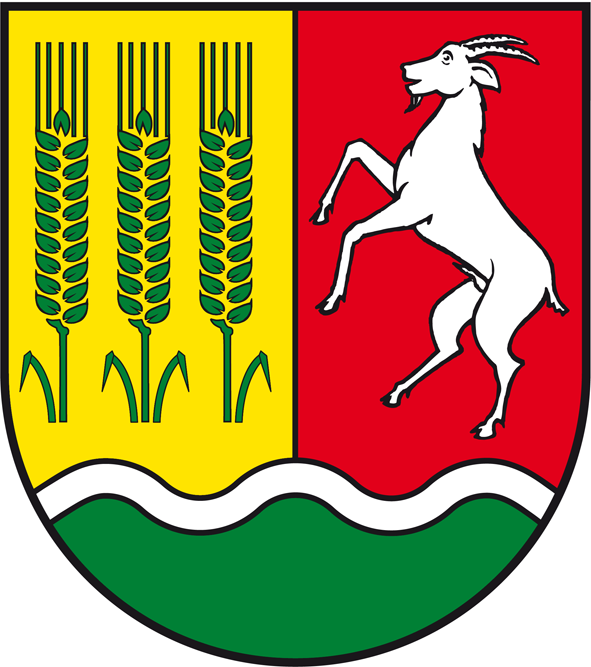
- Coat of arms
- Interactive map of Nielebock
- Location within Germany Location within Saxony-Anhalt
- Coordinates: 52°26′N 12°4′E
- Country: Germany
- State: Saxony-Anhalt
- District: Jerichower Land
- Town: Jerichow

Area
  - Total: 14.95 km^{2} (5.77 sq mi)
- Elevation: 34 m (112 ft)

Population (2006-12-31)
  - Total: 238
  - Density: 15.9/km^{2} (41.2/sq mi)
- Time zone: UTC+01:00 (CET)
  - Summer (DST): UTC+02:00 (CEST)
- Postal codes: 39319
- Dialling codes: 039341
- Vehicle registration: JL

Nielebock is a village and a former municipality in the Jerichower Land district, in Saxony-Anhalt, Germany.

Since 1 January 2010 it has been part of the town Jerichow.
