= Brettin =

- Stadtteil of Jerichow
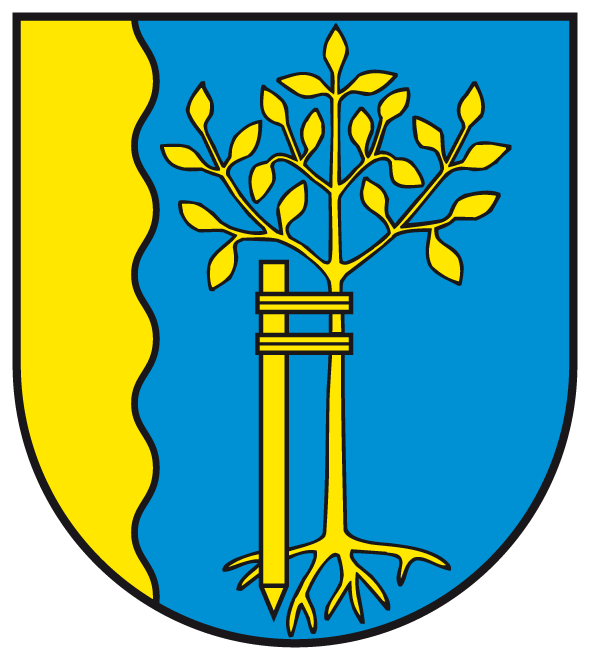
- Coat of arms
- Interactive map of Brettin
- Location within Germany Location within Saxony-Anhalt
- Coordinates: 52°26′N 12°11′E
- Country: Germany
- State: Saxony-Anhalt
- District: Jerichower Land
- Town: Jerichow

Area
  - Total: 9.02 km^{2} (3.48 sq mi)
- Elevation: 33 m (108 ft)

Population (2006-12-31)
  - Total: 846
  - Density: 93.8/km^{2} (243/sq mi)
- Time zone: UTC+01:00 (CET)
  - Summer (DST): UTC+02:00 (CEST)
- Postal codes: 39307
- Dialling codes: 03933

Brettin is a village and a former municipality in the Jerichower Land district, in Saxony-Anhalt, Germany.

Since 1 January 2010, it is part of the town Jerichow.
