= Kade, Germany =

- Stadtteil of Jerichow
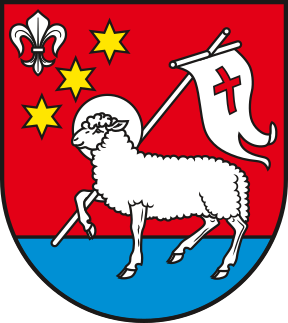
- Coat of arms
- Interactive map of Kade, Germany
- Location within Germany Location within Saxony-Anhalt
- Coordinates: 52°23′N 12°16′E
- Country: Germany
- State: Saxony-Anhalt
- District: Jerichower Land
- Town: Jerichow

Area
  - Total: 23.86 km^{2} (9.21 sq mi)
- Elevation: 34 m (112 ft)

Population (2006-12-31)
  - Total: 735
  - Density: 30.8/km^{2} (79.8/sq mi)
- Time zone: UTC+01:00 (CET)
  - Summer (DST): UTC+02:00 (CEST)
- Postal codes: 39307
- Dialling codes: 039347
- Vehicle registration: JL

Kade is a village and a former municipality in the Jerichower Land district, in Saxony-Anhalt, Germany. Since 1 January 2010, it is part of the town Jerichow.

As of 30 June 2004, it had a population of 730.

The Genthin Amateur Theater (gat) has performed its annual Christmas fairy tale in Kade.
