= Hanspeter Bellingrodt =

Colombian sports shooter (1943–2024)

Personal information
- Full name: Hanspeter Bellingrodt Wolff
- Born: 25 April 1943
- Died: 10 March 2024 (aged 80)

Sport
- Country: Colombia
- Sport: Shooting
Medal record
Representing Colombia
Men's Shooting
World Championships
Bronze medal – third place	1978 Seoul	50 m running target team

Hanspeter Bellingrodt (25 April 1943 – 10 March 2024) was a Colombian sports shooter. He finished fifteenth in the 50 metre running target event at the 1972 Summer Olympics and thirteenth in the 50 metre running target event at the 1976 Summer Olympics.

His brothers Horst and Helmut Bellingrodt were Olympians as well.

Bellingrodt died on 10 March 2024, at the age of 80.
