= Klitsche =

- Stadtteil of Jerichow
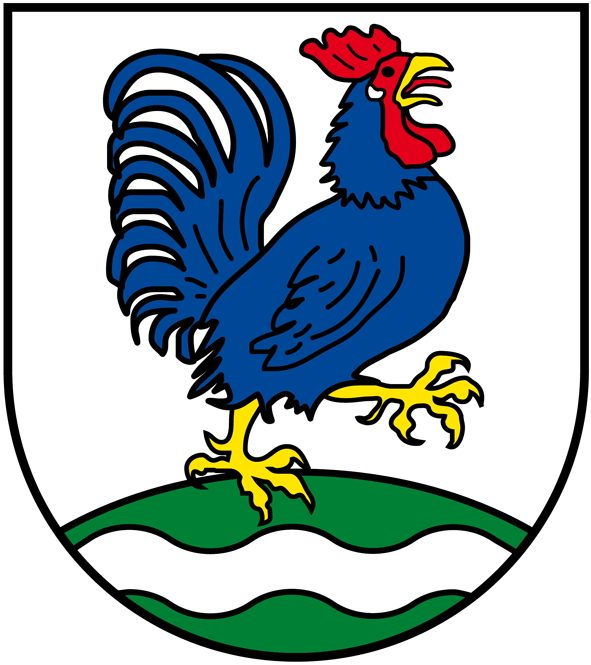
- Coat of arms
- Interactive map of Klitsche
- Location within Germany Location within Saxony-Anhalt
- Coordinates: 52°28′N 12°14′E
- Country: Germany
- State: Saxony-Anhalt
- District: Jerichower Land
- Town: Jerichow

Area
  - Total: 18.40 km^{2} (7.10 sq mi)
- Elevation: 29 m (95 ft)

Population (2006-12-31)
  - Total: 368
  - Density: 20.0/km^{2} (51.8/sq mi)
- Time zone: UTC+01:00 (CET)
  - Summer (DST): UTC+02:00 (CEST)
- Postal codes: 39307
- Dialling codes: 039348

Klitsche is a village and a former municipality in the Jerichower Land district, in Saxony-Anhalt, Germany. Since 1 January 2010, it is part of the town Jerichow.
