= Horst Bellingrodt =

Colombian sports shooter

Personal information
- Full name: Horst Bellingrodt Wolff
- Born: 7 May 1958 (age 68)

Sport
- Country: Colombia
- Sport: Shooting
Medal record
Representing Colombia
Men's Shooting
World Championships
Bronze medal – third place	1978 Seoul	50 m running target team
Pan American Games
Silver medal – second place	1983 Caracas	50 m running target team

Horst Bellingrodt (born 7 May 1958) is a Colombian Olympic sports shooter. He finished eleventh in the 50 metre running target event at the 1984 Olympics.

His brothers Hanspeter and Helmut Bellingrodt were Olympians as well.
