= Redekin =

- Stadtteil of Jerichow
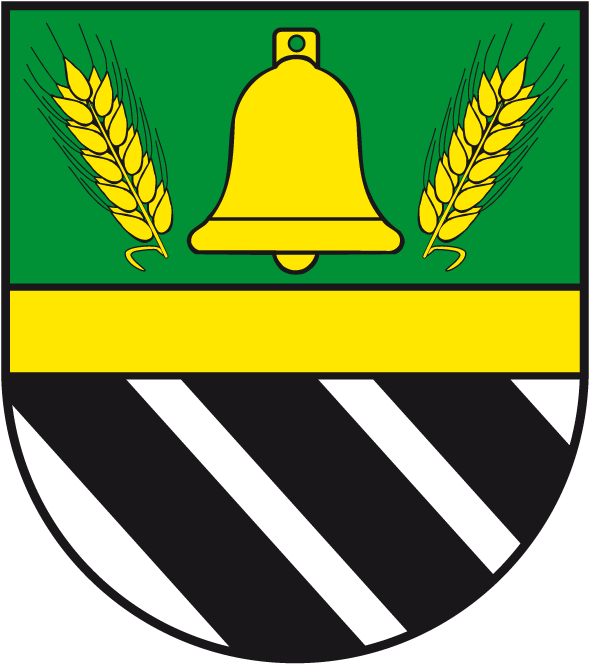
- Coat of arms
- Interactive map of Redekin
- Location within Germany Location within Saxony-Anhalt
- Coordinates: 52°28′N 12°4′E
- Country: Germany
- State: Saxony-Anhalt
- District: Jerichower Land
- Town: Jerichow

Area
  - Total: 19.21 km^{2} (7.42 sq mi)
- Elevation: 34 m (112 ft)

Population (2006-12-31)
  - Total: 680
  - Density: 35/km^{2} (92/sq mi)
- Time zone: UTC+01:00 (CET)
  - Summer (DST): UTC+02:00 (CEST)
- Postal codes: 39319
- Dialling codes: 039341
- Vehicle registration: JL
- Website: www.jerichower-land-online.de

Redekin is a village and a former municipality in the Jerichower Land district, in Saxony-Anhalt, Germany.

Since 1 January 2010, it is part of the town Jerichow.
