= Roßdorf, Saxony-Anhalt =

Roßdorf
- Stadtteil of Jerichow
- Interactive map of Roßdorf
- Location within Germany Location within Saxony-Anhalt
- Coordinates: 52°25′N 12°13′E
- Country: Germany
- State: Saxony-Anhalt
- District: Jerichower Land
- Town: Jerichow

Area
  - Total: 11.54 km^{2} (4.46 sq mi)
- Elevation: 31 m (102 ft)

Population (2006-12-31)
  - Total: 523
  - Density: 45.3/km^{2} (117/sq mi)
- Time zone: UTC+01:00 (CET)
  - Summer (DST): UTC+02:00 (CEST)
- Postal codes: 39307
- Dialling codes: 03933
- Vehicle registration: JL

Roßdorf (German pronunciation: [ˈʁɔsdɔʁf]) is a village and a former municipality in the Jerichower Land district, in Saxony-Anhalt, Germany.

Since 1 January 2010, it is part of the town Jerichow.
