= Zabakuck =

- Stadtteil of Jerichow
- Coat of arms
- Interactive map of Zabakuck
- Location within Germany Location within Saxony-Anhalt
- Coordinates: 52°27′N 12°13′E
- Country: Germany
- State: Saxony-Anhalt
- District: Jerichower Land
- Town: Jerichow

Area
  - Total: 11.41 km^{2} (4.41 sq mi)
- Elevation: 29 m (95 ft)

Population (2006-12-31)
  - Total: 206
  - Density: 18.1/km^{2} (46.8/sq mi)
- Time zone: UTC+01:00 (CET)
  - Summer (DST): UTC+02:00 (CEST)
- Postal codes: 39307
- Dialling codes: 039348

Zabakuck is a village and a former municipality in the Jerichower Land district, in Saxony-Anhalt, Germany.

Since 1 January 2010, it is part of the town Jerichow.
