= Wulkow =

- Stadtteil of Jerichow
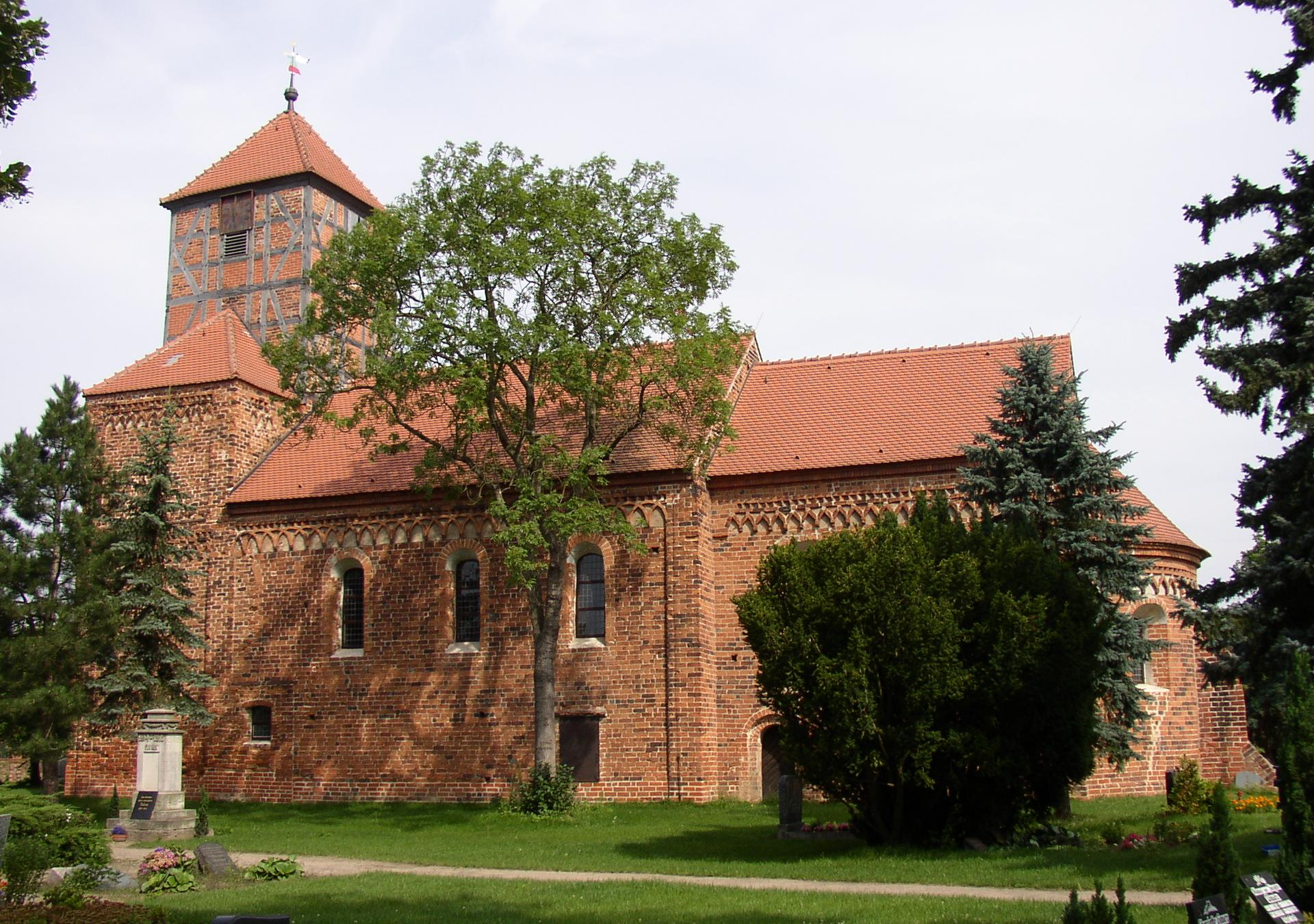
- Church

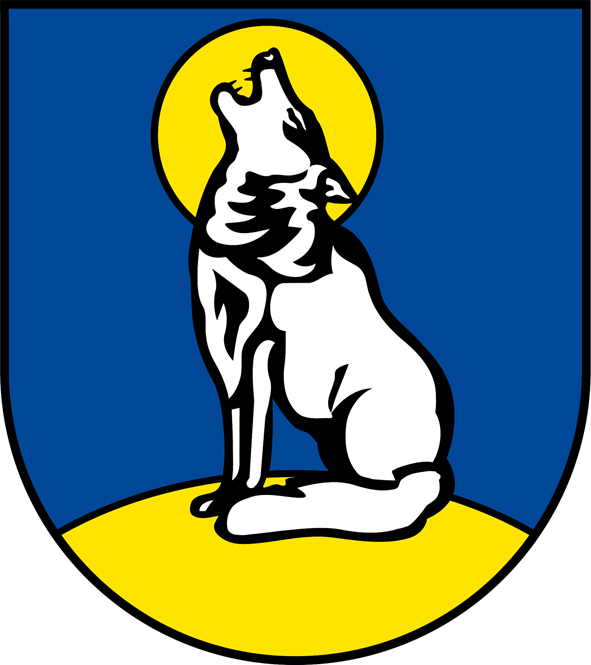
- Coat of arms
- Interactive map of Wulkow
- Location within Germany Location within Saxony-Anhalt
- Coordinates: 52°29′59″N 12°7′23″E
- Country: Germany
- State: Saxony-Anhalt
- District: Jerichower Land
- Town: Jerichow

Area
  - Total: 33.48 km^{2} (12.93 sq mi)
- Elevation: 32 m (105 ft)

Population (2006-12-31)
  - Total: 402
  - Density: 12.0/km^{2} (31.1/sq mi)
- Time zone: UTC+01:00 (CET)
  - Summer (DST): UTC+02:00 (CEST)
- Postal codes: 39307
- Dialling codes: 039323
- Vehicle registration: JL

Wulkow is a village and a former municipality in the Jerichower Land district, in Saxony-Anhalt, Germany.

Since 1 January 2010, it is part of the town Jerichow.
