= Handball at the 1972 Summer Olympics =

Tournament details
- Host country: West Germany
- Venues: 5 (in 5 host cities)
- Dates: 30 August – 10 September 1972
- Teams: 16

Final positions
- Champions: Yugoslavia (1st title)
- Runners-up: Czechoslovakia
- Third place: Romania
- Fourth place: East Germany

Tournament statistics
- Matches played: 44
- Goals scored: 1,428 (32.45 per match)
- Top scorers: (Romania) Gheorghe Gruia (37 goals)

Handball at the 1972 Summer Olympics was the second appearance of the sport at the Olympics, returning to the Olympic program after a 36-year absence. The competition was for men only and it was contested by sixteen teams.

== Format ==
The teams were split into four groups of four teams each. Each team played every other team in its group.

The lowest team in group A played the lowest in group B while the lowest in groups C and D played each other. The winners of those games played each other for 13th and 14th places, while the losers played each other for 15th and 16th.

The third-ranked teams in groups A and B also played each, as did those in groups C and D. Again, the winners of those games played each other, this time for 9th and 10th places. The losers played for 11th and 12th places.

The top two teams in each group advanced to the main round. Those from groups A and B became group I while those from groups C and D became group II. Another round-robin was played within those groups, with the results from the preliminary round carrying over.

The fourth-ranked teams in each of the two main round groups played each other for 7th and 8th place. The third-ranked teams played against each other for 5th and 6th place. The second-ranked teams played for the bronze medal and 4th place. The top teams in group I and group II played each other for the gold and silver medals.

== Medallists ==
Gold	Silver	Bronze
Yugoslavia Abaz Arslanagić; Petar Fajfrić; Hrvoje Horvat; Milorad Karalić; Đorđe Lavrnić; Milan Lazarević; Zdravko Miljak; Slobodan Mišković; Branislav Pokrajac; Nebojša Popović; Miroslav Pribanić; Albin Vidović; Zoran Živković; Zdenko Zorko	Czechoslovakia Ladislav Beneš; František Brůna; Vladimír Haber; Vladimír Jarý; Jiří Kavan; Arnošt Klimčík; Jaroslav Konečný; František Králík; Jindřich Krepindl; Vincent Lafko; Andrej Lukošík; Pavel Mikeš; Petr Pospíšil; Ivan Satrapa; Zdeněk Škára; Jaroslav Škarvan	Romania Ştefan Birtalan; Adrian Cosma; Marin Dan; Alexandru Dincă; Cristian Gaţu; Gheorghe Gruia; Roland Gunesch; Gabriel Kicsid; Ghiţă Licu; Cornel Penu; Valentin Samungi; Simion Schöbel; Werner Stöckl; Constantin Tudosie; Radu Voina

== Qualification ==
Qualification	Date	Host	Vacancies	Qualified
Host nation	26 April 1966	(Italy) Rome	1	West Germany
1970 World Championship	26 February – 8 March 1970	France	7	Romania; East Germany; Yugoslavia; Denmark; Sweden; Czechoslovakia; Hungary
Asian qualification tournament	13–29 November 1971	Japan	1	Japan
American qualification tournament	2–6 February 1972	(United States) Elkhart	1	United States
European qualification tournament	15–25 March 1972	Spain	5	Soviet Union; Norway; Iceland; Poland; Spain
African qualification tournament	25–31 March 1972	(Tunisia) Tunis	1	Tunisia
Total			16	

== Results ==
=== Preliminary round ===
==== Group A ====
Pos	Team	Pld	W	D	L	GF	GA	GD	Pts	Qualification
1	Sweden	3	1	2	0	40	34	+6	4	Main round
2	Soviet Union	3	1	2	0	40	34	+6	4	Main round
3	Poland	3	1	1	1	35	38	−3	3	9–12th place semifinals
4	Denmark	3	0	1	2	30	39	−9	1	13–16th place semifinals

30 August 1972	Denmark	12–12	Soviet Union	Donauhalle, Ulm; Referees: Falk, Rosmanith (FRG)
30 August 1972	Vodsgaard 4	(7–6)	Gassy 6	Donauhalle, Ulm; Referees: Falk, Rosmanith (FRG)

30 August 1972	Sweden	13–13	Poland	Donauhalle, Ulm; Referees: Simanović, Valčić (YUG)
30 August 1972	L. Eriksson 7	(5–7)	Dybol 7	Donauhalle, Ulm; Referees: Simanović, Valčić (YUG)

1 September 1972	Denmark	8–11	Poland	Hohenstaufenhalle, Göppingen; Referees: Keszthelyi, Márki (HUN)
1 September 1972	Hansen 4	(4–6)	Melcer 5	Hohenstaufenhalle, Göppingen; Referees: Keszthelyi, Márki (HUN)

1 September 1972	Sweden	11–11	Soviet Union	Hohenstaufenhalle, Göppingen; Referees: Reichel, Tetens (FRG)
1 September 1972	L. Eriksson 4	(4–3)	Usaty 4	Hohenstaufenhalle, Göppingen; Referees: Reichel, Tetens (FRG)

3 September 1972	Denmark	10–16	Sweden	Sporthalle, Böblingen; Referees: Cârligeanu, Sidea (ROU)
3 September 1972	K. Andersen, Hansen 4	(4–8)	Bj. Andersson, L. Eriksson 4	Sporthalle, Böblingen; Referees: Cârligeanu, Sidea (ROU)

3 September 1972	Soviet Union	17–11	Poland	Sporthalle, Böblingen; Referees: Huseby, Nilson (NOR)
3 September 1972	Ilyin 5	(9–4)	Melcer 4	Sporthalle, Böblingen; Referees: Huseby, Nilson (NOR)

==== Group B ====
Pos	Team	Pld	W	D	L	GF	GA	GD	Pts	Qualification
1	East Germany	3	3	0	0	51	32	+19	6	Main round
2	Czechoslovakia	3	1	1	1	56	40	+16	3	Main round
3	Iceland	3	1	1	1	57	51	+6	3	9–12th place semifinals
4	Tunisia	3	0	0	3	32	73	−41	0	13–16th place semifinals

30 August 1972	East Germany	16–11	Iceland	Sporthalle, Augsburg; Referees: Cârligeanu, Sidea (ROU)
30 August 1972	Randt 5	(7–6)	four players 2	Sporthalle, Augsburg; Referees: Cârligeanu, Sidea (ROU)

30 August 1972	Czechoslovakia	25–7	Tunisia	Sporthalle, Augsburg; Referees: Reichel, Tetens (FRG)
30 August 1972	Beneš 8	(10–3)	Khalladi 2	Sporthalle, Augsburg; Referees: Reichel, Tetens (FRG)

1 September 1972	East Germany	21–9	Tunisia	Donauhalle, Ulm; Referees: Huseby, Nilson (NOR)
1 September 1972	Ganschow, Lakenmacher 5	(11–2)	Hamrouni, Sebabti 3	Donauhalle, Ulm; Referees: Huseby, Nilson (NOR)

1 September 1972	Czechoslovakia	19–19	Iceland	Donauhalle, Ulm; Referees: Falk, Rosmanith (FRG)
1 September 1972	Konečný 6	(8–10)	Björgvinsson 5	Donauhalle, Ulm; Referees: Falk, Rosmanith (FRG)

3 September 1972	East Germany	14–12	Czechoslovakia	Hohenstaufenhalle, Göppingen; Referees: Simanović, Valčić (YUG)
3 September 1972	Ganschow 4	(5–4)	Konečný 7	Hohenstaufenhalle, Göppingen; Referees: Simanović, Valčić (YUG)

3 September 1972	Iceland	27–16	Tunisia	Hohenstaufenhalle, Göppingen; Referees: Keszthelyi, Márki (HUN)
3 September 1972	Magnússon 7	(14–7)	Klai, Sebabti 3	Hohenstaufenhalle, Göppingen; Referees: Keszthelyi, Márki (HUN)

==== Group C ====
Pos	Team	Pld	W	D	L	GF	GA	GD	Pts	Qualification
1	Romania	3	3	0	0	46	37	+9	6	Main round
2	West Germany (H)	3	1	1	1	39	38	+1	3	Main round
3	Norway	3	1	1	1	48	50	−2	3	9–12th place semifinals
4	Spain	3	0	0	3	39	47	−8	0	13–16th place semifinals

(H) Hosts

30 August 1972	Romania	18–14	Norway	Sporthalle, Böblingen; Referees: Siebert, Singer (GDR)
30 August 1972	Gruia, Gunnesch 6	(11–10)	T. Hansen 4	Sporthalle, Böblingen; Referees: Siebert, Singer (GDR)

30 August 1972	West Germany	13–10	Spain	Sporthalle, Böblingen; Referees: Ovdal, Rodil (DEN)
30 August 1972	Lange, Lübking 3	(7–5)	De Andrés 4	Sporthalle, Böblingen; Referees: Ovdal, Rodil (DEN)

1 September 1972	Romania	15–12	Spain	Sporthalle, Augsburg; Referees: Janerstam, Larsson (SWE)
1 September 1972	Gruia, Tudosie 3	(6–4)	De Andrés 5	Sporthalle, Augsburg; Referees: Janerstam, Larsson (SWE)

1 September 1972	West Germany	15–15	Norway	Sporthalle, Augsburg; Referees: Bertschinger, Gabriel (SUI)
1 September 1972	Bucher 7	(7–8)	Reinertsen 4	Sporthalle, Augsburg; Referees: Bertschinger, Gabriel (SUI)

3 September 1972	Romania	13–11	West Germany	Olympiahalle, Munich; Referees: Carlsson, Olsson (SWE)
3 September 1972	Gruia 7	(5–5)	Bucher, Westebbe 3	Olympiahalle, Munich; Referees: Carlsson, Olsson (SWE)

3 September 1972	Norway	19–17	Spain	Olympiahalle, Munich; Referees: Siebert, Singer (GDR)
3 September 1972	Reinertsen 5	(10–4)	Taure 6	Olympiahalle, Munich; Referees: Siebert, Singer (GDR)

==== Group D ====
Pos	Team	Pld	W	D	L	GF	GA	GD	Pts	Qualification
1	Yugoslavia	3	3	0	0	63	45	+18	6	Main round
2	Hungary	3	2	0	1	64	45	+19	4	Main round
3	Japan	3	1	0	2	46	56	−10	2	9–12th place semifinals
4	United States	3	0	0	3	46	73	−27	0	13–16th place semifinals

30 August 1972	Yugoslavia	20–14	Japan	Hohenstaufenhalle, Göppingen; Referees: Janerstam, Larsson (SWE)
30 August 1972	Lavrnić 5	(11–7)	Noda 4	Hohenstaufenhalle, Göppingen; Referees: Janerstam, Larsson (SWE)

30 August 1972	Hungary	28–15	United States	Hohenstaufenhalle, Göppingen; Referees: Repo, Tuominen (FIN)
30 August 1972	Varga 13	(16–8)	Rogers, Schlesinger 4	Hohenstaufenhalle, Göppingen; Referees: Repo, Tuominen (FIN)

1 September 1972	Yugoslavia	25–15	United States	Sporthalle, Böblingen; Referees: Siebert, Singer (GDR)
1 September 1972	Horvat, Pribanić 7	(11–9)	Abrahamson 6	Sporthalle, Böblingen; Referees: Siebert, Singer (GDR)

1 September 1972	Hungary	20–12	Japan	Sporthalle, Böblingen; Referees: Carlsson, Olsson (SWE)
1 September 1972	Varga 6	(10–7)	Chikamori, Kino 3	Sporthalle, Böblingen; Referees: Carlsson, Olsson (SWE)

3 September 1972	Yugoslavia	18–16	Hungary	Sporthalle, Augsburg; Referees: Ovdal, Rodil (DEN)
3 September 1972	Lavrnić 8	(9–8)	Varga 5	Sporthalle, Augsburg; Referees: Ovdal, Rodil (DEN)

3 September 1972	Japan	20–16	United States	Sporthalle, Augsburg; Referees: Bertschinger, Gabriel (SUI)
3 September 1972	Iida 7	(9–9)	Abrahamson, Rogers 4	Sporthalle, Augsburg; Referees: Bertschinger, Gabriel (SUI)

=== Classification round ===
==== Bracket ====
9th place bracket

9–12th place semifinals
7 September
Poland	20
Iceland	17
7 September
Norway	19
Japan	17

9th place
9 September
Poland	20
Norway (ET)	23
11th place
9 September
Iceland	18
Japan	19

13th place bracket

13–16th place semifinals
7 September
Denmark	29
Tunisia	21
7 September
Spain	20
United States	22

13th place
9 September
Denmark	19
United States	18
15th place
9 September
Tunisia	20
Spain	23

==== 13–16th place semifinals ====
7 September 1972	Denmark	29–21	Tunisia	Olympiahalle, Munich; Referees: Huseby, Nilson (NOR)
7 September 1972	Hansen 8	(11–9)	Sebabti 8	Olympiahalle, Munich; Referees: Huseby, Nilson (NOR)

7 September 1972	Spain	20–22	United States	Olympiahalle, Munich; Referees: Bertschinger, Gabriel (SUI)
7 September 1972	Morera 7	(11–8)	Abrahamson 7	Olympiahalle, Munich; Referees: Bertschinger, Gabriel (SUI)

==== 9–12th place semifinals ====
7 September 1972	Poland	20–17	Iceland	Olympiahalle, Munich; Referees: Reichel, Tetens (FRG)
7 September 1972	Antczak 5	(10–7)	Magnússon 6	Olympiahalle, Munich; Referees: Reichel, Tetens (FRG)

7 September 1972	Norway	19–17	Japan	Olympiahalle, Munich; Referees: Falk, Rosmanith (FRG)
7 September 1972	T. Hansen 5	(8–9)	Arinaga 5	Olympiahalle, Munich; Referees: Falk, Rosmanith (FRG)

==== 15th place game ====
9 September 1972	Tunisia	20–23	Spain	Olympiahalle, Munich; Referees: Falk, Rosmanith (FRG)
9 September 1972	Sebabti 9	(10–11)	Rochel 9	Olympiahalle, Munich; Referees: Falk, Rosmanith (FRG)

==== 13th place game ====
9 September 1972	Denmark	19–18	United States	Olympiahalle, Munich; Referees: Keszthelyi, Márki (HUN)
9 September 1972	Hansen 8	(12–6)	Abrahamson, Rogers 5	Olympiahalle, Munich; Referees: Keszthelyi, Márki (HUN)

==== Eleventh place game ====
9 September 1972	Iceland	18–19	Japan	Olympiahalle, Munich; Referees: Sidea, Cârligeanu (ROU)
9 September 1972	Hallsteinsson 7	(12–11)	three players 4	Olympiahalle, Munich; Referees: Sidea, Cârligeanu (ROU)

==== Ninth place game ====
9 September 1972
Poland
20–23 (ET)
Norway
Olympiahalle, Munich
Referees: Reichel, Tetens (FRG)
Melcer 6
(10–10)
T. Hansen 10

FT: 19–19 ET: 1–4

=== Main round ===
==== Group I ====
Pos	Team	Pld	W	D	L	GF	GA	GD	Pts	Qualification
1	Czechoslovakia	3	2	0	1	42	38	+4	4	Gold medal game
2	East Germany	3	2	0	1	36	34	+2	4	Bronze medal game
3	Soviet Union	3	1	1	1	34	34	0	3	Fifth place game
4	Sweden	3	0	1	2	34	40	−6	1	Seventh place game

5 September 1972	Sweden	12–15	Czechoslovakia	Olympiahalle, Munich; Referees: Falk, Rosmanith (FRG)
5 September 1972	L. Eriksson 5	(6–7)	three players 3	Olympiahalle, Munich; Referees: Falk, Rosmanith (FRG)

6 September 1972	Soviet Union	11–8	East Germany	Olympiahalle, Munich; Referees: Simanović, Valčić (YUG)
6 September 1972	Klimov, Panov 3	(4–4)	four players 2	Olympiahalle, Munich; Referees: Simanović, Valčić (YUG)

8 September 1972	Sweden	11–14	East Germany	Olympiahalle, Munich; Referees: Cârligeanu, Sidea (ROU)
8 September 1972	L. Eriksson 4	(6–8)	Ganschow 6	Olympiahalle, Munich; Referees: Cârligeanu, Sidea (ROU)

8 September 1972	Soviet Union	12–15	Czechoslovakia	Olympiahalle, Munich; Referees: Keszthelyi, Márki (HUN)
8 September 1972	Kulev 7	(7–7)	Konečný 4	Olympiahalle, Munich; Referees: Keszthelyi, Márki (HUN)

==== Group II ====
Pos	Team	Pld	W	D	L	GF	GA	GD	Pts	Qualification
1	Yugoslavia	3	3	0	0	56	44	+12	6	Gold medal game
2	Romania	3	2	0	1	46	39	+7	4	Bronze medal game
3	West Germany (H)	3	1	0	2	43	51	−8	2	Fifth place game
4	Hungary	3	0	0	3	44	55	−11	0	Seventh place game

(H) Hosts

6 September 1972	Romania	20–14	Hungary	Olympiahalle, Munich; Referees: Singer, Siebert (GDR)
6 September 1972	Gruia 8	(11–6)	Kaló, Varga 3	Olympiahalle, Munich; Referees: Singer, Siebert (GDR)

6 September 1972	West Germany	15–24	Yugoslavia	Olympiahalle, Munich; Referees: Ovdal, Rodil (DEN)
6 September 1972	Bucher, Karrer 4	(7–14)	Lavrnić, Lazarević 6	Olympiahalle, Munich; Referees: Ovdal, Rodil (DEN)

8 September 1972	Romania	13–14	Yugoslavia	Olympiahalle, Munich; Referees: Carlsson, Olsson (SWE)
8 September 1972	Gruia 8	(4–5)	Lazarević 6	Olympiahalle, Munich; Referees: Carlsson, Olsson (SWE)

8 September 1972	West Germany	17–14	Hungary	Olympiahalle, Munich; Referees: Janerstam, Larsson (SWE)
8 September 1972	Möller 6	(8–6)	Stiller, K. Vass 3	Olympiahalle, Munich; Referees: Janerstam, Larsson (SWE)

=== Final round ===
==== Seventh place game ====
10 September 1972	Sweden	19–18	Hungary	Olympiahalle, Munich; Referees: Singer, Siebert (GDR)
10 September 1972	Persson 5	(11–8)	K. Vass 6	Olympiahalle, Munich; Referees: Singer, Siebert (GDR)

==== Fifth place game ====
10 September 1972	Soviet Union	17–16	West Germany	Olympiahalle, Munich; Referees: Simanović, Valčić (YUG)
10 September 1972	Panov, Usaty 4	(10–9)	Möller, Wehnert 5	Olympiahalle, Munich; Referees: Simanović, Valčić (YUG)

==== Bronze medal game ====
10 September 1972	East Germany	16–19	Romania	Olympiahalle, Munich; Referees: Carlsson, Olsson (SWE)
10 September 1972	Böhme 4	(8–11)	Gruia, Gunesch 5	Olympiahalle, Munich; Referees: Carlsson, Olsson (SWE)

==== Gold medal game ====
10 September 1972	Yugoslavia	21–16	Czechoslovakia	Olympiahalle, Munich; Referees: Ovdal, Rodil (DEN)
10 September 1972	Lazarević 6	(12–5)	Jarý 6	Olympiahalle, Munich; Referees: Ovdal, Rodil (DEN)

== Rankings and statistics ==
=== Final ranking ===
Rank	Team
1st place, gold medalist(s)	Yugoslavia
2nd place, silver medalist(s)	Czechoslovakia
3rd place, bronze medalist(s)	Romania
4	East Germany
5	Soviet Union
6	West Germany
7	Sweden
8	Hungary
9	Norway
10	Poland
11	Japan
12	Iceland
13	Denmark
14	United States
15	Spain
16	Tunisia

=== Top goalscorers ===
Rank	Name	Goals
1	(Romania) Gheorghe Gruia	37
2	(Hungary) István Varga	32
3	(Socialist Federal Republic of Yugoslavia) Đorđe Lavrnić	28
4	(Denmark) Flemming Hansen	27
4	(Socialist Federal Republic of Yugoslavia) Milan Lazarević	27
6	(Sweden) Lennart Eriksson	25
7	(United States) Richard Abrahamson	24
7	(Tunisia) Mohamed Sebabti	24
9	(Norway) Torstein Hansen	22
9	(Czechoslovakia) Jaroslav Konečný	22

== Participating nations ==
Each country was allowed to enter a team of 16 players and they all were eligible for participation. Japan entered only a squad of twelve.

A total of 242(*) handball players from 16 nations competed at the Munich Games:

- Czechoslovakia (16)
- Denmark (16)
- East Germany (16)
- West Germany (16)
- Hungary (15)
- Iceland (15)
- Japan (12)
- Norway (16)
- Poland (15)
- Romania (15)
- Soviet Union (15)
- Spain (15)
- Sweden (16)
- Tunisia (15)
- United States (15)
- Yugoslavia (14)

(*) NOTE: There are only players counted, which participated in one game at least.

Not all reserve players are known.

== Team rosters ==
Czechoslovakia	Denmark	East Germany	Hungary
Ladislav Beneš; František Brůna; Vladimír Haber; Vladimír Jarý; Jiří Kavan; Arnošt Klimčík; Jaroslav Konečný; František Králík; Jindřich Krepindl; Vincent Lafko; Andrej Lukošík; Pavel Mikeš; Petr Pospíšil; Ivan Satrapa; Zdeněk Škára; Jaroslav Škarvan	Arne Andersen; Keld Andersen; Jørgen Frandsen; Claus From; Flemming Hansen; Jørgen Heidemann; Søren Jensen; Bent Jørgensen; Kay Jørgensen; Flemming Lauritzen; Svend Lund; Tom Lund; Thor Munkager; Vagn Nielsen; Karsten Sørensen; Jørgen Vodsgaard	Wolfgang Böhme; Reiner Frieske; Reiner Ganschow; Jürgen Hildebrand; Horst Jankhöfer; Wolfgang Lakenmacher; Klaus Langhoff; Peter Larisch; Peter Randt; Udo Röhrig; Josef Rose; Siegfried Voigt; Klaus Weiß; Rainer Würdig; Rainer Zimmermann; Harry Zörnack	János Adorján; Béla Bartalos; János Csík; László Harka; József Horváth; Sándor Kaló; István Marosi; Lajos Simó; János Stiller; István Szabó; László Szabó; Sándor Takács; István Varga (BHSE); Károly Vass (Elektromos SE); Sándor Vass (Elektromos SE) Gyula Hurth
Iceland	Japan	Norway	Poland
Axel Axelsson; Ólafur Benediktsson; Björgvin Björgvinsson; Hjalti Einarsson; Sigurður Einarsson; Birgir Finnbogason; Stefán Gunnarsson; Geir Hallsteinsson; Ólafur Jónsson; Stefán Jónsson; Jón Magnússon; Ágúst Ögmundsson; Sigurbergur Sigsteinsson; Viðar Símonarson; Gunnsteinn Skúlason Gísli Blöndal	Shuji Arinaga; Katsuhiko Chikamori; Kiyotaka Hayakawa; Hiroshi Honda; Masayuki Hyokai; Nobuyuki Iida; Minoru Kino; Takezo Nakai; Toshio Niimi; Kiyoshi Noda; Kenichi Sasaki; Toshihiko Shimosato	Per Ankre; Arnulf Bæk; Pål Bye; Pål Cappelen; Carl Graff-Wang; Inge Hansen; Torstein Hansen; Roger Hverven; Ulf Magnussen; Jan Økseter; Sten Osther; Jon Reinertsen; Geir Røse; Per Søderstrøm; Harald Tyrdal; Finn Urdal; Coach: Thor Nohr	Zdzisław Antczak; Zbigniew Dybol; Franciszek Gąsior; Jan Gmyrek; Bogdan Kowalczyk; Zygfryd Kuchta; Andrzej Lech; Jerzy Melcer; Helmut Pniociński; Henryk Rozmiarek; Andrzej Sokołowski; Engelbert Szolc; Andrzej Szymczak; Włodzimierz Wachowicz; Robert Zawada
Romania	Soviet Union	Spain	Sweden
Ştefan Birtalan; Adrian Cosma; Marin Dan; Alexandru Dincă; Cristian Gaţu; Gheorghe Gruia; Roland Gunesch; Gabriel Kicsid; Ghiţă Licu; Cornel Penu; Valentin Samungi; Simion Schöbel; Werner Stöckl; Constantin Tudosie; Radu Voina	Valeri Gassy(University Krasnodar); Vasily Ilyin(MAI Moscow); Mykhaylo Ishchenko(ZMetI Zaporozhzhie); Yury Klimov(MAI Moscow); Valentin Kulev(Kuntsevo Moscow); Yuriy Lahutyn(ZMetI Zaporozhzhie); Mikhail Lutsenko(Kuntsevo Moscow); Vladimir Maksimov(MAI Moscow); Albert Oganezov(MAI Moscow); Aleksandr Panov(University Krasnodar); Oleksandr Rezanov(ZMetI Zaporozhzhie); Nikolay Semyonov(Kuntsevo Moscow); Anatoly Shevchenko(Kuntsevo Moscow); Ivan Usaty(CSKA Moscow); Jānis Vilsons(MAI Moscow)	Antonio Andreu; Miguel Ángel Cascallana; Fernando de Andrés; Javier García; Jesús Guerrero; Juan Miguel Igartua; Santos Labaca; Francisco López; Juan Antonio Medina; Juan Morera; Vicente Ortega; José Perramón; José Rochel; José Manuel Taure; José Villamarín	Björn Andersson; Bo Andersson; Dan Eriksson; Lennart Eriksson; Johan Fischerström; Göran Hård af Segerstad; Bengt Johansson; Benny Johansson; Jan Jonsson; Lars Karlsson; Michael Koch; Olle Olsson; Sten Olsson; Thomas Persson; Bertil Söderberg; Frank Ström
Tunisia	United States	West Germany	Yugoslavia
Ahmed Bechir Bel Hadj; Abderraouf Ben Samir; Moncef Besbes; Rached Boudhina; Taoufik Djemail; Aleya Hamrouni; Mohamed Naceur Jelili; Mounir Jelili; Mohamed Klai; Mohamed Khalladi; Faouzi Ksouri; Moncef Loueslati; Mohamed Sebabti; Amor Sghaier; Abdel Aziz Zaibi; Ridha Zitoun	Richard Abrahamson; Fletcher Abram; Roger Baker; Dennis Berkholtz; Larry Caton; Vincent DiCalogero; Elmer Edes; Thomas Hardiman; Rudolph Matthews; Sandor Rivnyak; James Rogers; Richard Schlesinger; Kevin Serrapede; Robert Sparks; Joel Voelkert; Coach: Peter Buehning Sr. Assistant coach: Laszlo Jurak Harry Winkler	Herwig Ahrendsen; Hans-Jürgen Bode; Wolfgang Braun; Peter Bucher; Jochen Feldhoff; Diethard Finkelmann; Josef Karrer; Klaus Kater; Klaus Lange; Herbert Lübking; Heiner Möller; Hans-Peter Neuhaus; Uwe Rathjen; Herbert Rogge; Herbert Wehnert; Klaus Westebbe	Abas Arslanagić (Borac Banja Luka); Petar Fajfrić (Crvenka); Hrvoje Horvat (Partizan Bjelovar); Milorad Karalić (Borac Banja Luka); Đorđe Lavrnić (Krivaja Zavidovići); Milan Lazarević (Crvena zvezda Beograd); Zdravko Miljak (Medveščak Zagreb); Slobodan Mišković (Crvenka); Branislav Pokrajac (Dinamo Pančevo); Nebojša Popović (Borac Banja Luka); Miroslav Pribanić (Partizan Bjelovar); Albin Vidović (BHSE); Zoran Živković (FAP Priboj na Limu); Zdenko Zorko (Zagreb); Coach: Vlado Štencl Čedomir Bugarski; Dobrivoje Selec
