= Handball at the 1967 Mediterranean Games =

Wrestling competition

- Location: Tunis, Tunisia
- Dates: 10–15 September 1967
- Teams: 4

The handball tournament at the 1967 Mediterranean Games was held in Tunis, Tunisia.

Four men's national teams took part in the competition, which was played in a round-robin format, with each team playing every other team once.

== Medalists ==
Event	Gold	Silver	Bronze
Men's tournament	Yugoslavia (YUG); Petar Fajfrić; Hrvoje Horvat; Milorad Karalić; Miroslav Klišanin; Slobodan Koprivica; Boris Kostić; Josip Milković; Branislav Pokrajac; Nebojša Popović; Ivan Uremović; Albin Vidović; Zoran Živković	Spain (ESP); Jesús Guerrero; Jose Hualde; Jesus Alcalde; Antonio Andreu; Santiago Gil; Francisco López; José Rochel; Arné Roland; Jose Andonegui; Fermin Ibarrola; Juan Morera; Jose Gamboa; Antonio Almandoz	Tunisia (TUN)

== Standings ==
Rank	Team	Pld	W	D	L	GF	GA	GD	Pts
1	(Socialist Federal Republic of Yugoslavia) Yugoslavia (YUG)	3	3	0	0	79	30	+49	6
2	Spain (ESP)	3	2	0	1	44	42	+2	4
3	Tunisia (TUN)	3	1	0	2	33	56	–23	2
4	Algeria (ALG)	3	0	0	3	30	58	–28	0

== Teams ==
=== Algeria ===
- Ben Elkadi
- Bakouche
- Fayçal Hachemi (gardien)
- Boukhobza
- Driss Lamdjadani
- Meskouri
- Benabdellah
- Nadjib
- Rabah Chebira
- Debiche
- Menia
- Ikhlef
- Djoudi
- Betahar
- Lakhdar Driss.

Coaches:

- Pavel Bohenski
- Benbelkacem
