= Handball at the 1972 Summer Olympics – Qualification =

The qualification for the 1972 Men's Olympic Handball Tournament assigned quota places to sixteens teams: the host, seven teams from the world championships, four continental champions and six teams from the World Olympic qualification tournaments respectively.

== Qualification summary ==
Qualification	Date	Host	Vacancies	Qualified
Host nation	26 April 1966	(Italy) Rome	1	West Germany
1970 World Championship	26 February – 8 March 1970	France	7	Romania; East Germany; Yugoslavia; Denmark; Sweden; Czechoslovakia; Hungary
Asian qualification tournament	13–29 November 1971	Japan	1	Japan
American qualification tournament	2–6 February 1972	(United States) Elkhart	1	United States
European qualification tournament	15–25 March 1972	Spain	5	Soviet Union; Norway; Iceland; Poland; Spain
African qualification tournament	25–31 March 1972	(Tunisia) Tunis	1	Tunisia
Total			16	

== Legend for qualification type ==
Qualified
Key	From	To
	World Championship	Olympic Tournament
	World Championship	Qualification Tournament

== Host country ==
- West Germany

== World Championship ==
Rank	Team
1st place, gold medalist(s)	Romania
2nd place, silver medalist(s)	East Germany
3rd place, bronze medalist(s)	Yugoslavia
4	Denmark
5	West Germany
6	Sweden
7	Czechoslovakia
8	Hungary
9	Soviet Union
10	Japan
11	Iceland
12	France
13	Norway
14	Poland
15	Switzerland
16	United States

== Asian qualification tournament ==
Pos	Team	Pld	W	D	L	GF	GA	GD	Pts	Qualification
1	Japan (H)	4	4	0	0	74	24	+50	8	1972 Summer Olympics
2	Israel	4	1	0	3	46	63	−17	2 (Note: Israel against South Korea +5 goals total 35–30)	
3	South Korea	4	1	0	3	43	76	−33	2	
4	Taiwan (W)	0	0	0	0	0	0	0	0	

Source: Todor66
Rules for classification: 1) Points; 2) Head-to-head points; 3) Head-to-head goal difference; 4) Head-to-head goals scored; 5) Goal difference; 6) Goals scored; 7) Draw.
(H) Hosts; (W) Withdraw

== American qualification tournament ==
Pos	Team	Pld	W	D	L	GF	GA	GD	Pts	Qualification
1	United States (H)	3	3	0	0	70	35	+35	6	1972 Summer Olympics
2	Canada	3	2	0	1	57	31	+26	4	
3	Argentina	3	1	0	2	53	64	−11	2	
4	Mexico	3	0	0	3	36	86	−50	0	

Source: Todor66
Rules for classification: 1) Points; 2) Head-to-head points; 3) Head-to-head goal difference; 4) Head-to-head goals scored; 5) Goal difference; 6) Goals scored; 7) Draw.
(H) Hosts

== African qualification tournament ==
Pos	Team	Pld	W	D	L	GF	GA	GD	Pts	Qualification
1	Tunisia (H)	5	4	0	1	97	86	+11	8	1972 Summer Olympics
2	Egypt	5	3	1	1	105	81	+24	7	
3	Senegal	5	3	0	2	97	100	−3	6	
4	Algeria	5	2	1	2	90	94	−4	5	
5	Cameroon	5	2	0	3	91	99	−8	4	
6	Morocco	5	0	0	5	83	103	−20	0	

Source: Der Bund
Rules for classification: 1) Points; 2) Head-to-head points; 3) Head-to-head goal difference; 4) Head-to-head goals scored; 5) Goal difference; 6) Goals scored; 7) Draw.
(H) Hosts
