= Bent Jørgensen =

Bent Jørgensen may refer to:

- Bent Jørgensen (handballer) (born 1945), Danish handball player
- Bent Jørgensen (cyclist) (1923–2004), Danish cyclist
- Bent Jørgensen (statistician) (1954–2015), Danish statistician
