= Arinaga =

Arinaga (written: 有永 or 有栄) is both a Japanese surname and a masculine Japanese given name. Notable people with the name include:

- Kazuki Arinaga (有永一生, born 1989), Japanese footballer
- Shuji Arinaga (有永 修二, born 1948), Japanese handball player
- Yamada Arinaga (山田 有栄, 1578–1668), Japanese samurai
