= Arne Andersen (handballer) =

Danish handball player (1944-2016)

Arne Andersen (7 February 1944 – 4 February 2016) was a Danish handball player who competed in the 1972 Summer Olympics.

He played his club handball with Efterslægten, and was the top goalscorer of the club in the 1972 Danish Handball League. In 1967 he was part of the Danish team that won silver medals at the 1967 World Championship. In 1972 he was part of the Denmark men's national handball team which finished thirteenth in the Olympic tournament. He played all five matches and scored three goals.
