= Lars Karlsson =

Lars Karlsson may refer to:

- Lars Karlsson (handballer) (born 1948), Swedish handball player
- Lars Erik Karlsson, Swedish darts player
- Lars Karlsson (chess player) (born 1955), Swedish Grandmaster
- Lars Karlsson (ice hockey) (born 1960), Swedish ice hockey player
- Lars Peter Karlsson (born 1966), Swedish ice hockey player
