= Langhoff (surname) =

Langhoff is a surname of German and Danish origin. Notable people with the surname include:

- Irv Langhoff , American football player
- Josh Langhoff, American musician
- Klaus Langhoff, German handball player
- Paul Langhoff, German racing cyclist
- Peter Langhoff, Danish footballer
- Rasmus Horn Langhoff, Danish politician
- Şermin Langhoff, German theater producer
- Stephanie Langhoff, American television and film producer
- Wolfgang Langhoff, German actor and director
- Matthes Langhoff, German handball player
