= Michael Koch =

Michael or Mike Koch may refer to:

- Michael Koch (basketball) (born 1966), German basketball coach and player
- Michael Koch (film director) (born 1982), Swiss film director and screenwriter
- Michael Koch (handballer) (born 1942), Swedish handball player
- Michael Koch (footballer), German footballer
- Mike Koch (racing driver) (born 1963), American stock car racing driver
