= Aleksandr Panov =

Aleksandr Panov, or Alexander Panov, may refer to:

- Aleksandr Panov (diplomat) (born 1944), Russian Ambassador and rector of the Diplomatic Academy of the MFA of Russia
- Aleksandr Panov (handballer) (born 1946), Soviet handballer
- Aleksandr Panov (footballer) (born 1975), Russian footballer
- Aleksandr Panov (animator) for The Tale of Tsar Saltan (1984 film) and The Cat Who Walked by Herself
