= Würdig =

Würdig is a German surname, which means ‘worthy, estimable’. Notable people with the surname include:

- Sido (rapper) (real name Paul Würdig; born 1980), German rapper
- Rainer Würdig (born 1947), East German former handball player
