= Villamarín =

Villamarín may refer to:

- Villamarín (Grado), Parish in Asturias, Spain
- Estadio Benito Villamarín, football stadium in Spain used by Real Betis
- Edgar Villamarín (born 1982), Peruvian footballer
- José Villamarín (born 1950), Spanish handball player
