= Mounir Jelili =

Tunisian handball player (1949–2023)

Personal information
- Nationality: Tunisian
- Born: 11 June 1949
- Died: 24 January 2023 (aged 73)
- Height: 184 cm (72 in)

Sport
- Sport: Handball

Senior clubs
- Years: Team
- ?-?: Espérance ST
National team
Years	Team	Apps
?-?	Tunisia	1
- Updated on only during the 1972 Summer Olympics

Mounir Jelili (Arabic: منير الجليلي; 11 June 1949 – 24 January 2023) was a Tunisian handball player. He was a member of the Tunisia men's national handball team. He was part of the team at the 1972 Summer Olympics playing one match and at the 1976 Summer Olympics. On club level he played for Espérance ST in Tunis.

Mounir Jelili was the older brother of handballer Mohamed Naceur Jelili who also competed for the Tunisian team at the 1972 and 1976 Summer Olympics.

Jelili died on 24 January 2023, at the age of 73.
