= Milan Lazarević =

Milan Lazarević may refer to:

- Milan Lazarević (handballer) (born 1948), Yugoslav handball player
- Milan Lazarević (footballer) (born 1997), Serbian footballer
