= Lennart Eriksson =

Lennart Eriksson may refer to:

- Lennart Eriksson (handballer) (born 1944), Swedish handball player
- Lennart Eriksson (musician) (born 1956), Swedish punk rock musician
- Lennart Eriksson (wrestler) (1939–2017), Swedish Olympic wrestler
