= Werner Stöckl =

Romanian handball player (born 1952)

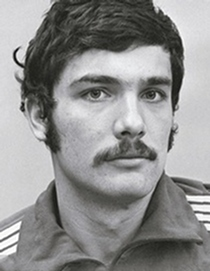

Personal information
- Born: 28 June 1952 (age 74) Reșița, Romania
- Height: 188 cm (6 ft 2 in)
- Weight: 94 kg (207 lb)

Sport
- Sport: Handball
- Club: Steaua București (1969–1981); Carpați Mârșa (1981–1987); TuS Hofweier (1987–1988)
Medal record
Representing Romania
Olympic Games
Silver medal – second place	1976 Montreal	Team
Bronze medal – third place	1972 Munich	Team
World Championships
Gold medal – first place	1974 East Germany	Team

Werner Stöckl (born 28 June 1952) is a retired Romanian handball player of Banat Swabian ethnicity. He won the world title in 1974 and two Olympic medals in 1972 and 1976.

Stöckl took up handball in 1967 and in 1969 joined Steaua București, winning with them the EHF Champions League title in 1977. In 1981 he transferred to Carpați Mârșa and helped to promote them from the second to the first division. In 1987 he immigrated with his wife to West Germany, where he played one year for TuS Hofweier upon recommendation from fellow player Simon Schobel. After that he worked as a handball coach.

== Awards ==
- Honorary citizen of the municipality of Reșița (Romania)
- 1974: Maestru emerit al sportului (≈ "Outstanding Master of Sports")
- 2009: Meritul Sportiv Cl. a II-a (≈ "Sports Award Second Class")
