= Björgvinsson =

Björgvinsson may refer to:

- Ágúst Björgvinsson (born 1979), Icelandic professional basketball coach
- Ágúst Elí Björgvinsson (born 1995), Icelandic handball player
- Björgvin Björgvinsson (skier) (born 1980), Icelandic Olympic alpine skier
- Björgvin Björgvinsson (handballer) (born 1949), Icelandic former Olympic handball player
- Eiríkur Björn Björgvinsson (born 1966), Icelandic politician
- Sighvatur Kristinn Björgvinsson (born 1942), Icelandic politician and former minister
- Svali Björgvinsson (born 1967), Icelandic businessman, sportscaster, former basketball player

== See also ==
- Björgvin Hólm
