= Niimi (surname) =

Niimi (written: 新見, 新美 or 新実) is a Japanese surname. Notable people with the surname include:

- Masaichi Niimi (新見 政一) (1887–1993), Imperial Japanese Navy admiral
- Nishiki Niimi (新見 錦) (1836–1863), a commander of the Shinsengumi
- Nankichi Niimi (新美 南吉) (1913–1943), Japanese writer
- Shohei Niimi (新実彰平) (born 1989), Japanese politician
- Takahiro Niimi (新見 能弘) (born 1974), Japanese taekwondo practitioner
- Tomomitsu Niimi (新実 智光) (born 1964), Aum Shinrikyo member
- Toshio Niimi (新実 俊夫) (born 1949), Japanese handball player
