= Richard Schlesinger =

Richard Schlesinger may refer to:

- Richard Schlesinger (handballer) (born 1946), American former handball player who competed in the 1972 Summer Olympics
- Richard Schlesinger (tennis) (1900–?), Australian tennis player
- Richard Schlesinger (journalist), American correspondent for 48 Hours
