= Sghaier =

Sghaier is a surname. Notable people with the surname include:

- Ahmed Sghaïer (born 1937), Tunisian footballer
- Amor Sghaier (born 1950), Tunisian handball player
- Mohamed Sghaier (born 1988), Tunisian hurdler
- Zaineb Sghaier (born 2002), Tunisian freestyle wrestler
