= Tom Lund (handballer) =

Danish handball player (1944–2000)

Tom Benny Lund (26 November 1944 – 16 October 2000) was a Danish handball player who competed in the 1972 Summer Olympics.

He played his club handball with Efterslægten. He played his first match for the Danish national team in April 1970 against Czechoslovakia. In 1972 he was part of the Danish team which finished thirteenth in the Olympic tournament. He played four matches and scored six goals.

In total he played 44 games for the Danish national team, scoring 54 goals.
