= Søren Jensen (handballer) =

Danish handball player (born 1942)

Søren Andkjer Jensen (born 7 November 1942 in Copenhagen) is a Danish former handball player who competed in the 1972 Summer Olympics.

He played his club handball with Efterslægten. In 1972 he was part of the Danish team which finished thirteenth in the Olympic tournament. He played four matches and scored one goal.
