= Toshihiko =

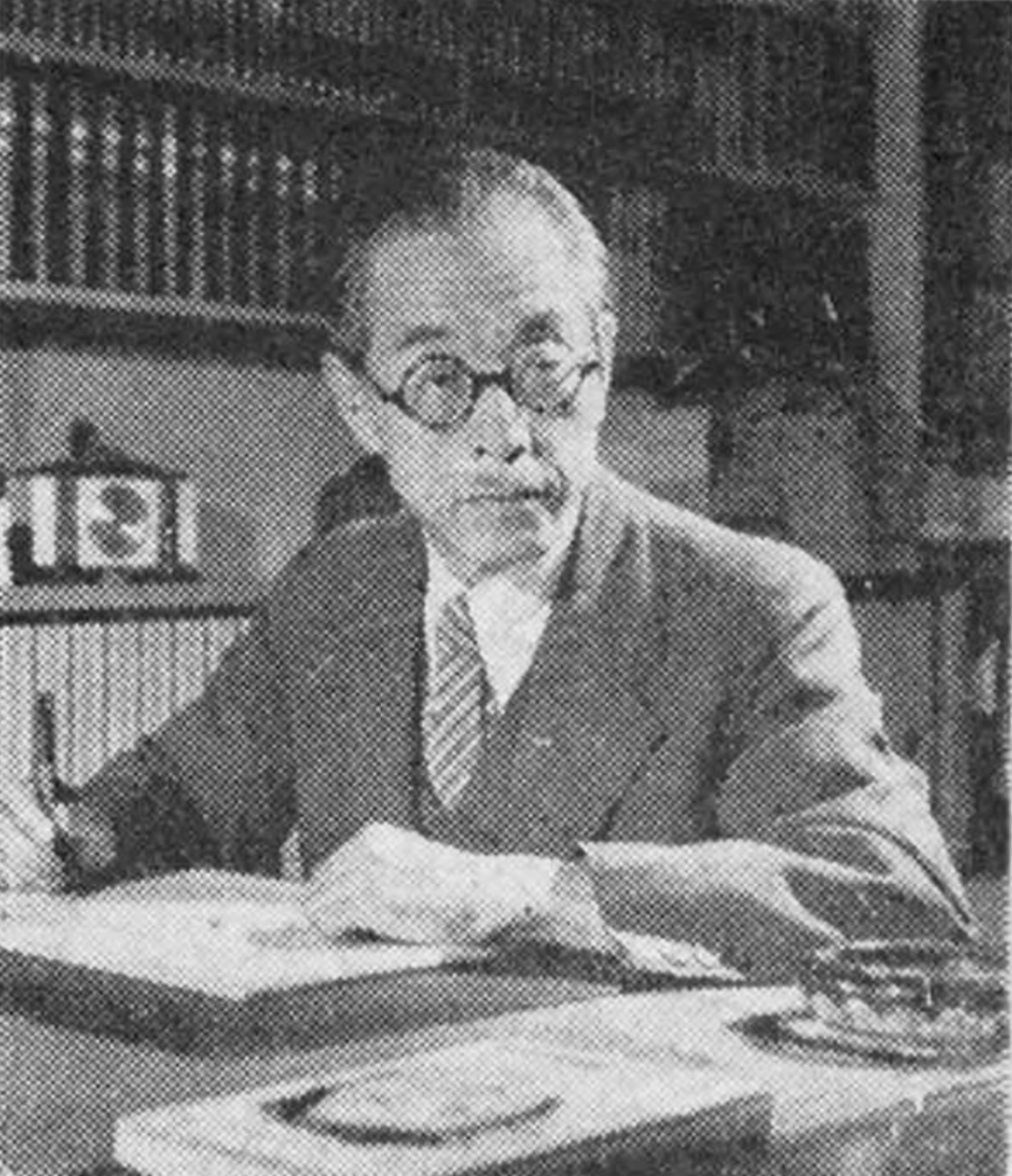
- Toshihiko Takeda (1891–1961), Japanese novelist
- Pronunciation: toɕiçiko (IPA)
- Gender: Male

Origin
- Origin: Japanese
- Meaning: Different meanings depending on the kanji used

Other names
- Alternative spelling: Tosihiko (Kunrei-shiki) Tosihiko (Nihon-shiki) Toshihiko (Hepburn)

Toshihiko is a masculine Japanese given name.

== Written forms ==
Toshihiko can be written using different combinations of kanji characters. Some examples:

- 敏彦, "agile, elegant boy"
- 敏比古, "agile, young man (archaic)"
- 俊彦, "talented, elegant boy"
- 俊比古, "talented, young man (archaic)"
- 利彦, "benefit, elegant boy"
- 利比古, "benefit, young man (archaic)"
- 年彦, "year, elegant boy"
- 年比古, "year, young man (archaic)"
- 寿彦, "long life, elegant boy"
- 寿比古, "long life, young man (archaic)"

== Notable people with the name ==
- Toshihiko Fukui (福井 俊彦, born 1935), Japanese economist and banker.
- Toshihiko Itokawa (糸川 敏彦, born 1974), Japanese speed skater.
- Toshihiko Iwasaki (岩崎 利彦, born 1967), Japanese hurdler.
- Toshihiko Izutsu (井筒 俊彦, 1914–1993), Japanese academic and writer.
- Toshihiko Kobayashi (小林 俊彦), Japanese manga artist.
- Toshihiko Koga (古賀 稔彦, born 1967), Japanese judoka.
- Toshihiko Kuramoto (倉本 寿彦, born 1991), Japanese baseball player.
- Toshihiko Miyata (宮田 俊彦), Japanese table tennis player.
- Toshihiko Nakajima (中嶋 聡彦, born 1962), Japanese voice actor.
- Toshihiko Okimune (沖宗 敏彦, born 1959), Japanese footballer.
- Toshihiko Sahashi (佐橋 俊彦, born 1959), Japanese composer.
- Toshihiko Sakai (堺 利彦, 1871–1933), Japanese socialist, writer and historian.
- Toshihiko Seki (関 俊彦, born 1962), Japanese voice actor.
- Toshihiko Seko (瀬古 利彦, born 1956), Japanese long-distance runner.
- Toshihiko Shimosato (下里 敏彦, born 1946), Japanese handball player.
- Toshihiko Shoji (庄司 敏彦, 1909–?), Japanese ice hockey player.
- Toshihiko Tahara (田原 俊彦, born 1961), Japanese idol singer.
- Toshihiko Takeda (竹田 敏彦, 1891–1961), Japanese novelist.
- Toshihiko Uchiyama (footballer, born 1978) (内山 俊彦), Japanese footballer.
- Toshihiko Yamada (山田 敏彦, born 1932), Japanese ice hockey player.

== See also ==
- 9098 Toshihiko, a main-belt asteroid
