= Larry Caton =

American handball player (1948–2025)

Personal information
- Full name: Lawrence Ray Caton
- Born: March 2, 1948 Normal, Illinois, U.S.
- Died: November 6, 2025 (aged 77)

Sport
- Sport: Handball

Lawrence Ray Caton (March 2, 1948 – November 6, 2025) was an American handball player who competed in the 1972 Summer Olympics.

In 1972, he was part of the American team which finished 14th in the Olympic tournament. He played in one match.

Caton died on November 6, 2025, at the age of 77.
