= Roger Baker (handballer) =

American handball player

Personal information
- Full name: Roger Lewis Baker
- Born: August 10, 1946 (age 80) United States

Sport
- Sport: Handball

Roger Lewis Baker (born August 10, 1946) is an American former handball player who competed in the 1972 Summer Olympics and in the 1976 Summer Olympics.

He was born in Hood River, Oregon.

He played basketball at Linfield University for four years under Hall of Fame Coach Ted Wilson.

As team co-captain in 1968, Baker helped Linfield capture the Northwest Conference title with a 16-2 record. He was voted the Wildcats’ most valuable and best defensive player by his teammates while earning unanimous first team all-conference recognition.

Following graduation, Baker entered the U.S. Army where he continued to compete in basketball. Eventually, his interests turned to the burgeoning sport of team handball.

Playing for Team USA, Baker excelled as a team leader and defensive star. He played a large role in piloting the Americans to gold medals in the 1971 and ’75 Pan American Games, which paved the way to invitations to compete in the 1972 and ’76 Olympic Games.

In 1972 he was part of the American team which finished 14th in the Olympic tournament. He played all five matches and scored eleven goals.

Four years later he finished tenth with the American team in the 1976 Olympic tournament. He played all five matches and scored ten goals.
