= Thor Munkager =

Danish handball player (1951-2017)

Personal information
- Nationality: Danish
- Born: 31 March 1951 (age 75) Frederiksberg, Denmark
- Died: 4 December 2017 (aged 66)
- Height: 183 cm (72 in)

Sport
- Sport: Handball
- Position: Pivot

Senior clubs
- Years: Team
- 1971-1978: Helsingør IF
National team
Years	Team	Apps	(Gls)
1971-1978	Denmark	102	(136)

Teams managed
- –: Helsingør IF; HIK] AB] Frederiksberg IF

Thor Munkager (Morfar til Mathias Munkager) (31 March 1951 in Copenhagen – 4 December 2017) was a Danish handball player and later handball coach. He competed in the 1972 Summer Olympics and in the 1976 Summer Olympics.

He played his club handball with Helsingør IF, playing alongside Torben Winther. Here he managed to win 3 silver medals and 2 bronze medals over the course of his career. In 1972 he was part of the Denmark men's national handball team which finished thirteenth in the Olympic tournament. He played two matches and scored four goals. Four years later he finished eighth with the Danish team in the 1976 Olympic tournament. He played four matches.

He was the head coach of multiple Danish clubs in both the Danish Men's Handball League and in the Danish Women's Handball League. He won the Women's league twice, once with Helsingør IF and once with Frederiksberg IF. He was the assistant coach of the Danish national team under head coach Torben Winther.
