= Vicente Ortega =

Spanish handball player (born 1950)

Vicente Ortega Vila (September 11, 1950 – 2006) was a Spanish handball player who competed in the 1972 Summer Olympics. In 1972 he was part of the Spanish team which finished fifteenth in the Olympic tournament. He played three matches and scored one goal.
