= José Manuel Taure =

Spanish handball player (born 1949)

José Manuel Taure Menéndez (born 14 April 1949) is a former Spanish handball player. He competed in the 1972 Summer Olympics.

In 1972, he was part of the Spanish team which finished fifteenth in the Olympic tournament. He played all five matches and scored fifteen goals.
