= Mohamed Khalladi =

Tunisian handball player

Personal information
- Nationality: Tunisian
- Born: 23 March 1942 (age 83)

Sport
- Sport: Handball

Mohamed Khalladi (born 23 March 1942) is a Tunisian handball player. He competed in the men's tournament at the 1972 Summer Olympics.
