= Constantin Tudosie =

Romanian handball player (born 1950)

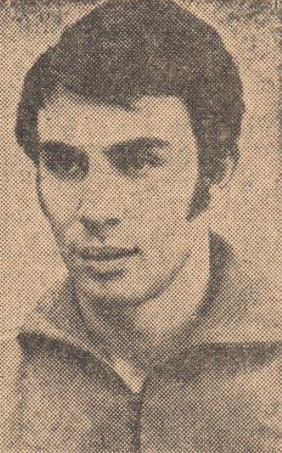
- Tudosie circa 1974

Constantin Tudosie
Medal record

Men's Handball

Representing Romania

Olympic Games
| Silver medal – second place | 1976 Montreal | Team |
| Bronze medal – third place | 1972 Munich | Team |

World Championship
| Gold medal – first place | 1974 East Germany | Team |

Constantin Tudosie (born 23 March 1950 in Leu, Dolj) is a Romanian former handball player and World Champion who competed in the 1972 Summer Olympics and the 1976 Summer Olympics.

In 1972, he won the bronze medal with the Romanian team. He played three matches and scored three goals.

Four years later he won the silver medal as part of the Romanian team. He played all five matches and scored four goals.

In the late 1970s, he moved to West Germany, where he also worked as a coach.

== Clubs ==
- 1970–1973 Universitatea Cluj
- 1973–1979 Steaua București
