= Finn Urdal =

Norwegian handball player (born 1944)

Finn Urdal (born 9 September 1944) is a retired Norwegian handball player who competed in the 1972 Summer Olympics.

He was born in Horten and represented the club Fredensborg/Ski HK. In 1972 he was part of the Norwegian team, which finished ninth in the Olympic tournament. He played three matches and scored three goals.
