= Jindřich Krepindl =

Czech handball player

Olympic medal record

Men's Handball
Silver medal – second place	1972 Munich	Team competition

Jindřich Krepindl (born 6 July 1948 in Šťáhlavy) is a Czech handball player who competed for Czechoslovakia in the 1972 Summer Olympics and in the 1976 Summer Olympics.

He was part of the Czechoslovak team which won the silver medal at the Munich Games. He played all six matches and scored eleven goals.

Four years later he was a member of the Czechoslovak team which finished seventh. He played four matches and scored six goals.
