= Jan Jonsson (handballer) =

Swedish handball player (born 1948)

Personal information
- Full name: Jan Lennart Jonsson
- Nationality: Swedish
- Born: 8 August 1948 (age 78)

Sport
- Sport: Handball
- Current club: Retired

Youth career
- Years: Team
- –1967: IF Saab

Senior clubs
- Years: Team
- 1967–1969: IF Saab
- 1969–1971: IF Guif
- 1971–1974: IF Saab
National team
Years	Team	Apps	(Gls)
1969–1974	Sweden	36	(72)

Jan "Lill-Blöta" Jonsson (born 8 August 1948 in Linköping, Sweden) is a Swedish former handball player who competed in the 1972 Summer Olympics.

In 1972 he was part of the Swedish team which finished seventh in the Olympic tournament. He played three matches and scored six goals.

At club level he played for IF Saab and IF Guif. With IF Saab he won the Swedish Championship in 1968, 1973 and 1974.
