= Mohamed Klai =

Tunisian handball player

Personal information
- Nationality: Tunisian
- Born: 25 February 1953 (age 72)

Sport
- Sport: Handball

Mohamed Klai (born 25 February 1953) is a Tunisian handball player. He competed in the men's tournament at the 1972 Summer Olympics.
