= Albert Oganezov =

Soviet handball player

Albert Oganezov (Russian: Альберт Оганезов, February 10, 1949 – December 29, 2002) was a Russian handball player who competed for the Soviet Union in the 1972 Summer Olympics.

In 1972 he was part of the Soviet team which finished fifth in the Olympic tournament. He played one match.
