= Sandor Rivnyak =

American handball player (1937–2020)

Personal information
- Born: October 31, 1937
- Died: January 22, 2020
- Nationality: United States

Sandor Rivnyak (Hungarian: Sándor Rivnyák; October 31, 1937 – January 22, 2020) was an American former handball player who competed in the 1972 Summer Olympics and in the 1976 Summer Olympics. He was born in Dunaföldvár, Hungary. In 1972, he was part of the American team which finished 14th in the Olympic tournament. He played all five matches. Four years later, he finished tenth with the American team in the 1976 Olympic tournament. He played all five matches again. He played for the Adelphi University.
