= Marin Dan =

Romanian handball player (born 1948)

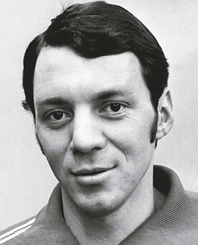

Personal information
- Born: 30 August 1948 (age 77) Ștefănești, Călărași County, Romania
- Height: 185 cm (6 ft 1 in)
- Weight: 81 kg (179 lb)

Sport
- Sport: Handball
- Club: Dinamo Bucharest
Medal record
Representing Romania
Olympic Games
Bronze medal – third place	1972 Munich	Team
World Championship
Gold medal – first place	1974 East Germany	Team

Marin Dan (born 30 August 1948) is a retired Romanian handball player. He earned 98 caps for the national team and scored 160 goals, winning the world title in 1974 and an Olympic bronze medal in 1972. After retiring from competitions he worked for the Securitate in a counterintelligence unit. He is married to the Olympic fencer Aurora Dan.
