= Richard Abrahamson =

American handball player

Personal information
- Born: October 21, 1947 (age 79) McMinnville, Oregon, United States

Sport
- Sport: Handball

Richard Neal Abrahamson (born October 21, 1947) is an American former handball player who competed in the 1972 Summer Olympics and in the 1976 Summer Olympics.

He was born in McMinnville, Oregon.

He attended the University of Oregon and captained its basketball team in his senior year. Afterwards, he joined the U.S. Army and served in the 2nd Infantry, 8th Army as a first lieutenant in South Korea. He returned home and worked as an insurance agent, working for Fullerton Insurance Agency and Brown & Brown while living in Portland, Oregon.

In 1972 he was part of the American team which finished 14th in the Olympic tournament. He played all five matches and scored 24 goals.

Four years later he finished tenth with the American team in the 1976 Olympic tournament. He played all five matches and scored 24 goals again.
