= Bertil Söderberg =

Swedish handball player (born 1947)

Bertil Lennart Söderberg (born 10 June 1947) is a Swedish former handball player who competed in the 1972 Summer Olympics.

== Clubs ==
Born in Gothenburg, Bertil Söderberg played handboll in Västra Frölunda IF from 1965 to 1973. In 1970 the club advanced to the highest Swedish league. After two years in "Allsvenskan" he shifted club to IFK Lidingö where he played for five or six seasons. He changed club to SOIK Hellas but only for two seasons. His last club were GF Kroppskultur.

== National team ==
Bertil Söderberg played 88 matches for the national team 1967 to 1977. First match in National team 9 April 1967 on Island against Island. Last match 30 October 1977 against Danmark. In 1972 he was part of the Swedish team which finished seventh in the Olympic tournament. He played five matches and scored six goals.
