= Dennis Berkholtz =

American basketball and handball player

Personal information
- Full name: Dennis Lee Berkholtz
- Born: January 19, 1945 (age 81) United States

Sport
- Sport: Handball

Dennis Lee Berkholtz (born January 19, 1945) is an American former basketball and handball player who competed in the 1972 Summer Olympics.

== Basketball ==
Berkholtz was born in Appleton, Wisconsin. He played basketball at Whitefish Bay High School in Whitefish Bay, Wisconsin. He was a first-team selection to United Press International's all-state basketball team as a junior, but fell to the third team his senior season due to injuries. He was a member of the Kansas State Wildcats men's basketball team from 1963 to 1967 and averaged 9.2 points and 3.1 rebounds over 75 varsity games. In 1968, he played for the National Alliance of Basketball Leagues and FIBA Intercontinental Cup champion Akron Goodyear Wingfoots. In 1970, he played for the Columbia Sertoma Basketball Club.

== Handball ==
In 1972, Berkholtz was part of the American team which finished 14th in the Olympic tournament. He played three matches and scored six goals. He was coach of the US at the 1976 Olympics.

== Effort to bring the Olympics to Atlanta ==
In 1976, Berkholtz started a campaign for Atlanta to bid for the 1984 Summer Olympics. The campaign struggled to gain support from local political and business leaders, in part because of the negative experiences attached to recent Olympics: a massacre of protesters ahead of Mexico City 1968, the killings of athletes at Munich 1972, and the large debts incurred in the wake of Montreal 1976. A feasibility study by a local public policy group concluded that hosting the Olympics would be financially risky, and Coca-Cola CEO J. Paul Austin (who had competed in rowing at the 1936 Summer Olympics in Berlin) urged his fellow Atlanta elites to oppose the bid. Without support from Mayor Maynard Jackson or the Atlanta Chamber of Commerce, the bid was withdrawn in July 1977.
