= František Brůna =

Czech handball player

Medal record

Men's handball

Representing Czechoslovakia

Olympic Games
Silver medal – second place	1972 Munich	Team competition

World Championship
Bronze medal – third place	1964 Czechoslovakia	Team competition
Gold medal – first place	1967 Sweden	Team competition

František Brůna (13 October 1944 in Dolní Kralovice – 24 April 2017) was a Czech handball player who competed for Czechoslovakia in the 1972 Summer Olympics.

He was part of the Czechoslovak team which won the silver medal at the Munich Games. He played two matches and scored three goals.

Before that, he won the bronze medal at 1964 World Championship and gold medal at 1967 World Championship.

He died in April 2017 in Benešov at age of 72.
