= Vladimír Haber =

Czechoslovak handball player

Personal information
- Born: 26 August 1949 (age 77) Plzeň, Czechoslovakia
- Height: 1.79 m (5 ft 10 1/2 in)

Sport
- Sport: Handball

Teams managed
- Years: Team
- 1996: Czech Republic
- 2002–2004: Czech Republic
- 2012–2014: Czech Republic
Medal record
Men's Handball
Silver medal – second place	1972 Munich	Team competition

Vladimír Haber (born 26 August 1949) is a Czechoslovak handball player and coach. As a player he competed in the 1972 Summer Olympics and in the 1976 Summer Olympics.

Haber was born in Plzeň and played for Škoda Plzeň. He was part of the Czechoslovak team which won the silver medal at the Munich Games. He played five matches including the final and scored five goals.

Four years later he was a member of the Czechoslovak team which finished seventh. He played all five matches and scored nine goals.

As a coach he has coached the Czech national team on three occasions, in 1996, from 2002 to 2004 and from 2012 to 2014.
