= Johan Fischerström =

Swedish handball player (1944-2016)

Johan Fischerström (15 September 1944 in Malmö – 28 September 2016) was a Swedish handball player who competed in the 1972 Summer Olympics. In 1974 he was named Swedish Handballer of the Year.

In 1972 he was part of the Swedish team which finished seventh in the Olympic tournament. He played three matches and scored three goals.
