= Klaus Westebbe =

German handball player (born 1949)

Klaus Westebbe (born September 30, 1949) is a former West German handball player who competed in the 1972 Summer Olympics.

In 1972 he was part of the West German team which finished sixth in the Olympic tournament. He played three matches and scored six goals.
