= Zdeněk Škára =

Czechoslovak handball player (1950–2010)

Olympic medal record

Men's Handball
Silver medal – second place	1972 Munich	Team competition

Zdeněk Škára (23 February 1950 – 21 October 2010) was a Czechoslovak handball player who competed in the 1972 Summer Olympics.

Škára was born in Olomouc in February 1950. He was part of the Czechoslovak team which won the silver medal at the Munich Games. He played one match. He died in Olomouc on 21 October 2010, at the age of 60.
