= Aleya Hamrouni =

Tunisian handball player

Personal information
- Nationality: Tunisian
- Born: 12 December 1945 (age 79)

Sport
- Sport: Handball

Aleya Hamrouni (born 12 December 1945) is a Tunisian handball player. He competed in the men's tournament at the 1972 Summer Olympics. With the national team, he won the African Cup in 1974, which was the first edition of the tournament. In the domestic league he played for Club Africain (handball) and won multiple Tunisian league and cup titles.

== Honors ==
=== With Club Africain ===
- Tunisian Handball League (3)
  - Champion: 1965, 1968, 1970
- Tunisian Cup (6)
  - Winner: 1964, 1965, 1966, 1967, 1968, 1969

=== National team ===
- African Men's Handball Championship (1)
  - Sieger: 1974
