= Karsten Sørensen =

Danish handball player (born 1948)

Personal information
- Full name: Karsten Steen Sørensen
- Nationality: Danish
- Born: 1 February 1948 (age 78) Aarhus, Denmark
- Height: 1.86 m (6 ft 1 in)

Sport
- Sport: Handball
- Current club: Retired

Senior clubs
- Years: Team
- 1968–1969: AGF Håndbold
- 1972–1975: Århus KFUM
National team
Years	Team	Apps	(Gls)
1968–1975	Denmark	21	(33)

Karsten Steen Sørensen (born February 4, 1948) is a Danish former handball player who competed in the 1972 Summer Olympics.

He played his club handball with Aarhus KFUM. In 1972 he was part of the Denmark men's national handball team which finished thirteenth in the 1972 Olympic tournament. He played two matches and scored five goals.
