= Helmut Pniociński =

Polish handball player (1944-1973)

Helmut Wojciech Pniociński (22 February 1944 – 1973) was a Polish handball player who competed in the 1972 Summer Olympics.

He was born in Chorzów.

In 1972 he was part of the Polish team which finished tenth in the Olympic tournament. He played four matches.
