= Miroslav Pribanić =

Croatian handball player (1946–2026)

Olympic medal record

Men's Handball
Gold medal – first place	1972 Munich	Team competition
Gold medal – first place	1975 Algers	Team competition
Bronze medal – third place	1970 France	Team competition

Miroslav Pribanić, nicknamed "Raban" (22 June 1946 – 2 July 2026) was a Croatian handball player who competed for Bjelovar handball club and Yugoslav national team, winning gold medal at the 1972 Summer Olympics and bronze medal at the 1970 World Championship. He played as a right wing. Together with Ivan Đuranec, he was author of the "zeppelin" move.

== Life and career ==
Pribanić was born in Bjelovar on 22 June 1946.

He played for Croatian squads Željezničar (1958–63) and Partizan from Bjelovar (1963–77), that ruled Croatian, Yugoslav and European handball in the 1970s. He played more than 700 matches for Bjelovar, winning Yugoslav championship six times (1967–68, 1970–72, 1977), two Yugoslav cups (1968, 1976) and European Cup in 1972. Pribanić scored more than 2600 goals in the career.

He was part of the Yugoslav team which won the gold medal at the Munich Games. He played all six matches and scored twelve goals. During his representative career (1966–75), he played 125 matches and scored 273 goals for the Yugoslavia. He also won gold medal at the 1975 Mediterranean Games.

Pribanić died on 2 July 2026, ten days after his 80th birthday.
