= Vagn Nielsen =

Danish handball player (born 1943)

Vagn Harris Nielsen (born 28 November 1943) is a Danish former handball player who competed in the 1972 Summer Olympics.

He played club handball with Bolbro GF. In 1972 he was part of the Denmark men's national handball team which finished thirteenth in the Olympic tournament. He played three matches.
