= Sten Osther =

Norwegian handball player (born 1948)

Sten Werner Osther (born 14 March 1948) is a retired Norwegian handball player who competed in the 1972 Summer Olympics.

He was born in Fredrikstad and represented the club Bækkelagets SK. In 1972 he was part of the Norwegian team which finished ninth in the Olympic tournament. He played three matches and scored six goals.
