= Jānis Vilsons =

Soviet handball player (1944 – 2018)

- Born: 10 January 1944; Beja, Alūksne Municipality, Latvian SSR, Soviet Union
- Died: 18 January 2018 (aged 74); Riga, Latvia
- Occupation: handball player

Jānis Vilsons (10 January 1944 – 18 January 2018) was a Soviet former handball player who competed for the Soviet Union in the 1972 Summer Olympics.

In 1972 he was part of the Soviet team which finished fifth in the Olympic tournament. He played three matches.
