= František Králík =

Czech handball player (1942–1974)

Olympic medal record

Men's Handball
Silver medal – second place	1972 Munich	Team competition

František Králík (12 April 1942 in Zlín – 7 September 1974 in Hranice) was a Czech handball player who competed for Czechoslovakia in the 1972 Summer Olympics.

He was part of the Czechoslovak team which won the silver medal at the Munich Games. He played four matches as goalkeeper.
