= Hans-Peter Neuhaus =

German handball player (born 1945)

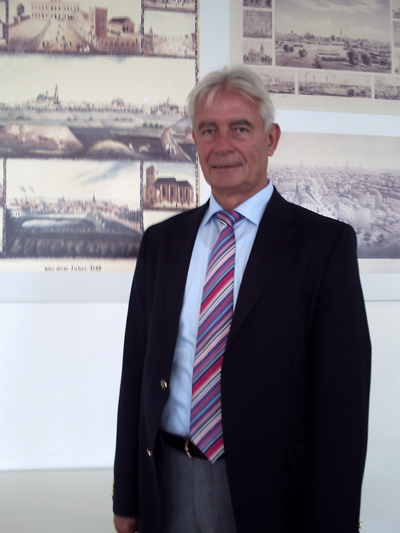
Hans-Peter Neuhaus (2007)

Hans-Peter Neuhaus (born 18 June 1945) is a former West German handball player who competed in the 1972 Summer Olympics.

He was born in Stebbach, district of Heilbronn.

In 1972 he was part of the West German team which finished sixth in the Olympic tournament. He played all six matches and scored two goals.
