= Ulf Magnussen =

Norwegian handball player (born 1946)

Ulf Magnussen (born 18 November 1946) is a retired Norwegian handball player who competed in the 1972 Summer Olympics.

He was born in Oslo and represented the clubs Refstad IL and Notodden HL. In 1972 he was part of the Norwegian team which finished ninth in the Olympic tournament. He played one match, the group match against Romania.
