= Javier García (handballer) =

Spanish handball player (1947–2025)

Javier García Cuesta (20 April 1947 – 28 September 2025) was a Spanish handball coach and player who competed in the 1972 Summer Olympics.

== Biography ==
García was born in Mieres on 20 April 1947. In 1972, he was part of the Spanish team which finished 15th in the Olympic tournament. He played two matches and scored one goal.

Garcia worked as the Team Handball Coach of the Brazilian National Team. He held the position of head coach for the United States men's national team from 2014 until 2018, when he was replaced by Robert Hedin.

García died in Gijón on 28 September 2025, at the age of 78.
