= Heiner Möller =

German handball player (born 1948)

Personal information
- Nationality: German
- Born: 3 September 1948 (age 78) Herford, West German

Sport
- Sport: Handball
- Position: Right wing

Senior clubs
- Years: Team
- –1966: ATV Dortmund-Dorstfeld
- 1966–1970: TuS Eintracht Dortmund
- 1970–1974: TuS Wellinghofen
- 1974–1978: TuS Nettelstedt
- 1978–1981: TuS Wellinghofen
- 1981–1983: OSC Dortmund
- 1983–1984: TuS Eintracht Dortmund
National team
Years	Team	Apps	(Gls)
1968–1976	Germany	95	(193)

Heiner Möller (born 3 September 1948) is a West German former handball player who competed in the 1972 Summer Olympics.

== Career ==
Heiner Möller began his sports career as an athlete at ATV Dortmund-Dorstfeld. He then moved within the club to the handball department. In 1966 he went to the then regional league club TuS Eintracht Dortmund. The regional league was the second division in German handball at the time. In 1970 he switched to the first division club TuS Wellinghofen, where he stayed until 1974. He then moved to the financially strong regional league TuS Nettelstedt and stayed there until 1978 before he went back to Wellinghofen in the regional league. In 1981 he moved again to OSC Dortmund in the first division and in 1983 to TSC Eintracht Dortmund, where he stayed until 1984.

For the Germany national team, of which he was captain for many years, he played a total of 95 international matches from 1968 to 1976, in which he scored 193 goals. Möller took part in the 1970 World Championships in France and in East Germany in 1974. The highlight of his career was participation in the 1972 Olympic Games in Munich they finished sixth. He played three matches and scored eight goals. The national coach at the time, Vlado Stenzel, threw Möller out of the national team in 1974 because he moved to the regional league club TuS Nettelstedt. He was denied participation in the 1976 Olympic Games in Montreal.

Heiner Möller worked as a teacher at the Max Planck High School in Dortmund until 2012.

== Career as a photographer ==
After his career as a handball player, the qualified sports teacher began photography in 1988 and became a successful amateur photographer. In 1994 and 2004 he became North German Photo Champion. In 1995, 2000, 2001, 2004 and 2005, he won the Dürrich Prize as the most successful amateur photographer from the Westphalia State Association.
