= Roland Gunnesch =

Romanian handball player (born 1944)

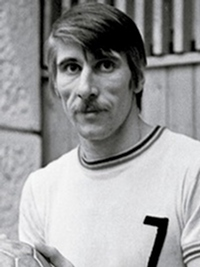

Personal information
- Born: 25 March 1944 (age 82) Daia, Romania
- Height: 197 cm (6 ft 6 in)
- Weight: 95 kg (209 lb)

Sport
- Sport: Handball
- Club: Politehnica Timişoara
Medal record
Representing Romania
Olympic Games
Bronze medal – third place	1972 Munich	Team
Silver medal – second place	1976 Montreal	Team
World Championships
Bronze medal – third place	1967 Sweden	Team
Gold medal – first place	1970 France	Team
Gold medal – first place	1974 East Germany	Team

Roland Gunnesch (sometimes spelled Gunesch or Guneș; born 25 March 1944) is a retired Romanian handball player of German ethnicity. During his career he earned 170 caps with the national team and scored 252 goals, winning the world title in 1970 and 1974 and Olympic medals in 1972 and 1976.

He was discovered as a handball talent by Hans Zultner, his physical education teacher at high school in Sighișoara, and after graduating went to play for Politehnica Timişoara. After retiring from competitions he became a handball coach and manager. He was assistant coach for Politehnica Timişoara in 1983–1991 and managed the Romanian University national team that won the World University Games in 1987. After that he immigrated to Germany.

Gunnesch is married and has a daughter.
