= Jiří Kavan =

Czechoslovak handball player

Olympic medal record

Men's handball
| Silver medal – second place | 1972 Munich | Team competition |

Jiří Kavan (11 December 1943 – 14 June 2010) was a Czechoslovak handball player who competed in the 1972 and 1976 Summer Olympics.

He was born in Olomouc, and represented Dukla Praha. He was part of the Czechoslovak team which won the silver medal at the Munich Games. He played all six matches and scored fifteen goals. Four years later he was a member of the Czechoslovak team which finished seventh. He played four matches and scored nine goals.
