= Jon Reinertsen =

Norwegian handball player (born 1946)

Jon Reinert Reinertsen (born 23 March 1946) is a retired Norwegian handball player who competed in the 1972 Summer Olympics.

He was born in Oslo. In 1972, he was part of the Norwegian team which finished ninth in the Olympic tournament. He played four matches and scored 13 goals. He was capped 113 times in total, between 1964 and 1976.

He represented the club Fredensborg IL from 1965 to 1982, and also played for Kragerø IF, Stabæk IF, Oppsal IF, Haslum IL, Reistad IL and Drammen HK. He later became a coach.
