= Horst Jankhöfer =

German handball player (born 1942)

Horst Jankhöfer (born 26 January 1942 in Sandersdorf, Saxony-Anhalt) is a former East German handball player who competed in the 1972 Summer Olympics.

In 1972 he was part of the East German team which finished fourth in the Olympic tournament. He played four matches and scored five goals.
