= Moncef Loueslati =

Tunisian handball player

Personal information
- Nationality: Tunisian
- Born: 28 November 1943 (age 82)

Sport
- Sport: Handball

Moncef Loueslati (born 28 November 1943) is a Tunisian handball player. He competed in the men's tournament at the 1972 Summer Olympics.
