= Göran Hård af Segerstad =

Swedish handball player (born 1945)

Göran Hård af Segerstad (born 31 March 1945 in Karlstad, Sweden) is a Swedish former handball player who competed in the 1972 Summer Olympics.

In 1972 he was part of the Swedish team which finished seventh in the Olympic tournament. He played five matches and scored three goals.
