= Sporthalle Augsburg =

Indoor arena in Augsburg, Germany

Coordinates: 48°21′23″N 10°52′48″E

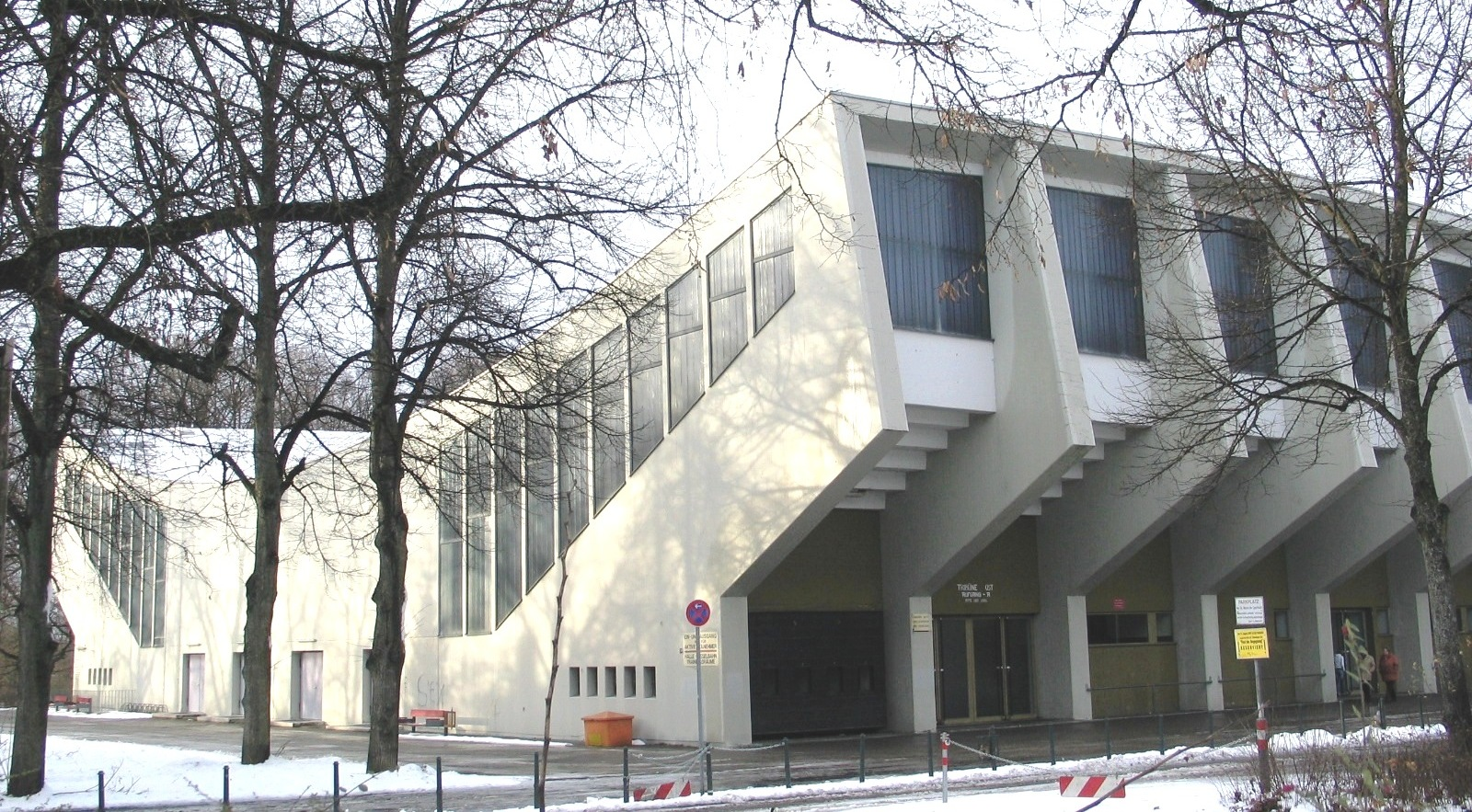
Sporthalle Augsburg

Sporthalle Augsburg is an indoor arena located in Augsburg, Germany. Completed in 1965, it hosted six team handball matches for the 1972 Summer Olympics in neighboring Munich.
