= Arnošt Klimčík =

Czech handball player (1945–2015)

Olympic medal record

Men's Handball
Silver medal – second place	1972 Munich	Team competition

Arnošt Klimčík (24 July 1945 in Karviná – 21 March 2015) was a Czech handball player who competed for Czechoslovakia in the 1972 Summer Olympics.

He was part of the Czechoslovak team which won the silver medal at the Munich Games. He played one match.

On a club level Klimčík played for HC Baník Karviná.
