= Hans-Jürgen Bode =

German handball player (1941–2022)

Hans-Jürgen Bode (27 June 1941 – 6 October 2022) was a West German handball player who competed in the 1972 Summer Olympics.

In 1972 he was part of the West German team which finished sixth in the Olympic tournament. He played three matches as goalkeeper.

Bode died on 6 October 2022 following a short illness.
