= Nikolay Semyonov (handballer) =

Russian handball player

Personal information
- Nationality: Russian
- Born: 30 October 1940 (age 84)

Sport
- Sport: Handball

Nikolay Semyonov (born 30 October 1940) is a Russian handball player. He competed in the men's tournament at the 1972 Summer Olympics.
