= Nebojša Popović (handballer) =

Serbian handball player (born 1947)

Medal record

Men's handball

Representing Yugoslavia

Olympic Games
Gold medal – first place	1972 Munich	Team competition

Nebojša Popović (Serbian Cyrillic: Небојша Поповић, born 28 April 1947 in Prijedor) is a Bosnian Serb former handball player who competed for Yugoslavia in the 1972 Summer Olympics and in the 1976 Summer Olympics.

He was part of the Yugoslav team which won the gold medal at the Munich Games. He played all six matches and scored eleven goals.

Four years later he was a member of the Yugoslav team which finished fifth in the Olympic tournament. He played all six matches and scored fourteen goals.
