= Fernando de Andrés =

Spanish handball player (born 1949)

Fernando de Andrés Asín (born April 23, 1949 in Zaragoza) is a former Spanish handball player who competed in the 1972 Summer Olympics.

In 1972 he was part of the Spanish team which finished fifteenth in the Olympic tournament. He played three matches and scored nine goals.
