= Robert Zawada =

Polish handball player (1944–2024)

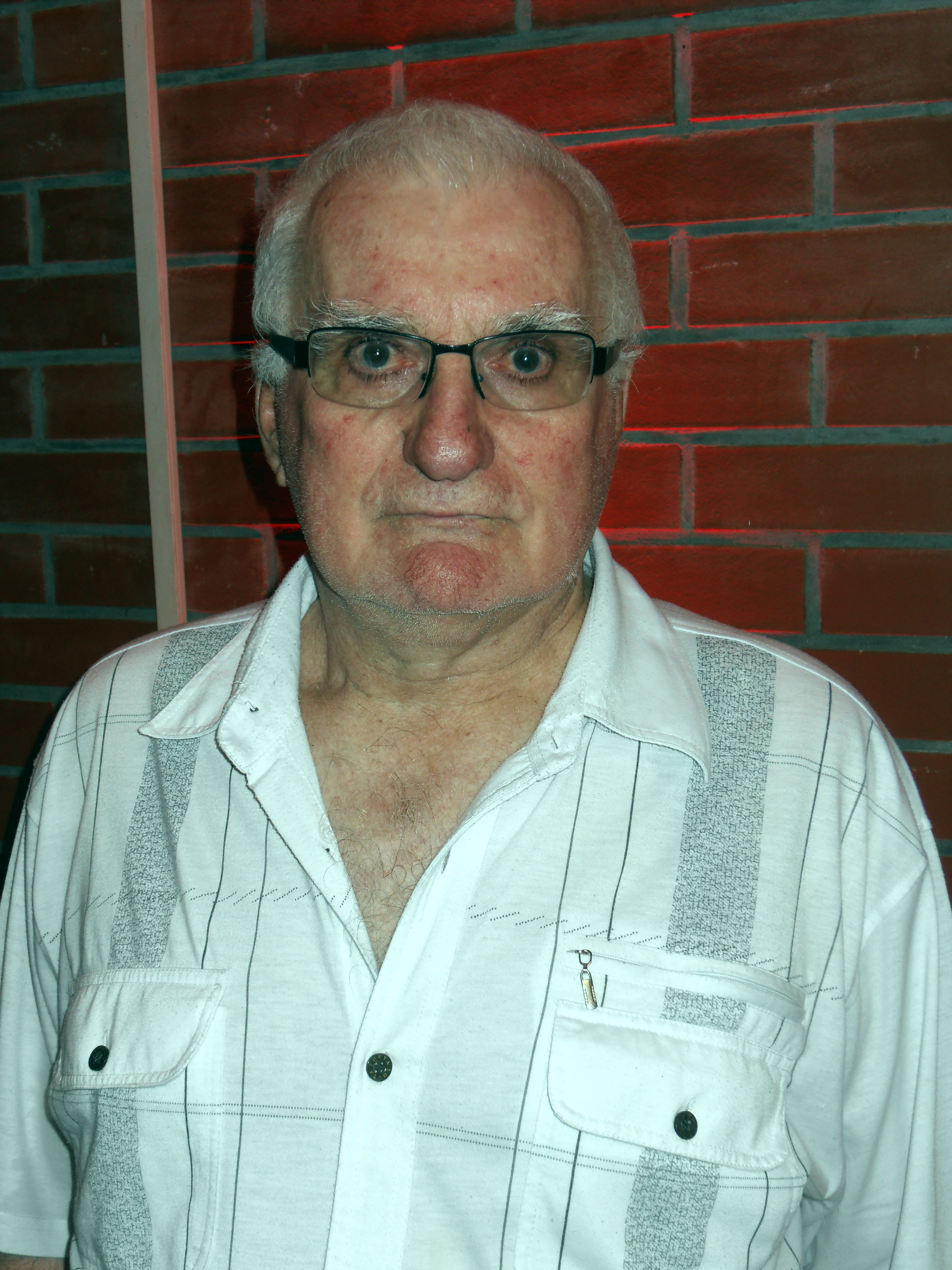

Robert Paweł Zawada (7 June 1944 – 5 May 2024) was a Polish handball player who competed in the 1972 Summer Olympics.

In 1972, he was part of the Polish team which finished tenth in the Olympic tournament. He played two matches and scored three goals.

Zawada died on 5 May 2023, at the age of 79.
