= Peter Bucher =

West German handball player (1947–2019)

Peter Bucher (April 3, 1947 – May 3, 2019) was a West German handball player who competed in the 1972 Summer Olympics. In 1972 he was part of the West German team which finished sixth in the Olympic tournament. He played all six matches and scored twenty goals.
