= Reiner Ganschow =

German handball player (born 1945)

Reiner Ganschow (born 22 June 1945) is an East German former handball player who competed in the 1972 Summer Olympics.

He was born in Rostock, and played for SC Empor Rostock.

In 1972 he was part of the East German team which finished fourth in the Olympic tournament. He played all six matches and scored 20 goals.

He was the topscorer of the DDR Oberliga twice; in 1966–67 and 1967–68.
