= Benny Johansson =

Swedish handball player (born 1947)

Personal information
- Full name: Carl Rune Benny Johansson
- Born: 8 May 1947 (age 79); Gothenburg, Sweden
- Nationality: Swedish
- Height: 6 ft 2 in (1.88 m)
- Playing position: Back

Senior clubs
- Years: Team
- –1972: Västra Frölunda IF
- 1972–1973: SoIK Hellas
- 1973–1976: Västra Frölunda IF

Benny Johansson (born 8 May 1947) is a Swedish former handball player who competed in the 1972 Summer Olympics.

In 1972, he was part of the Swedish team which finished seventh in the Olympic tournament. He played all six matches and scored eight goals.

At club level he played for Västra Frölunda IF and SoIK Hellas. With Västra Frölunds IF he won the Swedish outdoor Championship in 1970 and silver medals in 1971 and with SoIK Hellas he won both the indoor and outdoor championship in 1972.
