= Donauhalle Ulm =

Indoor arena in Ulm, Germany

Donauhalle Ulm (English: Danube Hall Ulm) is a multi-purpose indoor arena located in Ulm, Germany. The venue hosted four team handball matches for the 1972 Summer Olympics that were held in neighboring Munich.

Donauhalle also plays hosts to music concerts and conventions.
