= Vladimír Jarý =

Czechoslovak handball player

Olympic medal record

Men's Handball
Silver medal – second place	1972 Munich	Team competition

Vladimír Jarý (born 2 January 1947 in Litvínov) is a Czechoslovak handball player who competed in the 1972 Summer Olympics and in the 1976 Summer Olympics.

He was part of the Czechoslovak team which won the silver medal at the Munich Games. He played all six matches and scored ten goals.

Four years later he was a member of the Czechoslovak team which finished seventh. He played all five matches and scored seven goals.
