= Mohamed Sebabti =

Tunisian handball player

Personal information
- Nationality: Tunisian
- Born: 6 May 1949 (age 75)

Sport
- Sport: Handball

Mohamed Faouzi Sebabti (born 6 May 1949) is a Tunisian handball player. He competed in the men's tournament at the 1972 Summer Olympics.
