= Jaroslav Škarvan =

Czechoslovak handball player (1944–2022)

Olympic medal record

Men's Handball
Silver medal – second place	1972 Munich	Team competition

Jaroslav Škarvan (3 April 1944 – 21 June 2022) was a Czechoslovak handball player who competed in the 1972 Summer Olympics.

He was part of the Czechoslovak team which won the silver medal at the Munich Games. He played three matches as goalkeeper.
