= Harry Zörnack =

German handball player (born 1939)

Harry Zörnack (born 8 March 1939) is an East German former handball player who competed in the 1972 Summer Olympics.

He was born in the Free City of Danzig.

In 1972 he was part of the East German team which finished fourth in the Olympic tournament. He played all six matches.
