= Ladislav Beneš =

Czech handball player

Personal information
- Nationality: Czech (Czechoslovakia)
- Born: 9 July 1943 (age 83) Zlín, Czechoslovakia
- Height: 181 cm (71 in)

Sport
- Sport: Handball
National team
- Years: Team
- –: Czechoslovakia
Medal record
Olympic Games
| Silver medal – second place | 1972 Munich | Team competition |
World Championship
| Silver medal – second place | Czechoslovakia 1964 |
| Gold medal – first place | Sweden 1967 |

Ladislav Beneš (born 9 July 1943 in Zlín) is a Czech handball player who competed in the 1972 Summer Olympics.

He was part of the Czechoslovak team which won the silver medal at the Munich Games. He played all six matches and scored fourteen goals.
