= Claus From =

Danish handball player (born 1945)

Claus Jørgen From (born 26 June 1945) is a Danish former handball player who competed in the 1972 Summer Olympics and in the 1976 Summer Olympics. He played his club handball for IF Stjernen.

In 1972 he was part of the Danish team which finished thirteenth in the Olympic tournament. He played four matches and scored six goals. Four years later he finished eighth with the Danish team in the 1976 Olympic tournament. He played all six matches and scored six goals.

After his playing career he has been involved in educating handball coaches, especially goalkeeping coaches.

Besides handball, From also played soccer and had 23 senior appearances for B1909.
