= Herwig Ahrendsen =

German handball player (born 1948)

Herwig Ahrendsen (born March 1, 1948, in Husum, Schleswig-Holstein) is a former West German handball player who competed in the 1972 Summer Olympics.

In 1972 he was part of the West German team which finished sixth in the Olympic tournament. He played five matches and scored two goals.
