= Josef Karrer =

German handball player (born 1939)

Josef Karrer (born 3 March 1939) is a West German former handball player who competed in the 1972 Summer Olympics.

He was born in Großwallstadt.

In 1972 he was part of the West German team which finished sixth in the Olympic tournament. He played two matches and scored four goals.
