= Per Søderstrøm =

Norwegian handball player (born 1943)

Per Ståle Søderstrøm (born 20 April 1943) is a retired Norwegian handball player who competed in the 1972 Summer Olympics.

He was born in Oslo and represented the club SK Arild. In 1972 he was part of the Norwegian team which finished ninth in the Olympic tournament. He played three matches.
