= Đorđe Lavrnić =

Yugoslav handball player

Personal information
- Full name: Đorđe Lavrnić
- Nationality: Yugoslav/Serbian
- Born: 6 June 1946 Komić, FPR Yugoslavia
- Died: 27 November 2010 (aged 64) Doboj, Bosnia and Herzegovina
- Height: 1.92 m (6 ft 4 in)

Sport
- Sport: Handball
- Position: Right back

Senior clubs
- Years: Team
- –: Slatina
- –: Krivaja Zavidovići
- –: Crvenka
- 1975–1978: TuS Derschlag
- –: VfL Günzburg
- –: Sloga Doboj
National team
- Years: Team
- –: Yugoslavia
Medal record
Men's handball
Representing Yugoslavia
Olympic Games
Gold medal – first place	1972 Munich	Team
World Championship
Bronze medal – third place	1970 Paris	Team
Bronze medal – third place	1974 East Germany	Team

Đorđe "Đoko" Lavrnić (Serbian Cyrillic: Ђорђе Ђоко Лаврнић; 6 June 1946 – 27 November 2010) was a Yugoslav handball player who competed in the 1972 Summer Olympics.

== Club career ==
After starting out at Slatina, Lavrnić played for Krivaja Zavidovići and Crvenka, before moving abroad to Germany. He spent three seasons with TuS Derschlag in the Handball-Bundesliga (1975–1978), finishing as the league's top scorer each year. Later on, Lavrnić would play for VfL Günzburg, before returning to Yugoslavia and joining Sloga Doboj.

== International career ==
At international level, Lavrnić competed for Yugoslavia at the 1972 Summer Olympics, winning the gold medal. He also participated in two World Championships (1970 and 1974), bringing home a bronze medal on both occasions.
