= Jørgen Vodsgaard =

Danish handball player (born 1942)

Jørgen Vodsgaard (born October 22, 1942) is a Danish former handball player who competed in the 1972 Summer Olympics. He played his club handball with Aarhus KFUM. He was 1.91 meters and played as a playmaker.

In addition to handball he also played basketball at Skovbakken.

He was a leading figure in the 1967 World Championship Silver winning Denmark men's national handball team. In 1972 he was part of the Danish team which finished thirteenth in the Olympic tournament. He played four matches and scored six goals.

Also known as the co-founder and CEO of Danish-based sportswear brand Hummel A/S (Hummel International Sport and Leisure), which he started together with fellow handball player Max Nielsen.
