= Engelbert Szolc =

Polish handball player (born 1943)

Engelbert Henryk Szolc (born 26 April 1943) is a Polish former handball player who competed in the 1972 Summer Olympics.

He was born in Ruda Śląska.

In 1972 he was part of the Polish team which finished tenth in the Olympic tournament. He played all five matches and scored eleven goals.
