= László Harka =

Hungarian handball player (born 1945)

László Harka (born 23 November 1945) is a Hungarian former handball player who competed in the 1972 Summer Olympics.

He was born in Békésszentandrás.

In 1972 he was part of the Hungarian team which finished eighth in the Olympic tournament. He played four matches and scored one goal.
