= Taoufik Djemail =

Tunisian handball player

Personal information
- Nationality: Tunisian
- Born: 30 May 1948 (age 76)

Sport
- Sport: Handball

Taoufik Djemail (born 30 May 1948) is a Tunisian handball player. He competed in the men's tournament at the 1972 Summer Olympics.
