= Herbert Wehnert =

German handball player (born 1947)

Herbert Wehnert (born April 28, 1947 in Wiesbaden) is a former West German handball player who competed in the 1972 Summer Olympics.

In 1972 he was part of the West German team which finished sixth in the Olympic tournament. He played five matches and scored twelve goals.
