= Kay Jørgensen =

Danish handball player (born 1946)

Kay Sloth Friis Jørgensen (born February 18, 1946) is a Danish former handball player who competed in the 1972 Summer Olympics and in the 1976 Summer Olympics. In 1979 he was the first player to reach 200 matches for the Danish men's national team.

He played his club handball with IF Stjernen. In 1972 he was part of the Denmark men's national handball team which finished thirteenth in the Olympic tournament. He played three matches as goalkeeper. Four years later he finished eighth with the Danish team in the 1976 Olympic tournament. He played all six matches as goalkeeper.
