= Jan Økseter =

Norwegian handball player (born 1945)

Jan Økseter (born 19 February 1945 in Aurdal, Oppland) is a retired Norwegian handball player who competed in the 1972 Summer Olympics.

He was born in Aurdal and represented the club Elverum IL. In 1972, he was part of the Norwegian team which finished ninth in the Olympic tournament. He played three matches.
