= Włodzimierz Wachowicz =

Polish handball player (born 1946)

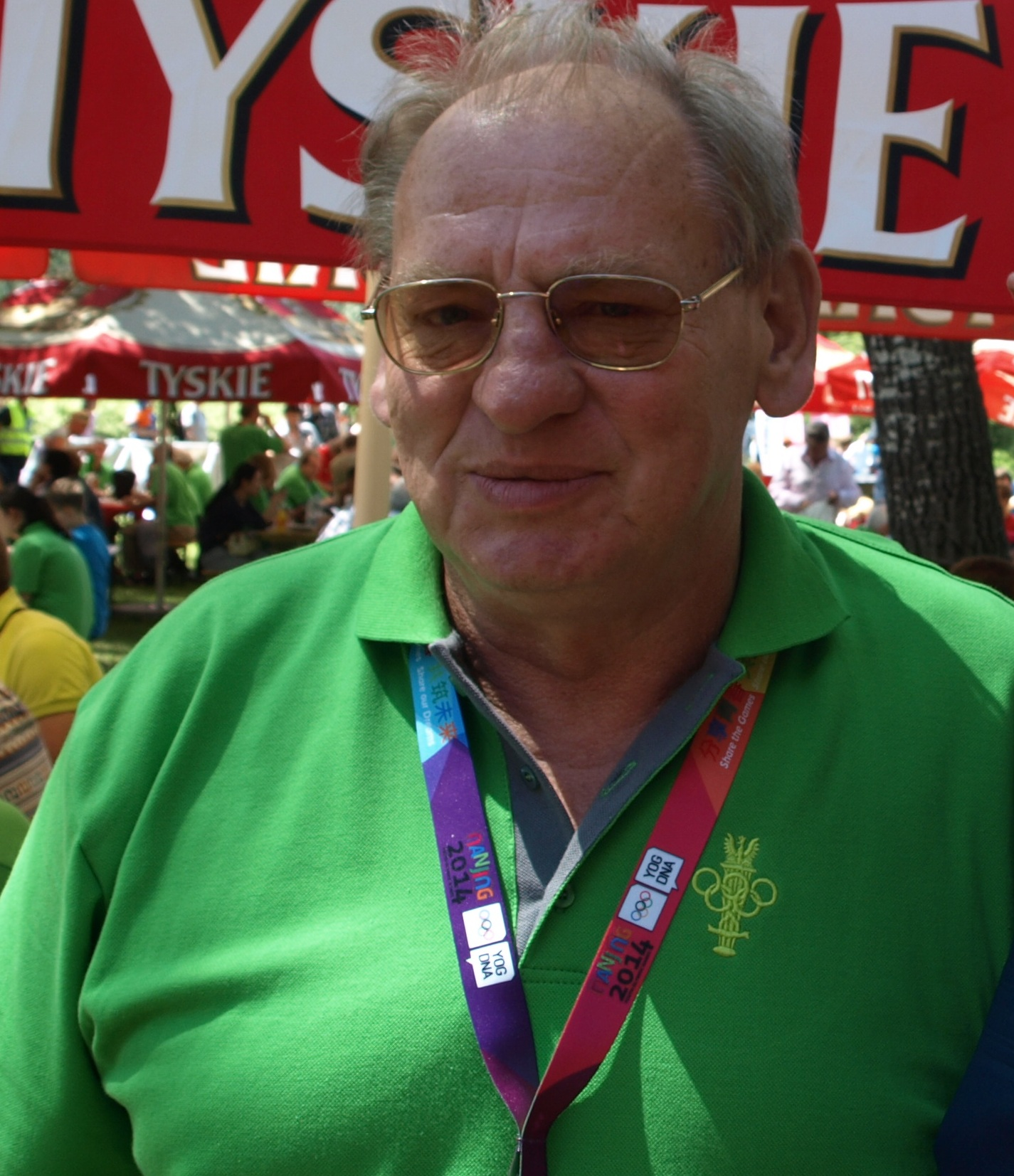
Image of Włodzimierz Wachowicz

Włodzimierz Zbigniew Wachowicz (born 23 August 1946) is a Polish former handball player who competed in the 1972 Summer Olympics.

He was born in Piotrków Trybunalski.

In 1972 he was part of the Polish team which finished tenth in the Olympic tournament. He played all five matches and scored two goals.
