= Juan Miguel Igartua =

Spanish handball player (born 1951)

Juan Miguel Igartua Narvaiza (born April 29, 1951) is a Spanish former handball player. He competed in the 1972 Summer Olympics.

In 1972 he was part of the Spanish team that finished 15th in the Olympic tournament. He played four matches.
