= Josef Rose =

German handball player (born 1943)

Josef Rose (born 16 March 1943 in Trautenau) is an East German former handball player who competed in the 1972 Summer Olympics.

In 1972 he was part of the East German team which finished fourth in the Olympic tournament. He played four matches and scored four goals.
