= Thomas Persson =

Swedish handball player (born 1947)

Personal information
- Full name: Bengt Thomas Persson
- Nationality: Sweden
- Born: 14 February 1947 (age 79) Helsingborg, Sweden

Sport
- Sport: Handball
- Position: Back

Youth career
- Years: Team
- -1966: IS Göta

Senior clubs
- Years: Team
- 1967-1968: IFK Kristianstad
- 1968-1970: IS Göta
- 1970-1974: IFK Kristianstad
- 1974-1975: IFK Malmö Handboll
- 1975-?: IK Wargo
National team
| Years | Team | Apps |
| 1967—1974 | Sweden | 68 |

Bengt Thomas Persson (born 14 February 1947) is a Swedish former handball player. He competed in the 1972 Summer Olympics held in Munich, Germany.

In 1972 he was part of the Swedish team which finished seventh in the Olympic tournament. He played four matches and scored six goals. The same year he was named Swedish Handballer of the Year.
