= Faouzi Ksouri =

Tunisian handball player

Personal information
- Nationality: Tunisian
- Born: 6 December 1948 (age 77)

Sport
- Sport: Handball

Faouzi Ksouri (born 6 December 1948) is a Tunisian handball player. He competed in the men's tournament at the 1972 Summer Olympics.
