= Wolfgang Braun =

German handball player (born 1944)

Wolfgang Braun (born 26 February 1944) is a former West German handball player who competed in the 1972 Summer Olympics.

In 1972 he was part of the West German team which finished sixth in the Olympic tournament. He played five matches and scored four goals.
