= Dan Eriksson =

Swedish handball player (born 1947)

Personal information
- Full name: Dan Gustav Eriksson
- Born: 21 May 1977 (age 49) Huddinge, Sweden

Sport
- Sport: Handball
- Position: Back

Youth career
- Years: Team
- -1966: IK Hele

Senior clubs
- Years: Team
- 1966-1980: SoIK Hellas
National team
Years	Team	Apps	(Gls)
1965–1974	Sweden	146	(170)

Dan Eriksson (born 21 May 1947) is a Swedish former handball player. He won the Swedish Handballer of the year award in 1971. He played his entire senior career at SoIK Hellas, where he won the Swedish championship 5 times; in 1969, 1970, 1971, 1972 and 1977.

He participated in three World Championships, in 1970, 1974 and 1978. He also competed in the 1972 Summer Olympics.

In 1972 he was part of the Swedish team which finished seventh in the Olympic tournament. He played all six matches and scored six goals.

In addition to handball he worked as a police officer and later as a gymnastics teacher at the Swedish School of Sport and Health Sciences.
