= Herbert Rogge =

German handball player (born 1947)

Herbert Rogge (born November 7, 1947) is a former West German handball player who competed in the 1972 Summer Olympics.

In 1972 he was part of the West German team which finished sixth in the Olympic tournament. He played five matches and scored five goals.
