= Juan Antonio Medina =

Spanish handball player (born 1946)

Juan Antonio Medina (born September 3, 1946) is a former Spanish handball player. He competed in the 1972 Summer Olympics.

In 1972 he was part of the Spanish team which finished fifteenth in the Olympic tournament. He played four matches and scored eight goals.
