= Torstein Hansen =

Norwegian handball player (1943-2018)

Torstein Sverre Hansen (27 October 1943 – 12 May 2018) was a Norwegian handball player who competed in the 1972 Summer Olympics. He was born in Oslo and represented the club Oppsal IF. In 1972 he was part of the Norwegian team which finished ninth in the Olympic tournament. He played all five matches and scored 22 goals.
