= Wolfgang Böhme =

German handball player (born 1949)

Wolfgang Böhme (born 17 December 1949) is an East German former handball player who competed in the 1972 Summer Olympics.

He was born in Wolfen. He was the husband of Ute Rührold, but they are now divorced.

In 1972 he was part of the East German team which finished fourth in the Olympic tournament. He played five matches and scored eleven goals.
