= Bo Andersson (handballer) =

Swedish handball player (born 1951)

Personal information
- Full name: Bo Viktor Andersson
- Nationality: Sweden
- Born: 15 March 1951 (age 75) Eskilstuna, Sweden
- Height: 178 cm (70 in)

Sport
- Sport: Handball
- Position: Back

Senior clubs
- Years: Team
- 1967–1972: GUIF
- 1972–1973: IFK Malmö
- 1973–?: GUIF
National team
Years	Team	Apps	(Gls)
1972–1982	Sweden	119	(264)

Bo Viktor "Bobban" Andersson (born 15 March 1951) is a retired Swedish male handball player. He was a member of the Sweden men's national handball team. He was part of the team at the 1972 Summer Olympics, playing five matches. On club level he played for GUIF in Sweden. He was named Swedish Handballer of the Year twice; in 1973 and 1977.

He started playing handball in the Eskiltuna based club IF Verdandi, where he played until he was 16. Then he switched to GUIF.

Bo Andersson is the father of handballer Robin Andersson.
