= Francisco López (handballer) =

Spanish handball player (born 1949)

Francisco López Balcells (born 13 July 1949) is a former Spanish handball player who competed in the 1972 Summer Olympics and in the 1980 Summer Olympics.

In 1972, he was part of the Spanish team which finished fifteenth in the Olympic tournament. He played three matches and scored one goal.

Eight years later he finished fifth with the Spanish team in the 1980 Olympic tournament. He played all six matches and scored eleven goals.
