= Udo Röhrig =

German handball player (born 1943)

Udo Röhrig (born 2 June 1943) is an East German former handball player who competed in the 1972 Summer Olympics.

He was born in Groß-Ottersleben.

In 1972 he was part of the East German team which finished fourth in the Olympic tournament. He played five matches and scored seven goals.
