= Klaus Lange (handballer) =

German handball player (born 1939)

Klaus Lange (born September 14, 1939) is a former West German handball player who competed in the 1972 Summer Olympics.

In 1972 he was part of the West German team which finished sixth in the Olympic tournament. He played all six matches and scored nine goals.

Lange was a school teacher in Hamburg, where he played for the local club Hamburger SV. Towards the end of his career he played for VfL Lübeck-Schwartau. Later he became the mayor of the town of Herzhorn west of Hamburg, working as a principal at the local school.
