= Herbert Lübking =

German handball player (born 1941)

Personal information
- Nationality: German
- Born: 23 October 1941 (age 85) Minden-Dankersen, Germany
- Height: 184 cm (72 in)

Sport
- Sport: Handball
- Position: Centre back

Youth career
- Years: Team
- 1949–1960: TSV Grün-Weiß Dankersen

Senior clubs
- Years: Team
- 1960–1970: TSV Grün-Weiß Dankersen
- 1970–1978: TuS Nettelstedt
National team
Years	Team	Apps	(Gls)
1962–1973	Germany	118	(532)
1962–1973	Germany Outdoor	21	(118)

Teams managed
- 1976–1978: TuS Nettelstedt (as player-coach)
- 1978–1982: TBV Lemgo
- 1983: TuS Lahde/Quetzen
- 1984–1984: TuS 09 Möllbergen

Herbert Lübking (born October 23, 1941, in Minden-Dankersen) is a former West German handball player and coach who competed in the 1972 Summer Olympics.

In 1972 he was part of the West German team which finished sixth in the Olympic tournament. He played all six matches and scored nine goals.

At the 1967 World Men's Handball Championship he was the topscorer with 38 goals. Germany finished 6th at the tournament.

He held the Bundesliga record for most penalty goals in a single game (20) for more than 40 years from 1969 until Stefan Schröder beat in 2009 with 21.
