= Abdel Aziz Zaibi =

Tunisian handball player

Personal information
- Nationality: Tunisian
- Born: 15 April 1953
- Died: 18 July 2020 (aged 67)

Sport
- Sport: Handball

Abdel Aziz Zaibi (15 April 1953 – 18 July 2020) was a Tunisian handball player. He competed in the men's tournament at the 1972 Summer Olympics.
