= Keld Andersen =

Danish handball player (1946–2021)

Keld Jul Andersen (4 March 1946 – 6 November 2021) was a Danish handball player who competed in the 1972 Summer Olympics.

He played his club handball with IF Stjernen, and was the top goalscorer of the club in the 1972–73 Danish Handball League season. In 1972 he was part of the Denmark national team which finished thirteenth in the Olympic tournament. He played all five matches and scored seven goals. In total he played 52 national team games for Denmark. He was the father of Anja Andersen, one of the most celebrated personalities in the history of Danish handball.

He was born in Odense, Denmark. In addition to handball he worked as a locksmith. He died of cancer on 6 November 2021.
