= Joel Voelkert =

American handball player

Personal information
- Full name: Joel Raymond Voelkert
- Nationality: United States
- Born: November 25, 1948 (age 77)

Sport
- Sport: Handball

Joel Raymond Voelkert (born November 25, 1948) is an American former handball player who competed in the 1972 Summer Olympics. He was born in Elkhart, Indiana.

In 1972 he was part of the American team which finished 14th in the Olympic tournament. He played all five matches and scored seven goals.
