= Frank Ström =

Swedish handball player (born 1947)

Frank Göran Ström (born 13 June 1947 in Göteborg, Sweden) is a Swedish former handball player who competed in the 1972 Summer Olympics.

In 1972 he was part of the Swedish team which finished seventh in the Olympic tournament. He played five matches.

At club level he played for Västra Frölunda IF, SoIK Hellas and IFK Lindingö. In addition to handball, he also played soccer for Västra Frölunda IF.
