= Flemming Lauritzen =

Danish handball player (born 1949)

Flemming Lauritzen (born 28 June 1949) is a Danish former handball player who competed in the 1972 Summer Olympics. He played as a goalkeeper.

He played his club handball with Helsingør IF. He debuted for the Danish national team on October 2nd 1970 against West Germany. In 1972 he was part of the Danish team which finished thirteenth in the Olympic tournament. He played four matches.

In total he played 69 matches for the Danish national team over a 6 year period.
