= Jaroslav Konečný (handballer) =

Czechoslovak handball player

Olympic medal record

Men's Handball
Silver medal – second place	1972 Munich	Team competition

Jaroslav Konečný (14 January 1945 in Měnín – 1 August 2017 in Újezd u Brna) was a Czechoslovak handball player who competed in the 1972 Summer Olympics.

He was part of the Czechoslovak team which won the silver medal at the Munich Games. He played all six matches and scored 22 goals.
