= Diethard Finkelmann =

German handball player (born 1941)

Personal information
- Nationality: German
- Born: 15 July 1941 (age 85) Potsdam, Nazi Germany

Sport
- Sport: Handball
National team
Years	Team	Apps	(Gls)
–	Germany	68	(50)

Diethard Finkelmann (born 15 July 1941) is a former West German handball player who competed in the 1972 Summer Olympics.

In 1972 he was part of the West German team which finished sixth in the Olympic tournament. He played five matches and scored one goal.

He has been awarded the Silbernes Lorbeerblatt and is considered a legend at Füchse Berlin.
