= 1972 IHF Olympic American qualification tournament =

American qualification tournament
Tournament details
- Host country: United States
- Venue(s): 1 (in 1 host city)
- Dates: 2–6 February 1972
- Teams: 4 (from 1 confederation)

Tournament statistics
- Matches played: 6
- Goals scored: 216 (36 per match)

Awards
- Best goalkeeper: (Canada) Bruno Schendel

The 1972 IHF Olympic American qualification tournament was held in the United States. The winner of the tournament qualified for the 1972 Summer Olympics.

== Standings ==
Pos	Team	Pld	W	D	L	GF	GA	GD	Pts	Qualification
1	United States (H)	3	3	0	0	70	35	+35	6	1972 Summer Olympics
2	Canada	3	2	0	1	57	31	+26	4	
3	Argentina	3	1	0	2	53	64	−11	2	
4	Mexico	3	0	0	3	36	86	−50	0	

Source: Todor66
Rules for classification: 1) Points; 2) Head-to-head points; 3) Head-to-head goal difference; 4) Head-to-head goals scored; 5) Goal difference; 6) Goals scored; 7) Draw.
(H) Hosts

== Matches ==
All times are local (UTC−5).

2 February 1972	Canada	22–11	Argentina	Elkhart, Indiana
2 February 1972		(8–5)		Elkhart, Indiana

2 February 1972	United States	33–11	Mexico	Elkhart, Indiana
2 February 1972		(16–3)		Elkhart, Indiana

3 February 1972	Canada	24–5	Mexico	Elkhart, Indiana
3 February 1972	Kibblewhite & Lambert (7); Erik Jacobsen Jacobsen (3)	(12–3)		Elkhart, Indiana

3 February 1972	United States	22–13	Argentina	Elkhart, Indiana
3 February 1972		(7–6)		Elkhart, Indiana

6 February 1972	Mexico	20–29	Argentina	Elkhart, Indiana
6 February 1972		(9–11)		Elkhart, Indiana

6 February 1972	United States	15–11	Canada	Elkhart, Indiana
6 February 1972	Tinkle & Rogers (4)	(6–5)	Erik Jacobsen Jacobsen & Kibblewhite (3)	Elkhart, Indiana
