= Anatoly Shevchenko =

Russian handball player

Personal information
- Nationality: Russian
- Born: 21 January 1940
- Died: 27 December 2002 (aged 62)

Sport
- Sport: Handball

Anatoly Shevchenko (21 January 1940 – 27 December 2002) was a Russian handball player. He competed in the men's tournament at the 1972 Summer Olympics.
