= Elmer Edes =

American handball player

Personal information
- Born: September 4, 1937; United States
- Died: February 7, 2014 (aged 76)

Elmer Edes (September 4, 1937 – February 7, 2014) was an American handball player who competed in the 1972 Summer Olympics. He was born in Budapest, Hungary. In 1972 he was part of the American team which finished 14th in the Olympic tournament. He played all five matches. He played for the Adelphi University.
