= Roger Hverven =

Norwegian handball player (1944–2026)

Roger Hverven (15 March 1944 – 15 February 2026) was a Norwegian handball wing-player who competed in the 1972 Summer Olympics.

== Biography ==
Hverven was born in Oslo on 15 March 1944. He represented the club Oppsal IF. In 1972 he was part of the Norway national team which finished ninth in the Olympic tournament. He played four matches and scored seven goals. Hverven died on 15 February 2026, at the age of 81.
