= Ridha Zitoun =

Tunisian handball player

Personal information
- Nationality: Tunisian
- Born: 1 February 1952 (age 73)

Sport
- Sport: Handball

Ridha Zitoun (born 1 February 1952) is a Tunisian handball player. He competed in the men's tournament at the 1972 Summer Olympics.
