= Ivan Usaty =

Russian handball player

Personal information
- Nationality: Russian
- Born: 18 August 1940 (age 84)

Sport
- Sport: Handball

Ivan Usaty (born 18 August 1940) is a Russian handball player. He competed in the men's tournament at the 1972 Summer Olympics.
