= Albin Vidović =

Croatian handball player (1943–2018)

Personal information
- Born: 11 February 1943 Zagreb, Independent State of Croatia
- Died: 8 March 2018 (aged 75) Bjelovar, Croatia

Sport
- Sport: Handball

Senior clubs
- Years: Team
- 1960–1975: RK Partizan Bjelovar
National team
Years	Team	Apps	(Gls)
1963–1973	Yugoslavia	44	(48)
Medal record
Men's Handball
Olympic Games
Gold medal – first place	1972 Munich	Team
World Championship
Gold medal – first place	1964 Czechoslovakia	Team
Mediterranean Games
Gold medal – first place	1967 Tunis	Team

Albin Vidović (11 February 1943 – 8 March 2018) was a Croatian handball player who competed in the 1972 Summer Olympics.

He was part of the Yugoslav team which won the gold medal. He played one match.

== Honours ==
Partizan Bjelovar

- Yugoslav First League (6): 1960–61, 1966–67, 1967–68, 1969–70, 1970–71, 1971–72
- Yugoslav Cup (1): 1968
- European Champions Cup (1): 1971-72
