= Olle Olsson =

Swedish handball player (born 1948)

Personal information
- Full name: Nils Olle Bernhard Olsson
- Nationality: Swedish
- Born: 1 June 1948 Lund, Sweden
- Died: 29 June 2024 (aged 76)

Sport
- Sport: Handball
- Position: Back
- Current club: Retired

Youth career
- Years: Team
- 1960–1964: Lugi HF

Senior clubs
- Years: Team
- 1964–1970: Lugi HF
- 1970: IF Saab
- 1970–1975: Lugi HF
- 1975–1980: AIK
National team
Years	Team	Apps	(Gls)
1967–1977	Sweden	73	(127)

Teams managed
- 1975–1980: AIK (as player-coach)
- 1980–1982: IFK Kristianstad
- 1982–1990: Lugi HF
- 1990–1993: IL Norrøna (Norway)
- 1993–1995: Virum-Sorgenfri HK (Denmark)
- 1995–1997: Japan national team
- 1997–1998: VfL Gummersbach (Germany)
- 1999–2000: Lugi HF
- 2000–2002: Saudi Arabia national team

Olle Olsson (1 June 1948 – 29 June 2024) was a Swedish handball player and handball coach. In 1972 he was part of the Swedish team which finished seventh in the Olympic tournament. He played four matches and scored two goals.

== Club career ==
Olsson started playing handball at the age of 12 in Lugi HF in Lund. It was also here he started his career in 1964 when he was only 16 years old. Lugi was at that time the Swedish 2nd division, the second highest level in Sweden. The same year Lugi was promoted to the highest tier, Allsvenskan, and thus Olle Olsson made his top flight debut the next year.

In 1970 he was in military service, and therefore he played a single year at IF Saab, only to return to Lugi HF. He played a total of 136 matches, scoring 523 goals. In 1975 he stopped playing at Lugi to study at the Swedish School of Sport and Health Sciences in Stockholm. Therefore, he started playing for the Stockholm club AIK, where he was a playing manager. He played for AIK for 5 years, while he was studying. In 1980 he retired as player to coach full time.

== National team ==
Olsson played for the Swedish national team for 10 years between 1967 and 1977, where he represented Sweden at the 1972 Summer Olympics in Münich and the 1974 World Cup in East Germany.

== Coaching career ==
Olsson started coaching as a player-coach at AIK, where he was until 1980. AIK closed the handball department that year, which ended his tenure. He moved on to IFK Kristianstad where he was the coach from 1980 to 1982. In 1982 he returned to coach his childhood club Lugi HF, where he was the coach for 8 years.
