= Björn Andersson (handballer) =

Swedish handball player (born 1950)

Personal information
- Full name: Björn Erling Andersson
- Nationality: Sweden
- Born: 5 July 1950 (age 76) Sweden
- Height: 196 cm (77 in)

Sport
- Sport: Handball
- Position: Left back

Youth career
- Years: Team
- -1968: Örebro SK
- 1968-1989: IF Saab

Senior clubs
- Years: Team
- 1969-1978: IF Saab
National team
Years	Team	Apps	(Gls)
1969-1978	Sweden	114	(460)

Björn "Lurch" Andersson (born 5 July 1950) is a Swedish former handball player who played all his active years in IF Saab in Linköping. He won the Swedish championship in 1973 and |1974 with the club. He was topscorer in the Swedish league in 1970, 1971 and 1972. In 1975/76 he was named Swedish male handballer of the year.

With Sweden he competed in the 1972 Summer Olympics.

In 1972 he was part of the Swedish team which finished seventh in the Olympic tournament. He played five matches and scored eleven goals. He also participated in the World Championship 3 times; in 1970, 1974 and 1978.
