= Peter Randt =

German handball player (born 1941)

Personal information
- Nationality: East Germany; Germany
- Born: 24 January 1941 Güstrow, East Germany
- Height: 182 cm (72 in)

Sport
- Sport: Handball

Senior clubs
- Years: Team
- –: SC DHfK Leipzig
National team
Years	Team	Apps
–	East Germany	6
- Updated on only during the 1972 Summer Olympics

Peter Randt (born 24 January 1941) is a former East German male handball player. He was a member of the East Germany national handball team, playing 6 matches. He was part of the team at the 1972 Summer Olympics. On club level he played for SC DHfK Leipzig.

Randt also played for the silver medal-winning national team in the 1970 World Men's Handball Championship in France, which lost in the final to Romania, 13–12. He was in the 1967 World Men's Handball Championship team in Sweden, which was eliminated after the first round.
