= Miguel Ángel Cascallana =

Spanish handball player (1948-2015)

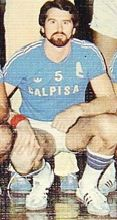
Miguel Ángel Cascallana

Miguel Ángel Cascallana Guerra (February 26, 1948 – January 26, 2015) was a Spanish handball player who competed in the 1972 Summer Olympics.

In 1972 he was part of the Spanish team which finished fifteenth in the Olympic tournament. He played all five matches and scored three goals.
