= Valentin Kulev =

Soviet handball player

Valentin Kulev (Russian: Валентин Кулев, born July 10, 1948) is a Russian former handball player who competed for the Soviet Union in the 1972 Summer Olympics.

In 1972 he was part of the Soviet team which finished fifth. He played all six matches and scored 13 goals.
