= Michael Koch (handballer) =

Swedish handball player (born 1942)

Hans Gösta Michael Koch (born 26 January 1942 in Uddevalla, Sweden) is a Swedish former handball player who competed in the 1972 Summer Olympics.

In 1972 he was part of the Swedish team which finished seventh in the Olympic tournament. He played five matches and scored four goals.

At club level he played for Uddevalla HK, Redbergslids IK and UoIF Matteuspojkarna.
