= Juan Morera =

Spanish handball player (1947–2006)

Juan Morera Altisent (Note: In this Spanish name, the first or paternal surname is Morera and the second or maternal family name is Altisent.) (7 January 1947 – 1 October 2006) was a Spanish handball player. He competed in the 1972 Summer Olympics.

In 1972 he was part of the Spanish team which finished fifteenth in the Olympic tournament. He played all five matches and scored 22 goals.
