= Jerzy Melcer =

Polish handball player (born 1949)

Olympic medal record

Men's Handball
| Bronze medal – third place | 1976 Montreal | Team |

Jerzy Melcer (born 10 March 1949 in Białystok) is a former Polish handball player who competed in the 1972 Summer Olympics and in the 1976 Summer Olympics.

== Career ==
In 1972 he was part of the Polish team which finished tenth. He played all five matches and scored nineteen goals.

Four years later he won the bronze medal with the Polish team. He played four matches and scored nine goals.
