= Minoru Kino =

Japanese handball player (born 1945)

Minoru Kino (木野 実, Kino Minoru; born 5 December 1945) is a Japanese former handball player who competed in the 1972 Summer Olympics and in the 1976 Summer Olympics.
