= Lars Karlsson (handballer) =

Swedish handball player (born 1948)

Lars Karlsson (born 7 January 1948) is a Swedish former handball player who competed in the 1972 Summer Olympics.

In 1972 he was part of the Swedish team which finished seventh in the Olympic tournament. He played four matches.
