= James Rogers (handballer) =

American handball player

Personal information
- Full name: James Galvin Rogers
- Nationality: United States
- Born: October 16, 1946 (age 80)

Sport
- Sport: Handball

James Galvin Rogers (born October 16, 1946) is an American former handball player who competed in the 1972 Summer Olympics and in the 1976 Summer Olympics.

He was born in Glendale, California.

In 1972 he was part of the American team which finished 14th in the Olympic tournament. He played four matches and scored 15 goals.

Four years later he finished tenth with the American team in the 1976 Olympic tournament. He played all five matches and scored 18 goals.
