= Katsuhiko Chikamori =

Japanese handball player (born 1945)

Katsuhiko Chikamori (born 24 September 1945) is a Japanese former handball player who competed in the 1972 Summer Olympics.
