= 1971 IHF Olympic Asian qualification tournament =

Asian qualification tournament
- Logo of the tournament

Tournament details
- Host country: Japan
- Venues: 4 (in 3 host cities)
- Dates: 13–29 November 1971
- Teams: 3 (from 1 confederation)

Tournament statistics
- Matches played: 6
- Goals scored: 163 (27.17 per match)

The 1971 IHF Olympic Asian qualification tournament was held in Japan. The winner of the tournament qualified for the 1972 Summer Olympics.

== Standings ==
Pos	Team	Pld	W	D	L	GF	GA	GD	Pts	Qualification
1	Japan (H)	4	4	0	0	74	24	+50	8	1972 Summer Olympics
2	Israel	4	1	0	3	46	63	−17	2 (Note: Israel against South Korea +5 goals total 35–30)	
3	South Korea	4	1	0	3	43	76	−33	2	
4	Taiwan (W)	0	0	0	0	0	0	0	0	

Source: Todor66
Rules for classification: 1) Points; 2) Head-to-head points; 3) Head-to-head goal difference; 4) Head-to-head goals scored; 5) Goal difference; 6) Goals scored; 7) Draw.
(H) Hosts; (W) Withdraw

== Matches ==
All times are local (UTC+9).

14 November 1971; 15:40	Japan	15–4	Israel	Tokyo Metropolitan Gymnasium, Tokyo; Referees: Carlsson & Olsson (SWE)
14 November 1971; 15:40		(8–1)	Amikam Riklin (2); Zvi Tel-Or & Moshe Vagelowitz (1)	Tokyo Metropolitan Gymnasium, Tokyo; Referees: Carlsson & Olsson (SWE)

17 November 1971; 18:00	South Korea	15-13	Israel	Tokyo Metropolitan Gymnasium, Tokyo; Attendance: 2000; Referees: Carlsson & Olsson (SWE)
17 November 1971; 18:00	Che Song Buk (7)	(6-4)	Benjamin Naaman, Igor Bialik & Eitan Madmoni (3); Wenglowitz (2); Yirimi & Utlior (1).	Tokyo Metropolitan Gymnasium, Tokyo; Attendance: 2000; Referees: Carlsson & Olsson (SWE)

20 November 1971; 18:00	Japan	20-6	South Korea	Osaka City Central Gymnasium, Osaka; Referees: Carlsson & Olsson (SWE)
20 November 1971; 18:00		(10-5)		Osaka City Central Gymnasium, Osaka; Referees: Carlsson & Olsson (SWE)

- According to the IHF: 20-9

23 November 1971; 14:30	Israel	7-18	Japan	Aichi Prefectural Gymnasium, Nagoya; Attendance: 4000; Referees: Carlsson & Olsson (SWE)
23 November 1971; 14:30	Akiva Lefler (3)	(5-6)	Novoyuki Ida (6)	Aichi Prefectural Gymnasium, Nagoya; Attendance: 4000; Referees: Carlsson & Olsson (SWE)

26 November 1971; 18:00	Israel	22-15	South Korea	Komazawa Gymnasium, Tokyo; Referees: Carlsson & Olsson (SWE)
26 November 1971; 18:00	Akiva Lefer (12); Igor Bialik (3)	(8-6)	Tsang Sung Bok (Most)	Komazawa Gymnasium, Tokyo; Referees: Carlsson & Olsson (SWE)

28 November 1971; 15:40	Japan	21-7	South Korea	Komazawa Gymnasium, Tokyo; Referees: Carlsson & Olsson (SWE)
28 November 1971; 15:40		(8-4)		Komazawa Gymnasium, Tokyo; Referees: Carlsson & Olsson (SWE)

== Broadcast ==
The first and last game of Japan were broadcast by NHK Educational TV. For the game on 23 November Israel against Japan there were negotiation for a radio broadcast at NHK Radio 1.
