= Simon Schobel =

Romanian handball player (born 1950)

Medal record

Men's Handball

Representing Romania

Olympic Games
Bronze medal – third place	1972 Munich	Team

Simon Schobel (born February 22, 1950) is a former Romanian handball player who competed in the 1972 Summer Olympics.

He was born in Sebeș, Alba County. In 1972 he won the bronze medal with the Romanian team. He played all six matches and scored two goals.

In 1973 he defected to West Germany after a game that his team Universitatea Cluj had played there.

In 2004 he was arrested on suspicion of tax evasion, and released in January 2005.

In 1982 he was appointed manager of the German men's national handball team, at 32 the youngest ever.

As of 2012, he was again living in Romania.
