= Kenichi Sasaki =

Japanese handball player (born 1950)

Kenichi Sasaki (佐々木 健一, Sasaki Ken'ichi; born 21 January 1950) is a Japanese former handball player who competed in the 1972 Summer Olympics and in the 1976 Summer Olympics.
