= Milan Lazarević (handballer) =

Serbian handball player (born 1948)

Olympic medal record

Men's Handball
| Gold medal – first place | 1972 Munich | Team competition |

Milan Lazarević (Serbian Cyrillic: Милан Лазаревић, born July 11, 1948, in Belgrade) is a Yugoslav handball player who competed in the 1972 Summer Olympics.

He was part of the Yugoslav team which won the gold medal at the Munich Games. He played all six matches and scored 27 goals.
