= 1972 IHF Olympic African qualification tournament =

African qualification tournament
Tournament details
- Host country: Tunisia
- Venue(s): 1 (in 1 host city)
- Dates: 25–31 March 1972
- Teams: 6 (from 1 confederation)

Final positions
- Champions: Tunisia
- Runner-up: Egypt
- Third place: Senegal
- Fourth place: Algeria

Tournament statistics
- Matches played: 15

The 1972 IHF Olympic African qualification tournament was held in the Tunisia. The winner of the tournament qualified for the 1972 Summer Olympics.

== Officials ==
Nation	Referee 1	Referee 1
West Germany	Edgar Reichel	Wilfried Tetens
Finland	Unto Repo	Heikki Tuominen
Switzerland	Hansjakob Bertschinger	Kurt Gabriel

Nation	Name	Roll
Spain	Alberto de San Roman	Vice president of the IHF
France	René Ricard	Member of the technical commission of the IHF

== Standings ==
Pos	Team	Pld	W	D	L	GF	GA	GD	Pts	Qualification
1	Tunisia (H)	5	4	0	1	97	86	+11	8	1972 Summer Olympics
2	Egypt	5	3	1	1	105	81	+24	7	
3	Senegal	5	3	0	2	97	100	−3	6	
4	Algeria	5	2	1	2	90	94	−4	5	
5	Cameroon	5	2	0	3	91	99	−8	4	
6	Morocco	5	0	0	5	83	103	−20	0	

Source: Der Bund
Rules for classification: 1) Points; 2) Head-to-head points; 3) Head-to-head goal difference; 4) Head-to-head goals scored; 5) Goal difference; 6) Goals scored; 7) Draw.
(H) Hosts

== Matches ==
All times are local (UTC+1).

Some results were published in a Swiss newspapers. The winner of the other games were derived from the two standings table. And the results of the Algerian team.

25 March 1972	Algeria	20-19	Morocco	Stade El Menzah, Tunis

25 March 1972	Tunisia	25–22	Senegal	Stade El Menzah, Tunis

25 March 1972	Egypt	27–14	Cameroon	Stade El Menzah, Tunis

26 March 1972	Algeria	17-16	Tunisia	Stade El Menzah, Tunis

26 March 1972	Senegal	21–19	Cameroon	Stade El Menzah, Tunis

26 March 1972	Egypt	22–13	Morocco	Stade El Menzah, Tunis

28 March 1972	Tunisia	18–13	Egypt	Stade El Menzah, Tunis

28 March 1972	Senegal	21-17	Algeria	Stade El Menzah, Tunis

28 March 1972	Cameroon	24–17	Morocco	Stade El Menzah, Tunis

29 March 1972	Egypt	19–19	Algeria	Stade El Menzah, Tunis

29 March 1972	Tunisia	17–15	Cameroon	Stade El Menzah, Tunis

29 March 1972	Senegal	16–15	Morocco	Stade El Menzah, Tunis

31 March 1972	Tunisia	21–19	Morocco	Stade El Menzah, Tunis

31 March 1972	Cameroon	19–17	Algeria	Stade El Menzah, Tunis

31 March 1972	Egypt	24–17	Senegal	Stade El Menzah, Tunis

== Roaster of Algeria ==
Hachemi, Zoheir Negli, Amara, Farouk Bouzrar, Boukhobza, Lamdjadani, Bouras, Larbaoui

Coaches: Mircea Costache II et Djoudi
