= Yury Klimov =

Soviet handball player (1940–2022)

Medal record

Representing Soviet Union

Men's Handball

Olympic Games
Gold medal – first place	1976 Montreal	Team

World Championship
Silver medal – second place	1978 Denmark	Team competition

Yury Mikhailovich Klimov (Russian: Юрий Михайлович Климов; 22 July 1940 – 17 October 2022) was a Soviet and Russian handball player who competed in the 1972 Summer Olympics and in the 1976 Summer Olympics.

Klimov was born in Ukhta on 22 July 1940. He trained in Moscow and became the Honoured Master of Sports of the USSR in 1973. Klimov played 173 matches for the USSR National Team. At the 1972 Summer Olympics he was part of the Soviet team which finished fifth. He played all six matches and scored seven goals. Four years later he won the gold medal with the Soviet team. He played all six matches and scored twelve goals. He coached from 1979, and latterly served as the coach of the Iran men's national handball team. Klimov was awarded the Order of the Red Banner of Labour in 1976.

Klimov died on 17 October 2022, at the age of 82.

== Coaching career ==
- Iran men's national handball team (2006–08)
- Zob Ahan Esfahan (2009–20??)
