= Kiyoshi Noda =

Japanese handball player (born 1946)

Kiyoshi Noda (野田 清, Noda Kyoshi; born 5 April 1946) is a former Japanese handball player who competed in the 1972 Summer Olympics.
