= Milorad Karalić =

Serbian handball player (born 1946)

Personal information
- Nationality: Serbian
- Born: 7 January 1946 (age 80) Potkozarje, Banja Luka, Yugoslavia
- Height: 184 cm (72 in)

Sport
- Sport: Handball

Senior clubs
- Years: Team
- –: Borac Banja Luka
National team
Years	Team	Apps	(Gls)
–	Yugoslavia	128	(181)
Medal record
Men's Handball
Gold medal – first place	1972 Munich	Team competition

Milorad Karalić (Serbian Cyrillic: Милорад Каралић, born 7 January 1946) is a Serbian former handball player who competed for Yugoslavia in the 1972 Summer Olympics and in the 1976 Summer Olympics.

He was born in Potkozarje, Bosnia and Herzegovina, then Yugoslavia.

In 1972, he was part of the Yugoslav team which won the gold medal at the Munich Games. He played all six matches and scored two goals.

Four years later he was a member of the Yugoslav team which finished fifth in the Olympic tournament. He played all six matches and scored eleven goals.

At club level he played for RK Borac Banja Luka, with whom he won the 1975-76 European Cup.
