= Rainer Würdig =

German handball player (born 1947)

Rainer Würdig (born 18 April 1947) is an East German former handball player who competed in the 1972 Summer Olympics.

He was born in Holzdorf (Jessen).

In 1972 he was part of the East German team which finished fourth in the Olympic tournament. He played two matches and scored two goals.
