= Vasily Ilyin =

Soviet handball player (1949–2015)

Medal record

Representing Soviet Union

Men's Handball

Olympic Games
Gold medal – first place	1976 Montreal	Team

World Championship
Silver medal – second place	1978 Denmark	Team

Vasily Petrovich Ilyin (Russian: Василий Петрович Ильин; 8 January 1949 – 21 September 2015) was a Soviet handball player.

Ilyin was born in Lisy Nos settlement, Pargolovsky District, Leningrad Oblast He trained at Burevestnik in Moscow. He was a member of the USSR National Team since 1970 and became the Honoured Master of Sports of the USSR in 1976. In 1972 he was part of the USSR Olympic Team which finished fifth at the 1972 Summer Olympics. He played all six matches and scored eleven goals. Four years later he won the gold medal with the Soviet team at the 1976 Summer Olympics. He played three matches and scored two goals. During his career he played 101 match for the USSR National Team and scored 177 goals.
