= José Rochel =

Spanish handball player (1943-2001)

José Rochel Morales also known as Pitiu Rochel (July 30, 1943 – 9 February 2001) was a Spanish handball player. He competed in the 1972 Summer Olympics.

In 1972 he was part of the Spanish team which finished fifteenth in the Olympic tournament. He played two matches and scored nine goals.
