= Stefán Jónsson (handballer) =

Icelandic handball player (born 1944)

Personal information
- Nationality: Icelandic
- Born: 25 April 1944 (age 82)
- Height: 178 cm (70 in)

Sport
- Sport: Handball
- Current club: Retired
National team
Years	Team	Apps	(Gls)
–	Iceland	30	(37)

Stefán Jónsson (born 24 April 1944) is an Icelandic former handball player who competed in the 1972 Summer Olympics.
