= Aleksandr Panov (handballer) =

Soviet handball player

Aleksandr Panov (Russian: Александр Панов; born 13 January 1946) is a former Russian handball player who competed for the Soviet Union in the 1972 Summer Olympics.

In 1972 he was part of the Soviet team which finished fifth in the Olympic tournament. He played all six matches and scored 15 goals.
