= Takezo Nakai =

Japanese handball player (born 1949)

Takezo Nakai (中井 武三, Nakai Takezō; born 11 March 1949) is a Japanese former handball player who competed in the 1972 Summer Olympics and in the 1976 Summer Olympics.
