= Zdzisław Antczak =

Polish handball player (1947–2019)

Personal information
- Nationality: Polish
- Born: 20 November 1947 Miłkowice, Poland
- Died: 28 February 2019 (aged 71) Poland
- Height: 1.88 m (6 ft 2 in)

Sport
- Sport: Handball
- Position: Right wing

Senior clubs
- Years: Team
- 1960–1967: Ostrovia Ostrów Wielkopolski
- 1967–1977: Śląsk Wrocław
- 1977–1982: KV Mechelen
National team
Years	Team	Apps	(Gls)
1969–1976	Poland	81	(156)
Medal record
Olympic Games
Men's Handball
Bronze medal – third place	1976 Montreal	Team

Zdzisław Antczak (20 November 1947 – 28 February 2019) was a Polish handball player who competed in the 1972 Summer Olympics and in the 1976 Summer Olympics. Honoured Master of Sport of Poland.

In 1972 he was part of the Polish team which finished tenth. Four years later he won the bronze medal with the Polish team.
