= Zbigniew Dybol =

Polish handball player (born 1947)

Personal information
- Nationality: Polish
- Born: 22 February 1947 (age 79) Poznań, Poland
- Height: 1.72 m (5 ft 8 in)

Sport
- Sport: Handball
- Position: Left wing

Senior clubs
- Years: Team
- 1966–1977: Grunwald Poznań
- 1977–1978: UHK Krems
- 1978–1983: Polizei-Sportverein Hannover
National team
Years	Team	Apps	(Gls)
1968–1976	Poland	141	(246)

Zbigniew Dybol (born 22 February 1947) is a former Polish handball player who competed in the 1972 Summer Olympics and finished tenth with the Polish team.
