= Hiroshi Honda (handballer) =

Japanese handball player (born 1947)

Hiroshi Honda (本田 洋, Honda Hiroshi, born 26 March 1947) is a Japanese former handball player who competed in the 1972 Summer Olympics and in the 1976 Summer Olympics.
