= Lennart Eriksson (handballer) =

Swedish handball player (born 1944)

Personal information
- Full name: Curt Axel Lennart Eriksson
- Nationality: Sweden
- Born: 2 February 1944 (age 82) Nyköping, Sweden

Sport
- Sport: Handball

Senior clubs
- Years: Team
- -1968: IFK Nyköping
- 1968-1974: SoiK Hellas
- 1974-1976: Ludvika IF
- 1976-?: SoiK Hellas
National team
Years	Team	Apps
1965-1974	Sweden	111

Lennart Eriksson (born 2 February 1944) is a Swedish former handball player who competed in the 1972 Summer Olympics. He was named Swedish Handballer of the year in both 1968 and 1969, and the first recipient of the award.

== Career ==
Eriksson started his career in IFK Nyköping, before moving to SK Hellas where he played in two stints from 1968 to 1974 and again from 1976 onwards. He won a total of 5 titles for the club in 1969, 1970, 1971, 1972 and 1977 In between 1974 and 1976 he played for Ludvika HF.

In 1972 he was part of the Swedish team which finished seventh in the Olympic tournament. He played all six matches and scored 25 goals.
