= Stefán Gunnarsson =

Icelandic handball player (born 1951)

Personal information
- Nationality: Icelandic
- Born: 23 April 1951 (age 75) Iceland

Sport
- Sport: Handball
National team
Years	Team	Apps	(Gls)
–	Iceland	56	(30)

Stefán Gunnarsson (born 23 April 1951) is an Icelandic former handball player who competed in the 1972 Summer Olympics.
