= Amor Sghaier =

Tunisian handball player

Personal information
- Nationality: Tunisian
- Born: 8 November 1950 (age 74)

Sport
- Sport: Handball

Amor Sghaier (born 8 November 1950) is a Tunisian handball player. He competed in the men's tournament at the 1972 Summer Olympics.
