= Richard Schlesinger (handballer) =

American handball player

Personal information
- Full name: Richard Bradley Schlesinger, Jr.
- Nationality: United States
- Born: September 2, 1946 (age 80)

Sport
- Sport: Handball

Richard Bradley Schlesinger, Jr. (born September 2, 1946) is an American former handball player who competed in the 1972 Summer Olympics.

He was born in Chicago.

In 1972 he was part of the American team which finished 14th in the Olympic tournament. He played all five matches and scored four goals.
