= Masayuki Hyokai =

Japanese handball player (born 1950)

Masayuki Hyokai (氷海 正行, Hyōkai Masayuki; born 21 March 1950) is a Japanese former handball player who competed in the 1972 Summer Olympics.
