= Jón Magnússon (handballer) =

Icelandic handball player (born 1948)

Personal information
- Nationality: Icelandic
- Born: 2 April 1948 (age 78) Iceland
- Height: 187 cm (74 in)

Sport
- Sport: Handball
National team
Years	Team	Apps	(Gls)
–	Iceland	46	(131)

Jón Magnússon (born 2 April 1948) is an Icelandic former handball player who competed in the 1972 Summer Olympics.
