= Jesús Guerrero =

Spanish handball player (born 1949)

Jesús Guerrero Béiztegui (born April 20, 1949) is a former Spanish handball player who competed in the 1972 Summer Olympics.

In 1972 he was part of the Spanish team which finished fifteenth in the Olympic tournament. He played all five matches.
