= Antonio Andreu =

Spanish handball player (born 1947)

Antonio Andreu Asensi (January 1, 1947 – 2003) was a Spanish handball player who competed in the 1972 Summer Olympics. In 1972 he was part of the Spanish team which finished fifteenth in the Olympic tournament. He played all five matches and scored two goals.
