= Klaus Langhoff =

German handball player (born 1939)

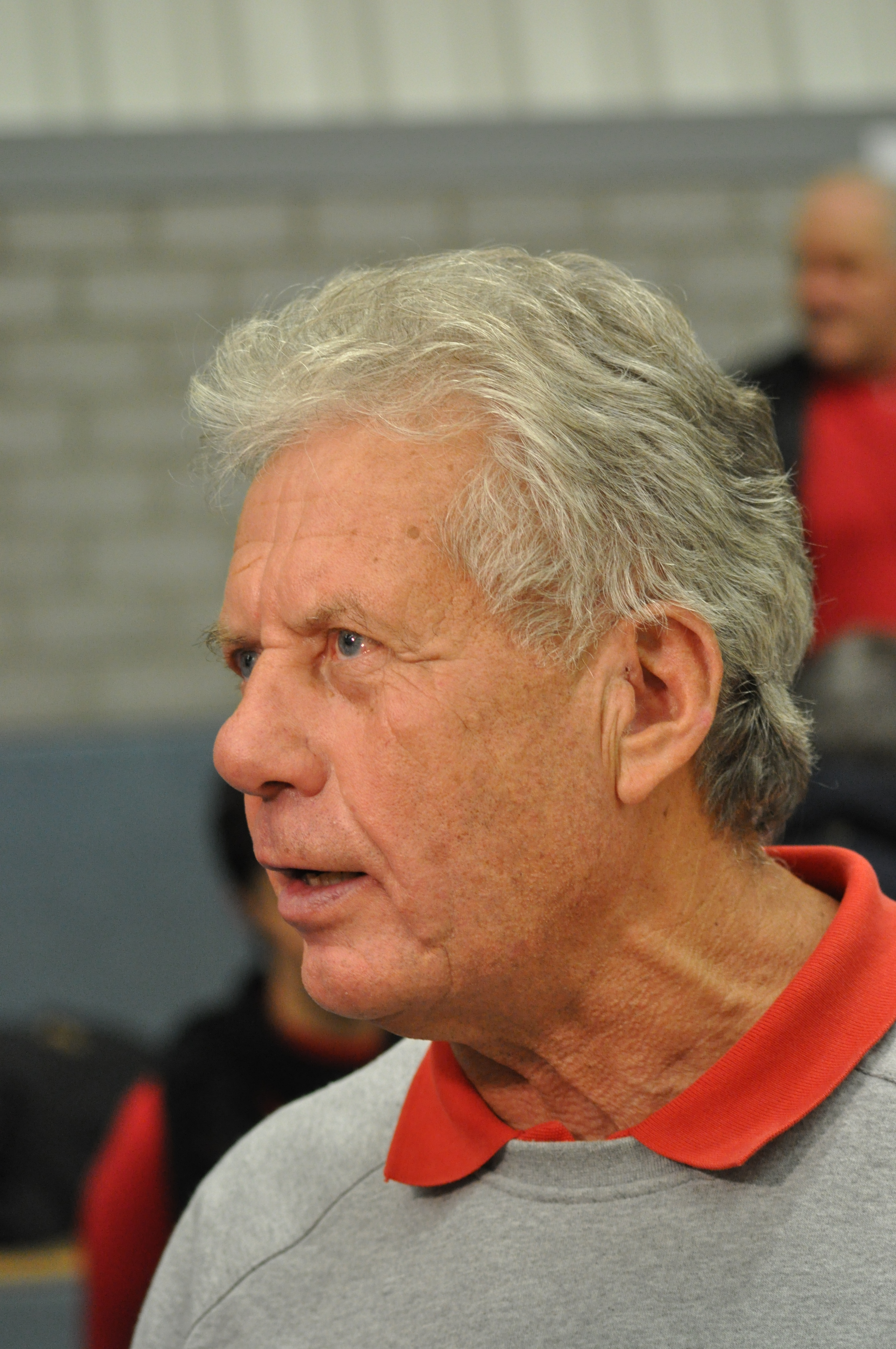
Klaus Langhoff in 2010

Klaus Langhoff (born December 5, 1939) is an East German former handball player who competed in the 1972 Summer Olympics.

He was born in Rostock.

In 1972 he was part of the East German team which finished fourth in the Olympic tournament. He played all six matches and scored six goals.
