= Bent Jørgensen (handballer) =

Danish handball player (born 1945)

Personal information
- Nationality: Danish
- Born: 8 November 1945 (age 81) Frederiksberg, Denmark
- Height: 180 cm (71 in)

Sport
- Sport: Handball

Senior clubs
- Years: Team
- –: IF Stadion
National team
Years	Team	Apps	(Gls)
1966-1973	Denmark	101	(107)

Bent Jørgensen (born 8 January 1945) is a Danish former handball player who competed in the 1972 Summer Olympics.

He played his club handball with Stadion IF. In 1972 he was part of the Denmark men's national handball team which finished thirteenth in the Olympic tournament. He played four matches and scored three goals.
