= Nobuyuki Iida =

Japanese handball player (born 1945)

Nobuyuki Iida (born 20 July 1945) is a Japanese former handball player who competed in the 1972 Summer Olympics.
