= Andrzej Lech =

Polish handball player (born 1946)

Andrzej Jan Lech (born 15 May 1946 in Gdynia) is a former Polish handball player who competed in the 1972 Summer Olympics.

In 1972 he was part of the Polish team which finished tenth. He played four matches and scored two goals.
