= José Villamarín =

Spanish handball player (born 1950)

José Faustino Villamarín Menéndez (born February 19, 1950, in Asturias) is a former Spanish handball player who competed in the 1972 Summer Olympics. In 1972 he was part of the Spanish team which finished fifteenth in the Olympic tournament. He played all five matches and scored seven goals.
