= Mohamed Naceur Jelili =

Tunisian handball player

Personal information
- Nationality: Tunisian
- Born: 2 February 1950 (age 75)

Sport
- Sport: Handball

Mohamed Naceur Jelili (born 2 February 1950) is a Tunisian handball player. He competed at the 1972 Summer Olympics and the 1976 Summer Olympics.
