= Toshio Niimi =

Japanese handball player (born 1949)

Toshio Niimi (born 14 June 1949) is a Japanese former handball player who competed in the 1972 Summer Olympics.
