= Björgvin Björgvinsson (handballer) =

Icelandic handball player (born 1949)

Personal information
- Nationality: Icelandic
- Born: 11 February 1949 (age 77)
- Height: 1.79 m (5 ft 10 in)

Sport
- Sport: Handball
National team
Years	Team	Apps	(Gls)
–	Iceland	106	(194)

Björgvin Björgvinsson (born 11 February 1949) is an Icelandic former handball player who competed in the 1972 Summer Olympics.
