= Toshihiko Shimosato =

Japanese handball player (born 1946)

Toshihiko Shimosato (born 2 June 1946) is a Japanese former handball player who competed in the 1972 Summer Olympics.
