= Shuji Arinaga =

Japanese handball player (born 1948)

Shuji Arinaga (有永 修二, Arinaga Shūji) (born 3 August 1948) is a Japanese former handball player who competed in the 1972 Summer Olympics.
