= Efterslægten =

Coordinates: 55°42′34″N 12°30′47″E

HF-Centret Efterslægten (Danish, "future generations") was founded as Efterslægtselskabets Skole by the philanthropic society Selskabet for Efterslægten on 4 March 1786 as a lower middle school and started teaching on 3 January 1787. In 1881 it also became a Latin school (grammar school) and in 1886 the first students with the Danish Studenter-eksamen graduated. In 1919 the institution was taken over by the Copenhagen Municipality, and 1958 the school began admission of girls. In 1991, the school changed name into "HF-Centret Efterslægten", and in 1993 the last students were graduated with Studenter-eksamen, as now the Higher Preparatory Examination (HF) is offered instead, both as a two-year programme and as individual courses for young people and adults. School motto: Non nobis (Latin: Not for our own sakes).

Adam Oehlenschläger described his time at the school with great satisfaction.

From 1790, Efterslægten was housed in a beautiful renaissance building, demolished in 1913 to make room for the department store Illum. The demolition contributed to endeavours to legislate about conservation of cultural heritage buildings in Denmark, successful in 1918. Since 1940, the school has been housed in its buildings by architect Henning Hansen in the Nordvest quarter of Copenhagen, near Utterslev Mose and Brønshøj.

Throughout parts of the 20th century, leading handball and basketball teams in Denmark were named Efterslægten, as they had their origin in the school. The handball team won the Danish Championship in 1970-71.

== Notable students ==
- Adam Oehlenschläger (b. 1779)
- Jørgen Jørgensen (b. 1780)
- Ole Sarvig (b.1921)

== Sources ==
- Jørgen Brager, 200 år : Efterslægtselskabets Skole 1786-1986, Efterslægtselskabets Skole, 1986.
- Jørgen Hatting, Efterslægtselskabet og dets Skole gennem halvandet hundrede Aar, 2 volumes, Reitzel, 1936.
- Ole Vadmand (ed.), "Et alternativ siden 1786: Samfund og skole gennem 225 år", HF-Centret Efterslægten, 2011.
