= Rokci =

Rokci may refer to:

- Rokci (Aleksandrovac), a village in Serbia
- Rokci (Ivanjica), a village in Serbia
