= Momir Rnić =

Momir Rnić may refer to:

- Momir Rnić (handballer, born 1955), Yugoslav handball player
- Momir Rnić (handballer, born 1987), Serbian handball player
