= Lapčević =

Lapčević (Serbian Cyrillic: Лапчевић) is a Serbian surname, possibly a demonym of Lapčevo. It may refer to:

- Dragiša Lapčević (1867–1939), Serbian politician, journalist, and historian
- Ivan Lapčević (born 1976), Serbian handballer
