= Donja Zleginja =

- Village
- Location within Serbia
- Coordinates: 43°26′42″N 21°09′40″E
- Country: Serbia
- District: Šumadija
- Municipality: Aleksandrovac

Population (2002)
  - Total: 296
- Time zone: UTC+1 (CET)
  - Summer (DST): UTC+2 (CEST)

Donja Zleginja (Serbian Cyrillic: Доња Злегиња) is a village in the municipality of Aleksandrovac, Serbia. According to the 2002 census, the village has a population of 296 people.

== See also ==
- List of places in Serbia
