= Donje Rataje =

- Village
- Location within Serbia
- Coordinates: 43°28′37″N 21°07′54″E
- Country: Serbia
- District: Šumadija
- Municipality: Aleksandrovac

Population (2002)
  - Total: 930
- Time zone: UTC+1 (CET)
  - Summer (DST): UTC+2 (CEST)

Donje Rataje (Serbian Cyrillic: Доње Ратаје) is a village in the municipality of Aleksandrovac, Serbia. According to the 2002 census, the village has a population of 930 people.

== Geography ==
Donje Rataje has a hilly terrain with an elevation range of 250-422 meters above sea level. This suggests that the surroundings has a picturesque landscape.

== See also ==
- List of places in Serbia
