= Laćisled =

- Village
- Location within Serbia
- Coordinates: 43°29′48″N 21°09′36″E
- Country: Serbia
- District: Rasina District
- Municipality: Aleksandrovac

Population (2002)
  - Total: 821
- Time zone: UTC+1 (CET)
  - Summer (DST): UTC+2 (CEST)

Laćisled (Serbian Cyrillic: Лаћислед) is a village in the municipality of Aleksandrovac, Serbia. According to the 2002 census, the village has a population of 821 people.

== See also ==
- List of places in Serbia
