= Dobroljubci =

Coordinates: 43°24′30″N 21°05′19″E

- Village
- Interactive map of Dobroljubci
- Country: Serbia
- District: Rasina
- Municipality: Aleksandrovac

Population (2002)
  - Total: 374
- Time zone: UTC+1 (CET)
  - Summer (DST): UTC+2 (CEST)

Dobroljubci (Serbian Cyrillic: Доброљубци) is a village in the municipality of Aleksandrovac, Serbia. According to the 2002 census, the village has a population of 374 people.

== See also ==
- List of places in Serbia
