= Venčac, Aleksandrovac =

Venčac Венчац
- Village
- Location within Serbia
- Coordinates: 43°26′45″N 21°06′23″E
- Country: Serbia
- Region: Šumadija and Western Serbia
- District: Rasina
- Municipality: Aleksandrovac
- Elevation: 860 ft (262 m)

Population (2011)
  - Total: 382
- Time zone: UTC+1 (CET)
  - Summer (DST): UTC+2 (CEST)

Venčac (Serbian Cyrillic: Венчац) is a village in the municipality of Aleksandrovac, Serbia. According to the 2011 census, the village has a population of 382 inhabitants.

== See also ==
- List of populated places in Serbia

== Population ==
Population of Venčac
| 1948 | 1953 | 1961 | 1971 | 1981 | 1991 | 2002 | 2011 |
| 403 | 448 | 390 | 396 | 401 | 478 | 400 | 382 |
