= Tržac =

Tržac may refer to:

- Tržac (Aleksandrovac), a village in Serbia
- Tržac (Cazin), a village in Bosnia and Herzegovina
