= Dragan Mladenović =

Dragan Mladenović may refer to:

- Dragan Mladenović (footballer) (born 1976), Serbian footballer
- Dragan Mladenović (handballer, born 1956), Yugoslav handball player
- Dragan Mladenović (handballer, born 1963), Serbian-French handball player and a member of a professional sports family
