= Velja Glava =

Velja Glava Веља Глава
- Village
- Interactive map of Velja Glava
- Coordinates: 43°29′51″N 21°01′42″E
- Country: Serbia
- District: Šumadija
- Municipality: Aleksandrovac

Population (2022)
  - Total: 127
- Time zone: UTC+1 (CET)
  - Summer (DST): UTC+2 (CEST)

Velja Glava (Serbian Cyrillic: Веља Глава) is a village in the municipality of Aleksandrovac, Serbia. According to the 2022 census, the village has a population of 127 people.

== See also ==
- List of populated places in Serbia
