= Gajić (surname) =

Gajić or Gajic (Serbian: Гајић) is a gender-neutral Slavic surname that may refer to

- Aleksa Gajić (born 1974), Serbian comics artist and film director
- Daniela Nuțu-Gajić (born 1957), Romanian-Australian chess player
- Dragan Gajić (born 1984), Slovenian handball player
- Goran Gajić (born 1962), Serbian film, television, and theater director
- Ivan Gajić (born 1979), Serbian handball player
- Marko Gajić (born 1992), Serbian football defender
- Milan Gajić (footballer, born 1986), Serbian football player
- Milan Gajić (footballer born 1996), Serbian football player
- Nenad Gajic (born 1983), Canadian lacrosse player
- Zoran Gajić (born 1958), Serbian volleyball coach
