= Fajfrić =

Fajfrić (Serbian Cyrillic: Фајфрић) is a Serbian surname. It is found in villages located in Šid.

Notable people with the name include:

- Petar Fajfrić (1942–2021), Serbian handball player
- Željko Fajfrić (born 1957), Serbian academic, lawyer and author
