= RK Crvenka =

Serbian handball club

- Full name: Rukometni klub Crvenka
- Nickname(s): Veverice (The Squirrels)
- Founded: 1952
- Arena: SC Crvenka
- President: Vladan Račić
- Head coach: Miloš Mitrović
- League: Serbian Handball Super B League
- 2020–21: 7
- Club colours
Home	Away

RK Crvenka (Serbian Cyrillic: РК Црвенка) is a Serbian handball club based in Crvenka. They compete in the Serbian Handball Super B League.

== History ==
The first handball club in Crvenka was established in 1952. They competed under the name RK Partizan. In 1959, the club merged with local club RK Jedinstvo to form RK Crvenka. They made their Yugoslav Championship debut in 1965. Two years later, the club won its first trophy, capturing the Yugoslav Cup. They achieved their greatest success by winning the national championship in 1969. The club would reach the European Cup semi-finals in the 1969–70 season.

Between 2008 and 2013, the club competed for five seasons in the Serbian Handball Super League. They earned promotion back to the top flight in 2020.

== Honours ==
Yugoslav League

- 1968–69

Yugoslav Cup

- 1966–67, 1987–88

== Sponsorship ==
During its history, the club has been known by a variety of names due to sponsorship reasons:

- Crvenka Jaffa Panon
- Crvenka Jaffa

== Notable players ==
The list includes players who played for their respective national teams in any major international tournaments, such as the Olympic Games, World Championships and European Championships:

- (Serbia) Novak Bošković
- (Serbia) Dalibor Čutura
- (Serbia) Dragan Marjanac
- (Serbia) Savo Mešter
- (Serbia) Dimitrije Pejanović
- (Serbia and Montenegro) Nebojša Jokić
- (Serbia and Montenegro) (Montenegro) Petar Kapisoda
- (Serbia and Montenegro) Predrag Peruničić
- (Serbia and Montenegro) Dragan Škrbić
- (Socialist Federal Republic of Yugoslavia) Čedomir Bugarski
- (Socialist Federal Republic of Yugoslavia) Jovica Elezović
- (Socialist Federal Republic of Yugoslavia) Petar Fajfrić
- (Socialist Federal Republic of Yugoslavia) Jožef Holpert
- (Socialist Federal Republic of Yugoslavia) Drago Jovović
- (Socialist Federal Republic of Yugoslavia) Đorđe Lavrnić
- (Socialist Federal Republic of Yugoslavia) Slobodan Mišković
- (Socialist Federal Republic of Yugoslavia) Stjepan Obran
- (Socialist Federal Republic of Yugoslavia) Radisav Pavićević
- (Serbia) Đurađ Trbojević
- (Socialist Federal Republic of Yugoslavia) Zlatko Portner
- (Socialist Federal Republic of Yugoslavia) (Slovenia) Rolando Pušnik
- (Socialist Federal Republic of Yugoslavia) Momir Rnić
- (Socialist Federal Republic of Yugoslavia) Zoran Živković

== Head coaches ==
- (Socialist Federal Republic of Yugoslavia) Vlado Štencl
- (Socialist Federal Republic of Yugoslavia) Milorad Lajić
- (Socialist Federal Republic of Yugoslavia) Slobodan Mišković
- (Serbia) Đurađ Trbojević (1999/2000)
- (Serbia and Montenegro) Dragan Nišević
- (Serbia and Montenegro) Milorad Lajić
- (Serbia) Svetozar Jovović
- (Serbia) Radosav Kovačević
- (Serbia) Svetozar Jovović
- (Serbia) Igor Desnica (2012)
- (Serbia) Dragan Kukić (2013)
- (Serbia) Radosav Kovačević
- (Serbia) Dragan Kukić
- (Serbia) Vladimir Zejak (2019–present)
