= Momir Rnić (handballer, born 1955) =

Serbian handball player

Personal information
- Full name: Momir Rnić
- Nationality: Serbian
- Born: 3 February 1955 (age 71) Sečanj, FPR Yugoslavia
- Height: 1.89 m (6 ft 2 in)

Sport
- Sport: Handball
- Position: Pivot
- Current club: Proleter Zrenjanin (head coach)

Youth career
- Years: Team
- –: Hercegovina Sečanj

Senior clubs
- Years: Team
- –: Proleter Zrenjanin
- –: Crvenka
- –: Proleter Zrenjanin
- 1986–1990: TV Niederwürzbach
National team
| Years | Team | Apps | (Gls) |
| 1978–1988 | Yugoslavia | 208 | (392) |

Teams managed
- –: Proleter Zrenjanin
- –: Proleter Zrenjanin
- –: Proleter Zrenjanin
- 2001–2003: TVA Saarbrücken
- 2004: Vojvodina
- –: Proleter Zrenjanin
- 2011–2012: Proleter Zrenjanin
- 2012–2013: Vojvodina
- 2016–2017: Proleter Zrenjanin
- 2020–: Proleter Zrenjanin
Medal record
Men's handball
Representing Yugoslavia
Olympic Games
| Gold medal – first place | 1984 Los Angeles | Team |
| Bronze medal – third place | 1988 Seoul | Team |
World Championship
| Gold medal – first place | 1986 Switzerland | Team |
| Silver medal – second place | 1982 West Germany | Team |
Mediterranean Games
| Gold medal – first place | 1979 Split | Team |
| Gold medal – first place | 1983 Casablanca | Team |

Momir Rnić (Serbian Cyrillic: Момир Рнић; born 3 February 1955) is a Serbian handball coach and former player who competed for Yugoslavia in the 1980 Summer Olympics, in the 1984 Summer Olympics, and in the 1988 Summer Olympics.

== Club career ==
After starting out at Hercegovina Sečanj, Rnić briefly played for Proleter Zrenjanin, before moving to Crvenka. He later returned to Proleter Zrenjanin. In 1986, Rnić moved abroad to TV Niederwürzbach. In 1987 he helped the team getting promoted to the 2nd Bundesliga and in 1989 to the 1st Bundesliga.

== International career ==
At international level, Rnić represented Yugoslavia and competed in three Olympic Games, winning the gold medal in 1984 and the bronze medal in 1988. He also participated in two World Championships, winning the 1986 edition. In 1986 he won gold medals, beating Hungary in the final 24-22.

== Coaching career ==
In 1990, Rnić became head coach of his former club Proleter Zrenjanin, taking them to the European Cup final in 1991 and winning the Yugoslav Championship in 1992.

Between 2001 and 2003, Rnić served as head coach of TVA Saarbrücken in the 2. Handball-Bundesliga. He took charge of Vojvodina in January 2004.

== Personal life ==
Rnić is the father of fellow handball player Momir Rnić.

== Honours ==
=== Player ===
TV Niederwürzbach

- 2. Handball-Bundesliga: 1988–89

=== Coach ===
Proleter Zrenjanin

- Yugoslav Handball Championship: 1991–92
