= Zoran Živković (handballer) =

Serbian handball player (born 1945)

Personal information
- Full name: Zoran Živković
- Nationality: Serbian
- Born: 5 April 1945 (age 81) Niš, DF Yugoslavia
- Height: 1.80 m (5 ft 11 in)

Sport
- Sport: Handball
- Position: Goalkeeper

Youth career
- Years: Team
- –: Železničar Niš

Senior clubs
- Years: Team
- –: Železničar Niš
- –: Crvenka
- –: FAP
- –: Metaloplastika
- –: Železničar Niš
National team
Years	Team	Apps
–	Yugoslavia	81

Teams managed
- –: FAP
- –: Železničar Niš
- 1981–1985: Metaloplastika
- –: Yugoslavia (assistant)
- –: Železničar Niš
- –: Yugoslavia
- 1990–1991: Crvena zvezda
- –: Kuwait
- 1995–1997: FR Yugoslavia
- –: Železničar Niš
- 1997–1999: FR Yugoslavia
- 1999–2001: Egypt
- 2001–2002: FR Yugoslavia
- 2002–2003: Egypt
- 2004: Tunisia
- 2005: Macedonia
- 2005: Vardar
- 2005–2007: Egypt
- 2008–2009: Tunisia
- 2011: Naissus
- 2009: Kuwait
Medal record
Men's handball
Representing Yugoslavia
Olympic Games
Gold medal – first place	1972 Munich	Team
Gold medal – first place	1984 Los Angeles	Staff
World Championship
Gold medal – first place	1986 Switzerland	Staff
Silver medal – second place	1982 West Germany	Staff
Mediterranean Games
Gold medal – first place	1967 Tunis	Team
Representing FR Yugoslavia
World Championship
Bronze medal – third place	1999 Egypt	Staff
European Championship
Bronze medal – third place	1996 Spain	Staff
Representing Egypt
African Championship
Gold medal – first place	2000 Algeria	Staff
Silver medal – second place	2006 Tunisia	Staff
Representing Tunisia
African Championship
Silver medal – second place	2004 Egypt	Staff

Zoran "Tuta" Živković (Serbian Cyrillic: Зоран Тута Живковић; born 5 April 1945) is a Serbian former handball coach and player. He has won olympic gold as both player and coach and the world championship as a coach for Yugoslavia.

== Club career ==
Živković started playing handball at his hometown club Železničar Niš, before moving to Crvenka. He would help them win the national championship in 1969. Later on, Živković played for and served as head coach of FAP. He also spent two seasons with Metaloplastika, before moving abroad to Germany.

== International career ==
At international level, Živković competed for Yugoslavia at the 1972 Summer Olympics, winning the gold medal.

== Coaching career ==
As the coach for Metaloplastika he won the 1984-85 European Cup.

He coached the Yugoslavia national team to a gold medal at the 1984 Olympics and 1986 World Championship. He also won silver medals at the 1982 World Championship, losing in extra time to the Soviet Union.

In his second tenure as head coach of FR Yugoslavia, Živković led the team to a third-place finish at the 1999 World Championship. He left his role in December 1999 and took charge of Egypt the same month. After placing seventh in the 2000 Summer Olympics, Živković reached the semi-finals at the 2001 World Championship, losing in the bronze medal match to FR Yugoslavia. This was the best performance by a non-European team until it was equaled by Tunisia in 2005 and beaten by Qatar in 2015.

In November 2001, Živković became head coach of FR Yugoslavia for the third time. He led the team at the 2002 European Championship, finishing in a disappointing 10th place. In July 2002, Živković stepped down from his position.

In February 2005, Živković was appointed as head coach by Macedonia for the nation's Euro 2006 qualifiers in June. He would take charge at Macedonian club Vardar during the summer, but left for personal reasons in October of the same year.

In September 2008, Živković was appointed as head coach for Tunisia ahead of the 2009 World Championship. He was dismissed from his position after placing 17th in the tournament.

He then took over as the head coach of Kuwait.

== Honours ==
=== Player ===
Crvenka

- Yugoslav Handball Championship: 1968–69
- Yugoslav Handball Cup: 1966–67

Železničar Niš

- Yugoslav Handball Cup: 1976–77

=== Coach ===
Železničar Niš

- Yugoslav Handball Cup: 1976–77, 1984–85
- Handball Cup of FR Yugoslavia: 1996–97, 1998–99

Metaloplastika

- Yugoslav Handball Championship: 1982, 1983, 1984, 1985
- EHF Champions League: 1985
