= Jaffa Cakes =

British snack food

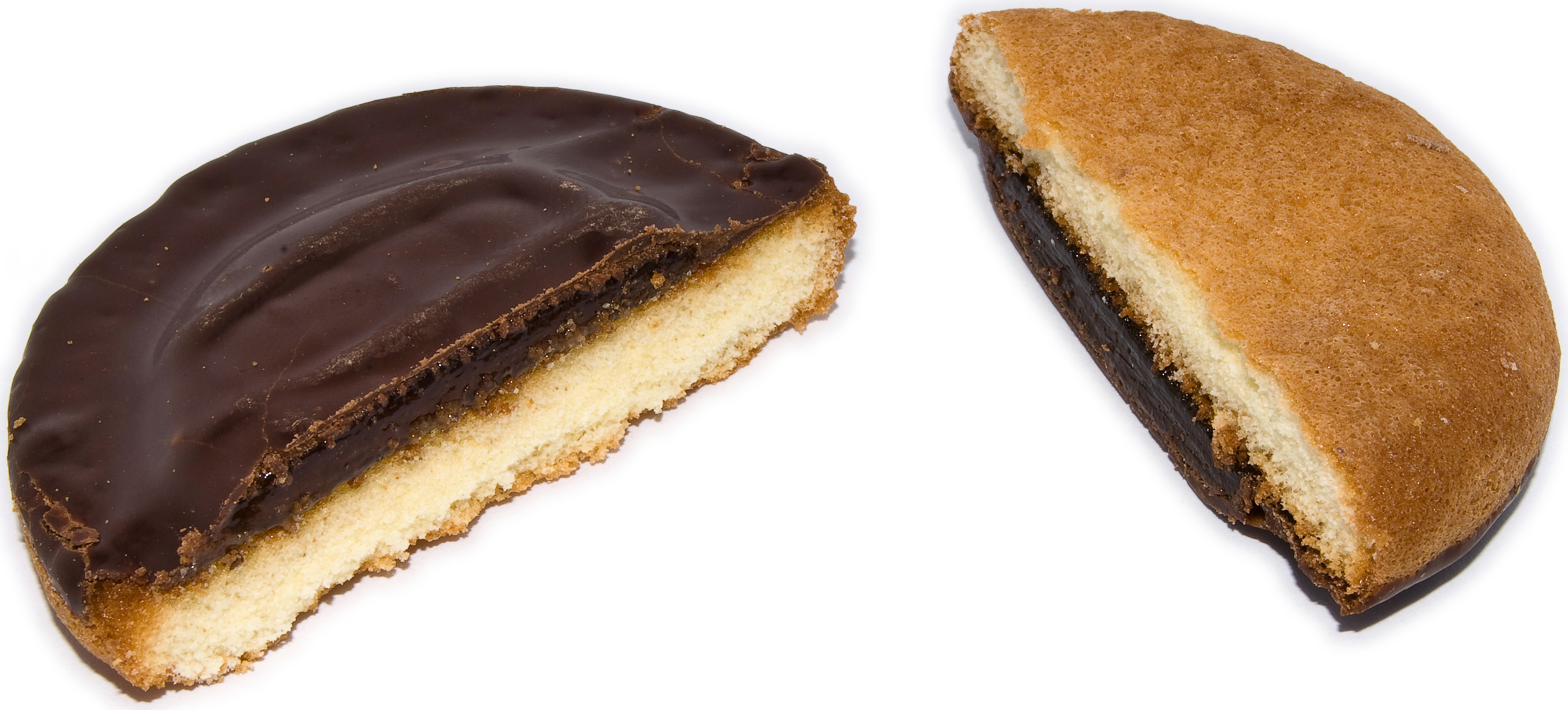
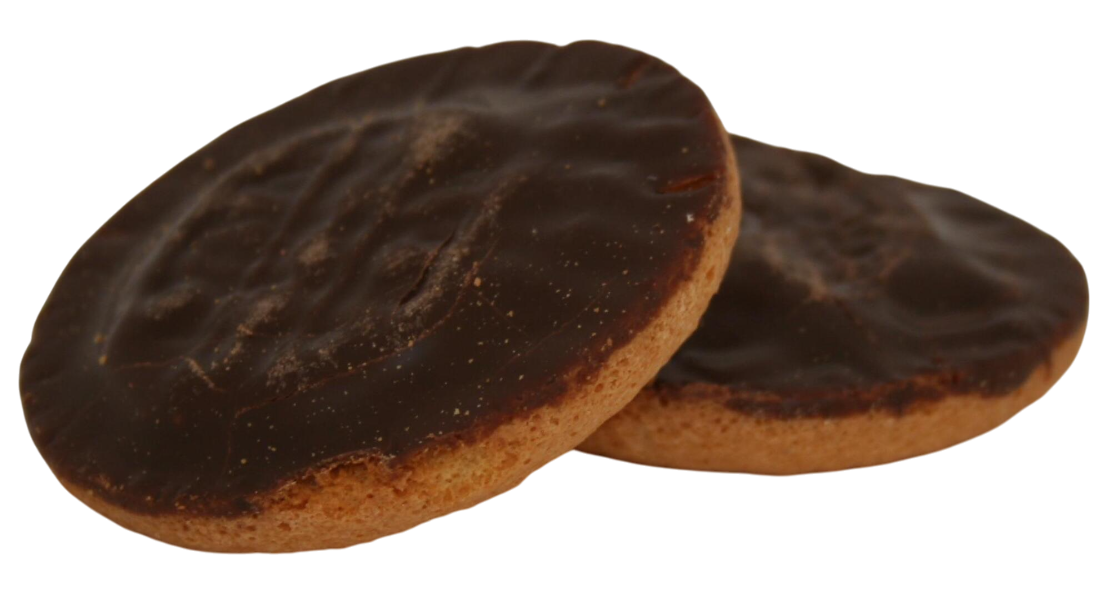
- A Jaffa Cake cut in half and two Jaffa Cakes stacked together
- Alternative names: Jaffa
- Type: Cake
- Place of origin: United Kingdom
- Created by: McVitie and Price
- Main ingredients: Sponge, orange-flavoured jam, chocolate
- Variations: Various limited edition flavours (lemon and lime, strawberry, black currant)

Jaffa Cakes are a cake introduced by McVitie and Price in the UK in 1927 and named after Jaffa oranges. In their most common form, Jaffa cakes are circular, 2 1/8 inches (54 mm) in diameter, and have three layers: a Genoise sponge base, a layer of orange-flavoured jam, and a coating of chocolate. Jaffa Cakes are also available as bars or in small packs, and in larger and smaller sizes. The original Jaffa Cakes now come in packs of 10, 20, 30, or 40, having been downsized in 2017 from 12 or 24 per pack.

Because McVitie's did not register the name "Jaffa Cakes" as a trademark, other biscuit manufacturers and supermarkets have made similar products under the same name. The product's classification as a cake or biscuit was part of a VAT tribunal in 1991, with the court finding in McVitie's favour that Jaffa Cakes should be considered cakes and not biscuits for tax purposes. In 2012 they were ranked the best selling cake or biscuit in the United Kingdom.

== Description ==
Jaffa Cakes are small snack cakes on the borderline between cakes and biscuits. Generally circular in shape and around 54 mm in diameter, they consist of three layers: a soft genoise sponge base, topped with a layer of orange-flavored jam, and a chocolate coating over the jam. The main ingredients for the sponge are flour, sugar, eggs, and a small amount of water. Other ingredients include vegetable oil, humectants, leavening agents such as baking powder, and salt. The ingredients are premixed to create a batter before being beaten to aerate the mix and create the right consistency. Baking takes around 6–9 minutes. After baking, the sponge is allowed to cool before the jam layer is added. This is again allowed to cool before the jam is enrobed in chocolate.

External videos
- "These are how Jaffa Cakes are made inside McVitie’s Manchester factory" A video showing how McVitie's brand Jaffa Cakes are made

Jaffa Cakes can be eaten in one or two bites, although some consumers enjoy eating around the edges first or eating the jam separately to the rest of the cake. Articles in the popular media have debated the proper way to eat Jaffa Cakes, including whether the chocolate side should be face-up or face-down when eating. An article in the International Journal of Food Design questioned the idea of a "proper" way to eat the snacks, but suggested that eating them with the chocolate side face-up would be more visually appealing and increase the contribution of the sense of smell to the taste of the chocolate. (Note: A similar debate concerns how suitable Jaffa cakes are to being dunked in tea.)

== History ==
Jaffa Cakes were first produced by the British biscuit company McVitie & Price in 1927. McVitie & Price named them Jaffa Cakes after Jaffa oranges, a popular variety of orange in Britain at the time. However, the jam for Jaffa Cakes was made from apricot jam and tangerine oil. According to the chef and food author J. P. McMahon, the reference to Jaffa oranges was chosen to evoke their sweet taste and Mediterranean origin. The name was not trademarked and has since become a generic term, allowing other manufacturers to create similar products under the same name.

With the rationalisation of McVitie & Price's production throughout World War II, its range of biscuits fell from 370 to just 10 by 1945, and Jaffa Cakes stopped being produced. During this time, McVitie & Price collaborated closely with rival biscuit makers MacFarlane Lang, and the two companies merged in 1948 to form United Biscuits. During the 1950s, Jaffa Cakes were reintroduced and began to be mass produced, with more than 10,000 tins produced daily.

Starting in 1967, McVitie's increased the prominence of its name on Jaffa Cakes branding to create a master brand to boost sales of its less popular biscuits. At the time, McVitie's Jaffa Cakes was one of the top six brands of biscuits in the UK. In the 1970s, the company introduced a cartoon character called McV to advertise Jaffa Cakes to children. It was featured in TV advertisements with other cartoon characters including munchkins and in special promotions like tie-in T-shirts. Other adverts at the time included one featuring Victor Spinetti as a Mexican bandit and Jaffa Cakes thief.

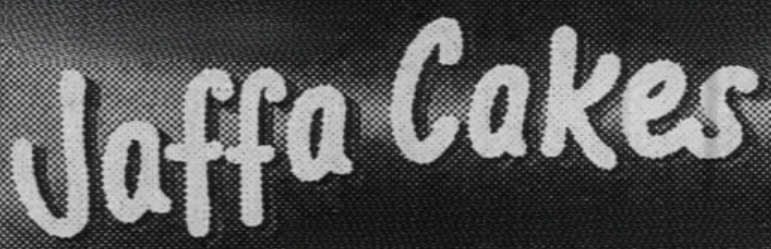
McVitie's Jaffa Cakes logo as it appeared in 1991 during the United Biscuits v Burton's Biscuits case; it is a generic typeface logo

McVitie's Jaffa Cakes logo after a redesign in 1994; it is more distinctive, featuring an orange peel theme, and allowed McVitie's to trademark their logo

Burton's Biscuits began selling a competing brand of Jaffa cakes in the early 1960s. In 1991, after the release of lemon and lime flavour Jaffa Cakes by Burton's, United Biscuits sued Burton's for "passing off" its Jaffa Cakes as McVitie's due to their similar packaging. The judge dismissed survey evidence presented by McVitie's and they lost the case. According to the ruling, the only distinctive element of their Jaffa Cakes packaging was the McVitie's logo, which Burton's had not copied. In 1994, a new orange peel themed Jaffa Cakes logo was designed for McVitie's by Design Bridge. The design was more distinctive compared to the previous generic typeface and allowed McVitie's to trademark the logo.

Later in 1991, Inland Revenue challenged Jaffa cakes' legal status as a VAT-free cake, arguing that they were marketed as chocolate-covered biscuits and should therefore be subject to VAT. McVitie's defended Jaffa cakes' legal status as a cake in a VAT tribunal and—despite their recent legal dispute—Burton's sent their own experts to assist with the case. The tribunal ruled that Jaffa cakes were legally cakes. During the case, McVitie's produced a 12-inch Jaffa Cake to show that a Jaffa Cake's size is irrelevant to its status as cake, and famously argued that cakes harden as they go stale while biscuits go soft. The judge also listed multiple other considerations. The case was widely covered, and mocked, in the national newspapers.

== McVitie's Jaffa Cakes ==
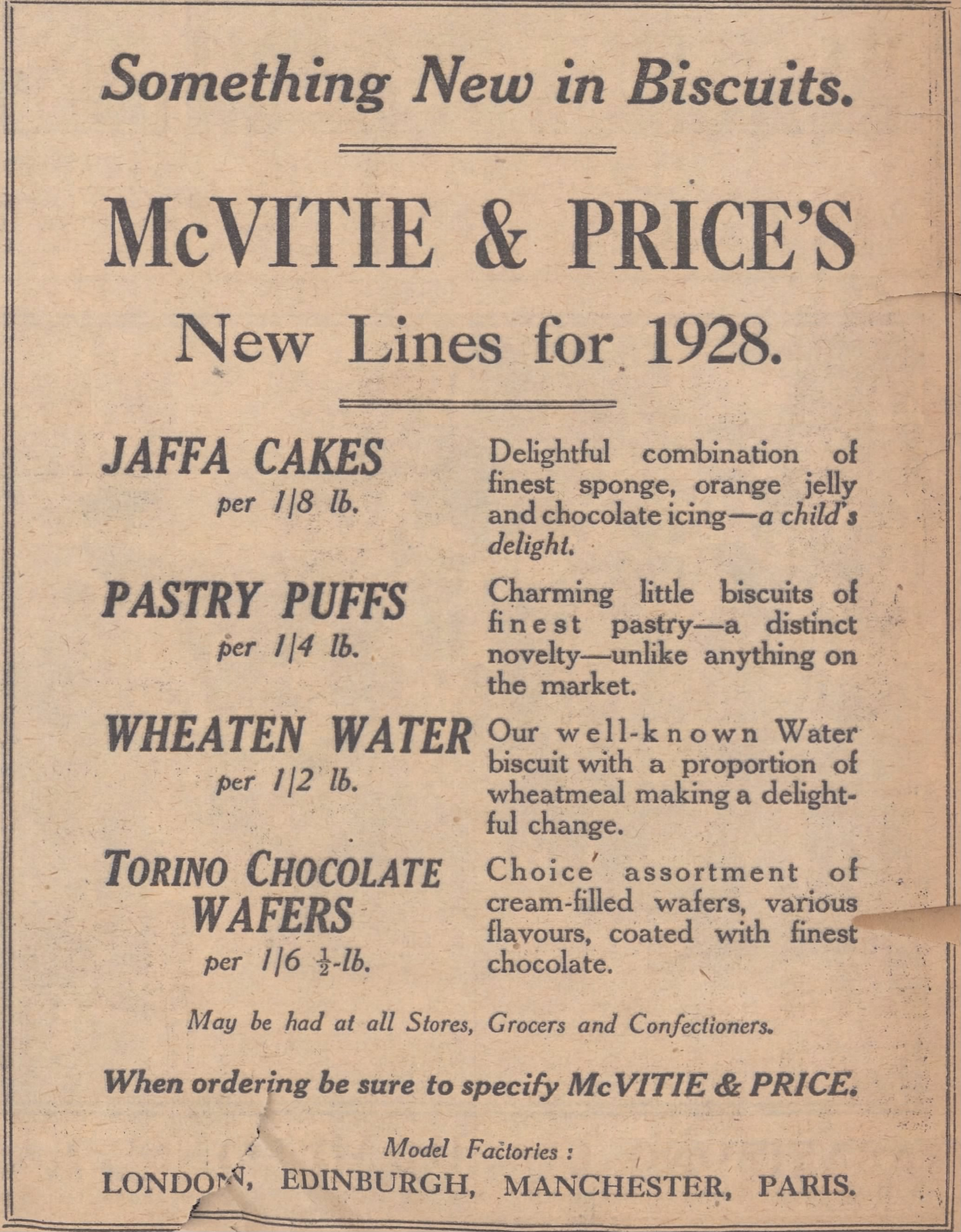
A 1928 newspaper advertisement for McVitie & Price, featuring the newly introduced Jaffa Cakes

=== Manufacture ===
McVitie's entire line of Jaffa Cakes are produced at the McVitie's factory in Stockport. The Jaffa Cake production area covers an acre (44,000 sq ft; 4,000 m^{2}) and includes a production line over a mile (1.6 km) long. In the early 2000s, it pioneered the development of advanced machine vision technology for quality control.

=== Flavour variants ===
Although Jaffa Cakes are usually orange flavour, limited edition flavours have been available, such as lemon-and-lime, strawberry and blackcurrant. McVities launched limited-edition pineapple flavour Jaffa Cakes in early 2020. In early 2021, McVitie's unveiled the new flavours cherry and passionfruit. In mid 2023, McVitie's launched Raspberry flavour Jaffa Cakes. In June 2024, McVitie's launched Cola Bottle flavour Jaffa Cakes. In January 2026 McVitie's launched Hot Honey and Yuzu Lemon Flavour Variants.

=== Advertising ===
In 2021 McVitie & Price launched a £4.7 million advertising and social media campaign to promote the brand. Its recent advertising stresses the product's identity as a cake. For instance, a 2024 billboard says "Stand here if you think it's a cake" on one side and "Stand here if you're an idiot" on the other side.

== Classification and taxation ==
In the United Kingdom, value added tax (VAT) is payable on chocolate-covered biscuits, but not on cakes of any kind. When VAT was introduced in 1973, Jaffa Cakes were treated as cakes for the purpose of VAT, but this classification was challenged by HM Customs and Excise in 1991 who argued that Jaffa Cakes should be taxed as chocolate-covered biscuits.

A tribunal was held to decide how Jaffa Cakes should be legally classified for VAT. The presiding judge, Donald Potter, considered the "ordinary meaning" of the word cake, rejecting any consideration of the purpose of VAT legislation in determining what would count as a cake. The court also discounted expert evidence, as it went "beyond the capacity of an ordinary purchaser". Potter concluded that while there is no strict dividing line between cakes and biscuits in ordinary language, and while Jaffa Cakes had characteristics of both cakes and biscuits, they had "sufficient characteristics of cakes to qualify as cakes" and hence to be zero rated for VAT. The ruling was based on the following criteria:

- The product's name was regarded as a minor consideration.
- The ingredients were regarded as similar to those of a cake, producing a thin cake-like mixture rather than the thick dough of a biscuit.
- The product's texture was regarded as being that of a sponge cake.
- The product hardens when stale, in the manner of a cake.
- A substantial part of a Jaffa Cake, in terms of bulk and texture, is sponge.
- In size, a Jaffa Cake is more like a biscuit than a cake.
- The product was generally displayed for sale alongside other biscuits, rather than with cakes.
- The product is presented as a snack and eaten with the fingers, like a biscuit, rather than with a fork as a cake might be. The tribunal also considered that children would eat them in a few mouthfuls, in the manner of a sweet.

According to Christopher Mark Hutton, the decision prioritised the material properties of the Jaffa Cake (its ingredients and composition) over social factors such as its packaging and marketing. Ross Charnock analysed the case as focusing on stereotypical features of cakes rather than comparison to prototypical examples.

The tribunal has been viewed by tax experts as an example of the complexity and market distortions arising from multiple tax levels and the use of ambiguous categories. It has been cited as an example of expensive litigation resulting from different tax rates for similar products. It spawned further legal disputes, in particular Marks & Spencer argued that it should be refunded VAT it paid on its chocolate teacakes. It has also been used as an example of arbitrary distinctions in tax law and the "absurd tests" that need to be used when there is not an underlying policy purpose or principle to different tax rates.

The debate over classification has aroused interest from philosophers like Tim Crane who view it as an example of how concepts relate to reality. Crane argues that the classification of Jaffa Cakes is more than a matter of definition, and relates to their essential features, which he agrees are cake-like. By contrast, Cristian Constantinescu argues that the question is indeterminate, and Tim Juvshik states that their classification is a matter of stipulation and social convention. Roy Sorensen cites the case as an example of vagueness forcing judges to answer unanswerable questions. Others argue that a binary dichotomy is problematic and Jaffa Cakes are neither cake nor biscuit, but something in-between.

The Irish Revenue Commissioners also classify Jaffa Cakes as cakes, since their moisture content is greater than 12%. As a result, they are charged the reduced rate of VAT (13.5% as of 2016).

== Other brands ==
=== United Kingdom ===
In the United Kingdom, McVitie's is the largest brand of Jaffa Cakes. According to a 2019 report by The Grocer, almost one third of households in the UK buy McVitie's Jaffa Cakes each year. As of 2023, they produce 1.4 billion Jaffa Cakes each year. However, McVitie's faces competition from other brand names and supermarket own brand products. Burton's Biscuits began selling a competing brand of Jaffa cakes in the early 1960s.

Burton's has produced Jaffa cakes under a variety of brands since the 1990s. Under license from Coca-Cola Schweppes, they began producing a Kia-Ora branded version of Jaffa cakes in 1996 in an attempt to win market share from McVitie's, which then held over half of the Jaffa cake market according to Nielsen. In 2005, Burton's again started producing a licensed version of Jaffa cakes, this time using Cadbury Jaffa Cakes branding. With a revamp of their Lyons brand in 2012, Burton's began selling Lyons Jaffa Cakes.

Bahlsen released a "Messino" brand of oblong-shaped Jaffa Cakes in 2009; they were branded as a more luxury, upmarket version of Jaffa Cakes. They were rebranded "Luxury Jaffa Cakes" in 2019.

Asda launched a supersize Jaffa Cake weighing 820 grammes and designed to serve 12 people in 2026.

=== Europe ===
In 1969, the Finnish company Fazer launched its own brand of Jaffa biscuits. They were sold to Danone as a part of a sub-brand of LU in the 1990s and then to Mondelez before being re-acquired by Fazer in 2016. As of 2026, Mondelez continues to produce LU branded PiM's cakes in the Benelux region. Mondelez has also produced these cakes under the names Čokopiškoty and Milka Choco Jaffa. Another brand, Delicje, by the confectionary company E. Wedel, began production in 1976 in Poland. As of 2020, the Delicje brand belongs to Mondelez International. As of 2026, the Polish company Lusima also produces Jaffa cakes and markets them in Poland, Sweden, Finland, Hungary, Italy and other countries.

Under a licensing deal with McVitie's, Jaffa Crvenka was provided access to a United Biscuits factory in February 1975 to gain the technical knowledge to produce Jaffa cakes in a newly built factory in Yugoslavia. Production began later in the year and the Jaffa cakes became available in 1976. The brand contines to sell Jaffa Cakes in Serbia.

=== North America ===
In the United States, Aldi has sold Jaffa Cakes during its yearly "German Week" before 2025 and as a permanent item under its Benton's brand since then.

== Popularity and public perception ==
Jaffa Cakes are one of the most popular brand of snack foods in the UK. According to YouGov data from 2018, 73% of adults in the UK had a favourable view of Jaffa Cakes, making them the fourth most popular brand of biscuit in the country. YouGov data also placed them as the third most popular snack food in the UK in 2021. According to a 2019 article in The Grocer, almost a third of all households in the UK buy Jaffa Cakes each year.

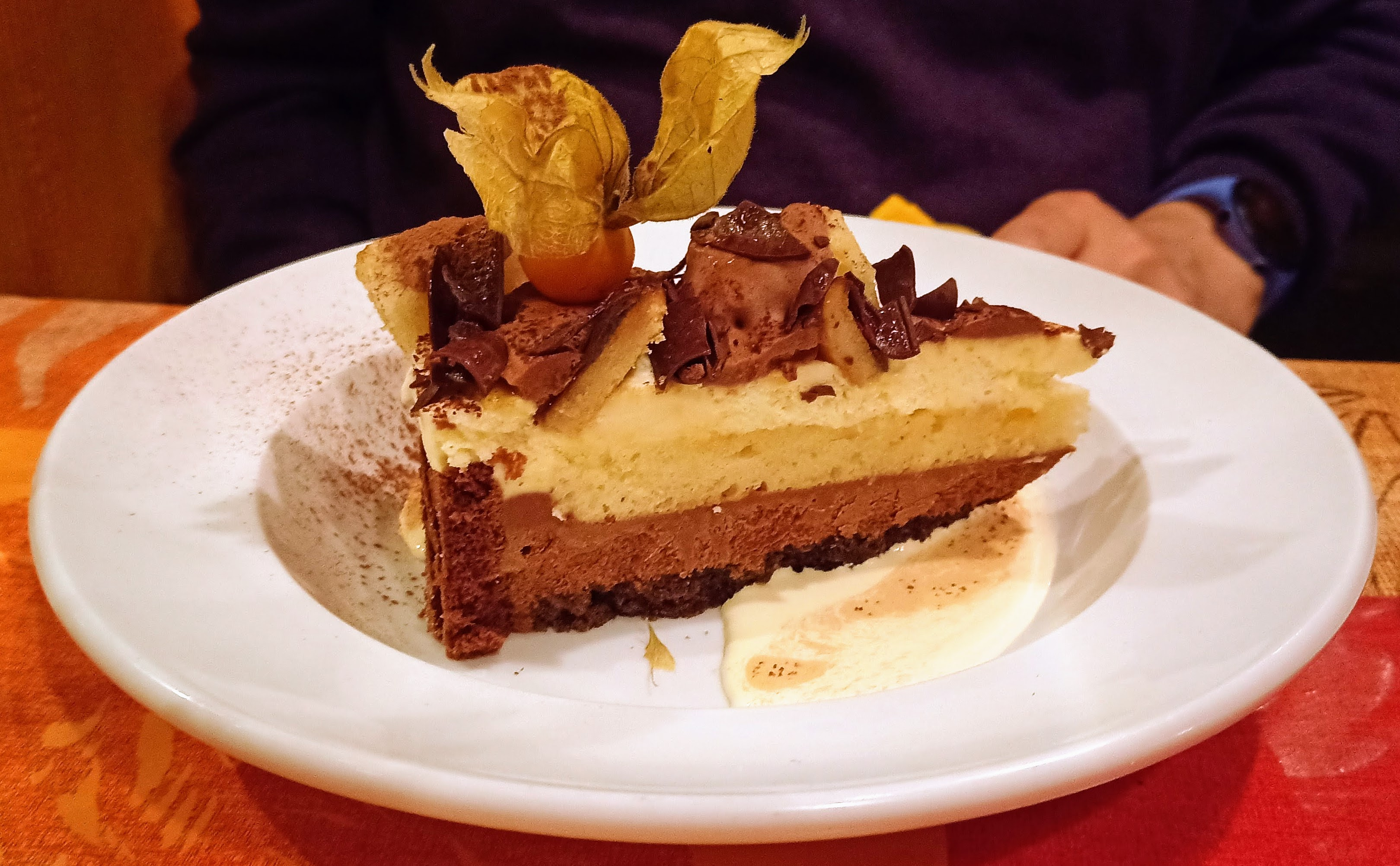
A dessert inspired by Jaffa Cakes served at a restaurant

Numerous chefs have created their own versions of Jaffa Cakes, including Bryn Williams at Odette's, Marcus Wareing at The Gilbert Scott, Gary Rhodes at City Rhodes, Peter Gordon at a club on Green Street, Sarah Barber at Hotel Café Royal, and Sarah Mountain at the Londoner Hotel. Recipes have also been produced by The Great British Bake Off judges Paul Hollywood and Mary Berry, and Jaffa Cakes were included as a challenge in the seventh series of the show.

Jaffa Cakes are less well-known worldwide. With the acquisition of the Jaffa Cakes manufacturer United Biscuits by Yildiz in 2014, a Mintel analyst stated that Jaffa Cakes were a regional brand and not an international "power brand". In the 2017 series of the French adaption of The Great British Bake Off, Le Meilleur Pâtissier, contestants were asked to bake Jaffa Cakes, but most of the contestants did not know what Jaffa Cakes were.

== See also ==
- List of cakes
