= Zorica Vojinović =

Serbian handball player (born 1958)

Olympic medal record

Women's Handball
Silver medal – second place	1980 Moscow	Team

Zorica Vojinović (Serbian Cyrillic: Зорица Војиновић; born June 27, 1958, in Crvenka, Serbia, FPR Yugoslavia) is a former Yugoslav/Serbian handball player who competed in the 1980 Summer Olympics.

In 1980, she won a silver medal as part of the Yugoslav team. She participated in all five matches and scored two goals.
