= RK Železničar Niš =

Serbian handball club

- Full name: Rukometni klub Železničar Niš
- Founded: 1949
- Dissolved: 2009
- Arena: SC Čair
- Capacity: 4,000
- Club colours
Home	Away

RK Železničar Niš (Serbian Cyrillic: РК Железничар Ниш) was a Serbian handball club based in Niš.

== History ==
The club played its first competitive game on 26 July 1949, which is considered to be the club's foundation date. They went on to compete in the Yugoslav Championship for over 20 seasons. In 1976–77, the club won its first trophy, the Yugoslav Cup. They subsequently reached the Cup Winners' Cup final in 1978, losing to VfL Gummersbach.

On 7 September 2009, the club merged with ORK Niš to form RK Naissus.

== Honours ==
Yugoslav Cup / FR Yugoslavia Cup

- 1976–77, 1981–82, 1984–85 / 1996–97, 1998–99

== Sponsorship ==
During its history, the club has been known by a variety of names due to sponsorship reasons:

- Jugopetrol Železničar
- NIS Petrol Železničar

== Notable players ==
The list includes players who played for their respective national teams in any major international tournaments, such as the Olympic Games, World Championships and European Championships:

- (Croatia) Tonči Peribonio
- (Serbia) Dalibor Čutura
- (Serbia) Ivan Gajić
- (Serbia) Miloš Kostadinović
- (Serbia) (North Macedonia) Nemanja Pribak
- (Serbia and Montenegro) (Serbia) Ivan Lapčević
- (Serbia and Montenegro) Predrag Peruničić
- (Socialist Federal Republic of Yugoslavia) Časlav Grubić
- (Socialist Federal Republic of Yugoslavia) Dragan Mladenović
- (Socialist Federal Republic of Yugoslavia) (Slovenia) Rolando Pušnik
- (Socialist Federal Republic of Yugoslavia) Zoran Živković

== Head coaches ==
- (Socialist Federal Republic of Yugoslavia) Zoran Živković
- (Socialist Federal Republic of Yugoslavia) Sava Đorđević
- (Serbia and Montenegro) Zoran Živković
- (Serbia and Montenegro) Svetislav Jovanović
