= Dane Šijan =

Serbian handball player (born 1977)

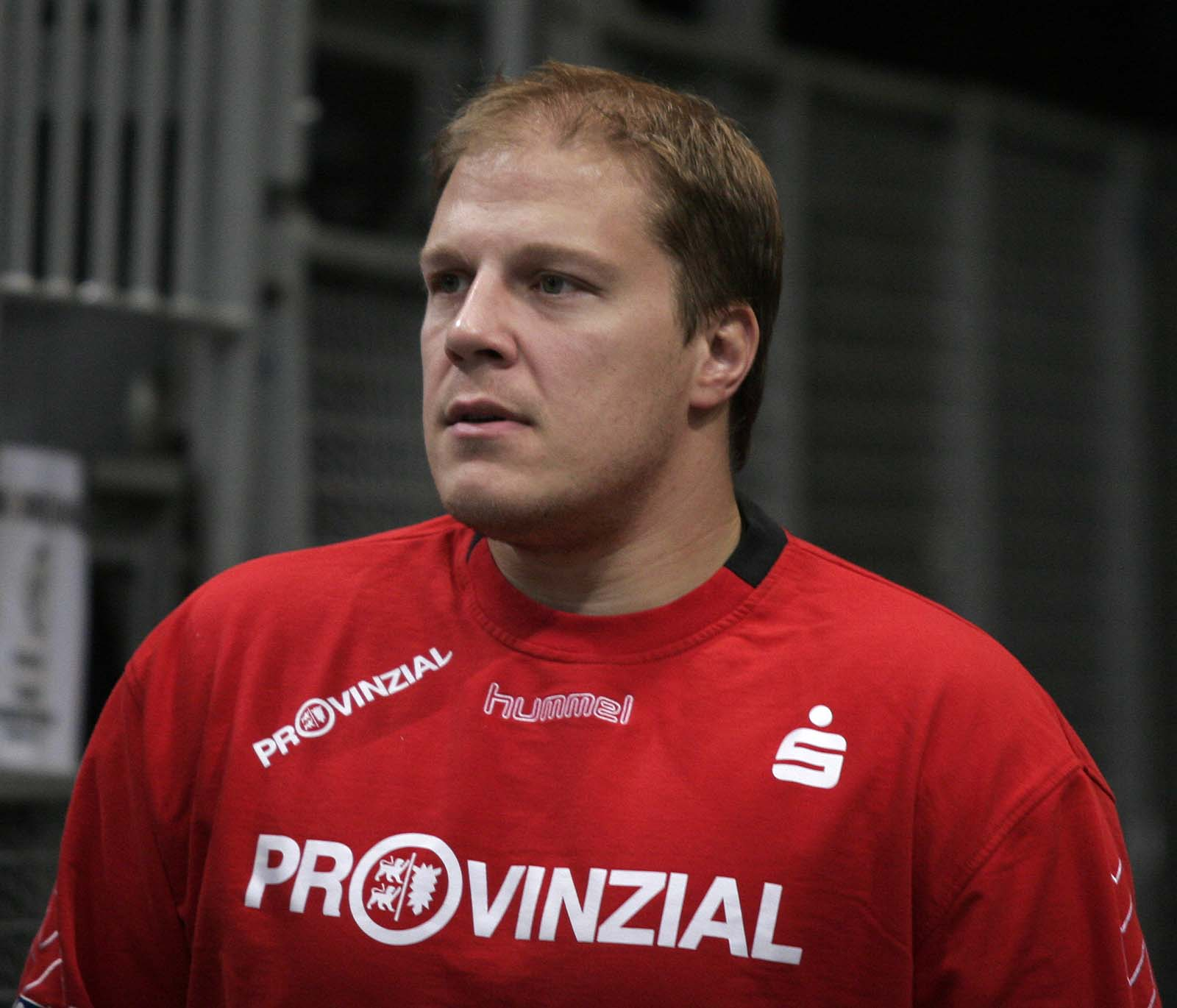
- Šijan in 2007

Personal information
- Full name: Dane Šijan
- Nationality: Serbian
- Born: 5 February 1977 (age 49) Šabac, SFR Yugoslavia
- Height: 1.95 m (6 ft 5 in)

Sport
- Sport: Handball
- Position: Goalkeeper

Youth career
- Years: Team
- –: Metaloplastika

Senior clubs
- Years: Team
- –: Metaloplastika
- –: Proleter Zrenjanin
- –: Rudar Kostolac
- 2001–2003: Partizan
- 2003–2005: IF Guif
- 2005–2007: Viborg HK
- 2007–2008: SG Flensburg-Handewitt
- 2008–2012: Viborg HK
- 2012–2014: Bjerringbro-Silkeborg
- 2014–2016: Mors-Thy
- 2016–2018: Dobrogea Sud Constanța
National team
- Years: Team
- –: Serbia and Montenegro
- 2006–2008: Serbia

Dane Šijan (Serbian Cyrillic: Дане Шијан; born 5 February 1977) is a Serbian former handball player.

== Club career ==
Over the course of his career that spanned more than two decades, Šijan played for Metaloplastika, Proleter Zrenjanin, Rudar Kostolac, Partizan (2001–2003), IF Guif (2003–2005), Viborg HK (2005–2007 and 2008–2012), SG Flensburg-Handewitt (2007–2008), Bjerringbro-Silkeborg (2012–2014), Mors-Thy (2014–2016) and Dobrogea Sud Constanța (2016–2018).

== International career ==
At international level, Šijan represented Serbia and Montenegro at the 2004 European Championship. He played for Serbia since its inception in 2006 until 2008.

== Honours ==
Partizan

- Handball Championship of FR Yugoslavia: 2001–02, 2002–03

Dobrogea Sud Constanța

- Cupa României: 2017–18
- Supercupa României: 2017
