= Slobodan Mišković =

Serbian handball player (1944-1997)

Personal information
- Full name: Slobodan Mišković
- Nationality: Serbian
- Born: 12 December 1944 DF Yugoslavia
- Died: 4 July 1997 (aged 52) FR Yugoslavia
- Height: 1.85 m (6 ft 1 in)

Sport
- Sport: Handball
- Position: Centre back

Senior clubs
- Years: Team
- 1962–1975: Crvenka
- 1975–1977: Sloga Doboj
National team
- Years: Team
- 1967–1974: Yugoslavia

Teams managed
- 1975–1977: Sloga Doboj
- 1977–1982: Celje
- 1983–1985: Crvenka
- 1985–1990: Proleter Zrenjanin
Medal record
Men's handball
Representing Yugoslavia
Olympic Games
Gold medal – first place	1972 Munich	Team
World Championship
Bronze medal – third place	1974 East Germany	Team

Slobodan "Čile" Mišković (Serbian Cyrillic: Слободан Чиле Мишковић; 12 December 1944 – 4 July 1997) was a Serbian handball coach and player who competed for Yugoslavia in the 1972 Summer Olympics.

== Club career ==
Mišković started out at Crvenka, making his senior debut in 1962. He was a member of the team that qualified for the Yugoslav Championship for the first time ever in 1965. Later on, Mišković helped them win their first trophy, the Yugoslav Cup, in 1967 and their first Yugoslav Championship title in 1969.

== International career ==
At international level, Mišković represented Yugoslavia between 1967 and 1974. He was a member of the team that won the gold medal at the 1972 Summer Olympics in Munich. In his last appearance at a major tournament, the 1974 World Championship in East Germany, Mišković helped the team win the bronze medal.

== Coaching career ==
From 1975 to 1977, Mišković played for and served as head coach of Sloga Doboj. He subsequently coached Celje, before returning to his mother club Crvenka in 1983. Between 1985 and 1990, Mišković served as head coach of Proleter Zrenjanin, winning the Yugoslav Championship in 1989–90.

== Honours ==
=== Player ===
Crvenka

- Yugoslav Handball Championship: 1968–69
- Yugoslav Handball Cup: 1966–67

=== Coach ===
Proleter Zrenjanin

- Yugoslav Handball Championship: 1989–90
