= Petar Fajfrić =

Serbian handball player (1942–2021)

Personal information
- Full name: Petar Fajfrić
- Nationality: Serbian
- Born: 15 February 1942 Berkasovo, Croatia
- Died: 11 March 2021 (aged 79) Šabac, Serbia
- Height: 1.80 m (5 ft 11 in)

Sport
- Sport: Handball
- Position: Left wing

Senior clubs
- Years: Team
- 196x–196x: Mladost Zemun
- 196x–196x: Crvena zvezda
- –: Dinamo Pančevo
- –: Crvenka
- 197x–197x: Metaloplastika
- –: Proleter Zrenjanin
National team
- Years: Team
- 196x–197x: Yugoslavia

Teams managed
- –: Metaloplastika
Medal record
Men's handball
Representing Yugoslavia
Olympic Games
| Gold medal – first place | 1972 Munich | Team |
World Championship
| Bronze medal – third place | 1970 Paris | Team |
| Bronze medal – third place | 1974 East Germany | Team |
Mediterranean Games
| Gold medal – first place | 1967 Tunis | Team |

Petar Fajfrić (Serbian Cyrillic: Петар Фајфрић; 15 February 1942 – 11 March 2021) was a Serbian handball coach and player who competed for Yugoslavia in the 1972 Summer Olympics.

== Club career ==
Over the course of his career that spanned over two decades, Fajfrić played for Mladost Zemun, Crvena zvezda, Dinamo Pančevo, Crvenka, Metaloplastika and Proleter Zrenjanin.

== International career ==
At international level, Fajfrić competed for Yugoslavia at the 1972 Summer Olympics, winning the gold medal. He also participated in two World Championships (1970 and 1974), bringing home a bronze medal on both occasions.

== Personal life ==
Fajfrić is the father of fellow handball players Zoran Fajfrić and Sandra Kolaković. He died from COVID-19 during the COVID-19 pandemic in Serbia, aged 79.
