= Rolando Pušnik =

Slovenian handball player

Personal information
- Full name: Rolando Pušnik
- Nationality: Slovenian
- Born: 13 December 1961 (age 64) Celje, FPR Yugoslavia
- Height: 1.88 m (6 ft 2 in)

Sport
- Sport: Handball
- Position: Goalkeeper

Youth career
- Years: Team
- –: Celje

Senior clubs
- Years: Team
- –: Celje
- –: Crvenka
- –: Železničar Niš
- 1990–1991: Mepamsa San Antonio
- 1991–1993: Zagreb
- 1993–1995: Celje
- –: Prevent Slovenj Gradec
- –: Slovan
- –: Zagreb
- 1999–2000: Metković
- –: SG Handball West Wien
- –: Trimo Trebnje
- 2003–2004: Padova
National team
Years	Team	Apps	
–	Yugoslavia	137	
1992–200x	Slovenia	114	(4)
Medal record
Men's handball
Representing Yugoslavia
Olympic Games
Gold medal – first place	1984 Los Angeles	Team
Bronze medal – third place	1988 Seoul	Team
World Championship
Gold medal – first place	1986 Switzerland	Team
Representing Slovenia
Mediterranean Games
Bronze medal – third place	1993 Languedoc-Roussillon	Team

Rolando Pušnik (born 13 December 1961) is a Slovenian former handball player.

== Club career ==
Over the course of his career that spanned over 25 years, Pušnik played for Celje (two spells), Crvenka, Železničar Niš, Mepamsa San Antonio, Zagreb (two spells), Prevent Slovenj Gradec, Slovan, Metković, SG Handball West Wien, Trimo Trebnje, and Padova. He won back-to-back European Cup titles with Zagreb in 1992 and 1993.

== International career ==
At international level, Pušnik competed for Yugoslavia in two Olympic Games, winning the gold medal in 1984 and the bronze medal in 1988. He was also a member of the team that won the 1986 World Championship.

After the breakup of Yugoslavia, Pušnik represented Slovenia in four European Championships (1994, 1996, 2000 and 2002). He also participated in the 1995 World Championship and in the 2000 Summer Olympics.

== Honours ==
Zagreb

- European Cup: 1991–92, 1992–93

Metković

- EHF Cup: 1999–2000
