= Crvenka =

Crvenka Црвенка (Serbian)
- Large town
- Crvenka
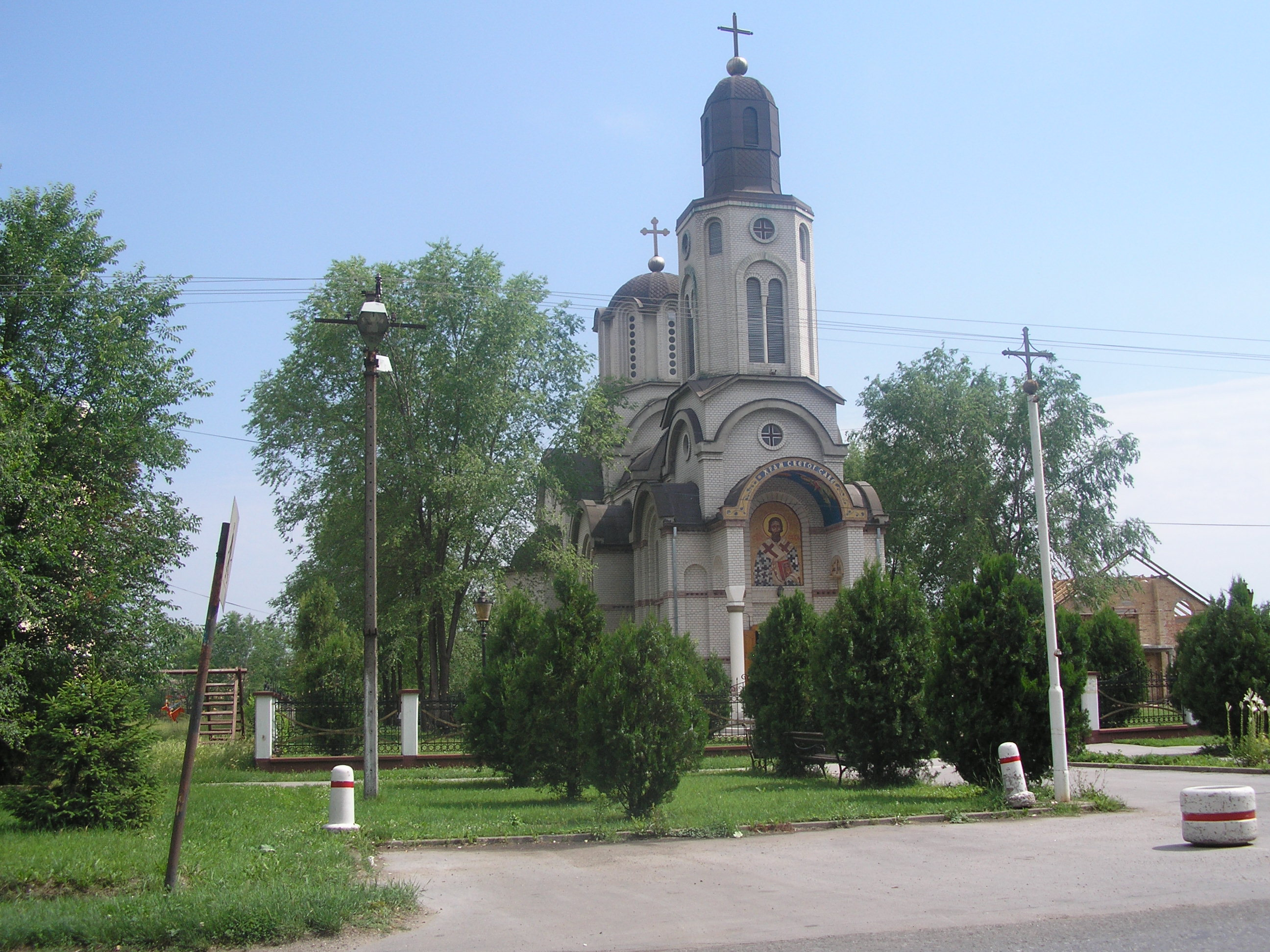

- Location within Vojvodina Location within Serbia Location within Europe
- Coordinates: 45°39′30″N 19°27′20″E
- Country: Serbia
- Province: Vojvodina
- Region: Bačka
- District: West Bačka
- Municipality: Kula
- Establishment: Inhabited during the early Neolithic

Government
  - Mayor: Hortik Peča
- Elevation: 86 m (282 ft)

Population (2011)
  - Total: ▼9,001
  - Density: 142/km^{2} (370/sq mi)
- Time zone: UTC+1 (CET)
  - Summer (DST): UTC+2 (CEST)
- Postal code: 25220
- Area code: (+381) 25
- Car plates: KU

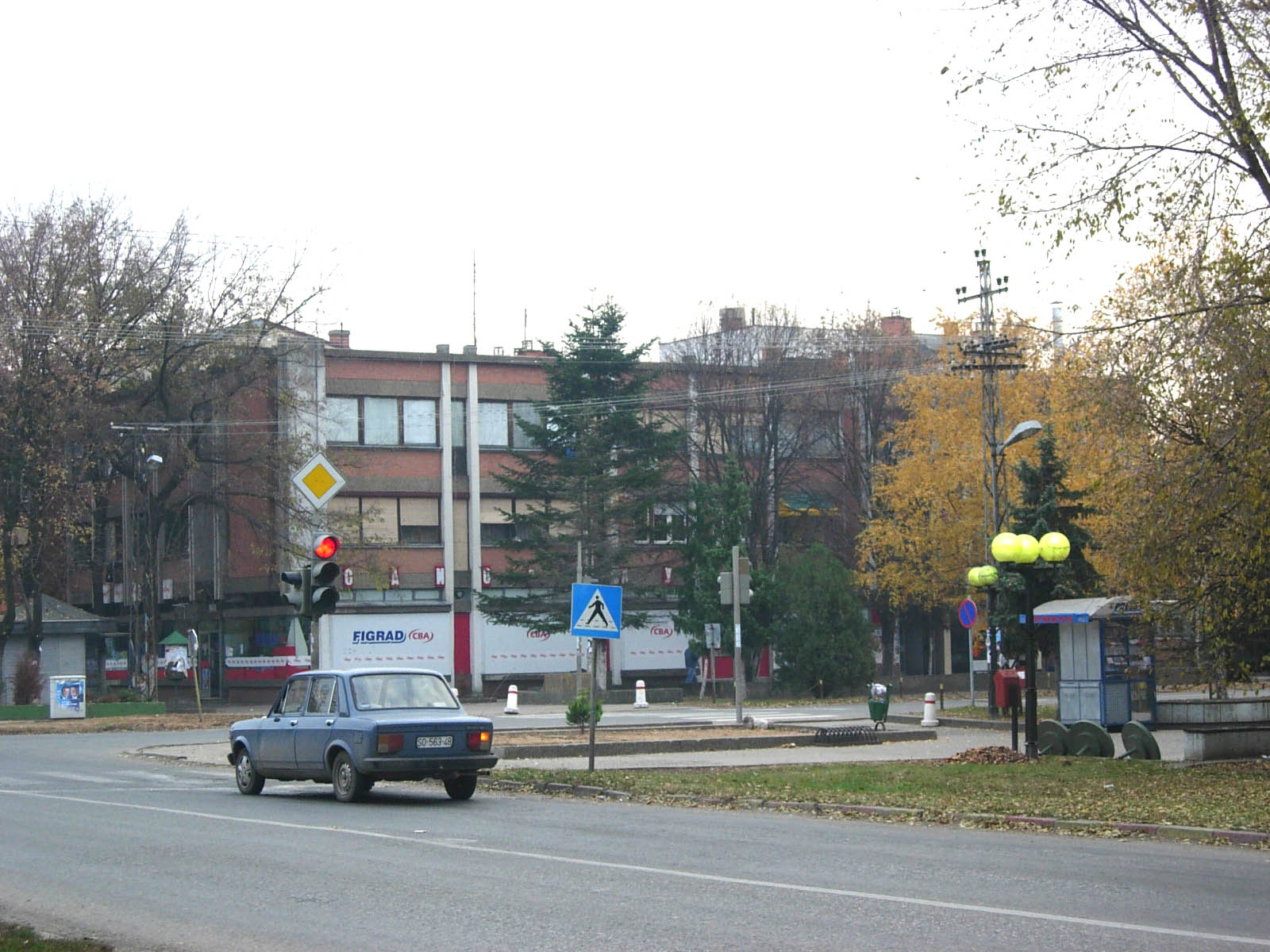
Building in the town center

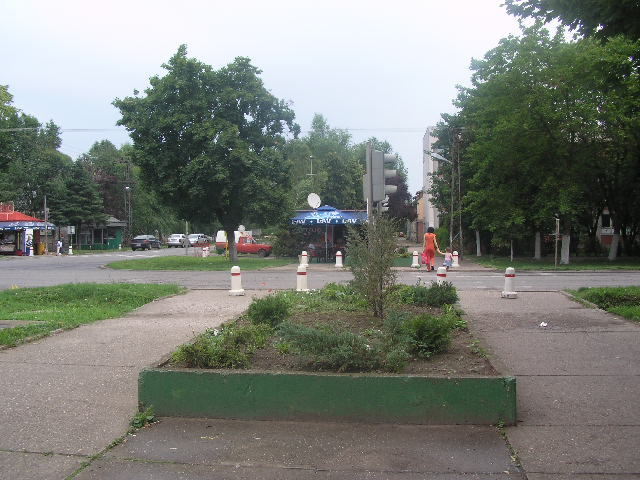
Town center

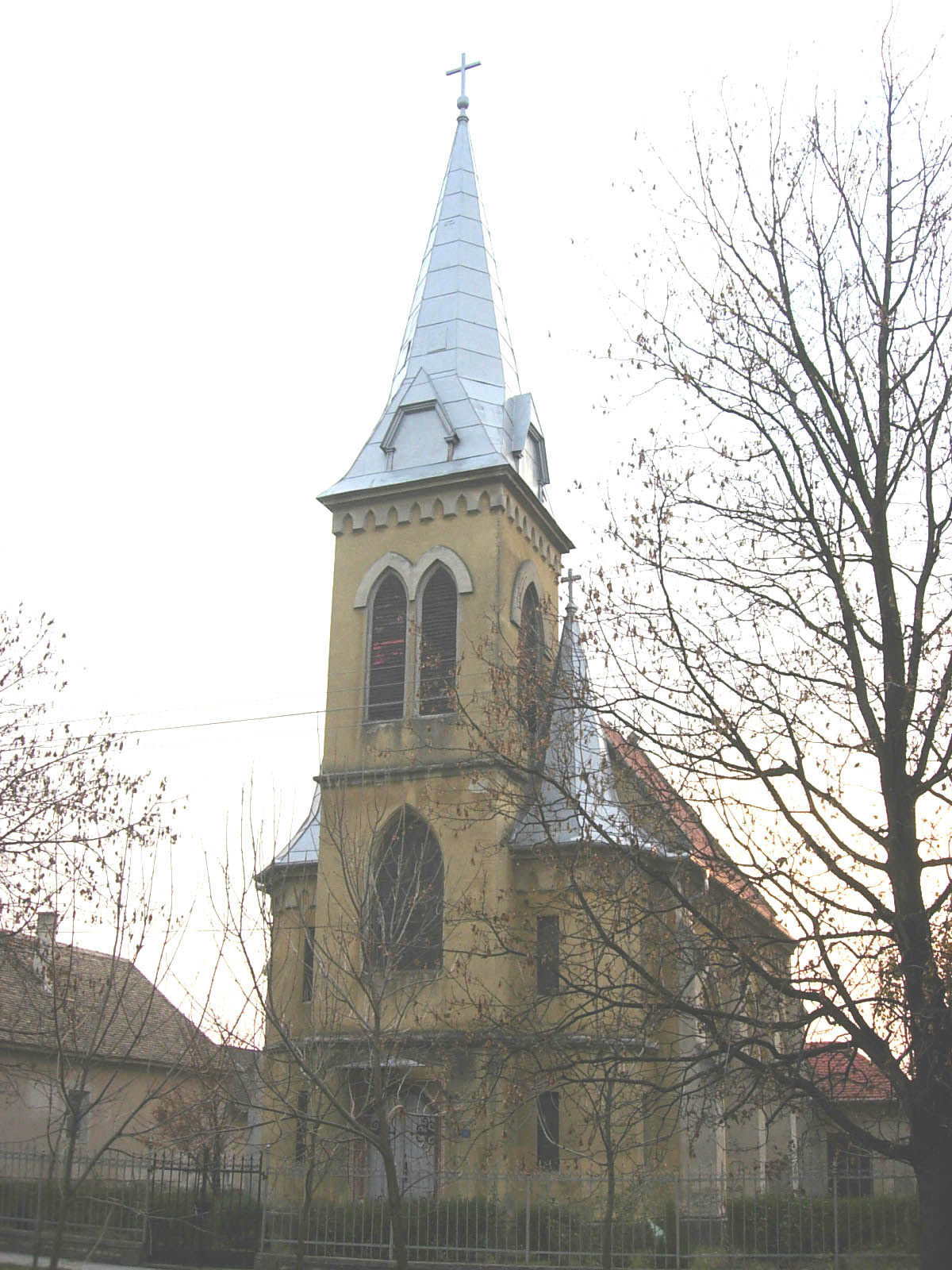
Heart of Jesus Catholic Church

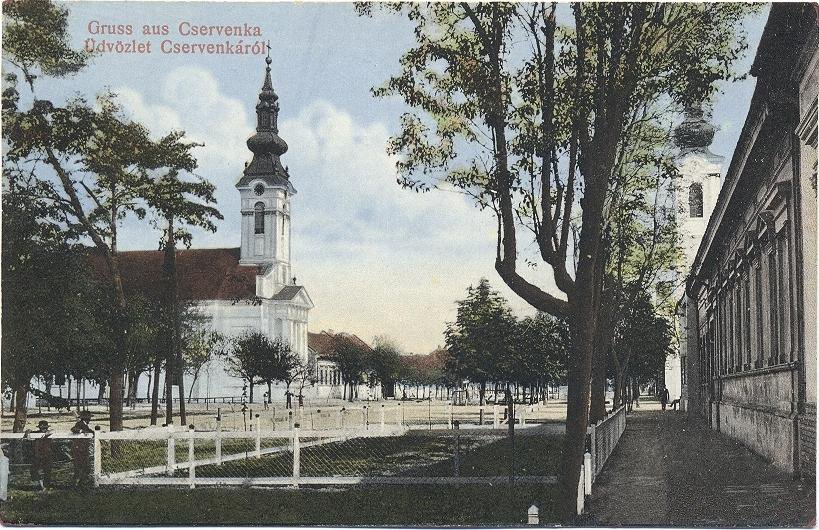
Old postcard of the town

Crvenka (Serbian Cyrillic: Црвенка) is a small town located in the municipality of Kula in the West Bačka District, Autonomous Province of Vojvodina, Serbia. The town has a Serbian ethnic majority, and it had a population of 9,001 in 2011.

== Name ==
In Serbian, the town is known as Crvenka (Црвенка), in Hungarian as Cservenka, and in German as Tscherwenka or Rotweil. The name of the town is derived from the Serbian word crveno, meaning 'red', however local historians can't agree on the definitive origin of the name. Some mention that the name originates from the fact that the locals were predominantly engaged in viticulture and wine distribution, while others believe that it got its name because of bulkas (red poppy flower) that are massively populated in the surroundings of the town.

== History ==
In prehistoric times, the region around Crvenka was covered by water because between the Danube River and Telečka Plateau there was a large lake, which was described by Roman historians as "Sweet Lake." At that time it was possible to travel by boat to the Fruška Gora mountains. In the city remains of prehistoric animals have been found, such as the mammoth. The region was most likely inhabited during the early Neolithic, when the region belonged to the Starčevo culture. Later the Celts settled in the area around Crvenka.

In the immediate vicinity, archaeological excavations have found objects from Celtic and Roman times, including urns and pottery, as well as Celtic and Roman coins. The Roman coins, known as Follis, depict Roman Emperor Constantine the Great, and some others originated from the Republic of Venice. From the middle of the 1st century to the 4th century, the region belonged to the dominion of the Iazyges, a nomadic tribe that belonged to the Sarmatians. Starting in the 5th century, Slavs settled in the region, and from the 9th century onward also Hungarians.

Crvenka was firstly mentioned in historical sources in the 16th century, during Ottoman administration. It was populated by ethnic Serbs and was part of the Sanjak of Segedin and of the Budin Eyalet. In the second half of the 17th century, this area was not populated.

At the end of the 17th century, the Bačka region was captured by the Habsburg monarchy, and in the second half of the 18th century Crvenka was mentioned as a small settlement. It was colonized by Serbs, Hungarians, and Germans. Until the middle of the 19th century, the town was part of Bács-Bodrog County within the Habsburg Kingdom of Hungary. In 1848–1849 it was part of the autonomous Serbian Vojvodina, and from 1849 to 1860 it was part of the Voivodeship of Serbia and Banat of Temeschwar, a separate Habsburg crownland. After the abolition of the voivodeship in 1860, the town was again included in Bács-Bodrog County. According to 1910 census, most of the inhabitants of the town spoke German.

After 1918, the town was part of the Kingdom of Serbs, Croats and Slovenes (later renamed Yugoslavia). In 1918–1919, it was part of the Banat, Bačka and Baranja region, and also (from 1918 to 1922) part of Novi Sad County. From 1922 to 1929, it was part of the Bačka Oblast, and from 1929 to 1941 part of the Danube Banovina.

From 1941 to 1944, Crvenka was under Axis occupation and was attached to the Horthy's Hungary. In 1944, the Soviet Red Army and Yugoslav Partisans liberated Crvenka and it was included in the autonomous province of Vojvodina within the new communist Yugoslavia. After 1945, Vojvodina was part of the People's Republic of Serbia within Yugoslavia. At the end of World War II, the ethnic German population was expelled from Crvenka, which was then populated by 4,383 people, mostly Serbs of Bosnia and Herzegovina and Montenegro. In 1948, these people comprised 63.7% of the population.

== Demographics ==
=== Ethnic groups ===
In 2002 the population of Crvenka was 10,163 people, including:

- Serbs = 7,264 (71.48%)
- Montenegrins = 1,313 (12.92%)
- Hungarians = 493 (4.85%)
- Croats = 183 (1.8%)
- Yugoslavs = 156 (1.54%)
- others (including Ukrainians, Pannonian Rusyns, Germans, Romani people, etc.)

=== Historical population ===
- 1948: 6,879
- 1953: 7,797
- 1961: 9,369
- 1971: 10,098
- 1981: 10,629
- 1991: 10,409
- 2002: 10,315
- 2011: 9,001

== Economy ==
Crvenka is a small town with a very strong economy, especially industry and agriculture.

The most important companies in Crvenka include:

- The Crvenka Sugar Factory (Crvenka Fabrika Šećera a.d. / EBZ)
- The Jaffa Biscuit Company
- The Panon AD Alcohol and Beverage Factory
- FSH Crvenka AD
- Jedinstvo IGM Crvenka
- SIGMA d.o.o
- ALTER EGO d.o.o
- DP Zaliv d.o.o.
- ZZ Novo
- BXB d.o.o
- Permak d.o.o
- KUĆA HEMIJE MARIVA d.o.o.

== Sport ==
Crvenka has a handball club named RK Crvenka. There is also a football team, FK Crvenka, with a long tradition and who even played one season in he top-tier Yugoslav First League. Crvenka has a chess club named ŠK Miljo Vujović and a karate club.

== Notable residents ==
- Milorad Vučelić former vice-president of the Socialist Party of Serbia and close associate of Slobodan Milošević.
- Ratko Svilar, former football goalkeeper who participated in the 1982 FIFA World Cup.
- Zorica Vojinović, former handball player who competed in the 1980 Summer Olympics.

== See also ==
- List of places in Serbia
- List of cities, towns and villages in Vojvodina

== Gallery ==
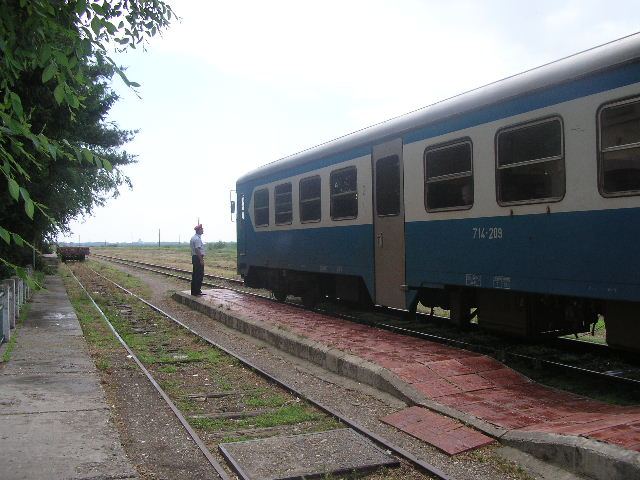
Railway

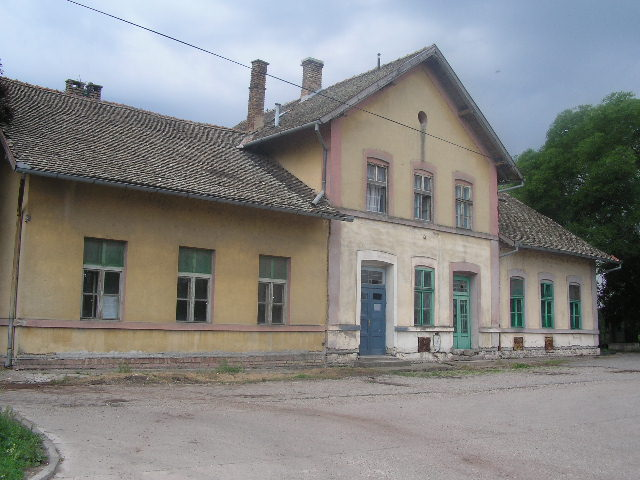
Railway Station

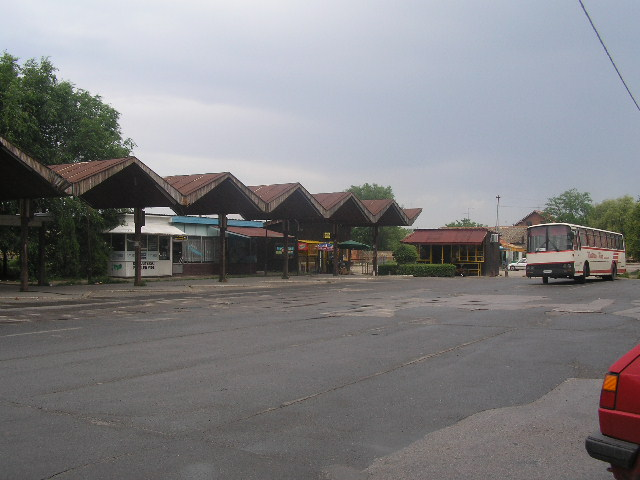
Bus Station

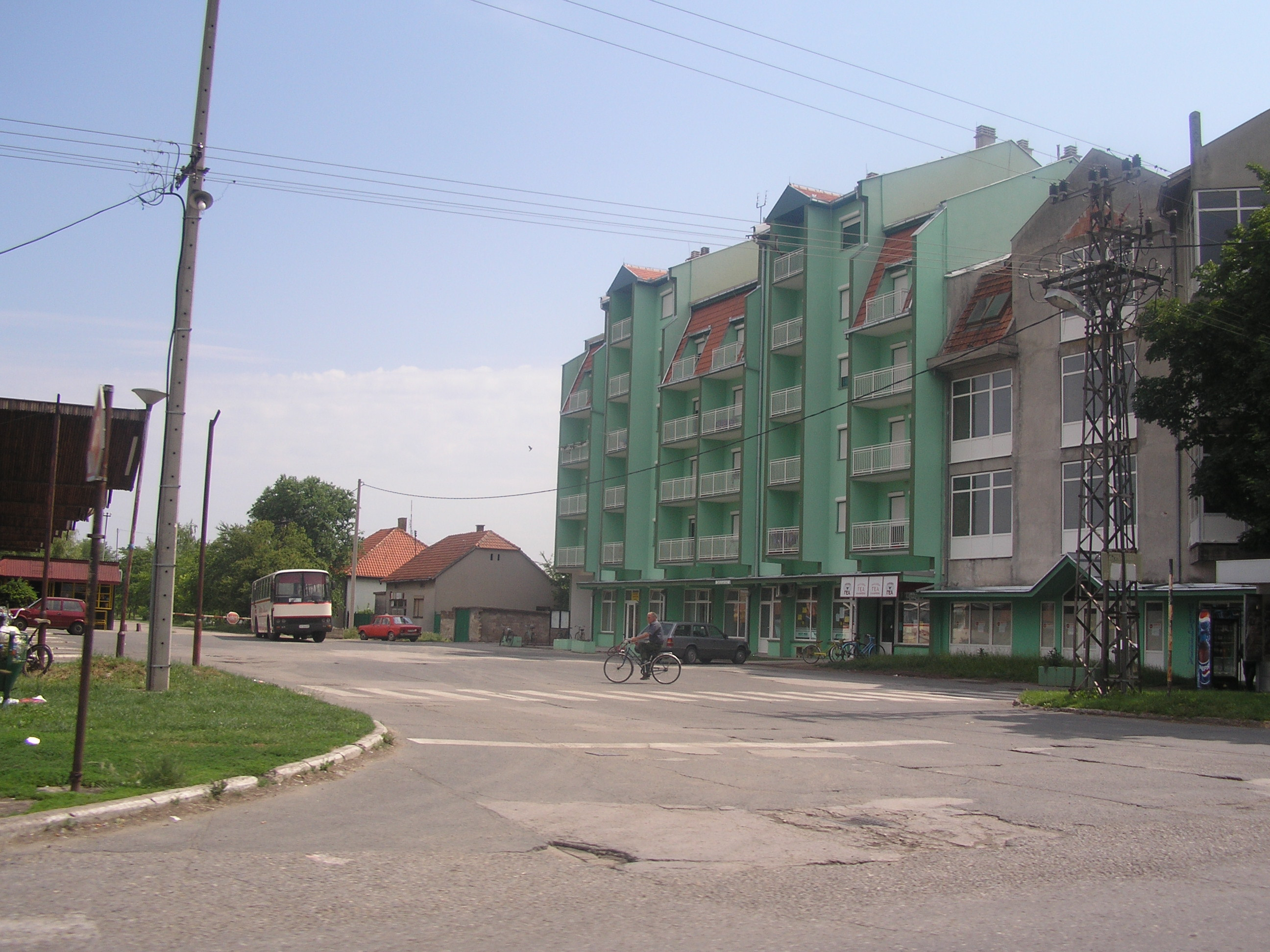
Town Center
