= Milan Grubanov =

Serbian handball player (born 1978)

Personal information
- Full name: Milan Grubanov
- Nationality: Serbian
- Born: 30 April 1978 (age 48)
- Height: 195 cm (77 in)

Sport
- Sport: Handball
- Position: Playmaker
- Current club: BM Ciudad Encantada
- Number: 17

Senior clubs
- Years: Team
- 2003-?: Djurgårdens IF,
- ?-2007: Bjerringbro-Silkeborg
- 2007-?: Viborg HK
- 2009-: PAOK

Milan Grubanov (born 30 April 1978) is a Serbian handball player, currently playing for Liga ASOBAL side BM Ciudad Encantada.

Grubanov has made several appearances for the Serbian national handball team.

Grubanov played for Proleter Naftagas, RK Toza Markovic, Djurgårdens IF, Bjerringbro-Silkeborg Håndbold, Viborg HK and PAOK.
