= Dalibor Čutura =

Serbian handball player (born 1975)

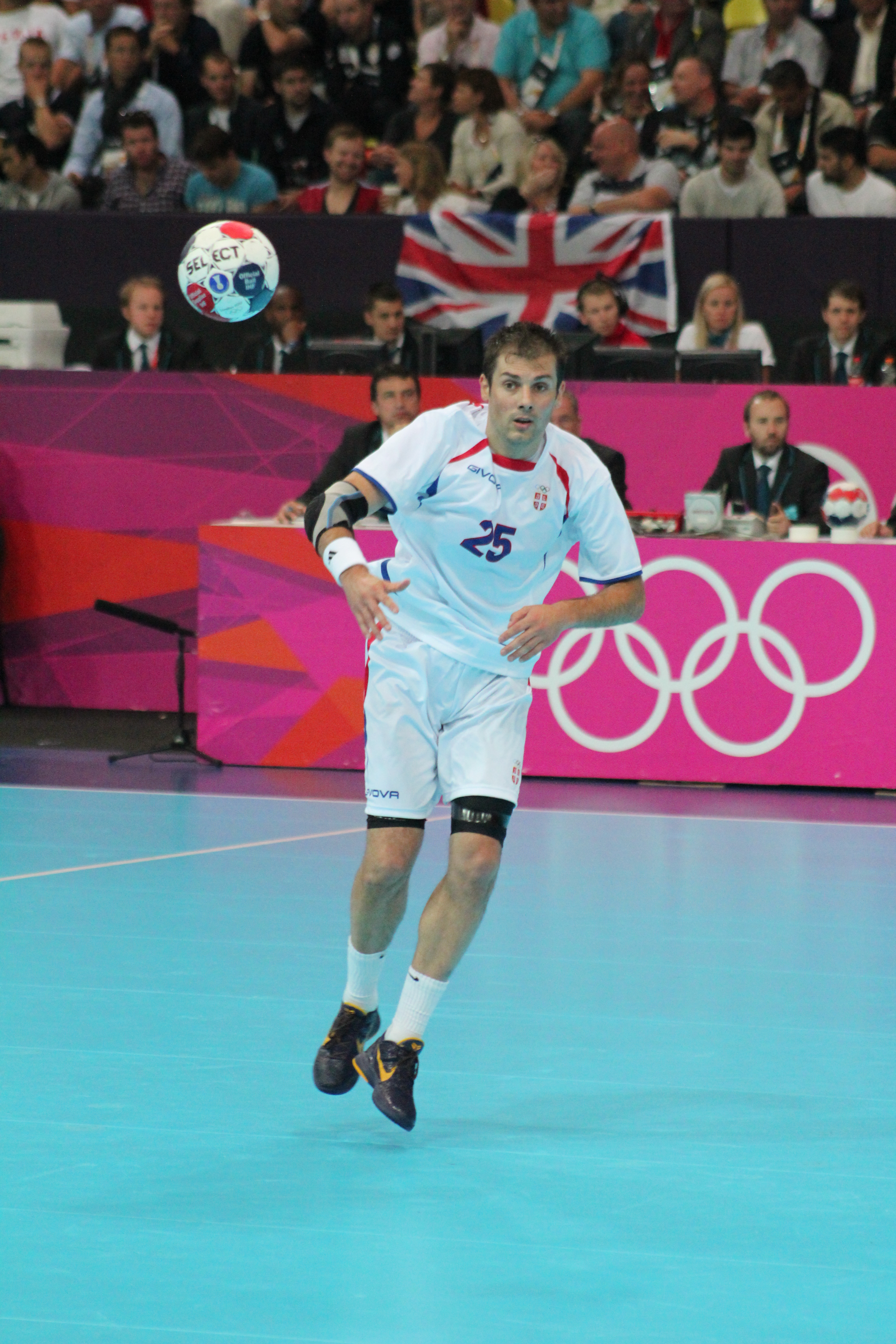
- Čutura in 2012

Personal information
- Full name: Dalibor Čutura
- Nationality: Serbian
- Born: 14 June 1975 (age 51) Sombor, SR Serbia, SFR Yugoslavia
- Height: 1.90 m (6 ft 3 in)

Sport
- Sport: Handball
- Position: Centre back
- Current club: CSM Focșani (head coach)

Youth career
- Years: Team
- –: Crvenka

Senior clubs
- Years: Team
- –: Crvenka
- –: Sintelon
- 1997–1998: Železničar Niš
- 1998–1999: Fotex Veszprém
- 1999–2001: Lovćen
- 2001–2002: Pilotes Posada
- 2002–2003: Alcobendas
- 2003–2010: Arrate
- 2010–2012: Ademar León
- 2012–2015: HCM Constanța
- 2015–2019: Dobrogea Sud Constanța
National team
- Years: Team
- 2011–2017: Serbia

Teams managed
- 2019–: CSM Focșani
Medal record
Men's handball
Representing Serbia
European Championship
Silver medal – second place	2012 Serbia	Team

Dalibor Čutura (Serbian Cyrillic: Далибор Чутура; born 14 June 1975) is a Serbian handball coach and former player.

== Club career ==
Over the course of his career that spanned more than 25 years, Čutura played for Crvenka, Sintelon, Železničar Niš (1997–1998), Fotex Veszprém (1998–1999), Lovćen (1999–2001), Pilotes Posada (2001–2002), Alcobendas (2002–2003), Arrate (2003–2010), Ademar León (2010–2012), HCM Constanța (2012–2015), and Dobrogea Sud Constanța (2015–2019).

== International career ==
At international level, Čutura represented Serbia at the 2012 European Championship, winning the silver medal. He also participated in the 2012 Summer Olympics.

== Personal life ==
Čutura is the older brother of fellow handball player Davor Čutura.

== Honours ==
Lovćen

- Handball Championship of FR Yugoslavia: 1999–2000, 2000–01

HCM Constanța

- Liga Națională: 2012–13, 2013–14
- Cupa României: 2012–13, 2013–14
- Supercupa României: 2013, 2014

Dobrogea Sud Constanța

- Cupa României: 2017–18
- Supercupa României: 2017
