= Momir Rnić (handballer, born 1987) =

Serbian handball player

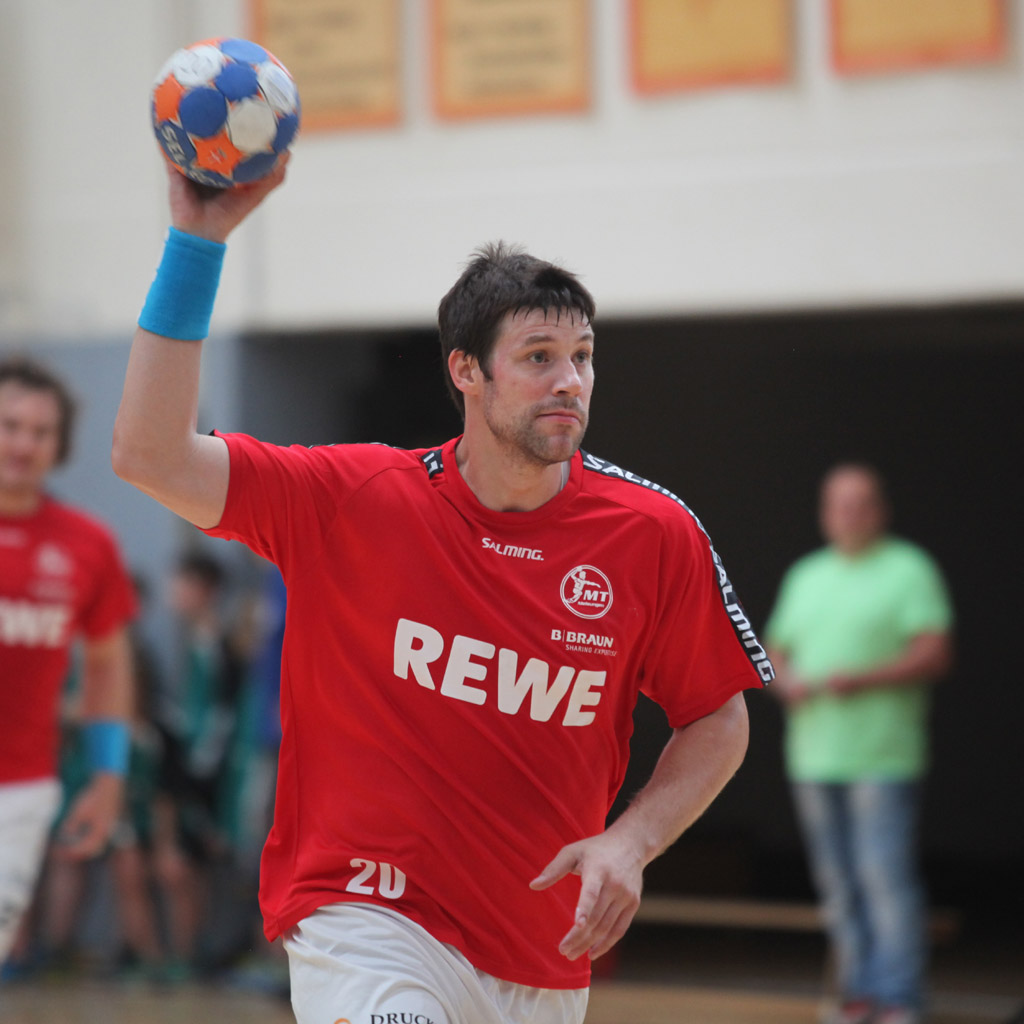
- Rnić in 2015

Personal information
- Full name: Momir Rnić
- Nationality: Serbian
- Born: 1 November 1987 (age 38) Zrenjanin, SFR Yugoslavia
- Height: 1.96 m (6 ft 5 in)

Sport
- Sport: Handball
- Position: Left back
- Current club: RK Metalurg Skopje
- Number: 42

Youth career
- Years: Team
- –: RK Proleter Zrenjanin

Senior clubs
- Years: Team
- 2004–2008: RK Proleter Zrenjanin
- 2008–2010: RK Gorenje Velenje
- 2010–2011: RK Celje
- 2011–2014: Frisch Auf Göppingen
- 2014–2017: MT Melsungen
- 2017–2018: Rhein-Neckar Löwen
- 2018–2020: RK Proleter Zrenjanin
- 2020–2021: RK Metalurg Skopje
- 2021–: RK Proleter Zrenjanin
National team
- Years: Team
- 2009–2018: Serbia
Medal record
Men's handball
Representing Serbia and Montenegro
U19 World Championship
Gold medal – first place	2005 Qatar	Team
U18 European Championship
Gold medal – first place	2004 Serbia and Montenegro	Team
Representing Serbia
European Championship
Silver medal – second place	2012 Serbia	Team
Mediterranean Games
Gold medal – first place	2009 Pescara	Team

Momir Rnić (Serbian Cyrillic: Момир Рнић; born 1 November 1987) is a Serbian handball player who plays for RK Metalurg Skopje and the Serbia national team.

== Club career ==
Rnić started out at his hometown club Proleter Zrenjanin. He was promoted to the senior squad in the 2004–05 season. In 2008, Rnić moved abroad to Slovenia and signed with Gorenje Velenje. He helped them win the championship title in his debut year. In 2010, Rnić was transferred to fellow Slovenian team Celje.

== International career ==
=== Youth ===
At youth level, Rnić was a member of the Serbia and Montenegro winning squad at the 2004 European Under-18 Championship. He subsequently helped his nation win the gold medal at the 2005 World Under-19 Championship.

=== Senior ===
A full Serbia international since 2009, Rnić made his major debut for the national team at the 2011 World Championship. He was also a member of the squad that finished as runners-up at the 2012 European Championship. Subsequently, Rnić was selected to compete at the 2012 Summer Olympics.

== Personal life ==
Rnić is the son of fellow handball player Momir Rnić.

== Honours ==
Gorenje Velenje

- Slovenian First League: 2008–09
- Slovenian Supercup: 2009

Celje

- Slovenian Supercup: 2010

Rhein-Neckar Löwen

- DHB-Pokal: 2017–18
- DHB-Supercup: 2017
