= RK Proleter Zrenjanin =

Serbian handball club

- Full name: Rukometni klub Proleter Zrenjanin
- Founded: 1949
- Arena: Crystal Hall
- Capacity: 3,000
- President: Dragan Božjak
- Head coach: Gorjan Spahic
- League: Serbian Handball Super League
- 2019–20: Annulled due to the COVID-19 pandemic
- Club colours
Home	Away

RK Proleter Zrenjanin (Serbian Cyrillic: РК Пролетер Зрењанин) is a Serbian handball club based in Zrenjanin. They compete in the Serbian Handball Super League.

== History ==
The club was founded in 1949. They won their first Yugoslav Handball Championship title in the 1989–90 season. The club subsequently finished as runners-up in the 1990–91 European Cup, losing in the final to Barcelona 41–40 on aggregate. In the 1991–92 season, they would go on to win the last edition of the Yugoslav Handball Championship.

== Honours ==
Yugoslav League

- 1989–90, 1991–92

== Sponsorship ==
During its history, the club has been known by a variety of names due to sponsorship reasons:

- Proleter Naftagas
- Proleter Agroživ (2011–2013)

== Team ==
=== Current squad ===
Squad for the 2025–26 season

Goalkeepers
Left Wingers
Right Wingers
Line players

Left Backs
Central Backs
Right Backs

- (Serbia) Lazar Ristić

=== Transfers ===
Transfers for the 2025–26 season

Joining

- (Serbia) Lazar Ristić (RB) from (Slovakia) HC Záhoráci

Leaving

- (Serbia) Stefan Ćorović (GK) to (Serbia) RK Crvena zvezda

== Notable players ==
The list includes players who played for their respective national teams in any major international tournaments, such as the Olympic Games, World Championships and European Championships:

- (Hungary) (Serbia) Uroš Vilovski
- (North Macedonia) Šandor Hodik
- (Serbia) Slaviša Đukanović
- (Serbia) Uroš Elezović
- (Serbia) Momir Rnić Jr.
- (Serbia and Montenegro) Nikola Adžić
- (Serbia and Montenegro) Goran Arsenić
- (Serbia and Montenegro) Duško Grbić
- (Serbia and Montenegro) Nebojša Jokić
- (Serbia and Montenegro) Blažo Lisičić
- (Serbia and Montenegro) Dane Šijan
- (Serbia and Montenegro) Rastko Stefanović
- (Socialist Federal Republic of Yugoslavia) Jovica Elezović
- (Socialist Federal Republic of Yugoslavia) Momir Rnić Sr.
- (Socialist Federal Republic of Yugoslavia) Ermin Velić

== Head coaches ==
- (Socialist Federal Republic of Yugoslavia) Ivan Grubački
- (Socialist Federal Republic of Yugoslavia) Slobodan Mišković
- (Socialist Federal Republic of Yugoslavia) Momir Rnić Sr.
- (Serbia and Montenegro) Slobodan Mišković
- (Serbia and Montenegro) Momir Rnić Sr.
- (Serbia and Montenegro) Dragiša Aleksić
- (Serbia and Montenegro) Vojislav Malešević
- (Serbia and Montenegro) Mirko Vasiljević
- (Serbia and Montenegro) Momir Rnić Sr.
- (Serbia and Montenegro) Branko Maljković
- (Serbia and Montenegro) Dragiša Aleksić
- (Serbia and Montenegro) Branislav Zeljković
- (Serbia and Montenegro) Darko Jevtić
- (Serbia) Nebojša Jokić
- (Serbia) Momir Rnić Sr.
- (Serbia) Vladimir Kovačević (2010–2011)
- (Serbia) Momir Rnić Sr. (2011–2012)
- (Serbia) Nebojša Jokić (2012–2013)
- (Serbia) Vladimir Kovačević (2013–2014)
- (Serbia) Milan Grubanov (2014–2015)
- (Serbia) Momir Rnić Sr. (2016–2017)
- (Serbia) Zoltan Ivanica (2018)
- (Serbia) Nebojša Jokić (2018–2019)
- (Serbia) Ljubomir Obradović (2019–2020)
- (Serbia) Momir Rnić Sr. (2020–present)
