= Jaffa Crvenka =

Serbian food company

- Native name: Јафа Црвенка; Jafa Crvenka
- Company type: d.o.o.
- Industry: Confectionery production
- Founded: 31 December 1989; 36 years ago (Current form); 1975; 51 years ago (Founded)
- Headquarters: Crvenka, Serbia
- Key people: Bojan Knežević (Director)
- Products: Confectionery
- Revenue: ▲€46.26 million (2018)
- Net income: ▼€4.46 million (2018)
- Total assets: ▼€43.58 million (2018)
- Total equity: ▲€25.30 million (2018)
- Number of employees: 713 (2018)
- Parent: Kappa Star Limited (100%)
- Website: www.jaffa.rs

Jaffa Crvenka is a Serbian food company specialized in confectionery products and headquartered in Crvenka, Serbia. Its best-known product is Jaffa Cakes, based on the original McVitie's cakes and sharing the same name.

== History ==
Jaffa was established in 1975, upon the initiative of several entrepreneurs from the area of Crvenka. The following year, in 1976, production of Jaffa Cakes biscuits commenced, having acquired the license from McVitie's. In 1978, "Jaffa" biscuits as brand were legally protected in SFR Yugoslavia. Later, in 1981, a new product named Munchmallow was introduced, which consists of an egg white cream filling on a thin biscuit, covered in a chocolate layer.

From 2004 onward, Jaffa began expanding its assortment of products, starting with the O'cake wholegrain biscuits, introducing new flavors of Jaffa Cakes and Munchmallow and, later in 2006, introducing Domaći keks ("Homemade biscuits") teacakes. In 2007, Jaffa introduced its own versions of the Petit Beurre and Polo biscuits. In 2008, Jaffa entered the salty snacks market with the introduction of the Tak brand, consisting of crunchy salty crackers, and the same year they introduced their own brand of Neapolitan wafers – Napolitanka. As of 2013, annual production of the company is 12,000 tonnes of confectionery products.

In 2017, Jaffa acquired the confectionery company Banini Kikinda for €15 million, after Banini had been ordered to sell its factory in Kikinda as to repay its debt to creditors.

== See also ==
- List of companies of the Socialist Federal Republic of Yugoslavia
