= Ivan Lapčević =

Serbian handball player (born 1976)

Personal information
- Full name: Ivan Lapčević
- Nationality: Serbian
- Born: 26 March 1976 (age 50) Aleksandrovac, SR Serbia, SFR Yugoslavia
- Height: 2.01 m (6 ft 7 in)

Sport
- Sport: Handball
- Position: Left back

Youth career
- Years: Team
- –: Župa Aleksandrovac

Senior clubs
- Years: Team
- –1996: Župa Aleksandrovac
- 1996–2001: Železničar Niš
- 2001–2002: Barcelona
- 2002–2005: VfL Gummersbach
- 2005–2010: MKB Veszprém
- 2010: Napredak Kruševac
- 2010–2011: Puerto Sagunto
- 2011–2012: Romagna
National team
- Years: Team
- 1997–2006: Serbia and Montenegro
- 2009–2010: Serbia

Teams managed
- 2019: Požarevac
Medal record
Men's handball
Representing FR Yugoslavia
World Championship
| Bronze medal – third place | 1999 Egypt | Team |
| Bronze medal – third place | 2001 France | Team |

Ivan Lapčević (Serbian Cyrillic: Иван Лапчевић; born 26 March 1976) is a Serbian handball coach and former player.

== Club career ==
After starting out at his hometown club Župa Aleksandrovac, Lapčević went on to play for Železničar Niš (1996–2001), Barcelona (2001–2002), VfL Gummersbach (2002–2005), MKB Veszprém (2005–2010), Napredak Kruševac (2010), Puerto Sagunto (2010–2011) and Romagna (2011–2012).

== International career ==
At international level, Lapčević represented Serbia and Montenegro (known as FR Yugoslavia until 2003) in six major tournaments, winning two bronze medals at the World Championships (1999 and 2001). He also participated in the 2000 Summer Olympics.

== Coaching career ==
In February 2019, Lapčević took charge at Serbian Handball Super B League team Požarevac.

== Honours ==
Železničar Niš

- Handball Cup of FR Yugoslavia: 1996–97, 1998–99

Barcelona

- Copa ASOBAL: 2001–02

MKB Veszprém

- Nemzeti Bajnokság I: 2005–06, 2007–08, 2008–09, 2009–10
- Magyar Kupa: 2006–07, 2008–09, 2009–10
- EHF Cup Winners' Cup: 2007–08
