= 1990–91 European Cup (handball) =

European men's club handball tournament

European Cup
- 1990–91

Tournament information
- Sport: Handball
- Dates: 28 September 1990–15 May 1991
- Administrator: IHF
- Participants: 28

Final positions
- Champions: (Spain) FC Barcelona
- Runner-up: (Socialist Federal Republic of Yugoslavia) RK Proleter Zrenjanin

The 1990–91 European Cup was the 31st edition of Europe's premier club handball tournament. SKA Minsk were the reigning champions. FC Barcelona won the tournament beating RK Proleter Zrenjanin in the final.

== Knockout stage ==
=== Round 1 ===
Team 1	Agg.	Team 2	1st leg	2nd leg
Sporting Neerpelt (Belgium)	38–45	(Netherlands) HV Sittardia	21–24	17–21
Red Boys Differdange (Luxembourg)	46–54	(Portugal) Benfica Lisboa	28–26	18–28
Hapoel Rishon LeZion (Israel)	53–63	(Turkey) ETİ Bisküvi Eskişehir	30–32	23–31
Kyndil Tórshavn (Faroe Islands)	38–62	(Iceland) FH	23–25	15–37
Dukla Prague (Czechoslovakia)	46–35	(East Germany) SC Dynamo Berlin	20–15	26–20
Stavanger IF (Norway)	47–37	(Finland) Sjundea IF	25–17	22–20
Wagner Biro Graz (Austria)	40–50	(Switzerland) Grasshoppers Zürich	20–24	20–26
Filippos Veria H.C. (Greece)	41–45	(Italy) Cividin Trieste	23–18	18–27
Raba ETO Györ (Hungary)	42–46	(Romania) Steaua București	21–20	21–26
Pogoń Zabrze (Poland)	52–42	(Denmark) KIF Kolding	24–17	28–25

=== Round 2 ===
Team 1	Agg.	Team 2	1st leg	2nd leg
HV Sittardia (Netherlands)	35–76	(Spain) FC Barcelona	18–43	17–33
Benfica Lisboa (Portugal)	46–52	(France) USAM Nîmes	23–21	23–31
FH (Iceland)	50–54	(Turkey) ETİ Bisküvi Eskişehir	29–21	21–33
TV Großwallstadt (Germany)	56–55	(Czechoslovakia) Dukla Prague	24–23	32–32
HK Drott Halmstad (Sweden)	46–42	(Norway) Stavanger IF	24–18	22–24
Dynamo Astrakhan (Soviet Union)	51–49	(Switzerland) Grasshoppers Zürich	25–23	26–26
Cividin Trieste (Italy)	45–49	(Romania) Steaua București	22–26	23–23
Proleter Zrenjanin (Socialist Federal Republic of Yugoslavia)	41–31	(Poland) Pogoń Zabrze	26–15	15–16

=== Quarterfinals ===
Team 1	Agg.	Team 2	1st leg	2nd leg
FC Barcelona (Spain)	41–32	(France) USAM Nîmes	23–16	18–16
TV Großwallstadt (Germany)	46–47	(Turkey) ETİ Bisküvi Eskişehir	27–20	19–27
HK Drott Halmstad (Sweden)	40–59	(Soviet Union) Dynamo Astrakhan	24–29	16–30
Steaua București (Romania)	36–49	(Socialist Federal Republic of Yugoslavia) Proleter Zrenjanin	22–20	14–29

=== Semifinals ===
Team 1	Agg.	Team 2	1st leg	2nd leg
ETİ Bisküvi Eskişehir (Turkey)	35–71	(Spain) FC Barcelona	19–31	16–40
Dynamo Astrakhan (Soviet Union)	36–38	(Socialist Federal Republic of Yugoslavia) Proleter Zrenjanin	19–18	17–20

=== Finals ===
Team 1	Agg.	Team 2	1st leg	2nd leg
Proleter Zrenjanin (Socialist Federal Republic of Yugoslavia)	40–41	(Spain) FC Barcelona	23–21	17–20
