= Dragan Mladenović (handballer, born 1956) =

Serbian handball player

Personal information
- Full name: Dragan Mladenović
- Nationality: Serbian
- Born: 29 March 1956 (age 70) Pirot, FPR Yugoslavia
- Height: 1.90 m (6 ft 3 in)

Sport
- Sport: Handball
- Position: Left back

Youth career
- Years: Team
- –: ORK Pirot

Senior clubs
- Years: Team
- –: Železničar Niš
- 1986–1988: Teka Cantabria
National team
Years	Team	Apps	(Gls)
–	Yugoslavia	61	(104)
Medal record
Men's handball
Representing Yugoslavia
Olympic Games
Gold medal – first place	1984 Los Angeles	Team
World Championship
Gold medal – first place	1986 Switzerland	Team
Mediterranean Games
Gold medal – first place	1983 Casablanca	Team

Dragan Mladenović (Serbian Cyrillic: Драган Младеновић; born 29 March 1956) is a Serbian former handball player who competed for Yugoslavia in the 1984 Summer Olympics.

== Club career ==
Born in Pirot, Mladenović spent most of his career at Železničar Niš, winning two Yugoslav Cups (1981–82 and 1984–85). He also played abroad in Spain, spending two seasons with Teka Cantabria (1986–1988).

== International career ==
At international level, Mladenović competed for Yugoslavia at the 1984 Summer Olympics, winning the gold medal. He was also a member of the team that won the 1986 World Championship.

== Honours ==
Železničar Niš

- Yugoslav Handball Cup: 1981–82, 1984–85
