= Ivan Gajić =

Serbian handball player (born 1979)

Personal information
- Full name: Ivan Gajić
- Nationality: Serbian
- Born: 17 May 1979 (age 47) Niš, SFR Yugoslavia
- Height: 1.91 m (6 ft 3 in)

Sport
- Sport: Handball
- Position: Goalkeeper

Youth career
- Years: Team
- –: Železničar Niš

Senior clubs
- Years: Team
- 1997–2005: Železničar Niš
- 2005–2006: TSV Hannover-Burgdorf
- 2006: Železničar Niš
- 2006: Frisch Auf Göppingen
- 2007: ORK Niš
- 2007–2008: Bjerringbro-Silkeborg
- 2008–2013: Gorenje Velenje
- 2013–2014: Tremblay
- 2014: Al Ahli Doha
- 2015–2017: Celje
National team
- Years: Team
- –: Serbia and Montenegro
- 2007–2013: Serbia

Ivan Gajić (Serbian Cyrillic: Иван Гајић; born 17 May 1979) is a Serbian former handball player.

== Club career ==
Over the course of his career that lasted for two decades, Gajić played for Železničar Niš (1997–2005 and 2006), TSV Hannover-Burgdorf (2005–2006), Frisch Auf Göppingen (December 2006), ORK Niš (2007), Bjerringbro-Silkeborg (2007–2008), Gorenje Velenje (2008–2013), Tremblay (2013–2014), Al Ahli Doha (2014), and Celje (2015–2017).

== International career ==
At international level, Gajić represented Serbia at the 2013 World Championship. He was previously capped for Serbia and Montenegro.

== Honours ==
Gorenje Velenje

- Slovenian First League: 2008–09, 2011–12, 2012–13

Celje

- Slovenian First League: 2015–16, 2016–17
- Slovenian Cup: 2015–16, 2016–17
