= Rokci (Ivanjica) =

Rokci Рокци
- Village
- Location within Serbia
- Coordinates: 43°31′59″N 20°12′26″E
- Country: Serbia
- District: Moravica District
- Municipality: Ivanjica

Area
  - Total: 23.91 km^{2} (9.23 sq mi)

Population (2011)
  - Total: 403
  - Density: 16.9/km^{2} (43.7/sq mi)
- Time zone: UTC+1 (CET)
  - Summer (DST): UTC+2 (CEST)

Rokci is a village in the municipality of Ivanjica, Serbia. According to the 2011 census, the village has a population of 403 inhabitants.
