= Aleksandrovac =

Aleksandrovac Александровац (Serbian)
- Town and municipality
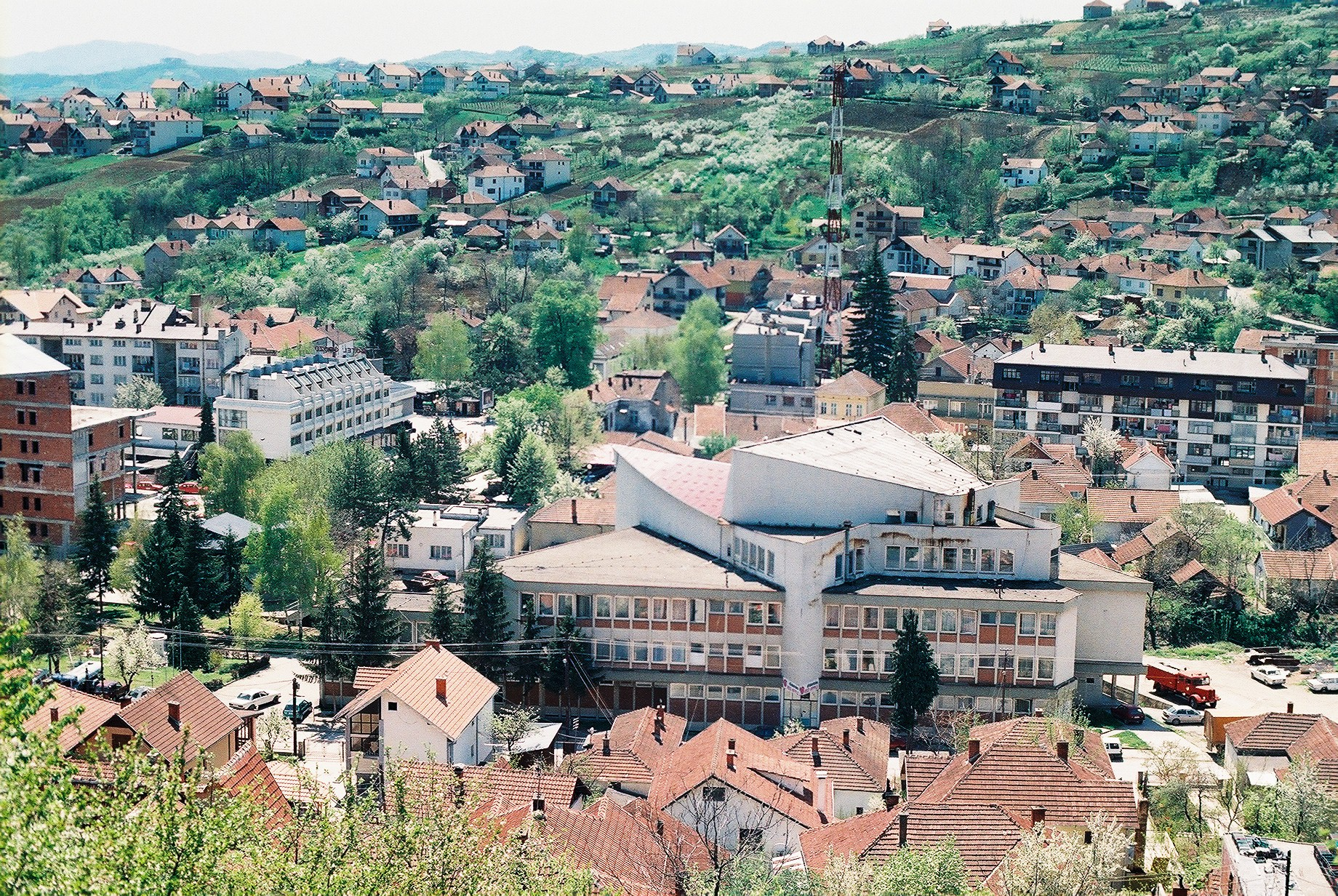
- View on the city of Aleksandrovac

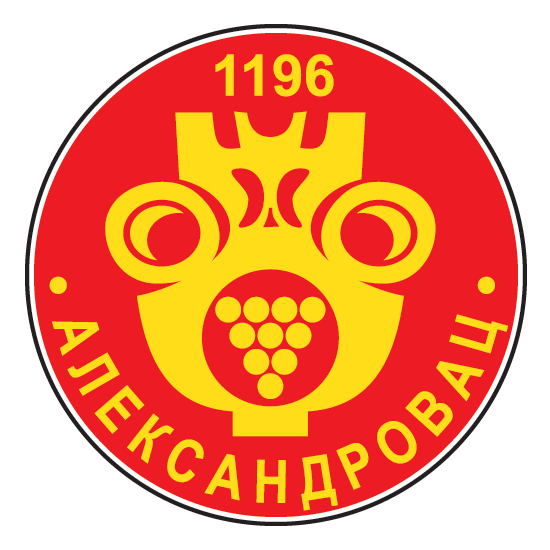
- Coat of arms

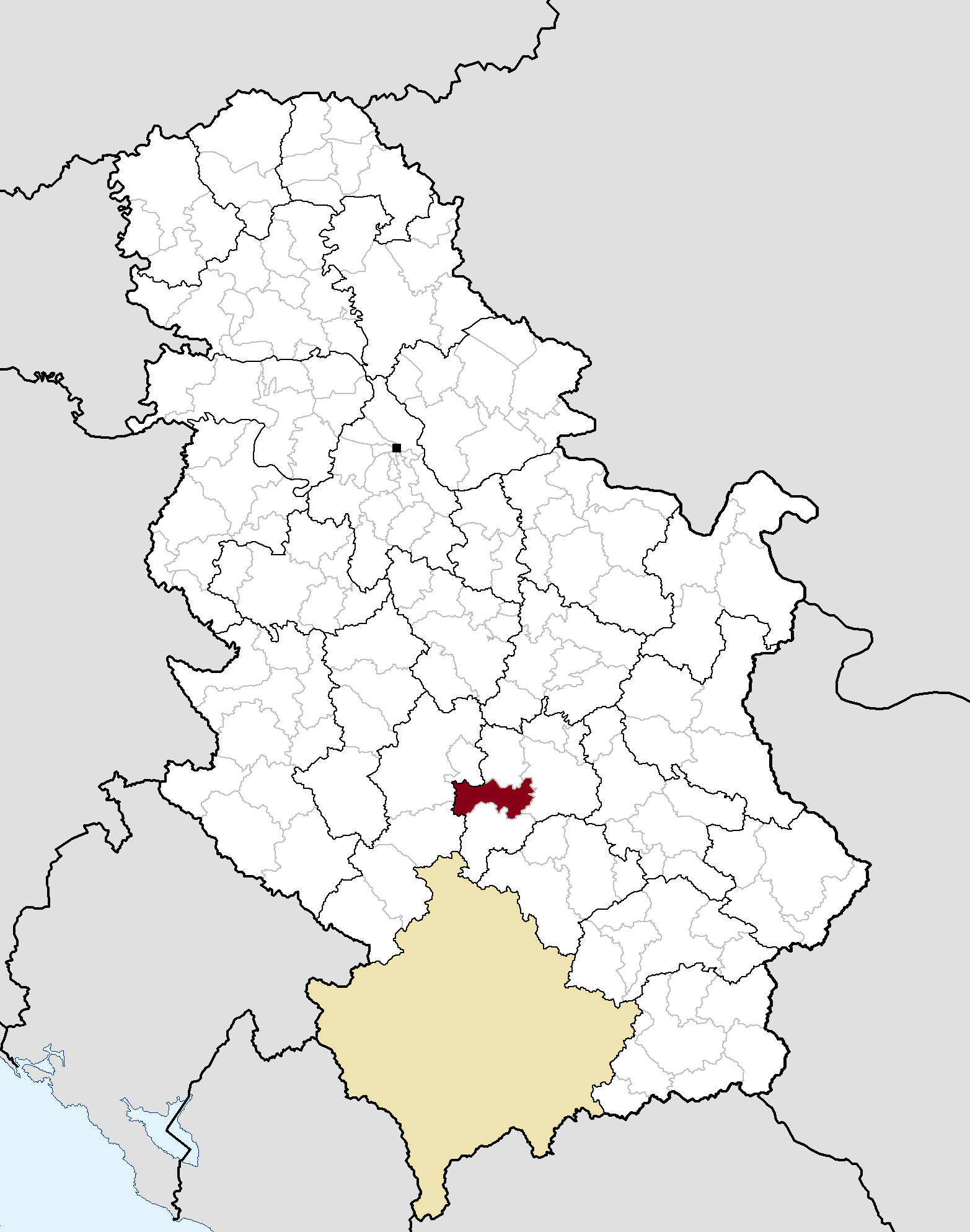
- Location of the municipality of Aleksandrovac within Serbia
- Coordinates: 43°27′32″N 21°02′47″E
- Country: Serbia
- Region: Šumadija and Western Serbia
- District: Rasina
- Settlements: 55

Government
  - Mayor: Jelena Paunović (SNS)

Area
  - Town: 3.85 km^{2} (1.49 sq mi)
  - Municipality: 387 km^{2} (149 sq mi)
- Elevation: 366 m (1,201 ft)

Population (2022 census)
  - Town: 5,586
  - Town density: 1,450/km^{2} (3,760/sq mi)
  - Municipality: 22,069
  - Municipality density: 57.0/km^{2} (148/sq mi)
- Time zone: UTC+1 (CET)
  - Summer (DST): UTC+2 (CEST)
- Postal code: 37230
- Area code: +381(0)37
- Car plates: AC
- Official languages: Serbian
- Website: www.aleksandrovac.rs

Aleksandrovac (Serbian Cyrillic: Александровац) is a town and municipality located in the Rasina District of central Serbia. As of 2022, the town has a population of 5,586 inhabitants, while the municipality has 22,069 inhabitants.

== History ==
From 1929 to 1941, Aleksandrovac was part of the Morava Banovina of the Kingdom of Yugoslavia.

== Demographics ==
Historical population
Year	Pop.	±% p.a.
1948	32,612	—
1953	34,748	+1.28%
1961	34,540	−0.08%
1971	33,798	−0.22%
1981	33,887	+0.03%
1991	33,215	−0.20%
2002	29,389	−1.11%
2011	26,522	−1.13%
2022	22,069	−1.66%

According to the 2011 census results, the municipality of Aleksandrovac had a population of 26,522 inhabitants.

=== Ethnic groups ===
The ethnic composition of the municipality:

Ethnic group	Population	%
Serbs	25,682	96.83%
Romani	84	0.32%
Montenegrins	23	0.09%
Macedonians	10	0.04%
Croats	8	0.03%
Bulgarians	7	0.03%
Yugoslavs	6	0.02%
Albanians	5	0.02%
Others	303	1.14%
Total	26,522	

== Society and culture ==
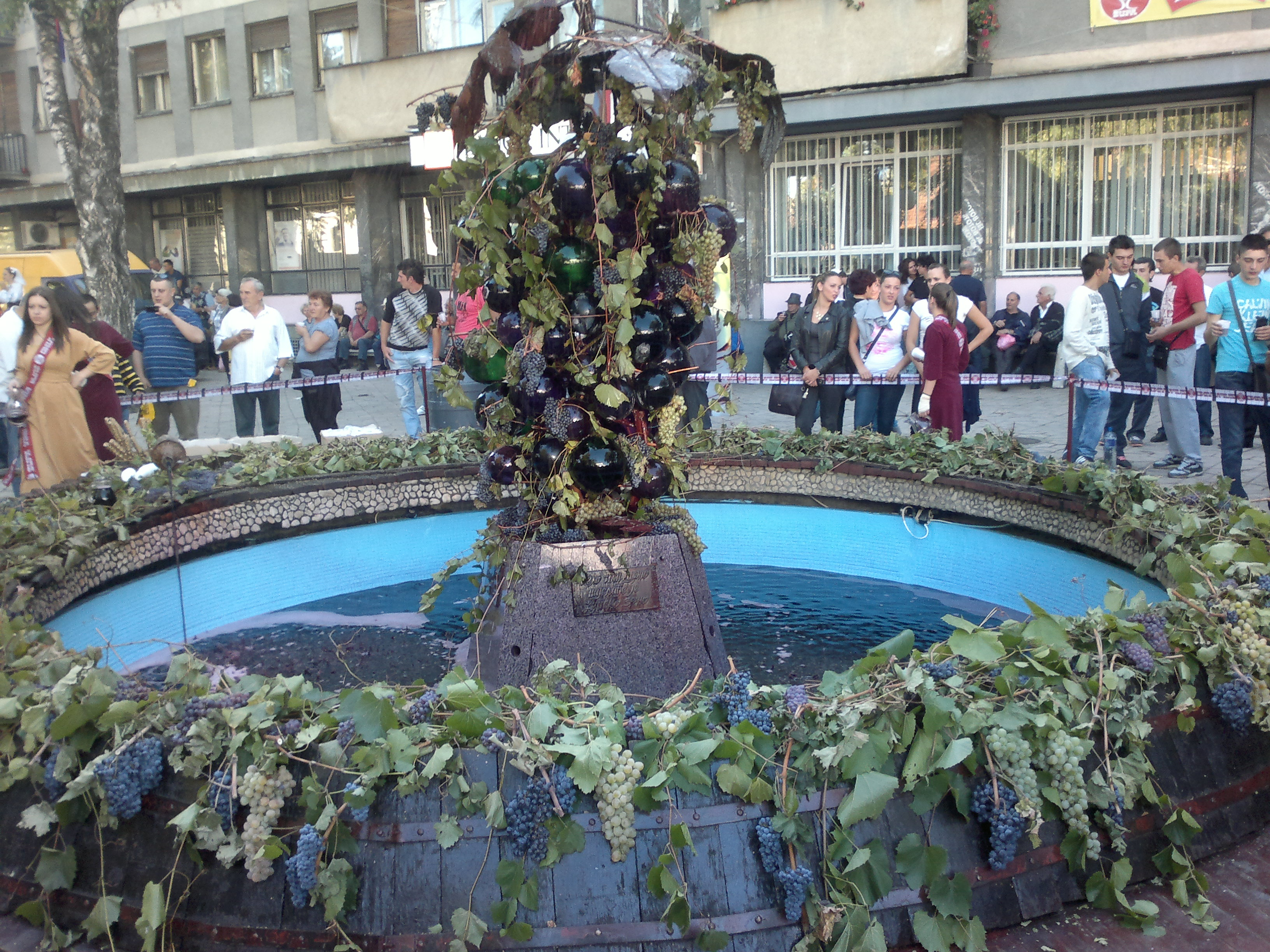
Fountain of vine

The most popular event is Župska berba, which is held annually from 22 September to 25 September. Aleksandrovac is the headquarters of one of the most successful Yugoslav record labels of all time Diskos.

The town has several sports teams among which the most popular are the basketball, volleyball and handball teams that play in the top division in Serbia. Also, it is home to FK Župa Aleksandrovac football team.

== Economy ==
The following table gives a preview of the total number of registered people employed in legal entities per their core activity (as of 2018):

Activity	Total
Agriculture, forestry and fishing	85
Mining and quarrying	2
Manufacturing	2,272
Electricity, gas, steam and air conditioning supply	27
Water supply; sewerage, waste management and remediation activities	111
Construction	309
Wholesale and retail trade, repair of motor vehicles and motorcycles	755
Transportation and storage	171
Accommodation and food services	211
Information and communication	42
Financial and insurance activities	37
Real estate activities	1
Professional, scientific and technical activities	151
Administrative and support service activities	16
Public administration and defense; compulsory social security	261
Education	494
Human health and social work activities	180
Arts, entertainment and recreation	82
Other service activities	125
Individual agricultural workers	1,101
Total	6,433

== Notable people ==
- Dimitri Davidovic, former footballer
- Danijel Gašić, footballer
- Ivan Lapcevic, handball player
- Ivan Tomić, musician
