= Handball at the 1976 Summer Olympics – Men's tournament =

Handball at the Olympics

1976 Men's Olympic handball tournament
Tournament details
- Host country: Canada
- Venues: 4 (in 3 host cities)
- Dates: 18–28 July 1976
- Teams: 12

Final positions
- Champions: Soviet Union (1st title)
- Runners-up: Romania
- Third place: Poland
- Fourth place: West Germany

Tournament statistics
- Matches played: 30
- Goals scored: 1,215 (40.5 per match)
- Top scorers: (Romania) Ștefan Birtalan (Denmark) Bent Larsen (32 goals)

The men's tournament was one of two handball tournaments at the 1976 Summer Olympics. It was the third appearance of a men's handball tournament as a medal event at the Olympic Games, after 1936 and 1972 (a demonstration event was held in 1952).

== Qualification ==
Mean of qualification	Date	Host	Berths	Qualified
Host nation	12 May 1970	(Netherlands) Amsterdam	1	Canada
1974 World Championship	28 February – 10 March 1974	East Germany	1	Romania
European qualification tournament	4 November 1975 – 7 March 1976	Various	7	Czechoslovakia; Denmark; Hungary; Poland; Soviet Union; West Germany; Yugoslavia
Asian qualification tournament	15 March – April 1976	Various	1	Japan
African qualification tournament	10–18 April 1976	(Tunisia) Tunis	1	Tunisia
American qualification tournament			1	United States
Total			12	

== Results ==
=== Preliminary round ===
==== Group A ====
Pos	Team	Pld	W	D	L	GF	GA	GD	Pts	Qualification
1	Soviet Union	5	4	0	1	111	77	+34	8	Gold medal game
2	West Germany	5	4	0	1	97	76	+21	8	Bronze medal game
3	Yugoslavia	5	4	0	1	110	93	+17	8	Fifth place game
4	Denmark	5	2	0	3	92	102	−10	4	Seventh place game
5	Japan	5	1	0	4	96	111	−15	2	Ninth place game
6	Canada (H)	5	0	0	5	75	122	−47	0	

(H) Hosts

18 July 1976; 19:00	Soviet Union	26–16	Japan	Complexe sportif Claude-Robillard, Montreal
18 July 1976; 19:00	Chernyshov 7	(11–5)	Fujinaka 6	Complexe sportif Claude-Robillard, Montreal

18 July 1976; 19:00	Yugoslavia	22–18	Canada	PEPS, Quebec City
18 July 1976; 19:00	three players 5	(15–12)	De Roussan 6	PEPS, Quebec City

18 July 1976; 19:00	West Germany	18–14	Denmark	Sherbrooke Sports Palace, Sherbrooke
18 July 1976; 19:00	Deckarm 6	(7–5)	Dahl-Nielsen 8	Sherbrooke Sports Palace, Sherbrooke

20 July 1976; 20:30	West Germany	19–16	Japan	Complexe sportif Claude-Robillard, Montreal
20 July 1976; 20:30	Ehret 5	(11–5)	Fujinaka 6	Complexe sportif Claude-Robillard, Montreal

20 July 1976; 20:30	Yugoslavia	25–17	Denmark	PEPS, Quebec City
20 July 1976; 20:30	Miljak 8	(13–5)	Larsen 9	PEPS, Quebec City

20 July 1976; 20:30	Soviet Union	25–9	Canada	Sherbrooke Sports Palace, Sherbrooke
20 July 1976; 20:30	Gassy 6	(12–5)	Ferdais 3	Sherbrooke Sports Palace, Sherbrooke

22 July 1976; 19:00	Yugoslavia	20–18	Soviet Union	Complexe sportif Claude-Robillard, Montreal
22 July 1976; 19:00	Krivokapić 8	(11–8)	Gassy 5	Complexe sportif Claude-Robillard, Montreal

22 July 1976; 19:00	West Germany	26–11	Canada	PEPS, Quebec City
22 July 1976; 19:00	Klühspies 6	(14–7)	Viens 4	PEPS, Quebec City

22 July 1976; 19:00	Denmark	21–17	Japan	Sherbrooke Sports Palace, Sherbrooke
22 July 1976; 19:00	Larsen 7	(8–11)	Kino 5	Sherbrooke Sports Palace, Sherbrooke

24 July 1976; 20:30	Denmark	24–18	Canada	Complexe sportif Claude-Robillard, Montreal
24 July 1976; 20:30	Andersen, Pazyj 6	(7–6)	Blankenau, Désormeaux 4	Complexe sportif Claude-Robillard, Montreal

24 July 1976; 20:30	West Germany	16–18	Soviet Union	PEPS, Quebec City
24 July 1976; 20:30	Larsen 7	(5–9)	Gassy 6	PEPS, Quebec City

24 July 1976; 20:30	Yugoslavia	26–22	Japan	Sherbrooke Sports Palace, Sherbrooke
24 July 1976; 20:30	Miljak 12	(13–12)	Fujinaka, Gamo 6	Sherbrooke Sports Palace, Sherbrooke

26 July 1976; 19:00	West Germany	18–17	Yugoslavia	Complexe sportif Claude-Robillard, Montreal
26 July 1976; 19:00	Ehret, Klühspies 4	(8–7)	Pavićević 10	Complexe sportif Claude-Robillard, Montreal

26 July 1976; 19:00	Japan	25–19	Canada	PEPS, Quebec City
26 July 1976; 19:00	three players 5	(9–9)	Ferdais 5	PEPS, Quebec City

26 July 1976; 19:00	Soviet Union	24–16	Denmark	Sherbrooke Sports Palace, Sherbrooke
26 July 1976; 19:00	Klimov 6	(13–7)	Larsen 6	Sherbrooke Sports Palace, Sherbrooke

==== Group B ====
Pos	Team	Pld	W	D	L	GF	GA	GD	Pts	Qualification
1	Romania	4	3	1	0	91	71	+20	7	Gold medal game
2	Poland	4	3	0	1	80	71	+9	6	Bronze medal game
3	Hungary	4	2	0	2	92	82	+10	4	Fifth place game
4	Czechoslovakia	4	1	1	2	85	82	+3	3	Seventh place game
5	United States	4	0	0	4	80	122	−42	0	Ninth place game
–	Tunisia (Note: Tunisia withdrew after 2 matches.)	0	0	0	0	0	0	0	0	Withdrawn

Notes:

18 July 1976; 20:30	Romania	23–18	Hungary	Complexe sportif Claude-Robillard, Montreal; Referees: Valčić, Stanojević (YUG)
18 July 1976; 20:30	Birtalan 6	(13–8)	Szilágyi, Vass 4	Complexe sportif Claude-Robillard, Montreal; Referees: Valčić, Stanojević (YUG)

18 July 1976; 20:30	Czechoslovakia	28–20	United States	PEPS, Quebec City
18 July 1976; 20:30	Jarý 5	(15–13)	Abrahamson 7	PEPS, Quebec City

18 July 1976; 20:30	Poland	26–12 (Annulled)	Tunisia	Sherbrooke Sports Palace, Sherbrooke

20 July 1976; 19:00	Czechoslovakia	21–9 (Annulled)	Tunisia	Complexe sportif Claude-Robillard, Montreal

20 July 1976; 19:00	Romania	32–19	United States	PEPS, Quebec City; Referees: Rodil, Ohlsen (DEN)
20 July 1976; 19:00	Birtalan 8	(16–8)	Abrahamson, Rogers 5	PEPS, Quebec City; Referees: Rodil, Ohlsen (DEN)

20 July 1976; 19:00	Poland	18–16	Hungary	Sherbrooke Sports Palace, Sherbrooke
20 July 1976; 19:00	Kałuziński 8	(7–8)	Varga 7	Sherbrooke Sports Palace, Sherbrooke

22 July 1976; 20:30	Hungary	36–21	United States	Complexe sportif Claude-Robillard, Montreal
22 July 1976; 20:30	Varga 9	(18–9)	Ra. Dean 6	Complexe sportif Claude-Robillard, Montreal

22 July 1976; 20:30	Poland	21–18	Czechoslovakia	PEPS, Quebec City
22 July 1976; 20:30	Gmyrek, Melcer 5	(8–7)	Mikeš 6	PEPS, Quebec City

24 July 1976; 19:00	Poland	26–20	United States	Complexe sportif Claude-Robillard, Montreal
24 July 1976; 19:00	Klempel, Przybysz 8	(14–10)	Rogers 8	Complexe sportif Claude-Robillard, Montreal

24 July 1976; 19:00	Romania	19–19	Czechoslovakia	Sherbrooke Sports Palace, Sherbrooke; Referees: Rodil, Ohlsen (DEN)
24 July 1976; 19:00	Birtalan 7	(13–10)	three players 4	Sherbrooke Sports Palace, Sherbrooke; Referees: Rodil, Ohlsen (DEN)

26 July 1976; 20:30	Czechoslovakia	20–22	Hungary	Complexe sportif Claude-Robillard, Montreal
26 July 1976; 20:30	Mikeš 7	(11–10)	Vass 7	Complexe sportif Claude-Robillard, Montreal

26 July 1976; 20:30	Romania	17–15	Poland	PEPS, Quebec City; Referees: Reichel, Tetens (FRG)
26 July 1976; 20:30	Birtalan 8	(8–6)	Klempel 6	PEPS, Quebec City; Referees: Reichel, Tetens (FRG)

=== Final round ===
==== Ninth place game ====
27 July 1976; 14:00	Japan	27–20	United States	Complexe sportif Claude-Robillard, Montreal
27 July 1976; 14:00	three players 5	(12–8)	Ra. Dean 6	Complexe sportif Claude-Robillard, Montreal

==== Seventh place game ====
27 July 1976; 15:30	Denmark	21–25	Czechoslovakia	Complexe sportif Claude-Robillard, Montreal
27 July 1976; 15:30	Bock, Dahl-Nielsen 4	(13–11)	three players 5	Complexe sportif Claude-Robillard, Montreal

==== Fifth place game ====
27 July 1976; 19:00	Yugoslavia	21–19	Hungary	Complexe sportif Claude-Robillard, Montreal
27 July 1976; 19:00	Serdarušić 7	(11–9)	Vass 6	Complexe sportif Claude-Robillard, Montreal

==== Bronze medal game ====
28 July 1976; 17:00	West Germany	18–21	Poland	Montreal Forum, Montreal
28 July 1976; 17:00	three players 4	(9–11)	Kałuziński, Klempel 6	Montreal Forum, Montreal

==== Gold medal game ====
28 July 1976; 18:30	Soviet Union	19–15	Romania	Montreal Forum, Montreal; Attendance: 3,000; Referees: Reichel, Tetens (FRG)
28 July 1976; 18:30	Gassy 6	(10–6)	Grabovschi, Licu 4	Montreal Forum, Montreal; Attendance: 3,000; Referees: Reichel, Tetens (FRG)

== Rankings and statistics ==
=== Final ranking ===
Rank	Team
1st place, gold medalist(s)	Soviet Union
2nd place, silver medalist(s)	Romania
3rd place, bronze medalist(s)	Poland
4	West Germany
5	Yugoslavia
6	Hungary
7	Czechoslovakia
8	Denmark
9	Japan
10	United States
11	Canada
–	Tunisia

=== Top goalscorers ===
Rank	Name	Goals
1	(Romania) Ștefan Birtalan	32
1	(Denmark) Bent Larsen	32
3	(Socialist Federal Republic of Yugoslavia) Zdravko Miljak	30
4	(West Germany) Joachim Deckarm	28
5	(Japan) Kenji Fujinaka	26
6	(Soviet Union) Valeri Gassy	25
6	(Czechoslovakia) Pavel Mikeš	25
8	(United States) Richard Abrahamson	24
8	(United States) Randy Dean	24
10	(Poland) Jerzy Klempel	23
10	(Soviet Union) Vladimir Maksimov	23

== Team rosters ==
Canada	Czechoslovakia	Denmark	Hungary	Japan	Poland
Wolfgang Blankenau; Christian Chagnon; François Dauphin; Hugues de Roussan; Pierre Désormeaux; Pierre Ferdais; Robert Johnson; Richard Lambert; Claude Lefebvre; Danny Power; Pierre St. Martin; Stan Thorseth; Luc Tousignant; Claude Viens; Coach: Eugen Trofin	Bohumil Cepák; Jozef Dobrotka; Vladimír Haber; Jiří Hanzl; Vladimír Jarý; Jiří Kavan; Jindřich Krepindl; Jiří Liška; Pavel Mikeš; Ján Packa; Jaroslav Papiernik; Ivan Satrapa; František Šulc; Coach: Jiří Vícha Štefan Katušák	Søren Andersen; Lars Bock; Anders Dahl-Nielsen; Jørgen Frandsen; Claus From; Henrik Jacobsgaard; Palle Jensen; Kay Jørgensen; Bent Larsen; Thor Munkager; Thomas Pazyj; Jesper Petersen; Johnny Piechnik; Coach: Jørgen Gaarskjær Morten Stig Christensen	Béla Bartalos (Honvéd Szondy SE); Ferenc Buday (Budapest Honvéd SE); Ernő Gubányi (TBSC); László Jánovszki (Budapest Spartacus SC); József Kenyeres (Budapest Honvéd SE); Zsolt Kontra (Honvéd Szondy SE); Péter Kovács (Budapest Honvéd SE); Mihály Süvöltős (Debreceni Dózsa); István Szilágyi (FTC); István Varga (Debreceni Dózsa); Károly Vass (Elektromos SE); Gábor Verőci (Budapest Honvéd SE); Coach: Mihály Faludi Zoltán Bartalos; Pál Kocsis	Kenji Fujinaka; Seimei Gamo; Hiroshi Hanawa; Hiroshi Honda; Toyohiko Hozumi; Satoshi Kikuchi; Minoru Kino; Kozo Matsubara; Takezo Nakai; Kenichi Sasaki; Yoji Sato; Masaki Shibata; Coach: Tomoaki Takeno	Zdzisław Antczak; Janusz Brzozowski; Piotr Cieśla; Jan Gmyrek; Alfred Kałuziński; Jerzy Klempel; Zygfryd Kuchta; Jerzy Melcer; Ryszard Przybysz; Henryk Rozmiarek; Andrzej Sokołowski; Andrzej Szymczak; Mieczysław Wojczak; Włodzimierz Zieliński; Coach: Janusz Czerwiński
Romania	Soviet Union	Tunisia	United States	West Germany	Yugoslavia
Ștefan Birtalan; Adrian Cosma; Cezar Drăgăniṭă; Alexandru Fölker; Cristian Gațu; Mircea Grabovschi; Roland Gunesch; Gabriel Kicsid; Ghiță Licu; Nicolae Munteanu; Cornel Penu; Werner Stöckl; Constantin Tudosie; Radu Voina; Coach: Nicolae Nedef	Aleksandr Anpilogov; Yevgeni Chernyshov; Anatoli Fedyukin; Valeri Gassy; Vasily Ilyin; Mykhaylo Ishchenko; Yury Kidyayev; Yury Klimov; Vladimir Kravtsov; Serhiy Kushniryuk; Yuriy Lahutyn; Vladimir Maksimov; Oleksandr Rezanov; Mykola Tomyn; Coach: Anatoli Yevtushenko	Mohamed Abdel Khaled; Khaled Achour; Habib Ammar; Ahmed Bechir Bel Hadj; Abderraouf Ben Samir; Moncef Besbes; Raouf Chabchoub; Slaheddine Deguechi; Mohamed Naceur Jelili; Mounir Jelili; Habib Kheder; Lotfi Rebai	Richard Abrahamson; Roger Baker; Peter Buehning, Jr. Randolph Dean; Robert Dean; Vincent DiCalogero; Ezra Glantz; William Johnson; Patrick O'Neill; Sandor Rivnyak; James Rogers; Kevin Serrapede; Robert Sparks; Harry Winkler; Coach: Dennis Berkholtz	Gerd Becker; Günter Böttcher; Heiner Brand; Bernhard Busch; Joachim Deckarm; Arno Ehret; Jürgen Hahn; Manfred Hofmann; Peter Jaschke; Peter Kleibrink; Kurt Klühspies; Rudolf Rauer; Horst Spengler; Walter von Oepen; Coach: Vlado Štencl	Abaz Arslanagić; Vlado Bojović; Hrvoje Horvat; Milorad Karalić; Radivoj Krivokapić; Zdravko Miljak; Željko Nimš; Radisav Pavićević; Branislav Pokrajac; Nebojša Popović; Zdravko Rađenović; Zvonimir Serdarušić; Predrag Timko; Zdenko Zorko; Coach: Ivan Snoj
