= Tunisia at the 1976 Summer Olympics =

- IOC code: TUN
- NOC: Tunisian Olympic Committee

in Montreal Canada
- Competitors: 15 in 3 sports
- Flag bearer: Mohammed Gammoudi
- Medals: Gold 0 Silver 0 Bronze 0 Total 0

Summer Olympics appearances (overview)
- 1960; 1964; 1968; 1972; 1976; 1980; 1984; 1988; 1992; 1996; 2000; 2004; 2008; 2012; 2016; 2020; 2024; 2028

During the 1976 Summer Olympics held in Montréal in Canada, the Tunisian team initially competed but then joined a boycott by all but two African nations. The boycott was called due to the International Olympic Committee (IOC) allowing the New Zealand team to participate despite the recent tour of South Africa by the country's rugby union team. Sporting contact with South Africans was banned by the IOC as a consequence of the system of apartheid operated in the country.

Athletes from Cameroon, Egypt, Morocco, and Tunisia competed during the first three days of the Games, from 18 to 20 July, before withdrawing from the Olympics, joining a total of 33 countries mainly from Africa in the boycott.

== Boxing ==
Men

Athlete	Event	1 Round	2 Round	3 Round	Quarterfinals	Semifinals	Final
Athlete	Event	Opposition Result	Opposition Result	Opposition Result	Opposition Result	Opposition Result	Rank
Fredj Chtioui	Welterweight	David Jackson (NZL); L RSC-2	Did not advance				

== Handball ==
=== Men's team competition ===
- Mohamed Abdel Khaled
- Khaled Achour
- Habib Ammar
- Ahmed Bechir Bel Hadj
- Abderraouf Ben Samir
- Moncef Besbes
- Raouf Chabchoub
- Slaheddine Deguechi
- Mohamed Naceur Jelili
- Mounir Jelili
- Habib Kheder
- Lotfi Rebai

=== Group B ===
Tunisia withdrew after 2 matches. The results were annulled.

Poland	26–12	Tunisia

Czechoslovakia	21–9	Tunisia

== Swimming ==
Men

Athlete	Event	Heat		Semifinal		Final	
Athlete	Event	Time	Rank	Time	Rank	Time	Rank
Ali Gharbi	200 metre freestyle	1:55.82	24	Did not advance			

Women

Athlete	Event	Heat		Semifinal		Final	
Athlete	Event	Time	Rank	Time	Rank	Time	Rank
Myriam Mizouni	100 metre freestyle	1:02.42	38	Did not advance			
Myriam Mizouni	400 metre freestyle	4:43.11	28	Did not advance			
