= Jozef =

Jozef (Creole, Dutch, Breton, and Slovak) or Józef (Polish) are variants of the masculine given name Joseph in several European languages. A selection of people with that name follows. For a comprehensive list, see and.

- Józef Beck (1894–1944), Polish foreign minister in the 1930s
- Józef Bem (1794–1850), Polish general, Ottoman pasha and a national hero of Poland and Hungary
- Józef Bilczewski (1860–1923), Polish Catholic archbishop and saint
- Józef Brandt (1841–1915), Polish painter
- Józef Ćwierczakiewicz (1822–1869), Polish journalist
- Jozef M.L.T. Cals (1914–1971), prime minister of the Netherlands from 1965 to 1966
- Józef Marian Chełmoński (1849–1914), Polish painter
- Jozef Chovanec (born 1960), Slovak footballer
- Jozef De Beenhouwer (born 1948), Belgian pianist, music teacher and musicologist
- Jozef De Kesel (born 1947), Belgian cardinal of the Roman Catholic Church
- Jozef De Veuster (1840–1889), Belgian missionary better known as Father Damien
- Jozef Dobrotka (born 1952), Slovak handball player
- Józef Elsner (1769–1854), Silesian composer, music teacher, and music theoretician
- Józef Fortuna (born 1952), Polish politician
- Jozef Gabčík (1912–1942), Slovak soldier in the Czechoslovak army involved in Operation Anthropoid
- Jozef A.A. Geeraerts (1930–2015), Belgian writer
- Józef Grudzień (1939–2017), Polish boxer and Olympic champion
- Józef Kazimierz Hofmann (1876–1957), Polish American pianist, composer, and inventor
- Jozef Israëls (1824–1911), Dutch painter
- Józef Klotz (1900–1941), Polish footballer
- Jozef Lenárt (1923–2004), Slovak Prime Minister of Czechoslovakia from 1963–68
- Józef Lubański (1914–1946), Polish theoretical physicist
- Józef Lustgarten (1899–1973), Polish footballer
- Jozef Markuš (1944–2025), Slovak politician
- Jozef Moravčík (born 1945), Slovak diplomat and politician, Prime Minister of Slovakia (1994)
- Jozef Teodor Mousson (1887–1946), Slovak Impressionist painter
- Jozef Murgaš (1864–1929), Slovak inventor, architect, botanist, painter, and priest
- Jozef Peeters (1895–1960), Belgian painter
- Józef Piłsudski (1867–1935), Polish head of state and commander-in-chief of the armed forces
- Józef Pińkowski (1929–2000), Polish Communist politician, Prime Minister from 1980 to 1981
- Józef Poniatowski (1763–1813), Polish political and military leader
- Jozef Pribilinec (born 1960), Slovak racewalker
- Jozef Ráž (born 1954), Slovak musician
- Jozef Ráž (born 1979), Slovak politician
- Józef Rotblat (1908–2005), Polish physicist
- Józef Roszyński (born 1962), Polish clergyman and bishop
- Józef Szajba (1910–1945), Polish sailor
- Józef Szmidt (born 1935), Polish retired triple jumper, world record holder and twice Olympic champion
- Jozef Stümpel (born 1972), Slovak former National Hockey League player
- Jozef Tiso (1887–1947), Slovak priest and puppet head of state of Slovakia from 1939 to 1945 executed for war crimes
- Jozef Tomko (1924–2022), Slovak Cardinal of the Roman Catholic Church
- Jozef Tuchyňa (1941–2019), Slovak general and politician
- Jozef Van Roey (1874–1961), Belgian Cardinal of the Roman Catholic Church
- Jozef Vengloš (1936–2021), Slovak football coach
- Jozef Viskupič (born 1976), Slovak politician
- Józef Andrzej Załuski (1702–1774), Polish Bishop of Kiev and bibliophile

== See also ==
- Joseph
- Josef
- József
