= Fortuna (surname) =

Fortuna is a surname. Notable people with the surname include:

- Brian Fortuna (born 1982), American professional ballroom dancer, choreographer and instructor
- Diana Fortuna (born 1956), American businesswoman
- Diego Fortuna (born 1968), Italian retired discus thrower
- Hoji Fortuna (born 1974), Angolan actor
- Javier Fortuna (born 1990), Dominican professional boxer, former WBA Super Featherweight champion
- Jeric Fortuna (born 1991), Philippine Basketball Association player
- Józef Fortuna (born 1952), Polish politician
- Loris Fortuna (1924–1985), Italian left-wing politician
- Maciej Fortuna, Polish trumpet player, composer and musical educator
- Manuel Fortuna (born 1985), Dominican basketball player
- Mario Fortuna (1911–1968), Argentine actor
- Núrio Fortuna (born 1995), Angolan footballer
- Stan Fortuna (born 1957), Catholic priest notable for his evangelical musical contributions
- Wallace Fortuna dos Santos (born 1994), Brazilian footballer
- Wojciech Fortuna (born 1952), Polish ski jumper and Olympic champion
