= Toyohiko =

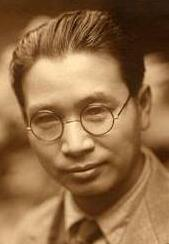
- Toyohiko Kagawa (1888–1960), Japanese Christian pacifist
- Pronunciation: tojoçiko (IPA)
- Gender: Male

Origin
- Origin: Japanese
- Meaning: Different meanings depending on the kanji used

Toyohiko is a masculine Japanese given name.

== Written forms ==
Toyohiko can be written using different combinations of kanji characters. Here are some examples:

- 登代彦, "climb up, generation, elegant boy"
- 豊彦, "bountiful, elegant boy"
- 豊比古, "bountiful, young man (archaic)"

The name can also be written in hiragana とよひこ or katakana トヨヒコ.

== Notable people with the name ==
- Toyohiko Hozumi (穂積 豊彦; born 1952), Japanese handball player.
- Toyohiko Kagawa (賀川 豊彦; 1888–1960), Japanese Christian pacifist, reformer and labor activist.
- Toyohiko Sato (佐藤 豊彦; born 1943), Japanese lutenist and composer.
