= Søren Andersen (disambiguation) =

Søren Andersen (born 1970) is a Danish footballer who participated in the 1996 European Championship.

Søren Andersen may also refer to:

- Søren Andersen (footballer, born 1925) (1925–1998), Danish footballer
- Søren Andersen (footballer, born 1937) (1937–1960), Danish footballer who was the top goalscorer of the 1957 Danish football championship
- Søren Andersen (handballer) (born 1948), Danish handballer who competed at the 1976 Summer Olympics
- Søren Norby (died 1530), full name Søren Andersen Norby, a Danish 16th century grand admiral
- Søren Andersen, Norwegian sailor who first spotted Veier Head
- Søren Kragh Andersen (born 1994), Danish cyclist
