= Fujinaka =

Fujinaka (written: 藤中) is a Japanese surname. Notable people with the surname include:

- Kenji Fujinaka (藤中 憲二, born 1947), Japanese handball player
- Kenya Fujinaka (藤中 謙也, born 1993), Japanese volleyball player
