= Jesper Petersen =

Jesper Petersen may refer to:

- Jesper Petersen (handballer)
- Jesper Petersen (politician)
