= Shibata =

Shibata may refer to:

== Places ==
- Shibata, Miyagi, a town in Miyagi Prefecture
- Shibata District, Miyagi, a district in Miyagi Prefecture
- Shibata, Niigata, a city in Niigata Prefecture
  - Shibata Station (Niigata), a railway station in Niigata Prefecture
- Shibata Domain, a former feudal domain under the Tokugawa shogunate
- Shibata Station (Aichi), a railway station in Aichi Prefecture

== Other uses ==
- Shibata (surname), a Japanese surname
- Shibata clan, Japanese clan originating in the 12th century
- Shibata coupler, Train Coupler
