= Desormeaux =

Desormeaux is a French surname that may refer to

- Antonin Jean Desormeaux, 19th century French inventor
- J. Keith Desormeaux (born c. 1967), American horse trainer
- Kent Desormeaux (born 1970), American jockey, brother of Keith
- Mélissa Désormeaux-Poulin (born 1981), French Canadian actress
- Michael Desormeaux (born 1985), American football defensive back
- Pierre Désormeaux (born 1952), Canadian handball player

== See also ==
- Dollard-des-Ormeaux, on-island suburb of Montreal in Canada
- Childs v Desormeaux, a Supreme Court of Canada decision on the topic of social host liability
