= Erlenbach am Main =

Erlenbach a.Main
- Town
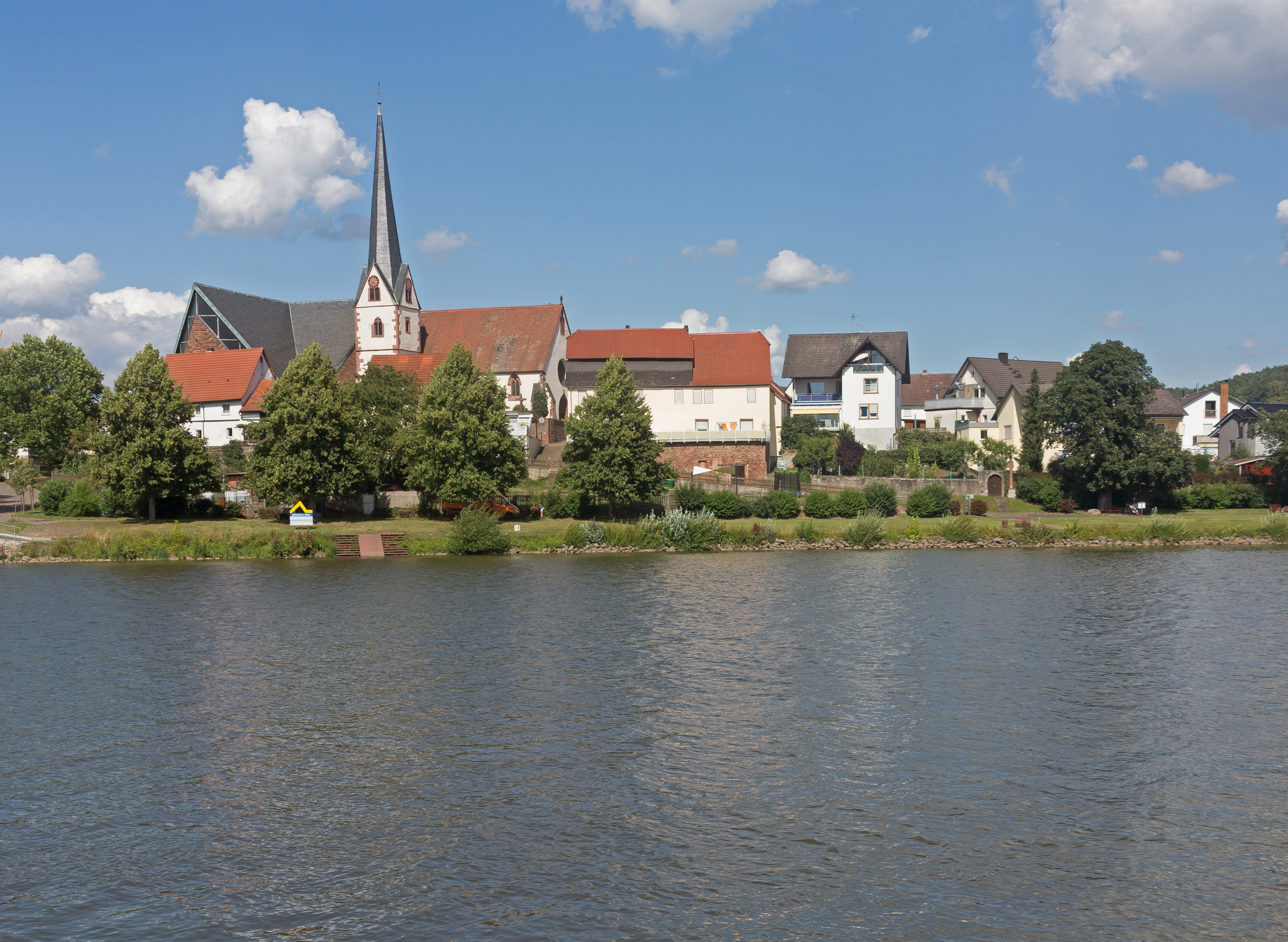
- Erlenbach am Main

- Coat of arms

- Location of Erlenbach a.Main within Miltenberg district
- Interactive map of Erlenbach a.Main
- Location within Germany Location within Bavaria
- Coordinates: 49°48′14″N 9°9′50″E
- Country: Germany
- State: Bavaria
- Admin. region: Unterfranken
- District: Miltenberg
- Subdivisions: 3 Stadtteile

Government
  - Mayor (2023–29): Christoph Becker (CSU)

Area
  - Total: 16.31 km^{2} (6.30 sq mi)
- Elevation: 129 m (423 ft)

Population (2025-12-31)
  - Total: 9,688
  - Density: 594.0/km^{2} (1,538/sq mi)
- Time zone: UTC+01:00 (CET)
  - Summer (DST): UTC+02:00 (CEST)
- Postal codes: 63906
- Dialling codes: 09372
- Vehicle registration: MIL
- Website: www.stadt-erlenbach.de

Erlenbach am Main (German pronunciation: [ˈɛʁlənbax ʔam ˈmaɪn], lit. 'Erlenbach on the Main'; officially: Erlenbach a.Main) is the largest town in the Miltenberg district in the Regierungsbezirk of Lower Franconia (Unterfranken) in Bavaria, Germany. It has a population of around 10,000.

Erlenbach is the site of one of the Miltenberg district's two hospitals, and is well known for its wine. Until 25 years ago, Erlenbach was Bavaria's newest town.

== Geography ==
=== Location ===
Erlenbach lies in Lower Franconia in Bavaria's northwest, at the Mainviereck (“Main Square”), near Aschaffenburg.

=== Constituent communities ===
The formerly self-administering neighbouring communities of Mechenhard and Streit were amalgamated with Erlenbach in 1976 and 1978, respectively.

== History ==
The local area has been inhabited at least since the late Bronze Age, based on archaeological findings. In 1876, four barrows from the Bronze Age (roughly 1550–1250 BC) were discovered. In 1981, two typical Urnfield culture graves from the time about 1000–800 BC were found.

In the 1st century AD, the Roman Empire reached all the way to the Main. This watery stretch of the Limes Germanicus was enforced with castra. To avoid the Romans, the Germanic peoples moved their settlements to the other side of the Main, the east side, or right bank. After the Roman Empire fell, it took many years for the Franks to move into the Main region in 531 and found settlements of their own.

The first farms in Erlenbach were likely only built sometime between 800 and 950.

About 1183, Emperor Friedrich Barbarossa granted Erlenbach market rights. The Imperial award was given visible expression with a market and freedom sign. It shows a large cross on whose top stands a cock. On the crossbeam a hand rises up on one side and on the other a sword. The upheld hand made clear that the Erlenbach dwellers stood under the Emperor's special protection, and that any who set himself against it would have to reckon with the sovereign's upraised sword.

== Demographics ==
=== Religion ===
Besides the Catholic churches Saint Peter's and Saint Paul's, Saint Joseph’s (main town), Saint Joseph’s (outlying centre of Mechenhard) and Saint Charles Borromeo’s there is also the Evangelical Martin Luther Church.

Since January 2007 there has also been the Evangelical Free Church Erlenbach Congregation, which in April 2009 counted 61 members.

== Economy ==
Since 1918, Erlenbach has been the site of a shipyard that as of 2003 was "one of the largest inland vessel yards" in Europe.

== Governance ==
=== Town council ===
The council is made up of 24 council members, with seats apportioned thus:

- CSU 10
- SPD 7
- Bündnis 90/Die Grünen 5
- Freie Wähler 2

=== Mayors ===
The Mayor is Christoph Becker (CSU), and the deputies are Alexander Monert (CSU) and Jörg Barth (Freie Wähler).

=== Town twinning ===
- Saint-Maurice, Val-de-Marne, France
- Erlenbach, Canton of Zürich, Switzerland
- Erlenbach im Simmental, Canton of Bern, Switzerland

=== Coat of arms ===
The town's arms might be described thus: Or an eagle with two heads displayed sable crowned on each head gules with studs of the field, armed and beaked of the field holding in his talon dexter an orb of the third banded and ensigned with a cross of the field and in his talon sinister a sword of the third, in chief an Elector's crown proper.

This coat of arms, newly conferred upon the market community of Erlenbach am Main in 1953 is based on two seals known to have been borne by the Erlenbach court in the time from 1722 to 1810 and whose images matched each other. Both seals showed a crowned two-headed eagle holding a monarch's orb in the right talon and a sword in the left. Floating above the eagle's heads was an Elector's crown, and underneath their heads were the letters E and B (Erlenbach).

== Culture and sightseeing ==
The renovated Frankenhalle offers theatre, musicals and concerts. The Kino-Passage cinema has operated since 1979 as a repertory cinema. There are also many festivals and markets.

Winegrowing is only confirmed as a local practice by a document from 2 January 1261. Since 1990, Erlenbach has been located on the Fränkischer Rotwein Wanderweg ("Franconian Red Wine Hiking Trail"), a along-distance hiking path.

== Sports ==
The town's association football club SV Erlenbach, formed in 1919, experienced its greatest success in 2013 when it won promotion to the Bayernliga for the first time.

== Gallery ==
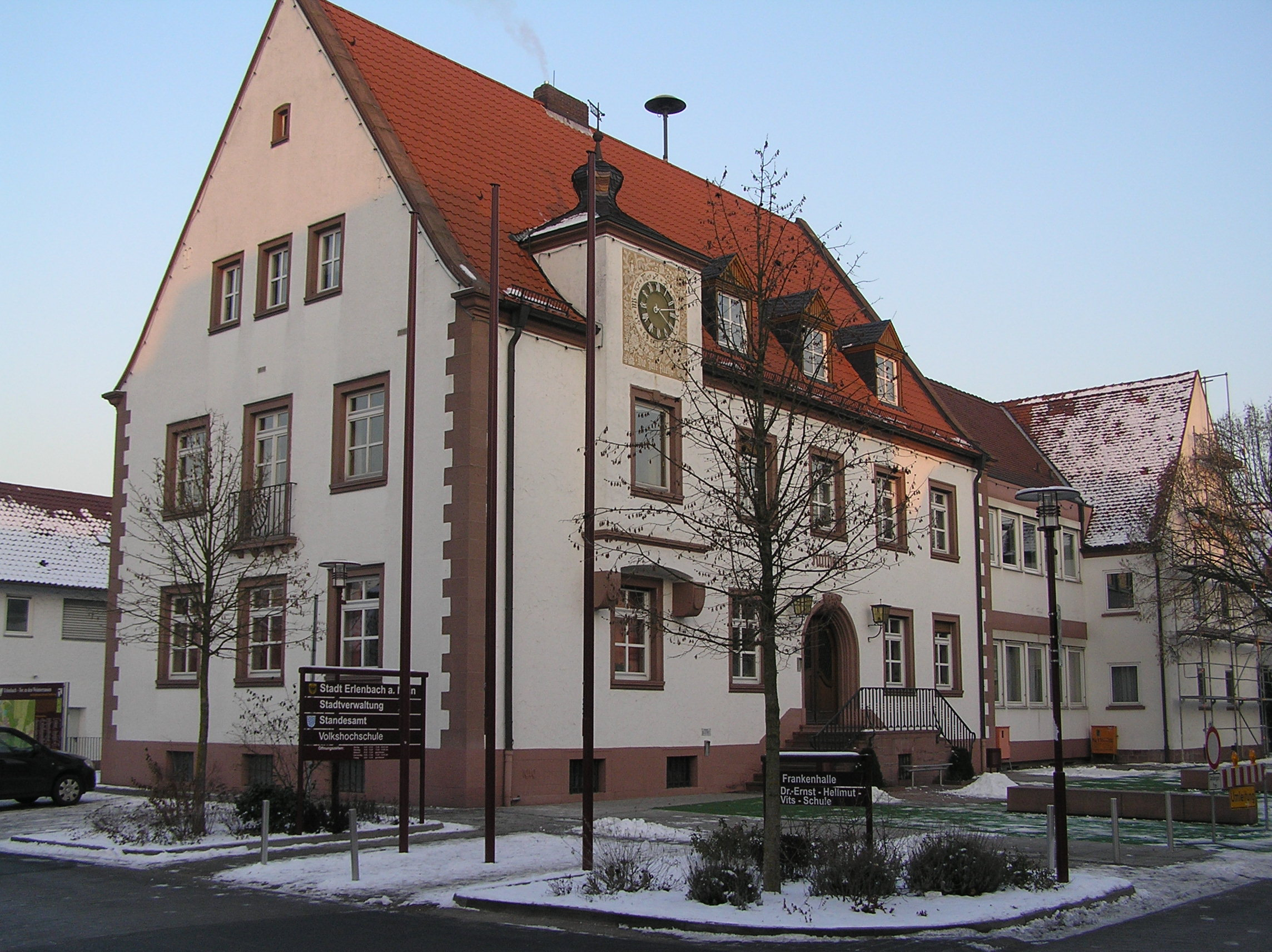
Town hall

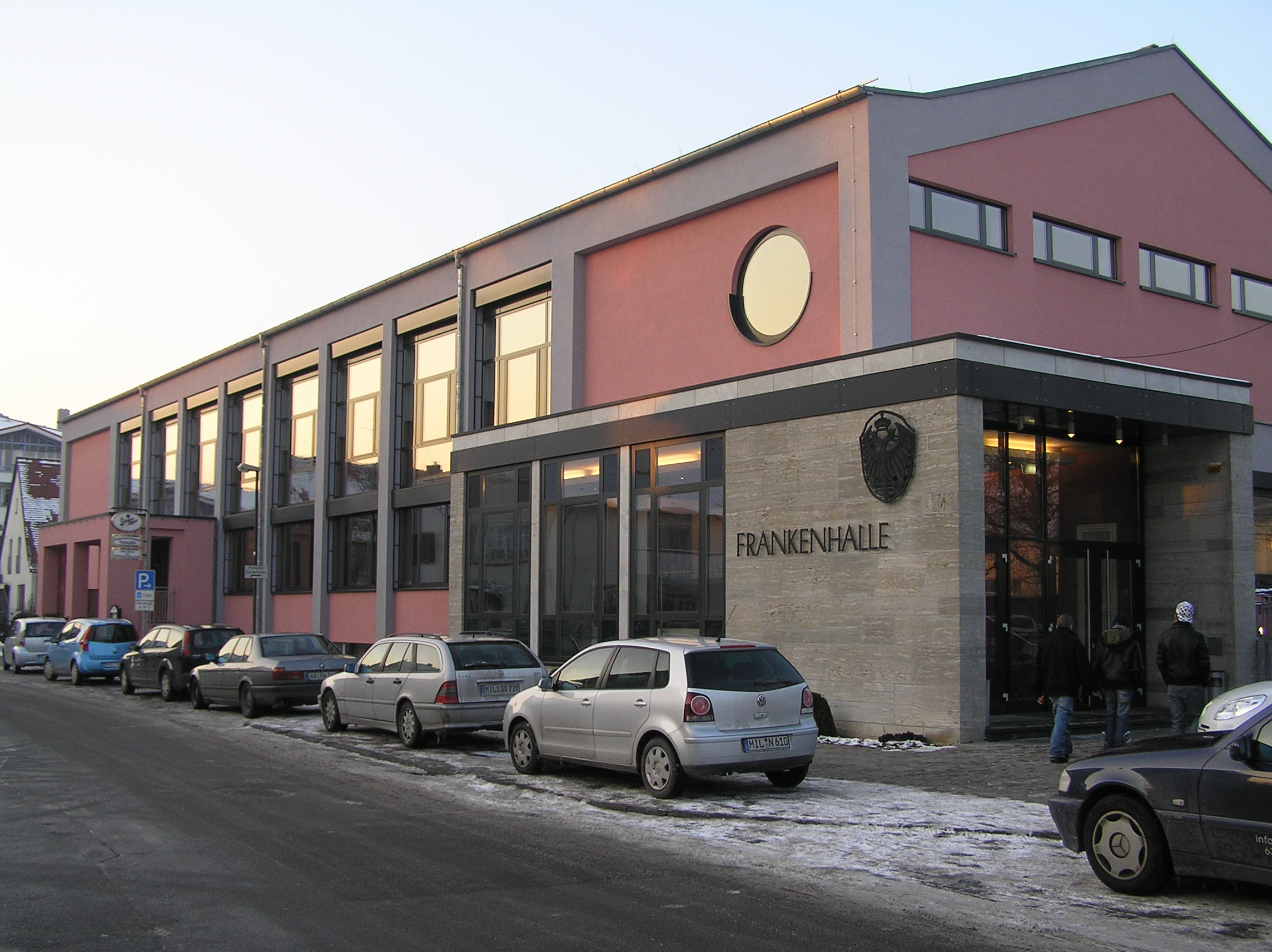
Frankenhalle

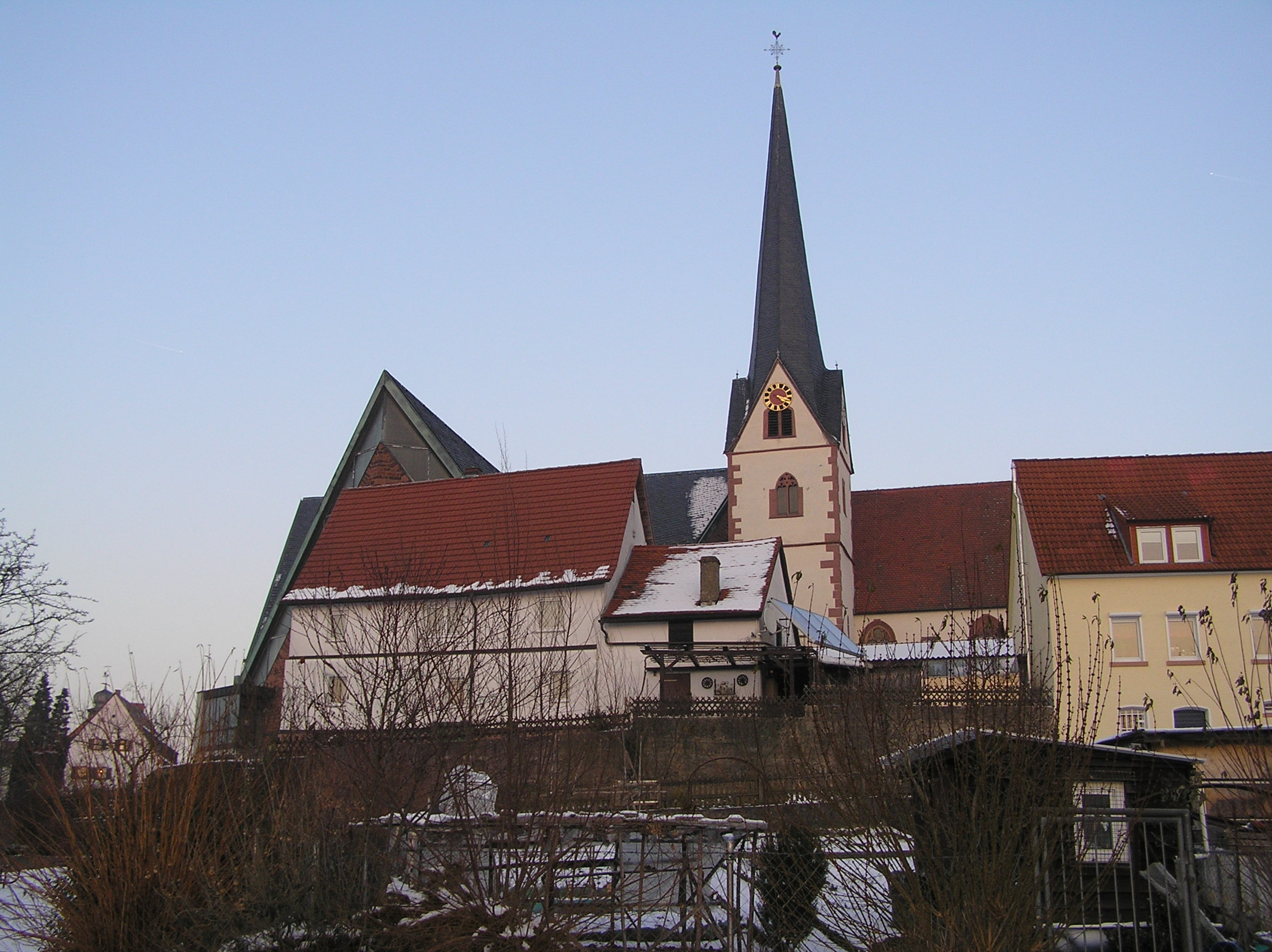
Saint Peter's and Saint Paul's Church

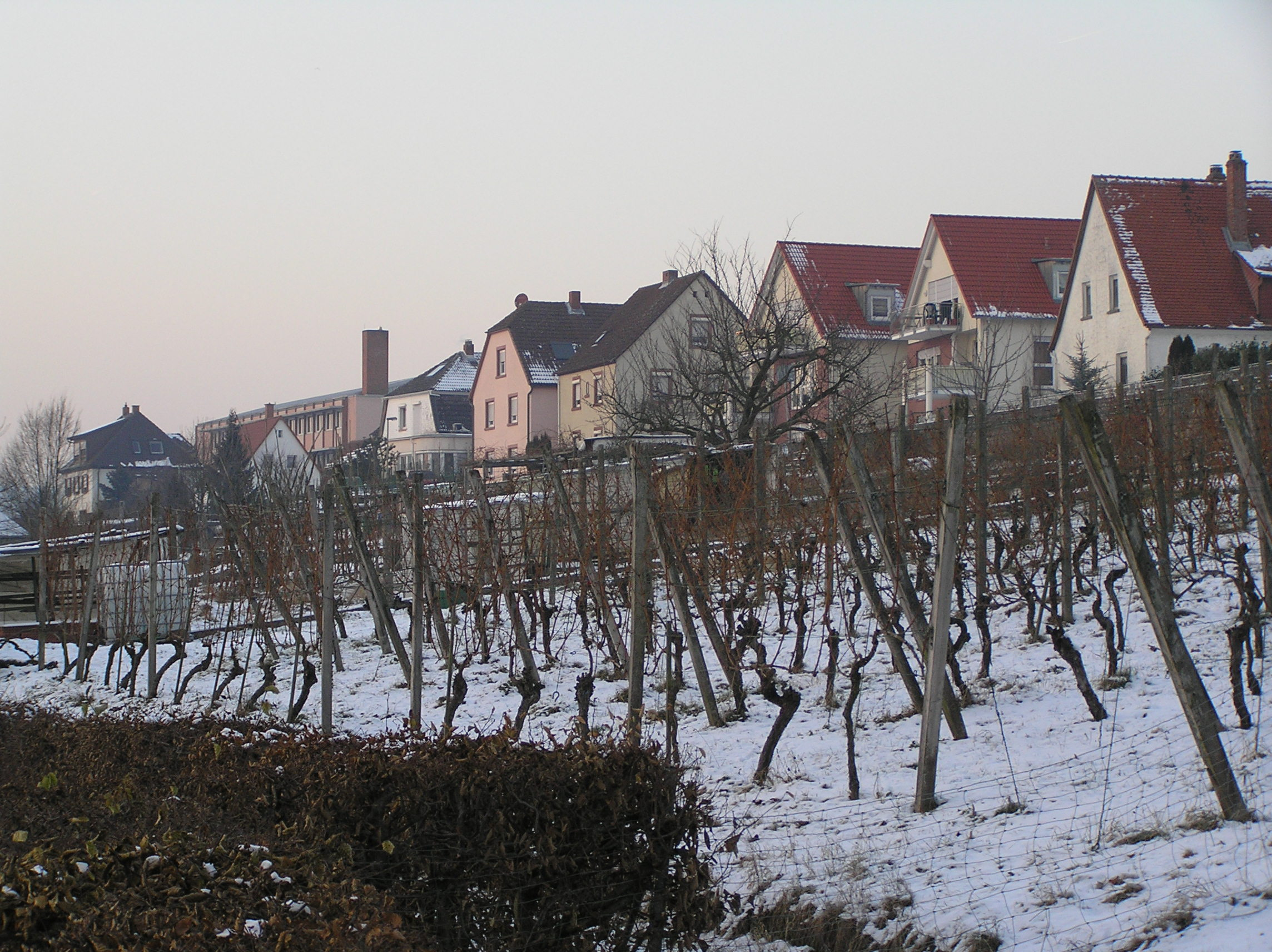
Vineyards on the banks of the Main

== Notable people ==
Friedrich Guggenberger(1915-1988), U-boat captain during the Second World War.

=== Sons and daughters of the town ===
- Aloys Schmitt (1788-1866), composer, pianist and music pedagogue
- Marliese Arold (born 1958), children's and young people's book author
- Carsten Schloter (1963-2013), manager, CEO of Swisscom
- Thomas Kroth (born 1959), football national player
- Dirk Hartmann (born 1964), psychologist and philosopher
- Leon Köhler (born 1999), racing driver

=== Connected with Erlenbach ===
- Kurt Klühspies (born 1952), German handball world champion
