= Radivoje Krivokapić =

Serbian handball player (1953–2024)

Personal information
- Nationality: Serbian
- Born: 11 September 1953 Senta, AP Vojvodina, PR Serbia, FPR Yugoslavia
- Died: 12 November 2024 (aged 71) Senta, Vojvodina, Serbia
- Height: 1.92 m (6 ft 4 in)

Sport
- Sport: Handball
- Position: Left back

Youth career
- Years: Team
- –: Senta

Senior clubs
- Years: Team
- –: Senta
- –: Potisje Ada
- 1972–1973: Partizan
- –: Potisje Ada
- –: Slovan
- 1982–1983: SG Dietzenbach
- 1983–1985: Tecnisa Alicante
- 1986–1987: Tecnisán Alicante
National team
- Years: Team
- –: Yugoslavia
Medal record
Men's handball
Representing Yugoslavia
World Championship
Silver medal – second place	1982 West Germany	Team
Mediterranean Games
Gold medal – first place	1979 Split	Team

Radivoje Krivokapić (Serbian Cyrillic: Радивоје Кривокапић; 11 September 1953 – 12 November 2024) was a Serbian handball player who competed for Yugoslavia in the 1976 Summer Olympics.

== Club career ==
After starting out at Senta, Krivokapić played for Partizan in the 1972–73 season, as the club suffered relegation from the top flight. He would later move to Slovan, helping them win the championship title in 1980 and reach the European Cup final in 1981. Later on, Krivokapić left Yugoslavia and went to Germany in 1982, spending one season with SG Dietzenbach. He subsequently moved to Spain and played for Tecnisa Alicante from 1983 to 1985. Krivokapić also played for the club in the 1986–87 season.

== International career ==
At international level, Krivokapić represented Yugoslavia at the 1976 Summer Olympics. He also participated in two World Championships, winning the silver medal in 1982.

== Personal life and death ==
His nephews were handball players Marko Krivokapić and Milorad Krivokapić. He died from a heart attack in Senta, on 12 November 2024, at the age of 71.

== Honours ==
Slovan

- Yugoslav Handball Championship: 1979–80
