= Großwallstadt =

- Municipality
- Flag Coat of arms

- Location of Großwallstadt within Miltenberg district
- Interactive map of Großwallstadt
- Location within Germany Location within Bavaria
- Coordinates: 49°53′N 9°10′E
- Country: Germany
- State: Bavaria
- Admin. region: Unterfranken
- District: Miltenberg

Government
  - Mayor (2020–26): Roland Eppig (FW)

Area
  - Total: 14.03 km^{2} (5.42 sq mi)
- Elevation: 121 m (397 ft)

Population (2025-12-31)
  - Total: 4,155
  - Density: 296.2/km^{2} (767.0/sq mi)
- Time zone: UTC+01:00 (CET)
  - Summer (DST): UTC+02:00 (CEST)
- Postal codes: 63868
- Dialling codes: 06022
- Vehicle registration: MIL
- Website: www.grosswallstadt.de

Großwallstadt (or Grosswallstadt) is a municipality in the Miltenberg district in the Regierungsbezirk of Lower Franconia (Unterfranken) in Bavaria, Germany.

== Geography ==
=== Location ===
Großwallstadt lies in the Bavarian Lower Main (Bayerischer Untermain) Region.

The community has only the Gemarkung (traditional rural cadastral area) of Großwallstadt.

== History ==
As part of the Archbishopric of Mainz, Großwallstadt passed at Secularization in 1803 to the newly formed Principality of Aschaffenburg, with which it passed in 1814 (by this time it had become a department of the Grand Duchy of Frankfurt) to Bavaria.

=== Population development ===
Within town limits, 3,011 inhabitants were counted in 1970, 3,345 in 1987 and in 2005 4,091.

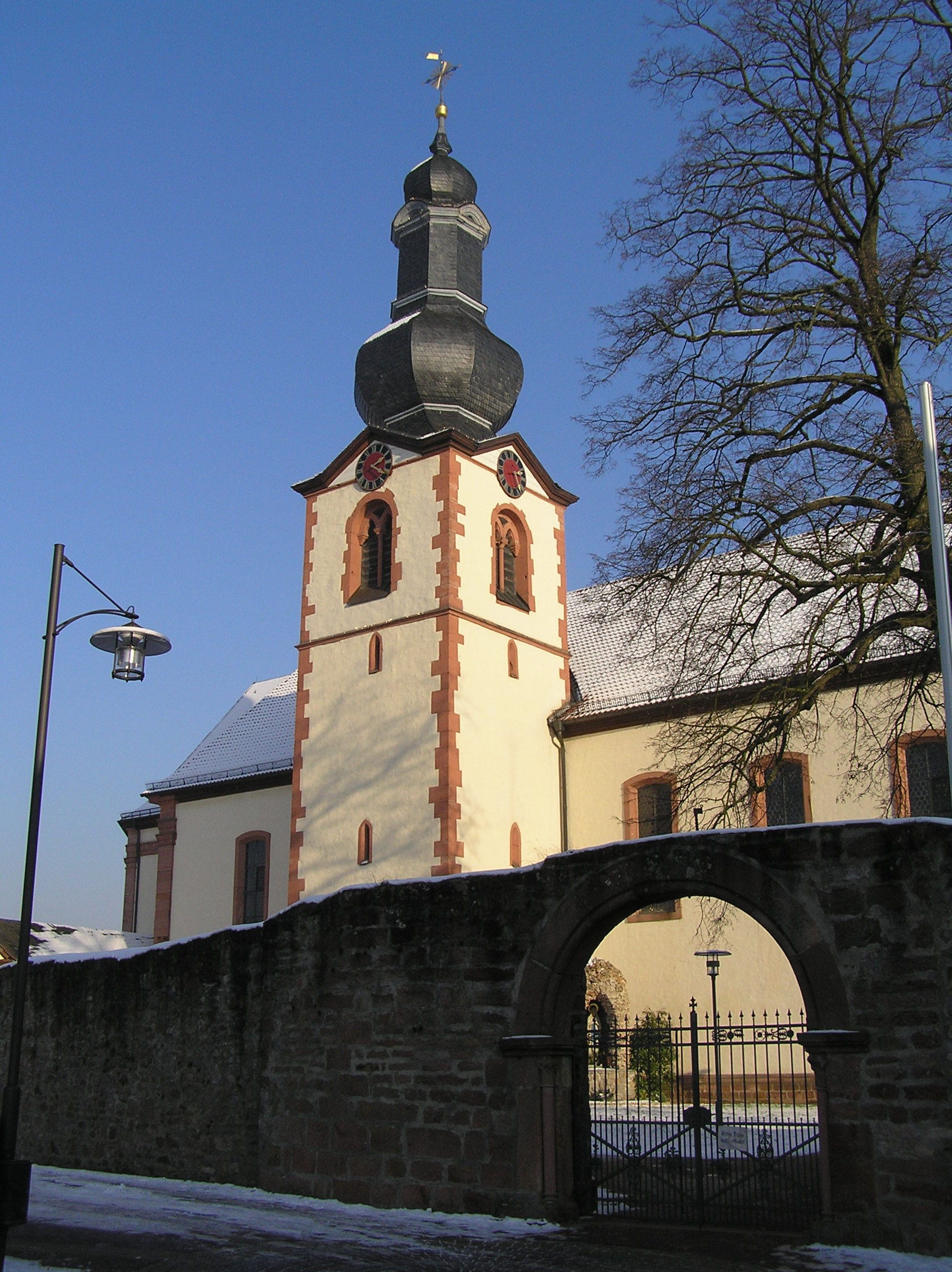
Saint Peter's and Saint Paul's Parish Church

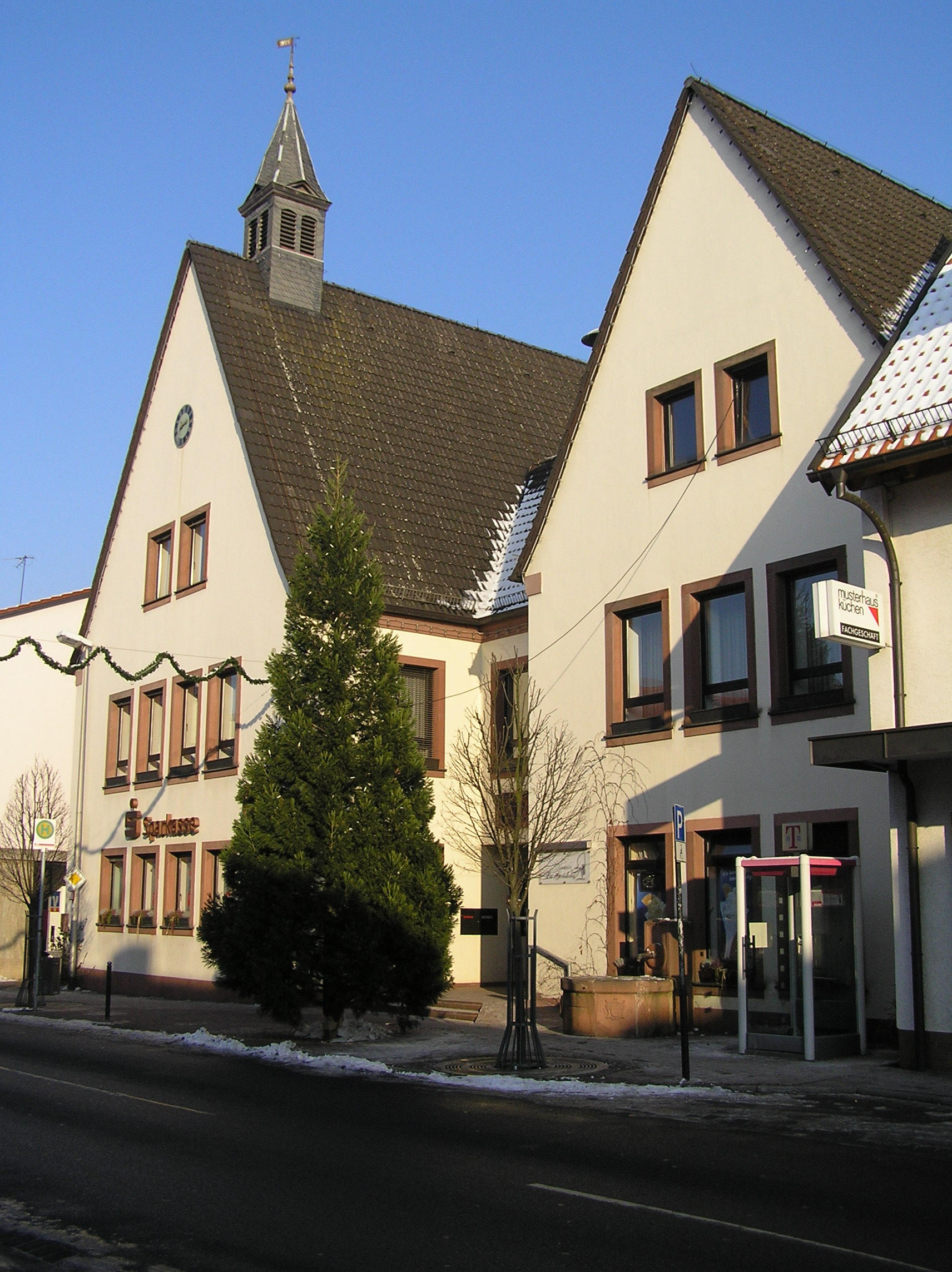
Town Hall

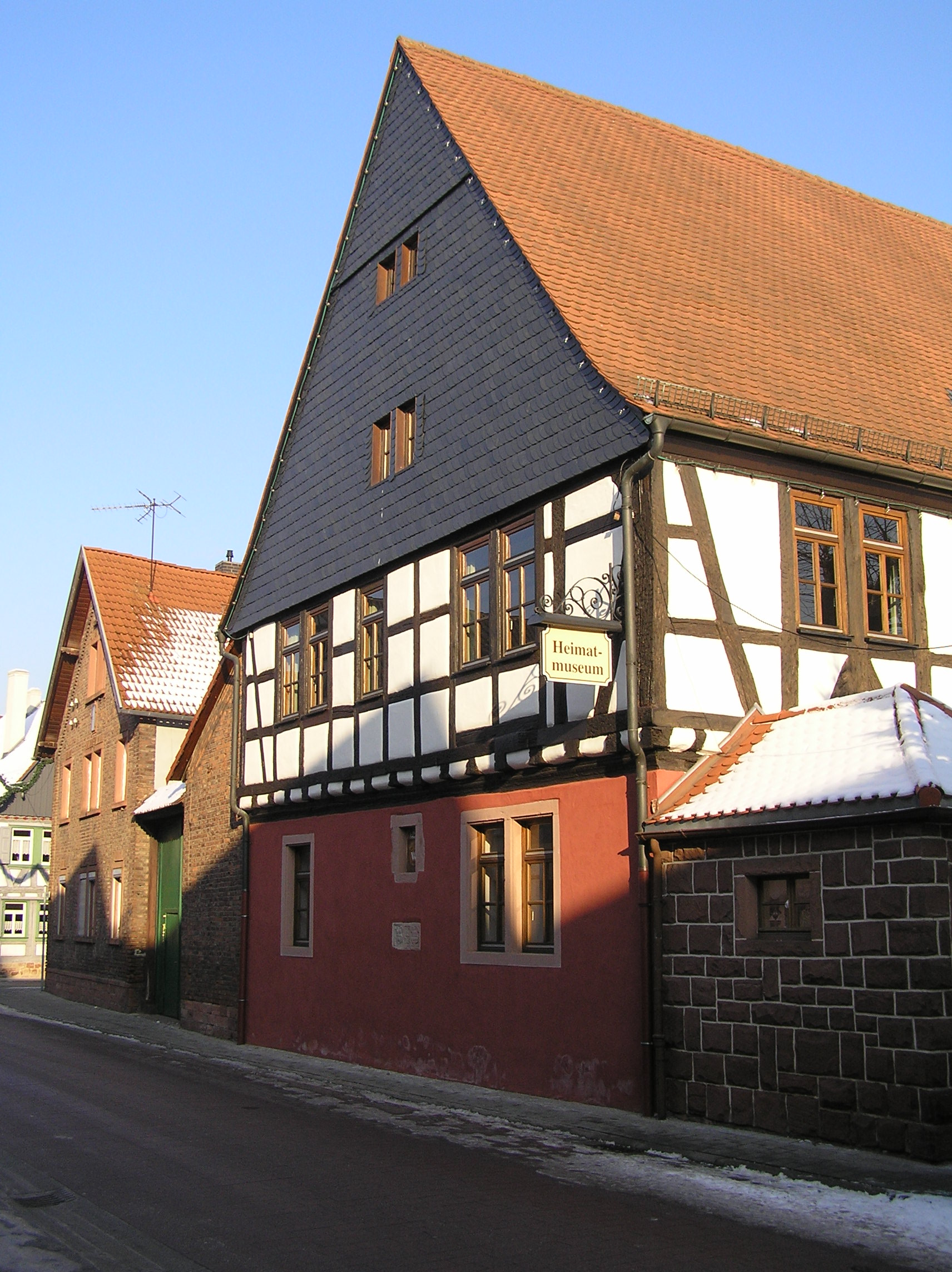
Local history museum

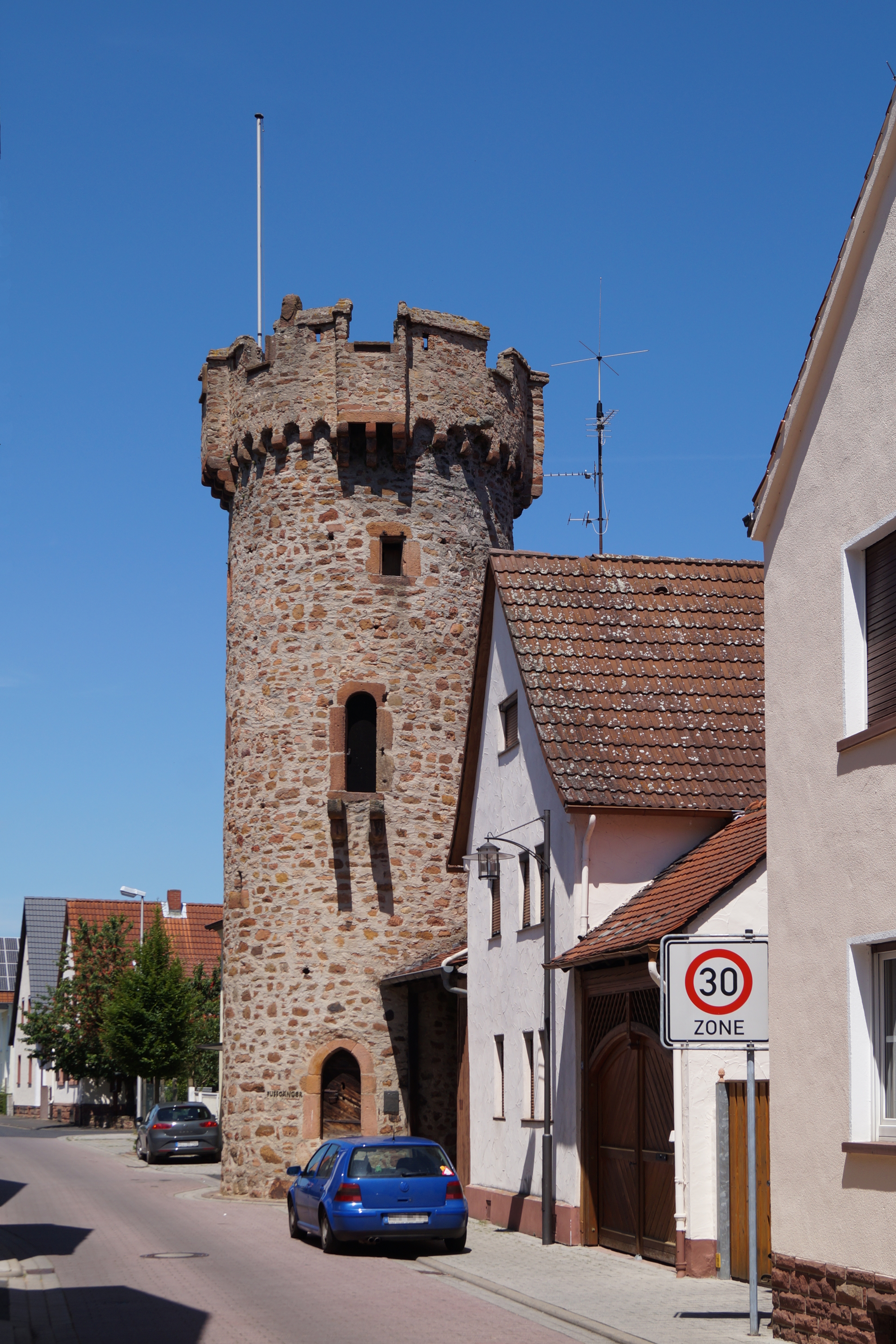
Village tower

== Politics ==
The mayor is Roland Eppig (FW). In 2008 he succeeded Reinhold Köhler (CSU).

=== Town council ===
The council is made up of 16 council members, with seats apportioned thus:

- Freie Wähler: 6 seats
- CSU: 4 seats
- Bürger für Großwallstadt (BfG): 4 seats
- SPD: 2 seats

=== Coat of arms ===
The community's arms might be described thus: Gules a crown with two arches pearled ensigned with a cross Or, the whole surmounted by the letter W argent.

Although the example in this article appears purple (which would be “purpure” in English heraldry), the German blazon clearly states In Rot… (that is, “In red…”). Hence, the word “gules” has been used above.

The arms come from an emblem from 1755 that was on the parish church's façade. The crown and the W refer to the community's former names of Königswallstadt (“King’s Wallstadt”) and Wallstadt Regis (the same, regis being the Latin genitive of rex – “king”). The tinctures argent and gules (silver and red) refer to the community's feudal overlord, the Archbishopric of Mainz.

The arms have been borne since 1957.

== Sports ==
TV 1888 Großwallstadt is the most successful Bavarian team in the men's Handball-Bundesliga. The club has won the German Bundesliga six times, last in 1990.

== Economy and infrastructure ==
According to official statistics, there were 29 workers on the social welfare contribution rolls working in agriculture and forestry in 1998. In producing businesses this was 801, and in trade and transport 102. In other areas, 139 workers on the social welfare contribution rolls were employed, and 1,536 such workers worked from home. There were 16 processing businesses. Three businesses were in construction.

The biggest employer, with roughly 1,000 employees is Ciba Vision GmbH, which deals in research, development, manufacture and marketing of contact lenses and products for their care.

=== Transport ===
Großwallstadt lies on the Fränkischer Rotwein Wanderweg (“Franconian Red Wine Hiking Trail”)

=== Education ===
As of 2005 the following institutions existed in Großwallstadt:

- Kindergartens: 200 places with 174 children
- Primary schools: 1 with 17 teachers and 347 pupils

== Famous people ==
- Norbert Geis (b. 13 January 1939), politician (CSU)
- Manfred Hofmann (b. 30 January 1948), former world-class German handball goalkeeper
