= Radisav Pavićević =

Serbian handball player (1951–2019)

Personal information
- Full name: Radisav Pavićević
- Nationality: Serbian
- Born: 12 October 1951 FPR Yugoslavia
- Died: 19 February 2019 (aged 67) Novi Sad, Serbia
- Height: 1.92 m (6 ft 4 in)

Sport
- Sport: Handball
- Position: Left back

Senior clubs
- Years: Team
- –: Crvenka
- 1980–1982: SG Dietzenbach
- –: TuRU Düsseldorf
National team
- Years: Team
- –: Yugoslavia
Medal record
Men's handball
Representing Yugoslavia
World Championship
Bronze medal – third place	1974 East Germany	Team
Mediterranean Games
Gold medal – first place	1975 Algiers	Team
Gold medal – first place	1979 Split	Team

Radisav "Čile" Pavićević (Serbian Cyrillic: Радисав Чиле Павићевић; 12 October 1951 – 19 February 2019) was a Serbian handball player who competed for Yugoslavia in the 1976 Summer Olympics.

== Club career ==
Pavićević started out at Crvenka and served the club for over a decade, before moving abroad to Germany. He would go on to play for SG Dietzenbach (1980–1982) and TuRU Düsseldorf in the Handball-Bundesliga.

== International career ==
At international level, Pavićević represented Yugoslavia in two World Championships, winning the bronze medal in 1974. He also competed at the 1976 Summer Olympics.
