= Shibata (surname) =

Shibata (written: 柴田 lit. "brushwood, ricefield") is the 63rd most common Japanese surname. Less common variants are 芝田 and 新発田. Notable people with the surname include:

- Ai Shibata (柴田 亜衣; born 1982), Japanese swimmer
- Akane Shibata (柴田 あかね; born 1988), Japanese field hockey player
- Aki Shibata (芝田 安希; born 1981), Japanese volleyball player
- Ayumi Shibata (柴田 あゆみ; born 1984), Japanese singer
- Chieno Shibata (柴田 智恵野; born 1953), Japanese swimmer
- Go Shibata (柴田 剛; born 1975), Japanese film director
- Hidekatsu Shibata (柴田 秀勝; born 1937), Japanese voice actor
- Hidetsugu Shibata (柴田 英嗣; born 1975), Japanese comedian
- Hiroyuki Shibata (柴田 博之; born 1963), Japanese long jumper
- Jun Shibata (柴田 淳; born 1976), Japanese singer-songwriter
- Kanjuro Shibata XX (1921–2013), kyudo master and bowmaker
- Shibata Katsuie (柴田 勝家; 1522–1583), Japanese samurai and military commander
- Shibata Katsutoyo (1556–1583), Japanese samurai commander
- Katsuyori Shibata (柴田 勝頼; born 1979), Japanese professional wrestler and mixed martial artist
- Kayoko Shibata (柴田 かよこ; born 1980), Japanese actress, singer and model
- Kiyonari Shibata (柴田 清成; born 1973), Japanese middle-distance runner
- Kuniaki Shibata (柴田 国明; born 1947), Japanese professional boxer
- Kunio Shibata (柴田 国男; born 1948), Japanese cross-country skier
- Masaki Shibata (柴田 正章; born 1953), Japanese handball player
- Shibata Naganori (新発田 長敦; 1538–1580), Japanese samurai and military commander
- Noriyoshi Shibata (柴田 のりよし; born 1966), Japanese photographer
- Ryo Shibata (柴田 嶺; born 1987), Japanese figure skater
- Ryuichi Shibata (柴田 隆一; born 1983), Japanese butterfly swimmer
- Saki Shibata (芝田 沙季; born 1997), Japanese table tennis player
- Satoru Shibata (柴田 聡; born 1962), Japanese chief executive
- Seiji Shibata (柴田 征二; born 1938), Japanese fencer
- Sosuke Shibata (柴田 壮介; born 2001), Japanese footballer
- Shibata Takenaka (柴田 剛中; 1823–1877), Japanese diplomat
- Shibata Takumi (Diet member) (柴田巧; born 1960), member of the House of Councilors
- Shibata Takumi (fund manager), Japanese fund manager
- Tetsuya Shibata (柴田 徹也; born 1973), Japanese video game music composer and sound director
- Tomoyo Shibata (柴田 倫世; born 1974), Japanese announcer
- Toshio Shibata (柴田 敏雄; born 1949), Japanese photographer
- Toyo Shibata (柴田 トヨ; 1911–2013), Japanese poet
- Tsunekichi Shibata (柴田 常吉; 1850–1929), Japanese film director
- Yoshitomi Shibata (柴田 善臣; born 1966), Japanese jockey
- Yumiko Shibata (柴田 由美子; born 1964), Japanese voice actress
- Shibata Zeshin (柴田 是真; 1807–1891), Japanese painter and lacquerer
