= Horst Spengler =

German handball player (born 1950)

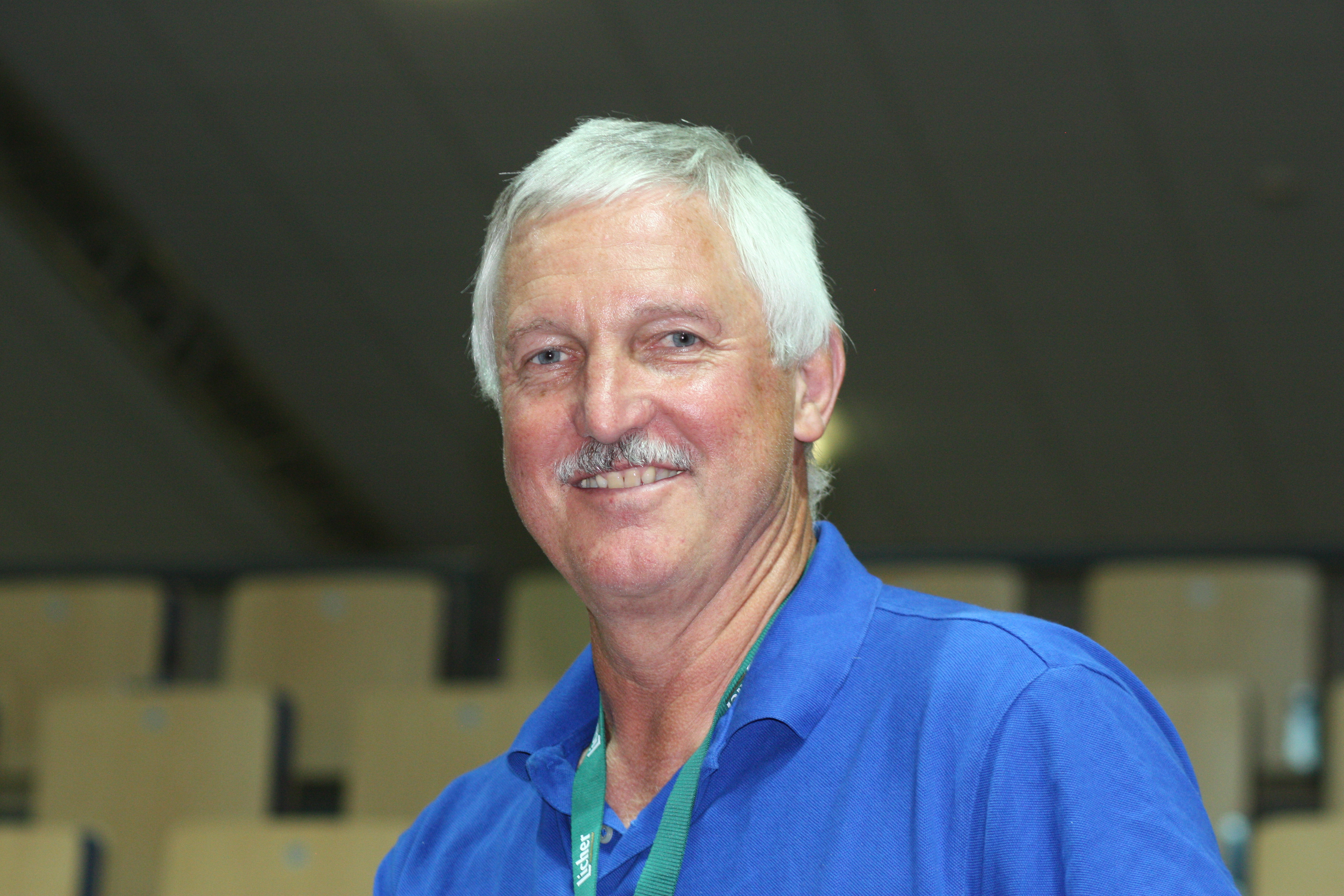
Horst Spengler (2013)

Horst Spengler (born 10 February 1950 in Gießen-Lützellinden, Hesse) is a former West German handball player who competed in the 1976 Summer Olympics.

In 1976, he was part of the West German team which finished fourth in the Olympic tournament. He played all six matches and scored ten goals.

After his player career, he was team coach for HSG Wetzlar and SG Wallau.
