= Arno Ehret =

German handball player (born 1953)

Arno Ehret (born 11 December 1953 in Lahr) is a former West German handball player who competed in the 1976 Summer Olympics.

In 1976, he was part of the West German team which finished fourth in the Olympic tournament. He played all six matches and scored 21 goals.
