= Bent Larsen (handballer) =

Danish handball player (born 1954)

Bent Larsen (born 13 July 1954) is a Danish former handball player and javelin throw athlete. He competed in the 1976 Summer Olympics in handball.

== Handball ==
Larsen played his club handball with Aalborg HK, and was the top goalscorer of the club in the 1978, 1979, 1980 and 1982 Danish Handball League seasons.

He debuted for the Danish national team in November 1973 in a match against East Germany. In 1976 he was part of the Danish team which finished eighth in the Olympic tournament. He played all six matches and scored 32 goals. This made him the tournament topscorer. In total he would play 77 matches for the Danish national team, scoring 203 goals.

== Athletics ==
In athletics Larsen was a member of Aalborg Atletik Klub. In 1973 he and the club won European junior championship bronze medals. Larsen participated in javelin throw and threw 73.46 meters. He also participated in discus throw where he threw 45.38 meters.

He won the Danish championship in Javelin throw 5 times; in 1976, 1978, 1979, 1980 and 1981. He is the former Danish record holder in Javelin throw, when he threw 78.32 meters at Århus Stadion on 9 July 1975.

He also had various Danish youth records in hammer throw and pole vaulting.
