= Thomas Pazyj =

Danish handball player (1955-2016)

Personal information
- Nationality: Danish
- Born: 8 April 1955 (age 71) Copenhagen, Denmark
- Died: 27 November 2016 (aged 61)

Sport
- Sport: Handball
- Position: Right wing / Right back

Senior clubs
- Years: Team
- –: Saga
- –: HF Olympia
- –: IK Skovbakken
- –: Randers
National team
Years	Team	Apps	(Gls)
1973-1980	Denmark	87	(193)

Thomas Pazyj (8 April 1955 in Copenhagen – 27 November 2016) was a Danish handball player who competed in the 1976 Summer Olympics and in the 1980 Summer Olympics. He played regularly as a right wing, but could also play right back.

== Handball career ==
Pazyj started his senior career at the Copenhagen based club Saga. In the 1975-76 season, he scored the second most goals in the Danish 1st Division with 135 goals in 18 matches. He later played for HF Olympia in Helsingborg, Sweden, before returning to Denmark to play for IK Skovbakken. Lastly he played in Randers, where he played together with his brother, Lars Pazyj.

In 1976 at the age of 18 he was part of the Danish team which finished eighth in the Olympic tournament. He played all six matches and scored 18 goals. At the 1978 World Men's Handball Championship he finished fourth the Danish national team.

Four years later he finished ninth with the Danish team in the 1980 Olympic tournament. He played four matches and scored nine goals. He played in total 87 matches for the Danish national team, scoring 193 goals.

== Civil career ==
Pazyj studied Biology and geography. From 2010 he was the director at Regionshospitalet Randers. In 2016 he was forced to stop due to serious illness. He died later the same year.
