= Claude Viens =

Canadian handball player (born 1949)

Claude Viens (born April 29, 1949) is a former Canadian handball player who competed in the 1976 Summer Olympics.

Born in Saint-Jean-sur-Richelieu, Quebec, Viens was part of the Canadian handball team which finished eleventh in the 1976 Olympic tournament. He played all five matches and scored 13 goals.
