= Anatoly Yevtushenko =

Soviet handball player and coach (1934–2026)

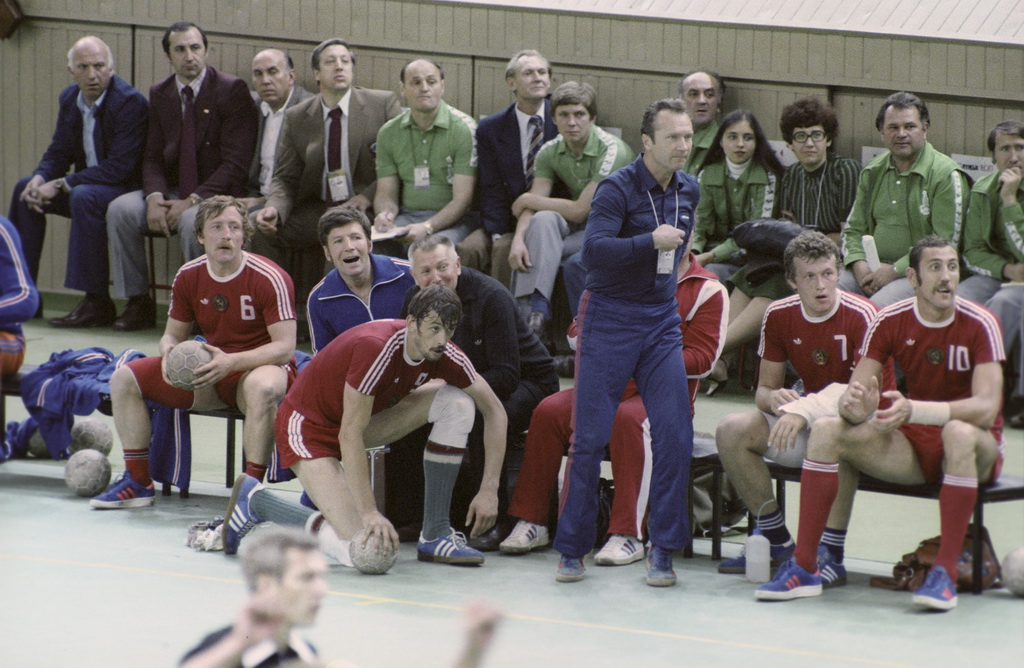
Yevtushenko (standing) at the Moscow Olympics in a 1980 match of the Soviet Union vs. Romania

Anatoly Nikolayevich Yevtushenko (Russian: Анатолий Николаевич Евтушенко; 1 September 1934 – 6 January 2026) was a Soviet handball player and coach who was an Honored Coach of the USSR.

== Biography ==
Yevtushenko was born in Horlivka on 1 September 1934. As a player he was champion of the USSR, and then double - silver medalist.

As a coach of NC MAI 6 times (1968, 1970, 1971, 1972, 1974, 1975) he led the club to the Soviet Championship, 7 times (1969, 1973, 1976, 1977, 1978, 1979, 1980) led the club to the silver, and once (1987) - a bronze.

In 1968, the student team of the USSR under the direction of Yevtushenko became world champion. In 1969-1990 he headed Soviet Union national handball team which became the Olympic champion in Montreal 1976 and Seoul 1988, the silver medalist at Moscow Olympics of 1980. The national team of the Soviet Union was World Cup 1982 and silver medalist 1978 World Men's Handball Championship and World Cup 1990.

After the collapse of the Soviet Union he worked in TSV Milbertshofen in Germany. He then became the head coach of the Kuwait men's national handball team, which he led the team to victory at the 1995 Asian Men's Handball Championship, which qualified the team for the 1996 Olympics. After the Olympics, he ceased to be the head coach of Kuwait. In Austria, he worked with Hypo Niederösterreich and women's national team.

In 1976, he received the title of Honored Coach of the USSR. At the same time he was awarded the gold medal of the sports committee of the Union "Best Coach in the Country".

Yevtushenko died on 6 January 2026, at the age of 91.
