= Ján Packa =

Slovak handball player (born 1952)

Ján Packa (born May 22, 1952 in Vlčany) is a former Czechoslovak/Slovak handball player who competed in the 1976 Summer Olympics.

In 1976 he was part of the Czechoslovak team which finished seventh in the Olympic tournament. He played all five matches as goalkeeper.

In January 2012 Packa signed a contract with Women's Handball International League club IUVENTA Michalovce.
