= Joachim Deckarm =

German handball player (born 1954)

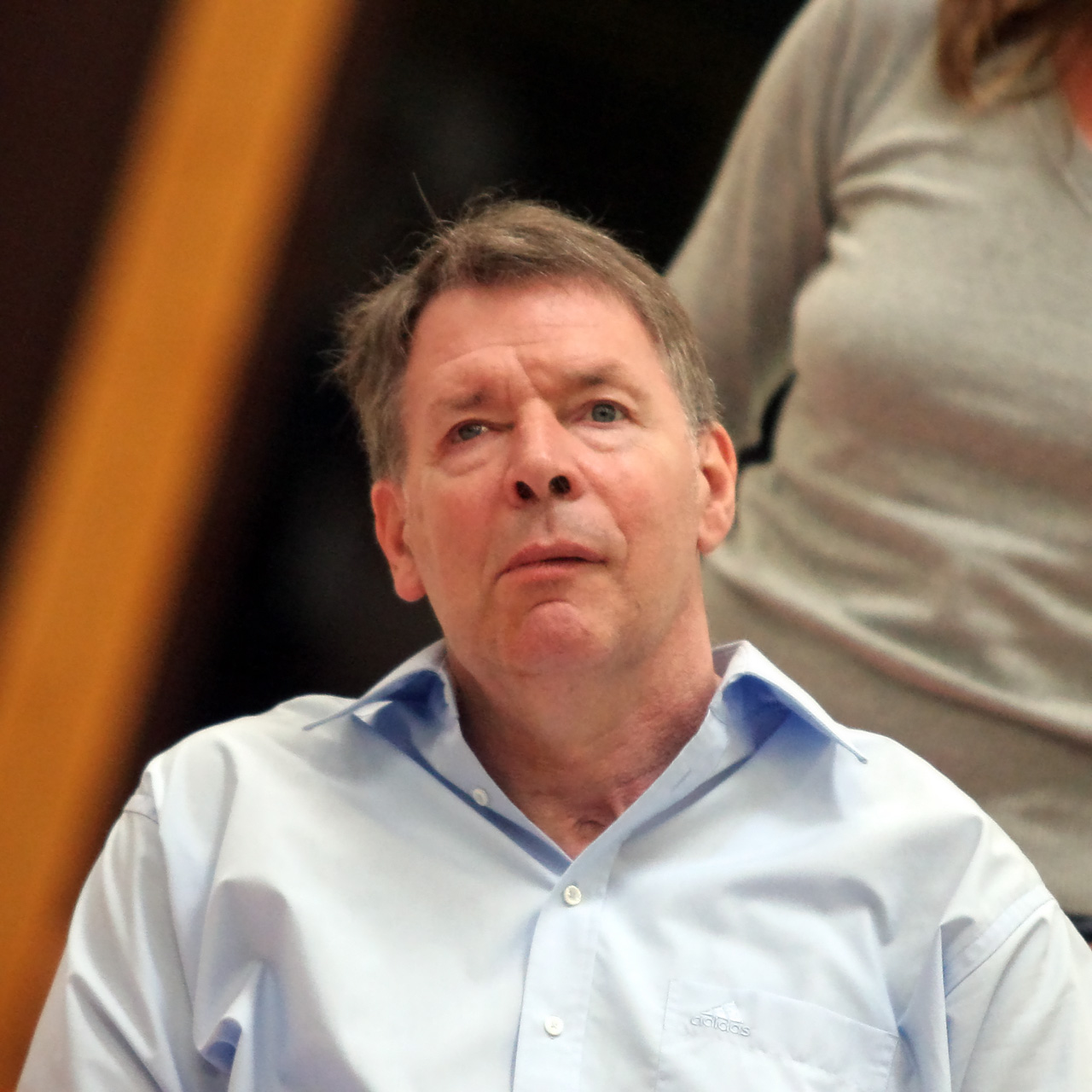
Joachim Deckarm

Joachim Deckarm (born 19 January 1954 in Saarbrücken) is a former West German handball player who played for VfL Gummersbach and the German national handball team. After surviving a horrific sports accident in 1979, he is physically handicapped.

With Gummersbach, Deckarm won three German championships (1974–76) and two European team championships (1974 and 1978). Deckarm was part of the West German team which finished fourth in the Olympic tournament and part of the successful 1978 team which won the first handball World Championship for West Germany. He played all six matches and scored 28 goals. During his active time Deckarm was considered to be the best player in the world.

== Accident and aftermath ==
Deckarm's career abruptly ended on 30 March 1979 during a Eurocup match versus the Hungarian side Tatabanya. On a fast break, Deckarm sprinted towards the goal with the ball in his hands, but collided with defending Tatabanya player Lajos Pánovics. Deckarm lost consciousness immediately, resulting in his head smashing against the ground. He suffered severe head trauma and was in a coma for 131 days. When he woke up, he was basically locked into his own body, unable to move a limb. Panovics was not responsible for the accident and suffered a serious hip injury that took six months to heal. Deckarm eventually fought his way back into life. He remained physically handicapped, but regained his mobility and is capable of doing short interviews. He lives in his native Saarbrücken in a home for handicapped people. Over the years, he developed a friendship with Pánovics who regularly visits him and his family in Germany. In 2004 the two received the award of the International Fair Play Committee.
