= Hiroshi Hanawa =

Japanese handball player (born 1950)

Hiroshi Hanawa (花輪 博, Hanawa Hiroshi, born 14 May 1950) is a Japanese former handball player who competed in the 1976 Summer Olympics.
