= Walter von Oepen =

German handball player (born 1954)

Walter von Oepen (born 20 March 1954) is a former West German handball player who competed in the 1976 Summer Olympics.

In 1976 he was part of the West German team which finished fourth in the Olympic tournament. He played one match.
