= Pierre Ferdais =

Canadian handball player

Personal information
- Born: September 2, 1948 Saint-Jean, Quebec, Canada
- Died: December 14, 2024 (aged 76) Longueuil, Quebec, Canada
- Education: Université de Sherbrooke
- Spouse: Chantal Ouellet
- Children: 2

Sport
- Country: Canada
- Sport: Handball

Pierre Ferdais (September 2, 1948 – December 14, 2024) was a Canadian handball player.

== Life and career ==
Ferdais was born in Saint-Jean, Quebec. He played college basketball at the Université de Sherbrooke.

Ferdais competed at the 1976 Summer Olympics, finishing in 11th place in the men's handball event. After competing at the Olympics, he served as coach of the Quebec men's senior provincial handball team in 1978.

== Death ==
Ferdais died on December 14, 2024, in Longueuil, Quebec, at the age of 76.
