= Pavel Mikeš =

Czech handball player

Personal information
- Nationality: Czech
- Born: 29 July 1950 (age 76) Písek, Czechoslovakia
- Height: 182 cm (72 in)

Sport
- Sport: Handball
National team
- Years: Team
- –: Czechoslovakia
Medal record
Men's Handball
| Silver medal – second place | 1972 Munich | Team competition |

Pavel Mikeš (born 27 July 1950) is a Czech handball player who competed in the 1972 Summer Olympics and in the 1976 Summer Olympics. He was part of the Czechoslovak team which won the silver medal at the Munich Games. He played all six matches and scored seven goals. Four years later he was a member of the Czechoslovak team which finished seventh. He played all five matches and scored 25 goals.
