= Anders Dahl-Nielsen =

Danish handball player (born 1951)

Personal information
- Nationality: Danish
- Born: 27 January 1951 (age 75) Aarhus, Denmark

Sport
- Sport: Handball
- Current club: Retired as player

Senior clubs
- Years: Team
- –1971: Vejle Idrætsforening
- 1971–1974: Tarup-Paarup IF
- 1974–1980: Fredericia KFUM
- 1980: Ribe HK (as Player-coach)
National team
Years	Team	Apps	(Gls)
1973–1984	Denmark	209	(610)

Teams managed
- –: Ribe HK
- 1987–1992: Denmark national team
- 1993–1998: SG Flensburg-Handewitt (Germany)
- 1998–2004: Skjern Håndbold

Anders Dahl-Nielsen (born 27 January 1951) is a Danish former handball player and coach. He competed in three olympics; the 1976 Summer Olympics, in the 1980 Summer Olympics, and in the 1984 Summer Olympics. At the height of his career he was regarded as one of the best handball players of his time. In 1977 he was awarded the best male player of the year in the Danish League.

== Career ==
He started at Vejle Idrætsforening in the 2. division where he debuted at the age of 17, before he moved on to Tarup-Paarup IF and later Fredericia KFUM. With Fredericia KFUM he won the Danish Men's Handball League in five times in a row in 1975, 1976, 1977, 1978 and 1979. In 1976 he reached the final of the EHF Cup with the club, but lost to Borac Banja Luka in the final. In 1977 he was named Danish player of the year.

In 1976 he was part of the Danish team which finished eighth in the Olympic tournament. He played all six matches and scored 22 goals. Four years later he finished ninth with the Danish team in the 1980 Olympic tournament. He played all six matches and scored twenty goals. In 1984 he was a member of the Danish team which finished fourth in the Olympic tournament. He played all six matches and scored eight goals.

== Coaching career ==
In 1980 he started his coaching career at Ribe HK as a player-coach, where he got them promoted to the Danish 1st division. From 1987 to 1992 he was the coach of the Denmark men's national handball team. After his national coach tenure he moved on to the recently formed German club SG Flensburg-Handewitt where he won the EHF European League in 1997. He was there for 5 years before returning to Denmark to coach Skjern Håndbold. Here he won the club's first ever Danish Men's Handball League in 1999, as well as the EHF European Cup in 2001/2002 and 2002/2003.
