= William Johnson (handballer) =

American handball player

Bill Johnson
Personal information
- Full name: William Johnson
- Nationality: United States
- Born: February 3, 1953 (age 73) New York City
- Height: 6 ft (1.8 m)

Sport
- Sport: Handball

Youth career
- Years: Team
- 1972 - ?: Adelphi University
Title
- 1973: Men's Open Division
- 1974: Men's Open Division
- Basketball career

Career information
- High school: Ramapo High School (New York)

Career highlights
- 2 × All County honorable mention

William Johnson (born February 3, 1953) is an American former handball player who competed in the 1976 Summer Olympics.

== Life ==
He was born in New York City. He played basketball for the Ramapo High School (New York). He received a BS in Physical Education from the Adelphi University.

== Handball ==
In January 1972 he was approached by the Adelphi handball coach and former national team player Laszlo Jurak to play handball because he is left-handed. He thought first Jurak is talking about American handball. He declined the offered first but later joined the team. In his first game he scored two goals. As sophomore and junior he won the Men's Open Division (Adults Championship) with Adelphi.

In 1976 he was part of the American team which finished tenth in the Olympic tournament. He played two matches and scored one goal.
