= Maciej Fortuna =

Polish musician

Maciej Fortuna is a Polish jazz trumpet player, composer and musical educator. He runs the Fortuna Music record label. Jerzy Milian dedicated his composition "Music For Mr. Fortuna" to Maciej Fortuna.

== Education ==
Maciej graduated from the University of Poznan Law School in 2007 and obtained a master's degree with first class honours from the Academy of Music in Wroclaw, Piotr Wojtasik jazz trumpet class (2010). In 2012, he obtained a doctor's degree in performing arts at The Academy of Music in Poznań.

== Performances ==
He has played with artists from Poland, Europe and the USA. He has won prizes as a soloist and with his bands.

Maciej Fortuna is also a session musician for radio or television. He is a lecturer in the Academy of Music in Poznan (Poland), in the jazz trumpet class.

== Group membership ==
As a leader:

- Maciej Fortuna Solo
- Maciej Fortuna Trio
- Maciej Fortuna Quartet
- Maciej Fortuna Quintet

As co-leader:

- An On Bast/Maciej Fortuna
- Mack Goldsbury Quartet feat. Maciej Fortuna
- Maciej Fortuna and Stefan Weeke Project

Member of groups:

- Piotr Lemańczyk Quartet, featuring David Kikoski
- Mack Goldsbury and The Polish Connection
- Ernst Bier and Mack Goldsbury Group
- Switch On Quintet

== Awards ==
- Grand Prix, TVP KULTURA prize, TVP President Prize during Young Talent Competition ‘Niemen Non Stop’ in Słupsk (July 2008)
- First prize during Kodolanyi Jazz Competition (July 2008) with Switch On Quintet
- Finalist of Junior Jazz in Usti Nad Laba (2008) with the same group
- finalist of the 1st International Tarnow Jazz Contest (2008) with Maciej Fortuna Quintet
- Second prize during Jazz Juniors Competition (2008) with Maciej Fortuna Quintet
- Best soloist prize during Bydgoszcz Big Band Festiwal 2008 and Baszta Jazz Festiwal 2008
- Honourable in the same category during the Big Band Festival in Nowy Tomysl (2008)

== Discography ==
=== Maciej Fortuna/ Krzysztof Dys ===
- Maciejewski - Variations DUX 1151 (2014)

=== Fortuna / Goldsbury / Minchello / Grassi ===
- The Last of The Beboppers Fortuna Music FM 018 (2014)

=== Maciej Fortuna Ethno Quartet ===
- Zakhaar Fortuna Music FM 016 (2014)

=== Fortuna / Fortuna ===
- Music for Trumpet and Pipe Organ Fortuna Music FM 015 (2014)

=== Riboflavin ===
- Full Circle Riboflavin' Inc. (2014)

=== Mack Goldsbury Quartet feat. Maciej Fortuna ===
- Active Rush Fortuna Music FM 014 (2013)

=== Maciej Fortuna Acoustic Quartet ===
- Jazz From Poland VOL. 1 Fortuna Music FM 012 (2013)

=== Fortuna / Dys ===
- Tropy Fortuna Music FM 011 (2013)

=== Maciej Fortuna Trio ===
- At Home Fortuna Music FM 008 (2013)
- Sahjia Fortuna Music FM 007 (2012)
- Solar Ring Fortuna Music FM 005 (2012)
- Jazz Fortuna Music FM 021 (2016)

=== An On Bast & Maciej Fortuna ===
- Electroacoustic Transcription of Film Music by Krzysztof Penderecki Fortuna Music FM013 (2013)
- Live Fortuna Music FM 010 (2013)
- 1 Fortuna Music FM 006 (2012)

=== Mack Goldsbury Quartet featuring Maciej Fortuna ===
- Live at CoCo's Cadence Jazz Records (2012)

=== Piotr Lemańczyk Quartet feat. David Kikoski ===
- Guru Soliton (2012)

=== Switch On Quintet ===
- Our Car Will Never Stop Fortuna Music FM 004 (2011)

=== Mack Goldsbury and The Polish Connection featuring Reggie Moore ===
- Salt Miners Blues Fortuna Music FM 003 (2011)

=== Ernst Bier and Mack Goldsbury Group ===
- Artesia Sunrise Konnex (2010)

=== Maciej Fortuna Quartet ===
- Lost Keys Fortuna Music FM 002 (2010)

=== Maciej Fortuna and Stefan Weeke Project ===
- In The Small Hours Fortuna Music FM 001 (2009)

=== Maciej Fortuna International Quartet ===
- Zośka Fortuna Music FM 020 (2016)

=== Maciej Fortuna Quartet with Strings ===
- Jerzy Milian – Music For Mr. Fortuna Jazz Poznan Association SJP 002 (2016)
