= Lars Bock =

Danish handball player (born 1955)

Personal information
- Nationality: Danish
- Born: 2 January 1955 (age 71) Frederiksberg, Denmark
- Height: 190 cm (75 in)

Sport
- Sport: Handball
- Position: Left back
- Current club: Retired

Senior clubs
- Years: Team
- –1974: Frederiksberg IF
- 1974: THW Kiel (Germany)
- 1974–1975: Frederiksberg IF
- 1975–1978: Olympia Helsingborg (Sweden)
- 1978–: Holte IF
National team
Years	Team	Apps	(Gls)
1973–1978	Denmark	79	(178)

Lars Bock (born 2 January 1955) is a Danish former handball player who competed in the 1976 Summer Olympics.

He played the main part of his club handball with Olympia Helsingborg in Sweden. In 1976 he was part of the Denmark men's national handball team which finished eighth in the Olympic tournament. He played all six matches and scored eight goals.
