= Jürgen Hahn =

German handball player (born 1950)

Personal information
- Nationality: German
- Born: 23 September 1950 (age 76) Haßloch, Germany
- Height: 183 cm (72 in)

Sport
- Sport: Handball
- Current club: Retired

Senior clubs
- Years: Team
- –: SG Leutershausen
National team
Years	Team	Apps	(Gls)
–	Germany	43	(115)

Jürgen Hahn (born 23 September 1950) is a West German former handball player and coach. He competed in the 1976 Summer Olympics.

In 1976 he was part of the West German team which finished fourth in the Olympic tournament. He played all six matches and scored 14 goals.
