= Henrik Jacobsgaard =

Danish handball player (born 1952)

Personal information
- Nationality: Danish
- Born: 9 March 1952 (age 74) Copenhagen, Denmark

Sport
- Sport: Handball

Senior clubs
- Years: Team
- –: SAGA
National team
Years	Team	Apps	(Gls)
1975-1978	Denmark	52	(85)

Henrik Jacobsgaard (born March 9, 1952) is a Danish former handball player who competed in the 1976 Summer Olympics. He debuted for the Danish national team in December 1975 against Iceland. In 1976 he was part of the Danish team which finished eighth in the Olympic tournament. He played five matches and scored three goals.

He played his club handball with SAGA (Samvirkets Atletik- og Gymnastik Afdeling). In 1976 he was named the Danish League player of the year.
