= Manfred Hofmann =

German handball player (born 1948)

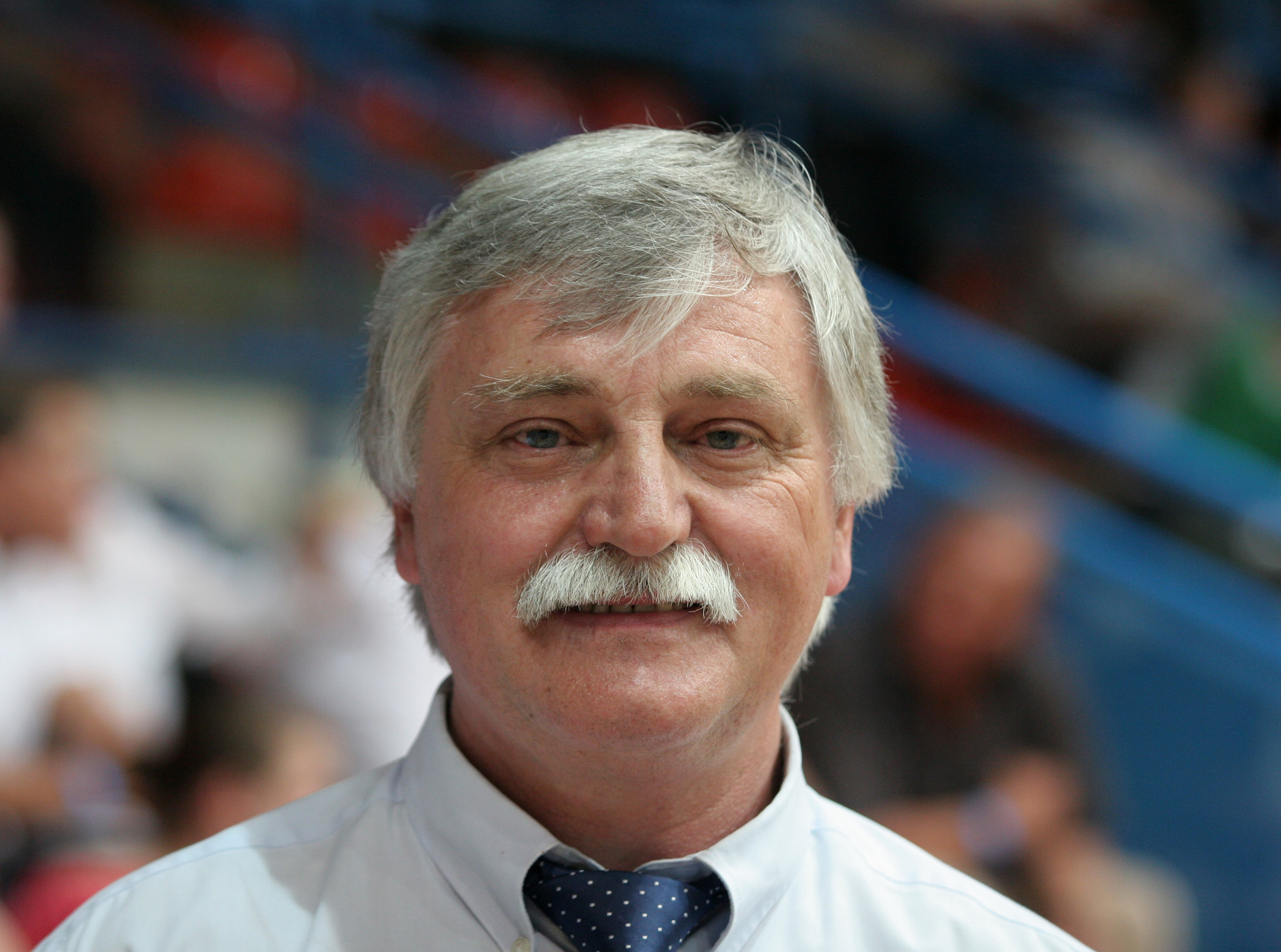
Manfred Hofmann

Manfred Hofmann (born 30 January 1948 in Großwallstadt) is a former West German handball player who competed in the 1976 Summer Olympics.

In 1976 he was part of the West German team which finished fourth in the Olympic tournament. He played five matches as goalkeeper.
