= Ryszard Przybysz =

Polish handball player (1950–2002)

Olympic medal record

Men's Handball
Bronze medal – third place	1976 Montreal	Team

Ryszard Stanisław Przybysz (8 January 1950 – 23 February 2002) was a Polish handball player who competed in the 1976 Summer Olympics.

He was born in Koło and died in Łódź.

In 1976, he won the bronze medal with the Polish team. He played all five matches and scored 13 goals.
