= Jiří Hanzl =

Czech handball player

Jiří Hanzl (born 4 August 1951 in Benešov) is a Czech former handball player who competed for Czechoslovakia in the 1976 Summer Olympics.

In 1976 he was part of the Czechoslovak team which finished seventh in the Olympic tournament. He played all five matches and scored 18 goals.
