= Kozo Matsubara =

Japanese handball player (born 1949)

Kozo Matsubara (松原 光三, Matsubara Kōzō; born December 25, 1949) is a former Japanese handball player who competed in the 1976 Summer Olympics.
