= Károly Vass =

Hungarian handball player (1944–2021)

Károly Vass (14 June 1944 – 6 September 2021) was a Hungarian handball player who competed in the 1972 Summer Olympics and in the 1976 Summer Olympics.

In 1972 he was part of the Hungarian team which finished eighth in the Olympic tournament. He played all six matches and scored eleven goals. Four years later he finished sixth with the Hungarian team in the 1976 Olympic tournament. He played all five matches and scored 18 goals.

He participated in two World Championships in 1974 and 1982, achieving a seventh and a ninth place, respectively.

== Awards ==
- Hungarian Handballer of the Year: 1974
