= Jan Gmyrek =

Polish handball player (born 1951)

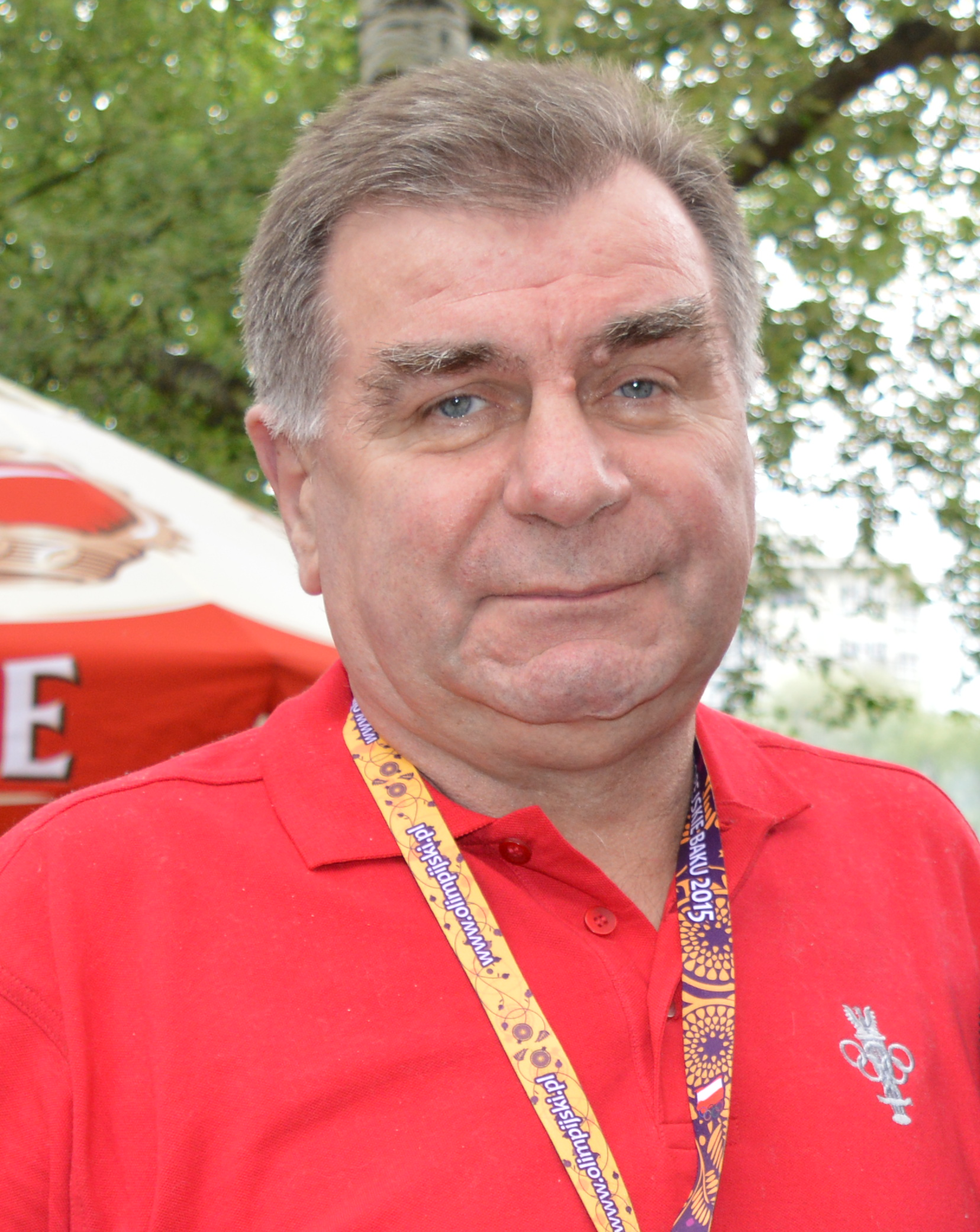

Personal information
- Nationality: Polish
- Born: 2 March 1951 (age 75) Kraków, Poland
- Height: 1.78 m (5 ft 10 in)

Sport
- Sport: Handball
- Position: Centre back

Senior clubs
- Years: Team
- 1964–1969: AZS Kraków
- 1969–1976: FKS Stal Mielec
- 1976–1980: Hutnik Kraków
- 1980–1985: UHC Eggenburg
National team
Years	Team	Apps	(Gls)
1970–1979	Poland	176	(332)
Medal record
Olympic Games
Men's Handball
Bronze medal – third place	1976 Montreal	Team

Jan Wojciech Gmyrek (born 2 March 1951) is a former Polish handball player who competed in the 1972 Summer Olympics and in the 1976 Summer Olympics.

In 1972 he was part of the Polish team which finished tenth. Four years later he won the bronze medal with the Polish team.
