= Wolfgang Blankenau =

Canadian handball player (born 1955)

Wolfgang Blankenau (born April 28, 1955, in Edmonton) is a Canadian former handball player who competed in the 1976 Summer Olympics.

He was part of the Canadian handball team, which finished eleventh in the 1976 Olympic tournament. He played all five matches and scored twelve goals.
