= Bernhard Busch =

German handball player (born 1951)

Bernhard Busch (born November 3, 1951) is a former West German handball player who competed in the 1976 Summer Olympics.

In 1976 he was part of the West German team which finished fourth in the Olympic tournament. He played all six matches and scored six goals.
