= Patrick O'Neill (handballer) =

American handball player (born 1956)

Personal information
- Born: March 20, 1956 (age 70)
- Nationality: United States

Patrick O'Neill (born March 20, 1956, in Stamford, Connecticut) is an American former handball player who competed in the 1976 Summer Olympics.

In 1976 O'Neill was part of the American team which finished tenth in the Olympic tournament. He played two matches.
