= Hugues de Roussan =

Canadian handball player (born 1955)

Hugues de Roussan (born March 23, 1955) is a former Canadian handball player who competed in the 1976 Summer Olympics.

Born in Montreal, he was part of the Canadian handball team which finished eleventh in the 1976 Olympic tournament. He played all five matches and scored eleven goals.
