= Valeri Gassy =

Soviet handball player (1949–2004)

Olympic medal record

Representing Soviet Union

Men's Handball

Olympic Games
Gold medal – first place	1976 Montreal	Team

World Championship
Silver medal – second place	1978 Denmark	Team

Valeri Dmitriyevich Gassy (Russian: Валерий Дмитриевич Гассий) (April 22, 1949, Ukraine – February 1, 2004) was a Soviet/Ukraine handball player who competed in the 1972 Olympics and in the 1976 Olympics. He was born in Kolomyia (today in Ukraine).

He played at Burevestnik Krasnodar and at CSKA Moscow (1973–1974). In 1972 he was part of the Soviet team which finished fifth. He played all six matches and scored twelve goals.

Four years later he won the gold medal with the Soviet team. He played five matches including the final and scored 25 goals. At the 1978 World Championship he also won a silver medal.
