= Józef Ćwierczakiewicz =

Polish journalist

- Born: 1822; Warsaw, Congress Poland, Russian Empire
- Died: September 12, 1869; Geneva, Switzerland
- Other names: Józef Ćwierciakiewicz, Joseph Card
- Occupations: Journalist, activist
- Era: 19th century
- Known for: Agent of the Central National Committee; participant in the January Uprising; immigration activism

Józef Ćwierczakiewicz, Józef Ćwierciakiewicz (1822, Warsaw – 12 September 1869 in Geneva), also known as Joseph Card, was a Polish journalist, representative of Central National Committee in West Prussia (Pomerania) in 1861-1863, and agent of Komitet Centralny Narodowy in England in 1862-1863. After the failure of the January Uprising, he moved to Geneva and became active in the League of Peace and Freedom. He also became an immigration activist in France, Great Britain and Switzerland.
