= Alfred Kałuziński =

Polish handball player (1952–1997)

Personal information
- Nationality: Polish
- Born: 21 December 1952 Kraków, Poland
- Died: 4 September 1997 (aged 44) Klimkówka, Poland
- Height: 1.90 m (6 ft 3 in)

Sport
- Sport: Handball
- Position: Centre back

Senior clubs
- Years: Team
- 1966–1971: Hutnik Kraków
- 1971–1973: Wawel Kraków
- 1973–1982: Hutnik Kraków
- 1982–1984: Tuspo Nürnberg
- 1984–1985: TSV 1860 Ansbach
- 1985–1991: HaSpo Bayreuth
National team
Years	Team	Apps	(Gls)
1973–1982	Poland	204	(620)
Medal record
Olympic Games
Men's Handball
Bronze medal – third place	1976 Montreal	Team
World Championship
Bronze medal – third place	1982 West Germany

Alfred Józef Kałuziński (21 December 1952 – 4 September 1997) is a former Polish handball player who competed in the 1976 Summer Olympics and in the 1980 Summer Olympics.

In 1976 he won the bronze medal with the Polish team. Four years later he was part of the Polish team which finished seventh.
