= Satoshi Kikuchi =

Japanese handball player (born 1952)

Satoshi Kikuchi (菊池 悟, Kikuchi Satoshi; 27 April 1952 – 10 March 2019) was a Japanese handball player who competed in the 1976 Summer Olympics.
