= Štefan Katušák =

Slovak handball player (born 1949)

Štefan Katušák (born 26 October 1949 in Poproč) is a former Czechoslovak/Slovak handball player who competed in the 1976 Summer Olympics.

In 1976 he was a squad member of the Czechoslovak team which finished seventh in the Olympic tournament. In years 2008 and 2009 he won the Slovak national title (part of WHIL) as the coach of the women's team of ŠKP Bratislava.
