= Zdenko Zorko =

Croatian handball player (born 1950)

Personal information
- Full name: Zdenko Zorko
- Nationality: Croatian
- Born: 18 August 1950 (age 76) Zagreb, SFR Yugoslavia
- Height: 1.87 m (6 ft 2 in)

Sport
- Sport: Handball
- Position: Goalkeeper
- Number: 1

Youth career
- Years: Team
- 1959–1964: NK Dinamo Zagreb
- 1965–1967: RK Zagreb

Senior clubs
- Years: Team
- 1967–1972: RK Zagreb
- 1972–1976: RK Medveščak
- 1976–1978: RK Aero-Celje
- 1978–1983: RK Zagreb
National team
Years	Team	Apps
1972–1976	Yugoslavia	82

Teams managed
- 1985–1988: RK Zagreb-Chromos
- 1988–1989: RK Borac (Zagreb)
- 1989–1990: RK Aero-Celje
- 1990–1992: Industrogradnja
- 1991–2008: Croatia(GK coach)
- 1993–1997: RK Lokomotiva Zagreb
- 1999–2000: RK Badel 1862 Zagreb
- 2000–2001: Pfadi Winterthur
- 2001–2011: Gummersbach (GK coach)
- 2012–present: RK Lokomotiva (GK coach)
- 2011–2013: Croatia(GK coach)
Medal record
Representing Yugoslavia
Men's Handball
Olympic Games
Gold medal – first place	1972 München	Team
World Championship
Bronze medal – third place	1974 East Germany	Team
Mediterranean Games
Gold medal – first place	1975 Algeria	Team
Representing Croatia
Olympic Games
Gold medal – first place	1996 Atlanta	GK coach
Gold medal – first place	2004 Athens	GK coach
Bronze medal – third place	2012 London	GK coach
World Championship
Silver medal – second place	1995 Island	GK coach
Gold medal – first place	2003 Portugal	GK coach
Silver medal – second place	2005 Tunis	GK coach
European Championship
Bronze medal – third place	1994 Portugal	GK coach
Bronze medal – third place	2008 Norway	GK coach
Mediterranean Games
Gold medal – first place	1993 Languedoc-Roussillon	GK coach
Gold medal – first place	2001 Tunis	GK coach

Zdenko Zorko (born 18 August 1950) is a Croatian former handball player who competed in the 1972 Summer Olympics and in the 1976 Summer Olympics for Yugoslavia.

In his youth Zdenko Zorko played football in NK Dinamo Zagreb before playing handball.

In 1972 he was part of the Yugoslav team which won the gold medal at the Munich Games. He played one match as goalkeeper.

Four years later he was a member of the Yugoslav team which finished fifth in the Olympic tournament. He played four matches as goalkeeper.

== Honours ==
Player
Zagreb

- Yugoslav Second League – (North) (1): 1978–79
- Yugoslav Second League – (West) (1): 1981–82

Coach
Zagreb

- Yugoslav Second League – (North) (1): 1987–88
- Croatian Premier Handball League (1): 1999–00
- Croatian Cup (1): 2000

Individual

- Franjo Bučar State Award for Sport – 2012
