= Kenji Fujinaka =

Japanese handball player (born 1947)

Kenji Fujinaka (藤中 憲二, Fujinaka Kenji) born 28 November 1947 is a Japanese former handball player who competed in the 1976 Summer Olympics.
