= Søren Andersen (handballer) =

Danish handball player (born 1948)

Personal information
- Nationality: Danish
- Born: 23 March 1948 (age 78) Allerslev, Vordingborg Denmark
- Height: 189 cm (74 in)

Sport
- Sport: Handball
- Position: Pivot

Senior clubs
- Years: Team
- 1968: Næstved IF
- 1975-1978: Fredericia KFUM
National team
| Years | Team | Apps | (Gls) |
| 1968-1978 | Denmark | 60 | (93) |

Søren Andersen (born March 23, 1948) is a Danish former handball player who competed in the 1976 Summer Olympics. He played as a pivot. He was known as a good defensive player with a good shot.

== Club career ==
He played his club handball with Fredericia KFUM, where he joined from Næstved IF in 1970. Simultaneously he worked as a clerk at Fredericia Municipality. Fredericia KFUM was at the time one of the best teams in the country. He won 5 Danish championships on a row with the club in the 1970's and every Danish Cup between 1971 and 1977 except for 1975. In 1976 he reached the final of the EHF Cup with the club, but lost to Borac Banja Luka in the final.

== National team ==
He debuted for the Danish national team on July 21st, 1968 against Hungary while playing for Næstved.

In 1976 he was part of the Denmark team which finished eighth in the Olympic tournament. He played four matches and scored eleven goals.

After his playing career he has worked as a Municipal clerk in Middelfart Municipality.
