= Mohamed Abdel Khaled =

Tunisian handball player

Personal information
- Nationality: Tunisian
- Born: 22 November 1951 (age 73)
- Height: 1.83 m (6 ft 0 in)
- Weight: 76 kg (168 lb)

Sport
- Sport: Handball

Mohamed Abdel Khaled (born 22 November 1951) is a Tunisian handball player. He competed in the 1976 Summer Olympics.
