= Habib Kheder =

Tunisian handball player

Personal information
- Nationality: Tunisian
- Born: 17 August 1954 (age 70)

Sport
- Sport: Handball

Habib Kheder (born 17 August 1954) is a Tunisian handball player. He competed in the men's tournament at the 1976 Summer Olympics.
