= Abderraouf Ben Samir =

Tunisian handball player

Personal information
- Nationality: Tunisian
- Born: 29 December 1953 (age 71)

Sport
- Sport: Handball

Abderraouf Ben Samir (born 29 December 1953) is a Tunisian handball player. He competed at the 1972 Summer Olympics and the 1976 Summer Olympics.
