= Raouf Chabchoub =

Tunisian handball player

Personal information
- Nationality: Tunisian
- Born: 15 May 1954 (age 70)

Sport
- Sport: Handball

Raouf Chabchoub (born 15 May 1954) is a Tunisian handball player. He competed in the men's tournament at the 1976 Summer Olympics.
