= Masaki Shibata =

Japanese handball player (born 1953)

Masaki Shibata (柴田 正章, Shibata Masaki; born 12 April 1953) is a Japanese former handball player who competed in the 1976 Summer Olympics.
