= Moncef Besbes =

Tunisian handball player

Personal information
- Nationality: Tunisian
- Born: 11 November 1949
- Died: 23 October 2021 (aged 71)

Sport
- Sport: Handball

Moncef Besbes (11 November 1949 – 23 October 2021) was a Tunisian handball player. He competed at the 1972 Summer Olympics and the 1976 Summer Olympics.
