= Slaheddine Deguechi =

Tunisian handball player

Personal information
- Nationality: Tunisian
- Born: 20 October 1954 (age 72)

Sport
- Sport: Handball

Slaheddine Deguechi (born 20 October 1954) is a Tunisian handball player. He competed in the men's tournament at the 1976 Summer Olympics.
