= Pierre Désormeaux =

Canadian handball player (born 1952)

Pierre Désormeaux (born September 16, 1952) is a Canadian former handball player who competed in the 1976 Summer Olympics. He was part of the Canadian handball team which finished eleventh in the 1976 Olympic tournament. He played all five matches and scored twelve goals. In April 2000, he was chosen the Canadian Handball Century's Player.

Désormeaux was born in Montreal.
