= Khaled Achour =

Tunisian handball player

Personal information
- Nationality: Tunisian
- Born: 11 August 1955 (age 69)
- Height: 1.77 m (5 ft 10 in)
- Weight: 82 kg (181 lb)

Sport
- Sport: Handball

Khaled Achour (born 11 August 1955) is a Tunisian handball player. He competed in the 1976 Summer Olympics.
