= Lotfi Rebai =

Tunisian handball player

Personal information
- Nationality: Tunisian
- Born: 1 February 1954 (age 71)

Sport
- Sport: Handball

Lotfi Rebai (born 1 February 1954) is a Tunisian handball player. He competed in the men's tournament at the 1976 Summer Olympics.
