= Toyohiko Hozumi =

Japanese handball player (born 1952)

Toyohiko Hozumi (穂積 豊彦, Hozumi Toyohiko; born 26 March 1952) is a Japanese former handball player who competed in the 1976 Summer Olympics.
