= Jozef Dobrotka =

Slovak handball player (born 1952)

Jozef Dobrotka (born October 23, 1952) is a Slovak former handball player who competed for Czechoslovakia in the 1976 Summer Olympics.

He was born in Bojnice.

In 1976 he was part of the Czechoslovak team which finished seventh in the Olympic tournament. He played all five matches and scored nine goals.
