= Józef Fortuna =

Polish politician

Deputy of the IV Sejm
- In office 2004 – 2005
- Preceded by: Adam Bielan
- Constituency: 12 Chrzanów

Personal details
- Born: 11 September 1952 (age 73) Maków Podhalański, Polish People's Republic
- Party: Law and Justice

Józef Fortuna (born 11 September 1952 in Maków Podhalański) is a Polish politician, member of the Law and Justice party. He was appointed to the Sejm in 2004, replacing deputy Adam Bielan.
