= Ahmed Bechir Bel Hadj =

Tunisian handball player

Personal information
- Nationality: Tunisian
- Born: 13 March 1950 (age 76)

Sport
- Sport: Handball

Ahmed Bechir Bel Hadj (born 13 March 1950) is a Tunisian handball player. He competed at the 1972 Summer Olympics and the 1976 Summer Olympics.
