= Habib Ammar =

Tunisian handball player

Personal information
- Nationality: Tunisian
- Born: 15 November 1946 (age 78)

Sport
- Sport: Handball

Habib Ammar (born 15 November 1946) is a Tunisian handball player. He competed in the men's tournament at the 1976 Summer Olympics.
