= Jesper Petersen (handballer) =

Danish handball player (born 1953)

Jesper Petersen (born 18 December 1953) is a Danish former handball player who competed in the 1976 Summer Olympics.

He played his club handball with Fredericia KFUM. In 1976 he was part of the Denmark men's national handball team which finished eighth in the Olympic tournament. He played five matches and scored one goal.
