= Kurt Klühspies =

German handball player (born 1952)

Kurt Klühspies

Kurt Klühspies (born 4 February 1952 in Würzburg, Bavaria) is a former West German handball player who competed in the 1976 Summer Olympics.

In 1976 he was part of the West German team which finished fourth in the Olympic tournament. He played all six matches and scored 17 goals.
