= Water polo at the 1972 Summer Olympics – Men's team squads =

The following is the list of squads that took part in the men's water polo tournament at the 1972 Summer Olympics.

== Australia ==
The following players represented Australia:

- Michael Withers
- Tom Hoad
- David Woods
- Peter Montgomery
- Ian McLauchlain
- Robert Menzies
- David Neesham
- Les Nunn
- Nicky Barnes
- Leon Wiegard
- Bill Tilley

== Bulgaria ==
The following players represented Bulgaria:

- Biser Naumov
- Ivan Kovachev
- Aleksandar Shintser
- Toma Tomov
- Plamen Brankov
- Mladen Khristov
- Nedelcho Yordanov
- Vasil Tomov
- Andrey Konstantinov
- Matey Popov
- Lyubomir Runtov

== Canada ==
The following players represented Canada:

- William Van der Pol
- Alan Pyle
- Rick Pugliese
- Clifford Barry
- Donald Packer
- Stephen Hart
- Jack Gauldie
- Robert Thompson
- David Hart
- Gabor Csepregi
- Guy Leclerc

== Cuba ==
The following players represented Cuba:

- Oscar Periche
- David Rodríguez
- Jorge Rizo
- Guillermo Martínez Ginoris
- Orlando Cowley
- Eugenio Almenteros
- Carlos Sánchez
- Gerardo Rodríguez
- Osvaldo García
- Guillermo Cañete
- Jesús Pérez

== Greece ==
The following players represented Greece:

- Dimitrios Konstas
- Georgios Theodorakopoulos
- Evangelos Voultsos
- Kyriakos Iosifidis
- Dimitrios Kougevetopoulos
- Periklis Damaskos
- Thomas Karalogos
- Ioannis Karalogos
- Efstathios Sarantos
- Ioannis Palios
- Panagiotis Mikhalos

== Hungary ==
The following players represented Hungary:

- Endre Molnár
- Tibor Cservenyák
- András Bodnár
- István Görgényi
- Zoltán Kásás
- Tamás Faragó
- László Sárosi
- István Szivós Jr.
- István Magas
- Dénes Pócsik
- Ferenc Konrád

== Italy ==
The following players represented Italy:

- Alberto Alberani Samaritani
- Eraldo Pizzo
- Roldano Simeoni
- Mario Cevasco
- Alessandro Ghibellini
- Gianni De Magistris
- Guglielmo Marsili
- Silvio Baracchini
- Franco Lavoratori
- Sante Marsili
- Ferdinando Lignano

== Japan ==
The following players represented Japan:

- Yukiharu Oshita
- Hirokatsu Kuwayama
- Toshio Takahashi
- Shuzo Yajima
- Hiroshi Hashimoto
- Koji Nakano
- Naoto Minegishi
- Tatsuo Jihira
- Takashi Kimura
- Yoshihiro Yasumi
- Toru Arase

== Mexico ==
The following players represented Mexico:

- Daniel Gómez
- Francisco García
- Maximiliano Aguilar
- Raúl Alanis
- Arturo Valencia
- Juan Manuel García
- Armando Fernández
- Alfredo Sauza
- Ricardo Chapa
- Víctor García
- Rafael Azpeitia

== Netherlands ==
The following players represented the Netherlands:

- Evert Kroon
- Hans Wouda
- Jan Evert Veer
- Hans Hoogveld
- Wim Hermsen
- Hans Parrel
- Ton Schmidt
- Mart Bras
- Ton Buunk
- Gijze Stroboer
- Wim van de Schilde

== Romania ==
The following players represented Romania:

- Șerban Huber
- Bogdan Mihăilescu
- Gheorghe Zamfirescu
- Gruia Novac
- Dinu Popescu
- Claudiu Rusu
- Iosif Culineac
- Cornel Rusu
- Viorel Rus
- Radu Lazăr
- Cornel Frăţilă

== Soviet Union ==
The following players represented the Soviet Union:

- Vadim Gulyayev
- Anatoly Akimov
- Aleksandr Dreval
- Aleksandr Dolgushin
- Vladimir Zhmudsky
- Aleksandr Kabanov
- Oleksiy Barkalov
- Aleksandr Shidlovsky
- Nikolay Melnikov
- Leonid Osipov
- Viacheslav Sobchenko

== Spain ==
The following players represented Spain:

- Salvador Franch
- Juan Rubio
- Juan Sans
- Juan Jané
- Alfonso Cánovas
- Gabriel Soler
- Poncio Puigdevall
- Enrique Guardia
- José Padrós
- Gaspar Ventura
- Luis Bestit

== United States ==
The following players represented the United States:

- James Slatton
- Stan Cole
- Russ Webb
- Barry Weitzenberg
- Gary Sheerer
- Bruce Bradley
- Peter Asch
- Jim Ferguson
- Steve Barnett
- John Parker
- Eric Lindroth

== West Germany ==
The following players represented West Germany:

- Gerd Olbert
- Hermann Haverkamp
- Peter Teicher
- Kurt Küpper
- Günter Wolf
- Ingulf Nossek
- Ludger Weeke
- Kurt Schuhmann
- Jürgen Stiefel
- Hans Simon
- Hans Hoffmeister

== Yugoslavia ==
The following players represented Yugoslavia:

- Karlo Stipanić
- Ratko Rudić
- Ozren Bonačić
- Uroš Marović
- Ronald Lopatni
- Zoran Janković
- Siniša Belamarić
- Dušan Antunović
- Đorđe Perišić
- Mirko Sandić
- Miloš Marković
