= Bulgaria at the 1972 Summer Olympics =

- IOC code: BUL
- NOC: Bulgarian Olympic Committee

in Munich
- Competitors: 130 (106 men and 24 women) in 15 sports
- Flag bearer: Dimitar Zlatanov
- Medals Ranked 9th: Gold 6 Silver 10 Bronze 5 Total 21

Summer Olympics appearances (overview)
- 1896; 1900–1920; 1924; 1928; 1932; 1936; 1948; 1952; 1956; 1960; 1964; 1968; 1972; 1976; 1980; 1984; 1988; 1992; 1996; 2000; 2004; 2008; 2012; 2016; 2020; 2024

Bulgaria competed at the 1972 Summer Olympics in Munich, West Germany. 130 competitors, 106 men and 24 women, took part in 92 events in 15 sports.

== Medalists ==
Medal	Name	Sport	Event	Date
Gold	Norair Nurikyan	Weightlifting	Men's featherweight	29 August
Gold	Yordan Bikov	Weightlifting	Men's middleweight	31 August
Gold	Andon Nikolov	Weightlifting	Men's middle-heavyweight	3 September
Gold	Georgi Kostadinov	Boxing	Men's flyweight	10 September
Gold	Petar Kirov	Wrestling	Men's Greco-Roman flyweight	10 September
Gold	Georgi Markov	Wrestling	Men's Greco-Roman featherweight	10 September
Silver	Mladen Kutchev	Weightlifting	Men's lightweight	30 August
Silver	Diana Yorgova	Athletics	Women's long jump	31 August
Silver	Ognian Nikolov	Wrestling	Men's freestyle light-flyweight	31 August
Silver	Osman Duraliev	Wrestling	Men's freestyle super heavyweight	31 August
Silver	Atanas Shopov	Weightlifting	Men's middle-heavyweight	3 September
Silver	Yordanka Blagoeva	Athletics	Women's high jump	4 September
Silver	Aleksandar Kraitchev	Weightlifting	Men's heavyweight	4 September
Silver	Angel Angelov	Boxing	Men's light welterweight	10 September
Silver	Stoyan Apostolov	Wrestling	Men's Greco-Roman lightweight	10 September
Silver	Aleksandr Tomov	Wrestling	Men's Greco-Roman super heavyweight	10 September
Bronze	Ivan Krastev	Wrestling	Men's freestyle featherweight	31 August
Bronze	Ivanka Khristova	Athletics	Women's Shot Put	7 September
Bronze	Fedia Damianov & Ivan Burtchin	Canoe / Kayak	Men's Flatwater C-2 1000m	9 September
Bronze	Stefan Angelov	Wrestling	Men's Greco-Roman light-flyweight	9 September
Bronze	Vasilka Stoeva	Athletics	Women's Discus Throw	10 September

== Athletics ==
Men's 5000 metres

- Mikhail Jelev
  - Heat — DNS (→ did not advance)

Men's High Jump

- Petar Bogdanov
  - Qualification Round — 2.12m (→ did not advance)

== Boxing ==
Men

Athlete	Event	1 Round	2 Round	3 Round	Quarterfinals	Semifinals	Final	
Athlete	Event	Opposition Result	Opposition Result	Opposition Result	Opposition Result	Opposition Result	Opposition Result	Rank
Asen Nikolov	Light Flyweight	Yoshimitsu Aragaki (JPN); W 5-0	Vladimir Ivanov (URS); L 0-5	Did not advance				
Georgi Kostadinov	Flyweight	BYE	Jan Balouch (PAK); W TKO-2	Chris Ius (CAN); W 5-0	Calixto Perez (COL); W 3-2	Leszek Blazynski (POL); W 5-0	Leo Rwabwogo (UGA); W 5-0	Gold medal
Kuncho Kunchev	Featherweight	BYE	Palamdorj Baatar (MGL); W 3-2	Clemente Rojas (COL); L WO	Did not advance			
Ivan Mihailov	Lightweight	Roy Hurdley (PAN); W TKO-2	Hosain Eghmaz (IRN); W 3-2	László Orbán (HUN); L 1-4	Did not advance			
Angel Angelov	Light Welterweight	Luis Contreras (VEN); W TKO-3	Walter Desiderio Gomez (ARG); W 4-1	—N/a	Srisook Bantow (THA); W TKO-2	Issaka Dabore (NIG); W 5-0	Ray Seales (USA); L 2-3	Silver medal
Vladimir Kolev	Welterweight	Abdelhamid Fouad Gad (EGY); W 5-0	David Jackson (UGA); L 1-4	Did not advance				
Nayden Stanchev	Light Middleweight	BYE	John Opio (UGA); W 3-2	Wiesław Rudkowski (POL); L 0-5	Did not advance			
Georgi Stankov	Light Heavyweight	Nikolay Anfimov (URS); L 0-5	Did not advance					
Atanas Suvandzhiev	Heavyweight	Jürgen Fanghänel (GDR); L KO-1	Did not advance					

== Canoeing ==
=== Sprint ===
Men

Athlete	Event	Heats		Repechages		Semifinals		Final	
Athlete	Event	Time	Rank	Time	Rank	Time	Rank	Time	Rank
Boris Lyubenov	C-1 1000 m	4:32.03	2 Q	—N/a		BYE		4:14.65	6
Ivan Burchin; Fedia Damianov	C-2 1000 m	4:14.47	3 Q	BYE		3:53.72	3 Q	3:58.10	Bronze medal
Vasil Chilingrov	K-1 1000 m	DSQ		Did not advance					
Vasil Chilingrov; Aleksandar Donkov	K-2 1000 m	3:45.06	3 Q	BYE		3:36.39	3 Q	3:45.40	9

Women

Athlete	Event	Heats		Repechages		Semifinals		Final	
Athlete	Event	Time	Rank	Time	Rank	Time	Rank	Time	Rank
Natasha Petrova	K-1 500 m	2:25.49	7 Q	2:19.66	4	Did not advance			
Petrana Koleva; Natasha Petrova	K-2 500 m	2:05.16	5 Q	—N/a		1:57.31	2 Q	1:59.40	8

== Cycling ==
Four cyclists represented Bulgaria in 1972.

=== Track ===
1000m time trial

Athlete	Event	Time	Rank
Dimo Angelov Tonchev	Men's 1000m time trial	1:07.55	6

Pursuit

Athlete	Event	Qualification		Round 1/8	Quarterfinals	Semifinals	Final	
Athlete	Event	Time	Rank	Opposition Time	Opposition Time	Opposition Time	Opposition Time	Rank
Ivan Tsvetkov	Men's individual pursuit	5:02.39	15	Did not advance				
Nikifor Petrov Minchev; Plamen Timchev; Dimo Angelov Tonchev; Ivan Tsvetkov	Team pursuit	4:31.43	8 Q	—N/a	West Germany (FRG); L 4:31.55	Did not advance		5

== Fencing ==
Five fencers, all men, represented Bulgaria in 1972.

Men's sabre

- Boris Stavrev
- Stoyko Lipchev
- Anani Mikhaylov

Men's team sabre

- Khristo Khristov, Stoyko Lipchev, Anani Mikhaylov, Valentin Nikolov, Boris Stavrev

== Modern pentathlon ==
Three male pentathletes represented Bulgaria in 1972.

Men's Individual Competition:

- Georgi Stoyanov — 4695 points (→ 26th place)
- Velko Bratanov — 4339 points (→ 50th place)
- Angel Pepelyankov — 3971 points (→ 57th place)

Men's Team Competition:

- Stoyanov, Bratanov, and Pepelyankov — 12957 points (→ 16th place)

== Rowing ==
Men

Athlete	Event	Heats		Repechage		Semifinals		Final	
Athlete	Event	Time	Rank	Time	Rank	Time	Rank	Time	Rank
Yordan Valtchev	Single sculls	7:50.29	1 Q	BYE		8:17.64	4 FB	7:59.55	8
Dimitar Valov; Dimitar Yanakiev; Nenko Dobrev	Coxed pair	8:01.01	2 R	8:10.94	1 Q	8:20.21	4 FB	8:01.86	10
Biser Boyadzhiev; Borislav Vasilev; Nikolay Kolev; Metodi Khalvadzhiski	Coxless four	6:47.99	3 R	7:02.69	2 Q	7:24.93	6 FB	6:54.54	8

== Shooting ==
Six male shooters represented Bulgaria in 1972.

Open

Athlete	Event	Final	
Athlete	Event	Score	Rank
Dencho Denev	50 m pistol	554	11
Dencho Denev	25 m pistol	590	7
Ratcho Kossev	Skeet	DNS	
Ivan Mandov	50 m pistol	544	29
Ivan Mandov	25 m pistol	576	42
Anton Manolov	Skeet	187	33
Stefan Vasilev	50 m rifle three positions	1130	34
Stefan Vasilev	50 m rifle prone	594	21
Emiliyan Vergov	300 m rifle three positions	DNS	
Emiliyan Vergov	50 m rifle three positions	1143	13
Emiliyan Vergov	50 m rifle prone	594	19

== Swimming ==
Men

Athlete	Event	Heat		Semifinal		Final	
Athlete	Event	Time	Rank	Time	Rank	Time	Rank
Angel Chakarov	100 metre breaststroke	1:10.34	30	Did not advance			
Angel Chakarov	200 metre breaststroke	2:30.27	19	Did not advance			
Vasil Dobrev	100 metre butterfly	1:00.07	27	Did not advance			
Vasil Dobrev	200 metre butterfly	2:11.28	22	Did not advance			

Women

Athlete	Event	Heat		Semifinal		Final	
Athlete	Event	Time	Rank	Time	Rank	Time	Rank
Khriska Peycheva	100 metre freestyle	1:03.43	43	Did not advance			

== Volleyball ==
=== Preliminary round ===
Pool A

Pos	Team	Pld	W	L	Pts	SW	SL	SR	SPW	SPL	SPR	Qualification
1	Soviet Union	5	5	0	10	15	3	5.000	257	196	1.311	Semifinals
2	Bulgaria	5	4	1	9	13	8	1.625	294	235	1.251	Semifinals
3	Czechoslovakia	5	3	2	8	11	6	1.833	230	205	1.122	5th–8th semifinals
4	South Korea	5	2	3	7	7	10	0.700	209	197	1.061	5th–8th semifinals
5	Poland	5	1	4	6	8	12	0.667	237	259	0.915	9th place match
6	Tunisia	5	0	5	5	0	15	0.000	90	225	0.400	11th place match

Date		Score		Set 1	Set 2	Set 3	Set 4	Set 5	Total
27 Aug	Bulgaria	3–1	South Korea	16–18	15–6	15–9	15–13		61–46
29 Aug	Bulgaria	3–2	Czechoslovakia	15–11	15–11	12–15	14–16	15–9	71–62
31 Aug	Soviet Union	3–1	Bulgaria	9–15	15–10	15–11	15–10		54–46
02 Sep	Bulgaria	3–2	Poland	14–16	12–15	15–7	15–3	15–10	71–51
05 Sep	Bulgaria	3–0	Tunisia	15–10	15–5	15–7			45–22

=== Semifinals ===
Date		Score		Set 1	Set 2	Set 3	Set 4	Set 5	Total
08 Sep	Bulgaria	2–3	Japan	15–13	15–9	9–15	9–15	12–15	60–67

=== Bronze medal match ===
Date		Score		Set 1	Set 2	Set 3	Set 4	Set 5	Total
09 Sep	Soviet Union	3–0	Bulgaria	15–11	15–8	15–13			45–32

=== Team roster ===
- Dimiter Karov
- Brunko Iliev
- Alex Trenev
- Ivan Ivanov
- Dimiter Zlatanov
- Zdravko Simeonov
- Tsano Tsanov
- Kiril Slavov
- Emil Vulchev
- Emil Trenev
- Luchezar Soyanov
- Ivan Dimitrov

== Water polo ==
=== Pool C ===
Nation	Pld	W	D	L	GF	GA
Soviet Union	4	4	0	0	30	9
Italy	4	3	0	1	25	16
Spain	4	2	0	2	19	20
Bulgaria	4	1	0	3	18	25
Japan	4	0	0	4	14	36

	August 28		1st	2nd	3rd	4th
Italy	8-5	Bulgaria	3-1	3-2	2-1	0-1

	August 29		1st	2nd	3rd	4th
Soviet Union	7-2	Bulgaria	2-0	2-1	2-0	1-1

	August 30		1st	2nd	3rd	4th
Bulgaria	7-4	Japan	3-1	0-1	2-1	2-1

	August 31		1st	2nd	3rd	4th
Spain	6-4	Bulgaria	0-0	2-1	2-1	2-2

=== Classification 7th – 12th ===
Pos.	Nation	Pld	W	D	L	GF	GA
7	Netherlands	5	4	1	0	29	25
8	Romania	5	4	1	0	25	18
9	Cuba	5	2	1	2	23	24
10	Spain	5	2	0	3	24	20
11	Bulgaria	5	0	2	3	15	17
12	Australia	5	0	1	4	18	27

	September 1		1st	2nd	3rd	4th
Netherlands	5-2	Bulgaria	1-0	0-1	2-1	2-0

	September 2		1st	2nd	3rd	4th
Romania	4-3	Bulgaria	2-2	1-0	1-0	0-1

	September 3		1st	2nd	3rd	4th
Australia	4-4	Bulgaria	2-2	1-0	1-1	0-1

	September 4		1st	2nd	3rd	4th
Cuba	4-4	Bulgaria	0-0	2-3	1-0	1-1

=== Team roster ===
  - Bisser Naoumov
  - Ivan Kovatchev
  - Alexander Chpitzer
  - Toma Tomov
  - Plamen Brankov
  - Mladen Khristov
  - Nedelcho Yordanov
  - Vassil Tomov
  - Andrei Konstantinov
  - Matei Popov
  - Lubomir Rountov

== Weightlifting ==
Men

Athlete	Event	Military press		Snatch		Clean & Jerk		Total	Rank
Athlete	Event	Result	Rank	Result	Rank	Result	Rank	Total	Rank
Atanas Kiroy	56 kg	117.5	7	105	5	140	4	362.5	5
Georgi Todorov	56 kg	110	12	100	10	140	5	350	8
Norair Nurikyan	60 kg	127.5 OR	2	117.5	4	157.5 WR	1	402.5 WR	Gold medal
Mladen Kuchev	67,5 kg	157.5 WR	1	125	4	167.5	2	450	Silver medal
Yordan Bikov	75 kg	160	3	140	4	185	1	485 WR	Gold medal
Andon Nikolov	90 kg	180	3	155	1	190	6	525 OR	Gold medal
Atanas Shopov	90 kg	180	4	145	7	192.5	3	517.5	Silver medal
Aleksandar Kraychev	110 kg	197.5	2	162.5	5	202.5	5	562.5	Silver medal
Stancho Penchev	110 kg	0	NVL	DNS		DNS		0	AC

== Wrestling ==
Editing process right now

Key

- VT - Victory or Lose by Fall.
- PP - Decision by Points - the loser with technical points.
- PO - Decision by Points - the loser without technical points.
- DR - Draw in penalty points -draw in points.

Men's freestyle

Athlete	Event	Round 1	Round 2	Round 3	Round 4	Round 5	Round 6	Medal round	
Athlete	Event	Opposition Result	Opposition Result	Opposition Result	Opposition Result	Opposition Result	Opposition Result	Opposition Result	Rank
Ognyan Nikolov	−48 kg	Baygin (TUR); D 2-2 ^{DR}	Tsobari (ISR); W 4-0 ^{VT}	Laták (HUN); W 4-0 ^{VT}	Dmitriyev (URS); L 1-3 ^{PO}	—N/a	—N/a	Javadi (IRN); W 3-1 ^{PP}	Silver medal
Baju Baev	−52 kg	Grassi (ITA); D 2-2 ^{DR}	Ganbat (MGL); D 4-4 ^{DR}	Did not advance					16
Ivan Shavov	−57 kg	Yıldırım (TUR); W 3-1 ^{PP}	Tanaquin (PHI); W 4-0 ^{VT}	Kuleshov (URS); W 4-0 ^{VT}	Zedzicki (POL); W 4-0 ^{VT}	Yanagida (JPN); L 1-3 ^{PO}	Sanders (USA); L 1-3 ^{PO}	Did not advance	5
Ivan Krastev	−62 kg	Salugta (PHI); W 4-0 ^{VT}	Jorma Liimatainen (FIN); W 3-1 ^{PP}	Szabo (HUN); W 3-1 ^{PP}	Coman (ROU); W 3-1 ^{PP}	Burge (GUA); W 4-0 ^{VT}	Abdulbekov (URS); D 2-2 ^{DR}	Akdağ (TUR); L 1-3 ^{PO}	Bronze medal
Ismail Yuseinov	−68 kg	Ashuraliyev (URS); L 1–3 ^{PO}	Natsagdorj (MGL); W 3-1 ^{PP}	Quintero (CUB); W 4-0 ^{VT}	Şahin (TUR); L 0-4 ^{PO}	Did not advance			11
Yancho Pavlov	−74 kg	Robin (FRA); W 3-1 ^{PP}	Abou Assi (LIB); W 4-0 ^{VT}	Sereeter (MGL); W 3-1 ^{PP}	Blaser (SUI); W 3-1 ^{PP}	Nitschke (GDR); W 3-1 ^{PP}	Wells (USA); L 0-4 ^{VT}	Did not advance	4
Ivan Iliev	−82 kg	Hryb (CAN); W 3-1 ^{PP}	Stottmeister (GDR); L 0-4 ^{VT}	Bye	Sasaki (JPN); L 1-3 ^{PO}	Did not advance			10
Rusi Petrov	−90 kg	Grinstead (GBR); W 4-0 ^{VT}	Güçlü (TUR); W 3-1 ^{PP}	Grangier (FRA); W 3-1 ^{PP}	Spindler (GDR); L 1-3 ^{PO}	Bye	Peterson (USA); L 0-4 ^{VT}	Did not advance	4

Men's Greco-Roman

Athlete	Event	Elimination Pool				Quarterfinal	Semifinal	Final / BM	
Athlete	Event	Opposition Result	Opposition Result	Opposition Result	Rank	Opposition Result	Opposition Result	Opposition Result	Rank
Armen Nazaryan	−60 kg	El-Gharably (EGY); W 3–1 ^{PP}	Khvoshch (UKR); W 3–1 ^{PP}	—N/a	1 Q	Sasamoto (JPN); W 3–1 ^{PP}	Jung J-H (KOR); L 1–3 ^{PP}	Shevtsov (RUS); W 3–1 ^{PP}	3rd place, bronze medalist(s)
Nikolay Gergov	−66 kg	Füredy (HUN); W 3–1 ^{PP}	Kim I-S (KOR); L 0–3 ^{PO}	—N/a	2	Did not advance			14
Vladislav Metodiev	−84 kg	Thomberg (EST); W 3–0 ^{PO}	Yerlikaya (TUR); L 1–3 ^{PP}	Daragan (UKR); L 0–5 ^{VB}	3	Did not advance			12
Kaloyan Dinchev	−96 kg	Tarkong (PLW); W 4–0 ^{ST}	Chkhaidze (KGZ); L 1–3 ^{PP}	—N/a	2	Did not advance			8
Sergei Mureiko	−120 kg	Mikulski (POL); W 3–0 ^{PO}	Gardner (USA); L 1–3 ^{PP}	Mizgaitis (LTU); W 3–1 ^{PP}	2	Did not advance			8

Women's freestyle

Athlete	Event	Elimination Pool			Classification	Semifinal	Final / BM	
Athlete	Event	Opposition Result	Opposition Result	Rank	Opposition Result	Opposition Result	Opposition Result	Rank
Stanka Zlateva	−72 kg	Hamaguchi (JPN); L 0–4 ^{ST}	Montgomery (USA); L 0–5 ^{VT}	3	Did not advance			12
