= Wrestling at the 1972 Summer Olympics – Men's freestyle 62 kg =

Men's freestyle 62 kg at the Games of the XX Olympiad
- Venue: Messe München
- Dates: 27–31 August 1972
- Competitors: 26 from 26 nations

Medalists
1st place, gold medalist(s)		Zagalav Abdulbekov	Soviet Union
2nd place, silver medalist(s)		Vehbi Akdağ	Turkey
3rd place, bronze medalist(s)		Ivan Krastev	Bulgaria

The Men's Freestyle 62 kg at the 1972 Summer Olympics as part of the wrestling program at the Fairgrounds, Judo and Wrestling Hall.

== Medalists ==
Gold	Zagalav Abdulbekov; Soviet Union
Silver	Vehbi Akdağ; Turkey
Bronze	Ivan Krastev; Bulgaria

== Tournament results ==
The competition used a form of negative points tournament, with negative points given for any result short of a fall. Accumulation of 6 negative points eliminated the wrestler. When only two or three wrestlers remain, a special final round is used to determine the order of the medals.

Legend

- DNA — Did not appear
- TPP — Total penalty points
- MPP — Match penalty points

Penalties

- 0 — Won by Fall, Passivity, Injury and Forfeit
- 0.5 — Won by Technical Superiority
- 1 — Won by Points
- 2 — Draw
- 2.5 — Draw, Passivity
- 3 — Lost by Points
- 3.5 — Lost by Technical Superiority
- 4 — Lost by Fall, Passivity, Injury and Forfeit

=== Round 1 ===
TPP	MPP		Time		MPP	TPP
0	0	Petre Coman (ROU)	2:52	Carlos Hurtado (PER)	4	4
3.5	3.5	Kenneth Dawes (GBR)		Patrick Bolger (CAN)	0.5	0.5
4	4	László Szabó (HUN)	7:00	Jorma Liimatainen (FIN)	0	0
4	4	Eliseo Salugta (PHI)	0:24	Ivan Krastev (BUL)	0	0
4	4	Orlando Gonçalves (POR)	2:35	Vehbi Akdağ (TUR)	0	0
3	3	Zdzisław Stolarski (POL)		Satpal Singh (IND)	1	1
1	1	Théodule Toulotte (FRA)		Vicente Martínez (MEX)	3	3
0	0	Joseph Burge (GUA)	2:56	Panagiotis Koutsoupakis (GRE)	4	4
0.5	0.5	Shamseddin Seyed-Abbasi (IRI)		Stanislav Tůma (TCH)	3.5	3.5
1	1	José Ramos (CUB)		Gerhard Weisenberger (FRG)	3	3
0.5	0.5	Kiyoshi Abe (JPN)		Ahmad Djan (AFG)	3.5	3.5
0	0	Gene Davis (USA)	7:36	Zevegiin Oidov (MGL)	4	4
3.5	3.5	Jakob Tanner (SUI)		Zagalav Abdulbekov (URS)	0.5	0.5

=== Round 2 ===
TPP	MPP		Time		MPP	TPP
0	0	Petre Coman (ROU)	2:09	Kenneth Dawes (GBR)	4	7.5
8	4	Carlos Hurtado (PER)	7:34	Patrick Bolger (CAN)	0	0.5
4	0	László Szabó (HUN)	1:18	Eliseo Salugta (PHI)	4	8
3	3	Jorma Liimatainen (FIN)		Ivan Krastev (BUL)	1	1
8	4	Orlando Gonçalves (POR)	5:27	Zdzisław Stolarski (POL)	0	3
0	0	Vehbi Akdağ (TUR)	7:26	Satpal Singh (IND)	4	5
4	3	Théodule Toulotte (FRA)		Joseph Burge (GUA)	1	1
6	3	Vicente Martínez (MEX)		Panagiotis Koutsoupakis (GRE)	1	5
1.5	1	Shamseddin Seyed-Abbasi (IRI)		José Ramos (CUB)	3	4
6.5	3	Stanislav Tůma (TCH)		Gerhard Weisenberger (FRG)	1	4
1	0.5	Kiyoshi Abe (JPN)		Gene Davis (USA)	3.5	3.5
4.5	1	Ahmad Djan (AFG)		Jakob Tanner (SUI)	3	6.5
8	4	Zevegiin Oidov (MGL)	2:19	Zagalav Abdulbekov (URS)	0	0.5

=== Round 3 ===
TPP	MPP		Time		MPP	TPP
0	0	Petre Coman (ROU)	8:45	Patrick Bolger (CAN)	4	4.5
7	3	László Szabó (HUN)		Ivan Krastev (BUL)	1	2
6	3	Jorma Liimatainen (FIN)		Vehbi Akdağ (TUR)	1	1
6	3	Zdzisław Stolarski (POL)		Théodule Toulotte (FRA)	1	5
8	3	Satpal Singh (IND)		Joseph Burge (GUA)	1	2
8.5	3.5	Panagiotis Koutsoupakis (GRE)		Shamseddin Seyed-Abbasi (IRI)	0.5	2
8	4	José Ramos (CUB)	4:12	Kiyoshi Abe (JPN)	0	1
5	1	Gerhard Weisenberger (FRG)		Ahmad Djan (AFG)	3	7.5
7.5	4	Gene Davis (USA)	3:25	Zagalav Abdulbekov (URS)	0	0.5

=== Round 4 ===
TPP	MPP		Time		MPP	TPP
3	3	Petre Coman (ROU)		Ivan Krastev (BUL)	1	3
8	3.5	Patrick Bolger (CAN)		Vehbi Akdağ (TUR)	0.5	1.5
8.5	3.5	Théodule Toulotte (FRA)		Shamseddin Seyed-Abbasi (IRI)	0.5	2.5
3	1	Joseph Burge (GUA)		Gerhard Weisenberger (FRG)	3	8
4	3	Kiyoshi Abe (JPN)		Zagalav Abdulbekov (URS)	1	1.5

=== Round 5 ===
TPP	MPP		Time		MPP	TPP
6	3	Petre Coman (ROU)		Vehbi Akdağ (TUR)	1	2.5
3	0	Ivan Krastev (BUL)	8:43	Joseph Burge (GUA)	4	7
5.5	3	Shamseddin Seyed-Abbasi (IRI)		Kiyoshi Abe (JPN)	1	5
1.5		Zagalav Abdulbekov (URS)		Bye		

=== Round 6 ===
TPP	MPP		Time		MPP	TPP
3.5	2	Zagalav Abdulbekov (URS)		Ivan Krastev (BUL)	2	5
5.5	3	Vehbi Akdağ (TUR)		Kiyoshi Abe (JPN)	1	6
5.5		Shamseddin Seyed-Abbasi (IRI)		DNA		

=== Final ===
Results from the preliminary round are carried forward into the final (shown in yellow).

TPP	MPP		Time		MPP	TPP
	2	Zagalav Abdulbekov (URS)		Ivan Krastev (BUL)	2	
2	0	Zagalav Abdulbekov (URS)	2:57	Vehbi Akdağ (TUR)	4	
5	3	Ivan Krastev (BUL)		Vehbi Akdağ (TUR)	1	5

== Final standings ==
1. Zagalav Abdulbekov (URS)
2. Vehbi Akdağ (TUR)
3. Ivan Krastev (BUL)
4. Kiyoshi Abe (JPN)
5. Shamseddin Seyed-Abbasi (IRI)
6. Petre Coman (ROU)
7. Joseph Burge (GUA)
