= Spain at the 1972 Summer Olympics =

- IOC code: ESP
- NOC: Spanish Olympic Committee

in Munich
- Competitors: 123 (118 men and 5 women) in 17 sports
- Flag bearer: Francisco Fernández Ochoa
- Medals Ranked 43rd: Gold 0 Silver 0 Bronze 1 Total 1

Summer Olympics appearances (overview)
- 1900; 1904–1912; 1920; 1924; 1928; 1932; 1936; 1948; 1952; 1956; 1960; 1964; 1968; 1972; 1976; 1980; 1984; 1988; 1992; 1996; 2000; 2004; 2008; 2012; 2016; 2020; 2024; 2028

Spain competed at the 1972 Summer Olympics in Munich, West Germany. 123 competitors, 118 men and 5 women, took part in 59 events in 17 sports.

== Medalists ==
Medal	Name	Sport	Event	Date
Bronze	Enrique Rodríguez	Boxing	Light flyweight	10 September

== Archery ==
In the first modern archery competition at the Olympics, Spain entered one man and one woman. Their highest placing competitor was Maria Teresa Romero, at 13th place in the women's competition.

Men's Individual Competition:

- Emilio Ramos — 2199 points (→ 49th place)

Women's Individual Competition:

- Maria Teresa Romero — 2347 points (→ 13th place)

== Athletics ==
Men's 200 metres

- Francesco García

- Heat — 20.89
- Quarterfinals — 20.77 (→ did not advance)

Men's 800 metres

- Manuel Gayoso

- Heat — 1:47.5
- Semifinals — 1:47.7 (→ did not advance)

- Antonio Fernández

- Heat — DQ (→ did not advance)

Men's 4 × 100 m Relay

- José Luis Sánchez Paraíso, Manuel Carballo, Francesco García, and Luis Sarría

- Heat — DNF (→ did not advance)

Men's Marathon

- Agustín Fernández — 2:27.24 (→ 39th place)
- Carlos Pérez — 2:33.22 (→ 50th place)

== Basketball ==
=== Men's team competition ===
- Preliminary Round (Group A):

- Spain — Australia 79-74
- Spain — Cuba 53-74
- Spain — Brazil 69-72
- Spain — Egypt 72-58
- Spain — Japan 87-76
- Spain — United States 56-72
- Spain — Czechoslovakia 70-74

- Classification Round:

- 9th-12th place: Spain — Poland 76-87
- 11th-12th place: Spain — West Germany 84-83 → 11th place

- Team Roster

- Carmelo Cabrera
- Clifford Luyk
- Enrique Margall
- Francisco Buscato
- Gonzalo Sagi-Vela
- Jesús Iradier
- Juan Antonio Corbalán
- Luis Miguel Santillana
- Miguel Ángel Estrada
- Rafael Rullán
- Vicente Ramos
- Wayne Brabender

== Boxing ==
Men's Flyweight (– 51 kg)

- Antonio García

- First Round — Bye
- Second Round — Lost to Niamdash Batsuren (MGL), 1:4

== Cycling ==
Eight cyclists represented Spain in 1972.

Individual road race

- Jaime Huélamo — 3rd place, but disqualified after failing a doping test
- Francisco Elorriaga — 16th place
- José Viejo — 37th place
- Tomás Nistal — 54th place

Team time trial

- Jaime Huélamo
- Carlos Melero
- José Teña
- José Viejo

Sprint

- Félix Suárez

Individual pursuit

- Miguel Espinós

== Diving ==
Men's 10m Platform

- Jorge Head — 243.27 points (→ 34th place)

Women's 10m Platform

- Carmen Nunez — 157.95 points (→ 25th place)

== Handball ==
=== Men's team competition ===
Spain lost all three of its first-round games, to West Germany, Romania, and Norway. The fourth-place finish put Spain into the thirteenth- to sixteenth-place consolation round, where they lost their game against the United States to set up a fifteenth and sixteenth place match against Tunisia. Spain won this game, 23–20.

- Preliminary Round (Group C):

- Spain — West Germany 10-13
- Spain — Romania 12-15
- Spain — Norway 17-19

- Classification Round:

- 13th-16th place: Spain — United States 20-22
- 15th-16th place: Spain — Tunisia 23-20 → 15th place

- Team Roster

- Antonio Andreu
- Fernando de Andrés
- Francisco López
- Javier García
- Jesús Guerrero
- José Faustino Villamarín
- José Manuel Taure
- José Perramón
- José Rochel
- Juan Antonio Medina
- Juan Miguel Igartua
- Juan Morera
- Miguel Ángel Cascallana
- Santos Labaca
- Vicente Ortega

== Hockey ==
=== Men's team competition ===
- Preliminary Round (Group A):

- Spain — Argentina 1-1
- Spain — Pakistan 1-1
- Spain — Malaysia 0-0
- Spain — Belgium 1-0
- Spain — France 3-2
- Spain — West Germany 1-2
- Spain — Uganda 2-2

- Classification Round:

- 5th-8th place: Spain — Great Britain 0-2
- 7th-8th place: Spain — Malaysia 2-1 → 7th place

- Team Roster

- Agustín Churruca
- Antonio Nogués
- Francisco Amat
- Francisco Fábregas
- Francisco Segura
- Jaime Amat
- Jaime Arbós
- Jorge Fábregas
- Jorge Camiña
- José Alustiza
- José Borrell
- José Sallés
- Juan Amat
- Juan Arbós
- Juan Quintana
- Luis Alberto Carrera
- Luis Twose
- Ramón Quintana

== Shooting ==
Nine male shooters represented Spain in 1972.

Open

Athlete	Event	Final	
Athlete	Event	Points	Rank
Juan Ávalos	Skeet	182	45
José Luis Calvo	50 m rifle prone	587	64
Damián Cerdá	25 m rapid fire pistol	586	15
Luis del Cerro	50 m rifle prone	590	49
Jaime González	25 m rapid fire pistol	592	5
Miguel Marina	Skeet	192	11
Severino Requejo	50 m free pistol	536	41
Ricardo Sancho	Trap	191	9
Eladio Vallduvi	Trap	191	10

== Swimming ==
Men's 100m Freestyle

- Jorge Comas

- Heat — 53.70s
- Semifinals — 53.92s (→ did not advance)

Men's 4 × 100 m Freestyle Relay

- Jorge Comas, Antonio Culebras, Enrique Melo, and José Pujol

- Heat — 3:38.77
- Final — 3:38.21 (→ 8th place)

== Water polo ==
=== Men's team competition ===
- Preliminary Round (Group C):

- Spain — Japan 6-4
- Spain — Italy 2-6
- Spain — Soviet Union 5-8
- Spain — Bulgaria 6-4

- Second Round (Group II):

- Spain — Romania 4-7
- Spain — Australia 8-4
- Spain — Cuba 3-4
- Spain — Netherlands 5-7 → 10th place

- Team Roster

- Alfonso Cánovas
- Enrique Guardia
- Gabriel Soler
- Gaspar Ventura
- Joan Sans
- José Padrós
- Juan Jané
- Juan Rubio
- Luis Bestit
- Poncio Puigdevall
- Salvador Franch
