= Yang Jung-mo =

South Korean freestyle wrestler

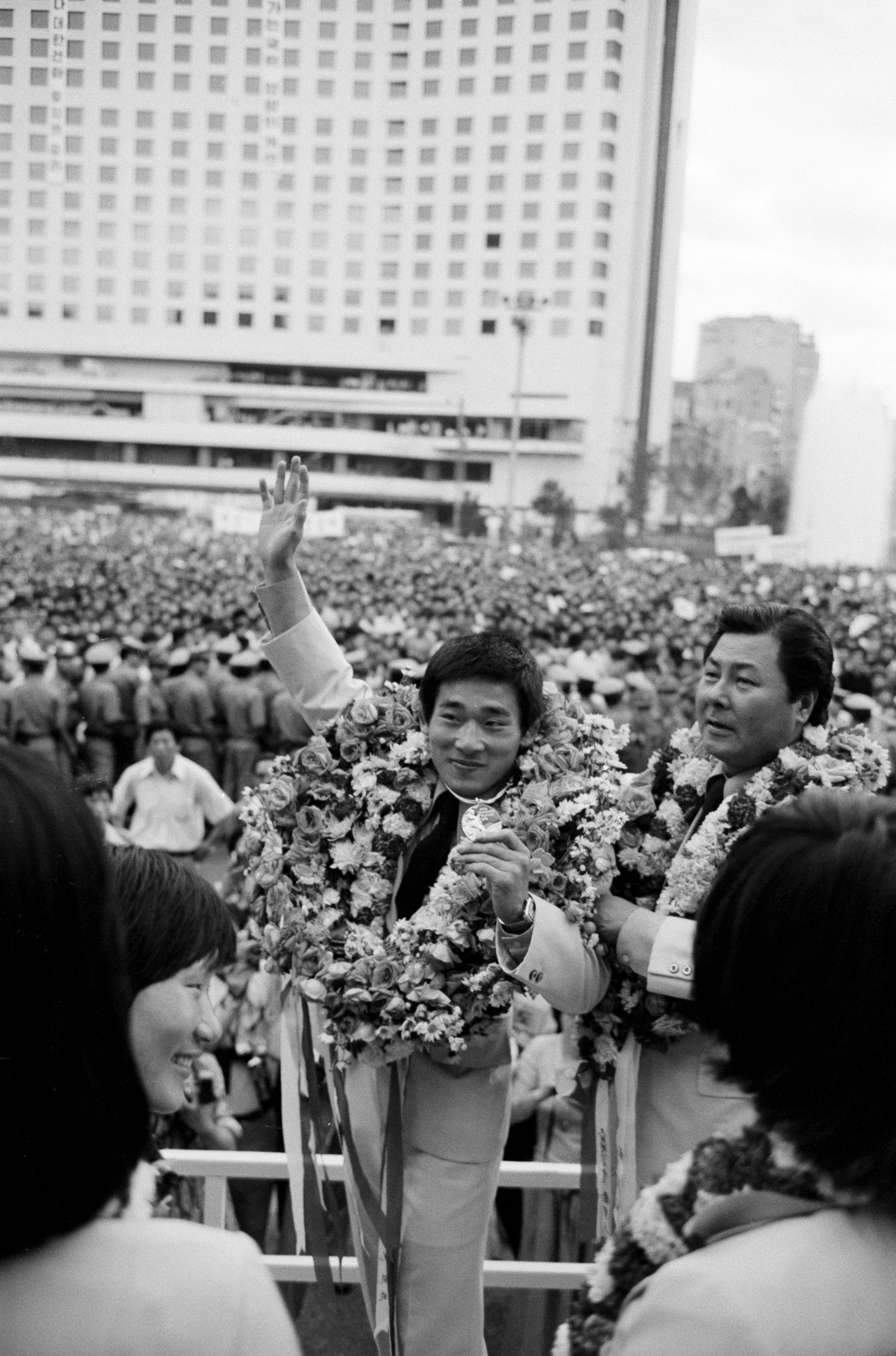
- Yang in 1976

Medal record

Men's freestyle wrestling

Representing South Korea

Olympic Games
Gold medal – first place	1976 Montreal	62 kg

World Championships
Silver medal – second place	1978 Mexico City	62 kg
Bronze medal – third place	1975 Minsk	62 kg

Asian Games
Gold medal – first place	1978 Bangkok	62 kg
Gold medal – first place	1974 Teheran	62 kg

Yang Jung-Mo (Korean: 양정모; Hanja: 梁正模; born January 22, 1953) is a retired South Korean Olympic freestyle wrestler and the first Olympic champion from South Korea. He was born in Busan, South Korea. He received a gold medal in the featherweight division of wrestling at the 1976 Summer Olympics in Montreal.

== Olympic results ==
1976 (as a men's freestyle 62 kg)

- Defeated Egon Beiler (CAN), won by points (18-7), penalty points - 0,5.
- Defeated Helmut Strumpf (GDR), won by fall, penalty points - 0.
- Defeated Vehbi Akdağ (TUR), won by points (17-6), penalty points - 0,5.
- Defeated Eduard Giray (FRG), won by technical superiority, penalty points - 0.
- Defeated Gene Davis (USA), won by fall, penalty points - 0.
- Lost to World Champion Zevegiin Oidov (MGL), lost by points (8-10), penalty points - 3. Total penalty points - 4.

He won gold medal according to special criteria for determining the winner:

- Gold medal - Yang Jung-Mo (KOR)
- Silver medal - Zevegiin Oidov (MGL)
- Bronze medal - Gene Davis (USA)
