= Zevegiin Oidov =

Mongolian freestyle wrestler (born 1949)

Personal information
- Born: May 25, 1949 (age 77) Kharkhorin, Övörkhangai, Mongolia
Medal record
Men's freestyle wrestling
Representing Mongolia
Olympic Games
Silver medal – second place	1976 Montreal	62 kg
World Championships
Gold medal – first place	1974 Istanbul	62 kg
Gold medal – first place	1975 Minsk	62 kg
Bronze medal – third place	1977 Lausanne	68 kg
Asian Games
Gold medal – first place	1978 Bangkok	68 kg
Silver medal – second place	1974 Tehran	62 kg

Zevegiin Oidov (Mongolian: Зэвэгийн Ойдов; born May 25, 1949) is a retired Mongolian wrestler. He is the 1976 Olympic vice-champion in the freestyle 62 kg class. He also won two world champion titles, in 1974 and 1975 in the 62 kg class. In 1977 competing in the freestyle 68 kg class he came in third, taking the Bronze medal.

== Olympic results ==
1976 (as a men's freestyle 62 kg)

- Lost to Gene Davis by points (8-15), penalty points - 3.
- Defeated Mihály Fodor by technical fall, penalty points - 0.
- Defeated Théodule Toulotte by fall, penalty points - 0.
- Defeated Helmut Strumpf by technical fall, penalty points - 0.
- Defeated multiple European Champion Ivan Yankov by fall, penalty points - 0.
- Defeated 1973 World Champion Mohsen Farahvashi by technical fall, penalty points - 0.
- Defeated eventual Olympic Champion Yang Jung-mo by points (10-8), penalty points - 1. Total penalty points - 4.

According to Zevegiin Oidov, he pinned Gene Davis with his back to the mat two times, but the referee completely ignored the pin and didn't count it. This is confirmed by the video recording. At this tournament, Oidov had more matches than any other wrestler in the 62 kg event. He placing second according to special criteria for determining the winner - Oidov and Yang Jung-Mo scored the same number of penalty points (4 points), so the Olympic gold medal was decided by their respective matches against Gene Davis: Oidov suffered a points loss (3 penalty points), whereas Yang secured a victory by fall (0 penalty points).:

- Gold medal - Yang Jung-Mo (KOR)
- Silver medal - Zevegiin Oidov (MGL)
- Bronze medal - Gene Davis (USA)

== Other Olympic appearances ==
In 1972 he competed in the Munich games in the 62 kg Freestyle class under the name Oidov, Zeveg where he was eliminated after the second round in which his opponent was Abdulbekov, Zagalav of the URS who went on to win the Gold Medal. His final Olympic appearance was the 1980 Moscow games where he competed in the 68 kg Freestyle class under the name of Oidov, Zevegying and was eliminated after the third round.

== See also ==
- Wrestling at the 1976 Summer Olympics
