= Wrestling at the 1976 Summer Olympics – Men's freestyle 62 kg =

Men's freestyle 62 kg at the Games of the XXI Olympiad
- Venue: Maurice Richard Arena
- Dates: 27–31 July 1976
- Competitors: 17 from 17 nations

Medalists
1st place, gold medalist(s)		Yang Jung-Mo	South Korea
2nd place, silver medalist(s)		Zevegiin Oidov	Mongolia
3rd place, bronze medalist(s)		Gene Davis	United States

The Men's Freestyle 62 kg at the 1976 Summer Olympics as part of the wrestling program were held at the Maurice Richard Arena.

== Medalists ==
Gold	Yang Jung-Mo; South Korea
Silver	Zevegiin Oidov; Mongolia
Bronze	Gene Davis; United States

== Tournament results ==
The competition used a form of negative points, with negative points given for any result short of a fall. Accumulation of 6 negative points eliminated the loser wrestler. When only three wrestlers remain, a special final round is used to determine the order of the medals.

Legend

- TF — Won by Fall
- IN — Won by Opponent Injury
- DQ — Won by Passivity
- D1 — Won by Passivity, the winner is passive too
- D2 — Both wrestlers lost by Passivity
- FF — Won by Forfeit
- DNA — Did not appear
- TPP — Total penalty points
- MPP — Match penalty points

Penalties

- 0 — Won by Fall, Technical Superiority, Passivity, Injury and Forfeit
- 0.5 — Won by Points, 8-11 points difference
- 1 — Won by Points, 1-7 points difference
- 2 — Won by Passivity, the winner is passive too
- 3 — Lost by Points, 1-7 points difference
- 3.5 — Lost by Points, 8-11 points difference
- 4 — Lost by Fall, Technical Superiority, Passivity, Injury and Forfeit

=== Round 1 ===
TPP	MPP		Score		MPP	TPP
4	4	Marco Terán (ECU)	TF / 5:47	Théodule Toulotte (FRA)	0	0
1	1	Gene Davis (USA)	15 - 8	Zevegiin Oidov (MGL)	3	3
3	3	Mihály Fodor (HUN)	4 - 6	Eduard Giray (FRG)	1	1
4	4	Kenneth Dawes (GBR)	TF / 1:41	Sergey Timofeyev (URS)	0	0
4	4	Benjamin Varela (PUR)	TF / 1:30	Helmut Strumpf (GDR)	0	0
0.5	0.5	Yang Jung-Mo (KOR)	18 - 7	Egon Beiler (CAN)	3.5	3.5
1	1	Vehbi Akdağ (TUR)	8 - 6	Mohsen Farahvashi (IRI)	3	3
1	1	Kenkichi Maekawa (JPN)	8 - 4	Petre Coman (ROU)	3	3
0		Ivan Yankov (BUL)		Bye		

=== Round 2 ===
TPP	MPP		Score		MPP	TPP
0	0	Ivan Yankov (BUL)	DQ / 7:35	Marco Terán (ECU)	4	8
4	4	Théodule Toulotte (FRA)	TF / 8:38	Gene Davis (USA)	0	1
3	0	Zevegiin Oidov (MGL)	DQ / 7:12	Mihály Fodor (HUN)	4	7
1	0	Eduard Giray (FRG)	DQ / 8:24	Kenneth Dawes (GBR)	4	8
0	0	Sergei Timofeyev (URS)	TF / 1:22	Benjamin Varela (PUR)	4	8
4	4	Helmut Strumpf (GDR)	TF / 0:33	Yang Jung-Mo (KOR)	0	0.5
4.5	1	Egon Beiler (CAN)	10 - 7	Vehbi Akdağ (TUR)	3	4
4	1	Mohsen Farahvashi (IRI)	4 - 4	Kenkichi Maekawa (JPN)	3	4
3		Petre Coman (ROU)		Bye		

=== Round 3 ===
TPP	MPP		Score		MPP	TPP
7	4	Petre Coman (ROU)	2 - 14	Ivan Yankov (BUL)	0	0
8	4	Théodule Toulotte (FRA)	TF / 8:23	Zevegiin Oidov (MGL)	0	3
1	0	Gene Davis (USA)	TF / 7:53	Eduard Giray (FRG)	4	5
3	3	Sergei Timofeyev (URS)	13 - 17	Helmut Strumpf (GDR)	1	5
1	0.5	Yang Jung-Mo (KOR)	17 - 6	Vehbi Akdağ (TUR)	3.5	7.5
7.5	3	Egon Beiler (CAN)	5 - 9	Mohsen Farahvashi (IRI)	1	5
4		Kenkichi Maekawa (JPN)		Bye		

=== Round 4 ===
TPP	MPP		Score		MPP	TPP
8	4	Kenkichi Maekawa (JPN)	D2 / 5:55	Ivan Yankov (BUL)	4	4
1	0	Gene Davis (USA)	29 - 13	Sergei Timofeyev (URS)	4	7
3	0	Zevegiin Oidov (MGL)	DQ / 5:36	Helmut Strumpf (GDR)	4	9
9	4	Eduard Giray (FRG)	TF / 3:21	Yang Jung-Mo (KOR)	0	1
5		Mohsen Farahvashi (IRI)		Bye		

=== Round 5 ===
TPP	MPP		Score		MPP	TPP
6	1	Mohsen Farahvashi (IRI)	18 - 12	Gene Davis (USA)	3	4
8	4	Ivan Yankov (BUL)	TF / 8:46	Zevegiin Oidov (MGL)	0	3
1		Yang Jung-Mo (KOR)		Bye		

=== Round 6 ===
TPP	MPP		Score		MPP	TPP
1	0	Yang Jung-Mo (KOR)	TF / 5:54	Gene Davis (USA)	4	8
10	4	Mohsen Farahvashi (IRI)	DQ / 7:44	Zevegiin Oidov (MGL)	0	3

=== Final ===
Results from the preliminary round are carried forward into the final (shown in yellow).

TPP	MPP		Score		MPP	TPP
	1	Gene Davis (USA)	15 - 8	Zevegiin Oidov (MGL)	3	
	0	Yang Jung-Mo (KOR)	TF / 5:54	Gene Davis (USA)	4	5
4	1	Zevegiin Oidov (MGL)	10 - 8	Yang Jung-Mo (KOR)	3	3

== Final standings ==
1. Yang Jung-Mo (KOR)
2. Zevegiin Oidov (MGL)
3. Gene Davis (USA)
4. Mohsen Farahvashi (IRI)
5. Ivan Yankov (BUL)
6. Sergei Timofeyev (URS)
7. Kenkichi Maekawa (JPN)
8. Helmut Strumpf (GDR)
