= Shigeharu =

- Gender: Male

Origin
- Origin: Japanese
- Meaning: Different meanings depending on the kanji used

Shigeharu (written: 重治, 繁晴, 滋春 or 秀治) is a masculine Japanese given name. Notable people with the name include:

- Shigeharu Aoyama (青山 繁晴; born 1952), Japanese politician
- Shigeharu Kuwabara (桑原 秀治; born 1940), Japanese water polo player
- Shigeharu Matsumoto (松本 重治; 1899–1989), Japanese journalist
- Shigeharu Mukai (向井 滋春; born 1949), Japanese jazz musician
- Shigeharu Murata (村田 重治; 1909–1942), Japanese torpedo bomber pilot officer
- Shigeharu Nakano (中野 重治; 1902–1979), Japanese writer and politician
- Shigeharu Shiba (斯波 重治; born 1932), Japanese anime director and producer
- Takenaka Shigeharu (竹中 重治}; 1544–1579), Japanese samurai
- Shigeharu Ueki (植木 繁晴; born 1954), Japanese footballer
