= Minegishi =

Minegishi (written: 嶺岸, 峰岸 or 峯岸) is a Japanese surname. Notable people with the surname include:

- Hikaru Minegishi (嶺岸 光, born 1991), Filipino footballer
- Keisuke Minegishi (嶺岸 佳介, born 1991), Japanese footballer
- Minami Minegishi (峯岸 みなみ, born 1992), Japanese idol, singer and actress
- Naoto Minegishi (峰岸 直人, born 1950), Japanese water polo player
- Nobuaki Minegishi (嶺岸 信明), Japanese manga artist
- Toru Minegishi (峰岸 透), Japanese video game composer
- Tōru Minegishi (actor) (峰岸 徹, 1943–2008), Japanese actor
