= Liimatainen =

Liimatainen is a Finnish surname. Notable people with the surname include:

- Heikki L, real name Heikki Liimatainen, Finnish house music producer, DJ and remixer
- Heikki Liimatainen (athlete) (1894–1980), Finnish athlete and Olympian in Cross Country
- Jani Liimatainen (born 1980), guitar player and a founding members of the power metal band Sonata Arctica
- Jorma Liimatainen (born 1947), Finnish wrestler
- Petri Liimatainen (born 1969), Swedish ice hockey player
- Jonne Aaron Liimatainen (born 1983), Finnish singer, songwriter, musician and producer.
