= Gaspart =

Gaspart is a surname and given name. Notable people with the name include:

- Gaspart Ventura (born 1955), Spanish water polo player
- Joan Gaspart (born 1944), Spanish businessman
