= Tetsunosuke =

- Gender: Male

Origin
- Origin: Japanese
- Meaning: Different meanings depending on the kanji used

Tetsunosuke (written: 鐡之祐, 鐵之助, 鉄之助 or 哲之介) is a masculine Japanese given name. Notable people with the name include:

- Ichimura Tetsunosuke (市村 鉄之助; 1854–?), Japanese page and member of Shinsengumi
- Tetsunosuke Ishii (石井 哲之介; born 1944), Japanese water polo player
- Onishi Tetsunosuke (大西 鐡之祐; 1916–1995), Japanese businessman and politician
- Tomita Tetsunosuke (富田 鐵之助; 1835–1916), Japanese businessman, banker and diplomat
