= Hiroshi Hashimoto =

Hiroshi Hashimoto may refer to:

- Hiroshi Hashimoto (fencer) (橋本 寛, born 1964), Japanese fencer
- Hiroshi Hashimoto (water polo) (橋本 博, born 1950), Japanese water polo player
