= Kenkichi =

- Gender: Male

Origin
- Origin: Japanese
- Meaning: Different meanings depending on the kanji used

Kenkichi (written: 健吉, 謙吉, 鎌吉, 鍵吉 or 憲吉) is a masculine Japanese given name. Notable people with the name include:

- Kenkichi Ando (安藤 謙吉; born 1950), Japanese weightlifter
- Kenkichi Iwasawa (岩澤 健吉; 1917–1998), Japanese mathematician
- Kenkichi Kagami (各務 鎌吉; 1869–1939), Japanese businessman
- Katakura Kenkichi (片倉 健吉), Japanese nobleman
- Kenkichi Maekawa (前川 健吉; born 1953), Japanese sport wrestler
- Kenkichi Nishimi (西見 健吉; born 1967), Japanese sport wrestler
- Kenkichi Oshima (大島 鎌吉; 1908–1985), Japanese triple jumper
- Kenkichi Saito (斎藤 兼吉; 1895 – 1940/1945), Japanese swimmer
- Sakakibara Kenkichi (榊原 鍵吉; 1830–1894), Japanese samurai and martial artist
- Kenkichi Sonogashira (薗頭 健吉; born 1931), Japanese chemist
- Kenkichi Sugimoto (杉本 健吉; 1905–2004), Japanese painter
- Tomimoto Kenkichi (富本 憲吉; 1886–1963), Japanese potter
- Kenkichi Ueda (植田 謙吉; 1875–1962), Japanese general
- Kenkichi Yabashi (矢橋 賢吉, Yabashi Kenkichi; October 24, 1869 - May 24, 1927), Japanese architect
- Yamamoto Kenkichi (山本 健吉; 1907–1988), pen name of Ishibashi Teikichi, Japanese writer and literary critic
- Kenkichi Yoshizawa (芳沢 謙吉; 1874–1965), Japanese diplomat
