= Vicente Martínez =

Vicente Martínez may refer to:

- Vicente Martínez (footballer) (1895–1963), Spanish footballer
- Vicente Martínez (wrestler) (born 1946), Mexican wrestler
- Vicente Martínez-Pujalte (born 1956), Spanish politician
- Vicente Martinez Ybor (1818–1896), Spanish cigar manufacturer in Cuba and Florida
