= Khristo Khristov =

Khristo Khristov (Bulgarian: Христо Христов) may refer to:

- Khristo Khristov (fencer) (born 1951), Bulgarian Olympic fencer
- Khristo Khristov (pole vaulter) (1935–2015), Bulgarian Olympic pole vaulter
- Khristo Khristov (sprinter), winner at the 1998 Balkan Athletics Championships
- Khristo Yankov Khristov, Bulgarian physicist
- Khristo Angelov Khristov, Bulgarian historian

== See also ==
- Christo Christov, Bulgarian film director
- Hristo Hristov, Bulgarian weightlifter
