= Etsuji =

- Gender: Male

Origin
- Origin: Japanese
- Meaning: Different meanings depending on the kanji used

Etsuji (written: 悦二 or 悦司) is a masculine Japanese given name. Notable people with the name include:

- Etsuji Arai (新井 悦二; born 1957), Japanese politician
- Etsuji Fujita (藤田 悦司; born 1961), Japanese water polo player
