= Takashige Matsumoto =

Japanese water polo player

Personal information
- Nationality: Japanese
- Born: 23 September 1908; Hiroshima, Japan
- Died: 8 March 2001 (aged 92); Nishiyodogawa, Japan

Sport
- Sport: Water polo

Takashige Matsumoto (23 September 1908 – 8 March 2001) was a Japanese water polo player. He competed in the men's tournament at the 1932 Summer Olympics.

== See also ==
- Japan men's Olympic water polo team records and statistics
- List of men's Olympic water polo tournament goalkeepers
