= Zakaria Nasution =

Indonesian swimmer (born 1944)

Personal information
- Born: 15 May 1944 (age 82) Medan, Indonesia

Sport
- Sport: Water polo, swimming
Medal record
Water polo
Representing Indonesia
Asian Games
Bronze medal – third place	1970 Bangkok	Men's tournament

Zakaria Nasution (born 15 May 1944) is an Indonesian former swimmer. He competed in two events at the 1960 Summer Olympics.
