= Panagiotis Koutsoupakis =

Greek wrestler

Personal information
- Nationality: Greek
- Born: 24 June 1950 (age 76)

Sport
- Sport: Wrestling

Panagiotis Koutsoupakis (born 24 June 1950) is a Greek wrestler. He competed in the men's freestyle 62 kg at the 1972 Summer Olympics.
