= Sergey Timofeyev =

Soviet wrestler (1950–2021)

Personal information
- Nationality: Soviet
- Born: 19 March 1950 Kazan, Russia
- Died: 5 July 2021 (aged 71)

Sport
- Sport: Wrestling

Sergey Timofeyev (19 March 1950 – 5 July 2021) was a Soviet wrestler. He competed in the men's freestyle 62 kg at the 1976 Summer Olympics.
