= Water polo at the 1970 Asian Games =

- Venue: Visutdrarom Swimming Pool
- Dates: 12–16 December 1970
- Nations: 7

Water polo was only contested for men at the 1970 Asian Games in Bangkok, Thailand.

== Medalists ==
Event	Gold	Silver	Bronze
Men	Japan; Hiroshi Hashimoto; Tatsuo Jihira; Shigeharu Kuwabara; Hirokatsu Kuwayama; Kaoru Matsunaga; Naoto Minegishi; Koji Nakano; Hideo Nishida; Yukiharu Oshita; Toshio Takahashi; Yoshihiro Yasumi	India; Ashok Biswas; Tarun Goswami; Samir Kapadia; Bharat Merchant; Piyush Mitra; Abdul Mutlib; Pattabi Raman; Chandram Rana; Avinash Sarang; Deep Narayan Singh; Umad Singh	Indonesia; Tengku Achmadsjah; Doddy Agussalim; Johanes Bambang Budihardja; Tengku Kamrol; Pandapotan Nasution; Zakaria Nasution; Gunawan Santoso; Rudy Sastranegara; Valentinus Sutandio; Ade Sutargi; Cebjar Hernowo Triono

== Results ==
=== Preliminary round ===
==== Group A ====
Pos	Team	Pld	W	D	L	GF	GA	GD	Pts	Qualification
1	India	3	2	1	0	20	16	+4	5	Semifinals
2	Indonesia	3	2	0	1	20	14	+6	4	Semifinals
3	Singapore	3	1	1	1	22	13	+9	3	
4	Thailand	3	0	0	3	4	23	−19	0	

Source: Results

12 December	Singapore	7–7	India	Visutdrarom Swimming Pool, Bangkok

12 December	Indonesia	8–1	Thailand	Visutdrarom Swimming Pool, Bangkok

13 December	Singapore	4–6	Indonesia	Visutdrarom Swimming Pool, Bangkok

13 December	Thailand	3–4	India	Visutdrarom Swimming Pool, Bangkok

14 December	Indonesia	6–9	India	Visutdrarom Swimming Pool, Bangkok

14 December	Singapore	11–0	Thailand	Visutdrarom Swimming Pool, Bangkok

==== Group B ====
Pos	Team	Pld	W	D	L	GF	GA	GD	Pts	Qualification
1	Japan	2	2	0	0	14	6	+8	4	Semifinals
2	Iran	2	0	1	1	5	8	−3	1 (Note: Head-to-head result: IRN 2–2 MAL. Overall goal difference was used as the tiebreaker.)	Semifinals
3	Malaysia	2	0	1	1	5	10	−5	1	

Source: Results
Notes:

12 December	Japan	6–3	Iran	Visutdrarom Swimming Pool, Bangkok

13 December	Malaysia	2–2	Iran	Visutdrarom Swimming Pool, Bangkok

14 December	Japan	8–3	Malaysia	Visutdrarom Swimming Pool, Bangkok

=== Final round ===
Semifinals
15 December
Japan	14
Indonesia	6
15 December
India	6
Iran	3

Gold medal match
16 December
Japan	4
India	2
Bronze medal match
16 December
Indonesia	5
Iran	2

==== Semifinals ====
15 December	Japan	14–6	Indonesia	Visutdrarom Swimming Pool, Bangkok

15 December	India	6–3	Iran	Visutdrarom Swimming Pool, Bangkok

==== Bronze medal match ====
16 December	Indonesia	5–2	Iran	Visutdrarom Swimming Pool, Bangkok

==== Gold medal match ====
16 December	Japan	4–2	India	Visutdrarom Swimming Pool, Bangkok
