= Benjamin Varela =

Puerto Rican wrestler

Personal information
- Nationality: Puerto Rican
- Born: 14 March 1955 (age 71)

Sport
- Sport: Wrestling

Benjamin Varela (born 14 March 1955) is a Puerto Rican wrestler. He competed in the men's freestyle 62 kg at the 1976 Summer Olympics.
