= Jihei Furusho =

Japanese water polo player

Personal information
- Nationality: Japanese
- Born: 15 December 1914; Kumamoto, Japan

Sport
- Sport: Water polo

Jihei Furusho (古荘次平, Furusho Jihei, born 15 December 1914) was a Japanese water polo player. He competed in the men's tournament at the 1936 Summer Olympics.

== See also ==
- Japan men's Olympic water polo team records and statistics
- List of men's Olympic water polo tournament goalkeepers
