= Rick Zayonc =

Canadian water polo player (born 1959)

Personal information
- Nationality: Canadian
- Born: 18 November 1959 (age 65); New Westminster, British Columbia, Canada

Sport
- Sport: Water polo

Rick Zayonc (born 18 November 1959) is a Canadian water polo player. He competed in the men's tournament at the 1984 Summer Olympics.

== See also ==
- Canada men's Olympic water polo team records and statistics
- List of men's Olympic water polo tournament goalkeepers
