= Guy Leclerc =

Canadian water polo player (born 1955)

Personal information
- Born: 5 October 1955 (age 69); Montreal, Quebec, Canada

Sport
- Sport: Water polo

Guy Leclerc (born 5 October 1955) is a Canadian water polo player. He competed at the 1972 Summer Olympics and the 1976 Summer Olympics.

== See also ==
- Canada men's Olympic water polo team records and statistics
- List of men's Olympic water polo tournament goalkeepers
