= Ivan Krastev (wrestler) =

Bulgarian wrestler (born 1946)

Medal record

Men's freestyle wrestling

Representing Bulgaria

Olympic Games
Bronze medal – third place	1972 Munich	62 kg

Ivan Krastev (Bulgarian: Иван Кръстев; born 29 April 1946) is a Bulgarian former wrestler who competed in the 1972 Summer Olympics.
