= Valentin Nikolov =

Bulgarian fencer

Personal information
- Born: 18 September 1947 (age 78)

Sport
- Sport: Fencing

Valentin Nikolov (Bulgarian: Валентин Николов; born 18 September 1947) is a Bulgarian fencer. He competed in the team sabre event at the 1972 Summer Olympics.
