= Gerhard Weisenberger =

German wrestler (1952–2024)

Gerhard Weisenberger (30 January 1952 – 29 April 2024) was a German wrestler who competed in the 1972 Summer Olympics and in the 1976 Summer Olympics. Weisenberger died on 29 April 2024, at the age of 72.
