= Toshio Takahashi =

Japanese water polo player

Personal information
- Born: April 9, 1949 (age 77)

Sport
- Sport: Water polo
Medal record
Representing Japan
Asian Games
Gold medal – first place	1970 Bangkok	Men's tournament

Toshio Takahashi (高橋 敏夫, Takahashi Toshio; born 9 April 1949) is a Japanese former water polo player who competed in the 1972 Summer Olympics.
