= Ivan Mandov =

Bulgarian sports shooter

Personal information
- Born: 18 February 1951 (age 75) Sopot, Plovdiv Province, Bulgaria

Sport
- Sport: Sports shooting

Ivan Mandov (Bulgarian: Иван Мандов, born 18 February 1951) is a Bulgarian former sports shooter. He competed at the 1972 Summer Olympics and the 1980 Summer Olympics.
