= Stefan Vasilev =

Bulgarian sports shooter

Personal information
- Born: 5 November 1948 (age 77) Sofia, Bulgaria

Sport
- Sport: Sports shooting

Stefan Vasilev (Bulgarian: Стефан Василев; born 5 November 1948) is a Bulgarian former sports shooter. He competed in two events at the 1972 Summer Olympics.
