= Yukiharu Oshita =

Japanese water polo player

Personal information
- Born: August 19, 1949 (age 76)

Sport
- Sport: Water polo
Medal record
Representing Japan
Asian Games
Gold medal – first place	1970 Bangkok	Men's tournament

Yukiharu Oshita (大下 幸治, Ōshita Yukiharu; born 19 August 1949) is a Japanese former water polo player who competed in the 1972 Summer Olympics.

== See also ==
- Japan men's Olympic water polo team records and statistics
- List of men's Olympic water polo tournament goalkeepers
