= Zdzisław Stolarski =

Polish wrestler

Zdzisław Stolarski (born 11 June 1948 in Grzegorzewice) is a Polish former wrestler who competed in the 1972 Summer Olympics.
