= Shigeharu Kuwabara =

Japanese water polo player

Personal information
- Born: December 3, 1940 (age 85)

Sport
- Sport: Water polo
Medal record
Representing Japan
Asian Games
Gold medal – first place	1970 Bangkok	Men's tournament

Shigeharu Kuwabara (桑原 秀治, Kuwabara Shigeharu; born 3 December 1940) is a Japanese former water polo player who competed in the 1968 Summer Olympics.
