= Kiril Slavov =

Bulgarian volleyball player (born 1945)

Personal information
- Nationality: Bulgarian
- Born: 21 July 1945 (age 79); Pernik, Bulgaria

Sport
- Sport: Volleyball

Kiril Slavov (Bulgarian: Кирил Славов, born 21 July 1945) is a Bulgarian volleyball player. He competed at the 1968 Summer Olympics and the 1972 Summer Olympics.
