= Raúl Alanis =

Mexican water polo player (born 1948)

Personal information
- Nationality: Mexican
- Born: 28 April 1948 (age 76)

Sport
- Sport: Water polo

Raúl Alanis (born 28 April 1948) is a Mexican water polo player. He competed in the men's tournament at the 1972 Summer Olympics.
