= Mihály Fodor =

Hungarian wrestler

Personal information
- Nationality: Hungarian
- Born: 16 March 1950 (age 76) Hajdúdorog, Hungary

Sport
- Sport: Wrestling

Mihály Fodor (born 16 March 1950) is a Hungarian wrestler. He competed in the men's freestyle 62 kg at the 1976 Summer Olympics.
