= Eduard Giray =

German wrestler

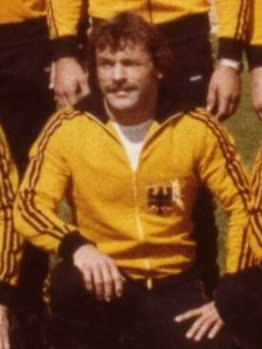
- Eduard Giray in 1978

Personal information
- Nationality: German
- Born: 13 February 1949 Konstanz, Germany
- Died: 24 August 2014 (aged 65) Konstanz, Germany

Sport
- Sport: Wrestling

Eduard Giray (13 February 1949 – 24 August 2014) was a German wrestler. He competed in the men's freestyle 62 kg at the 1976 Summer Olympics.
