= Kenkichi Maekawa =

Japanese freestyle wrestler

Personal information
- Nationality: Japanese
- Born: 16 March 1953 (age 73)

Sport
- Sport: Wrestling

Kenkichi Maekawa (前川 健吉, Maekawa Kenkichi; born 16 March 1953) is a Japanese wrestler. He competed in the men's freestyle 62 kg at the 1976 Summer Olympics.
