= Ian McLauchlain =

Australian water polo player

Personal information
- Nationality: Australian
- Born: 27 June 1948; Sydney, Australia
- Died: 12 January 2008 (aged 59); Sydney, Australia

Sport
- Sport: Water polo

Ian McLauchlain (27 June 1948 – 12 January 2008) was an Australian water polo player. He competed in the men's tournament at the 1972 Summer Olympics.
