= Etsuji Fujita =

Japanese water polo player (born 1961)

Personal information
- Born: July 12, 1961 (age 64)

Sport
- Sport: Water polo
Medal record
Representing Japan
Asian Games
Silver medal – second place	1982 New Delhi	Men's tournament

Etsuji Fujita (藤田 悦司, Fujita Etsuji; born 12 July 1961) is a Japanese former water polo player who competed in the 1984 Summer Olympics.

== See also ==
- Japan men's Olympic water polo team records and statistics
- List of men's Olympic water polo tournament goalkeepers
