= Zdravko Simeonov =

Bulgarian volleyball player (born 1946)

Personal information
- Nationality: Bulgarian
- Born: 17 July 1946 (age 78); Pernik, Bulgaria

Sport
- Sport: Volleyball

Zdravko Simeonov (Bulgarian: Здравко Симеонов, born 17 July 1946) is a Bulgarian volleyball player. He competed at the 1968 Summer Olympics and the 1972 Summer Olympics.
