= Kurt Küpper =

German water polo player

Personal information
- Nationality: German
- Born: 23 October 1948 (age 76); Duisburg, Germany

Sport
- Sport: Water polo

Kurt Küpper (born 23 October 1948) is a German water polo player. He competed in the men's tournament at the 1972 Summer Olympics.
