= Kiyoshi Abe =

Japanese wrestler (born 1947)

Kiyoshi Abe (阿部 巨史, Abe Kiyoshi; born 26 April 1947) is a Japanese former wrestler who competed in the 1972 Summer Olympics.
