= Tatsuo Jihira =

Japanese water polo player

Personal information
- Born: August 6, 1948 (age 77)

Sport
- Sport: Water polo
Medal record
Representing Japan
Asian Games
Gold medal – first place	1970 Bangkok	Men's tournament

Tatsuo Jihira (地平 達郎, Jihira Tatsuo; born 6 August 1948) is a Japanese former water polo player who competed in the 1972 Summer Olympics.
