= Ahmad Djan =

Afghan wrestler

Ahmad Djan (born 10 February 1948, in Panjshir Province ) is an Afghan former wrestler who was a national champion. He represented his country in the 1964 Summer Olympics 1968 Summer Olympics and in the 1972 Summer Olympics.
