= William Van der Pol =

Canadian water polo player (1938–2022)

Personal information
- Nationality: Canadian
- Born: 17 April 1938 's-Gravenzande, Netherlands
- Died: 14 July 2022 (aged 84); Hamilton, Ontario, Canada

Sport
- Sport: Water polo

William Van der Pol (17 April 1938 – 14 July 2022) was a Canadian water polo player. He competed in the men's tournament at the 1972 Summer Olympics.

== See also ==
- Canada men's Olympic water polo team records and statistics
- List of men's Olympic water polo tournament goalkeepers
