= Ivan Ivanov (volleyball) =

Bulgarian volleyball player (born 1950)

Personal information
- Nationality: Bulgarian
- Born: 19 November 1950 (age 74); Harmanli, Bulgaria

Sport
- Sport: Volleyball

Ivan Ivanov (Bulgarian: Иван Иванов, born 19 November 1950) is a Bulgarian volleyball player. He competed in the men's tournament at the 1972 Summer Olympics.
