= Tetsunosuke Ishii =

Japanese water polo player

Personal information
- Born: April 23, 1944 (age 82) Tokyo, Japan

Sport
- Sport: Water polo
Medal record
Representing Japan
Asian Games
Gold medal – first place	1966 Bangkok	Men's tournament

Tetsunosuke Ishii (石井 哲之介, Ishii Tetsunosuke; born 23 April 1944) is a Japanese former water polo player who competed in the 1968 Summer Olympics.

== See also ==
- Japan men's Olympic water polo team records and statistics
- List of men's Olympic water polo tournament goalkeepers
