= Alfredo Sauza =

Mexican water polo player (born 1952)

Alfredo Sauza Martínez
Personal information
- Full name: Alfredo Sauza Martinez
- Born: 12 January 1952 (age 73); Mexico
- Spouse: Veronica Jaramillo Ortiz (m. 1984)

Sport
- Sport: Water polo

Alfredo Sauza (born 12 January 1952) is a Mexican water polo player. He competed in the men's tournament at the 1972 Summer Olympics.
