= Rafael Azpeitia =

Mexican water polo player (born 1952)

Personal information
- Nationality: Mexican
- Born: 17 May 1952 (age 72)

Sport
- Sport: Water polo

Rafael Azpeitia (born 17 May 1952) is a Mexican water polo player. He competed in the men's tournament at the 1972 Summer Olympics.
