= Yoshihiro Yasumi =

Japanese water polo player

Personal information
- Born: June 11, 1949 (age 77)

Sport
- Sport: Water polo
Medal record
Representing Japan
Asian Games
Gold medal – first place	1970 Bangkok	Men's tournament

Yoshihiro Yasumi (保見 吉裕, Yasumi Yoshihiro; born 11 June 1949) is a Japanese former water polo player who competed in the 1972 Summer Olympics.
