= Brunko Iliev =

Bulgarian volleyball player (born 1945)

Personal information
- Nationality: Bulgarian
- Born: 22 November 1945 (age 79); Pleven, Bulgaria

Sport
- Sport: Volleyball

Brunko Iliev (Bulgarian: Брунко Илиев; born 22 November 1945) is a Bulgarian volleyball player. He competed in the men's tournament at the 1972 Summer Olympics.
