= Maria Teresa Romero =

Spanish painter and archer (born 1930)

Maria Teresa Romero (born 22 September 1930) is a Spanish painter and former archer. She was a four time archery champion of Spain and competed in the 1972 Summer Olympic Games.

== Artist career ==
Romero was born in Madrid in 1930. She was taught by Eduardo Peña. Romero began studying Fine Arts at the Real Academia de Bellas Artes de San Fernando in 1956 and earned a Bachelor of Fine Arts degree in 1981. Her paintings La gitana and Mujer de rojo con guitarra won the Bienal Extremeña in 1963 and 1965 respectively. Romero started a painting school in 1979 in Badajoz where she moved to in 1960. 51 of Romero's paintings were featured in an exhibition at the Badajoz Museum of Fine Arts in 2018. This was the first time the museum had an anthological exhibition dedicated to a woman.

== Archery ==
She was a four time champion of Spain in archery. Romero finished thirteenth in the women's individual with a total of 2347 points. She also won the Sports Merit Medal.
