= Mladen Khristov =

Bulgarian water polo player (born 1946)

Personal information
- Nationality: Bulgarian
- Born: 22 March 1946 (age 79); Vrabcha, Bulgaria

Sport
- Sport: Water polo

Mladen Khristov (Bulgarian: Младен Христов; born 22 March 1946) is a Bulgarian water polo player. He competed in the men's tournament at the 1972 Summer Olympics.
