= Joseph Burge =

Guatemalan wrestler

Joseph Burge (born 9 April 1952) is a Guatemalan former wrestler who competed in the 1972 Summer Olympics. He placed 7th in the Freestyle Featherweight mens event.
