= Helmut Strumpf =

German wrestler

Personal information
- Nationality: German
- Born: 20 February 1951 (age 75) Colbitz, East Germany

Sport
- Sport: Wrestling

Helmut Strumpf (born 20 February 1951) is a German former wrestler. He competed in the men's freestyle 62 kg at the 1976 Summer Olympics.
