= Vasil Tomov =

Bulgarian water polo player (born 1948)

Personal information
- Nationality: Bulgarian
- Born: 19 April 1948 (age 77); Sofia, Bulgaria

Sport
- Sport: Water polo

Vasil Tomov (Bulgarian: Васил Томов; born 19 April 1948) is a Bulgarian water polo player. He competed in the men's tournament at the 1972 Summer Olympics.
