= Naoto Minegishi =

Japanese water polo player

Personal information
- Born: April 9, 1950 (age 76)

Sport
- Sport: Water polo
Medal record
Representing Japan
Asian Games
Gold medal – first place	1970 Bangkok	Men's tournament

Naoto Minegishi (峰岸 直人, Minegishi Naoto; born 9 April 1950) is a former Japanese water polo player who competed in the 1972 Summer Olympics.
