= Aleksandar Shintser =

Bulgarian water polo player (born 1946)

Personal information
- Nationality: Bulgarian
- Born: 1 August 1946 (age 80) Ruse, Bulgaria

Sport
- Sport: Water polo

Aleksandar Shintser (Bulgarian: Александър Шпицер, romanized: Aleksandar Shpitser; born 1 August 1946) is a former Bulgarian water polo player. He competed in the men's tournament at the 1972 Summer Olympics.
