= László Szabó (wrestler) =

Hungarian wrestler

László Szabó (7 August 1946 – 11 March 2010) was a Hungarian wrestler who competed in the 1972 Summer Olympics. He was born in Kecskemét.
