= Khristo Khristov (fencer) =

Bulgarian fencer (born 1951)

Personal information
- Born: 17 April 1951 (age 75)

Sport
- Sport: Fencing

Khristo Khristov (Bulgarian: Христо Христов; born 17 April 1951) is a Bulgarian fencer. He competed in the team sabre events at the 1972 and 1976 Summer Olympics. He is also a coach and referee.
