= Hiroshi Hashimoto (water polo) =

Japanese water polo player (born 1950)

Personal information
- Born: October 30, 1950 (age 75)

Sport
- Sport: Water polo
Medal record
Representing Japan
Asian Games
Gold medal – first place	1970 Bangkok	Men's tournament

Hiroshi Hashimoto (橋本 博, Hashimoto Hiroshi; born 30 October 1950) is a Japanese former water polo player who competed in the 1972 Summer Olympics.
