= Ivan Kovachev =

Bulgarian water polo player (born 1943)

Personal information
- Nationality: Bulgarian
- Born: 18 May 1943 (age 82); Sofia, Bulgaria

Sport
- Sport: Water polo

Ivan Kovachev (Bulgarian: Иван Ковачев; born 18 May 1943) is a Bulgarian water polo player. He competed in the men's tournament at the 1972 Summer Olympics.
