= Vicente Martínez (wrestler) =

Mexican wrestler

Vicente Martínez (born 2 November 1946) is a Mexican former wrestler who competed in the 1972 Summer Olympics.
