= Gabriel Soler =

Spanish water polo player (born 1953)

Personal information
- Nationality: Spanish
- Born: 10 March 1953 (age 72); Barcelona, Spain

Sport
- Sport: Water polo

Gabriel Soler (born 10 March 1953) is a Spanish water polo player. He competed in the men's tournament at the 1972 Summer Olympics.
