= Alfonso Cánovas =

Spanish water polo player (born 1952)

Personal information
- Nationality: Spanish
- Born: 23 July 1952 (age 72); Barcelona, Spain

Sport
- Sport: Water polo

Alfonso Cánovas (born 23 July 1952) is a Spanish water polo player. He competed in the men's tournament at the 1972 Summer Olympics.
