= Lyubomir Runtov =

Bulgarian water polo player (born 1942)

Personal information
- Nationality: Bulgarian
- Born: 7 May 1942 (age 83); Sofia, Bulgaria

Sport
- Sport: Water polo

Lyubomir Runtov (Bulgarian: Любомир Рунтов; born 7 May 1942) is a Bulgarian water polo player. He competed in the men's tournament at the 1972 Summer Olympics.
