= Gaspar Ventura =

Spanish water polo player (born 1955)

Personal information
- Full name: Gaspar Ventura Meseguer
- Nationality: Spanish
- Born: 5 February 1955 (age 71) Barcelona, Spain

Sport
- Sport: Water polo

Gaspar Ventura Meseguer (born 5 February 1955) is a Spanish water polo player. He competed at the 1972 Summer Olympics and the 1980 Summer Olympics.
