= Jorma Liimatainen =

Finnish wrestler (born 1947)

Jorma Tapio Liimatainen (born 31 October 1947 in Suolahti) is a Finnish former wrestler who competed in the 1972 Summer Olympics.
