= Théodule Toulotte =

French wrestler

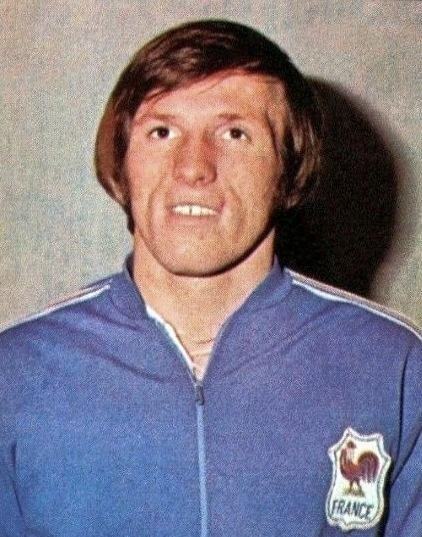
Théodule Toulotte (1976), 'Montreal 76', Panini figurine n ° 238.

Théodule Toulotte (born 20 December 1950) is a French former wrestler who competed in the 1972 Summer Olympics and in the 1976 Summer Olympics.
