= Vehbi Akdağ =

Turkish wrestler (1949–2020)

Personal information
- Nationality: Turkey
- Born: 1 January 1949 Tokat, Turkey
- Died: 23 June 2020 (aged 71) Tokat, Turkey

Sport
- Sport: Wrestling
Medal record
Representing Turkey
Men's Freestyle wrestling
Olympic Games
Silver medal – second place	1972 Munich	62 kg
World Championships
Bronze medal – third place	1974 Istanbul	62 kg
European Championships
Bronze medal – third place	1973 Lausanne	62 kg

Vehbi Akdağ (1 January 1949 – 23 June 2020) was a Turkish wrestler and Olympic silver medalist in Freestyle wrestling.

Akdağ competed at the 1972 Summer Olympics in Munich where he received a silver medal in featherweight class in Freestyle wrestling.
