= Gene Davis (wrestler) =

American wrestler (born 1945)

Personal information
- Full name: Eugene Lee Davis
- Born: November 17, 1945 (age 80) Missoula, Montana, U.S.

Sport
- Country: United States
- Sport: Wrestling
- Events: Freestyle and Folkstyle
- College team: Oklahoma State
- Team: USA
- Coached by: Myron Roderick
Medal record
Men's freestyle wrestling
Representing the United States
Olympic Games
Bronze medal – third place	1976 Montreal	62 kg
Collegiate Wrestling
Representing the Oklahoma State Cowboys
NCAA Division I Championships
Gold medal – first place	1966 Ames	137 lb
Bronze medal – third place	1967 Kent	137 lb
Big 8 Championships
Gold medal – first place	1966 Manhattan	137 lb
Gold medal – first place	1967 Norman	137 lb
Silver medal – second place	1965 Norman	137 lb

Eugene Lee "Gene" Davis (born November 17, 1945) is an American former wrestler. He was born and raised in Missoula, Montana. He was Olympic bronze medalist in freestyle wrestling in 1976. In 1985, Davis was inducted into the National Wrestling Hall of Fame as a Distinguished Member.
